= FIS Nordic World Ski Championships 2015 – Individual large hill =

Sporting event

Individual large hill at the FIS Nordic World Ski Championships 2015
- Date: 26 February 2015
- Competitors: 50 from 17 nations
- Winning points: 268.7

Medalists
gold medal	Severin Freund	Germany
silver medal	Gregor Schlierenzauer	Austria
bronze medal	Rune Velta	Norway

The Individual large hill event of the FIS Nordic World Ski Championships 2015 was held on 26 February 2015. A qualification was held on 25 February 2015.

== Results ==
=== Qualification ===
The qualification was started at 18:30.

Rank	Bib	Name	Country	Distance (m)	Points	Notes
1	55	Richard Freitag	Germany	129.0	123.5	Q
2	53	Markus Eisenbichler	Germany	128.5	123.4	Q
3	49	Taku Takeuchi	Japan	127.5	118.5	Q
4	41	Manuel Poppinger	Austria	126.0	117.4	Q
4	33	Klemens Murańka	Poland	125.5	117.4	Q
6	52	Daiki Ito	Japan	130.0	113.4	Q
7	40	Jarkko Määttä	Finland	125.0	113.1	Q
8	51	Piotr Żyła	Poland	122.0	112.7	Q
9	46	Nejc Dežman	Slovenia	124.0	112.4	Q
10	48	Johann André Forfang	Norway	123.0	112.2	Q
11	56	Simon Ammann	Switzerland	130.5	111.9	Q
12	36	Junshiro Kobayashi	Japan	123.0	110.0	Q
13	42	Gregor Deschwanden	Switzerland	121.5	109.9	Q
14	44	Dimitry Vassilev	Russia	122.5	108.6	Q
15	27	Janne Ahonen	Finland	119.0	108.3	Q
16	54	Jernej Damjan	Slovenia	122.0	107.5	Q
17	28	Vladimir Zografski	Bulgaria	120.0	106.5	Q
18	35	Davide Bresadola	Italy	121.5	106.3	Q
19	39	Jan Matura	Czech Republic	119.5	104.0	Q
20	47	Matjaž Pungertar	Slovenia	118.0	103.7	Q
21	34	Dawid Kubacki	Poland	117.0	102.7	Q
22	37	Aleksander Zniszczoł	Poland	116.5	102.4	Q
23	29	Ronan Lamy Chappuis	France	117.5	101.2	Q
24	38	Andreas Wellinger	Germany	115.5	100.8	Q
25	50	Anders Bardal	Norway	122.0	99.9	Q
26	31	Mikhail Maksimochkin	Russia	114.0	99.3	Q
27	22	Denis Kornilov	Russia	115.0	98.0	Q
28	20	Choi Seou	South Korea	119.5	97.8	Q
29	24	Sebastian Colloredo	Italy	118.5	96.7	Q
30	26	Harri Olli	Finland	110.5	95.7	Q
31	30	Killian Peier	Switzerland	113.0	93.5	Q
32	43	Vincent Descombes Sevoie	France	114.5	93.0	Q
33	1	Michael Glasder	United States	114.0	92.6	Q
34	4	Luca Egloff	Switzerland	111.5	90.7	Q
35	32	Jakub Janda	Czech Republic	111.5	90.6	Q
36	19	Evgenii Klimov	Russia	114.5	88.3	Q
36	7	Federico Cecon	Italy	110.0	88.3	Q
38	45	Lauri Asikainen	Finland	109.5	87.2	Q
39	9	Martti Nõmme	Estonia	107.0	77.7	Q
40	23	Sabirzhan Muminov	Kazakhstan	107.5	74.9	Q
41	21	William Rhoads	United States	106.0	74.7	
42	15	Viktor Polášek	Czech Republic	106.5	74.1	
42	14	Siim-Tanel Sammelselg	Estonia	105.5	74.1	
44	3	Daniele Varesco	Italy	107.0	73.7	
45	6	Kang Chil-ku	South Korea	106.0	73.0	
46	25	Kim Hyun-ki	South Korea	100.5	70.2	
46	2	Vitaliy Kalinichenko	Ukraine	104.5	70.2	
48	18	Andrii Klymchuk	Ukraine	102.5	69.0	
49	5	Christian Inngjerdingen	Sweden	100.0	66.9	
50	8	Marat Zhaparov	Kazakhstan	100.0	66.5	
51	13	Stepan Pasichnyk	Ukraine	102.5	63.8	
51	12	Nico Polychronidis	Greece	104.5	63.8	
51	11	Carl Nordin	Sweden	100.5	63.8	
54	10	Radik Zhaparov	Kazakhstan	101.0	62.5	
55	17	Jonas Sandell	Sweden	96.0	54.4	
56	16	Choi Heung-chul	South Korea	84.5	25.2	
Prequalified
	57	Rune Velta	Norway	135.0		Q
	65	Stefan Kraft	Austria	132.0		Q
	61	Michael Hayböck	Austria	128.0		Q
	63	Anders Fannemel	Norway	122.0		Q
	62	Roman Koudelka	Czech Republic	119.0		Q
	66	Peter Prevc	Slovenia	119.0		Q
	58	Gregor Schlierenzauer	Austria	DNS		Q
	59	Kamil Stoch	Poland	DNS		Q
	60	Noriaki Kasai	Japan	DNS		Q
	64	Severin Freund	Germany	DNS		Q

=== Final ===
The first round was started at 17:00 and the second round at 18:09.

Rank	Bib	Name	Country	Round 1 Distance (m)	Round 1 Points	Round 1 Rank	Final Round Distance (m)	Final Round Points	Final Round Rank	Total Points
1st place, gold medalist(s)	48	Severin Freund	Germany	134.0	131.0	1	135.5	137.7	1	268.7
2nd place, silver medalist(s)	42	Gregor Schlierenzauer	Austria	128.0	122.9	3	130.0	123.5	3	246.4
3rd place, bronze medalist(s)	41	Rune Velta	Norway	126.5	118.1	8	128.5	124.8	2	242.9
4	50	Peter Prevc	Slovenia	134.0	121.7	4	125.5	120.1	6	241.8
5	49	Stefan Kraft	Austria	125.0	120.6	5	125.5	117.1	8	237.7
6	34	Anders Bardal	Norway	131.5	126.2	2	122.0	110.3	13	236.5
7	47	Anders Fannemel	Norway	129.0	119.7	6	127.0	114.2	10	233.9
8	46	Roman Koudelka	Czech Republic	123.5	113.4	11	124.5	120.2	5	233.6
9	35	Piotr Żyła	Poland	123.0	113.6	10	121.5	116.2	9	229.8
10	37	Markus Eisenbichler	Germany	122.5	110.1	15	127.5	117.8	7	227.9
11	44	Noriaki Kasai	Japan	129.5	119.2	7	119.5	108.1	17	227.3
12	43	Kamil Stoch	Poland	125.0	112.2	12	124.5	112.8	11	225.0
13	20	Junshiro Kobayashi	Japan	119.0	101.2	21	130.0	121.5	4	222.7
14	45	Michael Hayböck	Austria	125.0	114.1	9	119.5	106.9	19	221.0
15	39	Richard Freitag	Germany	124.0	111.7	13	120.5	107.3	18	219.0
16	23	Jan Matura	Czech Republic	122.5	107.1	19	120.0	108.2	16	215.3
17	26	Gregor Deschwanden	Switzerland	122.5	107.4	18	121.5	106.7	20	214.1
18	32	Johann André Forfang	Norway	118.0	97.7	23	127.0	112.0	12	209.7
19	11	Janne Ahonen	Finland	118.5	100.1	22	122.5	106.4	21	206.5
20	17	Klemens Murańka	Poland	123.0	109.8	16	113.5	95.8	25	205.6
21	28	Dimitry Vassilev	Russia	115.5	94.8	27	125.0	109.7	14	204.5
22	24	Jarkko Määttä	Finland	114.5	93.2	30	125.5	108.4	15	201.6
23	40	Simon Ammann	Switzerland	125.0	111.3	14	114.0	88.2	28	199.5
24	33	Taku Takeuchi	Japan	121.0	107.7	17	109.5	90.0	27	197.7
25	38	Jernej Damjan	Slovenia	116.5	97.0	25	121.0	100.5	23	197.5
26	30	Nejc Dežman	Slovenia	116.5	94.6	28	120.0	102.6	22	197.2
27	7	Denis Kornilov	Russia	116.0	97.1	24	117.5	96.6	24	193.7
28	36	Daiki Ito	Japan	119.0	106.0	20	111.0	86.1	29	192.1
29	18	Dawid Kubacki	Poland	115.5	95.1	26	115.5	93.6	26	188.7
30	14	Killian Peier	Switzerland	117.0	93.3	29	108.5	79.1	30	172.4
31	15	Mikhail Maksimochkin	Russia	115.0	93.1	31				
32	25	Manuel Poppinger	Austria	115.5	91.1	32				
33	16	Jakub Janda	Czech Republic	112.0	90.8	33				
34	27	Vincent Descombes Sevoie	France	113.0	88.0	34				
35	5	Evgenii Klimov	Russia	112.5	86.7	35				
36	19	Davide Bresadola	Italy	112.5	86.1	36				
37	31	Matjaž Pungertar	Slovenia	110.5	85.3	37				
38	6	Choi Seou	South Korea	110.0	83.2	38				
39	29	Lauri Asikainen	Finland	109.5	82.4	39				
40	21	Aleksander Zniszczoł	Poland	110.0	80.6	40				
41	13	Ronan Lamy Chappuis	France	108.0	79.3	41				
42	9	Sebastian Colloredo	Italy	108.5	77.2	42				
43	10	Harri Olli	Finland	107.0	77.0	43				
44	2	Luca Egloff	Switzerland	105.0	75.3	44				
45	8	Sabirzhan Muminov	Kazakhstan	105.0	73.6	45				
46	1	Michael Glasder	United States	102.5	68.3	46				
47	12	Vladimir Zografski	Bulgaria	103.5	66.2	47				
48	4	Martti Nõmme	Estonia	96.0	57.6	48				
49	3	Federico Cecon	Italy	96.5	57.5	49				
	22	Andreas Wellinger	Germany	DNS						
