= FIS Nordic World Ski Championships 2015 – Men's individual normal hill =

Men's individual normal hill at the FIS Nordic World Ski Championships 2015
- Date: 21 February 2015
- Competitors: 50 from 15 nations
- Winning points: 252.7

Medalists
gold medal	Rune Velta	Norway
silver medal	Severin Freund	Germany
bronze medal	Stefan Kraft	Austria

The Men's individual normal hill event of the FIS Nordic World Ski Championships 2015 was held on 21 February 2015. A qualifying will be held on 20 February.

== Results ==
=== Qualifying ===
The qualifying was started at 19:00.

Rank	Bib	Name	Country	Distance (m)	Points	Notes
1	59	Simon Ammann	Switzerland	93.5	119.0	Q
2	50	Taku Takeuchi	Japan	92.0	118.0	Q
3	51	Anders Bardal	Norway	92.0	117.2	Q
4	41	Andreas Wellinger	Germany	91.0	114.5	Q
5	44	Gregor Deschwanden	Switzerland	92.0	114.4	Q
6	56	Daiki Ito	Japan	89.5	114.0	Q
7	53	Piotr Żyła	Poland	90.5	113.4	Q
8	48	Nejc Dežman	Slovenia	89.5	112.3	Q
9	58	Richard Freitag	Germany	87.5	110.5	Q
10	55	Anders Jacobsen	Norway	88.5	110.4	Q
11	38	Junshiro Kobayashi	Japan	89.0	109.8	Q
12	37	Jan Ziobro	Poland	88.5	109.7	Q
13	57	Jernej Damjan	Slovenia	88.0	109.5	Q
14	54	Marinus Kraus	Germany	88.0	107.5	Q
15	29	Ronan Lamy Chappuis	France	88.5	107.3	Q
15	39	Thomas Diethart	Austria	88.5	107.3	Q
17	34	Klemens Murańka	Poland	89.0	107.0	Q
18	33	Jakub Janda	Czech Republic	87.5	106.7	Q
19	36	Davide Bresadola	Italy	88.0	106.5	Q
20	25	Janne Ahonen	Finland	86.5	105.4	Q
21	52	Jurij Tepeš	Slovenia	86.0	104.9	Q
22	46	Dimitry Vassiliev	Russia	89.0	104.0	Q
23	26	Vladimir Zografski	Bulgaria	87.0	103.8	Q
24	32	Ilmir Hazetdinov	Russia	86.5	103.7	Q
25	43	Jarkko Määttä	Finland	86.5	103.6	Q
26	47	Lauri Asikainen	Finland	85.5	102.5	Q
27	20	Choi Seou	South Korea	86.0	102.2	Q
28	45	Vincent Descombes Sevoie	France	84.5	100.0	Q
29	27	Lukáš Hlava	Czech Republic	84.5	99.7	Q
30	21	William Rhoads	United States	84.5	99.3	Q
31	30	Killian Peier	Switzerland	85.0	98.4	Q
32	42	Jan Matura	Czech Republic	82.5	96.3	Q
33	23	Sebastian Colloredo	Italy	83.5	95.0	Q
34	3	Luca Egloff	Switzerland	81.5	93.4	Q
35	49	Johann André Forfang	Norway	82.0	93.3	Q
36	40	Vladislav Boyarintsev	Russia	84.0	92.7	Q
37	35	Ville Larinto	Finland	81.5	92.2	Q
38	2	Daniele Varesco	Italy	81.0	91.4	Q
39	31	Mikhail Maksimochkin	Russia	81.0	91.0	Q
40	7	Federico Cecon	Italy	80.5	89.2	Q
41	28	Nicholas Alexander	United States	80.0	89.1	
42	9	Martti Nomme	Estonia	79.5	87.2	
43	12	Nico Polychronidis	Greece	79.0	85.7	
44	24	Kim Hyun-ki	South Korea	78,5	85.4	
45	6	Kang Chil-ku	South Korea	77.0	82.9	
46	22	Sabirzhan Muminov	Kazakhstan	78.5	81.5	
47	11	Carl Nordin	Sweden	77.0	81.4	
48	19	Andrii Klymchuk	Ukraine	75.5	80.2	
49	8	Marat Zhaparov	Kazakhstan	76.5	79.7	
50	1	Vitaliy Kalinichenko	Ukraine	76.0	78.9	
50	15	Siim-Tanel Sammelselg	Estonia	75.0	78.,9	
52	16	Choi Heung-chul	South Korea	73.0	72.2	
53	18	Jonas Sandell	Sweden	72.0	72.1	
54	10	Radik Zhaparov	Kazakhstan	72.0	71.8	
55	4	Christian Inngjerdingen	Sweden	71.0	71.0	
56	14	Sergey Tkachenko	Kazakhstan	69.0	58.0	
57	5	Kristaps Nežborts	Latvia	57.0	40.1	
58	13	Stepan Pasichnyk	Ukraine	61.0	40.0	
59	17	Peter Kelemen	Hungary	56.0	34.7	
Prequalified
	60	Rune Velta	Norway	91.5		Q
	61	Gregor Schlierenzauer	Austria	86.5		Q
	62	Kamil Stoch	Poland	86.5		Q
	63	Noriaki Kasai	Japan	93.0		Q
	64	Michael Hayböck	Austria	86.5		Q
	65	Roman Koudelka	Czech Republic	92.0		Q
	66	Anders Fannemel	Norway	87.5		Q
	67	Severin Freund	Germany	93.0		Q
	68	Stefan Kraft	Austria	DNS		Q
	69	Peter Prevc	Slovenia	89.5		Q

=== Final ===
The first round was started at 16:30 and the second round at 17:40.

Rank	Bib	Name	Country	Round 1 Distance (m)	Round 1 Points	Round 1 Rank	Final Round Distance (m)	Final Round Points	Final Round Rank	Total Points
1st place, gold medalist(s)	41	Rune Velta	Norway	95.5	125.1	1	95.5	127.6	2	252.7
2nd place, silver medalist(s)	48	Severin Freund	Germany	95.5	122.6	3	96.0	129.7	1	252.3
3rd place, bronze medalist(s)	49	Stefan Kraft	Austria	95.0	123.4	2	95.0	124.9	3	248.3
4	46	Roman Koudelka	Czech Republic	93.5	119.5	4	93.5	123.2	5	242.7
5	31	Taku Takeuchi	Japan	93.0	118.2	5	93.0	123.4	4	241.6
6	32	Anders Bardal	Norway	93.0	116.7	8	91.5	121.5	6	238.5
7	39	Richard Freitag	Germany	91.5	116.9	7	90.5	116.8	8	233.7
8	18	Jan Ziobro	Poland	91.5	112.0	12	91.5	116.6	9	228.6
9	47	Anders Fannemel	Norway	92.0	114.3	9	89.0	113.3	13	227.6
10	35	Marinus Kraus	Germany	90.5	111.9	13	91.0	115.2	11	227.1
11	22	Andreas Wellinger	Germany	91.0	111.5	14	90.5	114.5	12	226.0
12	37	Daiki Ito	Japan	91.0	112.3	11	89.0	113.0	14	225.3
13	50	Peter Prevc	Slovenia	92.0	118.1	6	87.5	108.7	25	224.8
14	25	Gregor Deschwanden	Switzerland	88.5	105.2	24	94.0	117.8	7	223.0
15	7	Janne Ahonen	Finland	90.5	110.7	15	89.0	110.9	16	221.6
16	40	Simon Ammann	Switzerland	88.0	105.9	21	94.5	115.6	10	221.5
17	43	Kamil Stoch	Poland	90.0	109.9	16	89.0	110.3	17	220.2
17	15	Klemens Murańka	Poland	92.0	112.8	10	88.0	107.4	24	220.2
19	36	Anders Jacobsen	Norway	90.0	109.3	18	89.5	110.0	19	219.3
20	29	Nejc Dežman	Slovenia	89.5	109.4	17	88.0	107.7	23	217.1
21	45	Michael Hayböck	Austria	87.0	104.4	26	90.5	112.1	15	216.5
22	42	Gregor Schlierenzauer	Austria	89.0	107.8	20	88.5	108.1	22	215.9
23	38	Jernej Damjan	Slovenia	87.5	105.1	25	90.5	110.3	17	215.4
24	12	Mikhail Maksimochkin	Russia	90.0	105.8	22	89.0	108.7	20	214.5
25	19	Junshiro Kobayashi	Japan	89.5	105.7	23	89.0	108.6	21	214.3
26	10	Ronan Lamy Chappuis	France	89.5	108.0	19	87.5	105.2	28	213.2
27	20	Thomas Diethart	Austria	88.0	103.9	27	89.5	105.6	26	209.5
28	14	Jakub Janda	Czech Republic	87.5	103.1	29	88.0	105.3	27	208.4
29	26	Vincent Descombes Sevoie	France	87.0	103.4	28	87.5	103.2	29	206.6
30	8	Vladimir Zografski	Bulgaria	87.5	102.1	30	84.0	97.2	30	199.3
31	11	Killian Peier	Switzerland	87.5	101.5	31				101.5
32	9	Lukáš Hlava	Czech Republic	87.0	101.2	32				101.2
33	34	Piotr Żyła	Poland	89.5	101.1	33				101.1
34	24	Jarkko Määttä	Finland	86.0	101.0	34				101.0
35	44	Noriaki Kasai	Japan	86.5	100.9	35				100.9
36	4	Choi Seou	South Korea	87.0	99.4	36				99.4
37	17	Davide Bresadola	Italy	85.0	99.1	37				99.1
38	23	Jan Matura	Czech Republic	86.5	98.7	38				98.7
39	28	Lauri Asikainen	Finland	87.0	98.4	39				98.4
40	27	Dimitry Vassiliev	Russia	84.5	94.4	40				94.4
41	33	Jurij Tepeš	Slovenia	83.5	93.9	41				93.9
42	13	Ilmir Hazetdinov	Russia	83.5	92.1	42				92.1
42	2	Luca Egloff	Switzerland	83.5	92.1	43				92.1
44	6	Sebastian Colloredo	Italy	82.0	91.2	44				91.2
45	21	Vladislav Boyarintsev	Russia	81.0	87.8	45				87.8
46	1	Daniele Varesco	Italy	81.5	87.4	46				87.4
47	16	Ville Larinto	Finland	80.0	84.8	47				84.8
48	3	Federico Cecon	Italy	79.5	84.1	48				84.1
	5	William Rhoads	United States	DSQ						
	30	Johann André Forfang	Norway	DSQ						
