= Ski jumping at the FIS Nordic World Ski Championships 2015 =

Ski jumping competitions at the FIS Nordic World Ski Championships took place on 19 – 29 February 2015 in Falun, Sweden.

All competitions were held at the Lugnet ski jumping hills. It was the third time, that five competitions were held during the Championships (together with 2011 and 2013). There were three individual competitions (one for men and one for women at the normal hill HS100 and one for men at the large hill HS134) and two team competitions (men at the large hill and mixed at the normal hill).

Champion's titles were defended by: Anders Bardal (the individual men competition, normal hill), Kamil Stoch (the individual men competition, large hill), Sarah Hendrickson (the individual women competition, normal hill), team Austria (the team men competition, large hill) and team Japan (the mixed team competition, normal hill).

== The ski jumping hills ==
Three competitions were held at the normal hill and the other two – at the large hill.

Ski jumping hill	Place	Construction point	HS	Record			Gate factor	Wind factor
Lugnet	Falun	K-90	HS 100	97,0 m	Severin Freund	22 February 2015	6,00 pkt/m	6,40/7,74 pkt/m/s
Lugnet	Falun	K-90	HS 100	98,5 m	Sarah Hendrickson	22 February 2015	6,00 pkt/m	6,40/7,74 pkt/m/s
Lugnet	Falun	K-120	HS 134	135,5 m	Severin Freund	26 February 2015	7,24 pkt/m	8,82/10,67 pkt/m/s

== Jury ==
The FIS Chiefs of the Competitions were: Chika Yoshida and Walter Hofer. Yoshida's assistant was Borek Sedlák and Hofer's – Miran Tepeš.

== Medals ==
=== Men ===
==== Individual competition, HS100 (21.02.2015) ====
Rank	Jumper	Jump 1	Jump 2	Total
1.	Rune Velta	95,5 m 125,1 pkt	95,5 m 127,6 pkt	252,7 pkt
2.	Severin Freund	95,5 m 122,6 pkt	96,0 m 129,7 pkt	252,3 pkt
3.	Stefan Kraft	95,0 m 123,4 pkt	95,0 m 124,9 pkt	248,3 pkt

==== Individual competition, HS134 (26.02.2015) ====
Rank	Jumper	Jump 1	Jump 2	Total
1.	Severin Freund	134,0 m 131,0 pkt	135,5 m 137,7 pkt	268,7 pkt
2.	Gregor Schlierenzauer	128,0 m 122,9 pkt	130,0 m 123,5 pkt	246,4 pkt
3.	Rune Velta	126,5 m 118,1 pkt	128,5 m 124,8 pkt	242,9 pkt

==== Team competition, HS134 (28.02.2015) ====
Rank	Team	Jumper	Jump 1	Jump 2	Points	Total
1.	Norway	Anders Bardal	125,0 m 110,7 pkt	125,5 m 117,8 pkt	228,5 pkt	872,6 pkt
1.	Norway	Anders Jacobsen	125,0 m 105,7 pkt	123,0 m 101,1 pkt	206,8 pkt	872,6 pkt
1.	Norway	Anders Fannemel	126,5 m 105,9 pkt	127,5 m 115,9 pkt	221,8 pkt	872,6 pkt
1.	Norway	Rune Velta	124,0 m 107,6 pkt	121,0 m 107,9 pkt	215,5 pkt	872,6 pkt
2.	Austria	Stefan Kraft	131,5 m 120,2 pkt	126,5 m 114,2 pkt	234,4 pkt	853,2 pkt
2.	Austria	Michael Hayboeck	124,5 m 106,8 pkt	122,0 m 97,0 pkt	203,8 pkt	853,2 pkt
2.	Austria	Manuel Poppinger	119,5 m 91,0 pkt	129,5 m 112,0 pkt	203,0 pkt	853,2 pkt
2.	Austria	Gregor Schlierenzauer	119,0 m 92,5 pkt	129,0 m 119,5 pkt	212,0 pkt	853,2 pkt
3.	Poland	Piotr Żyła	123,0 m 108,0 pkt	123,0 m 108,2 pkt	216,2 pkt	848,1 pkt
3.	Poland	Klemens Murańka	120,5 m 99,2 pkt	128,0 m 107,4 pkt	212,1 pkt	848,1 pkt
3.	Poland	Jan Ziobro	116,0 87,3 pkt	125,5 m 105,5 pkt	192,8 pkt	848,1 pkt
3.	Poland	Kamil Stoch	129,5 m 113,4 pkt	126,0 m 113,6 pkt	227,0 pkt	848,1 pkt

=== Women ===
==== Individual competition, HS100 (20.02.2015) ====
Rank	Jumper	Jump 1	Jump 2	Total
1.	Carina Vogt	91,5 m 119,2 pkt	92,0 m 117,7 pkt	236,9 pkt
2.	Yūki Itō	89,0 m 113,9 pkt	93,0 m 121,2 pkt	235,1 pkt
3.	Daniela Iraschko-Stolz	92,5 m 122,9 pkt	89,0 m 110,9 pkt	233,8 pkt

=== Mixed competition ===
==== Mixed team competition, HS100 (22.02.2015) ====
Rank	Team	Jumper	Jump 1	Jump 2	Points	Total
1.	Germany	Carina Vogt	93,5 m 108,7 pkt	92,0 m 112,7 pkt	221,4 pkt	917,9 pkt
1.	Germany	Richard Freitag	93,5 m 115,0 pkt	92,0 m 115,7 pkt	230,7 pkt	917,9 pkt
1.	Germany	Katharina Althaus	91,0 m 107,3 pkt	92,5 m 108,7 pkt	216,0 pkt	917,9 pkt
1.	Germany	Severin Freund	97,0 m 122,2 pkt	96,0 m 127,6 pkt	249,8 pkt	917,9 pkt
2.	Norway	Line Jahr	93,5 m 108,1 pkt	90,5 m 107,9 pkt	216,0 pkt	915,6 pkt
2.	Norway	Anders Bardal	92,5 m 111,8 pkt	89,5 m 110,4 pkt	222,4 pkt	915,6 pkt
2.	Norway	Maren Lundby	95,0 m 116,4 pkt	91,5 m 115,5 pkt	231,9 pkt	915,6 pkt
2.	Norway	Rune Velta	95,0 m 119,4 pkt	95,5 m 125,9 pkt	245,3 pkt	915,6 pkt
3.	Japan	Sara Takanashi	95,5 m 112,1 pkt	93,0 m 114,2 pkt	226,3 pkt	888,3 pkt
3.	Japan	Noriaki Kasai	90,0 m 105,8 pkt	88,5 m 107,4 pkt	213,2 pkt	888,3 pkt
3.	Japan	Yūki Itō	88,5m 101,7 pkt	90,5 m 110,1 pkt	211,8 pkt	888,3 pkt
3.	Japan	Taku Takeuchi	95,0 m 118,2 pkt	93,5 m 118,8 pkt	237,0 pkt	888,3 pkt

=== Medal count ===
Rank	Country	Gold	Silver	Bronze	Total
1.	Germany	3	1	–	4
2.	Norway	2	1	1	4
3.	Austria	–	2	2	4
4.	Japan	–	1	1	2
5.	Poland	–	–	1	1
Total		5	5	5	15

== Wyniki ==
=== Women ===
==== Individual competition, HS100 (20.02.2015) ====
Rank	Jumper	Country	Jump 1	Jump 2	Points
1.	Carina Vogt	Germany	91,5	92,0	236,9
2.	Yuki Ito	Japan	89,0	93,0	235,1
3.	Daniela Iraschko-Stolz	Austria	92,5	89,0	233,8
4.	Sara Takanashi	Japan	90,0	93,0	228,3
5,	Taylor Henrich	Canada	90,5	91,0	227,9
6.	Sarah Hendrickson	USA	87,0	91,0	226,4
7.	Jacqueline Seifriedsberger	Austria	98,0	90,5	225,6
8.	Eva Pinkelnig	Austria	89,0	89,5	223,8
9.	Jessica Jerome	USA	86,5	90,5	219,4
10.	Spela Rogelj	Slovenia	87,0	88,5	217,9
11.	Irina Avvakumova	Russia	87,5	88,5	215,8
12.	Nita Englund	USA	86,5	88,5	214,5
13.	Maja Vtic	Slovenia	87,5	88,5	213,7
14.	Juliane Seyfarth	Germany	85,0	90,0	212,5
15.	Maren Lundby	Norway	86,0	88,0	211,6
16.	Chiara Hoelzl	Austroa	88,5	87,5	211,3
17.	Katharina Althaus	Germany	85,0	88,0	210,2
18.	Tara Geraghty-Moats	USA	85,0	87,5	208,8
19.	Line Jahr	Norway	84,5	87,0	206,8
20.	Sofia Tikhonova	Russia	86,5	85,5	206,0
21.	Julia Clair	France	89,0	83,5	205,3
22.	Ulrike Graessler	Germany	84,5	85,5	203,7
23.	Julia Kykkänen	Finland	85,0	81,5	194,4
24.	Katja Pozun	Slovenia	83,0	82,0	192,3
25.	Anna Odine Stroem	Norway	81,5	83,5	192,0
26.	Eva Logar	Slovenia	82,0	84,0	191,9
27.	Coline Mattel	France	81,0	82,5	190,9
28.	Gyda Enger	Norway	84,0	83,0	189,6
29.	Michael Dolezelova	Czech Republic	83,0	83,0	187,7
30.	Elena Runggaldier	Italy	83,5	80,5	184,8
31.	Yuka Seto	Japan	80,0	nq	90,3
32.	Lea Lemare	France	80.0	nq	89,6
33.	Evelyn Insam	Italy	80,0	nq	87,0
35.	Anastasiya Gladysheva	Russia	78,5	nq	84,8
36.	Kaori Iwabuchi	Japan	77,0	nq	82,0
37.	Li Xueyao	China	75,5	nq	78,2
38.	Chang Xinyue	China	75,0	nq	74,9
39.	Barbora Blazkova	Czech Republic	75,5	nq	73,5
40.	Susanna Forsstroem	Finland	71,5	nq	67,5

=== Men ===
==== Individual competition, HS100 (21.02.2015) ====
Rank	Jumper	Country	Jump 1	Jump 2	Points
1.	Rune Velta	Norway	95,5	95,5	252,7
2.	Severin Freund	Germany	95,5	96,0	252,3
3.	Stefan Kraft	Austria	95,0	95,0	248,3
4.	Roman Koudelka	Czech Republic	93,5	93,5	242,7
5,	Taku Takeuchi	Japan	93,0	93,0	241,6
6.	Anders Bardal	Norway	93,0	91,5	238,2
7.	Richard Freitag	Germany	91,5	90,5	233,7
8.	Jan Ziobro	Poland	91,5	91,5	228,6
9.	Anders Fannemel	Norway	92,0	89,0	227,6
10.	Marinus Kraus	Germany	90,5	91,0	227,1
11.	Andreas Wellinger	Germany	91,0	90,5	226,0
12.	Daiki Ito	Japan	91,0	89,0	225,3
13.	Peter Prevc	Slovenia	92,0	87,5	224,8
14.	Gregor Deschwanden	Switzerland	88,5	94,0	223,0
15.	Janne Ahonen	Finland	90,5	89,0	227,6
16.	Simon Ammann	Switzerland	88,0	94,5	221,5
17.	Kamil Stoch	Poland	90,0	89,0	220,2
17.	Klemens Murańka	Poland	92,0	88,0	220,2
19.	Anders Jacobsen	Norway	90,0	89,5	219,3
20.	Nejc Dezman	Slovenia	89,5	88,0	217,1
21.	Michael Hayboeck	Austria	87,0	90,5	216,5
22.	Gregor Schlierenzauer	Austria	89,0	88,5	215,9
23.	Jernej Damjan	Slovenia	87,5	90,5	215,4
24.	Mikhail Maksimochkin	Russia	90,0	89,0	214,5
25.	Junshiro Kobayashi	Japan	89,5	89,0	214,3
26.	Ronan Lamy Chappuis	France	89,5	87,5	213,2
27.	Thomas Diethart	Austria	88,0	89,5	209,5
28.	Jakub Janda	Czech Republic	87,5	88,0	208,4
29.	Vincent Descombes Sevoie	France	87,0	87,5	206,6
30.	Vladimir Zografski	Bulgaria	87,5	84,0	199,3
31.	Kilian Peier	Switzerland	87,5	nq	101,5
32.	Lukas Hlava	Czech Republic	87,0	nq	101,2
33.	Piotr Żyła	Poland	89,5	nq	101,1
35.	Jarkko Määttä	Finland	86,0	nq	101,0
36.	Noriaki Kasai	Japan	86,5	nq	100,9
37.	Davide Bresadola	Italy	85,0	nq	99,1
38.	Jan Matura	Czech Republic	86,5	nq	98,7
39.	Lauri Asikainen	Finland	87,0	nq	98,4
40.	Dimitry Vassiliev	Russia	84,5	nq	94,4
41.	Jurij Tepes	Slovenia	83,5	nq	93,9
42.	Ilmir Hazetdinov	Russia	86,5	nq	92,1
42.	Luca Egloff	Switzerland	83,5	nq	92,1
44.	Sebastian Colloredo	Italy	82,0	nq	91,5
45.	Vladislav Boyarintsev	Russia	81,0	nq	87,8
46.	Daniele Varesco	Italy	81,5	nq	87,4
47.	Ville Larinto	Finland	80,0	nq	84,8
48.	Federico Cecon	Italy	79,5	nq	84,1
49.	Johann Andre Forfang	Norway	88,5	nq	DSQ
50.	William Rhoads	USA	83,5	nq	DSQ

==== Individual competition, HS134 (26.02.2015) ====
Rank	Jumper	Country	Jump 1	Jump 2	Points
1.	Severin Freund	Germany	134,0	135,5	268,7
2.	Gregor Schlierenzauer	Austria	128,0	130,0	246,4
3.	Rune Velta	Norway	126,5	128,5	242,9
4.	Peter Prevc	Slovenia	134,0	125,5	241,8
5,	Stefan Kraft	Austria	125,0	125,5	237,7
6.	Anders Bardal	Norway	131,5	122,0	236,5
7.	Anders Fannemel	Norway	129,0	127,0	233,9
8.	Roman Koudelka	Czech Republic	123,5	124,5	233,6
9.	Piotr Żyła	Poland	123,0	121,5	229,8
10.	Markus Eisenbichler	Germany	122,5	127,5	227,9
11.	Noriaki Kasai	Japan	129,5	119,5	227,3
12.	Kamil Stoch	Poland	125,0	124,5	225,0
13.	Junshiro Kobayashi	Japan	119,0	130,0	222,7
14.	Michael Hayboeck	Austria	125,0	119,5	221,0
15.	Richard Freitag	Germany	124,0	120,5	219,0
16.	Jan Matura	Czech Republic	122,5	120,0	215,3
17.	Gregor Deschwanden	Switzerland	122,5	121,5	214,1
18.	Johann Andre Forfang	Norway	118,0	127,0	209,7
19.	Janne Ahonen	Finland	118,5	122,5	206,5
20.	Klemens Murańka	Poland	123,0	113,5	205,6
21.	Dimitry Vassiliev	Russia	115,5	125,5	201,6
22.	Jarkko Määttä	Finland	114,5	125,5	201,6
23.	Simon Ammann	Switzerland	125,0	114,0	199,5
24.	Taku Takeuchi	Japan	121,0	109,5	197,7
25.	Jernej Damjan	Slovenia	116,5	121,0	197,5
26.	Nejc Dezman	Slovenia	116,5	120,0	197,2
27.	Denis Kornilov	Russia	116,0	117,5	193,7
28.	Daiki Ito	Japan	119,0	111,0	192,1
29.	Dawid Kubacki	Poland	115,5	115,5	188,7
30.	Killian Peier	Switzerland	117,0	108,5	172,4
31.	Mikhail Maksimochkin	Russia	115,0	nq	93,1
32.	Manuel Poppinger	Austria	115,5	nq	91,1
33.	Jakub Janda	Czech Republic	112,0	nq	90,8
34.	Vincent Descombes Sevoie	France	113,0	nq	88,0
35.	Evgeniy Klimov	Russia	112,5	nq	86,7
36.	Davide Bresadola	Italy	112,5	nq	86,1
37.	Matjaz Pungertar	Slovenia	110,5	nq	85,3
38.	Choi Seou	South Korea	110,0	nq	83,2
39.	Lauri Asikainen	Finland	109,5	nq	82,4
40.	Aleksander Zniszczoł	Poland	110,0	nq	80,6
41.	Ronan Lamy Chappuis	France	108,0	nq	79,3
42.	Sebastian Colloredo	Italy	108,5	nq	77,2
43.	Harri Olli	Finland	107,0	nq	77,0
44.	Luca Egloff	Switzerland	105,0	nq	75,3
45.	Sabirzhan Muminov	Kazakhstan	105,0	nq	73,6
46.	Michael Glasder	USA	102,5	nq	68,3
47.	Vladimir Zografski	Bulgaria	103,5	nq	66,2
48.	Martti Nomme	Estland	96,0	nq	57,6
49.	Federico Cecon	Italy	96,5	nq	57,5
50.	Andreas Wellinger	Germany	DNS	DNS	DNS

==== Team competition, HS134 (28.02.2015) ====
Rank	Team	Jumper	Jump 1	Jump 2	Points	Total
1.	Norway	Anders Bardal	125,0	125,5	228,5	872,6
1.	Norway	Anders Jacobsen	125,0	123,0	206,8	872,6
1.	Norway	Anders Fannemel	126,5	127,5	221,8	872,6
1.	Norway	Rune Velta	124,0	121,0	215,5	872,6
2.	Austria	Stefan Kraft	131,5	126,5	234,4	853,2
2.	Austria	Michael Hayboeck	124,5	122,0	203,8	853,2
2.	Austria	Manuel Poppinger	115,5	129,5	203,0	853,2
2.	Austria	Gregor Schlierenzauer	119,0	129,0	212,0	853,2
3.	Poland	Piotr Żyła	123,0	123,0	216,2	848,1
3.	Poland	Klemens Murańka	120,5	128,0	212,1	848,1
3.	Poland	Jan Ziobro	116,0	125,5	192,8	848,1
3.	Poland	Kamil Stoch	129,5	126,0	227,0	848,1
4.	Japan	Junshiro Kobayashi	122,0	121,0	201,4	831,2
4.	Japan	Daiki Ito	120,5	122,5	201,3	831,2
4.	Japan	Taku Takeuchi	126,0	128,0	216,9	831,2
4.	Japan	Noriaki Kasai	127,0	122,0	211,6	831,2
5.	Germany	Michael Neumayer	118,0	118,0	193,1	809,5
5.	Germany	Markus Eisenbichler	120,5	119,5	193,7	809,5
5.	Germany	Richard Freitag	121,5	125,5	207,2	809,5
5.	Germany	Severin Freund	123,5	143,0	215,2	809,5
6.	Slovenia	Jurij Tepes	126,0	116,0	207,7	797,5
6.	Slovenia	Nejc Dezman	117,0	121,5	195,1	797,5
6.	Slovenia	Jernej Damjan	120,0	120,0	186,2	797,5
6.	Slovenia	Peter Prevc	117,5	133,0	208,5	797,5
7.	Russia	Denis Kornilov	114,0	114,0	176,3	703,5
7.	Russia	Ilmir Hazetdinov	124,5	104,5	167,9	703,5
7.	Russia	Dimitry Vassiliev	115,0	126,5	187,9	703,5
7.	Russia	Mikhail Maksimochkin	121,5	110,0	171,4	703,5
8.	Czech Republic	Jakub Janda	114,0	113,5	167,5	692,0
8.	Czech Republic	Lukáš Hlava	104,5	113,5	147,0	692,0
8.	Czech Republic	Jan Matura	122,5	122,0	200,3	692,0
8.	Czech Republic	Roman Koudelka	116,0	120,5	177,2	692,0

=== Mixed competition ===
==== Mixed team competition, HS100 (22.02.2015) ====
Rank	Team	Jumper	Jump 1	Jump 2	Points	Total
1.	Germany	Carina Vogt	93,5	92,0	221,7	917,9
1.	Germany	Richard Freitag	93,5	92,0	230,7	917,9
1.	Germany	Katharina Althaus	91,0	92,5	216,0	917,9
1.	Germany	Severin Freund	97,0	96,0	249,8	917,9
2.	Norway	Line Jahr	93,5	90,5	216,0	915,6
2.	Norway	Anders Bardal	92,5	89,5	222,4	915,6
2.	Norway	Maren Lundby	95,0	91,5	231,9	915,6
2.	Norway	Rune Velta	95,0	95,5	245,3	915,6
3.	Japan	Sara Takanashi	96,5	93,0	226,3	888,3
3.	Japan	Noriaki Kasai	90,0	88,5	213,2	888,3
3.	Japan	Yūki Itō	88,5	90,5	211,8	888,3
3.	Japan	Taku Takeuchi	95,0	93,5	237,0	888,3
4.	Austria	Daniela Iraschko-Stolz	95,5	92,5	226,5	869,5
4.	Austria	Michael Hayboeck	83,0	87,5	195,3	869,5
4.	Austria	Jacqueline Seifriedsberger	96,5	90,0	216,4	869,5
4.	Austria	Stefan Kraft	91,0	95,0	231,3	869,5
5.	Slovenia	Maja Vtič	88,5	85,5	196,1	868,4
5.	Slovenia	Nejc Dežman	90,0	86,5	208,4	868,4
5.	Slovenia	Špela Rogelj	90,5	92,5	223,3	868,4
5.	Slovenia	Peter Prevc	95,5	94,5	240,6	868,4
6.	Russia	Irina Avvakumova	88,0	91,5	208,8	791,8
6.	Russia	Ilmir Hazetdinov	83,5	85,0	184,4	791,8
6.	Russia	Sofia Tikhonova	87,0	89,0	206,1	791,8
6.	Russia	Mikhail Maksimochkin	84,5	86,5	193,3	791,8
7.	USA	Nita Englund	94,0	87,5	209,3	789,3
7.	USA	Nick Alexander	82,5	90,5	171,2	789,3
7.	USA	Sarah Hendrickson	98,5	94,0	236,6	789,3
7.	USA	William Rhoads	78,5	83,0	172,2	789,3
8.	France	Léa Lemare	82,5	83,0	177,6	773,2
8.	France	Ronan Lamy Chappuis	84,0	86,0	194,2	773,2
8.	France	Julia Clair	88,0	86,5	199,0	773,2
8.	France	Vincent Descombes Sevoie	91,0	85,0	202,4	773,2
9.	Italy	Elena Runggaldier	84,0	nq	85,6	374,5
9.	Italy	Sebastian Colloredo	83,5	nq	87,7	374,5
9.	Italy	Evelyn Insam	86,0	nq	94,7	374,5
9.	Italy	Davide Bresadola	91,5	nq	106,5	374,5
10.	Finland	Julia Kykkänen	86,0	nq	96,8	369,5
10.	Finland	Jarkko Määttä	87,5	nq	97,4	369,5
10.	Finland	Susanna Forsström	76,5	nq	72,1	369,5
10.	Finland	Janne Ahonen	89,0	nq	103,2	369,5
11.	Czech Republic	Michaela Doleželová	85,0	nq	86,2	351,2
11.	Czech Republic	Victor Polasek	84,0	nq	90,9	351,2
11.	Czech Republic	Barbora Blažkova	80,5	nq	80,0	351,2
11.	Czech Republic	Jan Matura	84,0	nq	94,1	351,2
