= FIS Nordic World Ski Championships 2015 – Team large hill =

Team large hill at the FIS Nordic World Ski Championships 2015
- Date: 28 February 2015
- Competitors: 52 from 13 nations
- Winning points: 872.6

Medalists
gold medal	Anders Bardal; Anders Jacobsen; Anders Fannemel; Rune Velta	Norway
silver medal	Stefan Kraft; Michael Hayböck; Manuel Poppinger; Gregor Schlierenzauer	Austria
bronze medal	Piotr Żyła; Klemens Murańka; Jan Ziobro; Kamil Stoch	Poland

The Team large hill event of the FIS Nordic World Ski Championships 2015 was held on 28 February 2015.

== Results ==
The first round was started at 17:15 and the second round at 18:35.

Rank	Bib	Country	Round 1 Distance (m)	Round 1 Points	Round 1 Rank	Final Round Distance (m)	Final Round Points	Final Round Rank	Total Points
1st place, gold medalist(s)	12	Norway; Anders Bardal; Anders Jacobsen; Anders Fannemel; Rune Velta	125.0; 125.0; 126.5; 124.0	429.9; 110.7; 105.7; 105.9; 107.6	1	125.5; 123.0; 127.5; 121.0	442.7; 117.8; 101.1; 115.9; 107.9	1	872.6; 228.5; 206.8; 221.8; 215.5
2nd place, silver medalist(s)	11	Austria; Stefan Kraft; Michael Hayböck; Manuel Poppinger; Gregor Schlierenzauer	131.5; 124.5; 115.5; 119.0	410.5; 120.2; 106.8; 91.0; 92.5	3	126.5; 122.0; 129.5; 129.0	442.7; 114.2; 97.0; 112.0; 119.5	2	853.2; 234.4; 203.8; 203.0; 212.0
3rd place, bronze medalist(s)	7	Poland; Piotr Żyła; Klemens Murańka; Jan Ziobro; Kamil Stoch	123.0; 120.5; 116.0; 129.5	407.9; 108.0; 99.2; 87.3; 113.4	4	123.0; 128.0; 125.5; 126.0	440.2; 108.2; 112.9; 105.5; 113.6	3	848.1; 216.2; 212.1; 192.8; 227.0
4	9	Japan; Junshiro Kobayashi; Daiki Ito; Taku Takeuchi; Noriaki Kasai	122.0; 120.5; 126.0; 127.0	411.8; 101.4; 99.1; 106.3; 105.0	2	121.0; 122.5; 128.0; 122.0	419.4; 100.0; 102.2; 110.6; 106.6	4	831.2; 201.4; 201.3; 216.9; 211.6
5	13	Germany; Michael Neumayer; Markus Eisenbichler; Richard Freitag; Severin Freund	118.0; 120.5; 121.5; 123.5	394.3; 91.6; 99.0; 102.0; 101.7	5	119.0; 119.5; 125.5; 143.0	414.9; 101.5; 94.7; 105.2; 113.5	5	809.2; 193.1; 193.7; 207.2; 215.2
6	10	Slovenia; Jurij Tepeš; Nejc Dežman; Jernej Damjan; Peter Prevc	126.0; 117.0; 120.0; 117.5	385.3; 110.7; 94.4; 93.0; 87.2	6	116.0; 121.5; 120.0; 133.0	412.2; 97.0; 100.7; 93.2; 121.3	6	797.5; 207.7; 195.1; 186.2; 208.5
7	4	Russia; Denis Kornilov; Ilmir Hazetdinov; Dimitry Vassiliev; Mikhail Maksimochkin	114.0; 124.5; 115.0; 121.5	361.6; 86.3; 95.8; 85.8; 93.7	7	114.0; 104.5; 126.5; 110.0	341.9; 90.0; 72.1; 102.1; 77.7	8	703.5; 176.3; 167.9; 187.9; 171.4
8	8	Czech Republic; Jakub Janda; Lukáš Hlava; Jan Matura; Roman Koudelka	114.0; 104.5; 122.5; 116.0	332.4; 83.1; 66.3; 99.4; 83.6	8	113.5; 113.5; 122.0; 120.5	359.6; 84.4; 80.7; 100.9; 93.6	7	692.0; 167.5; 147.0; 200.3; 177.2
9	5	Finland; Jarkko Määttä; Lauri Asikainen; Ville Larinto; Janne Ahonen	124.0; 107.5; 111.5; 109.0	328.5; 100.9; 72.5; 77.3; 77.8	9				
10	6	Switzerland; Killian Peier; Gregor Deschwanden; Gabriel Karlen; Simon Ammann	110.5; 111.5; 94.5; 127.0	314.2; 74.6; 82.6; 46.5; 110.5	10				
11	2	South Korea; Choi Heung-chul; Kim Hyun-ki; Kang Chil-ku; Choi Seou	105.5; 95.5; 103.0; 112.5	253.2; 60.7; 47.2; 62.7; 82.6	11				
12	3	Italy; Daniele Varesco; Sebastian Colloredo; Davide Bresadola; Federico Cecon	94.0; 101.0; 108.0; 97.0	214.7; 42.2; 54.0; 62.4; 56.1	12				
13	1	Sweden; Simon Eklund; Jonas Sandell; Christian Inngjerdingen; Carl Nordin	85.5; 85.5; 94.0; 97.0	144.5; 21.9; 25.8; 46.8; 50.0	13				
