= Federico Cecon =

Italian ski jumper

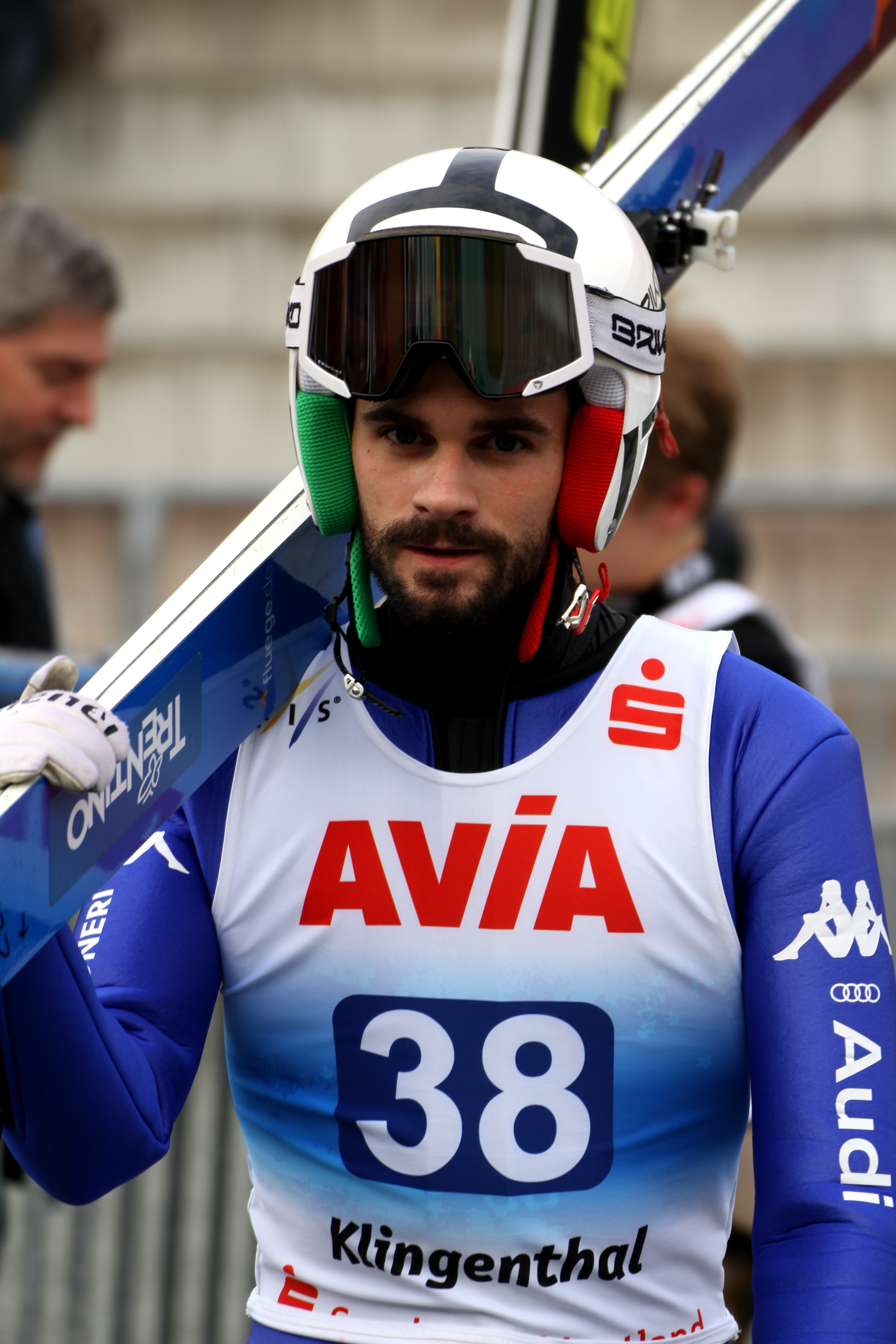
- Cecon in 2017
- Born: 11 June 1994 (age 30); Tolmezzo, Udine, Italy
- Height: 173 cm (5 ft 8 in)

Federico Cecon (born 11 June 1994) is an Italian ski jumper. He is the son of the Italian former ski jumper Roberto Cecon (born 1971).

== Biography ==
He competed for Italy at the 2018 Winter Olympics. In the men's normal hill, he finished 49th in qualifying with 87.9 points and advanced to the final round. Cecon had previously competed at the 2015 World Championships, finishing 48th in the individual normal hill, 49th in the individual large hill, and 12th in the team large hill.
