= Simon Eklund =

Swedish ski jumper

Personal information
- Full name: Simon Eklund
- Born: 10 May 1996 (age 30)

Sport
- Sport: Skiing
- Club: Holmens IF

World Cup career
- Seasons: -
Medal record
Men's ski jumping
Representing Sweden

Simon Eklund (born 10 May 1996) is a Swedish ski jumper.

He represented Sweden at the FIS Nordic World Ski Championships 2015 in Falun.
