= Klemens Murańka =

Polish ski jumper

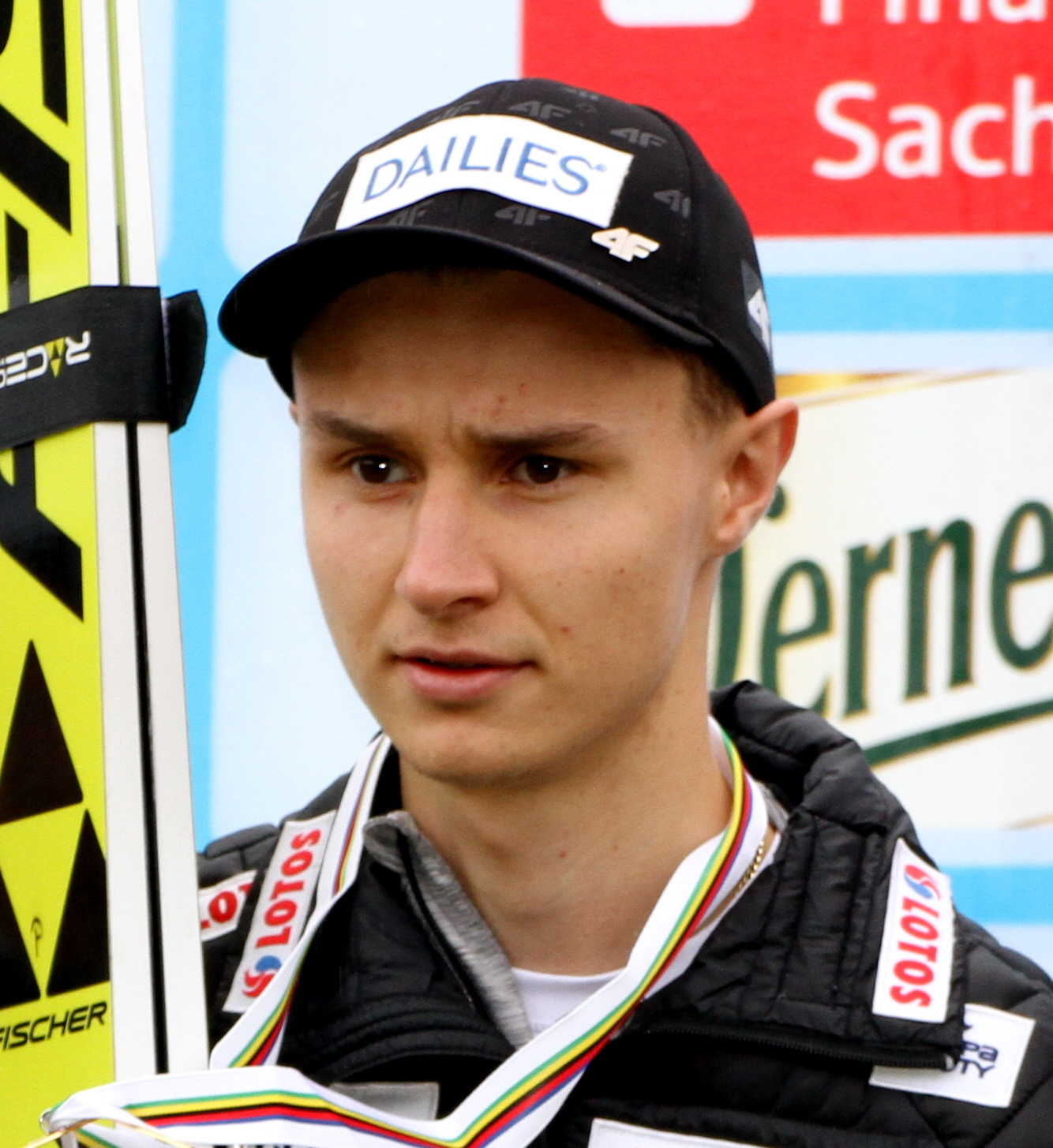
- Murańka in 2017

Personal information
- Full name: Klemens Murańka
- Nationality: Poland
- Born: 31 August 1994 (age 31) Zakopane, Poland
- Height: 182 cm (6 ft 0 in)
- Spouse: Agnieszka Rzadkosz

Sport
- Sport: Skiing
- Club: TS Wisła Zakopane

World Cup career
- Seasons: 2008–present
- Indiv. starts: 92
- Team podiums: 2

Achievements and titles
- Personal bests: 221.5 m (727 ft); Planica, 20 March 2015
Medal record
Men's ski jumping
World Championships
Bronze medal – third place	2015 Falun	Team LH
World Junior Championship
Gold medal – first place	2014 Val di Fiemme	Team NH
Silver medal – second place	2012 Erzurum	Team NH
Silver medal – second place	2013 Liberec	Individual NH
Silver medal – second place	2013 Liberec	Team NH

Klemens Murańka (born 31 August 1994) is a retired Polish ski jumper, a member of the national team, a 2014 Junior World Champion in team, a bronze medalist of 2015 World Championship in team.

== Personal life ==
On 25 April 2015 he married Agnieszka Rzadkosz. On 28 August 2014 she gave birth to their son named Klemens (Jr.) On 4 January 2021 their second son was born.

== Career ==
On 31 August 2004, his 10th birthday, he jumped 135.5 m at Wielka Krokiew in Zakopane (only 4.5 m shorter than the then-official record). On 14 October 2007 he took third place in Summer Polish Championship. In December 2007 he achieved bronze in the Winter Polish Championship.

Murańka debuted in World Cup during qualification to competition in Zakopane in season 2007/08 at age 13. He is the youngest competitor in history who was allowed to take part in World Cup. He took 65th place in qualification.

On 4 March 2012 Klemens scored his first points in the FIS World Cup on the Salpausselkä K90 Ski Jump being 21st in the competition.

On 1 February 2014 he won a gold medal with Polish team in squad Jakub Wolny, Krzysztof Biegun and Aleksander Zniszczoł at 2014 Junior World Championship held in Val di Fiemme.

Murańka debuted in the World Championships 2015 in Falun, Sweden. He was 17th on normal hill (K-90) and 20th in the competition on the large hill Lugnet (K-120). On 28 February 2015 Polish team in squad: Murańka, Piotr Żyła, Kamil Stoch and Jan Ziobro achieved bronze medal of World Championships 2015 in team.

On 29 January 2021 he jumped 153 meters during the qualification round of the Willingen Six tournament on the Mühlenkopfschanze in Willingen and beat by one meter the previous hill record which belonged to Janne Ahonen (2005) and Jurij Tepes (2014). He became third Polish ski jumper who jumped 150 or more meters on this hill. It was the first hill record in his career.

On 10 September 2025 he announced his retirement.

== World Championships ==
=== Individual ===
2015 (Sweden) Falun	–	17th place (K-90), 20th place (K-120)

=== Team ===
2015 (Sweden) Falun	–	bronze medal (K-120)

=== Klemens Murańka's starts at World Championships ===
Place	Day	Year	Locality	Hill	Point K	HS	Competition	Jump 1	Jump 2	Note (points)	Loss (points)	Winner
17.	21 February	2015	(Sweden) Falun	Lugnet	K-90	HS-100	individual	92.0 m	88.0 m	220.2	32.5	Rune Velta
20.	26 February	2015	(Sweden) Falun	Lugnet	K-120	HS-134	individual	123.0 m	113.5 m	205.6	63.1	Severin Freund
3.	28 February	2015	(Sweden) Falun	Lugnet	K-120	HS-134	team	120.5	128.0	848.1 (212.5)	44.5	Norway

== World Cup ==
=== Season standings ===
Season	Overall	Ski-Flying	Four Hills Tournament	Raw Air	Willingen Five
2010–11	–	–	–	–	–
2011–12	55	40	–	–	–
2012–13	75	–	51	–	–
2013–14	38	33	21	–	–
2014–15	42	39	61	–	–
2015–16	50	–	–	–	–
2016–17	65	–	50	64	–
2019–20	61	–	–	–	37
2020–21					

=== Individual starts ===
Season	1	2	3	4	5	6	7	8	9	10	11	12	13	14	15	16	17	18	19	20	21	22	23	24	25	26	27	28	29	30	31	Points
2007/08	Kuusamo	Trondheim	Trondheim	Villach	Villach	Engelberg	Engelberg	Oberstdorf	Garmisch-Partenkirchen	Bischofshofen	Bischofshofen	Predazzo	Predazzo	Harrachov	Zakopane	Zakopane	Sapporo	Sapporo	Liberec	Liberec	Willingen	Kuopio	Kuopio	Lillehammer	Oslo	Planica	Planica					0
2007/08	–	–	–	–	–	–	–	–	–	–	–	–	–	–	q	–	–	–	–	–	–	–	–	–	–	–	–					0
2009/10	Kuusamo	Lillehammer	Lillehammer	Engelberg	Engelberg	Engelberg	Oberstdorf	Garmisch-Partenkirchen	Innsbruck	Bischofshofen	Bad Mitterndorf	Bad Mitterndorf	Sapporo	Sapporo	Zakopane	Zakopane	Oberstdorf	Klingenthal	Willingen	Lahti	Kuopio	Lillehammer	Oslo									0
2009/10	–	–	–	–	–	–	–	–	–	–	–	–	–	–	q	q	–	–	–	–	–	–	–									0
2010/11	Kuusamo	Kuopio	Lillehammer	Lillehammer	Engelberg	Engelberg	Engelberg	Oberstdorf	Garmisch-Partenkirchen	Innsbruck	Bischofshofen	Harrachov	Harrachov	Sapporo	Sapporo	Zakopane	Zakopane	Zakopane	Willingen	Klingenthal	Oberstdorf	Vikersund	Vikersund	Lahti	Planica	Planica						0
2010/11	q	q	q	q	–	–	–	–	–	–	–	–	–	–	–	37	51	–	–	–	–	–	–	–	–	–						0
2011/12	Kuusamo	Lillehammer	Lillehammer	Harrachov	Harrachov	Engelberg	Engelberg	Oberstdorf	Garmisch-Partenkirchen	Innsbruck	Bischofshofen	Bad Mitterndorf	Bad Mitterndorf	Zakopane	Zakopane	Sapporo	Sapporo	Predazzo	Predazzo	Willingen	Oberstdorf	Lahti	Trondheim	Oslo	Planica	Planica						26
2011/12	–	–	–	–	–	–	–	–	–	–	–	–	–	39	40	–	–	–	–	–	–	21	33	24	22	–						26
2012/13	Lillehammer	Lillehammer	Kuusamo	Krasnaja Polana	Krasnaja Polana	Engelberg	Engelberg	Oberstdorf	Garmisch-Partenkirchen	Innsbruck	Bischofshofen	Wisła	Zakopane	Sapporo	Sapporo	Vikersund	Vikersund	Harrachov	Harrachov	Klingenthal	Oberstdorf	Lahti	Kuopio	Trondheim	Oslo	Planica	Planica					6
2012/13	–	–	–	–	–	28	40	28	q	–	–	q	q	–	–	–	–	–	–	–	33	–	–	–	–	–	–					6
2013/14	Klingenthal	Kuusamo	Lillehammer	Lillehammer	Titisee-Neustadt	Titisee-Neustadt	Engelberg	Engelberg	Oberstdorf	Garmisch-Partenkirchen	Innsbruck	Bischofshofen	Tauplitz	Tauplitz	Wisła	Zakopane	Sapporo	Sapporo	Willingen	Willingen	Falun	Lahti	Lahti	Kuopio	Trondheim	Oslo	Planica	Planica				132
2013/14	–	–	–	–	24	39	7	24	14	17	20	37	–	27	18	13	–	–	–	–	29	q	q	31	39	q	35	45				132
2014/15	Klingenthal	Kuusamo	Kuusamo	Lillehammer	Lillehammer	Nizhny Tagil	Nizhny Tagil	Engelberg	Engelberg	Oberstdorf	Garmisch-Partenkirchen	Innsbruck	Bischofshofen	Tauplitz	Wisła	Zakopane	Sapporo	Sapporo	Willingen	Willingen	Titisee-Neustadt	Titisee-Neustadt	Vikersund	Vikersund	Lahti	Kuopio	Trondheim	Oslo	Oslo	Planica	Planica	102
2014/15	–	–	–	21	q	35	45	38	40	q	47	–	–	–	22	26	–	–	30	–	34	21	–	–	38	46	17	18	10	17	–	102
2015/16	Klingenthal	Lillehammer	Lillehammer	Nizhny Tagil	Nizhny Tagil	Engelberg	Engelberg	Oberstdorf	Garmisch-Partenkirchen	Innsbruck	Bischofshofen	Willingen	Zakopane	Sapporo	Sapporo	Trondheim	Vikersund	Vikersund	Vikersund	Lahti	Lahti	Kuopio	Almaty	Almaty	Wisła	Titisee-Neustadt	Planica	Planica	Planica			36
2015/16	49	23	q	44	19	41	28	q	q	–	–	–	q	–	30	–	–	–	–	22	28	32	–	–	44	–	–	–	–			36
2016/17	Kuusamo	Kuusamo	Klingenthal	Lillehammer	Lillehammer	Engelberg	Engelberg	Oberstdorf	Garmisch-Partenkirchen	Innsbruck	Bischofshofen	Wisła	Wisła	Zakopane	Willingen	Oberstdorf	Oberstdorf	Sapporo	Sapporo	Pyeongchang	Pyeongchang	Oslo	Trondheim	Vikersund	Planica	Planica						4
2016/17	37	44	35	27	q	43	44	40	q	41	–	q	39	–	–	–	–	–	–	–	–	q	34	q	–	–						4
2017/18	Wisła	Kuusamo	Nizhny Tagil	Nizhny Tagil	Titisee-Neustadt	Engelberg	Engelberg	Oberstdorf	Garmisch-Partenkirchen	Innsbruck	Bischofshofen	Tauplitz	Tauplitz	Zakopane	Willingen	Willingen	Lahti	Oslo	Lillehammer	Trondheim	Vikersund	Planica	Planica									0
2017/18	q	–	–	–	–	–	–	–	–	–	–	–	–	–	–	–	–	–	–	–	–	–	–									0
2018/19	Wisła	Kuusamo	Kuusamo	Nizhny Tagil	Nizhny Tagil	Engelberg	Engelberg	Oberstdorf	Garmisch-Partenkirchen	Innsbruck	Bischofshofen	Predazzo	Predazzo	Zakopane	Sapporo	Sapporo	Oberstdorf	Oberstdorf	Oberstdorf	Lahti	Willingen	Willingen	Oslo	Lillehammer	Trondheim	Vikersund	Planica	Planica				0
2018/19	q	–	–	–	–	–	–	–	–	–	–	–	–	49	–	–	–	–	–	–	–	–	–	–	–	–	–	–				0
2019/20	Wisła HS134	Kuusamo HS142	Nizhny Tagil HS134	Nizhny Tagil HS134	Klingenthal HS140	Engelberg HS140	Engelberg HS140	Oberstdorf HS137	Garmisch-Partenkirchen HS142	Innsbruck HS130	Bischofshofen HS142	Predazzo HS104	Predazzo HS104	Titisee-Neustadt HS142	Titisee-Neustadt HS142	Zakopane HS140	Sapporo HS137	Sapporo HS137	Willingen HS145	Tauplitz HS235	Tauplitz HS235	Râșnov HS97	Râșnov HS97	Lahti HS130	Lahti HS130	Lillehammer HS140	Lillehammer HS140					8
2019/20	q	46	45	39	27	39	44	—	—	—	—	—	—	—	—	—	46	q	41	46	38	40	27	42	58	—	—					8
2020/21	Wisła HS134	Kuusamo HS142	Kuusamo HS142	Nizhny Tagil HS134	Nizhny Tagil HS134	Engelberg HS140	Engelberg HS140	Oberstdorf HS137	Garmisch-Partenkirchen HS142	Innsbruck HS130	Bischofshofen HS142	Titisee-Neustadt HS142	Titisee-Neustadt HS142	Zakopane HS140	Lahti HS130	Willingen HS147	Willingen HS147	Klingenthal HS140	Klingenthal HS140	Zakopane HS140	Zakopane HS140	Râșnov HS97	Oslo HS134	Lillehammer HS140	Trondheim HS138	Vikersund HS240	Planica HS240	Planica HS240				61
2020/21	22	9	q	–	–	34	22	30	22	41	32	–	–	27	–																	61
