= Christian Inngjerdingen =

Swedish ski jumper (born 1996)

Personal information
- Full name: Christian Inngjerdingen
- Born: 19 December 1996 (age 29)

Sport
- Sport: Skiing
- Club: Holmens IF
Medal record
Men's ski jumping
Representing Sweden

Christian Inngjerdingen (born 19 December 1996) is a Swedish ski jumper.

He represented Sweden at the FIS Nordic World Ski Championships 2015 in Falun.
