= Rune Velta =

Norwegian ski jumper

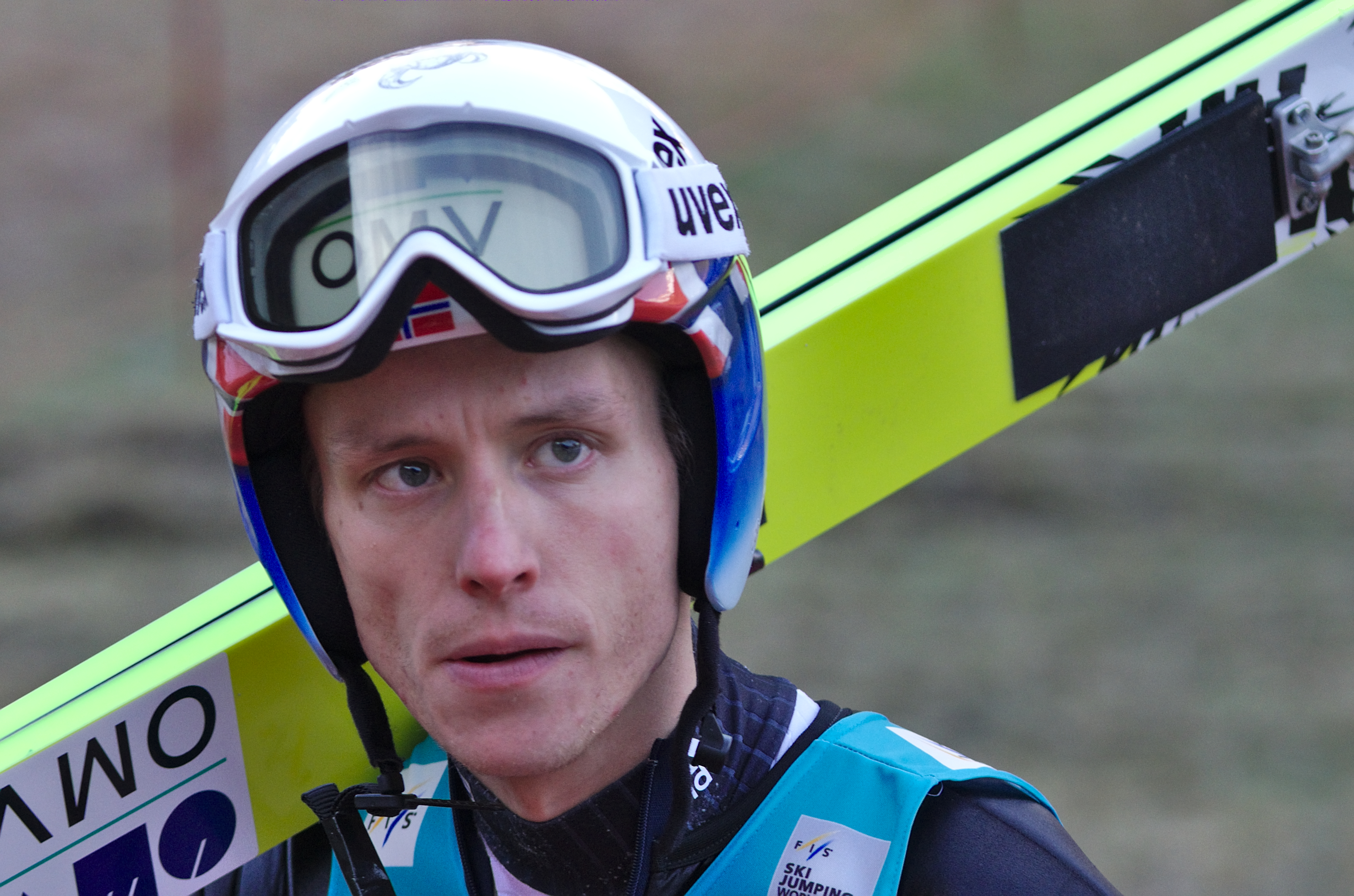
- Velta in Engelberg, 2014

Personal information
- Full name: Rune Velta
- Nationality: (Norway) Norwegian
- Born: 19 July 1989 (age 37)
- Height: 1.78 m (5 ft 10 in)

Sport
- Sport: Skiing

World Cup career
- Seasons: 2010–2016
- Indiv. podiums: 6

Achievements and titles
- Personal bests: 243 m (797 ft); Vikersund, 26 February 2012
Medal record
World Championships
Gold medal – first place	2015 Falun	Individual NH
Gold medal – first place	2015 Falun	Team LH
Silver medal – second place	2015 Falun	Mixed team NH
Bronze medal – third place	2015 Falun	Individual LH
Ski Flying World Championships
Silver medal – second place	2012 Vikersund	Individual

Rune Velta (Norwegian pronunciation: [ˈrʉ̂ːnə ˈvɛ̀ltɑ]; born 19 July 1989) is a Norwegian former ski jumper.

== Career ==
On 25 February 2012, Velta finished second in the Ski Flying World Championships in Vikersund, behind winner Robert Kranjec. He made his World Cup debut in March 2010 in Oslo, where he finished 43rd. The week before he had recorded his best placements in the Continental Cup, with a sixth and a fifth place in the same city. He first finished among the top 30 in the World Cup with a 17th place from December 2010 in Lillehammer. This was followed by 10th place the next day.

Velta was the only male ski jumper who won medals in all competitions at the FIS Nordic World Ski Championships 2015. He retired one year later after disputes with head coach Alexander Stöckl.

Velta was head coach of the Swiss national team from 2023 until 2025.

He hails from Bærums Verk, and represents Lommedalens IL.
