= William Rhoads =

American ski jumper

Personal information
- Nationality: United States
- Born: 8 June 1995 (age 31) Park City, Utah, United States

Sport
- Sport: Skiing
- Club: UOP Sports Clubs

World Cup career
- Seasons: 2015–present
- Indiv. starts: 19
- Team starts: 9

Achievements and titles
- Personal bests: 200.5 m (658 ft); Planica, 17 March 2016
- Updated on 25 March 2018

William Rhoads (born 8 June 1995) is an American ski jumper.

== Career ==
He made his World Cup debut 2015 season in Kuopio with 42nd place. He represented US at the FIS Nordic World Ski Championships 2015 in Falun where he was disqualified on normal hill individual event.

== World Cup ==
=== Standings ===
Season	Overall	4H	SF	RA	W5	P7
2014/15	—	—	—	N/A	N/A	N/A
2015/16	—	—	—	N/A	N/A	N/A
2016/17	—	58	—	57	N/A	N/A
2017/18	57	—	—	—	43	65

=== Individual starts (19) ===
Season	1	2	3	4	5	6	7	8	9	10	11	12	13	14	15	16	17	18	19	20	21	22	23	24	25	26	27	28	29	30	31	Points
2014/15	Klingenthal	Kuusamo	Kuusamo	Lillehammer	Lillehammer	Nizhny Tagil	Nizhny Tagil	Engelberg	Engelberg	Oberstdorf	Garmisch-Partenkirchen	Innsbruck	Bischofshofen	Tauplitz	Wisła	Zakopane	Sapporo	Sapporo	Willingen	Willingen	Titisee-Neustadt	Titisee-Neustadt	Vikersund	Vikersund	Lahti	Kuopio	Trondheim	Oslo	Oslo	Planica	Planica	0
2014/15	q	–	–	–	–	–	–	–	–	–	–	–	–	–	–	–	q	–	–	–	–	–	–	–	q	42	–	–	–	–	–	0
2015/16	Klingenthal	Lillehammer	Lillehammer	Nizhny Tagil	Nizhny Tagil	Engelberg	Engelberg	Oberstdorf	Garmisch-Partenkirchen	Innsbruck	Bischofshofen	Willingen	Zakopane	Sapporo	Sapporo	Trondheim	Vikersund	Vikersund	Vikersund	Lahti	Lahti	Kuopio	Almaty	Almaty	Wisła	Titisee-Neustadt	Planica	Planica	Planica			0
2015/16	–	–	–	q	–	–	–	–	–	–	–	–	–	q	47	–	–	–	–	–	–	–	45	–	q	–	–	–	–			0
2016/17	Kuusamo	Kuusamo	Klingenthal	Lillehammer	Lillehammer	Engelberg	Engelberg	Oberstdorf	Garmisch-Partenkirchen	Innsbruck	Bischofshofen	Wisła	Wisła	Zakopane	Willingen	Oberstdorf	Oberstdorf	Sapporo	Sapporo	Pyeongchang	Pyeongchang	Oslo	Trondheim	Vikersund	Planica	Planica						0
2016/17	DQ	43	q	43	44	49	q	q	q	–	39	q	50	47	–	35	40	–	–	–	–	q	q	q	q	–						0
2017/18	Wisła	Kuusamo	Nizhny Tagil	Nizhny Tagil	Titisee-Neustadt	Engelberg	Engelberg	Oberstdorf	Garmisch-Partenkirchen	Innsbruck	Bischofshofen	Tauplitz	Zakopane	Willingen	Willingen	Lahti	Oslo	Lillehammer	Trondheim	Vikersund	Planica	Planica										12
2017/18	–	47	21	29	q	48	q	–	–	–	q	q	–	44	40	q	–	–	–	–	q	–										12
