= Nico Polychronidis =

German Greek Olympic ski jumper (born 1989)

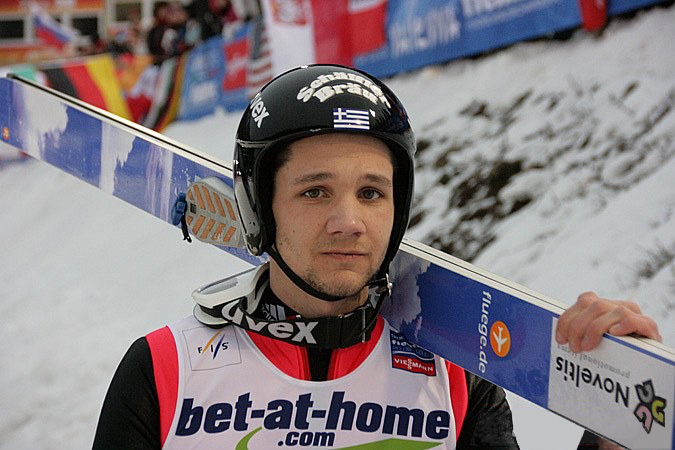
- Val di Fiemme 2013 (normal hill individual)
- Born: 8 November 1989; Bremen, Germany
- Known for: being the first Greek Olympic ski jumper

Nico Polychronidis (born 8 November 1989) is a German and Greek Olympic ski jumper. He competes for Greece.

== Life ==
Polychronidis was born in Bremen in Germany. He entered a specialist skiing school at the age of twelve after precociously jumping on skis at the age of six. His first jump was in 1998 and at an FIS Continental Cup event in Pragelato in Italy he achieved a third place in 2009. He competed for Germany until he realised in 2012 that he had a better chance of competing at the Olympics if he was to use his Greek nationality. Polychronidis was born in Germany and his mother was German but he was able to claim Greek nationality through his Greek father. In order to switch teams he had to stop competing for a year with his first World Cup event being at Klingenthal 2013. He was able to attend the opening ceremony at the Sochi Olympics on 7 February 2014 in the Greek Winter Olympic team.
