= Stefan Kraft =

Austrian ski jumper (born 1993)

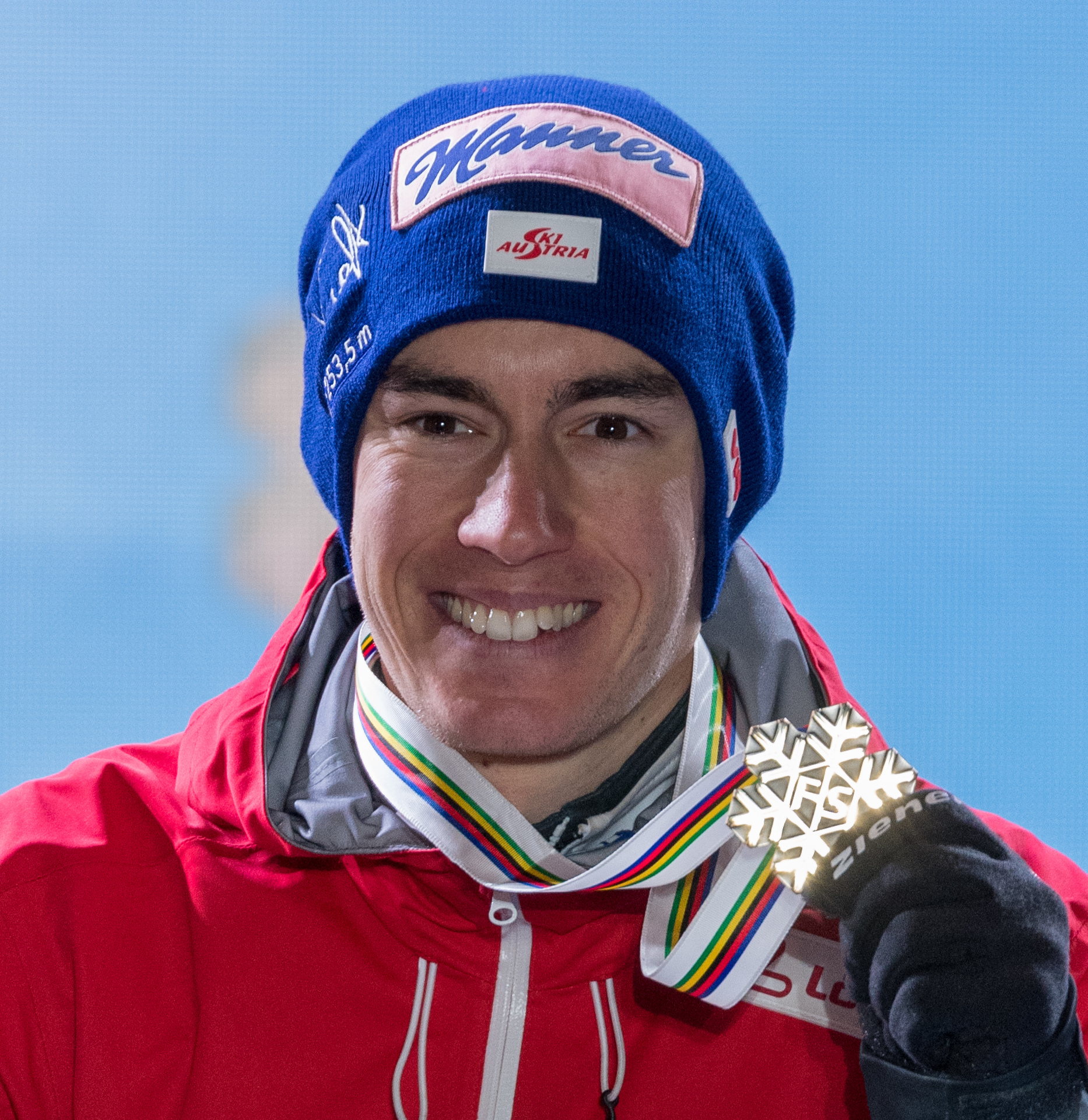
- Kraft in 2019

Personal information
- Nationality: Austria
- Born: 13 May 1993 (age 33) Schwarzach im Pongau, Austria
- Height: 1.70 m (5 ft 7 in)

Sport
- Sport: Skiing
- Club: SV Schwarzach

World Cup career
- Seasons: 2012–present
- Indiv. starts: 330
- Indiv. podiums: 129
- Indiv. wins: 46
- Team starts: 65
- Team podiums: 48
- Team wins: 18
- Overall titles: 3 (2017, 2020, 2024)
- Four Hills titles: 1 (2015)
- Ski Flying titles: 3 (2017, 2020, 2023)
- Raw Air titles: 3 (2017, 2022, 2024)

Achievements and titles
- Personal bests: 253.5 m (832 ft); Vikersund, 18 March 2017
Medal record
Representing Austria
Men's ski jumping
Olympic Games
Gold medal – first place	2022 Beijing	Team LH
World Championships
Gold medal – first place	2017 Lahti	Individual NH
Gold medal – first place	2017 Lahti	Individual LH
Gold medal – first place	2021 Oberstdorf	Individual LH
Silver medal – second place	2015 Falun	Team LH
Silver medal – second place	2017 Lahti	Mixed team NH
Silver medal – second place	2019 Seefeld	Team LH
Silver medal – second place	2019 Seefeld	Mixed team NH
Silver medal – second place	2021 Oberstdorf	Team LH
Silver medal – second place	2025 Trondheim	Team LH
Bronze medal – third place	2015 Falun	Individual NH
Bronze medal – third place	2017 Lahti	Team LH
Bronze medal – third place	2019 Seefeld	Individual NH
Bronze medal – third place	2021 Oberstdorf	Mixed team NH
Bronze medal – third place	2023 Planica	Team LH
Bronze medal – third place	2025 Trondheim	Mixed team LH
Men's ski flying
World Championships
Gold medal – first place	2024 Bad Mitterndorf	Individual
Silver medal – second place	2024 Bad Mitterndorf	Team
Silver medal – second place	2026 Oberstdorf	Team
Bronze medal – third place	2016 Bad Mitterndorf	Individual
Bronze medal – third place	2016 Bad Mitterndorf	Team
Bronze medal – third place	2022 Vikersund	Individual
- Updated on 30 March 2025

Stefan Kraft (born 13 May 1993) is an Austrian ski jumper. He is one of the most successful ski jumpers of all time, having won the Ski Jumping World Cup and Ski Flying World Cup overall titles three times each, the Four Hills Tournament once and Raw Air Tournament three times, and three individual gold medals at the World Championships. From 2017 to 2025, he held the ski flying world record of 253.5 metres (832 ft).

== Career ==
In January 2012, Kraft debuted in the FIS Ski Jumping World Cup in Bischofshofen. He has three world cup wins and placed first overall in the 2014/15 Four Hills Tournament. His personal best and world record is 253.5 meters set in Vikersund in 2017, only a meter away from Domen Prevc's 254.5-meter jump, the longest to date. At the FIS Nordic World Ski Championships 2015 in Falun, he won a silver medal in the Men's team large hill event and a bronze medal in the Individual normal hill event.

In March 2017, he clinched his first overall FIS Ski Jumping World Cup title.

== World Cup results ==
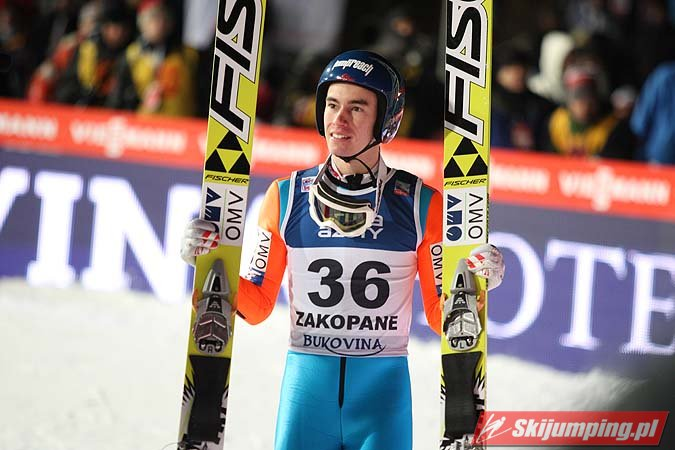
Kraft in Zakopane 2013.

=== Season titles ===
- 6 titles – (3 overall, 3 ski flying)

Season
Season	Discipline
2016–17	Overall
2016–17	Ski flying
2019–20	Overall
2019–20	Ski flying
2022–23	Ski flying
2023–24	Overall

=== Season standings ===
Season				Tour Standings			
Season	Overall	4H	SF	RA	W6	T5	P7
2011–12	—	67	—	N/A	N/A	N/A	N/A
2012–13	31	40	32	N/A	N/A	N/A	N/A
2013–14	10	27	29	N/A	N/A	N/A	N/A
2014–15	3rd place, bronze medalist(s)	1st place, gold medalist(s)	7	N/A	N/A	N/A	N/A
2015–16	6	5	7	N/A	N/A	N/A	N/A
2016–17	1st place, gold medalist(s)	6	1st place, gold medalist(s)	1st place, gold medalist(s)	N/A	N/A	N/A
2017–18	4	20	4	4	—	N/A	4
2018–19	2nd place, silver medalist(s)	17	8	2nd place, silver medalist(s)	7	N/A	12
2019–20	1st place, gold medalist(s)	5	1st place, gold medalist(s)	8	2nd place, silver medalist(s)	4	N/A
2020–21	17	8	22	N/A	15	N/A	17
2021–22	5	26	3rd place, bronze medalist(s)	1st place, gold medalist(s)	N/A	N/A	6
2022–23	2nd place, silver medalist(s)	6	1st place, gold medalist(s)	2nd place, silver medalist(s)	N/A	N/A	1st place, gold medalist(s)
2023–24	1st place, gold medalist(s)	3rd place, bronze medalist(s)	2nd place, silver medalist(s)	1st place, gold medalist(s)	N/A	N/A	4
2024–25	3rd place, bronze medalist(s)	3rd place, bronze medalist(s)	18	7	N/A	N/A	6
2025–26	10	11	17	N/A	N/A	N/A	9

=== Individual wins ===
No.	Season	Date	Location	Hill	Size
1	2014–15	29 December 2014	(Germany) Oberstdorf	Schattenbergschanze HS137	LH
2	2014–15	15 January 2015	(Poland) Wisła	Malinka HS134	LH
3	2014–15	8 March 2015	(Finland) Lahti	Salpausselkä HS130	LH
4	2015–16	24 January 2016	(Poland) Zakopane	Wielka Krokiew HS134	LH
5	2016–17	30 December 2016	(Germany) Oberstdorf	Schattenbergschanze HS137	LH
6	2016–17	4 February 2017	(Germany) Oberstdorf	Heini-Klopfer-Skiflugschanze HS225	FH
7	2016–17	5 February 2017	(Germany) Oberstdorf	Heini-Klopfer-Skiflugschanze HS225	FH
8	2016–17	15 February 2017	(South Korea) Pyeongchang	Alpensia Ski Jumping Centre HS140	LH
9	2016–17	12 March 2017	(Norway) Oslo	Holmenkollbakken HS134	LH
10	2016–17	16 March 2017	(Norway) Trondheim	Granåsen HS140	LH
11	2016–17	24 March 2017	(Slovenia) Planica	Letalnica bratov Gorišek HS225	FH
12	2016–17	26 March 2017	(Slovenia) Planica	Letalnica bratov Gorišek HS225	FH
13	2018–19	20 January 2019	(Poland) Zakopane	Wielka Krokiew HS140	LH
14	2018–19	26 January 2019	(Japan) Sapporo	Ōkurayama HS137	LH
15	2018–19	27 January 2019	(Japan) Sapporo	Ōkurayama HS137	LH
16	2018–19	12 March 2019	(Norway) Lillehammer	Lysgårdsbakken HS140	LH
17	2019–20	8 December 2019	(Russia) Nizhny Tagil	Tramplin Stork HS134	LH
18	2019–20	2 February 2020	(Japan) Sapporo	Ōkurayama HS137	LH
19	2019–20	16 February 2020	(Austria) Tauplitz	Kulm HS235	FH
20	2019–20	22 February 2020	(Romania) Râșnov	Râșnov Ski Jump HS97	NH
21	2019–20	28 February 2020	(Finland) Lahti	Salpausselkä HS130	LH
22	2021–22	11 December 2021	(Germany) Klingenthal	Vogtland Arena HS140	LH
23	2021–22	25 February 2022	(Finland) Lahti	Salpausselkä HS130	LH
24	2021–22	3 March 2022	(Norway) Lillehammer	Lysgårdsbakken HS140	LH
25	2021–22	19 March 2022	(Germany) Oberstdorf	Heini-Klopfer-Skiflugschanze HS235	FH
26	2022–23	27 November 2022	(Finland) Ruka (Note: Tied with Halvor Egner Granerud)	Rukatunturi HS142	LH
27	2022–23	21 January 2023	(Japan) Sapporo	Ōkurayama HS137	LH
28	2022–23	12 March 2023	(Norway) Oslo	Holmenkollbakken HS134	LH
29	2022–23	19 March 2023	(Norway) Vikersund	Vikersundbakken HS240	FH
30	2022–23	1 April 2023	(Slovenia) Planica	Letalnica bratov Gorišek HS240	FH
31	2023–24	25 November 2023	(Finland) Ruka	Rukatunturi HS142	LH
32	2023–24	26 November 2023	(Finland) Ruka	Rukatunturi HS142	LH
33	2023–24	2 December 2023	(Norway) Lillehammer	Lysgårdsbakken HS98	NH
34	2023–24	3 December 2023	(Norway) Lillehammer	Lysgårdsbakken HS140	LH
35	2023–24	17 December 2023	(Switzerland) Engelberg	Gross-Titlis HS140	LH
36	2023–24	6 January 2024	(Austria) Bischofshofen	Paul-Ausserleitner-Schanze HS142	LH
37	2023–24	21 January 2024	(Poland) Zakopane	Wielka Krokiew HS140	LH
38	2023–24	11 February 2024	(United States) Lake Placid	MacKenzie Intervale Complex HS128	LH
39	2023–24	17 February 2024	(Japan) Sapporo	Ōkurayama HS137	LH
40	2023–24	25 February 2024	(Germany) Oberstdorf	Heini-Klopfer-Skiflugschanze HS235	FH
41	2023–24	9 March 2024	(Norway) Oslo	Holmenkollbakken HS134	LH
42	2023–24	13 March 2024	(Norway) Trondheim	Granåsen HS138	NH
43	2023–24	17 March 2024	(Norway) Vikersund	Vikersundbakken HS240	FH
44	2024–25	29 December 2024	(Germany) Oberstdorf	Oberstdorf HS137	LH
45	2024–25	4 January 2025	(Austria) Innsbruck	Bergiselschanze HS128	LH
46	2025–26	25 November 2025	(Sweden) Falun	Lugnet HS95	NH

=== Individual starts ===
winner (1); second (2); third (3); did not compete (–); failed to qualify (q); disqualified (DQ)
Season	1	2	3	4	5	6	7	8	9	10	11	12	13	14	15	16	17	18	19	20	21	22	23	24	25	26	27	28	29	30	31	32	Points
2011–12	Kuusamo	Lillehammer	Lillehammer	Harrachov	Harrachov	Engelberg	Engelberg	Oberstdorf	Garmisch-Partenkirchen	Innsbruck	Bischofshofen	Bad Mitterndorf	Bad Mitterndorf	Zakopane	Zakopane	Sapporo	Sapporo	Predazzo	Predazzo	Willingen	Oberstdorf	Lahti	Trondheim	Oslo	Planica	Planica							0
2011–12	–	–	–	–	–	–	–	–	–	q	54	–	–	–	–	–	–	–	–	–	–	–	–	–	–	–							0
2012–13	Lillehammer	Lillehammer	Kuusamo	Krasnaja Polana	Krasnaja Polana	Engelberg	Engelberg	Oberstdorf	Garmisch-Partenkirchen	Innsbruck	Bischofshofen	Wisła	Zakopane	Sapporo	Sapporo	Vikersund	Vikersund	Harrachov	Harrachov	Klingenthal	Oberstdorf	Lahti	Kuopio	Trondheim	Oslo	Planica	Planica						202
2012–13	–	–	–	–	–	–	–	–	–	23	3	28	11	–	–	–	–	–	–	19	11	38	6	14	42	27	22						202
2013–14	Klingenthal	Kuusamo	Lillehammer	Lillehammer	Titisee-Neustadt	Titisee-Neustadt	Engelberg	Engelberg	Oberstdorf	Garmisch-Partenkirchen	Innsbruck	Bischofshofen	Tauplitz	Tauplitz	Wisła	Zakopane	Sapporo	Sapporo	Willingen	Willingen	Falun	Lahti	Lahti	Kuopio	Trondheim	Oslo	Planica	Planica					539
2013–14	14	dq	22	25	25	19	12	13	50	30	12	20	33	21	21	22	24	16	15	7	5	2	4	9	11	8	13	9					539
2014–15	Klingenthal	Kuusamo	Kuusamo	Lillehammer	Lillehammer	Nizhny Tagil	Nizhny Tagil	Engelberg	Engelberg	Oberstdorf	Garmisch-Partenkirchen	Innsbruck	Bischofshofen	Tauplitz	Wisła	Zakopane	Sapporo	Sapporo	Willingen	Willingen	Titisee-Neustadt	Titisee-Neustadt	Vikersund	Vikersund	Lahti	Kuopio	Trondheim	Oslo	Oslo	Planica	Planica		1578
2014–15	2	13	13	17	11	4	3	6	9	1	6	2	3	2	1	2	2	4	7	6	2	5	–	–	1	3	9	10	5	3	4		1578
2015–16	Klingenthal	Lillehammer	Lillehammer	Nizhny Tagil	Nizhny Tagil	Engelberg	Engelberg	Oberstdorf	Garmisch-Partenkirchen	Innsbruck	Bischofshofen	Willingen	Zakopane	Sapporo	Sapporo	Trondheim	Vikersund	Vikersund	Vikersund	Lahti	Lahti	Kuopio	Almaty	Almaty	Wisła	Titisee-Neustadt	Planica	Planica	Planica				1006
2015–16	6	4	14	22	27	7	8	7	9	11	4	4	1	–	–	2	5	6	2	11	8	3	11	4	21	22	10	12	10				1006
2016–17	Kuusamo	Kuusamo	Klingenthal	Lillehammer	Lillehammer	Engelberg	Engelberg	Oberstdorf	Garmisch-Partenkirchen	Innsbruck	Bischofshofen	Wisła	Wisła	Zakopane	Willingen	Oberstdorf	Oberstdorf	Sapporo	Sapporo	Pyeongchang	Pyeongchang	Oslo	Trondheim	Vikersund	Planica	Planica							1665
2016–17	9	4	3	3	8	6	3	1	3	18	25	2	4	–	2	1	1	3	3	1	2	1	1	5	1	1							1665
2017–18	Wisła	Kuusamo	Nizhny Tagil	Nizhny Tagil	Titisee-Neustadt	Engelberg	Engelberg	Oberstdorf	Garmisch-Partenkirchen	Innsbruck	Bischofshofen	Tauplitz	Zakopane	Willingen	Willingen	Lahti	Oslo	Lillehammer	Trondheim	Vikersund	Planica	Planica											881
2017–18	3	13	4	3	12	13	3	4	31	24	4	9	15	–	–	3	2	8	2	5	3	2											881
2018–19	Wisła	Kuusamo	Kuusamo	Nizhny Tagil	Nizhny Tagil	Engelberg	Engelberg	Oberstdorf	Garmisch-Partenkirchen	Innsbruck	Bischofshofen	Val di Fiemme	Val di Fiemme	Zakopane	Sapporo	Sapporo	Oberstdorf	Oberstdorf	Oberstdorf	Lahti	Willingen	Willingen	Oslo	Lillehammer	Trondheim	Vikersund	Planica	Planica					1349
2018–19	21	26	10	5	20	8	12	3	49	2	3	4	2	1	1	1	6	3	7	4	11	10	2	1	3	3	14	17					1349
2019–20	Wisła	Kuusamo	Nizhny Tagil	Nizhny Tagil	Klingenthal	Engelberg	Engelberg	Oberstdorf	Garmisch-Partenkirchen	Innsbruck	Bischofshofen	Val di Fiemme	Val di Fiemme	Titisee-Neustadt	Titisee-Neustadt	Zakopane	Sapporo	Sapporo	Willingen	Tauplitz	Tauplitz	Râșnov	Râșnov	Lahti	Lahti	Lillehammer	Lillehammer						1659
2019–20	21	4	7	1	2	2	18	4	13	4	4	2	2	2	11	2	2	1	4	3	1	3	1	1	2	8	17						1659
2020–21	Wisła	Ruka	Ruka	Nizhny Tagil	Nizhny Tagil	Engelberg	Engelberg	Oberstdorf	Garmisch-Partenkirchen	Innsbruck	Bischofshofen	Titisee-Neustadt	Titisee-Neustadt	Zakopane	Lahti	Willingen	Willingen	Klingenthal	Klingenthal	Szczyrk	Szczyrk	Râșnov	Planica	Planica	Planica								429
2020–21	32	–	–	–	–	–	–	6	28	8	4	9	3	–	5	23	6	19	16	10	5	–	23	29	17								429
2021–22	Nizhny Tagil	Nizhny Tagil	Ruka	Ruka	Wisła	Klingenthal	Klingenthal	Engelberg	Engelberg	Oberstdorf	Garmisch-Partenkirchen	Bischofshofen	Bischofshofen	Bischofshofen	Zakopane	Titisee-Neustadt	Titisee-Neustadt	Willingen	Willingen	Lahti	Lahti	Lillehammer	Oslo	Oslo	Oberstdorf	Oberstdorf	Planica	Planica					1069
2021–22	q	3	4	7	3	1	26	9	14	12	q	23	24	17	–	22	9	25	6	1	3	1	8	3	1	3	6	11					1069
2022–23	Wisła	Wisła	Ruka	Ruka	Titisee-Neustadt	Titisee-Neustadt	Engelberg	Engelberg	Oberstdorf	Garmisch-Partenkirchen	Innsbruck	Bischofshofen	Zakopane	Sapporo	Sapporo	Sapporo	Bad Mitterndorf	Bad Mitterndorf	Willingen	Willingen	Lake Placid, New York	Lake Placid, New York	Râșnov	Oslo	Oslo	Lillehammer	Lillehammer	Vikersund	Vikersund	Lahti	Planica	Planica	1790
2022–23	3	5	2	1	8	3	4	6	5	18	4	14	3	5	1	18	2	3	8	13	16	3	–	2	1	2	8	2	1	2	1	3	1790
2023–24	Ruka	Ruka	Lillehammer	Lillehammer	Klingenthal	Klingenthal	Engelberg	Engelberg	Oberstdorf	Garmisch-Partenkirchen	Innsbruck	Bischofshofen	Wisła	Zakopane	Willingen	Willingen	Lake Placid, New York	Lake Placid, New York	Sapporo	Sapporo	Oberstdorf	Oberstdorf	Lahti	Lahti	Oslo	Oslo	Trondheim	Trondheim	Vikersund	Vikersund	Planica	Planica	2149
2023–24	1	1	1	1	2	9	3	1	3	6	6	1	2	1	39	6	24	1	1	4	3	1	49	8	1	3	5	1	1	2	7	4	2149
2024–25	Lillehammer	Lillehammer	Ruka	Ruka	Wisła	Wisła	Titisee-Neustadt	Titisee-Neustadt	Engelberg	Engelberg	Oberstdorf	Garmisch-Partenkirchen	Innsbruck	Bischofshofen	Zakopane	Oberstdorf	Oberstdorf	Willingen	Willingen	Lake Placid	Lake Placid	Sapporo	Sapporo	Oslo	Vikersund	Vikersund	Lahti	Planica	Planica				1290
2024–25	4	4	3	2	7	3	11	9	14	3	1	8	1	3	7	29	7	12	4	9	14	6	5	10	6	4	2	5	12				1290
2025–26	Lillehammer	Lillehammer	Falun	Falun	Ruka	Wisła	Wisła	Klingenthal	Klingenthal	Engelberg	Engelberg	Oberstdorf	Garmisch-Partenkirchen	Innsbruck	Bischofshofen	Zakopane	Sapporo	Sapporo	Willingen	Willingen	Bad Mitterndorf	Bad Mitterndorf	Lahti	Lahti	Oslo	Oslo	Vikersund	Planica	Planica				631
2025–26	3	5	1	9	–	–	–	2	11	14	19	9	26	13	6	–	9	dq	14	29	16	29	21	q	23	19	16	14	6				631

=== Podiums ===
Season	Podiums			
Season	Medals			Total
Season	1st place, gold medalist(s)	2nd place, silver medalist(s)	3rd place, bronze medalist(s)	
2011–12	-	-	-	-
2012–13	-	-	1	1
2013–14	-	1	-	1
2014–15	3	6	4	13
2015–16	1	2	1	4
2016–17	8	3	6	17
2017–18	-	3	5	8
2018–19	4	3	5	12
2019–20	5	8	2	15
2020–21	-	-	1	1
2021–22	4	-	5	9
2022–23	5	6	6	17
2023–24	13	3	4	20
2024–25	2	2	4	8
2025–26	1	1	1	3
Total	46	38	45	129

== Ski jumping world record ==
Date	Hill	Location	Metres	Feet
18 March 2017	Vikersundbakken HS225	Vikersund, Norway	253.5	832

== Olympic results ==
Year
Year	Age	Normal hill	Large hill	Team/Super Team	Mixed Team
(South Korea) 2018 Pyeongchang	24	13	18	4	–
(China) 2022 Beijing	28	10	13	1	5
(Italy) 2026 Milano - Cortina	32	27	36	–	–

== World Championships ==
- 15 medals – (3 gold, 6 silver, 6 bronze)

Year
Year	Normal Hill	Large Hill	Team (men)	Team (mixed)
(Italy) 2013 Val di Fiemme	33	23	–	–
(Sweden) 2015 Falun	3	5	2	4
(Finland) 2017 Lahti	1	1	3	2
(Austria) 2019 Seefeld	3	6	2	2
(Germany) 2021 Oberstdorf	10	1	2	3
(Slovenia) 2023 Planica	4	6	3	4
(Norway) 2025 Trondheim	6	12	2	3

== Personal life ==
Kraft married his long-time girlfriend, Marisa Probst, in August 2022. In December 2025, they became parents to a daughter.
