= Jonas Sandell =

Swedish ski jumper (born 1995)

Personal information
- Full name: Jonas Sandell
- Born: 12 February 1995 (age 31)

Sport
- Sport: Skiing
- Club: Tromso Skiklub and IF Friska Viljor

World Cup career
- Seasons: -

Achievements and titles
- Personal best: 208m
Medal record
Men's ski jumping
Representing Sweden

Jonas Sandell (born 12 February 1995) is a Norwegian and Swedish ski jumper.

He represented Sweden at the FIS Nordic World Ski Championships 2015 in Falun. He competed in the individual hill, normal hill, large hill and the large hill team event, placing 13th in the latter. His best jump is 208 meters.

Throughout his career, he was associated with IF Friska Vijor (Sweden) and Tromsø Skiklubb (Norway).

As of early 2026, Sandell has transitioned into a FPV drone operator for professional sports broadcasting. In the 2026 Winter Olympics (Milano Cortina), he serves as lead drone pilot.
