= Ronan Lamy Chappuis =

French ski jumper (born 1993)

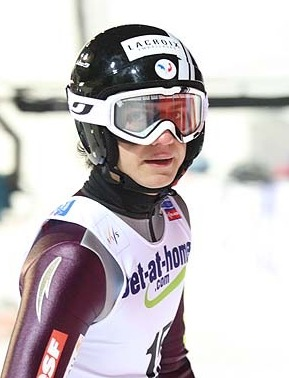

Personal information
- Born: 10 September 1993 (age 32) Lons-le-Saunier, France

Sport
- Sport: Skiing

Ronan Lamy Chappuis (born 10 September 1993 in Lons-le-Saunier) is a French ski jumper. He is a cousin of 2010 Olympic gold medalist Jason Lamy-Chappuis.

Lamy Chappuis competed at the 2014 Winter Olympics for France. He placed 33rd in the normal hill qualifying round, and 40th on the first jump of the final, failing to advance. He placed 28th in the large hill qualifying round, and 36th in the first jump of the final round, failing to advance.

As of September 2014, his best showing at the World Championships is 5th, in the 2013 team event. His best individual finish is 38th, in the 2013 normal hill event.

Lamy Chappuis made his World Cup debut in November 2012. As of September 2014, his best finish is 7th, in a team event at Lillehammer in 2013–14. His best individual finish is 11th, at a large hill event at Sapporo in 2013–14. His best World Cup overall finish is 60th, in 2013–14.
