= Carl Nordin =

Swedish ski jumper

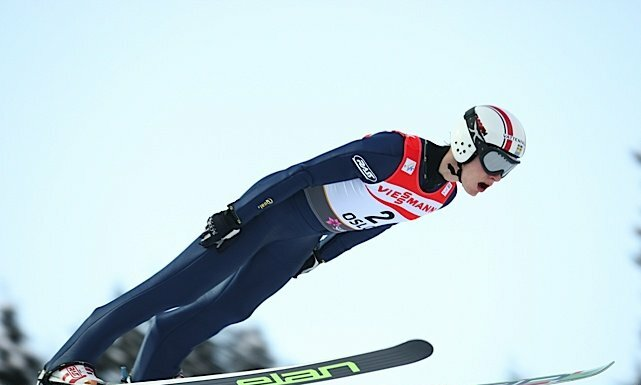
- Carl Nordin during practice at the World Championships in Oslo, Norway in February 2011

Personal information
- Born: 23 December 1989 (age 36)

Sport
- Sport: Skiing
- Club: IF Friska Viljor

World Cup career
- Seasons: 2008–2013
- Indiv. wins: 0
- Updated on 18 January 2010

Carl Nordin (born 23 December 1989 in Örnsköldsvik) is a Swedish ski jumper.

He made his Continental Cup debut in December 2004 in Rovaniemi, and his best results are two 24th places from Hinterzarten and Iron Mountain in February 2008. He participated in the FIS Junior World Ski Championships in 2006, 2007 and 2009. He made his World Cup debut in March 2008 in Planica, but only has one finish in an individual competition; in February 2009 in Klingenthal.

March 2011 in Sollefteå with the team gold and the silver medal in individual jumping behind title winner Fredrik Balkåsen. On 5 February 2012 he reached Örnsköldsvik for the fourth time in a row silver at the Swedish Championships in singles on the normal hill and gold with the team and the large hill. In 2013, he achieved his best placing at the World Championships with 44th place at the Nordic World Ski Championships in Val di Fiemme.

At the 2015 Swedish Championships, Nordin won silver in the individual competition on the normal hill and gold in the individual competition on the large hill.
