= Severin Freund =

German ski jumper

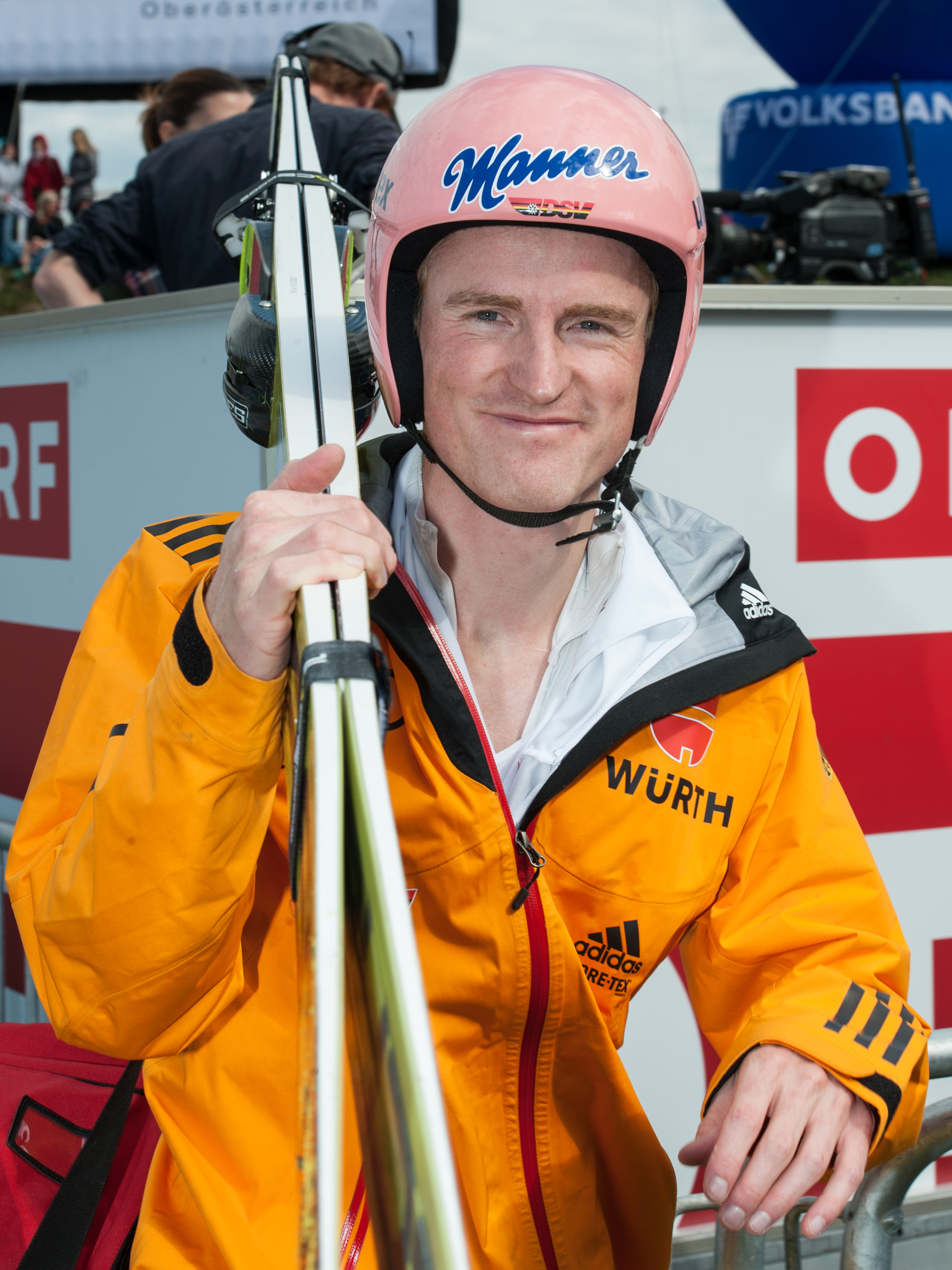
- Freund in Hinzenbach, 2015

Personal information
- Nationality: Germany
- Born: 11 May 1988 (age 38) Freyung, West Germany
- Height: 1.85 m (6 ft 1 in)

Sport
- Sport: Skiing
- Club: WSV DJK Rastbüchl

World Cup career
- Seasons: 2008–2017; 2019–2022
- Indiv. starts: 250
- Indiv. podiums: 53
- Indiv. wins: 22
- Team starts: 38
- Team podiums: 21
- Team wins: 6
- Overall titles: 1 (2015)

Achievements and titles
- Personal bests: 245 m (804 ft); Vikersund, 15 February 2015
Medal record
Representing Germany
Men's ski jumping
Olympic Games
Gold medal – first place	2014 Sochi	Team LH
Ski Jumping World Championships
Gold medal – first place	2015 Falun	Individual LH
Gold medal – first place	2015 Falun	Mixed team NH
Gold medal – first place	2021 Oberstdorf	Team LH
Silver medal – second place	2013 Val di Fiemme	Team LH
Silver medal – second place	2015 Falun	Individual NH
Bronze medal – third place	2011 Oslo	Team NH
Bronze medal – third place	2013 Val di Fiemme	Mixed team NH
Men's ski flying
FIS Ski Flying World Championships
Gold medal – first place	2014 Harrachov	Individual
Silver medal – second place	2012 Vikersund	Team
Silver medal – second place	2016 Bad Mitterndorf	Team
Silver medal – second place	2022 Vikersund	Team

Severin Freund (born 11 May 1988) is a German former ski jumper and current TV expert. He competed at World Cup level from 2008 to 2022, and is one of the most successful ski jumpers from Germany, having won the overall World Cup title in 2015, and scoring 22 individual World Cup wins. As a member of the German national team, Freund won a gold medal at the 2014 Winter Olympics and later became the 2015 World Champion on both the large hill and mixed team competitions.

== Career ==
Having made his Continental Cup debut in December 2004, his best result is the victory from Lillehammer in September 2008. He won a gold medal in the team competition at the 2008 Junior World Ski Championships. He made his World Cup debut in December 2007 in Engelberg, and his best result before the 2011 season was a 12th place from Sapporo in January 2010.

On 29 December 2010, he reached the 6th place of the first event of the Four Hills Tournament in Oberstdorf. On 15 January 2011, he achieved his first ever World Cup victory at the first competition at Sapporo. In the same season, he won his first world championship medal finishing third with the team in the Team normal hill competition in Oslo. He finished seventh in the 2011 World Cup season.

=== TV ===
Severin Freund has been a ski jumping expert for ZDF since February 2023.

== Record ==
=== FIS World Nordic Ski Championships results ===
Event	Normal hill	Large hill	Team LH	Mixed Team NH
(Norway) 2011 Oslo	7	12	4	3rd place, bronze medalist(s)
(Italy) 2013 Predazzo	4	9	2nd place, silver medalist(s)	3rd place, bronze medalist(s)
(Sweden) 2015 Falun	2nd place, silver medalist(s)	1st place, gold medalist(s)	5	1st place, gold medalist(s)
(Germany) 2021 Oberstdorf	–	22	1st place, gold medalist(s)	–

=== FIS Ski Flying World Championships ===
Event	Individual	Team
(Norway) 2012 Vikersund	4	2nd place, silver medalist(s)
(Czech Republic) 2014 Harrachov	1st place, gold medalist(s)	Cancelled
(Austria) 2016 Bad Mitterndorf	6	2nd place, silver medalist(s)
(Norway) 2022 Vikersund	12	2nd place, silver medalist(s)

== World Cup ==
=== Standings ===
Season	Overall	4H	SF	RA	W6	T5	P7	NT
2007/08	68	39	N/A	N/A	N/A	N/A	N/A	—
2008/09	48	57	—	N/A	N/A	N/A	N/A	—
2009/10	42	60	31	N/A	N/A	N/A	N/A	39
2010/11	7	12	15	N/A	N/A	N/A	N/A	N/A
2011/12	8	7	9	N/A	N/A	N/A	N/A	N/A
2012/13	4	13	12	N/A	N/A	N/A	N/A	N/A
2013/14	3rd place, bronze medalist(s)	16	5	N/A	N/A	N/A	N/A	N/A
2014/15	1st place, gold medalist(s)	8	2nd place, silver medalist(s)	N/A	N/A	N/A	N/A	N/A
2015/16	2nd place, silver medalist(s)	2nd place, silver medalist(s)	6	N/A	N/A	N/A	N/A	N/A
2016/17	21	35	—	—	N/A	N/A	N/A	N/A
2017/18	—	—	—	—	—	N/A	—	N/A
2018/19	57	—	—	—	—	—	N/A	N/A
2019/20	73	—	—	42	—	—	N/A	N/A
2020/21	29	27	32	N/A	32	N/A	24	N/A
2021/22	30	33	22	23	N/A	N/A	30	N/A

=== Wins ===
No.	Season	Date	Location	Hill	Size
1	2010/11	15 January 2011	(Japan) Sapporo	Ōkurayama HS134 (night)	LH
2	2010/11	30 January 2011	(Germany) Willingen	Mühlenkopfschanze HS145	LH
3	2012/13	24 November 2012	(Norway) Lillehammer	Lysgårdsbakken HS100 (night)	NH
4	2012/13	1 December 2012	(Finland) Kuusamo	Rukatunturi HS142 (night)	LH
5	2013/14	8 December 2013	(Norway) Lillehammer	Lysgårdsbakken HS138	LH
6	2013/14	26 February 2014	(Sweden) Falun	Lugnet HS134 (night)	LH
7	2013/14	28 February 2014	(Finland) Lahti	Salpausselkä HS130 (night)	LH
8	2013/14	9 March 2014	(Norway) Oslo	Holmenkollbakken HS134	LH
9	2013/14	21 March 2014	(Slovenia) Planica	Bloudkova velikanka HS139	LH
10	2014/15	14 December 2014	(Russia) Nizhny Tagil	Tramplin Stork HS134 (night)	LH
11	2014/15	10 January 2015	(Austria) Tauplitz/Bad Mitterndorf	Kulm HS225	FH
12	2014/15	1 February 2015	(Germany) Willingen	Mühlenkopfschanze HS145	LH
13	2014/15	7 February 2015	(Germany) Titisee-Neustadt	Hochfirstschanze HS142	LH
14	2014/15	15 February 2015	(Norway) Vikersund	Vikersundbakken HS225	FH
15	2014/15	10 March 2015	(Finland) Kuopio	Puijo HS100 (night)	NH
16	2014/15	12 March 2015	(Norway) Trondheim	Granåsen HS140 (night)	LH
17	2014/15	14 March 2015	(Norway) Oslo	Holmenkollbakken HS134 (night)	LH
18	2014/15	15 March 2015	(Norway) Oslo	Holmenkollbakken HS134	LH
19	2015/16	5 December 2015	(Norway) Lillehammer	Lysgårdsbakken HS100 (night)	NH
20	2015/16	13 December 2015	(Russia) Nizhny Tagil	Tramplin Stork HS134 (night)	LH
21	2015/16	29 December 2015	(Germany) Oberstdorf	Schattenbergschanze HS137 (night)	LH
22	2016/17	26 November 2016	(Finland) Kuusamo/Ruka	Rukatunturi HS142 (night)	LH

=== Individual starts (250) ===
Season	1	2	3	4	5	6	7	8	9	10	11	12	13	14	15	16	17	18	19	20	21	22	23	24	25	26	27	28	29	30	31	Points
2007/08	Kuusamo HS142	Trondheim HS131	Trondheim HS131	Villach HS98	Villach HS98	Engelberg HS137	Engelberg HS137	Oberstdorf HS137	Garmisch-Partenkirchen HS140	Bischofshofen HS140	Bischofshofen HS140	Predazzo HS134	Predazzo HS134	Harrachov HS205	Zakopane HS134	Zakopane HS134	Sapporo HS134	Sapporo HS134	Liberec HS134	Liberec HS134	Willingen HS145	Kuopio HS127	Kuopio HS127	Lillehammer HS138	Oslo HS128	Planica HS215	Planica HS215					12
2007/08	–	–	–	–	–	50	49	30	–	q	20	q	q	–	–	–	–	–	–	–	–	–	–	–	–	–	–					12
2008/09	Kuusamo HS142	Trondheim HS140	Trondheim HS140	Pragelato HS140	Pragelato HS140	Engelberg HS137	Engelberg HS137	Oberstdorf HS137	Garmisch-Partenkirchen HS140	Innsbruck HS130	Bischofshofen HS140	Tauplitz HS200	Tauplitz HS200	Zakopane HS134	Zakopane HS134	Whistler HS140	Whistler HS140	Sapporo HS134	Willingen HS145	Klingenthal HS140	Oberstdorf HS213	Lahti HS97	Kuopio HS127	Lillehammer HS138	Vikersund HS207	Planica HS215	Planica HS215					36
2008/09	26	42	44	38	29	47	42	38	q	–	–	–	–	42	18	28	39	–	24	25	36	–	–	–	–	–	–					36
2009/10	Kuusamo HS142	Lillehammer HS138	Lillehammer HS138	Engelberg HS137	Engelberg HS137	Engelberg HS137	Oberstdorf HS137	Garmisch-Partenkirchen HS140	Innsbruck HS130	Bischofshofen HS140	Tauplitz HS200	Tauplitz HS200	Sapporo HS134	Sapporo HS134	Zakopane HS134	Zakopane HS134	Oberstdorf HS213	Klingenthal HS140	Willingen HS145	Lahti HS130	Kuopio HS127	Lillehammer HS138	Oslo HS134									75
2009/10	–	–	–	–	–	–	–	47	–	–	–	–	31	12	26	21	23	27	19	39	17	36	q									75
2010/11	Kuusamo HS142	Kuopio HS127	Lillehammer HS138	Lillehammer HS138	Engelberg HS137	Engelberg HS137	Engelberg HS137	Oberstdorf HS137	Garmisch-Partenkirchen HS140	Innsbruck HS130	Bischofshofen HS140	Harrachov HS205	Harrachov HS205	Sapporo HS134	Sapporo HS134	Zakopane HS134	Zakopane HS134	Zakopane HS134	Willingen HS145	Klingenthal HS140	Oberstdorf HS213	Vikersund HS225	Vikersund HS225	Lahti HS130	Planica HS215	Planica HS215						769
2010/11	30	13	21	13	13	18	8	6	42	24	13	–	–	1	2	3	15	6	1	10	4	–	–	3	17	6						769
2011/12	Kuusamo HS142	Lillehammer HS100	Lillehammer HS138	Harrachov HS142	Harrachov HS142	Engelberg HS137	Engelberg HS137	Oberstdorf HS137	Garmisch-Partenkirchen HS140	Innsbruck HS130	Bischofshofen HS140	Tauplitz HS200	Tauplitz HS200	Zakopane HS134	Zakopane HS134	Sapporo HS134	Sapporo HS134	Predazzo HS134	Predazzo HS134	Willingen HS145	Oberstdorf HS213	Lahti HS97	Trondheim HS140	Oslo HS134	Planica HS215	Planica HS215						857
2011/12	6	28	2	10	3	5	16	4	7	21	30	12	9	10	5	27	36	2	5	9	10	38	9	2	7	6						857
2012/13	Lillehammer HS100	Lillehammer HS138	Kuusamo HS142	Krasnaja Polana HS106	Krasnaja Polana HS106	Engelberg HS137	Engelberg HS137	Oberstdorf HS137	Garmisch-Partenkirchen HS140	Innsbruck HS130	Bischofshofen HS140	Wisła HS134	Zakopane HS134	Sapporo HS134	Sapporo HS134	Vikersund HS225	Vikersund HS225	Harrachov HS205	Harrachov HS205	Klingenthal HS140	Oberstdorf HS213	Lahti HS130	Kuopio HS127	Trondheim HS140	Oslo HS134	Planica HS215	Planica HS215					923
2012/13	1	16	1	2	5	4	6	3	15	4	33	-	22	7	31	10	9	–	–	17	9	3	3	10	13	9	9					923
2013/14	Klingenthal HS140	Kuusamo HS142	Lillehammer HS100	Lillehammer HS138	Titisee-Neustadt HS142	Titisee-Neustadt HS142	Engelberg HS137	Engelberg HS137	Oberstdorf HS137	Garmisch-Partenkirchen HS140	Innsbruck HS130	Bischofshofen HS140	Tauplitz HS200	Tauplitz HS200	Wisła HS134	Zakopane HS134	Sapporo HS134	Sapporo HS134	Willingen HS145	Willingen HS145	Falun HS134	Lahti HS130	Lahti HS130	Kuopio HS127	Trondheim HS140	Oslo HS134	Planica HS139	Planica HS139				1303
2013/14	28	6	7	1	5	8	48	20	10	32	15	10	4	12	13	6	–	–	2	2	1	1	2	2	7	1	1	2				1303
2014/15	Klingenthal HS140	Kuusamo HS142	Kuusamo HS142	Lillehammer HS138	Lillehammer HS138	Niżny Tagił HS134	Niżny Tagił HS134	Engelberg HS137	Engelberg HS137	Oberstdorf HS137	Garmisch-Partenkirchen HS140	Innsbruck HS130	Bischofshofen HS140	Tauplitz HS225	Wisła HS134	Zakopane HS134	Sapporo HS134	Sapporo HS134	Willingen HS145	Willingen HS145	Titisee-Neustadt HS142	Titisee-Neustadt HS142	Vikersund HS225	Vikersund HS225	Lahti HS130	Kuopio HS100	Trondheim HS140	Oslo HS134	Oslo HS134	Planica HS225	Planica HS225	1729
2014/15	16	7	3	6	4	3	1	7	10	13	10	8	8	1	3	3	–	–	3	1	1	ds	4	1	2	1	1	1	1	4	7	1729
2015/16	Klingenthal HS140	Lillehammer HS100	Lillehammer HS100	Niżny Tagił HS134	Niżny Tagił HS134	Engelberg HS137	Engelberg HS137	Oberstdorf HS137	Garmisch-Partenkirchen HS140	Innsbruck HS130	Bischofshofen HS140	Willingen HS145	Zakopane HS134	Sapporo HS134	Sapporo HS134	Trondheim HS140	Vikersund HS225	Vikersund HS225	Vikersund HS225	Lahti HS130	Lahti HS100	Kuopio HS127	Ałmaty HS140	Ałmaty HS140	Wisła HS134	Titisee-Neustadt HS142	Planica HS225	Planica HS225	Planica HS225			1490
2015/16	3	1	5	1	12	8	6	1	3	2	2	3	–	10	4	10	10	5	4	3	5	8	3	2	6	5	4	6	7			1490
2016/17	Kuusamo	Kuusamo	Klingenthal	Lillehammer	Lillehammer	Engelberg	Engelberg	Oberstdorf	Garmisch-Partenkirchen	Innsbruck	Bischofshofen	Wisła	Wisła	Zakopane	Willingen	Oberstdorf	Oberstdorf	Sapporo	Sapporo	Pyeongchang	Pyeongchang	Oslo	Lillehammer	Trondheim	Vikersund	Planica	Planica					309
2016/17	2	1	11	11	26	10	9	20	21	–	–	–	–	–	–	–	–	–	–	–	–	–	–	–	–	–	–					309
2018/19	Wisła	Kuusamo	Kuusamo	Nizhny Tagil	Nizhny Tagil	Engelberg	Engelberg	Oberstdorf	Garmisch-Partenkirchen	Innsbruck	Bischofshofen	Val di Fiemme	Val di Fiemme	Zakopane	Sapporo	Sapporo	Oberstdorf	Oberstdorf	Oberstdorf	Lahti	Willingen	Willingen	Oslo	Lillehammer	Vikersund	Trondheim	Planica	Planica				12
2018/19	–	29	31	22	30	50	47	36	41	–	–	–	–	–	–	–	–	–	–	–	–	–	–	–	–	–	–	–				12
2019/20	Wisła	Kuusamo	Nizhny Tagil	Nizhny Tagil	Klingenthal	Engelberg	Engelberg	Oberstdorf	Garmisch-Partenkirchen	Innsbruck	Bischofshofen	Val di Fiemme	Val di Fiemme	Titisee-Neustadt	Titisee-Neustadt	Zakopane	Sapporo	Sapporo	Willingen	Tauplitz	Tauplitz	Râșnov	Râșnov	Lahti	Lahti	Oslo	Lillehammer					2
2019/20	–	–	–	–	–	–	–	–	–	–	–	–	–	–	–	–	–	–	–	–	–	32	29	46	45	43	38					2
2020/21	Wisła	Ruka	Ruka	Nizhny Tagil	Nizhny Tagil	Engelberg	Engelberg	Oberstdorf	Garmisch-Partenkirchen	Innsbruck	Bischofshofen	Titisee-Neustadt	Titisee-Neustadt	Zakopane	Lahti	Willingen	Willingen	Klingenthal	Klingenthal	Szczyrk	Szczyrk	Râșnov	Planica	Planica	Planica							160
2020/21	25	23	9	39	18	q	39	25	39	36	20	23	24	16	27	37	17	31	21	30	31	14	q	27	25							160
2021/22	Nizhny Tagil	Nizhny Tagil	Ruka	Ruka	Wisła	Klingenthal	Klingenthal	Engelberg	Engelberg	Oberstdorf	Garmisch-Partenkirchen	Bischofshofen	Bischofshofen	Bischofshofen	Zakopane	Titisee-Neustadt	Titisee-Neustadt	Willingen	Willingen	Lahti	Lahti	Lillehammer	Oslo	Oslo	Oberstdorf	Oberstdorf	Planica	Planica				211
2021/22	–	–	–	–	–	–	–	–	–	DQ	28	12	46	44	20	17	14	4	24	15	23	18	19	39	17	13	32	28				211
