= Lauri Asikainen =

Finnish Nordic combined athlete

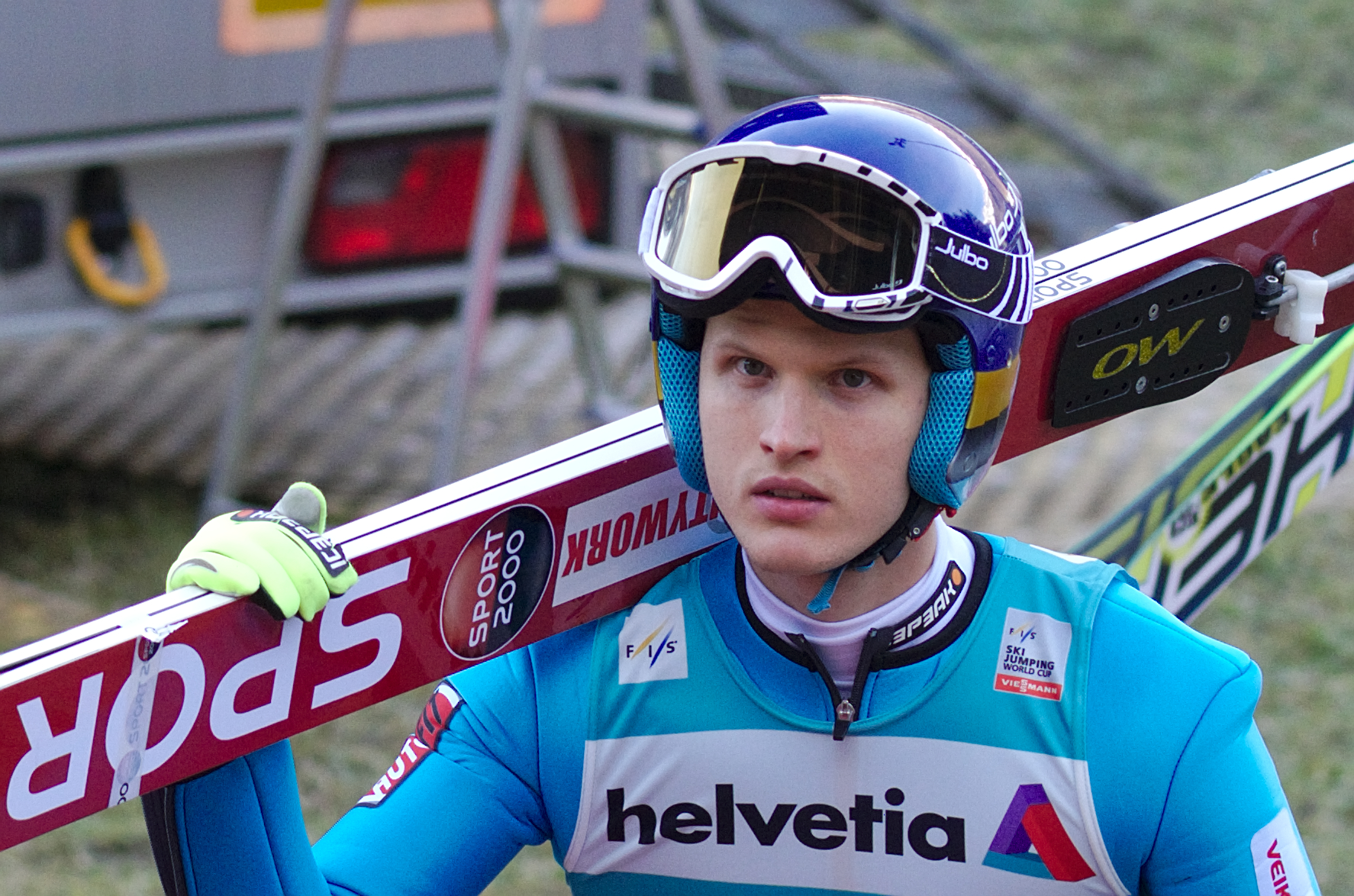
- Asikainen in 2014

Personal information
- Nationality: Finland
- Born: 28 May 1989 (age 37) Savonlinna, Finland
- Height: 1.72 m (5 ft 8 in)

Sport
- Sport: Skiing
- Club: Kuusamon Erae-Veikot

World Cup career
- Seasons: 2009–2010
- Indiv. starts: 24

Lauri Asikainen (born 28 May 1989) is a Finnish former Nordic combined athlete. He was born in Savonlinna, and made his senior Nordic combined debut in 2009, at the world championships in Liberec. He was previously a ski jumper, winning team bronze in 2007 at the World Junior Championships in Tarvisio. He is currently the hill coach for the Finland Nordic combined team.
