= FIS Nordic World Ski Championships 2015 =

2015 edition of the FIS Nordic World Ski Championships

- Official logo for the FIS Nordic World Ski Championships 2015.
- Host city: Falun, Sweden
- Nations: 60
- Events: 21
- Opening: 18 February 2015
- Closing: 1 March 2015
- Main venue: Lugnet
- Website: Falun2015.com

The FIS Nordic World Ski Championships 2015 took place between 18 February and 1 March 2015 in Falun, Sweden. This was the fourth time the event is held there, having previously been held there in 1954, 1974 and 1993. In 1980, one World Ski Championship race was held there as well, to make up for its exclusion from the Olympic Games the same year.

== Host selection ==
At the International Ski Federation (FIS) Council meeting in November 2007, a Candidates project concept was highlighted for use. Candidacy submission was 1 May 2009 along with the registration fee and training days in article 5 of the FIS World Championships Organization Rules. Each candidate and its National Ski Association will have instructions and a detailed questionnaire provided by the FIS that will be due on 1 September 2009. Candidates respond in a simple text format that will serve as the working document where an FIS Inspection Group will use for discussion purposes. Group members will meet with the candidate at mutually convenient opportunity to review the project area that falls under their responsibility. This should take place in conjunction with another event or World Cup inspection where possible to reduce costs and multiple trips. FIS Technical Committee members will have a working meeting in the fall of 2009 with each candidate and inspection group to review the project. A final report will be submitted in spring 2009 by the Inspection Group and the National Ski Association and FIS Council.

=== Finalists ===
The four finalists who submitted were those who lost out on the previous championships in 2008.

City	Country	Previous championships hosted	FIS Nordic World Ski Championships 2013 bid finish
Falun	Sweden	1954, 1974, 1993	2nd
Lahti	Finland	1926, 1938, 1958, 1978, 1989, 2001	4th
Oberstdorf	Germany	1987, 2005	5th
Zakopane	Poland	1929, 1939, 1962	3rd

=== Voting results ===
The winner was selected at the FIS Congress in Antalya, Turkey, on 3 June 2010.

City	First vote	Second vote	Final vote
Falun	6	7	8
Lahti	5	5	7
Zakopane	3	3	Out
Oberstdorf	1	Out	Out

== Schedule ==
All times are local (UTC+1).

Cross-country

Date	Time	Event
19 February	15:15	Men's & women's sprint
21 February	13:00	Women's 2x7.5 km skiathlon
21 February	14:30	Men's 2x15 km skiathlon
22 February	14:30	Men's & women's team sprint
24 February	13:30	Women's 10 km freestyle
25 February	13:30	Men's 15 km freestyle
26 February	13:30	Women's 4 x 5 km relay
27 February	13:30	Men's 4 x 10 km relay
28 February	13:00	Women's 30 km classic
1 March	13:30	Men's 50 km classic

Nordic combined

Date	Time	Event
20 February	10:00; 16:00	HS100 / 10 km
22 February	10:00; 16:00	Team HS100 / 4x5 km
26 February	10:00; 15:15	HS134 / 10 km
28 February	10:00; 15:15	Team sprint HS134 / 2x7.5 km

Ski jumping

Date	Time	Event
20 February	17:00	Women's HS100
21 February	16:30	Men's HS100
22 February	17:00	Team mix HS100
26 February	17:00	Men's HS134
28 February	17:00	Men's team HS134

== Medal summary ==
=== Medal table ===
* Host nation (Sweden)

Rank	Nation	Gold	Silver	Bronze	Total
1	Norway (NOR)	11	4	5	20
2	Germany (GER)	5	2	1	8
3	Sweden (SWE)*	2	4	3	9
4	France (FRA)	1	2	3	6
5	Austria (AUT)	1	2	2	5
6	Russia (RUS)	1	1	0	2
7	Canada (CAN)	0	1	1	2
7	Italy (ITA)	0	1	1	2
7	Japan (JPN)	0	1	1	2
7	United States (USA)	0	1	1	2
11	Czech Republic (CZE)	0	1	0	1
11	Switzerland (SUI)	0	1	0	1
13	Poland (POL)	0	0	2	2
14	Finland (FIN)	0	0	1	1
Totals (14 entries)		21	21	21	63

=== Cross-country skiing ===
==== Men ====
Event	Gold		Silver		Bronze	
15 kilometre freestyle	Johan Olsson; Sweden	35:01.6	Maurice Manificat; France	35:19.4	Anders Gløersen; Norway	35:20.8
30 kilometre skiathlon	Maxim Vylegzhanin; Russia	1:16:25.9	Dario Cologna; Switzerland	1:16:26.3	Alex Harvey; Canada	1:16:27.5
50 kilometre classical mass start	Petter Northug; Norway	2:26:02.1	Lukáš Bauer; Czech Republic	2:26:03.8	Johan Olsson; Sweden	2:26:04.1
4 × 10 kilometre relay	Norway; Niklas Dyrhaug; Didrik Tønseth; Anders Gløersen; Petter Northug	1:34:18.5	Sweden; Daniel Richardsson; Johan Olsson; Marcus Hellner; Calle Halfvarsson	1:34:19.1	France; Jean-Marc Gaillard; Maurice Manificat; Robin Duvillard; Adrien Backscheider	1:34:27.4
Sprint	Petter Northug; Norway	3:02.35	Alex Harvey; Canada	3:02.40	Ola Vigen Hattestad; Norway	3:02.70
Team sprint	Norway; Finn Hågen Krogh; Petter Northug	15:32.89	Russia; Alexei Petukhov; Nikita Kriukov	15:38.53	Italy; Dietmar Nöckler; Federico Pellegrino	15:38.62

==== Women ====
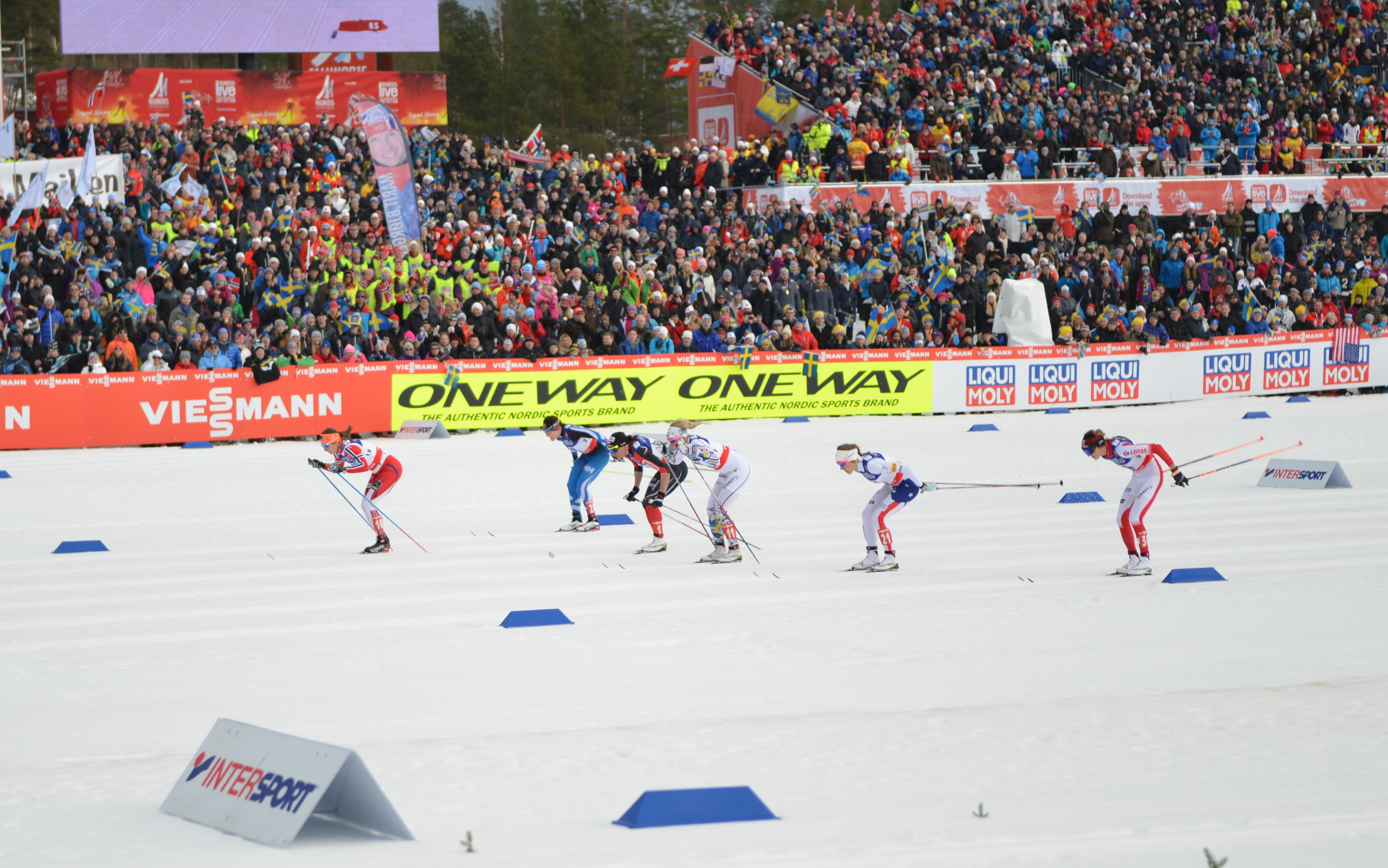
Women's sprint

Event	Gold		Silver		Bronze	
10 kilometre freestyle	Charlotte Kalla; Sweden	25:08.8	Jessie Diggins; United States	25:49.8	Caitlin Compton Gregg; United States	25:55.7
15 kilometre skiathlon	Therese Johaug; Norway	40:57.6	Astrid Uhrenholdt Jacobsen; Norway	41:03.3	Charlotte Kalla; Sweden	41:03.6
30 kilometre classical mass start	Therese Johaug; Norway	1:24:47.0	Marit Bjørgen; Norway	1:25:39.3	Charlotte Kalla; Sweden	1:26:18.6
4 × 5 kilometre relay	Norway; Heidi Weng; Therese Johaug; Astrid Uhrenholdt Jacobsen; Marit Bjørgen	49:04.7	Sweden; Sofia Bleckur; Charlotte Kalla; Maria Rydqvist; Stina Nilsson	49:33.9	Finland; Aino-Kaisa Saarinen; Kerttu Niskanen; Riitta-Liisa Roponen; Krista Pärmäkoski	49:35.6
Sprint	Marit Bjørgen; Norway	3:26.63	Stina Nilsson; Sweden	3:27.05	Maiken Caspersen Falla; Norway	3:27.62
Team sprint	Norway; Ingvild Flugstad Østberg; Maiken Caspersen Falla	14:29.57	Sweden; Ida Ingemarsdotter; Stina Nilsson	14:37.74	Poland; Justyna Kowalczyk; Sylwia Jaśkowiec	14:38.05

=== Nordic combined ===
Event	Gold		Silver		Bronze	
Individual large hill/10 km	Bernhard Gruber; Austria	22:45.8	François Braud; France	22:57.7	Johannes Rydzek; Germany	23:00.7
Individual normal hill/10 km	Johannes Rydzek; Germany	26:38.9	Alessandro Pittin; Italy	26:40.2	Jason Lamy-Chappuis; France	26:43.9
Team normal hill/4 × 5 km	Germany; Tino Edelmann; Eric Frenzel; Fabian Rießle; Johannes Rydzek	44:20.7	Norway; Magnus Moan; Håvard Klemetsen; Mikko Kokslien; Jørgen Graabak	44:43.8	France; François Braud; Maxime Laheurte; Sébastien Lacroix; Jason Lamy-Chappuis	45:00.3
Team sprint large hill/2 × 7,5 km	France; François Braud; Jason Lamy-Chappuis	38:31.6	Germany; Eric Frenzel; Johannes Rydzek	38:34.3	Norway; Magnus Moan; Håvard Klemetsen	38:51.0

=== Ski jumping ===
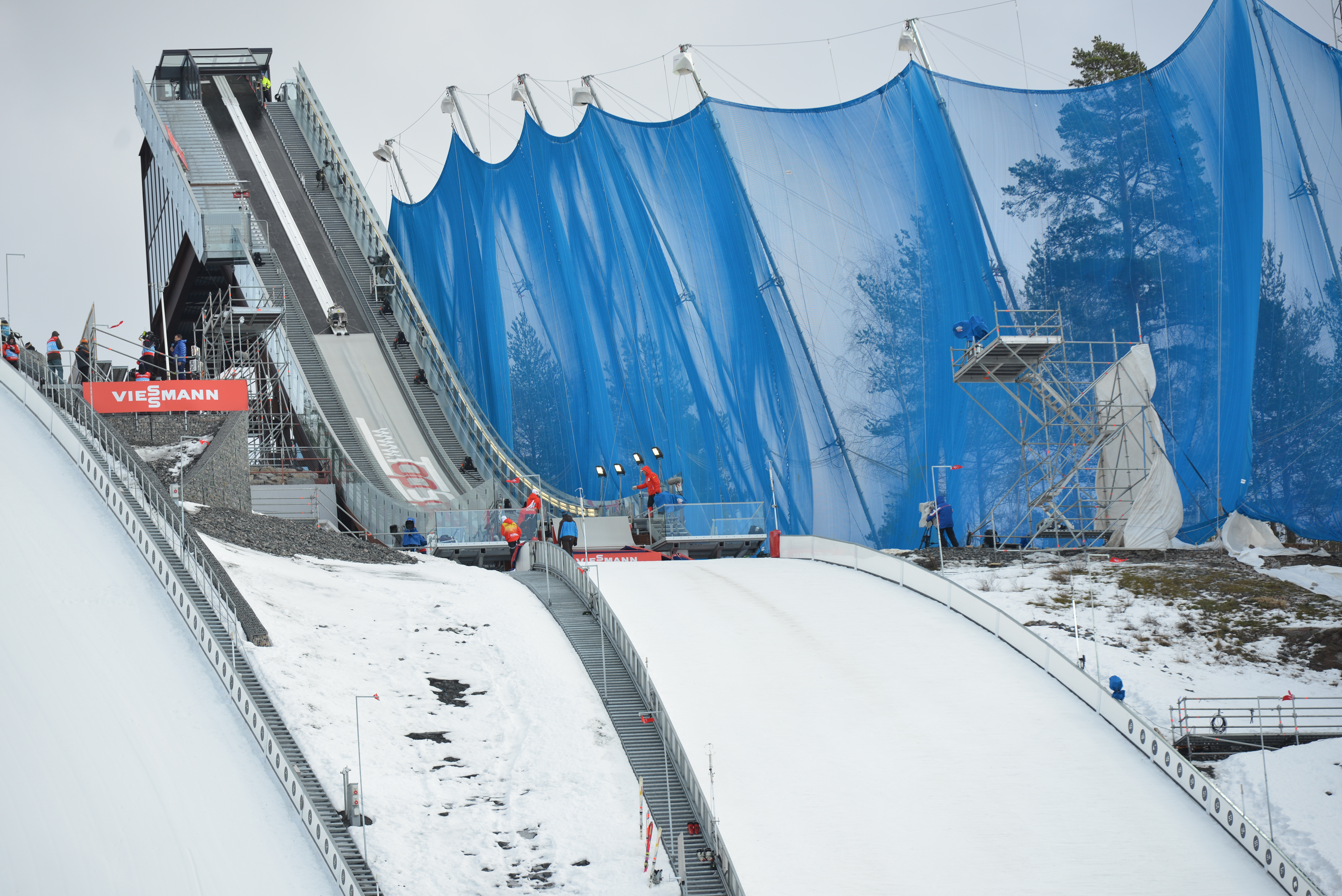
The normal ski jumping hill used in the championships.

==== Men ====
Event	Gold		Silver		Bronze	
Men's individual normal hill	Rune Velta; Norway	252.7	Severin Freund; Germany	252.3	Stefan Kraft; Austria	248.3
Men's individual large hill	Severin Freund; Germany	268.7	Gregor Schlierenzauer; Austria	246.4	Rune Velta; Norway	242.9
Men's team large hill	Norway; Anders Bardal; Anders Jacobsen; Anders Fannemel; Rune Velta	872.6	Austria; Stefan Kraft; Michael Hayböck; Manuel Poppinger; Gregor Schlierenzauer	853.2	Poland; Piotr Żyła; Klemens Murańka; Jan Ziobro; Kamil Stoch	848.1

==== Women ====
Event	Gold		Silver		Bronze	
Women's individual normal hill	Carina Vogt; Germany	236.9	Yuki Ito; Japan	235.1	Daniela Iraschko-Stolz; Austria	233.8

==== Mixed ====
Event	Gold		Silver		Bronze	
Mixed team normal hill	Germany; Carina Vogt; Richard Freitag; Katharina Althaus; Severin Freund	917.9	Norway; Line Jahr; Anders Bardal; Maren Lundby; Rune Velta	915.6	Japan; Sara Takanashi; Noriaki Kasai; Yuki Ito; Taku Takeuchi	888.3
