= List of Estonian ski jumping champions =

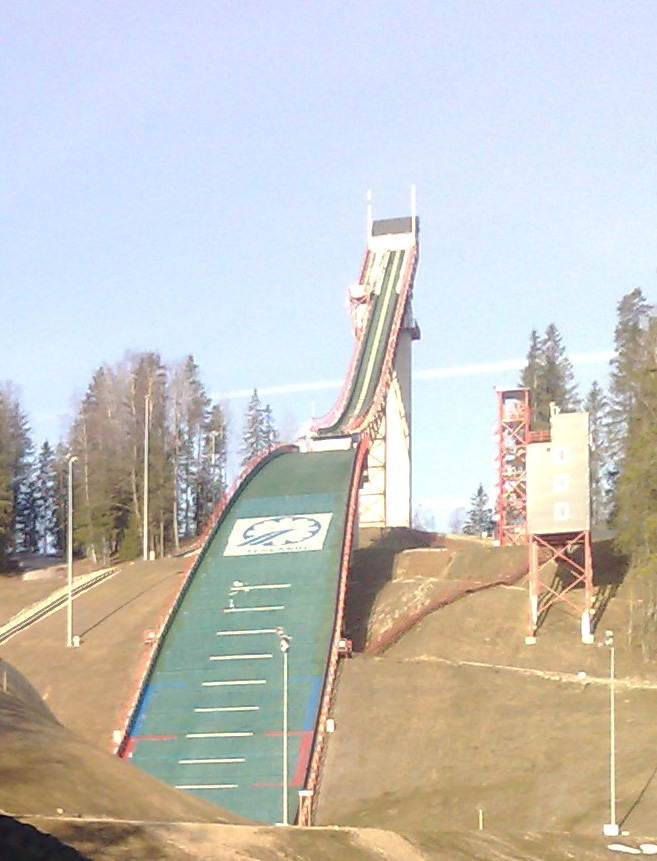
Tehvandi K90/HS100 ski jumping hill in Otepää, currently being used for the national championships

This is a list of Estonian ski jumping champions, as well as silver and bronze medalists, starting from the first championship held in 1933. There are presented also all medalists of the Estonian summer ski jumping championships.

== Men ==
=== Winter ===
Year	Place	Gold	Silver	Bronze
1933	Viljandi	Oskar Veldeman	Heino Otto	H. Polikarpus
1935	Tallinn	Otto Tamm	Heino Otto	Sergei Šumeiko
1936	Viljandi	Oskar Veldeman	Eduard Raidla	Aleksander Peekaln; Heino Otto
1937	Tallinn	Oskar Veldeman	Sergei Šumeiko	Aleksander Peepre
1938	Tallinn	Eduard Bergman-Raidla	Oskar Veldeman	Aleksei Pohlman
1940	Tallinn	Oskar Veldeman	Aleksander Peepre	Eduard Bergman-Raidla
1941	Tallinn	Harry Rannala	Aleksander Peepre	Ado Arvo
1946	Viljandi	Raimond Ranna	Karl Vesterstein	Erich Kulla
1950	Võru	Ilmar Pärtelpoeg	Aarne Tarkiainen	Endel Kull
1951	Võru	Uno Kajak	Johannes Peets	Enrico-Egon Mitt
1952	Tallinn	Ilmar Pärtelpoeg	Jüri Teras	Ants Aavola
1953	Võru	Uno Kajak	Uno Aavola	Ilmar Pärtelpoeg
1954	Otepää	Ilmar Pärtelpoeg	Uno Kajak	Hugo Kaselaan
1955	Otepää	Uno Kajak	Lembit Tiganik	Uno Aavola
1956	Otepää	Lembit Tiganik	Uno Aavola	Rein Kõiv
1957	Otepää	Boriss Stõrankevitš	Valev Aluvee	Vello Laev
1958	Võru	Valev Aluvee	Lembit Tiganik	Uno Kajak
1959	Otepää	Rein Kõiv	Raimond Mürk	Uno Kajak
1960	Võru	Vello Laev	Ants Kõiv	Ants Allandi
1961	Kavgolovo	Uno Kajak	Dieter Treumann	Valev Aluvee
1962	Otepää	Boriss Stõrankevitš	Valev Aluvee	Rein Kõiv
1963	Otepää	Rein Kõiv	Dieter Treumann	Enn Uhkai
1964	Otepää	Ants Allandi	Toivo Laev	Enn Uhkai
1965	Otepää	Rein Kõiv	Tõnu Haljand	Enn Uhkai
1966	Võru	Tõnu Haljand	Ants Allandi	Enn Uhkai
1967	Kavgolovo	Toivo Laev	Harry Arv	Ants Allandi
1968	Otepää	Toivo Laev	Tõnu Haljand	Harry Arv
1969	Otepää	Toivo Laev	Ants Allandi	Arvi Sopp
1970	Otepää	Toivo Laev	Silver Eljand	Ants Allandi
1971	Otepää	Harry Arv	Tiit Tamm	Silver Eljand
1972	Otepää	Harry Arv	Silver Eljand	Toivo Laev
1973	Otepää	Tõnu Haljand	Tiit Tamm	Silver Eljand
1974	Otepää	Joe Tikenberg	Silver Eljand	Heiki Leemet
1975	Otepää	Tiit Tamm	Harry Arv	Silver Eljand
1976	Otepää	Silver Eljand	Tiit Talvar	Vladimir Golubev
1977	Otepää	Vladimir Golubev	Tiit Tamm	Ants Lind
1978	Otepää	Kalev Aigro	Vladimir Golubev	Hillar Hein
1979	Otepää	Tiit Tamm	Vladimir Golubev	Hillar Hein
1980	Otepää	Margus Kangur	Hillar Hein	Ants Lind
1981	Otepää	Fjodor Koltšin	Tiit Heinloo	Margus Kangur
1982	Otepää	Priit Teder	Margus Kangur	Tiit Heinloo
1983	Otepää	Margus Kangur	Tiit Heinloo	Anatoli Viktorov
1984	Otepää	Allar Levandi	Anatoli Viktorov	Margus Kangur
1985	Otepää	Margus Kangur	Kair Tammel	Taivo Tigane
1986	Otepää	Jaan Vene	Priit Teder	Kalev Aigro
1987	Otepää	Peep Heinloo	Taivo Tigane	Priit Teder
1988	Otepää	Medni Tammsaar	Janno Perv	Priit Teder
1991	Otepää	Jüri Reesel	Toomas Tiru	Janno Perv
1992	Otepää	Kalmer Johanson	Janno Perv	Medni Tammsaar
1993	Otepää	Allar Levandi	Ago Markvardt	Egon Ilves
1994	Otepää	Ago Markvardt	Allar Levandi	Magnar Freimuth
1995	Otepää	Egon Kärema	Ago Markvardt	Magnar Freimuth
1996	Otepää	Ago Markvardt	Jaan Jüris	Ilmar Aluvee
1997	Otepää	Jaan Jüris	Tambet Pikkor	Ago Markvardt
1998	Otepää	Jens Salumäe	Magnar Freimuth	Jaan Jüris
1999	Otepää	Jaan Jüris	Tiit Orlovski	Urho Märdimäe
2000	Otepää	Tambet Pikkor	Jens Salumäe	Jaan Jüris
2001	Otepää	Jaan Jüris	Tambet Pikkor	Jens Salumäe
2002	Otepää	Jens Salumäe	Jaan Jüris	Vahur Tasane
2003	Otepää	Jens Salumäe	Jaan Jüris	Illimar Pärn
2004	Otepää	Jens Salumäe	Jaan Jüris	Kristjan Eljand
2005	Otepää	Jens Salumäe	Jaan Jüris	Tambet Pikkor
2006	Otepää	Jaan Jüris	Illimar Pärn	Mats Piho
2007	Otepää	Jaan Jüris	Mats Piho	Kristjan Eljand
2008	Otepää	No championships held in men's category.		
2009	Otepää	Illimar Pärn	Karl-August Tiirmaa	Tõnis Kartau
2010	Otepää	Kristjan Ilves	Aldo Leetoja	Siim-Tanel Sammelselg
2011	Otepää	Kaarel Nurmsalu	Kristjan Ilves	Martti Nõmme
2012	Otepää	Kaarel Nurmsalu	Illimar Pärn; Siim-Tanel Sammelselg	
2013	Otepää	Kristjan Ilves	Martti Nõmme	Han Hendrik Piho
2014	Otepää	No championships held in men's category.		
2015	Otepää	Kristjan Ilves	Tanel Levkoi	Karl-August Tiirmaa
2016	Otepää	Kaarel Nurmsalu	Martti Nõmme	Kevin Maltsev
2017	Otepää	Artti Aigro	Kristjan Ilves	Martti Nõmme
2018	Otepää	Artti Aigro	Kevin Maltsev	Martti Nõmme
2019	Otepää	Kevin Maltsev	Martti Nõmme	Kristjan Ilves
2020	Otepää	No championships held in men's category.		
2021	Otepää	Artti Aigro	Kevin Maltsev	Kristjan Ilves
2022	Otepää	Markkus Alter	Kaarel Nurmsalu	Martti Nõmme
2023	Otepää	Martti Nõmme	Kaimar Vagul	Artti Aigro
2024	Otepää	Kaimar Vagul	Andero Kapp	Kevin Maltsev

=== Summer ===
Year	Place	Gold	Silver	Bronze
1964	Tallinn	Enn Uhkai	Uno Kajak	Vello Kuus
1965	Tallinn	Enn Uhkai	Vello Kuus	Tõnu Haljand
1966	Tallinn	Tõnu Haljand	Enn Uhkai	Ants Allandi
1967	Tallinn	Toivo Laev	Vello Kuus	Harry Arv
1970	Tallinn	Harry Arv	Toivo Laev	Tõnu Haljand
1971	Tallinn	Heiki Leemet	Tõnu Haljand	Toivo Laev
1972	Tallinn	Silver Eljand	Heiki Leemet	Tõnu Haljand
1973	Otepää	Joe Tikenberg	Paul Männik	Tõnu Haljand
1974	Tallinn	Vladimir Golubev	Harry Arv	Silver Eljand
1980	Otepää	Margus Kangur	Priit Teder	Avo Tomingas
1981	Otepää	Margus Kangur	Tiit Heinloo	Priit Teder
1983	Otepää	Margus Kangur	Anatoli Viktorov	Kalev Aigro
1984	Otepää	Margus Kangur	Anatoli Viktorov	Peep Heinloo
1985	Otepää	Margus Kangur	Taivo Tigane	Kair Tammel
1986	Otepää	Ago Markvardt	Priit Teder	Taivo Tigane
1987	Otepää	Peep Heinloo	Janno Perv	Kalev Aigro
1988	Otepää	Peep Heinloo	Andrus Ilves	Toomas Tiru
1989	Otepää	Peep Heinloo	Medni Tammsaar	Toomas Tiru
1990	Otepää	Medni Tammsaar	Janno Perv	Toomas Tiru
1991	Tallinn	Toomas Tiru	Allar Levandi	Ago Markvardt
1992	Tallinn	Toomas Tiru	Peter Heli	Egon Ilves
1993	Tallinn	Egon Ilves	Ilmar Aluvee	Veiko Hõrak
1994	Tallinn	Magnar Freimuth	Egon Kärema	Veiko Hõrak
1995	Otepää	Magnar Freimuth	Ago Markvardt	Egon Kärema
1996	Otepää	Ago Markvardt	Magnar Freimuth	Roomet Pikkor
1997	Otepää	Magnar Freimuth	Jaan Jüris	Ago Markvardt
1998	Otepää	Jaan Jüris	Magnar Freimuth	Tambet Pikkor
1999	Otepää	Jens Salumäe	Jaan Jüris	Villu Teder
2000	Otepää	Jens Salumäe	Jaan Jüris	Rauno Pikkor
2001	Otepää	Jaan Jüris	Jens Salumäe	Tambet Pikkor
2002	Otepää	Jaan Jüris	Jens Salumäe	Tambet Pikkor
2003	Otepää	Jens Salumäe	Jaan Jüris	Vahur Tasane
2004	Otepää	Jens Salumäe	Jaan Jüris	Tambet Pikkor
2005	Otepää	Jaan Jüris	Kristjan Eljand	Illimar Pärn
2006	Otepää	Jens Salumäe	Jaan Jüris	Illimar Pärn
2008	Otepää	Illimar Pärn	Mats Piho	Tanel Levkoi
2009	Otepää	Illimar Pärn	Kaarel Nurmsalu	Aldo Leetoja
2010	Otepää	Kaarel Nurmsalu	Illimar Pärn	Martti Nõmme
2011	Otepää	Kaarel Nurmsalu	Siim-Tanel Sammelselg	Illimar Pärn
2012	Otepää	Kaarel Nurmsalu	Artti Aigro	Illimar Pärn
2013	Otepää	Kaarel Nurmsalu	Kristjan Ilves	Martti Nõmme
2014	Otepää	Kristjan Ilves	Martti Nõmme	Karl-August Tiirmaa
2015	Otepää	Martti Nõmme	Kristjan Ilves	Rauno Loit
2016	Otepää	Kristjan Ilves	Karl-August Tiirmaa	Martti Nõmme
2017	Otepää	Artti Aigro	Kristjan Ilves	Martti Nõmme
2018	Otepää	Kevin Maltsev	Kristjan Ilves	Ivo-Niklas Hermanson
2019	Otepää	Martti Nõmme	Artti Aigro	Robert Lee
2020	Otepää	Martti Nõmme	Markus Kägu	Andreas Ilves
2021	Otepää	Kristjan Ilves	Kevin Maltsev	Martti Nõmme
2022	Otepää	Artti Aigro	Kevin Maltsev	Martti Nõmme
2023	Otepää	Artti Aigro	Martti Nõmme	Kevin Maltsev
2024	Otepää	Artti Aigro	Martti Nõmme	Anderro Kapp

== Men's Team ==
The men's team ski hill jumping appeared from 1980 at irregular intervals, the championship became regular only from year 2003.

=== Winter ===
Year	Place	Gold	Silver	Bronze
1980	Otepää	Tallinna Kalev; Ants Lind; Margus Kangur; Juhan Lind	Tallinna Dünamo; Tiit Heinloo; Hillar Hein; Peep Heinloo	Otepää Dünamo; Kalev Aigro; Avo Tomingas; Priit Teder
1981	Otepää	Tallinna I Hillar Hein; Tiit Heinloo; Margus Kangur	Valga raj I Kalev Aigro; Priit Teder; Avo Tomingas	Tallinna II; Allar Levandi; Mihkel Mürk; Anatoli Viktorov
1985	Otepää	Tallinna I Tiit Heinloo; Anatoli Viktorov; Kair Tammel; Margus Kangur	Tallinna II; Mati Laiv; Karl Spiegel; Mairo Ehman; Andro Treumann	Tartu raj I Andres Aavik; Andrus Ilves; Olev Madi; Rain Pärn
1987	Otepää	Võru LNSK; Kalmer Johanson; Urmas Johanson; Jaan Vene; Andrus Ilves	Tallinna Dünamo I	Otepää Noor dünamolane III
1988	Otepää	Võru Dünamo; Urmas Johanson; Jüri Reesel; Medni Tammsaar	Tartu raj I Janno Perv; Alo Raudik; Rain Pärn	Tallinna Dünamo I Ilmar Aluvee; Tarmo Vooglaid; Peep Heinloo
2003	Otepää	Otepää SK; Kristjan Eljand; Egert Malts; Jaan Jüris	SuK Telemark; Aldo Leetoja; Vaiko Leetoja; Jouko Hein	Elva SuK; Janno Liivak; Tiit Orlovski; Illimar Pärn
2004	Otepää	Otepää SK; Priidik Vesi; Kristjan Eljand; Egert Malts	SuK Telemark; Aldo Leetoja; Jouko Hein; Vaiko Leetoja	Võru SpK; Elar Asuküll; Urho Märdimäe; Alar Asuküll
2005	Otepää	Otepää SK I Alar Kukka; Kristjan Eljand; Egert Malts	Elva SuK; Tiit Orlovski; Tõnis Kartau; Illimar Pärn	Otepää SK II; Ilmar Tedremaa; Karl-August Tiirmaa; Priidik Vesi
2006	Otepää	Otepää SK I Kristjan Eljand; Tambet Pikkor; Jaan Jüris	Nõmme SK; Kristjan Ehman; Tanel Levkoi; Raiko Heide	Otepää SK II; Alar Kukka; Egert Malts; Heiko Heitur
2009	Otepää	Otepää SK I Egert Malts; Karl-August Tiirmaa; Jaan Jüris	SÜ Taevatäht; Kaarel Piho; Kail Piho; Mats Piho	Elva SuK I Kristjan Ilves; Tõnis Kartau; Illimar Pärn
2010	Otepää	Nõmme SK I Raiko Heide; Siim-Tanel Sammelselg; Tanel Levkoi	Otepää SK; Jaan Jüris; Alar Kukka; Karl-August Tiirmaa	Elva SuK; Tõnis Kartau; Kristjan Ilves; Illimar Pärn
2011	Otepää	Otepää SK; Alar Kukka; Jaan Jüris; Karl-August Tiirmaa	Elva SuK; Tõnis Kartau; Kristjan Ilves; Illimar Pärn	SÜ Taevatäht; Han Hendrik Piho; Kail Piho; Mats Piho
2012	Otepää	Elva SuK I Karl Mustjõgi; Kristjan Ilves; Illimar Pärn	SÜ Taevatäht; Kaarel Piho; Kail Piho; Han Hendrik Piho	Otepää SK I Artti Aigro; Mihkel Oja; Karl-August Tiirmaa
2013	Otepää	Otepää SK; Artti Aigro; Mihkel Oja; Karl-August Tiirmaa	SÜ Taevatäht; Mats Piho; Kail Piho; Han Hendrik Piho	Elva SuK I Karl Mustjõgi; Rauno Loit; Kristjan Ilves

=== Summer ===
Year	Place	Gold	Silver	Bronze
2000	Otepää	Nõmme SK I Vahur Tasane; Priit Estermaa; Jens Salumäe	Nõmme SK III; Roomet Pikkor; Rauno Pikkor; Tambet Pikkor	Otepää SK I Lauri Koort; Villu Teder; Jaan Jüris
2001	Otepää	Nõmme SK II; Roomet Pikkor; Tambet Pikkor; Rauno Pikkor	Nõmme SK I Priit Estermaa; Vahur Tasane; Jens Salumäe	Otepää SK II; Kristjan Eljand; Egert Malts; Priidik Vesi
2002	Otepää	Audentese SpK; Kristjan Eljand; Egert Malts; Villu Teder	Elva SuK; Janno Liivak; Tiit Orlovski; Illimar Pärn	SK Spordimaailm; Roomet Pikkor; Rauno Pikkor; Tambet Pikkor
2003	Otepää	Nõmme SK; Kristjan Ehman; Veiko Lind; Vahur Tasane	SuK Telemark; Aldo Leetoja; Vaiko Leetoja; Jouko Hein	Audentese SpK; Karl-August Tiirmaa; Alar Kukka; Egert Malts
2004	Otepää	Otepää SK I Kristjan Eljand; Egert Malts; Jaan Jüris	Nõmme SK; Kristjan Ehman; Vahur Tasane; Jens Salumäe	Otepää SK II; Karl-August Tiirmaa; Priidik Vesi; Alar Kukka
2005	Otepää	Otepää SK I Egert Malts; Kristjan Eljand; Jaan Jüris	Otepää SK II; Karl-August Tiirmaa; Priidik Vesi; Tambet Pikkor	Võru SpK I Henri Kirbits; Elar Asuküll; Alar Asuküll
2006	Otepää	Otepää SK I Alar Kukka; Kristjan Eljand; Jaan Jüris	Võru SpK I Elar Asuküll; Henri Kirbits; Alar Asuküll	Otepää SK II; Priidik Vesi; Ilmar Tedremaa; Egert Malts
2008	Otepää	No championships held in men's category.		
2009	Otepää	Otepää SK; Alar Kukka; Jaan Jüris; Karl-August Tiirmaa	Elva SuK; Kristjan Ilves; Tõnis Kartau; Illimar Pärn	SÜ Taevatäht; Kail Piho; Han Hendrik Piho; Mats Piho
2010	Otepää	No championships held in men's category.		
2011	Otepää	Otepää SK I Artti Aigro; Jaan Jüris; Karl-August Tiirmaa	Elva SuK I Rauno Loit; Illimar Pärn; Kristjan Ilves	SÜ Taevatäht; Mats Piho; Han Hendrik Piho; Kail Piho
2012	Otepää	Otepää SK I Artti Aigro; Mihkel Oja; Karl-August Tiirmaa	SÜ Taevatäht; Mats Piho; Han Hendrik Piho; Kail Piho	Elva SuK I Karl Mustjõgi; Rauno Loit; Kristjan Ilves
2013	Otepää	Elva SuK I Rauno Loit; Illimar Pärn; Kristjan Ilves	SÜ Taevatäht; Kail Piho; Mats Piho; Han Hendrik Piho	Otepää SK I Artti Aigro; Kenno Ruukel; Karl-August Tiirmaa
2014	Otepää	Otepää SK I Artti Aigro; Mihkel Oja; Karl-August Tiirmaa	Elva SuK; Risto Raudberg; Rauno Loit; Kristjan Ilves	Nõmme SK; Raiko Heide; Tanel Levkoi; Siim-Tanel Sammelselg
2015	Otepää	Elva SuK I Risto Raudberg; Rauno Loit; Kristjan Ilves	Põhjakotkas I Markkus Alter; Artti Aigro; Kenno Ruukel	SÜ Taevatäht; Kail Piho; Mats Piho; Han Hendrik Piho
2016	Otepää	Põhjakotkas I Kenno Ruukel; Karl-August Tiirmaa; Artti Aigro	Elva SuK I Rauno Loit; Kevin Maltsev; Kristjan Ilves	Nõmme SK I Robert Lee; Taavi Pappel; Siim-Tanel Sammelselg
2017	Otepää	Põhjakotkas; Markkus Alter; Karl-August Tiirmaa; Artti Aigro	Elva SuK; Andreas Ilves; Kevin Maltsev; Kristjan Ilves	Nõmme SK I Robert Lee; Ivo-Niklas Hermanson; Taavi Pappel

== Ladies ==
=== Winter ===
Year	Place	Gold	Silver	Bronze
2015	Otepää	Sandra Sillaste	Annemarii Bendi	Airiin Pikk
2016	Otepää	Triinu Hausenberg	Annemarii Bendi	Sandra Sillaste
2017	Otepää	Annemarii Bendi	Triinu Hausenberg	Meriliis Kukk

=== Summer ===
Year	Place	Gold	Silver	Bronze
2013	Otepää	Sandra Sillaste	Annemarii Bendi	Airiin Pikk
2014	Otepää	Annemarii Bendi	Sandra Sillaste	Airiin Pikk
2015	Otepää	Annemarii Bendi	Triinu Hausenberg	Sandra Sillaste
2016	Otepää	Triinu Hausenberg	Annemarii Bendi	Sandra Sillaste
2017	Otepää	Annemarii Bendi	Triinu Hausenberg	Carena Roomets
