= FIS Nordic World Ski Championships 2019 – Individual large hill =

Nordic ski competition

Individual large hill at the FIS Nordic World Ski Championships 2019
- Location: Innsbruck, Austria
- Dates: 22–23 February
- Competitors: 61 from 19 nations
- Winning points: 279.4

Medalists
gold medal	Markus Eisenbichler	Germany
silver medal	Karl Geiger	Germany
bronze medal	Killian Peier	Switzerland

The Individual large hill competition at the FIS Nordic World Ski Championships 2019 was held on 22 and 23 February 2019. A qualification was held on 22 February.

== Results ==
=== Qualification ===
The qualification was held on 22 February 2019 at 14:30.

Rank	Bib	Name	Country	Distance (m)	Points	Notes
1	53	Markus Eisenbichler	Germany	128.5	143.2	Q
2	52	Karl Geiger	Germany	131.0	141.1	Q
3	47	Killian Peier	Switzerland	127.5	137.5	Q
4	61	Ryōyū Kobayashi	Japan	126.0	136.5	Q
5	38	Michael Hayböck	Austria	125.0	130.2	Q
6	35	Philipp Aschenwald	Austria	127.0	128.9	Q
7	45	Andreas Stjernen	Norway	122.5	128.3	Q
8	33	Daiki Itō	Japan	126.0	125.2	Q
9	50	Evgeniy Klimov	Russia	122.5	124.3	Q
10	59	Stefan Kraft	Austria	118.5	124.1	Q
11	60	Kamil Stoch	Poland	120.0	124.0	Q
12	49	Halvor Egner Granerud	Norway	122.5	122.4	Q
12	37	Simon Ammann	Switzerland	121.0	122.4	Q
14	44	Richard Freitag	Germany	119.5	122.2	Q
15	46	Andreas Wellinger	Germany	119.5	121.7	Q
16	31	Peter Prevc	Slovenia	122.0	119.0	Q
17	29	Žiga Jelar	Slovenia	123.0	118.5	Q
18	32	Viktor Polášek	Czech Republic	121.5	118.4	Q
19	41	Junshirō Kobayashi	Japan	119.0	118.3	Q
20	51	Roman Koudelka	Czech Republic	118.5	118.0	Q
21	18	Andreas Schuler	Switzerland	124.0	117.8	Q
22	54	Timi Zajc	Slovenia	115.0	116.4	Q
23	48	Daniel Huber	Austria	118.5	116.2	Q
24	57	Dawid Kubacki	Poland	114.5	115.7	Q
25	55	Johann André Forfang	Norway	114.0	115.5	Q
26	42	Yukiya Satō	Japan	116.0	112.6	Q
27	43	Antti Aalto	Finland	114.5	111.7	Q
28	36	Manuel Fettner	Austria	117.5	111.6	Q
29	34	Vladimir Zografski	Bulgaria	119.5	109.9	Q
30	9	Jonathan Learoyd	France	121.0	109.6	Q
31	26	Mackenzie Boyd-Clowes	Canada	116.5	109.4	Q
32	56	Robert Johansson	Norway	110.5	107.9	Q
33	58	Piotr Żyła	Poland	110.5	106.0	Q
34	39	Anže Lanišek	Slovenia	113.0	105.7	Q
35	40	Jakub Wolny	Poland	111.5	104.3	Q
36	19	Jarkko Määttä	Finland	115.5	103.6	Q
37	28	Dmitry Vassiliev	Russia	115.5	101.9	Q
38	30	Kevin Bickner	United States	114.0	100.6	Q
39	25	Čestmír Kožíšek	Czech Republic	112.0	100.2	Q
40	4	Luca Egloff	Switzerland	114.0	99.8	Q
41	24	Alex Insam	Italy	112.0	98.9	Q
42	17	Sebastian Colloredo	Italy	115.0	98.7	Q
43	14	Sergey Tkachenko	Kazakhstan	116.0	98.6	Q
44	21	Tomáš Vančura	Czech Republic	112.0	97.6	Q
45	12	Kevin Maltsev	Estonia	115.0	96.3	Q
46	23	Roman Trofimov	Russia	111.0	94.6	Q
47	7	Casey Larson	United States	114.0	94.4	Q
48	8	Vitaliy Kalinichenko	Ukraine	114.0	92.3	Q
49	6	Andrew Urlaub	United States	112.0	92.3	Q
50	22	Eetu Nousiainen	Finland	108.5	91.6	Q
51	20	Andreas Alamommo	Finland	109.0	90.6	
52	5	Matthew Soukup	Canada	111.0	90.3	
53	13	Denis Kornilov	Russia	111.0	89.3	
54	11	Sabirzhan Muminov	Kazakhstan	113.5	88.6	
55	27	Artti Aigro	Estonia	107.5	88.1	
56	2	Patrick Gasienica	United States	105.5	84.7	
57	1	Martti Nõmme	Estonia	104.0	78.7	
58	10	Yevhen Marusiak	Ukraine	101.5	70.2	
59	15	Flórián Molnár	Hungary	99.5	67.6	
60	16	Nikita Devyatkin	Kazakhstan	95.0	59.7	
61	3	Gleb Safonov	Kazakhstan	74.0	20.8	

=== Final ===
The first round was started on 23 February at 14:30 and the final round at 15:44.

Rank	Bib	Name	Country	Round 1			Final round			Total
Rank	Bib	Name	Country	Distance (m)	Points	Rank	Distance (m)	Points	Rank	Points
1st place, gold medalist(s)	42	Markus Eisenbichler	Germany	131.5	136.7	2	135.5	142.7	1	279.4
2nd place, silver medalist(s)	41	Karl Geiger	Germany	131.0	135.2	4	130.5	132.1	3	267.3
3rd place, bronze medalist(s)	36	Killian Peier	Switzerland	131.0	137.9	1	129.5	128.2	4	266.1
4	50	Ryōyū Kobayashi	Japan	133.5	135.3	3	126.5	126.7	7	262.0
5	49	Kamil Stoch	Poland	128.5	127.2	7	129.5	132.2	2	259.4
6	48	Stefan Kraft	Austria	130.0	128.6	5	126.5	127.5	5	256.1
7	44	Johann André Forfang	Norway	132.5	128.6	5	125.5	122.3	11	250.9
8	45	Robert Johansson	Norway	128.0	122.9	10	129.0	126.0	8	248.9
9	33	Richard Freitag	Germany	125.5	121.6	11	129.5	127.1	6	248.7
10	43	Timi Zajc	Slovenia	127.0	125.1	8	124.0	120.4	12	245.5
11	37	Daniel Huber	Austria	126.0	124.0	9	125.5	118.0	16	242.0
12	46	Dawid Kubacki	Poland	128.5	121.6	11	125.5	118.6	15	240.2
13	24	Philipp Aschenwald	Austria	120.0	113.9	18	128.0	126.0	8	239.9
14	27	Michael Hayböck	Austria	122.0	113.4	19	125.5	120.3	13	233.7
15	26	Simon Ammann	Switzerland	122.5	115.4	17	126.0	115.2	17	230.6
16	20	Peter Prevc	Slovenia	123.5	119.0	16	122.0	111.5	21	230.5
17	30	Junshirō Kobayashi	Japan	116.0	104.5	29	132.0	125.5	10	230.0
18	39	Evgeniy Klimov	Russia	126.5	119.5	15	121.0	109.6	23	229.1
19	47	Piotr Żyła	Poland	128.5	120.2	14	121.0	108.5	24	228.7
20	22	Daiki Itō	Japan	119.0	106.1	25	126.0	119.6	14	225.7
21	31	Yukiya Satō	Japan	120.0	106.8	23	124.0	114.6	18	221.4
22	40	Roman Koudelka	Czech Republic	120.5	110.4	21	120.5	109.7	22	220.1
23	18	Žiga Jelar	Slovenia	118.5	107.8	22	121.0	112.0	20	219.8
24	25	Manuel Fettner	Austria	117.5	105.7	27	122.5	113.3	19	219.0
25	21	Viktor Polášek	Czech Republic	120.0	110.5	20	117.5	107.7	26	218.2
26	9	Andreas Schuler	Switzerland	117.5	105.1	28	119.0	107.5	27	212.6
27	16	Mackenzie Boyd-Clowes	Canada	117.0	104.1	30	118.5	108.0	25	212.1
28	5	Jonathan Learoyd	France	116.5	106.6	24	116.5	99.3	28	205.9
29	34	Andreas Stjernen	Norway	124.5	120.3	13	102.0	65.2	29	185.5
30	23	Vladimir Zografski	Bulgaria	117.0	106.1	25	Disqualified			
31	32	Antti Aalto	Finland	117.5	104.0	31	Did not qualify			
32	35	Andreas Wellinger	Germany	119.5	103.1	32	Did not qualify			
33	38	Halvor Egner Granerud	Norway	116.5	103.0	33	Did not qualify			
34	15	Čestmír Kožíšek	Czech Republic	115.5	102.5	34	Did not qualify			
35	28	Anže Lanišek	Slovenia	114.5	100.8	35	Did not qualify			
36	7	Sergey Tkachenko	Kazakhstan	115.5	99.2	36	Did not qualify			
37	19	Kevin Bickner	United States	115.0	97.1	37	Did not qualify			
38	3	Casey Larson	United States	115.0	93.9	38	Did not qualify			
38	1	Luca Egloff	Switzerland	112.5	93.9	38	Did not qualify			
40	29	Jakub Wolny	Poland	113.0	91.8	40	Did not qualify			
41	14	Alex Insam	Italy	112.0	90.8	41	Did not qualify			
42	4	Vitaliy Kalinichenko	Ukraine	112.5	88.2	42	Did not qualify			
43	13	Roman Trofimov	Russia	109.5	86.3	43	Did not qualify			
44	6	Kevin Maltsev	Estonia	112.5	85.8	44	Did not qualify			
44	2	Andrew Urlaub	United States	110.5	85.8	44	Did not qualify			
46	17	Dmitry Vassiliev	Russia	107.0	82.7	46	Did not qualify			
47	8	Sebastian Colloredo	Italy	106.5	78.8	47	Did not qualify			
48	12	Eetu Nousiainen	Finland	103.5	77.8	48	Did not qualify			
49	11	Tomáš Vančura	Czech Republic	100.0	69.8	49	Did not qualify			
50	10	Jarkko Määttä	Finland	98.0	66.7	50	Did not qualify			
