= FIS Nordic World Ski Championships 2017 – Individual large hill =

Men's individual large hill at the FIS Nordic World Ski Championships 2017
- Venue: Salpausselkä
- Location: Lahti, Finland
- Date: 2 March
- Competitors: 50 from 15 nations
- Winning points: 279.3

Medalists
| gold medal | Stefan Kraft | Austria |
| silver medal | Andreas Wellinger | Germany |
| bronze medal | Piotr Żyła | Poland |

The Men's individual large hill event of the FIS Nordic World Ski Championships 2017 was held on 2 March 2017.

== Results ==
=== Qualification ===
The qualification was held on 1 March 2017.

| Rank | Bib | Name | Country | Distance (m) | Points | Notes |
|---|---|---|---|---|---|---|
| 1 | 15 | Antti Aalto | Finland | 128.5 | 123.4 | Q |
| 2 | 51 | Andreas Stjernen | Norway | 125.0 | 121.8 | Q |
| 3 | 45 | Daiki Ito | Japan | 121.5 | 116.3 | Q |
| 4 | 28 | Viktor Polášek | Czech Republic | 119.5 | 114.8 | Q |
| 5 | 38 | Simon Ammann | Switzerland | 124.0 | 114.5 | Q |
| 6 | 30 | Jarkko Määttä | Finland | 119.5 | 113.5 | Q |
| 7 | 25 | Ville Larinto | Finland | 117.5 | 112.4 | Q |
| 8 | 27 | Tomáš Vančura | Czech Republic | 118.0 | 111.3 | Q |
| 9 | 48 | Dawid Kubacki | Poland | 119.0 | 110.9 | Q |
| 9 | 44 | Noriaki Kasai | Japan | 119.0 | 110.9 | Q |
| 11 | 42 | Anders Fannemel | Norway | 116.5 | 110.1 | Q |
| 12 | 41 | Taku Takeuchi | Japan | 117.5 | 109.7 | Q |
| 13 | 13 | Killian Peier | Switzerland | 116.5 | 108.8 | Q |
| 14 | 20 | Michael Glasder | United States | 116.0 | 108.6 | Q |
| 15 | 33 | MacKenzie Boyd-Clowes | Canada | 115.0 | 107.5 | Q |
| 16 | 29 | Janne Ahonen | Finland | 116.0 | 106.1 | Q |
| 17 | 34 | Johann André Forfang | Norway | 114.5 | 104.5 | Q |
| 18 | 36 | Jakub Janda | Czech Republic | 114.0 | 104.3 | Q |
| 19 | 6 | Alex Insam | Italy | 116.0 | 104.1 | Q |
| 20 | 22 | Gregor Deschwanden | Switzerland | 114.0 | 104.0 | Q |
| 21 | 16 | William Rhoads | United States | 116.0 | 103.6 | Q |
| 22 | 37 | Markus Schiffner | Austria | 115.5 | 102.3 | Q |
| 23 | 47 | Stephan Leyhe | Germany | 113.5 | 101.6 | Q |
| 24 | 24 | Dimitry Vassiliev | Russia | 113.0 | 101.5 | Q |
| 25 | 40 | Jernej Damjan | Slovenia | 113.5 | 101.3 | Q |
| 26 | 35 | Denis Kornilov | Russia | 110.5 | 98.4 | Q |
| 27 | 52 | Richard Freitag | Germany | 114.5 | 97.8 | Q |
| 27 | 50 | Vincent Descombes Sevoie | France | 114.0 | 97.8 | Q |
| 29 | 19 | Kaarel Nurmsalu | Estonia | 111.0 | 97.3 | Q |
| 30 | 39 | Anže Lanišek | Slovenia | 109.5 | 97.2 | Q |
| 31 | 31 | Sebastian Colloredo | Italy | 111.0 | 95.6 | Q |
| 32 | 21 | Davide Bresadola | Italy | 108.5 | 94.7 | Q |
| 33 | 3 | Casey Larson | United States | 108.5 | 90.3 | Q |
| 34 | 32 | Kevin Bickner | United States | 108.0 | 89.7 | Q |
| 35 | 8 | Martti Nõmme | Estonia | 108.5 | 89.1 | Q |
| 36 | 46 | Jurij Tepeš | Slovenia | 107.0 | 88.3 | Q |
| 37 | 26 | Alexey Romashov | Russia | 106.0 | 86.7 | Q |
| 38 | 11 | Andreas Schuler | Switzerland | 107.0 | 85.4 | Q |
| 39 | 49 | Evgeni Klimov | Russia | 105.5 | 84.1 | Q |
| 40 | 23 | Kento Sakuyama | Japan | 102.5 | 82.8 | Q |
| 41 | 5 | Artti Aigro | Estonia | 102.0 | 78.2 | |
| 42 | 43 | Roman Koudelka | Czech Republic | 98.5 | 72.0 | |
| 43 | 4 | Ilya Kratov | Kazakhstan | 93.0 | 60.2 | |
| 44 | 17 | Fatih İpcioğlu | Turkey | 95.0 | 60.1 | |
| 45 | 7 | Nikolay Karpenko | Kazakhstan | 92.0 | 56.4 | |
| 46 | 18 | Alexey Korolev | Kazakhstan | 88.5 | 51.7 | |
| 47 | 2 | Vitaliy Kalinichenko | Ukraine | 88.0 | 49.5 | |
| 48 | 10 | Roman Nogin | Kazakhstan | 82.5 | 36.7 | |
| 49 | 1 | Artur Sarkisiani | Georgia | 72.0 | 16.1 | |
| — | 9 | Joshua Maurer | Canada | DSQ | | |
| — | 12 | Vladimir Zografski | Bulgaria | DSQ | | |
| — | 14 | Kristaps Nežborts | Latvia | DNS | | |
Prequalified
| | 53 | Piotr Żyła | Poland | 121.5 | | Q |
| | 54 | Peter Prevc | Slovenia | 127.5 | | Q |
| | 55 | Markus Eisenbichler | Germany | 105.5 | | Q |
| | 56 | Manuel Fettner | Austria | 121.5 | | Q |
| | 57 | Michael Hayböck | Austria | 110.5 | | Q |
| | 58 | Andreas Wellinger | Germany | 114.0 | | Q |
| | 59 | Maciej Kot | Poland | 115.0 | | Q |
| | 60 | Daniel-André Tande | Norway | 113.5 | | Q |
| | 61 | Stefan Kraft | Austria | 118.5 | | Q |
| | 62 | Kamil Stoch | Poland | 113.5 | | Q |

=== Final ===
The final was held on 2 March 2017.

| Rank | Bib | Name | Country | Round 1 Distance (m) | Round 1 Points | Round 1 Rank | Final Round Distance (m) | Final Round Points | Final Round Rank | Total Points |
|---|---|---|---|---|---|---|---|---|---|---|
| 1st place, gold medalist(s) | 49 | Stefan Kraft | Austria | 127.5 | 139.6 | 1 | 127.5 | 139.7 | 2 | 279.3 |
| 2nd place, silver medalist(s) | 46 | Andreas Wellinger | Germany | 127.5 | 138.7 | 2 | 129.0 | 139.3 | 3 | 278.0 |
| 3rd place, bronze medalist(s) | 41 | Piotr Żyła | Poland | 127.5 | 134.8 | 6 | 131.0 | 141.9 | 1 | 276.7 |
| 4 | 39 | Andreas Stjernen | Norway | 129.0 | 137.0 | 3 | 129.0 | 139.1 | 5 | 276.1 |
| 5 | 31 | Anders Fannemel | Norway | 123.5 | 131.5 | 10 | 127.0 | 137.3 | 6 | 268.8 |
| 6 | 47 | Maciej Kot | Poland | 123.5 | 130.3 | 12 | 126.5 | 136.6 | 7 | 266.9 |
| 7 | 50 | Kamil Stoch | Poland | 127.5 | 136.7 | 4 | 124.5 | 128.1 | 10 | 264.8 |
| 8 | 36 | Dawid Kubacki | Poland | 128.5 | 136.6 | 5 | 123.0 | 127.2 | 13 | 263.8 |
| 9 | 42 | Peter Prevc | Slovenia | 128.0 | 134.6 | 7 | 124.5 | 129.1 | 9 | 263.7 |
| 10 | 48 | Daniel-André Tande | Norway | 121.5 | 122.0 | 18 | 129.5 | 139.3 | 3 | 261.3 |
| 11 | 45 | Michael Hayböck | Austria | 121.5 | 124.1 | 16 | 128.0 | 136.2 | 8 | 260.3 |
| 12 | 23 | Johann André Forfang | Norway | 127.0 | 132.5 | 8 | 122.5 | 127.4 | 11 | 259.9 |
| 13 | 43 | Markus Eisenbichler | Germany | 125.5 | 130.6 | 11 | 123.5 | 127.4 | 11 | 258.0 |
| 14 | 27 | Simon Ammann | Switzerland | 122.5 | 125.8 | 14 | 125.5 | 127.0 | 14 | 252.8 |
| 15 | 33 | Daiki Ito | Japan | 122.0 | 127.0 | 13 | 120.0 | 121.7 | 16 | 248.7 |
| 16 | 35 | Stephan Leyhe | Germany | 125.0 | 132.2 | 9 | 117.5 | 115.0 | 20 | 247.2 |
| 17 | 30 | Taku Takeuchi | Japan | 122.0 | 123.8 | 17 | 121.0 | 121.0 | 18 | 244.8 |
| 18 | 44 | Manuel Fettner | Austria | 118.0 | 116.8 | 21 | 122.5 | 125.9 | 15 | 242.7 |
| 19 | 40 | Richard Freitag | Germany | 121.0 | 124.5 | 15 | 115.5 | 111.2 | 23 | 235.7 |
| 20 | 37 | Evgeni Klimov | Russia | 120.0 | 117.1 | 20 | 117.5 | 117.2 | 19 | 234.3 |
| 21 | 29 | Jernej Damjan | Slovenia | 113.5 | 111.0 | 29 | 120.0 | 121.1 | 17 | 232.2 |
| 22 | 26 | Markus Schiffner | Austria | 120.0 | 121.5 | 19 | 113.5 | 106.7 | 27 | 227.2 |
| 23 | 18 | Janne Ahonen | Finland | 115.0 | 111.9 | 27 | 116.0 | 113.7 | 21 | 225.6 |
| 24 | 13 | Dimitry Vassiliev | Russia | 120.0 | 115.0 | 23 | 115.5 | 110.3 | 26 | 225.3 |
| 25 | 17 | Viktor Polášek | Czech Republic | 116.0 | 114.0 | 24 | 115.5 | 111.0 | 25 | 225.0 |
| 26 | 14 | Ville Larinto | Finland | 118.0 | 113.4 | 26 | 115.5 | 111.2 | 23 | 224.6 |
| 27 | 19 | Jarkko Määttä | Finland | 116.0 | 109.8 | 30 | 117.5 | 112.8 | 22 | 222.6 |
| 28 | 25 | Jakub Janda | Czech Republic | 118.5 | 115.8 | 22 | 111.0 | 103.6 | 28 | 219.4 |
| 29 | 24 | Denis Kornilov | Russia | 119.5 | 114.0 | 24 | 108.5 | 95.1 | 30 | 209.1 |
| 30 | 21 | Kevin Bickner | United States | 117.0 | 111.8 | 28 | 104.0 | 95.5 | 29 | 207.3 |
| 31 | 6 | Antti Aalto | Finland | 115.0 | 109.3 | 31 | DNQ | | | |
| 32 | 32 | Noriaki Kasai | Japan | 114.0 | 108.1 | 32 | DNQ | | | |
| 33 | 38 | Vincent Descombes Sevoie | France | 114.0 | 105.2 | 33 | DNQ | | | |
| 34 | 34 | Jurij Tepeš | Slovenia | 111.5 | 104.1 | 34 | DNQ | | | |
| 35 | 11 | Gregor Deschwanden | Switzerland | 112.5 | 102.3 | 35 | DNQ | | | |
| 36 | 28 | Anže Lanišek | Slovenia | 110.0 | 99.7 | 36 | DNQ | | | |
| 37 | 2 | Alex Insam | Italy | 107.0 | 97.5 | 37 | DNQ | | | |
| 38 | 22 | MacKenzie Boyd-Clowes | Canada | 108.0 | 94.6 | 38 | DNQ | | | |
| 39 | 7 | William Rhoads | United States | 107.0 | 93.1 | 39 | DNQ | | | |
| 40 | 9 | Michael Glasder | United States | 106.0 | 92.4 | 40 | DNQ | | | |
| 41 | 5 | Killian Peier | Switzerland | 106.5 | 92.4 | 41 | DNQ | | | |
| 42 | 16 | Tomáš Vančura | Czech Republic | 104.5 | 91.7 | 42 | DNQ | | | |
| 43 | 20 | Sebastian Colloredo | Italy | 107.0 | 89.9 | 43 | DNQ | | | |
| 44 | 3 | Martti Nõmme | Estonia | 106.0 | 89.1 | 44 | DNQ | | | |
| 45 | 8 | Kaarel Nurmsalu | Estonia | 103.5 | 87.4 | 45 | DNQ | | | |
| 46 | 1 | Casey Larson | United States | 102.5 | 86.3 | 46 | DNQ | | | |
| 47 | 4 | Andreas Schuler | Switzerland | 103.0 | 84.3 | 47 | DNQ | | | |
| 48 | 10 | Davide Bresadola | Italy | 101.5 | 83.4 | 48 | DNQ | | | |
| 49 | 15 | Alexey Romashov | Russia | 102.0 | 83.3 | 49 | DNQ | | | |
| 50 | 12 | Kento Sakuyama | Japan | 102.0 | 81.9 | 50 | DNQ | | | |
