= Ski jumping at the 2022 Winter Olympics – Men's large hill individual =

Men's large hill individual at the XXIV Olympic Winter Games
- Ski jumping
- Venue: Snow Ruyi, Zhangjiakou
- Date: 11–12 February 2022
- Competitors: 56 from 20 nations
- Winning points: 296.1

Medalists
1st place, gold medalist(s)		Marius Lindvik	Norway
2nd place, silver medalist(s)		Ryōyū Kobayashi	Japan
3rd place, bronze medalist(s)		Karl Geiger	Germany

The men's large hill individual competition of the Beijing 2022 Olympics was held on 11 and 12 February, at the Snow Ruyi hill in Zhangjiakou. Marius Lindvik of Norway won the event, which became his first Olympic medal. Ryōyū Kobayashi of Japan became the silver medalist, and Karl Geiger of Germany won the bronze medal, his first individual Olympic medal.

The defending champion was Kamil Stoch. The 2018 silver medalist, Andreas Wellinger, did not qualify for the Olympics, but the bronze medalist, Robert Johansson, did. Stefan Kraft was the 2021 World champion. Johansson and Geiger were the silver and bronze medalists, respectively. Geiger was leading the 2021–22 FIS Ski Jumping World Cup at the start of the Olympics, followed by Kobayashi, Halvor Egner Granerud, and Lindvik.

Kobayashi was leading after the first jump, with Lindvik second, and Timi Zajc third. Zajc had a mediocre second jump, and Geiger, who was sixth, advanced to the bronze medal position. Lindvik's second jump was sufficient to overtake Kobayashi for gold.

== Schedule ==
=== Official training ===
GMT	Date	Event	Round	Country	Winner	Distance
10:00 AM	9 February 2022	Official training 1	R1	Norway	Halvor Egner Granerud	137.5 m (451 ft)
10:00 AM	9 February 2022	Official training 1	R2	Japan	Ryōyū Kobayashi	134.0 m (439.6 ft)
10:00 AM	9 February 2022	Official training 1	R3	Austria	Manuel Fettner	133.0 m (436.4 ft)
10:00 AM	10 February 2022	Official training 2	R1	Austria	Stefan Kraft	129.0 m (423.2 ft)
10:00 AM	10 February 2022	Official training 2	R2	Norway	Marius Lindvik	134.0 m (439.6 ft)
10:00 AM	10 February 2022	Official training 2	R3	Norway	Marius Lindvik	134.5 m (441 ft)

=== Qualifying ===
GMT	Date	Event	Round	Country	Winner	Distance
9:45 AM	11 February 2022	Trial round	TR	Austria	Stefan Kraft	127.5 m (418 ft)
11:00 AM	11 February 2022	Qualifications	Q	Norway	Marius Lindvik	135.0 m (442.9 ft)

=== Competition ===
GMT	Date	Event	Round	Country	Winner	Distance
10:00 AM	12 February 2022	Trial round	TR	Japan	Ryōyū Kobayashi	136.5 m (448 ft)
11:00 AM	12 February 2022	1st round	1R	Japan	Ryōyū Kobayashi	142.0 m (465.9 ft)
12:00 PM	12 February 2022	Final round	2R	Norway	Marius Lindvik	140.0 m (459.3 ft)

== Results ==
=== Qualifying ===
Rank	Bib	Name	Country	Distance (m)	Distance points	Judges points	Total	Notes
1	53	Marius Lindvik	Norway	135.0	78.0	55.5	136.4	Q
2	54	Halvor Egner Granerud	Norway	133.5	75.3	55.5	131.6	Q
3	40	Peter Prevc	Slovenia	131.0	70.8	54.0	128.3	Q
4	50	Stefan Kraft	Austria	128.5	66.3	55.0	127.6	Q
5	31	Danil Sadreev	ROC	136.5	80.7	51.5	127.3	Q
6	52	Markus Eisenbichler	Germany	129.0	67.2	52.5	123.3	Q
7	22	Antti Aalto	Finland	126.5	62.7	52.5	123.0	Q
8	39	Kamil Stoch	Poland	128.0	65.4	54.5	122.5	Q
9	55	Ryōyū Kobayashi	Japan	128.0	65.4	54.0	121.3	Q
10	48	Cene Prevc	Slovenia	128.5	66.3	52.0	121.1	Q
11	41	Manuel Fettner	Austria	128.0	65.4	54.0	120.5	Q
12	56	Karl Geiger	Germany	128.0	65.4	54.0	120.0	Q
13	32	Evgenii Klimov	ROC	130.0	69.0	54.0	119.5	Q
14	49	Daniel Huber	Austria	126.0	61.8	52.5	117.7	Q
15	51	Jan Hörl	Austria	127.0	63.6	52.5	117.0	Q
16	27	Roman Trofimov	ROC	123.5	57.3	52.0	116.0	Q
17	46	Robert Johansson	Norway	127.5	64.5	53.5	115.9	Q
18	23	Mackenzie Boyd-Clowes	Canada	122.0	54.6	51.0	115.8	Q
19	43	Lovro Kos	Slovenia	125.0	60.0	51.5	114.9	Q
19	42	Constantin Schmid	Germany	127.0	63.6	52.5	114.9	Q
21	20	Mikhail Nazarov	ROC	124.5	59.1	51.0	112.6	Q
22	30	Dawid Kubacki	Poland	125.5	60.9	52.5	112.5	Q
23	44	Yukiya Satō	Japan	126.0	61.8	51.5	111.7	Q
24	29	Simon Ammann	Switzerland	121.5	53.7	50.5	109.9	Q
25	5	Čestmír Kožíšek	Czech Republic	126.0	61.8	52.5	107.8	Q
26	37	Naoki Nakamura	Japan	122.0	54.6	51.5	107.1	Q
27	38	Piotr Żyła	Poland	120.0	51.0	51.0	106.3	Q
28	34	Daniel-André Tande	Norway	120.5	51.9	51.0	105.1	Q
29	36	Gregor Deschwanden	Switzerland	119.0	49.2	51.0	104.8	Q
30	35	Pius Paschke	Germany	119.0	49.2	49.5	102.9	Q
31	24	Artti Aigro	Estonia	117.0	45.6	49.5	102.0	Q
32	33	Junshirō Kobayashi	Japan	121.5	53.7	51.0	101.4	Q
33	45	Timi Zajc	Slovenia	120.0	51.0	48.0	101.1	Q
34	26	Dominik Peter	Switzerland	115.0	42.0	50.0	98.4	Q
35	19	Giovanni Bresadola	Italy	117.5	46.5	49.5	97.0	Q
36	25	Paweł Wąsek	Poland	117.5	46.5	48.0	96.5	Q
37	28	Vladimir Zografski	Bulgaria	117.0	45.6	50.0	95.6	Q
38	21	Decker Dean	United States	112.0	36.6	48.0	94.9	Q
39	47	Killian Peier	Switzerland	113.5	39.3	49.5	94.8	Q
40	17	Fatih Arda İpcioğlu	Turkey	116.0	43.8	46.0	94.6	Q
41	8	Kevin Maltsev	Estonia	113.0	38.4	49.0	94.3	Q
42	12	Vitaliy Kalinichenko	Ukraine	118.0	47.4	49.5	94.2	Q
43	11	Casey Larson	United States	116.5	44.7	49.0	89.2	Q
44	4	Daniel Cacina	Romania	114.0	40.2	49.0	88.8	Q
45	14	Kevin Bickner	United States	110.5	33.9	48.0	84.3	Q
45	10	Filip Sakala	Czech Republic	110.5	33.9	47.5	84.3	Q
47	9	Matthew Soukup	Canada	108.5	30.3	48.0	82.0	Q
48	18	Roman Koudelka	Czech Republic	109.0	31.2	48.5	79.5	Q
49	15	Yevhen Marusiak	Ukraine	104.0	22.2	47.5	76.0	Q
50	3	Radek Rýdl	Czech Republic	105.0	24.0	47.5	74.5	Q
51	1	Danil Vassilyev	Kazakhstan	98.5	12.3	46.5	69.4	
52	6	Andrei Feldorean	Romania	104.5	23.1	48.0	69.0	
53	13	Patrick Gasienica	United States	101.5	17.7	47.5	63.6	
54	7	Sergey Tkachenko	Kazakhstan	103.0	20.4	42.5	60.7	
55	16	Song Qiwu	China	94.5	5.1	46.0	50.7	
56	2	Anton Korchuk	Ukraine	82.5	-16.5	41.0	25.4	

=== Final ===
Rank	Bib	Name	Country	Round 1			Final round			Total
Rank	Bib	Name	Country	Distance (m)	Points	Rank	Distance (m)	Points	Rank	Points
1st place, gold medalist(s)	47	Marius Lindvik	Norway	140.5	144.8	2	140.0	151.3	1	296.1
2nd place, silver medalist(s)	49	Ryōyū Kobayashi	Japan	142.0	147.0	1	138.0	145.8	2	292.8
3rd place, bronze medalist(s)	50	Karl Geiger	Germany	138.0	136.7	6	138.0	144.6	3	281.3
4	33	Kamil Stoch	Poland	137.5	140.3	4	133.5	136.9	8	277.2
5	46	Markus Eisenbichler	Germany	137.5	135.2	8	139.5	140.5	4	275.7
6	39	Timi Zajc	Slovenia	138.5	140.7	3	130.5	132.5	14	273.2
7	35	Manuel Fettner	Austria	138.5	138.0	5	134.0	134.7	12	272.7
8	48	Halvor Egner Granerud	Norway	135.0	132.4	9	135.5	139.0	5	271.4
9	45	Jan Hörl	Austria	136.0	135.6	7	137.0	135.3	11	270.9
10	34	Peter Prevc	Slovenia	137.0	131.3	12	137.0	137.4	7	268.7
11	37	Lovro Kos	Slovenia	135.0	130.7	13	136.5	137.7	6	268.4
12	42	Cene Prevc	Slovenia	135.0	131.6	10	137.0	136.5	9	268.1
13	44	Stefan Kraft	Austria	131.5	127.9	19	136.5	136.2	10	264.1
14	36	Constantin Schmid	Germany	134.0	131.4	11	134.0	132.5	14	263.9
15	38	Yukiya Satō	Japan	133.0	128.4	18	134.5	132.2	17	260.6
16	25	Danil Sadreev	ROC	134.0	130.2	14	133.5	129.5	19	259.7
17	16	Antti Aalto	Finland	131.0	124.3	24	134.0	132.9	13	257.2
18	32	Piotr Żyła	Poland	134.0	129.7	15	131.0	125.8	25	255.5
19	26	Evgenii Klimov	ROC	133.0	126.8	22	132.5	128.7	21	255.5
20	43	Daniel Huber	Austria	133.0	127.4	21	132.5	127.7	22	255.1
21	19	Paweł Wąsek	Poland	129.0	121.9	28	134.5	132.4	16	254.3
22	30	Gregor Deschwanden	Switzerland	132.0	127.8	20	131.5	126.4	24	254.2
23	21	Roman Trofimov	ROC	133.0	128.8	16	130.5	125.1	26	253.9
24	27	Junshirō Kobayashi	Japan	130.0	120.4	30	134.0	131.6	18	252.0
25	23	Simon Ammann	Switzerland	131.5	122.4	27	132.5	129.0	20	251.4
26	24	Dawid Kubacki	Poland	131.0	123.7	25	131.5	127.5	23	251.2
27	41	Killian Peier	Switzerland	130.0	123.5	26	129.0	122.0	27	245.5
28	29	Pius Paschke	Germany	131.0	126.7	23	127.0	116.8	29	243.5
29	31	Naoki Nakamura	Japan	134.0	128.6	17	124.0	112.3	30	240.9
30	18	Artti Aigro	Estonia	130.0	121.4	29	127.5	117.9	28	239.3
31	28	Daniel-André Tande	Norway	128.0	120.2	31	did not advance			
32	40	Robert Johansson	Norway	128.5	119.3	32	did not advance			
33	17	Mackenzie Boyd-Clowes	Canada	128.5	119.2	33	did not advance			
34	14	Mikhail Nazarov	ROC	127.5	118.4	34	did not advance			
35	13	Giovanni Bresadola	Italy	127.0	114.6	35	did not advance			
36	20	Dominik Peter	Switzerland	126.0	114.3	36	did not advance			
37	4	Kevin Maltsev	Estonia	126.5	113.6	37	did not advance			
38	22	Vladimir Zografski	Bulgaria	125.0	112.5	38	did not advance			
39	9	Kevin Bickner	United States	125.0	110.0	39	did not advance			
40	11	Fatih Arda İpcioğlu	Turkey	124.0	109.5	40	did not advance			
41	12	Roman Koudelka	Czech Republic	124.0	108.7	41	did not advance			
42	3	Čestmír Kožíšek	Czech Republic	122.5	108.1	42	did not advance			
43	7	Casey Larson	United States	123.0	107.5	43	did not advance			
44	8	Vitaliy Kalinichenko	Ukraine	122.5	106.0	44	did not advance			
45	15	Decker Dean	United States	120.0	100.9	45	did not advance			
46	2	Daniel Cacina	Romania	119.0	97.8	46	did not advance			
47	1	Radek Rýdl	Czech Republic	118.5	96.7	47	did not advance			
48	6	Filip Sakala	Czech Republic	116.0	93.1	48	did not advance			
49	5	Matthew Soukup	Canada	115.0	90.8	49	did not advance			
50	10	Yevhen Marusiak	Ukraine	111.0	81.6	50	did not advance			
