= Hillar Hein =

Estonian ski jumper and Nordic combined skier

Hillar Hein (born 19 January 1954) is an Estonian ski jumper, Nordic combined skier and coach.

He was born in Tallinn. In 1998 he graduated from Tallinn Pedagogical Institute's Faculty of Physical Education.

He started his ski jumping exercise in 1964, coached by Uno Kajak, Enn Uhkai and Raimond Mürk. He is a multiple-time Estonian champion in ski jumping and Nordic combined skiing.

Since 1984 he has worked as a coach. His students include Jens Salumäe, Jaan Jüris, Kaarel Nurmsalu, and Artti Aigro.
