= Tiit Tamm =

Estonian ski jumper and coach

Tiit Tamm (born 18 April 1952 in Tallinn) is an Estonian ski jumper and coach.

1970-1979 he won several medals at Estonian Ski Jumping Championships.

Since 1978 he worked as a coach.

Students: Allar Levandi, Ago Markvardt, Peter Heli, Toomas Tiru, Magnar Freimuth, Ilmar Aluvee, Tambet Pikkor, Jens Salumäe.

Awards:

- 1994: Estonian Coach of the Year
