= Trofimov =

Trofimov (feminine form: Trofimova) is a Russian family name derived from the first name Trofim and literally meaning "Trofim's". The Ukrainian-language form is transliterated in the same as Russian; the Belarusian-language form is Trafimau/Trafimaw.

The surname may refer to the following notable people.

== A ==
- Aleksandr Trofimov (actor) (born 1952), Soviet and Russian actor
- Aleksandr Trofimov (footballer) (1937–2002), Soviet and Azerbaijani footballer
- Anatoly Trofimov (1940−2005), deputy director of the Russian Federal Security Service
- Andrei Trofimov (born 1985), Russian footballer

== B ==
- Boris Aleksandrovich Trofimov (born 1938), Soviet chemist

== D ==
- Daria Trofimova (born 2005), Russian swimmer

== K ==
- Kyrill Nikolayevich Trofimov (1921−1987), Soviet general

== M ==
- Mikhail Trofimov (born 1974), Russian professional football player

== N ==
- Nina Gopova-Trofimova (born 1953), Soviet sprint canoer
- Nikolay Trofimov (1920–2005), Soviet actor

== R ==
- Roman Sergeevich Trofimov (born 1989), Russian ski jumper

== S ==
- Sergei Trofimov (born 1966), Russian singer-songwriter

== U ==
- Ulyana Trofimova (born 1990), Uzbekistani rhythmic gymnast

== V ==
- Vasili Trofimov (1919–1999), Soviet football (soccer) and hockey player, multiple USSR champion
- Vikentii Trofimov (1878–1956), Russian painter
- Viktor Trofimov (1938–2013), former Soviet international speedway rider

== Y ==
- Yaroslav Trofimov (born 1969), Ukrainian-born Italian author and journalist
- Yuri Trofimov (born 1984), Russian road bicycle racer

== Z ==
- Zakhar Trofimov (1897–1961), Soviet general
