= FIS Nordic World Ski Championships 2017 – Team large hill =

Team large hill at the FIS Nordic World Ski Championships 2017
- Venue: Salpausselkä
- Location: Lahti, Finland
- Date: 4 March
- Competitors: 48 from 12 nations
- Teams: 12
- Winning points: 1104.2

Medalists
| gold medal | Piotr Żyła; Dawid Kubacki; Maciej Kot; Kamil Stoch | Poland |
| silver medal | Anders Fannemel; Johann André Forfang; Daniel-André Tande; Andreas Stjernen | Norway |
| bronze medal | Michael Hayböck; Manuel Fettner; Gregor Schlierenzauer; Stefan Kraft | Austria |

The Team large hill event of the FIS Nordic World Ski Championships 2017 was held on 4 March 2017.

== Results ==
The first round was started at 17:15 and the second round at 18:25.

| Rank | Bib | Country | Round 1 Distance (m) | Round 1 Points | Round 1 Rank | Final Round Distance (m) | Final Round Points | Final Round Rank | Total Points |
|---|---|---|---|---|---|---|---|---|---|
| 1st place, gold medalist(s) | 12 | Poland; Piotr Żyła; Dawid Kubacki; Maciej Kot; Kamil Stoch | 130.5; 129.0; 130.5; 130.5 | 591.9; 143.4; 143.2; 151.9; 153.4 | 1 | 123.0; 119.5; 121.5; 124.5 | 512.3; 128.3; 124.4; 124.2; 135.2 | 2 | 1104.2; 271.7; 267.6; 276.1; 288.8 |
| 2nd place, silver medalist(s) | 8 | Norway; Anders Fannemel; Johann André Forfang; Daniel-André Tande; Andreas Stjernen | 131.0; 126.5; 126.0; 127.5 | 564.3; 141.0; 137.9; 139.7; 145.7 | 4 | 112.5; 138.0; 126.0; 125.5 | 514.2; 111.8; 136.6; 131.2; 134.6 | 1 | 1078.5; 252.8; 274.5; 270.9; 280.3 |
| 3rd place, bronze medalist(s) | 11 | Austria; Michael Hayböck; Manuel Fettner; Gregor Schlierenzauer; Stefan Kraft | 130.0; 126.5; 124.0; 134.0 | 574.5; 140.9; 137.5; 134.5; 161.6 | 2 | 118.5; 121.0; 113.5; 126.0 | 494.4; 119.1; 122.4; 111.2; 141.7 | 3 | 1068.9; 260.0; 259.9; 245.7; 303.3 |
| 4 | 10 | Germany; Markus Eisenbichler; Stephan Leyhe; Richard Freitag; Andreas Wellinger | 130.5; 124.5; 128.5; 130.5 | 573.1; 140.4; 134.7; 145.2; 152.8 | 3 | 130.5; 103.5; 124.0; 119.0 | 479.8; 140.7; 89.5; 126.3; 123.3 | 4 | 1052.9; 281.1; 224.2; 271.5; 276.1 |
| 5 | 9 | Slovenia; Jurij Tepeš; Anže Lanišek; Jernej Damjan; Peter Prevc | 123.5; 121.0; 120.0; 127.5 | 516.9; 112.4; 129.9; 128.5; 146.1 | 5 | 106.5; 112.0; 113.0; 117.5 | 424.7; 95.1; 106.8; 103.8; 119.0 | 7 | 941.6; 207.5; 236.7; 232.3; 265.1 |
| 6 | 4 | Finland; Jarkko Määttä; Ville Larinto; Antti Aalto; Janne Ahonen | 120.5; 114.0; 122.0; 116.0 | 485.6; 121.2; 113.1; 129.9; 121.4 | 8 | 117.0; 117.0; 114.5; 112.0 | 440.9; 114.1; 109.6; 109.8; 107.4 | 5 | 926.5; 235.3; 222.7; 239.7; 228.8 |
| 7 | 6 | Japan; Taku Takeuchi; Ryoyu Kobayashi; Noriaki Kasai; Daiki Ito | 120.0; 114.5; 119.0; 119.0 | 487.6; 119.4; 113.9; 124.8; 129.5 | 7 | 115.5; 119.0; 105.0; 114.0 | 435.1; 111.9; 112.8; 92.9; 117.5 | 6 | 922.7; 231.3; 226.7; 217.7; 247.0 |
| 7 | 5 | Czech Republic; Viktor Polášek; Tomáš Vančura; Jakub Janda; Roman Koudelka | 125.0; 114.5; 120.0; 119.5 | 498.7; 129.7; 114.7; 126.3; 128.0 | 6 | 117.0; 109.0; 115.5; 113.0 | 424.0; 112.0; 92.4; 108.5; 111.1 | 8 | 922.7; 241.7; 207.1; 234.8; 239.1 |
| 9 | 7 | Russia; Alexey Romashov; Denis Kornilov; Dimitry Vassiliev; Evgeniy Klimov | 118.5; 113.0; 118.0; 118.5 | 473.4; 116.2; 108.4; 121.0; 127.8 | 9 | DNQ | | | |
| 10 | 3 | Switzerland; Gregor Deschwanden; Adrian Schuler; Killian Peier; Simon Ammann | 114.5; 106.0; 114.0; 123.5 | 453.0; 105.5; 96.6; 114.0; 136.9 | 10 | DNQ | | | |
| 11 | 2 | United States; Casey Larson; William Rhoads; Michael Glasder; Kevin Bickner | 93.0; 107.0; 108.0; 105.5 | 365.1; 64.8; 99.1; 101.0; 100.2 | 11 | DNQ | | | |
| 12 | 1 | Kazakhstan; Roman Nogin; Alexey Korolev; Nikolay Karpenko; Ilya Kratov | 75.0; 83.5; 81.0; 87.5 | 192.3; 29.4; 53.2; 45.4; 64.3 | 12 | DNQ | | | |
