= Jaan Jüris =

Estonian ski jumper (born 1977)

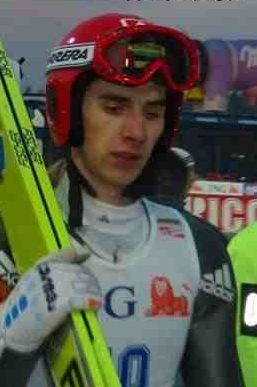

Personal information
- Nationality: Estonian
- Born: 23 June 1977 (age 49)

Sport
- Sport: Skiing

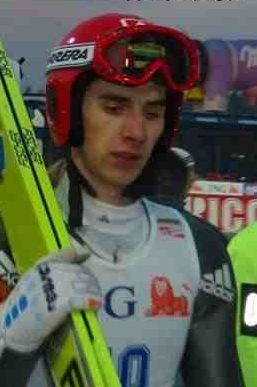
Jaan Jüris

Jaan Jüris (born 23 June 1977) is a retired Estonian ski jumper who has competed since 2000. He finished 50th in the individual normal hill event at the 2006 Winter Olympics in Turin.

Jüris's best finish at the FIS Nordic World Ski Championships was 38th in the individual normal hill at Val di Fiemme in 2003. He finished 43rd in the individual event at the 2002 Ski-flying World Championships in Harrachov.

Jüris's best individual World Cup finish was 15th in a large hill event in Germany in 2003. His best individual career finish was fourth in a Continental Cup large hill event in Austria in 2003.

In January 2008, he competed for the last time in his career and since then FIS counts him as a non active skier.

He has coached several Estonian ski jumpers, including Siim-Tanel Sammelselg, Martti Nõmme and Kevin Maltsev.
