= Trofim =

Trofim (Russian: Трофи́м), Trophimus or Trophimos, from τροφή (trophḗ, lit. 'nourishment') is a given name. It may refer to:

- Trophimus the Ephesian, a Christian who accompanied Paul
- Trophimus of Arles (died 3rd century), first bishop and patron saint of Arles
- Trofim Lomakin (1924–1973), Russian weightlifter
- Trofim Lysenko (1898–1976), Soviet agrobiologist
- Trofim Kichko, Soviet author of Judaism Without Embellishment, a 1963 antisemitic book
- Trophimus (died c. 278 AD), Christian martyr sharing feast day with Sabbatius and Dorymedon
- Trofim, secular name of Paul Meletiou (1880–1962), Belarusian bishop

== See also ==
- Sergei Trofimov, Russian singer
- Trofimov
