= Aleksandr Trofimov =

Aleksandr Trofimov may refer to:

- Aleksandr Trofimov (actor) (born 1952), Soviet and Russian actor
- Aleksandr Trofimov (footballer) (born 1937), Soviet and Azerbaijani footballer
- Aleksandr Trofimov (diplomat) (born 1937), Russian diplomat
