= Tambet =

Male given name

- Gender: Male
- Language: Estonian
- Name day: 21 July

Origin
- Region of origin: Estonia

Tambet is an Estonian masculine given name. Individuals bearing the name Tambet include:

- Tambet Pikkor (born 1980), Estonian ski jumper
- Tambet Tampuu (born 1963), Estonian lawyer and a judge
- Tambet Tuisk (born 1976), Estonian actor
