= Trafimau =

Trafimau or Trafimaw (feminine: Trafimava) is the Belarusian-language form of the Russian-language surname Trofimov. Notable people with the surname include:

- Nataliya Trafimava (born 1979), Belarusian basketball player
