= Karl-August Tiirmaa =

Estonian Nordic combined skier

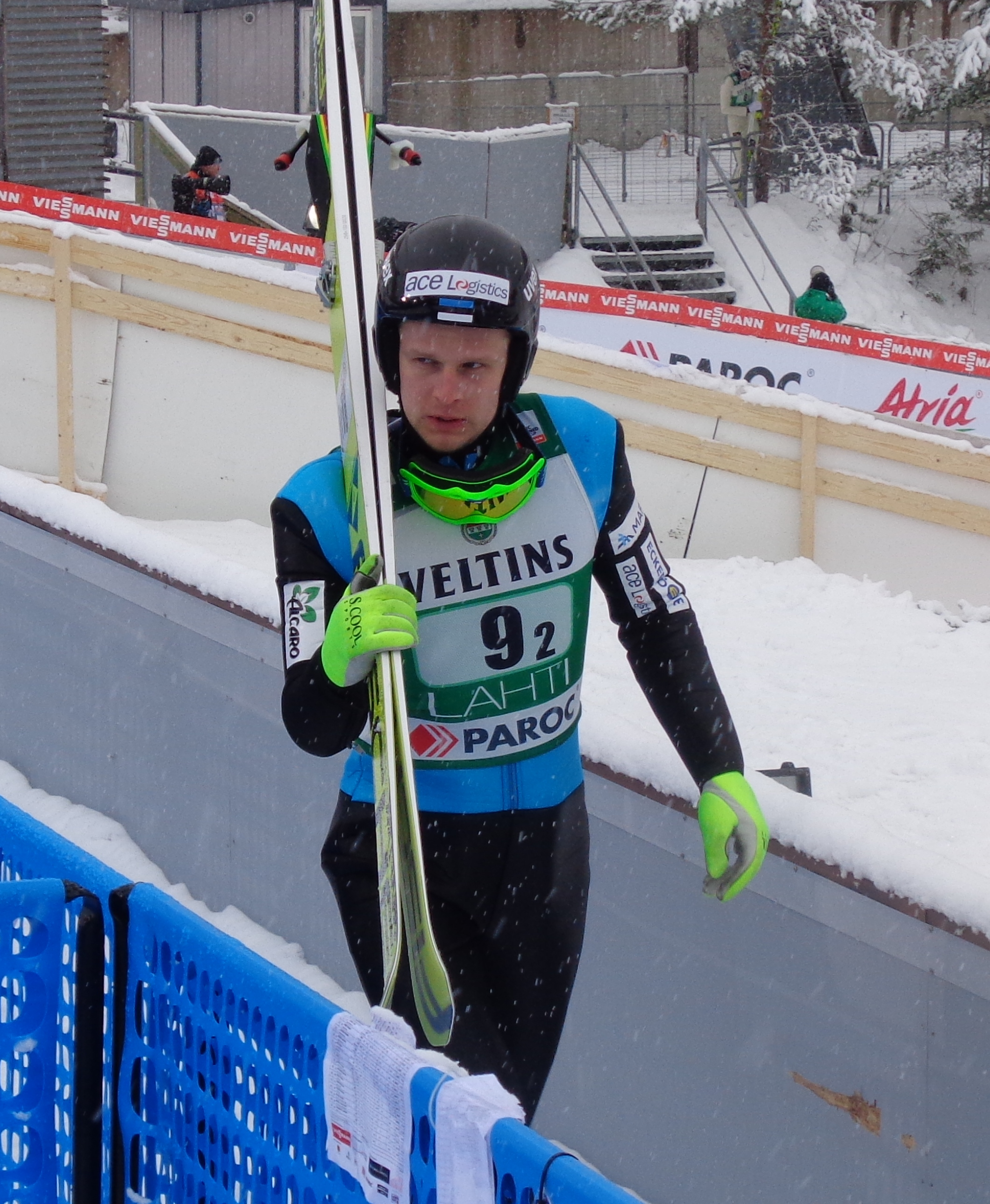
- Tiirmaa in 2016.

Personal information
- Nationality: Estonia
- Born: 7 July 1989 (age 37) Võru, then part of Estonian SSR, Soviet Union
- Occupation: Skier

Sport
- Sport: Skiing

Karl-August Tiirmaa (born 7 July 1989 in Võru) is an Estonian Nordic combined skier.

Tiirmaa competed at the 2014 Winter Olympics for Estonia. He placed 44th in the normal hill Nordic combined event, and 44th in the large hill event.

As of September 2014, his best showing at the World Championships is 9th, in the 2009 team event. His best individual finish is 39th, in the 2009 normal hill event.

Tiirmaa made his World Cup debut in January 2007. As of September 2014, his best finish is 12th, in a pair of team events. His best individual finish is 19th, at a normal hill event at Chaykovsky in 2013–14. His best World Cup overall finish is 60th, in 2013–14.

He represented Estonia at the 2018 Winter Olympics.
