= Aleksander Peepre =

Estonian Nordic combined skier

Aleksander Peepre (since 1936 Peekaln; 12 March 1915 – 3 January 1976) was an Estonian Nordic combined skier, coach and sport pedagogue.

He was born in Tallinn.

He participated on 1938 world championships. He was multiple-times Estonian champion in different winter sports disciplines, including slalom.

1941–1943 he taught skiing for German soldiers. 1943–1944 he was in Finnish military service. Later he moved to Canada.
