= Ilmar Aluvee =

Estonian Nordic combined skier

Personal information
- Nationality: Estonian
- Born: 25 November 1969 Tallinn, Estonia
- Died: 17 January 2013 (aged 43) Aegviidu, Estonia

Sport
- Sport: Ski jumping, Nordic combined

Ilmar Aluvee (25 November 1969 – 17 January 2013) was an Estonian ski jumper, Nordic combined athlete, and coach. He competed in the Nordic combined event at the 1994 Winter Olympics.

== Early life ==
Ilmar Aluvee was born in Tallinn to former Nordic combined athlete Valev Aluvee and Raaja Aluvee (née Kaasik). He graduated from secondary school in 1988 and was a 1997 graduate of Tallinn University of Technology. He began training with Uno Kajak in 1977 for Kalev Ski Club, and later with Tiit Tamm for Dünamo Ski Club.

== Career ==
In 1994, Aluvee placed 39th in Lillehammer at the 1994 Winter Olympics. In 1993, he placed 34th at the FIS Nordic World Ski Championships, 31st in 1995, in 1997 he placed 10th in individual competition and 11th in team competition. Between 1988 and 1998 at the Estonian Championships, he won one gold, two silver, and five bronze medals in the Nordic combined and two bronze medals in ski jumping, and two gold, two silver and two bronze in summer Nordic combined and one silver in summer ski jumping.

Between 1997 and 2001, Aluvee was a trainer at Tallinn's Estonian Sports Gymnasium and from 2006 until 2007, at the Otepää branch of the Audentes Gymnasium. Aluvee was the head coach of the national Estonian Nordic Combined Team from 2002 until 2004. In 2005, he began working as a cell tower installer.

== Death ==
On 17 January 2013, Aluvee was killed in an accidental fall while working on a cell tower in Aegviidu in Harju County, aged 43. He was interred at Rahumäe Cemetery.
