= Tõnu Haljand =

Estonian Nordic combined skier (1945–1997)

Personal information
- Nationality: Estonian
- Born: 1 July 1945; Tallinn, Estonia
- Died: 28 August 1997 (aged 52); Ähijärve, Estonia

Sport
- Sport: Nordic combined

Tõnu Haljand (1 July 1945 – 28 August 1997) was an Estonian ski jumper, Nordic combined skier and coach who competed for the Soviet Union.

Haljand finished 12th in the Nordic combined event at the 1968 Winter Olympics and 12th at the FIS Nordic World Ski Championships 1970. He was the Soviet Union's champion in Nordic combined skiing in 1973 and won silver medal in 1970, and bronze medals in 1966 and 1975.
