= Ilmar Pärtelpoeg =

Estonian politician

Ilmar Pärtelpoeg (24 December 1926 – 1 August 2013) was an Estonian ski jumper, economist, computer scientist, and politician. He was born Tallinn. Pärtelpoeg was a member of VII Riigikogu.
