= Kail Piho =

Estonian Nordic combined skier (born 1991)

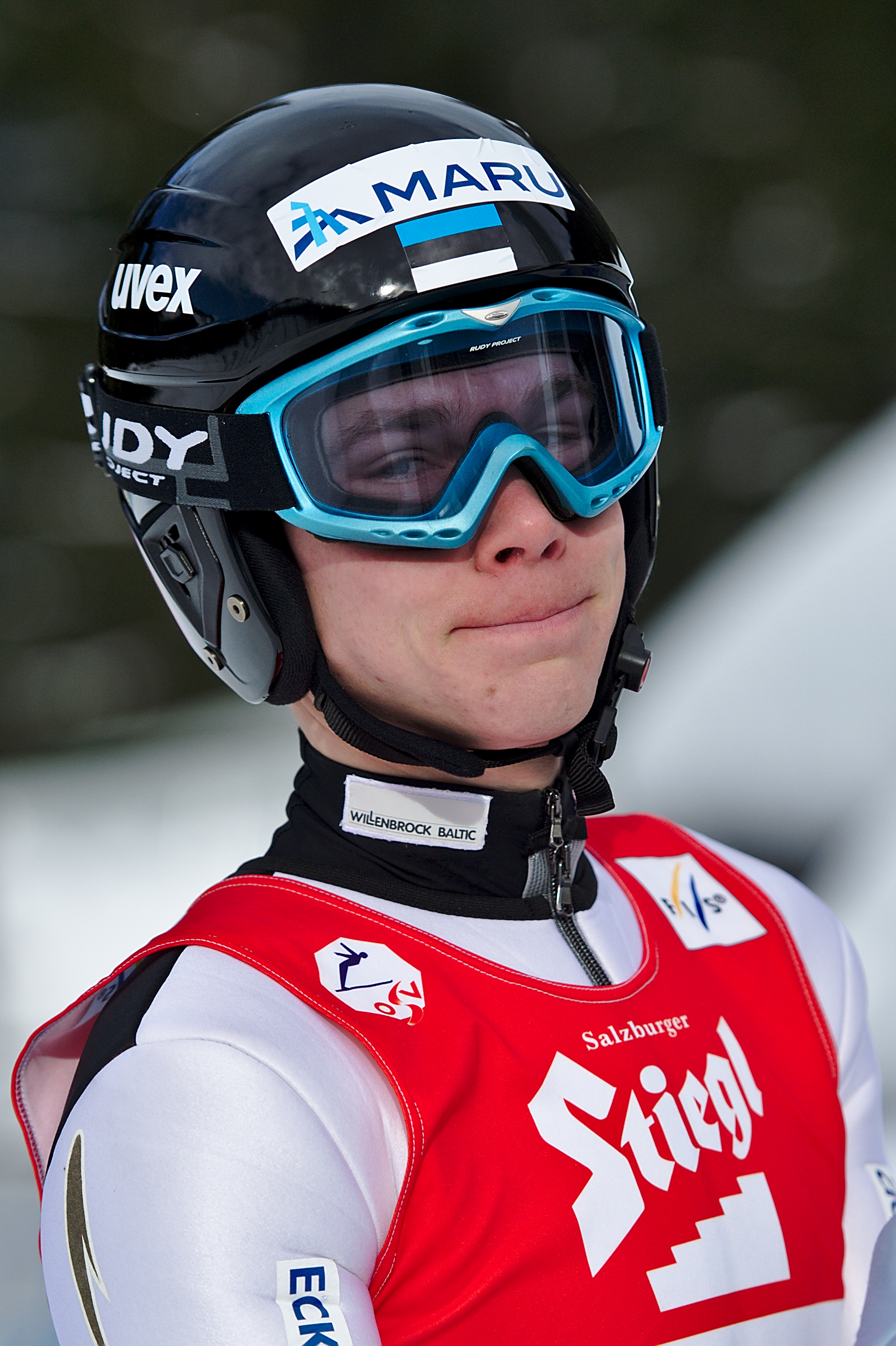

Personal information
- Full name: Kail Piho
- Born: 28 May 1991 (age 35) Võru

Sport
- Sport: Skiing
- Club: Sportclub Taevatäht

World Cup career
- Seasons: -

Kail Piho (born 28 May 1991) is an Estonian Nordic combined skier. He was born in Võru. He competed in the World Cup 2015 season.

He represented Estonia at the FIS Nordic World Ski Championships 2015 in Falun.
