= Illimar Pärn =

Estonian ski jumper

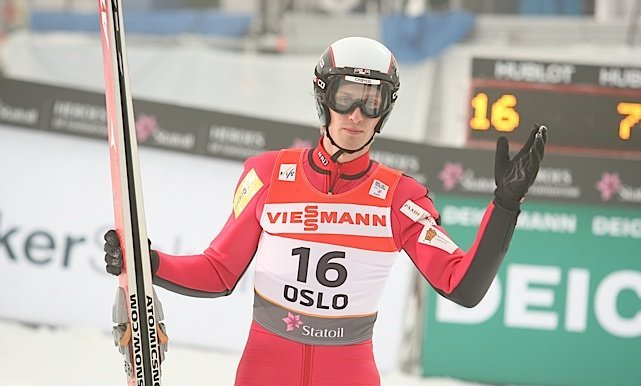

Personal information
- Full name: Illimar Pärn
- Nickname: Illi
- Born: 27 October 1988 (age 37) Tartu, then part of Estonian SSR, Soviet Union
- Height: 187 cm (6 ft 2 in)

Sport
- Sport: Skiing
- Club: Skiclub Elva

World Cup career
- Seasons: 2004–
- Indiv. podiums: 0
- Indiv. wins: 0
- Updated on May 2010

Illimar Pärn (born 27 October 1988) is an Estonian ski jumper. Pärn made his individual World Cup debut in Kuopio 2010. In 2005 he was a part of the Estonian World Cup team in Lahti.
