= Killian Peier =

Swiss ski jumper (born 1995)

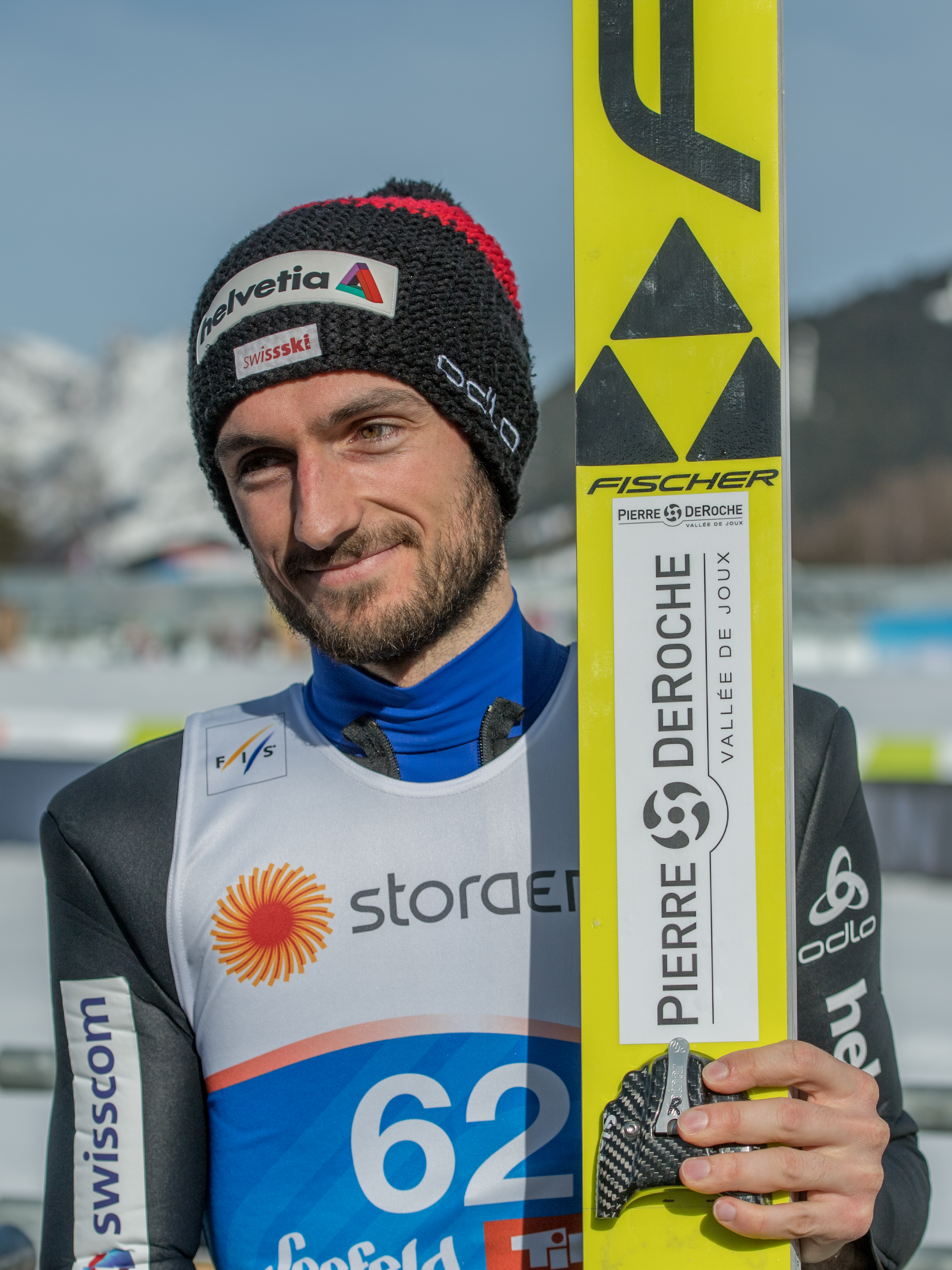
- Peier at the World Championships in Seefeld, 2019

Personal information
- Full name: Killian Peier
- Nationality: Switzerland
- Born: 28 March 1995 (age 31) La Sarraz, Switzerland

Sport
- Sport: Skiing
- Club: Vallee de Joux

World Cup career
- Seasons: 2014–present
- Indiv. starts: 88
- Indiv. podiums: 1

Achievements and titles
- Personal bests: 209.5 m (687 ft); Planica, 21 March 2019
Medal record
World Championships
Bronze medal – third place	2019 Seefeld	Individual LH
- Updated on 24 February 2019

Killian Peier (born 28 March 1995) is a Swiss ski jumper.

== Career ==
He competed at the FIS Nordic World Ski Championships 2013 in Val di Fiemme, where he placed 10th in the team jumping with the Swiss team. He represented Switzerland at the FIS Nordic World Ski Championships 2015 in Falun.

At the FIS Nordic World Ski Championships 2019 he took the bronze medal at the large hill event at the Bergisel Ski Jump in Innsbruck.

== Record ==
=== World Championship ===
Year	Normal hill	Large hill	Team	Mixed team
2013	—	—	10	—
2015	31	30	10	—
2017	18	40	10	—
2019	10	3	7	—
