= Oskar Veldeman =

Estonian motorsport person, ski jumper, and sport journalist

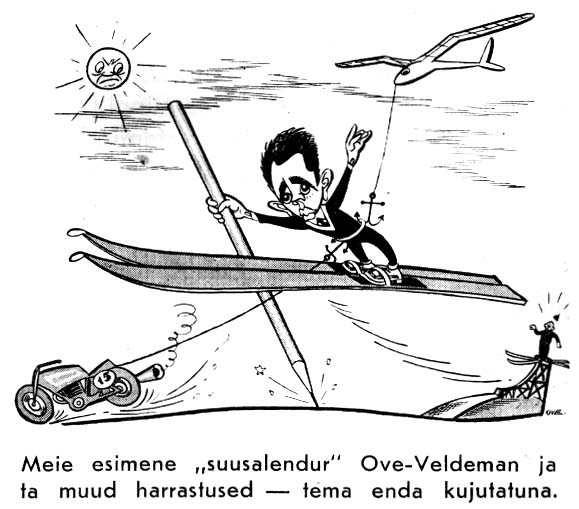
Self-portrait of Oskar Veldeman

Oskar Veldeman (or Veldemann; pseudonym O v e; 8 December 1912, Viljandi – 24 December 1942, Gorky Oblast) was an Estonian motorsport person, ski jumper and sport journalist.

In 1933, and 1936–1937 and 1940, he became 4-times Estonian champion in ski jumping. In 1938 he participated on World Championships in Lahti, Finland, but fell after the jumping.

He was also a motorsport racer. In 1933 and 1934 he became 2-times Estonian champion in hippodrome racing. 1934 and 1938 he won Tallinn Great Race (Estonian: Tallinna suursõit).

On 22 June 1940, following the Soviet occupation of Estonia, a demonstration against the occupation took place in Kadriorg, Tallinn. The participants of the demonstration elected a four-member delegation to deliver flowers to the President of the Republic, Konstantin Päts. Veldemann was among the delegation. Päts was not present at Kadriorg Palace and the flowers were handed over to General Aleksander Jaakson. Veldeman was arrested by the NKVD on 3 September 1940, on charges of belonging to an anti-Soviet organization. On 16 December 1941, Veldeman was sentenced to 10 years in prison by the Special Council of the NKVD on the basis of §58–10 of the Criminal Code. He died in the Sukhoy-Bezvodnaya prison camp in Gorky Oblast in the Russian Soviet Federative Socialist Republic on 24 December 1942.
