= Han Hendrik Piho =

Estonian Nordic combined skier

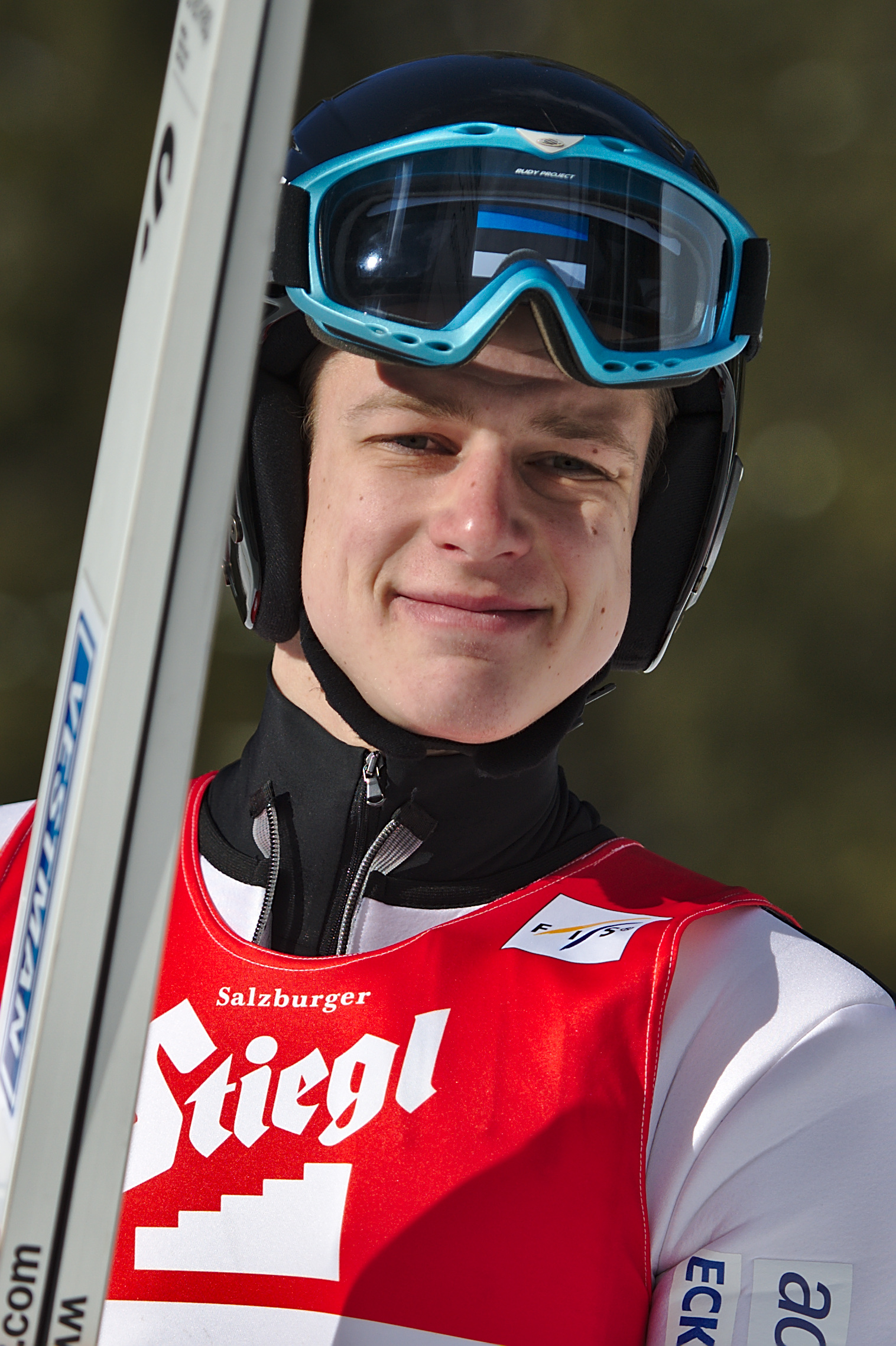

Personal information
- Born: 24 April 1993 (age 33) Võru, Estonia

Sport
- Sport: Skiing

Han Hendrik Piho (born 24 April 1993 in Võru) is an Estonian Nordic combined skier.

Piho competed at the 2014 Winter Olympics for Estonia. He placed 43rd in the normal hill Nordic combined event, and 36th in the large hill event.

As of September 2014, his best showing at the World Championships is 10th, in the 2013 team sprint event. His best individual finish is 33rd, in the 2013 normal hill event.

Piho made his World Cup debut in March 2012. As of September 2014, his best finish is 11th, in a pair of events in 2013–14. His best World Cup overall finish is 49th, in 2013–14.
