= Kalev Aigro =

Estonian Nordic combined skier (born 1959)

Kalev Aigro (born 15 February 1959) is an Estonian Nordic combined skier.

He was born in Otepää.

He began his Nordic combined career in 1971, coached by Heido Meema and Silver Eljand. In 1978 he won Soviet Union junior championships. He is multiple-times Estonian champion.

Since 1989 he worked as a skiing track master (Estonian: rajameister).
