= Siim-Tanel Sammelselg =

Estonian ski jumper

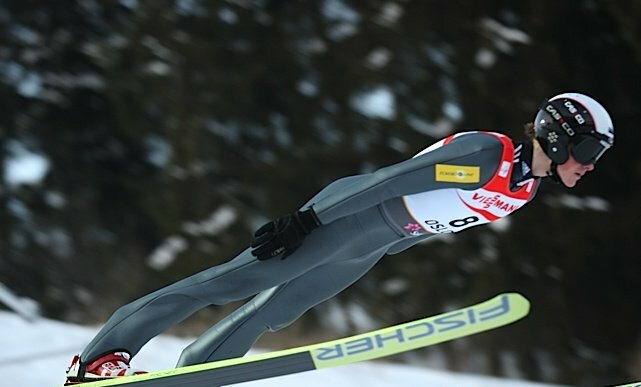

Personal information
- Born: May 18, 1993 (age 33) Tallinn, Estonia

Sport
- Sport: Skiing

Siim-Tanel Sammelselg (born May 13, 1998) is an Estonian ski jumper. He was born in Tallinn.

Sammelselg competed at the 2014 Winter Olympics for Estonia. He placed 51st in the normal hill qualifying round, failing to advance, and 49th in the large hill qualifying round, also failing to advance. Sammelselg made his World Cup debut in November 2007. As of September 2014, his best finish is 9th, in a team event at Lahti in 2011–12. His best individual finish is 45th, at a large hill event at Sapporo in 2013–14.
