= Andreas Schuler =

Swiss ski jumper

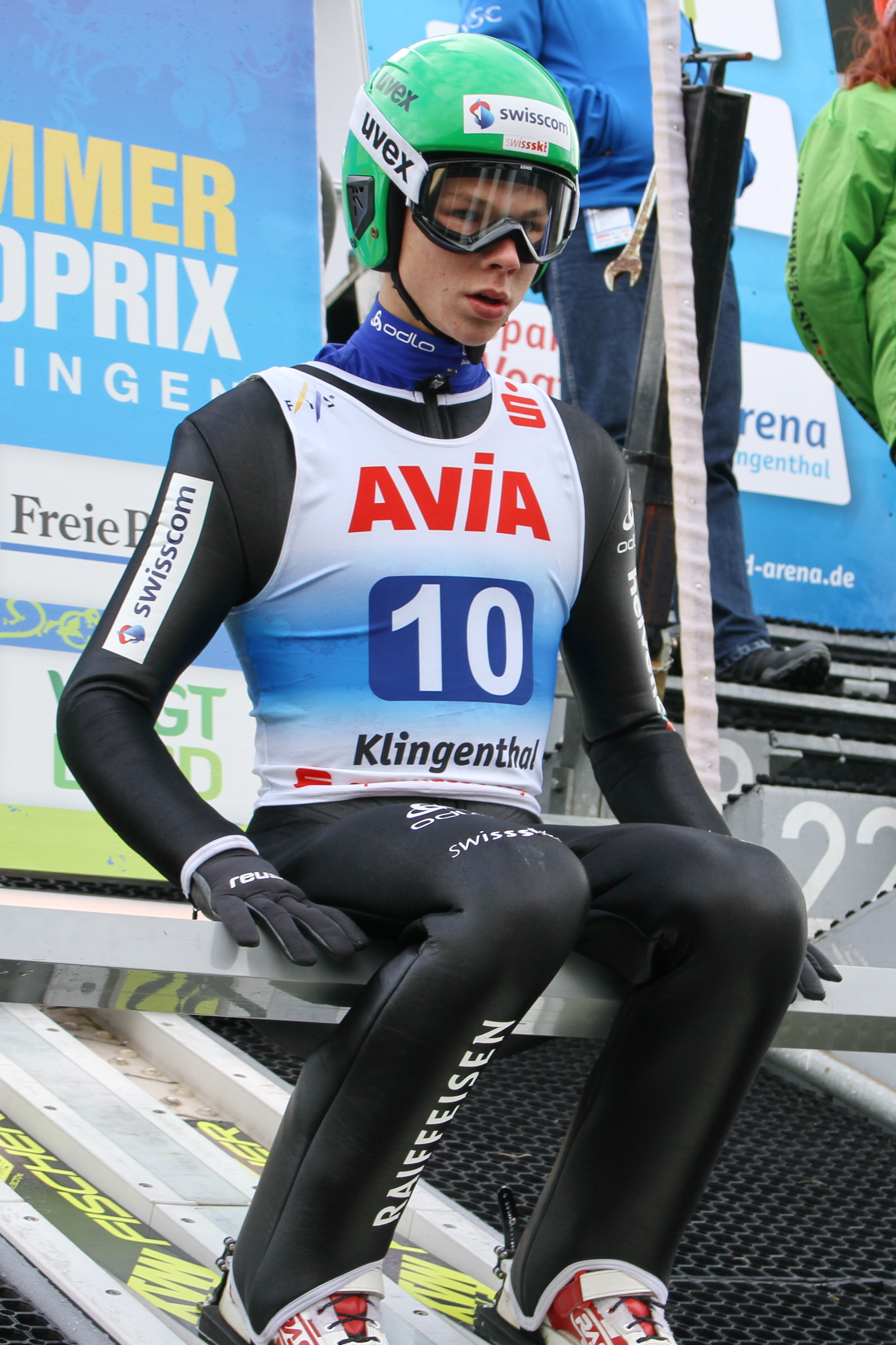
FIS Ski Jumping Summer Grand Prix Klingenthal 2017 on 3 October 2017: Andreas Schuler

Andreas Schuler (born 30 December 1995 in Switzerland) is a Swiss ski jumper who competes for his home nation in the FIS Ski Jumping World Cup. At the Swiss Ski Jumping Championships in 2013 in Chaux-Neuven together with his teammates Pascal Sommer, Tobias Birchier and Pascal Kalin they took the title.

Schuler set the summer hill record for the large KBT hill at Schanzen Einsiedeln with a jump of 50.0 meters.

On 8 August 2015 Schuler placed 8th at the FIS World Cup event in Kuopio, Finland and on 7 February 2016 placed 12th at the FIS World Cup event at Villach, Austria.
