= Aleksandr Trofimov (footballer) =

Soviet Azerbaijani footballer (1937-2002)

Personal information
- Full name: Aleksandr Mihaylovich Trofimov
- Date of birth: 11 September 1937
- Place of birth: Baku, Azerbaijan SSR, Soviet Union
- Date of death: 5 September 2002 (aged 64)
- Place of death: Lipetsk, Russia
- Height: 1.72 m (5 ft 8 in)
- Position: Midfielder

Youth career
- Trudovye Reservy Lipetsk

Senior career*
Years	Team	Apps	(Gls)
1957–1960	Trudovye Reservy Lipetsk		
1961–1969	Neftchi Baku	257	(9)

Managerial career
- 1973–1974: Neftchi Baku (assistant)
- 1977: Araz Nakhchivan (assistant)
- 1978: Karabakh Stepanakert (assistant)
- 1987: Avtomobilist Mingechevir
- 1992: Plastik Salyan FK
- * Club domestic league appearances and goals

Aleksandr Mihaylovich Trofimov (Russian: Александр Михайлович Трофимов; 11 September 1937 – 6 September 2002) was a Soviet and Azerbaijani footballer who played midfield for 11 years for Neftchi Baku PFC. Trofimov later coached Neftchi and Araz Nakhchivan in the 1970s.

== Biography ==
Born in Baku, Azerbaijan SSR, Trofimov began playing professional football with FC Trudovye Reservy Lipetsk in the Soviet Second League and the Soviet First League from 1957 to 1960.

He was classified as a Master of Sport of the USSR in 1963 and was a member of the Neftchi squad that finished third in the Soviet Top League in 1966.

After he retired from playing, Trofimov coached his former club Neftchi before becoming a manager. He led Avtomobilist Mingechevir in the Soviet Second League during 1987 and Plastik Salyan FK in the Azerbaijan Top League during 1992.

He would return to Lipetsk, where he worked with a local club FC Spartak Kazinka before he died in 2002.
