= Toomas Tiru =

Estonian Nordic combined skier

Personal information
- Nationality: Estonian
- Born: 18 January 1969 (age 57) Viljandi, then part of Estonian SSR, Soviet Union

Sport
- Sport: Nordic combined

Toomas Tiru (born 18 January 1969) is an Estonian skier. He competed in the Nordic combined event at the 1992 Winter Olympics.
