= Sergei Trofimov =

Russian singer (born 1966)

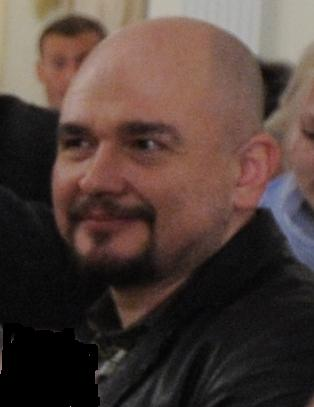
- Born: Sergei Vyacheslavovich Trofimov; 4 November 1966; Moscow, Russian SFSR, Soviet Union
- Occupations: Poet; singer-songwriter; actor; guitarist; composer
- Years active: 1987–present
- Musical career
- Genres: Bard; Russian chanson; Rock
- Instruments: Vocals; Guitar; Piano

Sergei Vyacheslavovich Trofimov (Russian: Серге́й Вячесла́вович Трофи́мов, born November 4, 1966), also known under the stage name Trofim, is a Russian songwriter, musician, singer.

Honored Artist of the Russian Federation (2011). Winner of the Chanson of the Year and the Golden Gramophone awards.

== Biography ==
Sergei Trofimov was born on November 4, 1966, in Moscow to Galina Fedorovna and Vyacheslav Vladimirovich. The parents divorced three years after the birth of their son.

From 1973 until 1983 Trofimov was a chorister at the Moscow State Capella at the Gnessin School. After receiving the diploma of secondary education, Sergei entered the Moscow State Art and Cultural University and the Moscow Conservatory, specializing in theory and composition. At the age of 19 Sergei participated in the 12th World Festival of Youth and Students, which was held in 1985 in the capital of the USSR, where he received a diploma. Due to financial difficulties Sergei Trofimov worked as a musician at a restaurant.

At 21, Trofimov began his creative career, composing and performing songs in the style of rock ballads. Sergei became member of the rock band "Eroplan". From 1991 until 1993 he served as a chorister in the choir at a church in Moscow. In 1992, Sergei began working on songs for Svetlana Vladimirskaya's album "My Boy".

Sergei's concert activity began in 1994. Initially, Trofimov came forward as the author of musical compositions for Alexander Ivanov's disk "Sinful Soul of Sorrow". For solo work, Sergei chose the creative pseudonym "Trofim". The first albums of the singer "Aristocracy of the Garbage Dump 1" and "Aristocracy of the Garbage Dump 2" were produced by Stepan Razin.

In 2008 Trofimov acted in the television series Platina.

== Personal life ==
The first wife of Sergei Trofimov was Natasha Gerasimova with whom they had one daughter, Anna, born in 1988. They were married twice.

In early 2003, Sergei met Laima Vaikule's backup dancer Anastasia Nikishina with whom he began romantic relations. Anastasia gave birth to a son, and when he turned 1.5 years old, the parents got married. Sergei and Anastasia welcomed another child, daughter Liza in 2008.

== Political views ==
On February 6, 2012, Trofimov was officially registered as a confidant of the candidate for the President of the Russian Federation and, now the President of the Russian Federation, Vladimir Putin.

March 11, 2014 signed an appeal of cultural figures of the Russian Federation in support of the policy of President Vladimir V. Putin in Ukraine and Crimea.

== Discography ==
- 1995: Aristocracy of the Garbage Dump-1
- 1996: Aristocracy of the Garbage Dump-2
- 1996: Oh, I would live
- 1998: Aristocracy of the Garbage Dump-3: Devaluation
- 1998: News from the thorny faraway (folk songs)
- 2000: I'm born again
- 2000: War and Peace
- 2001: Aristocracy of the Garbage Dump-4: The Basic Instinct
- 2002: The Bard Vanguard
- 2004: Wind in the head
- 2005: Nostalgia
- 2007: Next stop
- 2009: I live in Russia
- 2010: Everything is not important
- 2011: The Fortyfiver
- 2012: One-Two
- 2014: Black and White
- 2017: In the middle
