= Uno Kajak =

Estonian Nordic combined skier (1933–2019)

Personal information
- Nationality: Estonian
- Born: 9 May 1933; Tartu, Estonia
- Died: 10 August 2019 (aged 86); Tallinn, Estonia

Sport
- Sport: Nordic combined

Uno Kajak (9 May 1933 – 10 August 2019) was an Estonian skier. He competed in the Nordic combined event at the 1956 Winter Olympics.

Kajak graduated in 1948 from Rakvere Elementary School No. 2. In 1956 he graduated from Tartu State University (now the University of Tartu), having studied physical education.
