= Tambet Pikkor =

Estonian ski jumper

Personal information
- Nationality: Estonian
- Born: 17 April 1980 (age 44); Tallinn, Estonia

Sport
- Sport: Ski jumping

Tambet Pikkor (born 17 April 1980) is an Estonian ski jumper. He competed at the 1998 Winter Olympics, the 2002 Winter Olympics, and the 2006 Winter Olympics.
