= Kaarel Nurmsalu =

Estonian Nordic combined racer and ski jumper

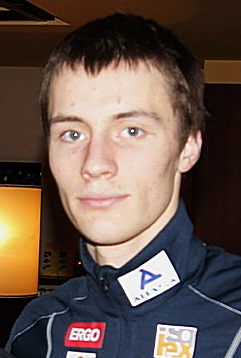

Personal information
- Full name: Kaarel Nurmsalu
- Nickname: Karla
- Born: 30 April 1991 (age 35) Rakvere, Estonia
- Height: 1.83 m (6 ft 0 in)
- Weight: 68 kg (150 lb)

Sport
- Sport: Ski jumping
- Club: Skiclub Telemark

World Cup career
- Seasons: 2011–2014, 2017

Achievements and titles
- Personal bests: 223 m (Planica 2008)
Medal record
Men's ski jumping
Representing Estonia
FIS Junior World Ski Championships
| Bronze medal – third place | 2011 Otepää | Individual normal hill |
Men's Nordic combined
Representing Estonia
FIS Junior World Ski Championships
| Bronze medal – third place | 2011 Otepää | 5km individual normal hill |
| Bronze medal – third place | 2011 Otepää | 10km individual normal hill |
- Updated on 28 February 2012

Kaarel Nurmsalu (born April 30, 1991) is an Estonian former ski jumper and Nordic combined skier who competed at the 2014 Winter Olympics for Estonia in the ski jumping competition.

He won 3 individual bronze medals at the 2011 Nordic Junior World Ski Championships in Otepää.

He holds the Estonian national record in ski-flying with 213 m.

== Retirement ==
In June 2014, Nurmsalu announced his retirement from competitive sports, citing lack of funds as the reason behind the decision.

On 11 January 2017, Nurmsalu announced on his Facebook page that he would be returning to active competition starting with the World Cup event in Wisła on 13 January 2017. However, health issues prompted him to end his career for a second time in June 2017.
