= Roman Trofimov =

Russian ski jumper (born 1989)

Roman Sergeevich Trofimov
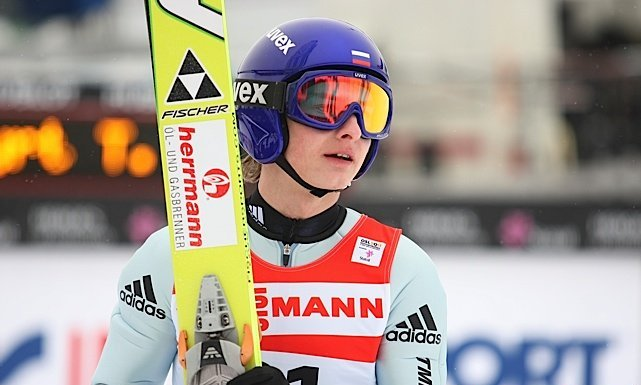
- Trofimov in 2011

Personal information
- Full name: Roman Sergeevich Trofimov
- Nationality: Russia
- Born: November 19, 1989 (age 36) Leninogorsk, Russia
- Height: 170 cm (5 ft 7 in)

Sport
- Sport: Skiing
- Club: Moskva WVSM

World Cup career
- Seasons: 2008-
- Indiv. podiums: 0
- Indiv. wins: 0

Achievements and titles
- Personal best: 184,5 m

Roman Sergeevich Trofimov (Russian: Ро́ман Серге́евич Трофи́мов; born November 19, 1989) is a Russian ski jumper competing for Moskva WVSM. His first World Cup competition took place in Willingen, Germany in 2010, although he had previously competed in qualifying rounds without qualifying. He was 48th in the competition.

== Career ==
He started his elite career in Bischofshofen in 2007 by competing in a Fis Cup-competition. Shortly after, he advanced to the Continental Cup. His best finish in the Continental Cup is 2nd place from Liberec 2008.

2008-09 Trofimov competed in some World Cup qualifications and the Summer Grand Prix (Summer World Cup) and finished 39th as best.

2009-10 Trofimov advanced into the Russian World Cup team and competed in Willingen and Klingenthal. Trofimov also competed in the FIS Ski-Flying World Championships 2010 in Planica, Slovenia. He finished 38th in the individual competition, and his Russian team finished 9th in the Team competition. This season he also won the Russian championships i Mezhdurechensk. Both Normal Hill and Large Hill.

Name controversy

Trofimov had been continuously referred to as "Roman Sergeevich Trofimov" in the past until that mistake was taken into account by FIS officials. "Sergeevich" is a Russian variety of a patronym - an indication of his father's first name (Sergey), somewhat similar to Icelandic patronyms, erroneously regarded by many as last names. Patronyms are mostly kept for strictly official use or for addressing an elderly person as a mark of respect. They are never used for referring to a person as young as Trofimov, be it in everyday speech or TV sports commentary. Therefore, constant mention of Trofimov's patronym by foreign sports commentators or officials compiling starting lists used to provide comic effect with Russian TV audiences, as well as serve as a source of inside jokes in the Russian ski jumping squad. The misunderstanding stemmed from the fact that a fairly unknown Soviet ski jumper, also named Roman Trofimov, existed who used to compete a few decades ago. Roman Trofimov was hence registered in the FIS database with an extra "indicator", in this case, his patronym, so as to avoid confusion with the long-retired Soviet athlete.
