= Jens Salumäe =

Estonian Nordic combined skier and ski jumper (born 1981)

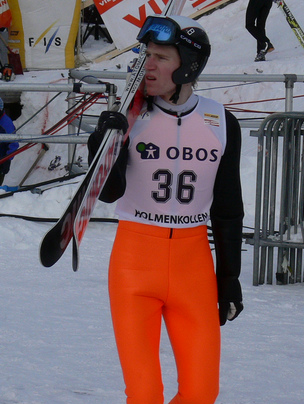
- Salumäe in 2006

Personal information
- Born: 15 March 1981 (age 45) Tallinn, Estonia
- Height: 5 ft 9 in (175 cm)

Sport
- Sport: Ski jumping
- Club: Puijon Hihtoseura

World Cup career
- Seasons: 2002–2007

Achievements and titles
- Personal best: 197 m
- Updated on 13 January 2012

Jens Salumäe (born 15 March 1981) is an Estonian former ski jumper and Nordic combined skier who has been competing since 2002. He finished 23rd in the individual large hill event at the 2006 Winter Olympics in Turin.

Salumäe finished 37th in the individual normal hill event at the 2005 FIS Nordic World Ski Championships in Oberstdorf. He finished 25th in the individual event at the 2004 Ski-flying World Championships in Planica.

Salumäe's best individual World Cup finish was 21 in a large hill event in Kuusamo, Finland in 2003. His best individual career finish was eighth in a Continental Cup large hill event in Germany in 2005.

He held the Estonian record with 197 metres.
