= Martti Nõmme =

Estonian ski jumper

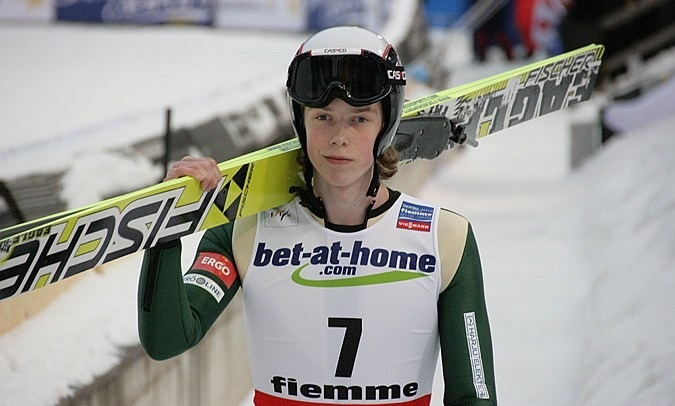

Personal information
- Full name: Martti Nõmme
- Born: 7 August 1993 (age 32) Võru, Estonia

Sport
- Sport: Skiing
- Club: Võru Sportschool

World Cup career
- Seasons: -

Martti Nõmme (Estonian pronunciation: [ˈmɑrt::i ˈnɤmme], born 7 August 1993) is an Estonian ski jumper. He was born in Võru.

He competed in the 2015 World Cup season.

He competed at the FIS Nordic World Ski Championships 2013 in Val di Fiemme, and represented Estonia at the FIS Nordic World Ski Championships 2015 in Falun.

He represented Estonia at the 2018 Winter Olympics.
