= Antti Aalto (ski jumper) =

Finnish ski jumper (born 1995)

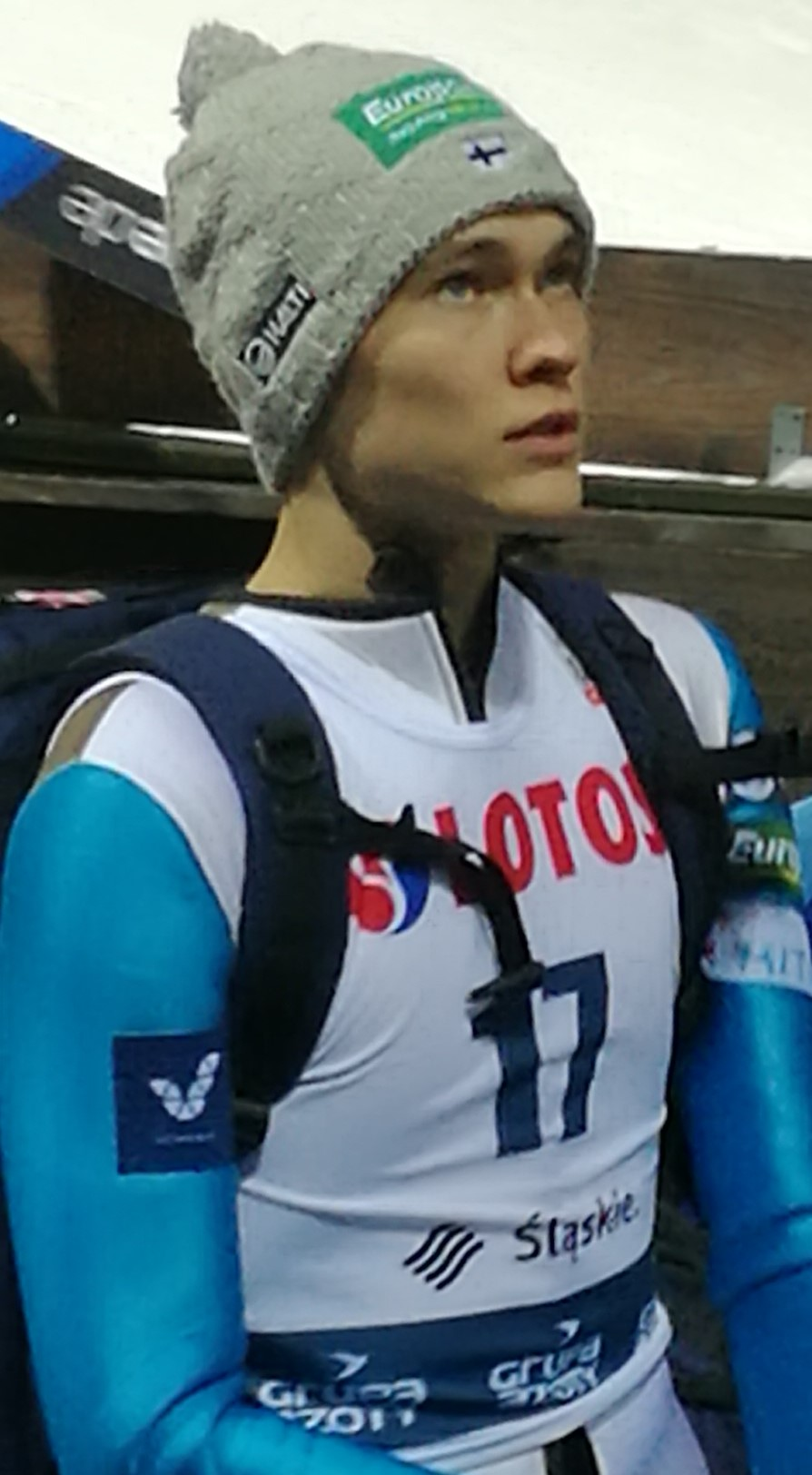
- Antti Aalto in 2017.

Personal information
- Nationality: Finland
- Born: 2 April 1995 (age 31) Kitee, Finland
- Height: 1.85 m (6 ft 1 in)

Sport
- Sport: Skiing
- Club: Kiteen Urheilijat

World Cup career
- Seasons: 2013; 2015–present
- Indiv. starts: 171
- Team starts: 37

Achievements and titles
- Personal bests: 230.5 m (756 ft); Planica, 30 March 2025
- Updated on 2 April 2025

Antti Aalto (born 2 April 1995) is a Finnish ski jumper. He competed in two events at the 2018 Winter Olympics. His best ever result in a World Cup competition is third which he reached in Oslo in 2026.

== Ski jumping career ==
Aalto was seventh in the Qualification at the season opener in Wisla. He finished 9th together with the Finnish team in the team competition. On the following day, Aalto was sitting in fifth place after the first round. He lost two positions in the final round, meaning he finished seventh, which was his best ever World Cup result.

In the 2024/25 season he had two 11th-place finishes one in Ruka and other in Lahti, and also he managed to set a new personal best in Planica.

== World Cup ==
=== Standings ===
Season	Overall	4H	SF	RA	W6	T5	P7	NT
2012/13	—	—	—	N/A	N/A	N/A	N/A	N/A
2013/14	—	—	—	N/A	N/A	N/A	N/A	N/A
2014/15	—	—	—	N/A	N/A	N/A	N/A	N/A
2015/16	—	—	—	N/A	N/A	N/A	N/A	N/A
2016/17	—	53	—	42	N/A	N/A	N/A	N/A
2017/18	54	57	—	53	33	N/A	63	N/A
2018/19	25	30	30	20	23	N/A	23	N/A
2019/20	32	39	7	29	27	28	N/A	N/A
2020/21	37	15	—	N/A	36	N/A	37	N/A
2021/22					N/A	N/A		N/A

=== Individual starts (88) ===
Season	1	2	3	4	5	6	7	8	9	10	11	12	13	14	15	16	17	18	19	20	21	22	23	24	25	26	27	28	29	30	31	Points
2012/13																																0
2012/13	–	–	q	–	–	–	–	–	–	–	–	–	–	–	–	–	–	–	–	–	–	–	–	–	–	–	–					0
2014/15																																0
2014/15	–	q	q	–	–	–	–	–	–	–	–	–	–	–	–	–	–	–	–	–	–	–	–	–	–	–	–	–	–	–	–	0
2015/16																																0
2015/16	–	–	–	–	–	–	–	–	–	–	–	–	–	q	48	–	–	–	–	–	q	–	–	–	–	–	–	–	–			0
2016/17																																0
2016/17	–	–	–	–	–	–	–	q	35	q	q	45	35	q	46	–	–	–	–	–	–	32	36	q	36	–						0
2017/18																																13
2017/18	28	26	36	34	42	32	30	40	49	q	q	–	–	27	37	42	q	q	40	40	q	–										13
2018/19	Wisła	Kuusamo	Kuusamo	Nizhny Tagil	Nizhny Tagil	Engelberg	Engelberg	Oberstdorf	Garmisch-Partenkirchen	Innsbruck	Bischofshofen	Val di Fiemme	Val di Fiemme	Zakopane	Sapporo	Sapporo	Oberstdorf	Oberstdorf	Oberstdorf	Lahti	Willingen	Willingen	Oslo	Lillehammer	Trondheim	Vikersund	Planica	Planica				288
2018/19	7	32	33	12	6	15	10	22	36	41	20	23	23	18	–	–	40	40	20	9	18	25	18	25	29	18	34	25				288
2019/20	Wisła	Kuusamo	Nizhny Tagil	Nizhny Tagil	Klingenthal	Engelberg	Engelberg	Oberstdorf	Garmisch-Partenkirchen	Innsbruck	Bischofshofen	Val di Fiemme	Val di Fiemme	Titisee-Neustadt	Titisee-Neustadt	Zakopane	Sapporo	Sapporo	Willingen	Tauplitz	Tauplitz	Râșnov	Râșnov	Lahti	Lahti	Oslo	Lillehammer					133
2019/20	–	40	34	33	23	47	46	37	q	24	34	–	–	31	21	27	43	26	27	6	11	19	26	44	52	26	22					133
2020/21	Wisła	Ruka	Ruka	Nizhny Tagil	Nizhny Tagil	Engelberg	Engelberg	Oberstdorf	Garmisch-Partenkirchen	Innsbruck	Bischofshofen	Titisee-Neustadt	Titisee-Neustadt	Zakopane	Lahti	Willingen	Willingen	Klingenthal	Klingenthal	Zakopane	Zakopane	Râșnov	Planica	Planica	Planica							90
2020/21	–	20	36	–	–	20	23	23	25	27	19	21	33	19	36	36	46	23	41	–	–	–	q	56	–							90
2021/22	Nizhny Tagil	Nizhny Tagil	Ruka	Ruka	Wisła	Klingenthal	Klingenthal	Engelberg	Engelberg	Oberstdorf	Garmisch-Partenkirchen	Innsbruck	Bischofshofen	Bischofshofen	Zakopane	Sapporo	Sapporo	Sapporo	Willingen	Willingen	Lahti	Lillehammer	Oslo	Oslo	Oberstdorf	Oberstdorf	Planica	Planica				0
2021/22	q	q																														0
