= Kevin Maltsev =

Estonian ski jumper (born 2000)

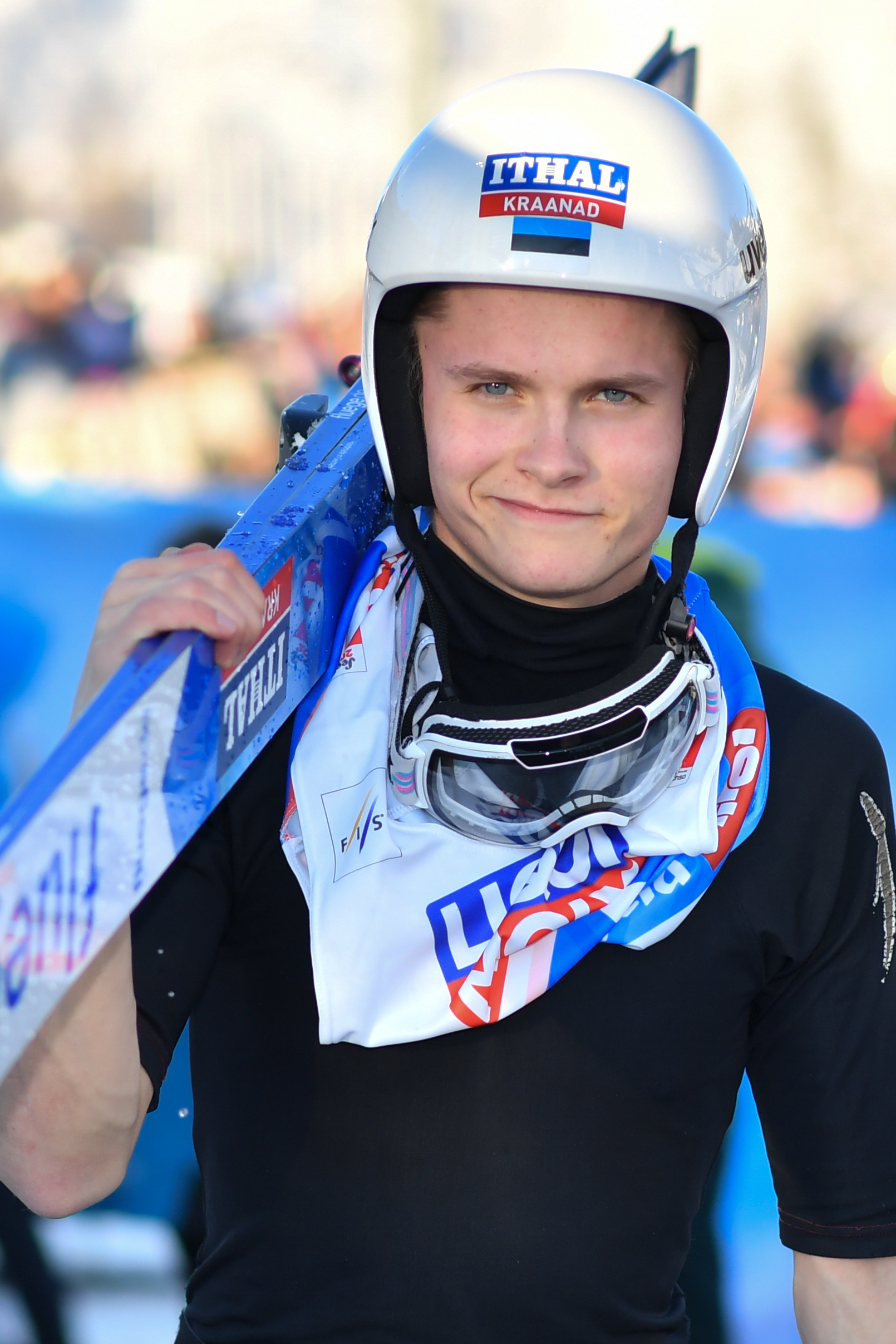
- Kevin Maltsev in 2019

Personal information
- Nationality: Estonian
- Born: 4 July 2000 (age 24); Elva, Estonia

Sport
- Sport: Ski jumping

Kevin Maltsev (born 4 July 2000) is an Estonian ski jumper. He competed in two events at the 2018 Winter Olympics. He competed at the 2022 Winter Olympics.
