= Casey Larson =

American ski jumper (born 1998)

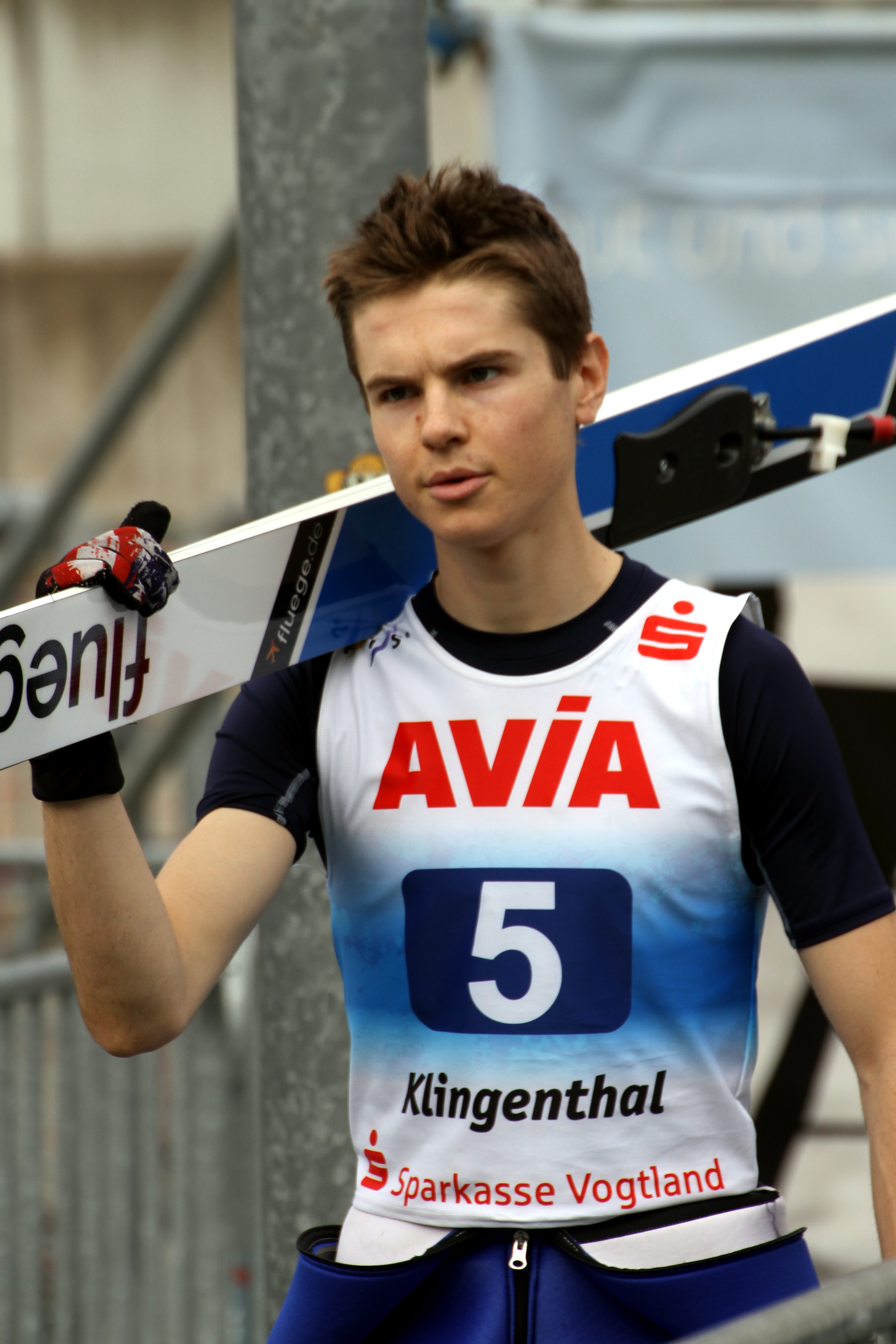
- Larson in 2017

Personal information
- Born: December 16, 1998 (age 27) Barrington, Illinois, U.S.

Sport
- Sport: Ski jumping

World Cup career
- Seasons: 2017–2025
- Indiv. starts: 52
- Team starts: 19

Achievements and titles
- Personal bests: 216.5 m (710 ft); Vikersund, March 18, 2017

Casey Larson (born December 16, 1998) is a retired American ski jumper. According to historian Bill Mallon, he was the 100,000th Olympic male athlete to compete in the Olympic Games (across Summer and Winter Games).

== Career ==
In 2016, Larson participated at the Winter Youth Olympics in Lillehammer and the Junior World Championships in Rasnov.

He was one of three Chicago-area teens to make the 2018 Olympics ski jumping team, where he finished in 39th place in the normal hill individual event. He also competed at the 2022 Winter Olympics, finishing in 39th place on the normal hill and in 43rd place on the large hill.

== Major tournament results ==
=== Winter Olympics ===
Year	Place	Individual		Team	
Year	Place	Normal	Large	Men	Mixed
2018	(South Korea) Pyeongchang	39	—	9	—
2022	(China) Beijing	39	43	10	—

=== FIS Nordic World Ski Championships ===
Year	Place	Individual		Team	
Year	Place	Normal	Large	Men	Mixed
2017	(Finland) Lahti	—	46	11	—
2019	(Austria) Innsbruck	28	38	11	10
2021	(Germany) Oberstdorf	46	48	10	12
2023	(Slovenia) Planica	39	36	8	10
2025	(Norway) Trondheim	40	—	—	—

=== FIS Ski Flying World Championships ===
Year	Place	Individual	Team
2020	(Slovenia) Planica	39	—
2022	(Norway) Vikersund	40	—
2024	(Austria) Bad Mitterndorf	did not participate	

== World Cup results ==
=== Standings ===
Season	Overall	4H	SF	RA
2016–17	—	—	—	55
2017–18	—	—	—	—
2018–19	—	—	—	66
2019–20	—	—	—	—
2020–21	71	71	—	N/A
2021–22	—	—	—	50
2022–23	66	—	—	40
2023–24	—	—	—	—
2024–25	—	54	—	—

=== Individual starts ===
winner (1); second (2); third (3); did not compete (–); failed to qualify (q); disqualified (DQ)
Season	1	2	3	4	5	6	7	8	9	10	11	12	13	14	15	16	17	18	19	20	21	22	23	24	25	26	27	28	29	30	31	32	Points
2016–17	Kuusamo	Kuusamo	Klingenthal	Lillehammer	Lillehammer	Engelberg	Engelberg	Oberstdorf	Garmisch-Partenkirchen	Innsbruck	Bischofshofen	Wisła	Wisła	Zakopane	Willingen	Oberstdorf	Oberstdorf	Sapporo	Sapporo	Pyeongchang	Pyeongchang	Oslo	Trondheim	Vikersund	Planica	Planica							0
2016–17	–	–	–	–	–	–	–	–	–	–	–	–	–	q	–	–	–	–	–	–	–	DQ	48	q	q	–							0
2017–18	Wisła	Kuusamo	Nizhny Tagil	Nizhny Tagil	Titisee-Neustadt	Engelberg	Engelberg	Oberstdorf	Garmisch-Partenkirchen	Innsbruck	Bischofshofen	Tauplitz	Zakopane	Willingen	Willingen	Lahti	Oslo	Lillehammer	Trondheim	Vikersund	Planica	Planica											0
2017–18	–	–	–	–	–	–	–	–	–	–	–	–	–	–	–	q	–	–	–	–	q	–											0
2018–19	Wisła	Kuusamo	Kuusamo	Nizhny Tagil	Nizhny Tagil	Engelberg	Engelberg	Oberstdorf	Garmisch-Partenkirchen	Innsbruck	Bischofshofen	Val di Fiemme	Val di Fiemme	Zakopane	Sapporo	Sapporo	Oberstdorf	Oberstdorf	Oberstdorf	Lahti	Willingen	Willingen	Oslo	Lillehammer	Trondheim	Vikersund	Planica	Planica					0
2018–19	–	–	–	–	–	–	–	–	q	q	–	–	–	–	40	44	q	q	q	–	–	–	q	q	q	q	q	–					0
2019–20	Wisła	Kuusamo	Nizhny Tagil	Nizhny Tagil	Klingenthal	Engelberg	Engelberg	Oberstdorf	Garmisch-Partenkirchen	Innsbruck	Bischofshofen	Val di Fiemme	Val di Fiemme	Titisee-Neustadt	Titisee-Neustadt	Zakopane	Sapporo	Sapporo	Willingen	Tauplitz	Tauplitz	Râșnov	Râșnov	Lahti	Lahti	Oslo	Lillehammer						0
2019–20	–	q	–	–	–	–	–	q	q	–	–	–	–	–	–	–	–	–	–	–	–	–	–	–	–	–	–						0
2020–21	Wisła	Ruka	Ruka	Nizhny Tagil	Nizhny Tagil	Engelberg	Engelberg	Oberstdorf	Garmisch-Partenkirchen	Innsbruck	Bischofshofen	Titisee-Neustadt	Titisee-Neustadt	Zakopane	Lahti	Willingen	Willingen	Klingenthal	Klingenthal	Szczyrk	Szczyrk	Râșnov	Planica	Planica	Planica								3
2020–21	q	q	28	–	–	48	q	62	q	–	–	–	–	50	50	–	–	–	–	–	–	–	q	66	–								3
2021–22	Nizhny Tagil	Nizhny Tagil	Ruka	Ruka	Wisła	Klingenthal	Klingenthal	Engelberg	Engelberg	Oberstdorf	Garmisch-Partenkirchen	Bischofshofen	Bischofshofen	Bischofshofen	Zakopane	Titisee-Neustadt	Titisee-Neustadt	Willingen	Willingen	Lahti	Lahti	Lillehammer	Oslo	Oslo	Oberstdorf	Oberstdorf	Planica	Planica					0
2021–22	–	–	q	q	q	–	–	–	–	q	q	q	q	q	–	–	–	–	–	57	48	q	48	DQ	q	q	q	–					0
2022–23	Wisła	Wisła	Kuusamo	Kuusamo	Titisee-Neustadt	Titisee-Neustadt	Engelberg	Engelberg	Oberstdorf	Garmisch-Partenkirchen	Innsbruck	Bischofshofen	Zakopane	Sapporo	Sapporo	Sapporo	Tauplitz	Tauplitz	Willingen	Willingen	Lake Placid	Lake Placid	Râșnov	Oslo	Oslo	Lillehammer	Lillehammer	Vikersund	Vikersund	Lahti	Planica	Planica	13
2022–23	–	–	q	46	q	q	–	–	–	–	–	–	36	q	38	46	q	q	q	35	35	34	18	32	47	q	35	q	39	42	q	–	13
