= Artti Aigro =

Estonian ski jumper (born 1999)

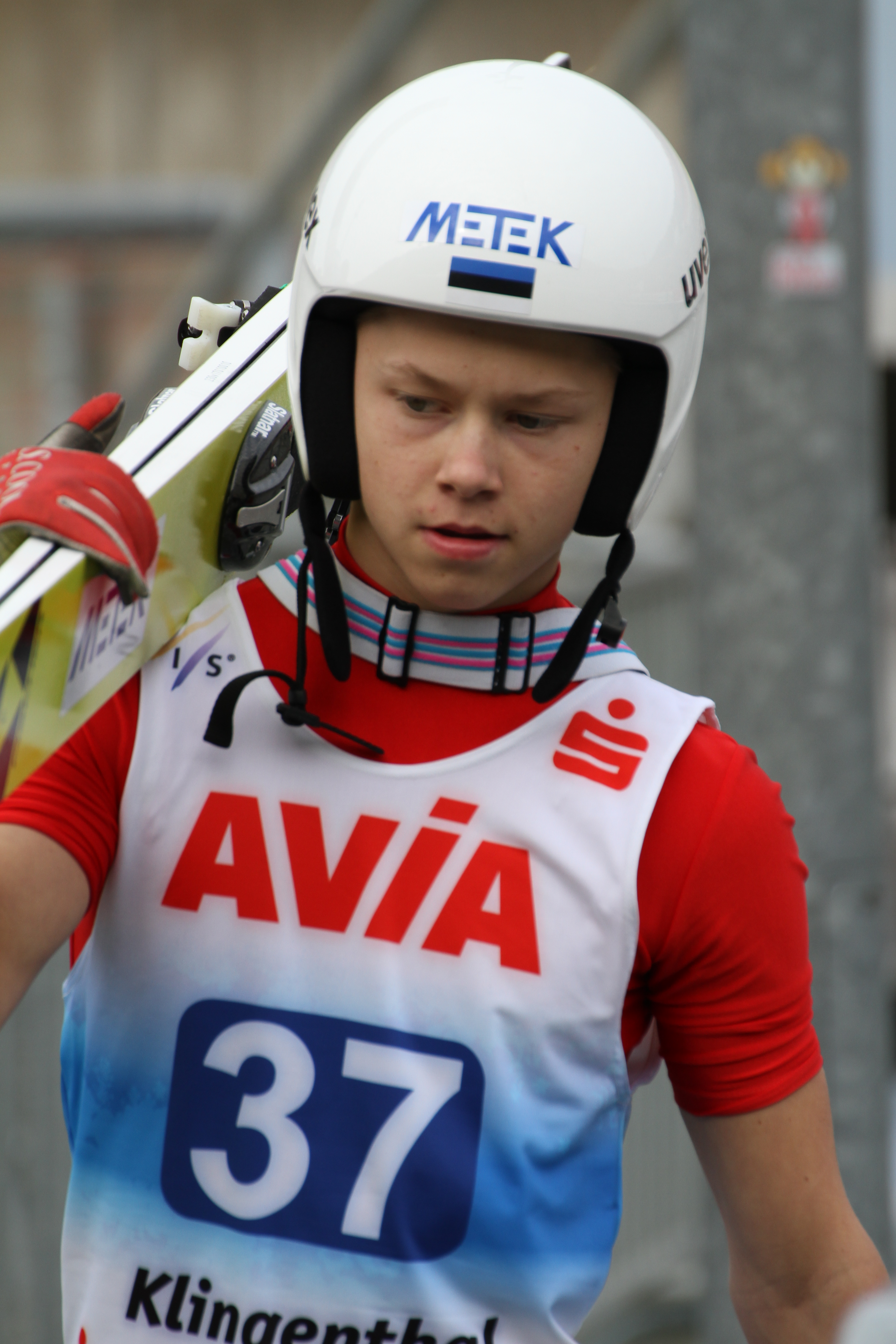
- Aigro in 2017

Personal information
- Nationality: Estonia
- Born: 29 August 1999 (age 27) Otepää, Estonia

Sport
- Sport: Skiing
- Club: Otepää SK

World Cup career
- Seasons: 2017–present
- Indiv. starts: 98

Achievements and titles
- Personal bests: 228 m (748 ft); Planica, 22 March 2019
- Updated on 24 March 2024

Artti Aigro (born 29 August 1999) is an Estonian ski jumper. He represented Estonia at the 2018, 2022, and 2026 Winter Olympics.

Aigro is the Estonian record holder in the men's longest ski jump (228 m).

== Major tournament results ==
=== Winter Olympics ===
Year	Place	Individual		Team	
Year	Place	Normal	Large	Men	Mixed
2018	(South Korea) Pyeongchang	q	48	—	—
2022	(China) Beijing	34	30	—	—
2026	(Italy) Milan and Cortina d'Ampezzo	DNS	26	13	—

=== FIS Nordic World Ski Championships ===
Year	Place	Individual		Team	
Year	Place	Normal	Large	Men	Mixed
2019	(Austria) Seefeld	49	q	—	—
2021	(Germany) Oberstdorf	41	25	—	—
2023	(Slovenia) Planica	31	25	—	—
2025	(Norway) Trondheim	24	18	—	—

=== FIS Ski Flying World Championships ===
Year	Place	Individual	Team
2020	(Slovenia) Planica	25	—
2022	(Norway) Vikersund	19	—
2024	(Austria) Bad Mitterndorf	25	—

== World Cup ==
=== Standings ===
Season	Overall	4H	SF	RA	W6	T5	P7
2017/18	—	—	—	—	—	N/A	21
2018/19	57	—	—	67	—	N/A	30
2019/20	57	—	31	53	—	—	N/A
2020/21	43	43	24	N/A	50	N/A	46
2021/22	55	46	29	40	N/A	N/A	38
2022/23	49	37	42	49	N/A	N/A	44
2023/24	43	—	37	43	N/A	N/A	34
2024/25	21	30	—	—	N/A	N/A	—

=== Individual starts (98) ===
Season	1	2	3	4	5	6	7	8	9	10	11	12	13	14	15	16	17	18	19	20	21	22	23	24	25	26	27	28	29	30	31	32	Points
2017/18	Wisła	Kuusamo	Nizhny Tagil	Nizhny Tagil	Titisee-Neustadt	Engelberg	Engelberg	Oberstdorf	Garmisch-Partenkirchen	Innsbruck	Bischofshofen	Tauplitz	Zakopane	Willingen	Willingen	Lahti	Oslo	Lillehammer	Trondheim	Vikersund	Planica	Planica											0
2017/18	q	–	–	–	50	–	–	q	q	q	q	–	q	–	–	–	–	–	–	–	q	–											0
2018/19	Wisła	Kuusamo	Kuusamo	Nizhny Tagil	Nizhny Tagil	Engelberg	Engelberg	Oberstdorf	Garmisch-Partenkirchen	Innsbruck	Bischofshofen	Val di Fiemme	Val di Fiemme	Zakopane	Sapporo	Sapporo	Oberstdorf	Oberstdorf	Oberstdorf	Lahti	Willingen	Willingen	Oslo	Lillehammer	Trondheim	Vikersund	Planica	Planica					12
2018/19	–	39	19	–	–	–	–	–	–	–	–	–	–	–	–	–	–	–	–	–	–	–	q	q	q	q	q	–					12
2019/20	Wisła	Kuusamo	Nizhny Tagil	Nizhny Tagil	Klingenthal	Engelberg	Engelberg	Oberstdorf	Garmisch-Partenkirchen	Innsbruck	Bischofshofen	Val di Fiemme	Val di Fiemme	Titisee-Neustadt	Titisee-Neustadt	Zakopane	Sapporo	Sapporo	Willingen	Tauplitz	Tauplitz	Râșnov	Râșnov	Lahti	Lahti	Oslo	Lillehammer						11
2019/20	–	38	–	–	–	–	–	q	q	q	q	–	–	–	–	q	25	38	q	26	33	–	–	q	53	q	35						11
2020/21	Wisła	Ruka	Ruka	Nizhny Tagil	Nizhny Tagil	Engelberg	Engelberg	Oberstdorf	Garmisch-Partenkirchen	Innsbruck	Bischofshofen	Titisee-Neustadt	Titisee-Neustadt	Zakopane	Lahti	Willingen	Willingen	Klingenthal	Klingenthal	Szczyrk	Szczyrk	Râșnov	Planica	Planica	Planica								63
2020/21	26	14	30	–	–	41	28	40	38	40	45	24	38	42	38	DQ	20	33	45	–	–	–	21	23	–								63
2021/22	Nizhny Tagil	Nizhny Tagil	Ruka	Ruka	Wisła	Klingenthal	Klingenthal	Engelberg	Engelberg	Oberstdorf	Garmisch-Partenkirchen	Bischofshofen	Bischofshofen	Bischofshofen	Zakopane	Titisee-Neustadt	Titisee-Neustadt	Willingen	Willingen	Lahti	Lahti	Lillehammer	Oslo	Oslo	Oberstdorf	Oberstdorf	Planica	Planica					30
2021/22	37	46	q	18	34	47	37	q	q	42	50	44	41	43	–	34	39	–	–	30	45	31	39	32	q	23	23	–					30
2022/23	Wisła	Wisła	Ruka	Ruka	Titisee-Neustadt	Titisee-Neustadt	Engelberg	Engelberg	Oberstdorf	Garmisch-Partenkirchen	Innsbruck	Bischofshofen	Zakopane	Sapporo	Sapporo	Sapporo	Bad Mitterndorf	Bad Mitterndorf	Willingen	Willingen	Lake Placid, New York	Lake Placid, New York	Râșnov	Oslo	Oslo	Lillehammer	Lillehammer	Vikersund	Vikersund	Lahti	Planica	Planica	33
2022/23	26	42	45	q	31	46	–	–	42	37	29	48	–	46	24	50	q	31	29	37	27	37	–	49	44	DQ	–	–	q	22	27	–	33
2023/24	Ruka	Ruka	Lillehammer	Lillehammer	Klingenthal	Klingenthal	Engelberg	Engelberg	Oberstdorf	Garmisch-Partenkirchen	Innsbruck	Bischofshofen	Wisła	Zakopane	Willingen	Willingen	Lake Placid, New York	Lake Placid, New York	Sapporo	Sapporo	Oberstdorf	Oberstdorf	Lahti	Lahti	Oslo	Oslo	Trondheim	Trondheim	Vikersund	Vikersund	Planica	Planica	66
2023/24	48	25	38	39	33	30	29	32	45	40	21	DQ	27	35	18	29	–	–	18	30	28	28	39	26	q	45	41	42	32	–	28	–	66
2024/25	Lillehammer HS140	Lillehammer HS140	Kuusamo HS142	Kuusamo HS142	Wisła HS134	Wisła HS134	Titisee-Neustadt HS142	Titisee-Neustadt HS142	Engelberg HS140	Engelberg HS140	Oberstdorf HS137	Garmisch-Partenkirchen HS142	Innsbruck HS130	Bischofshofen HS142	Zakopane HS104	Oberstdorf HS137	Oberstdorf HS137	Willingen HS145	Willingen HS145	Lake Placid HS128	Lake Placid HS128	Sapporo HS137	Sapporo HS137	Oslo HS134	Vikersund HS240	Vikersund HS240	Lahti HS130	Planica HS240	Planica HS240				117
2024/25	20	19	49	5	21	23	DQ	39	21	28	21	23	q																				117
