= 2011–12 FIS Ski Flying World Cup =

International skiing competition

Ski Flying World Cup 2011/12
Winners
- Overall: (Slovenia) Robert Kranjec
- Nations Cup (unofficial): Austria

Competitions
- Venues: 3
- Individual: 5
- Team: 2
- Cancelled: 1

The 2011/12 FIS Ski Flying World Cup was the 15th official World Cup season in ski flying awarded with small crystal globe as the subdiscipline of FIS Ski Jumping World Cup.

== Map of World Cup hosts ==
(Austria) Bad Mitterndorf	(Germany) Oberstdorf	(Slovenia) Planica
Kulm	Heini-Klopfer	Letalnica bratov Gorišek
Europe

== Calendar ==
=== Men's Individual ===
All	No.	Date	Place (Hill)	Size	Winner	Second	Third	Ski flying leader	R.
		14 January 2012	(Austria) Bad Mitterndorf (Kulm HS200)	F _{cnx}	cancelled due to strong wind and snow and (rescheduled first on the morning on 15 January)			—	
770	1	(Note: Men's individual cancelled event from Bad Mitterndorf (14 January) was rescheduled on 15 January.)15 January 2012	(Austria) Bad Mitterndorf (Kulm HS200)	F _{086}	(Slovenia) Robert Kranjec	(Austria) T. Morgenstern	(Norway) Anders Bardal	(Slovenia) Robert Kranjec	
771	2	15 January 2012	(Austria) Bad Mitterndorf (Kulm HS200)	F _{087}	(Norway) Anders Bardal	(Japan) Daiki Itō	(Poland) Kamil Stoch	(Norway) Anders Bardal	
779	3	18 February 2012	(Germany) Oberstdorf (Heini-Klopfer HS213)	F _{088}	(Austria) Martin Koch	(Japan) Daiki Itō	(Switzerland) Simon Ammann	(Japan) Daiki Itō	
FIS Ski Flying World Championships 2012 (25 February • (Norway) Vikersund)
783	4	16 March 2012	(Slovenia) Planica (Letalnica b. Gorišek HS215)	F _{089}	(Slovenia) Robert Kranjec	(Switzerland) Simon Ammann	(Austria) Martin Koch	(Slovenia) Robert Kranjec	
784	5	18 March 2012	(Slovenia) Planica (Letalnica b. Gorišek HS215)	F _{090}	(Austria) Martin Koch	(Switzerland) Simon Ammann	(Slovenia) Robert Kranjec	(Slovenia) Robert Kranjec	
15th FIS Ski Flying Men's Overall (14 January – 18 March 2012)					(Slovenia) Robert Kranjec	(Austria) Martin Koch	(Switzerland) Simon Ammann	Ski Flying Overall	

=== Men's team ===
All	No.	Date	Place (Hill)	Size	Winner	Second	Third	R.
58	1	(Note: Men's team event from Oberstorf on 19 February had only one round due to bad weather conditions.)19 February 2012	(Germany) Oberstdorf (Heini-Klopfer-Skiflugschanze HS213)	F _{012}	Slovenia Jurij Tepeš; Jure Šinkovec; Peter Prevc; Robert Kranjec	Austria Thomas Morgenstern; Martin Koch; Andreas Kofler; Gregor Schlierenzauer	Norway Anders Fannemel; Rune Velta; Tom Hilde; Anders Bardal	
60	2	17 March 2012	(Slovenia) Planica (Letalnica bratov Gorišek HS215)	F _{013}	Austria Thomas Morgenstern; Andreas Kofler; Gregor Schlierenzauer; Martin Koch	Norway Rune Velta; Anders Fannemel; Bjørn Einar Romøren; Anders Bardal	Germany Maximilian Mechler; Severin Freund; Andreas Wank; Richard Freitag	

FIS Team Tour 2012 (part of)

== Standings ==
=== Ski Flying ===
Rank	after 5 events	15/01/2012 Kulm	15/01/2012 Kulm	18/02/2012 Oberstdorf	16/03/2012 Planica	18/03/2012 Planica	Total
	(Slovenia) Robert Kranjec	100	45	50	100	60	355
2	(Austria) Martin Koch	24	18	100	60	100	302
3	(Switzerland) Simon Ammann	26	32	60	80	80	278
4	(Japan) Daiki Itō	50	80	80	50	15	275
5	(Norway) Anders Bardal	60	100	22	22	8	212
6	(Poland) Kamil Stoch	40	60	40	29	24	193
7	(Austria) Thomas Morgenstern	80	50	16	10	22	178
8	(Austria) Gregor Schlierenzauer	36	1	36	45	50	168
9	(Germany) Severin Freund	22	29	26	36	40	153
10	(Czech Republic) Roman Koudelka	1	40	45	20	18	124
11	(Germany) Richard Freitag	0	26	13	32	45	116
12	(Austria) Andreas Kofler	18	5	12	40	36	111
13	(Japan) Taku Takeuchi	11	36	15	12	9	83
14	(Norway) Rune Velta	32	24	14	2	1	73
15	(Norway) Bjørn Einar Romøren	4	0	11	26	29	70
16	(Norway) Anders Fannemel	—	—	18	24	26	68
17	(Czech Republic) Lukáš Hlava	—	—	29	15	20	64
18	(Slovenia) Peter Prevc	10	20	32	—	—	62
19	(Norway) Vegard Haukø Sklett	45	16	0	—	—	61
20	(Slovenia) Jurij Tepeš	13	0	0	16	32	61
21	(Germany) Andreas Wank	0	11	20	18	11	60
22	(Norway) Johan Remen Evensen	29	22	5	—	—	56
23	(Poland) Piotr Żyła	14	9	3	7	10	43
24	(Austria) David Zauner	9	12	8	6	5	40
25	(Austria) Wolfgang Loitzl	0	13	—	8	18	39
26	(Germany) Michael Neumayer	16	15	4	0	2	37
27	(Slovenia) Jure Šinkovec	0	8	10	5	13	36
	(Russia) Denis Kornilov	7	0	6	11	12	36
29	(Germany) Maximilian Mechler	4	14	—	—	8	26
30	(Norway) Tom Hilde	—	—	24	—	—	24
31	(Finland) Janne Happonen	20	2	—	—	0	22
32	(Poland) Maciej Kot	0	4	—	14	—	18
	(Norway) Kenneth Gangnes	8	10	—	—	—	18
34	(Czech Republic) Jakub Janda	12	0	—	0	4	16
35	(Finland) Olli Muotka	15	0	—	—	—	15
36	(Italy) Sebastian Colloredo	0	0	—	—	14	14
37	(Poland) Aleksander Zniszczoł	—	—	—	13	—	13
	(Finland) Anssi Koivuranta	0	7	0	—	6	13
39	(Italy) Andrea Morassi	5	0	—	5	—	10
40	(Poland) Klemens Murańka	—	—	—	9	—	9
	(France) Vincent Descombes Sevoie	0	0	9	—	—	9
42	(Norway) Atle Pedersen Rønsen	2	6	—	—	—	8
43	(Poland) Krzysztof Miętus		—	7	0	—	7
	(Austria) Michael Hayböck	7	0	—	—	—	7
45	(Japan) Noriaki Kasai	—	—	2	3	—	5
46	(Russia) Dimitry Vassiliev	0	3	0	—	—	3
	(Slovenia) Jaka Hvala	—	—	—	0	3	3
48	(Japan) Shōhei Tochimoto	—	—	1	—	—	1
	(Norway) Andreas Stjernen	—	—	—	1	—	1

=== Nations Cup (unofficial) ===
Rank	after 7 events	Points
1	Austria	1595
2	Norway	1241
3	Slovenia	1167
4	Germany	942
5	Japan	614
6	Poland	533
7	Czech Republic	504
8	Switzerland	278
9	Russia	139
10	Finland	50
11	Italy	24
12	France	9
