= 2011–12 FIS Ski Jumping World Cup =

Ski jumping competition season

Discipline	Men	Women
Overall	(Norway) Anders Bardal	(United States) Sarah Hendrickson
Nations Cup	Austria	United States
Ski flying	(Slovenia) Robert Kranjec	—
Four Hills Tournament	(Austria) Gregor Schlierenzauer	—
FIS Team Tour	Austria	—

Competition
Edition	33rd	1st
Locations	18	7
Individual	26	13
Team	6	—
Cancelled	1	1
Rescheduled	4 (2 Ind + 2 Team)	2

The 2011–12 FIS Ski Jumping World Cup was the 33rd World Cup season in ski jumping for men, the 15th official World Cup season in ski flying and the 1st World Cup season in history for women, who previously competed only in the Continental Cup.

The men's World Cup began on 27 November 2011 in Kuusamo, Finland and ended on 18 March 2012 in Planica, Slovenia. Women's World Cup began on 3 December 2011 in Lillehammer, Norway and ended on 9 March 2012 in Oslo, Norway.

26 men's individual events on 18 different venues in 10 countries and 13 women's individual events on 7 different venues in 7 countries had been organised on two different continents (Europe and Asia). There were also 6 men's team events. 2 individual events (1 men, 1 women) were cancelled. And 6 events (2 men's individual, 2 Men's team and 2 women's individual) were rescheduled.

Peaks of the season were FIS Ski Flying World Championships, the Four Hills Tournament and FIS Team Tour.

== Map of world cup hosts ==
Europe
Germany	Austria	Asia

== Men's Individual ==
=== Calendar ===
N – normal hill / L – large hill / F – flying hill
All	No.	Date	Place (Hill)	Size	Winner	Second	Third	Overall leader	R.
759	1	27 November 2011	(Finland) Kuusamo (Rukatunturi HS142)	L _{531}	(Austria) Andreas Kofler	(Austria) Gregor Schlierenzauer	(Austria) Thomas Morgenstern	(Austria) Andreas Kofler	
760	2	3 December 2011	(Norway) Lillehammer (Lysgårdsbakken HS100/138)	N _{144}	(Austria) Andreas Kofler	(Germany) Richard Freitag	(Poland) Kamil Stoch	(Austria) Andreas Kofler	
761	3	4 December 2011	(Norway) Lillehammer (Lysgårdsbakken HS100/138)	L _{532}	(Austria) Andreas Kofler	(Germany) Severin Freund (Norway) Anders Bardal		(Austria) Andreas Kofler	
762	4	9 December 2011	(Czech Republic) Harrachov (Čerťák HS142)	L _{533}	(Austria) Gregor Schlierenzauer	(Japan) Daiki Ito	(Norway) Anders Bardal	(Austria) Andreas Kofler	
763	5	11 December 2011	(Czech Republic) Harrachov (Čerťák HS142)	L _{534}	(Germany) Richard Freitag	(Austria) Thomas Morgenstern	(Germany) Severin Freund	(Austria) Andreas Kofler	
764	6	17 December 2011	(Switzerland) Engelberg (Gross-Titlis-Schanze HS137)	L _{535}	(Norway) Anders Bardal	(Austria) Martin Koch	(Austria) Thomas Morgenstern	(Austria) Andreas Kofler	
765	7	18 December 2011	(Switzerland) Engelberg (Gross-Titlis-Schanze HS137)	L _{536}	(Austria) Andreas Kofler	(Poland) Kamil Stoch	(Norway) Anders Bardal	(Austria) Andreas Kofler	
766	8	30 December 2011	(Germany) Oberstdorf (Schattenberg HS137)	L _{537}	(Austria) Gregor Schlierenzauer	(Austria) Andreas Kofler	(Austria) Thomas Morgenstern	(Austria) Andreas Kofler	
767	9	1 January 2012	(Germany) Garmisch-Pa (Gr. Olympiaschanze HS140)	L _{538}	(Austria) Gregor Schlierenzauer	(Austria) Andreas Kofler	(Japan) Daiki Ito	(Austria) Andreas Kofler	
768	10	4 January 2012	(Austria) Innsbruck (Bergiselschanze HS130)	L _{539}	(Austria) Andreas Kofler	(Austria) Gregor Schlierenzauer	(Japan) Taku Takeuchi	(Austria) Andreas Kofler	
769	11	6 January 2012	(Austria) Bischofshofen (Paul-Ausserleitner HS140)	L _{540}	(Austria) Thomas Morgenstern	(Norway) Anders Bardal	(Austria) Gregor Schlierenzauer	(Austria) Andreas Kofler	
60th Four Hills Tournament Overall (30 December 2011 – 6 January 2012)					(Austria) Gregor Schlierenzauer	(Austria) Thomas Morgenstern	(Austria) Andreas Kofler	4H Tournament	
		14 January 2012	(Austria) Bad Mitterndorf (Kulm HS200)	F _{cnx}	cancelled due to strong wind and snow and rescheduled on 15 January				
770	12	(Note: Men's individual cancelled event from Bad Mitterndorf (14 January) was rescheduled on 15 January.)15 January 2012	(Austria) Bad Mitterndorf (Kulm HS200)	F _{086}	(Slovenia) Robert Kranjec	(Austria) Thomas Morgenstern	(Norway) Anders Bardal	(Austria) Andreas Kofler	
771	13	15 January 2012	(Austria) Bad Mitterndorf (Kulm HS200)	F _{087}	(Norway) Anders Bardal	(Japan) Daiki Ito	(Poland) Kamil Stoch	(Austria) Andreas Kofler	
772	14	20 January 2012	(Poland) Zakopane (Wielka Krokiew HS134)	L _{541}	(Poland) Kamil Stoch	(Germany) Richard Freitag	(Austria) Andreas Kofler	(Austria) Andreas Kofler	
773	15	21 January 2012	(Poland) Zakopane (Wielka Krokiew HS134)	L _{542}	(Austria) Gregor Schlierenzauer	(Germany) Richard Freitag	(Norway) Anders Bardal	(Austria) Andreas Kofler	
774	16	28 January 2012	(Japan) Sapporo (Ōkurayama HS134)	L _{543}	(Japan) Daiki Ito	(Norway) Anders Bardal	(Poland) Kamil Stoch	(Austria) Andreas Kofler	
775	17	29 January 2012	(Japan) Sapporo (Ōkurayama HS134)	L _{544}	(Japan) Daiki Ito	(Poland) Kamil Stoch	(Austria) Andreas Kofler	(Austria) Andreas Kofler	
776	18	4 February 2012	(Italy) Val di Fiemme (Trampolino dal Ben HS134)	L _{545}	(Austria) Gregor Schlierenzauer	(Germany) Severin Freund	(Austria) Thomas Morgenstern	(Austria) Andreas Kofler	
777	19	5 February 2012	(Italy) Val di Fiemme (Trampolino dal Ben HS134)	L _{546}	(Poland) Kamil Stoch	(Austria) Gregor Schlierenzauer	(Norway) Anders Bardal	(Austria) Andreas Kofler	
778	20	12 February 2012	(Germany) Willingen (Mühlenkopfschanze HS145)	L _{547}	(Norway) Anders Bardal	(Czech Republic) Roman Koudelka	(Japan) Daiki Ito	(Norway) Anders Bardal	
		15 February 2012	(Germany) Klingenthal (Vogtland Arena HS140)	L _{cnx}	cancelled due to strong wind and rescheduled on 16 February			—	
		(Note: Men's individual cancelled event from Klingenthal (15 February) was rescheduled on 16 February (but finally cancelled).)16 February 2012	(Germany) Klingenthal (Vogtland Arena HS140)	L _{cnx}	ather 90 minutes of waiting finally cancelled again due to strong wind			—	
779	21	18 February 2012	(Germany) Oberstdorf (Heini-Klopfer HS213)	F _{088}	(Austria) Martin Koch	(Japan) Daiki Ito	(Switzerland) Simon Ammann	(Norway) Anders Bardal	
4th FIS Team Tour Overall; TWO TEAM EVENTS INCLUDED (11 – 19 February 2012)					Austria	Norway	Slovenia	FIS Team Tour	
FIS Ski Flying World Championships 2012 (25 February • (Norway) Vikersund)
		4 March 2012	(Finland) Lahti (Salpausselkä HS130 / 97)	L _{cnx}	cancelled due to strong wind and moved to normal hill HS97				
780	22	(Note: Men's individual large hill HS130 event from Lahti (4 March) was moved to normal hill HS97.)4 March 2012	(Finland) Lahti (Salpausselkä HS130 / 97)	N _{145}	(Japan) Daiki Ito	(Norway) Anders Bardal	(Czech Republic) Lukáš Hlava	(Norway) Anders Bardal	
781	23	8 March 2012	(Norway) Trondheim (Granåsen HS140)	L _{548}	(Japan) Daiki Ito	(Germany) Richard Freitag	(Switzerland) Simon Ammann	(Norway) Anders Bardal	
782	24	11 March 2012	(Norway) Oslo (Holmenkollbakken HS134)	L _{549}	(Austria) Martin Koch	(Germany) Severin Freund	(Slovenia) Robert Kranjec	(Norway) Anders Bardal	
783	25	16 March 2012	(Slovenia) Planica (Letalnica b. Gorišek HS215)	F _{089}	(Slovenia) Robert Kranjec	(Switzerland) Simon Ammann	(Austria) Martin Koch	(Norway) Anders Bardal	
784	26	18 March 2012	(Slovenia) Planica (Letalnica b. Gorišek HS215)	F _{090}	(Austria) Martin Koch	(Switzerland) Simon Ammann	(Slovenia) Robert Kranjec	(Norway) Anders Bardal	
33rd FIS World Cup Men's Overall (27 November 2011 – 18 March 2012)					(Norway) Anders Bardal	(Austria) Gregor Schlierenzauer	(Austria) Andreas Kofler	World Cup Overall	

=== Standings ===
==== Overall ====
Rank	after 26 events	Points
1	(Norway) Anders Bardal	1325
2	(Austria) Gregor Schlierenzauer	1267
3	(Austria) Andreas Kofler	1203
4	(Japan) Daiki Ito	1131
5	(Poland) Kamil Stoch	1078
6	(Germany) Richard Freitag	1031
7	(Austria) Thomas Morgenstern	1014
8	(Germany) Severin Freund	857
9	(Slovenia) Robert Kranjec	829
10	(Czech Republic) Roman Koudelka	796

==== Ski Flying ====
Rank	after 5 events	Points
1	(Slovenia) Robert Kranjec	355
2	(Austria) Martin Koch	302
3	(Switzerland) Simon Ammann	278
4	(Japan) Daiki Ito	275
5	(Norway) Anders Bardal	212
6	(Poland) Kamil Stoch	193
7	(Austria) Thomas Morgenstern	178
8	(Austria) Gregor Schlierenzauer	168
9	(Germany) Severin Freund	153
10	(Czech Republic) Roman Koudelka	124

==== Nations Cup ====
Rank	after 32 events	Points
1	Austria	6935
2	Norway	4530
3	Germany	4353
4	Slovenia	3412
5	Japan	2827
6	Poland	2638
7	Czech Republic	2178
8	Russia	918
9	Switzerland	753
10	Finland	611

==== Four Hills Tournament ====
Rank	after 4 events	Points
1	(Austria) Gregor Schlierenzauer	933.8
2	(Austria) Thomas Morgenstern	908.0
3	(Austria) Andreas Kofler	896.9
4	(Norway) Anders Bardal	895.0
5	(Czech Republic) Roman Koudelka	881.2
6	(Japan) Daiki Ito	852.1
7	(Germany) Severin Freund	843.4
8	(Poland) Kamil Stoch	843.0
9	(Japan) Taku Takeuchi	842.6
10	(Germany) Richard Freitag	820.4

==== Prize money ====
Rank	after 32 events	CHF
1	(Austria) Gregor Schlierenzauer	165,700
2	(Austria) Andreas Kofler	159,300
3	(Norway) Anders Bardal	156,450
4	(Austria) Thomas Morgenstern	140,400
5	(Japan) Daiki Ito	118,550
6	(Germany) Richard Freitag	117,600
7	(Poland) Kamil Stoch	111,950
8	(Germany) Severin Freund	99,200
9	(Austria) Martin Koch	95,000
10	(Slovenia) Robert Kranjec	94,850

==== FIS Team Tour ====
Rank	after 4 events	Points
1	Austria	3055.9
2	Norway	3030.0
3	Slovenia	2994.9
4	Germany	2966.0
5	Czech Republic	2892.4
6	Japan	2878.1
7	Poland	2799.6
8	Finland	1902.3
9	Russia	1861.2
10	Switzerland	1123.3

== Women's Individual ==
=== Calendar ===
All	No.	Date	Place (Hill)	Size	Winner	Second	Third	Overall leader	R.
1	1	3 December 2011	(Norway) Lillehammer (Lysgårdsbakken HS100)	N _{001}	(United States) Sarah Hendrickson	(France) Coline Mattel	(Germany) Melanie Faisst	(United States) Sarah Hendrickson	
		6 January 2012	(Germany) Schonach (Langenwaldschanze HS108)	N _{cnx}	cancelled due to high temperatures and lack of snow (rescheduled to Hinterzarten on 7 January)			—	
2	2	(Note: Cancelled women's individual event from Schonach (6 January) was rescheduled to Hinterzarten on 7 January.)7 January 2012	(Germany) Hinterzarten (Rothaus-Schanze HS108)	N _{002}	(Switzerland) Sabrina Windmüller	(United States) Lindsey Van	(Italy) Lisa Demetz	(United States) Sarah Hendrickson	
3	3	8 January 2012	(Germany) Hinterzarten (Rothaus-Schanze HS108)	N _{003}	(United States) Sarah Hendrickson	(Japan) Sara Takanashi	(United States) Jessica Jerome	(United States) Sarah Hendrickson	
4	4	14 January 2012	(Italy) Val di Fiemme (Trampolino dal Ben HS106)	N _{004}	(United States) Sarah Hendrickson	(Austria) Daniela Iraschko	(Norway) Anette Sagen	(United States) Sarah Hendrickson	
5	5	15 January 2012	(Italy) Val di Fiemme (Trampolino dal Ben HS106)	N _{005}	(United States) Sarah Hendrickson	(Austria) Daniela Iraschko	(Germany) Ulrike Gräßler	(United States) Sarah Hendrickson	
		28 January 2012	(Poland) Szczyrk (Skalite HS106)	N _{cnx}	cancelled due to technical reasons and replaced as COC in Zakopane (as World Cup rescheduled to Zaō on 3 March as the second competition)			—	
		29 January 2012	(Poland) Szczyrk (Skalite HS106)	N _{cnx}	cancelled due to technical reasons and replaced as COC in Zakopane			—	
6	6	(Note: Women's individual event from Hinzenbach (4 February) was held in one round only due to weather conditions.)4 February 2012	(Austria) Hinzenbach (Aigner-Schanze HS94)	N _{006}	(Austria) Daniela Iraschko	(United States) Sarah Hendrickson	(Slovenia) Katja Požun	(United States) Sarah Hendrickson	
7	7	5 February 2012	(Austria) Hinzenbach (Aigner-Schanze HS94)	N _{007}	(Austria) Daniela Iraschko	(United States) Sarah Hendrickson	(United States) Lindsey Van	(United States) Sarah Hendrickson	
8	8	11 February 2012	(Slovenia) Ljubno (Savina HS95)	N _{008}	(United States) Sarah Hendrickson	(Japan) Sara Takanashi	(Austria) Daniela Iraschko	(United States) Sarah Hendrickson	
9	9	12 February 2012	(Slovenia) Ljubno (Savina HS95)	N _{009}	(United States) Sarah Hendrickson	(Japan) Sara Takanashi	(Austria) J. Seifriedsberger	(United States) Sarah Hendrickson	
10	10	3 March 2012	(Japan) Zaō (Yamagata HS100)	N _{010}	(United States) Sarah Hendrickson	(Japan) Sara Takanashi	(Austria) Daniela Iraschko	(United States) Sarah Hendrickson	
11	11	(Note: Cancelled individual event from Szczyrk (28 January) was rescheduled to Zaō (3 March); held only in one round due to weather conditions.)3 March 2012	(Japan) Zaō (Yamagata HS100)	N _{011}	(Japan) Sara Takanashi	(United States) Sarah Hendrickson	(Germany) Ulrike Gräßler	(United States) Sarah Hendrickson	
12	12	4 March 2012	(Japan) Zaō (Yamagata HS100)	N _{012}	(United States) Sarah Hendrickson	(Japan) Sara Takanashi	(Austria) Daniela Iraschko	(United States) Sarah Hendrickson	
13	13	9 March 2012	(Norway) Oslo (Midtstubakken HS106)	N _{013}	(United States) Sarah Hendrickson	(Japan) Sara Takanashi	(Norway) Anette Sagen	(United States) Sarah Hendrickson	
1st FIS World Cup Women's Overall (3 December 2011 – 9 March 2012)					(United States) Sarah Hendrickson	(Austria) Daniela Iraschko	(Japan) Sara Takanashi	World Cup Overall	

=== Standings ===
==== Overall ====
Rank	after 13 events	Points
1	(United States) Sarah Hendrickson	1169
2	(Austria) Daniela Iraschko	779
3	(Japan) Sara Takanashi	639
4	(Germany) Ulrike Gräßler	546
5	(United States) Lindsey Van	482
6	(Norway) Anette Sagen	454
7	(Slovenia) Katja Požun	422
8	(Germany) Melanie Faißt	409
9	(United States) Jessica Jerome	395
10	(France) Coline Mattel	328

==== Nations Cup ====
Rank	after 13 events	Points
1	United States	2228
2	Germany	1601
3	Japan	1251
4	Austria	1173
5	Slovenia	934
6	Norway	828
7	France	496
8	Italy	466
9	Switzerland	130
10	Finland	80

==== Prize money ====
Rank	after 13 events	CHF
1	(United States) Sarah Hendrickson	35,070
2	(Austria) Daniela Iraschko	23,370
3	(Japan) Sara Takanashi	18,750
4	(Germany) Ulrike Gräßler	15,930
5	(United States) Lindsey Van	14,415
6	(Norway) Anette Sagen	13,200
7	(Slovenia) Katja Požun	12,090
8	(Germany) Melanie Faißt	11,940
9	(United States) Jessica Jerome	11,520
10	(Austria) J. Seifriedsberger	9,510

== Team events ==
=== Calendar ===
All	No.	Date	Place (Hill)	Size	Winner	Second	Third	R.
Men's team
		26 November 2011	(Finland) Kuusamo (Rukatunturi HS142)	L _{cnx}	cancelled due to strong wind and postponed on next day			
55	1	(Note: Men's team cancelled event from Kuusamo on 26 November was rescheduled on 27 November.)27 November 2011	(Finland) Kuusamo (Rukatunturi HS142)	L _{043}	Austria Wolfgang Loitzl; Andreas Kofler; Gregor Schlierenzauer; Thomas Morgenstern	Japan Junshiro Kobayashi; Shohei Tochimoto; Taku Takeuchi; Daiki Ito	Russia Dimitry Vassiliev; Anton Kalinitschenko; Roman Trofimov; Denis Kornilov	
56	2	10 December 2011	(Czech Republic) Harrachov (Čerťák HS142)	L _{044}	Norway Tom Hilde; Bjørn Einar Romøren; Vegard-Haukø Sklett; Anders Bardal	Austria Thomas Morgenstern; David Zauner; Andreas Kofler; Gregor Schlierenzauer	Slovenia Jernej Damjan; Jure Šinkovec; Peter Prevc; Robert Kranjec	
57	3	11 February 2012	(Germany) Willingen (Mühlenkopf HS145)	L _{045}	Norway Anders Fannemel; Rune Velta; Vegard-Haukø Sklett; Anders Bardal	Austria Martin Koch; Andreas Kofler; Thomas Morgenstern; Gregor Schlierenzauer	Germany Maximilian Mechler; Andreas Wank; Severin Freund; Richard Freitag	
58	4	(Note: Men's team event from Oberstorf on 19 February had only one round due to bad weather conditions.)19 February 2012	(Germany) Oberstdorf (Heini-Klopfer HS213)	F _{012}	Slovenia Jurij Tepeš; Jure Šinkovec; Peter Prevc; Robert Kranjec	Austria Thomas Morgenstern; Martin Koch; Andreas Kofler; Gregor Schlierenzauer	Norway Anders Fannemel; Rune Velta; Tom Hilde; Anders Bardal	
4th FIS Team Tour Overall; THREE INDIVIDUAL EVENTS INCLUDED (11 – 19 February 2012)					Austria	Norway	Slovenia	
		3 March 2012	(Finland) Lahti (Salpausselkä HS130 / 97)	L _{cnx}	HS130 event cancelled and moved to HS97 due to weather condtitions			
59	5	(Note: Men's team event from Lahti on 3 March was moved from large to normal hill.)3 March 2012	(Finland) Lahti (Salpausselkä HS130 / 97)	N _{002}	Austria Thomas Morgenstern; Gregor Schlierenzauer; Martin Koch; Andreas Kofler	Germany Andreas Wank; Maximilian Mechler; Severin Freund; Richard Freitag	Poland Maciej Kot; Klemens Murańka; Aleksander Zniszczoł; Kamil Stoch	
60	6	17 March 2012	(Slovenia) Planica (Letalnica bratov Gorišek HS215)	F _{013}	Austria Thomas Morgenstern; Andreas Kofler; Gregor Schlierenzauer; Martin Koch	Norway Rune Velta; Anders Fannemel; Bjørn Einar Romøren; Anders Bardal	Germany Maximilian Mechler; Severin Freund; Andreas Wank; Richard Freitag	

== Achievements ==
First World Cup career victory

- (United States) Sarah Hendrickson, 17, in her 1st season – the WC 1 in Lillehammer; it also was her first podium
- (Germany) Richard Freitag, 20, in his 3rd season – the WC 5 in Harrachov; first podium was 2011–12 WC 2 in Lillehammer
- (Switzerland) Sabrina Windmüller, 24, in her 1st season – the WC 2 in Hinterzarten; it also was her first podium
- (Japan) Daiki Ito, 26, in his 11th season – the WC 16 in Sapporo; first podium was 2004–05 WC 12 in Bischofshofen
- (Austria) Daniela Iraschko, 28, in her 1st season – the WC 6 in Hinzenbach; first podium was 2011–12 WC 4 in Val di Fiemme
- (Japan) Sara Takanashi, 15, in her 1st season – the WC 11 in Zaō; first podium was 2011–12 WC 3 in Hinterzarten

First World Cup podium

- (Germany) Richard Freitag, 20, in his 3rd season – no. 2 in the WC 2 in Lillehammer
- (France) Coline Mattel, 16, in her 1st season – no. 2 in the WC 1 in Lillehammer
- (Germany) Melanie Faisst, 21, in her 1st season – no. 3 in the WC 1 in Lillehammer
- (Japan) Taku Takeuchi, 24, in his 6th season – no. 3 in the WC 10 in Innsbruck
- (United States) Lindsay Van, 27, in her 1st season – no. 2 in the WC 2 in Hinterzarten
- (Italy) Lisa Demetz, 22, in her 1st season – no. 3 in the WC 2 in Hinterzarten
- (Japan) Sara Takanashi, 15, in her 1st season – no. 2 in the WC 3 in Hinterzarten
- (United States) Jessica Jerome, 24, in her 1st season – no. 3 in the WC 3 in Hinterzarten
- (Austria) Daniela Iraschko, 28, in her 1st season – no. 2 in the WC 4 in Val di Fiemme
- (Norway) Anette Sagen, 27, in her 1st season – no. 3 in the WC 4 in Val di Fiemme
- (Germany) Ulrike Gräßler, 24, in her 1st season – no. 3 in the WC 5 in Val di Fiemme
- (Slovenia) Katja Požun, 18, in her 1st season – no. 3 in the WC 6 in Hinzenbach
- (Austria) Jacqueline Seifriedsberger, 21, in her 1st season – no. 3 in the WC 9 in Ljubno
- (Czech Republic) Lukáš Hlava, 27, in his 10th season – no. 3 in the WC 23 in Lahti

Victory in this World Cup (in brackets victory for all time)

- (Austria) Gregor Schlierenzauer, 5 (40) first places
- (Austria) Andreas Kofler, 5 (10) first places
- (Japan) Daiki Ito, 4 (4) first places
- (Austria) Martin Koch, 3 (5) first places
- (Norway) Anders Bardal, 3 (4) first places
- (Poland) Kamil Stoch, 2 (5) first places
- (Slovenia) Robert Kranjec, 2 (4) first places
- (Austria) Thomas Morgenstern, 1 (22) first places
- (Germany) Richard Freitag, 1 (1) first place
- (United States) Sarah Hendrickson, 9 (9) first places
- (Austria) Daniela Iraschko, 2 (2) first places
- (Switzerland) Sabrina Windmüller, 1 (1) first place
- (Japan) Sara Takanashi, 1 (1) first place

== See also ==
- 2011 Grand Prix (top level summer series)
- 2011–12 FIS Continental Cup (2nd level competition)
