= 2011–12 Four Hills Tournament =

Ski jumping competition

Four Hills Tournament at the 2011–12 FIS Ski Jumping World Cup
- Venue: Schattenbergschanze, Große Olympiaschanze, Bergiselschanze, Paul-Ausserleitner-Schanze
- Location: Austria, Germany
- Dates: 30 December 2011 – 6 January 2012

Medalists
gold medal	(Austria) Gregor Schlierenzauer
silver medal	(Austria) Thomas Morgenstern
bronze medal	(Austria) Andreas Kofler

The 2011–12 Four Hills Tournament took place at the four traditional venues of Oberstdorf, Garmisch-Partenkirchen, Innsbruck, and Bischofshofen, located in Germany and Austria, between 30 December 2011 and 6 January 2012.

== Results ==
=== Oberstdorf ===
HS 137 Schattenbergschanze, Germany
30 December 2011

Rank	Name	Nationality	Jump 1 (m)	Jump 2 (m)	Points
1	Gregor Schlierenzauer	Austria	133.0	137.5	283.3
2	Andreas Kofler	Austria	131.0	133.5	265.2
3	Thomas Morgenstern	Austria	128.0	128.5	264.3
4	Severin Freund	Germany	129.0	127.0	264.0
5	Daiki Ito	Japan	130.0	124.0	262.7
6	Anders Bardal	Norway	120.5	131.5	258.0
7	Roman Koudelka	Czech Republic	124.0	127.5	255.6
8	Stephan Hocke	Germany	122.0	123.5	243.8
9	Robert Kranjec	Slovenia	126.0	121.0	242.2
10	Richard Freitag	Germany	121.0	122.5	240.3

=== Garmisch-Partenkirchen ===
HS 137 Große Olympiaschanze, Germany
1 January 2012

Rank	Name	Nationality	Jump 1 (m)	Jump 2 (m)	Points
1	Gregor Schlierenzauer	Austria	138.0	134.0	274.5
2	Andreas Kofler	Austria	130.5	137.5	270.4
3	Daiki Ito	Japan	138.5	141.5	269.6
4	Kamil Stoch	Poland	132.0	137.5	268.0
4	Taku Takeuchi	Japan	130.5	140.0	268.0
6	Thomas Morgenstern	Austria	132.0	136.5	267.9
7	Severin Freund	Germany	138.5	130.5	262.2
8	Roman Koudelka	Czech Republic	136.0	135.5	262.1
9	Anders Bardal	Norway	129.0	131.5	256.1
10	Simon Ammann	Switzerland	136.5	129.5	255.0

=== Innsbruck ===
HS 130 Bergiselschanze, Austria
4 January 2012

Rank	Name	Nationality	Jump 1 (m)	Jump 2 (m)	Points
1	Andreas Kofler	Austria	127.5	131.5	252.8
2	Gregor Schlierenzauer	Austria	130.5	123.0	247.6
3	Taku Takeuchi	Japan	131.5	124.0	246.7
4	Anders Bardal	Norway	128.0	125.5	244.4
5	Roman Koudelka	Czech Republic	123.5	122.5	239.5
6	Thomas Morgenstern	Austria	120.5	123.0	237.1
7	Maximilian Mechler	Germany	119.0	126.0	235.1
8	Michael Neumayer	Germany	132.0	121.5	234.4
9	Kamil Stoch	Poland	132.5	108.0	232.0
10	Lukáš Hlava	Czech Republic	126.0	118.0	229.5

=== Bischofshofen ===
HS 140 Paul-Ausserleitner-Schanze, Austria
6 January 2012

Rank	Name	Nationality	Jump 1 (m)	Jump 2 (m)	Points
1	Thomas Morgenstern	Austria	135.0	Cancelled (heavy snowfall)	138.7
2	Anders Bardal	Norway	135.0	Cancelled (heavy snowfall)	136.5
3	Gregor Schlierenzauer	Austria	131.0	Cancelled (heavy snowfall)	128.4
4	Robert Kranjec	Slovenia	129.0	Cancelled (heavy snowfall)	126.8
5	Daiki Ito	Japan	130.5	Cancelled (heavy snowfall)	126.2
6	Roman Koudelka	Czech Republic	129.5	Cancelled (heavy snowfall)	124.0
7	Michael Hayböck	Austria	135.0	Cancelled (heavy snowfall)	123.9
8	Dimitry Vassiliev	Russia	130.0	Cancelled (heavy snowfall)	123.1
9	Kamil Stoch	Poland	129.0	Cancelled (heavy snowfall)	121.9
10	Richard Freitag	Germany	125.5	Cancelled (heavy snowfall)	119.0

== Overall standings ==
The final standings after all four events:

Rank	Name	Nationality	Oberstdorf	Garmisch- Partenkirchen	Innsbruck	Bischofshofen	Total Points
1st place, gold medalist(s)	Gregor Schlierenzauer	Austria	283.3 (1)	274.5 (1)	247.6 (2)	128.4 (3)	933.8
2nd place, silver medalist(s)	Thomas Morgenstern	Austria	264.3 (3)	267.9 (6)	237.1 (6)	138.7 (1)	908.0
3rd place, bronze medalist(s)	Andreas Kofler	Austria	265.2 (2)	270.4 (2)	252.8 (1)	108.5 (27)	896.9
4	Anders Bardal	Norway	258.0 (6)	256.1 (9)	244.4 (4)	136.5 (2)	895.0
5	Roman Koudelka	Czech Republic	255.6 (7)	262.1 (8)	239.5 (5)	124.0 (6)	881.2
6	Daiki Ito	Japan	262.7 (5)	269.6 (3)	193.6 (27)	126.2 (5)	852.1
7	Severin Freund	Germany	264.0 (4)	262.2 (7)	211.8 (21)	105.4 (30)	843.4
8	Kamil Stoch	Poland	221.1 (23)	268.0 (4)	232.0 (9)	121.9 (9)	843.0
9	Taku Takeuchi	Japan	216.3 (25)	268.0 (4)	246.7 (3)	111.6 (23)	842.6
10	Richard Freitag	Germany	240.3 (10)	233.9 (25)	227.2 (12)	119.0 (10)	820.4
