= FIS Team Tour 2012 =

The FIS Team Tour 2012 was a team competition that took place at Willingen and Oberstdorf located in Germany, between 11–19 February 2012.

== Results ==
Date	Place	Hill	Size	Winner	Second	Third	Ref.
11 Febr 2012	(Germany) Willingen	Mühlenkopfschanze HS 145 (night)	LH	Norway; Anders Fannemel; Rune Velta; Vegard-Haukø Sklett; Anders Bardal	Austria; Martin Koch; Andreas Kofler; Thomas Morgenstern; Gregor Schlierenzauer	Germany; Maximilian Mechler; Andreas Wank; Severin Freund; Richard Freitag	
12 Feb 2012	(Germany) Willingen	Mühlenkopfschanze HS 145	LH	(Norway) Anders Bardal	(Czech Republic) Roman Koudelka	(Japan) Daiki Ito	
~~15 Feb 2012~~	(Germany) Klingenthal	Vogtland Arena HS 140 (night)	LH	cancelled; strong winds			
18 Feb 2012	(Germany) Oberstdorf	Heini-Klopfer-Skiflug. HS 213 (night)	FH	(Austria) Martin Koch	(Japan) Daiki Ito	(Switzerland) Simon Ammann	
19 Feb 2012	(Germany) Oberstdorf	Heini-Klopfer-Skiflugschanze HS 213	FH	Slovenia; Jurij Tepeš; Jure Šinkovec; Peter Prevc; Robert Kranjec	Austria; Thomas Morgenstern; Martin Koch; Andreas Kofler; Gregor Schlierenzauer	Norway; Anders Fannemel; Rune Velta; Tom Hilde; Anders Bardal	

== Overall ==
Pos	Ski Jumper	Points
1	Austria	3055.9
2	Norway	3030.0
3	Slovenia	2994.9
4	Germany	2966.0
5	Czech Republic	2892.4
6	Japan	2878.1
7	Poland	2799.6
8	Finland	1902.3
9	Russia	1861.2
10	Switzerland	1123.3
