= 2011 FIS Ski Jumping Grand Prix =

International ski jumping competition

Grand Prix 2011
Winners
- Overall: (Austria) Thomas Morgenstern
- Poland Tour: (Austria) Thomas Morgenstern
- Nations Cup: Austria

Competitions
- Venues: 10
- Individual: 11
- Team: 2

The 2011 FIS Ski Jumping Grand Prix was the 18th Summer Grand Prix season in ski jumping on plastic. Season began on 17 July 2011 in Wisła, Poland and ended on 3 October 2011 in Klingenthal, Germany.

Other competitive circuits this season included the World Cup and Continental Cup.

== Calendar ==
=== Men ===
Num	Season	Date	Place	Hill	Size	Winner	Second	Third	Yellow bib	Ref.
117	1	17 July 2011	(Poland) Wisła	Malinka HS134	LH	(Austria) Thomas Morgenstern	(Russia) Pavel Karelin	(Austria) Gregor Schlierenzauer	(Austria) Thomas Morgenstern	
118	2	20 July 2011	(Poland) Szczyrk	Skalite HS106	NH	(Austria) Thomas Morgenstern	(Austria) Gregor Schlierenzauer	(Poland) Kamil Stoch	(Austria) Thomas Morgenstern	
119	3	23 July 2011	(Poland) Zakopane	Wielka Krokiew HS134	LH	(Austria) Thomas Morgenstern	(Austria) Gregor Schlierenzauer	(Poland) Kamil Stoch	(Austria) Thomas Morgenstern	
Poland Tour Overall (17–23 July 2011)						(Austria) Thomas Morgenstern	(Austria) Gregor Schlierenzauer	(Poland) Kamil Stoch		
120	4	7 August 2011	(Germany) Hinterzarten	Rothaus-Schanze HS108	NH	(Austria) Thomas Morgenstern	(Poland) Kamil Stoch	(Germany) Richard Freitag	(Austria) Thomas Morgenstern	
121	5	12 August 2011	(France) Courchevel	Tremplin du Praz HS132	LH	(Austria) Thomas Morgenstern	(Germany) Richard Freitag	(Poland) Kamil Stoch	(Austria) Thomas Morgenstern	
122	6	14 August 2011	(Switzerland) Einsiedeln	Andreas Küttel Schanze HS117	LH	(Poland) Kamil Stoch	(Austria) Thomas Morgenstern	(Norway) Rune Velta	(Austria) Thomas Morgenstern	
123	7	26 August 2011	(Japan) Hakuba	Olympic Ski Jumps HS131 (night)	LH	(Norway) Tom Hilde	(Poland) Piotr Żyła	(Japan) Taku Takeuchi	(Austria) Thomas Morgenstern	
124	8	27 August 2011	(Japan) Hakuba	Olympic Ski Jumps HS131 (night)	LH	(Norway) Tom Hilde	(Poland) Piotr Żyła	(Japan) Taku Takeuchi	(Austria) Thomas Morgenstern	
125	9	30 August 2011	(Kazakhstan) Almaty	Sunkar HS140 (night)	LH	(Slovenia) Jurij Tepeš	(Slovenia) Jure Šinkovec	(Norway) Anders Fannemel	(Austria) Thomas Morgenstern	
126	10	1 October 2011	(Austria) Hinzenbach	Aigner-Schanze HS94	NH	(Poland) Gregor Schlierenzauer	(Austria) Daiki Ito	(Czech Republic) Roman Koudelka	(Austria) Thomas Morgenstern	
127	11	3 October 2011	(Germany) Klingenthal	Vogtland Arena HS140	LH	(Poland) Kamil Stoch	(Austria) Gregor Schlierenzauer	(Czech Republic) Roman Koudelka	(Austria) Thomas Morgenstern	

=== Men's team ===
Num	Season	Date	Place	Hill	Size	Winner	Second	Third	Yellow bib	Ref.
14	1	22 July 2011	(Poland) Zakopane	Wielka Krokiew HS134 (night)	LH	Austria Wolfgang Loitzl; Martin Koch; Gregor Schlierenzauer; Thomas Morgenstern	Germany Martin Schmitt; Stephan Hocke; Richard Freitag; Severin Freund	Russia Denis Kornilov; Dimitry Ipatov; Ilja Rosliakov; Pavel Karelin	Austria	
15	2	6 August 2011	(Germany) Hinterzarten	Rothaus-Schanze HS108	NH	Austria Andreas Kofler; Michael Hayböck; Manuel Fettner; Thomas Morgenstern	Poland Maciej Kot; Piotr Żyła; Dawid Kubacki; Kamil Stoch	Norway Rune Velta; Kenneth Gangnes; Johan Remen Evensen; Tom Hilde	Austria	

== Standings ==
=== Overall ===
Rank	after 11 events	Points
1	(Austria) Thomas Morgenstern	620
2	(Poland) Kamil Stoch	505
3	(Norway) Tom Hilde	443
4	(Austria) Gregor Schlierenzauer	400
5	(Poland) Piotr Żyła	298

=== Nations Cup ===
Rank	after 13 events	Points
1	Austria	2312
2	Poland	1894
3	Germany	1513
4	Norway	1263
5	Slovenia	1019

=== Poland Tour ===
Rank	after 3 events	Points
1	(Austria) Thomas Morgenstern	766.8
2	(Austria) Gregor Schlierenzauer	754.2
3	(Poland) Kamil Stoch	726.3
4	(Germany) Severin Freund	710.7
5	(Germany) Richard Freitag	706.0
