= FIS Ski Flying World Championships 2012 =

2012 edition of the FIS Ski-Flying World Championships

- Official logo for the FIS Ski Flying World Championships 2012.
- Host city: Vikersund, Norway
- Nations: 16
- Athletes: 50
- Events: 2
- Opening: 23 February
- Closing: 26 February
- Main venue: Vikersundbakken
- Website: Vikersund.no

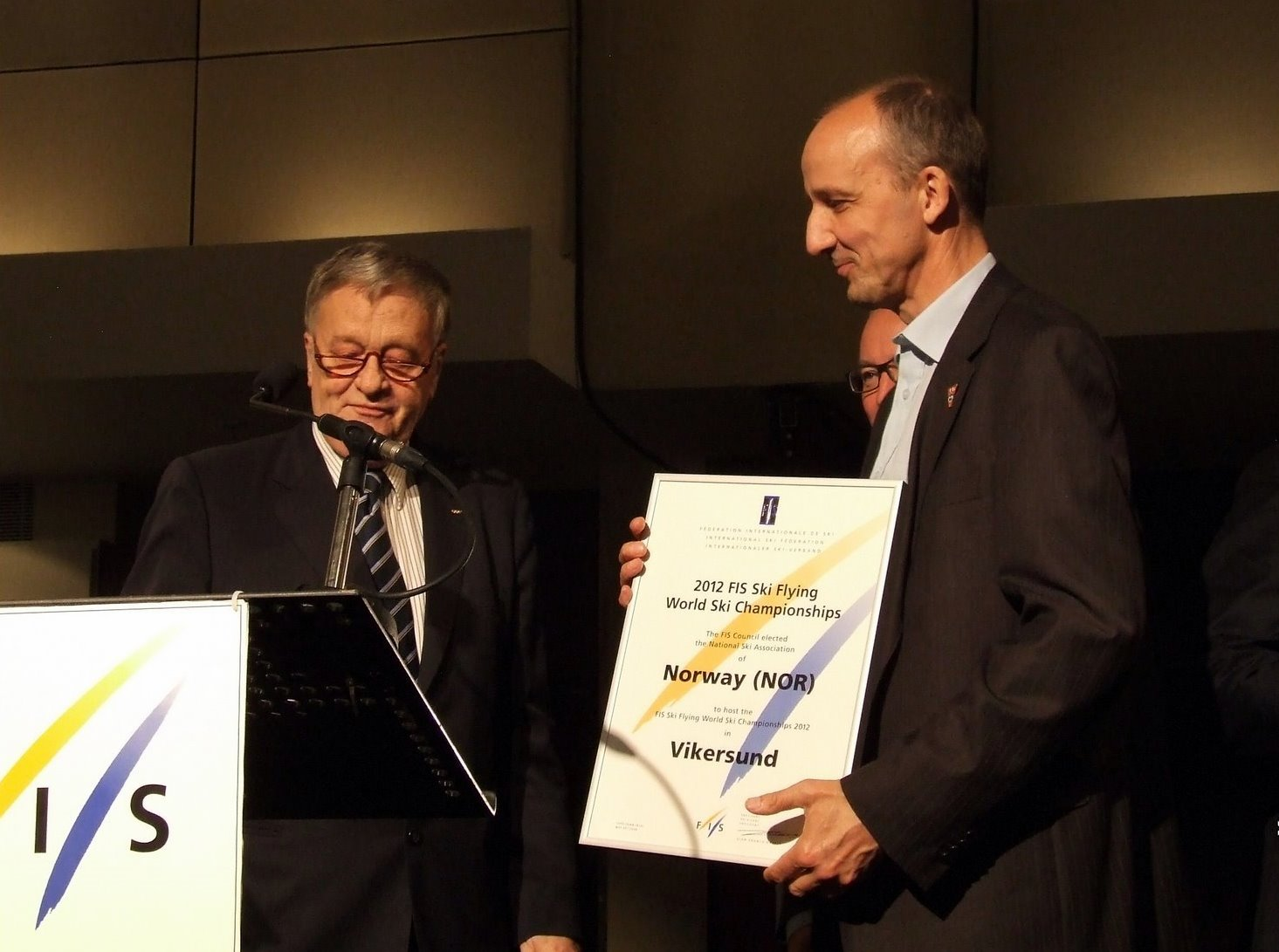
Approval of Vikersund, Norway as host of FIS Ski Flying World Championships 2012, FIS Congress 2008 in Cape Town in South Africa

The FIS Ski Flying World Championships 2012 was a world championship in ski flying, held in Vikersund, Norway, from 23 to 26 February 2012. Vikersund hosted the event previously in 1977, 1990, and 2000.

== Events leading up to the championships ==
In 2010, the hill was being rebuilt. This process which was started after the 2008-09 Ski Jumping World Cup, extended the length of the hill to HS225, making it the world's largest ski jumping hill. Cost to renovate the hill was planned at 80 million kr (€10 million). Included in the cost was a new judges tower, a ski lift, a spectator area, and wind nets.

Hill construction took place where the old hill that was demolished in 2009. Adjustments was the hill turned several degrees and built 6 m (20 ft) into the ground to avoid wind problems. Outrun was elevated 6 m (20 ft) in order for it to be the same levels as the rest of the jumping hills at Vikersund.

The first ski flying competition in the hill took place in 1966 and the hill has been rebuilt on several occasions, most recently for the FIS Ski Flying World Championships in 2000 where it was at a K185 position. It should be ready in time for the World Cup competition in February 2011.

== Schedule ==
Vikersundbakken (K-195; HS225)
Day	Date	Event	Longest jump of the day (m)
Wednesday	Feb 22	Hill Test Jumps	
Thursday	Feb 23	Qualification	237.0 - Martin Koch
Friday	Feb 24	Individual, Day 1 (cancelled)	230.5 - Jurij Tepeš
Saturday	Feb 25	Individual, Day 2	244.5 - Anders Fannemel
Sunday	Feb 26	Team event	243.0 - Rune Velta

== Results ==
=== Qualifying ===
23 February 2012

Rank	Bib	Name	Distance (meters)			Points	Note
Rank	Bib	Name	1st Training	2nd Training	Qualifying	Points	Note
1	43	(Austria) Andreas Kofler	222.0	211.5	221.0	220.3	Q
2	46	(Norway) Rune Velta	208.5	210.0	221.5	216.2	Q
3	35	(Norway) Anders Fannemel	183.0	223.5	211.0	202.8	Q
4	40	(Czech Republic) Lukas Hlava	200.5	208.5	198.5	196.2	Q
5	36	(Finland) Janne Happonen	130.0	184.5	202.5	192.5	Q
6	27	(France) Vincent Descombes Sevoie	147.5	184.0	222.5	190.4	Q
7	45	(Japan) Taku Takeuchi	205.5	196.5	193.5	188.7	Q
8	28	(Czech Republic) Jakub Janda	156.0	199.5	199.0	185.7	Q
9	31	(Norway) Bjørn Einar Romøren	202.0	213.0	191.0	177.2	Q
10	34	(Germany) Maximilian Mechler	193.0	213.0	186.0	174.8	Q
11	44	(Germany) Richard Freitag	209.0	211.0	178.5	169.4	Q
12	30	(Slovenia) Jurij Tepeš	209.5	192.0	177.5	167.2	Q
13	24	(Italy) Andrea Morassi	202.5	210.0	182.0	166.6	Q
14	32	(Finland) Olli Muotka	193.0	207.5	179.0	165.0	Q
15	26	(Poland) Krzysztof Miętus	179.0	210.0	194.5	159.2	Q
16	21	(Japan) Shohei Tochimoto	197.0	202.5	179.5	156.2	Q
17	25	(Finland) Anssi Koivuranta	171.0	212.0	184.5	155.3	Q
18	29	(Russia) Denis Kornilov	213.5	173.5	171.0	154.9	Q
19	41	(Germany) Andreas Wank	194.5	203.0	164.0	150.9	Q
20	38	(Poland) Piotr Żyła	138.0	180.5	164.5	150.8	Q
21	10	(Italy) Sebastian Colloredo	165.5	191.5	174.5	150.2	Q
22	22	(Russia) Dimitry Vassiliev	203.5	213.5	168.0	145.2	Q
23	5	(Japan) Yuta Watase	143.0	146.5	156.5	141.3	Q
24	13	(Russia) Anton Kalinitschenko	140.0	144.0	172.5	140.2	Q
25	16	(Canada) Mackenzie Boyd-Clowes	194.0	171.0	170.0	137.8	Q
26	33	(Slovenia) Jure Šinkovec	151.5	211.0	156.5	137.7	Q
27	17	(Estonia) Kaarel Nurmsalu	158.0	166.0	168.5	136.5	Q
28	23	(Poland) Maciej Kot	142.0	182.0	158.0	135.4	Q
29	14	(Czech Republic) Jan Matura	156.5	198.0	167.0	133.2	Q
30	12	(Finland) Matti Hautamäki	162.5	148.0	164.5	132.9	Q
not qualified
31	2	(Slovenia) Jernej Damjan	159.0	190.5	152.0	132.2	
32	9	(France) Emmanuel Chedal	153.5	147.5	157.5	131.9	
33	6	(Italy) Davide Bresadola	134.0	175.0	148.0	127.2	
34	15	(Russia) Dimitry Ipatov	139.5	140.0	154.5	118.8	
35	18	(Kazakhstan) Alexey Pchelintsev	137.0	153.0	152.5	110.2	
36	1	(Kazakhstan) Alexey Korolev	145.5	122.0	128.0	95.2	
37	4	(Kazakhstan) Nikolay Karpenko	138.0	137.0	124.0	88.0	
38	7	(Sweden) Carl Nordin	132.0	120.0	117.0	87.3	
39	11	(Kazakhstan) Radik Zhaparov	120.0	128.0	127.5	77.9	
prequalified
*	47	(Austria) Gregor Schlierenzauer	216.5	200.0	165.5		q
*	48	(Germany) Severin Freund	216.5	190.5	184.0		q
*	49	(Czech Republic) Roman Koudelka	204.0	204.0	169.5		q
*	50	(Switzerland) Simon Ammann	210.5	204.5	204.0		q
*	51	(Poland) Kamil Stoch	204.0	205.0	153.0		q
*	52	(Austria) Martin Koch	237.0	219.0	DNS		q
*	53	(Austria) Thomas Morgenstern	201.5	185.0	DNS		q
*	54	(Norway) Anders Bardal	193.5	185.5	166.0		q
*	55	(Slovenia) Robert Kranjec	211.5	213.0	200.0		q
*	56	(Japan) Daiki Ito	201.0	209.0	196.5		q
internal team qualification: did not enter in qualifying round
	3	(Poland) Stefan Hula	151.5	170.5	DNS		
	8	(Czech Republic) Antonin Hajek	169.0	180.5	DNS		
	19	(Slovenia) Dejan Judež	159.0	170.5	DNS		
	20	(Russia) Alexander Sardyko	122.0	138.0	DNS		
	37	(Norway) Tom Hilde	156.5	187.0	DNS		
	39	(Austria) David Zauner	197.5	207.0	DNS		
	42	(Germany) Michael Neumayer	190.5	193.5	DNS		

==== Individual ====
Men's Ski Flying individual at the FIS Ski Flying World Championships 2012
- Venue: Vikersundbakken
- Date: 24–25 February 2012
- Competitors: 40 from 14 nations
- Winning score: 408.7

Medalists
gold medal	Robert Kranjec	Slovenia
silver medal	Rune Velta	Norway
bronze medal	Martin Koch	Austria

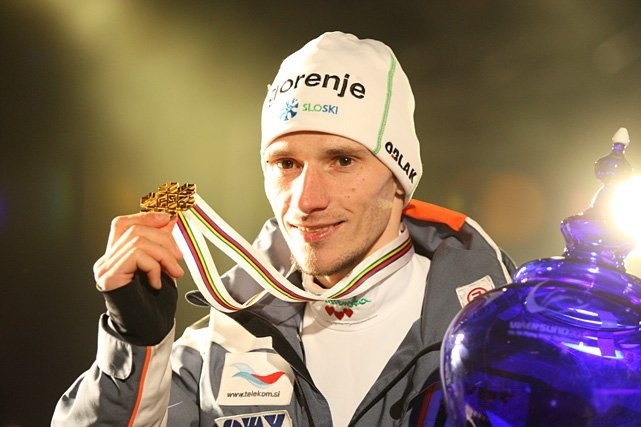
2012 FIS Ski Flying World Champion: Robert Kranjec from Slovenia

Day 1 of individual competition, at Feb 24 event was cancelled due to strong wind. At first trial round was cancelled, then after 35 jumpers 1st round was cancelled and second round also.
Day 2, at Feb 25 trial round was also cancelled, but manage to finish the 3rd and final round. That was the official result with two series in competition only instead of four series. 24–25 February 2012

Rank	Bib	Name	Distance (meters)				Total Points
Rank	Bib	Name	Day One (Feb 24)		Day Two (Feb 25)		Total Points
Rank	Bib	Name	1st Round	2nd Round	3rd Round	Final Round	Total Points
1st place, gold medalist(s)	39	(Slovenia) Robert Kranjec			217.5	244.0	408.7
2nd place, silver medalist(s)	30	(Norway) Rune Velta			217.5	234.5	405.7
3rd place, bronze medalist(s)	36	(Austria) Martin Koch			218.0	243.0	386.2
4	32	(Germany) Severin Freund			210.5	208.5	372.6
5	40	(Japan) Daiki Ito			206.0	219.0	365.2
6	27	(Austria) Andreas Kofler			228.0	216.0	364.2
7	38	(Norway) Anders Bardal			212.0	203.5	360.3
8	37	(Austria) Thomas Morgenstern			199.5	212.5	360.2
9	28	(Germany) Richard Freitag			210.0	212.0	356.3
10	35	(Poland) Kamil Stoch			191.0	211.5	353.9
11	33	(Czech Republic) Roman Koudelka			189.5	210.0	342.4
12	17	(Slovenia) Jurij Tepeš			235.5	198.0	342.0
13	22	(Norway) Anders Fannemel			244.5	179.5	329.5
14	34	(Switzerland) Simon Ammann			203.0	180.0	328.8
15	23	(Finland) Janne Happonen			215.0	194.5	328.2
16	25	(Czech Republic) Lukas Hlava			204.0	194.5	325.0
17	26	(Germany) Andreas Wank			189.5	197.5	320.0
18	31	(Austria) Gregor Schlierenzauer			206.5	174.5	317.5
19	11	(Italy) Andrea Morassi			205.5	200.5	307.2
20	14	(France) Vincent Descombes Sevoie			212.5	184.5	305.3
21	15	(Czech Republic) Jakub Janda			218.0	173.5	303.7
22	16	(Russia) Denis Kornilov			212.5	190.5	301.6
23	21	(Germany) Maximilian Mechler			204.5	191.5	301.4
24	12	(Finland) Anssi Koivuranta			209.0	194.5	300.7
25	1	(Japan) Yuta Watase			216.5	177.5	299.8
26	20	(Slovenia) Jure Šinkovec			215.0	169.5	280.5
26	3	(Finland) Matti Hautamäki			212.5	166.0	280.5
28	5	(Czech Republic) Jan Matura			208.0	157.0	276.2
29	18	(Norway) Bjørn Einar Romøren			199.5	158.5	271.2
30	19	(Finland) Olli Muotka			200.0	136.5	227.1
31	29	(Japan) Taku Takeuchi			171.5	DNQ	148.2
32	2	(Italy) Sebastian Colloredo			191.5	DNQ	147.3
33	24	(Poland) Piotr Żyła			168.0	DNQ	133.8
34	9	(Russia) Dimitry Vassiliev			186.0	DNQ	130.4
35	13	(Poland) Krzysztof Miętus			174.5	DNQ	110.9
36	6	(Canada) Mackenzie Boyd-Clowes			160.5	DNQ	107.7
37	7	(Estonia) Kaarel Nurmsalu			142.5	DNQ	92.6
38	10	(Poland) Maciej Kot			159.5	DNQ	90.1
39	8	(Japan) Shohei Tochimoto			126.0	DNQ	68.8
40	4	(Russia) Anton Kalinitschenko			132.0	DNQ	68.5

=== Team ===
Men's Ski Flying Team event at the FIS Ski Flying World Championships 2012
- Venue: Vikersundbakken
- Date: 26 February 2012
- Competitors: 40 from 10 nations
- Winning score: 1648.4

Medalists
gold medal	Austria
silver medal	Germany
bronze medal	Slovenia

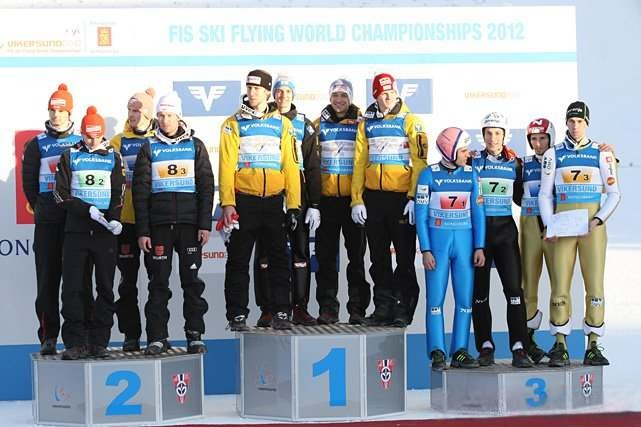
2012 FIS Ski Flying World Chp. Team podium: 2 Germany, 1 Austria, 3 Slovenia

26 February 2012

Rank	Team	Distance (meters)			Points
Rank	Team	Trial Round	1st Round	Final Round	Points
1st place, gold medalist(s)	Austria; 10-1 Thomas Morgenstern; 10-2 Andreas Kofler; 10-3 Gregor Schlierenzauer; 10-4 Martin Koch	207.5; 233.0; 192.0; 214.0	224.5; 212.5; 217.0; 217.5	225.5; 210.5; 190.5; 218.0	1648.4
2nd place, silver medalist(s)	Germany; 8-1 Andreas Wank; 8-2 Richard Freitag; 8-3 Maximilian Mechler; 8-4 Severin Freund	193.0; 218.5; 167.5; 224.5	211.0; 223.5; 199.5; 212.5	214.0; 230.0; 208.0; 213.5	1625.2
3rd place, bronze medalist(s)	Slovenia; 7-1 Jernej Damjan; 7-2 Jurij Tepeš; 7-3 Jure Šinkovec; 7-4 Robert Kranjec	194.5; 222.0; 201.0; 233.5	202.0; 202.0; 199.5; 235.5	211.0; 217.5; 208.0; 205.0	1580.4
4	Norway; 9-1 Bjørn Einar Romøren; 9-2 Anders Fannemel; 9-3 Rune Velta; 9-4 Anders Bardal	187.5; 204.0; 199.0; 202.0	196.0; 206.5; 229.0; 194.5	172.5; 199.0; 243.0; 211.0	1542.2
5	Japan; 6-1 Yuta Watase; 6-2 Shōhei Tochimoto; 6-3 Taku Takeuchi; 6-4 Daiki Ito	161.5; 186.5; 194.0; 236.5	212.0; 173.0; 200.5; 240.0	197.0; 181.0; 182.5; 215.5	1472.9
6	Czech Republic; 5-1 Jakub Janda; 5-2 Jan Matura; 5-3 Roman Koudelka; 5-4 Lukas Hlava	198.0; 170.5; 165.5; 197.0	208.0; 168.0; 224.5; 201.0	202.0; 192.5; 226.5; 164.5	1452.1
7	Poland; 4-1 Maciej Kot; 4-2 Piotr Żyła; 4-3 Krzysztof Miętus; 4-4 Kamil Stoch	162.5; 213.5; 122.0; 179.5	174.0; 223.0; 190.5; 208.0	178.5; 232.5; 202.0; 196.5	1444.5
8	Finland; 2-1 Janne Happonen; 2-2 Olli Muotka; 2-3 Matti Hautamäki; 2-4 Anssi Koivuranta	221.5; 213.0; 202.5; 200.0	208.0; 220.5; 207.5; 185.0	202.5; 219.5; 176.5; 168.5	1421.7
9	Russia; 3-1 Denis Kornilov; 3-2 Dimitry Ipatov; 3-3 Anton Kalinitschenko; 3-4 Dimitry Vassiliev	215.5; 143.5; 139.0; 197.5	207.0; DSQ; 151.5; 179.5	DNQ; DNQ; DNQ; DNQ	459.0
10	Kazakhstan; 1-1 Alexey Korolev; 1-2 Alexey Pchelintsev; 1-3 Yevgeniy Levkin; 1-4 Radik Zhaparov	132.0; 141.0; 123.0; 109.0	136.0; 150.0; 115.0; 113.5	DNQ; DNQ; DNQ; DNQ	342.9

== Medal table ==
Rank	Nation	Gold	Silver	Bronze	Total
1	Austria (AUT)	1	0	1	2
1	Slovenia (SVN)	1	0	1	2
3	Germany (GER)	0	1	0	1
3	Norway (NOR)	0	1	0	1
Totals (4 entries)		2	2	2	6
