= Jurić =

Jurić (pronounced [jǔːritɕ]) is a Croatian surname derived from the masculine name Jure, Jura or Juraj with the patronymic-forming suffix -ić/-ič.

It is the fifth most common surname in Croatia.

It may refer to:

- Ante Jurić, (1922–2012), Croatian priest
- Ante Jurić, (1934–2013), Croatian footballer
- Ante Juric (born 1973), Australian footballer
- Deni Juric (born 1997), Croatian-Australian footballer
- Duje Jurić (born 1956), Croatian artist
- Frank Juric (born 1973), Australian footballer
- Goran Jurić (born 1963), Croatian footballer
- Ivan Jurić (born 1975), Croatian football coach and former player
- Marija Jurić Zagorka (1873–1957), Croatian journalist, novelist and dramatist
- Mario Jurić (born 1979), Croatian astronomer
- Mario Jurić (born 1976), Bosnian footballer
- Predrag Jurić (born 1965), Yugoslav and Bosnian footballer
- Stipe Jurić (born 1998), Bosnian footballer
- Tomi Juric (born 1991), Australian footballer
- Tomislav Jurić (born 1990), Croatian footballer
- Zvonimir Jurić (born 1971), Croatian film director

== See also ==
- Đurić, a surname
- Jurčević, a surname
- Jurčić, a surname
- Juričić, a surname
