= Jurek =

Jurek may refer to:

- Jurek (given name)
- Jurek (surname)
- a nom de guerre of Izrael Chaim Wilner (1917–1943), Jewish resistance fighter in World War II Poland
- nom de guerre of Jerzy Zborowski (1922–1944), World War II Polish resistance fighter

== See also ==
- Jerzy
