= Juraj =

Juraj is a given name used in a number of Slavic languages, including Czech, Slovak, and Croatian.

The English equivalent of the name is George.

== Notable people ==
- Juraj Bartusz (1933–2025), Slovak sculptor
- Juraj Chmiel (born 1960), Czech diplomat and politician
- Juraj Dobrila (1812–1882), Croatian bishop and benefactor
- Juraj Filas (1955–2021), Slovak composer
- György Gyimesi (born Juraj Gyimesi 1980), Slovak politician
- Juraj Habdelić (1609–1678), Croatian writer and lexicographer
- Juraj Herz (1934–2018), Slovak director
- Juraj Hromkovič (born 1958), Slovak computer scientist
- Juraj Jakubisko (1938–2023), Slovak director
- Juraj Jánošík (1688–1713), Slovak national hero
- Juraj Križanić (1618–1683), Croatian Catholic missionary and first pan-Slavist
- Juraj Kucka (born 1987), Slovak footballer
- Juraj Lexmann (1941–2025), Slovak musicologist and composer
- Juraj Okoličány (1943–2008), Slovak ice hockey referee
- Juraj Slafkovský (born 2004), Slovak ice hockey player
- Juraj Soboňa (1961–2025), Slovak politician
- Josip Juraj Strossmayer (1815–1905), Croatian politician, Roman Catholic bishop
- Juraj Sviatko (born 1980), Slovak figure skater
- Juraj Šeliga (born 1990), Slovak politician

== Derived forms ==
- Jura: Czech, Slovak, Moravian, Croatian and Romanian
- Jure: Croatian, Slovene
- Jurica: Croatian
- Jurášek: Czech, Moravian
- Jurajko: Ukrainian, Slovak
- Jurik: Russian and Armenian
- Jurko: Slovak, Croatian
- Juro: Slovak, Croatian
- Jurek: Polish, Croatian

== See also ==
- Other Slavic variants of George: Jurij, Yury, Đurađ, Đuro, Đuraš, Jerzy, Jiří
