= Juranović =

Juranović is a Croatian surname, probably derived from the name Jura or Juran. It is most common among Bosnian Croats in Kotor Varoš and Kozibrod (near Hrvatska Kostajnica). It is mentioned as early as of 1750, in Croatian taxpayer list.

In Croatian diaspora it is present in forms Juranovic, Juranovich and Yuranovich.

People with the surname include:

- Dragan Juranović, a Croatian footballer
- Josip Juranović, a Croatian footballer
