= Jurcic =

Jurcic may refer to:

- Jurčić (pronounced [jûːrtʃitɕ]), Croatian surname
- Jurčič (pronounced [jûːrtʃitʃ]), Slovene surname
