= Jure (given name) =

Jure is a South Slavic masculine given name found in Slovenia and Croatia.

It is cognate to the names Juraj and Jurij, in turn cognate to George in English.

Notable people with the name include:

- Jure Balažič (born 1980), Slovenian basketball player
- Jure Balkovec (born 1994), Slovenian football player
- Jure Bilić (1922–2006), Yugoslav politician
- Jure Bogdan (born 1955), Croatian bishop
- Jure Brkljača (born 1994), Croatian singer
- Jure Čolak (born 1989), Croatian-German football player
- Jure Detela (1951–1992) was a Slovene poet, writer, and essayist
- Jure Dobelšek (born 1984), Slovenian handball player
- Jure Dolenc (1908–1963), American film actor of Slovene descent
- Jure Dolenec (born 1988), Slovenian handball player
- Jure Francetić (1912–1942), Croatian fascist
- Jure Godler (born 1984), Slovenian writer, actor, composer and comedian
- Jure Golčer (born 1977), Slovenian cyclist
- Jure Grando (1579–1656), Istrian villager
- Jure Guvo (born 1977), Croatian football player
- Jure Ivanković (born 1985), Bosnian football manager
- Jure Kocjan (born 1984), Slovenian road racing cyclist
- Jure Košir (born 1972), Slovenian alpine skier
- Jure Lalić (born 1986), Croatian basketball player
- Jure Lenarčič (born 1990), Slovenian canoeist
- Jure Leskovec, Slovenian computer scientist
- Jure Matjašič (born 1992), Slovenian football player
- Jure Meglič (born 1984), Slovenian slalom canoeist
- Jure Milina (born 1987), Croatian football player
- Jure Močnik (born 1985), Slovenian basketball player
- Jure Obšivač (born 1990), Croatian football player
- Jure Pavic (born 1975), Croatian football player
- Jure Pavlič (born 1963), Yugoslav cyclist
- Jure Pavlović (born 1985), Croatian film director
- Jure Pelivan (1928–2014), Bosnian Croat politician and economist
- Jure Primorac (born 1981), Croatian-born French football player
- Jure Radelj (born 1977), Slovenian ski jumper
- Jure Radić (priest) (1920–1990), Croatian scientist and priest
- Jure Radić (engineer) (1953–2016), Croatian civil engineer and politician
- Jure Ritlop (born 1995), Slovenian basketball player
- Jure Robič (1965–2010), Slovenian cyclist and soldier
- Jure Rupnik, Slovenian cyclist
- Jure Šinkovec (born 1985), Slovenian ski jumper
- Jure Šterk (1937–2009) was a Slovenian long-distance sailor
- Jure Velepec (born 1965), Slovenian biathlete
- Jure Zdovc (born 1966), Slovenian basketball player and coach
- Jure Zrimšek (born 1982), Slovenian cyclist
- Jure Zupan, Slovenian physicist

== See also ==
- Jurre, a Dutch masculine given name
