= Jerzy =

- Pronunciation: Polish: [ˈjɛʐɨ]
- Gender: masculine
- Language: Polish

Origin
- Region of origin: Poland

Other names
- Nickname: Jurek
- Related names: George

Jerzy is the Polish version of the masculine given name George. The most common nickname for Jerzy is Jurek (Polish: [ˈjurɛk]), which may also be used as an official first name. Occasionally the nickname Jerzyk may be used, which means "swift" in Polish.

== People ==
- Jerzy, nom de guerre of Ryszard Białous, Polish World War II resistance fighter
- Jerzy Andrzejewski, Polish writer
- Jerzy Bartmiński, Polish linguist and ethnologist
- Jerzy Braun (disambiguation), several people
- Jerzy Brzęczek, Polish footballer and manager
- Jerzy Buzek, Polish politician and former Prime Minister and former President of the European Parliament
- Jerzy Dudek, Polish footballer
- Jerzy Fedorowicz, Polish actor and theatre director
- Jerzy Ficowski, Polish poet and translator
- Jerzy Grotowski, Polish theatre director and theorist
- Jerzy Hoffman, Polish film director, screenwriter, and producer
- Jerzy Jarniewicz, Polish poet, literary critic, translator and essayist
- Jerzy Janiszewski, Polish artist
- Jerzy Janowicz, Polish tennis player
- Jerzy Jurka, Polish-American computational and molecular biologist
- Jerzy Kawalerowicz, Polish film director
- Jerzy Kosiński, Polish-American novelist
- Jerzy Kukuczka, Polish mountain climber
- Jerzy Kulej, Polish boxer and sports commentator
- Jerzy Kuźmienko, Polish architect
- Jerzy Neyman, Polish mathematician
- Jerzy Owsiak, Polish social activist
- Jerzy Pilch, Polish novelist, journalist, and columnist
- Jerzy Pniewski, Polish physicist
- Jerzy Połomski, Polish singer
- Jerzy Popiełuszko, Polish priest assassinated by the Security Service and beatified in the Catholic Church
- Jerzy Potz, Polish ice hockey player
- Jerzy Różycki, Polish mathematician and cryptologist
- Jerzy Sandera, Polish slalom canoer
- Jerzy Semkow, Polish conductor
- Jerzy Stuhr, Polish actor
- Jerzy Sztwiertnia, Polish screenwriter and director
- Jerzy Urban, Polish journalist and commentator
- Jerzy Vetulani, Polish neuroscientist
- Jerzy Waldorff, Polish media personality

== See also ==
- Jerzy the Giant, the second album by "The Terrible Twos"
- Jurek (disambiguation)
- Agnieszka Jerzyk
