= Jurre =

Jurre is a masculine given name. Notable people with the name include:

- Jurre van Aken (born 2003), Dutch footballer
- Jurre van Doeselaar (born 1987), Dutch EDM producer and DJ, half of Firebeatz
- Jurre Vreman (born 1998), Dutch footballer

== See also ==
- Jure (given name)
- Johannes Hendricus Jurres (1875–1946), Dutch painter
