= Jurica =

Jurica is a Croatian given name. Notable people with the name include:

- Jurica Buljat (born 1986), Croatian football defender, currently playing for Maccabi Haifa
- Jurica Golemac (born 1977), Slovenian professional basketball player
- Jurica Grabušić (born 1983), Croatian athlete who specializes in the 110 metre hurdles
- Jurica Jerković (1950–2019), former Croatian footballer
- Jurica Pađen, (born 1955), Croatian singer and guitarist
- Jurica Pavičić (born 1965), Croatian writer and journalist
- Jurica Pavlic (born 1989), Croatian speedway rider
- Jurica Puljiz (born 1979), Croatian football defender
- Jurica Siljanoski (born 1973), ethnic Macedonian professional footballer
- Jurica Vranješ (born 1980), Croatian football midfielder
- Jurica Vučko (born 1976), Croatian football striker

== See also ==
- Neven Jurica (born 1952), Croatian politician; Jurica is here the surname
- Jura
- Juraj
