= Jurčević =

Jurčević is a common Croatian surname. It may refer to:

- Josip Jurčević (born 1951), Croatian historian and politician
- Lana Jurčević (born 1984), Croatian pop singer
- Mladen Jurčević (born 1983), Bosnian footballer
- Nikola Jurčević (born 1966), retired Croatian football player and manager
- Ivan Jurčević (born 2000), Croatian basketball player

== See also ==
- Jurić, a surname
- Đurčević, a surname
