= Juričić =

Juričić is a surname. Notable people with the surname include:

- Bruno Juričić (born 1977), Croatian architect
- Darko Juričić (born 1969), Croatian athlete
- Filip Juričić (born 1981), Croatian actor
- Ignacio Juricic, Chilean film director
- Igor Juričić (born 1974), Croatian volleyball player and coach
- Juraj Juričić (?–1578), Croatian-Slovene Protestant preacher and translator
- Luka Juričić (born 1983), Croatian actor
- Mato Juričić (Matthew Yuricich), Academy Award-winning special effects artist.
- Richard Yuricich (born 1942), Academy Award-nominated special effects artist.
- Srećko Juričić (born 1954), Croatian former professional football player

== See also ==
- Jurčić
- Jurić
