= Jurčić =

Jurčić (pronounced [jûːrtʃitɕ]) is a Croatian surname. Notable people with the surname include:

- Andrea Jurčić (born 1972), Croatian badminton and volleyball player
- Krunoslav Jurčić (born 1969), Croatian football player and manager
- Ljubo Jurčić (born 1954), Croatian economist and politician

== See also ==
- Jurić
- Juričić
