= Lisa Demetz =

Italian ski jumper

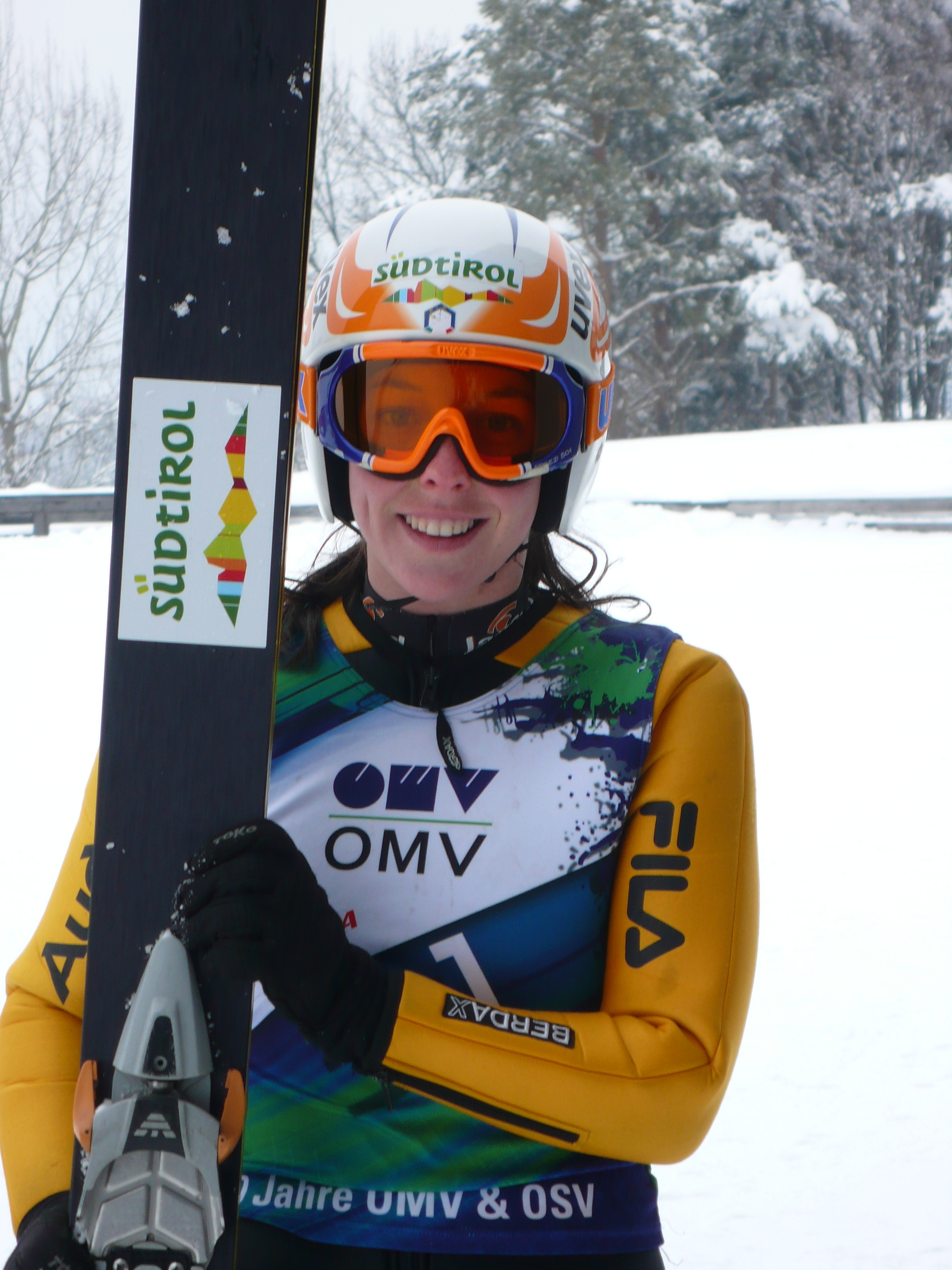
Lisa Demetz

Lisa Demetz (born 21 May 1989) is an Italian ski jumper who represents as a military athlete the C.S. Esercito.

Demetz, born in Bolzano, made her debut in the Continental Cup, the highest level in women's ski jumping, on 23 July 2004 with an 11th place in Park City. She has finished among the top three 4 times, with one win and two second places.

She was selected to compete for Italy in the 2011 World Championship in Oslo.

Further notable results

- 2004: 2nd, Italian championships of ski jumping, K62
- 2005:
  - 1st, Italian championships of ski jumping
  - 1st, Italian championships of ski jumping, K60
- 2007: 1st, Italian championships of ski jumping
- 2008: 2nd, Italian championships of ski jumping
- 2009: 1st, Italian championships of ski jumping
- 2010: 1st, Italian championships of ski jumping
- 2011: 1st, Italian championships of ski jumping
