= Jerzy Kuźmienko =

- Died: Warsaw
- Education: Warsaw University of Technology
- Occupation: Architect
- Buildings: Church of Divine Mercy in Kalisz (1957)
- Projects: Multi-family building at 18a Karowa Street in Warsaw (1978)

Jerzy Kuźmienko (born 17 September or 18 1931) was a Polish architect, urban planner and university teacher.

== Biography ==
In 1965 Kuźmienko graduated from the Warsaw University of Technology with a degree in architecture, and stayed on teaching drawing from 1967 to 1973. In 1969, he became a member of the Polish Society of Urbanists. Kuźmienko was also a member of the Association of Polish Architects (SARP) and the regional Chamber of Architects. Kuźmienko was involved in the design of large residential complexes such as the housing estates Gocław and Służew nad Dolinką, 9 Kozia Street, and 18a Karowa Street in Warsaw.

In 2009, the Museum of Architecture in Wrocław showed an exhibition of his drawings under the title Jerzy Kuźmienko. 55 years of creative work.
