= Anton Kalinitschenko =

Russian ski jumper (born 1982)

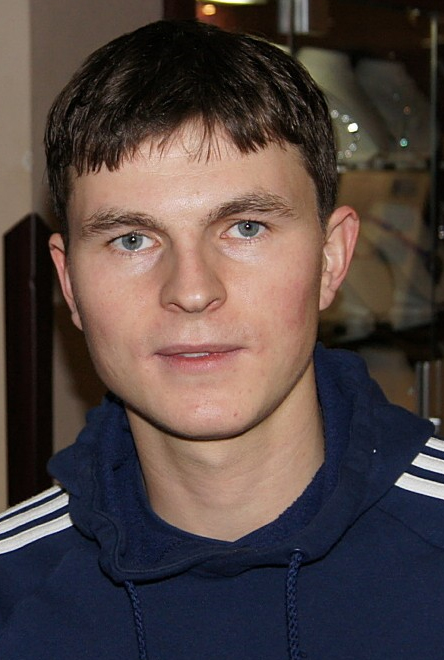

Personal information
- Full name: Anton Kalinitschenko
- Born: 22 July 1982 (age 43) Kemerovo, Russian SFSR, Soviet Union

Sport
- Sport: Skiing

World Cup career
- Seasons: 2001–2002; 2012–present
- Indiv. podiums: 1 Team
- Updated on 30 Mar 2015

Anton Kalinitschenko (born 22 July 1982) is a Russian ski jumper. He competed in the large hill event at the 2002 Winter Olympics.
