= Jurek (surname) =

Jurek is a surname. Notable people with the surname include:

- Eszter Jurek (born 1936), Hungarian figure skater and coach
- Gábor Jurek (born 2004), Hungarian footballer
- Kazimierz Jurek (born 1964), Polish ice hockey player
- Marek Jurek (born 1960), Polish politician
- Miroslav Jurek (born 1935), Czech long-distance runner
- Monika Jurek (born 1967), Polish teacher and politician
- Richard Jurek, American author, numismatist and business executive
- Scott Jurek (born 1973), American ultramarathoner, author and public speaker
