= Jurek (given name) =

Jurek is a Polish masculine given name, the most common diminutive form (hypocorism) of Jerzy. It may refer to:

- Jurek Becker (1937–1997), Polish-born German writer, screenwriter and East German dissident
- Jerzy Jurek Dybał (born 1977), Polish conductor and double-bassist
- Jurek Jatowitt (born 1952), Austrian judoka
- Jurek Martin (born 1942), British-born journalist
- Jurek Stasiak (born 1978), Australian tennis player
- Jurek Wajdowicz (born 1951), Polish-born American artist, graphic designer, photographer and art director
