= Jura (given name) =

Jura may refer to:

- Jura Levy (born 1990), Jamaican sprinter
- Jura Pađen (born 1955), Croatian singer and guitarist
- Jura Soyfer (1912–1939), Austrian political journalist and cabaret writer
- Jura Stublić (born 1953), Croatian singer-songwriter

== See also ==
- Juraj
- Jurica
