= Jure Šinkovec =

Slovenian ski jumper

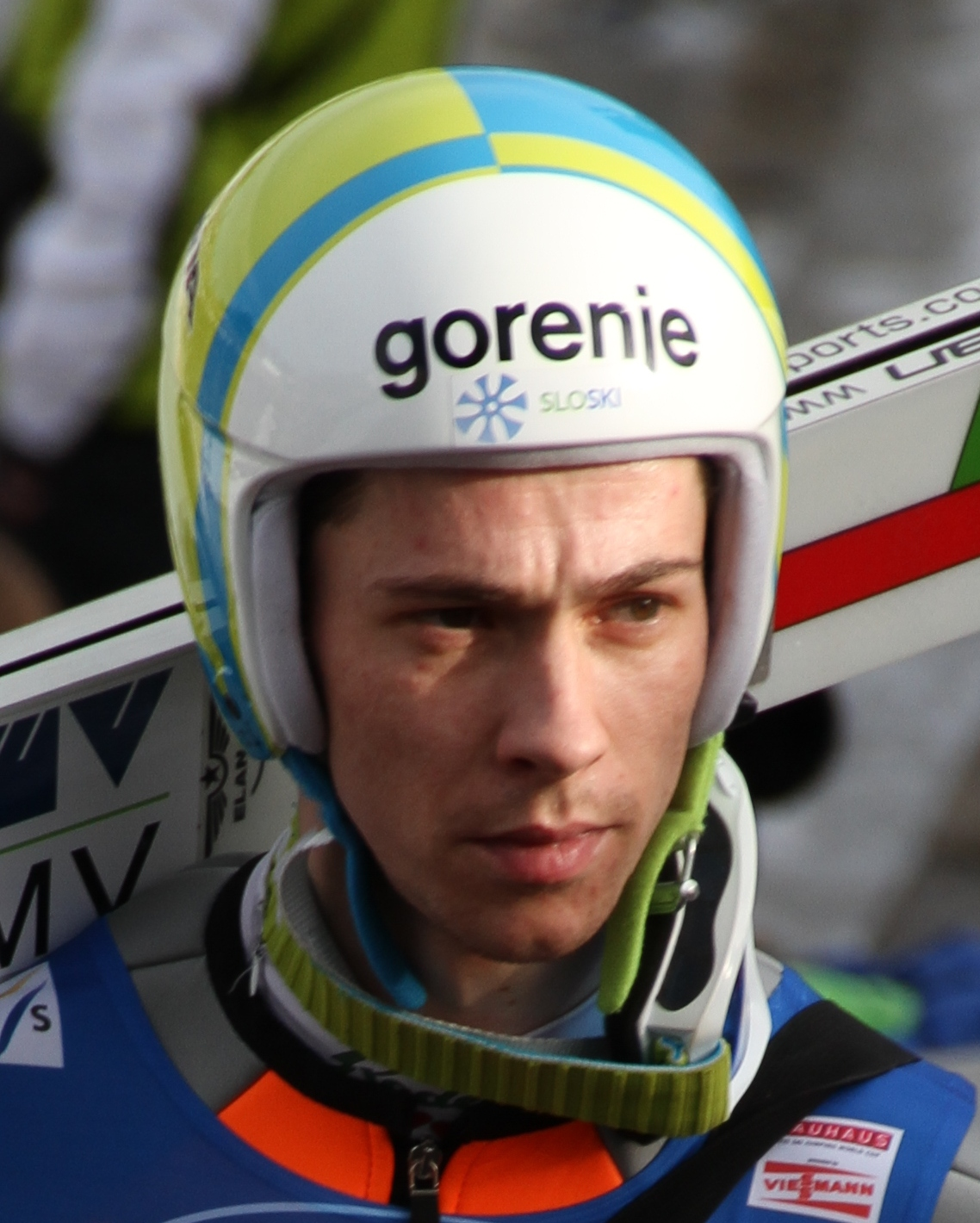

Personal information
- Born: 3 July 1985 (age 41) Ljubljana, SR Slovenia, SFR Yugoslavia

Sport
- Sport: Skiing
- Club: SSK SAM Ihan

World Cup career
- Seasons: 2005–

Achievements and titles
- Personal best: 215 m (Vikersund 2012)
Medal record
Men's ski flying
Representing Slovenia
Ski flying World Championships
Bronze medal – third place	2012 Vikersund	Team

Jure Šinkovec (born 3 July 1985) is a Slovenian ski jumper who has competed since 2005.

Šinkovec's first podium in World Cup was in a team competition in Harrachov HS 142m in December 2011. His best result in World Cup is 1st place in Oberstdorf 2012 ski flying competition on team event, together with Jurij Tepeš, Peter Prevc, and Robert Kranjec. That was the first win for Slovenian ski jumping on World Cup team events.
