= Shōhei Tochimoto =

Japanese ski jumper (born 1989)

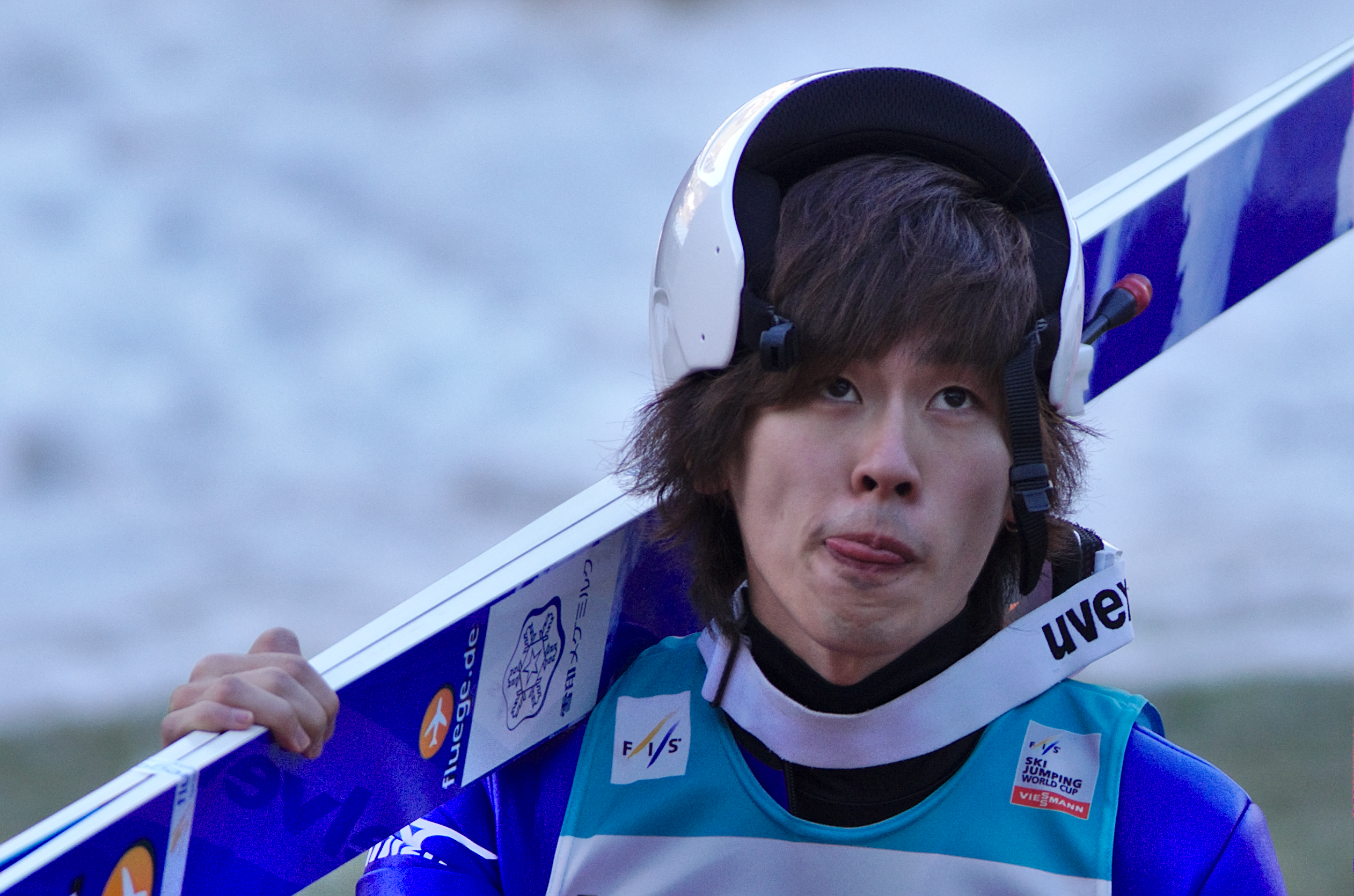

Personal information
- Born: 21 December 1989 (age 36) Sapporo, Japan

Sport
- Sport: Skiing
- Club: Sjoshi Gaken High School

World Cup career
- Seasons: 2006-
- Indiv. podiums: 0
- Indiv. wins: 0
Medal record
Men's ski jumping
World Championships
Bronze medal – third place	2007 Sapporo	Team large hill
Bronze medal – third place	2009 Liberec	Team large hill

Shōhei Tochimoto (栃本 翔平, Tochimoto Shōhei; born 21 December 1989) is a Japanese ski jumper who has been competing since 2004. At the FIS Nordic World Ski Championships, he won two bronze medals in the team large hill (2007, 2009).

As of 2007, his best World Cup finish is 6th at Kuusamo in 2009. Tochimoto's best individual finish was third at an FIS Cup competition at Sapporo in 2006.

At the 2010 Winter Olympics in Vancouver, he finished fifth in the team large hill, 37th in the individual normal hill, and 45th in the individual large hill events.
