= Vegard Haukø Sklett =

Norwegian former ski jumper (born 1986)

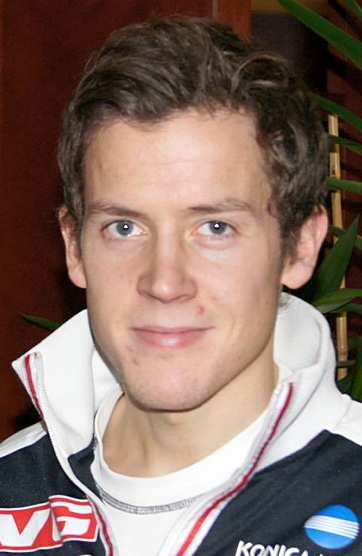

Personal information
- Full name: Vegard Haukø Sklett
- Born: 10 February 1986 (age 40)
- Height: 5 ft 7 in (1.70 m)

Sport
- Sport: Skiing
- Club: Grong IL

World Cup career
- Seasons: 2009-2013
- Indiv. wins: 0
- Updated on 1 February 2009

Vegard Haukø Sklett (born 10 February 1986) is a Norwegian former ski jumper.

He made his Continental Cup debut in August 2007, his best result being the victories from Sapporo and Bischofshofen in January 2009. He made his World Cup debut in January 2009 in Sapporo, finishing 24th.
