= Maximilian Mechler =

German ski jumper (born 1984)

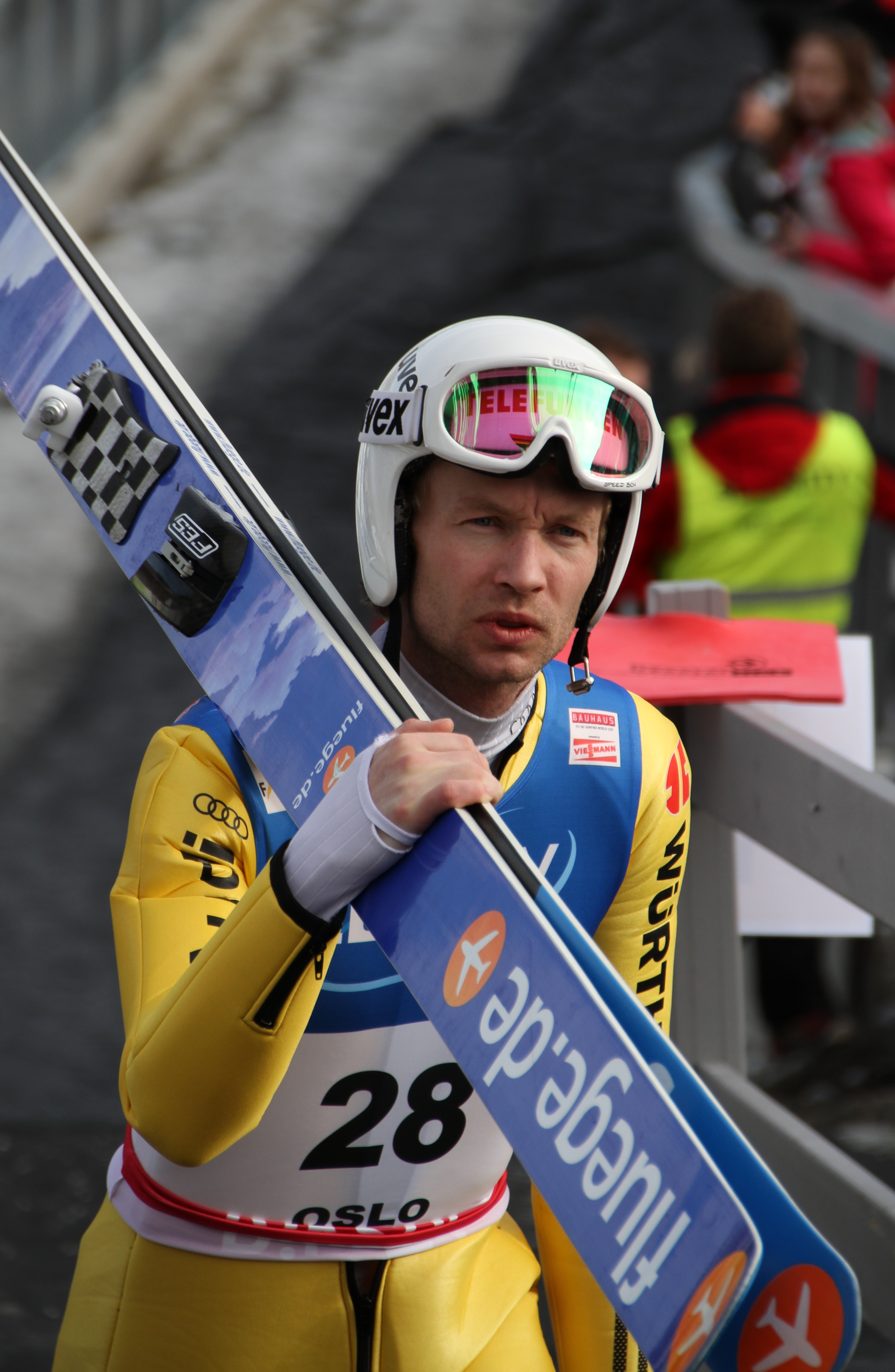
- Mechler in Oslo, 2012

Personal information
- Full name: Maximilian Mechler
- Nationality: Germany
- Born: 3 January 1984 (age 42) Isny, Germany

Sport
- Sport: Skiing
- Club: WSV Isny

World Cup career
- Seasons: 2000; 2003–2007; 2010–2014
- Indiv. podiums: 1
- Team podiums: 4
- Team wins: 1

Achievements and titles
- Personal bests: 216 m (709 ft); Vikersund, 11 Feb 2011
Medal record
Men's ski flying
Ski Flying Championships
Silver medal – second place	2012 Vikersund	Team

Maximilian Mechler (born 3 January 1984) is a German ski jumper who has competed since 2000. His career best achievement is a silver medal at the 2012 Ski Flying Championships in Vikersund. At World Cup level, Mechler's best individual finish is third in Trondheim on 6 December 2003 and victory in a team event in Willingen on 8 January 2005.
