= Richard Freitag =

German ski jumper (born 1991)

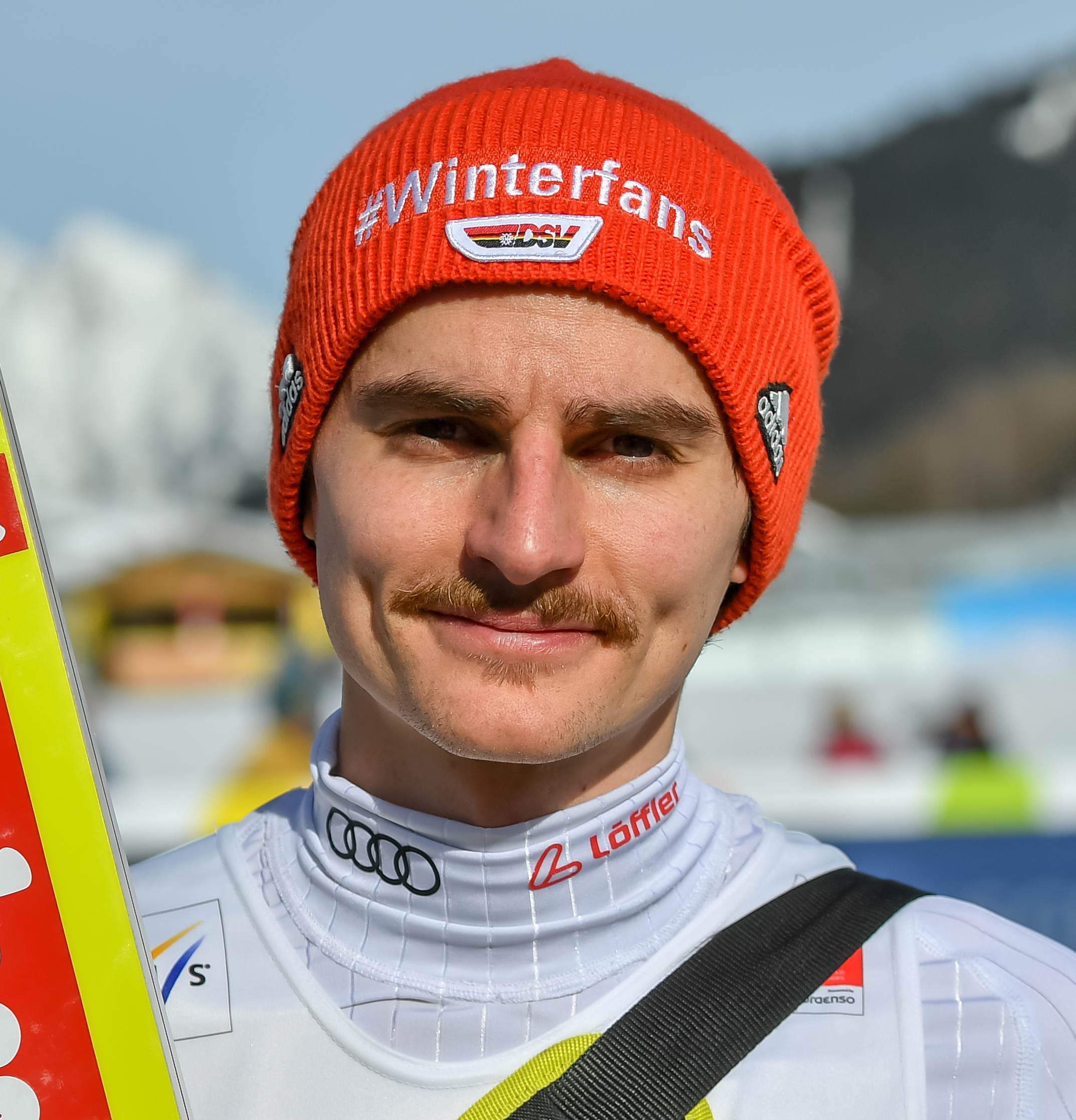
- Freitag in 2019

Personal information
- Nationality: Germany
- Born: 14 August 1991 (age 34) Erlabrunn, Germany
- Height: 1.73 m (5 ft 8 in)

Sport
- Sport: Skiing
- Club: SG Nickelhuette Aue

World Cup career
- Seasons: 2010–2022
- Indiv. starts: 221
- Indiv. podiums: 23
- Indiv. wins: 8
- Team starts: 49
- Team podiums: 30
- Team wins: 8

Achievements and titles
- Personal bests: 243 m (797 ft); Planica, 24 March 2018
Medal record
Men's ski jumping
Olympic Games
Silver medal – second place	2018 Pyeongchang	Team LH
World Championships
Gold medal – first place	2015 Falun	Mixed team NH
Gold medal – first place	2019 Seefeld	Team LH
Silver medal – second place	2013 Val di Fiemme	Team LH
Bronze medal – third place	2013 Val di Fiemme	Mixed team NH
Men's ski flying
Ski Flying World Championships
Silver medal – second place	2012 Vikersund	Team
Silver medal – second place	2016 Bad Mitterndorf	Team
Bronze medal – third place	2018 Oberstdorf	Individual

Richard "Richi" Freitag (pronounced [ˈʁɪçaʁt ˈfʁaɪtaːk]; born 14 August 1991) is a German former ski jumper who competed at World Cup level from 2010 to 2022. He was runner-up in the overall 2017–18 Ski Jumping World Cup, and won the bronze medal at the 2018 Ski Flying World Championships.

== Career ==
His FIS Ski Jumping World Cup debut took place on 29 December 2009 at the Four Hills Tournament in Oberstdorf, having previously gained success in the Continental Cup. On 3 January 2010, he succeeded in Innsbruck with a 30th place-his first World Cup point. At the FIS Ski-Flying World Championships 2010 in Planica he reached the 28th place in the individual event. In his second season, he won the third place with the German team in Oberstdorf in 2011. At the beginning of the 2011/2012 World Cup, he finished 9th in Kuusamo. In Lillehammer on 3 December 2011 he reached the second rank, his first podium placing. A week later he won the competition on the large hill in Harrachov ahead of Thomas Morgenstern and his teammate Severin Freund. At the same jump, his father Holger Freitag celebrated his only World Cup victory on 8 January 1983. On 20 January he clinched 2nd spot in Polish Zakopane, behind home favorite Kamil Stoch, securing his 3rd individual podium of his career.

At the Winter Olympics 2018 in Pyeongchang, together with his German team mates Karl Geiger, Stephan Leyhe, and Andreas Wellinger he won the silver medal in the team large hill competition.

== Record ==
=== Olympic Games ===
Year	Place	Normal hill	Large hill	Team
2018	(South Korea) Pyeongchang	9	9	2nd place, silver medalist(s)

=== Nordic World Ski Championships ===
Year	Place	Normal hill	Large hill	Team LH	Mixed team
2011	(Norway) Oslo	—	15	4	—
2013	(Italy) Val di Fiemme	6	6	2nd place, silver medalist(s)	3rd place, bronze medalist(s)
2015	(Sweden) Falun	7	15	5	1st place, gold medalist(s)
2017	(Finland) Lahti	9	19	4	—
2019	(Austria) Seefeld	5	9	1st place, gold medalist(s)	—

=== Ski Flying World Championships ===
Year	Place	Individual	Team
2010	(Slovenia) Planica	28	7
2012	(Norway) Vikersund	9	2nd place, silver medalist(s)
2016	(Austria) Bad Mitterndorf	8	2nd place, silver medalist(s)
2018	(Germany) Oberstdorf	3rd place, bronze medalist(s)	4

== World Cup ==
=== Standings ===
Season	Overall	4H	SF	RA	W5	T5	P7	NT
2009/10	90	38	—	N/A	N/A	N/A	N/A	—
2010/11	38	17	52	N/A	N/A	N/A	N/A	N/A
2011/12	6	10	11	N/A	N/A	N/A	N/A	N/A
2012/13	8	11	13	N/A	N/A	N/A	N/A	N/A
2013/14	24	24	—	N/A	N/A	N/A	N/A	N/A
2014/15	12	6	19	N/A	N/A	N/A	N/A	N/A
2015/16	9	9	13	N/A	N/A	N/A	N/A	N/A
2016/17	13	11	17	15	N/A	N/A	N/A	N/A
2017/18	2nd place, silver medalist(s)	27	7	7	11	N/A	5	N/A
2018/19	21	14	21	32	9	N/A	18	N/A
2019/20	44	—	—	—	31	—	—	N/A
2020/21	69	45	—	Cnx	—	—	—	N/A
2021/22	59	—	—	—	—	—	—	N/A

=== Wins ===
No.	Season	Date	Location	Hill	Size
1	2011/12	11 December 2011	(Czech Republic) Harrachov	Čerťák HS142	LH
2	2012/13	16 February 2013	(Germany) Oberstdorf	Heini-Klopfer-Skiflugschanze HS213 (night)	FH
3	2012/13	10 March 2013	(Finland) Lahti	Salpausselkä HS130	LH
4	2014/15	20 December 2014	(Switzerland) Engelberg	Gross-Titlis-Schanze HS137	LH
5	2014/15	4 January 2015	(Austria) Innsbruck	Bergiselschanze HS130	LH
6	2017/18	2 December 2017	(Russia) Nizhny Tagil	Tramplin Stork HS134 (night)	LH
7	2017/18	10 December 2017	(Germany) Titisee-Neustadt	Hochfirstschanze HS142 (night)	LH
8	2017/18	17 December 2017	(Switzerland) Engelberg	Gross-Titlis-Schanze HS140	LH
