= Anders Bardal =

Norwegian ski jumper (born 1982)

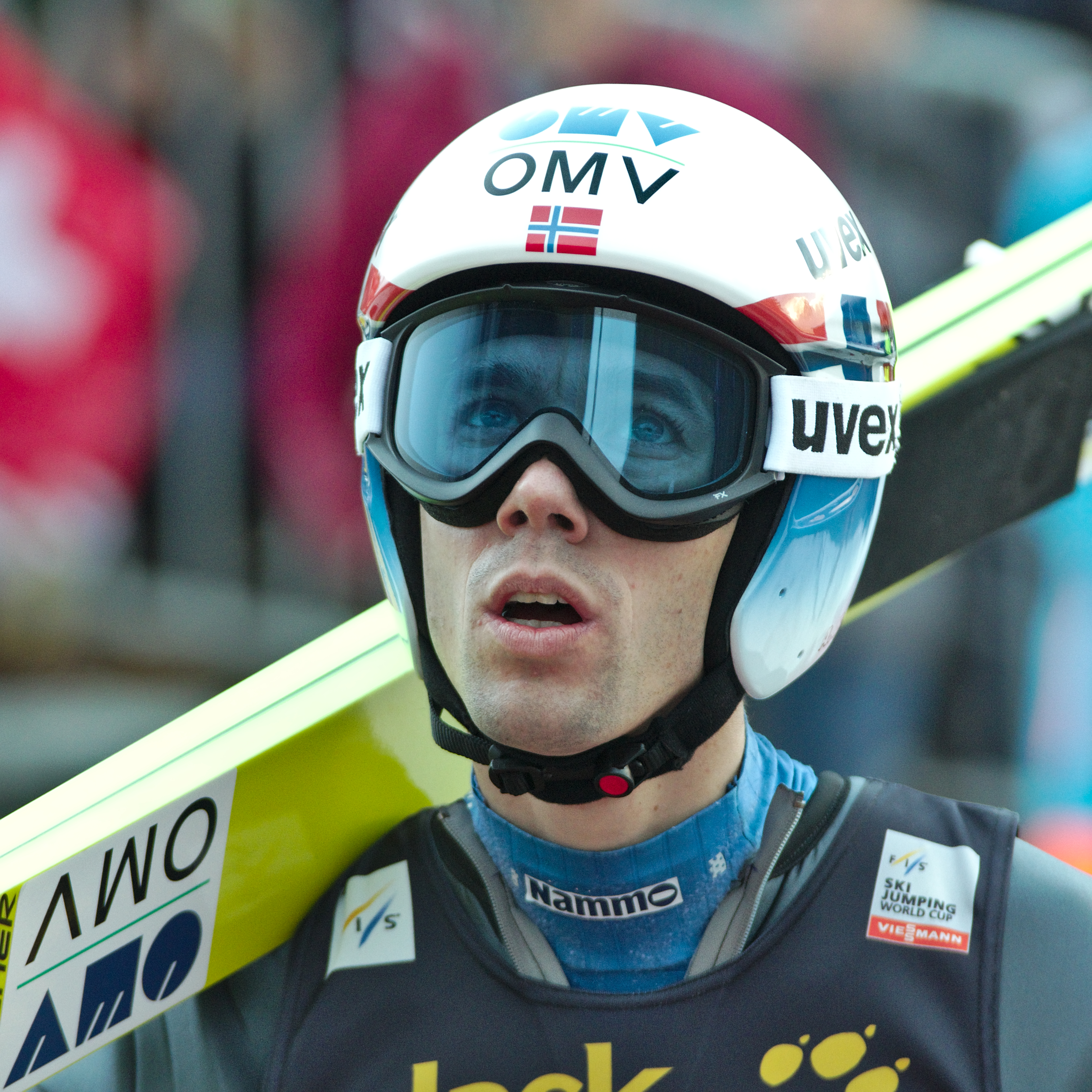
- Bardal in Engelberg, 2014

Personal information
- Nationality: Norway
- Born: 24 August 1982 (age 43) Steinkjer, Norway
- Height: 1.86 m (6 ft 1 in)

Sport
- Sport: Skiing

World Cup career
- Seasons: 2001–2015
- Indiv. starts: 287
- Indiv. podiums: 34
- Indiv. wins: 7
- Team starts: 39
- Team podiums: 26
- Team wins: 10
- Overall titles: 1 (2012)

Achievements and titles
- Personal bests: 230 m (750 ft); Planica, 15 March 2008
Medal record
Men's ski jumping
Olympic Games
| Bronze medal – third place | 2010 Vancouver | Team LH |
| Bronze medal – third place | 2014 Sochi | Individual NH |
FIS Nordic World Ski Championships
| Gold medal – first place | 2013 Val di Fiemme | Individual NH |
| Gold medal – first place | 2015 Falun | Team LH |
| Silver medal – second place | 2007 Sapporo | Team LH |
| Silver medal – second place | 2009 Liberec | Team LH |
| Silver medal – second place | 2011 Oslo | Team NH |
| Silver medal – second place | 2011 Oslo | Team LH |
| Silver medal – second place | 2015 Falun | Mixed team NH |
Men's ski flying
FIS Ski Flying World Championships
| Silver medal – second place | 2010 Planica | Team |
| Silver medal – second place | 2014 Harrachov | Individual |
| Bronze medal – third place | 2008 Oberstdorf | Team |
- Updated on 10 February 2016

Anders Bardal (Urban East Norwegian: [ˈɑ̂nːəʂ ˈbɑ̀ːɖɑːɫ]; born 24 August 1982) is a Norwegian former ski jumper.

== Career ==
He participated in the 2002 Winter Olympics in Salt Lake City, finishing 25th on the individual large hill. He was also part of the Norwegian team that finished ninth on the team large hill at those same games. Bardal won his first individual Ski jumping World Cup event in Zakopane on 27 January 2008.

He won four silver medals in the team large hill event at the Ski Jumping World Championships (2007, 2009, and two medals on both normal and large hills in 2011). At the 2008 Ski Flying World Championships in Oberstdorf, he won a bronze in the team event, and in 2010, in the team event as well, he achieved a silver. Same year, he was part of the Norwegian team that won bronze in the team large hill at the 2010 Winter Olympics in Vancouver.

In 2012 he won the overall World Cup, becoming the first Norwegian to win it since Espen Bredesen in 1993/94. A year later, at the 2013 Ski Jumping World Championships in Val di Fiemme, he won a gold medal on the normal hill.

At the 2014 Winter Olympics in Sochi, he won a bronze in the individual normal hill event. He currently lives in Trondheim with his wife, and their daughter and son. He studies at Trondheim Business School. Bardal retired from ski jumping at the end of the 2014/15 season.

== World Cup ==
=== Standings ===
| Season | Overall | 4H | SF | NT |
|---|---|---|---|---|
| 2000/01 | 53 | — | N/A | 22 |
| 2001/02 | 36 | 35 | N/A | 15 |
| 2002/03 | 42 | 34 | N/A | 44 |
| 2003/04 | 32 | 33 | N/A | 16 |
| 2004/05 | 54 | — | N/A | 41 |
| 2005/06 | 27 | 38 | N/A | 36 |
| 2006/07 | 16 | 23 | N/A | 15 |
| 2007/08 | 5 | 7 | N/A | 5 |
| 2008/09 | 10 | 29 | 10 | 16 |
| 2009/10 | 36 | — | 33 | 16 |
| 2010/11 | 14 | 16 | 17 | N/A |
| 2011/12 | 1st place, gold medalist(s) | 4 | 5 | N/A |
| 2012/13 | 2nd place, silver medalist(s) | 5 | 19 | N/A |
| 2013/14 | 4 | 6 | — | N/A |
| 2014/15 | 18 | 20 | — | N/A |

=== Wins ===
| No. | Season | Date | Location | Hill | Size |
|---|---|---|---|---|---|
| 1 | 2007/08 | 27 January 2008 | (Poland) Zakopane | Wielka Krokiew HS134 | LH |
| 2 | 2011/12 | 17 December 2011 | (Switzerland) Engelberg | Gross-Titlis-Schanze HS137 | LH |
| 3 | 2011/12 | 15 January 2012 | (Austria) Tauplitz/Bad Mitterndorf | Kulm HS200 | FH |
| 4 | 2011/12 | 12 February 2012 | (Germany) Willingen | Mühlenkopfschanze HS145 | LH |
| 5 | 2012/13 | 9 January 2013 | (Poland) Wisła | Malinka HS134 (night) | LH |
| 6 | 2013/14 | 19 January 2014 | (Poland) Zakopane | Wielka Krokiew HS134 | LH |
| 7 | 2013/14 | 7 March 2014 | (Norway) Trondheim | Granåsen HS140 (night) | LH |
