= Robert Kranjec =

Slovenian ski jumper

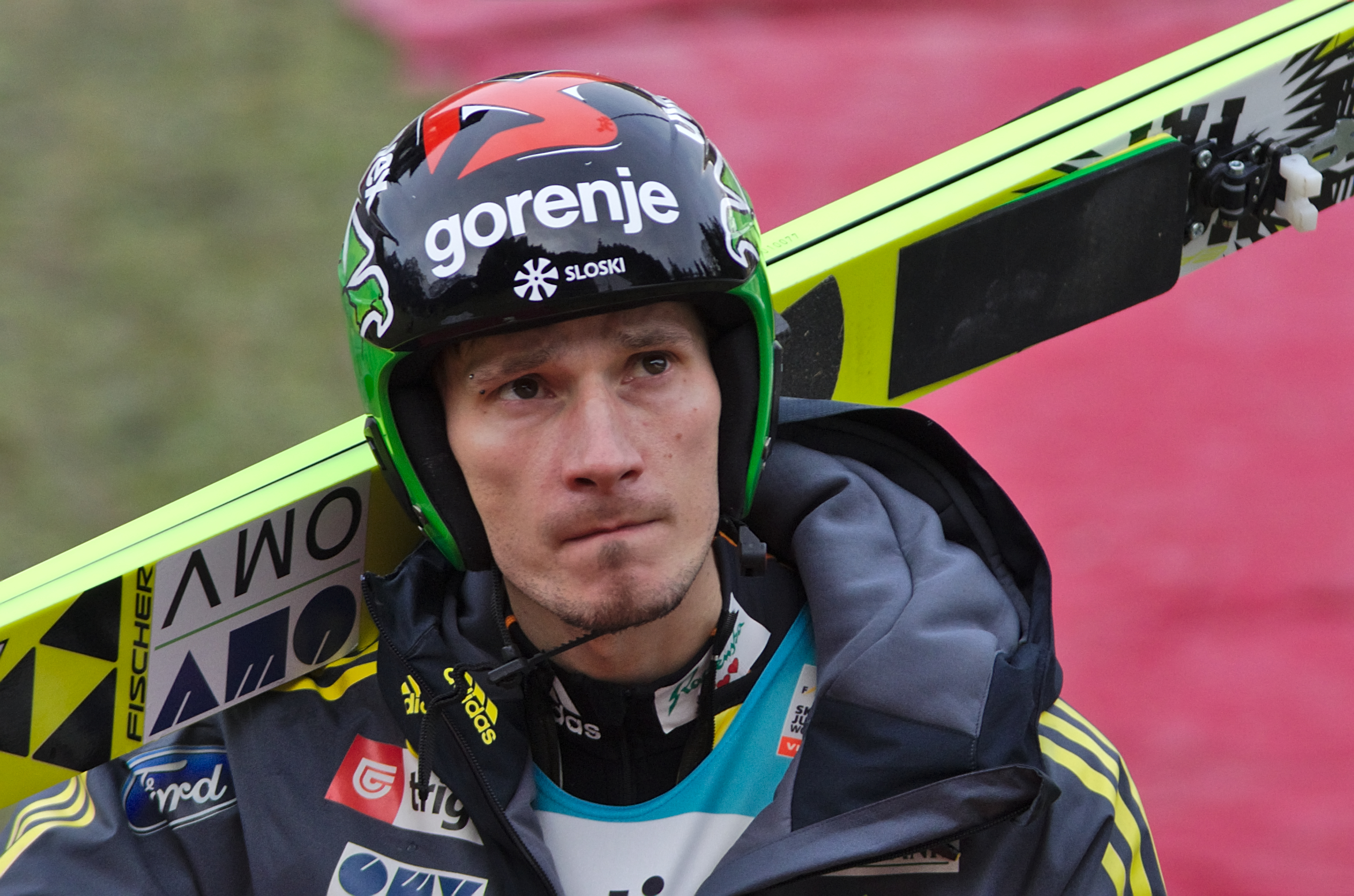

Personal information
- Born: 16 July 1981 (age 45) Ljubljana, SR Slovenia, SFR Yugoslavia
- Height: 1.75 m (5 ft 9 in)

Sport
- Sport: Ski jumping

World Cup career
- Seasons: 1998; 2000–2016; 2018–2019
- Indiv. starts: 325
- Indiv. podiums: 27
- Indiv. wins: 7
- Team starts: 51
- Team podiums: 16
- Team wins: 8
- Ski Flying titles: 2 (2010, 2012)

Achievements and titles
- Personal bests: 244 m (801 ft); Vikersund, 25 February 2012
Medal record
Men's ski jumping
Olympic Games
Bronze medal – third place	2002 Salt Lake City	Team LH
FIS Nordic World Ski Championships
Bronze medal – third place	2011 Oslo	Team LH
Men's ski flying
FIS Ski Flying World Championships
Gold medal – first place	2012 Vikersund	Individual
Bronze medal – third place	2012 Vikersund	Team

Robert Kranjec (born 16 July 1981) is a Slovenian former ski jumper.

== Career ==
Kranjec won a bronze medal at the 2002 Winter Olympics in Salt Lake City in the team large hill event. He won his first World Cup event at Kuusamo, Finland in 2005. In the following years, he could not reach any top results except for ski flying competitions. In 2010 he celebrated his second World Cup victory at Tauplitz, Austria. After two more successful ski flying competitions at Tauplitz and Oberstdorf, in which he achieved second place each time, he won the ski flying World Cup in the 2009–10 season.

In 2012, he won the 2012 FIS Ski Flying World Championships and thus became Slovenia's third World Champion in ski jumping and the first in ski flying. He also set a new national record. At the same championship, he won the bronze medal in team competition. In the same season, Kranjec also won his second ski flying World Cup title.

Kranjec retired from ski jumping in March 2019.

== Personal life ==
Kranjec was born in Ljubljana, Yugoslavia (present-day Slovenia) to a Slovene mother and a Croat father.

In April 2026, Kranjec suffered severe injuries in a bicycle accident. As of May 2026, he was unable to move his legs due to damage to his spine, and was confined to a wheelchair. According to his physicians, it is likely that he will regain the ability to walk normally again.

== World Cup results ==
=== Standings ===
Season	Overall	4H	SF	NT	JP
1997–98	—	—	—	—	—
1999–00	—	—	—	—	—
2000–01	—	—	—	—	N/A
2001–02	16	23	N/A	7	N/A
2002–03	17	25	N/A	15	N/A
2003–04	46	47	N/A	36	N/A
2004–05	45	58	N/A	32	N/A
2005–06	16	28	N/A	—	N/A
2006–07	27	37	N/A	35	N/A
2007–08	25	28	N/A	30	N/A
2008–09	23	31	7	12	N/A
2009–10	10	14	1st place, gold medalist(s)	12	N/A
2010–11	18	21	8	N/A	N/A
2011–12	9	14	1st place, gold medalist(s)	N/A	N/A
2012–13	6	21	2nd place, silver medalist(s)	N/A	N/A
2013–14	11	28	9	N/A	N/A
2014–15	26	29	21	N/A	N/A
2015–16	13	42	2nd place, silver medalist(s)	N/A	N/A
2017–18	49	—	27	N/A	N/A
2018–19	—	—	—	N/A	N/A

=== Individual wins ===
No.	Season	Date	Location	Hill	Size
1	2005–06	26 November 2005	(Finland) Kuusamo	Rukatunturi HS142	LH
2	2009–10	9 January 2010	(Austria) Tauplitz/Bad Mitterndorf	Kulm HS200	FH
3	2011–12	15 January 2012	(Austria) Tauplitz/Bad Mitterndorf	Kulm HS200	FH
4	2011–12	16 March 2012	(Slovenia) Planica	Letalnica bratov Gorišek HS215	FH
5	2012–13	27 January 2013	(Norway) Vikersund	Vikersundbakken HS225	FH
6	2015–16	12 February 2016	(Norway) Vikersund	Vikersundbakken HS225	FH
7	2015–16	18 March 2016	(Slovenia) Planica	Letalnica bratov Gorišek HS225	FH
