= Jurij Tepeš =

Slovenian ski jumper

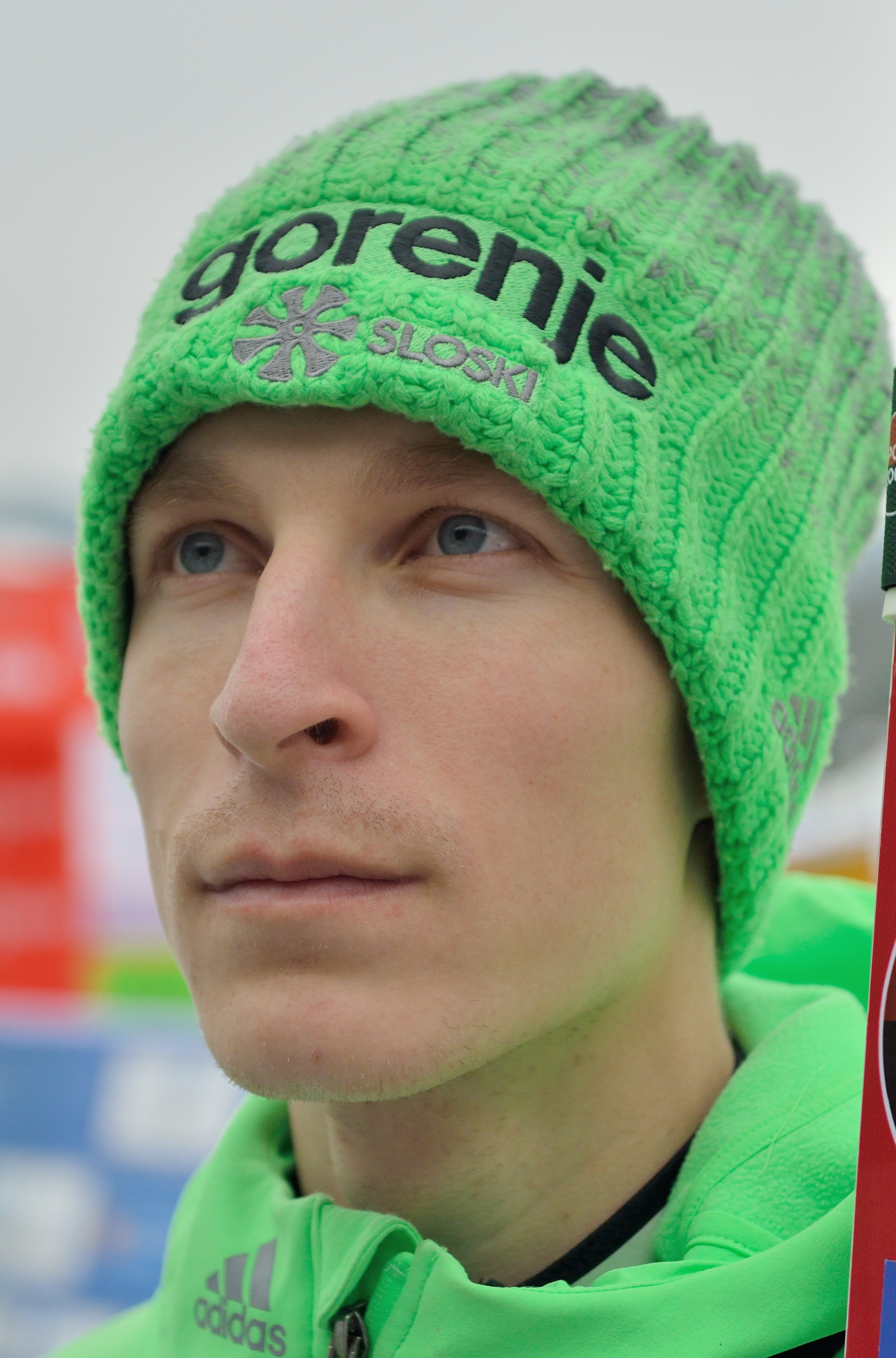

Personal information
- Born: 14 February 1989 (age 37) Ljubljana, SR Slovenia, SFR Yugoslavia
- Height: 1.83 m (6 ft 0 in)

Sport
- Sport: Ski jumping

World Cup career
- Seasons: 2006; 2008–2020
- Indiv. starts: 197
- Indiv. podiums: 7
- Indiv. wins: 2
- Team starts: 35
- Team podiums: 16
- Team wins: 9

Achievements and titles
- Personal bests: 244 m (801 ft); Planica, 22 March 2015
Medal record
Men's Ski Jumping
FIS Nordic World Ski Championships
Bronze medal – third place	2011 Oslo	Team LH
Men's ski flying
FIS Ski Flying World Championships
Bronze medal – third place	2012 Vikersund	Team

Jurij Tepeš (born 14 February 1989) is a Slovenian former ski jumper.

== Career ==
Tepeš won a bronze medal at the FIS Nordic World Ski Championships 2011 in Oslo in the team large hill event. In the 2010–11 season he got his first podium in World Cup team event with Slovenia. For the first time in his career he won individual in a Grand Prix competition in Almaty, Kazakhstan.

At the FIS Ski Flying World Championships 2012 in Vikersund, he won the bronze medal with Slovenia. In this competition, Tepeš jumped the Slovenian national record with 235.5 m (773 ft). He won individual in a Grand Prix competition in Almaty for the second time in his career.

The 2012–13 was the most successful World Cup season in his career. In Vikersund he set his personal best jump with 237 m (778 ft). His first individual podium came in Harrachov in February 2013, where he finished third. He won his first individual World Cup event in Planica in March 2013.

On 22 March 2015 in Planica, Tepeš became one of the few ski jumpers to achieve a "perfect jump", with all five judges giving him top style marks of 20.

== Personal life ==
His father, Miran Tepeš, was also a ski jumper. He was also a technical delegate at the FIS Ski Jumping World Cup events. His sister Anja used to compete in the Ladies' World Cup before her retirement in 2015.

== World Cup results ==
=== Standings ===
Season	Overall	4H	SF	RA	NT
2005–06	—	57	N/A	N/A	55
2007–08	56	69	N/A	N/A	60
2009–10	71	—	30	N/A	N/A
2010–11	34	26	20	N/A	N/A
2011–12	24	36	19	N/A	N/A
2012–13	13	45	4	N/A	N/A
2013–14	18	33	5	N/A	N/A
2014–15	13	—	3rd place, bronze medalist(s)	N/A	N/A
2015–16	21	44	12	N/A	N/A
2016–17	20	23	8	21	N/A
2017–18	50	—	29	—	N/A
2018–19	59	—	35	—	N/A
2019–20	49	—	22	—	N/A

=== Individual wins ===
No.	Season	Date	Location	Hill	Size
1	2012–13	24 March 2013	(Slovenia) Planica	Letalnica bratov Gorišek HS215	FH
2	2014–15	22 March 2015	(Slovenia) Planica	Letalnica bratov Gorišek HS225	FH
