= Lukáš Hlava =

Czech ski jumper (born 1984)

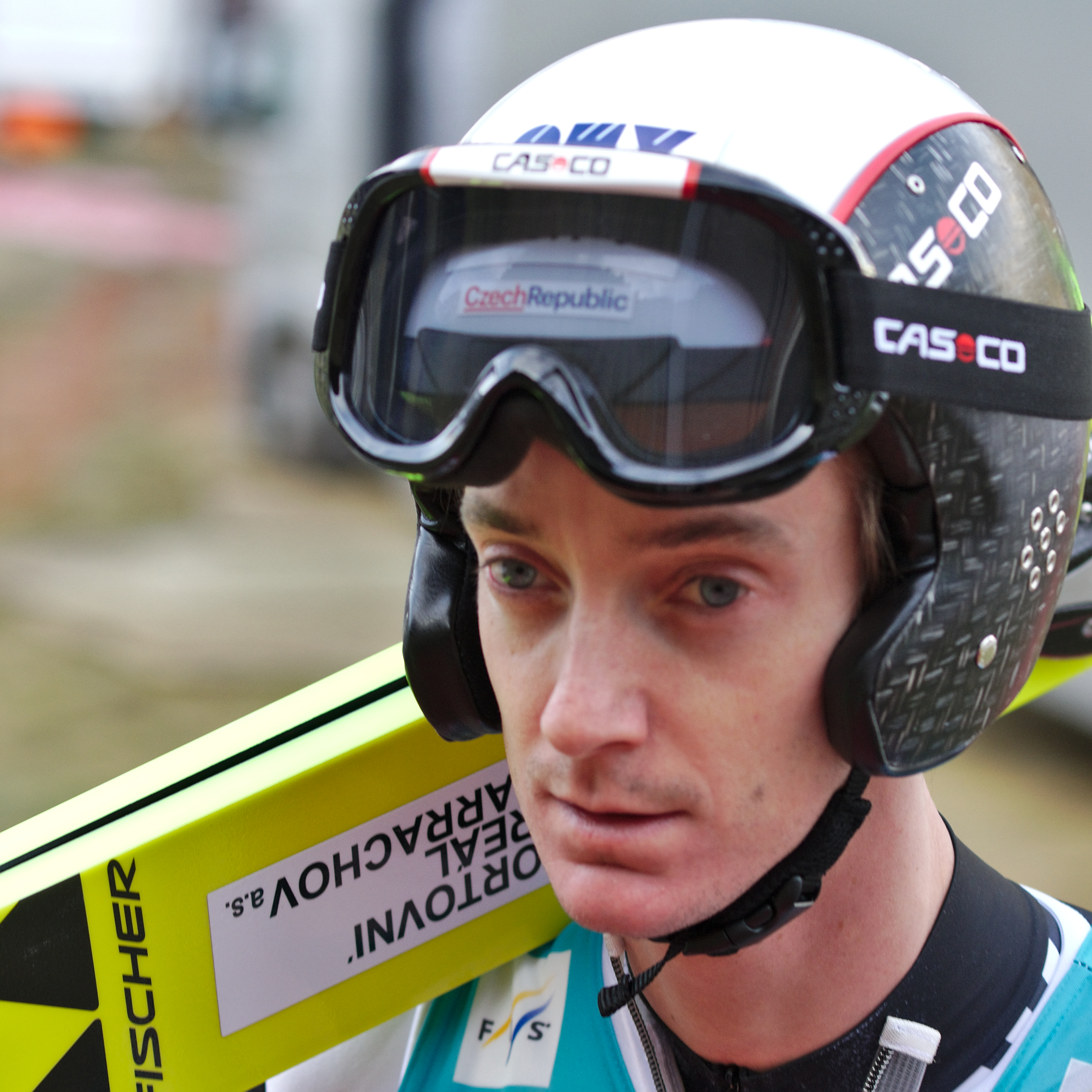

Personal information
- Born: 10 September 1984 (age 42) Harrachov, Czech Republic
- Height: 5 ft 11 in (180 cm)

Sport
- Sport: Skiing
- Club: Dukla Liberec

World Cup career
- Seasons: 2002–2019
- Indiv. podiums: 1
- Indiv. wins: 0

Achievements and titles
- Personal best: 207 m (Oberstdorf 2011)

Lukáš Hlava (Czech pronunciation: [ˈlukaːʃ ˈɦlava], born 10 September 1984 in Harrachov) is a Czech ski jumper who has competed since 2002. At the 2010 Winter Olympics in Vancouver, he finished seventh in the team large hill event and 38th in the individual normal hill events.

Hlava's best finish at the FIS Nordic World Ski Championships was fifth in the team large hill event at Liberec in 2009. His best individual finish was 20th in the individual normal hill event at those same championship.

In Lahti, he finished third and stood on the podium in the World Cup for the first time in his career.

He is the younger brother of former ski jumper Jakub Hlava.

He ended his career after 2018–2019 season.
