= Roman Koudelka =

Czech ski jumper (born 1989)

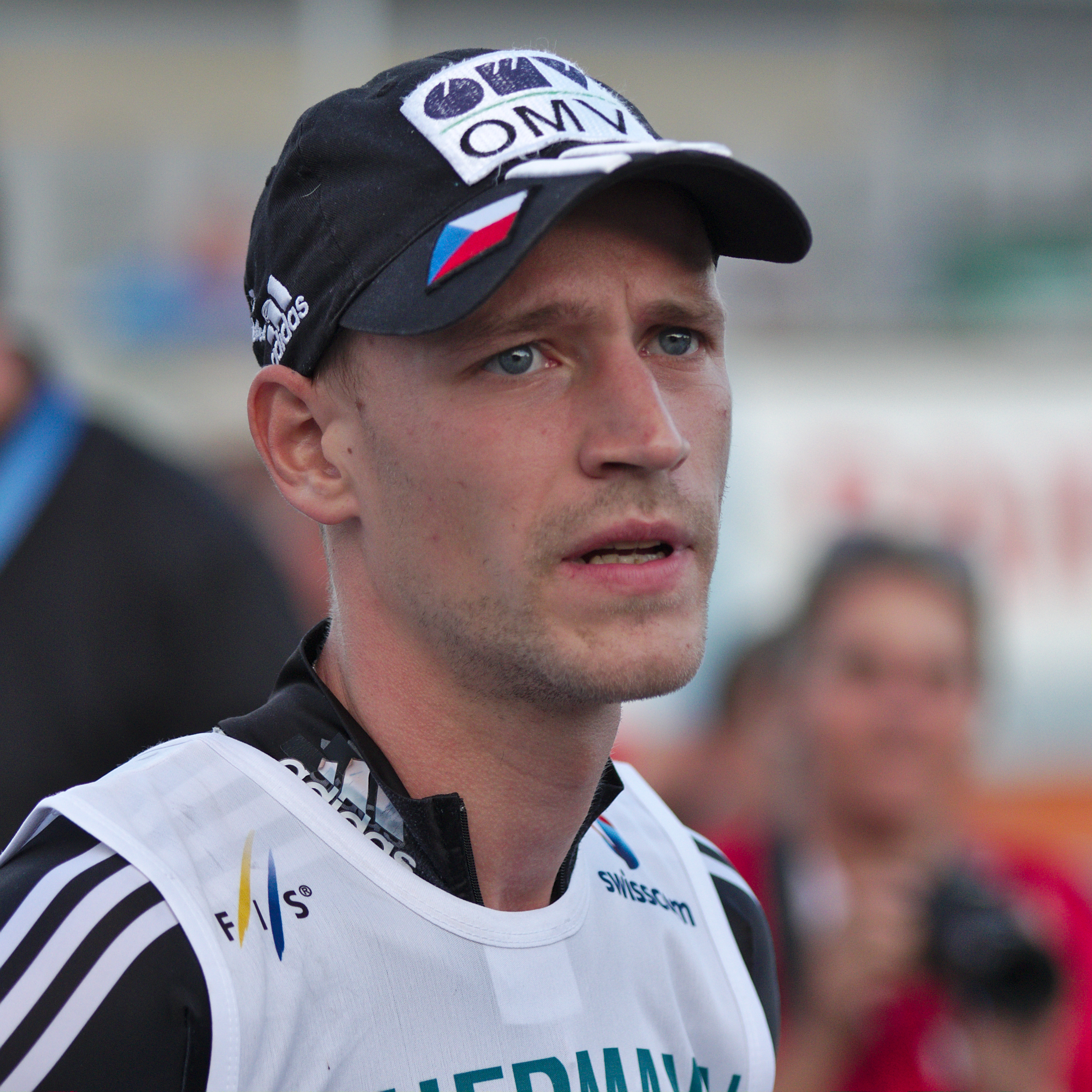
- Koudelka in 2014

Personal information
- Nationality: Czech Republic
- Born: 9 July 1989 (age 37) Turnov, Czechoslovakia
- Height: 1.70 m (5 ft 7 in)

Sport
- Sport: Skiing
- Club: LSK Lomnice nad Popelkou

World Cup career
- Seasons: 2007–present
- Indiv. starts: 287
- Indiv. podiums: 11
- Indiv. wins: 5
- Team starts: 58

Achievements and titles
- Personal bests: 226.5 m (801 ft); Vikersund, 26 February 2012
- Updated on 12 March 2020

Roman Koudelka (Czech pronunciation: [ˈroman ˈkoudɛlka]; born 9 July 1989) is a Czech ski jumper.

== Career ==
Koudelka's first world cup start was in Kuusamo on 24 November 2006. He finished in 31st position. He ended the season 39th in the world cup standings with 87 points. The following season he finished 17th in the world cup standings with 411 points. In the 2008/09 season, he finished 16th with 403 points. He tied for 63rd in the 2009/10 campaign with just 20 points. He finished in 16th place in the world cup standings for a second time in the 2010/11 season after scoring 382 points. Koudelka's best finish at the FIS Nordic World Ski Championships was fifth in the team large hill event at Liberec in 2009.

At the 2010 Winter Olympics, he finished seventh in the team large hill, 12th in the individual normal hill, and 23rd in the individual large hill events.

He has finished fourth in the World Cup on five occasions since 2007, most recently in Lillehammer on the smaller hill. In 2009 he was 2nd in the Summer Grand Prix in Courchevel. In 2011 he was third in a ski flying World Cup competition in Harrachov, when he also set his personal best, 211 m. In December 2011, Koudelka fell heavily when he lost his binding while in the air. Koudelka tried to get up after the accident but passed out and was taken to hospital. However, he returned to action in Engelberg a week later. On 12 February 2012, Koudelka finished as runner-up in Willingen to improve his best position in a FIS World Cup event. Koudelka is recognised as an aggressive jumper, but despite his all-or-nothing approach, Koudelka has established himself as a consistent performer with many top-10 finishes in the 2011/12 season.

Koudelka has jumped 143 m in Jested, Liberec K120, which is the hill record. Koudelka's skis are made by Fischer, his bindings by WinAir and his boots by Rass. Koudelka speaks both Czech and German.

He also competed at the 2014, 2018, 2022 and 2026 Winter Olympics.

== World Cup ==
=== Standings ===
Season	Overall	4H	SF	RA	W5	T5	P7	NT
2006/07	39	42	—	N/A	N/A	N/A	N/A	—
2007/08	17	11	—	N/A	N/A	N/A	N/A	29
2008/09	16	18	25	N/A	N/A	N/A	N/A	19
2009/10	63	—	—	N/A	N/A	N/A	N/A	47
2010/11	16	30	11	N/A	N/A	N/A	N/A	N/A
2011/12	10	5	10	N/A	N/A	N/A	N/A	N/A
2012/13	49	35	44	N/A	N/A	N/A	N/A	N/A
2013/14	39	—	—	N/A	N/A	N/A	N/A	N/A
2014/15	7	9	28	N/A	N/A	N/A	N/A	N/A
2015/16	11	14	19	N/A	N/A	N/A	N/A	N/A
2016/17	25	30	25	13	N/A	N/A	N/A	N/A
2017/18	57	42	—	48	44	N/A	—	N/A
2018/19	14	5	28	25	21	N/A	—	N/A
2019/20	26	17	30	35	24	27	N/A	N/A

=== Wins ===
No.	Season	Date	Location	Hill	Size
1	2014/15	23 November 2014	(Germany) Klingenthal	Vogtland Arena HS140	LH
2	2014/15	7 December 2014	(Norway) Lillehammer	Lysgårdsbakken HS138	LH
3	2014/15	21 December 2014	(Switzerland) Engelberg	Gross-Titlis-Schanze HS137	LH
4	2014/15	25 January 2015	(Japan) Sapporo	Ōkurayama HS134	LH
5	2015/16	4 March 2016	(Poland) Wisła	Malinka HS134 (night)	LH
