= Daiki Ito =

Japanese ski jumper (born 1985)

Daiki Itō 伊東 大貴
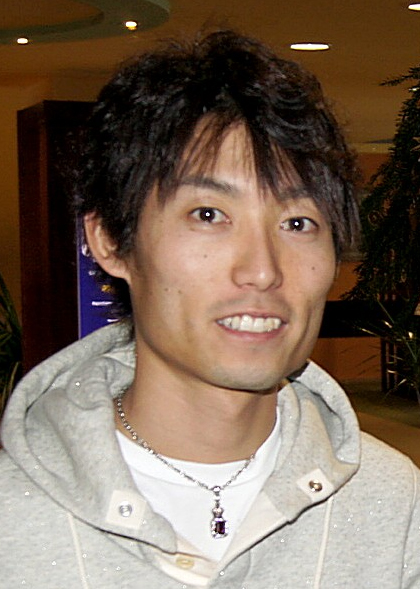
- Ito in 2011

Personal information
- Nationality: Japan
- Born: 27 December 1985 (age 40) Shimokawa, Hokkaidō, Japan
- Height: 1.72 m (5 ft 8 in)

Sport
- Sport: Skiing
- Club: Yukijirushi Nyugyo

World Cup career
- Seasons: 2002; 2004–2022
- Indiv. starts: 341
- Indiv. podiums: 17
- Indiv. wins: 4
- Team starts: 55
- Team podiums: 11
- Team wins: 1

Achievements and titles
- Personal bests: 243 m (797 ft); Vikersund, 19 March 2017
Medal record
Olympic Games
Bronze medal – third place	2014 Sochi	Team LH
FIS Nordic World Ski Championships
Gold medal – first place	2013 Val di Fiemme	Mixed team NH
Bronze medal – third place	2007 Sapporo	Team LH
Bronze medal – third place	2009 Liberec	Team LH
Bronze medal – third place	2017 Lahti	Mixed team NH
Bronze medal – third place	2019 Seefeld	Team LH
- Updated on 6 March 2022

Daiki Itō (伊東 大貴, Itō Daiki; born 27 December 1985) is a Japanese former ski jumper who competed at World Cup level between 2002 and 2022.

== Career ==
He won two bronze medals in the team large hill event at the FIS Nordic World Ski Championships (2007, 2009). He won four world cup individual competitions. Competing in two Winter Olympics, Ito earned his best finish of fifth in the team large hill event at Vancouver in 2010, He finished 20th in the individual event and 5th in the team event of a FIS Ski Flying World Championships 2004. In the World Cup he has finished in the top 10 a total of fourteen times. This includes four podium finishes with his best result being second at Sapporo on 22 January 2006.

== World Cup ==
=== Standings ===
Season	Overall	4H	SF	RA	W6	T5	P7	NT
2001/02	—	—	N/A	N/A	N/A	N/A	N/A	50
2003/04	37	—	N/A	N/A	N/A	N/A	N/A	32
2004/05	13	7	N/A	N/A	N/A	N/A	N/A	20
2005/06	19	23	N/A	N/A	N/A	N/A	N/A	28
2006/07	60	43	N/A	N/A	N/A	N/A	N/A	—
2007/08	31	56	N/A	N/A	N/A	N/A	N/A	32
2008/09	29	19	35	N/A	N/A	N/A	N/A	18
2009/10	16	13	—	N/A	N/A	N/A	N/A	19
2010/11	15	32	13	N/A	N/A	N/A	N/A	N/A
2011/12	4	6	4	N/A	N/A	N/A	N/A	N/A
2012/13	26	50	22	N/A	N/A	N/A	N/A	N/A
2013/14	21	14	—	N/A	N/A	N/A	N/A	N/A
2014/15	16	32	10	N/A	N/A	N/A	N/A	N/A
2015/16	16	13	13	N/A	N/A	N/A	N/A	N/A
2016/17	24	25	18	10	N/A	N/A	N/A	N/A
2017/18	63	—	—	—	—	N/A	–	N/A
2018/19	32	21	31	40	20	N/A	27	N/A
2019/20	24	9	—	30	—	16	N/A	N/A
2020/21	55	—	—	N/A	30	N/A	—	N/A
2021/22	39	32	—	33	—	N/A	43	N/A

=== Wins ===
No.	Season	Date	Location	Hill	Size
1	2011/12	28 January 2012	(Japan) Sapporo	Ōkurayama HS134 (night)	LH
2	2011/12	29 January 2012	(Japan) Sapporo	Ōkurayama HS134	LH
3	2011/12	4 March 2012	(Finland) Lahti	Salpausselkä HS97	NH
4	2011/12	8 March 2012	(Norway) Trondheim	Granåsen HS140 (night)	LH
