= FIS Nordic World Ski Championships 2013 – Individual large hill =

Individual large hill at the FIS Nordic World Ski Championships 2013
- Date: 27 February 2013
- Competitors: 50 from 17 nations
- Winning points: 295.8

Medalists
gold medal	Kamil Stoch	Poland
silver medal	Peter Prevc	Slovenia
bronze medal	Anders Jacobsen	Norway

The men's individual large hill ski jumping event at the 2013 FIS Nordic World Ski Championships was held on 28 February 2013. A qualification was held on 27 February 2013.

== Results ==
=== Qualifying ===
The qualification was started at 17:00.

Rank	Bib	Name	Country	Distance (m)	Points	Notes
1	50	Wolfgang Loitzl	Austria	125.0	135.9	Q
2	52	Michael Neumayer	Germany	124.5	133.2	Q
3	45	Thomas Morgenstern	Austria	123.5	129.0	Q
4	43	Andreas Wank	Germany	122.0	128.5	Q
5	44	Andreas Stjernen	Norway	121.5	127.7	Q
6	48	Maciej Kot	Poland	121.0	126.6	Q
7	46	Taku Takeuchi	Japan	121.5	126.1	Q
8	39	Noriaki Kasai	Japan	120.0	126.0	Q
9	33	Daiki Ito	Japan	119.0	125.9	Q
10	41	Manuel Fettner	Austria	121.0	125.7	Q
11	40	Vladimir Zografski	Bulgaria	121.0	125.4	Q
12	25	Alexey Romashov	Russia	118.0	123.6	Q
13	34	Dawid Kubacki	Poland	118.0	122.2	Q
14	51	Jaka Hvala	Slovenia	118.0	120.8	Q
15	38	Lukáš Hlava	Czech Republic	117.0	120.0	Q
16	42	Piotr Żyła	Poland	118.0	119.9	Q
17	53	Tom Hilde	Norway	118.0	119.7	Q
18	37	Stefan Kraft	Austria	116.5	118.9	Q
19	35	Sebastian Colloredo	Italy	115.5	117.8	Q
20	30	Roman Koudelka	Czech Republic	115.0	117.4	Q
21	49	Jurij Tepeš	Slovenia	118.5	117.0	Q
22	23	Andrea Morassi	Italy	116.0	114.3	Q
23	27	Yuta Watase	Japan	113.0	113.9	Q
24	24	Jakub Janda	Czech Republic	114.0	112.2	Q
25	36	Denis Kornilov	Russia	113.0	111.8	Q
26	21	Kaarel Nurmsalu	Estonia	114.5	110.1	Q
27	28	Vincent Descombes Sevoie	France	111.0	108.5	Q
28	29	Ilya Rosliakov	Russia	111.0	106.6	Q
29	6	Marco Grigoli	Switzerland	109.5	106.2	Q
30	8	Martti Nõmme	Estonia	110.0	105.6	Q
31	47	Dmitry Vassiliev	Russia	112.0	103.9	Q
32	22	Ville Larinto	Finland	111.0	103.3	Q
33	10	Radik Zhaparov	Kazakhstan	107.0	101.1	Q
34	12	Roberto Dellasega	Italy	106.5	100.0	Q
35	13	Carl Nordin	Sweden	107.0	99.9	Q
36	32	Lauri Asikainen	Finland	106.0	98.9	Q
37	14	Anssi Koivuranta	Finland	105.5	97.6	Q
38	31	Gregor Deschwanden	Switzerland	105.5	96.8	Q
38	9	Anders Johnson	United States	105.0	96.8	Q
40	26	Peter Frenette	United States	105.0	96.6	Q
41	3	Killian Peier	Switzerland	103.5	93.9	
42	5	Ronan Lamy-Chappuis	France	103.0	93.1	
43	11	Alexander Mitz	Sweden	100.0	85.0	
44	17	Sami Heiskanen	Finland	100.0	84.7	
45	20	Davide Bresadola	Italy	102.0	84.6	
46	19	Sabirzhan Muminov	Kazakhstan	99.0	80.1	
47	15	Konstantin Sokolenko	Kazakhstan	94.0	74.8	
47	1	Alexey Korolev	Kazakhstan	94.5	74.8	
49	18	Andrii Klymchuk	Ukraine	95.0	74.3	
50	7	Tomáš Zmoray	Slovakia	94.5	73.5	
51	4	Volodymyr Veredyuk	Ukraine	93.0	72.4	
52	16	Patrik Lichý	Slovakia	93.0	70.6	
*	54	Simon Ammann	Switzerland	N/A		Q ,
*	55	Peter Prevc	Slovenia	126.0		Q ,
*	56	Jan Matura	Czech Republic	123.5		Q ,
*	57	Richard Freitag	Germany	123.0		Q ,
*	58	Robert Kranjec	Slovenia	N/A		Q ,
*	59	Kamil Stoch	Poland	125.0		Q ,
*	60	Severin Freund	Germany	123.0		Q ,
*	61	Anders Jacobsen	Norway	121.0		Q ,
*	62	Anders Bardal	Norway	123.0		Q ,
*	63	Gregor Schlierenzauer	Austria	124.5		Q ,
	2	Nico Polychronidis	Greece			DSQ

1: These skiers are pre-qualified; they do perform jumps in the qualification round, but will be not ranked with the non-pre-qualified jumpers.

=== Final ===
The final was started at 17:00.

Rank	Bib	Name	Country	Round 1 Distance (m)	Round 1 Points	Round 1 Rank	Final Round Distance (m)	Final Round Points	Final Round Rank	Total Points
1st place, gold medalist(s)	46	Kamil Stoch	Poland	131.5	144.9	1	130.0	150.9	1	295.8
2nd place, silver medalist(s)	42	Peter Prevc	Slovenia	130.5	139.8	2	130.5	149.9	3	289.7
3rd place, bronze medalist(s)	48	Anders Jacobsen	Norway	129.0	138.4	3	131.0	150.7	2	289.1
4	37	Wolfgang Loitzl	Austria	128.5	138.1	4	132.5	146.8	6	284.9
5	43	Jan Matura	Czech Republic	127.5	133.3	12	132.0	148.1	4	281.4
6	44	Richard Freitag	Germany	129.0	137.7	5	128.5	142.7	10	280.4
7	41	Simon Ammann	Switzerland	127.5	134.2	10	132.5	145.6	7	279.8
8	50	Gregor Schlierenzauer	Austria	125.0	131.7	16	128.5	147.5	5	279.2
9	47	Severin Freund	Germany	126.5	133.1	13	129.5	144.3	8	277.4
10	20	Daiki Ito	Japan	127.5	135.4	7	127.0	141.5	11	276.9
11	49	Anders Bardal	Norway	127.5	134.9	8	129.0	141.5	11	276.4
12	30	Andreas Wank	Germany	127.5	136.0	6	129.5	140.4	13	276.4
13	39	Michael Neumayer	Germany	130.5	134.6	9	124.0	139.7	15	274.3
14	40	Tom Hilde	Norway	127.5	133.4	11	129.0	140.2	14	273.6
15	28	Manuel Fettner	Austria	126.5	133.0	14	125.5	139.7	15	272.7
16	32	Thomas Morgenstern	Austria	126.0	128.9	22	125.5	142.9	9	271.8
17	33	Taku Takeuchi	Japan	126.0	132.7	15	126.0	137.8	20	270.5
18	31	Andreas Stjernen	Norway	125.0	131.3	17	127.0	137.6	21	268.9
19	29	Piotr Żyła	Poland	124.0	129.0	21	126.5	139.1	17	268.1
20	21	Dawid Kubacki	Poland	126.5	130.4	19	126.0	134.9	25	265.3
21	45	Robert Kranjec	Slovenia	123.0	126.1	25	126.5	138.4	18	264.5
22	26	Noriaki Kasai	Japan	125.0	128.0	23	125.0	135.7	24	263.7
23	24	Stefan Kraft	Austria	124.5	126.5	24	124.5	135.8	23	262.3
24	25	Lukáš Hlava	Czech Republic	121.5	122.2	29	126.5	138.1	19	260.3
25	38	Jaka Hvala	Slovenia	122.0	123.3	27	125.0	136.5	22	259.8
26	8	Kaarel Nurmsalu	Estonia	121.0	130.0	20	122.5	129.4	28	259.4
27	35	Maciej Kot	Poland	125.0	130.5	18	122.5	128.2	29	258.7
28	36	Jurij Tepeš	Slovenia	122.0	123.2	28	124.5	134.9	25	258.1
29	15	Vincent Descombes Sevoie	France	122.0	121.9	30	126.5	134.8	27	256.7
30	17	Roman Koudelka	Czech Republic	120.5	123.5	26	121.5	127.0	30	250.5
31	27	Vladimir Zografski	Bulgaria	120.5	121.4	31				121.4
32	23	Denis Kornilov	Russia	121.0	120.8	32				120.8
32	22	Sebastian Colloredo	Italy	122.0	120.8	33				120.8
34	14	Yuta Watase	Japan	119.0	119.6	34				119.6
35	5	Roberto Dellasega	Italy	115.5	119.3	35				119.3
36	34	Dmitry Vassiliev	Russia	118.5	115.9	36				115.9
37	16	Ilya Rosliakov	Russia	118.0	114.7	37				114.7
38	10	Andrea Morassi	Italy	112.0	112.7	38				112.7
39	3	Anders Johnson	United States	111.0	107.4	39				107.4
40	4	Radik Zhaparov	Kazakhstan	111.0	106.0	40				106.0
41	12	Alexey Romashov	Russia	109.0	105.9	41				105.9
42	1	Marco Grigoli	Switzerland	110.0	103.9	42				103.9
43	18	Gregor Deschwanden	Switzerland	112.5	103.8	43				103.8
44	6	Carl Nordin	Sweden	110.0	102.7	44				102.7
45	7	Anssi Koivuranta	Finland	105.5	98.2	45				98.2
46	9	Ville Larinto	Finland	103.5	94.5	46				94.5
47	11	Jakub Janda	Czech Republic	104.5	95.0	47				95.0
48	19	Lauri Asikainen	Finland	106.0	91.1	48				91.1
49	2	Martti Nõmme	Estonia	104.0	90.9	49				90.9
50	13	Peter Frenette	United States	98.0	83.1	50				83.1
