= FIS Nordic World Ski Championships 2013 – Men's individual normal hill =

Men's individual normal hill at the FIS Nordic World Ski Championships 2013
- Date: 23 February 2013
- Competitors: 50 from 17 nations
- Winning points: 252.6

Medalists
gold medal	Anders Bardal	Norway
silver medal	Gregor Schlierenzauer	Austria
bronze medal	Peter Prevc	Slovenia

The men's Individual normal hill ski jumping event at the FIS Nordic World Ski Championships 2013 was held on 23 February 2013 with the qualification being held on 22 February 2013.

== Results ==
=== Qualifying ===
The Qualifying was held at 18:07.

Rank	Bib	Name	Country	Distance (m)	Distance Points	Judges Points	Total	Notes
1	55	Tom Hilde	Norway	103.0	76.0	54.5	121.3	Q
2	49	Taku Takeuchi	Japan	102.5	75.0	54.5	120.7	Q
3	47	Andreas Stjernen	Norway	102.5	75.0	56.0	119.8	Q
4	46	Andreas Wank	Germany	100.5	71.0	57.0	117.7	Q
5	37	Dawid Kubacki	Poland	99.5	69.0	54.5	117.4	Q
6	51	Maciej Kot	Poland	101.5	73.0	55.5	117.1	Q
7	44	Manuel Fettner	Austria	100.0	70.0	55.0	116.4	Q
8	52	Wolfgang Loitzl	Austria	99.0	68.0	55.5	115.0	Q
9	36	Daiki Ito	Japan	100.5	71.0	52.5	114.4	Q
10	45	Piotr Żyła	Poland	100.5	71.0	53.5	114.3	Q
11	38	Sebastian Colloredo	Italy	98.5	67.0	54.0	113.2	Q
12	50	Dimitry Vassiliev	Russia	100.0	70.0	54.5	113.1	Q
13	29	Yuta Watase	Japan	100.0	70.0	53.5	113.1	Q
14	43	Vladimir Zografski	Bulgaria	97.5	65.0	54.0	112.1	Q
15	26	Jakub Janda	Czech Republic	98.0	66.0	55.0	111.5	Q
16	23	Kaarel Nurmsalu	Estonia	95.5	61.0	55.0	111.3	Q
17	54	Michael Neumayer	Germany	98.5	67.0	54.0	110.8	Q
18	42	Noriaki Kasai	Japan	97.5	65.0	54.0	110.7	Q
19	48	Thomas Morgenstern	Austria	98.5	67.0	54.0	110.6	Q
20	41	Lukáš Hlava	Czech Republic	96.0	62.0	53.5	107.7	Q
20	25	Andrea Morassi	Italy	96.0	62.0	54.0	107.7	Q
22	53	Jaka Hvala	Slovenia	96.0	62.0	54.0	107.5	Q
23	27	Alexey Romashov	Russia	96.5	63.0	49.5	107.1	Q
24	40	Stefan Kraft	Austria	94.5	59.0	54.5	106.8	Q
25	30	Vincent Descombes Sevoie	France	95.5	61.0	52.5	106.2	Q
26	19	Martti Nõmme	Estonia	93.5	57.0	52.0	103.8	Q
27	33	Matjaž Pungertar	Slovenia	93.5	57.0	52.5	102.7	Q
28	32	Roman Koudelka	Czech Republic	92.5	55.0	52.5	101.7	Q
29	34	Gregor Deschwanden	Switzerland	95.5	61.0	52.0	101.3	Q
30	11	Anssi Koivuranta	Finland	93.0	56.0	54.0	101.0	Q
31	7	Anders Johnson	United States	92.5	55.0	53.0	100.1	Q
32	24	Ville Larinto	Finland	91.5	53.0	53.0	98.8	Q
33	31	Ilya Rosliakov	Russia	92.5	55.0	50.5	97.6	Q
34	22	Davide Bresadola	Italy	89.5	49.0	52.0	95.4	Q
35	16	Sami Heiskanen	Finland	88.5	47.0	51.0	93.5	Q
36	15	Ronan Lamy-Chappuis	France	88.5	47.0	51.0	93.2	Q
37	35	Lauri Asikainen	Finland	89.0	48.0	51.5	91.2	Q
37	3	Alexey Korolev	Kazakhstan	88.5	47.0	52.5	91.2	Q
39	21	Nico Polychronidis	Greece	87.0	44.0	51.0	90.4	Q
40	4	Radik Zhaparov	Kazakhstan	87.5	45.0	51.5	90.3	Q
41	28	Peter Frenette	United States	87.5	45.0	50.0	89.0	
42	17	Roberto Dellasega	Italy	86.5	43.0	50.5	86.8	
43	9	Alexander Mitz	Sweden	86.5	43.0	51.0	85.7	
44	20	Tomáš Zmoray	Slovakia	84.0	38.0	50.5	85.1	
45	1	Carl Nordin	Sweden	88.5	47.0	45.0	81.8	
46	8	Volodymyr Veredyuk	Ukraine	83.0	36.0	49.0	79.3	
47	13	Remus Tudor	Romania	83.5	37.0	49.0	77.9	
48	5	Andrii Klymchuk	Ukraine	84.0	38.0	48.0	77.0	
49	10	Konstantin Sokolenko	Kazakhstan	81.5	33.0	49.0	75.5	
50	12	Choi Se-Ou	South Korea	80.0	30.0	50.0	74.9	
51	14	Patrik Lichý	Slovakia	79.5	29.0	46.0	70.1	
52	6	Sabirzhan Muminov	Kazakhstan	74.0	18.0	44.5	53.5	
53	18	Ákos Szilágyi	Hungary	69.5	9.0	46.0	48.2	
54	2	Kristaps Nezhborts	Latvia	57.0	−16.0	45.0	19.8	
*	56	Simon Ammann	Switzerland	102.5	75.0	N/A	N/A	Q ,
*	57	Peter Prevc	Slovenia	96.0	62.0	N/A	N/A	Q ,
*	58	Jan Matura	Czech Republic	100.5	71.0	N/A	N/A	Q ,
*	59	Richard Freitag	Germany	95.5	61.0	N/A	N/A	Q ,
*	60	Robert Kranjec	Slovenia	96.0	62.0	N/A	N/A	Q ,
*	61	Kamil Stoch	Poland	99.5	69.0	N/A	N/A	Q ,
*	62	Severin Freund	Germany	99.0	68.0	N/A	N/A	Q ,
*	63	Anders Jacobsen	Norway	96.5	63.0	N/A	N/A	Q ,
*	64	Anders Bardal	Norway	N/A	N/A	N/A	N/A	Q ,
*	65	Gregor Schlierenzauer	Austria	98.5	67.0	N/A	N/A	Q ,
	39	Denis Kornilov	Russia				DSQ	

1: These skiers are pre-qualified; they do perform jumps in the qualification round, but will be not ranked with the non-pre-qualified jumpers.

=== Final ===
The final was started at 17:00.

Rank	Bib	Name	Country	Round 1 Distance (m)	Round 1 Points	Round 1 Rank	Final Round Distance (m)	Final Round Points	Final Round Rank	Total Points
1st place, gold medalist(s)	49	Anders Bardal	Norway	103.5	124.1	1	100.0	128.5	1	252.6
2nd place, silver medalist(s)	50	Gregor Schlierenzauer	Austria	98.0	120.0	3	97.5	128.4	2	248.4
3rd place, bronze medalist(s)	42	Peter Prevc	Slovenia	102.5	118.3	5	98.5	126.0	5	244.3
4	47	Severin Freund	Germany	101.0	117.3	6	99.0	125.3	6	242.6
5	33	Thomas Morgenstern	Austria	100.0	114.4	10	100.5	127.6	3	242.0
6	44	Richard Freitag	Germany	103.5	119.3	4	97.5	119.8	14	239.1
7	34	Taku Takeuchi	Japan	102.0	115.9	7	98.0	122.1	8	238.0
8	46	Kamil Stoch	Poland	102.0	121.3	2	97.0	116.1	21	237.4
9	31	Andreas Wank	Germany	99.5	109.9	18	99.5	127.4	4	237.3
10	40	Tom Hilde	Norway	99.5	115.1	9	97.0	120.5	12	235.6
11	36	Maciej Kot	Poland	101.5	113.1	11	97.0	121.6	9	234.7
12	43	Jan Matura	Czech Republic	102.5	115.7	8	96.0	118.0	17	233.7
13	32	Andreas Stjernen	Norway	98.0	112.3	12	97.0	121.3	10	233.6
14	16	Vincent Descombes Sevoie	France	96.5	108.0	20	98.0	123.0	7	231.0
15	22	Daiki Ito	Japan	96.0	110.2	16	96.5	120.4	13	230.6
16	41	Simon Ammann	Switzerland	99.0	111.4	13	95.5	118.1	16	229.5
17	37	Wolfgang Loitzl	Austria	93.5	107.2	23	97.5	121.1	11	228.3
18	39	Michael Neumayer	Germany	98.5	110.0	17	96.5	117.9	18	227.9
19	48	Anders Jacobsen	Norway	96.5	109.0	19	97.0	117.9	18	226.9
20	29	Manuel Fettner	Austria	96.0	106.3	27	97.0	118.8	15	225.1
21	15	Yuta Watase	Japan	95.0	107.3	22	95.5	116.7	20	224.0
22	38	Jaka Hvala	Slovenia	97.0	107.2	23	95.0	115.1	22	222.3
23	30	Piotr Żyła	Poland	95.5	106.5	26	95.0	113.6	25	220.1
24	19	Matjaž Pungertar	Slovenia	93.5	105.4	28	94.5	114.3	23	219.7
25	26	Lukáš Hlava	Czech Republic	92.5	105.3	29	93.0	114.1	24	219.4
26	45	Robert Kranjec	Slovenia	100.0	110.9	14	92.0	108.3	28	219.2
26	10	Kaarel Nurmsalu	Estonia	95.0	106.9	25	94.0	112.3	26	219.2
28	35	Dmitry Vassiliev	Russia	99.5	107.9	21	93.5	107.2	29	215.1
29	18	Roman Koudelka	Czech Republic	94.0	104.4	30	91.5	108.9	27	213.3
30	12	Andrea Morassi	Italy	96.5	110.4	15	88.0	101.0	30	211.4
31	23	Dawid Kubacki	Poland	93.5	103.4	31				103.4
31	13	Jakub Janda	Czech Republic	92.5	103.4	31				103.4
33	25	Stefan Kraft	Austria	92.5	101.6	33				101.6
34	14	Alexey Romashov	Russia	92.5	101.4	34				101.4
35	27	Noriaki Kasai	Japan	92.5	100.6	35				100.6
36	24	Sebastian Colloredo	Italy	91.0	98.5	36				98.5
37	3	Anders Johnson	United States	93.5	98.3	37				98.3
38	5	Ronan Lamy-Chappuis	France	91.0	98.1	38				98.1
39	4	Anssi Koivuranta	Finland	90.0	96.3	39				96.3
40	28	Vladimir Zografski	Bulgaria	90.0	94.6	40				94.6
41	20	Gregor Deschwanden	Switzerland	88.0	94.1	41				94.1
42	11	Ville Larinto	Finland	89.5	93.9	42				93.9
43	2	Radik Zhaparov	Kazakhstan	89.5	91.2	43				91.2
44	9	Davide Bresadola	Italy	88.0	90.2	44				90.2
45	8	Nico Polychronidis	Greece	88.0	89.9	45				89.9
46	17	Ilya Rosliakov	Russia	86.0	88.2	46				88.2
47	7	Martti Nõmme	Estonia	86.5	87.7	47				87.7
48	21	Lauri Asikainen	Finland	86.0	86.5	48				86.5
49	1	Alexey Korolev	Kazakhstan	85.5	84.4	49				84.4
50	6	Sami Heiskanen	Finland	83.5	81.5	50				81.5
