= Ski jumping at the FIS Nordic World Ski Championships 2013 =

Ski jumping competition took place on 21 February to March 2 in predazzo at trampolino

The FIS Nordic World Ski Championships 2013 took place in Val di Fiemme. Ski jumping competitions took place on 21 February - 2 March in Predazzo at Trampolino Dal Ben.

It was the second time, together with the Championships 2011, that 5 ski jumping competitions were held. There were three individual competitions (one for men and one for women at the normal hill, HS 106, and one for men at the large hill, HS 134) and two team competitions (one for men at the large hill and one mixed at the normal hill). It was the first time for the mixed competition to be held at the World Championships. Each team consisted of two men and two women.

The winners from Oslo were defending the champion's titles: Thomas Morgenstern (individual men competition, normal hill), Gregor Schlierenzauer (individual men competition, large hill), Daniela Iraschko (individual women competition, normal hill) and the Austria team (team men competition, large hill).

At the individual women competition at the normal hill, the gold medal won Sarah Hendrickson, silver - Sara Takanashi, and bronze - Jacqueline Seifriedsberger.

In the first men competition, the winner was Anders Bardal. The second was Gregor Schlierenzauer, and the third - Peter Prevc.

In the mixed competition won the team of Japan (Yūki Itō, Daiki Itō, Sara Takanashi and Taku Takeuchi). The silver medal went to Austria (Chiara Hölzl, Thomas Morgenstern, Jacqueline Seifriedsberger, Gregor Schlierenzauer), and the bronze one – to Germany (Ulrike Gräßler, Richard Freitag, Carina Vogt, Severin Freund).

In individual men competition at large hill won Kamil Stoch, in front of Prevc and Anders Jacobsen.

Austria managed to defend the champion's title in the team men competition. The team consisted of Wolfgang Loitzl, Manuel Fettner, Thomas Morgenstern and Gregor Schlierenzauer. The silver medal won the Germany team (Andreas Wank, Severin Freund, Michael Neumayer, Richard Freitag), and the bronze one – the Poland team (Maciej Kot, Piotr Żyła, Dawid Kubacki, Kamil Stoch).

It were the 36. World Championships in ski jumping for men and the 3. for women.

== Before the Championships ==
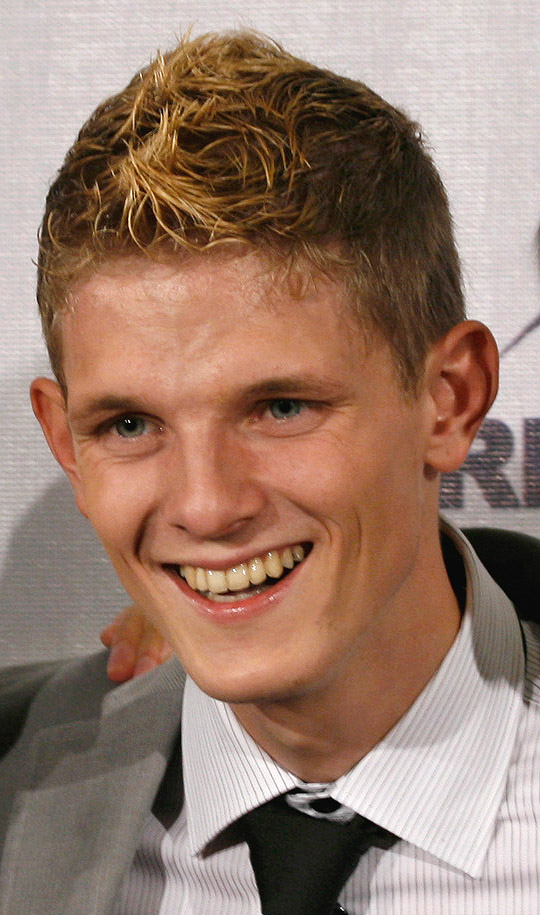
Thomas Morgenstern – the gold (three times) and silver medalist from the Championships 2011

=== World Cup ===
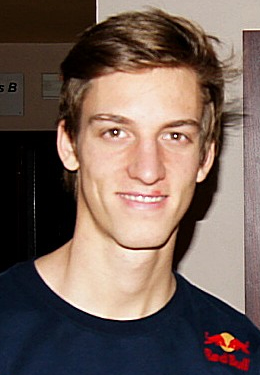
Gregor Schlierenzauer

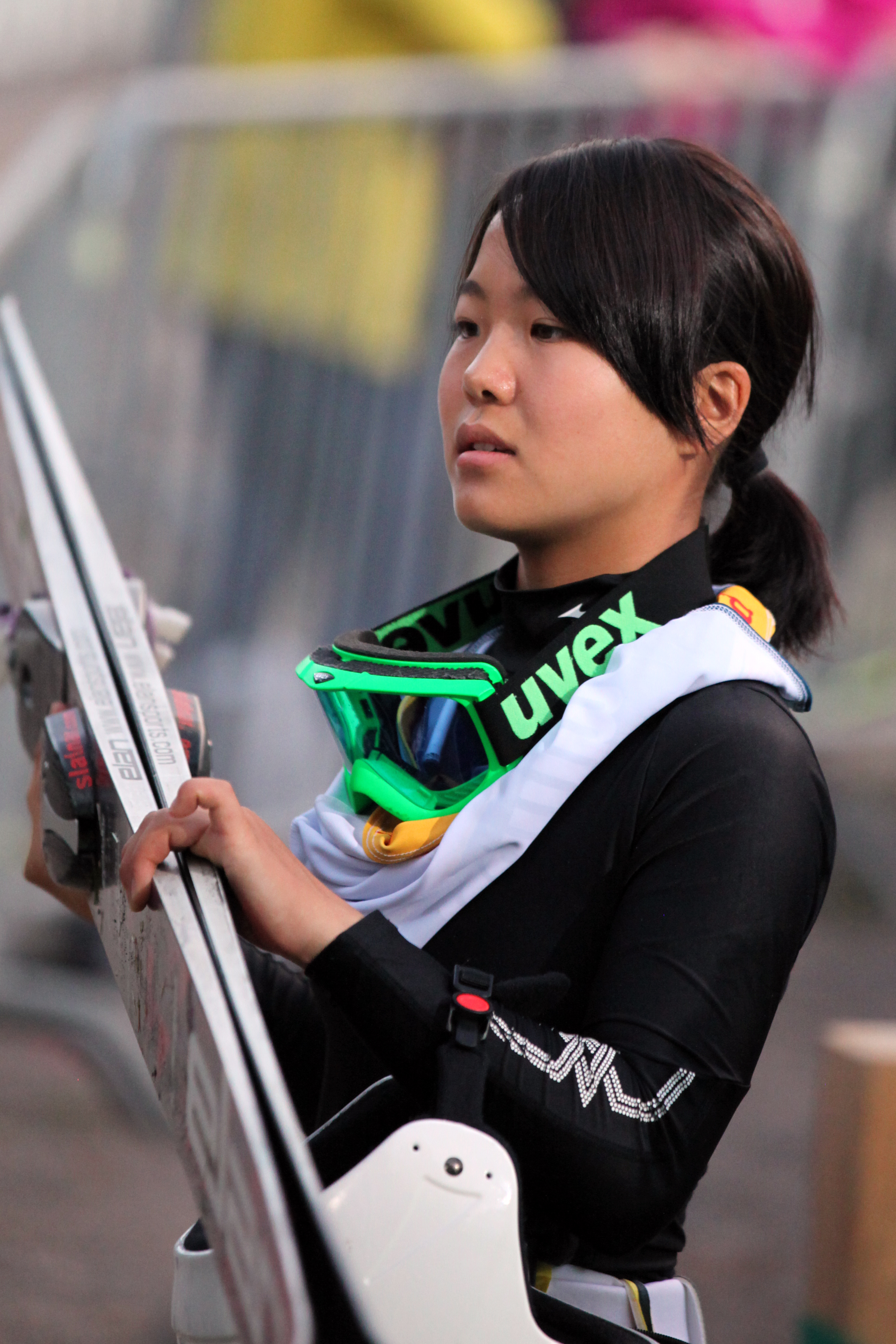
Sara Takanashi

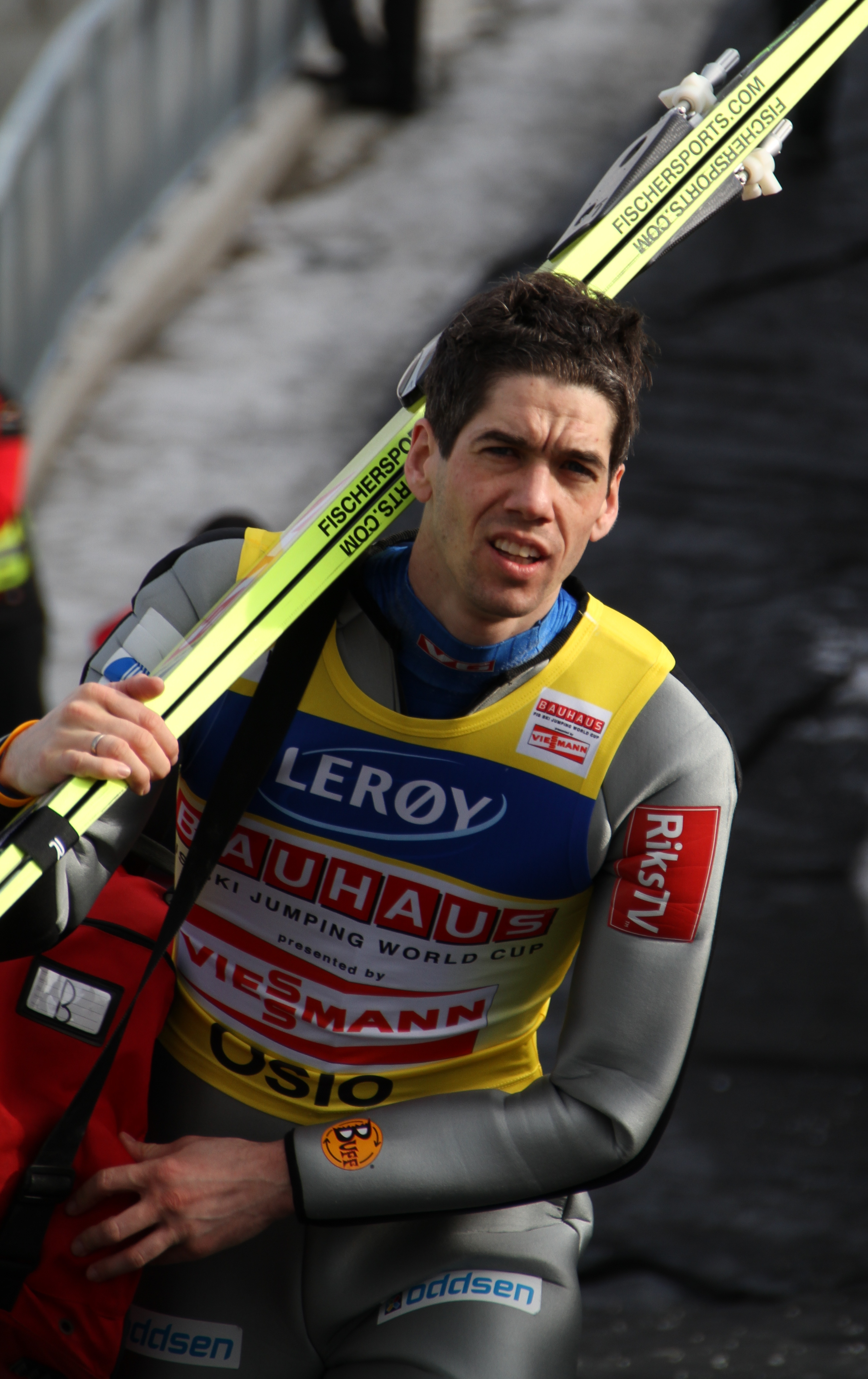
Anders Bardal

Before the Championships, 21 individual and 5 team (including one mixed) World Cup competitions took place. The most wins had Gregor Schlierenzauer (8 times). In three competitions won Anders Jacobsen; two wins for Severin Freund, Andreas Kofler and Jan Matura. Only once won Anders Bardal, Robert Kranjec, Jaka Hvala and Richard Freitag. The leader in general classification was Schlierenzauer, who had 538 points more than Bardal and 588 points more than Jacobsen.

Almost three weeks before the Championships, Gregor Schlierenzauer beat the Matti Nykänen's record of wins in the World Cup competitions. In Harrachov, he won for 48 time in his career.

World Cup standings (men) before the Championships
Rank	Jumper	Country	total	Loss to the leader
1.	Gregor Schlierenzauer	Austria	1320	-
2.	Anders Bardal	Norway	782	538
3.	Anders Jacobsen	Norway	732	588
4.	Severin Freund	Germany	699	621
5.	Kamil Stoch	Poland	602	718
6.	Robert Kranjec	Slovenia	595	725
7.	Richard Freitag	Germany	542	778
8.	Jan Matura	Czech Republic	522	798
9.	Peter Prevc	Slovenia	515	805
10.	Simon Ammann	Switzerland	511	809
11.	Tom Hilde	Norway	510	810
12.	Michael Neumayer	Germany	508	812
13.	Jaka Hvala	Słovenia	480	840
14.	Andreas Kofler	Austria	470	850
15.	Wolfgang Loitzl	Austria	465	855
16.	Andreas Wellinger	Germany	370	950
17.	Jurij Tepeš	Slovenia	352	968
18.	Maciej Kot	Poland	344	976
19.	Taku Takeuchi	Japan	334	986
19.	Dmitrij Wasiljew	Russia	334	986
21.	Thomas Morgenstern	Austria	312	1008
22.	Andreas Stjernen	Norway	308	1012
23.	Anders Fannemel	Norway	289	1031
24.	Rune Velta	Norway	235	1085
25.	Andreas Wank	Germany	232	1088
26.	Piotr Żyła	Poland	213	1107
27.	Martin Koch	Austria	179	1141
28.	Manuel Fettner	Austria	172	1148
29.	Władimir Zografski	Bulgaria	160	1160
30.	Michael Hayböck	Austria	156	1164
31.	Noriaki Kasai	Japan	143	1177
32.	Lukáš Hlava	Czech Republic	140	1180
33.	Stefan Kraft	Austria	131	1189
34.	Dienis Korniłow	Russia	120	1200
35.	Sebastian Colloredo	Italy	106	1214
36.	Dawid Kubacki	Poland	100	1220
37.	Martin Schmitt	Germany	98	1222
38.	Krzysztof Miętus	Poland	91	1229
39.	Daiki Itō	Japan	86	1234
40.	Reruhi Shimizu	Japan	78	1242
41.	Karl Geiger	Germany	71	1249
42.	Maximilian Mechler	Germany	66	1254
43.	Lauri Asikainen	Finland	50	1270
44.	Čestmír Kožíšek	Czech Republic	46	1274
44.	Gregor Deschwanden	Switzerland	46	1274
46.	Matjaž Pungertar	Slovenia	38	1282
46.	Roman Koudelka	Czech Republic	38	1282
48.	Danny Queck	Germany	37	1283
49.	Antonín Hájek	Czech Republic	36	1284
50.	Ilja Roslakow	Russia	31	1289
51.	Vincent Descombes Sevoie	France	30	1290
52.	MacKenzie Boyd-Clowes	Canada	27	1293
53.	Yūta Watase	Japan	26	1294
53.	Stefan Hula	Poland	26	1294
55.	Peter Frenette	USA	21	1299
55.	Olli Muotka	Finland	21	1299
57.	Kim René Elverum Sorsell	Norway	17	1303
58.	Aleksiej Romaszow	Russia	14	1306
59.	Jakub Janda	Czech Republic	13	1307
59.	Junshirō Kobayashi	Japan	13	1307
61.	Andrea Morassi	Italy	12	1308
61.	Marinus Kraus	Germany	12	1308
63.	Jan Ziobro	Poland	11	1309
64.	Vegard Swensen	Norway	9	1311
64.	Janne Happonen	Finland	9	1311
66.	Fredrik Bjerkeengen	Norway	8	1312
66.	Ole Marius Ingvaldsen	Norway	8	1312
66.	Felix Schoft	Germany	8	1312
66.	Aleksander Zniszczoł	Poland	8	1312
66.	Kento Sakuyama	Japan	8	1312
71.	Ville Larinto	Finland	7	1313
71.	Lukas Müller	Austria	7	1313
73.	Klemens Murańka	Poland	6	1314
74.	Kaarel Nurmsalu	Estland	5	1315
74.	Davide Bresadola	Italy	5	1315
76.	Atle Pedersen Rønsen	Norway	4	1316
77.	Simen Key Grimsrud	Norway	3	1317
78.	Hiroaki Watanabe	Japan	2	1318
78.	Anton Kaliniczenko	Russia	2	1318
80.	Krzysztof Biegun	Poland	1	1319

World Cup winners by nations before the Championships
Rank	Nation	Total	Loss to the leader
1.	Austria	4462	–
2.	Norway	4205	257
3.	Germany	3968	494
4.	Slovenia	3430	1032
5.	Poland	2102	2360
6.	Japan	1415	3047
7.	Czech Republic	1320	3142
8.	Russia	851	3611
9.	Switzerland	582	3880
10.	Italy	323	4139
11.	Finland	237	4225
12.	Bulgaria	160	4302
13.	USA	121	4341
14.	France	30	4432
15.	Canada	27	4435
16.	Estland	5	4457

World Cup standings (women) before the Championships
Rank	Jumper	Country	Total	Loss to the leader
1.	Sara Takanashi	Japan	1137	–
2.	Sarah Hendrickson	USA	847	290
3.	Coline Mattel	France	733	404
4.	Jacqueline Seifriedsberger	Austria	697	440
5.	Anette Sagen	Norway	551	586
6.	Katja Požun	Slovenia	425	712
7.	Carina Vogt	Germany	415	722
8.	Daniela Iraschko	Austria	390	747
9.	Lindsey Van	USA	386	751
10.	Špela Rogelj	Slovenia	358	779
11.	Jessica Jerome	USA	346	791
12.	Evelyn Insam	Italy	330	807
13.	Line Jahr	Norway	318	819
14.	Urša Bogataj	Slovenia	309	828
15.	Eva Logar	Slovenia	240	897
16.	Maja Vtič	Slovenia	225	912
17.	Anja Tepeš	Slovenia	215	922
18.	Yūki Itō	Japan	186	951
19.	Atsuko Tanaka	Canada	178	959
20.	Abby Hughes	USA	157	980
21.	Elena Runggaldier	Italy	138	999
22.	Katharina Althaus	Germany	122	1015
23.	Léa Lemare	France	118	1019
24.	Maren Lundby	Norway	117	1020
25.	Melanie Faißt	Germany	96	1041
26.	Wendy Vuik	Netherlands	90	1047
27.	Alexandra Pretorius	Canada	85	1052
28.	Misaki Shigeno	Japan	83	1054
29.	Yurika Hirayama	Japan	79	1058
30.	Svenja Würth	Germany	78	1059
31.	Alissa Johnson	USA	69	1068
32.	Bigna Windmüller	Switzerland	65	1072
33.	Julia Clair	France	63	1074
34.	Taylor Henrich	Canada	61	1076
35.	Ulrike Gräßler	Germany	51	1086
36.	Julia Kykkänen	Finland	43	1094
37.	Ramona Straub	Germany	40	1097
38.	Michaela Doleželová	Czech Republic	37	1100
39.	Ayumi Watase	Japan	30	1107
40.	Irina Awwakumowa	Russia	28	1109
41.	Anastasija Gładyszewa	Russia	23	1114
41.	Roberta D'Agostina	Italy	23	1114
43.	Juliane Seyfarth	Germany	22	1115
44.	Yurina Yamada	Japan	21	1116
45.	Ayuka Takeda	Japan	16	1121
45.	Liu Qi	China	16	1121
47.	Seiko Koasa	Japan	12	1125
48.	Barbara Klinec	Slovenia	11	1126
49.	Anna Häfele	Germany	8	1129
50.	Manuela Malsiner	Italy	6	1131
50.	Sonja Schoitsch	Austria	6	1131
52.	Gyda Enger	Norway	3	1134
53.	Aki Matsuhashi	Japan	1	1136
53.	Chiara Hölzl	Austria	1	1136
53.	Yoshiko Kasai	Japan	1	1136

In November 2012, for the first time, the mixed competition took place. It belonged to the World Cup. The winner was Norway (Maren Lundby, Tom Hilde, Anette Sagen, Anders Bardal); second place for Japan, and third - for Italy.

=== Favourites ===
One of the favourites, the gold medalist from Oslo, Daniela Iraschko, resign from the Championships because of injury. Sara Takanashi, Sarah Hendrickson, Coline Mattel, Evelyn Insam, Jacqueline Seifriedsberger, Anette Sagen and Katja Požun were seen as favourites.

In individual men competition at normal hill the favourites were Gregor Schlierenzauer, Anders Bardal, Richard Freitag, Severin Freund, Michael Neumayer and Manuel Fettner. The favourite became also the oldest jumper Noriaki Kasai, because of his long jump during training session.

In the mixed competition the favourites were Austria, Slovenia, Japan, Germany and Norway.

For gold medal in the team men competition the favourites were Austria, Norway, Japan and Germany. What is more, Poland and Slovenia were mentioned as favourites, too.

== Ski jumping hills ==
Three competitions took place at the normal hill - individual women and men competition and mixed competition. There were two competitions at the large hill - individual and team men competition.

Name	Place	Construction point	HS	Record			Gate factor	Wind factor
Trampolino Dal Ben	Predazzo	K-95	HS 106	107,5 m	Adam Małysz	28 February 2003	5,0 points/m	7,0 points/m/s
Trampolino Dal Ben	Predazzo	K-120	HS 134	136,0 m	Adam Małysz	22 February 2003	5,58 points/m	10,80 points/m/s

== Jury ==
Chief of the Competition were: Chika Yoshida (women competitions) and Walter Hofer (men competitions). Yoshida's assistant was Agnieszka Baczkowska, and Hofer's assistant was Miran Tepeš.

== Medalists ==
=== Men ===
==== Individual competition HS106 (23.02.2013) ====
Rank	Jumper	Jump 1	Jump 2	Total	Loss to the leader
1.	Anders Bardal	103,5 m 124,1 pkt	100,0 m 128,5 pkt	252,6 pkt	–
2.	Gregor Schlierenzauer	98,0 m 120,0 pkt	97,5 m 128,4 pkt	248,4 pkt	4,2 pkt
3.	Peter Prevc	102,5 m 118,3 pkt	98,5 m 126,0 pkt	244,3 pkt	8,3 pkt

==== Individual competition HS134 (28.02.2013) ====
Rank	Jumper	Jump 1	Jump 2	Total	Loss to the leader
1.	Kamil Stoch	131,5 m 144,9 pkt	130,0 m 150,9 pkt	295,8 pkt	–
2.	Peter Prevc	130,5 m 139,8 pkt	130,5 m 149,9 pkt	289,7 pkt	6,1 pkt
3.	Anders Jacobsen	129,0 m 138,4 pkt	131,0 m 150,7 pkt	289,1 pkt	6,7 pkt

==== Team competition HS134 (02.03.2013) ====
Rank	Team	Jumper	Jump 1	Jump 2	Points	Total	Loss to the leader
1.	Austria	Wolfgang Loitzl	130,5 m 150,2 pkt	128,0 m 146,7 pkt	296,9 pkt	1135,9 pkt	–
1.	Austria	Manuel Fettner	125,5 m 137,6 pkt	128,0 m 138,8 pkt	276,4 pkt	1135,9 pkt	–
1.	Austria	Thomas Morgenstern	121,0 m 137,0 pkt	129,5 m 144,5 pkt	281,5 pkt	1135,9 pkt	–
1.	Austria	Gregor Schlierenzauer	124,5 m 139,7 pkt	129,0 m 141,4 pkt	281,1 pkt	1135,9 pkt	–
2.	Germany	Andreas Wank	135,5 m 141,5 pkt	126,5 m 143,0 pkt	284,5 pkt	1121,8 pkt	14,1 pkt
2.	Germany	Severin Freund	122,0 m 137,3 pkt	125,0 m 134,7 pkt	272,0 pkt	1121,8 pkt	14,1 pkt
2.	Germany	Michael Neumayer	123,5 m 140,3 pkt	126,0 m 136,8 pkt	277,1 pkt	1121,8 pkt	14,1 pkt
2.	Germany	Richard Freitag	130,0 m 144,4 pkt	129,5 m 143,8 pkt	288,2 pkt	1121,8 pkt	14,1 pkt
3.	Poland	Maciej Kot	123,0 m 131,6 pkt	128,5 m 140,7 pkt	272,3 pkt	1121,0 pkt	14,9 pkt
3.	Poland	Piotr Żyła	122,0 m 135,9 pkt	126,0 m 134,7 pkt	270,6 pkt	1121,0 pkt	14,9 pkt
3.	Poland	Dawid Kubacki	126,0 m 138,9 pkt	128,0 m 137,3 pkt	276,2 pkt	1121,0 pkt	14,9 pkt
3.	Poland	Kamil Stoch	134,0 m 152,1 pkt	130,0 m 149,8 pkt	301,9 pkt	1121,0 pkt	14,9 pkt

=== Women ===
==== Individual competition HS106 (22.02.2013) ====
Rank	Jumper	Jump 1	Jump 2	Total	Loss to the leader
1.	Sarah Hendrickson	106,0 m 127,4 pkt	103,0 m 126,3 pkt	253,7 pkt	–
2.	Sara Takanashi	104,5 m 124,1 pkt	103,0 m 126,9 pkt	251,0 pkt	2,7 pkt
3.	Jacqueline Seifriedsberger	104,0 m 118,7 pkt	98,5 m 118,5 pkt	237,2 pkt	16,5 pkt

=== Mixed team competition HS106 (24.02.2013) ===
Rank	Team	Jumper	Jump 1	Jump 2	Points	Total	Loss to the leader
1.	Japan	Yūki Itō	90,0 m 108,1 pkt	91,5 m 110,1 pkt	218,2 pkt	1011,0 pkt	–
1.	Japan	Daiki Itō	100,0 m 127,8 pkt	100,0 m 131,3 pkt	259,1 pkt	1011,0 pkt	–
1.	Japan	Sara Takanashi	101,5 m 132,0 pkt	106,5 m 135,5 pkt	267,5 pkt	1011,0 pkt	–
1.	Japan	Taku Takeuchi	100,5 m 132,5 pkt	101,5 m 133,7 pkt	266,2 pkt	1011,0 pkt	–
2.	Austria	Chiara Hölzl	92,5 m 109,4 pkt	98,5 m 121,3 pkt	230,7 pkt	986,7 pkt	24,3 pkt
2.	Austria	Thomas Morgenstern	99,5 m 126,0 pkt	100,0 m 130,1 pkt	256,1 pkt	986,7 pkt	24,3 pkt
2.	Austria	Jacqueline Seifriedsberger	97,5 m 123,6 pkt	99,5 m 121,7 pkt	245,3 pkt	986,7 pkt	24,3 pkt
2.	Austria	Gregor Schlierenzauer	99,0 m 125,5 pkt	100,0 m 129,1 pkt	254,6 pkt	986,7 pkt	24,3 pkt
3.	Germany	Ulrike Gräßler	96,5 m 117,7 pkt	97,0 m 119,2 pkt	236,9 pkt	984,9 pkt	26,1 pkt
3.	Germany	Richard Freitag	102,5 m 132,5 pkt	97,0 m 123,8 pkt	256,3 pkt	984,9 pkt	26,1 pkt
3.	Germany	Carina Vogt	95,5 m 119,7 pkt	98,0 m 121,1 pkt	240,8 pkt	984,9 pkt	26,1 pkt
3.	Germany	Severin Freund	96,5 m 122,2 pkt	99,5 m 128,7 pkt	250,9 pkt	984,9 pkt	26,1 pkt

=== Medal count ===
Rank	Country	Gold	Silver	Bronze	Total
1.	Austria	1	2	1	4
2.	Japan	1	1	–	2
3.	Norway	1	–	1	2
3.	Poland	1	–	1	2
5.	United States	1	–	–	1
6.	Germany	–	1	1	2
6.	Slovenia	–	1	1	2

== Results ==
=== Men ===
==== Individual competition HS106 (23.02.2013) ====
Rank	Jumper	Country	Jump 1				Jump 2				Total
Rank	Jumper	Country	Distance	Gate	Wind	Points	Distance	Gate	Wind	Points	Total
1.	Anders Bardal	Norway	103,5	11	0,98	124,1	100,0	15	-0,22	128,5	252,6
2.	Gregor Schlierenzauer	Austria	98,0	9	0,72	120,0	97,5	13	-0,25	128,4	248,4
3.	Peter Prevc	Slovenia	102,5	12	1,09	118,3	98,5	15	-0,28	126,0	244,3
4.	Severin Freund	Germany	101,0	11	1,10	117,3	99,0	15	-0,18	125,3	242,6
5.	Thomas Morgenstern	Austria	100,0	12	0,64	114,4	100,5	15	-0,23	127,6	242,0
6.	Richard Freitag	Germany	103,5	11	1,67	119,3	97,5	15	-0,33	119,8	239,1
7.	Taku Takeuchi	Japan	102,2	12	1,28	115,9	98,0	15	-0,08	122,1	238,0
8.	Kamil Stoch	Poland	102,0	11	1,10	121,3	97,0	15	-0,15	116,1	237,4
9.	Andreas Wank	Germany	99,5	12	0,85	109,9	99,5	15	-0,41	127,4	237,3
10.	Tom Hilde	Norway	99,5	12	0,68	115,1	97,0	15	-0,14	120,5	235,6
11.	Maciej Kot	Poland	101,5	12	1,40	113,1	97,0	15	-0,44	121,6	234,7
12.	Jan Matura	Czech Republic	102,5	12	1,45	115,7	96,0	15	-0,07	118,0	233,7
13.	Andreas Stjernen	Norway	98,0	12	0,52	112,3	97,0	15	-0,26	121,3	233,6
14.	Vincent Descombes Sevoie	France	96,5	10	1,14	108,0	98,0	15	-0,28	123,0	231,0
15.	Daiki Itō	Japan	96,0	10	1,04	110,2	96,5	15	-0,49	120,4	230,6
16.	Simon Ammann	Switzerland	99,0	12	0,85	111,4	95,5	15	-0,44	118,1	229,5
17.	Wolfgang Loitzl	Austria	93,5	10	0,68	107,2	97,5	15	-0,08	121,1	228,3
18.	Michael Neumayer	Germany	98,5	12	0,56	110,0	96,5	15	-0,34	117,9	227,9
19.	Anders Jacobsen	Norway	96,5	11	0,71	109,0	97,0	15	0,02	117,9	226,9
20.	Manuel Fettner	Austria	96,0	12	0,44	106,3	97,0	15	-0,05	118,8	225,1
21.	Yūta Watase	Japan	95,0	10	0,95	107,3	95,5	15	-0,17	116,7	224,0
22.	Jaka Hvala	Slovenia	97,0	12	0,81	107,2	95,0	15	-0,16	115,1	222,3
23.	Piotr Żyła	Poland	95,5	12	0,42	106,5	95,0	15	-0,16	113,6	220,1
24.	Matjaž Pungertar	Slovenia	93,5	10	0,80	105,4	94,5	15	-0,18	114,3	219,7
25.	Lukáš Hlava	Czech Republic	92,5	10	0,46	105,3	93,5	15	-0,44	114,1	219,4
26.	Robert Kranjec	Slovenia	100,0	11	1,73	110,9	92,0	15	-0,47	108,3	219,2
26.	Kaarel Nurmsalu	Estland	95,0	10	1,02	106,9	94,0	15	-0,04	112,3	219,2
28.	Dmitrij Wasiljew	Russia	99,5	12	1,22	107,9	93,5	15	-0,10	107,2	215,1
29.	Roman Koudelka	Czech Republic	94,0	10	1,08	104,4	91,5	15	-0,49	108,9	213,3
30.	Andrea Morassi	Italy	96,5	10	1,02	110,4	88,0	15	-0,50	101,0	211,4
31.	Dawid Kubacki	Poland	93,5	10	0,73	103,4	nq				103,4
31.	Jakub Janda	Czech Republic	92,5	10	0,94	103,4	nq				103,4
33.	Stefan Kraft	Austria	92,5	10	0,98	101,6	nq				101,6
34.	Aleksiej Romaszow	Russia	92,5	10	0,80	101,4	nq				101,4
35.	Noriaki Kasai	Japan	92,5	12	0,08	100,8	nq				100,8
36.	Sebastian Colloredo	Italy	91,0	10	0,93	98,5	nq				98,5
37.	Anders Johnson	USA	93,5	10	1,45	98,3	nq				98,3
38.	Ronan Lamy Chappuis	France	91,0	10	0,92	98,1	nq				98,1
39.	Anssi Koivuranta	Finland	90,0	10	0,89	96,3	nq				96,3
40.	Władimir Zografski	Bulgaria	90,0	12	0,25	94,6	nq				94,6
41.	Gregor Deschwanden	Switzerland	88,0	10	0,49	94,1	nq				94,1
42.	Ville Larinto	Finland	89,5	10	1,01	93,9	nq				93,9
43.	Radik Żaparow	Kazakhstan	89,5	10	1,47	91,2	nq				91,2
44.	Davide Bresadola	Italy	88,0	10	0,97	90,2	nq				90,2
45.	Nikos Polichronidis	Greece	88,0	10	1,01	89,9	nq				89,9
46.	Ilja Roslakow	Russia	86,0	10	0,69	88,2	nq				88,2
47.	Martti Nõmme	Estland	86,5	10	0,69	87,7	nq				87,7
48.	Lauri Asikainen	Finland	86,0	10	0,79	86,5	nq				86,5
49.	Aleksiej Korolow	Kazakhstan	85,5	10	1,16	84,4	nq				84,4
50.	Sami Heiskanen	Finland	83,5	10	0,65	81,5	nq				81,5

==== Individual competition HS134 (28.02.2013) ====
Rank	Jumper	Country	Jump 1				Jump 2				Total
Rank	Jumper	Country	Distance	Gate	Wind	Points	Distance	Gate	Wind	Points	Total
1.	Kamil Stoch	Poland	131,5	21	-1,15	144,9	130,0	19	-0,81	150,9	295,8
2.	Peter Prevc	Slovenia	130,5	21	-0,98	139,8	130,5	19	-0,72	149,9	289,7
3.	Anders Jacobsen	Norway	129,0	21	-1,15	138,4	131,0	19	-0,67	150,7	289,1
4.	Wolfgang Loitzl	Austria	128,5	21	-1,11	138,1	132,5	21	-0,54	146,8	284,9
5.	Jan Matura	Czech Republic	127,5	21	-1,02	133,3	132,0	21	-0,88	148,1	281,4
6.	Richard Freitag	Germany	129,0	21	-1,08	137,7	128,5	19	-0,48	142,7	280,4
7.	Simon Ammann	Switzerland	127,5	21	-1,01	134,2	132,5	21	-0,80	145,6	279,8
8.	Gregor Schlierenzauer	Austria	125,0	21	-1,19	131,7	128,5	19	-0,88	147,5	279,2
9.	Severin Freund	Germany	126,5	21	-1,17	133,1	129,5	21	-0,90	144,3	277,4
10.	Daiki Itō	Japan	127,5	21	-1,17	135,4	127,0	19	-0,62	141,5	276,9
11.	Anders Bardal	Norway	127,5	21	-1,17	134,9	129,0	21	-0,77	141,5	276,4
11.	Andreas Wank	Germany	127,5	21	-1,18	136,0	129,5	21	-0,58	140,4	276,4
13.	Michael Neumayer	Germany	130,5	21	-1,01	134,6	124,0	18	-0,78	139,7	274,3
14.	Tom Hilde	Norway	127,5	21	-0,98	133,4	129,0	21	-0,74	140,2	273,6
15.	Manuel Fettner	Austria	126,5	21	-1,20	133,0	125,5	19	-0,84	139,7	272,7
16.	Thomas Morgenstern	Austria	126,0	21	-1,23	128,9	125,5	19	-1,09	142,9	271,8
17.	Taku Takeuchi	Japan	126,0	21	-1,12	132,7	126,0	21	-0,93	137,8	270,5
18.	Andreas Stjernen	Norway	125,0	21	-1,25	131,3	127,0	21	-0,88	137,6	268,9
19.	Piotr Żyła	Poland	124,0	21	-1,20	129,0	126,5	21	-1,10	139,1	268,1
20.	Dawid Kubacki	Poland	126,5	21	-1,06	130,4	126,0	21	-0,98	134,9	265,3
21.	Robert Kranjec	Slovenia	123,0	21	-1,10	126,1	126,5	21	-1,04	138,4	264,5
22.	Noriaki Kasai	Japan	125,0	21	-1,27	128,0	125,0	21	-1,08	135,7	263,7
23.	Stefan Kraft	Austria	124,5	21	-0,98	126,5	124,5	21	-1,08	135,8	262,3
24.	Lukáš Hlava	Czech Republic	121,5	21	-1,13	122,2	126,5	21	-1,06	138,1	260,3
25.	Jaka Hvala	Slovenia	122,0	21	-1,10	123,3	125,0	21	-1,11	136,5	259,8
26.	Kaarel Nurmsalu	Estland	121,0	19	-1,27	130,0	122,5	21	-1,01	129,4	259,4
27.	Maciej Kot	Poland	125,0	21	-1,18	130,5	122,5	21	-0,85	128,2	258,7
28.	Jurij Tepeš	Slovenia	122,0	21	-1,09	123,2	124,5	21	-1,05	134,9	258,1
29.	Vincent Descombes Sevoie	France	122,0	21	-1,39	121,9	126,5	21	-1,07	134,8	256,7
30.	Roman Koudelka	Czech Republic	120,5	21	-1,37	123,5	121,5	21	-0,95	127,0	250,5
31.	Władimir Zografski	Bulgaria	120,5	21	-1,22	121,4	nq				121,4
32.	Dienis Korniłow	Russia	121,0	21	-1,08	120,8	nq				120,8
32.	Sebastian Colloredo	Italy	122,0	21	-0,92	120,8	nq				120,8
34.	Yūta Watase	Japan	119,0	21	-1,31	119,6	nq				119,6
35.	Roberto Dellasega	Italy	115,5	19	-1,29	119,3	nq				119,3
36.	Dmitrij Wasiljew	Russia	118,5	21	-1,09	115,9	nq				115,9
37.	Ilja Roslakow	Russia	118,0	21	-1,30	114,7	nq				114,7
38.	Andrea Morassi	Italy	112,0	19	-1,44	112,7	nq				112,7
39.	Anders Johnson	USA	111,0	19	-1,07	107,4	nq				107,4
40.	Radik Żaparow	Kazakhstan	111,0	19	-1,08	106,0	nq				106,0
41.	Aleksiej Romaszow	Russia	109,0	19	-1,36	105,9	nq				105,9
42.	Marco Grigoli	Switzerland	110,0	19	-1,01	103,9	nq				103,9
43.	Gregor Deschwanden	Switzerland	112,5	21	-1,20	103,8	nq				103,8
44.	Carl Nordin	Sweden	110,0	19	-1,08	102,7	nq				102,7
45.	Anssi Koivuranta	Finland	105,5	19	-1,23	98,2	nq				98,2
46.	Jakub Janda	Czech Republic	104,5	19	-1,33	95,0	nq				95,0
47.	Ville Larinto	Finland	103,5	19	-1,36	94,5	nq				94,5
48.	Lauri Asikainen	Finland	106,0	21	-1,16	91,1	nq				91,1
49.	Martti Nõmme	Estland	104,0	19	-1,04	90,9	nq				90,9
50.	Peter Frenette	USA	98,0	19	-1,41	83,1	nq				83,1

==== Team competition HS134 (02.03.2013) ====
Rank	Team	Jumper	Jump 1				Jump 2				Total
Rank	Team	Jumper	Distance	Gate	Wind	Points	Distance	Gate	Wind	Points	Total
1.	Austria	Wolfgang Loitzl	130,5	21	-1,32	150,2	128,0	19	-0,89	146,7	1135,9
1.	Austria	Manuel Fettner	125,5	21	-1,55	137,6	128,0	20	-0,96	138,8	1135,9
1.	Austria	Thomas Morgenstern	121,0	20	-1,39	137,0	129,5	19	-0,80	144,5	1135,9
1.	Austria	Gregor Schlierenzauer	124,5	19	-0,87	139,7	129,0	18	-0,49	141,4	1135,9
2.	Germany	Andreas Wank	135,5	21	-0,33	141,5	126,5	19	-1,07	143,0	1121,8
2.	Germany	Severin Freund	122,0	21	-1,73	137,3	125,0	20	-0,94	134,7	1121,8
2.	Germany	Michael Neumayer	123,5	21	-1,55	140,3	126,0	19	-0,85	136,8	1121,8
2.	Germany	Richard Freitag	130,0	20	-0,83	144,4	129,5	18	-0,58	143,8	1121,8
3.	Poland	Maciej Kot	123,0	21	-1,08	131,6	128,5	21	-0,87	140,7	1121,0
3.	Poland	Piotr Żyła	122,0	21	-1,56	135,9	126,0	20	-0,78	134,7	1121,0
3.	Poland	Dawid Kubacki	126,0	22	-1,17	138,9	128,0	20	-0,82	137,3	1121,0
3.	Poland	Kamil Stoch	134,0	21	-0,78	152,1	130,0	17	-0,80	149,8	1121,0
4.	Norway	Andreas Stjernen	125,5	21	-1,31	139,5	125,0	19	-1,07	143,3	1117,3
4.	Norway	Tom Hilde	122,0	21	-1,60	134,9	118,0	19	-1,01	123,1	1117,3
4.	Norway	Anders Bardal	128,5	22	-1,35	146,9	129,0	19	-0,71	144,7	1117,3
4.	Norway	Anders Jacobsen	125,5	19	-0,75	139,2	131,5	18	-0,38	145,7	1117,3
5.	Japan	Reruhi Shimizu	124,5	21	-1,47	139,5	118,5	21	-0,96	121,2	1099,1
5.	Japan	Noriaki Kasai	122,0	21	-1,26	129,7	131,0	20	-0,87	144,7	1099,1
5.	Japan	Daiki Ito	128,0	22	-1,34	143,9	130,5	20	-0,83	139,9	1099,1
5.	Japan	Taku Takeuchi	128,0	21	-1,18	144,1	127,0	19	-0,83	136,1	1099,1
6.	Slovenia	Robert Kranjec	122,0	21	-1,04	128,8	126,0	21	-0,87	133,2	1046,4
6.	Slovenia	Jurij Tepeš	115,0	21	-1,35	116,1	126,5	20	-0,74	135,2	1046,4
6.	Slovenia	Jaka Hvala	117,5	22	-0,97	120,0	122,0	20	-0,78	126,0	1046,4
6.	Slovenia	Peter Prevc	127,0	19	-0,77	144,6	130,0	19	-0,69	142,5	1046,4
7.	Czech Republic	Roman Koudelka	118,0	21	-1,17	123,0	124,5	21	-1,00	133,4	1022,1
7.	Czech Republic	Lukáš Hlava	120,5	21	-1,32	125,2	125,0	20	-0,75	128,1	1022,1
7.	Czech Republic	Jakub Janda	118,5	22	-1,30	124,8	114,0	20	-1,04	113,4	1022,1
7.	Czech Republic	Jan Matura	124,5	21	-1,00	134,4	128,5	19	-0,88	139,8	1022,1
8.	Italy	Roberto Dellasega	117,0	21	-1,58	125,7	120,0	21	-1,04	124,2	965,9
8.	Italy	Andrea Morassi	124,0	21	-1,43	133,1	121,0	20	-0,74	124,3	965,9
8.	Italy	Davide Bresadola	109,5	22	-1,55	108,8	107,0	20	-1,11	98,1	965,9
8.	Italy	Sebastian Colloredo	122,5	21	-1,12	130,6	120,0	19	-0,66	121,1	965,9
9.	Russia	Aleksiej Romaszow	122,0	21	-1,26	128,2	nq				498,1
9.	Russia	Dienis Korniłow	119,5	21	-1,46	127,9	nq				498,1
9.	Russia	Ilja Roslakow	116,5	22	-1,37	120,0	nq				498,1
9.	Russia	Dmitrij Wasiljew	119,5	21	-1,06	122,0	nq				498,1
10.	Switzerland	Simon Ammann	118,5	21	-1,37	124,6	nq				469,1
10.	Switzerland	Killian Peier	110,0	21	-1,33	107,4	nq				469,1
10.	Switzerland	Marco Grigoli	114,0	22	-1,55	117,9	nq				469,1
10.	Switzerland	Gregor Deschwanden	118,0	21	-0,95	119,2	nq				469,1
11.	Finland	Sami Helskanen	109,5	21	-1,26	105,2	nq				430,2
11.	Finland	Ville Larinto	108,0	21	-1,22	101,1	nq				430,2
11.	Finland	Lauri Asikainen	112,5	22	-1,35	112,1	nq				430,2
11.	Finland	Anssi Koivuranta	112,5	21	-1,28	111,8	nq				430,2
12.	Kazakhstan	Sabyrżan Momynow	96,0	21	-1,45	76,0	nq				375,6
12.	Kazakhstan	Aleksiej Korolow	109,5	21	-0,92	102,0	nq				375,6
12.	Kazakhstan	Radik Żaparow	113,0	22	-1,33	113,8	nq				375,6
12.	Kazakhstan	Konstantin Sokolenko	100,5	21	-1,01	83,8	nq				375,6

=== Women ===
==== Individual competition HS106 (22.02.2013) ====
Rank	Jumper	Country	Jump 1				Jump 2				Total
Rank	Jumper	Country	Distance	Gate	Wind	Points	Distance	Gate	Wind	Points	Total
1.	Sarah Hendrickson	USA	106,0	23	0,77	127,4	103,0	21	0,96	126,3	253,7
2.	Sara Takanashi	Japan	104,5	23	0,24	124,1	103,0	21	0,44	126,9	251,0
3.	Jacqueline Seifriedsberger	Austria	104,0	23	0,52	118,7	98,5	21	0,22	118,5	237,2
4.	Coline Mattel	France	102,0	23	0,73	118,2	95,5	21	0,75	111,3	229,5
5.	Carina Vogt	Germany	99,5	23	0,31	115,6	96,0	21	0,81	109,8	225,4
6.	Jessica Jerome	USA	100,0	23	0,64	111,8	98,0	21	0,70	113,1	224,9
7.	Anette Sagen	Norway	97,0	23	0,57	105,3	94,5	21	0,28	108,0	213,3
8.	Evelyn Insam	Italy	96,0	23	0,53	106,1	92,5	21	0,52	104,4	210,5
9.	Chiara Hölzl	Austria	95,5	21	1,23	98,9	94,5	21	1,08	105,4	204,3
10.	Julia Kykkänen	Finland	92,5	21	0,76	103,2	90,0	21	0,28	100,0	203,2
11.	Ulrike Gräßler	Germany	89,5	21	0,28	98,0	95,0	21	1,02	103,9	201,9
12.	Elena Runggaldier	Italy	89,0	21	0,40	97,2	93,0	21	0,61	103,7	200,9
13.	Špela Rogelj	Slovenia	91,0	23	0,38	95,6	93,5	21	0,82	104,8	200,4
13.	Irina Awwakumowa	Russia	94,0	21	0,91	102,1	91,0	21	0,38	98,3	200,4
15.	Atsuko Tanaka	Canada	92,0	23	0,35	97,3	93,0	21	0,87	102,9	200,2
16.	Lindsey Van	USA	89,0	23	0,31	90,6	93,5	21	0,46	107,8	198,4
17.	Urša Bogataj	Slovenia	90,0	23	-0,14	96,3	92,0	21	0,30	99,4	195,7
18.	Katja Požun	Slovenia	91,0	23	0,32	95,6	90,5	21	0,44	99,4	195,0
19.	Maja Vtič	Slovenia	86,0	23	-0,26	88,1	94,5	21	0,90	106,7	194,8
20.	Yūki Itō	Japan	90,5	23	0,12	95,5	91,0	21	0,82	98,8	194,3
21.	Svenja Würth	Germany	93,0	21	1,01	100,9	89,0	21	0,64	93,0	193,9
22.	Misaki Shigeno	Japan	91,0	21	1,01	97,9	88,0	21	0,68	93,2	191,1
23.	Bigna Windmüller	Switzerland	89,5	21	0,83	95,7	87,5	21	0,23	93,9	189,6
24.	Yurika Hirayama	Japan	90,5	21	1,06	96,6	86,5	21	0,51	91,4	188,0
25.	Maren Lundby	Norway	85,5	21	0,66	86,4	92,5	21	0,88	101,3	187,7
26.	Anastasija Gładyszewa	Russia	89,5	21	1,51	89,4	88,5	21	0,95	91,3	180,7
27.	Wendy Vuik	Netherlands	88,5	21	0,83	93,2	85,5	21	0,91	84,6	177,8
28.	Michaela Doleželová	Czech Republic	85,0	21	0,96	83,3	87,5	21	1,07	88,5	171,8
29.	Manuela Malsiner	Italy	87,0	21	1,65	81,9	87,0	21	1,52	83,9	165,8
30.	Chang Xinyue	China	89,5	21	1,49	85,1	83,5	21	0,75	77,3	162,4
31.	Roberta D'Agostina	Italy	85,0	21	1,14	81,5	nq				81,5
32.	Katharina Althau	Germany	82,0	21	0,58	80,4	nq				80,4
33.	Abby Hughes	USA	81,5	21	0,25	80,2	nq				80,2
34.	Alexandra Pretorius	Canada	85,0	21	1,10	79,8	nq				79,8
35.	Julia Clair	France	82,0	21	0,64	79,0	nq				79,0
36.	Katharina Keil	Austria	85,0	21	1,85	77,6	nq				77,6
37.	Line Jahr	Norway	90,0	23	0,12	72,0	nq				72,0
38.	Léa Lemare	France	84,0	21	0,46	70,3	nq				70,3
39.	Vladěna Pustková	Czech Republic	79,0	21	1,17	67,8	nq				67,8
40.	Liu Qi	China	80,0	21	1,25	66,2	nq				66,2
41.	Taylor Henrich	Canada	67,0	21	0,12	49,7	nq				49,7
42.	Li Xueyao	China	70,0	21	1,12	44,2	nq				44,2
43.	Daniela Haralambie	Romania	67,5	21	1,44	37,4	nq				37,4

=== Mixed competition HS106 (24.02.2013) ===
Rank	Team	Jumper	Jump 1				Jump 2				Total
Rank	Team	Jumper	Distance	Gate	Wind	Points	Distance	Gate	Wind	Points	Total
1.	Japan	Yūki Itō	90,0	29	-0,94	108,1	91,5	29	-0,66	110,1	1011,0
1.	Japan	Daiki Itō	100,0	17	-0,33	127,8	100,0	17	-0,62	131,3	1011,0
1.	Japan	Sara Takanashi	101,5	27	-0,78	132,0	106,5	27	-0,22	135,5	1011,0
1.	Japan	Taku Takeuchi	100,5	17	-0,72	132,5	101,5	17	-0,38	133,7	1011,0
2.	Austria	Chiara Hölzl	92,5	29	-0,91	109,4	98,5	29	-0,05	121,3	986,7
2.	Austria	Thomas Morgenstern	99,5	17	-0,28	126,0	100,0	17	-0,45	130,1	986,7
2.	Austria	Jacqueline Seifriedsberger	97,5	27	-0,80	123,6	99,5	27	-0,46	121,7	986,7
2.	Austria	Gregor Schlierenzauer	99,0	17	-0,50	125,5	100,0	17	-0,44	129,1	986,7
3.	Germany	Ulrike Gräßler	96,5	29	-0,60	117,7	97,0	29	-0,46	119,2	984,9
3.	Germany	Richard Freitag	102,5	17	-0,21	132,5	97,0	17	-0,61	123,8	984,9
3.	Germany	Carina Vogt	95,5	27	-0,88	119,7	98,0	27	-0,30	121,1	984,9
3.	Germany	Severin Freund	96,5	17	-0,74	122,2	99,5	17	-0,39	128,7	984,9
4.	Norway	Maren Lundby	91,0	29	-0,77	109,9	93,0	29	-0,26	111,8	969,3
4.	Norway	Tom Hilde	102,0	17	-0,03	130,7	98,5	17	-0,50	126,0	969,3
4.	Norway	Anette Sagen	92,5	27	-0,65	109,0	96,5	27	-0,40	117,3	969,3
4.	Norway	Anders Bardal	100,5	17	-0,44	131,6	101,0	17	-0,65	133,0	969,3
5.	France	Léa Lemare	93,5	29	-0,62	113,8	94,0	29	-0,71	117,0	941,2
5.	France	Ronan Lamy Chappuis	91,0	17	-1,03	111,7	94,0	17	-0,34	114,4	941,2
5.	France	Coline Mattel	93,5	27	-0,59	113,6	95,0	27	-0,44	118,6	941,2
5.	France	Vincent Descombes Sevoie	99,0	17	-0,47	126,8	100,0	17	-0,26	125,3	941,2
6.	United States	Jessica Jerome	98,0	29	-0,91	124,9	98,5	29	-0,54	125,3	938,4
6.	United States	Peter Frenette	89,5	17	-0,32	103,7	86,5	17	-0,60	99,2	938,4
6.	United States	Sarah Hendrickson	99,0	27	-0,82	130,7	104,5	27	-0,25	138,8	938,4
6.	United States	Anders Johnson	90,0	17	-0,70	106,9	91,5	17	-0,48	108,9	938,4
7.	Italy	Elena Runggaldier	94,0	29	-0,72	116,5	98,5	29	-0,77	125,9	923,1
7.	Italy	Andrea Morassi	92,0	17	-0,87	111,6	92,5	17	-0,62	112,3	923,1
7.	Italy	Evelyn Insam	89,5	27	-0,82	106,2	93,5	27	-0,40	112,3	923,1
7.	Italy	Sebastian Colloredo	95,0	17	-0,33	115,8	97,5	17	-0,36	122,5	923,1
8.	Slovenia	Urša Bogataj	95,5	29	-0,51	114,1	97,5	29	-0,29	120,0	920,0
8.	Slovenia	Jaka Hvala	95,5	17	0,01	114,9	92,0	17	-0,61	110,8	920,0
8.	Slovenia	Špela Rogelj	88,5	27	-0,73	103,6	93,5	27	-0,30	112,1	920,0
8.	Slovenia	Peter Prevc	96,0	17	-0,56	120,4	98,0	17	-0,37	124,1	920,0
9.	Russia	Anastasija Gładyszewa	88,5	29	-0,43	101,0	nq				427,7
9.	Russia	Dienis Korniłow	95,0	17	-0,66	117,6	nq				427,7
9.	Russia	Irina Awwakumowa	89,5	27	-0,51	103,6	nq				427,7
9.	Russia	Dmitrij Wasiljew	91,0	17	-0,50	105,5	nq				427,7
10.	Czech Republic	Michaela Doleželová	87,5	29	-0,80	100,6	nq				417,1
10.	Czech Republic	Jakub Janda	94,5	17	-0,54	116,8	nq				417,1
10.	Czech Republic	Vladěna Pustková	77,5	27	-0,60	76,2	nq				417,1
10.	Czech Republic	Jan Matura	97,5	17	-0,43	123,5	nq				417,1

== Accidents ==
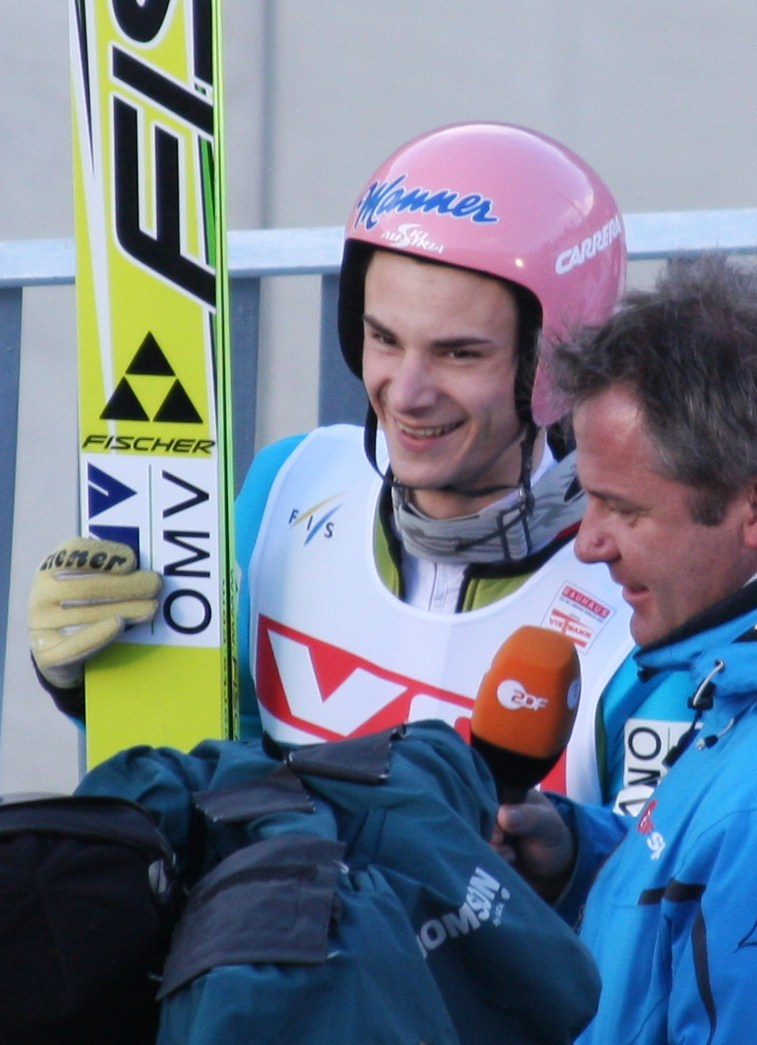
Manuel Fettner

There were two accidents during the individual women competition at normal hill. Line Jahr fell after her 90-meter jump and Léa Lemare fell after she jumped 84 meters.

During the individual men competition at large hill, Thomas Morgenstern fell after his first jump. It happen just after he crossed the fall line and his notes were normal. Because of the fall, Morgenstern's knee was injured and he couldn't jump in some competitions after the Championships.

During the team men competition, Manuel Fettner managed not to fall before the fall line. His right ski got detached but he managed to keep the balance until the fall line.
