= FIS Nordic World Ski Championships 2011 – Individual large hill =

Men's individual large hill at the FIS Nordic World Ski Championships 2011
- Venue: Holmenkollbakken
- Date: 3 March 2011
- Competitors: 63 from 20 nations
- Winning score: 277.5

Medalists
gold medal	Gregor Schlierenzauer	Austria
silver medal	Thomas Morgenstern	Austria
bronze medal	Simon Ammann	Switzerland

The Men's Individual large hill ski jumping event at the FIS Nordic World Ski Championships 2011 was held on 3 March 2011 at 17:00 CET. The qualification for this event was planned for 2 March 2011 at 18:00 CET, but it was postponed due to wind and fog to 3 March 2011 at 15:30 CET. Andreas Küttel of Switzerland was the defending world champion while his fellow country man Simon Ammann was the Olympic champion.

== Results ==
=== Qualifying ===
Rank	Bib	Name	Country	Distance (m)	Points	Notes
1	50	Anders Jacobsen	Norway	129.5	137.1	Q
2	52	Daiki Ito	Japan	131.5	135.7	Q
3	48	Anders Bardal	Norway	128.5	131.3	Q
4	53	Johan Remen Evensen	Norway	129.5	128.5	Q
5	42	Jan Matura	Czech Republic	128.0	127.6	Q
6	47	Pavel Karelin	Russia	127.0	125.6	Q
7	37	Richard Freitag	Germany	124.5	123.2	Q
8	40	Jakub Janda	Czech Republic	125.5	123.1	Q
9	45	Noriaki Kasai	Japan	123.5	120.1	Q
10	36	Jurij Tepeš	Slovenia	122.5	119.1	Q
11	26	Vladimir Zografski	Bulgaria	124.5	117.6	Q
12	41	Martin Schmitt	Germany	124.0	117.1	Q
13	46	Robert Kranjec	Slovenia	124.5	117.0	Q
13	39	Denis Kornilov	Russia	124.5	117.0	Q
15	29	Sebastian Colloredo	Italy	124.5	116.6	Q
16	49	Michael Uhrmann	Germany	121.0	116.2	Q
17	43	Emmanuel Chedal	France	122.5	115.9	Q
18	51	Roman Koudelka	Czech Republic	120.0	115.4	Q
19	25	Piotr Żyła	Poland	122.0	115.1	Q
20	27	Lukáš Hlava	Czech Republic	122.5	112.8	Q
21	44	Peter Prevc	Slovenia	120.5	111.2	Q
22	32	Fumihisa Yumoto	Japan	118.0	110.8	Q
23	30	Jernej Damjan	Slovenia	119.0	109.0	Q
24	35	Anssi Koivuranta	Finland	116.0	108.4	Q
25	38	Stefan Hula	Poland	118.0	106.6	Q
26	33	Olli Muotka	Finland	116.0	106.1	Q
27	20	Ilya Rosliakov	Russia	117.5	105.2	Q
28	23	Davide Bresadola	Italy	117.5	103.4	Q
29	34	Janne Ahonen	Finland	114.0	102.6	Q
30	28	Andrea Morassi	Italy	118.0	101.1	Q
31	9	Nicolas Mayer	France	114.5	98.8	Q
32	17	Andreas Küttel	Switzerland	117.5	97.7	Q
33	10	Radik Zhaparov	Kazakhstan	114.5	97.5	Q
34	31	Taku Takeuchi	Japan	112.0	97.0	Q
34	6	Nikolay Karpenko	Kazakhstan	115.5	97.0	Q
36	22	Mackenzie Boyd-Clowes	Canada	113.5	96.9	Q
37	24	Peter Frenette	United States	114.0	96.2	Q
38	12	Marco Grigoli	Switzerland	112.5	95.3	Q
39	4	Vincent Descombes Sevoie	France	111.5	90.7	Q
40	11	Kim Hyun-Ki	South Korea	109.0	85.6	Q
41	1	Carl Nordin	Sweden	108.5	84.2	
42	7	Siim-Tanel Sammelselg	Estonia	108.0	83.7	
43	14	Illimar Pärn	Estonia	110.0	83.5	
44	8	Volodymyr Boshchuk	Ukraine	108.5	83.4	
45	2	Tomáš Zmoray	Slovakia	107.0	81.6	
46	15	Evgeni Levkin	Kazakhstan	109.0	81.1	
47	19	Roman Trofimov	Russia	107.5	80.6	
48	21	Choi Heung-Chul	South Korea	105.0	80.1	
49	16	Vitaliy Shumbarets	Ukraine	106.0	79.0	
50	3	Oleksandr Lazarovych	Ukraine	101.0	70.9	
51	13	Alexey Korolev	Kazakhstan	98.0	63.4	
*	54	Kamil Stoch	Poland	126.5		Q ,
*	55	Gregor Schlierenzauer	Austria	127.5		Q ,
*	56	Severin Freund	Germany	128.0		Q ,
*	57	Matti Hautamäki	Finland	129.0		Q ,
*	58	Martin Koch	Austria	131.0		Q ,
*	59	Tom Hilde	Norway	125.0		Q ,
*	60	Andreas Kofler	Austria	124.5		Q ,
*	61	Adam Małysz	Poland	129.0		Q ,
*	62	Simon Ammann	Switzerland	134.0		Q ,
*	63	Thomas Morgenstern	Austria	134.5		Q ,
	5	Diego Dellasega	Italy	DNS		
	18	Fredrik Balkaasen	Sweden	DSQ		

1: These skiers were pre-qualified; they did perform jumps in the qualification round, but were not ranked with the non-pre-qualified jumpers.

=== Competition Round ===
Rank	Bib	Name	Country	Round 1 Distance (m)	Round 1 Points	Round 1 Rank	Final Round Distance (m)	Final Round Points	Final Round Rank	Total Points
1st place, gold medalist(s)	55	Gregor Schlierenzauer	Austria	130.0	135.3	4	134.5	142.2	2	277.5
2nd place, silver medalist(s)	63	Thomas Morgenstern	Austria	133.0	141.5	1	131.0	135.7	4	277.2
3rd place, bronze medalist(s)	62	Simon Ammann	Switzerland	129.5	131.9	8	134.5	142.4	1	274.3
4	60	Andreas Kofler	Austria	129.5	131.0	9	134.0	138.6	3	269.6
5	57	Matti Hautamäki	Finland	134.5	134.9	5	129.0	131.3	6	266.2
6	49	Michael Uhrmann	Germany	133.0	133.7	7	129.0	130.3	8	264.0
7	48	Anders Bardal	Norway	133.5	135.6	3	125.0	128.2	11	263.8
8	58	Martin Koch	Austria	130.0	129.7	11	129.5	132.6	5	262.3
9	50	Anders Jacobsen	Norway	134.0	139.4	2	123.0	121.3	14	260.7
10	59	Tom Hilde	Norway	133.5	128.7	12	128.5	130.3	8	259.0
11	61	Adam Małysz	Poland	126.0	128.1	13	130.5	129.5	10	257.6
12	56	Severin Freund	Germany	129.5	129.8	10	126.0	125.4	13	255.2
13	30	Jernej Damjan	Slovenia	123.0	116.8	22	131.5	130.4	7	247.2
14	53	Johan Remen Evensen	Norway	125.5	123.7	16	119.5	121.1	15	244.8
15	37	Richard Freitag	Germany	129.5	125.4	14	123.5	119.3	17	244.7
16	41	Martin Schmitt	Germany	116.0	115.5	23	128.5	127.3	12	242.8
17	47	Pavel Karelin	Russia	127.0	124.3	15	119.5	113.4	23	237.7
18	52	Daiki Ito	Japan	123.0	120.5	19	123.5	115.8	20	236.3
19	54	Kamil Stoch	Poland	131.0	134.7	6	124.5	101.0	30	235.7
20	36	Jurij Tepeš	Slovenia	128.5	120.9	18	121.5	114.7	22	235.6
21	25	Piotr Żyła	Poland	121.0	113.9	25	124.5	119.0	18	232.9
22	51	Roman Koudelka	Czech Republic	118.5	111.5	27	125.0	120.3	16	231.8
23	46	Robert Kranjec	Slovenia	125.0	120.0	20	121.0	110.1	24	230.1
24	45	Noriaki Kasai	Japan	125.5	122.5	17	114.5	105.7	27	228.2
25	44	Peter Prevc	Slovenia	118.5	110.3	28	123.0	116.2	19	226.5
26	31	Taku Takeuchi	Japan	120.5	108.6	29	122.5	115.5	21	224.1
27	32	Fumihisa Yumoto	Japan	126.0	119.2	21	117.5	104.4	28	223.6
28	40	Jakub Janda	Czech Republic	118.0	114.4	24	117.5	108.1	25	222.5
29	29	Sebastian Colloredo	Italy	118.0	111.8	26	120.0	106.8	26	218.6
30	34	Janne Ahonen	Finland	121.0	108.0	30	115.0	101.1	29	209.1
31	20	Ilya Rosliakov	Russia	119.5	106.2	31				106.2
32	39	Denis Kornilov	Russia	116.0	105.9	32				105.9
33	38	Stefan Hula	Poland	118.0	104.8	33				104.8
33	35	Anssi Koivuranta	Finland	118.5	104.8	33				104.8
35	24	Peter Frenette	United States	117.5	104.7	35				104.7
36	23	Davide Bresadola	Italy	117.5	104.0	36				104.0
37	26	Vladimir Zografski	Bulgaria	113.5	102.6	37				102.6
38	33	Olli Muotka	Finland	118.0	102.2	38				102.2
39	22	Mackenzie Boyd-Clowes	Canada	117.5	100.2	39				100.2
40	42	Jan Matura	Czech Republic	110.0	98.9	40				98.9
41	28	Andrea Morassi	Italy	111.0	97.9	41				97.9
42	43	Emmanuel Chedal	France	111.5	95.3	42				95.3
43	17	Andreas Küttel	Switzerland	112.0	91.5	43				91.5
44	10	Radik Zhaparov	Kazakhstan	110.5	89.9	44				89.9
45	12	Marco Grigoli	Switzerland	109.5	89.7	45				89.7
46	6	Nikolay Karpenko	Kazakhstan	107.5	88.9	46				88.9
47	27	Lukáš Hlava	Czech Republic	105.0	88.7	47				88.7
48	9	Nicolas Mayer	France	106.0	84.8	48				84.8
49	4	Vincent Descombes Sevoie	France	102.5	78.9	49				78.9
50	11	Kim Hyun-Ki	South Korea	100.5	67.4	50				67.4
