= FIS Nordic World Ski Championships 2013 – Team large hill =

Team large hill at the FIS Nordic World Ski Championships 2013
- Date: 2 March 2013
- Competitors: 48 from 12 nations
- Winning points: 1135.9

Medalists
gold medal	Wolfgang Loitzl; Manuel Fettner; Thomas Morgenstern; Gregor Schlierenzauer	Austria
silver medal	Andreas Wank; Severin Freund; Michael Neumayer; Richard Freitag	Germany
bronze medal	Maciej Kot; Piotr Żyła; Dawid Kubacki; Kamil Stoch	Poland

The Team large hill took place on 2 March 2013, Austria won, ahead of Germany and Poland.

The Austrian win was almost jeopardized by a ski malfunction in Manuel Fettner's second jump. His right ski unclipped during the landing, but Fettner managed to stay upright until he passed the fall line and Austria kept their lead. It is the first time someone managed this in a World Championship. The time between the end of the competition and the flower ceremony was chaotic due to a point reduction given to Norway, which initially was declared silver medalists. The reason for the point deduction was a human error done by the start gate official who moved the start gate up instead of down, as the Norwegian coach requested, on Anders Bardal's first jump.

== Results ==
The final was started at 16:30.

Rank	Bib	Country	Round 1 Distance (m)	Round 1 Points	Round 1 Rank	Final Round Distance (m)	Final Round Points	Final Round Rank	Total Points
1st place, gold medalist(s)	12	Austria; Wolfgang Loitzl; Manuel Fettner; Thomas Morgenstern; Gregor Schlierenzauer	130.5; 125.5; 121.0; 124.5	564.5; 150.2; 137.6; 137.0; 139.7	1	128.0; 128.0; 129.5; 129.0	571.4; 146.7; 138.8; 144.5; 141.4	1	1135.9; 296.9; 276.4; 281.5; 281.1
2nd place, silver medalist(s)	10	Germany; Andreas Wank; Severin Freund; Michael Neumayer; Richard Freitag	135.5; 122.0; 123.5; 130.0	563.5; 141.5; 137.3; 140.3; 144.4	2	126.5; 125.0; 126.0; 129.5	558.3; 143.0; 134.7; 136.8; 143.8	3	1121.8; 284.5; 272.0; 277.1; 288.2
3rd place, bronze medalist(s)	8	Poland; Maciej Kot; Piotr Żyła; Dawid Kubacki; Kamil Stoch	123.0; 122.0; 126.0; 134.0	558.5; 131.6; 135.9; 138.9; 152.1	4	128.5; 126.0; 128.0; 130.0	562.5; 140.7; 134.7; 137.3; 149.8	2	1121.0; 272.3; 270.6; 276.2; 301.9
4	11	Norway; Andreas Stjernen; Tom Hilde; Anders Bardal; Anders Jacobsen	125.5; 122.0; 128.5; 125.5	560.5; 139.5; 134.9; 146.9; 139.2	3	125.0; 118.0; 129.0; 131.5	556.8; 143.3; 123.1; 144.7; 145.7	4	1117.3; 282.8; 258.0; 298.3; 284.9
5	7	Japan; Reruhi Shimizu; Noriaki Kasai; Daiki Ito; Taku Takeuchi	124.5; 122.0; 128.0; 128.0	557.2; 139.5; 129.7; 143.9; 144.1	5	118.5; 131.0; 130.5; 127.0	541.9; 121.2; 144.7; 139.9; 136.1	6	1099.1; 260.7; 274.4; 283.8; 280.2
6	9	Slovenia; Robert Kranjec; Jurij Tepeš; Jaka Hvala; Peter Prevc	122.0; 115.0; 117.5; 127.0	509.5; 128.8; 116.1; 120.0; 144.6	6	126.0; 126.5; 122.0; 130.0	554.9; 133.2; 135.2; 126.0; 142.5	5	1046.4; 262.0; 251.3; 246.0; 287.1
7	6	Czech Republic; Roman Koudelka; Lukáš Hlava; Jakub Janda; Jan Matura	118.0; 120.5; 118.5; 124.5	507.4; 123.0; 125.2; 124.8; 134.4	7	124.5; 125.0; 114.0; 128.5	514.7; 133.4; 128.1; 113.4; 139.8	7	1022.1; 256.4; 253.3; 238.2; 274.2
8	3	Italy; Roberto Dellasega; Andrea Morassi; Davide Bresadola; Sebastian Colloredo	117.0; 124.0; 109.5; 122.5	498.2; 125.7; 133.1; 108.8; 130.6	8	120.0; 121.0; 107.0; 120.0	467.7; 124.2; 124.3; 98.1; 121.1	8	965.9; 249.9; 257.4; 206.9; 251.7
9	5	Russia; Alexey Romashov; Denis Kornilov; Ilya Rosliakov; Dimitry Vassiliev	122.0; 119.5; 116.5; 119.5	498.1; 128.2; 127.9; 120.0; 122.0	9				
10	4	Switzerland; Simon Ammann; Killian Peier; Marco Grigoli; Gregor Deschwanden	118.5; 110.0; 114.0; 118.0	469.1; 124.6; 107.4; 117.9; 119.2	10				
11	2	Finland; Sami Heiskanen; Ville Larinto; Lauri Asikainen; Anssi Koivuranta	109.5; 108.0; 112.5; 112.5	430.2; 105.2; 101.1; 112.1; 111.8	11				
12	1	Kazakhstan; Sabirzhan Muminov; Alexey Korolev; Radik Zhaparov; Konstantin Sokolenko	96.0; 109.5; 92.8; 100.5	375.6; 76.0; 102.0; 113.8; 83.8	12				
