= FIS Nordic World Ski Championships 2013 – Mixed team normal hill =

Mixed team normal hill at the FIS Nordic World Ski Championships 2013
- Date: 24 February 2013
- Competitors: 40 from 10 nations
- Winning points: 1011.0

Medalists
gold medal	Yuki Ito; Daiki Ito; Sara Takanashi; Taku Takeuchi	Japan
silver medal	Chiara Hölzl; Thomas Morgenstern; Jacqueline Seifriedsberger; Gregor Schlierenzauer	Austria
bronze medal	Ulrike Gräßler; Richard Freitag; Carina Vogt; Severin Freund	Germany

The mixed team normal hill took place on 24 February 2013.

== Results ==
The final was held at 17:00.

Rank	Bib	Country	Round 1 Distance (m)	Round 1 Points	Round 1 Rank	Final Round Distance (m)	Final Round Points	Final Round Rank	Total Points
1st place, gold medalist(s)	6	Japan; Yuki Ito; Daiki Ito; Sara Takanashi; Taku Takeuchi	90.0; 100.0; 101.5; 100.5	500.4; 108.1; 127.8; 132.0; 132.5	1	91.5; 100.0; 106.5; 101.5	510.6; 110.1; 131.3; 135.5; 137.	1	1011.0; 218.2; 259.1; 267.5; 266.2
2nd place, silver medalist(s)	10	Austria; Chiara Hölzl; Thomas Morgenstern; Jacqueline Seifriedsberger; Gregor Schlierenzauer	92.5; 99.5; 97.5; 99.0	484.5; 109.4; 126.0; 123.6; 125.2	3	98.5; 100.0; 99.5; 100.0	502.2; 121.3; 130.1; 121.7; 129.1	2	986.7; 230.7; 256.1; 245.3; 254.6
3rd place, bronze medalist(s)	7	Germany; Ulrike Gräßler; Richard Freitag; Carina Vogt; Severin Freund	96.5; 102.5; 95.5; 96.5	492.1; 117.7; 132.5; 119.7; 122.2	2	97.0; 97.0; 98.0; 99.5	492.8; 119.2; 123.8; 121.1; 128.7	3	984.9; 236.9; 256.3; 240.8; 250.9
4	9	Norway; Maren Lundby; Tom Hilde; Anette Sagen; Anders Bardal	91.0; 102.0; 92.5; 100.5	481.2; 109.9; 130.7; 109.0; 131.6	4	93.0; 98.5; 96.5; 101.0	488.1; 111.8; 126.0; 117.3; 133.0	4	969.3; 221.7; 256.7; 226.3; 264.6
5	2	France; Lea Lemare; Ronan Lamy Chappuis; Coline Mattel; Vincent Descombes Sevoie	93.5; 91.0; 93.5; 99.0	465.9; 113.8; 111.7; 113.6; 126.8	6	94.0; 94.0; 95.0; 100.0	475.3; 117.0; 114.4; 118.6; 125.3	5	941.2; 230.8; 226.1; 232.2; 252.1
6	5	United States; Jessica Jerome; Peter Frenette; Sarah Hendrickson; Anders Johnson	98.0; 89.5; 99.0; 90.0	466.2; 124.9; 103.7; 130.7; 106.9	5	98.5; 86.5; 104.5; 91.5	472.2; 125.3; 99.2; 138.8; 108.9	7	938.4; 250.2; 202.9; 269.5; 215.8
7	3	Italy; Elena Runggaldier; Andrea Morassi; Evelyn Insam; Sebastian Colloredo	90.8; 92.0; 89.5; 95.0	450.1; 116.5; 111.6; 106.2; 115.8	8	98.5; 92.5; 93.5; 97.5	473.0; 125.9; 112.3; 112.3; 122.5	6	923.1; 242.4; 223.9; 218.5; 238.3
8	8	Slovenia; Urša Bogataj; Jaka Hvala; Špela Rogelj; Peter Prevc	95.5; 95.5; 88.5; 96.0	453.0; 114.1; 114.9; 103.6; 120.4	7	97.5; 92.0; 93.5; 98.0	461.4; 120.0; 110.8; 112.1; 121.5	8	914.4; 234.1; 225.7; 215.7; 241.9
9	1	Russia; Anastasiya Gladysheva; Denis Kornilov; Irina Avvakumova; Dimitry Vassiliev	88.5; 95.0; 89.5; 91.0	427.7; 101.0; 117.6; 103.6; 105.5	9				
10	4	Czech Republic; Michaela Doleželová; Jakub Janda; Vladěna Pustková; Jan Matura	87.5; 94.5; 77.5; 97.5	417.1; 100.6; 116.8; 76.2; 123.5	10				
