= Volodymyr Veredyuk =

Ukrainian ski jumper (born 1993)

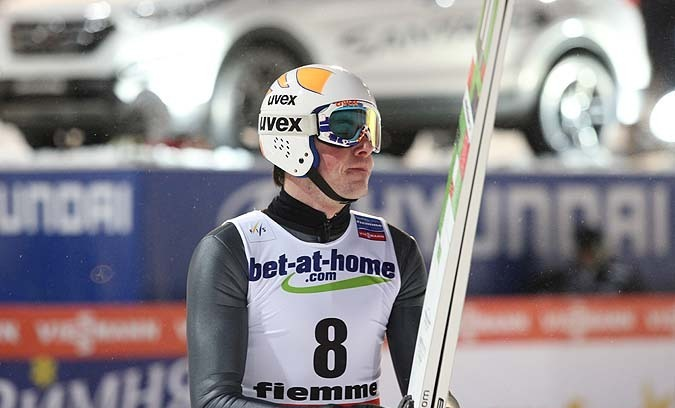

Personal information
- Full name: Volodymyr Veredyuk
- Born: 7 April 1993 (age 33) Vorokhta, Ukraine

Sport
- Sport: Skiing
- Updated on February 24, 2013

Volodymyr Veredyuk (born April 7, 1993) is a Ukrainian ski jumper.

== Performances ==
Level	Year	Event	NH	LH	T	MT
NJWSC	2006	Kranj, Slovenia	65			
NJWSC	2007	Tarvisio, Italy	56		13	
NJWSC	2008	Zakopane, Poland	61			
NJWSC	2009	Strbske Pleso, Slovakia	68		16	
NJWSC	2010	Hinterzarten, Germany	62		15	
NJWSC	2011	Otepää, Estonia	58			
NJWSC	2013	Liberec, Czech Republic	43			
NWSC	2013	Val di Fiemme, Italy	56	61		
