= Andreas Wank =

German ski jumper

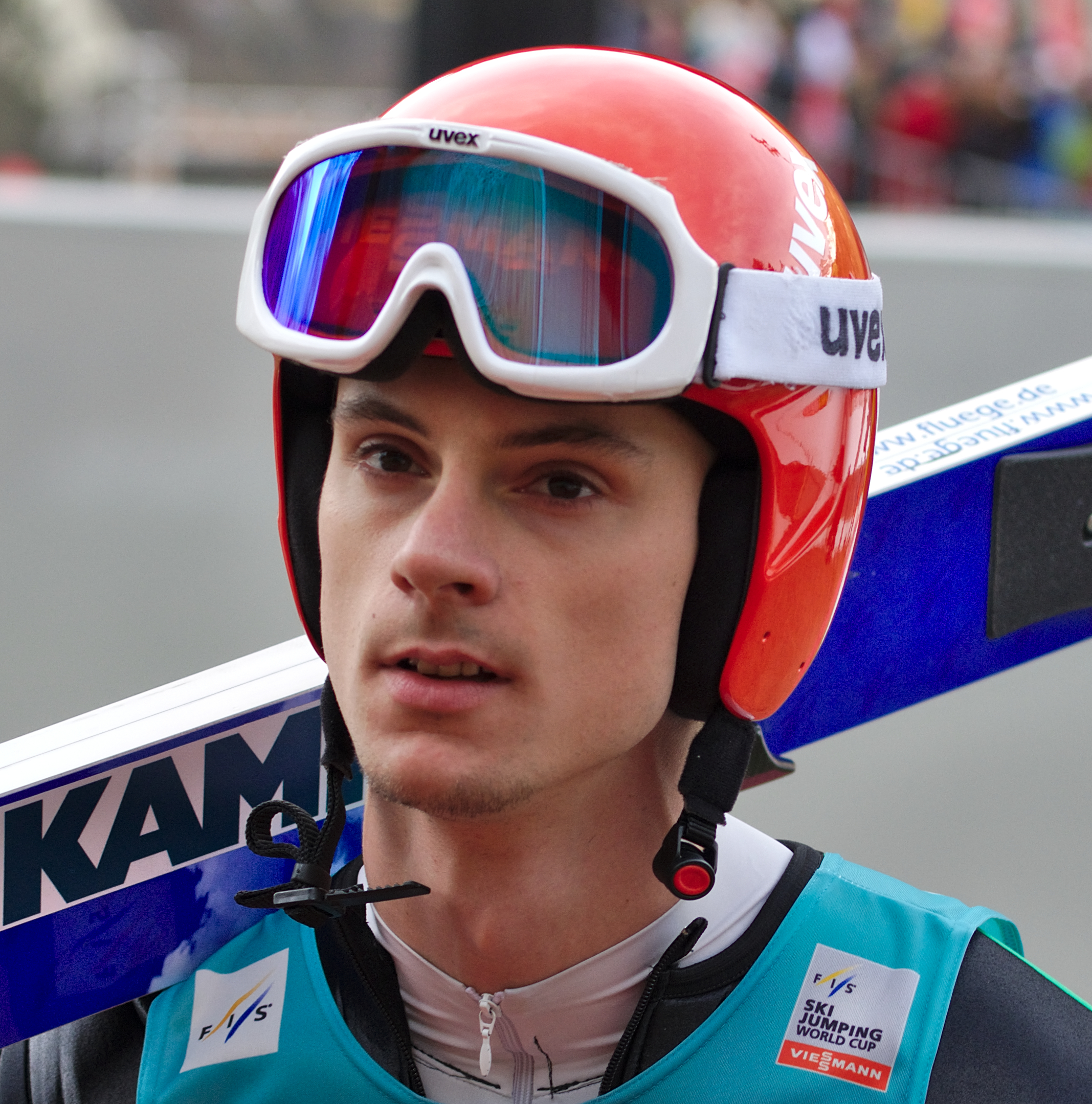
- Wank in 2014

Personal information
- Nationality: Germany
- Born: 18 February 1988 (age 38) Halle, East Germany
- Height: 1.90 m (6 ft 3 in)

Sport
- Sport: Skiing

World Cup career
- Seasons: 2005–2018
- Indiv. starts: 189
- Indiv. podiums: 2

Achievements and titles
- Personal bests: 219.5 m (720 ft); Planica, 22 March 2018
Medal record
Representing Germany
Men's ski jumping
Olympic Games
| Gold medal – first place | 2014 Sochi | Team LH |
| Silver medal – second place | 2010 Vancouver | Team LH |
World Championships
| Silver medal – second place | 2013 Val di Fiemme | Team LH |
Men's ski flying
World Championships
| Silver medal – second place | 2016 Bad Mitterndorf | Team |
- Updated on 12 April 2022

Andreas Wank (German pronunciation: [anˈdʁeːas ˈvaːŋk]; born 18 February 1988) is a German former ski jumper who competed at World Cup level from 2004 to 2019. He currently works in a supporting role as part of the German national ski jumping team.

== Early career ==
Wank began early on with ski jumping. At only 12 years old, he won the 2000 German schools championship (Deutsche Schülermeisterschaft). In 2001, he reached 3rd place in the Schülercup in the overall standings. He also earned 3rd place in the overall standings of the Germany Cup. In 2002, he was on the team for the German Championships. He won the silver medal in the team competition. A year later he started again in junior ranking and became German Vice-Junior Champion. In addition, he again reached 3rd Place in the overall standings of the Germany Cup.

== Later career ==
From 2004, Wank started in the Continental Cup and achieved in his second jump in Rovaniemi, with his first podium place 3. Then Wank was in the National Group for World Cup jumping in Oberstdorf in the Four Hills Tournament 2004–05. In his first jump in the highest ski-series, he reached 45th Place. In 2005, he made German Junior Champion in singles and was also on the team. At the German Senior championships, he finished sixth overall. In 2007, his team won the gold medal at the German championships.

On 27 February 2008 he placed 1st in Poland's Zakopane in the junior world champion in singles, the biggest success of his career. Two days later, he also won the title in the team jumping. In the season 2008–2009 he first belonged to the A-national squad for the World Cup ski jumping. In the end, he reached the 59th Place in the World Cup overall standings.

On 19 July 2009 Wank won the individual competition of the German championship in ski jumping in Garmisch-Partenkirchen with complete surprise jumps of 135 meters and 139 meters in front of Michael Neumayer and Michael Uhrmann.

His previous best finish in an individual jump, which he reached in the summer Grand Prix on 3 October 2009 in Klingenthal, was the 7th place.

He announced he was retiring from Ski Jumping via his Instagram page. His final jump was on 27 July 2019.

== Personal life ==
Wank is originally from Domnitz in Saxony-Anhalt. Since the age of ten he has lived in Oberhof, where he graduated from a sports school in 2007. In March 2008, he enrolled at the university of Ansbach to study international management in a program that has been adapted to the HS Anspach and designed specifically for top athletes.
