= Anders Johnson (ski jumper) =

American ski jumper

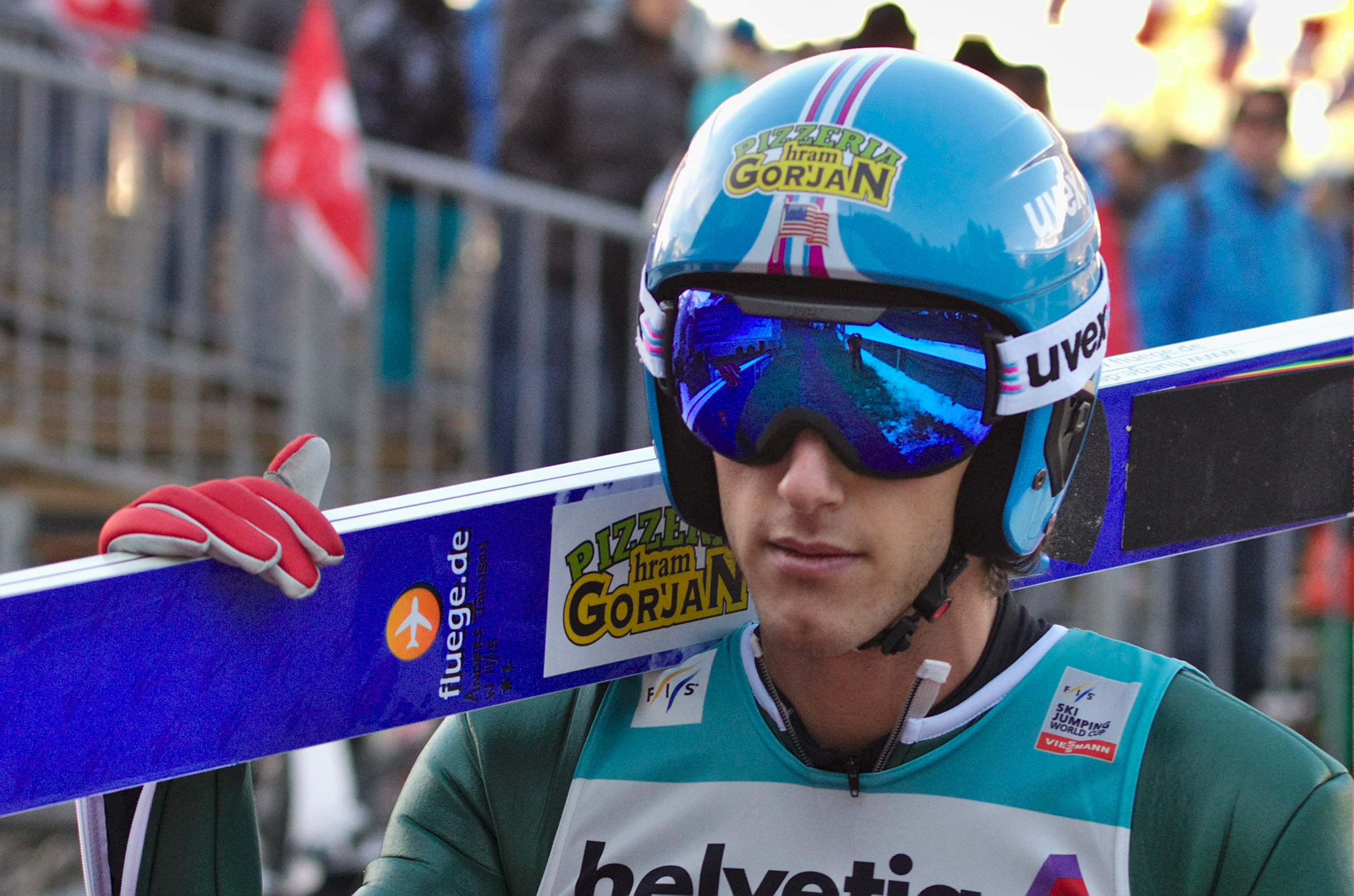

Personal information
- Born: April 23, 1989 (age 37) Plattsburgh, New York, U.S.
- Height: 6 ft 2 in (188 cm)

Sport
- Country: United States
- Sport: Ski jumping

Anders Johnson (born April 23, 1989) is an American ski jumper who has competed since 2002. Competing in two Winter Olympics, he earned his best finish of 11th in the team large hill at Vancouver in 2010. Johnson also finished 49th in the individual normal hill at those same games.

He finished 40th in the individual large hill event and 48th in the individual normal hill event at the FIS Nordic World Ski Championships 2009 in Liberec.

Johnson's best World Cup finish was 29th in the individual large hill event at Whistler Olympic Park in January 2009.

He attended The Winter Sports School in Park City, graduating in 2006.
