= Ville Larinto =

Finnish ski jumper (born 1990)

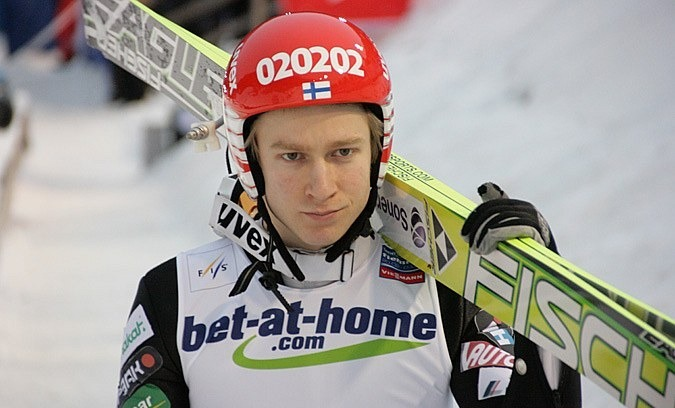

Personal information
- Nationality: Finland
- Born: 11 April 1990 (age 36) Lahti, Finland
- Height: 1.74 m (5 ft 8 1/2 in)

Sport
- Sport: Skiing
- Club: Lahden Hiihtoseura

World Cup career
- Seasons: 2008–2018
- Indiv. starts: 95
- Indiv. podiums: 5
- Indiv. wins: 1
- Team starts: 22
- Team podiums: 4
- Team wins: 1

Achievements and titles
- Personal bests: 209 m (686 ft); Kulm, 9 January 2009
- Updated on 25 May 2018

Ville Andreas Larinto (born 11 April 1990) is a Finnish former ski jumper.

== Career ==
Larinto made his World Cup debut in 2007/08, and picked up his first World Cup points in the Four Hills opener at Oberstdorf, Germany on 30 December 2007, when he finished 29th.

The 2008/09 season was his breakthrough season. He began the season with an impressive 9th-place finish at Kuusamo, and got his first career podium finish one week later in Trondheim, Norway, where he finished second behind Gregor Schlierenzauer.

Larinto claimed his first World Cup victory on 1 December 2010 at Kuopio.

== World Cup ==
=== Standings ===
Season	Overall	4H	SF	RA	W5	NT
2007/08	82	55	N/A	N/A	N/A	—
2008/09	14	14	17	N/A	N/A	22
2009/10	67	49	—	N/A	N/A	—
2010/11	20	49	—	N/A	N/A	N/A
2011/12	—	—	—	N/A	N/A	N/A
2012/13	73	—	—	N/A	N/A	N/A
2013/14	65	—	—	N/A	N/A	N/A
2014/15	53	—	—	N/A	N/A	N/A
2015/16	60	45	—	N/A	N/A	N/A
2016/17	56	—	—	47	N/A	N/A
2017/18	—	—	—	—	—	N/A

=== Wins ===
No.	Season	Date	Location	Hill	Size
1	2010/11	1 December 2010	(Finland) Kuopio	Puijo HS127 (night)	LH
