= Vincent Descombes Sevoie =

French former ski jumper (born 1984)

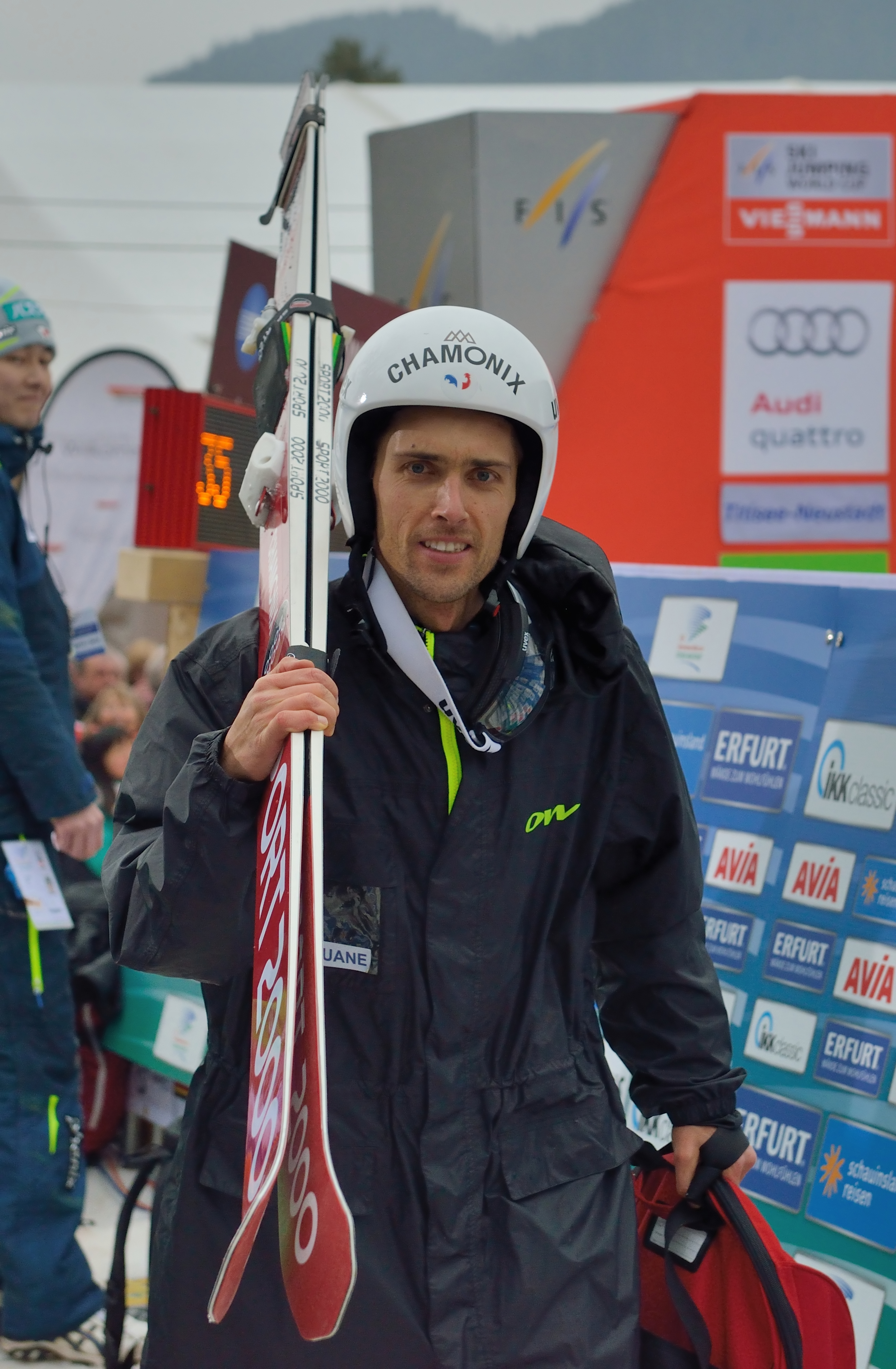

Personal information
- Nationality: France
- Born: 9 January 1984 (age 42) Chamonix, France

Sport
- Sport: Skiing
- Club: Douanes les Houches

World Cup career
- Seasons: 2006–2018
- Indiv. starts: 188
- Team starts: 16

Achievements and titles
- Personal bests: 230.5 m (756 ft); Vikersund, 14 February 2016
- Updated on 2 June 2018

Vincent Descombes Sevoie (born 9 January 1984) is a French former ski jumper.

== Career ==
At the 2010 Winter Olympics in Vancouver, he finished ninth in the team large hill, 21st in the individual large hill, and 28th in the individual normal hill events. Sevoie's best finish at the FIS Nordic World Ski Championships was eighth in the team large hill event at Liberec in 2009. His best World Cup finish is fifth place in the individual large hill event at Ruka in November 2016. He is also a French national record holder.

== World Cup ==
=== Standings ===
Season	Overall	4H	SF	RA	W5	P7	NT
2005/06	—	—	N/A	N/A	N/A	N/A	67
2006/07	60	39	N/A	N/A	N/A	N/A	44
2007/08	58	65	N/A	N/A	N/A	N/A	42
2008/09	39	37	37	N/A	N/A	N/A	51
2009/10	47	—	42	N/A	N/A	N/A	25
2010/11	—	64	—	N/A	N/A	N/A	N/A
2011/12	54	—	40	N/A	N/A	N/A	N/A
2012/13	42	—	26	N/A	N/A	N/A	N/A
2013/14	68	—	—	N/A	N/A	N/A	N/A
2014/15	28	44	26	N/A	N/A	N/A	N/A
2015/16	28	16	24	N/A	N/A	N/A	N/A
2016/17	16	13	30	29	N/A	N/A	N/A
2017/18	67	58	—	—	—	—	N/A

=== Individual starts (188) ===
Season	1	2	3	4	5	6	7	8	9	10	11	12	13	14	15	16	17	18	19	20	21	22	23	24	25	26	27	28	29	30	31	Points
2005/06	Kuusamo	Kuusamo	Lillehammer	Lillehammer	Harrachov	Harrachov	Engelberg	Oberstdorf	Garmisch-Partenkirchen	Innsbruck	Bischofshofen	Sapporo	Sapporo	Zakopane	Zakopane	Willingen	Lahti	Kuopio	Lillehammer	Oslo	Planica	Planica										0
2005/06	–	–	–	–	–	–	–	–	q	q	q	–	–	q	q	–	–	–	47	q	q	–										0
2006/07	Kuusamo	Lillehammer	Lillehammer	Engelberg	Engelberg	Oberstdorf	Garmisch-Partenkirchen	Innsbruck	Bischofshofen	Vikersund	Zakopane	Oberstdorf	Oberstdorf	Titisee-Neustadt	Titisee-Neustadt	Klingenthal	Willingen	Lahti	Kuopio	Oslo	Oslo	Planica	Planica	Planica								26
2006/07	67	24	22	37	21	42	36	43	48	–	q	35	q	–	–	–	–	39	46	43	48	q	q	–								26
2007/08	Kuusamo	Trondheim	Trondheim	Villach	Villach	Engelberg	Engelberg	Oberstdorf	Garmisch-Partenkirchen	Bischofshofen	Bischofshofen	Predazzo	Predazzo	Harrachov	Zakopane	Zakopane	Sapporo	Sapporo	Liberec	Liberec	Willingen	Kuopio	Kuopio	Lillehammer	Oslo	Planica	Planica					18
2007/08	33	31	40	41	30	39	50	37	q	q	q	q	26	–	46	44	27	32	38	49	q	35	23	q	q	q	–					18
2008/09	Kuusamo	Trondheim	Trondheim	Pragelato	Pragelato	Engelberg	Engelberg	Oberstdorf	Garmisch-Partenkirchen	Innsbruck	Bischofshofen	Tauplitz	Tauplitz	Zakopane	Zakopane	Whistler	Whistler	Sapporo	Willingen	Klingenthal	Oberstdorf	Lahti	Kuopio	Lillehammer	Vikersund	Planica	Planica					75
2008/09	23	34	41	21	23	17	41	24	34	37	49	25	23	35	19	33	37	–	46	53	29	39	q	43	q	q	–					75
2009/10	Kuusamo	Lillehammer	Lillehammer	Engelberg	Engelberg	Engelberg	Oberstdorf	Garmisch-Partenkirchen	Innsbruck	Bischofshofen	Bad Mitterndorf	Bad Mitterndorf	Sapporo	Sapporo	Zakopane	Zakopane	Oberstdorf	Klingenthal	Willingen	Lahti	Kuopio	Lillehammer	Oslo									59
2009/10	45	q	23	q	43	48	q	–	q	q	q	q	–	–	q	40	29	–	23	25	13	16	q									59
2010/11	Kuusamo	Kuopio	Lillehammer	Lillehammer	Engelberg	Engelberg	Engelberg	Oberstdorf	Garmisch-Partenkirchen	Innsbruck	Bischofshofen	Harrachov	Harrachov	Sapporo	Sapporo	Zakopane	Zakopane	Zakopane	Willingen	Klingenthal	Oberstdorf	Vikersund	Vikersund	Lahti	Planica	Planica						0
2010/11	q	q	q	46	50	46	49	–	–	q	50	q	q	–	–	q	49	46	q	q	–	–	–	–	q	–						0
2011/12	Kuusamo	Lillehammer	Lillehammer	Harrachov	Harrachov	Engelberg	Engelberg	Oberstdorf	Garmisch-Partenkirchen	Innsbruck	Bischofshofen	Bad Mitterndorf	Bad Mitterndorf	Zakopane	Zakopane	Sapporo	Sapporo	Predazzo	Predazzo	Willingen	Oberstdorf	Lahti	Trondheim	Oslo	Planica	Planica						39
2011/12	32	25	q	q	43	q	33	q	q	q	–	54	42	q	30	–	–	–	–	–	22	17	42	22	q	–						39
2012/13	Lillehammer	Lillehammer	Kuusamo	Krasnaja Polana	Krasnaja Polana	Engelberg	Engelberg	Oberstdorf	Garmisch-Partenkirchen	Innsbruck	Bischofshofen	Wisła	Zakopane	Sapporo	Sapporo	Vikersund	Vikersund	Harrachov	Harrachov	Klingenthal	Oberstdorf	Lahti	Kuopio	Trondheim	Oslo	Planica	Planica					85
2012/13	q	q	50	–	–	q	46	q	q	–	–	–	–	–	–	29	26	27	22	43	21	49	14	18	25	14	–					85
2013/14	Klingenthal	Kuusamo	Lillehammer	Lillehammer	Titisee-Neustadt	Titisee-Neustadt	Engelberg	Engelberg	Oberstdorf	Garmisch-Partenkirchen	Innsbruck	Bischofshofen	Tauplitz	Tauplitz	Wisła	Zakopane	Sapporo	Sapporo	Willingen	Willingen	Falun	Lahti	Lahti	Kuopio	Trondheim	Oslo	Planica	Planica				21
2013/14	34	q	17	45	q	27	39	39	q	q	q	q	q	q	38	q	q	47	–	–	–	–	–	q	34	28	35	q				21
2014/15	Klingenthal	Kuusamo	Kuusamo	Lillehammer	Lillehammer	Nizhny Tagil	Nizhny Tagil	Engelberg	Engelberg	Oberstdorf	Garmisch-Partenkirchen	Innsbruck	Bischofshofen	Tauplitz	Wisła	Zakopane	Sapporo	Sapporo	Willingen	Willingen	Titisee-Neustadt	Titisee-Neustadt	Vikersund	Vikersund	Lahti	Kuopio	Trondheim	Oslo	Oslo	Planica	Planica	179
2014/15	12	34	48	50	q	–	–	18	25	29	48	q	q	19	–	–	9	13	27	42	43	41	q	22	46	12	30	26	15	24	20	179
2015/16	Klingenthal	Lillehammer	Lillehammer	Nizhny Tagil	Nizhny Tagil	Engelberg	Engelberg	Oberstdorf	Garmisch-Partenkirchen	Innsbruck	Bischofshofen	Willingen	Zakopane	Sapporo	Sapporo	Oslo	Trondheim	Vikersund	Vikersund	Lahti	Lahti	Kuopio	Almaty	Almaty	Wisła	Titisee-Neustadt	Planica	Planica	Planica			204
2015/16	45	53	32	17	q	q	q	17	19	14	16	15	–	23	19	33	33	25	25	30	25	17	12	31	22	21	23	29	20			204
2016/17	Kuusamo	Kuusamo	Klingenthal	Lillehammer	Lillehammer	Engelberg	Engelberg	Oberstdorf	Garmisch-Partenkirchen	Innsbruck	Bischofshofen	Wisła	Wisła	Zakopane	Willingen	Oberstdorf	Oberstdorf	Sapporo	Sapporo	Pyeongchang	Pyeongchang	Oslo	Trondheim	Vikersund	Planica	Planica						386
2016/17	10	5	10	8	43	19	37	25	9	12	15	10	21	20	19	29	13	15	10	20	33	12	20	35	31	26						386
2017/18	Wisła	Kuusamo	Nizhny Tagil	Nizhny Tagil	Titisee-Neustadt	Engelberg	Engelberg	Oberstdorf	Garmisch-Partenkirchen	Innsbruck	Bischofshofen	Tauplitz	Zakopane	Willingen	Willingen	Lahti	Oslo	Lillehammer	Trondheim	Vikersund	Planica	Planica										4
2017/18	42	37	43	27	32	q	38	45	44	–	–	q	–	–	–	–	–	–	–	–	–	–										4
