= Peter Frenette =

American ski jumper

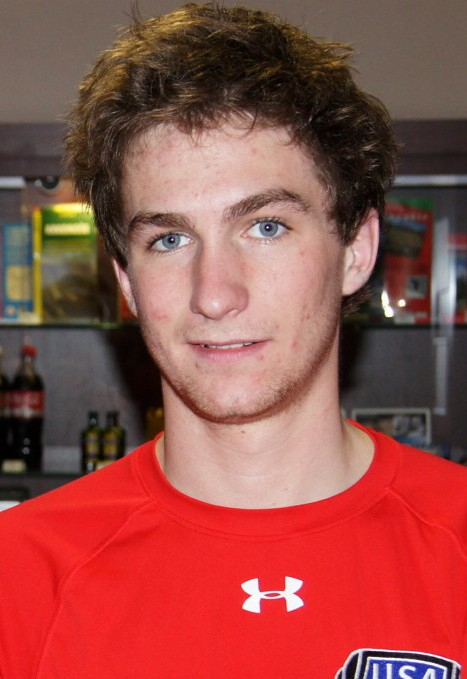

Peter Frenette (born February 24, 1992) is an American ski jumper who has competed since 2009. At the 2010 Winter Olympics in Vancouver, he finished 11th in the team large hill, 32nd in the individual large hill, and 41st in the individual normal hill events.

Though he has not competed in the World Cup, Frenette's best finish has been second in an HS 102 event in an FIS Cup event in Germany in January 2010.

Frenette grew up in Saranac Lake, NY in the upstate New York Adirondacks.
