= Taku Takeuchi =

Japanese ski jumper

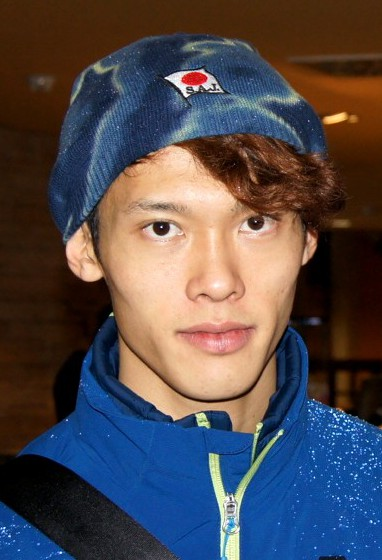

Personal information
- Born: 20 May 1987 (age 39) Iiyama, Nagano, Japan
- Height: 1.75 m (5 ft 9 in)

Sport
- Sport: Skiing
- Club: Kitano Construction Corp. Ski Club

World Cup career
- Seasons: 2006–present
- Indiv. podiums: 3 (+3 team)

Achievements and titles
- Personal bests: 240 m (790 ft); Vikersund, 13 February 2016
Medal record
Olympic Games
Bronze medal – third place	2014 Sochi	Team LH
World Championships
Gold medal – first place	2013 Val di Fiemme	Mixed team NH
Bronze medal – third place	2015 Falun	Mixed team NH
Bronze medal – third place	2017 Lahti	Mixed team NH

Taku Takeuchi (竹内 択, Takeuchi Taku; born 20 May 1987) is a Japanese ski jumper who has competed since 2006.

His best individual result was in 2013 when he finished 2nd at Klingenthal.

At the 2010 Winter Olympics in Vancouver, Takeuchi finished fifth in the team large hill, 34th in the individual normal hill, and 37th in the individual large hill events.
