= Ilya Rosliakov =

Russian ski jumper

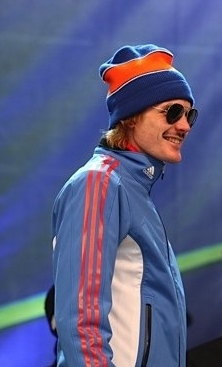

Ilya Sergeyevich Rosliakov (Russian: Илья Серге́евич Росляков) (born February 18, 1983, in Murmansk) is a Russian ski jumper who has been competing since 2003. At the 2010 Winter Olympics in Vancouver, he finished 10th in the team large hill and 44th in the individual large hill events.

Rosliakov's best finish at the FIS Nordic World Ski Championships was sixth in the team large hill event at Sapporo in 2007.

His best individual World Cup finish was 12th in an individual large hill in Austria in 2004.
