= Davide Bresadola =

Italian Nordic combined athlete

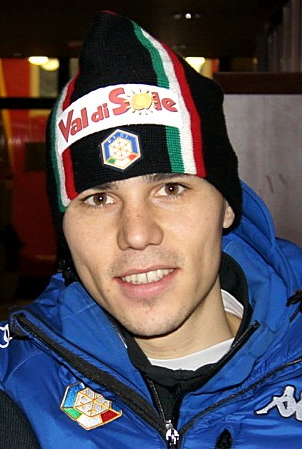

Personal information
- Born: 10 September 1988 (age 37) Cles, Trentino, Italy
- Height: 1.67 m (5 ft 6 in)

Sport
- Sport: Skiing

Davide Bresadola (born 10 September 1988) is an Italian Nordic combined athlete. He has competed in most of the World Cup events in his discipline since 2005.

In 2004, he finished second at the Italian championships of Nordic combined skiing. At the 2006 Winter Olympics at Turin, Bresadola placed 44th with a time of 21 minutes 43.3 seconds.
