= Denis Kornilov =

Russian ski jumper (born 1986)

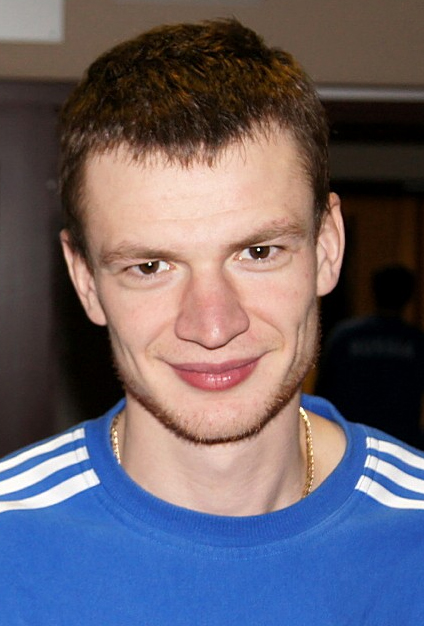
- Kornilov in 2011

Personal information
- Full name: Denis Aleksandrovich Kornilov
- Nationality: Russia
- Born: 17 August 1986 (age 39) Gorky, Russian SFSR, Soviet Union (now Nizhny Novgorod, Russia)

Sport
- Sport: Skiing
- Club: Sdushor Novgorod WWS

World Cup career
- Seasons: 2004–present
- Indiv. starts: 242
- Indiv. podiums: 3
- Team starts: 51
- Team podiums: 3

Achievements and titles
- Personal bests: 232 m (761 ft); Vikersund, 24 February 2012
- Updated on 2 April 2018

Denis Aleksandrovich Kornilov (Russian: Денис Александрович Корнилов; born 17 August 1986) is a Russian ski jumper who has competed at World Cup level since 2003.

== Career ==
Kornilov's best individual World Cup result is fifth in Bischofshofen on 6 January 2008, and in Sapporo on 3 February 2008. His best team result is second in Oberstdorf on 15 February 2009.

At the World Championships, his best individual result is 16th in 2011; his best team result is fifth in 2005. Kornilov has competed at four Winter Olympics, with his individual result being 24th and his best team result being seventh, both in 2018.
