= Sebastian Colloredo =

Italian ski jumper

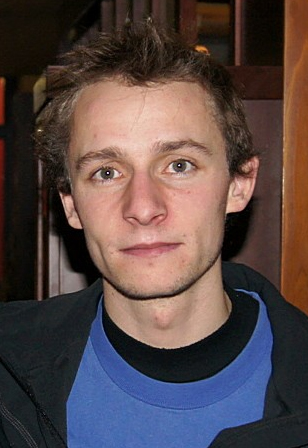
- Colloredo in 2011

Personal information
- Born: 9 September 1987 (age 38) Gemona del Friuli, Italy
- Height: 1.76 m (5 ft 9 in)

Sport
- Sport: Skiing
- Club: G.S. Fiamme Gialle

World Cup career
- Seasons: 2005–
- Indiv. podiums: 0
- Indiv. wins: 0

Achievements and titles
- Personal best: 210.5 m (Planica 2011)

Sebastian Colloredo (born 9 September 1987 in Gemona del Friuli), a.k.a. "Sebo" or "Collo", is an Italian ski jumper who has competed since 2002. Competing in four Winter Olympics, he earned his best finish of 11th in the team large hill events in 2006 and 2018 while his best individual finish was 27th twice (individual normal hill: 2006, individual large hill: 2010).

== Career ==
Colloredo's best individual finish was 10th in the individual large hill in Innsbruck in 2017.

Further notable results

- 2003: 3rd, Italian championships of ski jumping
- 2004: 1st, Italian championships of ski jumping
- 2005:
  - 1st, Italian championships of ski jumping
  - 1st, Italian championships of ski jumping, large hill
- 2006:
  - 1st, Italian championships of ski jumping
  - 2nd, Italian championships of ski jumping, large hill
- 2007:
  - 1st, Italian championships of ski jumping
  - Italian championships of ski jumping, large hill
- 2008:
  - 1st, Italian championships of ski jumping
  - Italian championships of ski jumping, large hill
- 2009:
  - 1st, Italian championships of ski jumping
  - Italian championships of ski jumping, large hill
- 2010:
  - 1st, Italian championships of ski jumping
  - Italian championships of ski jumping, large hill
- 2011:
  - 1st, Italian championships of ski jumping
  - Italian championships of ski jumping, large hill
