= Jan Matura =

Czech Olympic Nordic skier and ski jumper

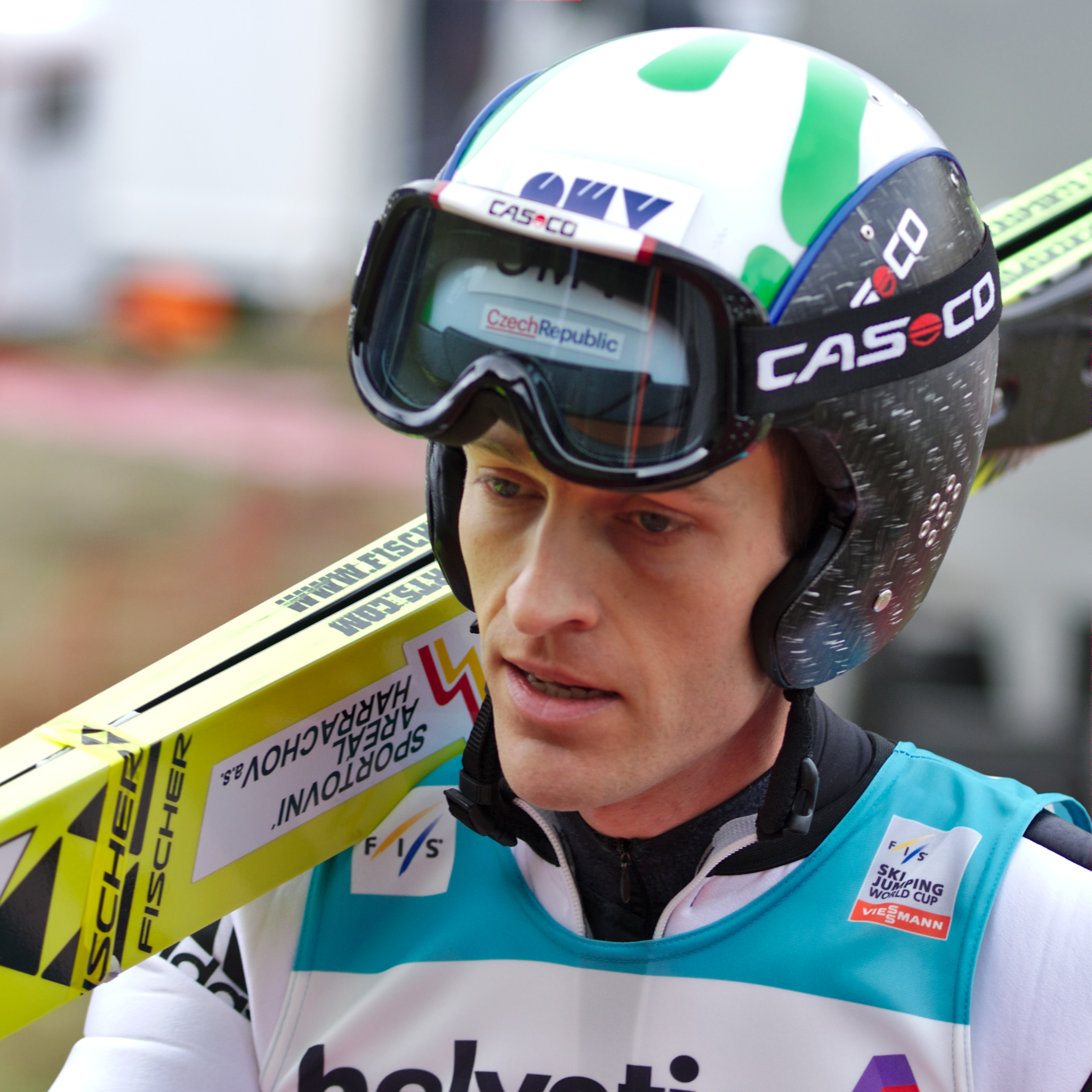

Personal information
- Nationality: Czech Republic
- Born: 29 January 1980 (age 46) Český Krumlov, Czechoslovakia
- Height: 1.75 m (5 ft 9 in)

Sport
- Sport: Skiing
- Club: Dukla Liberec

World Cup career
- Seasons: 1999–2001 (Nordic combined); 2002–2017 (ski jumping)
- Indiv. starts: 10 (Nordic combined); 265 (ski jumping)
- Indiv. podiums: 4 (ski jumping)
- Indiv. wins: 2 (ski jumping)
- Team starts: 44 (ski jumping)

Achievements and titles
- Personal bests: 224.5 m (737 ft); Vikersund, 26 January 2013
- Updated on 5 May 2017

Jan Matura (born 29 January 1980) is a Czech former Nordic skier competing from 1999 to 2001 and a former ski jumper competing from 2002 to 2017.

== Nordic combined ==
Matura finished eighth in the 4 × 5 km team event at the 1998 Winter Olympics in Nagano. His best results at the FIS Nordic World Ski Championships was 34th in the 15 km individual at Ramsau in 1999. At the World Cup level, Matura's best finish was ninth in a 15 km individual event in Germany in 1999. In Nordic combined, his overall best career finish was third twice in 7.5 km sprint events (1998, 2000).

== Ski jumping world cup ==
At the 2006 Winter Olympics in Turin, Matura finished ninth in the team large hill and 21st in the individual normal hill events.

His best FIS Nordic World Ski Championships occurred at Oberstdorf in 2005 where he finished seventh in the team normal hill and 23rd in both individual events. Matura's best finishes at the Ski-flying World Championships occurred at Kulm in 2006 where he finished eighth in the team and 28th in the individual events.

His best individual World Cup result is a double victory in Sapporo on 19 and 20 January 2013.

=== Standings ===
Season	Overall	4H	SF	RA	NT
2001/02	—	66	N/A	N/A	—
2002/03	72	65	N/A	N/A	43
2003/04	51	51	N/A	N/A	57
2004/05	44	43	N/A	N/A	43
2005/06	34	40	N/A	N/A	31
2006/07	57	54	N/A	N/A	—
2007/08	44	41	N/A	N/A	55
2008/09	66	—	51	N/A	—
2009/10	53	45	40	N/A	40
2010/11	27	42	25	N/A	N/A
2011/12	52	47	—	N/A	N/A
2012/13	10	19	6	N/A	N/A
2013/14	26	20	8	N/A	N/A
2014/15	40	28	34	N/A	N/A
2015/16	33	27	42	N/A	N/A
2016/17	—	63	—	53	N/A

=== Wins ===
No.	Season	Date	Location	Hill	Size
1	2012/13	19 January 2013	(Japan) Sapporo	Ōkurayama HS134 (night)	LH
2	2012/13	20 January 2013	(Japan) Sapporo	Ōkurayama HS134	LH
