= Andrea Morassi =

Italian ski jumper (born 1988)

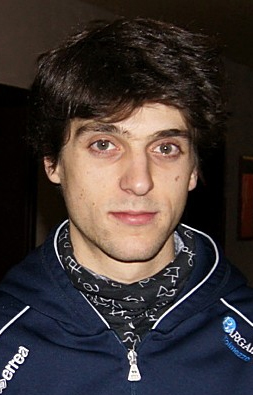

Personal information
- Full name: Andrea Morassi
- Born: 30 August 1988 (age 37) Tolmezzo, Italy

Sport
- Sport: Skiing
- Club: C.S. Forestale

World Cup career
- Seasons: 2005-
- Indiv. podiums: 1
- Indiv. wins: 0

Achievements and titles
- Personal best: 215.5 m (Planica 2011)

Andrea Morassi (born 30 August 1988) is an Italian ski jumper who has competed since 2003. Competing in two Winter Olympics, he had his best finish of 11th in the team large hill event at Turin in 2006 while earning his best individual finish of 36th in the individual normal hill event at those same games.

Morassi's best finish at the FIS Nordic World Ski Championships was 11th in the team large hill event at Liberec in FIS Nordic World Ski Championships 2009 while his best individual finish was 22nd in the individual large hill event at Sapporo two years earlier.

His best World Cup finish was third in an individual large hill event at Germany in 2007.

Further notable results

- 2004: 2nd, Italian championships of ski jumping
- 2005:
  - 2nd, Italian championships of ski jumping
  - 2nd, Italian championships of ski jumping, large hill
- 2006:
  - 1st, Italian championships of ski jumping, large hill
  - 2nd, Italian championships of ski jumping
- 2007:
  - 2nd, Italian championships of ski jumping
  - 2nd, Italian championships of ski jumping, large hill
- 2008: 3rd, Italian championships of ski jumping, large hill
- 2011:
  - 2nd, Italian championships of ski jumping
  - 2nd, Italian championships of ski jumping, large hill
