= 2025–26 FIS Ski Jumping Continental Cup =

Ski-jumping competition series

Winners
- Summer (Overall): (Poland) Kacper Tomasiak
- Summer (Nations Cup): Austria
- Winter (Overall): (Austria) Clemens Aigner
- Winter (Nations Cup): Austria

Competitions
- Venues: 3 (Summer), 11 (Winter)
- Individual: 6 (Summer), 23 (Winter)
- Cancelled: 1 men's (Winter)

The 2025–26 FIS Ski Jumping Continental Cup, organized by the International Ski Federation (FIS), is the upcoming 35th (33rd official) Continental Cup winter season and the 24th summer season for men as the second level of international ski jumping competitions.

Since 2023/24 women are competing in a newly created FIS Inter Continental Cup (2nd level equal to Continental Cup competition) merging FIS Continental Cup and FIS Cup.

Summer season on plastic mate (with total 6 individual events) started in Stams, Austria started on 13 September 2025 and concluded in Klingenthal, Germany on 19 October 2025.

Winter season with 24 individual events in total (11 different venues) started in Ruka, Finland on 13 December 2025 and concluded in Zakopane, Poland on 22 March 2026.

Clemens Aigner is the defending summer overall and Markus Müller winter overall champions.

== Map of Continental Cup hosts ==
The map contains all 14 (3 in summer and 11 in winter) Continental Cup hosts of the season.

(Finland) Ruka	(Switzerland) Engelberg	(Germany) Hinterzarten	(Poland) Zakopane	(Austria) Stams	(United States) Iron Mountain
Rukatunturi	Gross-Titlis	Adler Ski Stadium	Wielka Krokiew	Brunnentalschanze	Pine Mountain
(Japan) Sapporo	(Finland) Lahti	(Slovenia) Planica	(China) Zhangjiakou	(Austria) Eisenerz	(Germany) Klingenthal
Ōkurayama	Salpausselkä	Bloudkova velikanka	Snow Ruyi	Erzbergschanzen	Vogtland Arena
(Germany) Brotterode	(Norway) Lillehammer	(Slovenia) Kranj			
Inselbergschanze	Lysgårdsbakken	Bauhenk			
Europe
Germany		Austria United States		Asia	

== Men's Summer ==
Individual summer events in the CC history

Total	F	L	N	Winners
259	—	149	110

after large hill event in Klingenthal (19 October 2025)

=== Calendar ===
N – normal hill / L – large hill
All	No.	Date	Place (Hill)	Size	Winner	Second	Third	Overall	R.
254	1	13 September 2025	(Austria) Stams (Brunnentalschanze HS115)	L _{146}	(Austria) Clemens Aigner	(Austria) Francisco Mörth	(Austria) Julijan Smid	(Austria) Clemens Aigner	
255	2	14 September 2025	(Austria) Stams (Brunnentalschanze HS115)	L _{147}	(Poland) Kacper Tomasiak	(Austria) R. Zimmermann	(Austria) Jonas Schuster	(Austria) Clemens Aigner	
256	3	27 September 2025	(Germany) Hinterzarten (Adler Ski Stadium HS109)	N _{109}	(Japan) Tomofumi Naitō	(Poland) Kacper Tomasiak	(Germany) Constantin Schmid	(Poland) Kacper Tomasiak	
257	4	28 September 2025	(Germany) Hinterzarten (Adler Ski Stadium HS109)	N _{110}	(Poland) Kacper Tomasiak	(Austria) Jonas Schuster	(Switzerland) Gregor Deschwanden	(Poland) Kacper Tomasiak	
258	5	18 October 2025	(Germany) Klingenthal (Vogtland Arena HS140)	L _{148}	(Switzerland) Sandro Hauswirth	(Slovenia) Rok Oblak	(Germany) Felix Hoffmann	(Poland) Kacper Tomasiak	
259	6	19 October 2025	(Germany) Klingenthal (Vogtland Arena HS140)	L _{149}	(Switzerland) Gregor Deschwanden	(Germany) Felix Hoffmann	(Slovenia) Domen Prevc	(Poland) Kacper Tomasiak	
24th FIS Summer Continental Cup Overall (13 September – 19 October 2025)					(Poland) Kacper Tomasiak	(Austria) Jonas Schuster	(Austria) Clemens Aigner	Summer Overall	

==== Overall ====
Rank	after 6 events	Points
	(Poland) Kacper Tomasiak	362
2	(Austria) Jonas Schuster	312
3	(Austria) Clemens Aigner	228
4	(Switzerland) Gregor Deschwanden	226
5	(Japan) Tomofumi Naitō	203
6	(Germany) Felix Hoffmann	201
7	(Austria) Francisco Mörth	192
8	(Austria) Raffael Zimmermann	189
9	(Germany) Constantin Schmid	180
10	(Austria) Julijan Smid	167

==== Nations Cup ====
Rank	after 6 events	Points
	Austria	1426
2	Germany	650
3	Poland	521
4	Slovenia	447
5	Switzerland	437
6	Japan	313
7	Norway	208
8	Finland	185
9	Kazakhstan	53
10	United States	38

== Men's Winter ==
Individual winter events in the CC history

Total	F	L	N	Winners
1061	4	645	412

after large hill event in Zhangjiakou (14 January 2026)

=== Calendar ===
N – normal hill / L – large hill
All	No.	Date	Place (Hill)	Size	Winner	Second	Third	Overall	R.
1054	1	13 December 2025	(Finland) Ruka (Rukatunturi HS142)	L _{638}	(Norway) I. Andreas Langmo	(Austria) Maximilian Ortner	(Japan) Junshirō Kobayashi	(Norway) I. Andreas Langmo	
1055	2	14 December 2025	(Finland) Ruka (Rukatunturi HS142)	L _{639}	(Norway) Robin Pedersen	(Austria) Maximilian Ortner	(Norway) Sølve Jokerud Strand	(Austria) Maximilian Ortner	
1056	3	27 December 2025	(Switzerland) Engelberg (Gross-Titlis HS140)	L _{640}	(Austria) Clemens Leitner	(Austria) Markus Müller	(Poland) Dawid Kubacki	(Austria) Maximilian Ortner	
1057	4	28 December 2025	(Switzerland) Engelberg (Gross-Titlis HS140)	L _{641}	(Norway) Benjamin Østvold	(Austria) Markus Müller	(Japan) Yukiya Satō	(Austria) Markus Müller	
1058	5	10 January 2026	(Japan) Sapporo (Ōkurayama HS137)	L _{642}	(Japan) Keiichi Sato	(Norway) Robin Pedersen	(Austria) Niklas Bachlinger	(Norway) Robin Pedersen	
		11 January 2026	(Japan) Sapporo (Ōkurayama HS137)	L _{cnx}	cancelled due to strong wind			—'	
1059	6	11 January 2026	(Japan) Sapporo (Ōkurayama HS137)	L _{643}	(Austria) Clemens Aigner	(Norway) Jørgen Oliver Strøm	(Germany) Ben Bayer	(Austria) Clemens Aigner	
1060	7	13 January 2026	(China) Zhangjiakou (Snow Ruyi HS140)	L _{644}	(Germany) Luca Roth	(Germany) Ben Bayer	(Norway) Sølve Jokerud Strand	(Norway) Sølve Jokerud Strand	
1061	8	14 January 2026	(China) Zhangjiakou (Snow Ruyi HS140)	L _{645}	(Germany) Luca Roth	(Austria) Clemens Aigner	(Norway) Fredrik Villumstad	(Austria) Clemens Aigner	
1062	9	23 January 2026	(Austria) Eisenerz (Erzbergschanzen HS109)	N _{413}					
1063	10	24 January 2026	(Austria) Eisenerz (Erzbergschanzen HS109)	N _{414}					
1064	11	31 January 2026	(Norway) Lillehammer (Lysgardsbakken HS140)	L _{646}					
1065	12	1 February 2026	(Norway) Lillehammer (Lysgardsbakken HS140)	L _{647}					
1066	13	8 February 2025	(Slovenia) Kranj (Bauhenk HS109)	N _{415}					
1067	14	9 February 2025	(Slovenia) Kranj (Bauhenk HS109)	N _{416}					
1068	15	14 February 2026	(Germany) Brotterode (Inselbergschanze HS117)	L _{648}					
1069	16	15 February 2026	(Germany) Brotterode (Inselbergschanze HS117)	L _{649}					
1070	17	21 February 2026	(United States) Iron Mountain (Pine Mountain HS133)	L _{650}					
1071	18	21 February 2026	(United States) Iron Mountain (Pine Mountain HS133)	L _{651}					
1072	19	22 February 2026	(United States) Iron Mountain (Pine Mountain HS133)	L _{652}					
1073	20	14 March 2026	(Finland) Lahti (Salpausselkä HS130)	L _{653}					
1074	21	15 March 2026	(Finland) Lahti (Salpausselkä HS130)	L _{654}					
1075	22	21 March 2026	(Poland) Zakopane (Wielka Krokiew HS140)	L _{655}					
1076	23	22 March 2026	(Poland) Zakopane (Wielka Krokiew HS140)	L _{656}					
35th FIS Winter Continental Cup Overall (13 December 2025 – 22 March 2026)								Winter Overall	

==== Overall ====
Rank	after 8 of 23 events	Points
	(Austria) Clemens Aigner	397
2	(Norway) Sølve Jokerud Strand	358
3	(Norway) Robin Pedersen	323
4	(Norway) Frederik Villumstad	279
5	(Germany) Ben Bayer	236
6	(Austria) Clemens Leitner	235
7	(Germany) Luca Roth	223
8	(Norway) Jørgen Oliver Strøm	222
9	(Austria) Markus Müller	216
10	(Japan) Keiichi Sato	185

==== Nations Cup ====
Rank	after 8 of 23 events	Points
	Austria	1188
2	Norway	1074
3	Japan	584
4	Poland	405
5	Slovenia	394
6	Switzerland	284
7	Germany	170
8	Finland	93
9	France	62
10	United States	37

== Europa Cup vs. Continental Cup ==
- Last two Europa Cup seasons (1991/92 and 1992/93) are recognized as first two Continental Cup seasons by International Ski Federation (FIS), although Continental Cup under this name officially started first season in 1993/94 season.

== See also ==
- 2025–26 FIS Ski Jumping World Cup
- 2025 FIS Ski Jumping Grand Prix
- 2025–26 FIS Ski Jumping Inter-Continental Cup (women)
