= Ski jumping at the 2026 Winter Olympics – Men's large hill individual =

Men's large hill individual at the XXV Olympic Winter Games
- Ski jumping
- Venue: Predazzo Ski Jumping Stadium, Predazzo
- Date: 14 February 2026
- winning points: 301.8

Medalists
1st place, gold medalist(s)		Domen Prevc	Slovenia
2nd place, silver medalist(s)		Ren Nikaidō	Japan
3rd place, bronze medalist(s)		Kacper Tomasiak	Poland

The men's large hill individual competition of the 2026 Olympics was held on 14 February, at the Predazzo Ski Jumping Stadium in Predazzo. Domen Prevc won the event, winning thereby his first individual Olympic medal. Ren Nikaidō of Japan won the silver medal, and Kacper Tomasiak of Poland bronze.

== Background ==
All three 2022 medalists, Marius Lindvik, the champion, Ryōyū Kobayashi, the silver medalist, and Karl Geiger, the bronze medalist, kept competing and qualified for the Olympics. Before the Olympics, Domen Prevc was leading the 2025–26 FIS Ski Jumping World Cup ranking, having won 11 out of 20 events. He was also the 2025 World champion on the large hill.

== Schedule ==
=== Official training ===
GMT	Date	Event	Round	Country	Winner	Distance
20:00 PM	12 February 2026	Official training 1	R1	Austria	Jan Hörl	140.5 m (461 ft)
20:00 PM	12 February 2026	Official training 1	R2	Japan	Ren Nikaidō	139.0 m (456.0 ft)
20:00 PM	12 February 2026	Official training 1	R3	Slovenia	Domen Prevc	143.5 m (471 ft)
18:30 AM	13 February 2026	Official training 2	R1	Slovenia	Domen Prevc	138.5 m (454 ft)
18:30 AM	13 February 2026	Official training 2	R2	Japan	Ren Nikaidō	132.5 m (435 ft)
18:30 AM	13 February 2026	Official training 2	R3	Austria	Jan Hörl	132.0 m (433.1 ft)

=== Competition ===
GMT	Date	Event	Round	Country	Winner	Distance
17:30 AM	14 February 2026	Trial round	TR	Slovenia	Domen Prevc	132.0 m (433.1 ft)
18:45 AM	14 February 2026	1st round	1R	Japan	Ren Nikaidō	140.0 m (459.3 ft)
19:57 PM	14 February 2026	Final round	2R	Slovenia	Domen Prevc	141.5 m (464 ft)

== Results ==
=== Final ===
The final will be held on 14 February at 18:45.

Rank	Bib	Name	Country	Round 1			Final round			Total
Rank	Bib	Name	Country	Distance (m)	Points	Rank	Distance (m)	Points	Rank	Points
1st place, gold medalist(s)	50	Domen Prevc	Slovenia	138.5	147.0	2	141.5	154.8	1	301.8
2nd place, silver medalist(s)	48	Ren Nikaidō	Japan	140.0	154.0	1	136.5	141.0	9	295.0
3rd place, bronze medalist(s)	38	Kacper Tomasiak	Poland	133.0	141.8	4	138.5	149.4	3	291.2
4	40	Kristoffer Eriksen Sundal	Norway	136.0	145.0	3	135.5	143.0	7	288.0
5	44	Jan Hörl	Austria	134.5	141.7	5	136.0	145.2	4	286.9
6	49	Ryōyū Kobayashi	Japan	131.0	134.9	11	138.5	149.6	2	284.5
7	42	Stephan Embacher	Austria	133.0	139.0	7	136.0	145.1	5	284.1
8	20	Ilya Mizernykh	Kazakhstan	140.5	137.0	8	136.0	144.6	6	281.6
9	45	Philipp Raimund	Germany	131.0	135.2	10	136.0	142.2	8	277.4
10	39	Vladimir Zografski	Bulgaria	133.5	139.3	6	133.5	138.0	10	277.3
11	26	Antti Aalto	Finland	131.0	136.1	9	133.0	135.2	12	271.3
12	35	Johann André Forfang	Norway	128.5	133.2	13	132.5	137.9	11	271.1
13	31	Gregor Deschwanden	Switzerland	129.5	133.1	14	131.0	133.4	13	266.5
14	23	Paweł Wąsek	Poland	129.5	133.6	12	130.0	132.3	14	265.9
15	27	Andreas Wellinger	Germany	127.0	130.5	15	127.5	127.0	18	257.5
16	36	Naoki Nakamura	Japan	126.0	126.2	21	134.5	131.0	15	257.2
17	34	Valentin Foubert	France	127.0	130.3	16	129.0	126.6	19	256.9
18	28	Niko Kytösaho	Finland	127.0	127.6	18	136.5	129.2	16	256.8
19	13	Tate Frantz	United States	133.0	129.8	17	128.5	124.3	20	254.1
20	22	Kevin Bickner	United States	126.5	125.0	22	134.0	124.1	21	249.1
21	30	Kamil Stoch	Poland	126.5	127.1	19	131.5	121.2	23	248.3
21	15	Hektor Kapustík	Slovakia	131.5	121.2	30	132.0	127.1	17	248.3
23	9	Vilho Palosaari	Finland	131.0	124.1	23	130.5	121.7	22	245.8
24	32	Pius Paschke	Germany	125.0	122.6	27	127.0	116.6	24	239.2
25	43	Felix Hoffmann	Germany	126.0	122.8	24	126.5	114.7	25	237.5
26	25	Artti Aigro	Estonia	124.5	122.8	24	125.5	113.3	27	236.1
27	19	Danil Vassilyev	Kazakhstan	131.5	121.3	29	126.5	114.6	26	235.9
28	24	Sandro Hauswirth	Switzerland	127.0	126.9	20	124.0	107.8	29	234.7
29	16	Giovanni Bresadola	Italy	130.5	122.7	26	123.5	108.4	28	231.1
30	47	Anže Lanišek	Slovenia	124.5	122.2	28	118.5	92.1	30	214.3
31	29	Jason Colby	United States	123.5	119.8	31	Did not advance			
32	37	Marius Lindvik	Norway	123.0	119.3	32	Did not advance			
33	8	Jules Chervet	France	128.5	119.1	33	Did not advance			
34	33	Timi Zajc	Slovenia	123.0	116.9	34	Did not advance			
35	18	Alex Insam	Italy	128.0	115.8	35	Did not advance			
36	41	Stefan Kraft	Austria	121.5	115.3	36	Did not advance			
37	7	Fatih Arda İpcioğlu	Turkey	127.5	115.0	37	Did not advance			
38	17	Felix Trunz	Switzerland	127.0	114.2	38	Did not advance			
39	2	Song Qiwu	China	127.5	113.1	39	Did not advance			
40	5	Kaimar Vagul	Estonia	125.0	112.4	40	Did not advance			
41	14	Yevhen Marusiak	Ukraine	124.5	108.6	41	Did not advance			
42	21	Roman Koudelka	Czech Republic	119.0	107.7	42	Did not advance			
43	10	Enzo Milesi	France	122.5	107.6	43	Did not advance			
44	12	Vitaliy Kalinichenko	Ukraine	120.5	103.4	44	Did not advance			
45	11	Mackenzie Boyd-Clowes	Canada	119.5	101.8	45	Did not advance			
46	6	Daniel Cacina	Romania	117.0	95.4	46	Did not advance			
47	1	Francesco Cecon	Italy	115.0	86.8	47	Did not advance			
48	4	Muhammed Ali Bedir	Turkey	110.0	80.3	48	Did not advance			
49	3	Mihnea Spulber	Romania	99.5	60.6	49	Did not advance			
DSQ	46	Daniel Tschofenig	Austria	Disqualified (Note: Tschofenig was disqualified due to the improper size of his boots (they were too big).)						
Official results
