= Poland at the 2026 Winter Olympics =

- Flag of Poland
- IOC code: POL
- NOC: Polish Olympic Committee
- Website: www.olimpijski.pl (in Polish)

in Milan and Cortina d'Ampezzo, Italy 6 February 2026 – 22 February 2026
- Competitors: 59 (28 men and 31 women) in 12 sports
- Flag bearers (opening): Kamil Stoch & Natalia Czerwonka
- Flag bearers (closing): Vladimir Semirunniy & Gabriela Topolska
- Medals Ranked 21st: Gold 0 Silver 3 Bronze 1 Total 4

Winter Olympics appearances (overview)
- 1924; 1928; 1932; 1936; 1948; 1952; 1956; 1960; 1964; 1968; 1972; 1976; 1980; 1984; 1988; 1992; 1994; 1998; 2002; 2006; 2010; 2014; 2018; 2022; 2026

Poland competed at the 2026 Winter Olympics in Milan and Cortina d'Ampezzo, Italy, from 6 to 22 February 2026.

Vladimir Semirunniy and Gabriela Topolska were the country's flagbearer during the closing ceremony. Poland won the most medals since the 2014 Winter Olympics and achieved the third-highest medal result in history. The speed skating medal was Poland's first non-ski jumping medal since 2014.

== Competitors ==
The following is the list of number of competitors participating at the Games per sport/discipline.

| Sport | Men | Women | Total |
|---|---|---|---|
| Alpine skiing | 1 | 2 | 3 |
| Biathlon | 4 | 4 | 8 |
| Bobsleigh | 0 | 2 | 2 |
| Cross-country skiing | 3 | 4 | 7 |
| Figure skating | 3 | 3 | 6 |
| Luge | 3 | 3 | 6 |
| Nordic combined | 2 | —N/a | 2 |
| Short-track speed skating | 2 | 3 | 5 |
| Ski jumping | 3 | 2 | 5 |
| Ski mountaineering | 1 | 1 | 2 |
| Snowboarding | 2 | 2 | 4 |
| Speed skating | 4 | 5 | 9 |
| Total | 28 | 31 | 59 |

== Medalists ==
The following Polish competitors won medals at the games. In the discipline sections below, the medalists' names are bolded.

| Medal | Name | Sport | Event | Date |
|---|---|---|---|---|
| Silver | Kacper Tomasiak | Ski jumping | Men's normal hill individual | 9 February |
| Silver | Vladimir Semirunniy | Speed skating | Men's 10,000 metres | 13 February |
| Silver | Kacper Tomasiak; Paweł Wąsek | Ski jumping | Men's large hill super team | 16 February |
| Bronze | Kacper Tomasiak | Ski jumping | Men's large hill individual | 14 February |

Medals by date
| **Day** | **Date** | 1st place, gold medalist(s) | 2nd place, silver medalist(s) | 3rd place, bronze medalist(s) | **Total** |
| 3 | 9 February | 0 | 1 | 0 | **1** |
| 7 | 13 February | 0 | 1 | 0 | **1** |
| 8 | 14 February | 0 | 0 | 1 | **1** |
| 10 | 16 February | 0 | 1 | 0 | **1** |
| Total | | 0 | 3 | 1 | 4 |

Medals by sport
| Sport | 1st place, gold medalist(s) | 2nd place, silver medalist(s) | 3rd place, bronze medalist(s) | Total |
| Ski jumping | 0 | 2 | 1 | **3** |
| Speed skating | 0 | 1 | 0 | **1** |
| Total | 0 | 3 | 1 | 4 |

Medals by gender
| Gender | 1st place, gold medalist(s) | 2nd place, silver medalist(s) | 3rd place, bronze medalist(s) | Total |
| Male | 0 | 3 | 1 | **4** |
| Female | 0 | 0 | 0 | **0** |
| Mixed | 0 | 0 | 0 | **0** |
| Total | 0 | 3 | 1 | 4 |

Multiple medalists
| Name | Sport | 1st place, gold medalist(s) | 2nd place, silver medalist(s) | 3rd place, bronze medalist(s) | Total |
| Kacper Tomasiak | Ski jumping | 0 | 2 | 1 | **3** |

== Alpine skiing ==
Poland qualified one female and one male alpine skier through the basic quota and one more female based on the results during the qualifying period.

| Athlete | Event | Run 1 | | Run 2 | | Total | |
| Athlete | Event | Time | Rank | Time | Rank | Time | Rank |
|---|---|---|---|---|---|---|---|
| Michał Jasiczek | Men's slalom | DNF | | | | | |
| Maryna Gąsienica-Daniel | Women's giant slalom | 1:04.39 | 13 | 1:09.86 | 7 | 2:14.25 | 7 |
| Maryna Gąsienica-Daniel | Women's super-G | —N/a | | | | 1:26.07 | 18 |
| Aniela Sawicka | Women's slalom | 53.03 | 49 | DNF | | | |

== Biathlon ==
Poland qualified four female and four male biathletes through the 2024–25 Biathlon World Cup score.

Men

| Athlete | Event | Time | Misses | Rank |
|---|---|---|---|---|
| Konrad Badacz | Individual | 58:19.7 | 4 (2+1+1+0) | 49 |
| Konrad Badacz | Sprint | 25:53.3 | 3 (3+0) | 57 |
| Konrad Badacz | Pursuit | 35:52.6 | 1 (0+0+1+0) | 43 |
| Grzegorz Galica | Individual | 57:10.2 | 3 (1+0+2+0) | 33 |
| Grzegorz Galica | Sprint | 25:10.8 | 2 (0+2) | 37 |
| Grzegorz Galica | Pursuit | 35:40.8 | 5 (2+0+1+2) | 40 |
| Jan Guńka | Individual | 59:25.2 | 4 (1+0+2+1) | 61 |
| Jan Guńka | Sprint | 24:50.5 | 1 (1+0) | 29 |
| Jan Guńka | Pursuit | 34:59.5 | 3 (0+0+2+1) | 32 |
| Marcin Zawół | Individual | 57:58.9 | 3 (0+1+1+1) | 43 |
| Marcin Zawół | Sprint | 26:15.4 | 4 (3+1) | 69 |
| Konrad Badacz; Grzegorz Galica; Jan Guńka; Marcin Zawół | Team relay | 1:23:32.5 | 0 (0+10) | 11 |

Women

| Athlete | Event | Time | Misses | Rank |
|---|---|---|---|---|
| Joanna Jakieła | Individual | 47:52.1 | 5 (1+2+0+2) | 66 |
| Joanna Jakieła | Sprint | 22:21.0 | 2 (0+2) | 28 |
| Joanna Jakieła | Pursuit | 32:28.5 | 3 (2+0+0+1) | 16 |
| Joanna Jakieła | Mass start | 38:22.9 | 2 (0+1+0+1) | 11 |
| Anna Mąka | Individual | 46:08.6 | 3 (1+1+1+0) | 45 |
| Anna Mąka | Sprint | 22:55.2 | 2 (0+2) | 45 |
| Anna Mąka | Pursuit | 34:03.3 | 3 (0+0+2+1) | 40 |
| Natalia Sidorowicz | Individual | 44:22.0 | 2 (0+1+0+1) | 23 |
| Natalia Sidorowicz | Sprint | 22:50.8 | 2 (0+2) | 41 |
| Natalia Sidorowicz | Pursuit | 31:56.8 | 0 (0+0+0+0) | 13 |
| Natalia Sidorowicz | Mass start | 38:44.0 | 2 (1+0+1+0) | 15 |
| Kamila Żuk | Individual | 45:39.3 | 4 (3+1+0+0) | 43 |
| Kamila Żuk | Sprint | 21:50.1 | 1 (1+0) | 8 |
| Kamila Żuk | Pursuit | 31:53.6 | 3 (1+1+1+0) | 12 |
| Kamila Żuk | Mass start | 43:27.5 | 10 (2+3+3+2) | 30 |
| Joanna Jakieła; Anna Mąka; Natalia Sidorowicz; Kamila Żuk | Team relay | 1:12:37.5 | 0 (0+12) | 6 |

Mixed

| Athlete | Event | Time | Misses | Rank |
|---|---|---|---|---|
| Konrad Badacz; Jan Guńka; Natalia Sidorowicz; Kamila Żuk | Mixed relay | 1:07:12.4 | 14 (1+13) | 9 |

== Bobsleigh ==
Based on their rankings in the 2025–26 Bobsleigh World Cup, Poland qualified 2 sleds.

Women

| Athlete | Event | Run 1 | | Run 2 | | Run 3 | | Run 4 | | Total | |
| Athlete | Event | Time | Rank | Time | Rank | Time | Rank | Time | Rank | Time | Rank |
|---|---|---|---|---|---|---|---|---|---|---|---|
| Linda Weiszewski* | Monobob | 1:00.77 | 20 | 1:00.66 | 17 | 1:00.11 | 13 | 1:00.00 | 15 | 4:01.54 | 17 |
| Linda Weiszewski*; Klaudia Adamek | Two-woman | 57.74 | 15 | 58.36 | 24 | 58.24 | 15 | 58.29 | 18 | 3:52.63 | 18 |

* – Denotes the driver of each sled

== Cross-country skiing ==
Poland qualified one female and one male cross-country skier through the basic quota. Following the completion of the 2024–25 FIS Cross-Country World Cup, Poland qualified further a three female and two male athletes.

Men

| Athlete | Event | Classical | | Freestyle | | Final | | |
| Athlete | Event | Time | Rank | Time | Rank | Time | Deficit | Rank |
|---|---|---|---|---|---|---|---|---|
| Sebastian Bryja | 10 km freestyle | —N/a | | | | 23:14.6 | +2:38.4 | 56 |
| Sebastian Bryja | 20 km skiathlon | 25:49.6 | 48 | 24:45.1 | 48 | 51:05.6 | +4:54.6 | 47 |
| Dominik Bury | 10 km freestyle | —N/a | | | | 22:14.7 | +1:38.5 | 31 |
| Dominik Bury | 20 km skiathlon | 25:14.0 | 40 | 23:23.8 | 22 | 49:05.7 | +2:54.7 | 32 |
| Dominik Bury | 50 km classical | —N/a | | | | 2:13:39.7 | +6:32.6 | 12 |
| Maciej Staręga | 10 km freestyle | —N/a | | | | 25:07.1 | +4:30.9 | 81 |

Women

| Athlete | Event | Classical | | Freestyle | | Final | | |
| Athlete | Event | Time | Rank | Time | Rank | Time | Deficit | Rank |
|---|---|---|---|---|---|---|---|---|
| Aleksandra Kołodziej | 10 km freestyle | —N/a | | | | 25:57.0 | +3:07.8 | 44 |
| Izabela Marcisz | 10 km freestyle | —N/a | | | | 25:47.5 | +2:58.3 | 40 |
| Eliza Rucka-Michałek | 10 km freestyle | —N/a | | | | 25:06.8 | +2:17.6 | 27 |
| Eliza Rucka-Michałek | 20 km skiathlon | 29:52.4 | 32 | 28:12.4 | 21 | 58:35.5 | +4:50.3 | 29 |
| Eliza Rucka-Michałek | 50 km classical | —N/a | | | | 2:23:47.6 | +7:19.4 | 8 |
| Monika Skinder | 10 km freestyle | —N/a | | | | 26:32.3 | +3:43.1 | 60 |
| Monika Skinder | 20 km skiathlon | 30:46.5 | 44 | 29:46.8 | 40 | 1:01:06.2 | +7:21.3 | 41 |
| Aleksandra Kołodziej; Izabela Marcisz; Eliza Rucka-Michałek; Monika Skinder | 4×7.5 km relay | —N/a | | | | 1:21:21.6 | +5:36.8 | 12 |

Sprint

| Athlete | Event | Qualification | | Quarterfinal | | Semifinal | | Final | |
| Athlete | Event | Time | Rank | Time | Rank | Time | Rank | Time | Rank |
|---|---|---|---|---|---|---|---|---|---|
| Sebastian Bryja | Men's sprint | 3:26.83 | 53 | Did not advance | | | | | |
| Maciej Staręga | Men's sprint | 3:22.28 | 40 | Did not advance | | | | | |
| Dominik Bury; Maciej Staręga | Men's team sprint | 5:57.70 | 15 Q | —N/a | | | | 18:49.03 | 13 |
| Aleksandra Kołodziej | Women's sprint | 3:54.37 | 42 | Did not advance | | | | | |
| Izabela Marcisz | Women's sprint | 3:51.73 | 37 | Did not advance | | | | | |
| Monika Skinder | Women's sprint | 3:51.10 | 33 | Did not advance | | | | | |
| Izabela Marcisz; Monika Skinder | Women's team sprint | 6:58.52 | 11 Q | —N/a | | | | 21:31.80 | 11 |

== Figure skating ==
In the 2025 World Figure Skating Championships in Boston, the United States, Poland secured one quota in each of the men's and women's singles, the pair skating. Furthermore, Poland qualified to the team event.

| Athlete | Event | SP/SD | | FP/FD | | Total | |
| Athlete | Event | Points | Rank | Points | Rank | Points | Rank |
|---|---|---|---|---|---|---|---|
| Vladimir Samoilov | Men's singles | 77.57 | 21 Q | 144.68 | 17 | 222.25 | 21 |
| Ekaterina Kurakova | Women's singles | 60.14 | 19 Q | 113.23 | 21 | 173.37 | 20 |
| Ioulia Chtchetinina; Michał Woźniak | Pairs | 65.23 | 15 Q | 120.63 | 13 | 185.86 | 13 |

Team event

| Athlete | Event | Short program / Rhythm dance | | | | | | Free skate / Free dance | | | | Total | |
| Athlete | Event | Men's | Women's | Pairs | Ice dance | Total | | Men's | Women's | Pairs | Ice dance | Total | |
| Athlete | Event | Points Team points | Points Team points | Points Team points | Points Team points | Points | Rank | Points Team points | Points Team points | Points Team points | Points Team points | Points | Rank |
|---|---|---|---|---|---|---|---|---|---|---|---|---|---|
| Vladimir Samoilov (M); Ekaterina Kurakova (W); Ioulia Chtchetinina / Michał Woźniak (P); Sofiia Dovhal / Wiktor Kulesza (ID) | Team event | 80.47; 2 | 57.76; 2 | 60.20; 3 | 60.23; 1 | 8 | 10 | Did not advance | | | | | |

== Luge ==
Based on the results from the Olympic test event and the fall World Cups during the 2025–26 Luge World Cup season, Poland earned the following start quotas:

Men

| Athlete | Event | Run 1 | | Run 2 | | Run 3 | | Run 4 | | Total | |
| Athlete | Event | Time | Rank | Time | Rank | Time | Rank | Time | Rank | Time | Rank |
|---|---|---|---|---|---|---|---|---|---|---|---|
| Mateusz Sochowicz | Men's singles | 54.676 | 23 | 54.332 | 22 | 54.015 | 20 | Did not advance | | 2:43.023 | 21 |
| Wojciech Chmielewski; Michał Gancarczyk | Men's doubles | 53.000 | 11 | 53.246 | 13 | —N/a | | | | 1:46.246 | 13 |

Women

| Athlete | Event | Run 1 | | Run 2 | | Run 3 | | Run 4 | | Total | |
| Athlete | Event | Time | Rank | Time | Rank | Time | Rank | Time | Rank | Time | Rank |
|---|---|---|---|---|---|---|---|---|---|---|---|
| Klaudia Domaradzka | Women's singles | 54.663 | 23 | 54.310 | 20 | 54.365 | 24 | Did not advance | | 2:43.338 | 23 |
| Nikola Domowicz; Dominika Piwkowska | Women's doubles | 54.247 | 8 | 53.989 | 6 | —N/a | | | | 1:48.236 | 6 |

Mixed

| Athlete | Event | Women's singles | | Men's doubles | | Men's singles | | Women's doubles | | Total | |
| Athlete | Event | Time | Rank | Time | Rank | Time | Rank | Time | Rank | Time | Rank |
|---|---|---|---|---|---|---|---|---|---|---|---|
| Klaudia Domaradzka; Wojciech Chmielewski / Michał Gancarczyk; Mateusz Sochowicz; Nikola Domowicz / Dominika Piwkowska | Team relay | 57.174 | 9 | 55.832 | 6 | 57.208 | 9 | 57.120 | 6 | 3:47.334 | 8 |

== Nordic combined ==
Two athletes from Poland qualified.

| Athlete | Event | Ski jumping | | | Cross-country | | Total | |
| Athlete | Event | Distance | Points | Rank | Time | Rank | Time | Rank |
|---|---|---|---|---|---|---|---|---|
| Kacper Jarząbek | Normal hill/10 km | 78.5 | 82.7 | 36 | 36:03.7 | 33 | 39:23.7 | 33 |
| Kacper Jarząbek | Large hill/10 km | 102.0 | 76.2 | 36 | 29:02.0 | 33 | 33:57.0 | 35 |
| Miłosz Krzempek | Normal hill/10 km | 90.0 | 104.4 | 29 | 39:39.5 | 35 | 41:32.5 | 35 |
| Miłosz Krzempek | Large hill/10 km | 120.0 | 114.8 | 26 | 30:59.9 | 35 | 33:20.9 | 33 |
| Kacper Jarząbek; Miłosz Krzempek | Large hill/2 × 7.5 km | 205.5 | 154.2 | 13 | 47:29.4 | 13 | 49:32.4 | 13 |

== Short-track speed skating ==
Poland qualified four short-track speed skaters (two men and three women) after the conclusion of the 2025–26 ISU Short Track World Tour.

Men

| Athlete | Event | Heat | | Quarterfinal | | Semifinal | | Final | |
| Athlete | Event | Time | Rank | Time | Rank | Time | Rank | Time | Rank |
|---|---|---|---|---|---|---|---|---|---|
| Michał Niewiński | 500 m | 41.174 | 3 | Did not advance | | | | | 21 |
| Felix Pigeon | 500 m | 41.179 | 2 Q | 40.770 | 2 Q | 41.026 | 3 FB | 45.345 | 8 |
| Michał Niewiński | 1000 m | 1:25.135 | 1 Q | 1:46.369 | 3 ADV | 1:25.617 | 3 FB | 1:27.521 | 9 |
| Felix Pigeon | 1000 m | 1:26.271 | 4 | Did not advance | | | | | 27 |
| Michał Niewiński | 1500 m | —N/a | | 2:15.853 | 6 | Did not advance | | | 30 |
| Felix Pigeon | 1500 m | —N/a | | 2:18.687 | 3 Q | 2:40.503 | 5 | Did not advance | 18 |

Women

| Athlete | Event | Heat | | Quarterfinal | | Semifinal | | Final | |
| Athlete | Event | Time | Rank | Time | Rank | Time | Rank | Time | Rank |
|---|---|---|---|---|---|---|---|---|---|
| Natalia Maliszewska | 500 m | 43.313 | 2 Q | 58.994 | 5 | Did not advance | | | 17 |
| Gabriela Topolska | 500 m | 43.813 | 4 | Did not advance | | | | | 26 |
| Natalia Maliszewska | 1000 m | 1:31.282 | 3 | Did not advance | | | | | 22 |
| Kamila Sellier | 1000 m | 1:29.948 | 3 | Did not advance | | | | | 21 |
| Gabriela Topolska | 1000 m | 1:31.999 | 2 Q | 1:31.541 | 5 | Did not advance | | | 19 |
| Natalia Maliszewska | 1500 m | —N/a | | 2:34.131 | 4 | Did not advance | | | 24 |
| Kamila Sellier | 1500 m | —N/a | | PEN | | Did not advance | | | 33 |
| Gabriela Topolska | 1500 m | —N/a | | 3:02.875 | 6 | Did not advance | | | 30 |

Mixed

| Athlete | Event | Quarterfinal | | Semifinal | | Final | |
| Athlete | Event | Time | Rank | Time | Rank | Time | Rank |
|---|---|---|---|---|---|---|---|
| Natalia Maliszewska; Michał Niewiński; Felix Pigeon; Kamila Sellier | 2000 m relay | 2:40.955 | 3 | Did not advance | | | 9 |

Qualification legend: ADV – Advanced due to being impeded by another skater; FA – Qualify to medal round; FB – Qualify to consolation round

== Ski jumping ==
Three male and two female ski jumpers from Poland qualified.

Men

| Athlete | Event | First round | | | Second round | | | Final round | | | Total | |
| Athlete | Event | Distance | Points | Rank | Distance | Points | Rank | Distance | Points | Rank | Points | Rank |
|---|---|---|---|---|---|---|---|---|---|---|---|---|
| Kamil Stoch | Normal hill | 100.0 | 119.2 | 38 | —N/a | | | Did not advance | | | | |
| Kamil Stoch | Large hill | 126.5 | 127.1 | 19 | —N/a | | | 131.5 | 121.2 | 23 | 248.3 | 21 |
| Kacper Tomasiak | Normal hill | 103.0 | 132.8 | =4 Q | —N/a | | | 107.0 | 137.9 | 2 | 270.7 | 2nd place, silver medalist(s) |
| Kacper Tomasiak | Large hill | 133.0 | 141.8 | 4 | —N/a | | | 138.5 | 149.4 | 3 | 291.2 | 3rd place, bronze medalist(s) |
| Paweł Wąsek | Normal hill | 97.5 | 119.8 | 35 | —N/a | | | Did not advance | | | | |
| Paweł Wąsek | Large hill | 129.5 | 133.6 | 12 | —N/a | | | 130.0 | 132.3 | 14 | 265.9 | 14 |
| Kacper Tomasiak; Paweł Wąsek | Large hill super team | 269.0 | 274.5 | 3 | 265.0 | 272.8 | 2 | Cancelled | | | 547.3 | 2nd place, silver medalist(s) |

Women

| Athlete | Event | First round | | | Final round | | | Total | |
| Athlete | Event | Distance | Points | Rank | Distance | Points | Rank | Points | Rank |
|---|---|---|---|---|---|---|---|---|---|
| Pola Bełtowska | Normal hill | 78.0 | 73.7 | 50 | Did not advance | | | | |
| Pola Bełtowska | Large hill | 108.0 | 83.4 | 40 | Did not advance | | | | |
| Anna Twardosz | Normal hill | 96.0 | 124.0 | 8 Q | 93.5 | 116.5 | 13 | 240.5 | 10 |
| Anna Twardosz | Large hill | 115.0 | 93.1 | 35 | Did not advance | | | | |

Mixed

| Athlete | Event | First round | | | Final | | | Total | |
| Athlete | Event | Distance | Points | Rank | Distance | Points | Rank | Points | Rank |
|---|---|---|---|---|---|---|---|---|---|
| Pola Bełtowska; Kacper Tomasiak; Anna Twardosz; Paweł Wąsek | Team normal hill | 377.0 | 447.4 | 11 | Did not advance | | | | |

== Ski mountaineering ==
Poland qualified one female and one male ski mountaineer through the Olympic ranking lists.

| Athlete | Event | Heat | | Semifinal | | Final | |
| Athlete | Event | Time | Rank | Time | Rank | Time | Rank |
|---|---|---|---|---|---|---|---|
| Jan Elantkowski | Men's sprint | 3:01.99 | 5 | Did not advance | | | 15 |
| Iwona Januszyk | Women's sprint | 3:34.88 | 6 | Did not advance | | | 17 |
| Jan Elantkowski; Iwona Januszyk | Mixed relay | —N/a | | | | 29:38.43 | 9 |

== Snowboarding ==
According to the quota allocation list, Poland qualified four athletes.

Parallel

| Athlete | Event | Qualification | | Round of 16 | Quarterfinal | Semifinal | Final / BM | |
| Athlete | Event | Time | Rank | Opposition Time | Opposition Time | Opposition Time | Opposition Time | Rank |
|---|---|---|---|---|---|---|---|---|
| Oskar Kwiatkowski | Men's giant slalom | 1:28.70 | 28 | Did not advance | | | | |
| Michał Nowaczyk | Men's giant slalom | 1:28.08 | 23 | Did not advance | | | | |
| Maria Bukowska-Chyc | Women's giant slalom | 1:39.17 | 27 | Did not advance | | | | |
| Aleksandra Król-Walas | Women's giant slalom | 1:33.18 | 5 Q | Moisan (CAN); W -0.36 | Dalmasso (ITA); L +0.26 | Did not advance | | 7 |

== Speed skating ==
Poland qualified nine speed skaters (four men and five women) through performances at the 2025-26 ISU Speed Skating World Cup. Nine athletes were selected for the following events:

Men

| Athlete | Event | Final | |
| Athlete | Event | Time | Rank |
|---|---|---|---|
| Marek Kania | 500 m | 34.48 | 8 |
| Marek Kania | 1000 m | 1:09.58 | 23 |
| Piotr Michalski | 500 m | 35.10 | 24 |
| Piotr Michalski | 1000 m | 1:10.02 | 25 |
| Vladimir Semirunniy | 1500 m | 1:45.37 | 10 |
| Vladimir Semirunniy | 10,000 m | 12:39.08 | 2nd place, silver medalist(s) |
| Damian Żurek | 500 m | 34.35 | 4 |
| Damian Żurek | 1000 m | 1:07.41 | 4 |

Women

| Athlete | Event | Final | |
| Athlete | Event | Time | Rank |
|---|---|---|---|
| Martyna Baran | 500 m | 38.15 | 17 |
| Karolina Bosiek | 1000 m | 1:16.88 | 22 |
| Natalia Czerwonka | 1000 m | 1:16.09 | 15 |
| Natalia Czerwonka | 1500 m | 1:56.96 | 15 |
| Andżelika Wójcik | 500 m | 37.91 | 11 |
| Kaja Ziomek-Nogal | 500 m | 37.39 | 6 |

Mass start

| Athlete | Event | Semifinal | | | Final | | |
| Athlete | Event | Points | Time | Rank | Points | Time | Rank |
|---|---|---|---|---|---|---|---|
| Vladimir Semirunniy | Men's mass start | 1 | 7:46.08 | 11 | Did not advance | | 19 |
| Natalia Czerwonka | Women's mass start | 0 | 8:52.93 | 13 | Did not advance | | 27 |

== See also ==
- Poland at the 2026 Winter Paralympics
