= 2025–26 Four Hills Tournament =

Ski jumping competition

Four Hills Tournament at the 2025–26 FIS Ski Jumping World Cup
- Venue: Schattenbergschanze, Große Olympiaschanze, Bergiselschanze, Paul-Ausserleitner-Schanze
- Location: Austria, Germany
- Dates: 29 December 2025 – 6 January 2026

Medalists
gold medal	(Slovenia) Domen Prevc
silver medal	(Austria) Jan Hörl
bronze medal	(Austria) Stephan Embacher

The 2025–26 Four Hills Tournament took place at the four traditional venues of Oberstdorf, Garmisch-Partenkirchen, Innsbruck, and Bischofshofen, located in Germany and Austria, between 29 December 2025 and 6 January 2026.

The tournament was won by Domen Prevc of Slovenia. As Peter Prevc had won the 2015–16 edition, Domen and Peter became the first brothers in history with overall wins in this competition.

== Results ==
=== Oberstdorf ===
HS137 Schattenbergschanze, Germany
29 December 2025

Rank	Name	Nationality	Jump 1 (m)	Round 1 (pts)	Jump 2 (m)	Round 2 (pts)	Total Points
1	Domen Prevc	Slovenia	141.5	162.2	140.0	154.5	316.7
2	Daniel Tschofenig	Austria	132.0	152.2	134.0	147.0	299.2
3	Felix Hoffmann	Germany	132.5	149.9	136.0	147.4	297.3
4	Jan Hörl	Austria	136.5	153.9	133.0	143.2	297.1
5	Philipp Raimund	Germany	136.0	148.6	133.0	147.0	295.6
6	Ryōyū Kobayashi	Japan	133.0	146.9	136.0	148.1	295.0
7	Stephan Embacher	Austria	131.0	142.6	135.5	148.6	291.2
8	Jonas Schuster	Austria	138.5	152.4	128.5	135.3	287.7
9	Stefan Kraft	Austria	133.5	148.5	127.5	137.9	286.4
10	Kristoffer Eriksen Sundal	Norway	135.5	143.0	132.0	142.6	285.6

=== Garmisch-Partenkirchen ===
HS142 Große Olympiaschanze, Germany
1 January 2026

Rank	Name	Nationality	Jump 1 (m)	Round 1 (pts)	Jump 2 (m)	Round 2 (pts)	Total Points
1	Domen Prevc	Slovenia	143.0	149.3	141.0	153.8	303.1
2	Jan Hörl	Austria	141.0	146.1	131.5	141.6	287.7
3	Stephan Embacher	Austria	134.0	138.1	141.5	149.0	287.1
4	Ren Nikaido	Japan	137.5	138.8	138.0	145.3	284.1
5	Ryōyū Kobayashi	Japan	130.5	128.6	141.0	149.2	277.8
6	Felix Hoffmann	Germany	134.0	137.0	136.0	138.9	275.9
7	Philipp Raimund	Germany	134.0	133.4	135.0	137.6	271.0
8	Kacper Tomasiak	Poland	130.5	132.7	129.5	128.1	260.8
9	Daniel Tschofenig	Austria	132.5	128.8	129.0	128.6	257.4
10	Gregor Deschwanden	Switzerland	132.0	125.3	134.0	129.8	255.1
10	Maximilian Ortner	Austria	130.5	123.8	133.0	131.3	255.1

=== Innsbruck ===
HS128 Bergiselschanze, Austria
4 January 2026

Rank	Name	Nationality	Jump 1 (m)	Round 1 (pts)	Jump 2 (m)	Round 2 (pts)	Total Points
1	Ren Nikaido	Japan	131.0	139.8	128.0	136.7	276.5
2	Domen Prevc	Slovenia	129.5	137.3	128.0	138.7	276.0
3	Stephan Embacher	Austria	130.0	139.8	127.5	136.0	275.8
4	Jan Hörl	Austria	130.0	138.7	126.0	130.9	269.6
5	Felix Hoffmann	Germany	126.5	130.0	130.5	137.2	267.2
6	Daniel Tschofenig	Austria	125.0	126.7	128.0	128.6	255.3
7	Anže Lanišek	Slovenia	127.0	127.1	127.0	126.5	253.6
8	Kacper Tomasiak	Poland	126.0	126.6	127.0	125.4	252.0
9	Jason Colby	United States	128.5	130.9	123.5	120.0	250.9
10	Ryōyū Kobayashi	Japan	124.0	123.4	127.0	127.3	250.7

=== Bischofshofen ===
HS142 Paul-Ausserleitner-Schanze, Austria
6 January 2026

Rank	Name	Nationality	Jump 1 (m)	Round 1 (pts)	Jump 2 (m)	Round 2 (pts)	Total Points
1	Daniel Tschofenig	Austria	137.0	146.5	140.5	157.4	303.9
2	Domen Prevc	Slovenia	138.0	150.4	138.5	149.4	299.8
3	Ryōyū Kobayashi	Japan	137.0	149.6	138.0	150.0	299.6
4	Jan Hörl	Austria	135.5	146.2	139.0	152.7	298.9
5	Stephan Embacher	Austria	135.0	144.2	140.0	152.3	296.5
6	Stefan Kraft	Austria	134.0	140.3	137.0	148.4	288.7
7	Manuel Fettner	Austria	134.5	141.0	136.5	145.1	286.1
8	Ren Nikaido	Japan	132.0	134.9	141.0	146.9	281.8
9	Anže Lanišek	Slovenia	132.5	135.8	140.0	145.6	281.4
10	Felix Hoffmann	Germany	133.0	136.8	137.0	143.1	279.9

== Overall standings ==
The final standings after all four events:

Rank	Name	Nationality	Oberstdorf	Garmisch- Partenkirchen	Innsbruck	Bischofshofen	Total Points
1st place, gold medalist(s)	Domen Prevc	Slovenia	316.7 (1)	303.1 (1)	276.0 (2)	299.8 (2)	1,195.6
2nd place, silver medalist(s)	Jan Hörl	Austria	297.1 (4)	287.7 (2)	269.6 (4)	298.9 (4)	1,153.3
3rd place, bronze medalist(s)	Stephan Embacher	Austria	291.2 (7)	287.1 (3)	275.8 (3)	296.5 (5)	1,150.6
4	Ren Nikaido	Japan	281.1 (13)	284.1 (4)	276.5 (1)	281.8 (8)	1,123.5
5	Ryōyū Kobayashi	Japan	295.0 (6)	277.8 (5)	250.7 (10)	299.6 (3)	1,123.1
6	Felix Hoffmann	Germany	297.3 (3)	275.9 (6)	267.2 (5)	279.9 (10)	1,120.3
7	Daniel Tschofenig	Austria	299.2 (2)	257.4 (9)	255.3 (6)	303.9 (1)	1,115.8
8	Philipp Raimund	Germany	295.6 (5)	271.0 (7)	247.4 (12)	275.6 (12)	1,089.6
9	Anže Lanišek	Slovenia	284.6 (11)	254.9 (12)	253.6 (7)	281.4 (9)	1,074.5
10	Manuel Fettner	Austria	272.2 (16)	253.4 (13)	244.8 (14)	286.1 (7)	1,056.5
