= FIS Nordic World Ski Championships 2025 – Men's team large hill =

Men's team large hill at the FIS Nordic World Ski Championships 2025
- Venue: Granåsen Ski Centre
- Location: Trondheim, Norway
- Dates: 6 March
- Competitors: 44 from 11 nations
- Teams: 11
- Winning time: 1080.8

Medalists
gold medal	Lovro Kos; Domen Prevc; Timi Zajc; Anže Lanišek	Slovenia
silver medal	Daniel Tschofenig; Maximilian Ortner; Stefan Kraft; Jan Hörl	Austria
bronze medal	Johann André Forfang; Robin Pedersen; Kristoffer Eriksen Sundal; Marius Lindvik	Norway

The Men's team large hill competition at the FIS Nordic World Ski Championships 2025 was held on 6 March 2025.

== Results ==
The first round was started at 17:05 and the second round at 18:04.

Rank	Bib	Country	Round 1			Final round			Total
Rank	Bib	Country	Distance (m)	Points	Rank	Distance (m)	Points	Rank	Points
1st place, gold medalist(s)	8	Slovenia; Lovro Kos; Domen Prevc; Timi Zajc; Anže Lanišek	128.5; 135.0; 136.5; 137.0	523.0; 118.6; 131.7; 132.5; 140.2	1	129.5; 135.5; 128.0; 138.0	557.8; 134.6; 143.0; 128.8; 151.4	3	1080.8
2nd place, silver medalist(s)	11	Austria; Daniel Tschofenig; Maximilian Ortner; Stefan Kraft; Jan Hörl	127.0; 130.5; 134.0; 129.5	501.5; 125.9; 120.0; 131.9; 123.7	2	133.0; 134.5; 131.0; 135.0	565.9; 145.3; 141.9; 138.2; 140.5	2	1067.4
3rd place, bronze medalist(s)	10	Norway; Johann André Forfang; Robin Pedersen; Kristoffer Eriksen Sundal; Marius Lindvik	128.5; 123.5; 124.5; 137.5	483.1; 125.5; 104.7; 110.8; 142.1	3	137.5; 130.0; 134.5; 138.5	582.2; 153.1; 133.2; 142.9; 153.0	1	1065.3
4	9	Germany; Karl Geiger; Stephan Leyhe; Philipp Raimund; Andreas Wellinger	127.0; 122.5; 135.5; 132.0	479.3; 118.1; 98.6; 129.3; 133.3	4	119.0; 127.0; 135.0; 133.5	526.5; 112.7; 127.0; 142.9; 143.9	4	1005.8
5	7	Japan; Ren Nikaido; Yukiya Sato; Naoki Nakamura; Ryōyū Kobayashi	122.0; 129.5; 127.0; 133.5	463.9; 111.7; 110.6; 112.8; 128.8	5	123.5; 120.0; 124.5; 136.5	501.3; 117.6; 112.0; 125.2; 146.5	6	965.2
6	6	Poland; Aleksander Zniszczoł; Jakub Wolny; Paweł Wąsek; Dawid Kubacki	116.0; 121.0; 131.0; 127.5	449.9; 96.5; 103.1; 128.1; 122.2	6	125.5; 124.0; 131.0; 124.5	508.5; 126.1; 121.6; 137.0; 123.8	5	958.4
7	3	Finland; Kasperi Valto; Vilho Palosaari; Niko Kytösaho; Antti Aalto	125.0; 122.5; 116.5; 122.5	415.5; 113.7; 100.3; 94.2; 107.3	8	126.0; 121.5; 122.0; 129.5	489.7; 127.0; 115.2; 116.8; 130.7	7	905.2
8	4	United States; Kevin Bickner; Erik Belshaw; Jason Colby; Tate Frantz	117.5; 121.0; 118.0; 127.0	420.6; 102.7; 102.2; 94.4; 121.3	7	126.5; 119.0; 121.0; 121.5	468.0; 126.2; 111.4; 111.4; 119.0	8	888.6
9	5	Switzerland; Yanick Wasser; Simon Ammann; Killian Peier; Gregor Deschwanden	109.5; 111.5; 114.0; 128.0	403.4; 92.0; 84.0; 97.0; 130.4	9	Did not qualify			
10	2	Kazakhstan; Svyatoslav Nazarenko; Ilya Mizernykh; Sabirzhan Muminov; Danil Vassilyev	96.0; 102.0; 101.0; 104.5	271.6; 53.3; 75.1; 66.0; 77.2	10	Did not qualify			
11	1	China; Zhen Weijie; Zheng Pengbo; Lyu Yixin; Song Qiwu	84.0; 76.0; 97.5; 110.5	195.6; 29.4; 24.5; 55.9; 85.8	11	Did not qualify			
