= 2026 FIS Ski Jumping Grand Prix =

Series of ski jumping competitions

2025 FIS Ski Jumping Grand Prix
Discipline	Men	Women
Overall	(Japan) Naoki Nakamura	(Slovenia) Ema Klinec
Nations Cup	Austria	Slovenia

Competition
Edition	33rd	15th
Locations	4	4
Individual	7	7
Team	–	–
Mixed	1	1

The 2026 FIS Ski Jumping Grand Prix, organized by the International Ski Federation (FIS), wast the 33rd Summer Grand Prix season for men and the 15th for women as the most important series of ski jumping competitions in the summer and autumn of 2026.

The final ski jumping events in Klingenthal were held as a hybrid competition, featuring an ice track on the inrun, while the landing hill and outrun are covered with artificial matting.

Jason Colby took first ever Grand Prix (top level summer win) for United States, both men or women, in Râșnov.

Both Japanese Naoki Nakamura (for men) and Slovenian Ema Klinec (for women) won their first Grand Prix overall in their careers.

== Map of Grand Prix hosts ==
(Poland) Wisła	(France) Courchevel	(Romania) Râșnov	(Germany) Klingenthal
Malinka	Tremplin du Praz	Trambulină Valea	Vogtland Arena
Europe

== Men's Individual ==
The number of men's events in the Grand Prix history

Total	Large	Normal	Winners
255	188	67	78

after L event in Klingenthal (24 October 2026)

=== Calendar ===
N – normal hill / L – large hill
All	No.	Date	Place (Hill)	Size	Winner	Second	Third	Overall leader	R.
249	1	1 August 2026	(Poland) Wisła (Malinka HS134)	L _{184}	(Japan) Naoki Nakamura	(Austria) Marco Wörgötter	(Switzerland) Gregor Deschwanden	(Japan) Naoki Nakamura	
250	2	2 August 2026	(Poland) Wisła (Malinka HS134)	L _{185}	(Japan) Naoki Nakamura	(Estonia) Kaimar Vagul	(Slovenia) Rok Oblak	(Japan) Naoki Nakamura	
251	3	8 August 2026	(France) Courchevel (Tremplin du Praz HS132)	L _{186}	(Austria) Daniel Tschofenig	(Germany) Philipp Raimund	(Japan) Naoki Nakamura	(Japan) Naoki Nakamura	
252	4	9 August 2026	(France) Courchevel (Tremplin du Praz HS132)	L _{187}	(Austria) Daniel Tschofenig	(Germany) Philipp Raimund	(Austria) Stefan Kraft	(Japan) Naoki Nakamura	
253	5	19 September 2026	(Romania) Râșnov (Trambulina HS97)	N _{066}	(Japan) Naoki Nakamura	(United States) Jason Colby	(Norway) K. Eriksen Sundal	(Japan) Naoki Nakamura	
254	6	20 September 2026	(Romania) Râșnov (Trambulina HS97)	N _{067}	(United States) Jason Colby	(Poland) Paweł Wąsek	(Kazakhstan) Danil Vassilyev	(Japan) Naoki Nakamura	
255	7	24 October 2025	(Germany) Klingenthal (Vogtland Arena HS140)	L _{188}	(Norway) Marius Lindvik	(Japan) Ren Nikaidō	(Poland) Klemens Joniak	(Japan) Naoki Nakamura	
33rd FIS Grand Prix Overall (1 August – 24 October 2026)					(Japan) Naoki Nakamura	(Austria) Daniel Tschofenig	(Kazakhstan) Danil Vassilyev	Men's Overall	

=== Standings ===
==== Overall ====
Rank	after all 7 events	Points
	(Japan) Naoki Nakamura	450
2	(Austria) Daniel Tschofenig	216
3	(Kazakhstan) Danil Vassilyev	201
4	(Switzerland) Gregor Deschwanden	196
5	(Estonia) Kaimar Vagus	187
6	(United States) Jason Colby	180
7	(Norway) Marius Lindvik	176
8	(Germany) Philipp Raimund	172
9	(Norway) Kristoffer Eriksen Sundal	170
10	(Switzerland) Juri Kesseli	130

==== Nations Cup ====
Rank	after all 8 events	Points
	Austria	1048
2	Japan	850
3	Norway	815
4	Switzerland	457
5	Poland	455
6	Slovenia	405
7	Germany	384
8	United States	324
9	Kazakhstan	307
10	Estonia	232

==== Prize money ====
Rank	after all of 8 payouts	euro (€)
1	(Japan) Naoki Nakamura	18,100
2	(Austria) Daniel Tschofenig	10,600
3	(United States) Jason Colby	8,500
4	(Norway) Marius Lindvik	7,200
5	(Germany) Philipp Raimund	6,400
6	(Norway) Kristoffer Eriksen Sundal	5,100
7	(Japan) Ren Nikaidō	3,700
	(Estonia) Kaimar Vagul	3,700
	(Kazakhstan) Danil Vassilyev	3,700
	(Switzerland) Gregor Deschwanden	3,700

== Women's Individual ==
The number of women's events in the Grand Prix history

Total	Large	Normal	Winners
74	31	43	20

after L event in Klingenthal (24 October 2026)

=== Calendar ===
N – normal hill / L – large hill
All	No.	Date	Place (Hill)	Size	Winner	Second	Third	Overall leader	R.
68	1	1 August 2026	(Poland) Wisła (Malinka HS134)	L _{027}	(Slovenia) Ema Klinec	(Norway) Silje Opseth	(France) Joséphine Pagnier	(Slovenia) Ema Klinec	
69	2	2 August 2026	(Poland) Wisła (Malinka HS134)	L _{028}	(Slovenia) Nika Vodan	(Japan) Yūki Itō	(Norway) Silje Opseth	(Slovenia) Nika Vodan	
70	3	8 August 2029	(France) Courchevel (Tremplin du Praz HS132)	L _{029}	(Norway) Anna Odine Strøm	(Japan) Yūki Itō	(Norway) Ingvild Midtskogen	(Slovenia) Ema Klinec	
71	4	9 August 2026	(France) Courchevel (Tremplin du Praz HS132)	L _{030}	(Japan) Yūki Itō	(Germany) Selina Freitag	(China) Zeng Ping	(Japan) Yūki Itō	
72	5	19 September 2026	(Romania) Râșnov (Trambulina HS97)	N _{042}	(Poland) Anna Twardosz	(Japan) Ringo Miyajima	(China) Dong Bing	(Slovenia) Ema Klinec	
73	6	20 September 2026	(Romania) Râșnov (Trambulina HS97)	N _{043}	(Poland) Anna Twardosz	(China) Zeng Ping	(Slovenia) Ema Klinec	(Slovenia) Ema Klinec	
74	7	24 October 2026	(Germany) Klingenthal (Vogtland Arena HS140)	L _{031}	(Norway) Ingvild Midtskogen	(Slovenia) Nika Prevc	(Norway) Eirin Maria Kvandal	(Slovenia) Ema Klinec	
15th FIS Grand Prix Women's Overall (1 August – 24 October 2026)					(Slovenia) Ema Klinec	(Poland) Anna Twardosz	(Japan) Yūki Itō	Women's Overall	

=== Standings ===
==== Overall ====
Rank	after all 7 events	Points
	(Slovenia) Ema Klinec	363
2	(Poland) Anna Twardosz	294
3	(Japan) Yūki Itō	278
4	(China) Zeng Ping	272
5	(Norway) Ingvild Midtskogen	255
6	(Japan) Ringo Miyajima	228
7	(France) Joséphine Pagnier	215
8	(Slovenia) Nika Vodan	195
9	(Japan) Kurumi Ichinohe	153
10	(Norway) Anna Odine Strøm	141

==== Nations Cup ====
Rank	after all 8 events	Points
	Slovenia	1481
2	Norway	1362
3	Japan	1307
4	Germany	761
5	China	448
6	Austria	437
7	Finland	373
8	Poland	294
9	France	240
10	Canada	147

==== Prize money ====
Rank	after all 8 payouts	euro (€)
1	(Norway) Ingvild Midtskogen	5,900
2	(Japan) Yūki Itō	5,850
3	(Poland) Anna Twardosz	5,300
4	(Slovenia) Ema Klinec	5,000
5	(Slovenia) Nika Vodan	4,150
6	(China) Zeng Ping	2,950
7	(Norway) Anna Odine Strøm	2,900
8	(Norway) Silje Opseth	2,750
9	(Japan) Ringo Miyajima	2,700
10	(France) Joséphine Pagnier	2,600

== Team events ==
The number of team events in the Grand Prix history

Total	Large	Normal	Winners	Competition
13	8	5	4	Mixed team

after L event in Klingenthal (26 October 2026)

=== Calendar ===
L – large hill
All	No.	Date	Place (Hill)	Size	Winner	Second	Third	R.
Mixed team
13	1	25 October 2026	(Germany) Klingenthal (Vogtland Arena HS140)	L _{008}	Norway Ingvild Synnøve Midtskogen; Kristoffer Eriksen Sundal; Eirin Maria Kvandal; Marius Lindvik	Slovenia Nika Vodan; Timi Zajc; Nika Prevc; Domen Prevc	Japan Nozomi Maruyama; Ryōyū Kobayashi; Ringo Miyajima; Ren Nikaidō	

== See also ==
- 2026–27 FIS Ski Jumping World Cup
- 2026–27 FIS Ski Flying World Cup
- 2026–27 FIS Ski Jumping Continental Cup (men)
- 2026–27 FIS Ski Jumping Inter-Continental Cup (women)
