= Kacper Tomasiak =

Polish ski jumper (born 2007)

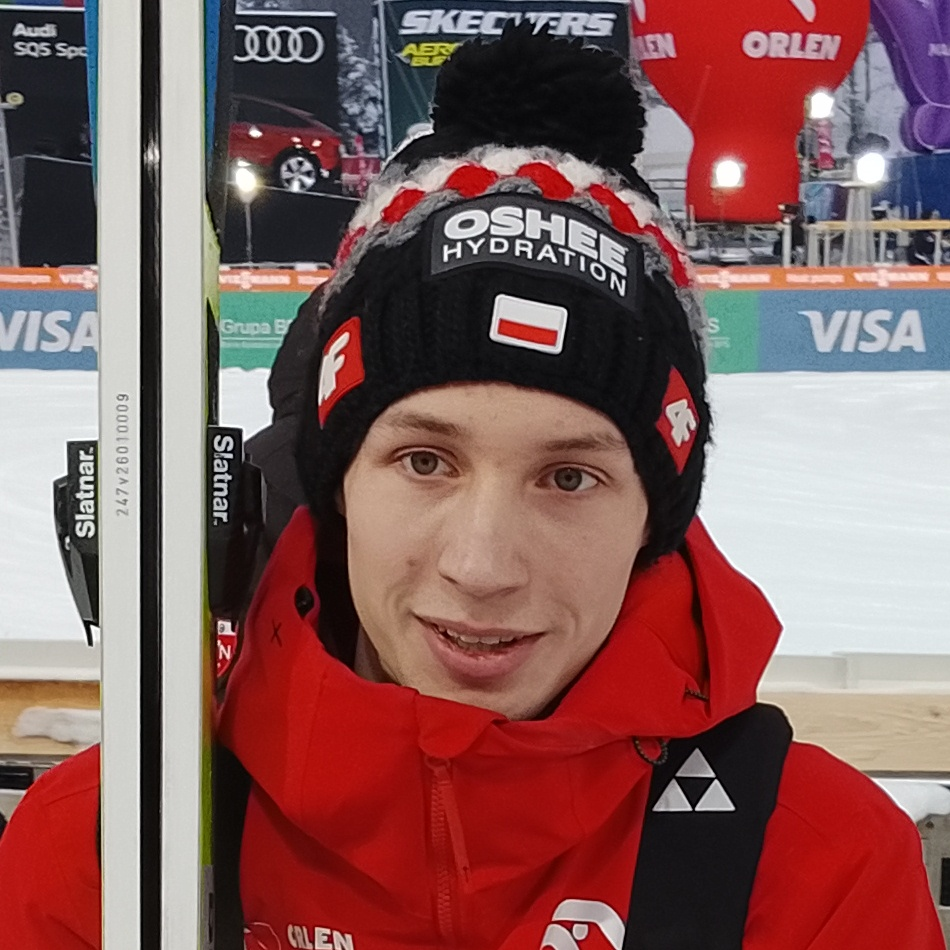
- Tomasiak in 2026

Personal information
- Born: 20 January 2007 (age 19) Bielsko-Biała, Poland

Sport
- Sport: Ski jumping

World Cup career
- Seasons: 2025–present
- Indiv. starts: 24
- Team starts: 2
- Team podiums: 1
Medal record
Men's ski jumping
Representing Poland
Olympic Games
| Silver medal – second place | 2026 Milano Cortina | Individual NH |
| Silver medal – second place | 2026 Milano Cortina | Super team LH |
| Bronze medal – third place | 2026 Milano Cortina | Individual LH |
Continental Cup
| Gold medal – first place | 2025–26 Summer | Individual NH |
Junior World Championships
| Silver medal – second place | 2023 Whistler | Team NH |
| Silver medal – second place | 2026 Lillehammer | Individual NH |

Kacper Tomasiak (born 20 January 2007) is a Polish ski jumper. He won silver medals in the individual normal hill and large hill super team events, and a bronze medal in the individual large hill at the 2026 Winter Olympics.

== Career ==
Tomasiak competed at the 2023 Nordic Junior World Ski Championships and won a silver medal in the team normal hill event. During the 2022–23 FIS Cup, he earned his first career FIS Cup victory on 9 March 2023. He represented Poland at the 2024 Winter Youth Olympics and finished in fifth place in the mixed team normal hill and seventh place in the individual normal hill.

During the 2025–26 FIS Ski Jumping Continental Cup, he won the summer overall title, finishing with 362 points. After winning the Continental Cup, he was called up to compete at the World Cup. During the 2025–26 Four Hills Tournament, he earned his first top-ten finish in a Four Hills Tournament event on 1 January 2026. During the 2025–26 FIS Ski Jumping World Cup, he earned his first super team podium on 10 January 2026, finishing in third place.

He was subsequently selected to represent Poland at the 2026 Winter Olympics. On 9 February 2026, he won a silver medal in the individual normal hill event with a score of 270.7. This was Poland's first medal at the 2026 Winter Olympics. On 14 February, he won a bronze medal in the individual large hill event with a score of 291.2. On 16 February, he won a silver medal in the large hill super team, along with Paweł Wąsek.

== World Cup results ==
=== Standings ===
| Season | Overall | 4H | SF | RA | P7 | NC |
|---|---|---|---|---|---|---|
| 2025–26 | 18 | 12 | – | – | – | 6 |

=== Individual starts ===
winner (1); second (2); third (3); did not compete (–); failed to qualify (q); disqualified (DQ)
| Season | 1 | 2 | 3 | 4 | 5 | 6 | 7 | 8 | 9 | 10 | 11 | 12 | 13 | 14 | 15 | 16 | 17 | 18 | 19 | 20 | 21 | 22 | 23 | 24 | 25 | 26 | 27 | 28 | 29 | 30 | Points |
| 2025–26 | Lillehammer | Lillehammer | Falun | Falun | Ruka | Wisła | Wisła | Klingenthal | Klingenthal | Engelberg | Engelberg | Oberstdorf | Garmisch-Partenkirchen | Innsbruck | Bischofshofen | Zakopane | Sapporo | Sapporo | Willingen | Willingen | Bad Mitterndorf | Bad Mitterndorf | Lahti | Lahti | Oslo | Oslo | Vikersund | Vikersund | Planica | Planica | 391 |
| 2025–26 | 18 | 22 | 12 | 15 | 18 | 25 | 5 | 18 | 32 | 13 | 5 | 14 | 8 | 8 | 19 | 11 | 33 | 12 | – | – | – | – | 24 | 10 | 22 | 24 | Q | Q | – | – | 391 |

=== Team starts ===
winner (1); second (2); third (3); did not compete (–)
| Season | 1 | 2 | 3 | 4 | 5 | Points |
| 2025–26 | Lillehammer | Zakopane | Willingen | Lahti | Planica | 340 |
| 2025–26 | 6 | | – | 6 | – | 340 |

== Olympic results ==
| Year | Age | Normal Hill | Large Hill | Team | Mixed Team |
|---|---|---|---|---|---|
| (Italy) Milano-Cortina 2026 | 19 | Silver medal | Bronze medal | Silver medal | 11 |

== Other Tournament Results ==
=== Summer Grand Prix ===
| Season | 1 | 2 | 3 | 4 | 5 | 6 | 7 | 8 | 9 | 10 | 11 | Points |
| 2025 | Courchevel | Courchevel | Wisła | Wisła | Râșnov | Râșnov | Val di Fiemme | Val di Fiemme | Hinzenbach | Hinzenbach | Klingenthal | 32 |
| 2025 | – | – | – | – | – | – | – | – | – | – | 8 | 32 |
| 2026 | Wisła | Wisła | Courchevel | Courchevel | Râșnov | Râșnov | Klingemthal | | | | | 62 |
| 2026 | 7 | 10 | – | – | | | | | | | | 62 |

=== Continental Cup ===
| Season | 1 | 2 | 3 | 4 | 5 | 6 | 7 | 8 | 9 | 10 | 11 | 12 | 13 | 14 | 15 | 16 | 17 | 18 | 19 | 20 | 21 | 22 | 23 | 24 | 25 | 26 | 27 | Points |
| 2022–23 | Vikersund | Vikersund | Ruka | Ruka | Engelberg | Engelberg | Planica | Planica | Sapporo | Sapporo | Sapporo | Eisenerz | Eisenerz | Klingemthal | Klingemthal | Rena | Rena | Iron Mountain | Iron Mountain | Iron Mountain | Iron Mountain | Wisła | Wisła | Lahti | Lahti | | | 15 |
| 2022–23 | – | – | – | – | – | – | – | – | – | – | – | – | – | – | – | 23 | 24 | – | – | – | – | 42 | 31 | – | – | | | 15 |
| 2023–24 | Lillehammer | Lillehammer | Ruka | Ruka | Engelberg | Engelberg | Garmisch-Partenkirchen | Garmisch-Partenkirchen | Innsbruck | Innsbruck | Sapporo | Sapporo | Sapporo | Willingen | Willingen | Lillehammer | Lillehammer | Brotterode | Brotterode | Iron Mountain | Iron Mountain | Planica | Planica | Lahti | Lahti | Zakopane | Zakopane | 3 |
| 2023–24 | – | – | – | – | 35 | 31 | 38 | 47 | – | – | – | – | – | – | – | – | – | – | – | – | – | 28 | 49 | 32 | 33 | 40 | 36 | 3 |
| 2024–25 | Zhangjiakou | Zhangjiakou | Ruka | Ruka | Engelberg | Engelberg | Bischofshofen | Bischofshofen | Sapporo | Sapporo | Sapporo | Lillehammer | Lillehammer | Kranj | Kranj | Iron Mountain | Iron Mountain | Iron Mountain | Iron Mountain | Lahti | Lahti | Zakopane | Zakopane | | | | | 62 |
| 2024–25 | 23 | 23 | – | – | – | – | – | – | – | – | – | – | – | – | – | 28 | 29 | 26 | 27 | 34 | 17 | 33 | 14 | | | | | 62 |

=== Summer Continental Cup ===
| Season | 1 | 2 | 3 | 4 | 5 | 6 | 7 | 8 | 9 | Points |
| 2023–24 | Oslo | Oslo | Stams | Stams | Klingenthal | Klingenthal | Lake Placid | Lake Placid | Lake Placid | 2 |
| 2023–24 | – | – | – | – | 29 | 42 | – | – | – | 2 |
| 2024–25 | Hinterzarten | Hinterzarten | Trondheim | Trondheim | Stams | Stams | Klingenthal | Klingenthal | | 6 |
| 2024–25 | 44 | 25 | – | – | – | – | – | – | | 6 |
| 2025–26 | Stams | Stams | Hinterzarten | Hinterzarten | Klingenthal | Klingenthal | | | | 362 |
| 2025–26 | DQ | 1 | 2 | 1 | 8 | 4 | | | | 362 |

== Personal life ==
Tomasiak is the eldest of five siblings. His two brothers, Konrad and Filip, are also ski jumpers. He is also an altar server at his local church, the Parish of the Sacred Heart of Jesus in his hometown of Bielsko-Biała.
