= Ski jumping at the 2026 Winter Olympics – Men's normal hill individual =

Men's normal hill individual at the XXV Olympic Winter Games
- Ski jumping
- Venue: Predazzo Ski Jumping Stadium, Predazzo
- Date: 9 February 2026
- Winning points: 274.1

Medalists
1st place, gold medalist(s)		Philipp Raimund	Germany
2nd place, silver medalist(s)		Kacper Tomasiak	Poland
3rd place, bronze medalist(s)		Ren Nikaidō	Japan
3rd place, bronze medalist(s)		Gregor Deschwanden	Switzerland

The men's normal hill individual competition of the 2026 Olympics was held on 9 February, at the Predazzo Ski Jumping Stadium in Predazzo. Philipp Raimund of Germany won the event, Kacper Tomasiak of Poland won the silver medal, and Ren Nikaidō of Japan and Gregor Deschwanden of Switzerland, who had the same result, both won bronze medals. For all of them, these were the first Olympic medals. This was the first tie for medals in Olympic ski jumping since 1980.

== Background ==
All three 2022 medalists, Ryōyū Kobayashi, the champion, Manuel Fettner, the silver medalist, and Dawid Kubacki, the bronze medalist, kept competing and qualified for the Olympics. Fettner and Kubacki were not selected for the individual normal hill competition. Before the Olympics, Domen Prevc was leading the 2025–26 FIS Ski Jumping World Cup ranking, having won 11 out of 20 events. Marius Lindvik was also the 2025 World champion on the normal hill. The field also included the 2014 Olympic champion Kamil Stoch, who did not qualify for the final jump.

== Schedule ==
=== Official training ===
GMT	Date	Event	Round	Country	Winner	Distance
20:00	5 February 2026	Official training 1	R1	Austria	Stefan Kraft	103.0 m (337.9 ft)
20:00	5 February 2026	Official training 1	R2	Germany	Felix Hoffmann	102.5 m (336 ft)
20:00	5 February 2026	Official training 1	R3	Norway	Kristoffer Eriksen Sundal	102.0 m (334.6 ft)
19:00	8 February 2026	Official training 2	R1	Germany	Philipp Raimund	100.0 m (328.1 ft)
19:00	8 February 2026	Official training 2	R2	Germany	Philipp Raimund	104.0 m (341.2 ft)
19:00	8 February 2026	Official training 2	R3	Norway	Marius Lindvik	105.5 m (346 ft)

=== Competition ===
GMT	Date	Event	Round	Country	Winner	Distance
18:00	9 February 2026	Trial round	TR	Norway	Marius Lindvik	104.0 m (341.2 ft)
19:00	9 February 2026	1st round	1R	Germany	Philipp Raimund	102.0 m (334.6 ft)
20:12	9 February 2026	Final round	2R	Germany	Philipp Raimund	106.5 m (349 ft)

== Results ==
The final was held on 9 February at 19:00.

Rank	Bib	Name	Country	Round 1			Final round			Total
Rank	Bib	Name	Country	Distance (m)	Points	Rank	Distance (m)	Points	Rank	Points
1st place, gold medalist(s)	45	Philipp Raimund	Germany	102.0	135.6	1	106.5	138.5	1	274.1
2nd place, silver medalist(s)	38	Kacper Tomasiak	Poland	103.0	132.8	=4	107.0	137.9	2	270.7
3rd place, bronze medalist(s)	31	Gregor Deschwanden	Switzerland	106.0	132.8	=4	107.0	133.2	5	266.0
3rd place, bronze medalist(s)	48	Ren Nikaidō	Japan	101.0	131.1	6	106.5	134.9	4	266.0
5	34	Valentin Foubert	France	102.5	134.6	2	102.5	128.7	16	263.3
6	50	Domen Prevc	Slovenia	100.0	130.6	8	105.0	131.2	7	261.8
7	42	Stephan Embacher	Austria	100.5	125.0	19	105.5	136.2	3	261.2
8	49	Ryōyū Kobayashi	Japan	100.5	130.8	7	104.0	129.8	10	260.6
9	35	Johann André Forfang	Norway	103.5	129.5	12	103.0	130.3	9	259.8
10	40	Kristoffer Eriksen Sundal	Norway	103.5	132.9	3	105.0	126.7	19	259.6
11	44	Jan Hörl	Austria	101.5	128.5	=13	104.0	130.9	8	259.4
12	37	Marius Lindvik	Norway	103.5	130.4	9	104.5	127.9	17	258.3
13	43	Felix Hoffmann	Germany	100.0	128.5	=13	102.5	128.8	15	257.3
14	2	Vilho Palosaari	Finland	100.5	124.4	23	103.0	132.6	6	257.0
15	46	Daniel Tschofenig	Austria	100.0	130.0	11	101.5	125.0	25	255.0
15	36	Naoki Nakamura	Japan	103.5	130.2	10	104.0	124.8	26	255.0
17	27	Andreas Wellinger	Germany	102.5	125.1	18	104.0	129.4	13	254.5
18	17	Felix Trunz	Switzerland	101.5	124.0	=25	100.0	129.6	12	253.6
19	16	Giovanni Bresadola	Italy	102.5	126.8	15	102.0	125.9	20	252.7
20	29	Jason Colby	United States	102.0	122.5	=30	100.5	129.8	10	252.3
21	33	Timi Zajc	Slovenia	99.0	126.5	16	100.5	125.4	24	251.9
21	13	Tate Frantz	United States	99.5	122.5	=30	101.5	129.4	13	251.9
23	32	Pius Paschke	Germany	101.0	126.1	17	101.5	125.7	22	251.8
24	28	Niko Kytösaho	Finland	101.5	124.0	=25	101.0	126.9	18	250.9
25	26	Antti Aalto	Finland	100.0	124.8	=20	102.0	125.6	23	250.4
26	47	Anže Lanišek	Slovenia	97.5	123.7	28	97.5	125.9	20	249.6
27	41	Stefan Kraft	Austria	98.0	124.1	24	100.0	123.9	27	248.0
28	15	Hektor Kapustík	Slovakia	102.0	124.6	22	98.5	121.1	28	245.7
29	24	Sandro Hauswirth	Switzerland	100.0	124.8	=20	98.5	120.8	29	245.6
30	1	Enzo Milesi	France	99.5	124.0	=25	95.5	117.4	30	241.4
31	9	Song Qiwu	China	101.0	122.9	29	93.5	114.3	31	237.2
32	39	Vladimir Zografski	Bulgaria	98.0	121.5	32	Did not advance			
33	22	Kevin Bickner	United States	100.0	121.1	33	Did not advance			
34	19	Danil Vassilyev	Kazakhstan	101.0	120.3	34	Did not advance			
35	23	Paweł Wąsek	Poland	97.5	119.8	35	Did not advance			
36	6	Kaimar Vagul	Estonia	99.0	119.5	36	Did not advance			
37	18	Alex Insam	Italy	99.5	119.4	37	Did not advance			
38	30	Kamil Stoch	Poland	100.0	119.2	38	Did not advance			
39	20	Ilya Mizernykh	Kazakhstan	100.0	117.0	39	Did not advance			
40	21	Roman Koudelka	Czech Republic	99.0	115.8	40	Did not advance			
41	10	Francesco Cecon	Italy	98.0	113.8	41	Did not advance			
42	14	Yevhen Marusiak	Ukraine	99.0	113.6	42	Did not advance			
43	3	Jules Chervet	France	96.0	112.7	43	Did not advance			
44	4	Fatih Arda İpcioğlu	Turkey	98.0	111.1	44	Did not advance			
45	11	Mackenzie Boyd-Clowes	Canada	95.0	110.8	45	Did not advance			
46	5	Daniel Cacina	Romania	94.0	109.6	46	Did not advance			
47	12	Vitaliy Kalinichenko	Ukraine	94.5	104.5	47	Did not advance			
48	7	Muhammed Ali Bedir	Turkey	87.0	93.1	48	Did not advance			
49	8	Mihnea Spulber	Romania	87.5	91.0	49	Did not advance			
	25	Artti Aigro	Estonia	Did not start						
