= Ilya Mizernykh =

Kazakhstani ski jumper (born 2007)

Personal information
- Native name: Илья Мизерных
- Born: 7 February 2007 (age 19) Almaty, Kazakhstan

Sport
- Sport: Ski jumping

World Cup career
- Seasons: 2024–present
- Indiv. starts: 27
- Team starts: 7

Achievements and titles
- Personal bests: 219 m (719 ft); Kulm, 1 March 2026
Medal record
Men's ski jumping
Representing Kazakhstan
Winter Youth Olympics
Gold medal – first place	2024 Gangwon	Individual NH
- Updated on 29 March 2026

Ilya Mizernykh (Russian: Илья Мизерных; born 7 February 2007) is a Kazakh ski jumper.

== Career ==
Mizernykh represented Kazakhstan at the 2024 Winter Youth Olympics and won a gold medal in the individual normal hill event with a total of 214.0 points. He became the first Kazakhstani athlete to win a gold medal at the Winter Youth Olympics.

In January 2026, he was selected to represent Kazakhstan at the 2026 Winter Olympics. He finished in eighth place in the large hill individual event, the best Kazakhstani ski jumping individual result in Winter Olympics history.

== Major tournament results ==
=== Winter Olympics ===
Year	Place	Individual		Team	
Year	Place	Normal	Large	Super	Mixed
2026	(Italy) Milano Cortina	39	8	11	—

=== FIS Nordic World Ski Championships ===
Year	Place	Individual		Team	
Year	Place	Normal	Large	Men	Mixed
2025	(Norway) Trondheim	47	q	10	15

== World Cup ==
=== Standings ===
Season	Overall	4H	SF	RA	P7
2023–24	—	—	—	—	50
2024–25	60	53	—	49	54
2025–26	42	32	41	N/A	—

=== Individual starts ===
winner (1); second (2); third (3); did not compete (–); failed to qualify (q); disqualified (DQ)
Season	1	2	3	4	5	6	7	8	9	10	11	12	13	14	15	16	17	18	19	20	21	22	23	24	25	26	27	28	29	30	31	32	Points
2023–24	Ruka	Ruka	Lillehammer	Lillehammer	Klingenthal	Klingenthal	Engelberg	Engelberg	Oberstdorf	Garmisch-Partenkirchen	Innsbruck	Bischofshofen	Wisła	Zakopane	Willingen	Willingen	Lake Placid, New York	Lake Placid, New York	Sapporo	Sapporo	Oberstdorf	Oberstdorf	Lahti	Lahti	Oslo	Oslo	Trondheim	Trondheim	Vikersund	Vikersund	Planica	Planica	0
2023–24	–	–	–	q	q	q	q	q	q	q	q	q	–	–	–	–	–	–	–	–	–	–	q	q	–	–	–	–	–	–	q	–	0
2024–25	Lillehammer	Lillehammer	Ruka	Ruka	Wisła	Wisła	Titisee-Neustadt	Titisee-Neustadt	Engelberg	Engelberg	Oberstdorf	Garmisch-Partenkirchen	Innsbruck	Bischofshofen	Zakopane	Oberstdorf	Oberstdorf	Willingen	Willingen	Lake Placid	Lake Placid	Sapporo	Sapporo	Oslo	Vikersund	Vikersund	Lahti	Planica	Planica				6
2024–25	q	q	q	25	49	DQ	35	45	48	q	42	q	46	q	43	–	–	–	–	q	q	–	–	47	q	49	q	q	–				6
2025–26	Lillehammer	Lillehammer	Falun	Falun	Ruka	Wisła	Wisła	Klingenthal	Klingenthal	Engelberg	Engelberg	Oberstdorf	Garmisch-Partenkirchen	Innsbruck	Bischofshofen	Zakopane	Sapporo	Sapporo	Willingen	Willingen	Bad Mitterndorf	Bad Mitterndorf	Lahti	Lahti	Oslo	Oslo	Vikersund	Planica	Planica				65
2025–26	48	46	q	47	46	27	37	38	33	q	22	24	31	20	q	–	–	–	–	–	28	40	–	–	16	15	q	–	–				65
