= 2025 FIS Ski Jumping Grand Prix =

Series of ski jumping competitions

Discipline	Men	Women
Overall	(Germany) Philipp Raimund	(Japan) Nozomi Maruyama
Nations Cup	Austria	Japan

Competition
Edition	32nd	14th
Locations	6	5
Individual	11	9
Team	1	–
Mixed	1	1

The 2025 FIS Ski Jumping Grand Prix, organized by the International Ski Federation (FIS), is the 32nd Summer Grand Prix season for men and the 14th for women as the most important series of ski jumping competitions in the summer and autumn of 2025.

On 10 August 2025 in Courchevel (and later in Wisła), a new competition format called High Five was introduced for both men and women. In the men’s events, 50 athletes are divided into 10 groups, with the top two from each group advancing to the final, along with five additional "lucky losers". Only the results from the final round are counted. The women’s format follows the same rules, with 40 athletes divided into eight groups. The competitions in Hinzenbach (men only) and Klingenthal will feature a combined setup: an ice inrun track paired with a plastic landing area.

== Map of Grand Prix hosts ==
(France) Courchevel	(Poland) Wisła	(Romania) Râșnov	(Italy) Val di Fiemme	(Austria) Hinzenbach	(Germany) Klingenthal
Tremplin du Praz	Malinka	Trambulină Valea	Giuseppe Dal Ben	Aigner-Schanze	Vogtland Arena
Europe

== Men's Individual ==
The number of men's events in the Grand Prix history

Total	Large	Normal	Winners
248	183	65	76

after L event in Klingenthal (25 October 2025)

=== Calendar ===
N – normal hill / L – large hill
All	No.	Date	Place (Hill)	Size	Winner	Second	Third	Overall leader	R.
238	1	9 August 2025	(France) Courchevel (Tremplin du Praz HS132)	L _{178}	(Norway) Marius Lindvik	(Germany) Philipp Raimund	(Japan) Sakutarō Kobayashi	(Norway) Marius Lindvik	
239	2	10 August 2025	(France) Courchevel (Tremplin du Praz HS132)	L _{179}	(Austria) Niklas Bachlinger	(Germany) Philipp Raimund	(Germany) Luca Roth	(Germany) Philipp Raimund	
240	3	16 August 2025	(Poland) Wisła (Malinka HS134)	L _{180}	(Poland) Maciej Kot	(Austria) Niklas Bachlinger	(Poland) Kamil Stoch	(Austria) Niklas Bachlinger	
241	4	17 August 2025	(Poland) Wisła (Malinka HS134)	L _{181}	(Austria) Niklas Bachlinger	(Bulgaria) Vladimir Zografski (Kazakhstan) Danil Vassilyev		(Austria) Niklas Bachlinger	
242	5	13 September 2025	(Romania) Râșnov (Trambulina HS97)	N _{061}	(Poland) Dawid Kubacki	(Japan) Sakutarō Kobayashi	(Japan) Ren Nikaido	(Austria) Niklas Bachlinger	
243	6	14 September 2025	(Romania) Râșnov (Trambulina HS97)	N _{062}	(Japan) Sakutarō Kobayashi	(Japan) Naoki Nakamura	(Austria) Stephan Embacher	(Austria) Niklas Bachlinger	
244	7	18 September 2025	(Italy) Val di Fiemme (Giuseppe Dal Ben HS109 / 143)	N _{063}	(Austria) Jan Hörl	(Austria) Daniel Tschofenig	(Japan) Ryōyū Kobayashi	(Austria) Niklas Bachlinger	
245	8	20 September 2025	(Italy) Val di Fiemme (Giuseppe Dal Ben HS109 / 143)	L _{182}	(Japan) Ryōyū Kobayashi	(Austria) Manuel Fettner	(Germany) Philipp Raimund	(Austria) Niklas Bachlinger	
246	9	18 October 2025	(Austria) Hinzenbach (Aigner-Schanze HS90)	N _{064}	(Germany) Philipp Raimund	(Austria) Daniel Tschofenig	(Austria) Jan Hörl	(Austria) Niklas Bachlinger	
247	10	19 October 2025	(Austria) Hinzenbach (Aigner-Schanze HS90)	N _{065}	(Austria) Jan Hörl	(Austria) Daniel Tschofenig	(Japan) Ryōyū Kobayashi	(Germany) Philipp Raimund	
248	11	25 October 2025	(Germany) Klingenthal (Vogtland Arena HS140)	L _{183}	(Japan) Ryōyū Kobayashi	(Germany) Philipp Raimund	(Slovenia) Domen Prevc	(Germany) Philipp Raimund	
32nd FIS Grand Prix Overall (9 August – 25 October 2025)					(Germany) Philipp Raimund	(Japan) Ryōyū Kobayashi	(Austria) Niklas Bachlinger	Men's Overall	

=== Standings ===
==== Overall ====
Rank	after all 11 events	Points
	(Germany) Philipp Raimund	490
2	(Japan) Sakutarō Kobayashi	392
3	(Austria) Niklas Bachlinger	391
4	(Japan) Ryōyū Kobayashi	356
5	(Poland) Kamil Stoch	319
6	(Japan) Naoki Nakamura	315
7	(Poland) Dawid Kubacki	306
8	(Austria) Jan Hörl	284
9	(Austria) Daniel Tschofenig	276
10	(Japan) Ren Nikaidō	230

==== Nations Cup ====
Rank	after all 13 events	Points
	Austria	1904
2	Japan	1857
3	Poland	1468
4	Germany	1064
5	Slovenia	1041
6	Switzerland	619
7	Norway	515
8	Finland	205
9	United States	182
10	Italy	153

==== Prize money ====
Rank	after all of 13 payouts	euro (€)
1	(Germany) Philipp Raimund	17,750
2	(Japan) Ryōyū Kobayashi	16,750
3	(Austria) Niklas Bachlinger	14,000
4	(Austria) Jan Hörl	12,000
5	(Japan) Sakutarō Kobayashi	11,000
6	(Austria) Daniel Tschofenig	9,000
7	(Poland) Dawid Kubacki	8,000
8	(Poland) Kamil Stoch	7,500
9	(Norway) Marius Lindvik	6,750
10	(Poland) Maciej Kot	6,000

== Women's Individual ==
The number of women's events in the Grand Prix history

Total	Large	Normal	Winners
67	26	41	18

after L event in Klingenthal (25 October 2025)

=== Calendar ===
N – normal hill / L – large hill
All	No.	Date	Place (Hill)	Size	Winner	Second	Third	Overall leader	R.
59	1	9 August 2025	(France) Courchevel (Tremplin du Praz HS132)	L _{021}	(Slovenia) Nika Prevc	(Germany) Selina Freitag	(Canada) Abigail Strate	(Slovenia) Nika Prevc	
60	2	10 August 2025	(France) Courchevel (Tremplin du Praz HS132)	L _{022}	(Canada) Abigail Strate	(Germany) Selina Freitag	(Japan) Nozomi Maruyama	(Canada) Abigail Strate	
61	3	16 August 2025	(Poland) Wisła (Malinka HS134)	L _{023}	(Slovenia) Nika Prevc	(Japan) Nozomi Maruyama	(Canada) Abigail Strate	(Slovenia) Nika Prevc	
62	4	17 August 2025	(Poland) Wisła (Malinka HS134)	L _{024}	(Slovenia) Nika Prevc	(Japan) Nozomi Maruyama	(Canada) Abigail Strate	(Slovenia) Nika Prevc	
63	5	13 September 2025	(Romania) Râșnov (Trambulina HS97)	N _{039}	(Japan) Yuzuki Sato	(Japan) Nozomi Maruyama	(Poland) Anna Twardosz	(Japan) Nozomi Maruyama	
64	6	14 September 2025	(Romania) Râșnov (Trambulina HS97)	N _{040}	(Japan) Kurumi Ichinohe	(Japan) Nozomi Maruyama	(Poland) Anna Twardosz	(Japan) Nozomi Maruyama	
65	7	18 September 2025	(Italy) Val di Fiemme (Giuseppe Dal Ben HS109 / 143)	N _{041}	(Canada) Abigail Strate	(Slovenia) Nika Prevc	(Japan) Yūka Setō	(Japan) Nozomi Maruyama	
66	8	20 September 2025	(Italy) Val di Fiemme (Giuseppe Dal Ben HS109 / 143)	L _{025}	(Norway) Anna Odine Strøm	(Japan) Yūka Setō	(Japan) Nozomi Maruyama	(Japan) Nozomi Maruyama	
67	9	25 October 2025	(Germany) Klingenthal (Vogtland Arena HS140)	L _{026}	(Japan) Nozomi Maruyama	(Slovenia) Nika Prevc	(Japan) Yūki Itō	(Japan) Nozomi Maruyama	
14th FIS Grand Prix Overall (9 August – 25 October 2025)					(Japan) Nozomi Maruyama	(Slovenia) Nika Prevc	(Japan) Sara Takanashi	Women's Overall	

=== Standings ===
==== Overall ====
Rank	after all 9 events	Points
	(Japan) Nozomi Maruyama	625
2	(Slovenia) Nika Prevc	555
3	(Japan) Sara Takanashi	411
4	(Canada) Abigail Strate	380
5	(Japan) Yuzuki Satō	378
6	(Japan) Yūka Setō	359
7	(Japan) Kurumi Ichinohe	343
8	(Poland) Anna Twardosz	280
9	(Germany) Selina Freitag	255
10	(Germany) Juliane Seyfarth	142

==== Nations Cup ====
Rank	after all 10 events	Points
	Japan	2,442
3	Slovenia	1,092
2	Germany	989
4	Canada	574
5	Poland	455
6	Norway	429
7	United States	244
8	Finland	210
9	China	174
10	Austria	164

==== Prize money ====
Rank	after all 10 events	euro (€)
1	(Japan) Nozomi Maruyama	12,250
2	(Slovenia) Nika Prevc	12,000
3	(Canada) Abigail Strate	8,000
4	(Japan) Sara Takanashi	4,750
5	(Japan) Yuzuki Satō	3,750
6	(Germany) Selina Freitag	3,500
7	(Japan) Yūka Setō	3,250
8	(Norway) Anna Odine Strøm	3,000
9	(Japan) Kurumi Ichinohe	3,000
10	(Poland) Anna Twardosz	2,250

== Team events ==
The number of team events in the Grand Prix history

Total	Large	Normal	Winners	Competition
12	7	5	4	Mixed team
1	1	—	1	Men's super team

after L event in Klingenthal (26 October 2025)

=== Calendar ===
L – large hill
All	No.	Date	Place (Hill)	Size	Winner	Second	Third	R.
Men's super team
1	1	21 September 2025	(Italy) Val di Fiemme (Giuseppe Dal Ben HS143)	L _{001}	Poland Kamil Stoch; Dawid Kubacki	Japan Ren Nikaidō; Ryōyū Kobayashi	Slovenia Domen Prevc; Anže Lanišek	
Mixed team
12	1	26 October 2025	(Germany) Klingenthal (Vogtland Arena HS140)	L _{007}	Japan Nozomi Maruyama; Ren Nikaidō; Sara Takanashi; Ryōyū Kobayashi	Slovenia Nika Vodan; Anže Lanišek; Nika Prevc; Domen Prevc	Norway Anna Odine Strøm; Kristoffer Eriksen Sundal; Heidi Dyhre Traaserud; Halvor Egner Granerud	

== See also ==
- 2025–26 FIS Ski Jumping World Cup
- 2025–26 FIS Ski Flying World Cup
- 2025–26 FIS Ski Jumping Continental Cup (men)
- 2025–26 FIS Ski Jumping Inter-Continental Cup (women)
