= 2025–26 FIS Ski Jumping Inter-Continental Cup =

Ski-jumping competition series

2025–26 FIS Inter-Continental Cup
Winners
- Summer (Overall): (Switzerland) Sina Arnet
- Summer (Nations Cup): Japan
- Winter (Overall): (Slovenia) Teja Terbovšek (Germany) Julina Kreibich
- Winter (Nations Cup): Germany

Competitions
- Venues: 2 (Summer), 5 (Winter)
- Individual: 4 (Summer), 11 (Winter)

The 2025–26 FIS Ski Jumping Inter-Continental Cup, the women's second level competition, equaled men's Continental Cup and organized by the International Ski Federation (FIS) is current 3rd edition of the Women's Inter-Continental Cup – the second highest competition series of ski jumping for women, which was created as a result of combining two previous competitions – and succeeded the women's Continental Cup (2004/05) season and the FIS Cup (2012/13).

The season started on 13 September 2025 in Einseideln, Switzerland and ended on 15 March 2026 in Lahti, Finland. Swiss ski jumper Sina Arnet and Team Japan won the summer season.

Other competitive circuits this season will include the World Cup, Grand Prix, Continental Cup, FIS Cup, Alpen Cup and New Star Trophy.

== Women's Summer ==
Individual summer events in the ICC history

Total	L	N	Winners
18	6	12	11

after normal hill event in Hinterzarten (28 September 2025)

=== Calendar ===
N – normal hill / L – large hill
All	No.	Date	Place (Hill)	Size	Winner	Second	Third	Overall	R.
15	1	13 September 2025	(Switzerland) Einsiedeln (Schanzen Einsiedeln HS117)	L _{005}	(China) Zeng Ping	(Switzerland) Sina Arnet	(Japan) Yū Saitō	(China) Zeng Ping	
16	2	14 September 2025	(Switzerland) Einsiedeln (Schanzen Einsiedeln HS117)	L _{006}	(China) Zeng Ping	(Switzerland) Sina Arnet	(Japan) Yū Saitō	(China) Zeng Ping	
17	3	27 September 2025	(Germany) Hinterzarten (Adler Ski Stadium HS109)	N _{011}	(Japan) Nagomi Nakayama	(Switzerland) Sina Arnet	(Japan) Yū Saitō	(Switzerland) Sina Arnet	
18	4	28 September 2025	(Germany) Hinterzarten (Adler Ski Stadium HS109)	N _{012}	(Austria) Lisa Hirner	(Japan) Nagomi Nakayama	(Slovenia) Tinkara Komar	(Switzerland) Sina Arnet	
3rd FIS Summer Inter-Continental Cup Overall (13 – 28 September 2025)					(Switzerland) Sina Arnet	(Japan) Yū Saitō	(China) Zeng Ping	Summer Overall	

==== Overall ====
Rank	after 4 events	Points
	(Switzerland) Sina Arnet	265
2	(Japan) Yū Saitō	250
3	(China) Zeng Ping	200
4	(Japan) Nagomi Nakayama	180
5	(Austria) Lisa Hirner	150
6	(Austria) Julia Mühlbacher	95
7	(Finland) Minja Korhonen	95
8	(Ukraine) Karina Kozlova	91
9	(Japan) Saki Fujimoto	81
10	(Kazakhstan) Alyona Sviridenko	79

==== Nations Cup ====
Rank	after 4 events	Points
	Japan	647
2	Austria	370
3	Slovenia	356
4	Germany	341
5	Switzerland	318
6	Finland	207
7	China	200
8	France	103
9	Kazakhstan	102
10	Ukraine	91

== Women's Winter ==
Individual winter events in the ICC history

Total	L	N	Winners
28	10	18	12

after normal hill event in Nottoden (13 December 2025)

=== Calendar ===
N – normal hill / L – large hill
All	No.	Date	Place (Hill)	Size	Winner	Second	Third	Overall	R.
27	1	12 December 2025	(Norway) Nottoden (Tveitanbakken HS98)	N _{017}	(Slovenia) Teja Terbovšek	(Germany) Julina Kreibich	(Germany) Anne Häckel	(Slovenia) Teja Terbovšek	
28	2	13 December 2025	(Norway) Nottoden (Tveitanbakken HS98)	N _{018}	(Germany) Julina Kreibich	(Slovenia) Teja Terbovšek	(Slovenia) Ajda Košnjek	(Slovenia) Teja Terbovšek (Germany) Julina Kreibich	
29	3	23 January 2026	(Austria) Eisenerz (Bergiselschanze HS128)	N _{019}	(Slovenia)				
30	4	24 January 2026	(Austria) Eisenerz (Bergiselschanze HS128)	N _{020}					
32	6	31 January 2026	(Norway) Lillehammer (Lysgardsbakken HS140)	N _{019}					
33	7	1 February 2026	(Norway) Lillehammer (Lysgardsbakken HS140)	N _{020}					
34	8	14 February 2026	(Germany) Brotterode (Inselbergschanze HS117)	L _{014}					
35	9	15 February 2026	(Germany) Brotterode (Inselbergschanze HS117)	L _{015}					
36	10	14 March 2026	(Finland) Lahti (Salpausselkä HS130)	L _{016}					
37	11	15 March 2026	(Finland) Lahti (Salpausselkä HS130)	L _{017}					
3rd FIS Winter Inter-Continental Cup Overall (12 December 2025 – 15 March 2026)								Winter Overall	

==== Overall ====
Rank	after 2 of 11 events	Points
	(Slovenia) Teja Terbovšek	180
	(Germany) Julina Kreibich	180
3	(Germany) Anne Häckel	110
4	(Slovenia) Ajda Košnjek	86
5	(Slovenia) Taja Košir	77
6	(Germany) Lia Böhme	74
7	(Austria) Meghann Wadsak	68
8	(Germany) Hannah Wiegele	67
9	(Italy) Leonie Runggaldier	64
10	(Finland) Julia Äikiä	57

==== Nations Cup ====
Rank	after 2 of 11 events	Points
	Germany	467
2	Slovenia	385
3	Finland	160
4	Austria	152
5	Italy	95
6	France	53
7	Ukraine	31
8	Switzerland	30
9	United States	26
10	Czech Republic	24

== See also ==
- 2025–26 FIS Ski Jumping World Cup
- 2025 FIS Ski Jumping Grand Prix
- 2025–26 FIS Ski Jumping Continental Cup (men)
