= Song Qiwu =

Chinese ski jumper (born 2001)

Personal information
- Nationality: China
- Born: 20 August 2001 (age 24) Ziyang, China

Sport
- Sport: Skiing

Achievements and titles
- Personal bests: 131 m (430 ft); Zhangjiakou, 13 January 2026
- Updated on 12 February 2026

Song Qiwu (Chinese: 宋祺武; pinyin: Sòng Qíwǔ; born 20 August 2001) is a Chinese ski jumper. He competed both in the 2022 Winter Olympics and the 2026 Winter Olympics.

He competed at the 2022 Winter Olympics and placed 53rd in qualifying for the men's normal hill individual and did not advance, placed 55th in qualifying for the men's large hill individual and did not advance, and placed 10th with his team in the mixed team event.

At the 2026 Winter Olympics, he qualified for the men's normal hill individual and finished 31st after advancing to the second round of the competition, making him the first male Chinese ski jumper to do so at the Olympics. He was also part of the team that advanced to the second round in the mixed team event and finished 8th, making it the first time China made it to the top 8 in an Olympic team competition.

== Tournament Results ==
=== Summer Grand Prix ===
Season	1	2	3	4	5	6	7	Points
2026	Wisła	Wisła	Courchevel	Courchevel	Râșnov	Râșnov	Klingemthal	0
2026	57	q	61					0
