= Ski jumping at the 2024 Winter Youth Olympics – Men's individual normal hill =

Men's individual normal hill at the IV Winter Youth Olympic Games
- Venue: Alpensia Ski Jumping Centre
- Dates: 20 January
- Competitors: 39 from 21 nations
- Winning points: 214.0

Medalists
1st place, gold medalist(s)		Ilya Mizernykh	Kazakhstan
2nd place, silver medalist(s)		Niki Humml	Austria
3rd place, bronze medalist(s)		Łukasz Łukaszczyk	Poland

The men's individual normal hill event at the 2024 Winter Youth Olympics will be held on 20 January at the Alpensia Ski Jumping Centre.

== Results ==
The first round was started at 12:30 and the final round at 13:15.

Rank	Bib	Name	Country	Round 1			Final round			Total
Rank	Bib	Name	Country	Distance (m)	Points	Rank	Distance (m)	Points	Rank	Points
1st place, gold medalist(s)	24	Ilya Mizernykh	Kazakhstan	103.5	110.2	3	102.0	103.8	3	214.0
2nd place, silver medalist(s)	13	Niki Humml	Austria	98.0	98.2	8	106.0	112.5	1	210.7
3rd place, bronze medalist(s)	5	Łukasz Łukaszczyk	Poland	105.0	113.9	1	108.5	95.8	10	209.7
4	35	Felix Trunz	Switzerland	103.5	110.1	4	101.0	98.9	8	209.0
5	30	Kaimar Vagul	Estonia	99.5	102.9	5	102.5	105.8	2	208.7
6	34	Lukas Haagen	Austria	99.0	101.5	6	102.0	102.5	5	204.0
7	29	Kacper Tomasiak	Poland	104.5	112.5	2	95.0	90.5	12	203.0
8	37	Enej Faletič	Slovenia	96.0	98.0	9	102.0	103.0	4	201.0
9	10	Max Unglaube	Germany	98.5	97.1	10	101.0	100.8	7	197.9
10	32	Alex Reiter	Germany	96.5	94.1	11	99.0	98.4	9	192.5
11	22	Mats Strandbråten	Norway	94.0	89.2	12	100.5	102.3	6	191.5
12	15	Urban Šimnic	Slovenia	100.0	100.6	7	95.0	87.9	13	188.5
13	31	Daniel Škarka	Czech Republic	90.0	85.5	15	96.0	92.8	11	178.3
14	3	Maximilian Gartner	Italy	96.0	88.4	13	91.5	82.1	16	170.5
15	20	Eeli Keränen	Finland	90.5	81.8	17	92.0	82.8	15	164.6
16	9	Josef Buchar	Czech Republic	89.0	81.4	19	91.0	79.5	18	160.9
17	38	Jason Colby	United States	91.0	81.9	16	87.0	73.1	19	155.0
18	17	Sébastien Woodbridge	France	87.0	71.5	23	92.0	80.5	17	152.0
19	25	Hektor Kapustík	Slovakia	82.5	63.7	29	93.5	85.1	14	148.8
20	4	Oddvar Gunnerød	Norway	94.5	86.9	14	83.5	57.9	30	144.8
21	12	Yang Seung-chan	South Korea	87.5	73.9	22	87.0	70.7	21	144.6
22	21	Martino Zambenedetti	Italy	83.0	67.1	25	86.5	71.6	20	138.7
23	26	Jang Sun-woong	South Korea	84.5	67.7	24	85.0	70.5	23	138.2
24	36	Seigo Sasaki	Japan	88.5	76.8	21	82.5	60.9	27	137.7
25	39	Mathéo Vernier	France	82.5	63.8	28	88.0	70.7	21	134.5
26	6	Takuma Mikami	Japan	82.5	65.0	27	85.0	67.9	24	132.9
27	1	Ren Haoran	China	91.5	77.9	20	77.5	52.2	31	130.1
28	18	Mykola Smyk	Ukraine	83.5	65.1	26	84.5	64.7	26	129.8
29	28	Zheng Pengbo	China	90.5	81.7	18	76.5	46.2	36	127.9
30	8	Ilya Shilnikov	Kazakhstan	81.0	59.6	30	84.0	64.8	25	124.4
31	27	Vasyl Bukhonko	Ukraine	79.5	55.7	31	81.5	58.7	29	114.4
32	14	Sawyer Graves	United States	72.5	44.4	35	82.5	59.5	28	103.9
33	16	Tarik VanWieren	Canada	75.0	50.9	32	77.0	47.2	35	98.1
34	7	Juho Ojala	Finland	74.0	44.8	33	76.5	49.2	33	94.0
35	33	Cosmin Florin Donciu	Romania	73.0	44.6	34	78.5	48.9	34	93.5
36	23	Giorgi Diakonovi	Georgia	63.5	23.6	39	77.5	49.3	32	72.9
37	11	Lars Künzle	Switzerland	67.5	38.2	36	68.5	32.9	37	71.1
38	19	Radu Borca	Romania	64.5	26.7	38	65.0	23.7	38	50.4
39	2	Jakub Karkalík	Slovakia	69.5	35.0	37	60.0	8.4	39	43.4
