= Ski jumping at the 2026 Winter Olympics =

Ski jumping at the XXV Olympic Winter Games
- Ski jumping pictogram
- Venue: Predazzo Ski Jumping Stadium
- Dates: 7–16 February 2026
- No. of events: 6 (3 men, 2 women, 1 mixed)
- Competitors: 101 from 22 nations

Ski jumping at the 2026 Winter Olympics was held at the Predazzo Ski Jumping Stadium in Predazzo, Italy. The events were held between 7 and 16 February 2026.

With the introduction of the women's large hill individual event, the ski jumping program now features three men's, two women's and one mixed team event.

== Competition schedule ==
The following will be the competition schedule for the six ski jumping events.

All times are (UTC+1).

| Date | Time | Event |
|---|---|---|
| 7 February | 18:45 | Women's normal hill individual |
| 9 February | 19:00 | Men's normal hill individual |
| 10 February | 18:45 | Mixed team normal hill |
| 14 February | 18:45 | Men's large hill individual |
| 15 February | 18:45 | Women's large hill individual |
| 16 February | 19:00 | Men's large hill super team |

== Participating nations ==
A total of 101 athletes from 22 nations qualified to participate.

- Austria (8)
- Bulgaria (1)
- Canada (4)
- China (6)
- Czech Republic (4)
- Estonia (2)
- Finland (7)
- France (5)
- Germany (8)
- Italy (7)
- Japan (7)
- Kazakhstan (2)
- Norway (7)
- Poland (5)
- Romania (4)
- Slovakia (2)
- Slovenia (7)
- Sweden (1)
- Switzerland (4)
- Turkey (2)
- Ukraine (2)
- United States (6)

== Medal summary ==
=== Medal table ===
| Rank | Nation | Gold | Silver | Bronze | Total |
|---|---|---|---|---|---|
| 1 | Norway | 2 | 2 | 1 | 5 |
| 2 | Slovenia | 2 | 1 | 1 | 4 |
| 3 | Austria | 1 | 0 | 0 | 1 |
| 3 | Germany | 1 | 0 | 0 | 1 |
| 5 | Poland | 0 | 2 | 1 | 3 |
| 6 | Japan | 0 | 1 | 3 | 4 |
| 7 | Switzerland | 0 | 0 | 1 | 1 |
| Totals (7 entries) | | 6 | 6 | 7 | 19 |

=== Medalists ===
| Event | Gold | | Silver | | Bronze | |
|---|---|---|---|---|---|---|
| Men's normal hill individual | Philipp Raimund; Germany | 274.1 | Kacper Tomasiak; Poland | 270.7 | Ren Nikaidō; Japan Gregor Deschwanden; Switzerland | 266.0 |
| Men's large hill individual | Domen Prevc; Slovenia | 301.8 | Ren Nikaidō; Japan | 295.0 | Kacper Tomasiak; Poland | 291.2 |
| Men's large hill super team | Austria; Jan Hörl; Stephan Embacher | 568.7 | Poland; Paweł Wąsek; Kacper Tomasiak | 547.3 | Norway; Johann André Forfang; Kristoffer Eriksen Sundal | 538.0 |
| Women's normal hill individual | Anna Odine Strøm; Norway | 267.3 | Nika Prevc; Slovenia | 266.2 | Nozomi Maruyama; Japan | 261.8 |
| Women's large hill individual | Anna Odine Strøm; Norway | 284.8 | Eirin Maria Kvandal; Norway | 282.7 | Nika Prevc; Slovenia | 271.5 |
| Mixed normal hill team | Slovenia; Nika Vodan; Anže Lanišek; Nika Prevc; Domen Prevc | 1069.2 | Norway; Anna Odine Strøm; Kristoffer Eriksen Sundal; Eirin Maria Kvandal; Marius Lindvik | 1038.3 | Japan; Nozomi Maruyama; Ryōyū Kobayashi; Sara Takanashi; Ren Nikaidō | 1034.0 |
