= Robin Pedersen =

Norwegian ski jumper (born 1996)

Personal information
- Nationality: Norway
- Born: 31 August 1996 (age 29) Oslo, Norway

Sport
- Sport: Skiing
- Club: Stalkameratene IL

World Cup career
- Seasons: 2018–2020, 2022
- Indiv. starts: 47
- Indiv. podiums: 1
- Team starts: 3
- Team podiums: 1
- Team wins: 1

Achievements and titles
- Personal bests: 225.0 m (738.2 ft); Tauplitz/Bad Mitterndorf, 15 February 2020
Medal record
Men's ski jumping
Representing Norway
World Championships
Bronze medal – third place	2025 Trondheim	Team LH
Junior World Championships
Silver medal – second place	2016 Râșnov	Team NH
- Updated on 6 January 2024

Robin Mattias Johannes Pedersen (born 31 August 1996) is a Norwegian ski jumper.

At the 2016 Junior World Championships he won a silver medal in the team competition and placed 22nd in the normal hill. He made his Continental Cup debut in December 2015 in Rovaniemi, recording his first podiums in December 2018 in Lillehammer with a third place before managing back-to-back victories the next week in Ruka.

He made his FIS Ski Jumping World Cup debut in March 2018 at the Holmenkollen ski festival. He collected his first World Cup points with a 30th place on New Years' Day 2019, later breaking the top 20 with an 18th place in Bischofshofen, both as part of the 2018-19 Four Hills Tournament where he finished 33rd overall.

He represents the sports club IL Stålkameratene. He is a son of ski jumper and national team coach Trond Jøran Pedersen.
