= Anna Twardosz =

Polish ski jumper (born 2001)

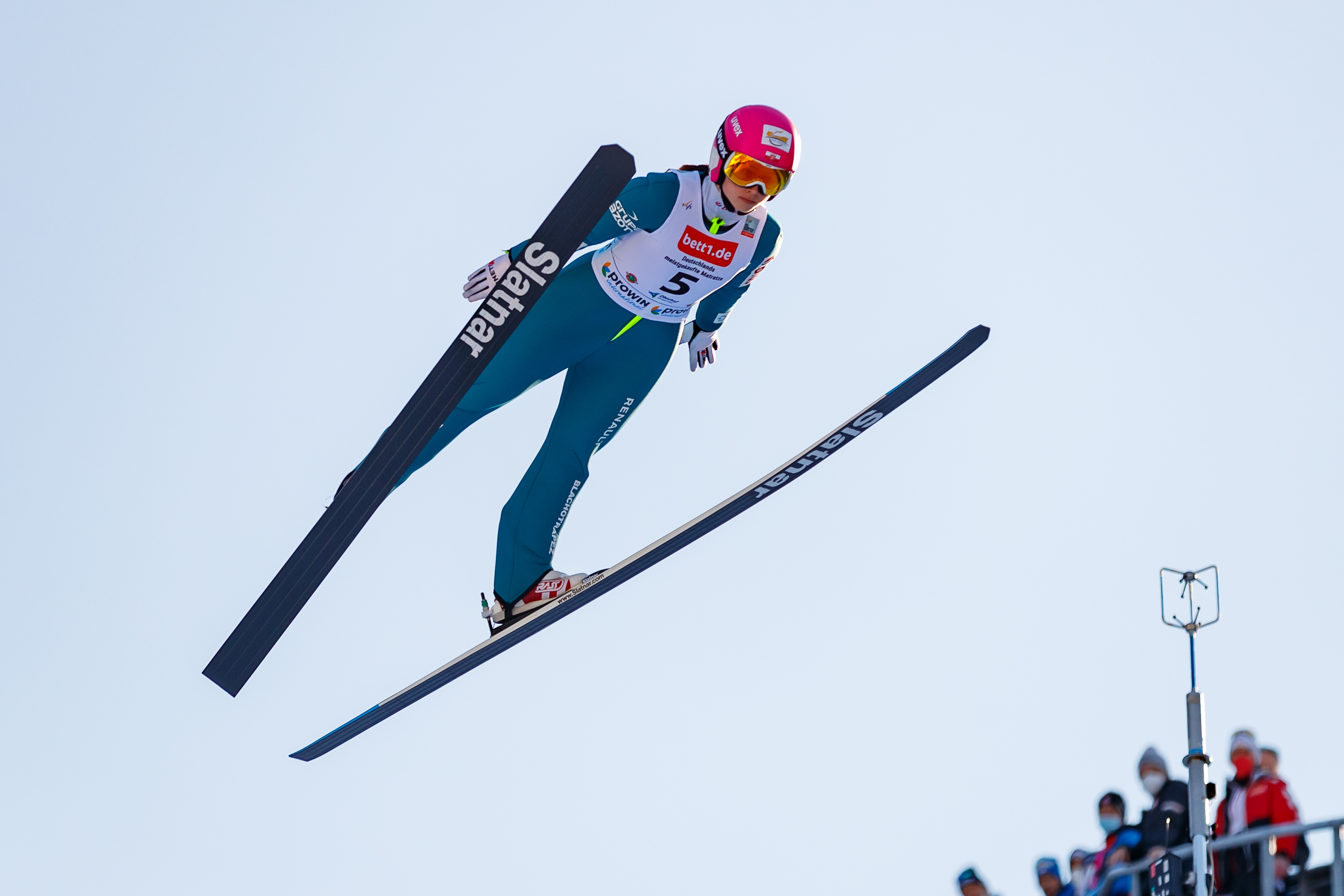
- Twardosz in 2022

Personal information
- Born: 12 April 2001 (age 25) Sucha Beskidzka, Poland

Sport
- Sport: Ski jumping
Medal record
Women's ski jumping
Representing Poland
Winter Universiade
Silver medal – second place	2023 Lake Placid	Team NH

Anna Twardosz (born 12 April 2001) is a Polish ski jumper.

== Career ==
Twardosz competed at the 2023 Winter World University Games and won a silver medal in the team normal hill event.

During the 2025 FIS Ski Jumping Grand Prix on 13 September 2025, she became the first Polish woman to podium at a top-level ski jumping competition. She represented Poland at the 2026 Winter Olympics in the individual normal hill and finished in tenth place.

== Personal life ==
After the Polish Ski Federation withdrew financial support for female ski jumpers with a body mass index (BMI) over 21 in 2022, Twardosz spoke publicly about suffering from bulimia nervosa and depression.
