= Domen Prevc =

Slovenian ski jumper (born 1999)

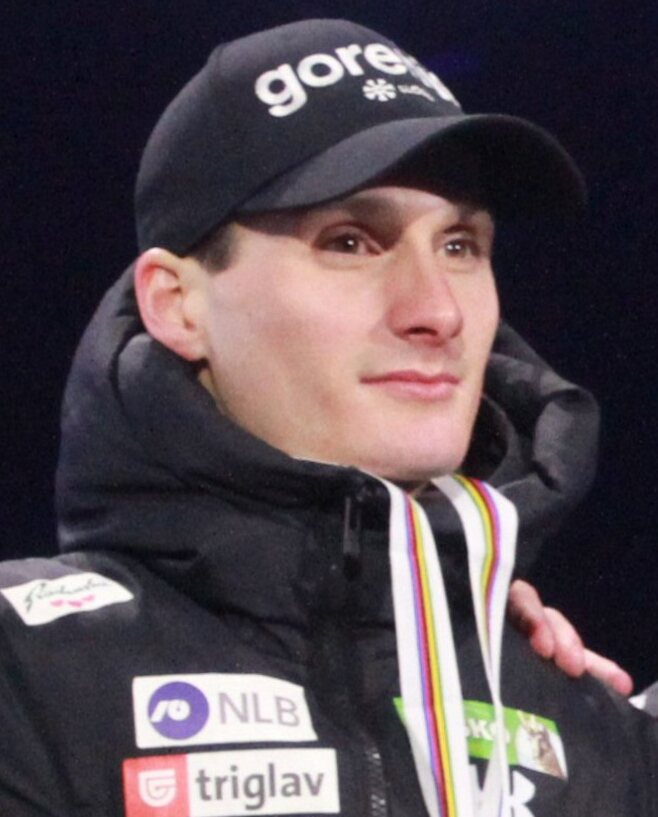
- Prevc in 2025

Personal information
- Born: 4 June 1999 (age 27) Kranj, Slovenia
- Height: 1.77 m (5 ft 10 in)

Sport
- Sport: Ski jumping
- Club: SK Triglav Kranj

World Cup career
- Seasons: 2016–present
- Indiv. starts: 237
- Indiv. podiums: 42
- Indiv. wins: 23
- Team starts: 33
- Team podiums: 18
- Team wins: 4
- Overall titles: 1 (2026)
- Four Hills titles: 1 (2026)
- Ski Flying titles: 2 (2025, 2026)

Achievements and titles
- Personal bests: 254.5 m (835 ft); Planica, 30 March 2025
Medal record
Representing Slovenia
Men's ski jumping
Olympic Games
Gold medal – first place	2026 Milano Cortina	Individual LH
Gold medal – first place	2026 Milano Cortina	Mixed team NH
World Championships
Gold medal – first place	2025 Trondheim	Individual LH
Gold medal – first place	2025 Trondheim	Team LH
Silver medal – second place	2025 Trondheim	Mixed team LH
Men's ski flying
World Championships
Gold medal – first place	2022 Vikersund	Team
Gold medal – first place	2024 Bad Mitterndorf	Team
Gold medal – first place	2026 Oberstdorf	Individual
Silver medal – second place	2018 Oberstdorf	Team
- Updated on 22 November 2026

Domen Prevc (born 4 June 1999) is a Slovenian ski jumper. He is one of the most successful ski jumpers of all time, with two gold medals at the Winter Olympics, two gold medals at the Nordic World Ski Championships, and three gold medals at the Ski Flying World Championships. He also won the overall World Cup title in the 2025–26 season, Ski Flying World Cup titles in 2025 and 2026, and the Four Hills Tournament in the 2025–26 season.

Prevc is one of only two ski jumpers – the other being Matti Nykänen – to have won all five major titles in ski jumping (Olympic individual gold, World Championship individual gold in both ski jumping and ski flying, the Four Hills Tournament, and the overall World Cup title). He is also the current world record holder for the longest official ski jump, landing at 254.5 metres (835 ft) in Planica on 30 March 2025.

== Career ==
=== 2015: World Cup debut ===
Prevc competed in the 2015 European Youth Olympic Winter Festival. He made his individual World Cup debut on 22 November 2015 in Klingenthal with eighth place. He needed only four World Cup starts to reach his first podium on 19 December in Engelberg where he took second place. At that event, Domen and his brother Peter shared a podium as the first brothers in the history of the World Cup.

=== 2016: First win and yellow bib ===
Prevc won his first World Cup individual event on 25 November 2016 at the 2016–17 season opening in Ruka, and therefore wore the yellow bib as the World Cup overall leader for the first time in his career. Shortly after, in December, he won three more World Cup individual events in Klingenthal, Lillehammer and Engelberg.

=== 2017: Ski flying debut ===
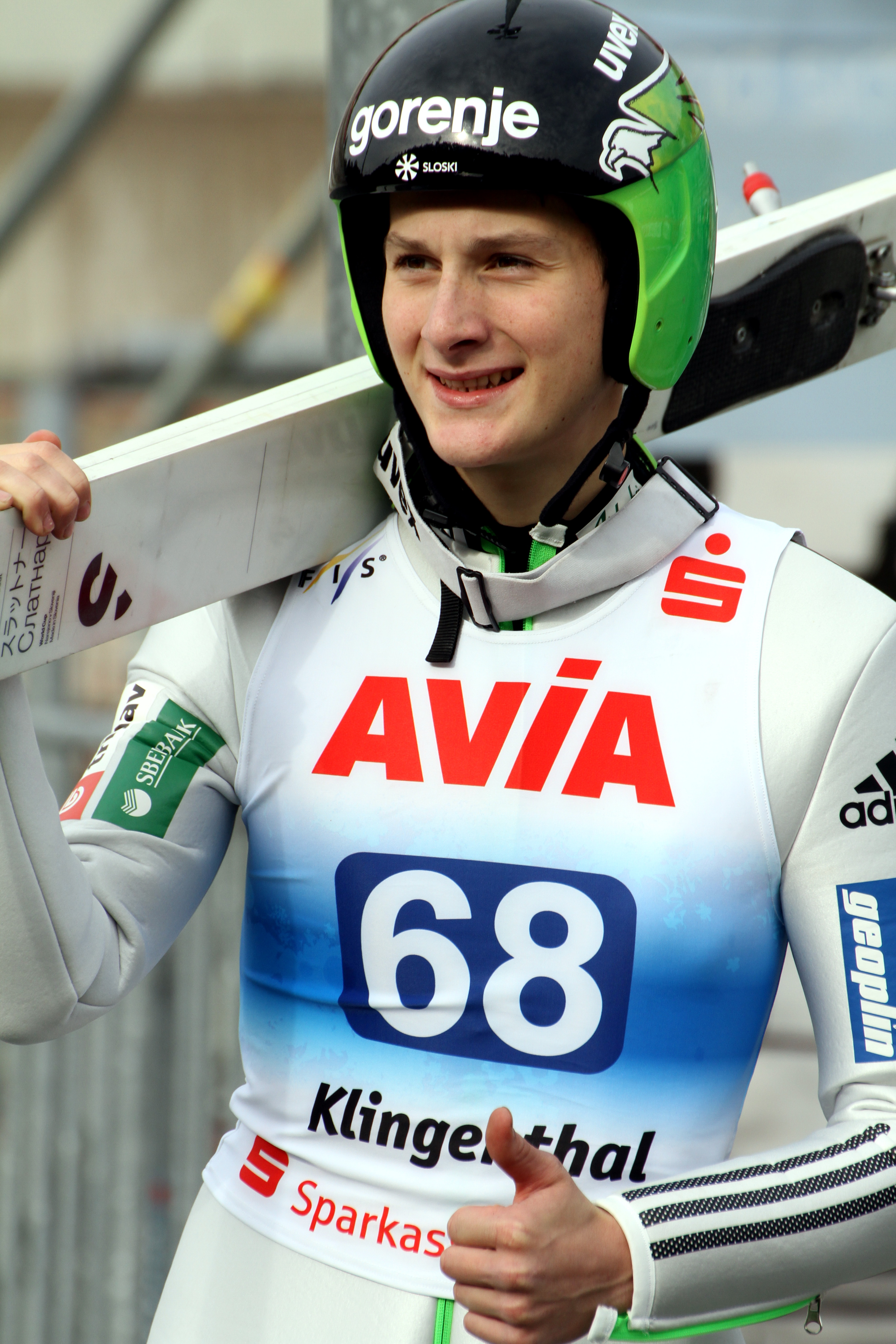
Prevc in 2017

On 28 January 2017 in Willingen, together with his brothers Cene and Peter, he represented the Slovenia national team in the team event of the World Cup. It was the first time in history that three brothers were on the same team in a World Cup ski jumping competition.

Despite his age, he competed at the ski flying event for the first time in his career in Oberstdorf on 3 February. On 19 March in Vikersund, he improved his personal best jump to 243.5 metres (799 ft).

== Personal life ==
Prevc was born in Kranj to Božidar and Julijana Prevc; the family has since been living in the village of Dolenja Vas. He has two brothers and two sisters. Both of his brothers, Peter and Cene, and one of his sisters, Nika, are also ski jumpers. His youngest sister, Ema, does not ski jump, and instead practices ballet. His father, who owns a furniture business, is also an international ski jumping referee. His mother is a librarian.

== Major tournament results ==
=== Winter Olympics ===
Year	Individual		Team	
Year	Normal	Large	Super	Mixed
(Italy) 2026 Milano Cortina	6	1	5	1

=== FIS Nordic World Ski Championships ===
Year	Individual		Team	
Year	Normal	Large	Men	Mixed
(Finland) 2017 Lahti	34	—	—	—
(Germany) 2021 Oberstdorf	—	—	5	—
(Slovenia) 2023 Planica	—	21	—	—
(Norway) 2025 Trondheim	18	1	1	2

=== FIS Ski Flying World Championships ===
Year	Individual	Team
(Germany) 2018 Oberstdorf	21	2
(Slovenia) 2020 Planica	21	4
(Norway) 2022 Vikersund	6	1
(Austria) 2024 Bad Mitterndorf	14	1
(Germany) 2026 Oberstdorf	1	6

== World Cup results ==
=== Standings ===
Season	Overall	4H	SF	RA
2015–16	14	17	—	N/A
2016–17	6	9	9	24
2017–18	33	37	13	44
2018–19	13	—	4	18
2019–20	19	7	9	38
2020–21	22	29	5	N/A
2021–22	44	—	17	44
2022–23	18	29	5	18
2023–24	13	31	5	10
2024–25	10	21	1st place, gold medalist(s)	2nd place, silver medalist(s)
2025–26	1st place, gold medalist(s)	1st place, gold medalist(s)	1st place, gold medalist(s)	N/A

=== Individual wins ===
No.	Season	Date	Location	Hill	Size
1	2016–17	25 November 2016	(Finland) Ruka	Rukatunturi HS142	LH
2	2016–17	4 December 2016	(Germany) Klingenthal	Vogtland Arena HS140	LH
3	2016–17	10 December 2016	(Norway) Lillehammer	Lysgårdsbakken HS138	LH
4	2016–17	18 December 2016	(Switzerland) Engelberg	Gross-Titlis-Schanze HS140	LH
5	2018–19	17 March 2019	(Norway) Vikersund	Vikersundbakken HS240	FH
6	2023–24	18 February 2024	(Japan) Sapporo	Ōkurayama HS137	LH
7	2024–25	26 January 2025	(Germany) Oberstdorf	Heini-Klopfer-Skiflugschanze HS235	FH
8	2024–25	16 March 2025	(Norway) Vikersund	Vikersundbakken HS240	FH
9	2024–25	28 March 2025	(Slovenia) Planica	Letalnica bratov Gorišek HS240	FH
10	2025–26	6 December 2025	(Poland) Wisła	Malinka HS134	LH
11	2025–26	7 December 2025	(Poland) Wisła	Malinka HS134	LH
12	2025–26	13 December 2025	(Germany) Klingenthal	Vogtland Arena HS140	LH
13	2025–26	14 December 2025	(Germany) Klingenthal	Vogtland Arena HS140	LH
14	2025–26	20 December 2025	(Switzerland) Engelberg	Gross-Titlis-Schanze HS140	LH
15	2025–26	29 December 2025	(Germany) Oberstdorf	Schattenbergschanze HS137	LH
16	2025–26	1 January 2026	(Germany) Garmisch-Partenkirchen	Große Olympiaschanze HS142	LH
17	2025–26	17 January 2026	(Japan) Sapporo	Ōkurayama HS137	LH
18	2025–26	18 January 2026	(Japan) Sapporo	Ōkurayama HS137	LH
19	2025–26	31 January 2026	(Germany) Willingen	Mühlenkopfschanze HS147	LH
20	2025–26	1 February 2026	(Germany) Willingen	Mühlenkopfschanze HS147	LH
21	2025–26	28 February 2026	(Austria) Bad Mitterndorf	Kulm HS235	FH
22	2025–26	1 March 2026	(Austria) Bad Mitterndorf	Kulm HS235	FH
23	2025–26	27 March 2026	(Slovenia) Planica	Letalnica bratov Gorišek HS240	FH

=== Individual starts ===
winner (1); second (2); third (3); did not compete (–); failed to qualify (q); disqualified (DQ)
Season	1	2	3	4	5	6	7	8	9	10	11	12	13	14	15	16	17	18	19	20	21	22	23	24	25	26	27	28	29	30	31	32	Points
2015–16	Klingenthal	Lillehammer	Lillehammer	Nizhny Tagil	Nizhny Tagil	Engelberg	Engelberg	Oberstdorf	Garmisch-Partenkirchen	Innsbruck	Bischofshofen	Willingen	Zakopane	Sapporo	Sapporo	Trondheim	Vikersund	Vikersund	Vikersund	Lahti	Lahti	Kuopio	Almaty	Almaty	Wisła	Titisee-Neustadt	Planica	Planica	Planica				486
2015–16	8	8	12	–	–	2	5	27	18	23	6	38	9	2	10	29	–	–	–	29	15	–	–	–	26	4	–	–	–				486
2016–17	Ruka	Ruka	Klingenthal	Lillehammer	Lillehammer	Engelberg	Engelberg	Oberstdorf	Garmisch-Partenkirchen	Innsbruck	Bischofshofen	Wisła	Wisła	Zakopane	Willingen	Oberstdorf	Oberstdorf	Sapporo	Sapporo	Pyeongchang	Pyeongchang	Oslo	Trondheim	Vikersund	Planica	Planica							963
2016–17	1	13	1	1	6	2	1	26	5	25	4	5	3	9	25	5	7	50	20	17	24	–	24	8	20	17							963
2017–18	Wisła	Ruka	Nizhny Tagil	Nizhny Tagil	Titisee-Neustadt	Engelberg	Engelberg	Oberstdorf	Garmisch-Partenkirchen	Innsbruck	Bischofshofen	Tauplitz	Zakopane	Willingen	Willingen	Lahti	Oslo	Lillehammer	Trondheim	Vikersund	Planica	Planica											81
2017–18	–	–	–	–	–	29	28	–	41	44	29	11	35	–	–	49	–	–	–	4	q	–											81
2018–19	Wisła	Ruka	Ruka	Nizhny Tagil	Nizhny Tagil	Engelberg	Engelberg	Oberstdorf	Garmisch-Partenkirchen	Innsbruck	Bischofshofen	Val di Fiemme	Val di Fiemme	Zakopane	Sapporo	Sapporo	Oberstdorf	Oberstdorf	Oberstdorf	Lahti	Willingen	Willingen	Oslo	Lillehammer	Trondheim	Vikersund	Planica	Planica					542
2018–19	–	4	4	14	14	20	18	q	q	–	–	–	–	23	24	13	20	13	16	–	39	32	6	7	q	1	5	2					542
2019–20	Wisła	Ruka	Nizhny Tagil	Nizhny Tagil	Klingenthal	Engelberg	Engelberg	Oberstdorf	Garmisch-Partenkirchen	Innsbruck	Bischofshofen	Val di Fiemme	Val di Fiemme	Titisee-Neustadt	Titisee-Neustadt	Zakopane	Sapporo	Sapporo	Willingen	Tauplitz	Tauplitz	Râșnov	Râșnov	Lahti	Lahti	Oslo	Lillehammer						361
2019–20	23	11	37	40	30	13	19	9	17	10	9	13	14	20	27	22	4	23	14	25	5	–	–	27	26	50	37						361
2020–21	Wisła	Ruka	Ruka	Nizhny Tagil	Nizhny Tagil	Engelberg	Engelberg	Oberstdorf	Garmisch-Partenkirchen	Innsbruck	Bischofshofen	Titisee-Neustadt	Titisee-Neustadt	Zakopane	Lahti	Willingen	Willingen	Klingenthal	Klingenthal	Szczyrk	Szczyrk	Râșnov	Planica	Planica	Planica								241
2020–21	–	–	–	–	–	32	17	12	37	30	38	40	42	8	30	–	–	22	30	17	16	–	8	4	4								241
2021–22	Nizhny Tagil	Nizhny Tagil	Ruka	Ruka	Wisła	Klingenthal	Klingenthal	Engelberg	Engelberg	Oberstdorf	Garmisch-Partenkirchen	Bischofshofen	Bischofshofen	Bischofshofen	Zakopane	Titisee-Neustadt	Titisee-Neustadt	Willingen	Willingen	Lahti	Lahti	Lillehammer	Oslo	Oslo	Oberstdorf	Oberstdorf	Planica	Planica					60
2021–22	q	q	–	–	DQ	42	q	q	47	–	–	–	–	–	–	–	–	–	–	–	–	–	45	24	27	18	7	–					60
2022–23	Wisła	Wisła	Ruka	Ruka	Titisee-Neustadt	Titisee-Neustadt	Engelberg	Engelberg	Oberstdorf	Garmisch-Partenkirchen	Innsbruck	Bischofshofen	Zakopane	Sapporo	Sapporo	Sapporo	Tauplitz	Tauplitz	Willingen	Willingen	Lake Placid	Lake Placid	Râșnov	Oslo	Oslo	Lillehammer	Lillehammer	Vikersund	Vikersund	Lahti	Planica	Planica	449
2022–23	48	18	23	29	q	34	16	21	39	29	24	39	35	40	35	4	3	12	24	6	6	35	–	23	31	21	48	7	5	39	11	4	449
2023–24	Ruka	Ruka	Lillehammer	Lillehammer	Klingenthal	Klingenthal	Engelberg	Engelberg	Oberstdorf	Garmisch-Partenkirchen	Innsbruck	Bischofshofen	Wisła	Zakopane	Willingen	Willingen	Lake Placid, New York	Lake Placid, New York	Sapporo	Sapporo	Oberstdorf	Oberstdorf	Lahti	Lahti	Oslo	Oslo	Trondheim	Trondheim	Vikersund	Vikersund	Planica	Planica	663
2023–24	17	16	q	27	17	14	15	24	22	q	23	31	–	31	5	33	19	12	19	1	5	10	13	30	10	4	35	39	3	5	17	2	663
2024–25	Lillehammer	Lillehammer	Ruka	Ruka	Wisła	Wisła	Titisee-Neustadt	Titisee-Neustadt	Engelberg	Engelberg	Oberstdorf	Garmisch-Partenkirchen	Innsbruck	Bischofshofen	Zakopane	Oberstdorf	Oberstdorf	Willingen	Willingen	Lake Placid	Lake Placid	Sapporo	Sapporo	Oslo	Vikersund	Vikersund	Lahti	Planica	Planica				776
2024–25	q	q	15	46	q	DQ	44	22	38	46	32	24	9	19	23	3	1	31	13	14	8	3	8	5	5	1	28	1	2				776
2025–26	Lillehammer	Lillehammer	Falun	Falun	Ruka	Wisła	Wisła	Klingenthal	Klingenthal	Engelberg	Engelberg	Oberstdorf	Garmisch-Partenkirchen	Innsbruck	Bischofshofen	Zakopane	Sapporo	Sapporo	Willingen	Willingen	Bad Mitterndorf	Bad Mitterndorf	Lahti	Lahti	Oslo	Oslo	Vikersund	Planica	Planica				2,148
2025–26	4	2	13	3	3	1	1	1	1	1	2	1	1	2	2	27	1	1	1	1	1	1	DQ	2	42	9	5	1	2				2,148
2026–27	Lillehammer	Lillehammer	Ruka	Ruka	Wisła	Wisła	Titisee-Neustadt	Titisee-Neustadt	Engelberg	Engelberg	Oberstdorf	Garmisch-Partenkirchen	Innsbruck	Bischofshofen	Zakopane	Sapporo	Sapporo	Willingen	Willingen	Lake Placid	Lahti	Vikersund	Vikersund	Oslo	Oslo	Planica	Planica						32
2026–27	50	8																															32

Records
Preceded by Stefan Kraft; 253.5 m (832 ft)	World's longest ski jump 254.5 m (835 ft); 30 March 2025 – present	Succeeded by Incumbent
Olympic Games
Preceded by Ilka Štuhec and Rok Marguč	Flagbearer for Slovenia; Milano Cortina 2026	Succeeded by Incumbent
