= Felix Hoffmann (ski jumper) =

German ski jumper (born 1997)

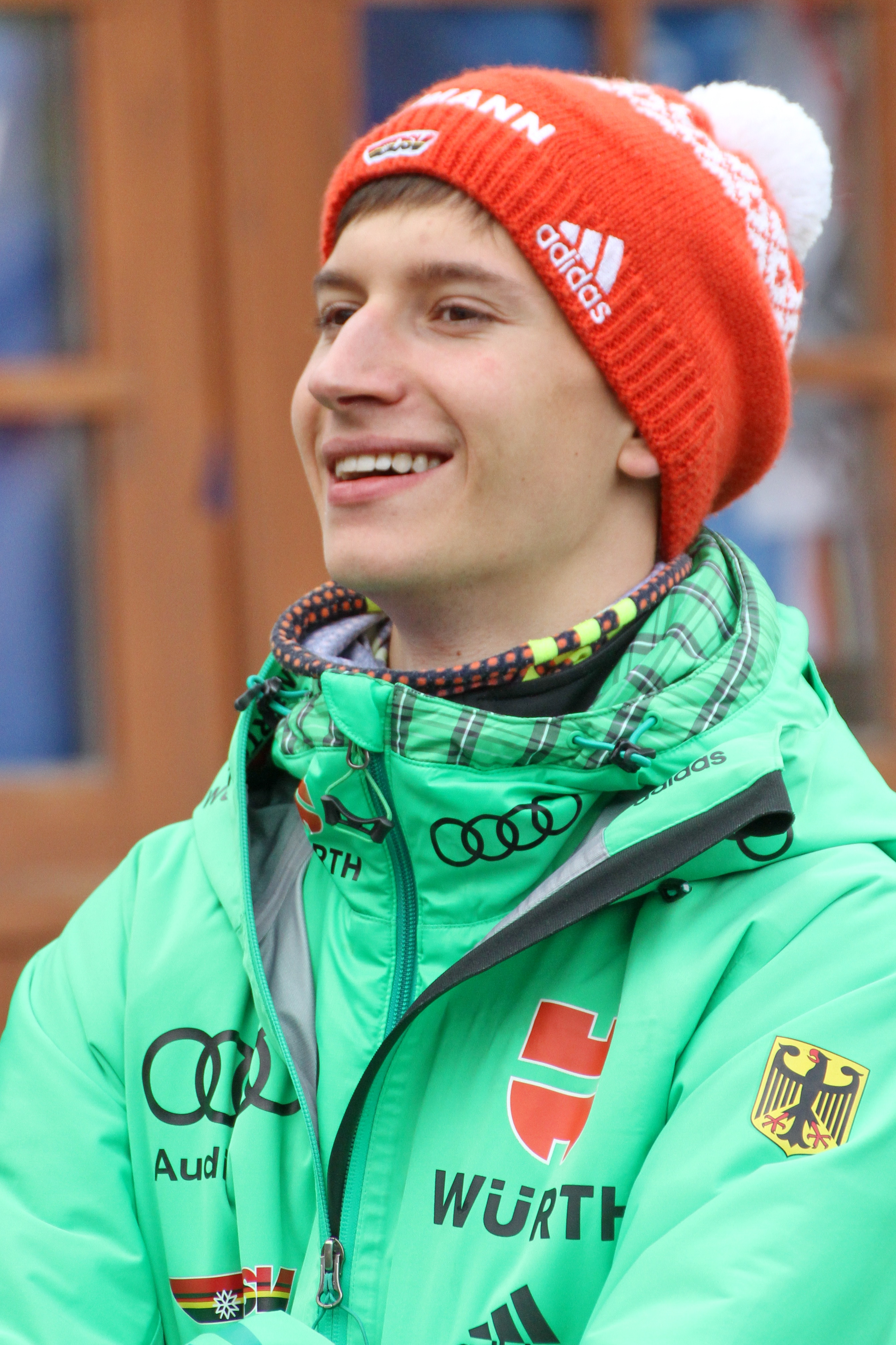
- Hoffmann in 2017

Personal information
- Born: 14 October 1997 (age 28) Suhl, Germany
- Height: 1.70 m (5 ft 7 in)

Sport
- Country: Germany
- Sport: Skiing
- Club: SWV Goldlauter

World Cup career
- Indiv. podiums: 4
- Indiv. wins: 0

Achievements and titles
- Personal bests: 235.0 metres (771.0 ft) (Planica, 2023)
Medal record
Ski jumping
Representing Germany
World Junior Championships
Silver medal – second place	2017 Park City	Team normal hill

Felix Hoffmann (born 14 October 1997) is a German ski jumper.

His FIS Ski Jumping World Cup took place in December 2018 in Oberstdorf. As of 2025, he had four individual World Cup podiums.

== Record ==
=== FIS Ski Flying World Championships ===
Event	Individual	Team
(Germany) 2026 Oberstdorf	22	4
