= Gregor Deschwanden =

Swiss ski jumper (born 1991)

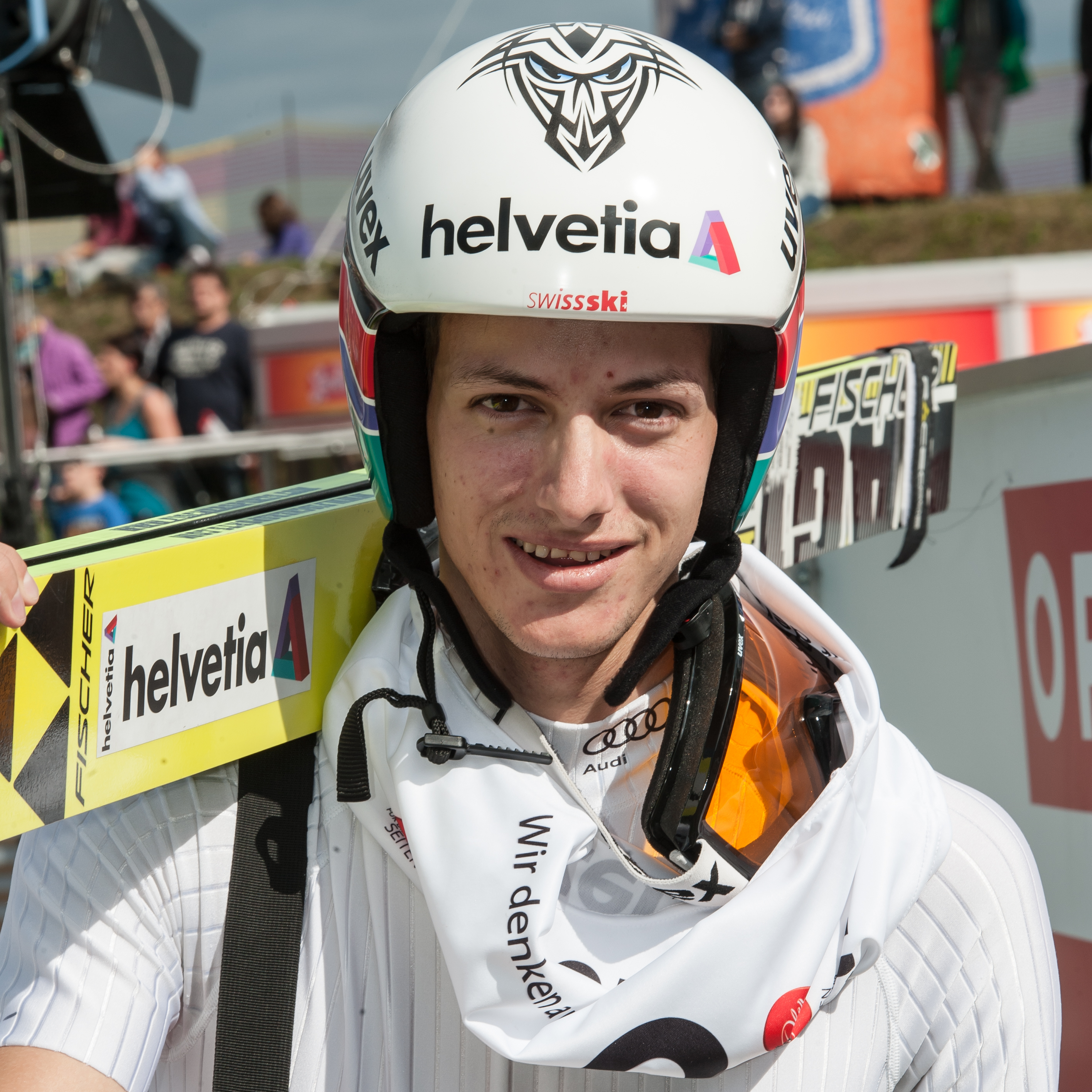
- Deschwanden in 2015

Personal information
- Born: 27 February 1991 (age 35) Horw, Switzerland

Sport
- Sport: Ski jumping
- Club: SC Horw

World Cup career
- Indiv. starts: 314
- Indiv. podiums: 7
- Indiv. wins: 1
- Team starts: 54

Achievements and titles
- Personal bests: 235.5 m (773 ft); Kulm, 27 January 2024
Medal record
Men's ski jumping
Representing Switzerland
Olympic Games
Bronze medal – third place	2026 Milano Cortina	Individual NH
- Updated on 29 March 2026

Gregor Deschwanden (born 27 February 1991) is a Swiss ski jumper.

== Career ==
His best individual World Cup showing so far is one win in an individual large hill in Holmenkollen in 2026.

Deschwanden represents Switzerland at Winter Olympics, being a bronze medalist in the Men's singles normal hill at the 2026 Milano Cortina Olympics.

He also competed at the 2014 Sochi Olympics, where he placed 25th in the men's individual normal hill and 15th in the men's individual large hill competitions.

== Major tournament results ==
=== Winter Olympics ===
Year	Place	Individual		Team		
Year	Place	Normal	Large	Men	Super	Mixed
2014	(Russia) Sochi	25	14	—	N/A	N/A
2018	(South Korea) Pyeongchang	29	36	—	N/A	N/A
2022	(China) Beijing	17	22	8	N/A	—
2026	(Italy) Milan / Cortina d'Ampezzo	3	13	N/A	7	—

=== FIS Nordic World Ski Championships ===
Year	Place	Individual		Team	
Year	Place	Normal	Large	Men	Mixed
2013	(Italy) Val di Fiemme	41	43	10	—
2015	(Sweden) Falun	14	17	10	—
2017	(Finland) Lahti	33	35	10	—
2021	(Germany) Oberstdorf	24	20	7	—
2023	(Slovenia) Planica	19	24	7	6
2025	(Norway) Trondheim	14	7	9	11

=== FIS Ski Flying World Championships ===
Year	Place	Individual	Team
2014	(Czech Republic) Harrachov	23	N/A
2016	(Austria) Bad Mitterndorf	30	—
2018	(Germany) Oberstdorf	34	6
2020	(Slovenia) Planica	—	4
2022	(Norway) Vikersund	24	—
2024	(Austria) Bad Mitterndorf	17	6
2026	(Germany) Oberstdorf	30	6

== World Cup ==
=== Standings ===
Season	Overall	4H	SF	RA
2011/12	—	—	—	N/A
2012/13	44	41	40	N/A
2013/14	32	36	31	N/A
2014/15	27	34	32	N/A
2015/16	39	47	—	N/A
2016/17	64	—	—	37
2017/18	38	30	—	38
2018/19	67	—	—	
2019/20	51	48	—	54
2020/21	26	20	35	N/A
2021/22	26	14	40	24
2022/23	26	28	12	12
2023/24	18	23	24	8
2024/25	6	5	9	9
2025/26	19	21	16	N/A

=== Individual wins ===
No.	Season	Date	Location	Hill	Size
1	2025–26	14 March 2026	(Norway) Oslo	Holmenkollbakken HS134	LH
