= 2022–23 FIS Cup (ski jumping) =

FIS Cup 2022/23
Discipline	Men	Women
Overall	(Austria) Maximilian Lienher	(Germany) Juliane Seyfarth

Competition
Edition	18th	11th
Locations	8	5
Individual	20	14

The 2022/23 FIS Cup (ski jumping) was the 18th FIS Cup season in ski jumping for men and the 11th for women.

Other competitive circuits this season include the World Cup, Grand Prix, Continental Cup, Alpen Cup and New Star Trophy.

Francisco Mörth from Austria and Sina Arnet from Switzerland were the defending overall champions from the 2021–22 season.

This season was the last time the FIS Cup competition for women was held. From the 2023–24 season, it was merged with the Continental Cup and transformed into the Women's Intercontinental Cup.

== Men ==
=== Calendar ===
NH – normal hill / LH – large hill
#	Date	Place	Hill	Size	Winner	Second	Third	Yellow bib	R.
	30 July 2022	(Estonia) Otepää	Tehvandi HS97	NH	Cancelled due to organizational problems				
	31 July 2022	(Estonia) Otepää	Tehvandi HS97	NH	Cancelled due to organizational problems				
1	12 August 2022	(Czech Republic) Frenštát pod Radhoštěm	Areal Horečky HS106	NH	(Germany) Eric Fuchs	(Austria) Janni Reisenauer	(Slovenia) Jernej Presečnik	(Germany) Eric Fuchs	
2	13 August 2022	(Czech Republic) Frenštát pod Radhoštěm	Areal Horečky HS106	NH	(Austria) Janni Reisenauer	(Austria) Mika Schwann	(Germany) Eric Fuchs	(Austria) Janni Reisenauer	
3	20 August 2022	(Poland) Szczyrk	Skalite HS104	NH	(Austria) Niklas Bachlinger	(Austria) Janni Reisenauer	(Slovenia) Rok Oblak	(Austria) Janni Reisenauer	
4	21 August 2022	(Poland) Szczyrk	Skalite HS104	NH	(Austria) Maximilian Lienher	(Italy) Giovanni Bresadola	(Austria) Niklas Bachlinger	(Austria) Janni Reisenauer	
5	27 August 2022	(Switzerland) Einsiedeln	Andreas Küttel Schanze HS117	LH	(Austria) Marco Wörgötter	(Slovenia) Maksim Bartolj	(Germany) Eric Fuchs	(Austria) Janni Reisenauer	
6	28 August 2022	(Switzerland) Einsiedeln	Andreas Küttel Schanze HS117	LH	(Austria) Jonas Schuster	(Slovenia) Maksim Bartolj	(Austria) Maximilian Lienher	(Austria) Janni Reisenauer	
7	2 September 2022	(Slovenia) Kranj	Bauhenk HS109	NH	(Slovenia) Anže Lanišek	(Slovenia) Lovro Kos	(Slovenia) Rok Oblak	(Austria) Janni Reisenauer	
8	3 September 2022	(Slovenia) Kranj	Bauhenk HS109	NH	(Austria) Janni Reisenauer	(Slovenia) Jernej Presečnik	(Slovenia) Rok Oblak	(Austria) Janni Reisenauer	
9	10 September 2022	(Austria) Villach	Villacher Alpenarena HS98	NH	(Poland) Tomasz Pilch	(Italy) Francesco Cecon	(Austria) Clemens Leitner	(Austria) Janni Reisenauer	
10	11 September 2022	(Austria) Villach	Villacher Alpenarena HS98	NH	(Italy) Francesco Cecon	(Austria) Clemens Leitner	(Austria) Markus Rupitsch	(Austria) Janni Reisenauer	
	3 December 2022	(Sweden) Falun	Lugnet HS100	NH	Cancelled due to organizational problems				
	4 December 2022	(Sweden) Falun	Lugnet HS100	NH	Cancelled due to organizational problems				
11	16 December 2022	(Norway) Notodden	Tveitanbakken HS100	NH	(Germany) Martin Hamann	(Austria) Maximilian Steiner	(Austria) Francisco Mörth	(Austria) Janni Reisenauer	
12	17 December 2022	(Norway) Notodden	Tveitanbakken HS100	NH	(Germany) Martin Hamann	(Austria) Maximilian Steiner	(Austria) Francisco Mörth	(Austria) Janni Reisenauer	
	7 January 2023	(Poland) Zakopane	Średnia Krokiew HS105	NH	Cancelled due to organizational problems				
	8 January 2023	(Poland) Zakopane	Średnia Krokiew HS105	NH	Cancelled due to organizational problems				
13	11 February 2023	(Poland) Szczyrk	Skalite HS104	NH	(Germany) Martin Hamann	(Poland) Kacper Juroszek	(Austria) Hannes Landerer	(Austria) Janni Reisenauer	
14	12 February 2023	(Poland) Szczyrk	Skalite HS104	NH	(Germany) Felix Hoffmann	(Germany) Martin Hamann	(Poland) Kacper Juroszek	(Austria) Maximilian Lienher	
15	18 February 2023	(Austria) Villach	Villacher Alpenarena HS98	NH	(Austria) Maximilian Ortner	(Germany) Felix Hoffmann	(Germany) Sebastian Schwarz	(Austria) Maximilian Lienher	
16	19 February 2023	(Austria) Villach	Villacher Alpenarena HS98	NH	(Germany) Felix Hoffmann	(Austria) Hannes Landerer	(Germany) Eric Fuchs	(Austria) Maximilian Lienher	
17	4 March 2023	(Germany) Oberhof	Kanzlersgrund HS100	NH	(Poland) Klemens Murańka	(Austria) Maximilian Lienher	(Austria) Jonas Schuster	(Austria) Maximilian Lienher	
18	5 March 2023	(Germany) Oberhof	Kanzlersgrund HS100	NH	(Austria) Timon-Pascal Kahofer	(Austria) Markus Rupitsch	(Austria) Julijan Smid	(Austria) Maximilian Lienher	
19	9 March 2023	(Poland) Zakopane	Wielka Krokiew HS140	LH	(Poland) Kacper Tomasiak	(Poland) Klemens Joniak	(Austria) Maximilian Lienher	(Austria) Maximilian Lienher	
20	10 March 2023	(Poland) Zakopane	Wielka Krokiew HS140	LH	(Germany) Martin Hamann	(France) Mathis Contamine	(Austria) Markus Rupitsch	(Austria) Maximilian Lienher	

=== Overall standings ===
Rank	after all 20 events	Points
1	(Austria) Maximilian Lienher	771
2	(Austria) Janni Reisenauer	692
3	(Austria) Niklas Bachlinger	593
4	(Germany) Martin Hamann	480
5	(Austria) Markus Rupitsch	466
6	(Austria) Marco Wörgötter	445
7	(Germany) Eric Fuchs	410
8	(Germany) Felix Hoffmann	394
9	(Austria) Clemens Leitner	364
10	(Slovenia) Jernej Presečnik	329

== Women ==
=== Calendar ===
NH – normal hill / LH – large hill
#	Date	Place	Hill	Size	Winner	Second	Third	Yellow bib	R.
1	20 August 2022	(Poland) Szczyrk	Skalite HS104	NH	(Austria) Hannah Wiegele	(Canada) Abigail Strate	(Poland) Nicole Konderla	(Austria) Hannah Wiegele	
2	21 August 2022	(Poland) Szczyrk	Skalite HS104	NH	(Slovenia) Ajda Kosnjek	(Canada) Abigail Strate	(Poland) Nicole Konderla	(Canada) Abigail Strate	
3	27 August 2022	(Switzerland) Einsiedeln	Andreas Küttel Schanze HS117	LH	(Poland) Nicole Konderla	(Germany) Juliane Seyfarth	(Japan) Yuzuki Sato	(Poland) Nicole Konderla	
4	27 August 2022	(Switzerland) Einsiedeln	Andreas Küttel Schanze HS117	LH	(Poland) Nicole Konderla	(Japan) Riko Sakurai	(Switzerland) Emely Torazza	(Poland) Nicole Konderla	
5	2 September 2022	(Slovenia) Kranj	Bauhenk HS109	NH	(Slovenia) Nika Križnar	(Slovenia) Nika Prevc	(Czech Republic) Karolína Indráčková	(Poland) Nicole Konderla	
6	3 September 2022	(Slovenia) Kranj	Bauhenk HS109	NH	(Slovenia) Nika Prevc	(Czech Republic) Klára Ulrichová	(Slovenia) Taja Bodlaj	(Poland) Nicole Konderla	
7	10 September 2022	(Austria) Villach	Villacher Alpenarena HS98	NH	(Slovenia) Nika Prevc	(Slovenia) Maja Vtič	(Japan) Nagomi Nakayama	(Slovenia) Nika Prevc	
8	11 September 2022	(Austria) Villach	Villacher Alpenarena HS98	NH	(Austria) Hannah Wiegele	(Slovenia) Taja Bodlaj	(Slovenia) Ajda Kosnjek	(Slovenia) Nika Prevc	
	3 December 2022	(Sweden) Falun	Lugnet HS100	NH	Cancelled due to organizational problems				
	4 December 2022	(Sweden) Falun	Lugnet HS100	NH	Cancelled due to organizational problems				
9	11 February 2023	(Poland) Szczyrk	Skalite HS104	NH	(Germany) Juliane Seyfarth	(Poland) Nicole Konderla	(Germany) Maike Tyralla	(Poland) Nicole Konderla	
10	12 February 2023	(Poland) Szczyrk	Skalite HS104	NH	(Germany) Juliane Seyfarth	(Poland) Nicole Konderla	(Poland) Kinga Rajda	(Poland) Nicole Konderla	
11	18 February 2023	(Austria) Villach	Villacher Alpenarena HS98	NH	(Slovenia) Nejka Repinc Zupančič	(China) Zhou Shiyu	(France) Lilou Zepchi	(Poland) Nicole Konderla	
12	19 February 2023	(Austria) Villach	Villacher Alpenarena HS98	NH	(Slovenia) Nejka Repinc Zupančič	(Slovenia) Taja Bodlaj	(France) Lilou Zepchi	(Poland) Nicole Konderla	
13	4 March 2023	(Germany) Oberhof	Kanzlersgrund HS100	NH	(Germany) Juliane Seyfarth	(Slovenia) Katarina Pirnovar	(Slovenia) Taja Bodlaj	(Poland) Nicole Konderla	
14	5 March 2023	(Germany) Oberhof	Kanzlersgrund HS100	NH	(Germany) Michelle Göbel	(Germany) Juliane Seyfarth	(Czech Republic) Anežka Indráčková (Slovenia) Katarina Pirnovar	(Germany) Juliane Seyfarth	

=== Overall standings ===
Rank	after all 14 events	Points
1	(Germany) Juliane Seyfarth	552
2	(Slovenia) Taja Bodlaj	494
3	(Poland) Nicole Konderla	480
4	(Germany) Michelle Göbel (Slovenia) Nejka Repinc Zupančič	401
6	(Slovenia) Nika Prevc	380
7	(Slovenia) Katarina Pirnovar	314
8	(Slovenia) Ajda Kosnjek	251
9	(Japan) Riko Sakurai	248
10	(Germany) Pia Lilian Kübler	247

== Podium table by nation ==
Table showing the FIS Cup podium places (gold–1st place, silver–2nd place, bronze–3rd place) by the countries represented by the athletes.

Rank	Nation	Gold	Silver	Bronze	Total
1	Germany	11	4	5	20
2	Austria	10	9	11	30
3	Slovenia	7	9	8	24
4	Poland	5	4	4	13
5	Italy	1	2	0	3
6	Canada	0	2	0	2
7	Czech Republic	0	1	2	3
7	France	0	1	2	3
7	Japan	0	1	2	3
10	China	0	1	0	1
11	Switzerland	0	0	1	1
Totals (11 entries)		34	34	35	103
