= 2022–23 FIS Ski Jumping Continental Cup =

Ski-jumping competition series

Discipline	Men	Women
Summer	(Austria) Michael Hayböck	(Canada) Abigail Strate
Winter	(Norway) Benjamin Østvold	(Germany) Michelle Göbel

Competition
Edition	21st (summer), 30th (winter)	14th (summer), 19th (winter)
Locations	4 (summer), 11 (winter)	2 (summer), 5 (winter)
Individual	9 (summer), 25 (winter)	5 (summer), 8 (winter)

The 2022/23 FIS Ski Jumping Continental Cup was the 32nd (29th official) (Note: Last two seasons of Europa Cup in 1991/92 and 1992/93 are recognized as first two Continental Cup seasons by International Ski Federation, although Continental Cup under this name officially started first season in 1993/94 season.) Continental Cup winter season in ski jumping for men and the 19th for women. This is also the 21st summer continental cup season for men and 14th for women.

Other competitive circuits this season include the World Cup, Grand Prix, FIS Cup, Alpen Cup and New Star Trophy.

This season was the last time the Continental Cup competition for women was held. From the 2023–24 season, it was merged with the FIS Cup and transformed into the Women's Intercontinental Cup.

== Map of Continental Cup hosts ==
All 16 locations hosting Continental Cup events for men (4 summer / 11 winter), for women (2 summer / 5 winter) and shared (6) in this season.

Europe	Asia 2022–23 FIS Ski Jumping Continental Cup (Asia) North America 2022–23 FIS Ski Jumping Continental Cup (North America)

Men Women Shared

== Men's Individual ==
Individual men's events in the Continental Cup history

Total	F	L	N	Winners	Competition
236	—	132	104		Summer
1003	4	591	408		Winter

after large hill event in Lahti (19 March 2023)

=== Summer ===
N – normal hill / L – large hill
All	No.	Date	Place (Hill)	Size	Winner	Second	Third	Overall leader	R.
228	1	3 September 2022	(Norway) Lillehammer (Lysgårdsbakken HS140)	L _{125}	(Norway) Sondre Ringen	(Japan) Ren Nikaido	(Norway) K. Eriksen Sundal	(Norway) Sondre Ringen	
229	2	4 September 2022	(Norway) Lillehammer (Lysgårdsbakken HS140)	L _{126}	(Norway) Sondre Ringen	(Japan) Ren Nikaido	(Norway) K. Eriksen Sundal	(Norway) Sondre Ringen	
230	3	17 September 2022	(Austria) Stams (Brunnentalschanze HS115)	L _{127}	(Austria) Michael Hayböck	(Austria) Philipp Aschenwald	(Germany) Philipp Raimund	(Norway) Sondre Ringen	
231	4	17 September 2022	(Austria) Stams (Brunnentalschanze HS115)	L _{128}	(Poland) A. Zniszczoł	(Austria) Michael Hayböck	(Norway) Anders Fannemel	(Norway) Sondre Ringen	
232	5	24 September 2022	(Germany) Klingenthal (Vogtland Arena HS140)	L _{129}	(Norway) Sondre Ringen	(Austria) Michael Hayböck	(Norway) K. Eriksen Sundal	(Norway) Sondre Ringen	
233	6	25 September 2022	(Germany) Klingenthal (Vogtland Arena HS140)	L _{130}	(Austria) Michael Hayböck	(Norway) Sondre Ringen	(Norway) Anders Fannemel	(Norway) Sondre Ringen	
234	7	7 October 2022	(United States) Lake Placid (MacKenzie Inter. HS100 / 128)	N _{104}	(Austria) Michael Hayböck	(Poland) Tomasz Pilch	(Poland) A. Zniszczoł	(Austria) Michael Hayböck	
235	8	8 October 2022	(United States) Lake Placid (MacKenzie Inter. HS100 / 128)	L _{131}	(Austria) Michael Hayböck	(Poland) Aleksander Zniszczoł	(Norway) K. Eriksen Sundal	(Austria) Michael Hayböck	
236	9	9 October 2022	(United States) Lake Placid (MacKenzie Inter. HS100 / 128)	L _{132}	(Austria) Michael Hayböck	(Poland) A. Zniszczoł	(Poland) Tomasz Pilch	(Austria) Michael Hayböck	

=== Winter ===
L – large hill
All	No.	Date	Place (Hill)	Size	Winner	Second	Third	Overall leader	R.
979	1	10 December 2022	(Norway) Vikersund (Storbakke HS117)	L _{569}	(Norway) Sondre Ringen	(Germany) Philipp Raimund	(Austria) Clemens Leitner	(Norway) Sondre Ringen	
980	2	11 December 2022	(Norway) Vikersund (Storbakke HS117)	L _{570}	(Germany) Philipp Raimund	(Norway) Sondre Ringen	(Norway) Benjamin Østvold	(Germany) Philipp Raimund (Norway) Sondre Ringen	
981	3	17 December 2022	(Finland) Ruka (Rukatunturi HS142)	L _{571}	(Norway) Anders Fannemel	(Norway) J. Ødegård Bjøreng	(Finland) Eetu Nousiainen	(Germany) Philipp Raimund (Norway) Sondre Ringen	
982	4	18 December 2022	(Finland) Ruka (Rukatunturi HS142)	L _{572}	(Germany) Philipp Raimund	(Norway) J. Ødegård Bjøreng	(Norway) Anders Fannemel	(Germany) Philipp Raimund	
983	5	27 December 2022	(Switzerland) Engelberg (Gross-Titlis-Schanze HS140)	L _{573}	(Norway) Benjamin Østvold	(Austria) Clemens Aigner	(Norway) Fredrik Villumstad	(Germany) Philipp Raimund	
984	6	28 December 2022	(Switzerland) Engelberg (Gross-Titlis-Schanze HS140)	L _{574}	(Norway) Benjamin Østvold	(Norway) Sondre Ringen	(Austria) Clemens Aigner	(Norway) Benjamin Østvold	
985	7	7 January 2023	(Slovenia) Planica (Bloudkova velikanka HS138)	L _{575}	(Slovenia) Žak Mogel	(Norway) Benjamin Østvold	(Slovenia) Rok Masle	(Norway) Benjamin Østvold	
986	8	8 January 2023	(Slovenia) Planica (Bloudkova velikanka HS138)	L _{576}	(Norway) Fredrik Villumstad	(Norway) J. Ødegård Bjøreng	(Norway) Benjamin Østvold	(Norway) Benjamin Østvold	
987	9	14 January 2023	(Japan) Sapporo (Ōkurayama HS137)	L _{577}	(Norway) Sondre Ringen	(Austria) Philipp Aschenwald	(Slovenia) Matija Vidic	(Norway) Sondre Ringen	
988	10	15 January 2023	(Japan) Sapporo (Ōkurayama HS137)	L _{578}	(Norway) J. Ødegård Bjøreng	(Poland) Tomasz Pilch	(Slovenia) Žak Mogel	(Norway) J. Ødegård Bjøreng	
989	11	15 January 2023	(Japan) Sapporo (Ōkurayama HS137)	L _{579}	(Austria) Philipp Aschenwald	(Norway) J. Ødegård Bjøreng	(Norway) Fredrik Villumstad	(Norway) J. Ødegård Bjøreng	
990	12	21 January 2023	(Austria) Eisenerz (Erzbergschanzen HS109)	N _{407}	(Austria) Maximilian Steiner	(Slovenia) Matija Vidic	(Austria) Ulrich Wohlgenannt	(Norway) J. Ødegård Bjøreng	
991	13	22 January 2023	(Austria) Eisenerz (Erzbergschanzen HS109)	N _{408}	(Austria) Ulrich Wohlgenannt	(Austria) Maximilian Steiner	(Poland) Tomasz Pilch	(Norway) J. Ødegård Bjøreng	
992	14	11 February 2023	(Germany) Klingenthal (Vogtland Arena HS140)	L _{580}	(Norway) Sondre Ringen	(Norway) Benjamin Østvold	(Germany) Justin Lisso	(Norway) J. Ødegård Bjøreng	
993	15	12 February 2023	(Germany) Klingenthal (Vogtland Arena HS140)	L _{581}	(Ukraine) Yevhen Marusiak	(Switzerland) Remo Imhof	(Norway) Benjamin Østvold	(Norway) J. Ødegård Bjøreng	
994	16	18 February 2023	(Norway) Rena (Renabakkene HS139)	L _{582}	(Norway) Benjamin Østvold	(Germany) Luca Roth (Norway) Fredrik Villumstad		(Norway) Benjamin Østvold	
995	17	19 February 2023	(Norway) Rena (Renabakkene HS139)	L _{583}	(Norway) Benjamin Østvold	(Germany) Martin Hamann	(Norway) Sondre Ringen	(Norway) Benjamin Østvold	
		25 February 2023	(Germany) Brotterode (Inselbergschanze HS117)	L _{cnx}	cancelled due to organizational problems and weather conditions			—	
		26 February 2023	(Germany) Brotterode (Inselbergschanze HS117)	L _{cnx}	cancelled due to organizational problems and weather conditions			—	
996	18	3 March 2023	(United States) Iron Mountain (Pine Mountain HS133)	L _{584}	(Germany) Felix Hoffmann	(Germany) Martin Hamann	(Norway) Fredrik Villumstad	(Norway) Benjamin Østvold	
997	19	4 March 2023	(United States) Iron Mountain (Pine Mountain HS133)	L _{585}	(Germany) Felix Hoffmann	(Germany) Martin Hamann	(Norway) Sondre Ringen	(Norway) Sondre Ringen	
998	20	4 March 2023	(United States) Iron Mountain (Pine Mountain HS133)	L _{586}	(Norway) Benjamin Østvold	(Germany) Felix Hoffmann	(Germany) Martin Hamann	(Norway) Benjamin Østvold	
999	21	5 March 2023	(United States) Iron Mountain (Pine Mountain HS133)	L _{587}	(Norway) Benjamin Østvold	(Germany) Luca Roth	(Slovenia) Rok Masle	(Norway) Benjamin Østvold	
1000	22	12 March 2023	(Poland) Zakopane (Wielka Krokiew HS140)	L _{588}	(Austria) Clemens Leitner	(Germany) Felix Hoffmann	(Norway) Benjamin Østvold	(Norway) Benjamin Østvold	
1001	23	12 March 2023	(Poland) Zakopane (Wielka Krokiew HS140)	L _{589}	(Austria) Philipp Aschenwald	(Germany) Felix Hoffmann	(Austria) Markus Müller	(Norway) Benjamin Østvold	
1002	24	18 March 2023	(Finland) Lahti (Salpausselkä HS130)	L _{590}	(Austria) Clemens Leitner	(Slovenia) Matija Vidic	(Germany) Martin Hamann	(Norway) Benjamin Østvold	
1003	25	19 March 2023	(Finland) Lahti (Salpausselkä HS130)	L _{591}	(Austria) Clemens Leitner	(Germany) Martin Hamann	(Austria) Markus Müller	(Norway) Benjamin Østvold	

=== Standings ===
==== Summer ====
Rank	after all 9 events	Points
1	(Austria) Michael Hayböck	660
2	(Poland) Aleksander Zniszczoł	436
3	(Norway) Sondre Ringen (Norway) Kristoffer Eriksen Sundal	414
5	(Norway) Anders Fannemel	362
6	(Norway) Anders Håre	217
7	(Norway) Benjamin Østvold	215
8	(Austria) Francisco Mörth	201
9	(Slovenia) Žak Mogel	198
10	(Slovenia) Lovro Kos	190

==== Winter ====
Rank	after all 25 events	Points
1	(Norway) Benjamin Østvold	1079
2	(Norway) Fredrik Villumstad	881
3	(Norway) Sondre Ringen	873
4	(Austria) Clemens Leitner	743
5	(Germany) Martin Hamann	726
6	(Norway) Joacim Ødegård Bjøreng	652
7	(Germany) Felix Hoffmann	629
8	(Austria) Markus Müller	625
9	(Slovenia) Žak Mogel	592
10	(Germany) Luca Roth	583

== Women's Individual ==
Individual women's events in the Continental Cup history

Total	L	N	M	Winners	Competition
73	2	60	11		Summer
192	29	148	15		Winter

after large hill event in Lahti (17 March 2023)

=== Summer ===
N – normal hill / L – large hill
All	No.	Date	Place (Hill)	Size	Winner	Second	Third	Overall leader	R.
69	1	3 September 2022	(Norway) Lillehammer (Lysgårdsbakken HS98)	N _{056}	(Canada) Abigail Strate	(Norway) Silje Opseth	(Sweden) Frida Westman	(Canada) Abigail Strate	
70	2	4 September 2022	(Norway) Lillehammer (Lysgårdsbakken HS98)	N _{057}	(Canada) Abigail Strate	(Sweden) Frida Westman	(Germany) Katharina Althaus	(Canada) Abigail Strate	
71	3	7 October 2022	(United States) Lake Placid (MacKenzie Intervale HS100)	N _{058}	(Canada) Abigail Strate	(Canada) Natalie Eilers	(Norway) Nora Midtsundstad	(Canada) Abigail Strate	
72	4	7 October 2022	(United States) Lake Placid (MacKenzie Intervale HS100)	N _{059}	(Canada) Abigail Strate	(Canada) Natalie Eilers	(Norway) Nora Midtsundstad	(Canada) Abigail Strate	
73	5	8 October 2022	(United States) Lake Placid (MacKenzie Intervale HS100)	N _{060}	(Canada) Abigail Strate	(Canada) Natalie Eilers	(Norway) Nora Midtsundstad	(Canada) Abigail Strate	

=== Winter ===
N – normal hill / L – large hill
All	No.	Date	Place (Hill)	Size	Winner	Second	Third	Overall leader	R.
185	1	9 December 2022	(Norway) Vikersund (Storbakke HS117)	L _{026}	(Norway) Nora Midtsundstad	(Switzerland) Sina Arnet	(Germany) Michelle Göbel	(Norway) Nora Midtsundstad	
186	2	10 December 2022	(Norway) Vikersund (Storbakke HS117)	L _{027}	(Norway) Nora Midtsundstad	(Switzerland) Sina Arnet	(Germany) Michelle Göbel	(Norway) Nora Midtsundstad	
187	3	16 December 2022	(Norway) Notodden (Tveitanbakken HS100)	N _{145}	(Germany) Juliane Seyfarth	(United States) Annika Belshaw	(Germany) Michelle Göbel	(Norway) Nora Midtsundstad	
188	4	17 December 2022	(Norway) Notodden (Tveitanbakken HS100)	N _{146}	(Norway) Nora Midtsundstad	(United States) Annika Belshaw	(Germany) Juliane Seyfarth	(Norway) Nora Midtsundstad	
189	5	21 January 2023	(Austria) Eisenerz (Erzbergschanzen HS109)	N _{147}	(Germany) Juliane Seyfarth	(Germany) Michelle Göbel	(Czech Republic) Karolína Indráčková	(Norway) Nora Midtsundstad	
190	6	22 January 2023	(Austria) Eisenerz (Erzbergschanzen HS109)	N _{148}	(Germany) Juliane Seyfarth	(Czech Republic) Karolína Indráčková	(Germany) Michelle Göbel	(Germany) Michelle Göbel (Germany) Juliane Seyfarth	
		25 February 2023	(Germany) Brotterode (Inselbergschanze HS117)	L _{cnx}	cancelled due to organizational problems and weather conditions			—	
		26 February 2023	(Germany) Brotterode (Inselbergschanze HS117)	L _{cnx}	cancelled due to organizational problems and weather conditions			—	
191	7	17 March 2023	(Finland) Lahti (Salpausselkä HS130)	L _{028}	(Japan) Ringo Miyajima	(Slovenia) Katarina Pirnovar	(Norway) Kjersti Græsli	(Germany) Michelle Göbel	
192	8	17 March 2023	(Finland) Lahti (Salpausselkä HS130)	L _{029}	(Japan) Ringo Miyajima	(Germany) Michelle Göbel	(Norway) Kjersti Græsli	(Germany) Michelle Göbel	

=== Standings ===
==== Summer ====
Rank	after all 5 events	Points
1	(Canada) Abigail Strate	500
2	(Canada) Natalie Eilers	240
3	(Norway) Nora Midtsundstad	224
4	(United States) Annika Belshaw	188
5	(Slovenia) Taja Bodlaj	145
6	(United States) Samantha Macuga	144
7	(Sweden) Frida Westman	140
8	(Norway) Silje Opseth	130
9	(United States) Josie Johnson	123
10	(Germany) Katharina Althaus	110

==== Winter ====
Rank	after all 8 events	Points
1	(Germany) Michelle Göbel	490
2	(Norway) Nora Midtsundstad	385
3	(Germany) Juliane Seyfarth	360
4	(Norway) Ingvild Synnøve Midtskogen	232
5	(Austria) Katharina Ellmauer	223
6	(Czech Republic) Karolína Indráčková	209
7	(Japan) Ringo Miyajima	200
8	(Germany) Pia Lilian Kübler	178
9	(Norway) Kjersti Græsli	176
10	(Slovenia) Nejka Repinc Zupančič	167

== Podium table by nation ==
Table showing the World Cup podium places (gold–1st place, silver–2nd place, bronze–3rd place) by the countries represented by the athletes.

Rank	Nation	Gold	Silver	Bronze	Total
1	Norway	18	11	21	50
2	Austria	12	6	5	23
3	Germany	7	12	10	29
4	Canada	5	3	0	8
5	Japan	2	2	0	4
6	Poland	1	4	3	8
7	Slovenia	1	3	4	8
8	Ukraine	1	0	0	1
9	Switzerland	0	3	0	3
10	United States	0	2	0	2
11	Czech Republic	0	1	1	2
11	Sweden	0	1	1	2
13	Finland	0	0	1	1
Totals (13 entries)		47	48	46	141
