= 2021–22 FIS Ski Jumping Continental Cup =

Ski-jumping competition series

Discipline	Men	Women
Summer	(Austria) Manuel Fettner	(Austria) Julia Mühlbacher (Austria) Hannah Wiegele
Winter	(Austria) Thomas Lackner	(Germany) Luisa Görlich

Competition
Edition	20th (summer), 29th (winter)	13th (summer), 18th (winter)
Locations	6 (summer), 12 (winter)	3 (summer), 8 (winter)
Individual	12 (summer), 26 (winter)	6 (summer), 16 (winter)
Cancelled	6	–
Rescheduled	5	–

The 2021/22 FIS Ski Jumping Continental Cup was the 31st in a row (29th official) (Note: Last two seasons of Europa Cup in 1991/92 and 1992/93 are recognized as first two Continental Cup seasons by International Ski Federation, although Continental Cup under this name officially started first season in 1993/94 season.) Continental Cup winter season in ski jumping for men and the 18th for women. This was also the 20th summer continental cup season for men and 13th for women.

Other competitive circuits this season include the World Cup, Grand Prix, FIS Cup, FIS Race and Alpen Cup.

On 1 March 2022, following the 2022 Russian invasion of Ukraine, FIS decided to exclude athletes from Russia and Belarus from FIS competitions, with an immediate effect.

== Map of Continental Cup hosts ==
All 24 locations hosting Continental Cup events for men (6 summer / 14 winter), for women (3 summer / 8 winter) and shared (7) in this season.

2021–22 FIS Ski Jumping Continental Cup (Europe)	2021–22 FIS Ski Jumping Continental Cup (Asia) 2021–22 FIS Ski Jumping Continental Cup (North America)

Men Women Shared

== Men's Individual ==
Individual men's events in the Continental Cup history

Total	F	L	N	Winners	Competition
227	—	124	103		Summer
978	4	568	406		Winter

after large hill event in Zakopane (13 March 2022)

=== Summer ===
NH – normal hill / LH – large hill
Num	#	Date	Place	Hill	Event	Winner	Second	Third	Yellow bib	Ref.
216	1	17 July 2021 (Note: Competition from July 18 was rescheduled to July 17.)	(Finland) Kuopio (Note: The competition organized by Chinese Ski Association at the Finnish hill.)	Puijo HS127	L _{119}	(Germany) David Siegel	(Finland) Eetu Nousiainen	(Germany) Moritz Baer	(Germany) David Siegel	
217	2	17 July 2021	(Finland) Kuopio	Puijo HS127	L	(Finland) Eetu Nousiainen	(Germany) Moritz Baer	(Germany) Philipp Raimund	(Finland) Eetu Nousiainen	
218	3	13 August 2021	(Czech Republic) Frenštát pod Radhoštěm	Areal Horečky HS106	N _{098}	(Czech Republic) Viktor Polášek	(Austria) Mika Schwann	(Germany) Philipp Raimund	(Finland) Eetu Nousiainen	
219	4	14 August 2021	(Czech Republic) Frenštát pod Radhoštěm	Areal Horečky HS106	N	(Austria) Mika Schwann	(Czech Republic) Čestmír Kožíšek	(Poland) Maciej Kot	(Finland) Eetu Nousiainen	
220	5	21 August 2021	(Romania) Râșnov	Trambulina Valea Cărbunării HS97	N	(Austria) Manuel Fettner	(Austria) Ulrich Wohlgenannt	(Austria) Mika Schwann	(Austria) Mika Schwann	
221	6	22 August 2021	(Romania) Râșnov	Trambulina Valea Cărbunării HS97	N	(Austria) Mika Schwann	(Austria) Manuel Fettner	(United States) Andrew Urlaub	(Austria) Mika Schwann	
222	7	11 September 2021	(Austria) Bischofshofen	Paul-Ausserleitner-Schanze HS142	L	(Austria) Manuel Fettner	(Norway) Fredrik Villumstad	(Austria) Daniel Tschofenig	(Austria) Mika Schwann	
223	8	12 September 2021	(Austria) Bischofshofen	Paul-Ausserleitner-Schanze HS142	L	(Austria) Daniel Tschofenig	(Slovenia) Anže Lanišek	(Estonia) Artti Aigro	(Austria) Mika Schwann	
224	9	18 September 2021	(Norway) Oslo	Midtstubakken HS106	N	(Norway) Andreas Granerud Buskum	(Austria) Manuel Fettner	(Austria) Timon-Pascal Kahofer	(Austria) Mika Schwann	
225	10	19 September 2021	(Norway) Oslo	Midtstubakken HS106	N _{103}	(Norway) Fredrik Villumstad	(Austria) Manuel Fettner	(Poland) Jakub Wolny	(Austria) Mika Schwann	
226	11	25 September 2021	(Germany) Klingenthal	Vogtland Arena HS140	L	(Austria) Timon-Pascal Kahofer	(Slovenia) Lovro Kos	(Austria) Manuel Fettner	(Austria) Manuel Fettner	
227	12	26 September 2021	(Germany) Klingenthal	Vogtland Arena HS140	L _{124}	(Austria) Manuel Fettner	(Poland) Jakub Wolny	(Slovenia) Lovro Kos	(Austria) Manuel Fettner	

=== Winter ===
Num	#	Date	Place	Hill	Event	Winner	Second	Third	Yellow bib	Ref.
953	1	4 December 2021	(China) Zhangjiakou	Snow Ruyi HS140	L _{543}	(Germany) David Siegel	(Austria) Ulrich Wohlgenannt	(Austria) Stefan Rainer	(Germany) David Siegel	
954	2	5 December 2021	(China) Zhangjiakou	Snow Ruyi HS140	L	(Austria) Ulrich Wohlgenannt	(Germany) David Siegel	(Germany) Philipp Raimund	(Germany) David Siegel (Austria) Ulrich Wohlgenannt	
955	3	10 December 2021	(Norway) Vikersund	Storbakke HS117	L	(Austria) Ulrich Wohlgenannt	(Norway) Joacim Ødegård Bjøreng	(Germany) Severin Freund	(Austria) Ulrich Wohlgenannt	
956	4	11 December 2021	(Norway) Vikersund	Storbakke HS117	L	(Germany) Severin Freund	(Austria) Ulrich Wohlgenannt	(Czech Republic) Roman Koudelka	(Austria) Ulrich Wohlgenannt	
957	5	18 December 2021	(Finland) Ruka	Rukatunturi HS142	L	(Norway) Robin Pedersen	(Norway) Joacim Ødegård Bjøreng	(Norway) Sondre Ringen	(Austria) Ulrich Wohlgenannt	
958	6	19 December 2021	(Finland) Ruka	Rukatunturi HS142	L	(Norway) Robin Pedersen	(Austria) Elias Medwed	(Austria) Stefan Rainer	(Austria) Ulrich Wohlgenannt	
959	7	27 December 2021	(Switzerland) Engelberg	Gross-Titlis-Schanze HS140	L	(Norway) Benjamin Østvold	(Norway) Anders Håre	(Austria) Stefan Rainer	(Austria) Ulrich Wohlgenannt	
960	8	28 December 2021	(Switzerland) Engelberg	Gross-Titlis-Schanze HS140	L	(Norway) Sondre Ringen	(Austria) Clemens Aigner	(Austria) Michael Hayböck	(Austria) Ulrich Wohlgenannt	
		7 January 2022	(Germany) Titisee-Neustadt	Hochfirstschanze HS142	L	Cancelled due to weather conditions, moved to Oberstdorf				
		8 January 2022	(Germany) Titisee-Neustadt	Hochfirstschanze HS142	L	Cancelled due to weather conditions, moved to Oberstdorf				
		15 January 2022	(Japan) Sapporo	Okurayama HS137	L	Cancelled due to organizational problems				
		16 January 2022	(Japan) Sapporo	Okurayama HS137	L	Cancelled due to organizational problems				
961	9	15 January 2022	(Germany) Oberstdorf (Note: Cancelled competitions in Titisee Neustadt on January 7 and 8, 2022 were moved to Oberstdorf on January 15 and 16, 2022)	Schattenbergschanze HS137	L	(Austria) Ulrich Wohlgenannt	(Norway) Joacim Ødegård Bjøreng	(Norway) Benjamin Østvold	(Austria) Ulrich Wohlgenannt	
962	10	16 January 2022	(Germany) Oberstdorf	Schattenbergschanze HS137	L	(Austria) Ulrich Wohlgenannt	(Norway) Anders Håre	(Germany) Justin Lisso	(Austria) Ulrich Wohlgenannt	
963	11	(Note: One round only due to bad weather.)22 January 2022	(Austria) Innsbruck	Bergiselschanze HS128	L	(Slovenia) Anže Semenič	(Austria) Thomas Lackner	(Slovenia) Jan Bombek	(Austria) Ulrich Wohlgenannt	
964	12	23 January 2022	(Austria) Innsbruck	Bergiselschanze HS128	L	(Slovenia) Anže Semenič	(Austria) Ulrich Wohlgenannt	(Austria) Thomas Lackner	(Austria) Ulrich Wohlgenannt	
965	13	5 February 2022	(United States) Iron Mountain	Pine Mountain Ski Jump HS133	L	(Slovenia) Žiga Jelar	(Norway) Anders Håre	(Norway) Joacim Ødegård Bjøreng	(Austria) Ulrich Wohlgenannt	
966	14	5 February 2022	(United States) Iron Mountain	Pine Mountain Ski Jump HS133	L	(Slovenia) Domen Prevc	(Germany) Philipp Raimund	(Slovenia) Žiga Jelar	(Austria) Ulrich Wohlgenannt	
967	15	6 February 2022	(United States) Iron Mountain	Pine Mountain Ski Jump HS133	L	(Slovenia) Domen Prevc	(Slovenia) Žiga Jelar	(Austria) Michael Hayböck	(Austria) Ulrich Wohlgenannt	
968	16	12 February 2022	(Germany) Brotterode	Inselbergschanze HS117	L	(Norway) Joacim Ø. Bjøreng	(Poland) Kacper Juroszek	(Norway) Sondre Ringen	(Austria) Ulrich Wohlgenannt	
969	17	13 February 2022	(Germany) Brotterode	Inselbergschanze HS117	L	(Poland) Kacper Juroszek	(Poland) Jakub Wolny	(Austria) Clemens Aigner	(Austria) Ulrich Wohlgenannt	
970	18	19 February 2022	(Norway) Rena	Renabakkene HS139	L	(Norway) Fredrik Villumstad	(Slovenia) Žiga Jelar	(Austria) Michael Hayböck	(Austria) Ulrich Wohlgenannt	
971	19	20 February 2022	(Norway) Rena	Renabakkene HS139	L	(Slovenia) Žiga Jelar	(Norway) Fredrik Villumstad	(Austria) Michael Hayböck	(Austria) Ulrich Wohlgenannt	
972	20	(Note: Rescheduled due to the pandemic situation in Slovenia. Originally scheduled on 29 January 2022.)26 February 2022	(Slovenia) Planica	Bloudkova velikanka HS138	L	(Austria) Michael Hayböck	(Slovenia) Domen Prevc (Poland) Jakub Wolny		(Austria) Ulrich Wohlgenannt	
973	21	(Note: Rescheduled due to the pandemic situation in Slovenia. Originally scheduled on 30 January 2022.) (Note: One round only due to strong wind.)27 February 2022	(Slovenia) Planica	Bloudkova velikanka HS138	L	(Norway) Joacim Ø. Bjøreng	(Slovenia) Domen Prevc	(Norway) Benjamin Østvold	(Norway) Joacim Ø. Bjøreng	
974	22	5 March 2022	(Finland) Lahti	Salpausselkä HS130	L	(Austria) Thomas Lackner	(Poland) Aleksander Zniszczoł	(Poland) Maciej Kot	(Norway) Joacim Ø. Bjøreng	
975	23	6 March 2022	(Finland) Lahti	Salpausselkä HS130	L	(Austria) Michael Hayböck	(Poland) Andrzej Stękała	(Austria) Thomas Lackner	(Norway) Joacim Ø. Bjøreng	
976	24	12 March 2022	(Poland) Zakopane	Wielka Krokiew HS140	L	(Slovenia) Žiga Jelar	(Austria) Thomas Lackner	(Slovenia) Bor Pavlovčič	(Norway) Joacim Ø. Bjøreng	
977	25	12 March 2022	(Poland) Zakopane	Wielka Krokiew HS140	L	(Austria) Thomas Lackner	(Austria) David Haagen	(Germany) Philipp Raimund	(Austria) Thomas Lackner	
978	26	13 March 2022	(Poland) Zakopane	Wielka Krokiew HS140	L _{568}	(Poland) Andrzej Stękała	(Slovenia) Jan Bombek	(Slovenia) Žiga Jelar	(Austria) Thomas Lackner	
		26 March 2022	(Russia) Chaykovsky	Snezhinka HS140	L	cancelled due to Russian invasion of Ukraine				
		27 March 2022	(Russia) Chaykovsky	Snezhinka HS140	L	cancelled due to Russian invasion of Ukraine				

=== Standings ===
==== Summer ====
Rank	after all 12 events	Points
1	(Austria) Manuel Fettner	650
2	(Austria) Mika Schwann	517
3	(Norway) Fredrik Villumstad	399
4	(Finland) Eetu Nousiainen	311
5	(Germany) David Siegel	301
6	(Austria) Daniel Tschofenig	283
7	(Austria) Timon-Pascal Kahofer	232
8	(Austria) Ulrich Wohlgenannt	215
9	(Austria) David Haagen	207
10	(Austria) Markus Müller	192

==== Winter ====
Rank	after all 26 events	Points
1	(Austria) Thomas Lackner	1010
2	(Norway) Joacim Ødegård Bjøreng	997
3	(Austria) Ulrich Wohlgenannt	798
4	(Slovenia) Žiga Jelar	716
5	(Germany) Philipp Raimund	707
6	(Austria) Michael Hayböck	608
7	(Slovenia) Domen Prevc	588
8	(Slovenia) Anže Semenič	572
9	(Norway) Sondre Ringen	564
10	(Norway) Anders Håre	498

== Women's Individual ==
Individual women's events in the Continental Cup history

Total	L	N	M	Winners	Competition
68	2	55	11		Summer
184	25	144	15		Winter

after normal hill event in Lake Placid (26 March 2022)

=== Summer ===
NH – normal hill / LH – large hill
Num	#	Date	Place	Hill	Event	Winner	Second	Third	Yellow bib	Ref.
63	1	17 July 2021	(Finland) Kuopio	Puijo HS100	N _{050}	(China) Birun Shao	(Austria) Julia Mühlbacher	(Russia) Mariia Iakovleva	(China) Birun Shao	
64	2	17 July 2021	(Finland) Kuopio	Puijo HS100	N	(Russia) Mariia Iakovleva	(Austria) Julia Mühlbacher	(Japan) Kurumi Ichinohe	(Russia) Mariia Iakovleva (Austria) Julia Mühlbacher	
65	3	21 August 2021	(Romania) Râșnov	Trambulina Valea Cărbunării HS97	N	(Slovenia) Jerneja Brecl	(China) Liangyao Wang	(China) Bing Dong	(Austria) Julia Mühlbacher	
66	4	22 August 2021	(Romania) Râșnov	Trambulina Valea Cărbunării HS97	N	(Slovenia) Jerneja Brecl	(China) Bing Dong	(Poland) Joanna Szwab	(China) Bing Dong	
67	5	18 September 2021	(Norway) Oslo	Midtstubakken HS106	N	(Germany) Katharina Althaus	(Germany) Pauline Heßler	(Germany) Juliane Seyfarth	(Austria) Julia Mühlbacher	
68	6	19 September 2021	(Norway) Oslo	Midtstubakken HS106	N _{055}	(Germany) Katharina Althaus	(Germany) Pauline Heßler	(Austria) Hannah Wiegele	(Austria) Julia Mühlbacher (Austria) Hannah Wiegele	

=== Winter ===
Num	#	Date	Place	Hill	Event	Winner	Second	Third	Yellow bib	Ref.
169	1	4 December 2021	(China) Zhangjiakou	Snow Ruyi HS106	N _{135}	(Russia) Mariia Iakovleva	(Russia) Diana Toropchenova	(Germany) Carina Vogt	(Russia) Mariia Iakovleva	
170	2	5 December 2021	(China) Zhangjiakou	Snow Ruyi HS106	N	(Russia) Diana Toropchenova	(China) Bing Dong	(Germany) Carina Vogt	(Russia) Diana Toropchenova	
171	3	11 December 2021	(Norway) Vikersund	Storbakke HS117	L _{020}	(Slovenia) Jerneja Repinc Zupančič	(Russia) Ksenia Kablukova	(Austria) Julia Mühlbacher	(Russia) Diana Toropchenova	
172	4	12 December 2021	(Norway) Vikersund	Storbakke HS117	L	(Austria) Sophie Sorschag	(Slovenia) Jerneja Repinc Zupančič	(Slovenia) Nika Vetrih	(Slovenia) Jerneja Repinc Zupančič (Russia) Diana Toropchenova	
173	5	17 December 2021	(Norway) Notodden	Tveitanbakken HS100	N	(Austria) Sophie Sorschag	(Germany) Luisa Görlich	(Austria) Julia Mühlbacher	(Austria) Sophie Sorschag	
174	6	18 December 2021	(Norway) Notodden	Tveitanbakken HS100	N	(Austria) Sophie Sorschag	(Germany) Luisa Görlich	(Austria) Julia Mühlbacher	(Austria) Sophie Sorschag	
175	7	22 January 2022	(Austria) Innsbruck	Bergiselschanze HS128	L	(Japan) Sara Takanashi	(Russia) Aleksandra Kustova	(Japan) Yūki Itō	(Austria) Sophie Sorschag	
176	8	23 January 2022	(Austria) Innsbruck	Bergiselschanze HS128	L	(Japan) Sara Takanashi	(Russia) Aleksandra Kustova	(Austria) Sophie Sorschag	(Austria) Sophie Sorschag	
177	9	12 February 2022	(Germany) Brotterode	Inselbergschanze HS117	L	(Austria) Chiara Kreuzer	(Slovenia) Nika Prevc	(Germany) Josephin Laue	(Austria) Sophie Sorschag	
178	10	13 February 2022	(Germany) Brotterode	Inselbergschanze HS117	L _{025}	(Slovenia) Nika Prevc	(Slovenia) Jerneja Brecl	(Slovenia) Taja Bodlaj	(Austria) Sophie Sorschag	
179	11	12 March 2022	(United States) Park City	Utah Olympic Park Jump HS100	N	(United States) Logan Sankey	(United States) Nina Lussi	(United States) Paige Jones	(Austria) Sophie Sorschag	
180	12	13 March 2022	(United States) Park City	Utah Olympic Park Jump HS100	N	(Germany) Carina Vogt	(Canada) Natalie Eilers	(Germany) Josephin Laue	(Austria) Sophie Sorschag	
181	13	18 March 2022	(Canada) Whistler	Whistler Olympic Park HS104	N	(Germany) Katharina Althaus	(Germany) Luisa Görlich	(Canada) Alexandria Loutitt	(Austria) Sophie Sorschag	
182	14	19 March 2022	(Canada) Whistler	Whistler Olympic Park HS104	N	(Germany) Katharina Althaus	(Germany) Luisa Görlich	(Germany) Juliane Seyfarth	(Germany) Luisa Görlich	
183	15	25 March 2022	(United States) Lake Placid	MacKenzie Intervale Ski Jump HS100	N	(United States) Annika Belshaw (Austria) Katharina Ellmauer		(Austria) Hannah Wiegele	(Germany) Luisa Görlich	
184	16	26 March 2022	(United States) Lake Placid	MacKenzie Intervale Ski Jump HS100	N _{144}	(Austria) Hannah Wiegele	(United States) Annika Belshaw	(Austria) Katharina Ellmauer	(Germany) Luisa Görlich	

=== Standings ===
==== Summer ====
Rank	after all 6 events	Points
1	(Austria) Julia Mühlbacher (Austria) Hannah Wiegele	230
3	(China) Bing Dong	207
4	(Russia) Mariia Iakovleva	204
5	(Germany) Katharina Althaus (Slovenia) Jerneja Brecl	200
7	(Germany) Pauline Heßler (China) Liangyao Wang	160
9	(China) Birun Shao	159
10	(China) Qingyue Peng	157

==== Winter ====
Rank	after all 16 events	Points
1	(Germany) Luisa Görlich	457
2	(Austria) Hannah Wiegele	450
3	(Austria) Sophie Sorschag	441
4	(United States) Annika Belshaw	426
5	(Germany) Josephin Laue	327
6	(Austria) Katharina Ellmauer	320
7	(Slovenia) Jerneja Repinc Zupančič	296
8	(Austria) Vanessa Moharitsch	288
9	(United States) Paige Jones	285
10	(Germany) Carina Vogt	271
