= 2nd Silvester Tournament =

Women's ski jumping competition

- Venue: Villacher Alpenarena (HS98); Savina Ski Jumping Center (HS94)
- Location: Villach, Austria; Ljubno ob Savinji, Slovenia
- Dates: 27 December 2022 – 1 January 2023

Medalists
gold medal	(Austria) Eva Pinkelnig — 1030.3 points
silver medal	(Norway) Anna Odine Strøm — 1004.0 points
bronze medal	(Slovenia) Nika Križnar — 980.3 points

The 2nd Silvester Tournament was the second edition of the Silvester Tournament, a women's ski jumping competition held between 27 December 2022 and 1 January 2023.

The competition was based on a knockout system with 50 contestants divided into 25 pairs. The top 30 advanced to the final round, which consisted of 25 winners and the top 5 lucky losers.

It was part of the 2022–23 World Cup season and took place in Villach, Austria and Ljubno ob Savinji, Slovenia with a total of four events (two at each venue).

== Tournament ==
=== Map of hosts ===
(Austria) Villach	(Slovenia) Ljubno ob Savinji
Villacher Alpenarena (HS98)	Savina Ski Jumping Center (HS94)
Austria	Slovenia

=== Schedule ===
Stage	Venue	Date	Event	Winner	Start time (CET)
1	(Austria) Villach 1	27 December 2022	Qualification 1	(Austria) Eva Pinkelnig	14:15
1	(Austria) Villach 1	28 December 2022	Competition 1	(Austria) Eva Pinkelnig	14:15
2	(Austria) Villach 2	29 December 2022	Qualification 2	(Germany) Katharina Althaus	11:15
2	(Austria) Villach 2	29 December 2022	Competition 2	(Austria) Eva Pinkelnig	13:00
3	(Slovenia) Ljubno 1	30 December 2022	Qualification 3	(Canada) Alexandria Loutitt	16:30
3	(Slovenia) Ljubno 1	31 December 2022	Competition 3	(Norway) Anna Odine Strøm	16:00
4	(Slovenia) Ljubno 2	1 January 2023	Qualification 4	(Norway) Anna Odine Strøm	11:00
4	(Slovenia) Ljubno 2	1 January 2023	Competition 4	(Austria) Eva Pinkelnig	16:30

=== Prize money ===
The overall winner, Eva Pinkelnig, received €20,000 in prize money and the Golden Owl trophy.

== Results ==
=== Competition 1: Villach ===
(Austria) Villacher Alpenarena HS98
(28 December 2022)

Rank	Name	Nationality	Jump 1 (m)	Round 1 (pts)	Jump 2 (m)	Round 2 (pts)	Total Points
1	Eva Pinkelnig	Austria	91.5	127.0	95.5	130.9	257.9
2	Anna Odine Strøm	Norway	93.5	126.0	92.5	122.4	248.4
3	Nika Križnar	Slovenia	93.5	122.0	93.5	121.5	243.5
4	Alexandria Loutitt	Canada	91.5	120.7	91	122.4	243.1
5	Marita Kramer	Austria	92.5	119.3	93.5	123.6	242.9
6	Abigail Strate	Canada	91.5	121.6	93	118.8	240.4
7	Selina Freitag	Germany	91	122.7	95	117.3	240.0
8	Ema Klinec	Slovenia	95	124.9	90	114.8	239.7
9	Katharina Althaus	Germany	86.5	114.6	93	124.5	239.1
10	Urša Bogataj	Slovenia	89	118.9	93.5	119.2	238.1

=== Competition 2: Villach ===
(Austria) Villacher Alpenarena HS98
(29 December 2022)

Rank	Name	Nationality	Jump 1 (m)	Round 1 (pts)	Jump 2 (m)	Round 2 (pts)	Total Points
1	Eva Pinkelnig	Austria	94.5	130.7	94.5	129.5	260.2
2	Katharina Althaus	Germany	92	126.9	92.5	127.7	254.6
3	Nika Križnar	Slovenia	93	126.1	91	125.0	251.1
4	Selina Freitag	Germany	95	124.4	92.5	125.7	250.1
5	Anna Rupprecht	Germany	92.5	126.9	88.5	122.6	249.5
6	Anna Odine Strøm	Norway	90.5	120.0	92	125.5	245.5
7	Ema Klinec	Slovenia	92	118.9	93.5	124.7	243.6
8	Chiara Kreuzer	Austria	89	115.5	91.5	126.1	241.6
9	Alexandria Loutitt	Canada	90.5	122.2	87.5	119.2	241.4
9	Marita Kramer	Austria	89	117.8	96.5	123.6	241.4

=== Competition 3: Ljubno ===
(Slovenia) Savina Ski Jumping Center HS94
(31 December 2022)

Rank	Name	Nationality	Jump 1 (m)	Round 1 (pts)	Jump 2 (m)	Round 2 (pts)	Total Points
1	Anna Odine Strøm	Norway	91.5	125.8	90.5	133.9	259.7
2	Eva Pinkelnig	Austria	90.5	122.0	93.5	136.8	258.8
3	Katharina Althaus	Germany	90	119.7	85.5	127.3	247.0
4	Ema Klinec	Slovenia	87.5	119.9	86	126.7	246.6
5	Sara Takanashi	Japan	93.5	113.6	91	129.4	243.0
6	Nika Križnar	Slovenia	90.5	115.7	89.5	126.1	241.8
7	Chiara Kreuzer	Austria	85.5	118.1	86.5	123.5	241.6
8	Luisa Görlich	Germany	87	113.8	89	127.6	241.4
9	Urša Bogataj	Slovenia	87.5	113.7	86.5	124.1	237.8
10	Yūka Setō	Japan	90	113.7	86	123.7	237.4

=== Competition 4: Ljubno ===
(Slovenia) Savina Ski Jumping Center HS94
(1 January 2023)

Rank	Name	Nationality	Jump 1 (m)	Round 1 (pts)	Jump 2 (m)	Round 2 (pts)	Total Points
1	Eva Pinkelnig	Austria	93.5	127.9	89.5	125.5	253.4
2	Anna Odine Strøm	Norway	91.5	127.0	88	123.4	250.4
3	Selina Freitag	Germany	88.5	122.0	88.5	124.0	246.0
4	Alexandria Loutitt	Canada	89	122.8	89	122.5	245.3
5	Nika Križnar	Slovenia	92.5	121.6	87.5	122.3	243.9
6	Lara Malsiner	Italy	87	123.3	84	118.7	242.0
7	Anna Rupprecht	Germany	91.5	120.0	89	120.8	240.8
8	Abigail Strate	Canada	88	119.2	85	115.9	235.1
9	Ema Klinec	Slovenia	90.5	119.1	89	115.5	234.6
10	Sara Takanashi	Japan	92	116.3	87.5	117.2	233.5

== Overall standings ==
The final standings after all four events:

Rank	Name	Nationality	Villach 1	Villach 2	Ljubno 1	Ljubno 2	Total points
1st place, gold medalist(s)	Eva Pinkelnig	Austria	257.9	260.2	258.8	253.4	1030.3
2nd place, silver medalist(s)	Anna Odine Strøm	Norway	248.4	245.5	259.7	250.4	1004.0
3rd place, bronze medalist(s)	Nika Križnar	Slovenia	243.5	251.1	241.8	243.9	980.3
4	Selina Freitag	Germany	240.0	250.1	236.7	246.0	972.8
5	Katharina Althaus	Germany	239.1	254.6	247.0	230.2	970.9
6	Ema Klinec	Slovenia	239.7	243.6	246.6	234.6	964.5
7	Anna Rupprecht	Germany	236.6	249.5	232.3	240.8	959.2
8	Alexandria Loutitt	Canada	243.1	241.4	221.9	245.3	951.7
9	Sara Takanashi	Japan	238.0	229.3	243.0	233.5	943.8
10	Marita Kramer	Austria	242.9	241.4	229.7	226.5	940.5
