= 2022–23 FIS Ski Jumping World Cup =

Ski jumping competition

Discipline	Men	Women
Overall	(Norway) Halvor Egner Granerud	(Austria) Eva Pinkelnig
Nations Cup	Austria	Austria
Ski flying	(Austria) Stefan Kraft	—

Stage events
Raw Air	(Norway) Halvor Egner Granerud	(Slovenia) Ema Klinec
Four Hills Tournament	(Norway) Halvor Egner Granerud	—
Planica7	(Austria) Stefan Kraft	—
Silvester Tournament	—	(Austria) Eva Pinkelnig

Competition
Edition	44th	12th
Locations	19	13
Individual	33	27
Team	5	1
Mixed	1	1
Rescheduled	1	–

The 2022–23 FIS Ski Jumping World Cup was the 44th World Cup season in ski jumping for men, the 26th official World Cup season in ski flying, and the 12th World Cup season for women. The men's season was the longest in the World Cup history; it started in November 2022 in Wisła, Poland and concluded in April 2023 in Planica, Slovenia. The women's season also started in Wisła and concluded in Lahti, Finland.

Ryōyū Kobayashi (men's) and Marita Kramer (women's) were the defending overall champions from the previous season.

In this season, the Super Team competition was held for the first time, consisting of only two ski jumpers from each country. It was also the season in which a women's ski flying event was officially held for the first time, although the competition was not part of the World Cup season.

== Map of World Cup hosts ==
(Poland) Wisła	(Finland) Kuusamo	(Germany) Titisee-Neustadt	(Switzerland) Engelberg	(Germany) Oberstdorf	(Germany) Garmisch-Pa
Malinka	Rukatunturi	Hochfirstschanze	Gross-Titlis-Schanze	Schattenberg	Große Olympiaschanze
(Austria) Innsbruck	(Austria) Bischofshofen	(Poland) Zakopane	(Japan) Sapporo	(Austria) Bad Mitterndorf	(Germany) Willingen
Bergiselschanze	Paul-Ausserleitner	Wielka Krokiew	Ōkurayama	Kulm	Mühlenkopfschanze
(United States) Lake Placid	(Romania) Râșnov	(Norway) Oslo	(Norway) Lillehammer	(Norway) Vikersund	(Finland) Lahti
MacKenzie Intervale	Trambulina Valea	Holmenkollbakken	Lysgårdsbakken	Vikersundbakken	Salpausselkä
(Slovenia) Planica	(Austria) Villach	(Slovenia) Ljubno ob Savinji	(Japan) Zaō	(Germany) Hinterzarten	(Austria) Hinzenbach
Letalnica bratov Gorišek	Villacher Alpenarena	Savina	Yamagata	Adler Ski Stadium	Aigner-Schanze
Europe
Germany		Austria United States		Asia	

== World records ==
List of world record distances achieved within this World Cup season.

Date	Athlete	Hill	Round	Place	Metres	Feet
Women
18 March 2023	(Slovenia) Ema Klinec	Vikersundbakken HS240	Training – R2	Vikersund, Norway	203	666
18 March 2023	(Norway) Maren Lundby	Vikersundbakken HS240	Training – R3	Vikersund, Norway	212.5	697
18 March 2023	(Canada) Alexandria Loutitt	Vikersundbakken HS240	Training – R3	Vikersund, Norway	222	728
19 March 2023	(Slovenia) Ema Klinec	Vikersundbakken HS240	Round 1	Vikersund, Norway	226	741

== Men's Individual ==
=== Calendar ===
N – normal hill / L – large hill / F – flying hill
All	#	Date	Place (Hill)	Size	Winner	Second	Third	Overall leader	R.
1056	1	5 November 2022	(Poland) Wisła (Note: All events in Wisła used ice track and plastic cover combined (only time in WC history) due to early start of the winter season (lack of snow).) (Malinka HS134)	L _{763}	(Poland) Dawid Kubacki	(Norway) Halvor Egner Granerud	(Austria) Stefan Kraft	(Poland) Dawid Kubacki	
1057	2	6 November 2022	(Poland) Wisła (Malinka HS134)	L _{764}	(Poland) Dawid Kubacki	(Slovenia) Anže Lanišek	(Norway) Marius Lindvik	(Poland) Dawid Kubacki	
1058	3	26 November 2022	(Finland) Ruka (Rukatunturi HS142)	L _{765}	(Slovenia) Anže Lanišek	(Austria) Stefan Kraft	(Poland) Piotr Żyła	(Poland) Dawid Kubacki	
1059	4	27 November 2022	(Finland) Ruka (Rukatunturi HS142)	L _{766}	(Norway) Halvor Egner Granerud (Austria) Stefan Kraft		(Japan) Naoki Nakamura	(Poland) Dawid Kubacki	
1060	5	9 December 2022	(Germany) Titisee-Neustadt (Hochfirstschanze HS142)	L _{767}	(Slovenia) Anže Lanišek	(Poland) Dawid Kubacki	(Germany) Karl Geiger	(Poland) Dawid Kubacki	
1061	6	11 December 2022	(Germany) Titisee-Neustadt (Hochfirstschanze HS142)	L _{768}	(Poland) Dawid Kubacki	(Slovenia) Anže Lanišek	(Austria) Stefan Kraft	(Poland) Dawid Kubacki	
1062	7	17 December 2022	(Switzerland) Engelberg (Gross-Titlis HS140)	L _{769}	(Slovenia) Anže Lanišek	(Poland) Dawid Kubacki	(Poland) Piotr Żyła	(Poland) Dawid Kubacki	
1063	8	18 December 2022	(Switzerland) Engelberg (Gross-Titlis HS140)	L _{770}	(Poland) Dawid Kubacki	(Austria) Manuel Fettner	(Slovenia) Anže Lanišek	(Poland) Dawid Kubacki	
1064	9	29 December 2022	(Germany) Oberstdorf (Schattenberg HS137)	L _{771}	(Norway) Halvor Egner Granerud	(Poland) Piotr Żyła	(Poland) Dawid Kubacki	(Poland) Dawid Kubacki	
1065	10	1 January 2023	(Germany) Garmisch-Pa (Olympiaschanze HS142)	L _{772}	(Norway) Halvor Egner Granerud	(Slovenia) Anže Lanišek	(Poland) Dawid Kubacki	(Poland) Dawid Kubacki	
1066	11	4 January 2023	(Austria) Innsbruck (Bergiselschanze HS128)	L _{773}	(Poland) Dawid Kubacki	(Norway) Halvor Egner Granerud	(Slovenia) Anže Lanišek	(Poland) Dawid Kubacki	
1067	12	6 January 2023	(Austria) Bischofshofen (Paul-Ausserleitner H142)	L _{774}	(Norway) Halvor Egner Granerud	(Slovenia) Anže Lanišek	(Poland) Dawid Kubacki	(Poland) Dawid Kubacki	
71st Four Hills Tournament Overall (29 December 2022 – 6 January 2023)					(Norway) Halvor Egner Granerud	(Poland) Dawid Kubacki	(Slovenia) Anže Lanišek	4H Tournament	
1068	13	15 January 2023	(Poland) Zakopane (Wielka Krokiew HS140)	L _{775}	(Norway) Halvor Egner Granerud	(Poland) Dawid Kubacki	(Austria) Stefan Kraft	(Poland) Dawid Kubacki	
1069	14	20 January 2023	(Japan) Sapporo (Ōkurayama HS137)	L _{776}	(Japan) Ryōyū Kobayashi	(Poland) Dawid Kubacki	(Norway) Halvor Egner Granerud	(Poland) Dawid Kubacki	
1070	15	21 January 2023	(Japan) Sapporo (Ōkurayama HS137)	L _{777}	(Austria) Stefan Kraft	(Norway) Halvor Egner Granerud	(Japan) Ryōyū Kobayashi	(Poland) Dawid Kubacki	
1071	16	22 January 2023	(Japan) Sapporo (Ōkurayama HS137)	L _{778}	(Japan) Ryōyū Kobayashi	(Norway) Halvor Egner Granerud	(Germany) Markus Eisenbichler	(Poland) Dawid Kubacki	
1072	17	28 January 2023	(Austria) Bad Mitterndorf (Kulm HS235)	F _{135}	(Norway) Halvor Egner Granerud	(Austria) Stefan Kraft	(Slovenia) Domen Prevc	(Norway) Halvor Egner Granerud	
1073	18	29 January 2023	(Austria) Bad Mitterndorf (Kulm HS235)	F _{136}	(Norway) Halvor Egner Granerud	(Slovenia) Timi Zajc	(Austria) Stefan Kraft	(Norway) Halvor Egner Granerud	
1074	19	4 February 2023	(Germany) Willingen (Mühlenkopf HS147)	L _{779}	(Norway) Halvor Egner Granerud	(Slovenia) Anže Lanišek	(Poland) Dawid Kubacki	(Norway) Halvor Egner Granerud	
1075	20	5 February 2023	(Germany) Willingen (Mühlenkopf HS147)	L _{780}	(Norway) Halvor Egner Granerud	(Japan) Ryōyū Kobayashi	(Norway) Daniel Andre Tande	(Norway) Halvor Egner Granerud	
		11 February 2023	(United States) Iron Mountain (Pine Mountain Ski Jump HS133)	L _{cnx}	at original calendar, but FIS cancelled them due to financial problems (both events were rescheduled to Lake Placid on same dates)			—	
		12 February 2003	(United States) Iron Mountain (Pine Mountain Ski Jump HS133)	L _{cnx}	at original calendar, but FIS cancelled them due to financial problems (both events were rescheduled to Lake Placid on same dates)			—	
1076	21	(Note: Men's cancelled individual event in Iron Mountain (11 February) was rescheduled to Lake Placid on the same date.)11 February 2023	(United States) Lake Placid (MacKenzie Int. HS128)	L _{781}	(Germany) Andreas Wellinger	(Japan) Ryōyū Kobayashi	(Austria) Daniel Tschofenig	(Norway) Halvor Egner Granerud	
1077	22	(Note: Men's cancelled individual event in Iron Mountain (12 February) was rescheduled to Lake Placid on the same date.)12 February 2023	(United States) Lake Placid (MacKenzie Int. HS128)	L _{782}	(Norway) Halvor Egner Granerud	(Germany) Andreas Wellinger	(Austria) Stefan Kraft	(Norway) Halvor Egner Granerud	
1078	23	18 February 2023	(Romania) Râșnov (Trambulina HS97)	N _{160}	(Germany) Andreas Wellinger	(Slovenia) Žiga Jelar	(Germany) Karl Geiger	(Norway) Halvor Egner Granerud	
FIS Nordic World Ski Championships 2023 (25 February – 3 March • (Slovenia) Planica)
prologue		10 March 2023	(Norway) Oslo (Holmenkollen HS134)	L _{Qro}	(Poland) Dawid Kubacki	(Slovenia) Timi Zajc	(Austria) Stefan Kraft	—	
1079	24	11 March 2023	(Norway) Oslo (Holmenkollen HS134)	L _{783}	(Slovenia) Anže Lanišek	(Austria) Stefan Kraft	(Germany) Karl Geiger	(Norway) Halvor Egner Granerud	
prologue		12 March 2023	(Norway) Oslo (Holmenkollen HS134)	L _{Qro}	(Norway) Halvor Egner Granerud	(Slovenia) Timi Zajc	(Austria) Stefan Kraft	—	
1080	25	12 March 2023	(Norway) Oslo (Holmenkollen HS134)	L _{784}	(Austria) Stefan Kraft	(Slovenia) Anže Lanišek	(Poland) Dawid Kubacki	(Norway) Halvor Egner Granerud	
prologue		13 March 2023	(Norway) Lillehammer (Lysgårdsbakken HS140)	L _{Qro}	(Norway) Halvor Egner Granerud	(Norway) Johann André Forfang	(Japan) Ryōyū Kobayashi	—	
1081	26	14 March 2023	(Norway) Lillehammer (Lysgårdsbakken HS140)	L _{785}	(Norway) Halvor Egner Granerud	(Austria) Stefan Kraft	(Austria) Manuel Fettner	(Norway) Halvor Egner Granerud	
prologue		15 March 2023	(Norway) Trondheim (Granåsen HS138)	L _{cnx}	cancelled as hills were still under construction (both rescheduled to Lillehammer on 15 and 16 March)			—	
		16 March 2023	(Norway) Trondheim (Granåsen HS138)	L _{cnx}	cancelled as hills were still under construction (both rescheduled to Lillehammer on 15 and 16 March)			—	
prologue		(Note: Men's cancelled prologue in Trondheim (15 March) was rescheduled to Lillehammer on the same date.)15 March 2023	(Norway) Lillehammer (Lysgårdsbakken HS140)	L _{Qro}	(Slovenia) Anže Lanišek	(Norway) Halvor Egner Granerud	(Slovenia) Timi Zajc	—	
1082	27	(Note: Men's icancelled individual event in Trondheim (16 March) was rescheduled to Lillehammer on the same date.)16 March 2023	(Norway) Lillehammer (Lysgårdsbakken HS140)	L _{786}	(Poland) Dawid Kubacki	(Slovenia) Anže Lanišek	(Austria) Daniel Tschofenig	(Norway) Halvor Egner Granerud	
prologue		17 March 2023	(Norway) Vikersund (Vikersundbakken HS240)	F _{Qro}	(Austria) Stefan Kraft	(Austria) Michael Hayböck	(Norway) Halvor Egner Granerud	—	
1083	28	18 March 2023	(Norway) Vikersund (Vikersundbakken HS240)	F _{137}	(Norway) Halvor Egner Granerud	(Austria) Stefan Kraft	(Austria) Daniel Tschofenig	(Norway) Halvor Egner Granerud	
prologue		19 March 2023	(Norway) Vikersund (Vikersundbakken HS240)	F _{Qro}	(Austria) Stefan Kraft	(Norway) Halvor Egner Granerud (Norway) Robert Johansson		—	
1084	29	19 March 2023	(Norway) Vikersund (Vikersundbakken HS240)	F _{138}	(Austria) Stefan Kraft	(Norway) Halvor Egner Granerud	(Slovenia) Anže Lanišek	(Norway) Halvor Egner Granerud	
6th Raw Air Men's Overall (10 – 19 March 2023)					(Norway) Halvor Egner Granerud	(Austria) Stefan Kraft	(Slovenia) Anže Lanišek	Raw Air	
1085	30	(Note: Men's individual event in Lahti (26 March) had only one round due to strong wind.)26 March 2023	(Finland) Lahti (Salpausselkä HS130)	L _{787}	(Japan) Ryōyū Kobayashi	(Austria) Stefan Kraft	(Germany) Karl Geiger	(Norway) Halvor Egner Granerud	
qualifying		30 March 2023	(Slovenia) Planica (Letalnica b. Gorišek HS240)	F _{Qro}	(Slovenia) Anže Lanišek	(Slovenia) Timi Zajc	(Slovenia) Domen Prevc	—	
		31 March 2023	(Slovenia) Planica (Letalnica b. Gorišek HS240)	F _{cnx}	cancelled due to strong wind and rescheduled to 1 April			—	
1086	31	(Note: Men's individual event in Planica (31 March) was rescheduled to 1 April due to strong wind. Only 1 round held due to delayed competition.)1 April 2023	(Slovenia) Planica (Letalnica b. Gorišek HS240)	F _{139}	(Austria) Stefan Kraft	(Slovenia) Anže Lanišek	(Poland) Piotr Żyła	(Norway) Halvor Egner Granerud	
team		1 April 2023	(Slovenia) Planica (Letalnica b. Gorišek HS240)	F _{Tev}	(Austria) Stefan Kraft	(Norway) Halvor Egner Granerud	(Slovenia) Timi Zajc	—	
1087	32	2 April 2023	(Slovenia) Planica (Letalnica b. Gorišek HS240)	F _{140}	(Slovenia) Timi Zajc	(Slovenia) Anže Lanišek	(Austria) Stefan Kraft	(Norway) Halvor Egner Granerud	
5th Planica7 Overall (30 March – 2 April 2023)					(Austria) Stefan Kraft	(Slovenia) Anže Lanišek	(Slovenia) Timi Zajc	Planica7	
44th FIS World Cup Men's Overall (5 November 2022 – 2 April 2023)					(Norway) Halvor Egner Granerud	(Austria) Stefan Kraft	(Slovenia) Anže Lanišek	World Cup Overall	

=== Standings ===
==== Overall ====
Rank	after 32 events	Points
	(Norway) H. Egner Granerud	2128
2	(Austria) Stefan Kraft	1790
3	(Slovenia) Anže Lanišek	1679
4	(Poland) Dawid Kubacki	1592
5	(Japan) Ryōyū Kobayashi	1065
6	(Poland) Piotr Żyła	984
7	(Germany) Andreas Wellinger	902
8	(Slovenia) Timi Zajc	853
9	(Austria) Daniel Tschofenig	851
10	(Austria) Manuel Fettner	755

==== Nations Cup ====
Rank	after 39 events	Points
	Austria	7093
2	Norway	5631
3	Slovenia	5573
4	Poland	4889
5	Germany	4512
6	Japan	2035
7	Switzerland	782
8	Finland	459
9	Italy	415
10	United States	356

==== Prize money ====
Rank	after 42 payouts	CHF
1	(Norway) Halvor Egner Granerud	444,800
2	(Austria) Stefan Kraft	309,100
3	(Slovenia) Anže Lanišek	231,300
4	(Poland) Dawid Kubacki	230,650
5	(Japan) Ryōyū Kobayashi	132,900
6	(Poland) Piotr Żyła	131,650
7	(Germany) Andreas Wellinger	128,350
8	(Austria) Daniel Tschofenig	127,100
9	(Germany) Karl Geiger	110,850
10	(Slovenia) Timi Zajc	108,300

==== Ski flying ====
Rank	after 6 events	Points
	(Austria) Stefan Kraft	480
2	(Norway) Halvor Egner Granerud	450
3	(Slovenia) Anže Lanišek	314
4	(Slovenia) Timi Zajc	311
5	(Slovenia) Domen Prevc	237
6	(Austria) Jan Hörl	213
7	(Poland) Piotr Żyła	210
8	(Japan) Ryōyū Kobayashi	164
9	(Germany) Andreas Wellinger	161
10	(Austria) Daniel Tschofenig	140

==== Four Hills Tournament ====
Rank	after 4 events	Points
	(Norway) Halvor Egner Granerud	1191.2
2	(Poland) Dawid Kubacki	1158.2
3	(Slovenia) Anže Lanišek	1129.0
4	(Poland) Piotr Żyła	1090.0
5	(Poland) Kamil Stoch	1087.9
6	(Austria) Stefan Kraft	1077.5
7	(Austria) Michael Hayböck	1068.6
8	(Austria) Daniel Tschofenig	1061.1
9	(Austria) Jan Hörl	1056.3
10	(Austria) Manuel Fettner	1050.9

==== Raw Air ====
Rank	after 12 events	Points
1	(Norway) Halvor Egner Granerud	2932.0
2	(Austria) Stefan Kraft	2913.8
3	(Slovenia) Anže Lanišek	2784.4
4	(Japan) Ryōyū Kobayashi	2724.4
5	(Austria) Daniel Tschofenig	2721.2
6	(Slovenia) Timi Zajc	2697.7
7	(Austria) Michael Hayböck	2658.2
8	(Poland) Kamil Stoch	2627.5
9	(Austria) Manuel Fettner	2593.3
10	(Norway) Daniel-André Tande	2571.9

==== Planica7 ====
Rank	after 4 events	Points
1	(Austria) Stefan Kraft	1366.8
2	(Slovenia) Anže Lanišek	1352.3
3	(Slovenia) Timi Zajc	1348.9
4	(Norway) Halvor Egner Granerud	1300.3
5	(Slovenia) Domen Prevc	1287.8
6	(Austria) Jan Hörl	1281.0
7	(Poland) Piotr Żyła	1263.6
8	(Austria) Daniel Tschofenig	1229.2
9	(Japan) Ryōyū Kobayashi	1227.9
10	(Norway) Johann André Forfang	1224.5

== Women's Individual ==
=== Calendar ===
N – normal hill / L – large hill
All	#	Date	Place (Hill)	Size	Winner	Second	Third	Overall leader	R.
184	1	5 November 2022	(Poland) Wisła (Malinka HS134)	L _{041}	(Norway) Silje Opseth	(Austria) Marita Kramer	(Austria) Eva Pinkelnig	(Norway) Silje Opseth	
185	2	6 November 2022	(Poland) Wisła (Malinka HS134)	L _{042}	(Austria) Eva Pinkelnig	(Germany) Katharina Althaus	(Sweden) Frida Westman	(Austria) Eva Pinkelnig	
186	3	3 December 2022	(Norway) Lillehammer (Lysgårdsbakken HS98/140)	N _{144}	(Germany) Katharina Althaus	(Austria) Eva Pinkelnig	(Austria) Marita Kramer	(Austria) Eva Pinkelnig	
187	4	4 December 2022	(Norway) Lillehammer (Lysgårdsbakken HS98/140)	L _{043}	(Norway) Silje Opseth	(Norway) Anna Odine Strøm	(Austria) Eva Pinkelnig	(Austria) Eva Pinkelnig	
188	5	11 December 2022	(Germany) Titisee-Neustadt (Hochfirstschanze HS142)	L _{044}	(Germany) Katharina Althaus	(Norway) Silje Opseth	(Slovenia) Urša Bogataj	(Germany) Katharina Althaus	
189	6	28 December 2022	(Austria) Villach (Alpenarena HS98)	N _{145}	(Austria) Eva Pinkelnig	(Norway) Anna Odine Strøm	(Slovenia) Nika Križnar	(Austria) Eva Pinkelnig	
190	7	29 December 2022	(Austria) Villach (Alpenarena HS98)	N _{146}	(Austria) Eva Pinkelnig	(Germany) Katharina Althaus	(Slovenia) Nika Križnar	(Austria) Eva Pinkelnig	
191	8	31 December 2022	(Slovenia) Ljubno (Savina HS94)	N _{147}	(Norway) Anna Odine Strøm	(Austria) Eva Pinkelnig	(Germany) Katharina Althaus	(Austria) Eva Pinkelnig	
192	9	1 January 2023	(Slovenia) Ljubno (Savina HS94)	N _{148}	(Austria) Eva Pinkelnig	(Norway) Anna Odine Strøm	(Germany) Selina Freitag	(Austria) Eva Pinkelnig	
2nd Silvester Tournament Overall (28 December 2022 – 1 January 2023)					(Austria) Eva Pinkelnig	(Norway) Anna Odine Strøm	(Slovenia) Nika Križnar	Silvester Tournament	
193	10	7 January 2023	(Japan) Sapporo (Ōkurayama HS137)	L _{045}	(Germany) Katharina Althaus	(Slovenia) Ema Klinec	(Austria) Eva Pinkelnig	(Austria) Eva Pinkelnig	
194	11	8 January 2023	(Japan) Sapporo (Ōkurayama HS137)	L _{046}	(Norway) Silje Opseth	(Slovenia) Ema Klinec	(Austria) Eva Pinkelnig	(Austria) Eva Pinkelnig	
195	12	13 January 2023	(Japan) Zaō (Yamagata HS102)	N _{149}	(Canada) Alexandria Loutitt	(Austria) Eva Pinkelnig	(Austria) Chiara Kreuzer	(Austria) Eva Pinkelnig	
196	13	15 January 2023	(Japan) Zaō (Yamagata HS102)	N _{150}	(Austria) Eva Pinkelnig	(Germany) Selina Freitag	(Norway) Anna Odine Strøm	(Austria) Eva Pinkelnig	
197	14	28 January 2023	(Germany) Hinterzarten (Adler Ski Stadium HS111)	L _{047}	(Germany) Katharina Althaus	(Slovenia) Ema Klinec	(Canada) Abigail Strate	(Austria) Eva Pinkelnig	
198	15	29 January 2023	(Germany) Hinterzarten (Adler Ski Stadium HS111)	L _{048}	(Norway) Anna Odine Strøm	(Slovenia) Ema Klinec	(Austria) Eva Pinkelnig	(Austria) Eva Pinkelnig	
199	16	4 February 2023	(Germany) Willingen (Mühlenkopf HS147)	L _{049}	(Germany) Katharina Althaus	(Slovenia) Ema Klinec	(Japan) Sara Takanashi	(Austria) Eva Pinkelnig	
200	17	5 February 2023	(Germany) Willingen (Mühlenkopf HS147)	L _{050}	(Japan) Yūki Itō	(Japan) Nozomi Maruyama	(Japan) Sara Takanashi	(Austria) Eva Pinkelnig	
201	18	10 February 2023	(Austria) Hinzenbach (Aigner-Schanze HS90)	N _{151}	(Austria) Eva Pinkelnig	(Slovenia) Ema Klinec	(Slovenia) Nika Prevc	(Austria) Eva Pinkelnig	
202	19	11 February 2023	(Austria) Hinzenbach (Aigner-Schanze HS90)	N _{152}	(Austria) Chiara Kreuzer	(Austria) Eva Pinkelnig	(Japan) Nozomi Maruyama	(Austria) Eva Pinkelnig	
203	20	17 February 2023	(Romania) Râșnov (Trambulina HS97)	N _{153}	(Germany) Katharina Althaus	(Austria) Eva Pinkelnig	(Norway) Eirin Maria Kvandal	(Austria) Eva Pinkelnig	
204	21	(Note: Women's individual event in Râșnov (18 February) had only one round due to strong wind.)18 February 2023	(Romania) Râșnov (Trambulina HS97)	N _{154}	(Norway) Anna Odine Strøm	(Austria) Eva Pinkelnig	(Austria) Julia Mühlbacher	(Austria) Eva Pinkelnig	
FIS Nordic World Ski Championships 2023 (23 February – 1 March • (Slovenia) Planica)
prologue		10 March 2023	(Norway) Oslo (Holmenkollen HS134)	L _{Qro}	(Slovenia) Ema Klinec	(Japan) Yūki Itō	(Norway) Anna Odine Strøm	—	
205	22	11 March 2023	(Norway) Oslo (Holmenkollen HS134)	L _{051}	(Austria) Chiara Kreuzer	(Slovenia) Ema Klinec	(Norway) Anna Odine Strøm	(Austria) Eva Pinkelnig	
prologue		12 March 2023	(Norway) Oslo (Holmenkollen HS134)	L _{Qro}	(Norway) Anna Odine Strøm	(Slovenia) Ema Klinec	(Austria) Chiara Kreuzer	—	
206	23	12 March 2023	(Norway) Oslo (Holmenkollen HS134)	L _{052}	(Slovenia) Ema Klinec	(Austria) Chiara Kreuzer	(Norway) Anna Odine Strøm	(Austria) Eva Pinkelnig	
prologue		13 March 2023	(Norway) Lillehammer (Lysgårdsbakken HS140)	L _{Qro}	(Japan) Yūki Itō	(Norway) Silje Opseth	(Germany) Katharina Althaus	—	
207	24	13 March 2023	(Norway) Lillehammer (Lysgårdsbakken HS140)	L _{053}	(Norway) Silje Opseth	(Germany) Selina Freitag	(Slovenia) Ema Klinec	(Austria) Eva Pinkelnig	
prologue		14 March 2023	(Norway) Lillehammer (Lysgårdsbakken HS140)	L _{Qro}	(Canada) Alexandria Loutitt	(Germany) Katharina Althaus (Slovenia) Ema Klinec		—	
208	25	15 March 2023	(Norway) Lillehammer (Lysgårdsbakken HS140)	L _{054}	(Germany) Katharina Althaus	(Canada) Alexandria Loutitt	(Austria) Eva Pinkelnig	(Austria) Eva Pinkelnig	
prologue		15 March 2023	(Norway) Trondheim (Granåsen HS138)	L _{cnx}	cancelled as hills were still under construction (both rescheduled to Lillehammer on 14 and 15 March)			—	
		16 March 2023	(Norway) Trondheim (Granåsen HS138)	L _{cnx}	cancelled as hills were still under construction (both rescheduled to Lillehammer on 14 and 15 March)			—	
FIS		(Note: Women's individual ski flying event in Vikersund (19 March) did not count for World Cup (categorized as FIS competition).)19 March 2023	(Norway) Vikersund (Vikersundbakken HS240)	F _{FIS}	(Slovenia) Ema Klinec	(Norway) Silje Opseth	(Japan) Yūki Itō	—	
4th Raw Air Women's Overall (10 – 19 March 2023)					(Slovenia) Ema Klinec	(Germany) Katharina Althaus	(Germany) Selina Freitag	Raw Air	
209	26	24 March 2023	(Finland) Lahti (Salpausselkä HS130)	L _{055}	(Japan) Yūki Itō	(Norway) Anna Odine Strøm	(Germany) Katharina Althaus	(Austria) Eva Pinkelnig	
12th FIS World Cup Women's Overall (5 November 2022 – 24 March 2023)					(Austria) Eva Pinkelnig	(Germany) Katharina Althaus	(Slovenia) Ema Klinec	World Cup Overall	

=== Standings ===
==== Overall ====
Rank	after 26 events	Points
	(Austria) Eva Pinkelnig	1662
2	(Germany) Katharina Althaus	1497
3	(Slovenia) Ema Klinec	1281
4	(Norway) Anna Odine Strøm	1278
5	(Germany) Selina Freitag	958
6	(Austria) Chiara Kreuzer	924
7	(Norway) Silje Opseth	837
8	(Japan) Yūki Itō	766
9	(Slovenia) Nika Križnar	741
10	(Japan) Sara Takanashi	674

==== Nations Cup ====
Rank	after 29 events	Points
	Austria	4154
2	Germany	3904
3	Norway	3720
4	Slovenia	3184
5	Japan	2888
6	Canada	1326
7	France	751
8	Italy	516
9	Finland	323
10	Romania	180

==== Prize money ====
Rank	after 31 payouts	CHF
1	(Austria) Eva Pinkelnig	98 980
2	(Slovenia) Ema Klinec	96 240
3	(Germany) Katharina Althaus	83 550
4	(Norway) Anna Odine Strøm	63 040
5	(Germany) Selina Freitag	50 070
6	(Norway) Silje Opseth	44 320
7	(Austria) Chiara Kreuzer	42 570
8	(Japan) Yūki Itō	34 140
9	(Slovenia) Nika Križnar	33 640
10	(Japan) Sara Takanashi	30 770

==== Silvester Tournament ====
Rank	after 4 events	Points
1	(Austria) Eva Pinkelnig	1030.3
2	(Norway) Anna Odine Strøm	1004.0
3	(Slovenia) Nika Križnar	980.3
4	(Germany) Selina Freitag	972.8
5	(Germany) Katharina Althaus	970.9
6	(Slovenia) Ema Klinec	964.5
7	(Germany) Anna Rupprecht	959.2
8	(Canada) Alexandria Loutitt	951.7
9	(Japan) Sara Takanashi	943.8
10	(Austria) Marita Kramer	940.5

==== Raw Air ====
Rank	after 9 events	Points
1	(Slovenia) Ema Klinec	1859.6
2	(Germany) Katharina Althaus	1771.5
3	(Germany) Selina Freitag	1704.3
4	(Norway) Silje Opseth	1683.3
5	(Slovenia) Nika Križnar	1653.5
6	(Austria) Chiara Kreuzer	1649.7
7	(Canada) Alexandria Loutitt	1647.6
8	(Norway) Anna Odine Strøm	1645.0
9	(Austria) Eva Pinkelnig	1639.3
10	(Norway) Maren Lundby	1630.7

== Team events ==
=== Calendar ===
N – normal hill / L – large hill / F – flying hill
All	No.	Date	Place (Hill)	Event	Winner	Second	Third	Ref.
Mixed team
6	1	10 December 2022	(Germany) Titisee-Neustadt (Hochfirstschanze HS142)	L _{003}	Austria Marita Kramer; Michael Hayböck; Eva Pinkelnig; Stefan Kraft	Norway Anna Odine Strøm; Bendik Jakobsen Heggli; Silje Opseth; Halvor Egner Granerud	Germany Selina Freitag; Constantin Schmid; Katharina Althaus; Karl Geiger	
7	2	(Note: Mixed team event in Willingen (3 February) had only one round due to strong wind.)3 February 2023	(Germany) Willingen (Mühlenkopfschanze HS147)	L _{004}	Norway Anna Odine Strøm; Marius Lindvik; Silje Opseth; Halvor Egner Granerud	Austria Chiara Kreuzer; Jan Hörl; Eva Pinkelnig; Stefan Kraft	Germany Selina Freitag; Karl Geiger; Katharina Althaus; Andreas Wellinger	
Women's super team
1	1	14 January 2023	(Japan) Zaō (Yamagata HS102)	N _{001}	Austria Chiara Kreuzer; Eva Pinkelnig	Norway Thea Minyan Bjørseth; Anna Odine Strøm	Germany Katharina Althaus; Selina Freitag	
Men's team
117	1	14 January 2023	(Poland) Zakopane (Wielka Krokiew HS140)	L _{090}	Austria Daniel Tschofenig; Michael Hayböck; Manuel Fettner; Stefan Kraft	Poland Kamil Stoch; Piotr Żyła; Paweł Wąsek; Dawid Kubacki	Germany Markus Eisenbichler; Philipp Raimund; Karl Geiger; Andreas Wellinger	
118	2	25 March 2023	(Finland) Lahti (Salpausselkä HS130)	L _{091}	Austria Daniel Tschofenig; Michael Hayböck; Jan Hörl; Stefan Kraft	Slovenia Lovro Kos; Domen Prevc; Timi Zajc; Anže Lanišek	Poland Piotr Żyła; Paweł Wąsek; Aleksander Zniszczoł; Kamil Stoch	
119	3	1 April 2023	(Slovenia) Planica (Letalnica bratov Gorišek HS240)	F _{026}	Austria Daniel Tschofenig; Michael Hayböck; Jan Hörl; Stefan Kraft	Slovenia Lovro Kos; Domen Prevc; Timi Zajc; Anže Lanišek	Norway Johann André Forfang; Bendik Jakobsen Heggli; Robert Johansson; Halvor Egner Granerud	
Men's super team
1	1	11 February 2023	(United States) Lake Placid (MacKenzie Int. HS128)	L _{001}	Poland Piotr Żyła; Dawid Kubacki	Austria Daniel Tschofenig; Stefan Kraft	Japan Naoki Nakamura; Ryōyū Kobayashi	
2	2	19 February 2023	(Romania) Râșnov (Trambulina HS97)	N _{001}	Germany Karl Geiger; Andreas Wellinger	Slovenia Maksim Bartolj; Žiga Jelar	Austria Philipp Aschenwald; Clemens Aigner	

== Podium table by nation ==
Table showing the World Cup podium places (gold–1st place, silver–2nd place, bronze–3rd place) by the countries represented by the athletes.

Rank	Nation	Gold	Silver	Bronze	Total
1	Norway	20	12	8	40
2	Austria	18	17	20	55
3	Germany	10	5	12	27
4	Poland	7	6	9	22
5	Slovenia	6	21	9	36
6	Japan	5	3	6	14
7	Canada	1	1	1	3
8	Sweden	0	0	1	1
Totals (8 entries)		67	65	66	198

== Points distribution ==
The table shows the number of points won in the 2022/23 FIS Ski Jumping World Cup for men and women.

Place	1	2	3	4	5	6	7	8	9	10	11	12	13	14	15	16	17	18	19	20	21	22	23	24	25	26	27	28	29	30
Individual	100	80	60	50	45	40	36	32	29	26	24	22	20	18	16	15	14	13	12	11	10	9	8	7	6	5	4	3	2	1
Team	400	350	300	250	200	150	100	50
Mixed Team	200	175	150	125	100	75	50	25
Super Team	200	160	120	100	80	70	60	50	40	30	20	10

== Qualifications ==
In case the number of participating athletes is 50 (men) / 40 (women) or lower, a Prologue competition round must be organized. In the Women's Silvester Tournament qualifies 50 jumpers.

=== Men ===
No.	Place	Qualifications	Competition	Size	Winner	Ref.
1	(Poland) Wisła	4 November 2022	5 November 2022	L	(Poland) Dawid Kubacki	
2	(Poland) Wisła	6 November 2022		L	(Poland) Dawid Kubacki	
3	(Finland) Ruka	26 November 2022		L	(Slovenia) Anže Lanišek	
4	(Finland) Ruka	27 November 2022		L	(Norway) Halvor Egner Granerud	
5	(Germany) Titisee-Neustadt	9 December 2022		L	(Poland) Dawid Kubacki	
6	(Germany) Titisee-Neustadt	11 December 2022		L	(Poland) Dawid Kubacki	
7	(Switzerland) Engelberg	16 December 2022	17 December 2022	L	(Norway) Halvor Egner Granerud	
8	(Switzerland) Engelberg	18 December 2022		L	(Austria) Manuel Fettner	
9	(Germany) Oberstdorf	28 December 2022	29 December 2022	L	(Norway) Halvor Egner Granerud	
10	(Germany) Garmisch-Pa	31 December 2022	1 January 2023	L	(Poland) Dawid Kubacki	
11	(Austria) Innsbruck	3 January 2023	4 January 2023	L	(Poland) Dawid Kubacki	
12	(Austria) Bischofshofen	5 January 2023	6 January 2023	L	(Norway) Halvor Egner Granerud	
13	(Poland) Zakopane	13 January 2023	15 January 2023	L	(Austria) Daniel Tschofenig	
14	(Japan) Sapporo	20 January 2023		L	(Norway) Halvor Egner Granerud	
15	(Japan) Sapporo	21 January 2023		L	(Poland) Dawid Kubacki	
16	(Japan) Sapporo	22 January 2023		L	(Japan) Ryōyū Kobayashi	
17	(Austria) Bad Mitterndorf	27 January 2023	28 January 2023	F	(Austria) Stefan Kraft	
18	(Austria) Bad Mitterndorf	29 January 2023		F	(Austria) Stefan Kraft	
19	(Germany) Willingen	4 February 2023		L	(Germany) Markus Eisenbichler	
20	(Germany) Willingen	5 February 2023		L	(Norway) Halvor Egner Granerud	
21	(United States) Lake Placid	11 February 2023		L	(Germany) Andreas Wellinger	
22	(United States) Lake Placid	12 February 2023		L	(Poland) Dawid Kubacki	
23	(Romania) Râșnov	17 February 2023	18 February 2023	N	(Germany) Andreas Wellinger (Prologue instead Q)	
24	(Norway) Oslo	10 March 2023	11 March 2023	L	(Poland) Dawid Kubacki	
25	(Norway) Oslo	12 March 2023		L	(Norway) Halvor Egner Granerud	
26	(Norway) Lillehammer	13 March 2023	14 March 2023	L	(Norway) Halvor Egner Granerud	
27	(Norway) Lillehammer	15 March 2023	16 March 2023	L	(Slovenia) Anže Lanišek	
28	(Norway) Vikersund	17 March 2023	18 March 2023	F	(Austria) Stefan Kraft	
29	(Norway) Vikersund	19 March 2023		F	(Austria) Stefan Kraft	
30	(Finland) Lahti	26 March 2023		L	(Austria) Daniel Tschofenig	
31	(Slovenia) Planica	30 March 2023	1 April 2023	F	(Slovenia) Anže Lanišek	

=== Women ===
No.	Place	Qualifications	Competition	Size	Winner	Ref.
1	(Poland) Wisła	4 November 2022	5 November 2022	L	(Slovenia) Ema Klinec	
2	(Poland) Wisła	6 November 2022		L	(Norway) Silje Opseth	
3	(Norway) Lillehammer	2 December 2022	3 December 2022	N	(Austria) Eva Pinkelnig	
4	(Norway) Lillehammer	4 December 2022		L	(Slovenia) Nika Križnar	
5	(Germany) Titisee-Neustadt	11 December 2022		L	(Germany) Katharina Althaus	
6	(Austria) Villach	27 December 2022	28 December 2022	N	(Austria) Eva Pinkelnig	
7	(Austria) Villach	29 December 2022		N	(Germany) Katharina Althaus	
8	(Slovenia) Ljubno	30 December 2022	31 December 2022	N	(Canada) Alexandria Loutitt	
9	(Slovenia) Ljubno	1 January 2023		N	(Norway) Anna Odine Strøm	
10	(Japan) Sapporo	6 January 2023	7 January 2023	L	(Germany) Katharina Althaus	
11	(Japan) Sapporo	8 January 2023		L	(Norway) Silje Opseth	
12	(Japan) Zaō	12 January 2023	13 January 2023	N	(Japan) Sara Takanashi	
13	(Japan) Zaō	15 January 2023		N	(Japan) Yūki Itō	
14	(Germany) Hinterzarten	28 January 2023		L	(Slovenia) Ema Klinec	
15	(Germany) Hinterzarten	29 January 2023		L	(Slovenia) Ema Klinec	
16	(Germany) Willingen	3 February 2023	4 February 2023	L	(Germany) Katharina Althaus (prologue instead Q)	
17	(Germany) Willingen	5 February 2023		L	cancelled due to strong wind (prologue instead Q)	
18	(Austria) Hinzenbach	10 February 2023		N	(Canada) Alexandria Loutitt	
19	(Austria) Hinzenbach	11 February 2023		N	(Austria) Eva Pinkelnig	
20	(Romania) Râșnov	16 February 2023	17 February 2023	N	(Germany) Katharina Althaus	
21	(Romania) Râșnov	18 February 2023		N	(Germany) Katharina Althaus	
22	(Norway) Oslo	10 March 2023	11 March 2023	L	(Slovenia) Ema Klinec	
23	(Norway) Oslo	12 March 2023		L	(Norway) Anna Odine Strøm	
24	(Norway) Lillehammer	13 March 2023		L	(Japan) Yūki Itō	
25	(Norway) Lillehammer	14 March 2023	15 March 2023	L	(Canada) Alexandria Loutitt	

== Prize money distribution ==
The total prize money for each individual World Cup event was 79,000 Swiss franc (CHF) for men and 28,500 CHF for women. Men's qualification winners also received an additional 3,000 CHF on normal and large hills, and 5,000 CHF on ski flying hills.

=== Men ===
Rank	CHF
1st	12,000
2nd	9,500
3rd	7,500
4th	6,000
5th	5,200
6th	4,600
7th	3,600
8th	3,200
9th	2,900
10th	2,600
11th	2,400
12th	2,200
13th	2,000
14th	1,800
15th	1,600
16th	1,500
17th	1,400
18th	1,300
19th	1,200
20th	1,100
21st	1,000
22nd	900
23rd	800
24th	700
25th	600
26th	500
27th	400
28th	300
29th	200
30th	100

=== Women ===
Rank	CHF
1st	4,000
2nd	3,200
3rd	2,400
4th	2,000
5th	1,800
6th	1,600
7th	1,440
8th	1,280
9th	1,160
10th	1,040
11th	960
12th	880
13th	800
14th	720
15th	640
16th	600
17th	560
18th	520
19th	480
20th	440
21st	400
22nd	360
23rd	320
24th	280
25th	240

=== Team events ===
Rank	Men / Mixed	Super team	
Rank	Men / Mixed	Women	Men
1st	6,750 CHF	1,500 CHF	11,000 CHF
2nd	4,250 CHF	1,000 CHF	7,500 CHF
3rd	3,000 CHF	750 CHF	5,000 CHF
4th	2,000 CHF	600 CHF	4,000 CHF
5th	1,500 CHF	500 CHF	3,000 CHF
6th	1,000 CHF	450 CHF	2,500 CHF
7th	500 CHF	400 CHF	2,000 CHF
8th	250 CHF	300 CHF	1,500 CHF
9th	not awarded		1,000 CHF
10th	not awarded		500 CHF
11th	not awarded		350 CHF
12th	not awarded		150 CHF
Total	77,000 CHF	11,100 CHF	77,000 CHF

=== Tournaments ===
	Champion	Second	Third
Raw Air
Women	45,000 CHF	25,000 CHF	10,000 CHF
Men	35,000 CHF	17,500 CHF	7,500 CHF
Four Hills Tournament
Men	100,000 CHF	not awarded	
Silvester Tournament
Women	€20,000	not awarded	
Planica 7
Men	20,000 CHF	not awarded	

== Achievements ==
First World Cup career victory

Men

Women

- (Norway) Anna Odine Strøm (24), in her 10th season – the WC 8 in Ljubno
- (Canada) Alexandria Loutitt (19), in her 3rd season – the WC 12 in Zaō

First World Cup podium

Men

- (Japan) Naoki Nakamura (26), in his 8th season – the WC 4 in Ruka – 3rd place
- (Austria) Daniel Tschofenig (20), in his 3rd season – the WC 21 in Lake Placid – 3rd place

Women

- (Canada) Alexandria Loutitt (19), in her 3rd season – the WC 12 in Zaō – 1st place
- (Japan) Nozomi Maruyama (24), in her 6th season – the WC 17 in Willingen – 2nd place
- (Sweden) Frida Westman (21), in her 2nd season – the WC 2 in Wisła – 3rd place
- (Germany) Selina Freitag (21), in her 5th season – the WC 9 in Ljubno – 3rd place
- (Canada) Abigail Strate (21), in her 7th season – the WC 14 in Hinterzarten – 3rd place
- (Slovenia) Nika Prevc (17), in her 2nd season – the WC 18 in Hinzenbach – 3rd place
- (Austria) Julia Mühlbacher (18), in her 4th season – the WC 21 in Râșnov – 3rd place

Number of wins this season (in brackets are all-time wins)

Men

- (Norway) Halvor Egner Granerud – 12 (25)
- (Poland) Dawid Kubacki – 6 (11)
- (Austria) Stefan Kraft – 5 (30)
- (Slovenia) Anže Lanišek – 4 (5)
- (Japan) Ryōyū Kobayashi – 3 (30)
- (Germany) Andreas Wellinger – 2 (5)
- (Slovenia) Timi Zajc – 1 (3)

Women

- (Germany) Katharina Althaus – 7 (15)
- (Austria) Eva Pinkelnig – 6 (9)
- (Norway) Silje Opseth – 4 (5)
- (Norway) Anna Odine Strøm – 3 (3)
- (Austria) Chiara Kreuzer – 2 (8)
- (Japan) Yūki Itō – 2 (7)
- (Slovenia) Ema Klinec – 1 (2)
- (Canada) Alexandria Loutitt – 1 (1)

== Retirements ==
The following ski jumpers retired during or after the 2022–23 season:

Men

- (Germany) Moritz Baer
- (Slovenia) Tilen Bartol
- (Norway) Joacim Ødegård Bjøreng
- (France) Mathis Contamine
- (Norway) Sander Vossan Eriksen
- (Norway) Anders Fannemel
- (United States) Patrick Gasienica
- (Poland) Stefan Hula
- (Slovenia) Bor Pavlovčič
- (Czech Republic) Filip Sakala
- (Germany) David Siegel
- (Japan) Shohei Tochimoto

Women

- (Germany) Michelle Göbel
- (Austria) Daniela Iraschko-Stolz
- (Poland) Kinga Rajda
- (Slovenia) Nika Vetrih

== See also ==
- 2022 FIS Ski Jumping Grand Prix
- 2022–23 FIS Ski Jumping Continental Cup
- 2022–23 FIS Cup (ski jumping)
