= Kacper Juroszek =

Polish ski jumper (born 2001)

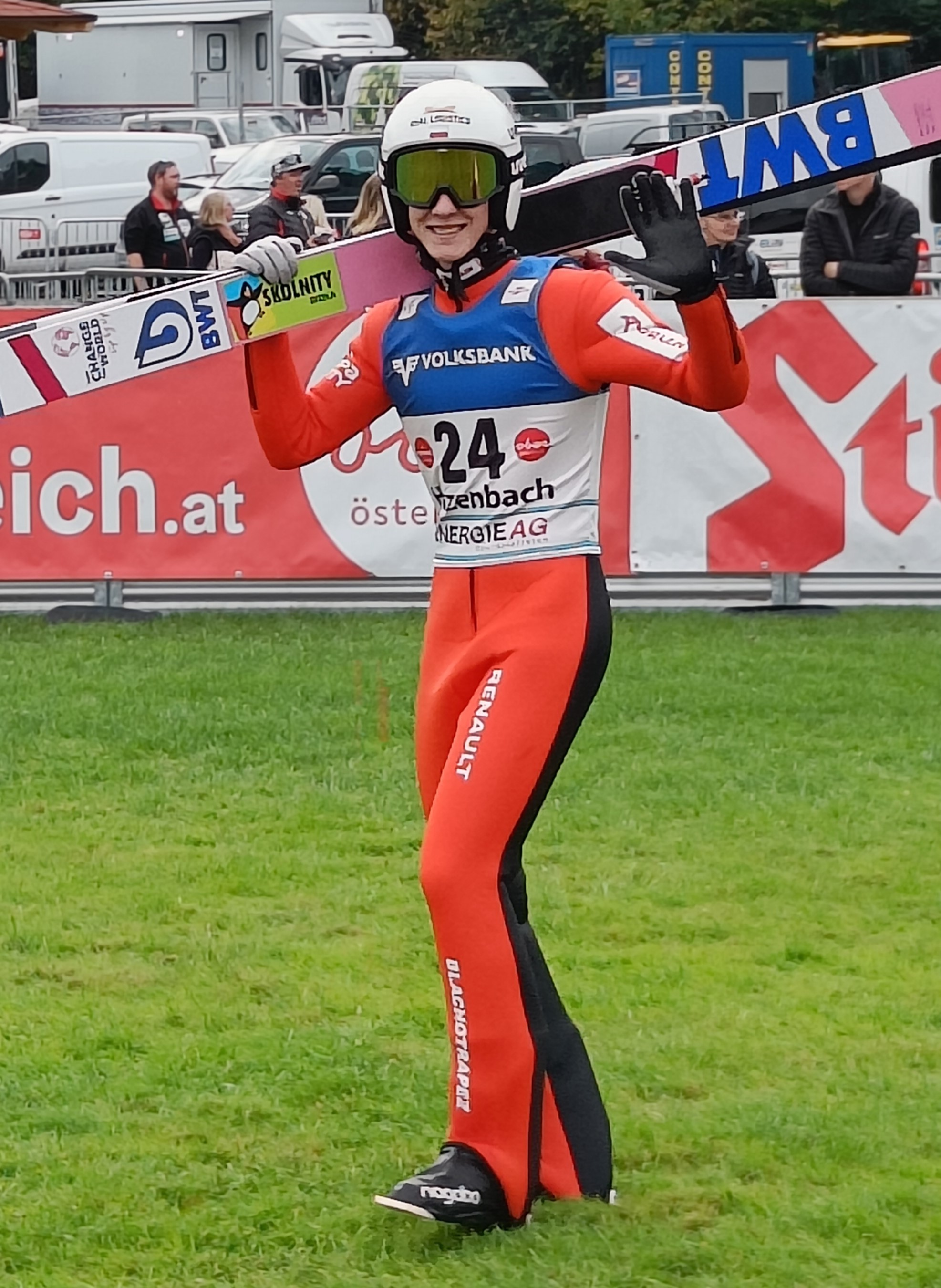
- Kacper Juroszek (2022)

Personal information
- Full name: Kacper Juroszek
- Nationality: Poland
- Born: 5 June 2001 (age 25) Cieszyn, Poland

Sport
- Sport: Skiing
- Club: AZS AWF Katowice

World Cup career
- Seasons: 2022–present
- Updated on 16 February 2025

Kacper Juroszek (born 5 June 2001 in Cieszyn) is a Polish ski jumper representing the sports club AZS AWF Katowice.

== Career ==
Juroszek debuted at the 2016/17 FIS Cup in Zakopane in January. He got his first points in July 2017 in Villach. At the 2018 Nordic Junior World Ski Championships he finished 29th individually and 5th in Team. In March 2018 he debuted at the FIS Ski Jumping Continental Cup finishing 54th.

At the 2019 Nordic Junior World Ski Championships he finished 48th individually and 6th in Team. During the Summer Polish Championship in 2020 he got the Gold Medal in Team Jumping.

He presented himself three times at the 2019 FIS Ski Jumping Grand Prix with his best performance being at Hakuba when he finished 33rd. On 22 November 2019 he debuted at the Qualifications for the 2019-20 FIS Ski Jumping World Cup in Wisla, but failed to qualify for the main event. He debuted in the FIS Ski Jumping World Cup during the 2021-22 season when he finished 32nd in Lahti.

During the 2022 FIS Ski Jumping Grand Prix, he accumulated points three times during the course of the Tournament with his best finish at 9th place in Hinzenbach. During the Winter Part of the season 2022/23, he got into the FIS World Cup twice, in Wisla finishing 32nd and in Râșnov finishing 14th and getting his first World Cup points. At the 2022–23 FIS Ski Jumping Continental Cup his highest position was 13th.

He participed in the Ski Jumping European Games 2023 in which he finished 27th on the Normal Hill. During the 2023 FIS Ski Jumping Grand Prix, he accumulated points seven times and his best finish was 17th.

== World Cup ==
Season standings

Season	Overall	Ski-Flying	Four Hills Tournament	Raw Air
2021–22	—	—	—	47
2022–23	57	—	—	—
2024–25	—	—	—	—

Individual starts

Season	1	2	3	4	5	6	7	8	9	10	11	12	13	14	15	16	17	18	19	20	21	22	23	24	25	26	27	28	29	30	31	Points
2021/22	Nizhny Tagil HS134	Nizhny Tagil HS134	Kuusamo HS142	Kuusamo HS142	Wisła HS134	Klingenthal HS140	Klingenthal HS140	Engelberg HS140	Engelberg HS140	Oberstdorf HS137	Garmisch-Partenkirchen HS142	Innsbruck HS130	Bischofshofen HS142	Bischofshofen HS142	Zakopane HS140	Sapporo HS137	Sapporo HS137	Sapporo HS137	Titisee-Neustadt HS142	Titisee-Neustadt HS142	Willingen HS145	Willingen HS145	Lahti HS130	Lahti HS130	Lillehammer HS140	Oslo HS134	Oslo HS134	Oberstdorf HS137	Oberstdorf HS137	Planica HS240	Planica HS240	0
2021/22	—	—	—	—	—	—	—	—	—	—	—	—	—	—	—	—	—	—	—	—	—	—	32	40	36	—	35	—	—	—	—	0
2022/23	Wisła HS134	Wisła HS134	Kuusamo HS142	Kuusamo HS142	Titisee-Neustadt HS142	Titisee-Neustadt HS142	Engelberg HS140	Engelberg HS140	Oberstdorf HS137	Garmisch-Partenkirchen HS142	Innsbruck HS130	Bischofshofen HS142	Zakopane HS140	Sapporo HS137	Sapporo HS137	Sapporo HS137	Bad Mittendorf HS235	Bad Mittendorf HS235	Willingen HS145	Lake Placid HS128	Lake Placid HS128	Râșnov HS97	Oslo HS134	Oslo HS134	Lillehammer HS140	Lillehammer HS140	Vikersund HS240	Vikersund HS240	Lahti HS130	Planica HS240	Planica HS240	18
2022/23	—	31	—	—	—	—	—	—	—	—	—	—	—	—	—	—	—	—	—	—	—	14	—	—	—	—	—	—	—	—	—	18
2024/25	Lillehammer HS140	Lillehammer HS140	Kuusamo HS142	Kuusamo HS142	Wisła HS134	Wisła HS134	Titisee-Neustadt HS142	Titisee-Neustadt HS142	Engelberg HS140	Engelberg HS140	Oberstdorf HS137	Garmisch-Partenkirchen HS142	Innsbruck HS130	Bischofshofen HS142	Zakopane HS104	Oberstdorf HS137	Oberstdorf HS137	Willingen HS145	Willingen HS145	Lake Placid HS128	Lake Placid HS128	Sapporo HS137	Sapporo HS137	Oslo HS134	Vikersund HS240	Vikersund HS240	Lahti HS130	Planica HS240	Planica HS240			0
2024/25	—	—	—	—	—	—	—	—	—	—	—	—	—	—	—	—	—	—	—	—	—	36	47									0
