= Frida Westman =

Swedish ski jumper (born 2001)

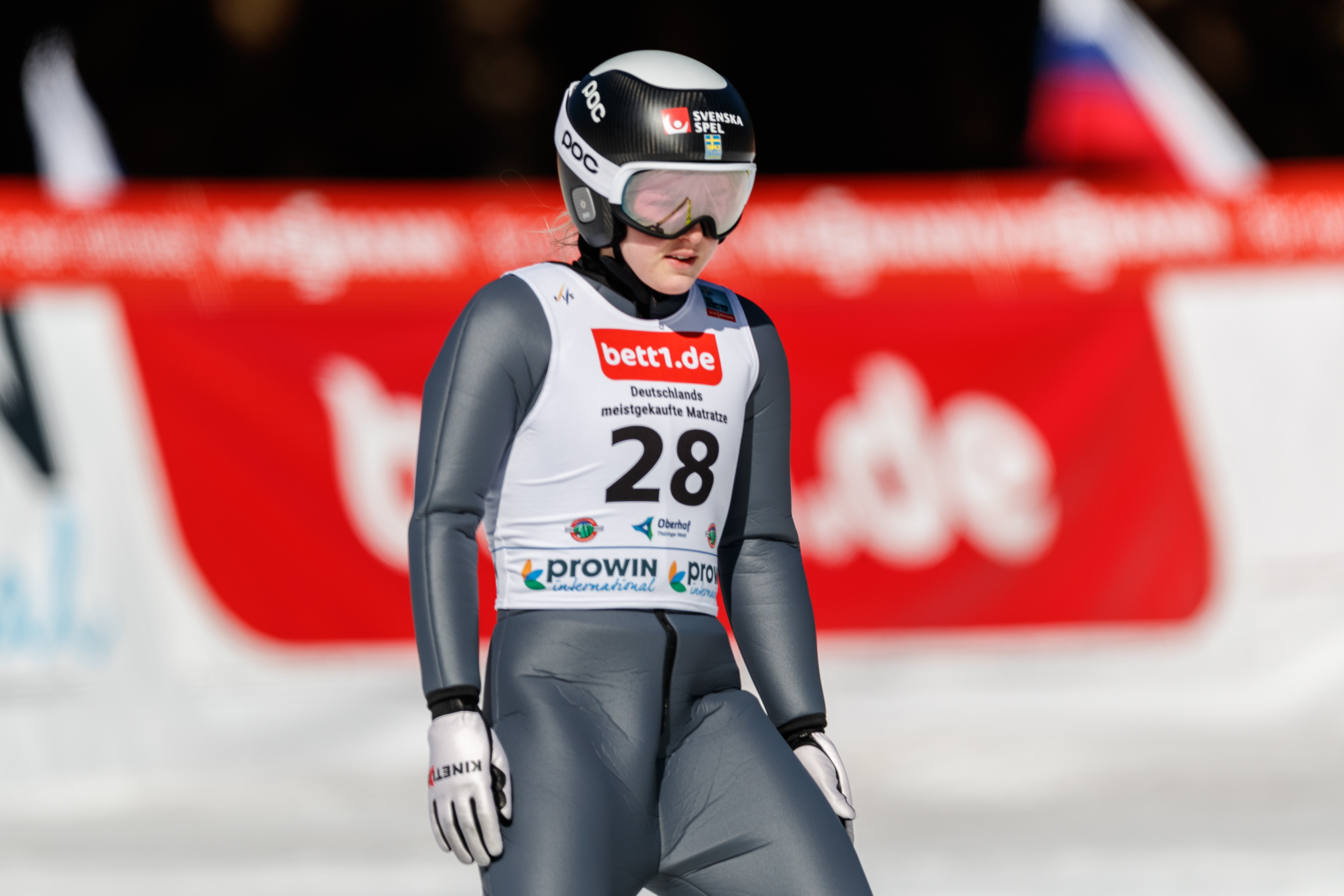
- at World Cup in Oberhof, Germany (2022)

Personal information
- Nationality: Sweden
- Born: 10 January 2001 (age 25) Örnsköldsvik, Sweden

Sport
- Sport: Skiing
- Club: IF Friska Viljor

World Cup career
- Indiv. starts: 7
- Indiv. podiums: 1

Achievements and titles
- Personal bests: 225 m (738 ft); Vikersund, 21 March 2026
- Updated on 22 March 2026

Frida Westman (born 10 January 2001) is a Swedish ski jumper who competed at the 2022 Winter Olympics. She was the first Swedish female ski jumper at an Olympic Games. Westman has the best finish by any Swedish female ski jumper at a FIS Ski Jumping World Cup event.

== Career ==
Westman competes for IF Friska Viljor, and has been coached by Andreas Arén and Isak Grimholm.

In 2015, Westman won the Swedish Youth Championship 55 metre hill event. In 2019, she suffered two cruciate ligament injuries. In September 2020, she won two Norway Cup events in Lillehammer. In February 2021, she made her FIS Ski Jumping World Cup debut in an event in Oberstdorf, Germany. She finished 35th in the competition. At the 2021–22 FIS Ski Jumping Continental Cup summer event in Oslo, Norway, she finished fifth. At the 2021–22 FIS Ski Jumping World Cup, Westman finished 18th in the event in Nizhny Tagil, Russia. It was the best ever result for a Swedish women at a World Cup event. The weekend after, she finished 13th in an event in Lillehammer, Norway, and she later came 10th in the event in Ramsau am Dachstein, Austria.

Westman was selected for the 2022 Winter Olympics. She was the first Swedish female ski jumper at any Olympics, and the first Swedish ski jumper of any gender since 1994. She finished 16th overall in the normal hill event. Later in the month, she finished ninth in the training competition prior to the World Cup event in Aigner-Schanze, Austria, and finished fourth in the two competitive events at that location. In April 2022, Westman was critical of the Federation Internationale de Ski for not allowing women to compete in ski flying. She came second in a 2022–23 FIS Ski Jumping Continental Cup summer event in Lillehammer, Norway.

== Personal life ==
Westman is from Örnsköldsvik, Sweden. She now lives in Trondheim, Norway, having moved to the country in August 2019 to attend a school focused on ski jumping. Her father Magnus Westman competed in ski jumping at the 1992 Winter Olympics and 1994 Winter Olympics.
