= 2022 FIS Ski Jumping Grand Prix =

Ski Jumping Grand Prix

Discipline	Men	Women
Overall	(Poland) Dawid Kubacki	(Slovenia) Urša Bogataj
Nations Cup	Poland	Slovenia

Competition
Edition	29th	11th
Locations	5	4
Individual	6	5
Team	1	–
Mixed	2	2

The 2022 FIS Ski Jumping Grand Prix was the 29th Summer Grand Prix season in ski jumping for men and the 11th for women.

For the first time since this season (both in summer and winter), the “Super Team” is taking place – a duo competition. It will consist of three competitions in which each nation can enter only one team. All submitted duos will take part in the first round, twelve teams will advance to the second round, and the eight best teams after two series will be shown in the final.

== Map of Grand Prix hosts ==
All 5 locations hosting world cup events for men (5), for women (4) and shared (4) in this season.

(Poland) Wisła	(France) Courchevel	(Romania) Râșnov	(Austria) Hinzenbach	(Germany) Klingenthal
Malinka	Tremplin du Praz	Trambulină Valea Cărbunării	Aigner-Schanze	Vogtland Arena
Europe

Shared (Men and Women) Men Only

== Men ==
Grand Prix history in real time

Total	LH	NH	Winners
219	169	50	77

after LH event in Klingenthal (2 October 2022)

=== Calendar ===
NH – normal hill / LH – large hill
Num	Season	Date	Place	Hill	Event	Winner	Second	Third	Yellow bib	Ref.
214	1	23 July 2022	(Poland) Wisła	Malinka HS134	LH _{166}	(Poland) Dawid Kubacki	(Poland) Kamil Stoch	(Germany) Karl Geiger	(Poland) Dawid Kubacki	
215	2	24 July 2022	(Poland) Wisła	Malinka HS134	LH _{167}	(Poland) Kamil Stoch	(Poland) Dawid Kubacki	(Poland) Jakub Wolny	(Poland) Dawid Kubacki (Poland) Kamil Stoch	
216	3	7 August 2022	(France) Courchevel	Tremplin du Praz HS135	LH _{168}	(Austria) Manuel Fettner	(Switzerland) Gregor Deschwanden	(Austria) Stefan Kraft	(Poland) Dawid Kubacki (Poland) Kamil Stoch	
217	4	17 September 2022	(Romania) Râșnov	Trambulina Valea Cărbunării HS97	NH _{049}	(Japan) Ren Nikaido	(Poland) Paweł Wąsek	(Bulgaria) Vladimir Zografski	(Poland) Dawid Kubacki (Poland) Kamil Stoch	
218	5	25 September 2022	(Austria) Hinzenbach	Aigner-Schanze HS90	NH _{050}	(Poland) Dawid Kubacki	(Slovenia) Anže Lanišek	(Austria) Manuel Fettner	(Poland) Dawid Kubacki	
219	6	2 October 2022	(Germany) Klingenthal	Vogtland Arena HS140	LH _{169}	(Poland) Dawid Kubacki	(Japan) Ryōyū Kobayashi	(Norway) Daniel-André Tande	(Poland) Dawid Kubacki	

=== Men's team ===
World Cup history in real time

Total	LH	NH	Winners
26	12	14	7

after NH event in Râșnov (17 September 2022)

Num	Season	Date	Place	Hill	Event	Winner	Second	Third	Yellow bib	Ref.
26	1	17 September 2022	(Romania) Râșnov	Trambulina Valea Cărbunării HS97	NH _{001}	Austria Daniel Tschofenig; Manuel Fettner	Poland Stefan Hula; Paweł Wąsek	Japan Reruhi Shimizu; Ren Nikaido	Poland	

=== Standings ===
==== Overall ====
Rank	after all 6 events	Points
	(Poland) Dawid Kubacki	380
2	(Austria) Manuel Fettner	210
3	(Poland) Kamil Stoch	182
4	(Poland) Paweł Wąsek	175
5	(Japan) Ren Nikaido	169
6	(Germany) Andreas Wellinger	165
7	(Austria) Daniel Tschofenig	155
8	(Switzerland) Gregor Deschwanden (Germany) Karl Geiger	146
10	(Poland) Jakub Wolny	117

==== Nations Cup ====
Rank	after all 9 events	Points
	Poland	1384
2	Austria	1253
3	Germany	864
4	Japan	819
5	Norway	797
6	Slovenia	724
7	Switzerland	405
8	Italy	189
9	Finland	135
10	Bulgaria	110

==== Prize money ====
Rank	after all 9 payouts	CHF
1	(Poland) Dawid Kubacki	18 000
2	(Austria) Manuel Fettner	10 500
3	(Poland) Kamil Stoch	8 000
4	(Japan) Ren Nikaido	6 500
5	(Austria) Daniel Tschofenig	5 250
6	(Poland) Paweł Wąsek	4 500
7	(Slovenia) Anže Lanišek	3 500
8	(Germany) Karl Geiger (Germany) Andreas Wellinger (Norway) Daniel-André Tande	3 250

== Women ==
World Cup history in real time

Total	LH	NH	Winners
46	14	32	11

after LH event in Klingenthal (2 October 2022)

=== Calendar ===
NH – normal hill / LH – large hill
Num	Season	Date	Place	Hill	Event	Winner	Second	Third	Yellow bib	Ref.
42	1	23 July 2022	(Poland) Wisła	Malinka HS134	LH _{011}	(Slovenia) Urša Bogataj	(Austria) Marita Kramer	(Slovenia) Nika Križnar	(Slovenia) Urša Bogataj	
43	2	24 July 2022	(Poland) Wisła	Malinka HS134	LH _{012}	(Slovenia) Nika Križnar	(Slovenia) Urša Bogataj	(France) Joséphine Pagnier	(Slovenia) Urša Bogataj	
44	3	6 August 2022	(France) Courchevel	Tremplin du Praz HS135	LH _{013}	(Slovenia) Urša Bogataj	(Slovenia) Nika Križnar	(France) Julia Clair	(Slovenia) Urša Bogataj	
45	4	17 September 2022	(Romania) Râșnov	Trambulina Valea Cărbunării HS97	NH _{032}	(Austria) Eva Pinkelnig	(Slovenia) Urša Bogataj	(Slovenia) Nika Prevc	(Slovenia) Urša Bogataj	
46	5	2 October 2022	(Germany) Klingenthal	Vogtland Arena HS140	LH _{014}	(Slovenia) Urša Bogataj	(Slovenia) Ema Klinec	(Germany) Selina Freitag	(Slovenia) Urša Bogataj	

=== Standings ===
==== Overall ====
Rank	after all 5 events	Points
	(Slovenia) Urša Bogataj	460
2	(Slovenia) Nika Križnar	240
3	(France) Joséphine Pagnier	209
4	(France) Julia Clair	168
5	(Germany) Katharina Althaus	150
6	(Germany) Selina Freitag	146
7	(Austria) Marita Kramer (Japan) Ringo Miyajima	125
9	(Slovenia) Nika Prevc	120
10	(Japan) Yūka Kobayashi	117

==== Nations Cup ====
Rank	after all 7 events	Points
	Slovenia	1402
2	Germany	829
3	Austria	762
4	Japan	580
5	Norway	463
6	France	377
7	Switzerland	217
8	Italy	190
9	Czech Republic	162
10	Romania	125

==== Prize money ====
Rank	after all 7 payouts	CHF
1	(Slovenia) Urša Bogataj	11 750
2	(Slovenia) Nika Križnar	5 000
3	(Austria) Eva Pinkelnig	3 750
4	(Germany) Selina Freitag (Slovenia) Nika Prevc	2 250
6	(Norway) Thea Minyan Bjørseth (Slovenia) Ema Klinec (Norway) Silje Opseth	2 000
9	(Austria) Marita Kramer (France) Joséphine Pagnier	1 750

== Mixed team ==
World Cup history in real time

Total	LH	NH	Winners
9	4	5	4

after LH event in Klingenthal (1 October 2022)

Num	Season	Date	Place	Hill	Event	Winner	Second	Third	Yellow bib	Ref.
8	1	(Note: One round only due to strong wind.)18 September 2022	(Romania) Râșnov	Trambulina Valea Cărbunării HS97	NH_{005}	Austria Julia Mühlbacher; Jan Hörl; Eva Pinkelnig; Daniel Tschofenig	Slovenia Nika Prevc; Patrik Vitez; Urša Bogataj; Peter Prevc	Norway Thea Minyan Bjørseth; Bendik Jakobsen Heggli; Silje Opseth; Fredrik Villumstad	Poland (men); Slovenia (women)	
9	2	1 October 2022	(Germany) Klingenthal	Vogtland Arena HS140	LH_{004}	Norway Silje Opseth; Marius Lindvik; Thea Minyan Bjørseth; Daniel-André Tande	Germany Selina Freitag; Andreas Wellinger; Katharina Althaus; Karl Geiger	Slovenia Ema Klinec; Timi Zajc; Urša Bogataj; Anže Lanišek	Poland (men); Slovenia (women)	

== Podium table by nation ==
Table showing the Grand Prix podium places (gold–1st place, silver–2nd place, bronze–3rd place) by the countries represented by the athletes.

Rank	Nation	Gold	Silver	Bronze	Total
1	Slovenia	4	6	3	13
2	Poland	4	4	1	9
3	Austria	4	1	2	7
4	Japan	1	1	1	3
5	Norway	1	0	2	3
6	Germany	0	1	2	3
7	Switzerland	0	1	0	1
8	France	0	0	2	2
9	Bulgaria	0	0	1	1
Totals (9 entries)		14	14	14	42

== Points distribution ==
The table shows the number of points won in the 2022 FIS Ski Jumping Grand Prix for men and women.

Place	1	2	3	4	5	6	7	8	9	10	11	12	13	14	15	16	17	18	19	20	21	22	23	24	25	26	27	28	29	30
Individual	100	80	60	50	45	40	36	32	29	26	24	22	20	18	16	15	14	13	12	11	10	9	8	7	6	5	4	3	2	1
Mixed Team & Super Team	200	175	150	125	100	75	50	25

== See also ==
- 2022–23 FIS Ski Jumping World Cup
- 2022–23 FIS Ski Jumping Continental Cup
- 2022–23 FIS Cup (ski jumping)
