= Clemens Leitner =

Austrian ski jumper (born 1998)

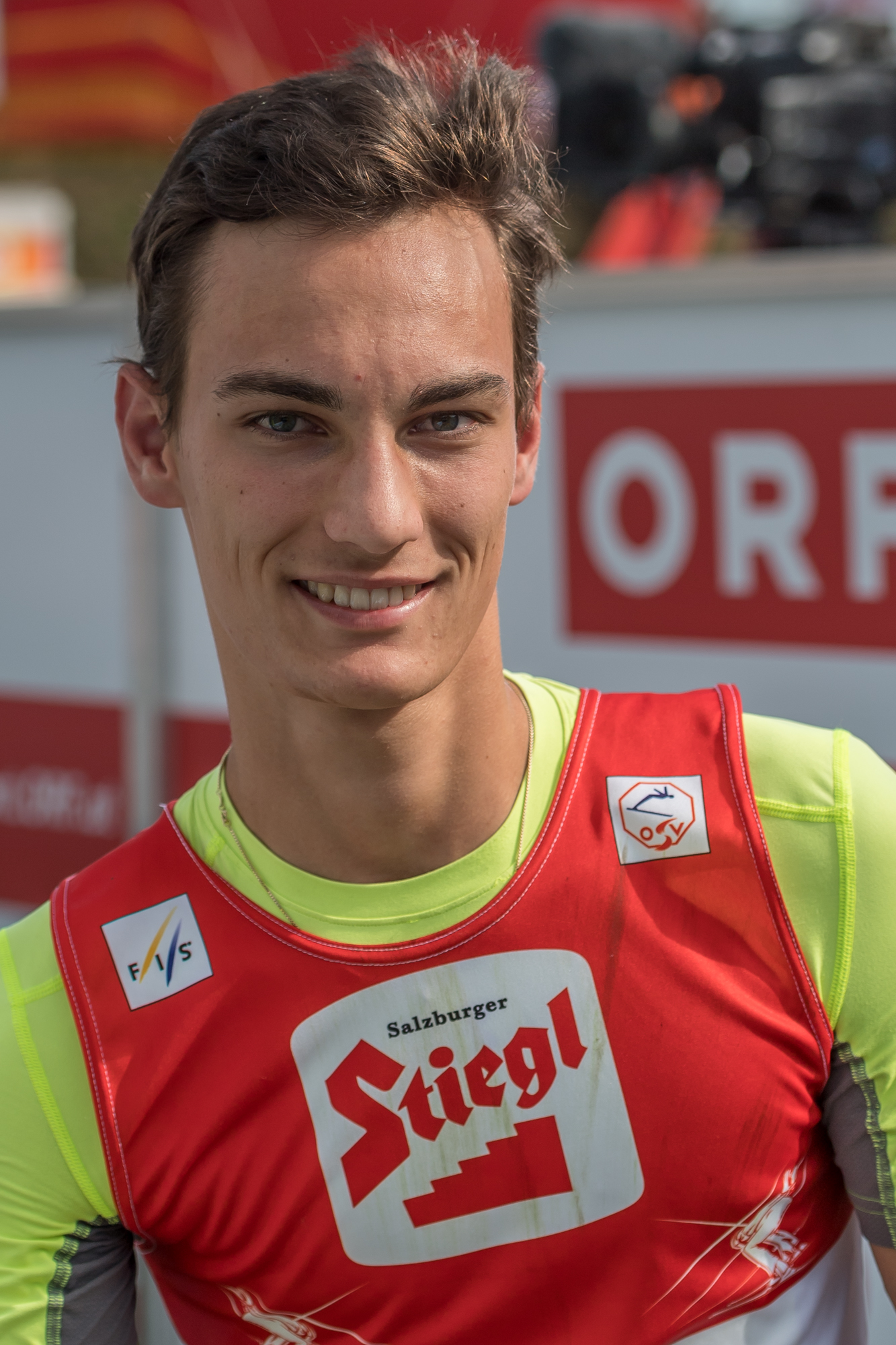
- Leitner in 2016

Personal information
- Nationality: Austria
- Born: 7 November 1998 (age 27) Stams, Austria
- Height: 1.77 m (5 ft 10 in)

Sport
- Sport: Skiing
- Club: Nordic Team Absam

World Cup career
- Seasons: 2016–present

Achievements and titles
- Personal bests: 206.5 m (677 ft); Planica, 30 March 2023
- Updated on 9 December 2023

Clemens Leitner (born 7 November 1998) is an Austrian ski jumper, representative of the Nordic Team Absam club.

== Career ==
Leitner won individual bronze medalist of the Junior World Championships in 2018, winner of two silver medals and a bronze medal in the team (2017–2018). He was a team bronze medalist of the European Youth Winter Olympic Festival and the Youth Olympic Games. Winner of the 2019–2020 Continental Cup.

His older brother, Felix, is a biathlete.
