= Benjamin Østvold =

Norwegian ski jumper (born 2001)

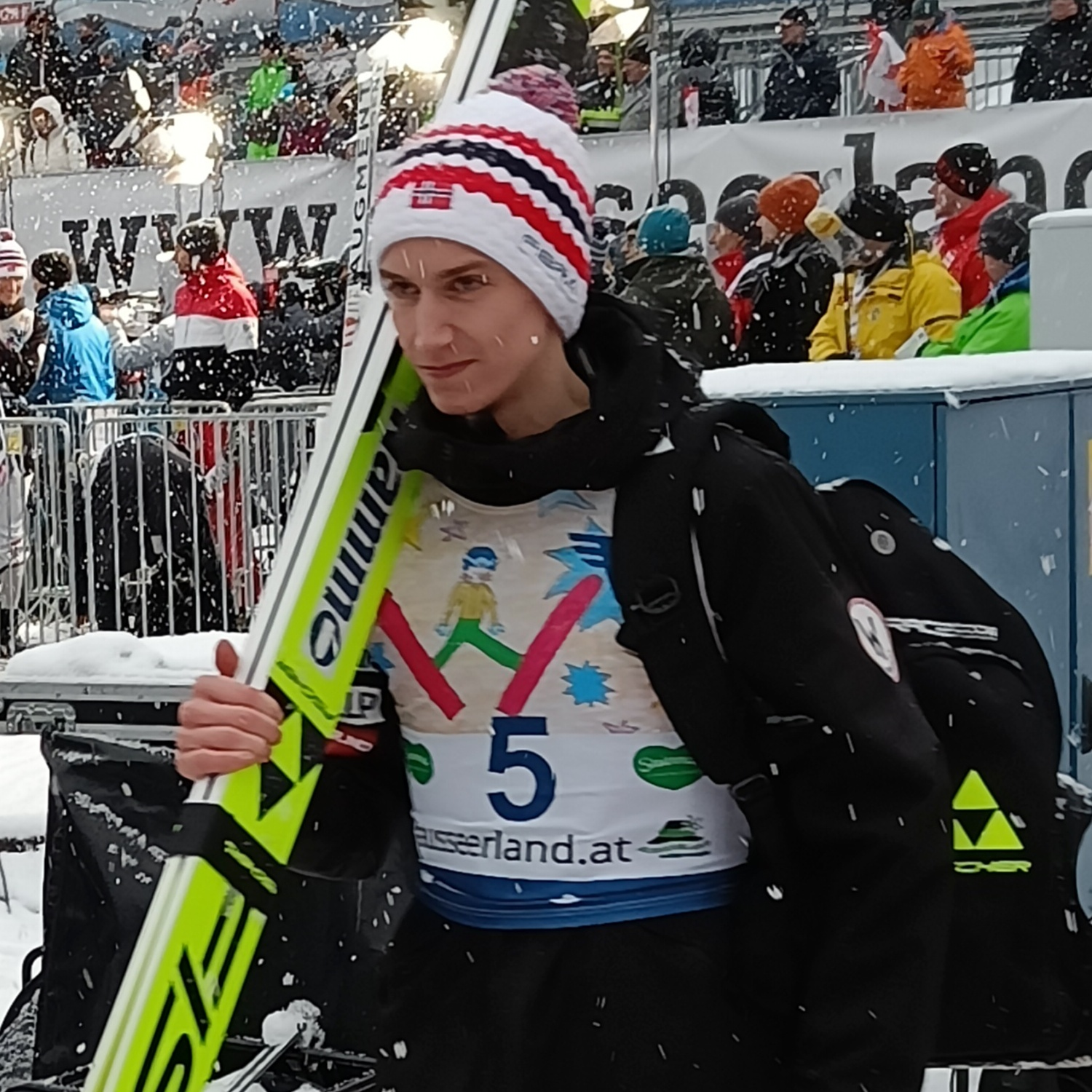
- Østvold in 2023

Personal information
- Born: 13 January 2001 (age 25)

Sport
- Sport: Ski jumping
Medal record
Representing Norway
Men's ski flying
World Championships
Bronze medal – third place	2026 Oberstdorf	Team

Benjamin Østvold (born 13 January 2001) is a Norwegian ski jumper.

== Career ==
During the 2022–23 FIS Ski Jumping Continental Cup, Østvold won the winter overall 1079 points. He had 12 podium finishes, including six victories. During the summer of 2024 he lost several sponsors, and had to begin working night shifts at a hotel to raise funds for his ski jumping career.

He was unable to compete at the 2025 FIS Ski Jumping Grand Prix due to his suit being two centimeters too big on one upper arm. He represented Norway at the FIS Ski Flying World Championships 2026 and won a bronze medal in the team event.
