= Mika Schwann =

Austrian ski jumper

Personal information
- Nationality: Austrian
- Born: 30 July 1999 (age 25)

Sport
- Sport: Ski jumping

Mika Schwann (born 30 July 1999) is an Austrian ski jumper and representative of the club KSG Klagenfurt–Kärten. He won with team silver medal at the 2018 Nordic Junior World Ski Championships and bronze medal at the 2017 Nordic Junior World Ski Championships.
