= Sondre Ringen =

Norwegian ski jumper (born 1996)

Sondre Ringen (born 9 October 1996) is a Norwegian ski jumper.

He made his FIS Ski Jumping Continental Cup debut in March 2017, made his first podium in January 2018 in Titisee-Neustadt, and has second place as his best result, from January 2018 in Sapporo, March 2018 in Rena and December 2019 in Vikersund.

He made his FIS Ski Jumping World Cup debut in December 2018 in Lillehammer, collecting his first World Cup points with a 22nd place. He competed two more times on the 2018–19 World Cup circuit, both in Nizhny Tagil.

He represents the sports club Bækkelagets SK.
