= Anders Håre =

Norwegian ski jumper

Anders Håre (born 7 December 1999) is a Norwegian ski jumper.

He made his FIS Ski Jumping Continental Cup debut in December 2018, made his first top-10 with a 5th place in September 2019 in Stams and won his first race on home ground in December 2019 in Vikersund. Competing at the 2019 World Junior Championships, he placed 20th.

He made his FIS Ski Jumping World Cup debut in December 2019 in Engelberg. Barely missing out on the top 30, he was included in the Norwegian squad for the 2019-20 Four Hills Tournament. Here, he collected his first World Cup points with a 30th place in Bischofshofen.

He represents the sports club Vikersund IF. He hails from Skotselv and is a son of Frode Håre.
