= Martin Hamann =

German ski jumper (born 1997)

Personal information
- Nationality: Germany
- Born: 10 April 1997 (age 29) Altenbach, Germany
- Height: 1.76 m (5 ft 9 in)

Sport
- Sport: Skiing
- Club: SG Nickelhuette Aue

World Cup career
- Seasons: 2019–present
- Indiv. starts: 36
- Indiv. podiums: 0
- Indiv. wins: 0
- Team starts: 1
- Team podiums: 1
- Team wins: 0

Martin Hamann (born 10 April 1997) is a German ski jumper.

He participated at the large hill event at the FIS Nordic World Ski Championships 2021.

== FIS World Nordic Ski Championships results ==
Event	Normal hill	Large hill	Team LH	Mixed Team NH
(Germany) 2021 Oberstdorf		24		
