= Abigail Strate =

Canadian ski jumper (born 2001)

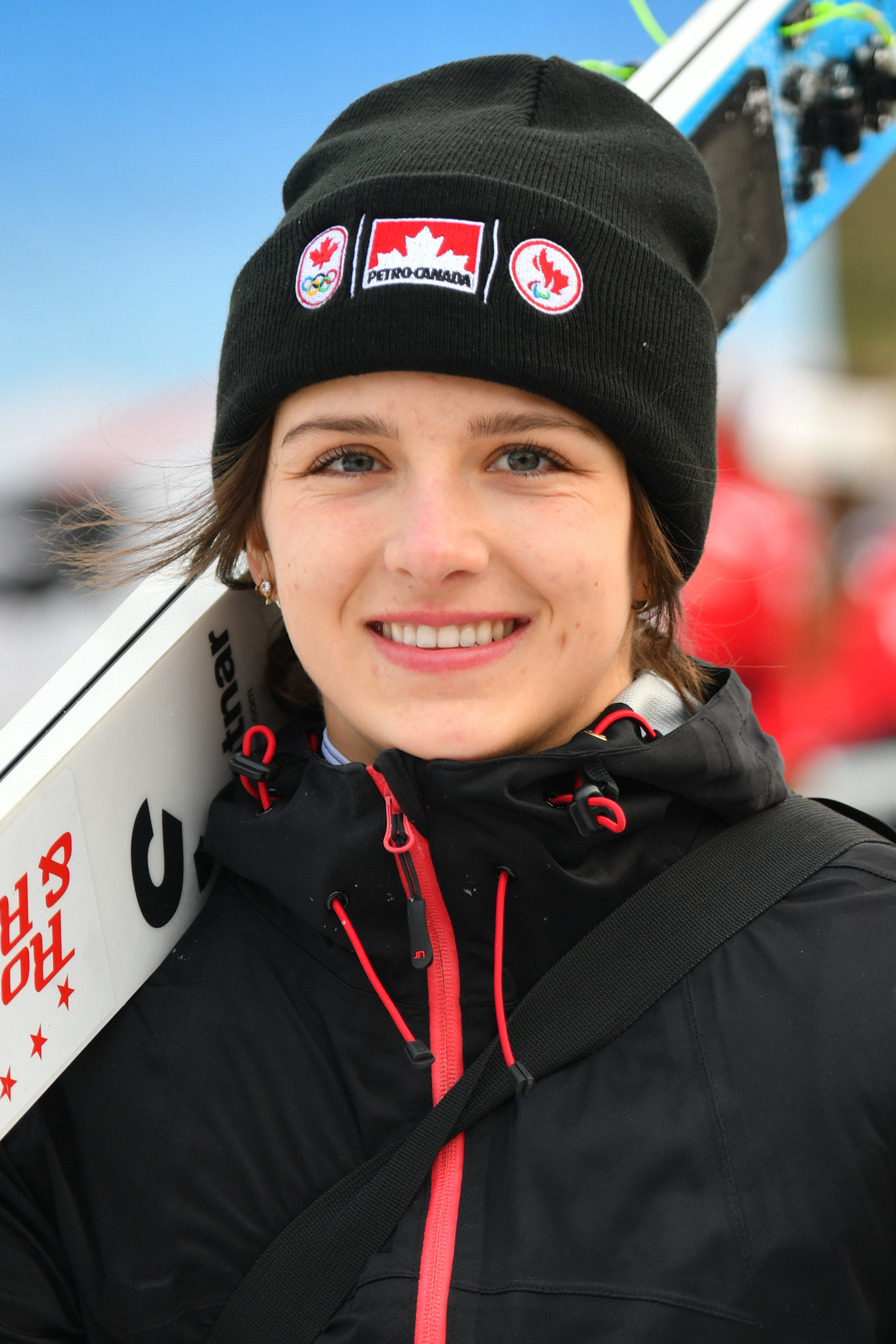
- 2023 in Hinzenbach (Austria)

Personal information
- Born: 22 February 2001 (age 25) Calgary, Alberta, Canada
- Height: 161 cm (5 ft 3 in)

Sport
- Country: Canada
- Sport: Ski jumping
- Club: Altius Nordic Ski Club

World Cup career
- Indiv. starts: 98
- Indiv. podiums: 8
- Indiv. wins: 1

Achievements and titles
- Personal bests: 205.5 m (674 ft); Vikersund, 15 March 2025
Medal record
Winter Olympics
Bronze medal – third place	2022 Beijing	Mixed team
- Updated on 1 January 2026

Abigail Strate (born 22 February 2001) is a Canadian ski jumper, born in Calgary, Alberta. Strate began ski jumping at six years old, and entered her first international competition when she was ten, in Utah. In her participation at the 2022 Beijing Winter Olympics, Strate helped Canada win its first ever Olympic medal in ski jumping, a Bronze in the Mixed team event, and also placed 23rd in the Women's Normal Hill Individual event, with a total of 161.9 points.

== Personal life ==
In her free time, Strate enjoys spending time outside by mountain biking, beekeeping, gardening, and caring for her chickens.

== Career ==
Strate competed in four events at the FIS Nordic World Ski Championships 2021, finishing 27th on the normal hill, 28th on the large hill, 11th on the women's team normal hill and finally 10th in the mixed team normal hill.

Strate lives and trains in Slovenia for 8 months a year with the Canadian women's team, as the jumps at the Canada Olympic Park in Calgary were shut down.

=== 2022 Winter Olympics ===
In January 2022, Strate was named to Canada's 2022 Olympic team. On February 7, Strate won the bronze medal as part of Canada's entry into the mixed team competition, alongside Mackenzie Boyd-Clowes, Alexandria Loutitt, and Matthew Soukup. This was Canada's first ever Olympic medal in the sport of ski jumping.

== World Cup ==
=== Standings ===
Season	Position	Points
2016–17	56	5
2017–18	52	2
2018–19	—	0
2019–20	—	0
2020–21	47	1
2021–22	23	170
2022–23	11	669
2023–24	17	424
2024–25	15	408
2025–26	4	569

=== Individual wins ===
No.	Season	Date	Location	Hill	Size
1	2025–26	1 January 2026	(Germany) Oberstdorf	ORLEN Arena Oberstdorf HS137	LH
