= Villacher Alpenarena =

Ski jumping hill in Austria

Coordinates: 46.6031°N 13.8114°E

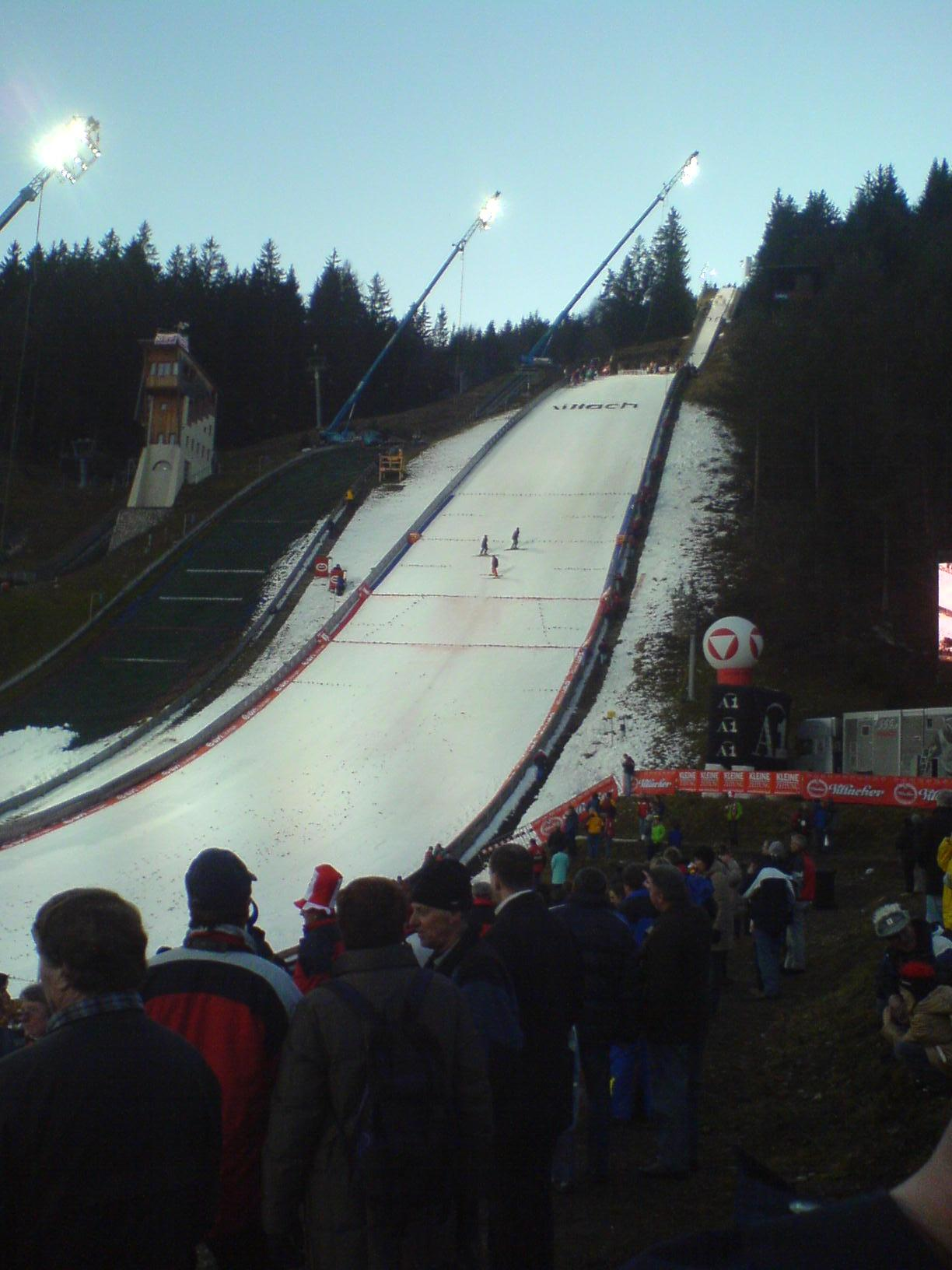
- Location: Villach; Austria
- Opened: 1937
- Renovated: 1995, 2012

Size
- K–point: K-90
- Hill size: HS 98
- Hill record: 104.0 m (341 ft) (Austria) Michael Hayböck (25 October 2015)

Villacher Alpenarena is a ski jumping hill in Villach, Austria.

== History ==
It was opened in 1937 and owned by SV Villach. It hosted six FIS Ski jumping World Cup individual events and one team event. Michael Hayböck holds the hill record. There are also K-15, K-30 and K-60 hills.
