= Joacim Bjøreng =

Norwegian ski jumper (born 1995)

Joacim Ødegård Bjøreng (born 14 December 1995) is a Norwegian ski jumper.

At the 2015 Nordic Junior World Ski Championships he finished seventh in the normal hill and won a gold medal in the team competition. He made his Continental Cup debut with a fourth place in December 2014 in Engelberg, and has won two events on the summer circuit; in August 2015 in Wisla and September 2016 in Lillehammer.

He made his FIS Ski Jumping World Cup debut in February 2015 in Vikersund, recording a 36th place, and collected his first World Cup points a year later in the same event with a 28th place.

He represents the sports club Røykenhopp.
