= FIS Ski Flying World Championships 2026 – Individual =

Individual at the FIS Ski Flying World Championships 2026
- Venue: Heini-Klopfer-Skiflugschanze
- Location: Oberstdorf, Germany
- Dates: 23 January (Round 1–2); 24 January (Round 3–4)
- Competitors: 40 from 13 nations
- Winning points: 905.4

Medalists
gold medal	Domen Prevc	Slovenia
silver medal	Marius Lindvik	Norway
bronze medal	Ren Nikaido	Japan

The Individual competition at the FIS Ski Flying World Championships 2026 was held on 23 and 24 January 2026.

== Qualification ==
The qualification was held on 22 January 2026.

Rank	Bib	Name	Country	Distance (m)	Points	Notes
1	63	Domen Prevc	Slovenia	228.5	225.5	Q
2	56	Stephan Embacher	Austria	227.0	212.8	Q
3	60	Jan Hörl	Austria	215.5	204.6	Q
4	52	Naoki Nakamura	Japan	216.5	202.6	Q
5	33	Benjamin Østvold	Norway	212.0	201.3	Q
6	62	Ryōyū Kobayashi	Japan	218.0	197.2	Q
7	54	Stefan Kraft	Austria	214.0	196.6	Q
8	61	Ren Nikaidō	Japan	215.5	195.8	Q
9	49	Marius Lindvik	Norway	212.0	195.0	Q
10	29	Karl Geiger	Germany	210.5	194.5	Q
11	59	Anže Lanišek	Slovenia	216.5	192.5	Q
12	49	Johann André Forfang	Norway	208.5	191.2	Q
13	51	Kristoffer Eriksen Sundal	Norway	208.5	189.1	Q
14	53	Manuel Fettner	Austria	208.5	185.7	Q
15	57	Philipp Raimund	Germany	201.5	181.5	Q
16	40	Antti Aalto	Finland	191.5	179.9	Q
17	50	Vladimir Zografski	Bulgaria	201.0	178.7	Q
18	34	Sandro Hauswirth	Switzerland	178.5	176.7	Q
19	3	Jarkko Määttä	Finland	196.0	174.4	Q
20	48	Valentin Foubert	France	199.0	174.2	Q
21	43	Gregor Deschwanden	Switzerland	191.0	169.3	Q
22	27	Simon Ammann	Switzerland	191.5	169.2	Q
23	26	Alex Insam	Italy	191.5	168.9	Q
24	39	Piotr Żyła	Poland	186.0	168.7	Q
25	58	Daniel Tschofenig	Austria	198.5	168.0	Q
26	55	Felix Hoffmann	Germany	191.0	167.1	Q
27	46	Timi Zajc	Slovenia	196.5	166.8	Q
28	44	Pius Paschke	Germany	188.5	166.0	Q
29	37	Tomofumi Naito	Japan	186.0	165.3	Q
30	21	Yevhen Marusiak	Ukraine	185.0	163.5	Q
31	36	Niko Kytösaho	Finland	172.5	156.4	Q
32	31	Dawid Kubacki	Poland	174.5	150.9	Q
33	11	Eetu Nousiainen	Finland	177.0	150.1	Q
34	25	Felix Trunz	Switzerland	174.0	148.1	Q
35	16	Žak Mogel	Slovenia	164.0	142.7	Q
36	24	Giovanni Bresadola	Italy	166.5	141.5	Q
37	42	Kamil Stoch	Poland	161.5	139.2	Q
38	18	Vitaliy Kalinichenko	Ukraine	161.0	139.2	Q
39	2	Aleksander Zniszczoł	Poland	166.0	137.3	Q
40	17	MacKenzie Boyd-Clowes	Canada	152.0	130.9	Q
41	4	Erik Belshaw	United States	161.0	130.3	
42	41	Jason Colby	United States	155.0	126.7	
43	13	Kaimar Vagul	Estonia	143.5	116.8	
44	10	Jules Chervet	France	154.5	113.9	
45	6	Louis Obersteiner	France	145.5	112.0	
46	7	Muhammed Ali Bedir	Turkey	139.5	99.5	
47	14	Sabirzhan Muminov	Kazakhstan	122.0	87.6	
48	8	Svyatoslav Nazarenko	Kazakhstan	129.0	84.1	
49	12	Nikita Devyatkin	Kazakhstan	111.5	68.8	
50	9	Decker Dean	United States	116.0	66.6	
51	19	Tate Frantz	United States	104.5	63.2	
52	1	Nurshat Tursunzhanov	Kazakhstan	103.5	57.2	

== Results ==
The first two rounds were held on 23 January, and the last two rounds on 24 January.

Rank	Bib	Name	Country	Round 1			Round 2			Round 3			Final round			Total
Rank	Bib	Name	Country	Distance (m)	Points	Rank	Distance (m)	Points	Rank	Distance (m)	Points	Rank	Distance (m)	Points	Rank	Points
1st place, gold medalist(s)	40	Domen Prevc	Slovenia	204.0	213.2	2	224.5	229.0	1	232.0	239.0	1	222.5	224.2	1	905.4
2nd place, silver medalist(s)	24	Marius Lindvik	Norway	226.5	214.6	1	212.0	205.7	5	221.0	208.8	2	231.5	216.8	2	845.9
3rd place, bronze medalist(s)	38	Ren Nikaidō	Japan	230.5	213.1	3	224.5	215.1	3	221.5	204.5	4	220.0	209.7	6	842.4
4	37	Jan Hörl	Austria	207.0	194.4	=12	230.0	219.1	2	211.5	199.8	8	224.0	205.5	7	818.8
5	33	Stephan Embacher	Austria	209.0	199.6	8	204.5	198.3	9	212.5	201.0	7	227.5	212.6	4	811.5
6	39	Ryōyū Kobayashi	Japan	224.0	206.8	4	213.5	190.9	15	211.0	195.9	11	219.5	211.4	5	805.0
7	31	Stefan Kraft	Austria	209.0	194.4	=12	215.5	200.9	7	212.0	204.6	3	220.0	203.3	8	803.2
8	36	Anže Lanišek	Slovenia	199.5	194.4	=12	227.0	213.5	4	199.5	189.2	19	212.5	199.7	10	796.8
9	14	Benjamin Østvold	Norway	213.5	191.6	=15	213.0	196.1	10	203.0	192.5	17	221.5	213.8	3	794.0
10	29	Naoki Nakamura	Japan	216.5	205.0	5	211.5	200.5	8	196.5	186.9	22	211.5	200.4	9	792.8
11	19	Antti Aalto	Finland	215.5	197.0	9	195.0	190.3	=16	201.5	199.5	9	220.0	199.1	11	785.9
12	26	Johann André Forfang	Norway	210.5	195.0	11	219.5	204.3	6	199.5	193.4	15	202.5	189.5	19	782.2
13	34	Philipp Raimund	Germany	201.5	191.6	=15	208.0	195.3	11	201.0	203.3	5	210.5	189.3	20	779.5
14	28	Kristoffer Eriksen Sundal	Norway	216.0	202.6	6	193.0	180.1	21	192.0	188.5	20	214.0	198.0	12	769.2
15	18	Piotr Żyła	Poland	211.0	187.6	18	206.5	194.3	12	188.5	184.8	23	212.0	197.2	13	763.9
16	30	Manuel Fettner	Austria	201.5	181.6	20	202.5	181.6	20	208.0	194.2	13	207.5	195.2	14	752.6
17	12	Karl Geiger	Germany	217.5	199.7	7	197.0	192.2	14	202.0	189.7	18	187.5	170.8	27	752.4
18	16	Niko Kytösaho	Finland	205.0	180.3	21	210.0	190.3	=16	198.5	183.5	25	212.0	194.6	16	748.7
19	17	Tomofumi Naito	Japan	200.5	170.8	29	206.5	158.3	18	203.5	196.8	10	198.0	188.0	21	743.6
20	23	Timi Zajc	Slovenia	213.0	196.6	10	196.5	177.1	22	186.5	183.7	24	205.0	182.2	25	739.6
21	25	Valentin Foubert	France	196.5	176.3	27	187.5	169.5	28	207.0	201.2	6	201.5	190.1	18	737.1
22	32	Felix Hoffmann	Germany	196.0	178.2	25	188.0	167.4	30	202.0	193.1	16	215.0	194.8	15	733.5
23	27	Vladimir Zografski	Bulgaria	199.5	179.7	23	209.5	193.4	13	175.0	167.1	29	206.5	191.5	17	731.7
24	10	Alex Insam	Italy	202.5	188.2	17	195.5	174.8	25	196.5	180.0	26	195.5	186.6	23	729.6
25	22	Pius Paschke	Germany	202.5	178.0	26	194.5	176.0	24	202.0	194.6	12	202.0	180.9	26	729.5
26	15	Sandro Hauswirth	Switzerland	202.0	180.2	22	199.5	172.9	26	197.5	187.9	21	200.0	187.6	22	728.6
27	35	Daniel Tschofenig	Austria	188.0	178.4	24	193.0	176.2	23	186.0	172.1	28	200.0	183.4	24	710.1
28	2	Jarkko Määttä	Finland	202.0	173.2	28	190.5	169.4	29	183.0	172.3	27	195.5	114.6	29	692.2
29	7	Yevhen Marusiak	Ukraine	203.5	187.3	19	205.0	183.4	19	203.5	194.1	14	151.5	111.7	30	676.5
30	21	Gregor Deschwanden	Switzerland	194.0	168.4	30	192.0	172.6	27	181.5	166.7	30	187.5	163.9	28	671.6
—	11	Simon Ammann	Switzerland	187.0	167.0	31	Did not advance									167.0
—	8	Giovanni Bresadola	Italy	189.5	166.5	32	Did not advance									166.5
—	1	Aleksander Zniszczoł	Poland	195.0	163.7	33	Did not advance									163.7
—	20	Kamil Stoch	Poland	191.5	162.2	34	Did not advance									162.2
—	13	Dawid Kubacki	Poland	192.5	161.1	35	Did not advance									161.1
—	4	Žak Mogel	Slovenia	190.0	160.8	36	Did not advance									160.8
—	9	Felix Trunz	Switzerland	186.0	160.1	37	Did not advance									160.1
—	3	Eetu Nousiainen	Finland	191.0	159.0	38	Did not advance									159.0
—	5	MacKenzie Boyd-Clowes	Canada	167.5	141.3	39	Did not advance									141.3
—	6	Vitaliy Kalinichenko	Ukraine	139.0	104.9	40	Did not advance									104.9
