= FIS Ski Flying World Championships 2024 – Individual =

Individual at the FIS Ski Flying World Championships 2024
- Venue: Kulm HS235
- Location: Bad Mitterndorf/Tauplitz, Austria
- Dates: 26 January (Round 1–2); 27 January (Round 3)
- Competitors: 47 from 15 nations
- Winning points: 647.4

Medalists
gold medal	Stefan Kraft	Austria
silver medal	Andreas Wellinger	Germany
bronze medal	Timi Zajc	Slovenia

The 28th edition of the individual competition at the FIS Ski Flying World Championships 2024 was held between 26 and 27 January 2024 in Bad Mitterndorf/Tauplitz, Austria.

Stefan Kraft from Austria won the title of ski flying world champion ahead of Andreas Wellinger and Timi Zajc in three rounds only.

== Qualification ==
The qualifiers, scheduled for 25 January, were cancelled due to strong winds. Nevertheless, they managed to complete two official training sessions the next day, after which 47 jumpers selected by the national teams took part in the first round of the competition. The top 30 contestants advanced to the second round.

== Results ==
The first two rounds were held on 26 January. The third round was held on 27 January, while the fourth round was cancelled due to pre-competition delays due to wind.

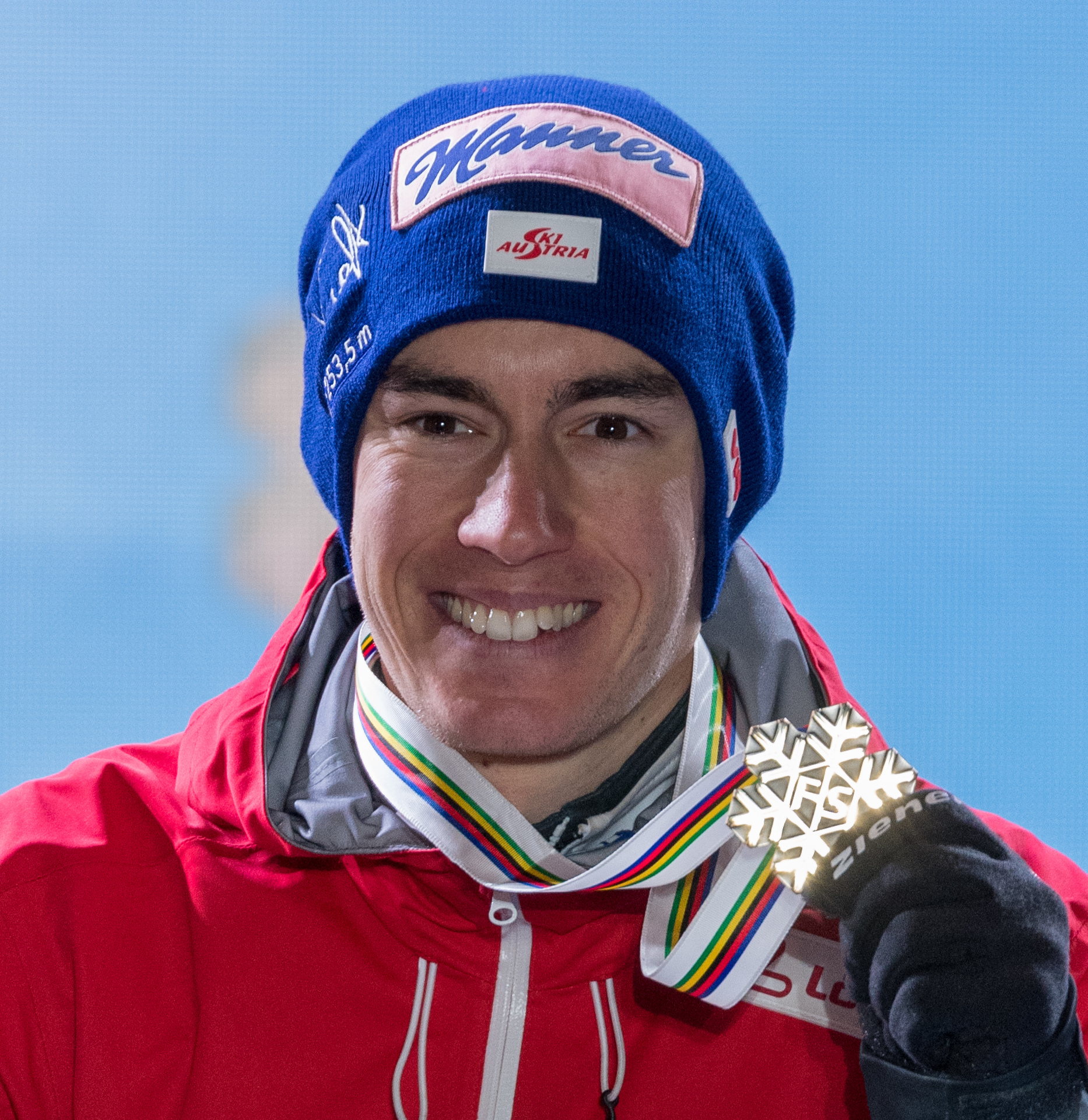
Stefan Kraft, the 2024 world champion

Rank	Bib	Name	Country	Distance (meters)			Points
Rank	Bib	Name	Country	1st round	2nd round	3rd round	Points
1st place, gold medalist(s)	47	Stefan Kraft	Austria	225.5	219.0	228.0	647.4
2nd place, silver medalist(s)	46	Andreas Wellinger	Germany	222.0	218.5	229.0	645.2
3rd place, bronze medalist(s)	32	Timi Zajc	Slovenia	228.5	227.0	209.5	642.7
4	33	Johann André Forfang	Norway	219.5	220.0	217.0	629.3
5	37	Lovro Kos	Slovenia	222.0	210.0	221.0	628.6
6	30	Piotr Żyła	Poland	218.0	220.5	225.0	626.4
7	16	Niko Kytösaho	Finland	232.5	218.5	215.0	613.9
8	41	Michael Hayböck	Austria	217.0	210.5	215.5	610.1
9	45	Ryōyū Kobayashi	Japan	214.0	196.5	231.5	603.5
10	35	Stephan Leyhe	Germany	207.5	216.5	218.5	588.8
11	2	Robin Pedersen	Norway	219.5	205.5	217.5	588.7
12	26	Aleksander Zniszczoł	Poland	223.0	215.5	198.0	588.2
13	40	Marius Lindvik	Norway	201.5	206.0	210.5	585.2
14	28	Domen Prevc	Slovenia	208.0	213.5	203.5	580.8
15	24	Giovanni Bresadola	Italy	213.5	204.5	197.5	569.6
16	44	Jan Hörl	Austria	201.5	214.5	183.5	566.0
17	36	Gregor Deschwanden	Switzerland	192.5	200.5	235.5 PB	560.4
18	21	Alex Insam	Italy	209.0	193.0	224.0	557.1
19	42	Karl Geiger	Germany	213.0	180.0	211.5	555.6
20	15	Tate Frantz	United States	218.5 PB	184.0	209.5	549.6
21	22	Junshirō Kobayashi	Japan	217.0	187.0	200.0	544.4
22	27	Daniel-André Tande	Norway	203.0	190.0	205.5	541.8
23	43	Pius Paschke	Germany	198.5	195.0	182.0	539.7
24	29	Dawid Kubacki	Poland	205.5	203.0	183.5	529.7
25	18	Artti Aigro	Estonia	216.5	193.5	179.5	527.8
26	38	Peter Prevc	Slovenia	200.5	209.5	132.0	481.0
27	1	Yevhen Marusiak	Ukraine	195.0	176.5	185.0	474.5
28	19	Simon Ammann	Switzerland	197.0	175.0	144.0	430.9
29	20	Paweł Wąsek	Poland	204.0	174.5	161.0	404.6
30	31	Ren Nikaidō	Japan	194.0	NPS	178.5	342.1
31	17	Remo Inhof	Switzerland	195.5	Did not advance		165.2
32	8	Sandro Hauswirth	Switzerland	190.0	Did not advance		155.5
33	14	Kasperi Valto	Finland	185.5	Did not advance		147.1
34	5	Naoki Nakamura	Japan	179.0	Did not advance		145.5
35	39	Manuel Fettner	Austria	158.0	Did not advance		129.5
36	12	Erik Belshaw	United States	191.5	Did not advance		127.0
37	7	Kevin Bickner	United States	165.0	Did not advance		124.7
38	13	Eetu Nousiainen	Finland	168.0	Did not advance		124.0
39	6	Fatih Arda İpcioğlu	Turkey	162.0	Did not advance		120.1
40	23	Vladimir Zografski	Bulgaria	159.0	Did not advance		117.4
41	25	Antti Aalto	Finland	150.0	Did not advance		112.4
42	11	Andrew Urlaub	United States	154.5	Did not advance		102.1
43	9	Nikita Devyatkin	Kazakhstan	137.5 PB	Did not advance		91.2
44	3	Vitaliy Kalinichenko	Ukraine	127.5	Did not advance		78.7
DSQ	34	Halvor Egner Granerud	Norway	NPS	Did not advance		0.0
DSQ	10	Andrea Campregher	Italy	NPS	Did not advance		0.0
DSQ	4	Sabirzhan Muminov	Kazakhstan	NPS	Did not advance		0.0

Key

- DSQ = Disqualified
- NPS = Not permitted to start
