= FIS Ski Flying World Championships 2026 – Team =

Team at the FIS Ski Flying World Championships 2026
- Venue: Heini-Klopfer-Skiflugschanze
- Location: Oberstdorf, Germany
- Dates: 25 January
- Competitors: 40 from 10 nations
- Teams: 10
- Winning points: 1,569.9

Medalists
gold medal	Ryōyū Kobayashi; Tomofumi Naito; Naoki Nakamura; Ren Nikaido	Japan
silver medal	Stephan Embacher; Stefan Kraft; Manuel Fettner; Jan Hörl	Austria
bronze medal	Johann André Forfang; Kristoffer Eriksen Sundal; Benjamin Oestvold; Marius Lindvik	Norway

The Team competition at the FIS Ski Flying World Championships 2026 was held on 25 January 2026.

== Controversies ==
During the jumps of Group 4 in Round 1, an incident involving the skis of Domen Prevc occurred. While preparing for a pre-jump equipment control, Prevc leaned his skis on the control booth. The skis later fell down the in-run, hitting on their way the legs of Marius Lindvik, who was sitting on the starting bar at the moment. An extra set of skis was soon provided by the founder of Slatnar ski manufacturer Peter Slatnar, but Prevc was denied his attempt by an FIS official Hubert Mathis, on account of being too late to the start, as the delay was deemed to be the athlete's fault.

The rules require a competition staff to hold the skis during the control, but according to the Slovenian TV expert Jelko Gros, no such person was present at that moment. Furthermore, it is unclear whether the skis fell on their own, or whether the fall could have been caused by the competition staff member. However, the claim of staff missing was denied by the FIS Ski Jumping World Cup race director Sandro Pertile, who said that the case will be further investigated.

After the end of Round 1, the Slovenian team manager Gorazd Pogorelčnik filed an official protest to the jury, which was quickly rejected by a jury voting with a result of 1:3. The jury requested video footage of the incident, but weren't provided one. Team Slovenia then decided to withdraw from Round 2, but after consideration that decision was reverted. This could have been a misunderstanding on whether Prevc was considered disqualified or did not start.

Next day, the Slovenian Ski Federation announced that they will file an official appeal concerning the incident to the FIS on the following day (27 January 2026). The appeal has been later dismissed by the FIS. The dispute was then submitted to the Court of Arbitration for Sport by the Slovenian Ski Federation, and later withdrawn, after reaching a compromise with the FIS, which granted that a working group on the clarity of the competition rules will be established.

== Results ==
The first round started at 16:15 and the final round at 17:35.

Rank	Bib	Country	Round 1			Final round			Total
Rank	Bib	Country	Distance (m)	Points	Rank	Distance (m)	Points	Rank	Points
1st place, gold medalist(s)	8	Japan; Ryōyū Kobayashi; Tomofumi Naito; Naoki Nakamura; Ren Nikaidō	223.0; 216.0; 222.5; 212.5	775.4; 200.5; 187.4; 196.1; 191.4	1	209.0; 222.0; 224.0; 229.0	794.2; 190.7; 187.9; 209.8; 205.8	1	1,569.6
2nd place, silver medalist(s)	10	Austria; Stephan Embacher; Stefan Kraft; Manuel Fettner; Jan Hörl	233.5; 220.0; 209.5; 204.0	771.5; 209.4; 197.8; 181.8; 182.5	2	217.5; 223.0; 214.0; 216.0	788.5; 203.6; 197.5; 191.6; 195.8	2	1,560.0
3rd place, bronze medalist(s)	6	Norway; Johann André Forfang; Kristoffer Eriksen Sundal; Benjamin Oestvold; Marius Lindvik	215.5; 189.0; 224.0; 216.0	747.9; 192.5; 160.3; 193.4; 201.7	3	202.5; 197.5; 202.0; 230.0	735.8; 186.6; 157.4; 178.8; 213.0	3	1,483.7
4	3	Germany; Pius Paschke; Felix Hoffmann; Karl Geiger; Philipp Raimund	206.0; 197.5; 217.5; 195.0	705.4; 179.8; 167.3; 187.7; 170.6	4	190.0; 206.5; 200.0; 214.5	701.4; 168.3; 168.6; 177.6; 186.9	5	1,406.8
5	3	Finland; Niko Kytösaho; Jarkko Maatta; Eetu Nousiainen; Antti Aalto	219.0; 184.0; 172.0; 206.5	666.3; 194.6; 155.4; 133.2; 183.1	5	153.0; 207.0; 174.0; 216.5	625.0; 115.2; 172.9; 144.0; 192.9	6	1,291.3
6	9	Slovenia; Timi Zajc; Rok Oblak; Anže Lanišek; Domen Prevc	216.0; 195.5; 217.5; DNS	544.0; 192.3; 162.2; 189.5; 0.0	8	197.0; 180.0; 215.5; 228.5	710.6; 168.2; 139.0; 193.8; 209.6	4	1,254.6
6	4	Switzerland; Simon Amman; Sandro Hauswirth; Felix Trunz; Gregor Deschwanden	192.5; 185.0; 204.5; 179.5	639.1; 160.1; 158.6; 174.2; 146.2	6	160.5; 211.5; 188.5; 186.0	615.5; 120.9; 180.8; 162.2; 151.6	7	1,254.6
8	5	Poland; Aleksander Zniszczoł; Dawid Kubacki; Kamil Stoch; Piotr Żyła	175.0; 170.0; 181.0; 204.0	585.7; 135.1; 138.0; 140.6; 172.0	7	138.0; 164.5; 180.0; 204.0	520.5; 92.2; 113.7; 141.6; 173.0	8	1,106.2
9	2	United States; Erik Belshaw; Jason Colby; Decker Dean; Tate Frantz	167.0; 158.0; 121.0; 189.0	464.4; 126.0; 111.5; 69.1; 157.8	9	Did not advance			464.4
10	1	Kazakhstan; Nikita Devyatkin; Sabirzhan Muminov; Nurshat Tursunzhanov; Svyatoslav Nazarenko	117.0; 144.5; 109.5; 115.0	274.8; 64.8; 96.0; 47.2; 66.8	10	Did not advance			274.8
