= Tate Frantz =

American ski jumper (born 2005)

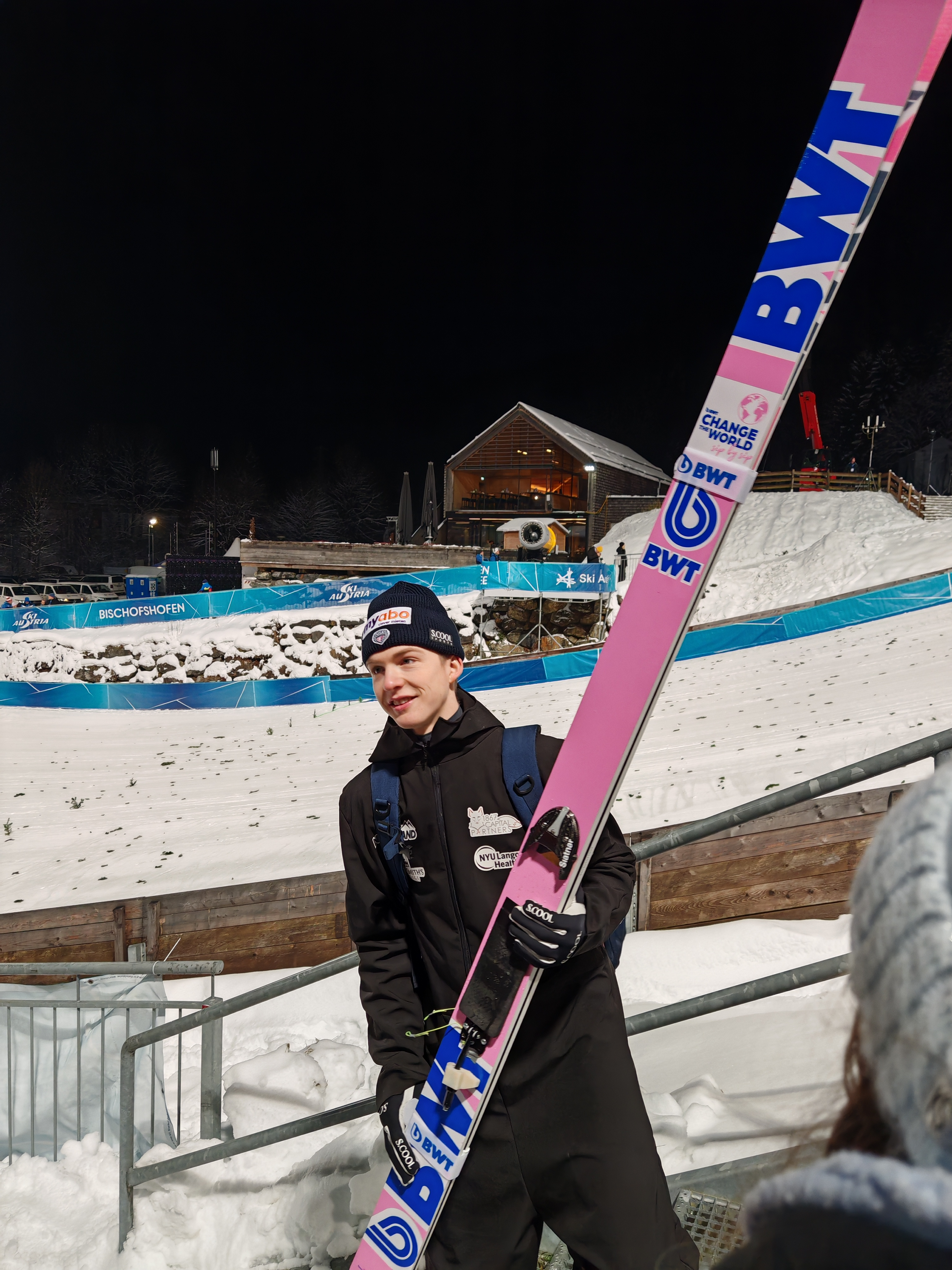
- Frantz in 2025

Personal information
- Nationality: United States
- Born: March 28, 2005 (age 21) Lake Placid, New York, U.S.

Sport
- Sport: Ski jumping
- Club: New York Ski Ed Foundation

World Cup career
- Seasons: 2023–present
- Indiv. starts: 66
- Team starts: 15

Achievements and titles
- Personal bests: 231.5 m (760 ft); Planica, 30 March 2025
Medal record
Men's ski jumping
Representing United States
Junior World Championship
Silver medal – second place	2025 Lake Placid	Individual NH
Silver medal – second place	2025 Lake Placid	Mixed team NH
Bronze medal – third place	2025 Lake Placid	Team NH
- Updated on 21 November 2026

Tate Frantz (born March 28, 2005) is an American ski jumper.

== Career ==
On February 11, 2023, he made his World Cup home debut at Lake Placid, but got stuck in the qualification round.

He reached his first World Cup points in Ruka at the 2023/24 season opening with 30th place individual. He improved that result later in the season at Vikersund (Vikersundbakken) with 16th place, a career best.

Together with Erik Belshaw, he took 7th place at the Super Team World Cup event in Wisła.

In the Men's normal hill individual event at the 2026 Winter Olympics, Frantz finished 21st.

== Major tournament results ==
=== Winter Olympics ===
Year	Place	Individual		Team	
Year	Place	Normal	Large	Super	Mixed
2026	(Italy) Milano Cortina	21	19	8	7

=== FIS Nordic World Ski Championships ===
Year	Place	Individual		Team	
Year	Place	Normal	Large	Men	Mixed
2025	(Norway) Trondheim	16	14	8	6

=== FIS Ski Flying World Championships ===
Year	Place	Individual	Team
2024	(Austria) Tauplitz	20	9
2026	(Germany) Oberstdorf	q	9

=== FIS Nordic Junior World Ski Championships ===
Year	Place	Individual	Team NH	
Year	Place	NH	Men	Mixed
2021	(Canada) Whistler	36	10	10
2023	(Slovenia) Planica	DSQ	6	5
2025	(United States) Lake Placid	2nd place, silver medalist(s)	3rd place, bronze medalist(s)	2nd place, silver medalist(s)

== World Cup ==
=== Standings ===
Season	Overall	4H	SF	RA	P7
2022–23	—	—	—	—	—
2023–24	42	42	34	35	43
2024–25	22	14	20	19	31
2025–26	41	66	33	N/A	37
2026–27				N/A	

=== Individual starts ===
winner (1); second (2); third (3); did not compete (–); failed to qualify (q); disqualified (DQ)
Season	1	2	3	4	5	6	7	8	9	10	11	12	13	14	15	16	17	18	19	20	21	22	23	24	25	26	27	28	29	30	31	32	Points
2022–23	Wisła	Wisła	Kuusamo	Kuusamo	Titisee-Neustadt	Titisee-Neustadt	Engelberg	Engelberg	Oberstdorf	Garmisch-Partenkirchen	Innsbruck	Bischofshofen	Zakopane	Sapporo	Sapporo	Sapporo	Tauplitz	Tauplitz	Willingen	Willingen	Lake Placid	Lake Placid	Râșnov	Oslo	Oslo	Lillehammer	Lillehammer	Vikersund	Vikersund	Lahti	Planica	Planica	0
2022–23	–	–	–	–	–	–	–	–	–	–	–	–	–	–	–	–	–	–	–	–	q	q	–	–	–	–	–	–	–	–	–	–	0
2023–24	Kuusamo	Kuusamo	Lillehammer	Lillehammer	Klingenthal	Klingenthal	Engelberg	Engelberg	Oberstdorf	Garmisch-Partenkirchen	Innsbruck	Bischofshofen	Wisła	Zakopane	Willingen	Willingen	Lake Placid	Lake Placid	Sapporo	Sapporo	Oberstdorf	Oberstdorf	Lahti	Lahti	Oslo	Oslo	Trondheim	Trondheim	Vikersund	Vikersund	Planica	Planica	71
2023–24	q	30	q	q	43	41	39	50	49	50	44	45	18	37	–	–	–	–	q	23	34	q	17	18	24	31	44	34	16	–	DQ	–	71
2024–25	Lillehammer	Lillehammer	Kuusamo	Kuusamo	Wisła	Wisła	Titisee-Neustadt	Titisee-Neustadt	Engelberg	Engelberg	Oberstdorf	Garmisch-Partenkirchen	Innsbruck	Bischofshofen	Zakopane	Oberstdorf	Oberstdorf	Willingen	Willingen	Lake Placid	Lake Placid	Sapporo	Sapporo	Oslo	Vikersund	Vikersund	Lahti	Planica	Planica				266
2024–25	10	10	21	32	q	33	27	26	42	34	19	15	23	13	25	13	14	16	10	19	16	–	–	25	24	27	q	q	21				266
2025–26	Lillehammer	Lillehammer	Falun	Falun	Ruka	Wisła	Wisła	Klingenthal	Klingenthal	Engelberg	Engelberg	Oberstdorf	Garmisch-Partenkirchen	Innsbruck	Bischofshofen	Zakopane	Sapporo	Sapporo	Willingen	Willingen	Bad Mitterndorf	Bad Mitterndorf	Lahti	Lahti	Oslo	Oslo	Vikersund	Planica	Planica				66
2025–26	34	37	28	q	38	37	34	30	30	37	q	q	44	q	q	–	34	43	42	27	q	q	30	20	27	10	17	30	–				66
2026–27	Lillehammer	Lillehammer	Ruka	Ruka	Wisła	Wisła	Titisee-Neustadt	Titisee-Neustadt	Engelberg	Engelberg	Oberstdorf	Garmisch-Partenkirchen	Innsbruck	Bischofshofen	Zakopane	Sapporo	Sapporo	Willingen	Willingen	Lake Placid	Lahti	Vikersund	Vikersund	Oslo	Oslo	Planica	Planica						0
2026–27	35																																0
