= 2025–26 FIS Ski Jumping World Cup =

Ski jumping championship season

Discipline	Men	Women
Overall	(Slovenia) Domen Prevc (1st title)	(Slovenia) Nika Prevc (3rd title)
Nations Cup	Austria (23rd)	Japan
Ski Flying	(Slovenia) Domen Prevc	(Norway) Eirin Maria Kvandal

Stage events
Four Hills Tournament	(Slovenia) Domen Prevc (1st)	—
Two Nights Tournament	—	(Slovenia) Nika Prevc (3rd)
Planica7	(Slovenia) Domen Prevc	—

Competition
Edition	47th	15th
Locations	18	18
Individual	29	33
Team	3	–
Mixed	2	2
Cancelled	2	–
Rescheduled	1	–

The 2025–26 FIS Ski Jumping World Cup, organized by the International Ski Federation (FIS), is the 47th World Cup season for men, the 29th season in ski flying, and the 15th season for women as the highest level of international ski jumping competitions.

The men's and women's season started on 21 November 2025 in Lillehammer, Norway. The men's season concluded on 29 March 2026 in Planica, Slovenia, with the women's season ending on 28 March 2026, also in Planica.

A major highlight of the season was the 2026 Winter Olympics, held in Milan–Cortina, Italy, from 7 to 16 February, with the ski jumping events taking place in Val di Fiemme. The results from these competitions were not included in the World Cup standings.

Daniel Tschofenig from Austria (men's) and Nika Prevc from Slovenia (women's), were the reigning champions from the previous season. Nika successfully defended the title she had also won in the two previous seasons, becoming only the third ski jumper in history to win the overall World Cup three times in a row (after Adam Małysz and Maren Lundby). In the men's competition, the title was won for the first time by her brother, Domen Prevc – marking the first time in history that siblings have won the overall World Cup in the same season.

1st historic women's ski flying small crystal globe was awarded this season.

== Season overview ==
For the first time since 2014, Ski Jumping World Cup events were held in Sweden. The competitions in Falun, which took place on 25–26 November 2025, served as a rehearsal for the FIS Nordic World Ski Championships 2027.

On 31 December 2025, Zeng Ping improved Chinese World Cup result set in Garmisch-Partenkirchen to 6th place (by beating previous best result at 7th place). And just the next day she became the first ever ski jumper from China – male or female – to stand on the podium at a World Cup event (the 12th competition of the season in Oberstdorf on New Year's Day). She achieved this result on her 21st birthday.

As a result of Nika Prevc’s victory in the competition in Villach on 5 January, the Slovenian athlete took the lead in the World Cup standings. This marked the first time in history that siblings – Domen Prevc (leader in the men’s competition) and Nika (leader in the women’s competition) – were simultaneously World Cup leaders in ski jumping.

On 6 March 2026, Nika Prevc set an all-time record for both men’s and women’s competitions by securing her 16th World Cup victory of the season.

On the same day, her brother Domen Prevc became only the second ski jumper in history to complete the ski jumping's “Grand Slam”, consisting of victories in:

- FIS Ski Jumping World Championships
- Four Hills Tournament
- FIS Ski Jumping World Cup
- Olympic gold at Winter Olympic Games
- FIS Ski Flying World Championships.

The first to achieve this feat was Matti Nykänen, who won all the major titles in just over three years (1,113 days). The Slovenian accomplished the same achievement in less than a year, completing it in only 363 days.

On 6 March 2026, Domen Prevc also became the first and only ski jumper in history who won all 7 available titles as he is;

- Olympic champion
- Nordic world champion
- Ski flying world champion
- Overall World Cup title (big crystal globe)
- Ski flying World Cup title (small crystal globe)
- Four Hills Tournament winner
- World record holder

Also on 6 March 2026, in the men's competition, Vladimir Zografski finished third in the competition in Lahti. It marked the first time since 1987 that an athlete representing a new nation reached a World Cup podium, with Bulgaria becoming the newest country to appear on the podium.

As a result of finishing 3rd in the Super Team competition on 8 March in Lahti, the Finnish national team reached the World Cup podium for the first time in more than 12 years (exactly 4,446 days). The last time it happened was on 4 January 2014, when Anssi Koivuranta won the individual competition in Innsbruck.

== Map of World Cup hosts ==
The following list contains all 23 World Cup hosts of the season.

Lillehammer	Falun	Ruka	Wisła	Klingenthal	Engelberg
Lysgårdsbakken	Lugnet	Rukatunturi	Malinka	Vogtland Arena	Gross-Titlis
Oberstdorf	Garmisch-Pa	Innsbruck	Bischofshofen	Zakopane	Sapporo
Schattenbergschanze	Große Olympiaschanze	Bergiselschanze	Paul-Ausserleitner	Wielka Krokiew	Ōkurayama
Willingen	Bad Mitterndorf	Lahti	Oslo	Vikersund	Planica
Mühlenkopfschanze	Kulm	Salpausselkä	Holmenkollbakken	Vikersundbakken	Letalnica bratov Gorišek
Villach	Ljubno ob Savinji	Zhangjiakou	Zaō	Hinzenbach	Predazzo
					2026 Winter Olympics (7–16 February 2026)
Villacher Alpenarena	Savina Center	Snow Ruyi	Yamagata	Aigner-Schanze	Men & Women
Europe
Germany		Austria 2026 Winter Olympics		Asia	

== Men's Individual ==
Individual events in the World Cup history

Total	F	L	N	Winners
1177	157	857	163	177

after flying hill event in Planica (29 March 2026)

=== Calendar ===
Event key: N – normal hill / L – large hill / F – flying hill
All	No.	Date	Place (Hill)	Size	Winner	Second	Third	Overall Leader	R.
1149	1	22 November 2025	(Norway) Lillehammer (Lysgårdsbakken HS140)	L _{835}	(Austria) Daniel Tschofenig	(Austria) Jan Hörl	(Austria) Stefan Kraft	(Austria) Daniel Tschofenig	
1150	2	23 November 2025	(Norway) Lillehammer (Lysgårdsbakken HS140)	L _{836}	(Japan) Ryōyū Kobayashi	(Slovenia) Domen Prevc	(Germany) Felix Hoffmann	(Japan) Ryōyū Kobayashi	
1151	3	25 November 2025	(Sweden) Falun (Lugnet HS95/HS132)	N _{163}	(Austria) Stefan Kraft	(Slovenia) Anže Lanišek	(Germany) Philipp Raimund	(Austria) Stefan Kraft	
1152	4	26 November 2025	(Sweden) Falun (Lugnet HS95/HS132)	L _{837}	(Slovenia) Anže Lanišek	(Austria) Stephan Embacher	(Slovenia) Domen Prevc	(Slovenia) Anže Lanišek	
1153	5	29 November 2025	(Finland) Ruka (Note: Men's individual large hill event in Ruka (29 November) had only one round due to strong wind.) (Rukatunturi HS142)	L _{838}	(Slovenia) Anže Lanišek	(Japan) Ren Nikaidō	(Slovenia) Domen Prevc	(Slovenia) Anže Lanišek	
—		30 November 2025	(Finland) Ruka (Rukatunturi HS142)	L _{cnx}	cancelled due to strong wind (rescheduled to Lahti on 6 March)				
1154	6	6 December 2025	(Poland) Wisła (Malinka HS134)	L _{839}	(Slovenia) Domen Prevc	(Germany) Philipp Raimund	(Japan) Ryōyū Kobayashi	(Slovenia) Anže Lanišek	
1155	7	7 December 2025	(Poland) Wisła (Malinka HS134)	L _{840}	(Slovenia) Domen Prevc	(Japan) Ryōyū Kobayashi	(Germany) Philipp Raimund	(Slovenia) Domen Prevc	
1156	8	13 December 2025	(Germany) Klingenthal (Note: Originally planned men's large hill event in Lake Placid (13 and 14 December) was cancelled and moved to Klingenthal (on the same date).) (Vogtland Arena HS140)	L _{841}	(Slovenia) Domen Prevc	(Austria) Stefan Kraft	(Germany) Philipp Raimund	(Slovenia) Domen Prevc	
1157	9	14 December 2025	(Germany) Klingenthal (Vogtland Arena HS140)	L _{842}	(Slovenia) Domen Prevc	(Japan) Ren Nikaidō	(Japan) Ryōyū Kobayashi	(Slovenia) Domen Prevc	
1158	10	20 December 2025	(Switzerland) Engelberg (Gross-Titlis HS140)	L _{843}	(Slovenia) Domen Prevc	(Germany) Felix Hoffmann	(Japan) Ren Nikaidō	(Slovenia) Domen Prevc	
1159	11	21 December 2025	(Switzerland) Engelberg (Gross-Titlis HS140)	L _{844}	(Japan) Ryōyū Kobayashi	(Slovenia) Domen Prevc	(Germany) Felix Hoffmann	(Slovenia) Domen Prevc	
1160	12	29 December 2025	(Germany) Oberstdorf (Schattenberg HS137)	L _{845}	(Slovenia) Domen Prevc	(Austria) Daniel Tschofenig	(Germany) Felix Hoffmann	(Slovenia) Domen Prevc	
1161	13	1 January 2026	(Germany) Garmisch-Pa (Olympiaschanze HS142)	L _{846}	(Slovenia) Domen Prevc	(Austria) Jan Hörl	(Austria) Stephan Embacher	(Slovenia) Domen Prevc	
1162	14	4 January 2026	(Austria) Innsbruck (Bergiselschanze HS128)	L _{847}	(Japan) Ren Nikaidō	(Slovenia) Domen Prevc	(Austria) Stephan Embacher	(Slovenia) Domen Prevc	
1163	15	6 January 2026	(Austria) Bischofshofen (Paul-Ausserleitner HS142)	L _{848}	(Austria) Daniel Tschofenig	(Slovenia) Domen Prevc	(Japan) Ryōyū Kobayashi	(Slovenia) Domen Prevc	
74th Four Hills Tournament Overall (29 December 2025 – 6 January 2026)					(Slovenia) Domen Prevc	(Austria) Jan Hörl	(Austria) Stephan Embacher	Four Hills Tournament	
1164	16	11 January 2026	(Poland) Zakopane (Wielka Krokiew HS140)	L _{849}	(Slovenia) Anže Lanišek	(Austria) Jan Hörl	(Austria) Manuel Fettner	(Slovenia) Domen Prevc	
1165	17	17 January 2026	(Japan) Sapporo (Okurayama HS137)	L _{850}	(Slovenia) Domen Prevc	(Japan) Naoki Nakamura	(Japan) Ren Nikaidō	(Slovenia) Domen Prevc	
1166	18	18 January 2026	(Japan) Sapporo (Okurayama HS137)	L _{851}	(Slovenia) Domen Prevc	(Japan) Ryōyū Kobayashi	(Austria) Daniel Tschofenig	(Slovenia) Domen Prevc	
FIS Ski Flying World Championships 2026 (23 – 24 January • Oberstdorf, Germany)
1167	19	31 January 2026	(Germany) Willingen (Mühlenkopf HS147)	L _{852}	(Slovenia) Domen Prevc	(Japan) Ren Nikaidō	(Germany) Karl Geiger	(Slovenia) Domen Prevc	
1168	20	1 February 2026	(Germany) Willingen (Mühlenkopf HS147)	L _{853}	(Slovenia) Domen Prevc	(Japan) Ren Nikaidō	(Germany) Philipp Raimund	(Slovenia) Domen Prevc	
2026 Winter Olympics (9 – 16 February • Val di Fiemme, Italy)
1169	21	28 February 2026	(Austria) Bad Mitterndorf (Kulm HS235)	F _{153}	(Slovenia) Domen Prevc	(Austria) Stephan Embacher	(Austria) Jonas Schuster	(Slovenia) Domen Prevc	
1170	22	1 March 2026	(Austria) Bad Mitterndorf (Kulm HS235)	F _{154}	(Slovenia) Domen Prevc	(Austria) Stephan Embacher	(Norway) Johann André Forfang	(Slovenia) Domen Prevc	
1171	23	(Note: Men's individual cancelled competition from Ruka (30 November) was rescheduled to Lahti (6 March), one round only.)6 March 2026	(Finland) Lahti (Salpausselkä HS130)	L _{854}	(Germany) Philipp Raimund	(Austria) Daniel Tschofenig	(Bulgaria) Vladimir Zografski	(Slovenia) Domen Prevc	
1172	24	7 March 2026	(Finland) Lahti (Salpausselkä HS130)	L _{855}	(Austria) Daniel Tschofenig	(Slovenia) Domen Prevc	(Japan) Ryōyū Kobayashi	(Slovenia) Domen Prevc	
1173	25	14 March 2026	(Norway) Oslo (Holmenkollen HS134)	L _{856}	(Switzerland) Gregor Deschwanden	(Austria) Maximilian Ortner	(Japan) Naoki Nakamura	(Slovenia) Domen Prevc	
1174	26	15 March 2026	(Norway) Oslo (Holmenkollen HS134)	L _{857}	(Japan) Tomofumi Naitō	(Slovenia) Anže Lanišek	(Finland) Antti Aalto	(Slovenia) Domen Prevc	
1175	27	21 March 2026	(Norway) Vikersund (Vikersundbakken HS240)	F _{155}	(Austria) Stephan Embacher	(Japan) Tomofumi Naitō	(Norway) Johann André Forfang	(Slovenia) Domen Prevc	
—		22 March 2026	(Norway) Vikersund (Vikersundbakken HS240)	F _{cnx}	cancelled due to strong wind				
qualifying		26 March 2026	(Slovenia) Planica (Letalnica b. Gorišek HS240)	F _{Qro}	(Slovenia) Anže Lanišek	(Slovenia) Domen Prevc	(Austria) Stephan Embacher	—	
1176	28	27 March 2026	(Slovenia) Planica (Letalnica b. Gorišek HS240)	F _{156}	(Slovenia) Domen Prevc	(Japan) Ren Nikaido	(Austria) Daniel Tschofenig	(Slovenia) Domen Prevc	
team		28 March 2026	(Slovenia) Planica (Letalnica b. Gorišek HS240)	F _{T}	(Norway) Marius Lindvik	(Austria) Stephan Embacher	(Japan) Naoki Nakamura	—	
1177	29	29 March 2026	(Slovenia) Planica (Letalnica b. Gorišek HS240)	F _{157}	(Norway) Marius Lindvik	(Slovenia) Domen Prevc	(Norway) Johann André Forfang	(Slovenia) Domen Prevc	
8th Planica7 Overall (26 – 29 March 2026)					(Slovenia) Domen Prevc	(Norway) Marius Lindvik	(Austria) Daniel Tschofenig	Planica7	
47th FIS World Cup Men's Overall (22 November 2025 – 29 March 2026)					(Slovenia) Domen Prevc	(Japan) Ryōyū Kobayashi	(Austria) Daniel Tschofenig	World Cup Overall	

=== Standings ===
==== Overall ====
Rank	after all 29 events	Points
1	(Slovenia) Domen Prevc	2148
2	(Japan) Ryōyū Kobayashi	1194
3	(Austria) Daniel Tschofenig	1159
4	(Japan) Ren Nikaidō	1109
5	(Slovenia) Anže Lanišek	1009
6	(Austria) Stephan Embacher	992
7	(Germany) Philipp Raimund	967
8	(Austria) Jan Hörl	772
9	(Germany) Felix Hoffmann	662
10	(Austria) Stefan Kraft	631

==== Nations Cup ====
Rank	after all 34 events	Points
1	Austria	6157
2	Slovenia	4412
3	Japan	4196
4	Germany	3183
5	Norway	2963
6	Poland	1258
7	Finland	1132
8	Switzerland	1004
9	France	543
10	United States	436

==== Prize money ====
Rank	after all 36 payouts	EUR
1	(Slovenia) Domen Prevc	496,557
2	(Austria) Daniel Tschofenig	194,975
3	(Japan) Ryōyū Kobayashi	192,725
4	(Japan) Ren Nikaidō	173,150
5	(Austria) Stephan Embacher	171,241
6	(Slovenia) Anže Lanišek	162,316
7	(Germany) Philipp Raimund	154,675
8	(Austria) Jan Hörl	141,250
9	(Germany) Felix Hoffmann	104,400
10	(Austria) Stefan Kraft	101,600

==== Ski flying ====
Rank	after all 5 events	Points
1	(Slovenia) Domen Prevc	425
2	(Austria) Stephan Embacher	294
3	(Norway) Johann André Forfang	250
4	(Norway) Marius Lindvik	211
5	(Austria) Daniel Tschofenig	184
6	(Germany) Andreas Wellinger	166
7	(Japan) Tomofumi Naitō	165
8	(Japan) Naoki Nakamura	146
9	(Austria) Jonas Schuster	129
	(Finland) Antti Aalto	129

==== Four Hills Tournament ====
Rank	after all 4 events	Points
1	(Slovenia) Domen Prevc	1195.6
2	(Austria) Jan Hörl	1153.3
3	(Austria) Stephan Embacher	1150.6
4	(Japan) Ren Nikaidō	1123.5
5	(Japan) Ryōyū Kobayashi	1123.1
6	(Germany) Felix Hoffmann	1120.3
7	(Austria) Daniel Tschofenig	1115.8
8	(Germany) Philipp Raimund	1089.6
9	(Slovenia) Anže Lanišek	1074.5
10	(Austria) Manuel Fettner	1056.5

==== Planica7 ====
Rank	after all 4 events	Points
1	(Slovenia) Domen Prevc	1525.6
2	(Norway) Marius Lindvik	1499.0
3	(Austria) Daniel Tschofenig	1470.0
4	(Norway) Johann André Forfang	1460.0
5	(Japan) Ren Nikaidō	1449.5
6	(Japan) Naoki Nakamura	1447.8
7	(Austria) Stephan Embacher	1432.0
8	(Slovenia) Anže Lanišek	1427.0
9	(Austria) Stefan Kraft	1411.1
10	(Germany) Karl Geiger	1410.3

== Women's Individual ==
Individual events in the World Cup history

Total	F	L	N	Winners
290	5	102	183	31

after flying hill event in Planica (28 March 2026)

=== Calendar ===
Event key: N – normal hill / L – large hill / F – flying hill
All	No.	Date	Place (Hill)	Size	Winner	Second	Third	Overall Leader	R.
258	1	22 November 2025	(Norway) Lillehammer (Lysgårdsbakken HS140)	L _{082}	(Japan) Nozomi Maruyama	(Canada) Abigail Strate	(Austria) Lisa Eder	(Japan) Nozomi Maruyama	
259	2	23 November 2025	(Norway) Lillehammer (Lysgårdsbakken HS140)	L _{083}	(Japan) Nozomi Maruyama	(Norway) Heidi Dyhre Traaserud	(Slovenia) Nika Prevc	(Japan) Nozomi Maruyama	
260	3	28 November 2025	(Sweden) Falun (Lugnet HS95/HS132)	N _{175}	(Japan) Nozomi Maruyama	(Slovenia) Nika Prevc	(Austria) Lisa Eder	(Japan) Nozomi Maruyama	
261	4	30 November 2025	(Sweden) Falun (Lugnet HS95/HS132)	L _{084}	(Slovenia) Nika Prevc	(Japan) Nozomi Maruyama	(Norway) Eirin Maria Kvandal	(Japan) Nozomi Maruyama	
262	5	4 December 2025	(Poland) Wisła (Malinka HS134)	L _{085}	(Norway) Anna Odine Strøm	(Canada) Abigail Strate	(Japan) Nozomi Maruyama	(Japan) Nozomi Maruyama	
263	6	5 December 2025	(Poland) Wisła (Malinka HS134)	L _{086}	(Slovenia) Nika Prevc	(Slovenia) Nika Vodan	(Norway) Eirin Maria Kvandal	(Japan) Nozomi Maruyama	
264	7	12 December 2025	(Germany) Klingenthal (Note: Originally planned women's large hill event in Lake Placid (12 and 13 December) was cancelled and moved to Klingenthal (on the same date).) (Vogtland Arena HS140)	L _{087}	(Japan) Nozomi Maruyama	(Slovenia) Nika Prevc	(Austria) Lisa Eder	(Japan) Nozomi Maruyama	
265	8	13 December 2025	(Germany) Klingenthal (Vogtland Arena HS140)	L _{088}	(Slovenia) Nika Prevc	(Japan) Nozomi Maruyama	(Norway) Anna Odine Strøm	(Japan) Nozomi Maruyama	
266	9	20 December 2025	(Switzerland) Engelberg (Gross-Titlis HS140)	L _{089}	(Japan) Nozomi Maruyama	(Slovenia) Nika Prevc	(Norway) Anna Odine Strøm	(Japan) Nozomi Maruyama	
267	10	21 December 2025	(Switzerland) Engelberg (Gross-Titlis HS140)	L _{090}	(Slovenia) Nika Prevc	(Norway) Anna Odine Strøm	(Germany) Katharina Schmid	(Japan) Nozomi Maruyama	
268	11	31 December 2025	(Germany) Garmisch-Pa (Olympiaschanze HS142)	L _{091}	(Slovenia) Nika Prevc	(Germany) Selina Freitag	(Japan) Nozomi Maruyama	(Japan) Nozomi Maruyama	
269	12	1 January 2026	(Germany) Oberstdorf (Schattenberg HS137)	L _{092}	(Canada) Abigail Strate	(China) Zeng Ping	(Germany) Selina Freitag	(Japan) Nozomi Maruyama	
3rd Two Nights Tour Overall (30 December 2025 – 1 January 2026)					(Slovenia) Nika Prevc	(Germany) Selina Freitag	(Japan) Nozomi Maruyama	Two Nights Tournament	
270	13	5 January 2026	(Austria) Villach (Alpenarena HS98)	N _{176}	(Slovenia) Nika Prevc	(Austria) Lisa Eder	(Germany) Selina Freitag	(Slovenia) Nika Prevc	
271	14	6 January 2026	(Austria) Villach (Alpenarena HS98)	N _{177}	(Slovenia) Nika Prevc	(Austria) Lisa Eder	(Germany) Agnes Reisch	(Slovenia) Nika Prevc	
272	15	10 January 2026	(Slovenia) Ljubno (Savina HS94)	N _{178}	(Slovenia) Nika Prevc	(Austria) Lisa Eder	(Germany) Selina Freitag	(Slovenia) Nika Prevc	
273	16	11 January 2026	(Slovenia) Ljubno (Savina HS94)	N _{179}	(Slovenia) Nika Prevc	(Austria) Lisa Eder	(Germany) Katharina Schmid	(Slovenia) Nika Prevc	
274	17	16 January 2026	(China) Zhangjiakou (Snow Ruyi HS140)	L _{093}	(Slovenia) Nika Prevc	(Japan) Nozomi Maruyama	(Germany) Selina Freitag	(Slovenia) Nika Prevc	
275	18	(Note: Individual women's event in Zhangjiakou (17 January) had only one round due to strong wind.)17 January 2026	(China) Zhangjiakou (Snow Ruyi HS140)	L _{094}	(Slovenia) Nika Prevc	(Norway) Anna Odine Strøm	(Japan) Nozomi Maruyama	(Slovenia) Nika Prevc	
276	19	20 January 2026	(Japan) Zaō (Yamagata HS102)	N _{180}	(Japan) Nozomi Maruyama	(Austria) Lisa Eder	(Germany) Selina Freitag	(Slovenia) Nika Prevc	
277	20	21 January 2026	(Japan) Zaō (Yamagata HS102)	N _{181}	(Austria) Lisa Eder	(Slovenia) Nika Prevc	(Canada) Abigail Strate	(Slovenia) Nika Prevc	
278	21	24 January 2026	(Japan) Sapporo (Okurayama HS137)	L _{095}	(Slovenia) Nika Prevc	(Canada) Abigail Strate	(Norway) Anna Odine Strøm	(Slovenia) Nika Prevc	
279	22	(Note: Individual women's event in Sapporo (25 January) had only one round due to strong wind.)25 January 2026	(Japan) Sapporo (Okurayama HS137)	L _{096}	(Slovenia) Nika Prevc	(Canada) Abigail Strate	(Norway) Heidi Dyhre Traaserud	(Slovenia) Nika Prevc	
280	23	31 January 2026	(Germany) Willingen (Mühlenkopf HS147)	L _{097}	(Norway) Eirin Maria Kvandal	(Slovenia) Nika Prevc	(Japan) Nozomi Maruyama	(Slovenia) Nika Prevc	
281	24	1 February 2026	(Germany) Willingen (Mühlenkopf HS147)	L _{098}	(Norway) Eirin Maria Kvandal	(Japan) Nozomi Maruyama	(Slovenia) Nika Prevc	(Slovenia) Nika Prevc	
2026 Winter Olympics (7 – 15 February • Val di Fiemme, Italy)
282	25	28 February 2026	(Austria) Hinzenbach (Aigner-Schanze HS90)	N _{182}	(Slovenia) Nika Prevc	(Austria) Lisa Eder	(Norway) Anna Odine Strøm	(Slovenia) Nika Prevc	
283	26	1 March 2026	(Austria) Hinzenbach (Aigner-Schanze HS90)	N _{183}	(Austria) Lisa Eder	(Norway) Anna Odine Strøm	(Slovenia) Nika Prevc	(Slovenia) Nika Prevc	
284	27	5 March 2026	(Finland) Lahti (Salpausselkä HS130)	L _{099}	(Slovenia) Nika Prevc	(Norway) Anna Odine Strøm	(Japan) Nozomi Maruyama	(Slovenia) Nika Prevc	
285	28	6 March 2026	(Finland) Lahti (Salpausselkä HS130)	L _{100}	(Slovenia) Nika Prevc	(Norway) Anna Odine Strøm	(Japan) Nozomi Maruyama	(Slovenia) Nika Prevc	
286	29	14 March 2026	(Norway) Oslo (Holmenkollen HS134)	L _{101}	(Slovenia) Nika Prevc	(Japan) Nozomi Maruyama	(Norway) Anna Odine Strøm	(Slovenia) Nika Prevc	
287	30	15 March 2026	(Norway) Oslo (Holmenkollen HS134)	L _{102}	(Japan) Yūki Itō	(Japan) Nozomi Maruyama	(Norway) Anna Odine Strøm	(Slovenia) Nika Prevc	
288	31	21 March 2026	(Norway) Vikersund (Vikersundbakken HS240)	F _{003}	(Norway) Eirin Maria Kvandal	(Sweden) Frida Westman	(Slovenia) Nika Prevc	(Slovenia) Nika Prevc	
289	32	(Note: Individual women's event in Vikersund (22 March) had only one round due to strong wind.)22 March 2026	(Norway) Vikersund (Vikersundbakken HS240)	F _{004}	(Norway) Eirin Maria Kvandal	(Slovenia) Nika Prevc	(Norway) Anna Odine Strøm	(Slovenia) Nika Prevc	
290	33	28 March 2026	(Slovenia) Planica (Letalnica b. Gorišek HS240)	F _{005}	(Slovenia) Nika Prevc	(Norway) Eirin Maria Kvandal	(Japan) Nozomi Maruyama	(Slovenia) Nika Prevc	
15th FIS World Cup Women's Overall (22 November 2025 – 28 March 2026)					(Slovenia) Nika Prevc	(Japan) Nozomi Maruyama	(Norway) Anna Odine Strøm	World Cup Overall	

=== Standings ===
==== Overall ====
Rank	after all 33 events	Points
1	(Slovenia) Nika Prevc	2676
2	(Japan) Nozomi Maruyama	1870
3	(Norway) Anna Odine Strøm	1628
4	(Austria) Lisa Eder	1417
5	(Germany) Selina Freitag	1248
6	(Canada) Abigail Strate	1202
7	(Germany) Agnes Reisch	1058
8	(Norway) Eirin Maria Kvandal	980
9	(Japan) Sara Takanashi	931
10	(Slovenia) Nika Vodan	916

==== Nations Cup ====
Rank	after all 35 events	Points
1	Japan	4984
2	Norway	4790
3	Slovenia	4330
4	Germany	3989
5	Austria	2302
6	Canada	1322
7	Finland	641
8	China	620
9	Italy	457
10	United States	439

==== Prize money ====
Rank	after all 35 payouts	EUR
1	(Slovenia) Nika Prevc	170,875
2	(Japan) Nozomi Maruyama	115,925
3	(Norway) Anna Odine Strøm	96,975
4	(Austria) Lisa Eder	76,650
5	(Germany) Selina Freitag	73,675
6	(Norway) Eirin Maria Kvandal	68,750
7	(Slovenia) Nika Vodan	68,175
8	(Canada) Abigail Strate	65,700
9	(Germany) Agnes Reisch	61,450
10	(Japan) Sara Takanashi	54,300

==== Ski flying ====
Rank	after all 3 events	Points
1	(Norway) Eirin Maria Kvandal	280
2	(Slovenia) Nika Prevc	240
3	(Norway) Anna Odine Strøm	155
4	(Sweden) Frida Westman	130
5	(Slovenia) Nika Vodan	124
6	(Japan) Yūki Itō	106
7	(Japan) Nozomi Maruyama	96
8	(Norway) Heidi Dyhre Traaserud	91
9	(Norway) Silje Opseth	80
10	(Canada) Abigail Strate	74

==== Two Nights Tour ====
Rank	after all 2 events	Points
1	(Slovenia) Nika Prevc	527.7
2	(Germany) Selina Freitag	505.3
3	(Japan) Nozomi Maruyama	496.9
4	(Austria) Lisa Eder	494.3
5	(Canada) Abigail Strate	493.9
6	(China) Zeng Ping	484.8
7	(Japan) Sara Takanashi	483.7
8	(Germany) Agnes Reisch	473.4
9	(Germany) Katharina Schmid	468.8
10	(Slovenia) Nika Vodan	461.8

== Team events ==
Team events in the World Cup history

Total	F	L	N	Winners	Competition
12	—	9	3	5	Mixed team
124	28	94	2	7	Men's team
9	1	7	1	4	Men's super team

after men's super team L event in Lahti (8 March 2026)

=== Calendar ===
Event key: F – flying hill, L – large hill, N – normal hill
All	No.	Date	Place (Hill)	Size	Winner	Second	Third	R.
Mixed team
11	1	21 November 2025	(Norway) Lillehammer (Lysgårdsbakken HS140)	L _{008}	Japan: 1. Nozomi Maruyama; 2. Ren Nikaidō; 3. Yūki Itō; 4. Ryōyū Kobayashi	Slovenia: 1. Nika Prevc; 2. Timi Zajc; 3. Nika Vodan; 4. Domen Prevc	Austria: 1. Julia Mühlbacher; 2. Stefan Kraft; 3. Lisa Eder; 4. Jan Hörl	
12	2	(Note: Mixed team event in Willingen (30 January) had only one round due to strong wind.)30 January 2026	(Germany) Willingen (Mühlenkopf HS147)	L _{009}	Slovenia: 1. Nika Vodan; 2. Timi Zajc; 3. Nika Prevc; 4. Domen Prevc	Germany: 1. Agnes Reisch; 2. Karl Geiger; 3. Selina Freitag; 4. Philipp Raimund	Japan: 1. Sara Takanashi; 2. Ren Nikaidō; 3. Nozomi Maruyama; 4. Ryōyū Kobayashi	
2026 Winter Olympics (10 February • Val di Fiemme, Italy)
Men's super team
8	1	10 January 2026	(Poland) Zakopane (Wielka Krokiew HS140)	L _{006}	Austria: 1. Jan Hörl; 2. Stephan Embacher	Slovenia: 1. Timi Zajc; 2. Anže Lanišek	Poland: 1. Dawid Kubacki; 2. Kacper Tomasiak	
2026 Winter Olympics (16 February • Val di Fiemme, Italy)
9	2	8 March 2026	(Finland) Lahti (Salpausselkä HS130)	L _{007}	Austria: 1. Jan Hörl; 2. Daniel Tschofenig	Slovenia: 1. Anže Lanišek; 2. Domen Prevc	Finland: 1. Niko Kytösaho; 2. Antti Aalto	
Men's team
125	1	28 March 2026	(Slovenia) Planica (Letalnica b. Gorišek HS240)	F _{029}	Austria: 1. Daniel Tschofenig; 2. Markus Müller; 3. Stefan Kraft; 4. Stephan Embacher	Japan: 1. Naoki Nakamura; 2. Tomofumi Naito; 3. Ryōyū Kobayashi; 4. Ren Nikaidō	Norway: 1. Robin Pedersen; 2. Isak Andreas Langmo; 3. Marius Lindvik; 4. Johann André Forfang	

== Podium table by nation ==
Table showing the World Cup podium places (gold–1st place, silver–2nd place, bronze–3rd place) by the countries represented by the athletes.

- after men's flying event in Planica (29 March 2026)

Rank	Nation	Gold	Silver	Bronze	Total
1	Slovenia	36	18	6	60
2	Japan	12	16	15	43
3	Austria	10	16	11	37
4	Norway	6	7	14	27
5	Germany	1	4	16	21
6	Canada	1	4	1	6
7	Switzerland	1	0	0	1
8	China	0	1	0	1
8	Sweden	0	1	0	1
10	Finland	0	0	2	2
11	Bulgaria	0	0	1	1
11	Poland	0	0	1	1
Totals (12 entries)		67	67	67	201

== Point distribution ==
The table shows the number of points won in the 2025–26 FIS Ski Jumping World Cup for men and women.

Place	1	2	3	4	5	6	7	8	9	10	11	12	13	14	15	16	17	18	19	20	21	22	23	24	25	26	27	28	29	30
Individual	100	80	60	50	45	40	36	32	29	26	24	22	20	18	16	15	14	13	12	11	10	9	8	7	6	5	4	3	2	1
M + W + Mixed Team	400	350	300	250	200	150	100	50	points not awarded
Super Team	200	160	120	100	80	70	60	50	40	30	20	10	points not awarded

== Qualifications ==
In case the number of participating athletes is 50 (men) / 40 (women) or lower, a Prologue competition round must be organized.

=== Men ===
No.	Place	Qualifications	Competition	Size	Winner	R.
1	(Norway) Lillehammer	22 November 2025		L	(Austria) Stephan Embacher	
2	(Norway) Lillehammer	23 November 2025		L	(Austria) Jan Hörl	
3	(Sweden) Falun	25 November 2025		N	(Austria) Daniel Tschofenig	
4	(Sweden) Falun	26 November 2025		L	(Austria) Stephan Embacher	
5	(Finland) Ruka	29 November 2025		L	(Austria) Daniel Tschofenig	
–	(Finland) Ruka	30 November 2025		L	cancelled due to strong wind	
6	(Poland) Wisła	5 December 2025	6 December 2025	L	(Japan) Ryōyū Kobayashi	
7	(Poland) Wisła	7 December 2025		L	(Slovenia) Domen Prevc	
8	(Germany) Klingenthal	13 December 2025		L	(Germany) Philipp Raimund	
9	(Germany) Klingenthal	14 December 2025		L	(Norway) Marius Lindvik	
10	(Switzerland) Engelberg	19 December 2025	20 December 2025	L	(Germany) Felix Hoffmann	
11	(Switzerland) Engelberg	21 December 2025		L	(Germany) Felix Hoffmann	
12	(Germany) Oberstdorf	28 December 2025	29 December 2025	L	(Slovenia) Domen Prevc	
13	(Germany) Garmisch-Partenkirchen	31 December 2025	1 January 2026	L	(Slovenia) Domen Prevc	
14	(Austria) Innsbruck	3 January 2026	4 January 2026	L	(Austria) Jan Hörl	
15	(Austria) Bischofshofen	5 January 2026	6 January 2026	L	(Slovenia) Domen Prevc	
16	(Poland) Zakopane	10 January 2026	11 January 2026	L	(Austria) Manuel Fettner	
17	(Japan) Sapporo	16 January 2026	17 January 2026	L	(Japan) Ryōyū Kobayashi	
18	(Japan) Sapporo	18 January 2026		L	(Slovenia) Domen Prevc	
19	(Germany) Willingen	31 January 2026		L	(Austria) Daniel Tschofenig	
20	(Germany) Willingen	1 February 2026		L	(Slovenia) Domen Prevc	
21	(Austria) Bad Mitterndorf	27 February 2026	28 February 2026	F	(Austria) Stephan Embacher	
22	(Austria) Bad Mitterndorf	1 March 2026		F	(Slovenia) Domen Prevc	
–	(Finland) Lahti	6 March 2026		L	no qualifications, all 68 athletes at start	
23	(Finland) Lahti	7 March 2026		L	(Japan) Ryōyū Kobayashi	
24	(Norway) Oslo	13 March 2026	14 March 2026	L	(Slovenia) Domen Prevc	
25	(Norway) Oslo	15 March 2026		L	(Slovenia) Domen Prevc	
26	(Norway) Vikersund	20 March 2026	21 March 2026	F	(Slovenia) Domen Prevc	
–	(Norway) Vikersund	22 March 2026		F	cancelled due to strong wind	
27	(Slovenia) Planica	26 March 2026	27 March 2026	F	(Slovenia) Anže Lanišek	

=== Women ===
No.	Place	Qualifications	Competition	Size	Winner	R.
1	(Norway) Lillehammer	22 November 2025		L	(Japan) Nozomi Maruyama	
2	(Norway) Lillehammer	23 November 2025		L	(Japan) Nozomi Maruyama	
–	(Sweden) Falun	28 November 2025		N	cancelled, all 65 athletes at start	
3	(Sweden) Falun	30 November 2025		L	(Japan) Nozomi Maruyama	
4	(Poland) Wisła	4 December 2025		L	(Norway) Anna Odine Strøm	
5	(Poland) Wisła	5 December 2025		L	(Slovenia) Nika Vodan	
6	(Germany) Klingenthal	12 December 2025		L	(Japan) Nozomi Maruyama	
7	(Germany) Klingenthal	13 December 2025		L	(Japan) Nozomi Maruyama	
8	(Switzerland) Engelberg	20 December 2025		L	(Slovenia) Nika Prevc	
9	(Switzerland) Engelberg	21 December 2025		L	(Slovenia) Nika Prevc	
10	(Germany) Garmisch-Partenkirchen	30 December 2025	31 December 2025	L	(Japan) Nozomi Maruyama	
11	(Germany) Oberstdorf	1 January 2026		L	(Slovenia) Nika Prevc	
12	(Austria) Villach	5 January 2026		N	(Slovenia) Nika Prevc	
13	(Austria) Villach	6 January 2026		N	(Slovenia) Nika Prevc	
14	(Slovenia) Ljubno	9 January 2026	10 January 2026	N	(Slovenia) Nika Prevc	
15	(Slovenia) Ljubno	11 January 2026		N	(Slovenia) Nika Prevc	
16	(China) Zhangjiakou	15 January 2026	16 January 2026	L	(Slovenia) Nika Prevc	
–	(China) Zhangjiakou	17 January 2026		L	cancelled, all 47 athletes at start	
17	(Japan) Zaō	20 January 2026		N	cancelled, all 48 athletes at start	
18	(Japan) Zaō	21 January 2026		N	(Slovenia) Nika Prevc	
19	(Japan) Sapporo	23 January 2026	24 January 2026	L	(Slovenia) Nika Prevc	
–	(Japan) Sapporo	24 January 2026		L	cancelled, all 44 athletes at start	
–	(Germany) Willingen	31 January 2026		L	cancelled, all 34 athletes at start	
–	(Germany) Willingen	1 February 2026		L	cancelled, all 34 athletes at start	
20	(Austria) Hinzenbach	28 February 2026		N	(Austria) Lisa Eder	
21	(Austria) Hinzenbach	1 March 2026		N	(Slovenia) Nika Prevc	
22	(Finland) Lahti	5 March 2026		L	(Norway) Anna Odine Strøm	
–	(Finland) Lahti	6 March 2026		L	cancelled, all 41 athletes at start	
23	(Norway) Oslo	13 March 2026	14 March 2026	L	(Japan) Yūki Itō	
24	(Norway) Oslo	15 March 2026		L	(Slovenia) Nika Prevc	
25	(Norway) Vikersund	20 March 2026	21 March 2026	F	(Norway) Eirin Maria Kvandal	
26	(Norway) Vikersund	22 March 2026		F	(Sweden) Frida Westman	

== Prize money distribution ==
New higher prize money will be distributed this season in Euro (€) (no more in Swiss franc), and will be 20% higher in total for men (€102,250) than in previous season. Also men's qualification winners will receive higher awards; €3,175 (normal and large hills) and €5,291 (ski flying hills).

Women will also have higher prize money with Top 25 awarded, but much higher prize in ski flying for Top 15 only.

=== Men's Individual ===
1st	2nd	3rd	4th	5th	6th	7th	8th	9th	10th	11th	12th	13th	14th	15th	Total: €102,250
€15,000	€11,500	€9,000	€7,500	€6,000	€5,800	€4,400	€4,000	€3,600	€3,200	€3,000	€2,800	€2,600	€2,400	€2,250	Total: €102,250
16th	17th	18th	19th	20th	21st	22nd	23rd	24th	25th	26th	27th	28th	29th	30th	Total: €102,250
€2,100	€1,950	€1,800	€1,650	€1,500	€1,400	€1,300	€1,200	€1,100	€1,000	€900	€800	€700	€600	€500	Total: €102,250

=== Men's and mixed team ===
1st	2nd	3rd	4th	5th	6th	7th	8th	Total: €97,800
€34,000	€24,000	€14,000	€9,200	€6,000	€4,700	€3,500	€2,400	Total: €97,800

=== Men's super team ===
1st	2nd	3rd	4th	5th	6th	7th	8th	9th	10th	11th	12th	Total: €97,900
€25,500	€17,500	€14,000	€10,500	€8,000	€5,800	€4,600	€3,600	€3,000	€2,400	€1,800	€1,200	Total: €97,900

=== Women's Individual ===
Normal and Large hill
1st	2nd	3rd	4th	5th	6th	7th	8th	9th	10th	11th	12th	13th	14th	15th	Total: €35,200
€5,000	€4,000	€3,000	€2,600	€2,250	€2,000	€1,800	€1,600	€1,400	€1,300	€1,200	€1,100	€1,000	€900	€800	Total: €35,200
16th	17th	18th	19th	20th	21st	22nd	23rd	24th	25th						Total: €35,200
€750	€700	€650	€600	€550	€500	€450	€400	€350	€300						Total: €35,200
Ski flying hill
1st	2nd	3rd	4th	5th	6th	7th	8th	9th	10th	11th	12th	13th	14th	15th	Total: €69,600
€11,500	€9,200	€7,500	€6,000	€5,000	€4,500	€4,000	€3,600	€3,300	€3,000	€2,800	€2,600	€2,400	€2,200	€2,000	Total: €69,600

=== Qualification winners (men) ===
Men
Normal hill	€3,175
Large hill	€3,175
Flying hill	€5,291

== Achievements ==
First World Cup career victory

Men

- (Japan) Ren Nikaidō (24), in his 5th season – the WC 14 in Innsbruck
- (Germany) Philipp Raimund (25), in his 6th season – the WC 23 in Lahti
- (Switzerland) Gregor Deschwanden (34), in his 16th season – the WC 25 in Oslo
- (Japan) Tomofumi Naitō (33), in his 6th season – the WC 26 in Oslo
- (Austria) Stephan Embacher (20), in his 3rd season – the WC 27 in Vikersund

Women

- (Japan) Nozomi Maruyama (27), in her 7th season – the WC 1 in Lillehammer
- (Canada) Abigail Strate (24), in her 10th season – the WC 12 in Oberstdorf
- (Austria) Lisa Eder (24), in her 8th season – the WC 20 in Zaō

First World Cup podium

Men

- (Austria) Stephan Embacher (19), in his 3rd season – the WC 4 in Falun – 2nd place
- (Japan) Ren Nikaidō (24), in his 5th season – the WC 5 in Ruka – 2nd place
- (Germany) Felix Hoffmann (28), in his 6th season – the WC 2 in Lillehammer – 3rd place
- (Austria) Jonas Schuster (22), in his 4th season – the WC 21 in Bad Mitterndorf – 3rd place
- (Bulgaria) Vladimir Zografski (32), in his 18th season – the WC 23 in Lahti – 3rd place
- (Japan) Tomofumi Naitō (33), in his 6th season – the WC 26 in Oslo – 1st place
- (Finland) Antti Aalto (30), in his 11th season – the WC 26 in Oslo – 3rd place

Women

- (Norway) Heidi Dyhre Traaserud (22), in her 3rd season – the WC 2 in Lillehammer – 2nd place
- (China) Zeng Ping (21), in her 2nd season – the WC 12 in Oberstdorf – 2nd place

Number of wins this season (in brackets are all-time wins)

Men

- (Slovenia) Domen Prevc – 14 (23)
- (Slovenia) Anže Lanišek – 3 (11)
- (Austria) Daniel Tschofenig – 3 (11)
- (Japan) Ryōyū Kobayashi – 2 (37)
- (Austria) Stefan Kraft – 1 (46)
- (Norway) Marius Lindvik – 1 (9)
- (Japan) Ren Nikaidō – 1 (1)
- (Germany) Philipp Raimund – 1 (1)
- (Switzerland) Gregor Deschwanden – 1 (1)
- (Japan) Tomofumi Naito – 1 (1)
- (Austria) Stephan Embacher – 1 (1)

Women

- (Slovenia) Nika Prevc – 18 (40)
- (Japan) Nozomi Maruyama – 6 (6)
- (Norway) Eirin Maria Kvandal – 4 (10)
- (Austria) Lisa Eder – 2 (2)
- (Japan) Yūki Itō – 1 (10)
- (Norway) Anna Odine Strøm – 1 (4)
- (Canada) Abigail Strate – 1 (1)

== Retirements ==
The following notable ski jumpers, who competed in the World Cup, retire during or after the 2025–26 season:

Men

- (Canada) Mackenzie Boyd-Clowes
- (United States) Decker Dean
- (Austria) Manuel Fettner
- (Austria) Daniel Huber
- (Austria) Clemens Leitner
- (Germany) Justin Lisso
- (Poland) Kamil Stoch

Women

- (United States) Annika Belshaw
- (Germany) Anna Hollandt
- (United States) Paige Jones
- (Slovenia) Ema Klinec
- (Japan) Yūka Kobayashi
- (Germany) Katharina Schmid

== See also ==
- 2025 FIS Ski Jumping Grand Prix
- 2025–26 FIS Ski Jumping Continental Cup (men)
- 2025–26 FIS Ski Jumping Inter-Continental Cup (women)
