= FIS Nordic World Ski Championships 2025 – Men's individual large hill =

Men's individual large hill at the FIS Nordic World Ski Championships 2025
- Venue: Granåsen Ski Centre
- Location: Trondheim, Norway
- Dates: 8 March
- Competitors: 61 from 20 nations
- Winning points: 301.8

Medalists
| gold medal | Domen Prevc | Slovenia |
| silver medal | Jan Hörl | Austria |
| bronze medal | Ryōyū Kobayashi | Japan |

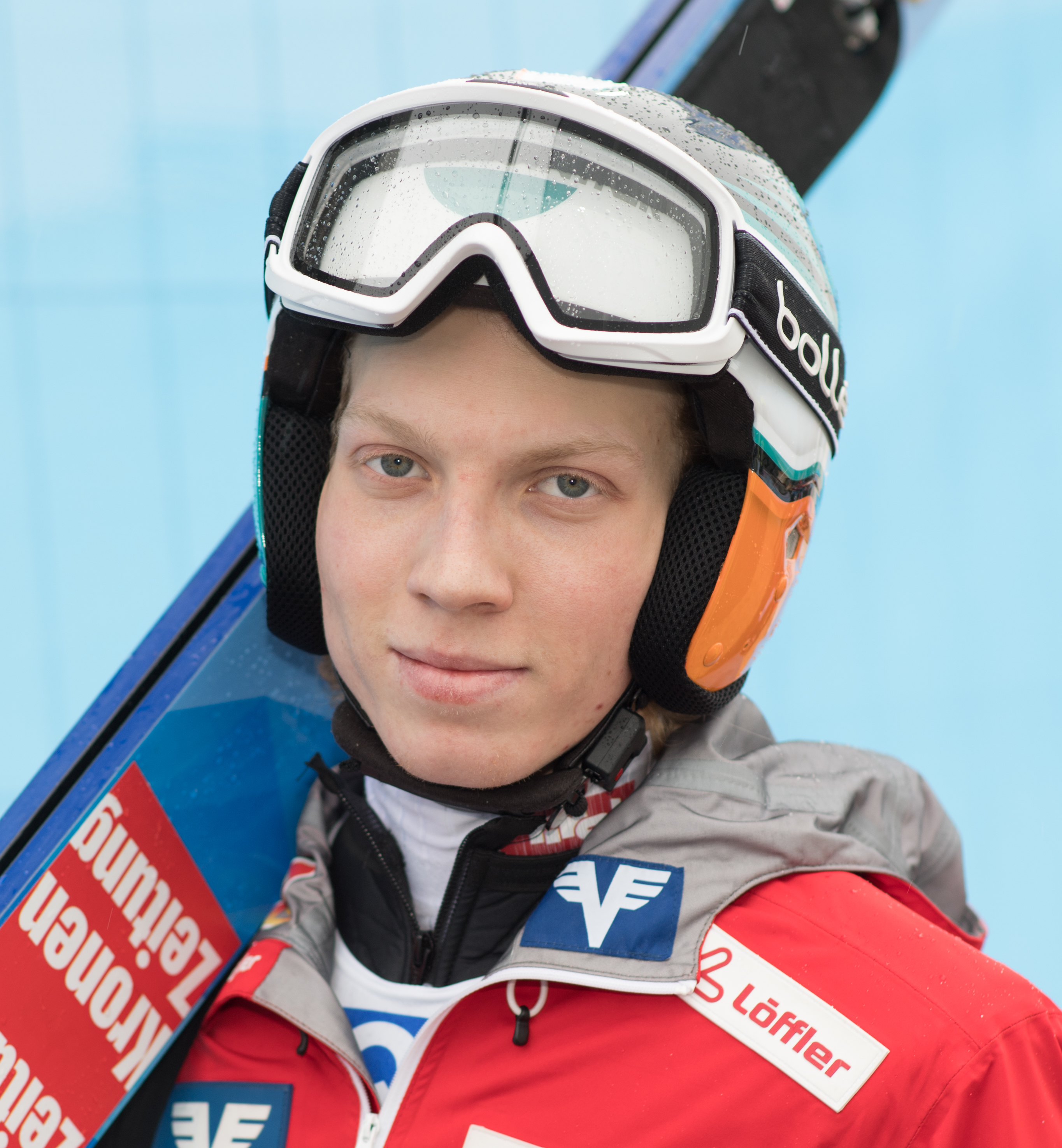
Seefeld, March 1, 2019: FIS Nordic World Ski Championships, Men Ski Jump HS 109.

The Men's individual large hill competition at the FIS Nordic World Ski Championships 2025 was held on 8 March 2025.

== Results ==
=== Qualification ===
The qualification was started at 14:15.

| Rank | Bib | Name | Country | Distance (m) | Points | Notes |
|---|---|---|---|---|---|---|
| 1 | 50 | Marius Lindvik | Norway | 143.0 | 154.4 | Q |
| 2 | 51 | Ryoyu Kobayashi | Japan | 140.0 | 154.0 | Q |
| 3 | 46 | Domen Prevc | Slovenia | 140.5 | 151.9 | Q |
| 4 | 58 | Johann André Forfang | Norway | 138.5 | 151.0 | Q |
| 5 | 60 | Jan Hörl | Austria | 133.0 | 140.3 | Q |
| 6 | 38 | Philipp Raimund | Germany | 139.5 | 138.8 | Q |
| 7 | 53 | Andreas Wellinger | Germany | 130.5 | 135.8 | Q |
| 8 | 56 | Gregor Deschwanden | Switzerland | 129.0 | 134.7 | Q |
| 9 | 59 | Stefan Kraft | Austria | 129.0 | 133.6 | Q |
| 9 | 52 | Anže Lanišek | Slovenia | 129.0 | 133.6 | Q |
| 11 | 29 | Robert Johansson | Norway | 135.0 | 131.4 | Q |
| 12 | 54 | Maximilian Ortner | Austria | 128.0 | 130.2 | Q |
| 13 | 31 | Antti Aalto | Finland | 131.5 | 127.9 | Q |
| 14 | 36 | Killian Peier | Switzerland | 131.0 | 126.9 | Q |
| 15 | 55 | Kristoffer Eriksen Sundal | Norway | 127.5 | 126.6 | Q |
| 16 | 49 | Paweł Wąsek | Poland | 128.0 | 126.1 | Q |
| 17 | 30 | Alex Insam | Italy | 131.5 | 125.9 | Q |
| 18 | 18 | Kasperi Valto | Finland | 133.0 | 125.7 | Q |
| 19 | 43 | Artti Aigro | Estonia | 126.5 | 122.4 | Q |
| 20 | 42 | Aleksander Zniszczoł | Poland | 125.0 | 121.3 | Q |
| 21 | 57 | Pius Paschke | Germany | 124.0 | 119.9 | Q |
| 22 | 37 | Vladimir Zografski | Bulgaria | 125.5 | 119.3 | Q |
| 23 | 33 | Lovro Kos | Slovenia | 128.0 | 118.8 | Q |
| 24 | 19 | Yanick Wasser | Switzerland | 133.0 | 118.6 | Q |
| 25 | 61 | Daniel Tschofenig | Austria | 122.5 | 117.5 | Q |
| 26 | 41 | Kevin Bickner | United States | 122.5 | 115.6 | Q |
| 27 | 35 | Jakub Wolny | Poland | 126.0 | 115.1 | Q |
| 28 | 27 | Yukiya Sato | Japan | 127.0 | 114.1 | Q |
| 29 | 1 | Vitaliy Kalinichenko | Ukraine | 123.5 | 113.0 | Q |
| 30 | 32 | Yevhen Marusiak | Ukraine | 125.5 | 112.1 | Q |
| 31 | 45 | Ren Nikaido | Japan | 120.0 | 112.0 | Q |
| 32 | 47 | Timi Zajc | Slovenia | 120.0 | 111.5 | Q |
| 33 | 48 | Karl Geiger | Germany | 117.5 | 110.5 | Q |
| 34 | 39 | Valentin Foubert | France | 119.5 | 108.9 | Q |
| 35 | 28 | Erik Belshaw | United States | 125.0 | 108.1 | Q |
| 36 | 17 | Simon Ammann | Switzerland | 126.5 | 107.5 | Q |
| 37 | 40 | Naoki Nakamura | Japan | 119.0 | 107.2 | Q |
| 38 | 44 | Tate Frantz | United States | 119.0 | 106.4 | Q |
| 39 | 24 | Žak Mogel | Slovenia | 124.5 | 106.3 | Q |
| 40 | 23 | Eetu Nousiainen | Finland | 122.0 | 105.7 | Q |
| 41 | 34 | Dawid Kubacki | Poland | 119.5 | 102.4 | Q |
| 42 | 9 | Song Qiwu | China | 120.5 | 98.4 | Q |
| 43 | 7 | Francesco Cecon | Italy | 118.5 | 98.0 | Q |
| 44 | 16 | Vilho Palosaari | Finland | 116.5 | 95.4 | Q |
| 45 | 25 | Fatih Arda İpcioğlu | Turkey | 117.5 | 93.8 | Q |
| 46 | 21 | Roman Koudelka | Czech Republic | 115.5 | 91.4 | Q |
| 47 | 20 | Jason Colby | United States | 116.0 | 87.9 | Q |
| 48 | 8 | Kaimar Vagul | Estonia | 111.0 | 82.0 | Q |
| 49 | 11 | Hektor Kapustík | Slovakia | 111.0 | 80.8 | Q |
| 50 | 14 | Enzo Milesi | France | 105.5 | 79.7 | Q |
| 51 | 10 | Daniel Škarka | Czech Republic | 110.5 | 79.1 | |
| 52 | 22 | Ilya Mizernykh | Kazakhstan | 106.0 | 76.6 | |
| 53 | 5 | Daniel Cacina | Romania | 107.5 | 76.3 | |
| 54 | 3 | Zhen Weijie | China | 107.0 | 74.4 | |
| 55 | 26 | Danil Vassilyev | Kazakhstan | 106.5 | 72.3 | |
| 56 | 13 | Sabirzhan Muminov | Kazakhstan | 100.5 | 65.7 | |
| 57 | 4 | Svyatoslav Nazarenko | Kazakhstan | 103.0 | 62.3 | |
| 58 | 2 | David Rygl | Czech Republic | 99.5 | 59.3 | |
| 59 | 15 | Muhammed Ali Bedir | Turkey | 98.5 | 54.5 | |
| 60 | 12 | Lyu Yixin | China | 96.5 | 50.1 | |
| 61 | 6 | Zheng Pengbo | China | 85.5 | 30.7 | |

=== Final ===
The first round was started at 15:45 and the second round at 16:52.

| Rank | Bib | Name | Country | Round 1 | | | Final round | | | Total |
| Rank | Bib | Name | Country | Distance (m) | Points | Rank | Distance (m) | Points | Rank | Points |
|---|---|---|---|---|---|---|---|---|---|---|
| 1st place, gold medalist(s) | 35 | Domen Prevc | Slovenia | 138.0 | 146.4 | 1 | 140.5 | 155.4 | 1 | 301.8 |
| 2nd place, silver medalist(s) | 49 | Jan Hörl | Austria | 134.0 | 141.8 | 3 | 137.0 | 144.8 | 2 | 286.6 |
| 3rd place, bronze medalist(s) | 40 | Ryoyu Kobayashi | Japan | 135.5 | 141.3 | 5 | 137.0 | 143.4 | 3 | 284.7 |
| 4 | 41 | Anže Lanišek | Slovenia | 132.5 | 137.3 | 7 | 136.0 | 139.1 | 4 | 276.4 |
| 5 | 27 | Philipp Raimund | Germany | 137.5 | 140.9 | 6 | 133.0 | 133.2 | 9 | 274.1 |
| 6 | 43 | Maximilian Ortner | Austria | 128.5 | 129.9 | 10 | 136.0 | 138.8 | 5 | 268.5 |
| 7 | 45 | Gregor Deschwanden | Switzerland | 129.0 | 132.7 | 8 | 133.5 | 134.9 | 8 | 267.6 |
| 8 | 42 | Andreas Wellinger | Germany | 128.0 | 129.3 | 13 | 137.0 | 137.7 | 6 | 267.0 |
| 9 | 50 | Daniel Tschofenig | Austria | 127.0 | 127.1 | 14 | 134.5 | 135.4 | 7 | 262.5 |
| 10 | 22 | Lovro Kos | Slovenia | 131.5 | 129.6 | 11 | 131.5 | 127.6 | 11 | 257.2 |
| 11 | 38 | Paweł Wąsek | Poland | 129.5 | 130.2 | 9 | 130.5 | 126.6 | 12 | 256.8 |
| 12 | 48 | Stefan Kraft | Austria | 124.5 | 122.7 | 17 | 129.5 | 130.3 | 10 | 253.0 |
| 13 | 20 | Antti Aalto | Finland | 130.0 | 129.5 | 12 | 128.0 | 123.0 | 15 | 252.5 |
| 14 | 33 | Tate Frantz | United States | 125.0 | 126.1 | 16 | 126.0 | 122.3 | 16 | 248.4 |
| 15 | 23 | Dawid Kubacki | Poland | 126.0 | 122.3 | 18 | 127.5 | 123.6 | 14 | 245.9 |
| 16 | 21 | Yevhen Marusiak | Ukraine | 130.5 | 127.1 | 14 | 125.5 | 118.8 | 19 | 245.9 |
| 17 | 26 | Vladimir Zografski | Bulgaria | 126.0 | 119.2 | 22 | 124.0 | 125.0 | 13 | 244.2 |
| 18 | 32 | Artti Aigro | Estonia | 126.5 | 121.7 | 19 | 123.5 | 116.2 | 21 | 237.9 |
| 19 | 18 | Robert Johansson | Norway | 124.5 | 117.1 | 25 | 122.0 | 120.2 | 18 | 237.3 |
| 20 | 25 | Killian Peier | Switzerland | 126.5 | 119.5 | 21 | 118.5 | 114.6 | 25 | 234.1 |
| 21 | 37 | Karl Geiger | Germany | 122.5 | 112.3 | 30 | 123.5 | 121.2 | 17 | 233.5 |
| 22 | 31 | Aleksander Zniszczoł | Poland | 122.0 | 115.2 | 28 | 122.0 | 118.0 | 20 | 233.2 |
| 23 | 9 | Kasperi Valto | Finland | 124.5 | 118.4 | 24 | 119.5 | 113.4 | 26 | 231.8 |
| 24 | 10 | Yanick Wasser | Switzerland | 125.0 | 120.8 | 20 | 121.5 | 110.9 | 27 | 231.7 |
| 25 | 29 | Naoki Nakamura | Japan | 120.5 | 116.2 | 26 | 120.5 | 115.1 | 24 | 231.3 |
| 26 | 16 | Yukiya Sato | Japan | 125.5 | 115.6 | 27 | 121.0 | 115.2 | 23 | 230.8 |
| 27 | 24 | Jakub Wolny | Poland | 123.5 | 114.7 | 29 | 120.0 | 115.3 | 22 | 230.0 |
| 28 | 46 | Pius Paschke | Germany | 123.0 | 119.1 | 23 | 113.5 | 102.9 | 28 | 222.0 |
| 29 | 39 | Marius Lindvik | Norway | 138.0 | 145.7 | 2 | Disqualified | | | 145.7 |
| 30 | 47 | Johann André Forfang | Norway | 134.5 | 141.4 | 4 | Disqualified | | | 141.4 |
| 31 | 19 | Alex Insam | Italy | 120.0 | 110.6 | 31 | Did not qualify | | | |
| 32 | 30 | Kevin Bickner | United States | 119.5 | 110.3 | 32 | Did not qualify | | | |
| 33 | 1 | Vitaliy Kalinichenko | Ukraine | 120.5 | 108.9 | 33 | Did not qualify | | | |
| 34 | 2 | Francesco Cecon | Italy | 122.0 | 107.7 | 34 | Did not qualify | | | |
| 35 | 8 | Simon Ammann | Switzerland | 120.0 | 107.1 | 35 | Did not qualify | | | |
| 36 | 28 | Valentin Foubert | France | 119.5 | 106.4 | 36 | Did not qualify | | | |
| 37 | 13 | Eetu Nousiainen | Finland | 122.0 | 106.4 | 37 | Did not qualify | | | |
| 38 | 14 | Žak Mogel | Slovenia | 122.0 | 105.6 | 38 | Did not qualify | | | |
| 39 | 11 | Jason Colby | United States | 120.5 | 104.7 | 39 | Did not qualify | | | |
| 40 | 12 | Roman Koudelka | Czech Republic | 120.5 | 103.9 | 39 | Did not qualify | | | |
| 41 | 17 | Erik Belshaw | United States | 118.0 | 101.3 | 41 | Did not qualify | | | |
| 42 | 34 | Ren Nikaido | Japan | 113.5 | 98.0 | 42 | Did not qualify | | | |
| 43 | 6 | Enzo Milesi | France | 114.5 | 96.6 | 43 | Did not qualify | | | |
| 44 | 15 | Fatih Arda İpcioğlu | Turkey | 113.0 | 89.7 | 44 | Did not qualify | | | |
| 45 | 36 | Timi Zajc | Slovenia | 111.5 | 85.7 | 45 | Did not qualify | | | |
| 46 | 4 | Song Qiwu | China | 108.5 | 84.4 | 46 | Did not qualify | | | |
| 47 | 7 | Vilho Palosaari | Finland | 106.5 | 79.7 | 47 | Did not qualify | | | |
| 48 | 5 | Hektor Kapustík | Slovakia | 100.5 | 69.7 | 48 | Did not qualify | | | |
| 49 | 3 | Kaimar Vagul | Estonia | 100.5 | 62.9 | 49 | Did not qualify | | | |
| | 44 | Kristoffer Eriksen Sundal | Norway | Disqualified | | | | | | |
