= Jason Colby =

Jason Colby may refer to:

- Jason Colby (The Colbys), a character from the TV series The Colbys, played by Charlton Heston
- Jason Colby (ski jumper), American ski jumper
