= Jason Colby (ski jumper) =

American ski jumper (born 2006)

Personal information
- Born: March 30, 2006 (age 20) Steamboat Springs, Colorado, United States

Sport
- Sport: Ski jumping
- Club: Steamboat Springs WSC

World Cup career
- Seasons: 2024–present
- Indiv. starts: 27
- Team starts: 4

Achievements and titles
- Personal bests: 195.0 m (639.8 ft); Planica, 27 March 2026
Medal record
Men's ski jumping
Representing United States
Junior World Championship
Silver medal – second place	2025 Lake Placid	Mixed team NH
Bronze medal – third place	2025 Lake Placid	Team NH
Bronze medal – third place	2026 Lillehammer	Individual NH
- Updated on 21 November 2026

Jason Colby (born March 30, 2006) is an American ski jumper.

== Career ==
On February 17, 2024, he made his World Cup home debut at Sapporo with 48th place.

On November 30, 2024, he made his first World Cup points at Ruka with 28th place.

Colby finished 20th in the Men's normal hill individual event at the 2026 Winter Olympics.

On September 20, 2026, he won his first major event with his victory on the normal hill jump at Râșnov in the FIS Grand Prix after finishing second the day before.

== Major tournament results ==
=== Winter Olympics ===
Year	Place	Individual		Team	
Year	Place	Normal	Large	Super	Mixed
2026	(Italy) Milano Cortina	20	31	—	7

=== FIS Nordic World Ski Championships ===
Year	Place	Individual		Team	
Year	Place	Normal	Large	Men	Mixed
2025	(Norway) Trondheim	—	39	8	—

=== FIS Ski Flying World Championships ===
Year	Place	Individual	Team
2026	(Germany) Oberstdorf	q	9

=== FIS Nordic Junior World Ski Championships ===
Year	Place	Individual	Team NH	
Year	Place	NH	Men	Mixed
2021	(Canada) Whistler	39	10	—
2023	(Slovenia) Planica	23	6	—
2025	(United States) Lake Placid	9	3rd place, bronze medalist(s)	2nd place, silver medalist(s)

== World Cup ==
=== Standings ===
Season	Overall	4H	SF	RA	P7
2023–24	—	—	—	—	—
2024–25	56	—	—	39	42
2025–26	35	31	—	N/A	—
2026–27				N/A	

=== Individual starts (27) ===
winner (1); second (2); third (3); did not compete (–); failed to qualify (q); disqualified (DQ)
Season	1	2	3	4	5	6	7	8	9	10	11	12	13	14	15	16	17	18	19	20	21	22	23	24	25	26	27	28	29	30	31	32	Points
2023–24	Kuusamo	Kuusamo	Lillehammer	Lillehammer	Klingenthal	Klingenthal	Engelberg	Engelberg	Oberstdorf	Garmisch-Partenkirchen	Innsbruck	Bischofshofen	Wisła	Zakopane	Willingen	Willingen	Lake Placid	Lake Placid	Sapporo	Sapporo	Oberstdorf	Oberstdorf	Lahti	Lahti	Oslo	Oslo	Trondheim	Trondheim	Vikersund	Vikersund	Planica	Planica	0
2023–24	–	–	–	–	–	–	–	–	–	–	–	–	–	–	–	–	–	–	48	q	–	–	–	–	–	–	–	–	–	–	–	–	0
2024–25	Lillehammer	Lillehammer	Kuusamo	Kuusamo	Wisła	Wisła	Titisee-Neustadt	Titisee-Neustadt	Engelberg	Engelberg	Oberstdorf	Garmisch-Partenkirchen	Innsbruck	Bischofshofen	Zakopane	Oberstdorf	Oberstdorf	Willingen	Willingen	Lake Placid	Lake Placid	Sapporo	Sapporo	Oslo	Vikersund	Vikersund	Lahti	Planica	Planica				11
2024–25	–	–	28	40	–	–	–	–	–	–	–	–	–	–	–	–	–	–	–	DQ	45	–	–	29	q	40	25	q	–				11
2025–26	Lillehammer	Lillehammer	Falun	Falun	Ruka	Wisła	Wisła	Klingenthal	Klingenthal	Engelberg	Engelberg	Oberstdorf	Garmisch-Partenkirchen	Innsbruck	Bischofshofen	Zakopane	Sapporo	Sapporo	Willingen	Willingen	Bad Mitterndorf	Bad Mitterndorf	Lahti	Lahti	Oslo	Oslo	Vikersund	Planica	Planica				147
2025–26	21	26	36	23	q	19	22	24	41	7	46	19	31	9	34	37	–	–	19	24	38	q	58	q	–	–	–	–	–				147
2026–27	Lillehammer	Lillehammer	Ruka	Ruka	Wisła	Wisła	Titisee-Neustadt	Titisee-Neustadt	Engelberg	Engelberg	Oberstdorf	Garmisch-Partenkirchen	Innsbruck	Bischofshofen	Zakopane	Sapporo	Sapporo	Willingen	Willingen	Lake Placid	Lahti	Vikersund	Vikersund	Oslo	Oslo	Planica	Planica						0
2026–27	40																																0
