= Ski jumping at the 2026 Winter Olympics – Men's large hill super team =

Men's large hill super team at the XXV Olympic Winter Games
- Ski jumping
- Venue: Predazzo Ski Jumping Stadium, Predazzo
- Date: 16 February 2026
- Competitors: 34 from 17 nations
- Teams: 17
- Winning points: 568.7

Medalists
1st place, gold medalist(s)		Jan Hörl; Stephan Embacher	Austria
2nd place, silver medalist(s)		Paweł Wąsek; Kacper Tomasiak	Poland
3rd place, bronze medalist(s)		Johann André Forfang; Kristoffer Eriksen Sundal	Norway

The men's large hill super team competition of the 2026 Olympics was held on 16 February, at the Predazzo Ski Jumping Stadium in Predazzo. Compared to 2022, the format was changed: The teams now consisted of only two jumpers, who would compete in three rounds. Jan Hörl and Stephan Embacher of Austria won the event, while Paweł Wąsek and Kacper Tomasiak of Poland took the silver medal and Johann André Forfang and Kristoffer Eriksen Sundal of Norway won the bronze medal. The final round of the event was cancelled due to poor weather conditions, and results were taken from the conclusion of the 2nd round. For Embacher and Wąsek these were the first Olympic medals.

== Background ==
This is the first time the competition in the super team format took place at the Olympics. Previous editions featured the team event with four jumpers per country.

== Schedule ==
=== Competition ===
GMT	Date	Event	Round	Country	Winner	Distance
18:00 AM	16 February 2026	Trial round	TR			
19:00 AM	16 February 2026	1st round	1R			
19:45 PM	16 February 2026	2nd round	2R			
20:20 PM	16 February 2026	Final round	FR			

== Results ==
Rank	Bib	Country	Round 1			Round 2			Subtotal		Final round			Total
Rank	Bib	Country	Distance (m)	Points	Rank	Distance (m)	Points	Rank	Points	Rank	Distance (m)	Points	Rank	Points
1st place, gold medalist(s)	17; 17–1; 17–2	Austria; Jan Hörl; Stephan Embacher	137.5; 132.0	291.2; 151.8; 139.4	1	128.0; 139.0	277.5; 128.4; 149.1	1	568.7; 280.2; 288.5	1	Cancelled			568.7; 280.2; 288.5
2nd place, silver medalist(s)	12; 12–1; 12–2	Poland; Paweł Wąsek; Kacper Tomasiak	133.5; 135.5	274.5; 137.4; 137.1	3	129.5; 135.5	272.8; 131.7; 141.1	2	547.3; 269.1; 278.2	2	Cancelled			547.3; 269.1; 278.2
3rd place, bronze medalist(s)	13; 13–1; 13–2	Norway; Johann André Forfang; Kristoffer Eriksen Sundal	130.0; 134.0	267.9; 131.5; 136.4	6	129.5; 137.0	270.1; 132.2; 137.9	3	538.0; 263.7; 274.3	3	Cancelled			538.0; 263.7; 274.3
4	14; 14–1; 14–2	Germany; Andreas Wellinger; Philipp Raimund	127.5; 137.0	273.3; 130.4; 142.9	4	123.5; 137.5	264.4; 125.2; 139.2	5	537.7; 255.6; 282.1	4	Cancelled			537.7; 255.6; 282.1
5	16; 16–1; 16–2	Slovenia; Anže Lanišek; Domen Prevc	131.5; 134.0	280.9; 141.7; 139.2	2	124.5; 133.5	255.2; 116.9; 138.3	7	536.1; 258.6; 277.5	5	Cancelled			536.1; 258.6; 277.5
6	15; 15–1; 15–2	Japan; Ren Nikaidō; Ryōyū Kobayashi	131.5; 129.0	272.3; 137.4; 134.9	5	131.0; 130.0	262.9; 130.2; 132.7	6	535.2; 267.6; 267.6	6	Cancelled			535.2; 267.6; 267.6
7	10; 10–1; 10–2	Switzerland; Felix Trunz; Gregor Deschwanden	128.5; 136.5	267.5; 126.1; 141.4	7	128.0; 123.5	254.6; 126.3; 128.3	8	522.1; 252.4; 269.7	7	Cancelled			522.1; 252.4; 269.7
8	8; 8–1; 8–2	United States; Kevin Bickner; Tate Frantz	129.5; 131.5	255.5; 124.3; 131.2	10	133.0; 129.5	264.7; 134.2; 130.5	4	520.2; 258.5; 261.7	8	Cancelled			520.2; 258.5; 261.7
9	11; 11–1; 11–2	Finland; Antti Aalto; Niko Kytösaho	127.5; 137.5	258.9; 118.4; 140.5	8	131.5; 127.0	252.1; 126.5; 125.6	10	511.0; 244.9; 266.1	9	Did not advance			
10	7; 7–1; 7–2	Italy; Giovanni Bresadola; Alex Insam	131.0; 132.5	255.8; 127.0; 128.8	9	128.0; 126.0	254.3; 128.3; 126.0	9	510.1; 255.3; 254.8	10	Did not advance			
11	4; 4–1; 4–2	Kazakhstan; Danil Vassilyev; Ilya Mizernykh	130.5; 127.0	250.6; 128.2; 122.4	11	124.0; 122.5	231.8; 117.5; 114.3	12	482.4; 245.7; 236.7	11	Did not advance			
12	9; 9–1; 9–2	France; Jules Chervet; Valentin Foubert	121.5; 134.0	245.3; 107.0; 138.3	12	120.0; 120.0	232.3; 108.6; 123.7	11	477.6; 215.6; 262.0	12	Did not advance			
13	6; 6–1; 6–2	Estonia; Artti Aigro; Kaimar Vagul	127.5; 127.5	238.8; 120.5; 118.3	13	Did not advance								
14	5; 5–1; 5–2	Ukraine; Yevhen Marusiak; Vitaliy Kalinichenko	128.5; 114.0	208.1; 117.7; 90.4	14	Did not advance								
15	3; 3–1; 3–2	Turkey; Muhammed Ali Bedir; Fatih Arda İpcioğlu	114.0; 123.0	202.7; 99.7; 103.0	15	Did not advance								
16	2; 2–1; 2–2	China; Song Qiwu; Zhao Jiawen	117.5; 113.0	183.6; 95.1; 88.5	16	Did not advance								
17	1; 1–1; 1–2	Romania; Mihnea Spulber; Daniel Cacina	106.0; 117.5	182.1; 80.1; 102.0	17	Did not advance								
