= Nozomi Maruyama =

Japanese ski jumper (born 1998)

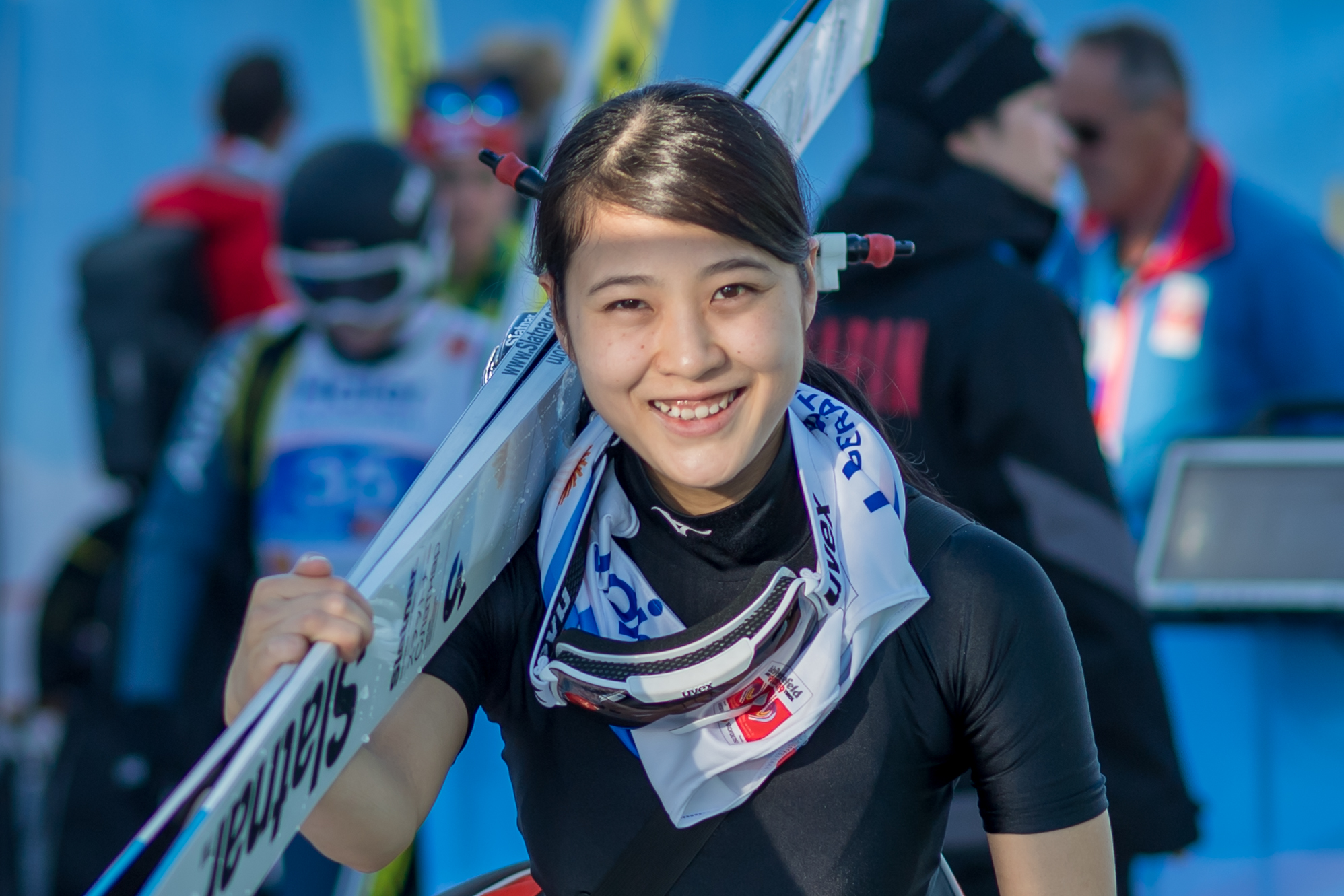

Personal information
- Born: 2 June 1998 (age 28) Nagano, Japan

Sport
- Sport: Skiing
- Club: Meiji-Universität

World Cup career
- Seasons: 2017–2021, 2023–present
- Indiv. starts: 123
- Indiv. podiums: 8
- Indiv. wins: 4
- Team starts: 8
- Team podiums: 2
- Team wins: 1

Achievements and titles
- Personal bests: 223.5 m (733 ft); Vikersund, 22 March 2026
Medal record
Women's ski jumping
Representing Japan
Olympic Games
Bronze medal – third place	2026 Milano Cortina	Individual NH
Bronze medal – third place	2026 Milano Cortina	Mixed team
- Updated on 22 March 2026

Nozomi Maruyama (Japanese: 丸山希, romanized: Maruyama Nozomi; born 2 June 1998) is a Japanese ski jumper. She is a two-time 2026 Winter Olympics bronze medalist in the mixed team and normal hill events.

== Career ==
Her debut in FIS Ski Jumping World Cup took place in 2018. As of December 2025, she has five wins in World Cup, all from the 2025–26 season five individual wins and one win with Japanese mixed team.

Maruyama won the bronze medal in the women's singles normal hill event at the 2026 Winter Olympics.

== World Cup ==
=== Standings ===
Season	Position	Points
2016–17	—	0
2017–18	—	0
2018–19	20	283
2019–20	13	355
2020–21	11	292
2022–23	12	574
2023–24	23	215
2024–25	18	325

=== Individual wins ===
No.	Season	Date	Location	Hill	Size
1	2025–26	22 November 2025	(Norway) Lillehammer	Lysgårdsbakken HS140	LH
2	2025–26	23 November 2025	(Norway) Lillehammer	Lysgårdsbakken HS140	LH
3	2025–26	28 November 2025	(Sweden) Falun	Lugnet HS95	NH
4	2025–26	12 December 2025	(Germany) Klingenthal	Vogtland Arena HS140	LH
5	2025–26	20 December 2025	(Switzerland) Engelberg	Gross-Titlis HS140	LH
6	2025–26	20 January 2025	(Japan) Zaō	Yamagata HS102	NH
