= Ski jumping at the 2015 European Youth Olympic Winter Festival =

Ski jumping at the 2015 European Youth Olympic Winter Festival was held 27–30 January 2015 at Montafon Nordic Sportszentrum in Tschagguns, Austria. There are four events contested in this edition which consisted of 2 boys' events and an event both for girls and mixed team.

== Medal summary ==
Event	Gold		Silver		Bronze	
Boys' individual	Niko Kytösaho (FIN)	271.3	Domen Prevc (SLO)	244.3	Dawid Jarząbek (POL)	242.9
Boys' team	Slovenia (SLO); Tine Bogataj; Bor Pavlovčič; Urban Rogelj; Domen Prevc	1030.4	Finland (FIN); Andreas Alamommo; Niko Löytäinen; Joni Markannen; Niko Kytösaho	1000.7	Austria (AUT); Julian Wienerroither; Michael Falkensteiner; Max Schmalnauer; Clemens Leitner	953.8
Girls' individual	Sofia Tikhonova (RUS)	227.1	Henriette Kraus (GER)	221.4	Agnes Reisch (GER) Luisa Görlich (GER)	219.6
Mixed team	Germany (GER); Agnes Reich; Jonathan Siegel; Henriette Kraus; Axel Mayländer	880.6	Russia (RUS); Mariia Iakovleva; Maksim Sergeev; Sofia Tikhonova; Kiril Kotik	870.6	Czech Republic (CZE); Jana Mrákotová; Robert Szymeczek; Zdena Pešatová; František Holík	843.2

== Medal table ==
Rank	Nation	Gold	Silver	Bronze	Total
1	Germany (GER)	1	1	2	4
2	Finland (FIN)	1	1	0	2
2	Russia (RUS)	1	1	0	2
2	Slovenia (SLO)	1	1	0	2
5	Austria (AUT)	0	0	1	1
5	Czech Republic (CZE)	0	0	1	1
5	Poland (POL)	0	0	1	1
Totals (7 entries)		4	4	5	13
