= Tomofumi Naito =

Japanese ski jumper (born 1993)

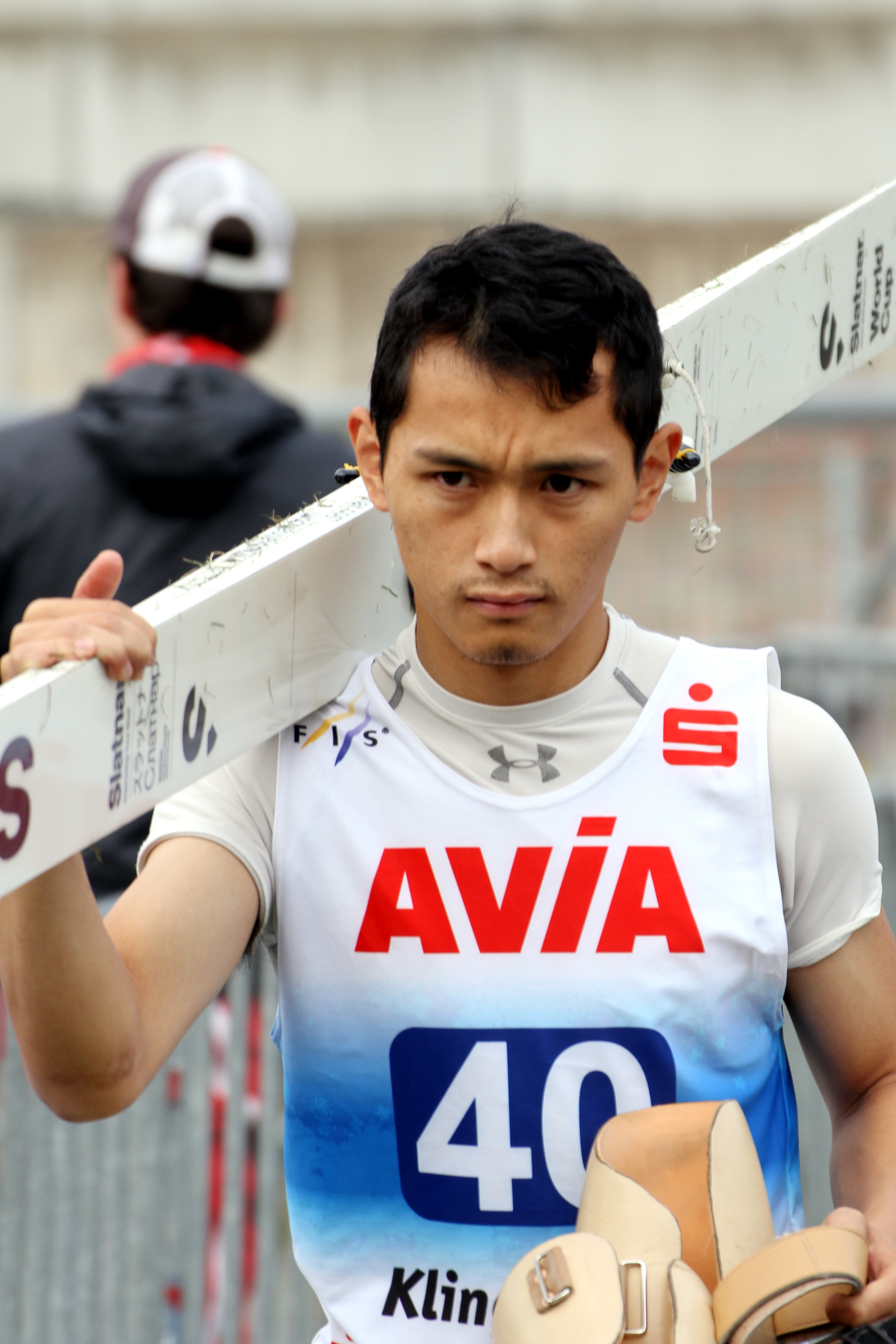
- Naito in 2017

Personal information
- Nationality: Japan
- Born: 22 February 1993 (age 33) Chōfu, Japan

Sport
- Sport: Ski jumping

World Cup career
- Seasons: 2018–present
- Indiv. starts: 41
- Indiv. podiums: 2
- Indiv. wins: 1
- Team starts: 2
- Team podiums: 1

Achievements and titles
- Personal bests: 242.5 m (796 ft); Kulm, 1 March 2026
Medal record
Men's ski flying
Representing Japan
Ski Flying World Championships
Gold medal – first place	2026 Oberstdorf	Team
- Updated on 29 March 2026

Tomofumi Naito (内藤智文, Naito Tomofumi; born 22 February 1993 in Chōfu) is a Japanese ski jumper.

== Career ==
Naito represented Japan at the FIS Ski Flying World Championships 2026 and won a gold medal in the team event. This was Japan's first medal in a FIS Ski Flying World Championships team event.

== Major Tournament results ==
=== Ski Flying World Championships ===
Year	Place	Individual	Team
2026	(Germany) Oberstdorf	19	1st place, gold medalist(s)

== World Cup results ==
=== Standings ===
Season	Overall	4H	SF	RA	W6	T5	P7
2017/18	—	—	—	—	—	N/A	—
2018/19	—	—	—	—	—	N/A	—
2019/20	did not participate						
2020/21	did not participate						
2021/22	did not participate						
2022/23	—	—	—	—	N/A	N/A	—
2023/24	—	—	—	—	N/A	N/A	—
2024/25	—	—	—	—	N/A	N/A	—
2025/26	21	50	7	N/A	N/A	N/A	14

=== Individual wins ===
No.	Season	Date	Location	Hill	Size
1	2025–26	15 March 2026	(Norway) Oslo	Holmenkollbakken HS134	LH

=== Individual starts (41) ===
winner (1); second (2); third (3); did not compete (–); failed to qualify (q); disqualified (DQ); did not start (DNS)
Season	1	2	3	4	5	6	7	8	9	10	11	12	13	14	15	16	17	18	19	20	21	22	23	24	25	26	27	28	29	30	31	32	Points
2017/18	Wisła	Kuusamo	Nizhny Tagil	Nizhny Tagil	Titisee-Neustadt	Engelberg	Engelberg	Oberstdorf	Garmisch-Partenkirchen	Innsbruck	Bischofshofen	Tauplitz	Zakopane	Willingen	Willingen	Lahti	Oslo	Lillehammer	Trondheim	Vikersund	Planica	Planica											0
2017/18	–	–	–	–	–	–	–	–	–	–	–	–	–	q	55	–	–	–	–	–	–	–											0
2018/19	Wisła	Kuusamo	Kuusamo	Nizhny Tagil	Nizhny Tagil	Engelberg	Engelberg	Oberstdorf	Garmisch-Partenkirchen	Innsbruck	Bischofshofen	Val di Fiemme	Val di Fiemme	Zakopane	Sapporo	Sapporo	Oberstdorf	Oberstdorf	Oberstdorf	Lahti	Willingen	Willingen	Oslo	Lillehammer	Trondheim	Vikersund	Planica	Planica					0
2018/19	–	–	–	–	–	–	–	–	–	–	–	–	–	–	45	DQ	–	–	–	–	–	–	–	–	–	–	–	–					0
2022/23	Wisła	Wisła	Ruka	Ruka	Titisee-Neustadt	Titisee-Neustadt	Engelberg	Engelberg	Oberstdorf	Garmisch-Partenkirchen	Innsbruck	Bischofshofen	Zakopane	Sapporo	Sapporo	Sapporo	Tauplitz	Tauplitz	Willingen	Willingen	Lake Placid	Lake Placid	Râșnov	Oslo	Oslo	Lillehammer	Lillehammer	Vikersund	Vikersund	Lahti	Planica	Planica	0
2022/23	–	–	–	–	–	–	–	–	–	–	–	–	–	44	51	–	–	–	–	–	–	–	–	–	–	–	–	–	–	–	–	–	0
2023/24	Kuusamo	Kuusamo	Lillehammer	Lillehammer	Klingenthal	Klingenthal	Engelberg	Engelberg	Oberstdorf	Garmisch-Partenkirchen	Innsbruck	Bischofshofen	Wisła	Zakopane	Willingen	Willingen	Lake Placid	Lake Placid	Sapporo	Sapporo	Oberstdorf	Oberstdorf	Lahti	Lahti	Oslo	Oslo	Trondheim	Trondheim	Vikersund	Vikersund	Planica	Planica	0
2023/24	37	47	45	38	38	36	q	q	–	–	–	–	–	–	–	–	–	–	–	q	–	–	–	–	–	–	–	–	–	–	–	–	0
2024/25	Lillehammer	Lillehammer	Ruka	Ruka	Wisła	Wisła	Titisee-Neustadt	Titisee-Neustadt	Engelberg	Engelberg	Oberstdorf	Garmisch-Partenkirchen	Innsbruck	Bischofshofen	Zakopane	Oberstdorf	Oberstdorf	Willingen	Willingen	Lake Placid	Lake Placid	Sapporo	Sapporo	Oslo	Vikersund	Vikersund	Lahti	Planica	Planica				0
2024/25	–	–	–	–	–	–	–	–	–	–	47	DQ	q	41	–	–	–	–	–	–	–	33	32	–	–	–	–	–	–				0
2025/26	Lillehammer	Lillehammer	Falun	Falun	Ruka	Wisła	Wisła	Klingenthal	Klingenthal	Engelberg	Engelberg	Oberstdorf	Garmisch-Partenkirchen	Innsbruck	Bischofshofen	Zakopane	Sapporo	Sapporo	Willingen	Willingen	Bad Mitterndorf	Bad Mitterndorf	Lahti	Lahti	Oslo	Oslo	Vikersund	Planica	Planica				401
2025/26	31	30	40	22	44	33	29	42	6	27	45	35	q	–	25	40	22	17	11	19	DNS	4	29	36	18	1	2	18	12				401
