= Kristoffer Eriksen Sundal =

Norwegian ski jumper (born 2001)

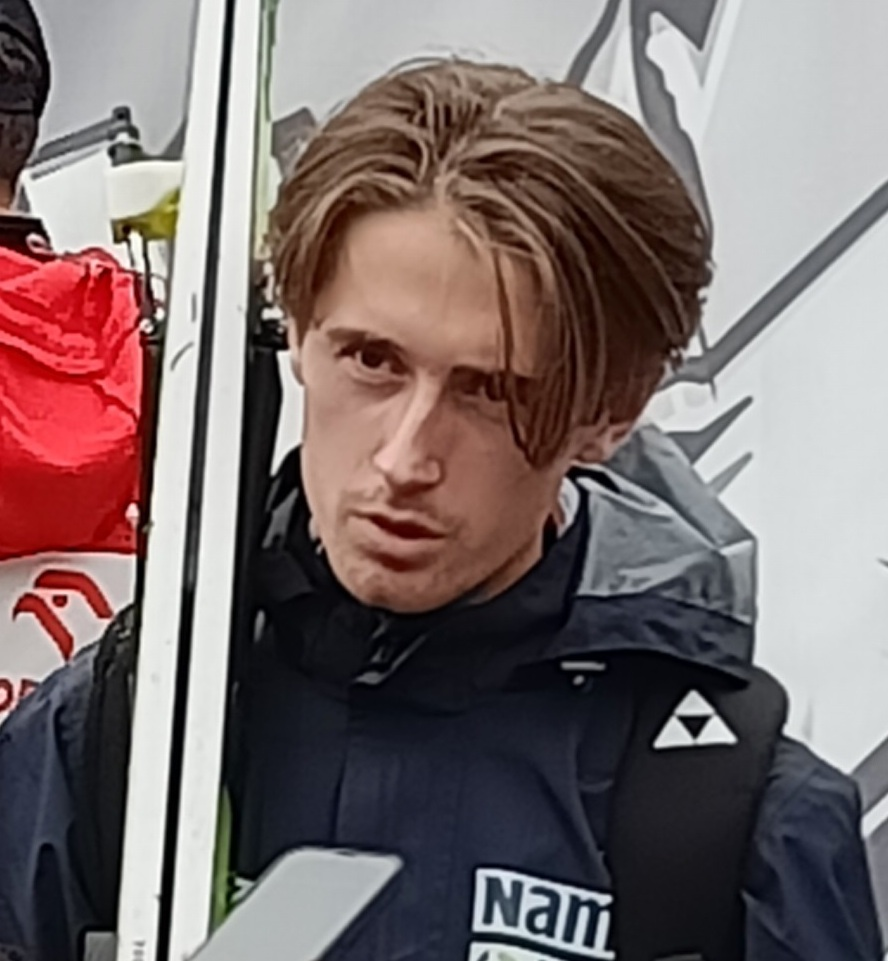

Medal record

Men's ski jumping

Representing Norway

Olympic Games
Silver medal – second place	2026 Milano Cortina	Mixed team
Bronze medal – third place	2026 Milano Cortina	Super team LH

World Championships
Bronze medal – third place	2025 Trondheim	Team LH

Men's ski flying

World Championships
Bronze medal – third place	2026 Oberstdorf	Team

Kristoffer Eriksen Sundal (born 7 February 2001) is a ski jumper from Norway. At the 2026 Winter Olympics, he won a silver medal in the mixed team and a bronze medal in the men's super team.

== Career ==
Eriksen Sundal's debut in the FIS Ski Jumping World Cup took place in November 2022 in Wisła. As of 2025, he has 8 podiums in the World Cup, including four individual podiums and a win with the Norwegian team. He also finished 2nd at the Men's team large hill event at the FIS Nordic World Ski Championships 2023.

Following the disqualification of Norwegian ski jumpers Johann André Forfang and Marius Lindvik at the men's large hill event due to ski-jumping suits manipulations, Robin Pedersen, Kristoffer Eriksen Sundal, and Robert Johansson also got temporary suspensions from competitions from FIS.
