= Stephan Embacher =

Austrian ski jumper (born 2006)

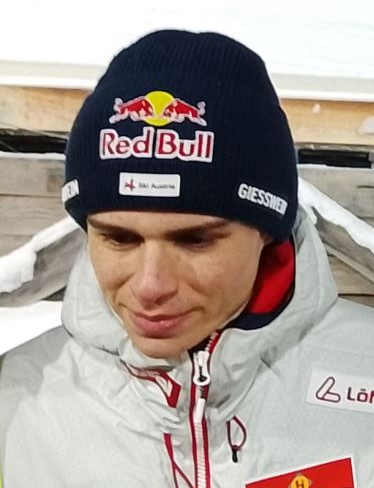
- Stephan Embacher in competition (2025)

Personal information
- Nationality: Austria
- Born: January 12, 2006 (age 20) St. Johann in Tirol, Austria

Sport
- Sport: Skiing
- Club: Kitzbüheler SC

World Cup career
- Seasons: 2024–present
- Indiv. podiums: 7
- Indiv. wins: 2

Achievements and titles
- Personal bests: 240.5 m (789 ft); Kulm, 1 March 2026
Medal record
Men's ski jumping
Representing Austria
Olympic Games
Gold medal – first place	2026 Milano Cortina	Super team LH
Junior World Championships
Gold medal – first place	2023 Whistler	Team NH
Gold medal – first place	2024 Planica	Individual NH
Gold medal – first place	2024 Planica	Team NH
Gold medal – first place	2024 Planica	Mixed team NH
Gold medal – first place	2025 Lake Placid	Individual NH
Gold medal – first place	2025 Lake Placid	Team NH
Gold medal – first place	2026 Lillehammer	Individual NH
Bronze medal – third place	2025 Lake Placid	Mixed team NH
Men's ski flying
World Championships
Silver medal – second place	2026 Oberstdorf	Team
- Updated on February 2026

Stephan Embacher (born 12 January 2006) is an Austrian ski jumper who competes in the World Cup. He is considered one of the most promising young athletes in the sport, having won multiple titles at the Nordic Junior World Ski Championships and achieving a World Cup podium early in his senior career. At the 2026 Winter Olympics, he won a gold medal in the men's super team.

== Early life ==
Embacher was born in Hopfgarten im Brixental, in the Austrian state of Tyrol. He began ski jumping at a young age and later attended the prestigious Schigymnasium Stams, a major development center for Austrian winter athletes. He represents the Kitzbüheler SC.

== Career ==
=== Junior career ===
Embacher enjoyed significant success at junior level. At the 2024 Nordic Junior World Ski Championships in Planica, he won the gold medal on the normal hill. He successfully defended his title at the 2025 Nordic Junior World Ski Championships in Lake Placid, becoming one of the few athletes to win consecutive junior world titles.

He also earned medals in the team and mixed team events at the junior world championships.

=== World Cup ===
Embacher made his FIS Ski Jumping World Cup debut on 3 January 2024 at the Four Hills stop in Innsbruck, scoring points in his first career World Cup event.

On 26 November 2025, he achieved his first World Cup podium with a second-place finish in Falun.

During the Four Hills Tournament 2025–26 edition, he set a new hill qualification record at Große Olympiaschanze in Garmisch-Partenkirchen with a 145.5 m jump.

=== Olympics ===
At the 2026 Winter Olympics, Embacher won the gold medal in men's large hill super team for Austria.

== Style and reputation ==
Embacher is noted for his strong takeoff mechanics, balanced flight position, and consistency across variable wind conditions. His early results have established him as one of Austria's most promising young jumpers.

== World Cup results ==
=== Standings ===
Season	Overall	4H	SF	RA
2023/24	39	—	—	—
2024/25	42	31	—	32
2025/26	6	3rd place, bronze medalist(s)	2nd place, silver medalist(s)	N/A

=== Individual wins ===
No.	Season	Date	Location	Hill	Size
1	2025–26	21 March 2026	(Norway) Vikersund	Vikersundbakken HS240	FH
2	2026/27	21 November 2026	(Norway) Lillehammer	Lysgardsbakken HS140	LH
