= Jan Hörl =

Austrian ski jumper (born 1998)

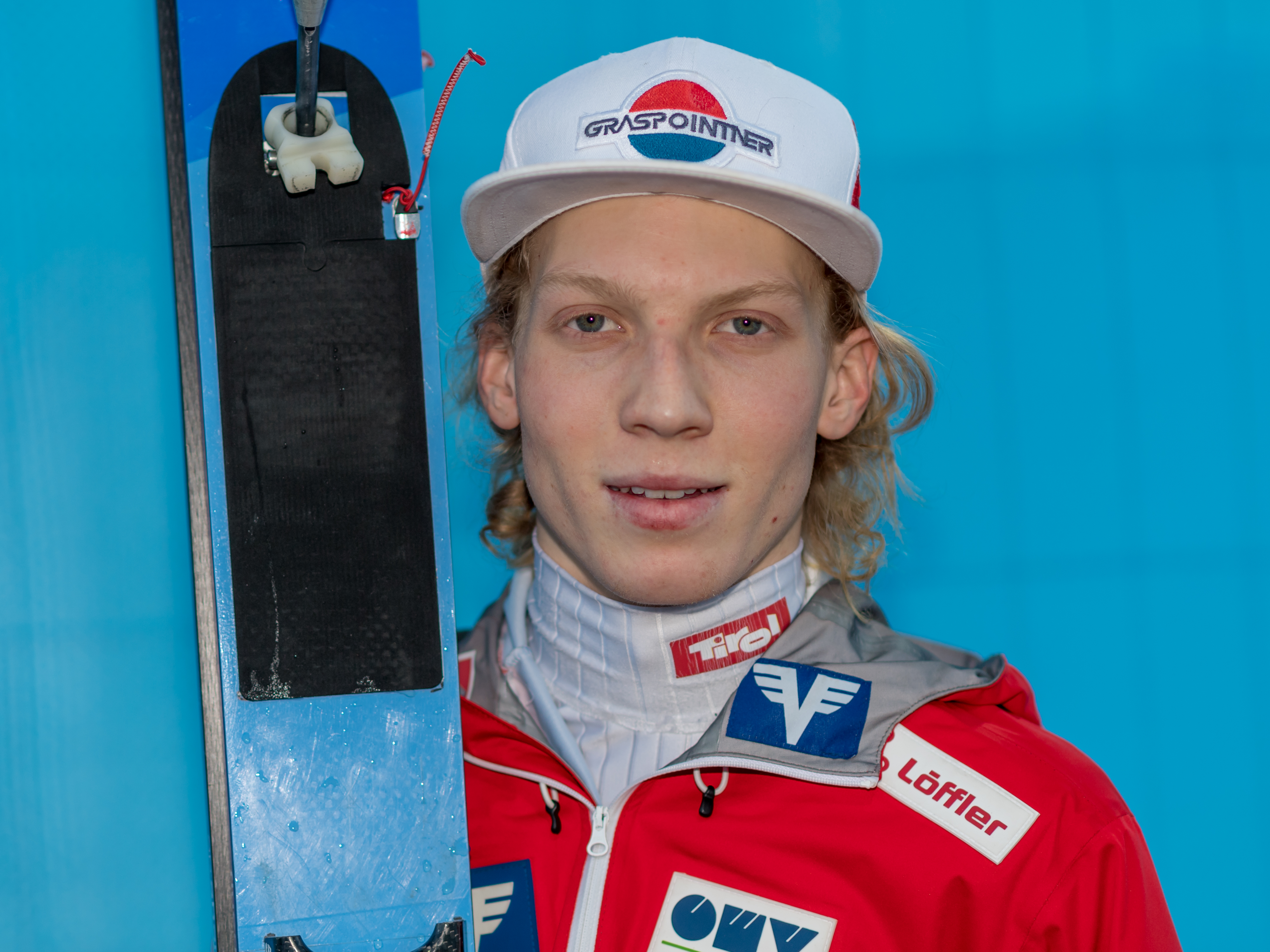
- Hörl in 2019

Personal information
- Nationality: Austria
- Born: 16 October 1998 (age 27) Schwarzach im Pongau, Austria
- Height: 1.75 m (5 ft 9 in)

Sport
- Sport: Skiing
- Club: SC Bischofshofen

World Cup career
- Seasons: 2019–present
- Indiv. starts: 156
- Indiv. podiums: 25
- Indiv. wins: 5
- Team starts: 19
- Team podiums: 18
- Team wins: 10

Achievements and titles
- Personal bests: 242.5 m (796 ft); Planica, 30 March 2025
Medal record
Representing Austria
Men's ski jumping
Olympic Games
Gold medal – first place	2022 Beijing	Team LH
Gold medal – first place	2026 Milano Cortina	Super team LH
World Championships
Silver medal – second place	2021 Oberstdorf	Team LH
Silver medal – second place	2025 Trondheim	Individual LH
Silver medal – second place	2025 Trondheim	Team LH
Bronze medal – third place	2023 Planica	Team LH
Bronze medal – third place	2025 Trondheim	Individual NH
Bronze medal – third place	2025 Trondheim	Mixed team LH
European Games
Gold medal – first place	2023 Kraków–Małopolska	Mixed team NH
Silver medal – second place	2023 Kraków–Małopolska	Individual NH
Silver medal – second place	2023 Kraków–Małopolska	Individual LH
Junior World Championships
Silver medal – second place	2018 Kandersteg	Team NH
Bronze medal – third place	2018 Kandersteg	Mixed team NH
Men's ski flying
World Championships
Silver medal – second place	2024 Bad Mitterndorf	Team
Silver medal – second place	2026 Oberstdorf	Team
- Updated on 16 February 2026

Jan Hörl (born 16 October 1998) is an Austrian ski jumper and a two-time Olympic champion.

== Career ==
Hörl's FIS Ski Jumping World Cup debut took place in Innsbruck on 4 January 2019 where he finished 29th. On 5 December 2021 he won his first individual World Cup competition in Wisła, Poland. On 14 February 2022 he achieved his biggest success when Jan Hörl, together with Stefan Kraft, Daniel Huber and Manuel Fettner, won the team competition gold medal in Beijing 2022.

His best season so far has been the 2021-22 FIS Ski Jumping World Cup, where he finished 9th in the overall with 662 points and achieved his first individual World Cup win in Wisła and finished 3rd on the Paul-Ausserleitner-Schanze in his hometown Bischofshofen. Hörl won three team events this season in Wisła, Bischofshofen and Lahti.

== World Cup ==
=== Season standings ===
Season	Overall	4H	SF	RA
2018/19	43	45	—	49
2019/20	27	25	—	—
2020/21	39	33	35	—
2021/22	9	8	28	13
2022/23	13	9	6	13
2023/24	4	—	28	17
2024/25	2nd place, silver medalist(s)	2nd place, silver medalist(s)	7	5

=== Wins ===
No.	Season	Date	Location	Hill	Size
1	2021/22	5 December 2021	(Poland) Wisła	Malinka HS134	LH
2	2023/24	3 January 2024	(Austria) Innsbruck	Bergiselschanze HS128	LH
3	2023/24	3 March 2024	(Finland) Lahti	Salpausselkä HS130	LH
4	2024/25	24 November 2024	(Norway) Lillehammer	Lysgårdsbakken HS140	LH
5	2024/25	21 December 2024	(Switzerland) Engelberg	Gross-Titlis HS140	LH
