= Niko Kytösaho =

Finnish ski jumper (born 1999)

Personal information
- Nationality: Finland
- Born: 18 December 1999 (age 26) Paimio, Finland

Sport
- Sport: Skiing
- Club: Paimion Urheilijat

Niko Oskari Kytösaho (born 18 December 1999) is a Finnish ski jumper.

== Career ==
He won the gold medal in the normal hill and a silver medal in the team competition at the 2015 European Youth Olympic Festival. At the Junior World Championships he competed in 2016, 2017 and 2019. His best placement was 6th in the team competition in 2017.

He is coached by his brother Eetu. After the EYOF gold he was supposed to attend a sports high school in Stams, but was instead hospitalized and diagnosed with type 1 diabetes.

Kytösaho made his Continental Cup debut in December 2014 in Rena, Norway, followed by his World Cup debut in February 2016 in Lahti. He would collect his first World Cup points much later, in November 2019 in Ruka, where he finished 21st. His first individual top 10 was a 9th place from February 2024 in Willingen, followed by a 7th place in March 2024 in Oslo and 8th in November 2025 in Ruka.

Kytösaho's 5th place at the February 2026 World Cup event in Willingen was the best Finnish result in twelve years. He followed with another 5th place in March 2026 in Oslo.

At the Ski Flying World Championships, Kytösaho has competed in 2020, 2022, 2024 and 2026. His best individual finish is 7th from 2024, having also finished 5th with the team in 2026.

At the World Championships, Kytösaho has competed in 2021, 2023 and 2025. His best individual placements were 26th in the normal hill in 2021, 27th in the normal hill in 2023, and 28th in the large hill in 2023. In mixed team his best placement was 6th in 2023 and in the men's team his best placement was 7th in 2025.

Kytösaho missed the 2022 Winter Olympics due to a positive COVID-19 test. At the 2026 Winter Olympics, Kytösaho finished 18th in the large hill, 24th in the normal hill, 6th in the mixed team and 9th in the super team.
