= Ren Nikaidō =

Japanese ski jumper (born 2001)

Personal information
- Nationality: Japan
- Born: 24 May 2001 (age 25) Ebetsu, Japan
- Height: 1.66 m (5 ft 5 in)

Sport
- Sport: Skiing
- Club: NIPPON BEER

World Cup career
- Seasons: 2019–present
- Indiv. starts: 107
- Indiv. podiums: 8
- Indiv. wins: 1
- Team starts: 17
- Team podiums: 4
- Team wins: 1

Achievements and titles
- Personal bests: 237 m (778 ft); Vikersund, 21 March 2026
Medal record
Men's ski jumping
Representing Japan
Olympic Games
Silver medal – second place	2026 Milano Cortina	Individual LH
Bronze medal – third place	2026 Milano Cortina	Individual NH
Bronze medal – third place	2026 Milano Cortina	Mixed team
Men's ski flying
Representing Japan
Ski Flying World Championships
Gold medal – first place	2026 Oberstdorf	Team
Bronze medal – third place	2026 Oberstdorf	Individual
- Updated on 29 March 2026

Ren Nikaidō (二階堂 蓮, Nikaidō Ren; born 24 May 2001) is a Japanese ski jumper. He won three medals in ski jumping at the 2026 Winter Olympics.

== Major Tournament results ==
=== Winter Olympics ===
Year	Place	NH	LH	Team LH	Mixed NH
2026	(Italy) Milano-Cortina	3rd place, bronze medalist(s)	2nd place, silver medalist(s)	6	3rd place, bronze medalist(s)

=== FIS World Nordic Ski Championships ===
Year	Place	NH	LH	Team LH	Mixed NH
2023	(Slovenia) Planica	43	32	7	—
2025	(Norway) Trondheim	22	42	5	5

=== Ski Flying World Championships ===
Year	Place	Individual	Team
2024	(Austria) Bad Mitterndorf	30	5
2026	(Germany) Oberstdorf	3rd place, bronze medalist(s)	1st place, gold medalist(s)

== World Cup results ==
=== Standings ===
Season	Overall	4H	SF	RA	W6	T5	P7
2019/20	—	—	—	—	—	N/A	N/A
2020/21	did not participate						
2021/22	did not participate						
2022/23	43	47	—	57	N/A	N/A	—
2023/24	22	—	21	13	N/A	N/A	21
2024/25	19	27	18	18	N/A	N/A	15
2025/26	4	4	12	N/A	N/A	N/A	5

=== Wins ===
No.	Season	Date	Location	Hill	Size
1	2025/26	4 January 2026	(Austria) Innsbruck	Bergiselschanze HS128 (night)	LH

=== Individual starts (107) ===
Season	1	2	3	4	5	6	7	8	9	10	11	12	13	14	15	16	17	18	19	20	21	22	23	24	25	26	27	28	29	30	31	32	Points
2019/20	Wisła	Kuusamo	Nizhny Tagil	Nizhny Tagil	Klingenthal	Engelberg	Engelberg	Oberstdorf	Garmisch-Partenkirchen	Innsbruck	Bischofshofen	Val di Fiemme	Val di Fiemme	Titisee-Neustadt	Titisee-Neustadt	Zakopane	Sapporo	Sapporo	Willingen	Tauplitz	Tauplitz	Râșnov	Râșnov	Lahti	Lahti	Oslo	Lillehammer						0
2019/20	–	–	–	–	–	–	–	–	–	–	–	–	–	–	–	–	35	46	–	–	–	–	–	–	–	–	–						0
2022/23	Wisła	Wisła	Ruka	Ruka	Titisee-Neustadt	Titisee-Neustadt	Engelberg	Engelberg	Oberstdorf	Garmisch-Partenkirchen	Innsbruck	Bischofshofen	Zakopane	Sapporo	Sapporo	Sapporo	Tauplitz	Tauplitz	Willingen	Willingen	Lake Placid	Lake Placid	Râșnov	Oslo	Oslo	Lillehammer	Lillehammer	Vikersund	Vikersund	Lahti	Planica	Planica	49
2022/23	28	38	42	q	45	44	48	47	q	41	49	37	–	32	30	14	35	q	47	27	32	17	–	24	29	–	–	–	–	–	–	–	49
2023/24	Kuusamo	Kuusamo	Lillehammer	Lillehammer	Klingenthal	Klingenthal	Engelberg	Engelberg	Oberstdorf	Garmisch-Partenkirchen	Innsbruck	Bischofshofen	Wisła	Zakopane	Willingen	Willingen	Lake Placid	Lake Placid	Sapporo	Sapporo	Oberstdorf	Oberstdorf	Lahti	Lahti	Oslo	Oslo	Trondheim	Trondheim	Vikersund	Vikersund	Planica	Planica	449
2023/24	27	41	40	30	21	19	17	18	16	19	12	13	12	10	22	10	20	8	24	7	13	13	25	25	13	9	16	20	18	36	26	19	449
2024/25	Lillehammer	Lillehammer	Ruka	Ruka	Wisła	Wisła	Titisee-Neustadt	Titisee-Neustadt	Engelberg	Engelberg	Oberstdorf	Garmisch-Partenkirchen	Innsbruck	Bischofshofen	Zakopane	Oberstdorf	Oberstdorf	Willingen	Willingen	Lake Placid	Lake Placid	Sapporo	Sapporo	Oslo	Vikersund	Vikersund	Lahti	Planica	Planica				444
2024/25	25	39	14	8	10	6	36	18	19	24	23	13	–	10	16	24	25	30	23	8	10	9	14	15	21	17	13	13	17				444
2025/26	Lillehammer	Lillehammer	Falun	Falun	Ruka	Wisła	Wisła	Klingenthal	Klingenthal	Engelberg	Engelberg	Oberstdorf	Garmisch-Partenkirchen	Innsbruck	Bischofshofen	Zakopane	Sapporo	Sapporo	Willingen	Willingen	Bad Mitterndorf	Bad Mitterndorf	Lahti	Lahti	Oslo	Oslo	Vikersund	Planica	Planica				1109
2025/26	20	10	11	8	2	13	4	4	2	3	10	13	4	1	8	–	3	6	2	2	DNS	DNS	DNS	14	5	18	14	2	17				1109
