= FIS Ski Flying World Championships 2026 =

Ski flying event in Oberstdorf, Germany

- Host city: Oberstdorf
- Nations: Germany
- Sport: Ski flying
- Events: 2
- Opening: 22 January
- Closing: 25 January
- Main venue: Heini-Klopfer-Skiflugschanze HS235

The 2026 FIS Ski Flying World Championships were the 29th Ski Flying World Championships, which took place from 22 to 25 January 2026 in Oberstdorf, Germany.

== Schedule ==
All times are local (UTC+1).

Date	Time	Events
22 January	17:00	Qualification
23 January	16:00	Round 1–2
24 January	16:30	Round 3–4
25 January	16:15	Team

== Medal summary ==
=== Medal table ===
* Host nation (Germany)

Rank	Nation	Gold	Silver	Bronze	Total
1	Japan	1	0	1	2
2	Slovenia	1	0	0	1
3	Norway	0	1	1	2
4	Austria	0	1	0	1
Totals (4 entries)		2	2	2	6

=== Medalists ===
Event	Gold		Silver		Bronze	
Individual	Domen Prevc; Slovenia	905.4	Marius Lindvik; Norway	845.9	Ren Nikaido; Japan	842.4
Team	Japan; Ryōyū Kobayashi; Tomofumi Naito; Naoki Nakamura; Ren Nikaido	1,569.9	Austria; Stephan Embacher; Stefan Kraft; Manuel Fettner; Jan Hörl	1,560.0	Norway; Johann André Forfang; Kristoffer Eriksen Sundal; Benjamin Oestvold; Marius Lindvik	1,483.7
