= Baiqi =

Baiqi may refer to:

== Places ==
- Baiqi (白旗镇), town in Shulan, Jilin, China
- Baiqi (白旗镇), town in Fengcheng, Liaoning, China
- Baiqi (白旗乡), township in Chongli District, Zhangjiakou, Hebei, China
- Baiqi Hui Ethnic Township (百崎回族乡), Hui'an County, Fujian, China

== People ==
- Bai Qi (died 257 BC), military general of Qin state during the Warring States period of China
