= Sitaizui Township =

Sitaizui Township 四台嘴乡
- Township
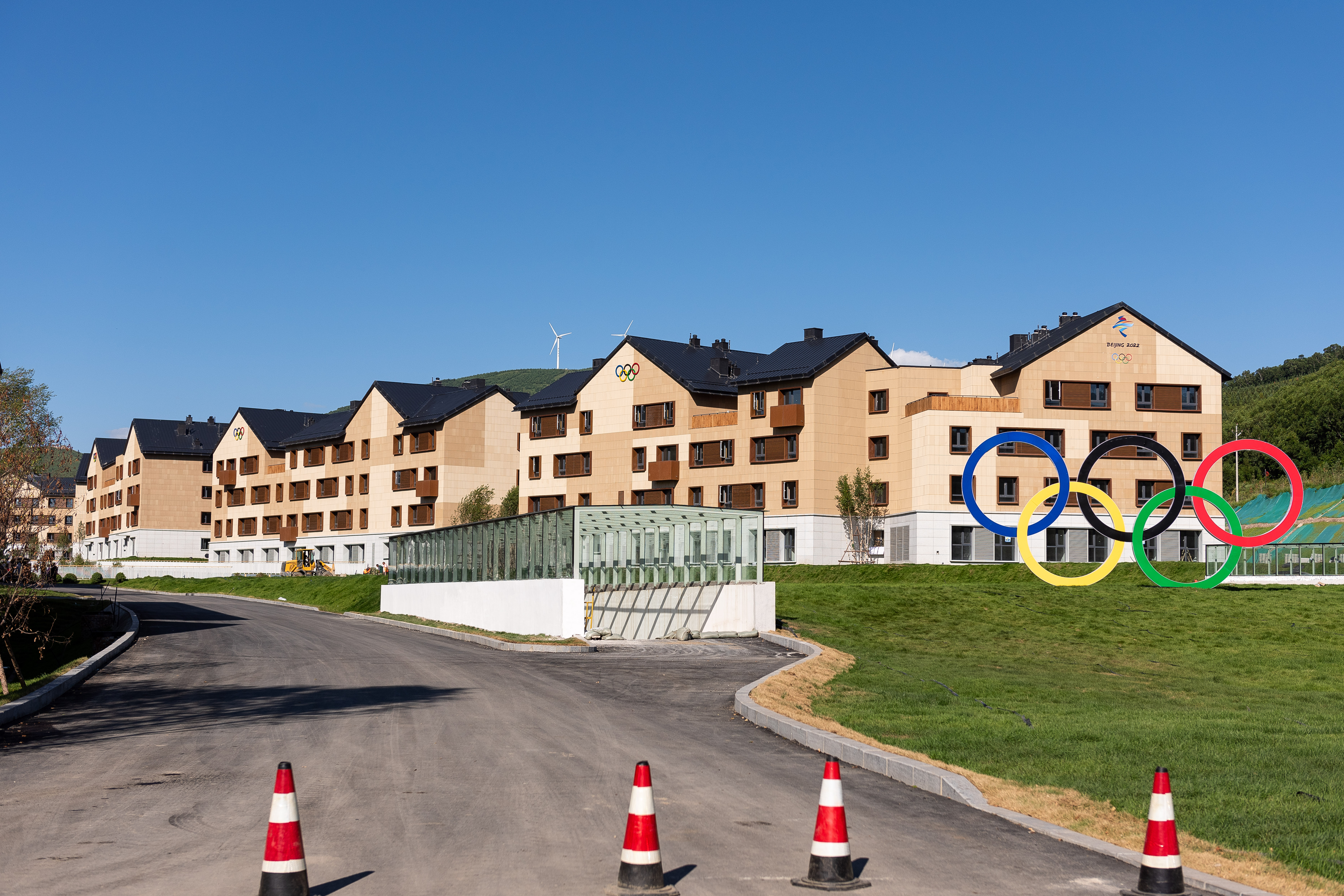
- The Olympic Village in Taizicheng

- Location within China Location within Hebei
- Coordinates: 40°48′25″N 115°20′44″E
- Country: China
- Province: Hebei
- Prefecture-level city: Zhangjiakou
- District: Chongli District

Area
  - Total: 374.88 km^{2} (144.74 sq mi)

Population (2019)
  - Total: 13,942
  - Density: 37.191/km^{2} (96.323/sq mi)

Sitaizui Township (simplified Chinese: 四台嘴乡; traditional Chinese: 四台嘴鄉; pinyin: Sìtáizuǐ Xiāng) is a township in Chongli District, Zhangjiakou, Hebei, China. Sitaizui Township spans an area of 374.88 square kilometres (144.74 mi^{2}), and has a population of 13,942, according to a 2020 government publication. The township is home to the village of Taizicheng, which served as a venue for a number skiing events in the 2022 Winter Olympics.

== Geography ==
Sitaizui Township is located in the southeast portion of Chongli District. The township is bordered by Chicheng County to the east, Xuanhua District to the south, the town of Gaojiaying within Chongli District to the west, and the town of Xiwanzi within Chongli District to the north.

The township's physical geography is characterized by its fairly mountainous terrain, which has an average altitude of 1,569 metres (5,148 ft) above sea level. The majority of Sitaizui Township's area is forested.

== Administrative divisions ==
Sitaizui Township governs the following 31 village-level divisions:

- Sitaizui Village (Chinese: 四台嘴村)
- Majugou Village (Chinese: 马驹沟村)
- Changgouzi Village (Chinese: 常沟子村)
- Jiucaiping Village (Chinese: 韭菜坪村)
- Hualinzi Village (Chinese: 桦林子村)
- Xingrenmagou Village (Chinese: 行人马沟村)
- Heyanggou Village (Chinese: 河阳沟村)
- Xinzhangzi Village (Chinese: 辛丈子村)
- Gouzhang Village (Chinese: 沟掌村)
- Goumen Village (Chinese: 沟门村)
- Huangtuyao Village (Chinese: 黄土窑村)
- Lujiawan Village (Chinese: 逯家湾村)
- Wangzigou Village (Chinese: 王子沟村)
- Guzuizi Village (Chinese: 谷嘴子村)
- Qian'erdaogou Village (Chinese: 前二道沟村)
- Heitugou Village (Chinese: 黑土沟村)
- Dasonggoumen Village (Chinese: 大松沟门村)
- Erdaoying Village (Chinese: 二道营村)
- Sandaoying Village (Chinese: 三道营村)
- Zhuanwagou Village (Chinese: 砖瓦沟村)
- Mazhangzi Village (Chinese: 马丈子村)
- Xiping Village (Chinese: 西坪村)
- Dongping Village (Chinese: 东坪村)
- Yaoziwan Village (Chinese: 窑子湾村)
- Shuiquanzi Village (Chinese: 水泉子村)
- Zhuanzhilian Village (Chinese: 转枝连村)
- Taizicheng Village (Chinese: 太子城村)
- Yingcha Village (Chinese: 营岔村)
- Kuyangshu Village (Chinese: 枯杨树村)
- Qipanliang Village (Chinese: 棋盘梁村)
- Laohugou Village (Chinese: 老虎沟村)
- Dongping Industrial and Mining Area (Chinese: 东坪工矿区)

== Demographics ==
A 2020 government publication stated that Sitaizui Township is home to 13,942 people, who comprise 5,238 different households.

== Economy ==
The township's economy is largely based on vegetable growing, and skiing-related tourism. Tourism relating to other outdoor activities, such as hiking, mountain climbing, and cycling has grown in recent years. Sitaizui Township used to host a number of mines, however, the local government has encouraged a shift towards agriculture.

== See also ==
- 2022 Winter Olympics
- Taizicheng
