= Taizicheng =

Taizicheng 太子城村
- Village
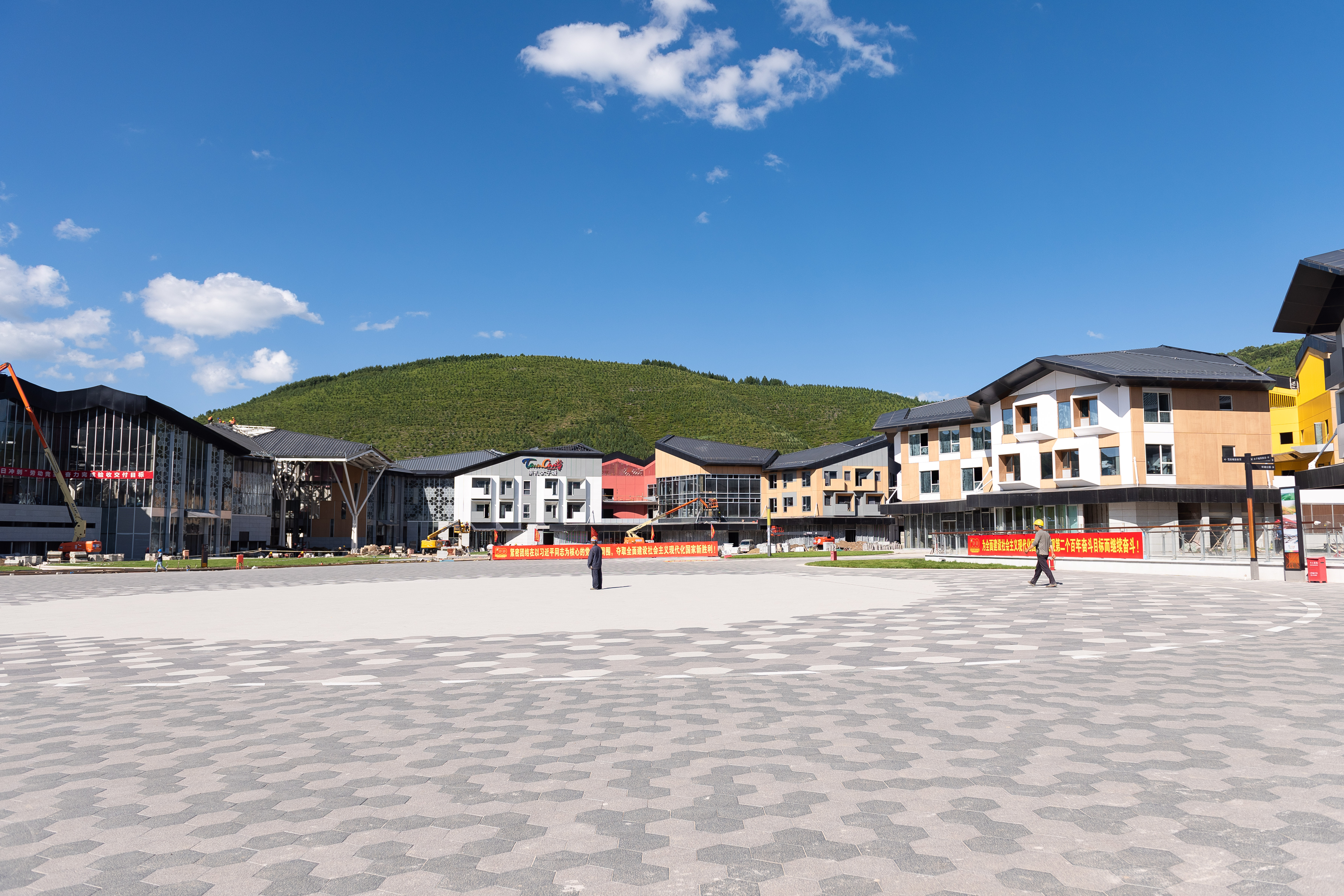
- Taizicheng Ice and Snow Town

- Location in Hebei
- Coordinates: 40°55′21″N 115°26′50″E
- Country: People's Republic of China
- Province: Hebei
- Prefecture-level city: Zhangjiakou
- District: Chongli
- Township: Sitaizui Township

Area
  - Total: 6.4 km^{2} (2.5 sq mi)
- Time zone: UTC+8 (China Standard)

Taizicheng (Chinese: 太子城; pinyin: Tàizǐchéng) is a village in Sitaizui (四台嘴乡), Chongli District of Zhangjiakou in the northwest of Hebei Province, China. Its name means "City of the Crown Prince", and archaeological excavations carried out between May and November 2017 uncovered the remains of an imperial palace of the Jin dynasty (1115–1234). It is thought that this was the summer palace for Emperor Zhangzong of Jin (r. 1189–1208), which is named Tai He Palace in the History of Jin.

== Imperial palace ==
In preparation for developing the Taizicheng area as a skiing venue for the 2022 Winter Olympic Games, an archaeological survey of the entire village (covering 6,400 square meters), and excavations of sites of interest, were carried out from May to November 2017. The main discovery was a rectangular walled settlement, about 400 metres in length (from north to south) and about 350 metres in width (from east to west), covering 140,000 square metres. The settlement included a network of roads centred on a T-shaped main thoroughfare. 28 buildings were identified within the settlement, the largest of which was located 75 m north of the south gate, and comprised fifteen rooms.

Building materials unearthed included bricks, glazed and unglazed roof tiles, ridge tiles, and dragon, phoenix and Kalaviṅka roof ornaments. Other artifacts excavated included a black glazed chicken-leg shaped vase, 15 white glazed porcelain bowls with impressed dragon and fish patterns, and two fragments of a gilt bronze dragon head ornament. The porcelain bowls were marked with the characters 尚食局 (shàng shí jú) meaning "Bureau of Imperial Cuisine", which are elsewhere associated with Ding ware. Some of the bricks were marked as 内 (nèi; 'internal'), 宫 (gōng; 'palace'), and 官 (guān; 'official'), which are similar to marks on bricks found at the Liao dynasty Upper Palace at Bairin Left Banner.

Based on the size of the site and an analysis of the various artifacts found there, the archaeologists determined that this must be the remains of an imperial palace of the Jin dynasty, and probably dated to the late middle period of the dynasty, during the reigns of Emperor Shizong (r. 1161–1189) and Emperor Zhangzong (r. 1189–1208). It is probable that this site is the Tai He Palace (Chinese: 泰和宫; pinyin: tàihé gōng) recorded in the History of Jin as being the summer palace where Emperor Zhangzong stayed in 1202 and 1205.

== Venue for 2022 Winter Olympic Games ==
Taizicheng was a venue for the 2022 Winter Olympic Games. All skiing events other than alpine skiing were held in the Taizicheng area.

== Transport ==
- Taizicheng railway station
