= 2024 FIS Ski Jumping Grand Prix =

Ski Jumping Grand Prix

Discipline	Men	Women
Overall	(Poland) Paweł Wąsek	(Italy) Lara Malsiner
Nations Cup	Austria	Japan

Competition
Edition	31st	13th
Locations	5	3
Individual	9	5
Mixed	1	1
Cancelled	–	2
Rescheduled	2	2

The 2024 FIS Ski Jumping Grand Prix, organized by the International Ski Federation (FIS), was the 31st Summer Grand Prix season for men and the 13th for women as the most important series of ski jumping competitions in the summer and autumn of 2024.

The season started on 13 August in Courchevel, France and concluded on 6 October in Klingenthal, Germany.

Vladimir Zografski from Bulgaria (men's) and Nika Vodan from Slovenia (women's) were the reigning champions from the previous season.

Paweł Wąsek from Poland (men's) and Lara Malsiner from Italy (women's) won the Grand Prix overall trophy for the first time in their careers.

== Season overview ==
The provisional calendar of events was presented in October 2023. In April 2024 subcommittee for calendar planning in Prague published the proposed schedule of the Summer Grand Prix for the 2024 season. The competition programs were approved at meeting in Portorož on 8 May.

Unlike the autumn version of the schedule, it was decided not to hold hybrid competitions at the turn of October and November, in which the inrun track is covered with ice and the landing field is entirely covered with plastic mattings.

On 8 August, a storm damaged the counter slope on the Wisła ski jump. For this reason, the competition scheduled for 17–18 August was cancelled and moved to 14–15 September.

== Map of Grand Prix hosts ==
(France) Courchevel	(Poland) Wisła	(Romania) Râșnov	(Austria) Hinzenbach	(Germany) Klingenthal
Tremplin du Praz	Malinka	Trambulină Valea Cărbunării	Aigner-Schanze	Vogtland Arena
Europe Location of all 5 Summer Grand Prix hosts of the season

== Men's Individual ==
The number of men's events in the Grand Prix history

Total	Large	Normal	Winners
237	177	60	82

after L event in Klingenthal (5 October 2024)

=== Calendar ===
N – normal hill / L – large hill
All	No.	Date	Place (Hill)	Size	Winner	Second	Third	Overall leader	R.
229	1	13 August 2024	(France) Courchevel (Tremplin du Praz HS132)	L _{173}	(Austria) Stefan Kraft	(France) Valentin Foubert	(Italy) Alex Insam	(Austria) Stefan Kraft	
230	2	14 August 2024	(France) Courchevel (Tremplin du Praz HS132)	L _{174}	(Austria) Stefan Kraft	(Norway) Fredrik Villumstad	(France) Valentin Foubert	(Austria) Stefan Kraft	
231	3	14 September 2024	(Poland) Wisła (Note: Rescheduled from 17–18 August.) (Malinka HS134)	L _{175}	(Norway) Marius Lindvik	(Estonia) Artti Aigro	(Switzerland) Gregor Deschwanden	(Austria) Stefan Kraft	
232	4	15 September 2024	(Poland) Wisła (Malinka HS134)	L _{176}	(Norway) Marius Lindvik	(Estonia) Artti Aigro	(United States) Tate Frantz	(Austria) Stefan Kraft (Norway) Marius Lindvik	
233	5	21 September 2024	(Romania) Râșnov (Trambulina HS97)	N _{057}	(Poland) Paweł Wąsek	(Austria) Ulrich Wohlgenannt	(United States) Kevin Bickner	(Italy) Alex Insam	
234	6	22 September 2024	(Romania) Râșnov (Trambulina HS97)	N _{058}	(Poland) Paweł Wąsek	(Japan) Ren Nikaidō	(Italy) Alex Insam	(Italy) Alex Insam	
235	7	28 September 2024	(Austria) Hinzenbach (Aigner-Schanze HS90)	N _{059}	(Austria) Daniel Tschofenig	(Germany) Andreas Wellinger	(Austria) Jan Hörl	(Poland) Paweł Wąsek	
236	8	29 September 2024	(Austria) Hinzenbach (Aigner-Schanze HS90)	N _{060}	(Germany) Andreas Wellinger	(Austria) Jan Hörl	(Austria) Stefan Kraft	(Poland) Paweł Wąsek	
237	9	5 October 2024	(Germany) Klingenthal (Vogtland Arena HS140)	L _{177}	(Norway) Marius Lindvik	(Slovenia) Timi Zajc	(Norway) Halvor Egner Granerud	(Poland) Paweł Wąsek	
31st FIS Grand Prix Overall (13 August – 5 October 2024)					(Poland) Paweł Wąsek	(Austria) Stefan Kraft	(Norway) Marius Lindvik	Men's Overall	

=== Standings ===
==== Overall ====
Rank	after all 9 events	Points
	(Poland) Paweł Wąsek	329
2	(Austria) Stefan Kraft	305
3	(Norway) Marius Lindvik	300
4	(Italy) Alex Insam	299
5	(Austria) Jan Hörl	249
6	(Germany) Andreas Wellinger	212
7	(Austria) Daniel Tschofenig	186
8	(Poland) Dawid Kubacki	175
9	(Japan) Ren Nikaidō	173
10	(Estonia) Artti Aigro	169

==== Nations Cup ====
Rank	after all 10 events	Points
	Austria	1490
2	Norway	1070
3	Poland	940
4	Japan	813
5	Germany	807
6	Switzerland	430
7	Italy	374
8	France	372
9	United States	361
10	Slovenia	346

==== Prize money ====
Rank	after all 10 payouts	CHF
1	(Norway) Marius Lindvik	15,750
2	(Austria) Stefan Kraft	12,500
3	(Poland) Paweł Wąsek	10,500
4	(Germany) Andreas Wellinger	9 250
5	(Austria) Daniel Tschofenig (Austria) Jan Hörl	6,500
7	(Estonia) Artti Aigro	6,000
8	(Italy) Alex Insam	5,500
9	(France) Valentin Foubert	5,000
10	(Austria) Ulrich Wohlgenannt (Japan) Ren Nikaidō	4,000

== Women's Individual ==
The number of women's events in the Grand Prix history

Total	Large	Normal	Winners
58	20	38	12

after L event in Klingenthal (5 October 2024)

=== Calendar ===
N – normal hill / L – large hill
All	No.	Date	Place (Hill)	Size	Winner	Second	Third	Overall leader	R.
54	1	13 August 2024	(France) Courchevel (Tremplin du Praz HS132)	L _{018}	(Slovenia) Ema Klinec	(Japan) Sara Takanashi	(Austria) J. Seifriedsberger	(Slovenia) Ema Klinec	
55	2	14 August 2024	(France) Courchevel (Tremplin du Praz HS132)	L _{019}	(Japan) Sara Takanashi	(Austria) J. Seifriedsberger	(France) Joséphine Pagnier	(Japan) Sara Takanashi	
		14 September 2024	(Poland) Wisła (Malinka HS134)	L _{cnx}	canceled due to scheduling conflicts with the ICOC events in Trondheim and lack of international interest resulting in a reduced no. of participants			—	
		15 September 2024	(Poland) Wisła (Malinka HS134)	L _{cnx}	canceled due to scheduling conflicts with the ICOC events in Trondheim and lack of international interest resulting in a reduced no. of participants			—	
56	3	21 September 2024	(Romania) Râșnov (Trambulina HS97)	N _{037}	(Italy) Lara Malsiner	(Italy) Annika Sieff	(Japan) Nozomi Maruyama	(Japan) Sara Takanashi	
57	4	22 September 2024	(Romania) Râșnov (Trambulina HS97)	N _{038}	(Italy) Lara Malsiner	(Japan) Nozomi Maruyama	(Italy) Annika Sieff	(Italy) Lara Malsiner	
58	5	5 October 2024	(Germany) Klingenthal (Vogtland Arena HS140)	L _{020}	(Germany) Katharina Schmid	(Norway) Eirin Maria Kvandal	(Japan) Yūki Itō	(Italy) Lara Malsiner	
13th FIS Grand Prix Overall (13 August – 5 October 2024)					(Italy) Lara Malsiner	(Italy) Annika Sieff	(Japan) Sara Takanashi	Women's Overall	

=== Standings ===
==== Overall ====
Rank	after all 5 events	Points
	(Italy) Lara Malsiner	254
2	(Italy) Annika Sieff	214
3	(Japan) Sara Takanashi	209
4	(Slovenia) Ema Klinec	202
5	(Japan) Nozomi Maruyama	180
6	(Austria) J. Seifriedsberger	176
7	(Slovenia) Nika Prevc	148
8	(France) Joséphine Pagnier	131
9	(Austria) Lisa Eder	119
10	(Japan) Kurumi Ichinohe	114

==== Nations Cup ====
Rank	after all 6 events	Points
	Japan	872
2	Italy	628
3	Slovenia	605
4	Austria	522
5	Norway	421
6	Germany	366
7	France	319
8	Canada	182
9	China	177
10	United States	127

==== Prize money ====
Rank	after all 6 payouts	CHF
1	(Italy) Lara Malsiner	5,000
2	(Japan) Sara Takanashi	4,000
3	(Germany) Katharina Schmid	3,750
4	(Austria) J. Seifriedsberger	3,000
5	(Japan) Nozomi Maruyama	2,750
6	(Slovenia) Ema Klinec (Italy) Annika Sieff	2,500
8	(Norway) Eirin Maria Kvandal	2,250
9	(Germany) Selina Freitag	1,500
10	(France) Joséphine Pagnier (Austria) Lisa Eder (Norway) Thea Minyan Bjørseth	1,250

== Team events ==
The number of team events in the Grand Prix history

Total	Large	Normal	Winners	Competition
11	6	5	4	Mixed team

after L event in Klingenthal (6 October 2024)

L – large hill
All	No.	Date	Place (Hill)	Size	Winner	Second	Third	R.
Mixed team
11	1	6 October 2024	(Germany) Klingenthal (Vogtland Arena HS140)	L _{006}	Germany Selina Freitag; Pius Paschke; Katharina Schmid; Andreas Wellinger	Norway Thea Minyan Bjørseth; Halvor Egner Granerud; Eirin Maria Kvandal; Marius Lindvik	Austria Lisa Eder; Jan Hörl; Jacqueline Seifriedsberger; Daniel Tschofenig	

== Podium table by nation ==
Table showing the Grand Prix podium places (gold–1st place, silver–2nd place, bronze–3rd place) by the countries represented by the athletes.

Rank	Nation	Gold	Silver	Bronze	Total
1	Austria	3	3	4	10
2	Norway	3	3	1	7
3	Germany	3	1	0	4
4	Italy	2	1	3	6
5	Poland	2	0	0	2
6	Japan	1	3	2	6
7	Slovenia	1	1	0	2
8	Estonia	0	2	0	2
9	France	0	1	2	3
10	United States	0	0	2	2
11	Switzerland	0	0	1	1
Totals (11 entries)		15	15	15	45

== Points distribution ==
The table shows the number of points won in the 2024 FIS Ski Jumping Grand Prix for men and women.

Place	1	2	3	4	5	6	7	8	9	10	11	12	13	14	15	16	17	18	19	20	21	22	23	24	25	26	27	28	29	30
Individual	100	80	60	50	45	40	36	32	29	26	24	22	20	18	16	15	14	13	12	11	10	9	8	7	6	5	4	3	2	1
Mixed	200	175	150	125	100	75	50	25

== See also ==
- 2024–25 FIS Ski Jumping World Cup
- 2024–25 FIS Ski Jumping Continental Cup
- 2024–25 FIS Ski Jumping Inter-Continental Cup
- 2024–25 FIS Cup (ski jumping)
