= 2024–25 FIS Ski Jumping Inter-Continental Cup =

Ski-jumping competition series

2024–25 FIS Inter-Continental Cup
Winners
- Summer: (Germany) Katharina Schmid
- Winter: (Germany) Emely Torazza
- Nations Cup Summer: Germany
- Nations Cup Winter: Germany

Competitions
- Venues: 5 (summer), 7 (winter)
- Individual: 10 (summer), 14 (winter)

The 2024–25 FIS Ski Jumping Inter-Continental Cup, the women's second level competition, equaled men's Continental Cup and organized by the International Ski Federation (FIS) was the 1st edition of the Women's Inter-Continental Cup – the second highest competition series of ski jumping for women, which was created as a result of combining two previous competitions – and succeeded the women's Continental Cup (2004/05) season and the FIS Cup (2012/13).

The season started on 10 August 2024 in Hinterzarten, Germany and ended on 15 March 2025 in Lahti, Finland. Annika Sieff from Italy (summer) and Tina Erzar from Slovenia (winter) were overall defending champions from the previous season. The summer title went to Katharina Schmid from Germany, while the winter title went to Emely Torazza also from Germany.

Other competitive circuits this season include the World Cup, Grand Prix, Continental Cup, FIS Cup, Alpen Cup and New Star Trophy.

As of Schmid's victory in Zhangjiakou, it was the first time that the leader of the World Cup was simultaneously the leader of the Inter-Continental Cup.

== Map of Inter-Continental Cup hosts ==
Europe Location of all 11 Continental Cup hosts of the season (5 summer / 7 winter)	Asia

== Women's Summer ==
Individual summer events in the ICC history

Total	L	N	Winners
14	4	10	10

after normal hill event in Otepää (6 October 2024)

=== Calendar ===
N – normal hill / L – large hill
All	No.	Date	Place (Hill)	Size	Winner	Second	Third	Overall leader	R.
5	1	10 August 2024	(Germany) Hinterzarten (Adler Ski Stadium HS109)	N _{005}	(Germany) Selina Freitag	(Slovenia) Tina Erzar	(Germany) Juliane Seyfarth	(Germany) Selina Freitag	
6	2	11 August 2024	(Germany) Hinterzarten (Adler Ski Stadium HS109)	N _{006}	(Germany) Katharina Schmid	(Germany) Selina Freitag	(Czech Republic) Karolína Indráčková	(Germany) Selina Freitag	
7	3	14 September 2024	(Norway) Trondheim (Granåsen HS102)	N _{007}	(Germany) Katharina Schmid	(Norway) Anna Odine Strøm	(Norway) T. Minyan Bjørseth	(Germany) Selina Freitag	
8	4	15 September 2024	(Norway) Trondheim (Granåsen HS102)	N _{008}	(Germany) Katharina Schmid	(Norway) Eirin Maria Kvandal	(Norway) Anna Odine Strøm	(Germany) Katharina Schmid	
9	5	21 September 2024	(Austria) Stams (Brunnentalschanze HS115)	L _{001}	(France) Joséphine Pagnier	(Germany) Agnes Reisch	(Austria) Meghann Wadsak	(Germany) Katharina Schmid	
10	6	22 September 2024	(Austria) Stams (Brunnentalschanze HS115)	L _{002}	(France) Joséphine Pagnier	(Germany) Agnes Reisch	(Austria) Meghann Wadsak	(Germany) Katharina Schmid	
11	7	28 September 2024	(Switzerland) Einsiedeln (Schanzen Einsiedeln HS117)	L _{003}	(Slovenia) Maja Kovačič	(Switzerland) Sina Arnet	(Austria) Meghann Wadsak	(Germany) Katharina Schmid	
12	8	29 September 2024	(Switzerland) Einsiedeln (Schanzen Einsiedeln HS117)	L _{004}	(Switzerland) Sina Arnet	(Slovenia) Maja Kovačič	(Slovenia) Lara Logar	(Germany) Katharina Schmid	
13	9	5 October 2024	(Estonia) Otepää (Tehvandi HS97)	N _{009}	(Finland) Heta Hirvonen	(Norway) I. S. Midtskogen	(Italy) Martina Ambrosi	(Germany) Katharina Schmid	
14	10	6 October 2024	(Estonia) Otepää (Tehvandi HS97)	N _{010}	(Norway) I. S. Midtskogen	(Italy) Martina Ambrosi	(Finland) Heta Hirvonen	(Germany) Katharina Schmid	
2nd FIS Summer Inter-Continental Cup Overall (10 August – 6 October 2024)					(Germany) Katharina Schmid	(Switzerland) Sina Arnet	(Austria) Meghann Wadsak	Summer Overall	

==== Overall ====
Rank	after 10 events	Points
	(Germany) Katharina Schmid	300
2	(Switzerland) Sina Arnet	289
3	(Austria) Meghann Wadsak	277
4	(Slovenia) Maja Kovačič	251
5	(France) Joséphine Pagnier	250
6	(Germany) Selina Freitag	248
7	(Germany) Anges Reisch	221
8	(Czech Republic) Karolína Indráčková	204
9	(Norway) Ingvild Synnøve Midtskogen	196
10	(Germany) Juliane Seyfarth	181

==== Nations Cup ====
Rank	after 10 events	Points
	Germany	1750
2	Slovenia	1041
3	Norway	859
4	Finland	546
5	Austria	475
6	Switzerland	456
7	Czech Republic	424
8	Italy	400
9	France	314
10	Ukraine	159

== Women's Winter ==
Individual summer events in the ICC history

Total	L	N	Winners
26	10	16	10

after large hill event in Lahti (15 March 2025)

=== Calendar ===
N – normal hill / L – large hill
All	No.	Date	Place (Hill)	Size	Winner	Second	Third	Overall leader	R.
13	1	7 December 2024	(China) Zhangjiakou (Snow Ruyi HS106)	N _{007}	(Germany) Katharina Schmid	(China) Liu Qi	(Germany) Anna Hollandt	(Germany) Katharina Schmid	
14	2	8 December 2024	(China) Zhangjiakou (Snow Ruyi HS106)	N _{008}	(Germany) Katharina Schmid	(Germany) Selina Freitag	(Germany) Juliane Seyfarth	(Germany) Katharina Schmid	
15	3	13 December 2024	(Norway) Notodden (Tveitanbakken HS98)	N _{009}	(Norway) Silje Opseth	(Norway) H. Dyhre Traaserud	(Austria) Meghann Wadsak	(Germany) Katharina Schmid	
16	4	14 December 2024	(Norway) Notodden (Tveitanbakken HS98)	N _{010}	(Poland) Anna Twardosz	(Norway) Silje Opseth	(Norway) H. Dyhre Traaserud	(Germany) Katharina Schmid	
17	5	4 January 2025	(Sweden) Falun (Lugnet HS100)	N _{011}	(Germany) Emely Torazza	(Switzerland) Sina Arnet	(Germany) Pia Lilian Kübler	(Germany) Katharina Schmid	
18	6	5 January 2025	(Sweden) Falun (Lugnet HS100)	N _{012}	(Germany) Emely Torazza	(Germany) Kim Amy Duschek	(Switzerland) Sina Arnet	(Germany) Emely Torazza	
19	7	17 January 2025	(Austria) Bischofshofen (Paul-Ausserleitner HS142)	L _{007}	(Germany) Emely Torazza	(Germany) Kim Amy Duschek	(Austria) Chiara Kreuzer	(Germany) Emely Torazza	
20	8	18 January 2025	(Austria) Bischofshofen (Paul-Ausserleitner HS142)	L _{008}	(Germany) Emely Torazza	(Slovenia) Tina Erzar	(Austria) Chiara Kreuzer	(Germany) Emely Torazza	
		8 February 2025	(Austria) Villach (Villacher Alpenarena HS98)	N _{cnx}	cancelled and replaced in Eisenerz on same dates			—	
		9 February 2025	(Austria) Villach (Villacher Alpenarena HS98)	N _{cnx}	cancelled and replaced in Eisenerz on same dates			—	
21	9	(Note: Cancelled event from Villach (8 February) was rescheduled to Eisenerz on same date.)8 February 2025	(Austria) Eisenerz (Erzbergschanzen HS109)	N _{013}	(Germany) Emely Torazza	(Germany) Alvine Holz	(Austria) Chiara Kreuzer	(Germany) Emely Torazza	
22	10	(Note: Cancelled event from Villach (9 February) was rescheduled to Eisenerz on same date.)9 February 2025	(Austria) Eisenerz (Erzbergschanzen HS109)	N _{014}	(Germany) Emely Torazza	(Germany) Luisa Görlich	(Germany) Maike Tyralla	(Germany) Emely Torazza	
23	11	1 March 2025	(Germany) Oberhof (Kanzlersgrund HS100)	N _{015}	(Germany) Alvine Holz	(Austria) Hannah Wiegele	(Slovenia) Tinkara Komar	(Germany) Emely Torazza	
24	12	2 March 2025	(Germany) Oberhof (Kanzlersgrund HS100)	N _{016}	(Germany) Alvine Holz	(Germany) Julina Kreibich	(Austria) Hannah Wiegele	(Germany) Emely Torazza	
25	13	14 March 2025	(Finland) Lahti (Salpausselkä HS130)	L _{009}	(Germany) Emely Torazza	(Slovenia) Tina Erzar	(Austria) Chiara Kreuzer	(Germany) Emely Torazza	
26	14	15 March 2025	(Finland) Lahti (Salpausselkä HS130)	L _{010}	(Germany) Emely Torazza	(Japan) Yūka Setō	(Japan) Yuzuki Satō	(Germany) Emely Torazza	
2nd FIS Winter Inter-Continental Cup Overall (7 December 2024 – 15 March 2025)					(Germany) Emely Torazza	(Austria) Chiara Kreuzer	(Germany) Alvine Holz	Winter Overall	

==== Overall ====
Rank	after 14 events	Points
	(Germany) Emely Torazza	847
2	(Austria) Chiara Kreuzer	475
3	(Germany) Alvine Holz	366
4	(Austria) Hannah Wiegele	348
5	(Germany) Kim Amy Duschek	319
6	(Switzerland) Sina Arnet	297
7	(Slovenia) Tina Erzar	260
8	(Germany) Pia Lilian Kübler	233
9	(Slovenia) Tinkara Komar	229
10	(Italy) Jessica Malsiner	228

==== Nations Cup ====
Rank	after 14 events	Points
	Germany	3221
2	Slovenia	1579
3	Austria	1287
4	Norway	684
5	Switzerland	569
6	China	556
7	Italy	538
8	Finland	314
9	Poland	234
10	Japan	230

== Podium table by nation ==
Table showing the Inter-Continental Cup podium places (gold–1st place, silver–2nd place, bronze–3rd place) by the countries represented by the athletes.

Rank	Nation	Gold	Silver	Bronze	Total
1	Germany	16	9	5	30
2	Norway	2	5	3	10
3	France	2	0	0	2
4	Slovenia	1	4	2	7
5	Switzerland	1	2	1	4
6	Finland	1	0	1	2
7	Poland	1	0	0	1
8	Austria	0	1	9	10
9	Italy	0	1	1	2
9	Japan	0	1	1	2
11	China	0	1	0	1
12	Czech Republic	0	0	1	1
Totals (12 entries)		24	24	24	72

== See also ==
- 2024–25 FIS Ski Jumping World Cup
- 2024 FIS Ski Jumping Grand Prix
- 2024–25 FIS Ski Jumping Continental Cup (men)
