= 2024–25 FIS Ski Jumping World Cup =

Ski jumping championship season

Discipline	Men	Women
Overall	(Austria) Daniel Tschofenig (1st title)	(Slovenia) Nika Prevc (2nd title)
Nations Cup	Austria (22nd)	Germany (3rd)
Ski Flying	(Slovenia) Domen Prevc (1st)	—

Stage events
Four Hills Tournament	(Austria) Daniel Tschofenig (1st)	—
Two Nights Tournament	—	(Slovenia) Nika Prevc (2nd)
Raw Air	(Germany) Andreas Wellinger (1st)	(Slovenia) Nika Prevc (1st)
Planica7	(Slovenia) Domen Prevc (1st)	—

Competition
Edition	46th	14th
Locations	18	15
Individual	29	24
Team	2 + 2 super team	1 super team
Mixed	3	3
Cancelled	–	2

The 2024–25 FIS Ski Jumping World Cup was the 46th World Cup season for men, the 28th season in ski flying, and the 14th season for women as the highest level of international ski jumping competitions, organized by the International Ski Federation (FIS).

The men's (29 events) and women's (24 events) season both started on 22 November 2024 in Lillehammer, Norway. The men's season concluded on 30 March 2025 in Planica, Slovenia, while the women's season ended on 21 March 2025 in Lahti, Finland.

For the peak of the season, they took a break in February and March for the FIS Nordic World Ski Championships in Trondheim, Norway, which ended with one of the biggest scandals in the ski jumping sport history, with inappropriate Norwegian suits and disqualifications.

Austrian champion Stefan Kraft and Nika Prevc from Slovenia (with record 15 ins) were the reigning champions from the previous season. Kraft did not defend his title, finishing the season as 3rd.

Daniel Tschofenig from Austria claimed the Crystal Globe and the 4H Tournament for the first time, while Prevc successfully defended her title, securing her second World Cup title in a row.

== Season overview ==
The provisional calendar of events was introduced in October 2023. In April 2024, the subcommittee for calendar planning in Prague published the proposed schedule for the 2024–25 World Cup season. The competition programs were officially approved during a meeting in Portorož on 8 May.

On 7 June 2024, it was announced that the World Cup competitions scheduled for 11–12 January 2025 at the modernized olympic hill Trampolino Dal Ben (HS143) in Predazzo would not take place. Organizers decided to cancel the pre-Olympic trials six months in advance due to all delays in facility reconstruction. The test event is now expected to be rescheduled during the Summer Grand Prix. Meanwhile, the final rehearsal for the 2026 Ski Flying World Championship in Oberstdorf was set for late January.

The 2024–25 season has already seen several historic moments. After his victory in Lillehammer, Pius Paschke became the oldest leader in World Cup history at 34 years and 187 days. Tschofenig made history as the first ski jumper born in the 21st century to win a World Cup competition.

During the qualification for the first competition of the Four Hills Tournament in Oberstdorf, Austrian ski jumpers took the top five spots. This was the first time in the history of the World Cup that such a situation occurred. Having four athletes in the top five of the qualifications had happened a few times before, but never had even the top four spots been taken by a one team.

For the first time in history, siblings Domen Prevc and Nika Prevc both secured World Cup victories on the same weekend — Domen triumphing in Ski Flying in Oberstdorf, while Nika claimed victory in Zaō. Nika further cemented her place in the record books by becoming the first female ski jumper to win World Cup events on three different continents (Europe, Asia, and North America) after her triumph in Lake Placid.

Meanwhile, ski jumping legend Noriaki Kasai extended his own records. On 16 February 2025, during the individual competition in Sapporo, the 52-year-old became the oldest competitor in a World Cup event at 52 years, 8 months, and 10 days. It also marked his 579th World Cup appearance, further solidifying his place in the sport’s history.

A scandal involving equipment tampering by the Norwegian ski jumping team erupted during the World Ski Championships in Trondheim. Ahead of the Raw Air tournament, FIS provisionally suspended three Norwegian team officials and two athletes as part of an ongoing investigation into alleged rule violations during the Men’s Large Hill competition at the Trondheim 2025 Championships. Following an initial review, head coach Magnus Brevik, assistant coach Thomas Lobben, service staff member Adrian Livelten, and athletes Marius Lindvik and Johann André Forfang have been formally placed under investigation. Effective immediately, they are banned from participating in all FIS events and competitions organized by any National Ski Association until the inquiry and adjudication process is complete.

On 14 March 2025, the day before her 20th birthday, Nika Prevc set a new women's ski flying world record, twice reaching a distance of 236 meters (774 ft) during official training 1 and 3 at the Vikersundbakken hill in Vikersund, Norway. Prevc broke the previous record held by Norwegian ski jumper Silje Opseth, who had set the mark at 230.5 meters on the same hill in March 2024.

At the final competition of the season on 21 March, Nika Prevc achieved her 10th consecutive World Cup victory and her 15th win of the season. With this accomplishment, the Slovenian equaled Sara Takanashi's record results from the 2013–2014 and 2015–2016 seasons, respectively. Prevc's winning margin over the second-place finisher Selina Freitag was 51.4 points — the largest in the history of the Ski Jumping World Cup, regardless of gender. The previous overall record was a 47.5-point lead by Andreas Felder over Ole Gunnar Fidjestøl in Planica on 14 March 1987, while the women’s record stood at 41.7 points, set by Marita Kramer over Chiara Kreuzer in Nizhny Tagil on 26 November 2021. Additionally, Prevc equaled Maren Lundby's record of 19 women's World Cup podium finishes in a single season, a milestone Lundby achieved in the 2018–2019 season.

On 30 March 2025, during the final competition of the season in Planica, Domen Prevc set a new ski flying distance record of 254.5 meters (835 ft), surpassing by 1 meter the previous record set by Stefan Kraft at Vikersundbakken on 18 March 2017. This marks the first time in over eight years that the record has been broken, after 14 years again world record (29th set there) returned to Planica.

== World records ==
List of world record distances achieved within this World Cup season.

Date	Athlete	Hill	Round	Place	Metres	Feet
Women
14 March 2025	(Slovenia) Nika Prevc	Vikersundbakken HS240	Training – R1	Vikersund, Norway	236	774
14 March 2025	(Slovenia) Nika Prevc	Vikersundbakken HS240	Training – R3	Vikersund, Norway	236	774
Men
30 March 2025	(Slovenia) Domen Prevc	Letalnica bratov Gorišek HS240	Final	Planica, Slovenia	254.5	835

== Map of World Cup hosts ==
The following list contains all 23 World Cup hosts of the season.

(Norway) Lillehammer	(Finland) Ruka	(Poland) Wisła	(Germany) Titisee-Neustadt	(Switzerland) Engelberg	(Germany) Oberstdorf
Lysgårdsbakken	Rukatunturi	Malinka	Hochfirstschanze	Gross-Titlis-Schanze	Schattenbergschanze
(Germany) Garmisch-Pa	(Austria) Innsbruck	(Austria) Bischofshofen	(Poland) Zakopane	(Germany) Oberstdorf	(Germany) Willingen
Große Olympiaschanze	Bergiselschanze	Paul-Ausserleitner	Wielka Krokiew	Heini-Klopfer	Mühlenkopfschanze
(United States) Lake Placid	(Japan) Sapporo	(Norway) Oslo	(Norway) Vikersund	(Finland) Lahti	(Slovenia) Planica
MacKenzie Intervale	Ōkurayama	Holmenkollbakken	Vikersundbakken	Salpausselkä	Letalnica bratov Gorišek
(China) Zhangjiakou	(Austria) Villach	(Japan) Zaō	(Slovenia) Ljubno ob Savinji	(Austria) Hinzenbach	
Snow Ruyi	Villacher Alpenarena	Yamagata	Savina Center	Aigner-Schanze	
Europe
Germany		Austria United States		Asia	

== Men's Individual ==
Individual events in the World Cup history

Total	F	L	N	Winners
1148	152	834	162	172

after final Flying hill event in Planica (30 March 2025)

=== Calendar ===
Event key: N – normal hill / L – large hill / F – flying hill
All	No.	Date	Place (Hill)	Size	Winner	Second	Third	Overall Leader	R.
1120	1	23 November 2024	(Norway) Lillehammer (Lysgårdsbakken HS140)	L _{812}	(Germany) Pius Paschke	(Austria) Daniel Tschofenig	(Austria) Maximilian Ortner	(Germany) Pius Paschke	
1121	2	24 November 2024	(Norway) Lillehammer (Lysgårdsbakken HS140)	L _{813}	(Austria) Jan Hörl	(Germany) Pius Paschke	(Austria) Daniel Tschofenig	(Germany) Pius Paschke	
1122	3	30 November 2024	(Finland) Ruka (Rukatunturi HS142)	L _{814}	(Germany) Pius Paschke	(Austria) Jan Hörl	(Austria) Stefan Kraft	(Germany) Pius Paschke	
1123	4	(Note: Individual men's event in Ruka (1 December) had only one round due to strong wind.)1 December 2024	(Finland) Ruka (Rukatunturi HS142)	L _{815}	(Germany) Andreas Wellinger	(Austria) Stefan Kraft	(Germany) Karl Geiger	(Germany) Pius Paschke	
1124	5	7 December 2024	(Poland) Wisła (Malinka HS134)	L _{816}	(Austria) Daniel Tschofenig	(Switzerland) Gregor Deschwanden	(Germany) Pius Paschke	(Germany) Pius Paschke	
1125	6	8 December 2024	(Poland) Wisła (Malinka HS134)	L _{817}	(Germany) Pius Paschke	(Austria) Jan Hörl	(Austria) Stefan Kraft	(Germany) Pius Paschke	
1126	7	14 December 2024	(Germany) Titisee-Neustadt (Hochfirstschanze HS142)	L _{818}	(Germany) Pius Paschke	(Switzerland) Gregor Deschwanden	(Austria) Daniel Tschofenig	(Germany) Pius Paschke	
1127	8	15 December 2024	(Germany) Titisee-Neustadt (Hochfirstschanze HS142)	L _{819}	(Germany) Pius Paschke	(Austria) Michael Hayböck	(Norway) Kristoffer Eriksen Sundal	(Germany) Pius Paschke	
1128	9	21 December 2024	(Switzerland) Engelberg (Gross-Titlis HS140)	L _{820}	(Austria) Jan Hörl	(Austria) Daniel Tschofenig	(Switzerland) Gregor Deschwanden	(Germany) Pius Paschke	
1129	10	22 December 2024	(Switzerland) Engelberg (Gross-Titlis HS140)	L _{821}	(Austria) Daniel Tschofenig	(Austria) Jan Hörl	(Austria) Stefan Kraft	(Germany) Pius Paschke	
1130	11	29 December 2024	(Germany) Oberstdorf (Schattenberg HS137)	L _{822}	(Austria) Stefan Kraft	(Austria) Jan Hörl	(Austria) Daniel Tschofenig	(Germany) Pius Paschke	
1131	12	1 January 2025	(Germany) Garmisch-Pa (Olympiaschanze HS142)	L _{823}	(Austria) Daniel Tschofenig	(Switzerland) Gregor Deschwanden	(Austria) Michael Hayböck	(Austria) Daniel Tschofenig	
1132	13	4 January 2025	(Austria) Innsbruck (Bergiselschanze HS128)	L _{824}	(Austria) Stefan Kraft	(Austria) Jan Hörl	(Austria) Daniel Tschofenig	(Austria) Daniel Tschofenig	
1133	14	6 January 2025	(Austria) Bischofshofen (Paul-Ausserleitner HS142)	L _{825}	(Austria) Daniel Tschofenig	(Austria) Jan Hörl	(Austria) Stefan Kraft	(Austria) Daniel Tschofenig	
73rd Four Hills Tournament Overall (29 December 2024 – 6 January 2025)					(Austria) Daniel Tschofenig	(Austria) Jan Hörl	(Austria) Stefan Kraft	Four Hills Tournament	
1134	15	19 January 2025	(Poland) Zakopane (Wielka Krokiew HS140)	L _{826}	(Austria) Daniel Tschofenig	(Norway) Johann André Forfang	(Austria) Jan Hörl	(Austria) Daniel Tschofenig	
1135	16	25 January 2025	(Germany) Oberstdorf (Heini-Klopfer HS235)	F _{147}	(Slovenia) Timi Zajc	(Norway) Johann André Forfang	(Slovenia) Domen Prevc	(Austria) Daniel Tschofenig	
1136	17	26 January 2025	(Germany) Oberstdorf (Heini-Klopfer HS235)	F _{148}	(Slovenia) Domen Prevc	(Norway) Johann André Forfang	(Austria) Michael Hayböck	(Austria) Daniel Tschofenig	
1137	18	1 February 2025	(Germany) Willingen (Mühlenkopf HS147)	L _{827}	(Austria) Daniel Tschofenig	(Slovenia) Anže Lanišek	(Austria) Maximilian Ortner	(Austria) Daniel Tschofenig	
1138	19	2 February 2025	(Germany) Willingen (Mühlenkopf HS147)	L _{828}	(Austria) Daniel Tschofenig	(Norway) Johann André Forfang	(Austria) Jan Hörl	(Austria) Daniel Tschofenig	
1139	20	8 February 2025	(United States) Lake Placid (MacKenzie Int. HS128)	L _{829}	(Norway) Johann André Forfang	(Austria) Jan Hörl	(Austria) Daniel Tschofenig	(Austria) Daniel Tschofenig	
1140	21	9 February 2025	(United States) Lake Placid (MacKenzie Int. HS128)	L _{830}	(Austria) Daniel Tschofenig	(Austria) Jan Hörl	(Slovenia) Anže Lanišek	(Austria) Daniel Tschofenig	
1141	22	15 February 2025	(Japan) Sapporo (Ōkurayama HS137)	L _{831}	(Japan) Ryōyū Kobayashi	(Austria) Jan Hörl	(Slovenia) Domen Prevc	(Austria) Daniel Tschofenig	
1142	23	16 February 2025	(Japan) Sapporo (Ōkurayama HS137)	L _{832}	(Japan) Ryōyū Kobayashi	(Norway) Marius Lindvik	(Norway) Johann André Forfang	(Austria) Daniel Tschofenig	
FIS Nordic World Ski Championships 2025 (1 – 8 March • Trondheim, Norway)
prologue		13 March 2025	(Norway) Oslo (Holmenkollen HS134)	L _{Qro}	(Germany) Karl Geiger	(Germany) Andreas Wellinger	(Japan) Ryōyū Kobayashi	—	
1143	24	13 March 2025	(Norway) Oslo (Holmenkollen HS134)	L _{833}	(Japan) Ryōyū Kobayashi	(Austria) Jan Hörl	(Germany) Karl Geiger	(Austria) Daniel Tschofenig	
prologue		14 March 2025	(Norway) Vikersund (Vikersundbakken HS240)	F _{Qro}	(Slovenia) Domen Prevc	(Austria) Stefan Kraft	(Slovenia) Timi Zajc	—	
1144	25	15 March 2025	(Norway) Vikersund (Vikersundbakken HS240)	F _{149}	(Germany) Andreas Wellinger	(Slovenia) Timi Zajc	(Slovenia) Anže Lanišek	(Austria) Daniel Tschofenig	
prologue		(Note: Individual men's ski flying event in Vikersund (16 March) had only one round due to strong wind.)16 March 2025	(Norway) Vikersund (Vikersundbakken HS240)	F _{Qro}	cancelled due to strong wind			—	
1145	26	16 March 2025	(Norway) Vikersund (Vikersundbakken HS240)	F _{150}	(Slovenia) Domen Prevc	(Germany) Andreas Wellinger	(Japan) Ryōyū Kobayashi	(Austria) Daniel Tschofenig	
8th Raw Air Men's Overall (13 – 16 March 2025)					(Germany) Andreas Wellinger	(Slovenia) Domen Prevc	(Japan) Ryōyū Kobayashi	Raw Air	
1146	27	22 March 2025	(Finland) Lahti (Salpausselkä HS130)	L _{834}	(Slovenia) Anže Lanišek	(Austria) Stefan Kraft	(Poland) Paweł Wąsek	(Austria) Daniel Tschofenig	
qualifying		27 March 2025	(Slovenia) Planica (Letalnica b. Gorišek HS240)	F _{Qro}	(Germany) Andreas Wellinger	(Germany) Pius Paschke	(Germany) Markus Eisenbichler	—	
1147	28	28 March 2025	(Slovenia) Planica (Letalnica b. Gorišek HS240)	F _{151}	(Slovenia) Domen Prevc	(Slovenia) Anže Lanišek	(Japan) Ryōyū Kobayashi	(Austria) Daniel Tschofenig	
team		29 March 2025	(Slovenia) Planica (Letalnica b. Gorišek HS240)	F _{T}	(Slovenia) Domen Prevc	(Germany) Andreas Wellinger	(Slovenia) Anže Lanišek	—	
1148	29	30 March 2025	(Slovenia) Planica (Letalnica b. Gorišek HS240)	F _{152}	(Slovenia) Anže Lanišek	(Slovenia) Domen Prevc	(Germany) Andreas Wellinger	(Austria) Daniel Tschofenig	
7th Planica7 Overall (27 – 30 March 2025)					(Slovenia) Domen Prevc	(Slovenia) Anže Lanišek	(Germany) Andreas Wellinger	Planica7	
46th FIS World Cup Men's Overall (23 November 2024 – 30 March 2025)					(Austria) Daniel Tschofenig	(Austria) Jan Hörl	(Austria) Stefan Kraft	World Cup Overall	

=== Standings ===
==== Overall ====
Rank	after 29 events	Points
	(Austria) Daniel Tschofenig	1805
2	(Austria) Jan Hörl	1652
3	(Austria) Stefan Kraft	1290
4	(Slovenia) Anže Lanišek	1056
5	(Germany) Pius Paschke	1006
6	(Switzerland) Gregor Deschwanden	996
7	(Germany) Andreas Wellinger	989
8	(Norway) Johann André Forfang	955
9	(Japan) Ryōyū Kobayashi	910
10	(Slovenia) Domen Prevc	776

==== Nations Cup ====
Rank	after 36 events	Points
	Austria	8343
2	Germany	4523
3	Norway	3956
4	Slovenia	3892
5	Japan	2421
6	Poland	2062
7	Switzerland	1553
8	United States	875
9	Finland	414
10	Estonia	265

==== Prize money ====
Rank	after 39 payouts	CHF
1	(Austria) Daniel Tschofenig	372,550
2	(Austria) Jan Hörl	249,850
3	(Austria) Stefan Kraft	182,550
4	(Germany) Andreas Wellinger	180,850
5	(Slovenia) Anže Lanišek	160,450
6	(Germany) Pius Paschke	154,150
7	(Slovenia) Domen Prevc	149,500
8	(Norway) Johann André Forfang	135,250
9	(Japan) Ryōyū Kobayashi	127,500
10	(Switzerland) Gregor Deschwanden	124,600

==== Ski flying ====
Rank	after 6 events	Points
	(Slovenia) Domen Prevc	485
2	(Slovenia) Anže Lanišek	317
3	(Germany) Andreas Wellinger	310
4	(Japan) Ryōyū Kobayashi	280
5	(Slovenia) Timi Zajc	268
6	(Austria) Daniel Tschofenig	224
7	(Austria) Jan Hörl	200
8	(Austria) Stefan Kraft	185
9	(Switzerland) Gregor Deschwanden	165
10	(Germany) Karl Geiger	162

==== Four Hills Tournament ====
Rank	after 4 events	Points
	(Austria) Daniel Tschofenig	1194.4
2	(Austria) Jan Hörl	1193.0
3	(Austria) Stefan Kraft	1190.3
4	(Norway) Johann André Forfang	1154.2
5	(Switzerland) Gregor Deschwanden	1151.9
6	(Germany) Pius Paschke	1134.0
7	(Austria) Michael Hayböck	1128.6
8	(Poland) Paweł Wąsek	1109.3
9	(Austria) Maximilian Ortner	1107.3
10	(Slovenia) Anže Lanišek	1099.0

==== Raw Air ====
Rank	after 5 events	Points
1	(Germany) Andreas Wellinger	1202.2
2	(Slovenia) Domen Prevc	1185.9
3	(Japan) Ryōyū Kobayashi	1178.3
4	(Slovenia) Anže Lanišek	1158.2
5	(Austria) Jan Hörl	1123.1
6	(Slovenia) Timi Zajc	1122.5
7	(Austria) Stefan Kraft	1121.1
8	(Germany) Karl Geiger	1109.2
9	(Switzerland) Gregor Deschwanden	1091.4
10	(Austria) Manuel Fettner	1084.3

==== Planica7 ====
Rank	after 4 events	Points
1	(Slovenia) Domen Prevc	1617.7
2	(Slovenia) Anže Lanišek	1598.3
3	(Germany) Andreas Wellinger	1568.8
4	(Austria) Daniel Tschofenig	1552.8
5	(Japan) Ryōyū Kobayashi	1538.0
6	(Austria) Stefan Kraft	1506.7
7	(Germany) Pius Paschke	1492.9
8	(Austria) Jan Hörl	1486.2
9	(Slovenia) Timi Zajc	1478.5
10	(Germany) Karl Geiger	1467.4

== Women's Individual ==
Individual events in the World Cup history

Total	F	L	N	Winners
257	2	81	174	28

after final Large hill event in Lahti (21 March 2025)

=== Calendar ===
Event key: N – normal hill / L – large hill / F – flying hill
All	No.	Date	Place (Hill)	Size	Winner	Second	Third	Overall Leader	R.
234	1	23 November 2024	(Norway) Lillehammer (Lysgårdsbakken HS140)	L _{069}	(Slovenia) Nika Prevc	(Germany) Katharina Schmid	(Germany) Selina Freitag	(Slovenia) Nika Prevc	
235	2	24 November 2024	(Norway) Lillehammer (Lysgårdsbakken HS140)	L _{070}	(Germany) Katharina Schmid	(Germany) Selina Freitag	(Austria) Lisa Eder	(Germany) Katharina Schmid	
236	3	14 December 2024	(China) Zhangjiakou (Snow Ruyi HS106)	N _{165}	(Germany) Katharina Schmid	(Norway) Eirin Maria Kvandal	(Slovenia) Nika Prevc	(Germany) Katharina Schmid	
237	4	15 December 2024	(China) Zhangjiakou (Snow Ruyi HS106)	N _{166}	(Germany) Katharina Schmid	(Slovenia) Ema Klinec	(Austria) Lisa Eder	(Germany) Katharina Schmid	
238	5	21 December 2024	(Switzerland) Engelberg (Gross-Titlis HS140)	L _{071}	(Slovenia) Nika Prevc	(Germany) Katharina Schmid	(Norway) Thea Minyan Bjørseth	(Germany) Katharina Schmid	
		22 December 2024	(Switzerland) Engelberg (Gross-Titlis HS140)	L _{cnx}	cancelled due to bad weather after 47 of 55 jumpers completed their jumps			—	
239	6	31 December 2024	(Germany) Garmisch-Pa (Olympiaschanze HS142)	L _{072}	(Slovenia) Nika Prevc	(Norway) Eirin Maria Kvandal	(Austria) Eva Pinkelnig	(Germany) Katharina Schmid	
240	7	1 January 2025	(Germany) Oberstdorf (Schattenberg HS137)	L _{073}	(Slovenia) Nika Prevc	(Norway) Anna Odine Strøm	(Norway) Eirin Maria Kvandal	(Germany) Katharina Schmid	
2nd Two Nights Tournament Overall (31 December 2024 – 1 January 2025)					(Slovenia) Nika Prevc	(Norway) Eirin Maria Kvandal	(Germany) Katharina Schmid	Two Nights Tournament	
241	8	5 January 2025	(Austria) Villach (Alpenarena HS98)	N _{167}	(Germany) Katharina Schmid	(Slovenia) Nika Prevc	(Austria) Jacqueline Seifriedsberger	(Germany) Katharina Schmid	
242	9	6 January 2025	(Austria) Villach (Alpenarena HS98)	N _{168}	(Austria) Eva Pinkelnig	(Germany) Katharina Schmid	(Slovenia) Nika Prevc	(Germany) Katharina Schmid	
243	10	18 January 2025	(Japan) Sapporo (Ōkurayama HS137)	L _{074}	(Canada) Alexandria Loutitt	(Austria) Lisa Eder	(Norway) Eirin Maria Kvandal	(Germany) Katharina Schmid	
244	11	19 January 2025	(Japan) Sapporo (Ōkurayama HS137)	L _{075}	(Norway) Eirin Maria Kvandal	(Germany) Selina Freitag	(Norway) Thea Minyan Bjørseth	(Germany) Katharina Schmid	
245	12	24 January 2025	(Japan) Zaō (Yamagata HS102)	N _{169}	(Slovenia) Nika Prevc	(Norway) Thea Minyan Bjørseth	(Austria) Eva Pinkelnig	(Slovenia) Nika Prevc	
246	13	26 January 2025	(Japan) Zaō (Yamagata HS102)	N _{170}	(Austria) Jacqueline Seifriedsberger	(Norway) Eirin Maria Kvandal	(Slovenia) Nika Prevc	(Slovenia) Nika Prevc	
247	14	1 February 2025	(Germany) Willingen (Mühlenkopf HS147)	L _{076}	(Norway) Eirin Maria Kvandal	(Norway) Anna Odine Strøm	(Austria) Jacqueline Seifriedsberger	(Slovenia) Nika Prevc	
248	15	(Note: Individual women's event in Lake Placid (7 February) was interrupted due to strong winds after 14 jumpers and later restarted from the beginning.)7 February 2025	(United States) Lake Placid (MacKenzie Int. HS128)	L _{077}	(Slovenia) Nika Prevc	(Norway) Eirin Maria Kvandal	(Canada) Alexandria Loutitt	(Slovenia) Nika Prevc	
249	16	8 February 2025	(United States) Lake Placid (MacKenzie Int. HS128)	L _{078}	(Slovenia) Nika Prevc	(Germany) Agnes Reisch	(Germany) Selina Freitag	(Slovenia) Nika Prevc	
250	17	15 February 2025	(Slovenia) Ljubno (Savina HS94)	N _{171}	(Slovenia) Nika Prevc	(Germany) Selina Freitag	(Norway) Thea Minyan Bjørseth	(Slovenia) Nika Prevc	
251	18	16 February 2025	(Slovenia) Ljubno (Savina HS94)	N _{172}	(Slovenia) Nika Prevc	(Germany) Selina Freitag	(Austria) Lisa Eder	(Slovenia) Nika Prevc	
252	19	22 February 2025	(Austria) Hinzenbach (Aigner-Schanze HS90)	N _{173}	(Slovenia) Nika Prevc	(Germany) Selina Freitag	(Austria) Jacqueline Seifriedsberger	(Slovenia) Nika Prevc	
253	20	23 February 2025	(Austria) Hinzenbach (Aigner-Schanze HS90)	N _{174}	(Slovenia) Nika Prevc	(Germany) Selina Freitag	(Canada) Abigail Strate	(Slovenia) Nika Prevc	
FIS Nordic World Ski Championships 2025 (27 February – 7 March • Trondheim, Norway)
prologue		13 March 2025	(Norway) Oslo (Holmenkollen HS134)	L _{Qro}	cancelled due to strong wind			—	
254	21	13 March 2025	(Norway) Oslo (Holmenkollen HS134)	L _{079}	(Slovenia) Nika Prevc	(Norway) Anna Odine Strøm	(Norway) Eirin Maria Kvandal	(Slovenia) Nika Prevc	
255	22	(Note: Ind. women's event in Vikersund (15 March) interrupted before last jumper in 1st round due to strong wind. And rescheduled on later with one round only.)15 March 2025	(Norway) Vikersund (Vikersundbakken HS240)	F _{002}	(Slovenia) Nika Prevc	(Slovenia) Ema Klinec	(Germany) Selina Freitag	(Slovenia) Nika Prevc	
		16 March 2025	(Norway) Vikersund (Vikersundbakken HS240)	F _{cnx}	cancelled due to strong wind			—	
5th Raw Air Women's Overall (13 – 16 March 2025)					(Slovenia) Nika Prevc	(Norway) Eirin Maria Kvandal	(Norway) Anna Odine Strøm	Raw Air	
256	23	20 March 2025	(Finland) Lahti (Salpausselkä HS130)	L _{080}	(Slovenia) Nika Prevc	(Germany) Selina Freitag	(Canada) Alexandria Loutitt	(Slovenia) Nika Prevc	
257	24	21 March 2025	(Finland) Lahti (Salpausselkä HS130)	L _{081}	(Slovenia) Nika Prevc	(Germany) Selina Freitag	(Slovenia) Ema Klinec	(Slovenia) Nika Prevc	
14th FIS World Cup Women's Overall (23 November 2024 – 21 March 2025)					(Slovenia) Nika Prevc	(Germany) Selina Freitag	(Germany) Katharina Schmid	World Cup Overall	

=== Standings ===
==== Overall ====
Rank	after 24 events	Points
	(Slovenia) Nika Prevc	1933
2	(Germany) Selina Freitag	1293
3	(Germany) Katharina Schmid	1201
4	(Norway) Eirin Maria Kvandal	1026
5	(Austria) J. Seifriedsberger	978
6	(Austria) Lisa Eder	877
7	(Austria) Eva Pinkelnig	819
8	(Norway) Anna Odine Strøm	801
9	(Slovenia) Ema Klinec	710
10	(Canada) Alexandria Loutitt	681

==== Nations Cup ====
Rank	after 28 events	Points
	Germany	4241
2	Norway	3719
3	Austria	3624
4	Slovenia	3291
5	Japan	2314
6	Canada	1280
7	Italy	688
8	Finland	555
9	United States	382
10	France	328

==== Prize money ====
Rank	after 30 payouts	CHF
1	(Slovenia) Nika Prevc	129 569
2	(Norway) Eirin Maria Kvandal	88 528
3	(Germany) Selina Freitag	84 305
4	(Germany) Katharina Schmid	68 863
5	(Austria) J. Seifriedsberger	54 133
6	(Austria) Lisa Eder	51 596
7	(Norway) Thea Minyan Bjørseth	47 721
8	(Norway) Anna Odine Strøm	44 713
9	(Austria) Eva Pinkelnig	41 939
10	(Slovenia) Ema Klinec	39 751

==== Two Nights Tournament ====
Rank	after 2 events	Points
1	(Slovenia) Nika Prevc	587.7
2	(Norway) Eirin Maria Kvandal	568.7
3	(Germany) Katharina Schmid	547.8
4	(Germany) Selina Freitag	544.4
5	(Norway) Anna Odine Strøm	543.6
6	(Slovenia) Ema Klinec	535.1
7	(Germany) Agnes Reisch	533.5
8	(Austria) Eva Pinkelnig	528.6
9	(Austria) Lisa Eder	524.8
10	(Austria) J. Seifriedsberger	521.8

==== Raw Air ====
Rank	after 2 events	Points
1	(Slovenia) Nika Prevc	455.2
2	(Norway) Eirin Maria Kvandal	371.3
3	(Norway) Anna Odine Strøm	357.2
4	(Austria) J. Seifriedsberger	355.7
5	(Germany) Selina Freitag	353.2
6	(Canada) Alexandria Loutitt	346.4
7	(Slovenia) Ema Klinec	340.4
8	(Japan) Yūki Itō	328.8
9	(Austria) Lisa Eder	311.1
10	(Japan) Nozomi Maruyama	301.9

== Team events ==
Team events in the World Cup history

Total	F	L	N	Winners	Competition
10	—	7	3	5	Mixed team
7	1	5	1	4	Men's super team
124	28	94	2	7	Men's team
3	—	—	3	3	Women's super team

after final Team F event in Planica (29 March 2025)

=== Calendar ===
Event key: F – flying hill, L – large hill, N – normal hill
All	No.	Date	Place (Hill)	Size	Winner	Second	Third	R.
Mixed team
8	1	22 November 2024	(Norway) Lillehammer (Lysgårdsbakken HS140)	L _{005}	Germany: 1. Selina Freitag; 2. Andreas Wellinger; 3. Katharina Schmid; 4. Pius Paschke	Norway: 1. Anna Odine Strøm; 2. Kristoffer Eriksen Sundal; 3. Eirin Maria Kvandal; 4. Marius Lindvik	Austria: 1. Lisa Eder; 2. Daniel Tschofenig; 3. Eva Pinkelnig; 4. Jan Hörl	
9	2	31 January 2025	(Germany) Willingen (Mühlenkopf HS147)	L _{006}	Norway: 1. Thea Minyan Bjørseth; 2. Kristoffer Eriksen Sundal; 3. Eirin Maria Kvandal; 4. Johann André Forfang	Austria: 1. Lisa Eder; 2. Jan Hörl; 3. Jacqueline Seifriedsberger; 4. Daniel Tschofenig	Germany: 1. Katharina Schmid; 2. Philipp Raimund; 3. Selina Freitag; 4. Andreas Wellinger	
10	3	8 February 2025	(United States) Lake Placid (MacKenzie Int. HS128)	L _{007}	Germany: 1. Agnes Reisch; 2. Philipp Raimund; 3. Selina Freitag; 4. Andreas Wellinger	Norway: 1. Thea Minyan Bjørseth; 2. Kristoffer Eriksen Sundal; 3. Eirin Maria Kvandal; 4. Johann André Forfang	Austria: 1. Lisa Eder; 2. Jan Hörl; 3. Jacqueline Seifriedsberger; 4. Daniel Tschofenig	
Men's super team
6	1	13 December 2024	(Germany) Titisee-Neustadt (Hochfirstschanze HS142)	L _{004}	Germany: 1. Andreas Wellinger; 2. Pius Paschke	Austria: 1. Daniel Tschofenig; 2. Jan Hörl	Norway: 1. Halvor Egner Granerud; 2. Kristoffer Eriksen Sundal	
7	2	23 March 2025	(Finland) Lahti (Salpausselkä HS130)	L _{005}	Slovenia: 1. Lovro Kos; 2. Anže Lanišek	Austria: 1. Manuel Fettner; 2. Stefan Kraft	Japan: 1. Ren Nikaidō; 2. Ryōyū Kobayashi	
Men's team
123	1	18 January 2025	(Poland) Zakopane (Wielka Krokiew HS140)	L _{094}	Austria: 1. Jan Hörl; 2. Maximilian Ortner; 3. Stefan Kraft; 4. Daniel Tschofenig	Slovenia: 1. Lovro Kos; 2. Timi Zajc; 3. Domen Prevc; 4. Anže Lanišek	Norway: 1. Kristoffer Eriksen Sundal; 2. Benjamin Østvold; 3. Halvor Egner Granerud; 4. Johann André Forfang	
124	2	29 March 2025	(Slovenia) Planica (Letalnica b. Gorišek HS240)	F _{028}	Austria: 1. Daniel Tschofenig; 2. Manuel Fettner; 3. Jan Hörl; 4. Stefan Kraft	Germany: 1. Karl Geiger; 2. Andreas Wellinger; 3. Pius Paschke; 4. Markus Eisenbichler	Slovenia: 1. Lovro Kos; 2. Domen Prevc; 3. Timi Zajc; 4. Anže Lanišek	
Women's super team
3	1	25 January 2025	(Japan) Zaō (Yamagata HS102)	N _{003}	Germany: 1. Selina Freitag; 2. Agnes Reisch	Norway: 1. Thea Minyan Bjørseth; 2. Eirin Maria Kvandal	Austria: 1. Jacqueline Seifriedsberger; 2. Eva Pinkelnig	

== Podium table by nation ==
Table showing the World Cup podium places (gold–1st place, silver–2nd place, bronze–3rd place) by the countries represented by the athletes.

Rank	Nation	Gold	Silver	Bronze	Total
1	Slovenia	22	8	9	39
2	Austria	16	19	26	61
3	Germany	15	15	8	38
4	Norway	4	16	10	30
5	Japan	3	0	3	6
6	Canada	1	0	3	4
7	Switzerland	0	3	1	4
8	Poland	0	0	1	1
Totals (8 entries)		61	61	61	183

== Points distribution ==
The table shows the number of points won in the 2024–25 FIS Ski Jumping World Cup for men and women.

Place	1	2	3	4	5	6	7	8	9	10	11	12	13	14	15	16	17	18	19	20	21	22	23	24	25	26	27	28	29	30
Individual	100	80	60	50	45	40	36	32	29	26	24	22	20	18	16	15	14	13	12	11	10	9	8	7	6	5	4	3	2	1
M + W + Mixed Team	400	350	300	250	200	150	100	50	points not awarded
Super Team	200	160	120	100	80	70	60	50	40	30	20	10	points not awarded

== Qualifications ==
In case the number of participating athletes is 50 (men) / 40 (women) or lower, a Prologue competition round must be organized.

=== Men ===
No.	Place	Qualifications	Competition	Size	Winner	R.
1	(Norway) Lillehammer	23 November 2024		L	(Austria) Jan Hörl	
2	(Norway) Lillehammer	24 November 2024		L	(Austria) Jan Hörl	
3	(Finland) Ruka	30 November 2024		L	(Slovenia) Timi Zajc	
4	(Finland) Ruka	1 December 2024		L	(Germany) Pius Paschke	
5	(Poland) Wisła	6 December 2024	7 December 2024	L	(Austria) Daniel Tschofenig	
6	(Poland) Wisła	8 December 2024		L	(Germany) Pius Paschke	
7	(Germany) Titisee-Neustadt	14 December 2024		L	(Switzerland) Gregor Deschwanden	
8	(Germany) Titisee-Neustadt	15 December 2024		L	(Austria) Michael Hayböck	
9	(Switzerland) Engelberg	20 December 2024	21 December 2024	L	(Austria) Daniel Tschofenig	
10	(Switzerland) Engelberg	22 December 2024		L	(Austria) Maximilian Ortner	
11	(Germany) Oberstdorf	28 December 2024	29 December 2024	L	(Austria) Daniel Tschofenig	
12	(Germany) Garmisch-Partenkirchen	31 December 2024	1 January 2025	L	(Austria) Jan Hörl	
13	(Austria) Innsbruck	3 January 2025	4 January 2025	L	(Austria) Jan Hörl	
14	(Austria) Bischofshofen	5 January 2025	6 January 2025	L	(Austria) Stefan Kraft	
15	(Poland) Zakopane	17 January 2025	19 January 2025	L	(Austria) Daniel Tschofenig	
16	(Germany) Oberstdorf	24 January 2025	25 January 2025	F	(Norway) Johann André Forfang	
17	(Germany) Oberstdorf	26 January 2025		F	(Slovenia) Timi Zajc	
18	(Germany) Willingen	1 February 2025		L	(Slovenia) Anže Lanišek	
19	(Germany) Willingen	2 February 2025		L	(Slovenia) Anže Lanišek	
20	(United States) Lake Placid	7 February 2025	8 February 2025	L	(Slovenia) Domen Prevc	
21	(United States) Lake Placid	9 February 2025		L	(Slovenia) Domen Prevc	
22	(Japan) Sapporo	14 February 2025	15 February 2025	L	(Austria) Stefan Kraft	
23	(Japan) Sapporo	16 February 2025		L	(Slovenia) Domen Prevc	
24	(Norway) Oslo	13 March 2025		L	(Germany) Karl Geiger	
25	(Norway) Vikersund	14 March 2025	15 March 2025	F	(Slovenia) Domen Prevc	
	(Norway) Vikersund	16 March 2025		F	cancelled due to strong wind; all 53 athletes at start	
26	(Finland) Lahti	22 March 2025		L	(Austria) Jan Hörl	
27	(Slovenia) Planica	27 March 2025	28 March 2025	F	(Germany) Andreas Wellinger	

=== Women ===
No.	Place	Qualifications	Competition	Size	Winner	R.
1	(Norway) Lillehammer	23 November 2024		L	(Canada) Alexandria Loutitt	
2	(Norway) Lillehammer	24 November 2024		L	(Germany) Selina Freitag	
3	(China) Zhangjiakou	13 December 2024	14 December 2024	N	(Slovenia) Nika Prevc	
4	(China) Zhangjiakou	15 December 2024		N	(Austria) Jacqueline Seifriedsberger	
5	(Switzerland) Engelberg	21 December 2024		L	(Germany) Katharina Schmid	
	(Switzerland) Engelberg	22 December 2024		L	cancelled due to organizational changes caused by the bad weather forecast; all 55 athletes at start	
6	(Germany) Garmisch-Partenkirchen	30 December 2024	31 December 2024	L	(Germany) Selina Freitag	
7	(Germany) Oberstdorf	1 January 2025		L	(Germany) Katharina Schmid	
8	(Austria) Villach	5 January 2025		N	(Germany) Katharina Schmid	
9	(Austria) Villach	6 January 2025		N	(Germany) Katharina Schmid	
10	(Japan) Sapporo	18 January 2025		L	(Norway) Thea Minyan Bjørseth	
11	(Japan) Sapporo	19 January 2025		L	(Slovenia) Nika Prevc	
12	(Japan) Zaō	23 January 2025	24 January 2025	N	(Norway) Eirin Maria Kvandal	
13	(Japan) Zaō	26 January 2025		N	(Austria) Jacqueline Seifriedsberger	
	(Germany) Willingen	31 January 2025	1 February 2025	L	cancelled due to strong wind (re-categorized to prologue)	
14	(United States) Lake Placid	6 February 2025	7 February 2025	L	(Norway) Eirin Maria Kvandal	
15	(United States) Lake Placid	8 February 2025		L	(Norway) Eirin Maria Kvandal	
16	(Slovenia) Ljubno	14 February 2025	15 February 2025	N	(Slovenia) Nika Prevc	
17	(Slovenia) Ljubno	16 February 2025		N	(Slovenia) Nika Prevc	
18	(Austria) Hinzenbach	22 February 2025		N	(Germany) Selina Freitag	
19	(Austria) Hinzenbach	23 February 2025		N	(Germany) Selina Freitag	
	(Norway) Oslo	13 March 2025		L	cancelled due to strong wind; all 46 athletes at start	
20	(Finland) Lahti	20 March 2025		L	(Slovenia) Nika Prevc	

== Prize money distribution ==
The total prize money for each individual World Cup event is 86,100 Swiss franc (CHF) for men and 30,229 CHF for women. Men's qualification winners also received an additional 3,000 CHF on normal and large hills and 5,000 CHF on ski-flying hills.

=== Men ===
Rank	CHF
1st	13,000
2nd	10,000
3rd	8,000
4th	6,000
5th	5,200
6th	4,500
7th	3,600
8th	3,200
9th	2,900
10th	2,600
11th	2,400
12th	2,200
13th	2,100
14th	2,000
15th	1,900
16th	1,800
17th	1,700
18th	1,600
19th	1,500
20th	1,400
21st	1,300
22nd	1,200
23rd	1,100
24th	1,000
25th	900
26th	800
27th	700
28th	600
29th	500
30th	400

=== Women ===
Rank	CHF (ski flying)
1st	4,300 (10,000)
2nd	3,440 (8,000)
3rd	2,580 (6,000)
4th	2,150 (5,000)
5th	1,935 (4,500)
6th	1,720 (4,000)
7th	1,548 (3,600)
8th	1,376 (3,200)
9th	1,247 (2,900)
10th	1,118 (2,600)
11th	1,032 (2,400)
12th	946 (2,200)
13th	860 (2,000)
14th	774 (1,800)
15th	688 (1,600)
16th	645
17th	602
18th	559
19th	516
20th	473
21st	430
22nd	387
23rd	344
24th	301
25th	258

=== Team events ===
Rank	Men / Mixed	Super team	
Rank	Men / Mixed	Women	Men
1st	7,500	1,500	11,000
2nd	4,750	1,000	7,500
3rd	3,000	800	5,000
4th	2,000	700	4,000
5th	1,500	600	3,500
6th	1,000	500	3,000
7th	750	475	2,500
8th	500	425	2,000
9th	not awarded		1,250
10th	not awarded		1,000
11th	not awarded		750
12th	not awarded		500
Total	84,000 CHF	12,000 CHF	84,000 CHF

=== Tournaments ===
	Champion	Second	Third
Raw Air
Men & Women	40,000 CHF	13,000 CHF	6,000 CHF
Four Hills Tournament
Men	100,000 CHF	not awarded	
2-Nights-Tour
Women	10,000 EUR	5,000 EUR	3,000 EUR
Planica 7
Men	20,000 CHF	not awarded	

== Achievements ==
First World Cup career victory

Men

- (Austria) Daniel Tschofenig (22), in his 5th season – the WC 5 in Wisła

Women

First World Cup podium

Men

- (Austria) Maximilian Ortner (22), in his 2nd season – the WC 1 in Lillehammer – 3rd place
- (Poland) Paweł Wąsek (25), in his 8th season – the WC 27 in Lahti – 3rd place

Women

- (Germany) Agnes Reisch (25), in her 9th season – the WC 16 in Lake Placid – 2nd place
- (Norway) Thea Minyan Bjørseth (21), in her 6th season – the WC 5 in Engelberg – 3rd place

Number of wins this season (in brackets are all-time wins)

Men

- (Austria) Daniel Tschofenig – 8 (8)
- (Germany) Pius Paschke – 5 (6)
- (Japan) Ryōyū Kobayashi – 3 (35)
- (Slovenia) Domen Prevc – 3 (9)
- (Austria) Stefan Kraft – 2 (45)
- (Germany) Andreas Wellinger – 2 (9)
- (Slovenia) Anže Lanišek – 2 (8)
- (Austria) Jan Hörl – 2 (5)
- (Norway) Johann André Forfang – 1 (6)
- (Slovenia) Timi Zajc – 1 (5)

Women

- (Slovenia) Nika Prevc – 15 (22)
- (Germany) Katharina Schmid – 4 (19)
- (Norway) Eirin Maria Kvandal – 2 (6)
- (Austria) Eva Pinkelnig – 1 (16)
- (Austria) Jacqueline Seifriedsberger – 1 (3)
- (Canada) Alexandria Loutitt – 1 (2)

== Retirements ==
The following notable ski jumpers, who competed in the World Cup, retire during or after the 2024–25 season:

Men

- (Finland) Mico Ahonen
- (Italy) Andrea Campregher
- (Germany) Markus Eisenbichler
- (Austria) André Fussenegger
- (Austria) David Haagen
- (Austria) Michael Hayböck
- (Norway) Robert Johansson
- (United States) Casey Larson
- (Germany) Stephan Leyhe
- (Norway) Sondre Ringen
- (Austria) Ulrich Wohlgenannt

Women

- (Germany) Pauline Eichhorn
- (Austria) Marita Kramer
- (Slovenia) Urša Križnar
- (Austria) Vanessa Moharitsch
- (Austria) Jacqueline Seifriedsberger
- (France) Lilou Zepchi

== See also ==
- 2024 FIS Ski Jumping Grand Prix
- 2024–25 FIS Ski Jumping Continental Cup (men)
- 2024–25 FIS Ski Jumping Inter-Continental Cup
- 2024–25 FIS Cup (ski jumping)
