= 2024–25 FIS Ski Jumping Continental Cup =

Ski-jumping competition series

Winners
- Summer: (Austria) Clemens Aigner
- Winter: (Austria) Markus Müller
- Nations Cup Summer: Austria
- Nations Cup Winter: Austria

Competitions
- Venues: 4 (summer), 11 (winter)
- Individual: 8 (summer), 24 (winter)
- Cancelled: 2
- Rescheduled: 1

The 2024–25 FIS Ski Jumping Continental Cup, organized by the International Ski Federation (FIS), is the 34th (31st official) (Note: Last two seasons of Europa Cup in 1991/92 and 1992/93 are recognized as first two Continental Cup seasons by International Ski Federation, although Continental Cup under this name officially started first season in 1993/94 season.) Continental Cup winter season and the 23rd summer season for men as the second level of international ski jumping competitions.

The season started on 10 August 2024 in Hinterzarten, Germany and will conclude on 23 March 2025 in Zakopane, Poland.

Other competitive circuits this season included the World Cup, Grand Prix, Inter-Continental Cup, FIS Cup, Alpen Cup and New Star Trophy.

Pius Paschke from Germany and Maximilian Ortner from Austria are the defending overall champions from the previous season.

== Map of Continental Cup hosts ==
| Europe Location of all 14 Continental Cup hosts of the season (4 summer / 11 winter) | Asia United States |

== Men's Individual ==
Individual men's events in the Continental Cup history

| Total | F | L | N | Winners | Competition |
|---|---|---|---|---|---|
| 253 | — | 145 | 108 | | Summer |
| 1053 | 4 | 637 | 412 | | Winter |

after large hill event in Zakopane (23 March 2025)

=== Summer ===
N – normal hill / L – large hill
| All | No. | Date | Place (Hill) | Size | Winner | Second | Third | Overall | R. |
|---|---|---|---|---|---|---|---|---|---|
| 246 | 1 | 10 August 2024 | (Germany) Hinterzarten (Adler Ski Stadium HS109) | N _{107} | (Austria) Clemens Aigner | (Germany) Luca Roth | (Norway) Fredrik Villumstad | (Austria) Clemens Aigner | |
| 247 | 2 | 11 August 2024 | (Germany) Hinterzarten (Adler Ski Stadium HS109) | N _{108} | (Austria) Clemens Aigner | (Germany) Luca Roth | (Austria) Jonas Schuster | (Austria) Clemens Aigner | |
| 248 | 3 | 14 September 2024 | (Norway) Trondheim (Granåsen HS138) | L _{140} | (Austria) Manuel Fettner (Austria) Daniel Huber | | (Germany) Markus Eisenbichler | (Austria) Clemens Aigner | |
| 249 | 4 | 15 September 2024 | (Norway) Trondheim (Granåsen HS138) | L _{141} | (Austria) Manuel Fettner | (Austria) Daniel Huber | (Austria) Jonas Schuster | (Austria) Clemens Aigner | |
| 250 | 5 | 21 September 2024 | (Austria) Stams (Brunnentalschanze HS115) | L _{142} | (Austria) Clemens Aigner | (France) Valentin Foubert | (Germany) Luca Roth | (Austria) Clemens Aigner | |
| 251 | 6 | 22 September 2024 | (Austria) Stams (Brunnentalschanze HS115) | L _{143} | (Austria) Clemens Aigner | (France) Valentin Foubert | (Austria) Jonas Schuster | (Austria) Clemens Aigner | |
| 252 | 7 | 28 September 2024 | (Germany) Klingenthal (Vogtland Arena HS140) | L _{144} | (Norway) Fredrik Villumstad | (Germany) Constantin Schmid | (Slovenia) Domen Prevc | (Austria) Clemens Aigner | |
| 253 | 8 | 29 September 2024 | (Germany) Klingenthal (Vogtland Arena HS140) | L _{145} | (Austria) Manuel Fettner | (Slovenia) Domen Prevc | (Norway) Fredrik Villumstad | (Austria) Clemens Aigner | |
| 23rd FIS Summer Continental Cup Overall (10 August – 29 September 2024) | | | | | (Austria) Clemens Aigner | (Austria) Manuel Fettner | (Norway) Fredrik Villumstad | Summer Overall | |

==== Overall (Summer) ====
| Rank | after all 8 events | Points |
|---|---|---|
| | (Austria) Clemens Aigner | 543 |
| 2 | (Austria) Manuel Fettner | 405 |
| 3 | (Norway) Fredrik Villumstad | 377 |
| 4 | (Germany) Luca Roth | 349 |
| 5 | (Austria) Jonas Schuster | 316 |
| 6 | (Austria) Maximilian Ortner | 265 |
| 7 | (Germany) Constantin Schmid | 264 |
| 8 | (Austria) Daniel Huber | 238 |
| 9 | (Germany) Markus Eisenbichler | 206 |
| 10 | (France) Valentin Foubert | 174 |

==== Nations Cup (Summer) ====
| Rank | after all 8 events | Points |
|---|---|---|
| | Austria | 2295 |
| 2 | Germany | 1186 |
| 3 | Norway | 1023 |
| 4 | Slovenia | 398 |
| 5 | Poland | 305 |
| 6 | France | 282 |
| 7 | Finland | 72 |
| 8 | Japan | 71 |
| 9 | Switzerland | 44 |
| 10 | United States | 34 |

=== Winter ===
N – normal hill / L – large hill
| All | No. | Date | Place (Hill) | Size | Winner | Second | Third | Overall | R. |
|---|---|---|---|---|---|---|---|---|---|
| 1031 | 1 | 7 December 2024 | (China) Zhangjiakou (Snow Ruyi HS106) | N _{409} | (Norway) Benjamin Østvold | (Germany) Felix Hoffmann | (Norway) Sølve Jokerud Strand | (Norway) Benjamin Østvold | |
| 1032 | 2 | 8 December 2024 | (China) Zhangjiakou (Snow Ruyi HS106) | N _{410} | (Japan) Tomofumi Naitō | (Austria) Jonas Schuster | (Germany) Luca Roth | (Japan) Tomofumi Naitō | |
| 1033 | 3 | 14 December 2024 | (Finland) Ruka (Rukatunturi HS142) | L _{619} | (Austria) Markus Müller | (Austria) Hannes Landerer | (Germany) Felix Hoffmann | (Japan) Tomofumi Naitō | |
| 1034 | 4 | 15 December 2024 | (Finland) Ruka (Rukatunturi HS142) | L _{620} | (Norway) Robin Pedersen | (Austria) Markus Müller | (Norway) Benjamin Østvold | (Austria) Markus Müller | |
| 1035 | 5 | 27 December 2024 | (Switzerland) Engelberg (Gross-Titlis HS140) | L _{621} | (Germany) Felix Hoffmann | (Austria) Clemens Aigner | (Austria) Manuel Fettner | (Germany) Felix Hoffmann | |
| 1036 | 6 | 28 December 2024 | (Switzerland) Engelberg (Gross-Titlis HS140) | L _{622} | (Austria) Manuel Fettner | (Austria) Clemens Aigner | (Germany) Felix Hoffmann | (Germany) Felix Hoffmann | |
| | | 11 January 2025 | (Germany) Klingenthal (Vogtland Arena HS140) | L _{cnx} | cancelled due to strong wind, one competition moved to Iron Mountain | | | — | |
| | | 12 January 2025 | (Germany) Klingenthal (Vogtland Arena HS140) | L _{cnx} | cancelled due to strong wind, one competition moved to Iron Mountain | | | — | |
| 1037 | 7 | 18 January 2025 | (Austria) Bischofshofen (Paul-Ausserleitner HS142) | L _{623} | (Norway) Robin Pedersen | (Norway) Adrian Thon Gundersrud | (Norway) Robert Johansson | (Norway) Robin Pedersen | |
| 1038 | 8 | 19 January 2025 | (Austria) Bischofshofen (Paul-Ausserleitner HS142) | L _{624} | (Norway) Robin Pedersen | (Austria) Jonas Schuster | (Austria) Markus Müller | (Norway) Robin Pedersen | |
| 1039 | 9 | 25 January 2025 | (Japan) Sapporo (Ōkurayama HS137) | L _{625} | (Norway) Robin Pedersen | (Norway) Robert Johansson | (Norway) Fredrik Villumstad | (Norway) Robin Pedersen | |
| 1040 | 10 | 26 January 2025 | (Japan) Sapporo (Ōkurayama HS137) | L _{626} | (Norway) Robert Johansson | (Austria) Markus Müller | (Norway) Robin Pedersen | (Norway) Robin Pedersen | |
| 1041 | 11 | 26 January 2025 | (Japan) Sapporo (Ōkurayama HS137) | L _{627} | (Norway) Fredrik Villumstad | (Japan) Yukiya Satō | (Austria) Markus Müller | (Norway) Robin Pedersen | |
| 1042 | 12 | 1 February 2025 | (Norway) Lillehammer (Lysgårdsbakken HS140) | L _{628} | (Austria) Manuel Fettner | (Norway) Robert Johansson | (Poland) Maciej Kot | (Norway) Robin Pedersen | |
| 1043 | 13 | 2 February 2025 | (Norway) Lillehammer (Lysgårdsbakken HS140) | L _{629} | (Austria) Manuel Fettner | (Norway) Robert Johansson | (Norway) Fredrik Villumstad | (Norway) Robin Pedersen | |
| 1044 | 14 | 8 February 2025 | (Slovenia) Kranj (Bauhenk HS109) | N _{411} | (Slovenia) Žak Mogel | (Norway) Fredrik Villumstad | (Austria) Manuel Fettner | (Norway) Robin Pedersen | |
| 1045 | 15 | 9 February 2025 | (Slovenia) Kranj (Bauhenk HS109) | N _{412} | (Poland) Maciej Kot | (Austria) Manuel Fettner | (Norway) Fredrik Villumstad | (Norway) Robin Pedersen | |
| 1046 | 16 | (Note: One cancelled competition from Klingenthal was rescheduled to Iron Mountain on 21 February 2025)21 February 2025 | (United States) Iron Mountain (Pine Mountain HS133) | L _{630} | (Norway) Robert Johansson | (Austria) Markus Müller | (Germany) Markus Eisenbichler | (Norway) Robin Pedersen | |
| 1047 | 17 | 22 February 2025 | (United States) Iron Mountain (Pine Mountain HS133) | L _{631} | (Austria) Manuel Fettner | (Germany) Markus Eisenbichler | (Slovenia) Žak Mogel | (Austria) Markus Müller | |
| 1048 | 18 | 22 February 2025 | (United States) Iron Mountain (Pine Mountain HS133) | L _{632} | (Norway) Robert Johansson | (Austria) Manuel Fettner | (Germany) Markus Eisenbichler | (Austria) Manuel Fettner | |
| 1049 | 19 | 23 February 2025 | (United States) Iron Mountain (Pine Mountain HS133) | L _{633} | (Germany) Markus Eisenbichler | (Austria) Markus Müller | (Norway) Robert Johansson | (Norway) Robert Johansson | |
| 1050 | 20 | 15 March 2025 | (Finland) Lahti (Salpausselkä HS130) | L _{634} | (Finland) Kasperi Valto | (Austria) Markus Müller | (Austria) Jonas Schuster | (Austria) Markus Müller | |
| 1051 | 21 | 16 March 2025 | (Finland) Lahti (Salpausselkä HS130) | L _{635} | (Austria) Markus Müller | (Poland) Piotr Żyła | (Slovenia) Žiga Jelar | (Austria) Markus Müller | |
| 1052 | 22 | (Note: One round only due to strong wind)22 March 2025 | (Poland) Zakopane (Wielka Krokiew HS140) | L _{636} | (Germany) Markus Eisenbichler | (Slovenia) Žiga Jančar | (Slovenia) Rok Oblak | (Austria) Markus Müller | |
| 1053 | 23 | 23 March 2025 | (Poland) Zakopane (Wielka Krokiew HS140) | L _{637} | (Austria) Markus Müller | (Germany) Markus Eisenbichler | (Slovenia) Rok Oblak | (Austria) Markus Müller | |
| 34th FIS Continental Cup Overall (7 December 2024 – 23 March 2025) | | | | | (Austria) Markus Müller | (Austria) Jonas Schuster | (Norway) Robert Johansson | Winter Overall | |

==== Overall (Winter) ====
| Rank | after 23 events | Points |
|---|---|---|
| | (Austria) Markus Müller | 1001 |
| 2 | (Austria) Jonas Schuster | 909 |
| 3 | (Norway) Robert Johansson | 773 |
| 4 | (Austria) Manuel Fettner | 731 |
| 5 | (Poland) Maciej Kot | 672 |
| 6 | (Norway) Robin Pedersen | 657 |
| 7 | (Austria) Clemens Aigner | 647 |
| 8 | (Norway) Fredrik Villumstad | 616 |
| 9 | (Germany) Markus Eisenbichler | 614 |
| 10 | (Austria) Niklas Bachlinger | 515 |

==== Nations Cup (Winter) ====
| Rank | after 23 events | Points |
|---|---|---|
| | Austria | 5062 |
| 2 | Norway | 3333 |
| 3 | Germany | 2182 |
| 4 | Slovenia | 1949 |
| 5 | Poland | 1664 |
| 6 | Japan | 1214 |
| 7 | Switzerland | 406 |
| 8 | Finland | 258 |
| 8 | United States | 169 |
| 10 | Ukraine | 76 |

== Podium table by nation ==
Table showing the Continental Cup podium places (gold–1st place, silver–2nd place, bronze–3rd place) by the countries represented by the athletes.

| Rank | Nation | Gold | Silver | Bronze | Total |
|---|---|---|---|---|---|
| 1 | Austria | 14 | 13 | 8 | 35 |
| 2 | Norway | 10 | 5 | 10 | 25 |
| 3 | Germany | 3 | 5 | 7 | 15 |
| 4 | Slovenia | 1 | 2 | 4 | 7 |
| 5 | Poland | 1 | 1 | 1 | 3 |
| 6 | Japan | 1 | 1 | 0 | 2 |
| 7 | Finland | 1 | 0 | 0 | 1 |
| 8 | France | 0 | 2 | 0 | 2 |
| Totals (8 entries) | | 31 | 29 | 30 | 90 |
