= 2024–25 FIS Cup (ski jumping) =

20th FIS Cup season in ski jumping for men

Winners
- Men: (Austria) Julijan Smid
- Nations Cup: Austria

Competitions
- Venues: 14
- Individual: 28 (15 summer, 13 winter)
- Cancelled: 1

The 2024–25 FIS Cup (ski jumping), organized by the International Ski Federation (FIS), was the 20th FIS Cup season for men as the third level of international ski jumping competitions.

The season started on 9 August 2024 in Hinterzarten, Germany and concluded on 21 March 2025 in Zakopane, Poland. consisted of 28 competitions – 15 held in summer and 13 in winter.

Other competitive circuits that took place during the season included the World Cup, Grand Prix, Inter-Continental Cup, Continental Cup, Alpen Cup and New Star Trophy.

Stefan Rainer from Austria, the defending overall champion from the previous season, finished in third place. Julijan Smid also representing Austria became the new overall champion.

== Map of FIS Cup hosts ==
Europe

Location of all 13 FIS Cup hosts of the season

== Calendar ==
N – normal hill / L – large hill
No.	Date	Place (Hill)	Size	Winner	Second	Third	R.
1	9 August 2024	(Germany) Hinterzarten (Adler Ski Stadium HS109)	N	(Austria) Hannes Landerer	(Austria) Julijan Smid	(Austria) André Fussenegger	
2	10 August 2024	(Germany) Hinterzarten (Adler Ski Stadium HS109)	N	(Austria) Hannes Landerer	(Austria) Julijan Smid	(Germany) Simon Steinbeißer	
3	23 August 2024	(Czech Republic) Frenštát pod Radhoštěm (Areal Horečky HS106)	N	(Austria) Julijan Smid	(Austria) Janni Reisenauer	(Austria) Markus Müller	
4	24 August 2024	(Czech Republic) Frenštát pod Radhoštěm (Areal Horečky HS106)	N	(Austria) André Fussenegger	(Austria) Julijan Smid	(Austria) Ulrich Wohlgenannt	
5	31 August 2024	(Poland) Szczyrk (Skalite HS104)	N	(Austria) Niklas Bachlinger	(Poland) Szymon Byrski	(Germany) Emanuel Schmid	
6	1 September 2024	(Poland) Szczyrk (Skalite HS104)	N	(Austria) Raffael Zimmermann	(Austria) David Haagen	(Austria) Niklas Bachlinger	
7	7 September 2024	(Slovenia) Kranj (Bauhenk HS109)	N	(Austria) Julijan Smid	(Austria) Stefan Rainer	(Austria) Markus Müller	
8	8 September 2024	(Slovenia) Kranj (Bauhenk HS109)	N	(Austria) Stefan Rainer	(Austria) Julijan Smid	(Austria) Markus Müller	
9	14 September 2024	(Austria) Villach (Villacher Alpenarena HS98)	N	(Austria) Marco Wörgötter	(Austria) Ulrich Wohlgenannt	(Germany) Felix Hoffmann	
10	15 September 2024	(Austria) Villach (Villacher Alpenarena HS98)	N	(Austria) Ulrich Wohlgenannt	(Austria) Marco Wörgötter	(Poland) Kacper Tomasiak	
11	27 September 2024	(Switzerland) Einsiedeln (Schanzen Einsiedeln HS117)	L	(Austria) Ulrich Wohlgenannt	(Austria) Timon-Pascal Kahofer	(Austria) Stefan Rainer	
12	28 September 2024	(Switzerland) Einsiedeln (Schanzen Einsiedeln HS117)	L	(Austria) Stefan Rainer	(Austria) Ulrich Wohlgenannt	(Austria) Timon-Pascal Kahofer	
13	4 October 2024	(Estonia) Otepää (Tehvandi HS97)	N	(Germany) Martin Hamann	(Poland) Szymon Byrski	(Poland) Łukasz Łukaszczyk	
14	5 October 2024	(Estonia) Otepää (Tehvandi HS97)	N	(Germany) Martin Hamann	(Poland) Szymon Byrski	(Poland) Łukasz Łukaszczyk	
15	6 October 2024	(Estonia) Otepää (Tehvandi HS97)	N	(Austria) Niki Humml	(Poland) Łukasz Łukaszczyk	(Norway) Sebastian Østvold	
	7 December 2024	(Switzerland) Kandersteg (Nordic Arena HS106)	N	cancelled due to bad weather conditions			
16	8 December 2024	(Switzerland) Kandersteg (Nordic Arena HS106)	N	(Austria) Simon Steinberger	(Austria) Niklas Bachlinger	(Switzerland) Yannik Wasser	
17	13 December 2024	(Norway) Notodden (Tveitanbakken HS98)	N	(Austria) Simon Steinberger	(Austria) Niklas Bachlinger	(Slovenia) Rok Oblak	
18	14 December 2024	(Norway) Notodden (Tveitanbakken HS98)	N	(Austria) Niklas Bachlinger	(Austria) Simon Steinberger	(Austria) Clemens Leitner	
19	4 January 2025	(Sweden) Falun (Lugnet HS100)	N	(Austria) Clemens Leitner	(Austria) Julijan Smid	(Slovenia) Rok Oblak	
20	5 January 2025	(Sweden) Falun (Lugnet HS100)	N	(Austria) Julijan Smid	(Austria) Ulrich Wohlgenannt	(Austria) Niklas Bachlinger	
21	1 February 2025	(Poland) Szczyrk (Skalite HS104)	N	(Austria) Clemens Leitner	(Austria) Raffael Zimmermann	(Austria) Francisco Mörth	
22	2 February 2025	(Poland) Szczyrk (Skalite HS104)	N	(Austria) Ulrich Wohlgenannt	(Austria) Francisco Mörth	(Poland) Kacper Tomasiak	
23	8 February 2025	(Austria) Eisenerz (Note: Competitions relocated from Villach to Eisenerz) (Erzbergschanzen HS109)	N	(Austria) Raffael Zimmermann	(Austria) Francisco Mörth	(Austria) Ulrich Wohlgenannt (Austria) Louis Obersteiner	
24	9 February 2025	(Austria) Eisenerz (Erzbergschanzen HS109)	N	(Austria) Clemens Leitner	(Austria) Hannes Landerer	(Austria) Francisco Mörth	
2025 Nordic Junior World Ski Championships (12–15 February • Lake Placid, United States)
25	1 March 2025	(Germany) Oberhof (Kanzlersgrund HS100)	N	(Austria) Clemens Leitner	(Austria) Raffael Zimmermann	(Austria) Julijan Smid	
26	2 March 2025	(Germany) Oberhof (Kanzlersgrund HS100)	N	(Austria) Julijan Smid	(Austria) Stefan Rainer	(Austria) Clemens Leitner	
27	20 March 2025	(Poland) Zakopane (Wielka Krokiew HS140)	L	(Austria) Francisco Mörth	(Austria) Louis Obersteiner (Switzerland) Remo Imhof	N/A	
28	21 March 2025	(Poland) Zakopane (Wielka Krokiew HS140)	L	(Austria) Louis Obersteiner	(Slovenia) Žiga Jančar	(Slovenia) Rok Oblak	
20th FIS Cup Overall (9 August 2024 – 21 March 2025)				(Austria) Julijan Smid	(Austria) Ulrich Wohlgenannt	(Austria) Stefan Rainer	

== Overall leaders ==
Holder	Date	Place(s)	Number of competitions
(Austria) Hannes Landerer	9 August 2024 – 10 August 2024	(Germany) Hinterzarten	2
(Austria) Julijan Smid (1)	23 August 2024 – 13 December 2024	(Czech Republic) Frenštát – (Norway) Notodden	15
(Austria) Stefan Rainer	14 December 2024	(Norway) Notodden	1
(Austria) Julijan Smid (2)	4 January 2025 – 1 February 2025	(Sweden) Falun – (Poland) Szczyrk	3
(Austria) Ulrich Wohlgenannt	2 February 2025 – 1 March 2025	(Poland) Szczyrk – (Germany) Oberhof	4
(Austria) Julijan Smid (3)	2 March 2025 – 21 March 2025	(Germany) Oberhof – (Poland) Zakopane	3

== Standings ==
=== Individual ===
Rank	final standings after 28 events	Points
1	(Austria) Julijan Smid	932
2	(Austria) Ulrich Wohlgenannt	811
3	(Austria) Stefan Rainer	785
4	(Austria) Clemens Leitner	755
5	(Austria) Raffael Zimmermann	742
6	(Austria) Niklas Bachlinger	618
7	(Austria) Marco Wörgötter	578
8	(Austria) André Fussenegger	539
9	(Austria) Francisco Mörth	526
10	(Austria) Timon-Pascal Kahofer	492

=== Nations Cup ===
Rank	final standings after 28 events	Points
1	Austria	10858
2	Germany	2324
3	Poland	2285
4	Slovenia	1678
5	Norway	850
6	Switzerland	588
7	Finland	473
8	Estonia	269
9	Kazakhstan	255
10	France	154

== Podium table by nation ==
Table showing the FIS Cup podium places (gold–1st place, silver–2nd place, bronze–3rd place) by the countries represented by the athletes.

Rank	Nation	Gold	Silver	Bronze	Total
1	Austria	26	23	16	65
2	Germany	2	0	3	5
3	Poland	0	4	4	8
4	Slovenia	0	1	3	4
5	Switzerland	0	1	1	2
6	Norway	0	0	1	1
Totals (6 entries)		28	29	28	85
