= Gaojiaying =

Gaojiaying 高家营镇
- Town
- Gāojiāyíng Zhèn
- Location in Hebei Location in China
- Coordinates: 40°52′53″N 114°57′58″E
- Country: People's Republic of China
- Province: Hebei
- Prefecture-level city: Zhangjiakou
- District: Chongli

Area
  - Total: 351.0 km^{2} (135.5 sq mi)

Population (2010)
  - Total: 23,784
  - Density: 67.76/km^{2} (175.5/sq mi)
- Time zone: UTC+8 (China Standard)

Gaojiaying (Chinese: 高家营镇; pinyin: Gāojiāyíng Zhèn) is a town located in Chongli District, Zhangjiakou, Hebei, China. According to the 2010 census, Gaojiaying had a population of 23,784, including 12,137 males and 11,647 females. The population was distributed as follows: 3,933 people aged under 14, 17,345 people aged between 15 and 64, and 2,506 people aged over 65.

== See also ==
- List of township-level divisions of Hebei
