= Paweł Wąsek =

Polish ski jumper (born 1999)

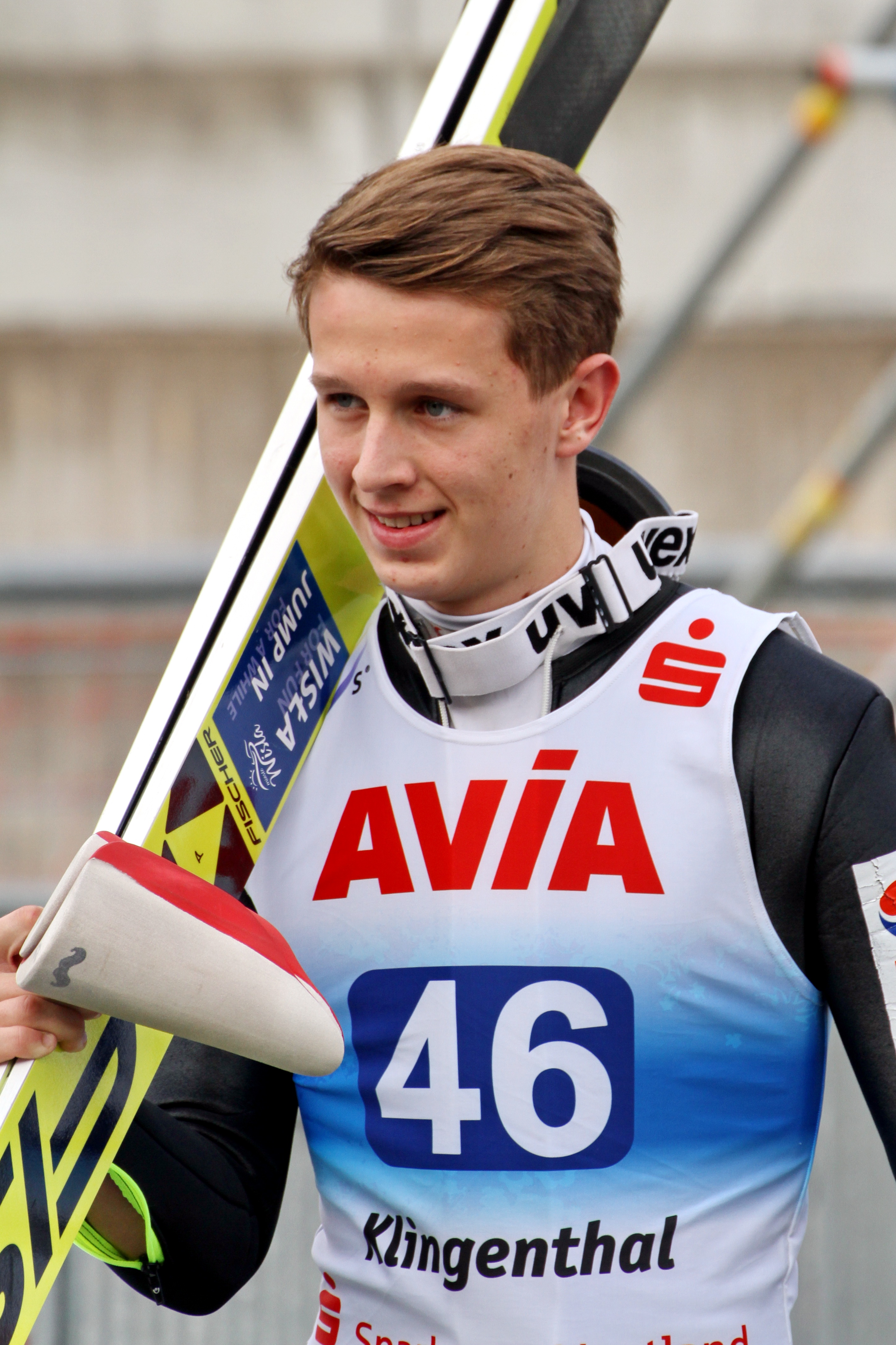
- Paweł Wąsek (2017)

Personal information
- Full name: Paweł Wąsek
- Nationality: Poland
- Born: 2 June 1999 (age 27) Cieszyn, Poland
- Height: 1.84 m (6 ft 0 in)

Sport
- Sport: Skiing
- Club: WSS Wisła

World Cup career
- Seasons: 2018–present

Achievements and titles
- Personal bests: 233.0 m (764.4 ft); Oberstdorf, 26 Jan 2025
Medal record
Men's ski jumping
Representing Poland
Olympic Games
Silver medal – second place	2026 Milano Cortina	Super team LH
- Updated on 17 February 2026

Paweł Wąsek (born 2 June 1999 in Cieszyn) is a Polish ski jumper representing the sports club WSS Wisła. Wąsek was an Olympic athlete competing in the 2022 Winter Olympics, as well as the 2026 Winter Olympics, where he won a silver medal in the men's super team.

== Career ==
Wąsek debuted in FIS Cup in September 2014 in Szczyrk at the age of 15 and took 67th place. He participated in the 2015 European Youth Olympic Winter Festival. He finished it with an individual 42nd place and 6th place in the team competition. On 3 September 2016, Paweł Wąsek took 2nd place in FIS Cup in the swiss Einsiedeln. This wasn't just his first podium but also his first points in FIS Cup. One week later, he debuted in the Summer Continental Cup in Lillehammer taking 20th place. During that summer season, Wąsek stood on the podium three times in FIS Cup; 3rd place in Hinterzarten and 2nd and 1st place in Râșnov. He took 7th individual place in Junior World Cup in 2017, 5th in the male team, and 7th in the mixed team competition. In February and March of the same year, Wąsek managed to regularly gain points in the FIS Ski Jumping Continental Cup and was the overall winner of the 2016-17 FIS Cup Wąsek debuted in the World Cup series on January 28, 2018 in Zakopane. He took 44th individual place. His best individual result was 3rd place in Lahti on 22 March 2025. Wąsek was an Olympic Athlete at the 2022 Winter Olympics in Beijing where he finished 21st in the individual large hill competition and 6th in the team large hill competition. Wąsek also competed at the 2026 Winter Olympics where he finished in the 35th place in the individual normal hill, 12th place in the individual large hill and won a silver medal in the men's super team

== World Cup ==
=== Season standings ===
Season	Overall	Ski-Flying	Four Hills Tournament	Raw Air	Willingen Five	Planica 7	Titisee-Neustadt Five
2017–18	NQ	—	—	—	—	—	—
2018–19	67	—	—	54	—	—	—
2019–20	NQ	—	—	61	—	—	—
2020–21	45	—	—	—	—	—	—
2021–22	43	25	48	17	—	—	—
2022–23	31	35	22	27	—	—	—
2023–24	47	—	—	—	—	—	—
2024–25	14	9	12	13	—	—	—
2025–26	28	—	—	—	—	—	—

=== Individual starts ===
Season	1	2	3	4	5	6	7	8	9	10	11	12	13	14	15	16	17	18	19	20	21	22	23	24	25	26	27	28	29	30	31	33	32	Points
2017/18	Wisła	Kuusamo	Nizhny Tagil	Nizhny Tagil	Titisee-Neustadt	Engelberg	Engelberg	Oberstdorf	Garmisch-Partenkirchen	Innsbruck	Bischofshofen	Tauplitz	Zakopane	Willingen	Willingen	Lahti	Oslo	Lillehammer	Trondheim	Vikersund	Planica	Planica												0
2017/18	q	—	—	—	—	—	—	—	—	—	—	—	44	—	—	—	—	—	—	—	—	—												0
2018/19	Wisła	Kuusamo	Kuusamo	Nizhny Tagil	Nizhny Tagil	Engelberg	Engelberg	Oberstdorf	Garmisch-Partenkirchen	Innsbruck	Bischofshofen	Predazzo	Predazzo	Zakopane	Sapporo	Sapporo	Oberstdorf	Oberstdorf	Oberstdorf	Lahti	Willingen	Willingen	Oslo	Lillehammer	Trondheim	Vikersund	Planica	Planica						4
2018/19	q	—	—	—	—	—	—	—	—	—	—	—	—	27	—	—	q	q	q	43	—	—	42	q	q	q	—	—						4
2019/20	Wisła HS134	Kuusamo HS142	Nizhny Tagil HS134	Nizhny Tagil HS134	Klingenthal HS140	Engelberg HS140	Engelberg HS140	Oberstdorf HS137	Garmisch-Partenkirchen HS142	Innsbruck HS130	Bischofshofen HS142	Predazzo HS104	Predazzo HS104	Titisee-Neustadt HS142	Titisee-Neustadt HS142	Zakopane HS140	Sapporo HS137	Sapporo HS137	Willingen HS145	Tauplitz HS235	Tauplitz HS235	Râșnov HS97	Râșnov HS97	Lahti HS130	Lahti HS130	Lillehammer HS140	Lillehammer HS140							0
2019/20	39	—	—	—	—	—	—	—	—	—	—	—	—	—	—	—	—	—	—	—	—	q	34	q	q	—	q							0
2020/21	Wisła HS134	Kuusamo HS142	Kuusamo HS142	Nizhny Tagil HS134	Nizhny Tagil HS134	Engelberg HS140	Engelberg HS140	Oberstdorf HS137	Garmisch-Partenkirchen HS142	Innsbruck HS130	Bischofshofen HS142	Titisee-Neustadt HS142	Titisee-Neustadt HS142	Zakopane HS140	Lahti HS130	Willingen HS145	Willingen HS145	TBD	TBD	TBD	TBD	Râșnov HS97	Oslo HS134	Lillehammer HS140	Trondheim HS138	Vikersund HS240	Planica HS240	Planica HS240						55
2020/21	48	22	25	32	6																													55
2021/22	Nizhny Tagil HS134	Nizhny Tagil HS134	Kuusamo HS142	Kuusamo HS142	Wisła HS134	Klingenthal HS140	Klingenthal HS140	Engelberg HS140	Engelberg HS140	Oberstdorf HS137	Garmisch-Partenkirchen HS142	Innsbruck HS130	Bischofshofen HS142	Bischofshofen HS142	Zakopane HS140	Sapporo HS137	Sapporo HS137	Sapporo HS137	Titisee-Neustadt HS142	Titisee-Neustadt HS142	Willingen HS145	Willingen HS145	Lahti HS130	Lahti HS130	Lillehammer HS140	Oslo HS134	Oslo HS134	Oberstdorf HS137	Oberstdorf HS137	Planica HS240	Planica HS240			61
2021/22	—	—	47	—	40	30	DQ	q	19	33	35	39	—	DQ	22	—	—	—	—	—	38	q	q	38	23	14	18	—	—	—	—			61
2022/23	Wisła HS134	Wisła HS134	Kuusamo HS142	Kuusamo HS142	Titisee-Neustadt HS142	Titisee-Neustadt HS142	Engelberg HS140	Engelberg HS140	Oberstdorf HS137	Garmisch-Partenkirchen HS142	Innsbruck HS130	Bischofshofen HS142	Zakopane HS140	Sapporo HS137	Sapporo HS137	Sapporo HS137	Bad Mittendorf HS235	Bad Mittendorf HS235	Willingen HS145	Lake Placid HS128	Lake Placid HS128	Râșnov HS97	Oslo HS134	Oslo HS134	Lillehammer HS140	Lillehammer HS140	Vikersund HS240	Vikersund HS240	Lahti HS130	Planica HS240	Planica HS240			190
2022/23	15	22	25	28	14	11	23	DQ	19	22	20	42	30	33	q	26	—	—	22	36	q	—	—	—	29	20	q	24	12	q	28			190
2023/24	Kuusamo HS142	Kuusamo HS142	Lillehammer HS140	Lillehammer HS140	Klingenthal HS140	Klingenthal HS140	Engelberg HS140	Engelberg HS140	Oberstdorf HS137	Garmisch-Partenkirchen HS142	Innsbruck HS130	Bischofshofen HS142	Wisła HS134	Szczyrk HS137	Zakopane HS104	Willingen HS145	Willingen HS145	Lake Placid HS128	Lake Placid HS128	Sapporo HS137	Sapporo HS137	Oberstdorf HS137	Oberstdorf HS137	Lahti HS130	Lahti HS130	Oslo HS134	Oslo HS134	Trondheim HS105/138	Trondheim HS105/138	Vikersund HS240	Vikersund HS240	Planica HS240	Planica HS240	42
2023/24	34	35	23	—	41	37	36	36	35	q	29	18	21	—	22	—	q	34	q	—	—	—	—	41	42	—	—	—	—	—	—	—	—	42
2024/25	Lillehammer HS140	Lillehammer HS140	Kuusamo HS142	Kuusamo HS142	Wisła HS134	Wisła HS134	Titisee-Neustadt HS142	Titisee-Neustadt HS142	Engelberg HS140	Engelberg HS140	Oberstdorf HS137	Garmisch-Partenkirchen HS142	Innsbruck HS130	Bischofshofen HS142	Zakopane HS104	Oberstdorf HS137	Oberstdorf HS137	Willingen HS145	Willingen HS145	Lake Placid HS128	Lake Placid HS128	Sapporo HS137	Sapporo HS137	Trondheim HS102	Trondheim HS138	Oslo HS134	Vikersund HS240	Vikersund HS240	Lahti HS130	Planica HS240	Planica HS240			612
2024/25	14	23	50	15	11	11	15	36	11	20	10	16	5	8	5	35	4	19	17	11	9	19	17	10	11	17	18	12	3	11	13			612
2025/26	Lillehammer HS140	Lillehammer HS140	Falun HS105	Falun HS105	Kuusamo HS142	Kuusamo HS142	Wisła HS134	Wisła HS134	Lake Placid HS128	Engelberg HS140	Engelberg HS140	Oberstdorf HS137	Garmisch-Partenkirchen HS142	Innsbruck HS130	Bischofshofen HS142	Zakopane HS104	Sapporo HS137	Sapporo HS137	Willingen HS145	Willingen HS145	Bad Mittendorf HS235	Bad Mittendorf HS235	Lahti HS130	Oslo HS134	Oslo HS134	Vikersund HS240	Vikersund HS240	Planica HS240	Planica HS240					3
2025/26	28																																	3

== Olympic results ==
Year	Age	Normal Hill	Large Hill	Team	Mixed Team
(Italy) Milano-Cortina 2026	26	35	14	2nd place, silver medalist(s)	11

== Personal life ==
His sister, Katarzyna Wąsek, is an Alpine skier.
