= Baiqi Township =

Baiqi Township 白旗乡
- Rural Township
- Báiqí Xiāng
- Location in Hebei Location in China
- Coordinates: 41°03′16″N 115°19′29″E
- Country: People's Republic of China
- Province: Hebei
- Prefecture-level city: Zhangjiakou
- District: Chongli

Area
  - Total: 161.3 km^{2} (62.3 sq mi)

Population (2010)
  - Total: 4,601
  - Density: 28.53/km^{2} (73.9/sq mi)
- Time zone: UTC+8 (China Standard)

Baiqi Township (Chinese: 白旗乡; pinyin: Báiqí Xiāng) is a rural township located in Chongli District, Zhangjiakou, Hebei, China. According to the 2010 census, Baiqi Township had a population of 4,601, including 2,374 males and 2,227 females. The population was distributed as follows: 533 people aged under 14, 3,379 people aged between 15 and 64, and 689 people aged over 65.

== See also ==
- List of township-level divisions of Hebei
