= Chongli, Zhangjiakou =

District in China

Chongli 崇礼区
- District
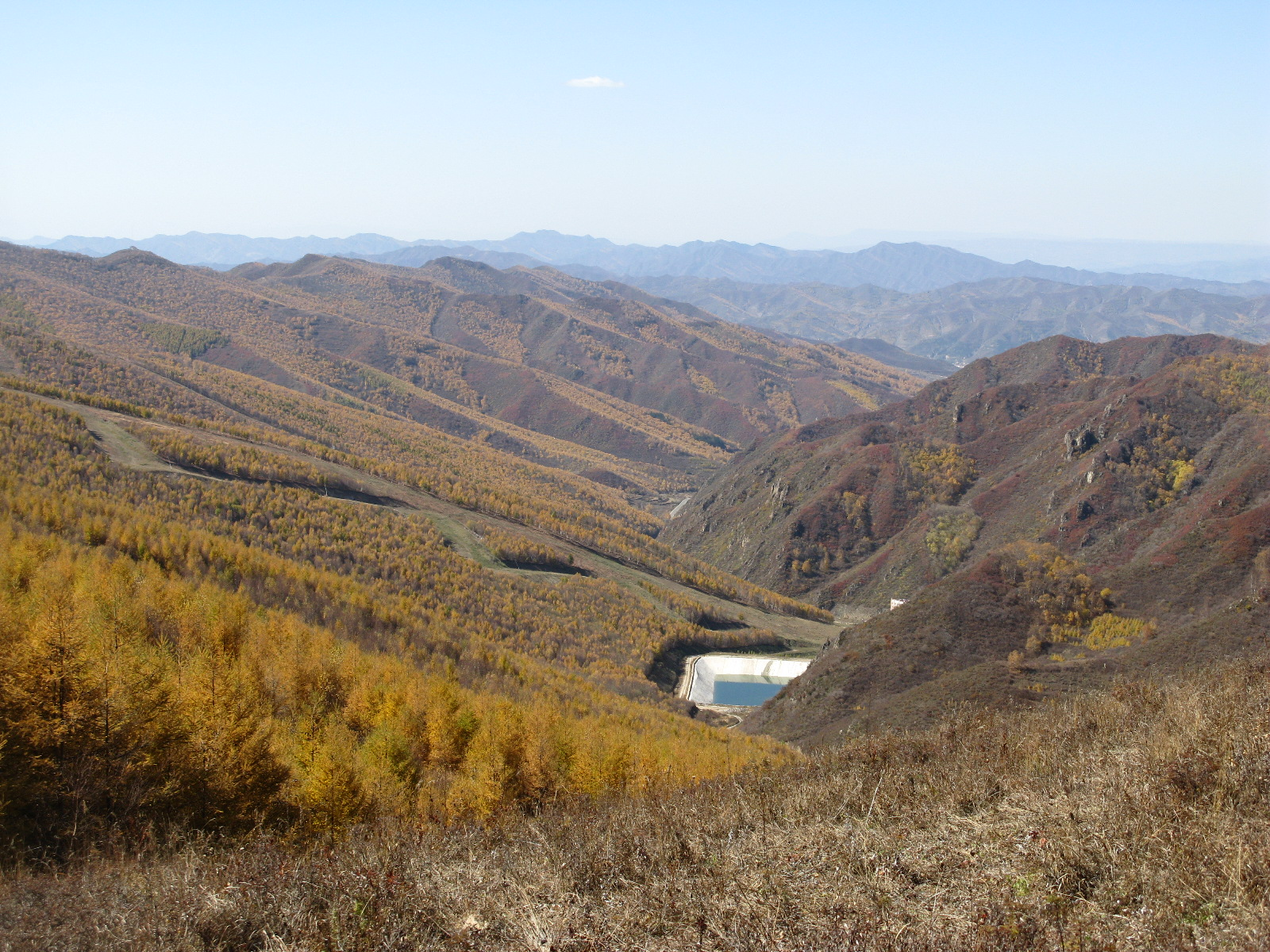
- Mountains in Chongli District

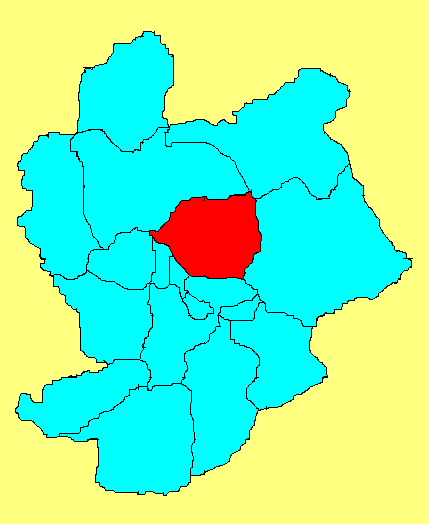
- Location in Zhangjiakou

- Location in Hebei
- Coordinates: 40.974°N 115.283°E
- Country: People's Republic of China
- Province: Hebei
- Prefecture-level city: Zhangjiakou

Area
  - Total: 2,350 km^{2} (910 sq mi)

Population (2020)
  - Total: 105,501
  - Density: 44.9/km^{2} (116/sq mi)
- Time zone: UTC+8 (China Standard)

Chongli, Zhangjiakou
- Simplified Chinese: 崇礼区
- Traditional Chinese: 崇禮區
Transcriptions
Standard Mandarin
- Hanyu Pinyin: Chónglǐ Qū
- IPA: [ʈʂʰʊ̌ŋ lì tɕʰý]

Chongli District (Chinese: 崇礼区; pinyin: Chónglǐ Qū; Mandarin pronunciation: [ʈʂʰʊ̌ŋ lì tɕʰý]) is a district of Zhangjiakou, Hebei province, China. By road, it is 241 kilometres (150 mi) from Beijing.

== 2022 Winter Olympics ==
Chongli District had been the stage of most of the skiing events during the 2022 Winter Olympics. The ski resort has earned over 1.54 billion yuan (237.77 million U.S. dollars) in tourism from the 2015-2016 snow season for a 31.6 percent growth over the previous season. In 2016 it was announced that Chongli has received 2.185 million tourists for an increase of 30 percent during the first snow season after the winning the Olympic bid. The snow season lasted for five months from November, during which Chongli has hosted 36 competitions and activities, such as Far East Cup and Children Skiing International Festival. A total of 23 skiing camps have also been set up, attracting the participation of 3,800 youths. All venue construction will start in November 2016 and will be finished by the end of 2022 to enable the city to hold test events.

== Transport ==
- Chongli railway station
- Taizicheng railway station

== Administrative Divisions ==
Towns:

- Xiwanzi (西湾子镇), Gaojiaying (高家营镇)

Townships:

- Sitaizui Township (四台嘴乡), Hongqiying Township (红旗营乡), Shiyaozi Township (石窑子乡), Yimatu Township (驿马图乡), Shizuizi Township (石嘴子乡), Shizigou Township (狮子沟乡), Qingsanying Township (清三营乡), Baiqi Township (白旗乡)

== Climate ==
Climate data for Chongli, elevation 1,240 m (4,070 ft), (1991–2020 normals, extremes 1981–present)
| Month | Jan | Feb | Mar | Apr | May | Jun | Jul | Aug | Sep | Oct | Nov | Dec | Year |
|---|---|---|---|---|---|---|---|---|---|---|---|---|---|
| Record high °C (°F) | 9.9 (49.8) | 15.3 (59.5) | 21.4 (70.5) | 29.2 (84.6) | 33.5 (92.3) | 35.0 (95.0) | 38.3 (100.9) | 33.3 (91.9) | 31.1 (88.0) | 24.9 (76.8) | 18.6 (65.5) | 11.4 (52.5) | 38.3 (100.9) |
| Mean daily maximum °C (°F) | −5.3 (22.5) | −0.9 (30.4) | 5.9 (42.6) | 14.2 (57.6) | 20.7 (69.3) | 24.8 (76.6) | 26.6 (79.9) | 25.3 (77.5) | 20.3 (68.5) | 12.9 (55.2) | 3.8 (38.8) | −3.7 (25.3) | 12.1 (53.7) |
| Daily mean °C (°F) | −13.9 (7.0) | −9.5 (14.9) | −1.8 (28.8) | 6.5 (43.7) | 13.2 (55.8) | 17.6 (63.7) | 19.9 (67.8) | 18.1 (64.6) | 12.4 (54.3) | 4.9 (40.8) | −4.2 (24.4) | −11.8 (10.8) | 4.3 (39.7) |
| Mean daily minimum °C (°F) | −20.0 (−4.0) | −16.0 (3.2) | −8.5 (16.7) | −1.1 (30.0) | 5.2 (41.4) | 10.4 (50.7) | 13.7 (56.7) | 12.0 (53.6) | 5.9 (42.6) | −1.1 (30.0) | −9.7 (14.5) | −17.3 (0.9) | −2.2 (28.0) |
| Record low °C (°F) | −35.8 (−32.4) | −31.3 (−24.3) | −27.7 (−17.9) | −12.5 (9.5) | −7.5 (18.5) | 0.4 (32.7) | 3.6 (38.5) | 1.8 (35.2) | −6.3 (20.7) | −14.6 (5.7) | −28.2 (−18.8) | −31.4 (−24.5) | −35.8 (−32.4) |
| Average precipitation mm (inches) | 4.0 (0.16) | 5.0 (0.20) | 11.7 (0.46) | 23.4 (0.92) | 46.0 (1.81) | 79.3 (3.12) | 113.0 (4.45) | 85.9 (3.38) | 60.9 (2.40) | 29.8 (1.17) | 12.0 (0.47) | 4.4 (0.17) | 475.4 (18.71) |
| Average precipitation days (≥ 0.1 mm) | 5.7 | 5.1 | 5.6 | 6.9 | 9.2 | 13.3 | 15.2 | 12.8 | 11.1 | 6.7 | 5.6 | 5.6 | 102.8 |
| Average snowy days | 7.7 | 7.0 | 6.7 | 3.9 | 0.6 | 0 | 0 | 0 | 0.3 | 2.4 | 6.6 | 7.9 | 43.1 |
| Average relative humidity (%) | 59 | 54 | 47 | 42 | 45 | 59 | 69 | 71 | 66 | 59 | 59 | 60 | 58 |
| Mean monthly sunshine hours | 191.1 | 193.7 | 233.7 | 246.6 | 271.2 | 253.1 | 246.1 | 243.3 | 226.7 | 220.3 | 180.6 | 171.7 | 2,678.1 |
| Percentage possible sunshine | 64 | 64 | 63 | 61 | 60 | 56 | 54 | 58 | 62 | 65 | 62 | 60 | 61 |
Source: China Meteorological Administrationall-time May high
