= Kamil Stoch =

Polish ski jumper (born 1987)

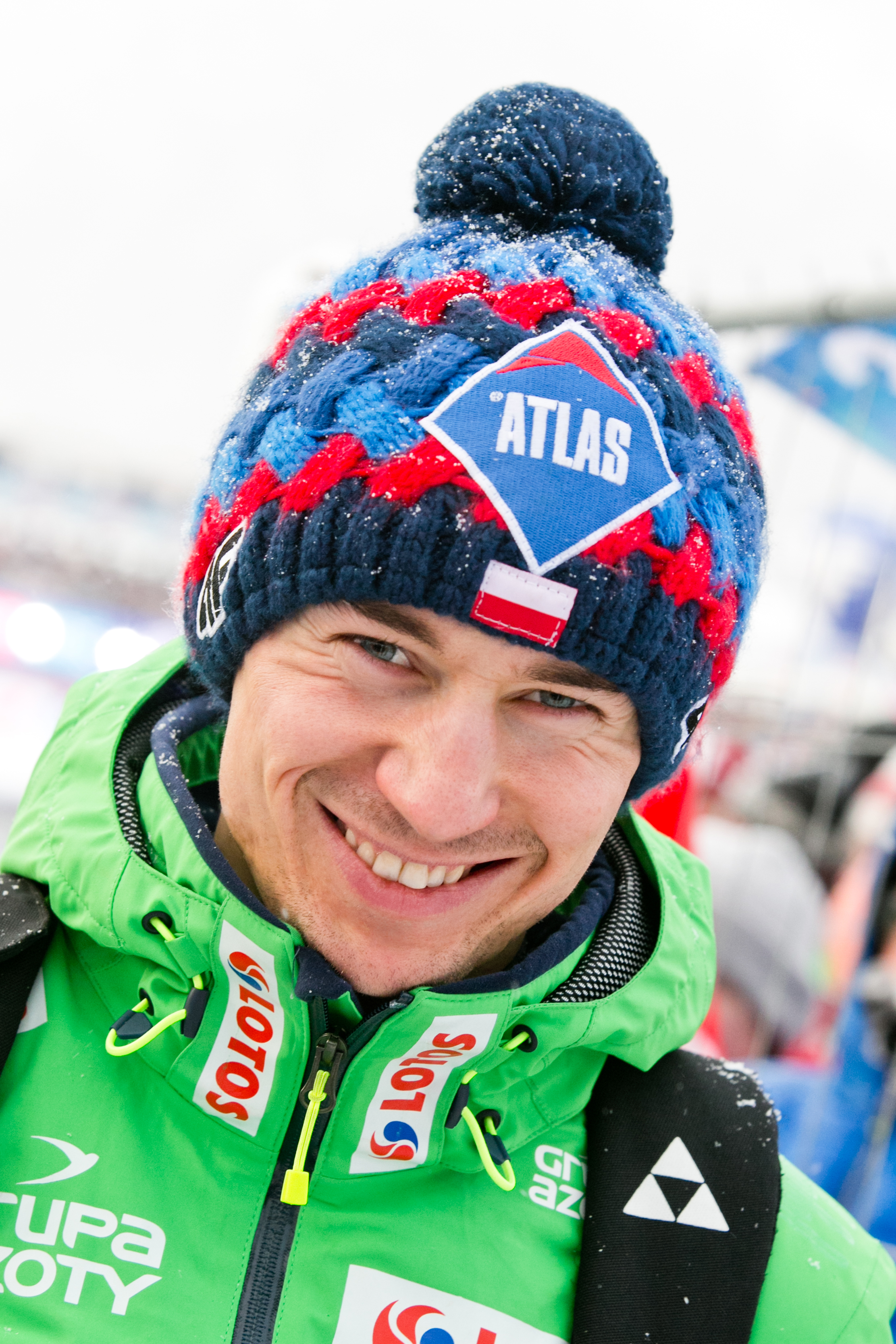
- Stoch in 2016

Personal information
- Full name: Kamil Wiktor Stoch
- Nationality: Poland
- Born: 25 May 1987 (age 39) Zakopane, Poland
- Height: 1.73 m (5 ft 8 in)

Sport
- Sport: Skiing
- Club: KS Eve-nement Zakopane

World Cup career
- Seasons: 2004–2026
- Indiv. starts: 484
- Indiv. podiums: 80
- Indiv. wins: 39
- Team starts: 82
- Team podiums: 31
- Team wins: 7
- Overall titles: 2 (2014, 2018)
- Four Hills titles: 3 (2017, 2018, 2021)
- Raw Air titles: 2 (2018, 2020)

Achievements and titles
- Personal bests: 251.5 m (825 ft); Planica, 25 March 2017
Medal record
Event	1st	2nd	3rd
Olympic Games	3	0	1
World Championships	2	1	3
Ski Flying World Championships	0	1	2
Total	5	2	6
Men's ski jumping
Olympic Games
Gold medal – first place	2014 Sochi	Individual NH
Gold medal – first place	2014 Sochi	Individual LH
Gold medal – first place	2018 Pyeongchang	Individual LH
Bronze medal – third place	2018 Pyeongchang	Team LH
World Championships
Gold medal – first place	2013 Val di Fiemme	Individual LH
Gold medal – first place	2017 Lahti	Team LH
Silver medal – second place	2019 Seefeld	Individual NH
Bronze medal – third place	2013 Val di Fiemme	Team LH
Bronze medal – third place	2015 Falun	Team LH
Bronze medal – third place	2021 Oberstdorf	Team LH
Ski flying
World Championships
Silver medal – second place	2018 Oberstdorf	Individual
Bronze medal – third place	2018 Oberstdorf	Team
Bronze medal – third place	2020 Planica	Team
- Updated on 30 March 2026

Kamil Wiktor Stoch (Polish pronunciation: [ˈkamil stɔx]; born 25 May 1987) is a Polish former ski jumper. He is one of the most successful ski jumpers in the history of the sport, having won two World Cup titles, three Four Hills Tournaments (two of them consecutively), three individual gold medals at the Winter Olympics, individual and team gold at the Ski Jumping World Championships, and individual silver at the Ski Flying World Championships. His other tournament wins include Raw Air (twice), the Willingen Five, and Planica7.

Stoch is among only three ski jumpers in history, alongside Sven Hannawald and Ryoyu Kobayashi, to win the "grand slam" of all four competitions in a single Four Hills Tournament. In 2018, at age 30, Stoch became the oldest individual Olympic gold medallist and World Cup titlist in the history of ski jumping. He was voted Polish Sports Personality of the Year in 2014 and 2017. Stoch retired at the end of the 2025-26 season.

== Personal life ==
Stoch was born in Zakopane and raised in nearby Ząb. He has two older sisters. In 2006, he graduated from the School of Sports Championships in Zakopane. In 2012, he graduated from the University School of Physical Education in Krakow with a master's degree in physical education (MPhEd). On 7 August 2010, he married Ewa Bilan.

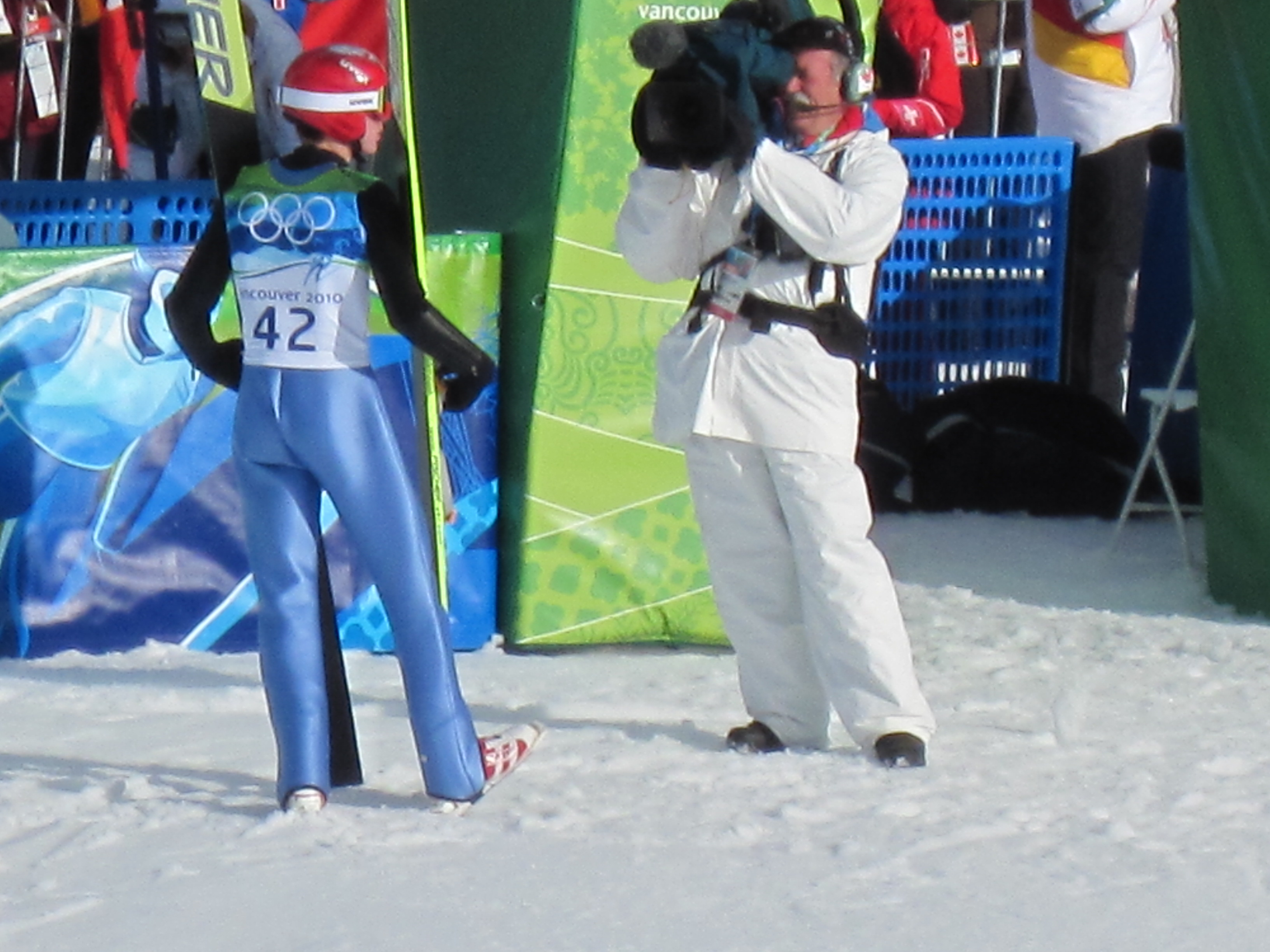
Kamil Stoch at Olympic Games 2010

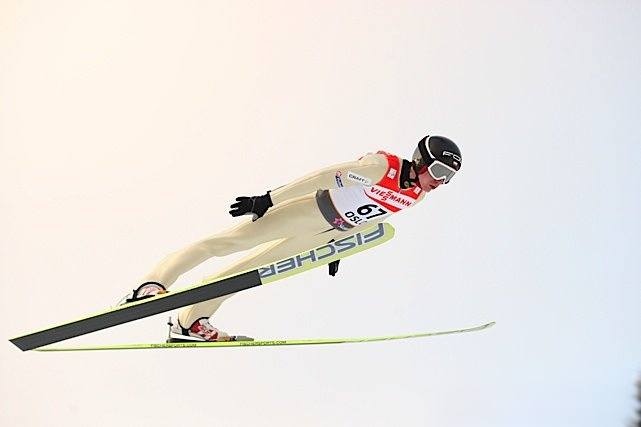
Training jump in Oslo, Norway, 2011

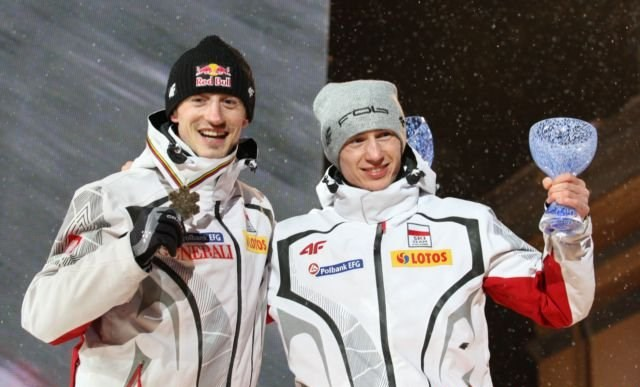
With Adam Małysz during the medal ceremony of the 2011 World Championships

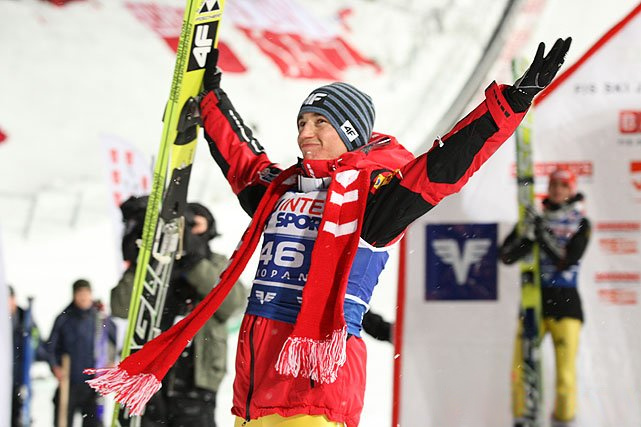
After winning competition of FIS Ski Jumping World Cup in Zakopane 2012

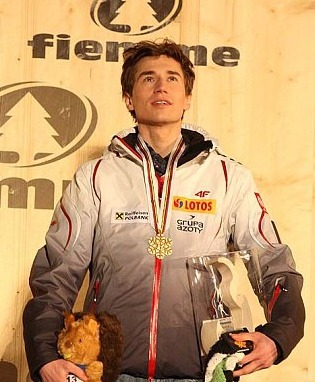
During medal ceremony with gold medal of World Championships 2013

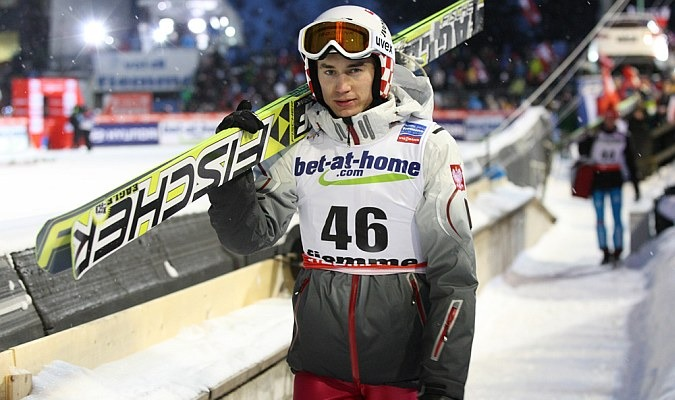
Kamil Stoch during normal hill competition at World Championships 2013 in Predazzo, Italy

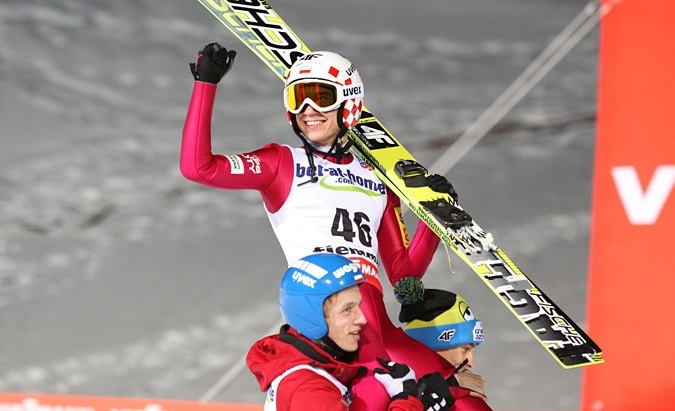
Stoch after winning World Champion 2013 title with teammates – Piotr Żyła and Dawid Kubacki

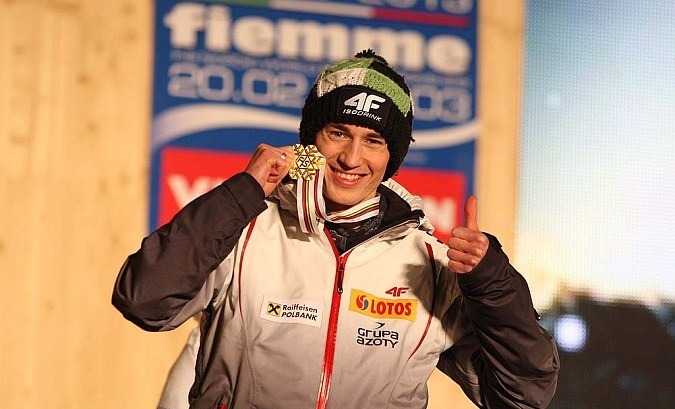
Medal ceremony – Stoch with gold medal of World Championships 2013

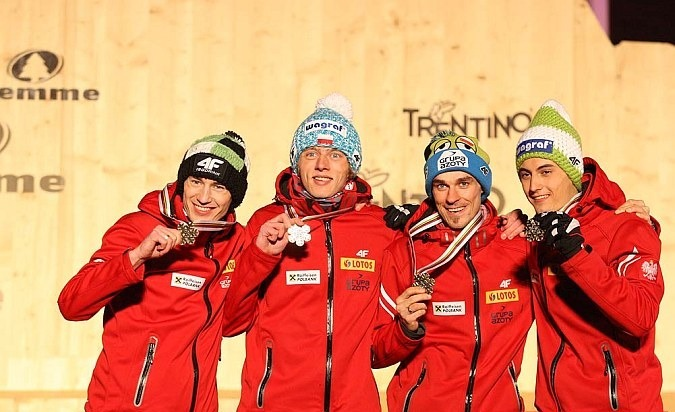
Receiving bronze medal of World Championships 2013 in team competition (with Maciej Kot, Dawid Kubacki, Piotr Żyła)

== Career ==
He was three years old when he first started skiing. A year later, he started ski jumping. When he was six years old, he received his first ski-jumping skis from his uncle. He joined the club ŁKS Ząb as an eight-year-old boy, where his first coach was Mirosław Małuda. He initially trained in the sport of Nordic combined.

At the 2006 Ski-flying World Championships in Kulm, Stoch finished 9th in the team event and 35th in the individual event. He competed at his first Olympics in 2006, in Turin, Italy. Having qualified for the finals in the normal hill and large hill, he finished 16th and 26th, respectively. He also qualified for the team competition (large hill), where Poland placed 5th.

Stoch won the Polish Championship in 2007. At the 2007 FIS Nordic World Ski Championships in Sapporo, Stoch finished 5th in the team large hill and 11th in the individual normal hill. He also won a World Cup Summer Grand Prix competition in Oberhof in 2007.

In 2008, Stoch was 6th in the individual world cup in Val di Fiemme. In 2009, he was 4th in individual World Championship in Liberec on the normal hill.

=== 2009/2010 ===
At the 2010 Winter Olympics in Vancouver, British Columbia, Canada, the Polish ski jumping team was led by Adam Małysz (who would win the silver medal in both individual events). Stoch again qualified for the finals in all three events, finishing 27th in the Normal hill and 14th in the Large hill, while the Polish team placed sixth in the team competition. Stoch won a 2010 Summer World Cup competition in Wisła and 2011 World Cup events in Zakopane (rescheduled from Harrachov), Klingenthal, and Planica.

=== 2010/2011 ===
On 23 January 2011, on Wielka Krokiew in Zakopane, Poland, he won a World Cup competition for the first time in his career. It was his first time on the podium in this series. He became the fourth Polish ski jumper, after Stanisław Bobak, Piotr Fijas, and Adam Małysz, to win a World Cup competition.

A week later, the team competition, held annually in Willingen with jumps devoted to distance 139 m and 130 m, contributed to gaining third place for the Polish team. On 2 February 2011, he won second World Cup competition in Klingenthal, Germany. On 22 February 2011, he won the third title of Polish Champion in Szczyrk, where he jumped twice at 101.5 m. During World Cup in Lahti, Finland, he gained third place with the team again. The season 2010/2011 ended in Planica, Slovenia, where for the third time in the history of Polish ski jumping – two ski jumpers were on the podium together. On 20 March 2011, Stoch won third in his career World Cup competition, and Adam Małysz was third. A day earlier, during a trial run before the competition team, Stoch set his new personal record and landed at 226 m. The Polish national team was ranked third place in the Nations Cup. Stoch ended the season in 10th place in the general individual classification.

=== 2011/2012 ===
On 26 December 2011, Wisła Malinka, Poland, held Polish Championship. In the first series, Stoch jumped 123.5 m. In the second, he jumped 136 meters, which set a new record and also won him the gold medal.

On 20 January 2012 was held the first of two World Cup competitions in Zakopane. After the jump on a distance of 125.5 m in the first series held the second position. On the other hand, he jumped 135 m, the longest distance in the competition. The second series gave Stoch a fourth career victory, the second in Zakopane.

In the first competition in Predazzo, after the landings at 123.5 mi 126 m, peaked at 7th place, with a loss of 4.2 points to the podium. In both series, he jumped in adverse wind conditions. The next day of the competition on Trampolino dal Ben he jumped a distance of 125,5 mi 131.5 m, which gave him the victory before Gregor Schlierenzauer and Anders Bardal. This moved him up to fourth place in the overall standings, ahead of Thomas Morgenstern.

Season 2011/2012 graduated on the best in his career – fifth place in the overall World Cup with the acquis 1078 points and a loss of 247 points to the winner of the Crystal Ball – Anders Bardal. This season, Stoch was on the podium seven times – twice victorious, second twice and third three times. The classification of flights was sixth, which was also his best result. He lost 162 points to the best aviator season – Robert Kranjec, but he stood on the podium one contest flight – was third in Tauplitz.

=== 2012/2013 ===
On 25 January 2013, he became the joint holder of the Polish ski flying distance record (tying the mark held by Piotr Żyła) with a jump of 232.5 metres.

In the first competition in Val di Fiemme during the 2013 Ski Jumping World Championships, Stoch earned the highest score in the trial before the contest, jumping to 103 m in the first round competition, jumped a distance of 102 m and was ranked second place, losing 2.8 points to the leader – Anders Bardal. The second series reached 97 m, with a weak landing and fell to eighth place. Stoch, in post-competition interviews, stated that he is very unhappy with the obtained result – despite the relaxation made a mistake during the jump.

On 28 February 2013, achieved the title of World Champion 2013. In the first series of the competition, he showed the longest jump of 131.5 m and earned high marks for style, including the "20" from the Swiss judge. He was the leader after the first round. In the final series, like most of the top competitors, he competed with reduced at the request of the coach – the nineteenth beam. Stoch jumped 130 m, again without providing any judicial note below "19" and won the gold medal with 6.1 points more than Peter Prevc, but about 6.7 from the third Anders Jacobsen. Immediately after the competition, Stoch and Prevc were threatened with disqualification for image suits. This provision was to be introduced the day before; ultimately, the judges rejected the anonymous protest. Stoch won the gold a day later in Cavalese. He won the title of World Champion in Val di Fiemme – exactly ten years after winning the first title of World Champion by Adam Małysz. On 2 March 2013, Stoch participated in the team competition on the large hill, which was submitted to the fourth group of players. Before his first attempt, Poland was classified in fifth place. Makes a stroke on the 134-meter and, after the first round, Poland took fourth place, losing five points to the third Germans. The second started at the request of head coach Łukasz Kruczek, with a reduction of two positions beams and reached 130 meters. The Polish team, consisting of Stoch and his teammates Dawid Kubacki, Piotr Żyła and Maciej Kot, won a bronze medal in the team competition. The Polish team originally took fourth place, but after recounting the scores because of Thomas Morgenstern, who noticed a mistake in points and at the request of the Germans, they finished in third place (The Norwegian team was originally in front of the Polish team, but Anders Bardal's jump was badly counted).

In the overall World Cup season, the 2012/2013 Polish representative came in third. He scored 953 points but lost 667 points to the winner of the Crystal Ball – Gregor Schlierenzauer and 46 points to the second Anders Bardal. His advantage over fourth Severin Freund totaled 30 points. He won two World Cup competitions, five times on the podium.

=== 2013/2014 ===
At the 2014 Winter Olympics in Sochi, Russia, Stoch entered as a medal favorite. On 9 February 2014, after qualifying easily in the first competition on the normal hill, he then landed the longest jumps in both rounds of the finals to win the title of Olympic Champion. He won by 12.7 points, the fourth-largest margin of victory in a men's normal hill at the Winter Olympic Games. It was Poland's first Olympic ski jumping gold medal since Wojciech Fortuna won the large hill at the 1972 Olympics. While competing, he wore a helmet painted in military green in tribute to the Polish Air Force (with a red & white Polish Air Force checkerboard insignia on the left side of his helmet.). On 15 February 2014, Stoch won his second gold medal, this time on the large hill, becoming the third man in history to win both hills individual events in a single Olympics after Matti Nykänen in Calgary 1988 and Simon Ammann in Salt Lake City 2002 and Vancouver 2010. He jumped 139 m and 132.5 m. His advantage over the second-placed Japanese Noriaki Kasai was 1.3 points, and 3.9 points over the third-placed Slovene Peter Prevc.

In March 2014, he won the overall FIS World Cup classification. Season 2013/2014 ended with his six victories.

=== 2014/2015 ===
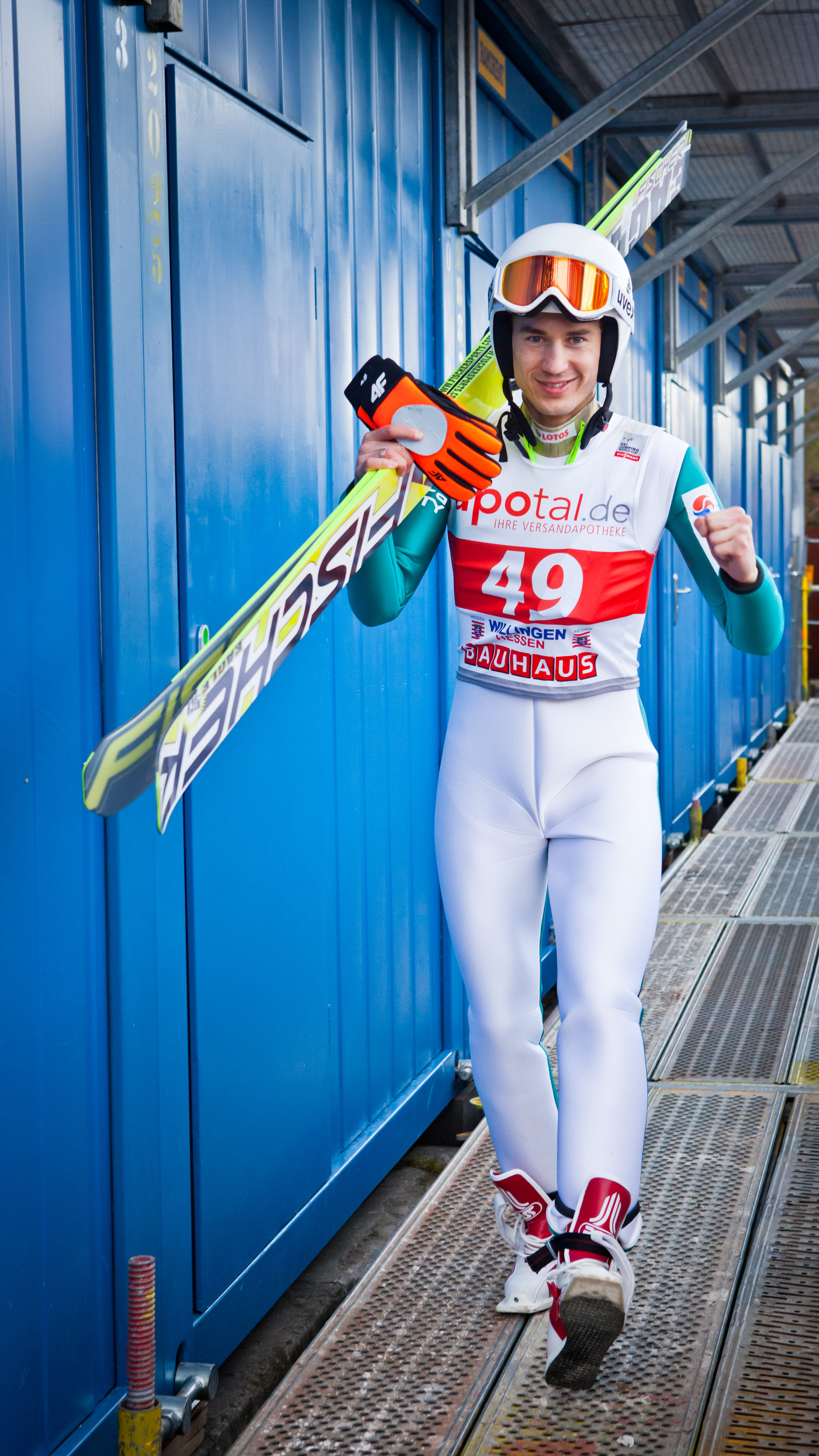
Stoch in 2014.

Kamil Stoch sustained an ankle injury before the FIS World Cup opening in Klingenthal, which prevented him from participating in the first competitions of the season. He resumed training before the Four Hills Tournament. He took 10th place at Four Hills Tournament. On 18 January 2015 won FIS World Cup in Zakopane at Wielka Krokiew. It was his first victory after serious injury. On 30 January 3015, won the 15th World Cup in career, this time in Willingen. In February 2015 took part in the World Championships. He was 17th in normal hill and 12th in large hill competition. On 28 February 2015 (exactly two years after winning the World Champion title by Stoch) Polish team in squad: Stoch, Piotr Żyła, Klemens Murańka and Jan Ziobro achieved the bronze medal of World Championships 2015 in the team event. For Stoch, it is his second bronze medal in the team event at the World Championships.

On 21 March 2015, set a new Polish record of ski flying with a jump of 238 metres at Letalnica, Planica during the trial round. He took 9th place in FIS World Cup general classification. Season 2014/2015 ended with two victories, two-second place, and one third place.

=== 2016/2017 ===
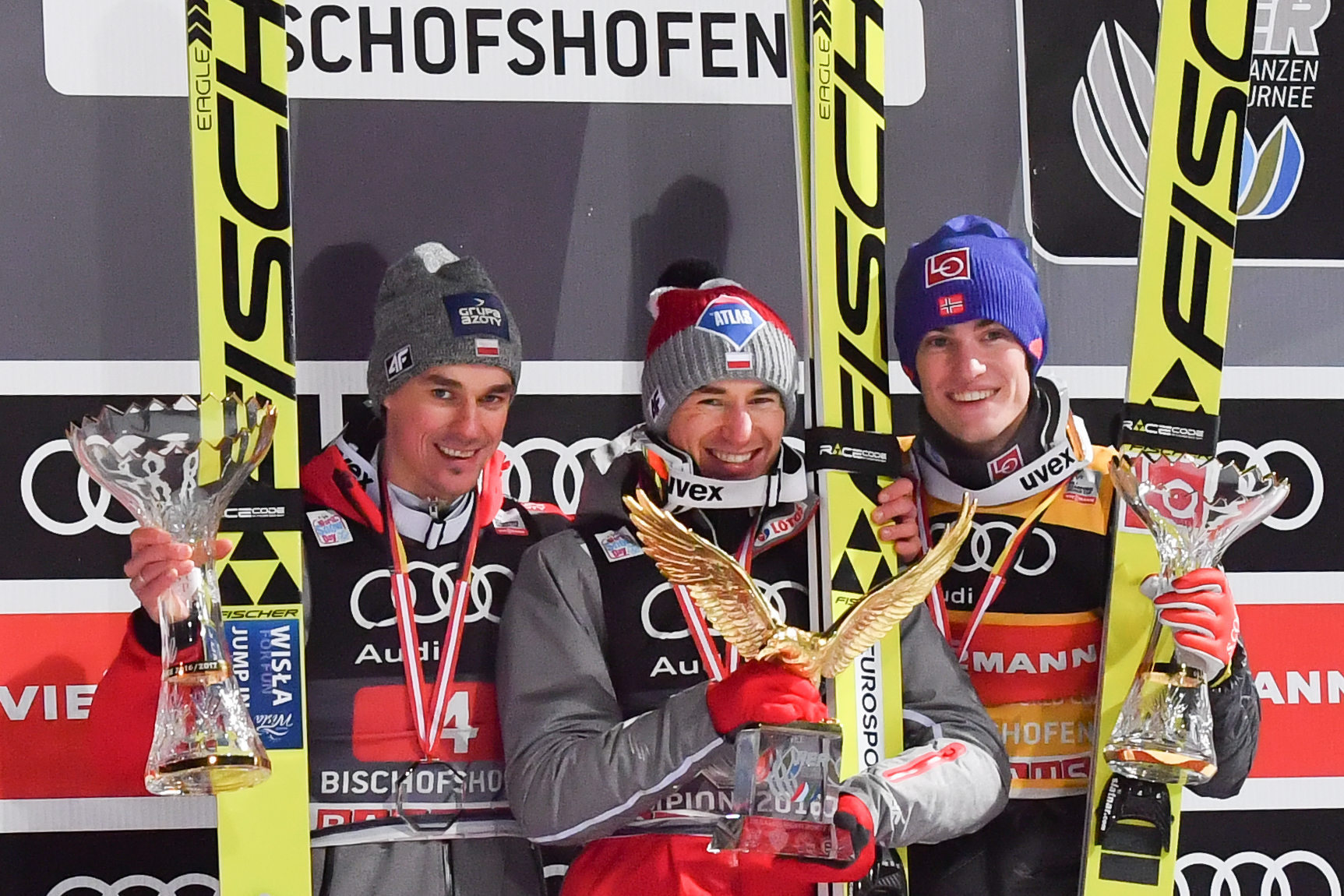
Stoch on podium with trophy of 2016–17 Four Hills Tournament.

Competing in Klingenthal on 3 December 2016, the Polish national team, again composed of Żyła, Stoch, Kubacki and Kot, won their country's first-ever World Cup team event. On 11 December 2016, he achieved his 16th victory in World Cup competition ahead of the second-placed Maciej Kot with predominantly 0.6 a point.

During the 2016–17 Four Hills Tournament, he achieved second place twice, in Oberstdorf and Garmisch-Partenkirchen. In the trial before the competition in Innsbruck, Stoch fell while landing after a long-jump. He had a very painful shoulder injury and hematoma. Despite the injury, he continued to participate in the tournament. In the windy competition in Innsbruck, he took fourth place, and the overall was second with a loss to leader Daniel-Andre Tande 1.7 points. On 6 January 2017, he won the last competition in Bischofshofen and won overall (997.8 points) with a predominance over the second overall Piotr Żyła 35.3 points. Since Bischofschofen, Stoch won two individual competitions in Wisła and one in Zakopane. He has not lost since in individual competitions. In Zakopane, the Polish team, including Stoch and his teammates – Kubacki, Kot, and Żyła, achieved second place in the team competition. On 28 January 2017, Poland won their second team competition in history in Willingen.

On 4 March 2017, the Polish national team, again consisting of Żyła, Kubacki, Kot and Stoch, achieved their first title in the team event at the 2017 World Championships. They beat Norway and Austria at Salpausselkä K116 in Lahti, Finland.

=== 2017/2018 ===
In the 2017-18 Four Hills Tournament, Stoch became the second jumper in history – after Sven Hannawald – to win all four competitions in the Tournament, taking his second victory in a row with a total score of 1108.8 points and 69.6 points of advantage over the second-placed Andreas Wellinger.

On 20 January 2018, he achieved the silver medal of the 2018 Ski Jumping World Championships. In the three-part competition, he became the ski flying World Championships runner-up behind Daniel Andre Tande from Norway and ahead of Richard Freitag from Germany. It was the second medal in history for Poland in the Ski Flying World Championships after the bronze of Piotr Fijas in 1979. The next day, Stoch and his teammates Hula, Kubacki, and Żyła, won the first ever medal, a bronze, for Poland in ski flying in team competition.

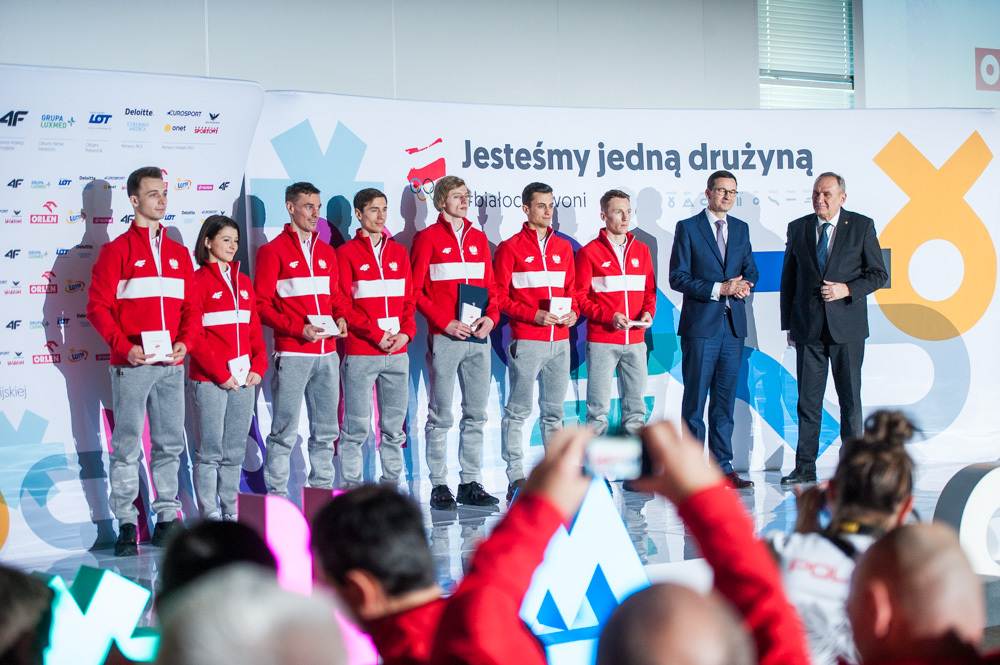
The oath of the Olympic team of ski jumpers and figure skaters before the 2018 Olympics.

On 4 February 2018, Stoch won overall classification in the newest tournament Willingen Five 2018. He won qualifications and took 4th and 2nd place in the following competitions.

Stoch was in good shape at the beginning of the 2018 Winter Olympic Games and had good jumps at training sessions and qualifications. At the normal hill event, he placed 4th. On 17 February 2018, he won a gold medal ahead of Andreas Wellinger and Robert Johansson at the large hill event. This was his third title of Olympic Champion. On 19 February 2018, Stoch and his teammates Maciej Kot, Stefan Hula and Dawid Kubacki achieved Poland's first medal in the team event at the Olympics. They claimed a bronze behind Norway and Germany.

== Olympic Games ==
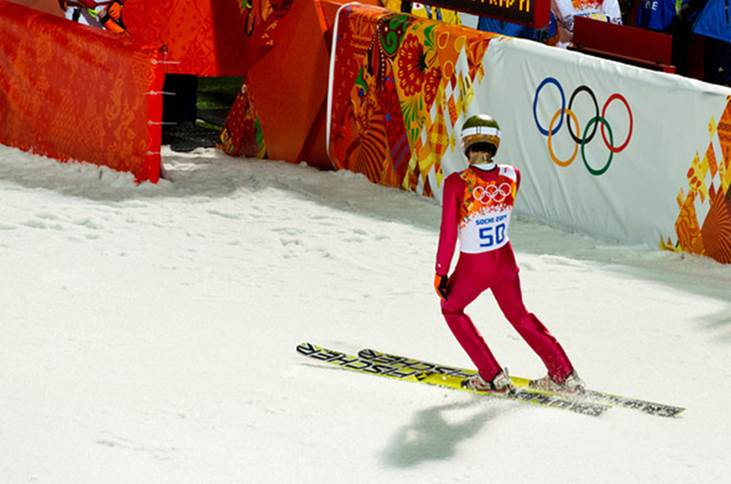
After his jump on normal hill – Sochi 2014.

Stoch competed at the Olympic Games six times – in Turin 2006, Vancouver 2010, Sochi 2014, PyeongChang 2018, Beijing 2022 and Milano Cortina 2026. In his first one in Turin, he was 16th on normal hill K95 and 26th place on large hill K125. In the team competition, he was with the Polish team in 5th place. In Vancouver, he was 27th on normal hill (weaker than in Turin) and 14th on large hill. In the team competition, in which he also jumped, Poland was ranked 6th.

In Sochi, Russia, in the individual competition on the normal hill, he won the title of Olympic Champion. At the same Olympics, Kamil Stoch also won the Olympic title in the individual competition on the large hill K125. He is the third man in history to win both hills individual events in single Olympics after Matti Nykänen in Calgary 1988 and Simon Ammann in Salt Lake City 2002, Vancouver 2010.

On 21 January 2018, coach Stefan Horngacher officially appointed Kamil Stoch to the 2018 Winter Olympics. Stoch took 4th place at normal hill event and 1st (earning him a gold medal) at the large hill event. It was his third title of Olympic Champion. Two days later, he added the fourth Olympic medal to his collection, a bronze with the Polish team (Poland's first-ever Olympic medal team).

Place	Day	Year	Locality	Hill	Point K	HS	Competition	Jump 1	Jump 2	Note (points)	Loss (points)	Winner
16.	12 February	2006	Pragelato	Trampolino a Monte	K-95	HS-106	individual	100.0 m	98.5 m	247.0	19.5	Lars Bystøl
26.	18 February	2006	Pragelato	Trampolino a Monte	K-125	HS-140	individual	116.5 m	121.0 m	200.0	76.9	Thomas Morgenstern
5.	20 February	2006	Pragelato	Trampolino a Monte	K-125	HS-140	team	122.0 m	124.5 m	894.4 (220.7)	89.6	Austria
27.	13 February	2010	Whistler	Whistler Olympic Park	K-95	HS-106	individual	98.5 m	95.5 m	232.0	44.5	Simon Ammann
14.	20 February	2010	Whistler	Whistler Olympic Park	K-125	HS-140	individual	126.0 m	123.5 m	224.1	59.5	Simon Ammann
6.	22 February	2010	Whistler	Whistler Olympic Park	K-125	HS-140	team	126.5 m	134.5 m	996.7 (248.8)	111.2	Austria
1.	9 February	2014	Krasnaya Polyana	RusSki Gorki	K-95	HS-106	individual	105.5 m	103.5 m	278.0	—	
1.	15 February	2014	Krasnaya Polyana	RusSki Gorki	K-125	HS-140	individual	139.0 m	132.5 m	278.7	—	
4.	17 February	2014	Krasnaya Polyana	RusSki Gorki	K-125	HS-140	team	130.5 m	135.0 m	1011.8 (269.0)	29.3	Germany
4.	10 February	2018	Pyeongchang	Alpensia	K-98	HS-109	individual	106.5 m	105.5 m	249.3	10.0	Andreas Wellinger
1.	17 February	2018	Pyeongchang	Alpensia	K-125	HS-142	individual	135.0 m	136.5 m	285.7	—	
3.	19 February	2018	Pyeongchang	Alpensia	K-125	HS-142	team	139.0 m	134.5 m	1072.4 (277.5)	26.1	Norway
6.	6 February	2022	Zhangjiakou	Snow Ruyi	K-95	HS-106	individual	101.5 m	97.5 m	260.9	14.1	Ryōyū Kobayashi
6.	7 February	2022	Zhangjiakou	Snow Ruyi	K-95	HS-106	mixed team	99.5 m	102.5 m	763.2 (256.1)	238.3	Slovenia
4.	12 February	2022	Zhangjiakou	Snow Ruyi	K-125	HS-140	individual	137.5 m	133.5 m	277.2	18.9	Marius Lindvik
6.	14 February	2022	Zhangjiakou	Snow Ruyi	K-125	HS-140	team	137.0 m	127.5 m	880.1 (247.9)	62.6	Austria

== World Championships ==
Kamil Stoch took part in FIS Nordic World Ski Championships eight times. He debuted in Oberstdorf, where he finished in 37th place on the large hill. Later he appeared in Sapporo, Liberec and Oslo. In 2013 he became a World Champion in Val di Fiemme. On 24 February 2017, he established a new hill record (103.5 m) at Salpausselkä HS97 in qualifications before the first competition of 2017 World Championships.

Place	Day	Year	Locality	Hill	Point K	HS	Competition	Jump 1	Jump 2	Note (points)	Loss (points)	Winner
—	18 February	2005	Oberstdorf	Schattenbergschanze	K-90	HS-100	individual	Did not qualify				Rok Benkovič
6.	20 February	2005	Oberstdorf	Schattenbergschanze	K-90	HS-100	team	86.5 m	82.0 m	859.0 (202.0)	111.5	Austria
37.	25 February	2005	Oberstdorf	Schattenbergschanze	K-120	HS-137	individual	117.5 m	—	108.5	204.7	Janne Ahonen
9.	26 February	2005	Oberstdorf	Schattenbergschanze	K-120	HS-137	team	117.0 m	—	449.7 (108.1)	687.6	Austria
13.	24 February	2007	Sapporo	Ōkurayama	K-120	HS-134	individual	117.5 m	121.0 m	221.3	44.8	Simon Ammann
5.	25 February	2007	Sapporo	Ōkurayama	K-120	HS-134	team	129.0 m	120.0 m	857.2 (241.7)	143.0	Austria
11.	3 March	2007	Sapporo	Miyanomori	K-90	HS-98	individual	92.5 m	93.0 m	238.5	38.5	Adam Małysz
4.	21 February	2009	Liberec	Ještěd	K-90	HS-100	individual	99.5 m	100.5 m	270.0	12.0	Wolfgang Loitzl
24.	27 February	2009	Liberec	Ještěd	K-120	HS-134	individual	119.5 m	—	113.6	27.7	Andreas Küttel
4.	28 February	2009	Liberec	Ještěd	K-120	HS-134	team	122.0 m	126.0 m	972.1 (246.2)	62.2	Austria
6.	26 February	2011	Oslo	Midtstubakken	K-95	HS-106	individual	94.0 m	101.0 m	240.5	28.7	Thomas Morgenstern
4.	27 February	2011	Oslo	Midtstubakken	K-95	HS-106	team	101.0 m	102.5 m	953.0 (247.3)	72.5	Austria
19.	3 March	2011	Oslo	Holmenkollbakken	K-120	HS-134	individual	131.0 m	124.5 m	235.7	41.8	Gregor Schlierenzauer
5.	5 March	2011	Oslo	Holmenkollbakken	K-120	HS-134	team	113.5 m	—	435.6 (100.6)	64.4	Austria
8.	23 February	2013	Predazzo	Trampolino Dal Ben	K-95	HS-106	individual	102.0 m	97.0 m	237.4	15.2	Anders Bardal
1.	28 February	2013	Predazzo	Trampolino Dal Ben	K-120	HS-134	individual	131.5 m	130.0 m	295.8	—	—
3.	2 March	2013	Predazzo	Trampolino Dal Ben	K-120	HS-134	team	134.0 m	130.0 m	1121.0 (301.9)	14.9	Austria
17.	21 February	2015	Falun	Lugnet	K-90	HS-100	individual	90.0 m	89.5 m	220.2	32.5	Rune Velta
12.	26 February	2015	Falun	Lugnet	K-120	HS-134	individual	125.0 m	124.5 m	225.0	43.7	Severin Freund
3.	28 February	2015	Falun	Lugnet	K-120	HS-134	team	129.5 m	126.0 m	848.1 (227.0)	44.5	Norway
4.	25 February	2017	Lahti	Salpausselkä	K-90	HS-97	individual	96.5 m	99.0 m	262.5	8.3	Stefan Kraft
7.	2 March	2017	Lahti	Salpausselkä	K-116	HS-130	individual	127.5 m	124.5 m	264.8	14.5	Stefan Kraft
1.	4 March	2017	Lahti	Salpausselkä	K-116	HS-130	team	130.5 m	124.5 m	1104.2 (288.6)	—	—
5.	23 February	2019	Innsbruck	Bergisel	K-120	HS-130	individual	128.5 m	129.5 m	259.4	20.0	Markus Eisenbichler
4.	24 February	2019	Innsbruck	Bergisel	K-120	HS-130	team	125.0 m	122.5 m	909.1 (246.3)	78.4	Germany
2.	1 March	2019	Seefeld	Toni-Seelos-Olympiaschanze	K-99	HS-109	individual	91.5 m	101.5 m	215.5	2.8	Dawid Kubacki
6.	2 March	2019	Seefeld	Toni-Seelos-Olympiaschanze	K-99	HS-109	mixed team	100.0 m	105.5 m	914.9 (253.2)	97.3	Germany
22.	27 February	2021	Oberstdorf	Schattenbergschanze	K-95	HS-106	individual	96.0 m	96.0 m	236.0	32.8	Piotr Żyła
19.	5 March	2021	Oberstdorf	Schattenbergschanze	K-120	HS-137	individual	120.0 m	129.5 m	230.0	46.5	Stefan Kraft
3.	6 March	2021	Oberstdorf	Schattenbergschanze	K-120	HS-137	team	133.0 m	132.5 m	1031.2 (255.8)	15.4	Germany
6.	25 February	2023	Planica	Srednja skakalnica	K-95	HS-102	individual	99.0 m	102.0 m	256.3	5.5	Piotr Żyła
8.	26 February	2023	Planica	Srednja skakalnica	K-95	HS-102	mixed team	97.5 m	92.0 m	846.0 (241.6)	171.2	Germany
4.	3 March	2023	Planica	Bloudkova velikanka	K-125	HS-138	individual	131.5 m	134.5 m	272.1	15.4	Timi Zajc
4.	4 March	2023	Planica	Bloudkova velikanka	K-125	HS-138	team	136.0 m	135.0 m	1129.1 (284.1)	49.8	Slovenia

== Ski Flying World Championships ==
Stoch became the runner-up of the 2018 Ski Flying World Championships in Oberstdorf. It was the second medal in ski flying for Poland after 39 years. Also, the next day he achieved, with the Polish team, a first medal in ski flying in team for Poland.

Place	Day	Year	Locality	Hill	Point K	HS	Competition	Jump 1	Jump 2	Jump 3	Jump 4	Note (points)	Loss (points)	Winner
35.	13–14 January	2006	Tauplitz	Kulm	K-185	HS-203	individual	152.0 m	—	—	—	129.9	658.1	Roar Ljøkelsøy
9.	15 January	2006	Tauplitz	Kulm	K-185	HS-203	team	137.5 m		—		463.7 (105.0)	1044.2	Norway
34.	22–23 February	2008	Oberstdorf	Heini-Klopfer-Skiflugschanze	K-185	HS-213	individual	174.0 m	—	—	—	158.3	695.1	G. Schlierenzauer
10.	24 February	2008	Oberstdorf	Heini-Klopfer-Skiflugschanze	K-185	HS-213	team	167.0 m		—		573.8 (148.9)	979.5	Austria
16.	19–20 March	2010	Planica	Letalnica bratov Gorišek	K-185	HS-215	individual	186.5 m	207.5 m	203.5 m	218.0 m	770.0	165.8	Simon Ammann
4.	21 March	2010	Planica	Letalnica bratov Gorišek	K-185	HS-215	team	197.5 m		222.5 m		1452.5 (402.8)	188.9	Austria
10.	24–25 February	2012	Vikersund	Vikersundbakken	K-195	HS-225	individual	191.0 m	211.5 m	—	—	353.9	54.8	Robert Kranjec
7.	26 February	2012	Vikersund	Vikersundbakken	K-195	HS-225	team	208.0 m		196.5 m		1444.5 (372.0)	203.9	Austria
5.	14–15 March	2014	Harrachov	Čerťák	K-185	HS-205	individual	186.0 m	190.0 m	—	—	363.8	27.2	Severin Freund
—	15–16 January	2016	Tauplitz	Kulm	K-200	HS-225	individual	134.5 m	—			90.3	Did not qualify.	
5.	17 January	2016	Tauplitz	Kulm	K-200	HS-225	team	207.0 m		202.5 m		1211.9 (345.5)	255.8	Norway
2.	19–20 January	2018	Oberstdorf	Heini-Klopfer-Skiflugschanze	K-200	HS-235	individual	230.0 m	219.0 m	211.5 m	—	638.6	13.3	Daniel A. Tande
3.	21 January	2018	Oberstdorf	Heini-Klopfer-Skiflugschanze	K-200	HS-235	team	209.5 m		204.0 m		1592.1 (416.7)	70.1	Norway
8	11–12 December	2020	Planica	Letalnica bratov Gorišek	K-200	HS-240	individual	213.0 m	229.0 m	223.0 m	222.5 m	808.5	68.7	Karl Geiger
3.	13 December	2020	Planica	Letalnica bratov Gorišek	K-200	HS-240	team	205.5 m		224.0 m		1665.5 (410.7)	62.2	Norway
22.	11–12 March	2022	Vikersund	Vikersundbakken	K-200	HS-240	individual	206.5 m	196.0 m	223.5 m	175.5 m	679.6	174.6	Marius Lindvik
5.	13 March	2022	Vikersund	Vikersundbakken	K-200	HS-240	team	194.0 m		221.5 m		1495.8 (341.5)	215.7	Slovenia
8.	28 January	2024	Tauplitz	Kulm	K-200	HS-235	team	211.0 m		210.0 m		1279.1 (389.3)	336.3	Slovenia

== World Cup ==
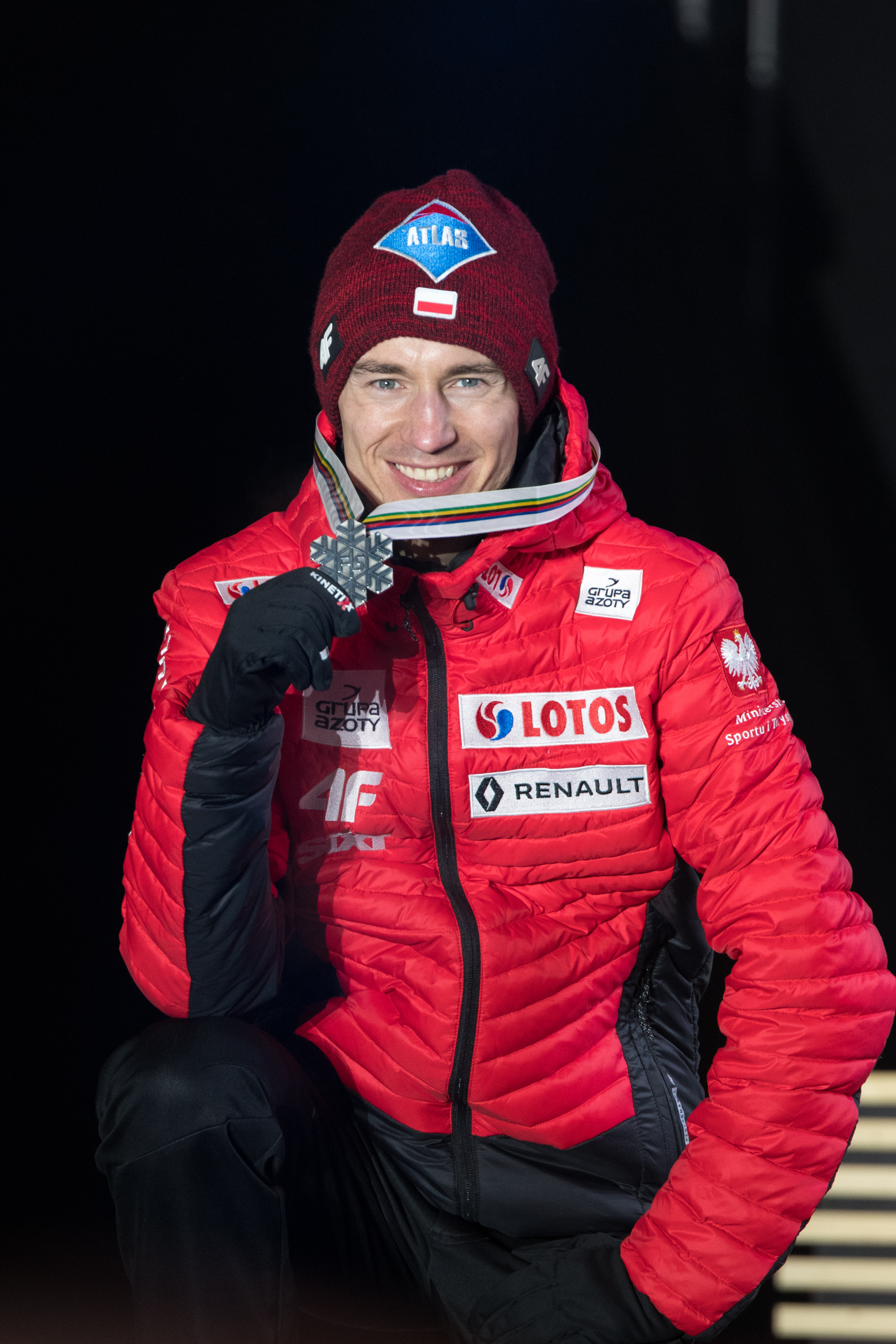
Stoch after medal ceremony of the FIS Nordic World Ski Championships 2019 in Seefeld

=== Season standings ===
Season	Overall	Ski-Flying	Four Hills Tournament	Raw Air	Willingen Five	Planica7	Titisee-Neustadt Five	Nordic Tournament
2004–05	53	—	—	—	—	—	—	54
2005–06	45	—	34	—	—	—	—	38
2006–07	30	22	15	—	—	—	—	21
2007–08	30	25	21	—	—	—	—	36
2008–09	30	22	36	—	—	—	—	55
2009–10	24	—	30	—	—	—	—	15
2010–11	10	9	15	—	—	—	—	—
2011–12	5	6	8	—	—	—	—	—
2012–13	3	9	4	—	—	—	—	—
2013–14	1	7	7	—	—	—	—	—
2014–15	9	16	10	—	—	—	—	—
2015–16	22	19	23	—	—	—	—	—
2016–17	2	3	1	2	—	—	—	—
2017–18	1	2	1	1	1	1	—	—
2018–19	3	7	6	9	4	11	—	—
2019–20	5	6	13	1	5	—	20	—
2020–21	3	31	1	—	9	25	—	—
2021–22	19	13	53	12	—	10	—	—
2022–23	14	13	5	8	—	11	—	—
2023–24	26	17	15	30	—	16	—	—
2024–25	31	21	—	16	?	13	?	?
2025–26	31	36	19	—	?	27	?	?

=== Individual starts ===
Season	1	2	3	4	5	6	7	8	9	10	11	12	13	14	15	16	17	18	19	20	21	22	23	24	25	26	27	28	29	30	31	32	Points
2003/04	Kuusamo K120	Kuusamo K120	Trondheim K120	Titisee-Neustadt K120	Engelberg K125	Oberstdorf K120	Garmisch-Partenkirchen K115	Innsbruck K120	Bischofshofen K125	Liberec K120	Liberec K120	Zakopane K120	Zakopane K120	Hakuba K120	Sapporo K120	Sapporo K120	Oberstdorf K185	Willingen K130	Park City K120	Lahti K116	Kuopio K120	Lillehammer K120	Oslo K115										0
2003/04	–	–	–	–	–	–	–	–	–	–	–	49	–	–	–	–	–	–	–	–	–	–	–										0
2004/05	Kuusamo HS142	Kuusamo HS142	Trondheim HS131	Trondheim HS131	Harrachov HS142	Harrachov HS142	Engelberg HS137	Engelberg HS137	Oberstdorf HS137	Garmisch-Partenkirchen HS125	Innsbruck HS130	Bischofshofen HS140	Willingen HS145	Tauplitz HS200	Tauplitz HS200	Titisee-Neustadt HS142	Titisee-Neustadt HS142	Zakopane HS134	Zakopane HS134	Sapporo HS134	Sapporo HS134	Pragelato HS140	Lahti HS130	Kuopio HS127	Lillehammer HS134	Oslo HS128	Planica HS215	Planica HS215					36
2004/05	–	–	–	–	–	–	–	–	–	–	–	–	–	–	–	–	–	44	q	–	–	7	q	q	40	34	–	–					36
2005/06	Kuusamo HS142	Kuusamo HS142	Lillehammer HS134	Lillehammer HS134	Harrachov HS142	Harrachov HS142	Engelberg HS137	Oberstdorf HS137	Garmisch-Partenkirchen HS125	Innsbruck HS130	Bischofshofen HS140	Sapporo HS134	Sapporo HS134	Zakopane HS134	Zakopane HS134	Willingen HS145	Lahti HS130	Kuopio HS127	Lillehammer HS134	Oslo HS128	Planica HS215	Planica HS215											41
2005/06	26	43	35	33	25	–	41	49	29	41	33	–	–	15	19	–	40	34	34	44	q	–											41
2006/07	Kuusamo HS142	Lillehammer HS138	Lillehammer HS138	Engelberg HS137	Engelberg HS137	Oberstdorf HS137	Garmisch-Partenkirchen HS125	Innsbruck HS130	Bischofshofen HS140	Vikersund HS207	Zakopane HS134	Oberstdorf HS137	Oberstdorf HS137	Titisee-Neustadt HS142	Titisee-Neustadt HS142	Klingenthal HS140	Willingen HS145	Lahti HS130	Kuopio HS127	Oslo HS128	Oslo HS128	Planica HS215	Planica HS215	Planica HS215									168
2006/07	46	40	26	q	q	29	21	15	9	25	36	50	41	17	34	24	–	12	17	45	19	24	36	11									168
2007/08	Kuusamo HS142	Trondheim HS131	Trondheim HS131	Villach HS98	Villach HS98	Engelberg HS137	Engelberg HS137	Oberstdorf HS137	Garmisch-Partenkirchen HS140	Bischofshofen HS140	Bischofshofen HS140	Predazzo HS134	Predazzo HS134	Harrachov HS205	Zakopane HS134	Zakopane HS134	Sapporo HS134	Sapporo HS134	Liberec HS134	Liberec HS134	Willingen HS145	Kuopio HS127	Kuopio HS127	Lillehammer HS138	Oslo HS128	Planica HS215	Planica HS215						157
2007/08	q	34	35	34	34	41	18	22	23	25	35	6	19	12	21	25	44	20	q	24	q	23	32	35	30	29	29						157
2008/09	Kuusamo HS142	Trondheim HS140	Trondheim HS140	Pragelato HS140	Pragelato HS140	Engelberg HS137	Engelberg HS137	Oberstdorf HS137	Garmisch-Partenkirchen HS140	Innsbruck HS130	Bischofshofen HS140	Tauplitz HS200	Tauplitz HS200	Zakopane HS134	Zakopane HS134	Whistler HS140	Whistler HS140	Sapporo HS134	Willingen HS145	Klingenthal HS140	Oberstdorf HS213	Lahti HS97	Kuopio HS127	Lillehammer HS138	Vikersund HS207	Planica HS215	Planica HS215						146
2008/09	48	46	47	–	–	q	q	–	47	27	28	–	–	11	14	19	24	13	35	41	–	q	45	42	q	10	8						146
2009/10	Kuusamo HS142	Lillehammer HS138	Lillehammer HS138	Engelberg HS137	Engelberg HS137	Engelberg HS137	Oberstdorf HS137	Garmisch-Partenkirchen HS140	Innsbruck HS130	Bischofshofen HS140	Bad Mitterndorf HS200	Bad Mitterndorf HS200	Sapporo HS134	Sapporo HS134	Zakopane HS134	Zakopane HS134	Oberstdorf HS213	Klingenthal HS140	Willingen HS145	Lahti HS130	Kuopio HS127	Lillehammer HS138	Oslo HS134										203
2009/10	24	20	7	10	17	11	q	23	19	44	q	q	–	–	27	28	–	–	–	18	21	10	22										203
2010/11	Kuusamo HS142	Kuopio HS127	Lillehammer HS138	Lillehammer HS138	Engelberg HS137	Engelberg HS137	Engelberg HS137	Oberstdorf HS137	Garmisch-Partenkirchen HS140	Innsbruck HS130	Bischofshofen HS140	Harrachov HS205	Harrachov HS205	Sapporo HS134	Sapporo HS134	Zakopane HS134	Zakopane HS134	Zakopane HS134	Willingen HS145	Klingenthal HS140	Oberstdorf HS213	Vikersund HS225	Vikersund HS225	Lahti HS130	Planica HS215	Planica HS215							739
2010/11	34	20	22	16	9	12	9	25	8	21	15	16	14	–	–	17	7	1	6	1	11	11	11	9	7	1							739
2011/12	Kuusamo HS142	Lillehammer HS100	Lillehammer HS138	Harrachov HS142	Harrachov HS142	Engelberg HS137	Engelberg HS137	Oberstdorf HS137	Garmisch-Partenkirchen HS140	Innsbruck HS130	Bischofshofen HS140	Bad Mitterndorf HS200	Bad Mitterndorf HS200	Zakopane HS134	Zakopane HS134	Sapporo HS134	Sapporo HS134	Predazzo HS134	Predazzo HS134	Willingen HS145	Oberstdorf HS213	Lahti HS97	Trondheim HS140	Oslo HS134	Planica HS215	Planica HS215							1078
2011/12	4	3	48	15	13	12	2	23	4	9	9	6	3	1	7	3	2	7	1	5	6	39	6	11	9	11							1078
2012/13	Lillehammer HS100	Lillehammer HS138	Kuusamo HS142	Krasnaja Polana HS106	Krasnaja Polana HS106	Engelberg HS137	Engelberg HS137	Oberstdorf HS137	Garmisch-Partenkirchen HS140	Innsbruck HS130	Bischofshofen HS140	Wisła HS134	Zakopane HS134	Sapporo HS134	Sapporo HS134	Vikersund HS225	Vikersund HS225	Harrachov HS205	Harrachov HS205	Klingenthal HS140	Oberstdorf HS213	Lahti HS130	Kuopio HS127	Trondheim HS140	Oslo HS134	Planica HS215	Planica HS215						953
2012/13	30	36	q	–	–	2	14	13	6	2	4	7	3	9	5	5	7	9	8	30	–	5	1	1	4	11	8						953
2013/14	Klingenthal HS140	Kuusamo HS142	Lillehammer HS100	Lillehammer HS138	Titisee-Neustadt HS142	Titisee-Neustadt HS142	Engelberg HS137	Engelberg HS137	Oberstdorf HS137	Garmisch-Partenkirchen HS140	Innsbruck HS130	Bischofshofen HS140	Tauplitz HS200	Tauplitz HS200	Wisła HS134	Zakopane HS134	Sapporo HS134	Sapporo HS134	Willingen HS145	Willingen HS145	Falun HS134	Lahti HS130	Lahti HS130	Kuopio HS127	Trondheim HS140	Oslo HS134	Planica HS139	Planica HS139					1420
2013/14	37	10	20	18	2	1	2	1	13	7	3	8	6	9	2	17	–	–	1	1	4	3	1	1	9	3	4	4					1420
2014/15	Klingenthal HS140	Kuusamo HS142	Kuusamo HS142	Lillehammer HS138	Lillehammer HS138	Nizhny Tagil HS134	Nizhny Tagil HS134	Engelberg HS137	Engelberg HS137	Oberstdorf HS137	Garmisch-Partenkirchen HS140	Innsbruck HS130	Bischofshofen HS140	Tauplitz HS225	Wisła HS134	Zakopane HS134	Sapporo HS134	Sapporo HS134	Willingen HS145	Willingen HS145	Titisee-Neustadt HS142	Titisee-Neustadt HS142	Vikersund HS225	Vikersund HS225	Lahti HS130	Kuopio HS100	Trondheim HS140	Oslo HS134	Oslo HS134	Planica HS225	Planica HS225		820
2014/15	–	–	–	–	–	–	–	–	–	4	15	7	15	–	15	1	7	2	1	7	4	2	–	–	45	–	12	5	3	8	5		820
2015/16	Klingenthal HS140	Lillehammer HS100	Lillehammer HS100	Nizhny Tagil HS134	Nizhny Tagil HS134	Engelberg HS137	Engelberg HS137	Oberstdorf HS137	Garmisch-Partenkirchen HS140	Innsbruck HS130	Bischofshofen HS140	Willingen HS145	Zakopane HS134	Sapporo HS134	Sapporo HS134	Trondheim HS140	Vikersund HS225	Vikersund HS225	Vikersund HS225	Lahti HS130	Lahti HS100	Kuopio HS127	Almaty HS140	Almaty HS140	Wisła HS134	Titisee-Neustadt HS142	Planica HS225	Planica HS225	Planica HS225				295
2015/16	13	15	47	q	6	20	26	23	19	16	33	–	8	18	41	28	14	q	23	23	q	27	–	–	10	13	15	21	21				295
2016/17	Kuusamo HS142	Kuusamo HS142	Klingenthal HS140	Lillehammer HS138	Lillehammer HS138	Engelberg HS140	Engelberg HS140	Oberstdorf HS137	Garmisch-Partenkirchen HS140	Innsbruck HS130	Bischofshofen HS140	Wisła HS134	Wisła HS134	Zakopane HS134	Willingen HS145	Oberstdorf HS225	Oberstdorf HS225	Sapporo HS137	Sapporo HS137	Pyeongchang HS140	Pyeongchang HS109	Oslo HS134	Trondheim HS140	Vikersund HS225	Planica HS225	Planica HS225							1584
2016/17	26	22	4	4	1	9	2	2	2	4	1	1	1	1	5	3	9	18	1	3	6	22	5	1	5	5							1584
2017/18	Wisła HS134	Kuusamo HS142	Nizhny Tagil HS134	Nizhny Tagil HS134	Titisee-Neustadt HS142	Engelberg HS140	Engelberg HS140	Oberstdorf HS137	Garmisch-Partenkirchen HS140	Innsbruck HS130	Bischofshofen HS140	Tauplitz HS235	Zakopane HS140	Willingen HS145	Willingen HS145	Lahti HS130	Oslo HS134	Lillehammer HS140	Trondheim HS140	Vikersund HS240	Planica HS240	Planica HS240											1443
2017/18	2	20	15	7	6	3	2	1	1	1	1	21	38	4	2	1	6	1	1	6	1	1											1443
2018/19	Wisła HS134	Kuusamo HS142	Kuusamo HS142	Nizhny Tagil HS134	Nizhny Tagil HS134	Engelberg HS140	Engelberg HS140	Oberstdorf HS137	Garmisch-Partenkirchen HS142	Innsbruck HS130	Bischofshofen HS142	Predazzo HS135	Predazzo HS135	Zakopane HS140	Sapporo HS137	Sapporo HS137	Oberstdorf HS235	Oberstdorf HS235	Oberstdorf HS235	Lahti HS130	Willingen HS145	Willingen HS145	Oslo HS134	Lillehammer HS140	Trondheim HS138	Vikersund HS240	Planica HS240	Planica HS240					1288
2018/19	4	2	3	7	4	9	3	8	6	5	12	3	3	36	2	6	5	6	1	1	2	7	13	4	17	12	18	11					1288
2019/20	Wisła HS134	Kuusamo HS142	Nizhny Tagil HS134	Nizhny Tagil HS134	Klingenthal HS140	Engelberg HS140	Engelberg HS140	Oberstdorf HS137	Garmisch-Partenkirchen HS142	Innsbruck HS130	Bischofshofen HS142	Predazzo HS104	Predazzo HS104	Titisee-Neustadt HS142	Titisee-Neustadt HS142	Zakopane HS140	Sapporo HS137	Sapporo HS137	Willingen HS145	Tauplitz HS235	Tauplitz HS235	Râșnov HS97	Râșnov HS97	Lahti HS130	Lahti HS130	Lillehammer HS140	Lillehammer HS140						1031
2019/20	3	16	9	15	10	1	9	19	19	15	13	4	4	8	24	1	21	9	3	7	4	6	9	5	12	7	1						1031
2020/21	Wisła HS134	Kuusamo HS142	Kuusamo HS142	Nizhny Tagil HS134	Nizhny Tagil HS134	Engelberg HS140	Engelberg HS140	Oberstdorf HS137	Garmisch-Partenkirchen HS142	Innsbruck HS130	Bischofshofen HS142	Titisee-Neustadt HS142	Titisee-Neustadt HS142	Zakopane HS140	Lahti HS130	Willingen HS147	Willingen HS147	Klingenthal HS140	Klingenthal HS140	Zakopane HS140	Zakopane HS140	Râșnov HS97	Planica HS240	Planica HS240	Planica HS240								955
2020/21	27	12	7	–	-	2	7	2	4	1	1	1	17	11	16	3	27	2	6	20	23	2	32	32	20								955
2021/22	Nizhny Tagil	Nizhny Tagil	Ruka	Ruka	Wisła	Klingenthal	Klingenthal	Engelberg	Engelberg	Oberstdorf	Garmisch-Partenkirchen	Innsbruck	Bischofshofen	Bischofshofen	Zakopane	Titisee-Neustadt	Titisee-Neustadt	Willingen	Willingen	Lahti	Lahti	Lillehammer	Oslo	Oslo	Oberstdorf	Oberstdorf	Planica	Planica					397
2021/22	5	33	8	41	11	3	–	6	16	41	47	-	-	-	-	-	-	21	34	24	11	10	11	15	12	21	11	14					397
2022/23	Wisła	Wisła	Ruka	Ruka	Titisee-Neustadt	Titisee-Neustadt	Engelberg	Engelberg	Oberstdorf	Garmisch-Partenkirchen	Innsbruck	Bischofshofen	Zakopane	Sapporo HS137	Sapporo HS137	Sapporo HS137	Bad Mitterndorf	Bad Mitterndorf	Willingen	Willingen	Lake Placid	Lake Placid	Râșnov HS97	Oslo	Oslo	Lillehammer	Lillehammer	Vikersund	Vikersund	Lahti	Planica	Planica	608
2022/23	10	q	17	14	40	8	8	39	9	9	5	6	7	4	8	23	17	19	25	q	-	-	-	13	19	15	7	17	8	18	10	15	608
2023–24	Ruka	Ruka	Lillehammer	Lillehammer	Klingenthal	Klingenthal	Engelberg	Engelberg	Oberstdorf	Garmisch-Partenkirchen	Innsbruck	Bischofshofen	Wisła	Zakopane	Willingen	Willingen	Lake Placid	Lake Placid	Sapporo	Sapporo	Oberstdorf	Oberstdorf	Lahti	Lahti	Oslo	Oslo	Trondheim	Trondheim	Vikersund	Vikersund	Planica	Planica	256
2023–24	43	q	28	37	-	-	21	23	17	25	11	21	32	17	43	27	41	24	12	18	12	11	36	37	16	36	33	19	23	30	11	16	256

=== Victories ===
	Day	Year	Location	Hill	Point K	HS	Jump 1	Jump 2	Note (points)
1.	23 January	2011	Zakopane	Wielka Krokiew	K-120	HS-134	123.0 m	128.0 m	254.0
2.	2 February	2011	Klingenthal	Vogtlandarena	K-125	HS-140	132.0 m	136.5 m	264.6
3.	20 March	2011	Planica	Letalnica	K-185	HS-215	215.5 m	-	217.3
4.	20 January	2012	Zakopane	Wielka Krokiew	K-120	HS-134	125.5 m	135.0 m	257.9
5.	5 February	2012	Predazzo	Trampolino Dal Ben	K-120	HS-134	125.5 m	131.5 m	258.5
6.	12 March	2013	Kuopio	Puijo	K-120	HS-127	135.0 m	129.0 m	268.1
7.	15 March	2013	Trondheim	Granåsen	K-124	HS-140	131.0 m	140.0 m	280.4
8.	15 December	2013	Titisee-Neustadt	Hochfirstschanze	K-125	HS-142	142.5 m	138.5 m	300.7
9.	22 December	2013	Engelberg	Gross-Titlis-Schanze	K-125	HS-137	132.0 m	130.0 m	274.7
10.	1 February	2014	Willingen	Mühlenkopfschanze	K-130	HS-145	139.5 m	145.5 m	263.2
11.	2 February	2014	Willingen	Mühlenkopfschanze	K-130	HS-145	147.0 m	145.0 m	271.4
12.	2 March	2014	Lahti	Salpausselkä	K-116	HS-130	131.0 m	134.5 m	281.0
13.	4 March	2014	Kuopio	Puijo	K-120	HS-127	126.5 m	126.5 m	262.7
14.	18 January	2015	Zakopane	Wielka Krokiew	K-120	HS-134	134.0 m	133.0 m	276.2
15.	30 January	2015	Willingen	Mühlenkopfschanze	K-130	HS-145	147.0 m	142.5 m	276.6
16.	11 December	2016	Lillehammer	Lysgårdsbakken	K-123	HS-138	134.0 m	130.5 m	289.9
17.	6 January	2017	Bischofshofen	Paul-Ausserleitner-Schanze	K-125	HS-140	143.5 m	138.5 m	289.2
18.	14 January	2017	Wisła	Malinka	K-120	HS-134	133.0 m	124.0 m	268.0
19.	15 January	2017	Wisła	Malinka	K-120	HS-134	135.5 m	128.0 m	271.7
20.	22 January	2017	Zakopane	Wielka Krokiew	K-120	HS-134	130.5 m	131.0 m	287.4
21.	12 February	2017	Sapporo	Ōkurayama	K-120	HS-134	137.5 m	140.0 m	262.7
22.	19 March	2017	Vikersund	Vikersundbakken	K-200	HS-225	238.5 m	237.0 m	466.6
23.	30 December	2017	Oberstdorf	Schattenbergschanze	K-120	HS-137	126.0 m	137.0 m	279.7
24.	1 January	2018	Garmisch-Partenkirchen	Große Olympiaschanze	K-125	HS-140	135.5 m	139.5 m	283.4
25.	4 January	2018	Innsbruck	Bergisel	K-120	HS-130	130.0 m	128.5 m	270.1
26.	6 January	2018	Bischofshofen	Paul-Ausserleitner-Schanze	K-125	HS-140	132.5 m	137.0 m	275.6
27.	4 March	2018	Lahti	Salpausselkä	K-116	HS-130	132.0 m	134.0 m	314.2
28.	13 March	2018	Lillehammer	Lysgårdsbakken	K-123	HS-140	140.5 m	141.0 m	306.4
29.	15 March	2018	Trondheim	Granåsen	K-124	HS-140	146.0 m	141.0 m	285.4
30.	23 March	2018	Planica	Letalnica	K-200	HS-240	245.0 m	234.0 m	455.9
31.	25 March	2018	Planica	Letalnica	K-200	HS-240	245.0 m	234.5 m	455.6
32.	3 February	2019	Oberstdorf	Heini-Klopfer-Skiflugschanze	K-200	HS-235	214.5 m	227.5 m	413.2
33.	10 February	2019	Lahti	Salpausselkä	K-116	HS-130	132.5 m	129.0 m	280.9
34.	21 December	2019	Engelberg	Gross-Titlis-Schanze	K-125	HS-140	138.0 m	136.0 m	288.7
35.	26 January	2020	Zakopane	Wielka Krokiew	K-125	HS-140	137.5 m	140.0 m	295.7
36.	10 March	2020	Lillehammer	Lysgårdsbakken	K-123	HS-140	131.5 m	139.5 m	264.3
37.	3 January	2021	Innsbruck	Bergiselschanze	K-120	HS-128	127.5 m	130.0 m	261.6
38.	6 January	2021	Bischofshofen	Paul-Ausserleitner-Schanze	K-125	HS-142	139.0 m	140.0 m	300.7
39.	9 January	2021	Titisee-Neustadt	Hochfirstschanze	K-125	HS-142	139.0 m	144.0 m	281.6

=== Podiums ===
	Day	Year	Location	Hill	Point K	HS	Jump 1	Jump 2	Note (points)	Place	Lost (points)	Winner
1.	23 January	2011	Zakopane	Wielka Krokiew	K-120	HS-134	123.0 m	128.0 m	254.0	1.	–	–
2.	2 February	2011	Klingenthal	Vogtlandarena	K-125	HS-140	132.0 m	136.5 m	264.6	1.	–	–
3.	20 March	2011	Planica	Letalnica	K-185	HS-215	215.5 m	–	217.3	1.	–	–
4.	3 December	2011	Lillehammer	Lysgårdsbakken	K-90	HS-100	90.0 m	96.0 m	249.6	3.	39.7	Andreas Kofler
5.	18 December	2011	Engelberg	Gross-Titlis-Schanze	K-125	HS-137	129.0 m	137.0 m	260.8	2.	3.9	Andreas Kofler
6.	15 January	2012	Tauplitz	Kulm	K-185	HS-200	191.5 m	181.5 m	358.2	3.	6.7	Anders Bardal
7.	20 January	2012	Zakopane	Wielka Krokiew	K-120	HS-134	125.5 m	135.0 m	257.9	1.	–	–
8.	28 January	2012	Sapporo	Ōkurayama	K-120	HS-134	130.0 m	127.0 m	247.2	3.	5.4	Daiki Ito
9.	29 January	2012	Sapporo	Ōkurayama	K-120	HS-134	131.5 m	131.5 m	241.6	2.	2.1	Daiki Ito
10.	5 February	2012	Predazzo	Trampolino Dal Ben	K-120	HS-134	125.5 m	131.5 m	258.5	1.	–	–
11.	15 December	2012	Engelberg	Gross-Titlis-Schanze	K-125	HS-137	132.5 m	134.0 m	272.5	2.	0.1	Andreas Kofler
12.	4 January	2013	Innsbruck	Bergisel	K-120	HS-130	124.5 m	123.0 m	240.9	2.	12.8	Gregor Schlierenzauer
13.	12 January	2013	Zakopane	Wielka Krokiew	K-120	HS-134	133.0 m	127.0 m	268.7	3.	4.6	Anders Jacobsen
14.	12 March	2013	Kuopio	Puijo	K-120	HS-127	135.0 m	129.0 m	268.1	1.	–	–
15.	15 March	2013	Trondheim	Granåsen	K-124	HS-140	131.0 m	140.0 m	280.4	1.	–	–
16.	14 December	2013	Titisee-Neustadt	Hochfirstschanze	K-125	HS-142	137.0 m	141.5 m	280.8	2.	3.3	Thomas Morgenstern
17.	15 December	2013	Titisee-Neustadt	Hochfirstschanze	K-125	HS-142	142.5 m	138.5 m	300.7	1.	–	–
18.	21 December	2013	Engelberg	Gross-Titlis-Schanze	K-125	HS-137	129.0 m	137.5 m	269.2	2.	6.2	Jan Ziobro
19.	22 December	2013	Engelberg	Gross-Titlis-Schanze	K-125	HS-137	132.0 m	130.0 m	274.7	1.	–	–
20.	4 January	2014	Innsbruck	Bergisel	K-120	HS-130	126.5 m	–	126.2	3.	1.3	Anssi Koivuranta
21.	16 January	2014	Wisła	Malinka	K-120	HS-134	134.5 m	132.0 m	261.9	2.	0.9	Andreas Wellinger
22.	1 February	2014	Willingen	Mühlenkopfschanze	K-130	HS-145	139.5 m	145.5 m	263.2	1.	–	–
23.	2 February	2014	Willingen	Mühlenkopfschanze	K-130	HS-145	147.0 m	145.0 m	271.4	1.	–	–
24.	28 February	2014	Lahti	Salpausselkä	K-116	HS-130	127.0 m	124.5 m	259.8	3.	16.8	Severin Freund
25.	2 March	2014	Lahti	Salpausselkä	K-116	HS-130	131.0 m	134.5 m	281.0	1.	–	–
26.	4 March	2014	Kuopio	Puijo	K-120	HS-127	126.5 m	126.5 m	262.7	1.	–	–
27.	9 March	2014	Oslo	Holmenkollbakken	K-120	HS-134	132.0 m	127.0 m	245.4	3.	20.0	Severin Freund
28.	18 January	2015	Zakopane	Wielka Krokiew	K-120	HS-134	134.0 m	133.0 m	276.2	1.	–	–
29.	25 January	2015	Sapporo	Ōkurayama	K-120	HS-134	140.0 m	125.5 m	278.0	2.	4.9	Roman Koudelka
30.	30 January	2015	Willingen	Mühlenkopfschanze	K-130	HS-145	147.0 m	142.5 m	276.6	1.	–	–
31.	8 February	2015	Titisee-Neustadt	Hochfirstschanze	K-125	HS-142	130.0 m	137.5 m	274.8	2.	10.4	Anders Fannemel
32.	15 March	2015	Oslo	Holmenkollbakken	K-120	HS-134	124.0 m	134.0 m	251.5	3.	7.4	Severin Freund
33.	11 December	2016	Lillehammer	Lysgårdsbakken	K-123	HS-138	134.0 m	130.5 m	289.9	1.	–	–
34.	18 December	2016	Engelberg	Gross-Titlis-Schanze	K-125	HS-137	143.5 m	141.5 m	293.8	2.	12.1	Domen Prevc
35.	30 December	2016	Oberstdorf	Schattenbergschanze	K-120	HS-137	137.0 m	135.0 m	305.2	2.	2.8	Stefan Kraft
36.	1 January	2017	Garmisch-Partenkirchen	Große Olympiaschanze	K-125	HS-140	135.5 m	143.0 m	286.0	2.	3.2	Daniel Andre Tande
37.	6 January	2017	Bischofshofen	Paul-Ausserleitner-Schanze	K-125	HS-140	143.5 m	138.5 m	289.2	1.	–	–
38.	14 January	2017	Wisła	Malinka	K-120	HS-134	133.0 m	124.0 m	268.0	1.	–	–
39.	15 January	2017	Wisła	Malinka	K-120	HS-134	135.5 m	128.0 m	271.7	1.	–	–
40.	22 January	2017	Zakopane	Wielka Krokiew	K-120	HS-134	130.5 m	131.0 m	287.4	1.	–	–
41.	4 February	2017	Oberstdorf	Heini-Klopfer-Skiflugschanze	K-200	HS-225	222.5 m	217.0 m	425.4	3.	14.5	Stefan Kraft
42.	12 February	2017	Sapporo	Ōkurayama	K-120	HS-134	137.5 m	140.0 m	262.7	1.	–	–
43.	15 February	2017	Pyeongchang	Alpensia	K-125	HS-140	126.5 m	134.0 m	425.4	3.	25.3	Stefan Kraft
44.	19 March	2017	Vikersund	Vikersundbakken	K-200	HS-225	238.5 m	237.0 m	466.6	1.	–	–
45.	19 November	2017	Wisła	Malinka	K-120	HS-134	121.0 m	129.5 m	258.2	2.	2.3	Junshiro Kobayashi
46.	16 December	2017	Engelberg	Gross-Titlis-Schanze	K-125	HS-137	125.5 m	129.0 m	250.8	3.	2.8	Anders Fannemel
47.	17 December	2017	Engelberg	Gross-Titlis-Schanze	K-125	HS-137	137.0 m	133.0 m	274.8	2.	11.6	Richard Freitag
48.	30 December	2017	Oberstdorf	Schattenbergschanze	K-120	HS-137	126.0 m	137.0 m	279.7	1.	–	–
49.	1 January	2018	Garmisch-Partenkirchen	Große Olympiaschanze	K-125	HS-140	135.5 m	139.5 m	283.4	1.	–	–
50.	4 January	2018	Innsbruck	Bergisel	K-120	HS-130	130.0 m	128.5 m	270.1	1.	–	–
51.	6 January	2018	Bischofshofen	Paul-Ausserleitner-Schanze	K-125	HS-140	132.5 m	137.0 m	275.6	1.	–	–
52.	4 February	2018	Willingen	Mühlenkopfschanze	K-130	HS-145	145.5 m	140.5 m	269.4	2.	2.0	Johann Andre Forfang
53.	4 March	2018	Lahti	Salpausselkä	K-116	HS-130	132.0 m	134.0 m	314.2	1.	–	–
54.	13 March	2018	Lillehammer	Lysgårdsbakken	K-123	HS-140	140.5 m	141.0 m	306.4	1.	–	–
55.	15 March	2018	Trondheim	Granåsen	K-124	HS-140	146.0 m	141.0 m	285.4	1.	–	–
56.	23 March	2018	Planica	Letalnica	K-200	HS-240	245.0 m	234.0 m	455.9	1.	–	–
57.	25 March	2018	Planica	Letalnica	K-200	HS-240	245.0 m	234.5 m	455.6	1.	–	–
58.	24 November	2018	Kuusamo	Rukatunturi	K-120	HS-142	140.5 m	–	139.9	2.	2.1	Ryōyū Kobayashi
59.	25 November	2018	Kuusamo	Rukatunturi	K-120	HS-142	136.5 m	144.0 m	285.4	3.	25.0	Ryōyū Kobayashi
60.	16 December	2018	Engelberg	Gross-Titlis-Schanze	K-125	HS-140	138.0 m	131.0 m	279.5	3.	14.9	Ryōyū Kobayashi
61.	12 January	2019	Predazzo	Trampolino Dal Ben	K-120	HS-135	121.5 m	133.5 m	282.9	3.	32.1	Ryōyū Kobayashi
62.	13 January	2019	Predazzo	Trampolino Dal Ben	K-120	HS-135	120.0 m	128.5 m	256.9	3.	14.2	Dawid Kubacki
63.	26 January	2019	Sapporo	Ōkurayama	K-123	HS-137	133.0 m	148.5 m	260.3	2.	9.8	Stefan Kraft
64.	3 February	2019	Oberstdorf	Heini-Klopfer-Skiflugschanze	K-200	HS-235	214.5 m	227.5 m	413.2	1.	–	–
65.	10 February	2019	Lahti	Salpausselkä	K-116	HS-130	132.5 m	129.0 m	280.9	1.	–	–
66.	16 February	2019	Willingen	Mühlenkopfschanze	K-130	HS-145	144.5 m	144.5 m	307.1	2.	4.0	Karl Geiger
67.	24 November	2019	Wisła	Malinka	K-120	HS-134	118.0 m	126.5 m	224.2	3.	17.2	Daniel-André Tande
68.	21 December	2019	Engelberg	Gross-Titlis-Schanze	K-125	HS-140	138.0 m	136.0 m	288.7	1.	–	–
69.	26 January	2020	Zakopane	Wielka Krokiew	K-125	HS-140	137.5 m	140.0 m	295.7	1.	–	–
70.	8 February	2020	Willingen	Mühlenkopfschanze	K-130	HS-145	139.5 m	137.5 m	254.6	3.	11.8	Stephan Leyhe
71.	10 March	2020	Lillehammer	Lysgårdsbakken	K-123	HS-140	131.5 m	139.5 m	264.3	1.	–	–
72.	19 December	2020	Engelberg	Gross-Titlis-Schanze	K-125	HS-140	134.0 m	134.0 m	309.2	2.	2.2	Halvor Egner Granerud
73.	29 December	2020	Oberstdorf	Schattenbergschanze	K-120	HS-137	125.0 m	132.5 m	288.3	2.	2.8	Karl Geiger
74.	3 January	2021	Innsbruck	Bergiselschanze	K-120	HS-128	127.5 m	130.0 m	261.6	1.	–	–
75.	6 January	2021	Bischofshofen	Paul-Ausserleitner-Schanze	K-125	HS-142	139.0 m	140.0 m	300.7	1.	–	–
76.	9 January	2021	Titisee-Neustadt	Hochfirstschanze	K-125	HS-142	139.0 m	144.0 m	281.6	1.	–	–
77.	30 January	2021	Willingen	Mühlenkopfschanze	K-130	HS-147	142.5 m	135.5 m	272.2	3.	13.3	Halvor Egner Granerud
78.	6 February	2021	Klingenthal	Vogtlandarena	K-125	HS-140	138.5 m	134.0 m	271.6	2.	12.6	Halvor Egner Granerud
79.	19 February	2021	Râșnov	Râșnov Ski Jump	K-90	HS-97	92.5 m	97.5 m	256.3	2.	1.6	Ryōyū Kobayashi
80.	11 December	2021	Klingenthal	Vogtlandarena	K-125	HS-140	132.0 m	133.0 m	261.9	3.	5.1	Stefan Kraft

=== Team victories ===
	Day	Year	Location	Hill	Point K	HS	Jump 1	Jump 2	Note (points)
1.	3 December	2016	Klingenthal	Vogtlandarena	K-125	HS-140	139.0 m	140.0 m	1128.7 (294.8)
2.	28 January	2017	Willingen	Mühlenkopfschanze	K-130	HS-145	134.0 m	126.5 m	931.5 (243.1)
3.	27 January	2018	Zakopane	Wielka Krokiew	K-125	HS-140	134.0 m	141.5 m	1092.0 (292.4)
4.	17 November	2018	Wisła	Malinka	K-120	HS-134	126.5 m	129.0 m	1026.6 (274.1)
5.	15 February	2019	Willingen	Mühlenkopfschanze	K-130	HS-145	132.0 m	133.0 m	979.4 (247.4)
6.	23 March	2019	Planica	Letalnica	K-200	HS-240	227.0 m	221.0 m	1627.9 (400.8)
7.	14 December	2019	Klingenthal	Vogtlandarena	K-125	HS-140	126.0 m	126.0 m	968.7 (223.2)

== State awards ==
- 2014 Knight's Cross of Polonia Restituta
- 2017 Honorary Badge of Lesser Poland Voivodeship – Cross of Małopolska

== Other awards ==
- 2014, 2017 Polish Sportspersonality of the Year
- 2015 Holmenkollen Medal

== See also ==
- Sport in Poland
- Poland at the Winter Olympics
- List of Poles
