= Piotr Żyła =

Polish ski jumper (born 1987)

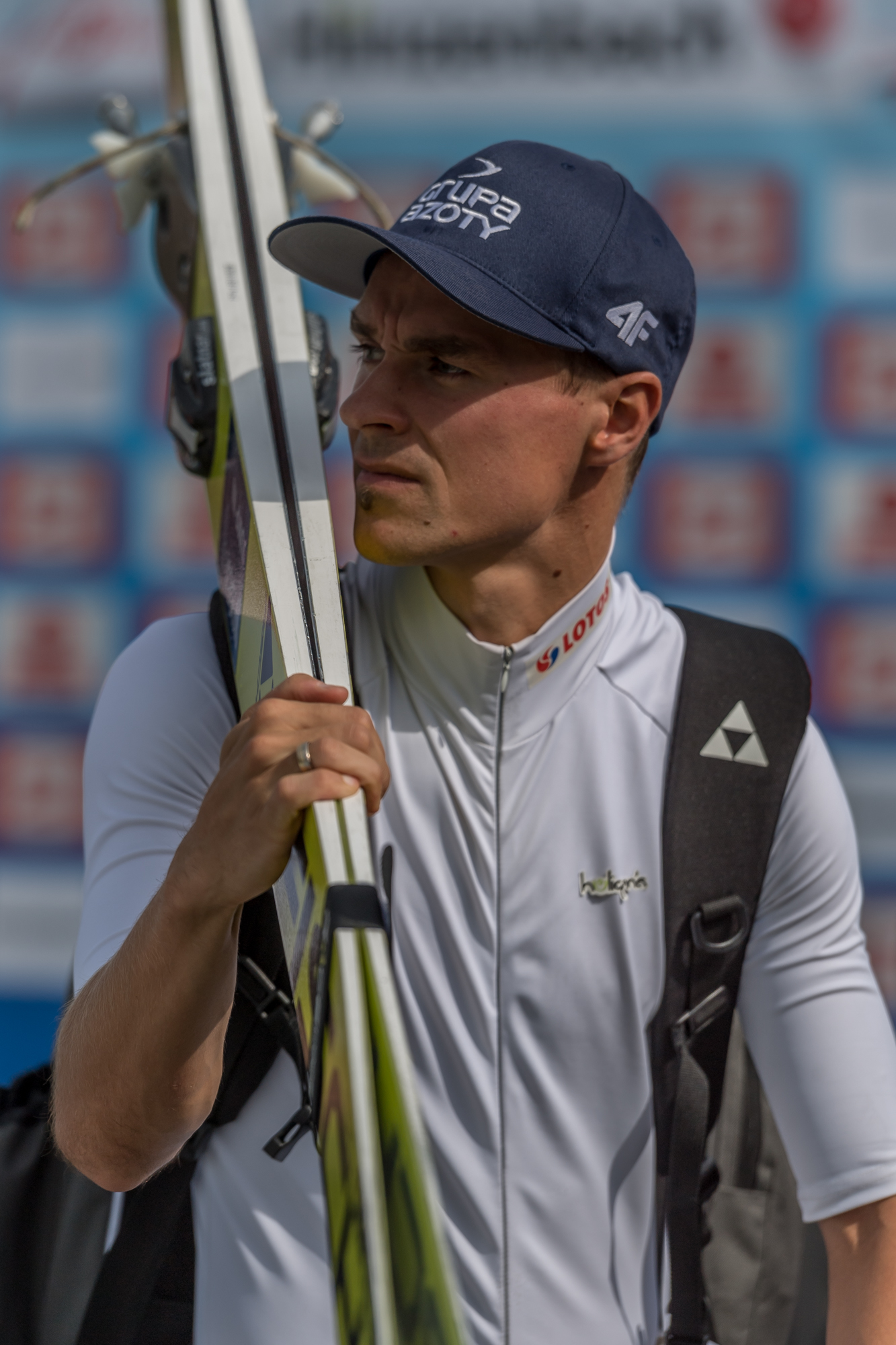
- Żyła at the FIS Summer Grand Prix in Hinzenbach, 2016

Personal information
- Nationality: Poland
- Born: 16 January 1987 (age 39) Cieszyn, Poland
- Height: 1.77 m (5 ft 10 in)

Sport
- Sport: Skiing
- Club: KS Wisła Ustronianka

World Cup career
- Seasons: 2004–
- Indiv. starts: 400
- Indiv. podiums: 23
- Indiv. wins: 2
- Team podiums: 25
- Team wins: 6

Achievements and titles
- Personal bests: 248 m (814 ft); Planica, 24 March 2019
Medal record
Representing Poland
Men's ski jumping
World Championships
Gold medal – first place	2017 Lahti	Team LH
Gold medal – first place	2021 Oberstdorf	Individual NH
Gold medal – first place	2023 Planica	Individual NH
Bronze medal – third place	2013 Val di Fiemme	Team LH
Bronze medal – third place	2015 Falun	Team LH
Bronze medal – third place	2017 Lahti	Individual LH
Bronze medal – third place	2021 Oberstdorf	Team LH
Men's ski flying
Ski Flying World Championships
Bronze medal – third place	2018 Oberstdorf	Team
Bronze medal – third place	2020 Planica	Team
- Updated on 01 February 2026

Piotr Paweł Żyła (Polish pronunciation: [ˈpjɔtr ˈʐɨwa]; born 16 January 1987) is a Polish ski jumper. He is a member of the national team and competed at the 2014 Winter Olympics in Sochi. He is the 2021 and 2023 World Champion on the normal hill, a bronze medalist of 2017 World Championships in individual large hill event, 2017 World Champion and a two-time World Championship bronze medalist (2013, 2015) and in the team large hill event, also the two time Ski Flying World Championships bronze medalist in team (2018, 2020).

Żyła held the Polish record (together with Kamil Stoch) for ski flight length (232.5 m) from 26 January 2013 to 21 March 2015, when Kamil Stoch attained 238 m at Letalnica bratov Gorišek. Żyła was the holder of the Polish national distance record with a jump of 245.5 m (805 ft) at the Vikersund ski flying hill from 18 March 2017 during team competition to 25 March 2017.

== Personal life ==
Piotr Żyła was born in Cieszyn, Poland. He graduated from the Sports Championships School in Zakopane, where he was classmates with Kamil Stoch. In 2006, he married Justyna Lazar, Adam Małysz's cousin. They have two children, a son and a daughter, respectively born in 2007 and 2012. They divorced in November 2018. Since 2020, he has been dating Marcelina Ziętek.

== Career ==
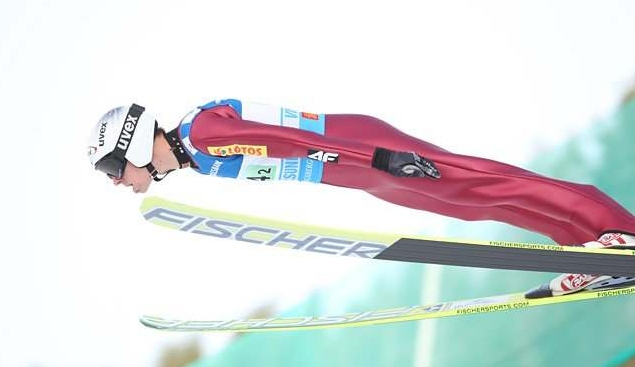
Piotr Żyła's longest jump in career (new record of Poland) in Vikersund.

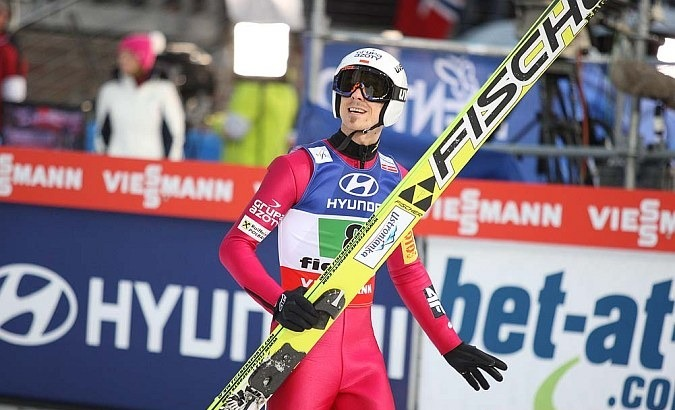
Team competition in Val di Fiemme 2013

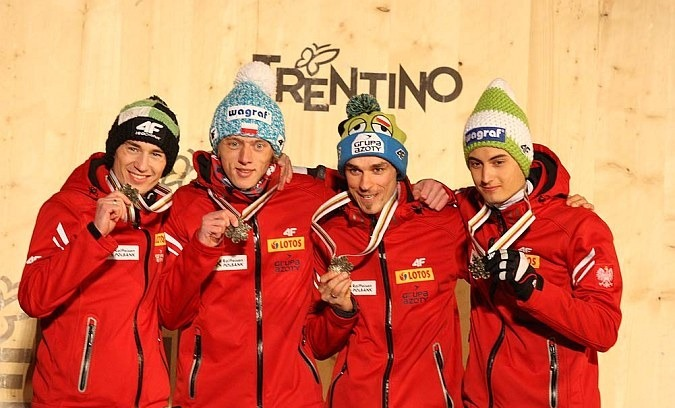
Medal ceremony after winning bronze medal in Val di Fiemme with Polish team: Maciej Kot, Kamil Stoch and Dawid Kubacki.

=== 2006/2007 ===
Żyła jumped on skis for the first time when he was eight years old. On 26 December 2004, he debuted in the Continental Cup at St. Moritz. The first points in this series were won on 14 January 2005 in Sapporo, when he was 19th. At the World Junior Championships, he was 14th, while the team won the silver medal. On 21 January in Sapporo, he got a chance to debut in the World Cup. In his first start, he scored points (19th place). A day later, again, the last time in the season, he was in the top 30. On 4 February, he won the Continental Cup in Villach. In the 2006/2007 season, he scored points in the World Cup four times. The highest place was the 19th in Titisee-Neustadt. He started well in the world championships. In the individual competition, he was 35th and 42nd. In the team competition, the Polish team was 5th.

=== 2007/2008 ===
In the season 2007/2008, he scored points just in Zakopane, Poland. He was 29th twice.

=== 2010/2011 ===
Training with coach Jan Szturc at the club meant he had better results in the Continental Cup. On 21 January in Zakopane was 21st, he repeated this result on 13 February at the ski flying hill in Vikersund. On 29 January 2011, he stood on the podium in the team competition in Willingen. He also starred in the World Championships. He finished 19th and 21st place individually and fourth and fifth in the team.

=== 2011/2012 ===
In the season 2011/2012, Żyła returned to team A. In the general classification beginning the summer season competitions, Lotus Poland Tour finished in last – 57th place. In the event of the Summer Grand Prix 2011 in Hakuba finished in second place twice. On 17 September, Wielka Krokiew won the bronze medal in Polish Championship after jumping a distance of 126.5 m and 118.5 m. After taking 4th place in the Summer Grand Prix in Klingenthal, he had the fifth position in the general classification of the Summer Grand Prix 2011.

=== 2012/2013 ===
On 4 December 2011, for the first time, he was ranked in the top 10. He was 7th in Lillehammer. He started in the World Cup Ski Flying in Vikersund. Individually he was 33rd, and the Polish team took 7th place. On 26 January 2013, he became the Polish record holder (with Kamil Stoch) in the length of the ski flight (232.5 m). In 2012/2013, he first scored the World Cup points at the seventh start, taking 30th place in Garmisch-Partenkirchen. On 9 January 2013, he took 6th place in Wisla. He repeated this result on 26 January in Vikersund and 13 February in Klingenthal. In the individual competitions at FIS Nordic World Ski Championships 2013, he took 23rd place on the normal hill and 19th on the large hill. On 2 March 2013 he won there a bronze medal in team competition with teammates: Kamil Stoch, Maciej Kot, Dawid Kubacki. The primary outcome of the competition was that his team took fourth place, but after recounting the scores because of Thomas Morgenstern, who noticed a mistake in points and at the request of the Germans, they finished in third place (Norway was in front of the Polish, but Bardal's jump was badly counted). On 17 March 2013 annually ex aequo with Gregor Schlierenzauer won the World Cup in Oslo. It was the first podium of his career. He was the fifth in the history of Polish ski jumpers after Stanisław Bobak, Piotr Fijas, Adam Małysz and Kamil Stoch, who won the World Cup competition. A week later, the penultimate competition of the season ranked third in the ski flying hill in Planica.

=== 2014/2015 ===
He took part in the World Championships 2015 in Falun, Sweden. He was 33rd on the normal hill (K-90) and 9th in the competition on the large hill Lugnet (K-120). On 28 February 2015 Polish team in squad: Żyła, Kamil Stoch, Klemens Murańka and Jan Ziobro achieved the bronze medal of World Championships 2015 in team. For Żyła, this was the second bronze of World Championships in team.

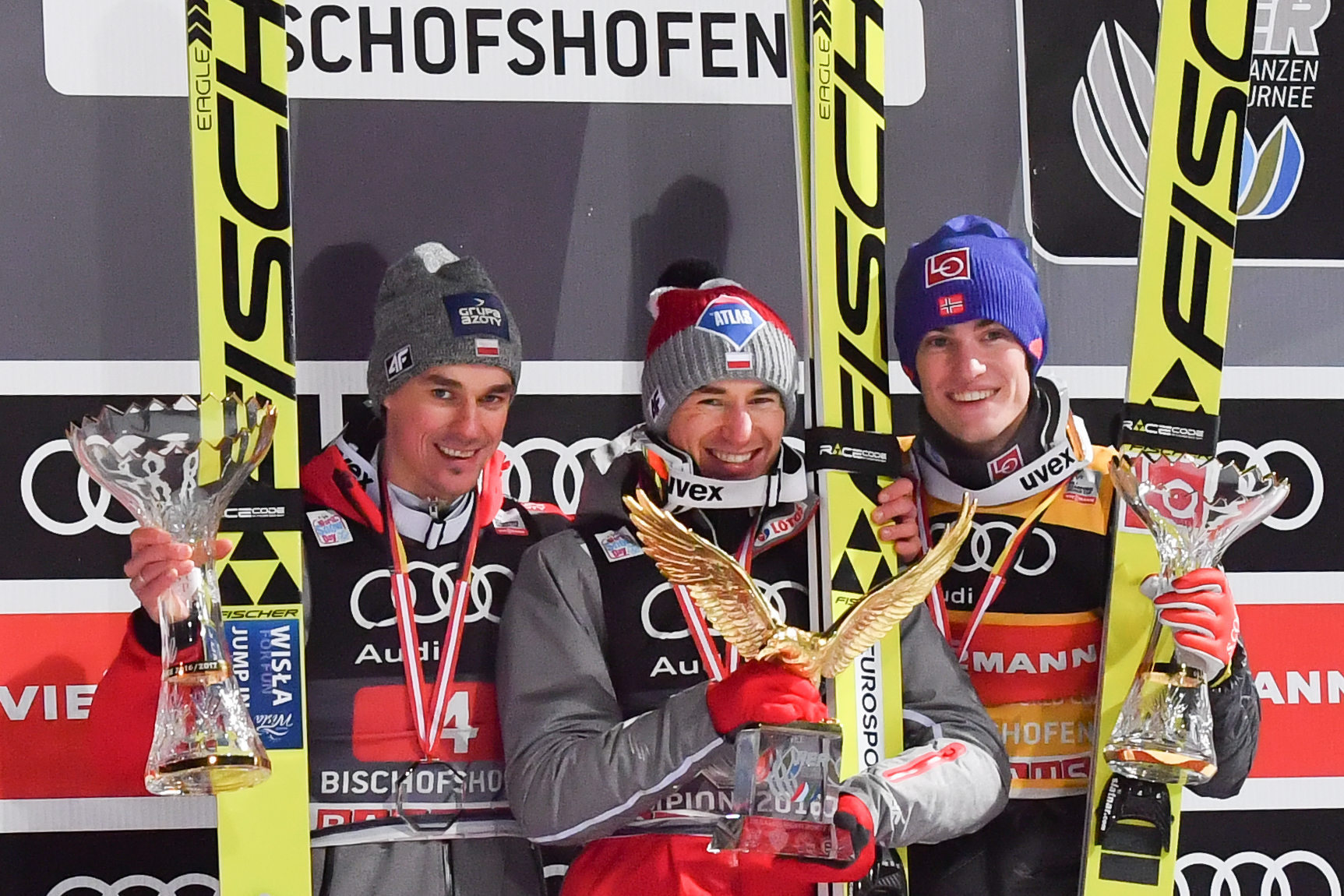
Żyła on the podium of the 2016–17 Four Hills Tournament.

=== 2016/2017 ===
On 3 December 2016 Polish national team including Żyła, Stoch, Kubacki and Kot won first competition in team for Poland in history. Żyła took part in 2016–17 Four Hills Tournament and finished 2nd in overall rankings, losing only to Stoch.

In Zakopane Polish team, including Stoch, Kubacki, Kot, Żyła achieved second place in team competition. On 28 January 2017 Poland won their second team competition in history in Willingen.

On 4 March 2017 Polish national team, including Żyła, Kubacki, Kot and Stoch, achieved first in history title of 2017 World Champions in the team event. They beat Norway and Austria at Salpausselkä K116 in Lahti, Finland.

=== 2017/2018 ===
On 21 January 2018 coach Horngacher officially appointed Żyła to 2018 Winter Olympics. In the last competition before the Olympic Games, Żyła took 3rd place behind Stoch and Forfang. It was his fourth individual podium in career.

Despite his presence at 2018 Winter Olympics in Pyeongchang, he had the weakest results from the Polish team in training before both competitions on normal and large hills. Therefore, he was neither in any competition nor in the team that won the bronze medal.

== Olympic Games ==
Place	Day	Year	Locality	Hill	Point K	HS	Competition	Jump 1	Jump 2	Note (points)	Lost (points)	Winner
34.	15 February	2014	Krasnaya Polyana	RusSki Gorki	K-125	HS-140	individual	118.0 m	-	108.7	170.0	Kamil Stoch
4.	17 February	2014	Krasnaya Polyana	RusSki Gorki	K-125	HS-140	team	121.0 m	132.0 m	1011.8 (233.5)	29.3	Germany
21.	6 February	2022	Zhangjiakou	Snow Ruyi	K-95	HS-106	individual	95.0 m	99.0 m	245.5	29.5	Ryōyū Kobayashi
18.	12 February	2022	Zhangjiakou	Snow Ruyi	K-125	HS-140	individual	133.0 m	132.5 m	255.5	40.6	Marius Lindvik
6.	14 February	2022	Zhangjiakou	Snow Ruyi	K-125	HS-140	team	118.0 m	125.5 m	880.1 (215.9)	62.6	Austria

== World Championships ==
Place	Day	Year	Locality	Hill	Point K	HS	Competition	Jump 1	Jump 2	Note (points)	Loss (points)	Winner
35.	24 February	2007	Sapporo	Ōkurayama	K-120	HS-134	individual	103 m	—	76.9	189.2	Simon Ammann
5.	25 February	2007	Sapporo	Ōkurayama	K-120	HS-134	team	115 m	111.5 m	857.2 (194.7)	143	Austria
42.	3 March	2007	Sapporo	Miyanomori	K-90	HS-98	individual	86.5 m	—	104	173	Adam Małysz
19.	26 February	2011	Oslo	Midtstubakken	K-95	HS-106	individual	93.5 m	96 m	224	45.2	Thomas Morgenstern
4.	27 February	2011	Oslo	Midtstubakken	K-95	HS-106	team	98 m	101 m	953 (235.6)	72.5	Austria
21.	3 March	2011	Oslo	Holmenkollbakken	K-120	HS-134	individual	121 m	124.5 m	232.9	43.6	Gregor Schlierenzauer
5.	5 March	2011	Oslo	Holmenkollbakken	K-120	HS-134	team	127 m	—	435.6 (118)	64.4	Austria
23.	23 February	2013	Predazzo	Trampolino Dal Ben	K-95	HS-106	individual	95.5 m	95 m	220.1	32.5	Anders Bardal
19.	28 February	2013	Predazzo	Trampolino Dal Ben	K-120	HS-134	individual	124.0 m	126.5 m	268.1	27.7	Kamil Stoch
3.	2 March	2013	Predazzo	Trampolino Dal Ben	K-120	HS-134	team	122.0 m	126.0 m	1121.0 (270.6)	14.9	Austria
33.	21 February	2015	Falun	Lugnet	K-90	HS-100	individual	89.5 m	—	101.1	151.6	Rune Velta
9.	26 February	2015	Falun	Lugnet	K-120	HS-134	individual	123.0 m	121.5 m	229.8	38.9	Severin Freund
3.	28 February	2015	Falun	Lugnet	K-120	HS-134	team	123.0	123.0	848.1 (216.2)	44.5	Norway
19.	25 February	2017	Lahti	Salpausselkä	K-90	HS-97	individual	91.5 m	94.0 m	240.2	30.6	Stefan Kraft
3.	2 March	2017	Lahti	Salpausselkä	K-116	HS-130	individual	127.5 m	131.0 m	276.7	2.6	Stefan Kraft
1.	4 March	2017	Lahti	Salpausselkä	K-116	HS-130	team	130,5 m	123,0 m	1104.2 (271.7)	—	—
19.	23 February	2019	Innsbruck	Bergisel	K-120	HS-130	individual	128.5 m	121.0 m	228.7	50.7	Markus Eisenbichler
4.	24 February	2019	Innsbruck	Bergisel	K-120	HS-130	team	121.5 m	119.5 m	909.1 (227.4)	78.4	Germany
33.	1 March	2019	Seefeld	Toni-Seelos-Olympiaschanze	K-99	HS-109	individual	90.5 m	—	82.1	136.2	Dawid Kubacki
1.	27 February	2021	Oberstdorf	Schattenbergschanze	K-95	HS-106	individual	105.0 m	102.5 m	268.8	—	—
6.	28 February	2021	Oberstdorf	Schattenbergschanze	K-95	HS-106	mixed team	100.0 m	93.0 m	837.6 (236.8)	163.2	Germany
4.	5 March	2021	Oberstdorf	Schattenbergschanze	K-120	HS-137	individual	130.5 m	137.0 m	264.4	12.1	Stefan Kraft
3.	6 March	2021	Oberstdorf	Schattenbergschanze	K-120	HS-137	team	139.0 m	139.0 m	1031.2 (285.7)	15.4	Germany
1.	25 February	2023	Planica	Srednja skakalnica	K-95	HS-102	individual	97.5 m	105.0 m	261.8	—	—
8.	26 February	2023	Planica	Srednja skakalnica	K-95	HS-102	mixed team	101.0 m	99.5 m	846.0 (257.4)	171.2	Germany
9.	3 March	2023	Planica	Bloudkova velikanka	K-125	HS-138	individual	128.5 m	133.5 m	266.0	21.5	Timi Zajc
4.	4 March	2023	Planica	Bloudkova velikanka	K-125	HS-138	team	131.5 m	133.0 m	1129.1 (279.7)	49.8	Slovenia

== Ski Flying World Championships ==
Place	Day	Year	Locality	Hill	Point K	HS	Competition	Jump 1	Jump 2	Jump 3	Jump 4	Note (points)	Loss (points)	Winner
—	22–23 February	2008	Oberstdorf	Heini-Klopfer-Skiflugschanze	K-185	HS-213	individual	165.0 m	—	—	—	145.0	—	Gregor Schlierenzauer
10.	24 February	2008	Oberstdorf	Heini-Klopfer-Skiflugschanze	K-185	HS-213	team	168.0 m		—		573.8 (150.1)	979.5	Austria
33.	24–25 February	2012	Vikersund	Vikersundbakken	K-195	HS-225	individual	168.0 m	—	—	—	133.8	274.9	Robert Kranjec
7.	26 February	2012	Vikersund	Vikersundbakken	K-195	HS-225	team	223.5 m		232.5 m		1444.5 (424.7)	203.9	Austria
17.	19–20 January	2018	Oberstdorf	Heini-Klopfer-Skiflugschanze	K-200	HS-235	individual	190.0 m	183.5 m	198.5 m	—	525.8	126.1	Daniel Andre Tande
3.	21 January	2018	Oberstdorf	Heini-Klopfer-Skiflugschanze	K-200	HS-235	team	212.5 m		204.0 m		1592.1 (382.0)	70.1	Norway
7.	11–12 December	2020	Planica	Letalnica bratov Gorišek	K-200	HS-240	individual	221.5 m	224.5 m	227.0 m	224.5 m	828.6	48.6	Karl Geiger
3.	13 December	2020	Planica	Letalnica bratov Gorišek	K-200	HS-240	team	226.0 m		234.0 m		1665.5 (431.6)	62.2	Norway
15.	11–12 March	2022	Vikersund	Vikersundbakken	K-200	HS-240	individual	215.0 m	187.0 m	225.0 m	209.5 m	725.7	128.5	Marius Lindvik
5.	13 March	2022	Vikersund	Vikersundbakken	K-200	HS-240	team	210.5 m		201.5 m		1495.8 (374.6)	215.7	Slovenia
6.	26–27 January	2024	Tauplitz	Kulm	K-200	HS-235	individual	218.0 m	220.5 m	225.0 m	—	626.4	21.0	Stefan Kraft
8.	28 January	2024	Tauplitz	Kulm	K-200	HS-235	team	212.5 m		177.5 m		1279.1 (335.4)	336.3	Slovenia

== World Cup ==
=== Season standings ===
Season	Overall	Ski-Flying	Four Hills Tournament	Raw Air	Willingen Five	Planica7	Titisee-Neustadt Five
2005–06	51	N/A	—	N/A	N/A	N/A	N/A
2006–07	55	N/A	—	N/A	N/A	N/A	N/A
2007–08	—	N/A	—	N/A	N/A	N/A	N/A
2008–09	81	—	40	N/A	N/A	N/A	N/A
2009–10	—	—	—	N/A	N/A	N/A	N/A
2010–11	54	38	—	N/A	N/A	N/A	N/A
2011–12	19	23	39	N/A	N/A	N/A	N/A
2012–13	15	8	23	N/A	N/A	N/A	N/A
2013–14	20	19	34	N/A	N/A	N/A	N/A
2014–15	19	11	19	N/A	N/A	N/A	N/A
2015–16	35	23	64	N/A	N/A	N/A	N/A
2016–17	11	10	2	14	N/A	N/A	N/A
2017–18	16	22	15	18	9	26	N/A
2018–19	4	3	19	17	2	4	N/A
2019–20	11	3	14	17	32	—	8
2020–21	7	10	5	—	4	11	—
2021–22	14	6	15	16	—	14	—
2022–23	6	7	4	16	—	7	—
2023–24	25	20	17	26	—	8	—
2024–25	39	25	38	—	—	20	—
2025–26	33	28	60	—	—	29	—

=== Individual starts ===
Season	1	2	3	4	5	6	7	8	9	10	11	12	13	14	15	16	17	18	19	20	21	22	23	24	25	26	27	28	29	30	31	32	Points
2005/06	Kuusamo HS142	Kuusamo HS142	Lillehammer HS134	Lillehammer HS134	Harrachov HS142	Harrachov HS142	Engelberg HS137	Oberstdorf HS137	Garmisch-Partenkirchen HS125	Innsbruck HS130	Bischofshofen HS140	Sapporo HS134	Sapporo HS134	Zakopane HS134	Zakopane HS134	Willingen HS145	Lahti HS130	Kuopio HS127	Lillehammer HS134	Oslo HS128	Planica HS215	Planica HS215											23
2005/06	–	–	–	–	–	–	–	–	–	–	–	19	20	47	q	–	–	–	–	–	q	–											23
2006/07	Kuusamo HS142	Lillehammer HS138	Lillehammer HS138	Engelberg HS137	Engelberg HS137	Oberstdorf HS137	Garmisch-Partenkirchen HS125	Innsbruck HS130	Bischofshofen HS140	Vikersund HS207	Zakopane HS134	Oberstdorf HS137	Oberstdorf HS137	Titisee-Neustadt HS142	Titisee-Neustadt HS142	Klingenthal HS140	Willingen HS145	Lahti HS130	Kuopio HS127	Oslo HS128	Oslo HS128	Planica HS215	Planica HS215	Planica HS215									34
2006/07	32	–	q	–	–	–	–	–	–	–	q	–	–	42	19	20	–	27	q	24	33	q	q	–									34
2007/08	Kuusamo HS142	Trondheim HS131	Trondheim HS131	Villach HS98	Villach HS98	Engelberg HS137	Engelberg HS137	Oberstdorf HS137	Garmisch-Partenkirchen HS140	Bischofshofen HS140	Bischofshofen HS140	Predazzo HS134	Predazzo HS134	Harrachov HS205	Zakopane HS134	Zakopane HS134	Sapporo HS134	Sapporo HS134	Liberec HS134	Liberec HS134	Willingen HS145	Kuopio HS127	Kuopio HS127	Lillehammer HS138	Oslo HS128	Planica HS215	Planica HS215						0
2007/08	44	–	–	–	–	47	q	–	–	–	–	–	–	–	q	q	38	45	–	–	–	49	49	q	45	39	–						0
2008/09	Kuusamo HS142	Trondheim HS140	Trondheim HS140	Pragelato HS140	Pragelato HS140	Engelberg HS137	Engelberg HS137	Oberstdorf HS137	Garmisch-Partenkirchen HS140	Innsbruck HS130	Bischofshofen HS140	Tauplitz HS200	Tauplitz HS200	Zakopane HS134	Zakopane HS134	Whistler HS140	Whistler HS140	Sapporo HS134	Willingen HS145	Klingenthal HS140	Oberstdorf HS213	Lahti HS97	Kuopio HS127	Lillehammer HS138	Vikersund HS207	Planica HS215	Planica HS215						4
2008/09	–	–	–	–	–	44	q	34	41	46	36	–	–	29	29	q	–	38	–	–	–	–	–	–	–	–	–						4
2009/10	Kuusamo HS142	Lillehammer HS138	Lillehammer HS138	Engelberg HS137	Engelberg HS137	Engelberg HS137	Oberstdorf HS137	Garmisch-Partenkirchen HS140	Innsbruck HS130	Bischofshofen HS140	Bad Mitterndorf HS200	Bad Mitterndorf HS200	Sapporo HS134	Sapporo HS134	Zakopane HS134	Zakopane HS134	Oberstdorf HS213	Klingenthal HS140	Willingen HS145	Lahti HS130	Kuopio HS127	Lillehammer HS138	Oslo HS134										0
2009/10	q	q	42	–	–	–	–	–	–	–	–	–	–	–	–	–	–	–	–	–	–	–	–										0
2010/11	Kuusamo HS142	Kuopio HS127	Lillehammer HS138	Lillehammer HS138	Engelberg HS137	Engelberg HS137	Engelberg HS137	Oberstdorf HS137	Garmisch-Partenkirchen HS140	Innsbruck HS130	Bischofshofen HS140	Harrachov HS205	Harrachov HS205	Sapporo HS134	Sapporo HS134	Zakopane HS134	Zakopane HS134	Zakopane HS134	Willingen HS145	Klingenthal HS140	Oberstdorf HS213	Vikersund HS225	Vikersund HS225	Lahti HS130	Planica HS215	Planica HS215							37
2010/11	–	–	–	–	–	–	–	–	–	–	–	–	–	31	26	21	32	31	31	46	27	31	21	28	26	–							37
2011/12	Kuusamo HS142	Lillehammer HS100	Lillehammer HS138	Harrachov HS142	Harrachov HS142	Engelberg HS137	Engelberg HS137	Oberstdorf HS137	Garmisch-Partenkirchen HS140	Innsbruck HS130	Bischofshofen HS140	Bad Mitterndorf HS200	Bad Mitterndorf HS200	Zakopane HS134	Zakopane HS134	Sapporo HS134	Sapporo HS134	Predazzo HS134	Predazzo HS134	Willingen HS145	Oberstdorf HS213	Lahti HS97	Trondheim HS140	Oslo HS134	Planica HS215	Planica HS215							267
2011/12	19	11	7	19	25	16	42	36	28	q	43	17	22	16	18	13	30	44	42	26	28	10	44	7	24	21							267
2012/13	Lillehammer HS100	Lillehammer HS138	Kuusamo HS142	Krasnaja Polana HS106	Krasnaja Polana HS106	Engelberg HS137	Engelberg HS137	Oberstdorf HS137	Garmisch-Partenkirchen HS140	Innsbruck HS130	Bischofshofen HS140	Wisła HS134	Zakopane HS134	Sapporo HS134	Sapporo HS134	Vikersund HS225	Vikersund HS225	Harrachov HS205	Harrachov HS205	Klingenthal HS140	Oberstdorf HS213	Lahti HS130	Kuopio HS127	Trondheim HS140	Oslo HS134	Planica HS215	Planica HS215						485
2012/13	36	43	48	–	–	36	37	31	30	22	30	6	18	26	22	6	10	22	13	6	–	12	15	9	1	3	5						485
2013/14	Klingenthal HS140	Kuusamo HS142	Lillehammer HS100	Lillehammer HS138	Titisee-Neustadt HS142	Titisee-Neustadt HS142	Engelberg HS137	Engelberg HS137	Oberstdorf HS137	Garmisch-Partenkirchen HS140	Innsbruck HS130	Bischofshofen HS140	Tauplitz HS200	Tauplitz HS200	Wisła HS134	Zakopane HS134	Sapporo HS134	Sapporo HS134	Willingen HS145	Willingen HS145	Falun HS134	Lahti HS130	Lahti HS130	Kuopio HS127	Trondheim HS140	Oslo HS134	Planica HS139	Planica HS139					343
2013/14	5	23	26	6	12	15	6	11	24	q	–	21	15	24	12	19	–	–	22	32	37	q	q	24	12	32	20	13					343
2014/15	Klingenthal HS140	Kuusamo HS142	Kuusamo HS142	Lillehammer HS138	Lillehammer HS138	Nizhny Tagil HS134	Nizhny Tagil HS134	Engelberg HS137	Engelberg HS137	Oberstdorf HS137	Garmisch-Partenkirchen HS140	Innsbruck HS130	Bischofshofen HS140	Tauplitz HS225	Wisła HS134	Zakopane HS134	Sapporo HS134	Sapporo HS134	Willingen HS145	Willingen HS145	Titisee-Neustadt HS142	Titisee-Neustadt HS142	Vikersund HS225	Vikersund HS225	Lahti HS130	Kuopio HS100	Trondheim HS140	Oslo HS134	Oslo HS134	Planica HS225	Planica HS225		474
2014/15	14	17	24	33	15	10	46	24	15	26	17	13	33	8	29	27	16	11	23	14	9	18	12	15	18	10	20	6	8	41	10		474
2015/16	Klingenthal HS140	Lillehammer HS100	Lillehammer HS100	Nizhny Tagil HS134	Nizhny Tagil HS134	Engelberg HS137	Engelberg HS137	Oberstdorf HS137	Garmisch-Partenkirchen HS140	Innsbruck HS130	Bischofshofen HS140	Willingen HS145	Zakopane HS134	Sapporo HS134	Sapporo HS134	Trondheim HS140	Vikersund HS225	Vikersund HS225	Vikersund HS225	Lahti HS130	Lahti HS100	Kuopio HS127	Almaty HS140	Almaty HS140	Wisła HS134	Titisee-Neustadt HS142	Planica HS225	Planica HS225	Planica HS225				89
2015/16	39	33	40	19	17	45	42	48	–	–	–	–	40	–	–	–	18	34	12	35	46	16	48	39	18	40	42	q	–				89
2016/17	Kuusamo HS142	Kuusamo HS142	Klingenthal HS140	Lillehammer HS138	Lillehammer HS138	Engelberg HS140	Engelberg HS140	Oberstdorf HS137	Garmisch-Partenkirchen HS140	Innsbruck HS130	Bischofshofen HS140	Wisła HS134	Wisła HS134	Zakopane HS134	Willingen HS145	Oberstdorf HS225	Oberstdorf HS225	Sapporo HS137	Sapporo HS137	Pyeongchang HS140	Pyeongchang HS109	Oslo HS134	Trondheim HS140	Vikersund HS225	Planica HS225	Planica HS225							634
2016/17	17	11	20	16	30	20	9	7	6	7	3	7	11	6	10	9	8	10	12	27	18	9	23	23	7	11							634
2017/18	Wisła HS134	Kuusamo HS142	Nizhny Tagil HS134	Nizhny Tagil HS134	Titisee-Neustadt HS142	Engelberg HS140	Engelberg HS140	Oberstdorf HS137	Garmisch-Partenkirchen HS140	Innsbruck HS130	Bischofshofen HS140	Tauplitz HS235	Zakopane HS140	Willingen HS145	Willingen HS145	Lahti HS130	Oslo HS134	Lillehammer HS140	Trondheim HS140	Vikersund HS240	Planica HS240	Planica HS240											403
2017/18	7	11	10	16	19	10	7	25	25	14	23	17	28	13	3	16	19	14	12	12	q	27											403
2018/19	Wisła HS134	Kuusamo HS142	Kuusamo HS142	Nizhny Tagil HS134	Nizhny Tagil HS134	Engelberg HS140	Engelberg HS140	Oberstdorf HS137	Garmisch-Partenkirchen HS142	Innsbruck HS130	Bischofshofen HS142	Predazzo HS135	Predazzo HS135	Zakopane HS140	Sapporo HS137	Sapporo HS137	Oberstdorf HS235	Oberstdorf HS235	Oberstdorf HS235	Lahti HS130	Willingen HS145	Willingen HS145	Oslo HS134	Lillehammer HS140	Trondheim HS138	Vikersund HS240	Planica HS240	Planica HS240					1131
2018/19	6	3	5	2	3	2	2	6	11	42	13	7	10	19	11	4	4	4	4	10	4	3	26	33	11	9	3	4					1131
2019/20	Wisła HS134	Kuusamo HS142	Nizhny Tagil HS134	Nizhny Tagil HS134	Klingenthal HS140	Engelberg HS140	Engelberg HS140	Oberstdorf HS137	Garmisch-Partenkirchen HS142	Innsbruck HS130	Bischofshofen HS142	Predazzo HS104	Predazzo HS104	Titisee-Neustadt HS142	Titisee-Neustadt HS142	Zakopane HS140	Sapporo HS137	Sapporo HS137	Willingen HS145	Tauplitz HS235	Tauplitz HS235	Râșnov HS97	Râșnov HS97	Lahti HS130	Lahti HS130	Lillehammer HS140	Lillehammer HS140						617
2019/20	35	13	24	35	9	8	33	5	15	12	27	7	4	9	8	8	8	21	35	1	9	9	21	37	6	23	26						617
2020/21	Wisła HS134	Kuusamo HS142	Kuusamo HS142	Nizhny Tagil HS134	Nizhny Tagil HS134	Engelberg HS140	Engelberg HS140	Oberstdorf HS137	Garmisch-Partenkirchen HS142	Innsbruck HS130	Bischofshofen HS142	Titisee-Neustadt HS142	Titisee-Neustadt HS142	Zakopane HS140	Lahti HS130	Willingen HS147	Willingen HS147	Klingenthal HS140	Klingenthal HS140	Zakopane HS140	Zakopane HS140	Râșnov HS97	Planica HS240	Planica HS240	Planica HS240								825
2020/21	5	2	23	–	–	5	3	21	3	4	7	3	16	q	11	9	2	4	17	8	33	5	10	7	13								825
2021/22	Nizhny Tagil HS134	Nizhny Tagil HS134	Kuusamo HS142	Kuusamo HS142	Wisła HS134	Klingenthal HS140	Klingenthal HS140	Engelberg HS140	Engelberg HS140	Oberstdorf HS137	Garmisch-Partenkirchen HS142	Bischofshofen HS142	Bischofshofen HS142	Bischofshofen HS142	Zakopane HS140	Titisee-Neustadt HS142	Titisee-Neustadt HS142	Willingen HS147	Willingen HS147	Lahti HS130	Lahti HS130	Lillehammer HS140	Oslo HS134	Oslo HS134	Oberstdorf HS235	Oberstdorf HS235	Planica HS240	Planica HS240					480
2021/22	32	16	23	27	25	17	14	q	15	38	11	18	13	7	17	–	–	DQ	41	3	14	8	22	18	5	2	18	12					480
2022/23	Wisła HS134	Wisła HS134	Kuusamo HS142	Kuusamo HS142	Titisee-Neustadt HS142	Titisee-Neustadt HS142	Engelberg HS140	Engelberg HS140	Oberstdorf HS137	Garmisch-Partenkirchen HS142	Innsbruck HS130	Bischofshofen HS142	Zakopane HS140	Sapporo HS137	Sapporo HS137	Sapporo HS137	Tauplitz HS235	Tauplitz HS235	Willingen HS147	Willingen HS147	Lake Placid	Lake Placid	Râșnov	Oslo	Oslo	Lillehammer	Lillehammer	Vikersund	Vikersund	Lahti	Planica	Planica	822
2022/23	5	8	3	5	6	4	3	5	2	6	10	10	39	14	9	8	4	6	4	7	19	25	–	29	24	27	14	10	15	20	3	14	822
2023–24	Ruka	Ruka	Lillehammer	Lillehammer	Klingenthal	Klingenthal	Engelberg	Engelberg	Oberstdorf	Garmisch-Partenkirchen	Innsbruck	Bischofshofen	Wisła	Zakopane	Willingen	Willingen	Lake Placid	Lake Placid	Sapporo	Sapporo	Oberstdorf	Oberstdorf	Lahti	Lahti	Oslo	Oslo	Trondheim	Trondheim	Vikersund	Vikersund	Planica	Planica	256
2023–24	31	21	24	25	11	22	22	34	28	22	14	29	14	29	48	q	21	4	45	DQ	26	21	37	37	12	19	40	29	25	26	23	5	256

=== Victories ===
	Day	Year	Location	Hill	Point K	HS	Jump 1	Jump 2	Note (points)
1.	17 March	2013	Oslo	Holmenkollbakken	K-120	HS-134	135.5 m	133.5 m	270.1
2.	15 February	2020	Tauplitz	Kulm	K-200	HS-240	225,5 m	219,5 m	418.5

=== Podiums ===
	Day	Year	Location	Hill	Point K	HS	Jump 1	Jump 2	Note (points)	Place	Lost (points)	Winner
1.	17 March	2013	Oslo	Holmenkollbakken	K-120	HS-134	135.5 m	133.5 m	270.1	1.	–	
2.	22 March	2013	Planica	Letalnica	K-185	HS-215	212.5 m	216.5 m	402.5	2.	9.7	Gregor Schlierenzauer
3.	6 January	2017	Bischofshofen	Paul-Ausserleitner-Schanze	K-125	HS-140	131.0 m	137.0 m	275.8	3.	13.4	Kamil Stoch
4.	4 February	2018	Willingen	Mühlenkopfschanze	K-130	HS-145	142.0 m	138.5 m	245.1	3.	26.3	Johann Andre Forfang
5.	24 November	2018	Kuusamo	Rukatunturi	K-120	HS-142	136.0 m	–	135.0	3.	7.0	Ryōyū Kobayashi
6.	1 December	2018	Nizhny Tagil	Tramplin Stork	K-127	HS-134	133.0 m	131.0 m	264.2	2.	0.2	Johann Andre Forfang
7.	2 December	2018	Nizhny Tagil	Tramplin Stork	K-127	HS-134	126.0 m	133.0 m	258.9	3.	14.2	Ryōyū Kobayashi
8.	15 December	2018	Engelberg	Gross-Titlis-Schanze	K-125	HS-140	134.0 m	136.0 m	298.9	2.	9.3	Karl Geiger
9.	16 December	2018	Engelberg	Gross-Titlis-Schanze	K-125	HS-140	137.5 m	135.0 m	285.1	2.	9.3	Ryōyū Kobayashi
10.	17 February	2019	Willingen	Mühlenkopfschanze	K-130	HS-145	142.0 m	137.5 m	250.0	3.	24.4	Ryōyū Kobayashi
11.	22 March	2019	Planica	Letalnica	K-200	HS-240	242.0 m	234.0 m	437.3	3.	7.7	Markus Eisenbichler
12.	15 February	2020	Tauplitz	Kulm	K-200	HS-240	225.5 m	219.5 m	418.5	1.	–	
13.	28 November	2020	Kuusamo	Rukatunturi	K-120	HS-142	136.0 m	137.0 m	294.1	2.	19.3	Markus Eisenbichler
14.	20 December	2020	Engelberg	Gross-Titlis-Schanze	K-125	HS-140	132.5 m	127.5 m	296.2	3.	9.2	Halvor Egner Granerud
15.	1 January	2021	Garmisch-Partenkirchen	Große Olympiaschanze	K-125	HS-142	129.5 m	137.0 m	260.4	3.	21.7	Dawid Kubacki
16.	9 January	2021	Titisee-Neustadt	Hochfirstschanze	K-125	HS-142	143.0 m	139.5 m	270.8	3.	10.8	Kamil Stoch
17.	31 January	2021	Willingen	Mühlenkopfschanze	K-130	HS-147	137.0 m	–	135.0	2.	19.3	Halvor Egner Granerud
18.	25 February	2022	Lahti	Salpausselkä	K-116	HS-130	120.5 m	129.5 m	268.0	3.	15.1	Stefan Kraft
19.	20 March	2022	Oberstdorf	Heini-Klopfer-Skiflugschanze	K-200	HS-235	218.5 m	221.0 m	401.1	2.	6.8	Timi Zajc
20.	26 November	2022	Kuusamo	Rukatunturi	K-120	HS-142	143.0 m	142.0 m	300.7	3.	12.1	Anže Lanišek
21.	17 December	2022	Engelberg	Gross-Titlis-Schanze	K-125	HS-140	141.0 m	139.0 m	312.3	3.	8.0	Anže Lanišek
22.	29 December	2022	Oberstdorf	Schattenbergschanze	K-120	HS-137	132.5 m	137.0 m	299.0	2.	13.4	Halvor Egner Granerud
23.	1 April	2023	Planica	Letalnica	K-200	HS-240	234.0 m	–	233.3	3.	7.2	Stefan Kraft

=== Team victories ===
	Day	Year	Location	Hill	Point K	HS	Jump 1	Jump 2	Note (points)
1.	3 December	2016	Klingenthal	Vogtlandarena	K-125	HS-140	134.0 m	134.0 m	1128.7 (268.7 )
2.	28 January	2017	Willingen	Mühlenkopfschanze	K-130	HS-145	134.0 m	138.0 m	931.5 (238.4)
3.	17 November	2018	Wisła	Malinka	K-120	HS-134	126.0 m	130.5 m	1026.6 (263.5)
4.	15 February	2019	Willingen	Mühlenkopfschanze	K-130	HS-145	146.0 m	129.0 m	979.4 (247.7)
5.	23 March	2019	Planica	Letalnica	K-200	HS-240	226.5 m	242.5 m	1627.9 (416.3)
6.	14 December	2019	Klingenthal	Vogtlandarena	K-125	HS-140	145.0 m	127.5 m	968.7 (249.6)
