= 2016–17 Four Hills Tournament =

Ski jumping competition

Four Hills Tournament at the 2016–17 FIS Ski Jumping World Cup
- Venue: Schattenbergschanze, Große Olympiaschanze, Bergiselschanze, Paul-Ausserleitner-Schanze
- Location: Austria, Germany
- Dates: 30 December 2016 – 6 January 2017

Medalists
gold medal	(Poland) Kamil Stoch
silver medal	(Poland) Piotr Żyła
bronze medal	(Norway) Daniel-André Tande

The 2016–17 Four Hills Tournament took place at the four traditional venues of Oberstdorf, Garmisch-Partenkirchen, Innsbruck, and Bischofshofen, located in Germany and Austria, between 30 December 2016 and 6 January 2017.

== Results ==
=== Oberstdorf ===
HS 137 Schattenbergschanze, Germany
30 December 2016

Rank	Name	Nationality	Jump 1 (m)	Jump 2 (m)	Points
1	Stefan Kraft	Austria	139.0	134.5	308.0
2	Kamil Stoch	Poland	137.0	135.0	305.2
3	Michael Hayböck	Austria	135.0	133.0	296.2
4	Daniel-André Tande	Norway	130.5	138.5	295.4
5	Manuel Fettner	Austria	132.5	135.0	294.9
6	Markus Eisenbichler	Germany	135.0	133.5	293.1
7	Piotr Żyła	Poland	133.0	133.0	291.9
8	Cene Prevc	Slovenia	132.5	132.0	284.4
9	Jurij Tepeš	Slovenia	133.5	131.0	283.2
10	Peter Prevc	Slovenia	130.0	135.0	281.8

=== Garmisch-Partenkirchen ===
HS 140 Große Olympiaschanze, Germany
1 January 2017

Rank	Name	Nationality	Jump 1 (m)	Jump 2 (m)	Points
1	Daniel-André Tande	Norway	138.0	142.0	289.2
2	Kamil Stoch	Poland	135.5	143.0	286.0
3	Stefan Kraft	Austria	137.0	140.0	282.4
4	Markus Eisenbichler	Germany	136.5	139.5	278.9
5	Domen Prevc	Slovenia	136.0	139.0	278.5
6	Piotr Żyła	Poland	137.0	137.0	278.1
7	Maciej Kot	Poland	135.5	135.0	269.6
8	Stephan Leyhe	Germany	135.5	134.0	268.8
9	Vincent Descombes Sevoie	France	133.0	137.0	268.1
10	Michael Hayböck	Austria	133.0	135.5	265.3

=== Innsbruck ===
HS 130 Bergiselschanze, Austria
4 January 2017

Rank	Name	Nationality	Jump 1 (m)	Jump 2 (m)	Points
1	Daniel-André Tande	Norway	128.5	Cancelled (wind)	125.7
2	Robert Johansson	Norway	133.0	Cancelled (wind)	123.1
3	Evgeniy Klimov	Russia	127.0	Cancelled (wind)	119.1
4	Kamil Stoch	Poland	120.5	Cancelled (wind)	117.4
5	Andreas Stjernen	Norway	122.5	Cancelled (wind)	117.1
6	Maciej Kot	Poland	121.0	Cancelled (wind)	117.0
7	Manuel Fettner	Austria	120.0	Cancelled (wind)	116.7
7	Piotr Żyła	Poland	121.0	Cancelled (wind)	116.7
9	Sebastian Colloredo	Italy	122.5	Cancelled (wind)	114.4
10	Noriaki Kasai	Japan	125.5	Cancelled (wind)	114.3

=== Bischofshofen ===
HS 140 Paul-Ausserleitner-Schanze, Austria
6 January 2017

Rank	Name	Nationality	Jump 1 (m)	Jump 2 (m)	Points
1	Kamil Stoch	Poland	134.5	138.5	289.2
2	Michael Hayboeck	Austria	130.5	142.0	283.3
3	Piotr Żyła	Poland	131.0	137.0	275.8
4	Domen Prevc	Slovenia	130.5	139.5	275.2
5	Maciej Kot	Poland	130.5	135.0	268.8
6	Richard Freitag	Germany	130.5	134.0	267.4
7	Jurij Tepeš	Slovenia	141.0	124.5	261.6
8	Stephan Leyhe	Germany	126.5	132.0	259.9
9	Karl Geiger	Germany	127.0	132.0	259.0
10	Andreas Stjernen	Norway	130.5	129.0	258.7

== Overall standings ==
The final standings after all four events:

Rank	Name	Nationality	Oberstdorf	Garmisch- Partenkirchen	Innsbruck	Bischofshofen	Total Points
1st place, gold medalist(s)	Kamil Stoch	Poland	305.2 (2)	286.0 (2)	117.4 (4)	289.2 (1)	997.8
2nd place, silver medalist(s)	Piotr Żyła	Poland	291.9 (7)	278.1 (6)	116.7 (7)	275.8 (3)	962.5
3rd place, bronze medalist(s)	Daniel-André Tande	Norway	295.4 (4)	289.2 (1)	125.7 (1)	231.5 (26)	941.8
4	Maciej Kot	Poland	278.9 (12)	269.6 (7)	117.0 (6)	268.8 (5)	934.3
5	Manuel Fettner	Austria	294.9 (5)	259.5 (12)	116.7 (7)	255.7 (12)	926.8
6	Stefan Kraft	Austria	308.0 (1)	282.4 (3)	103.3 (18)	232.8 (25)	926.5
7	Markus Eisenbichler	Germany	293.1 (6)	278.9 (4)	97.0 (29)	255.4 (13)	924.4
8	Stephan Leyhe	Germany	269.4 (17)	268.8 (8)	113.0 (11)	259.9 (8)	911.1
9	Domen Prevc	Slovenia	254.7 (26)	278.5 (5)	100.4 (25)	275.2 (4)	908.8
10	Andreas Stjernen	Norway	266.0 (19)	258.5 (14)	117.1 (5)	258.7 (10)	900.3
