= Bergisel =

Hill in Austria

Coordinates: 47°14′48″N 11°23′59″E

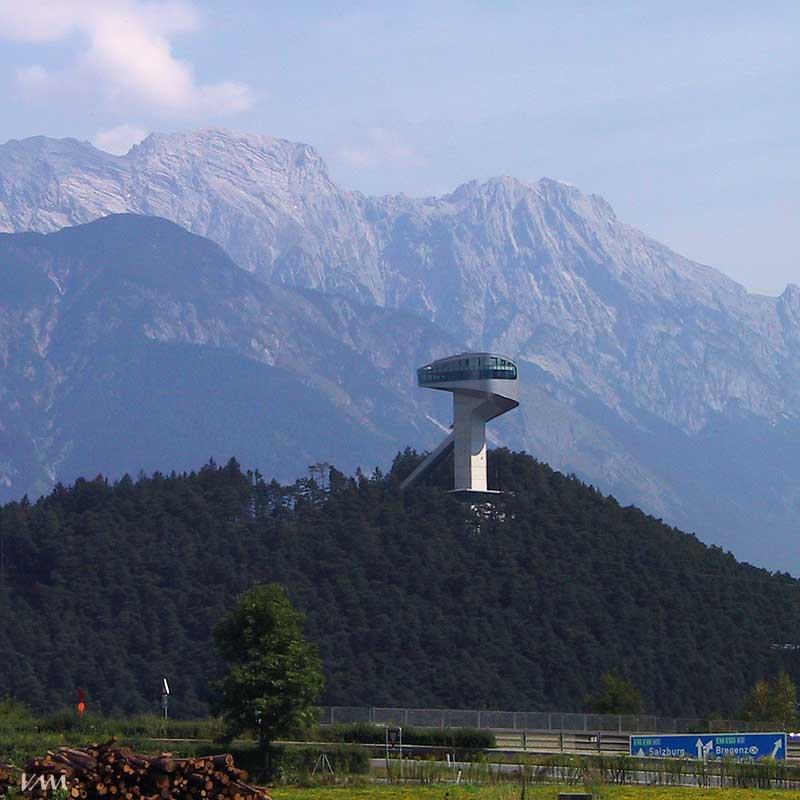
August 2004 view on Bergisel from the Brenner Pass Road

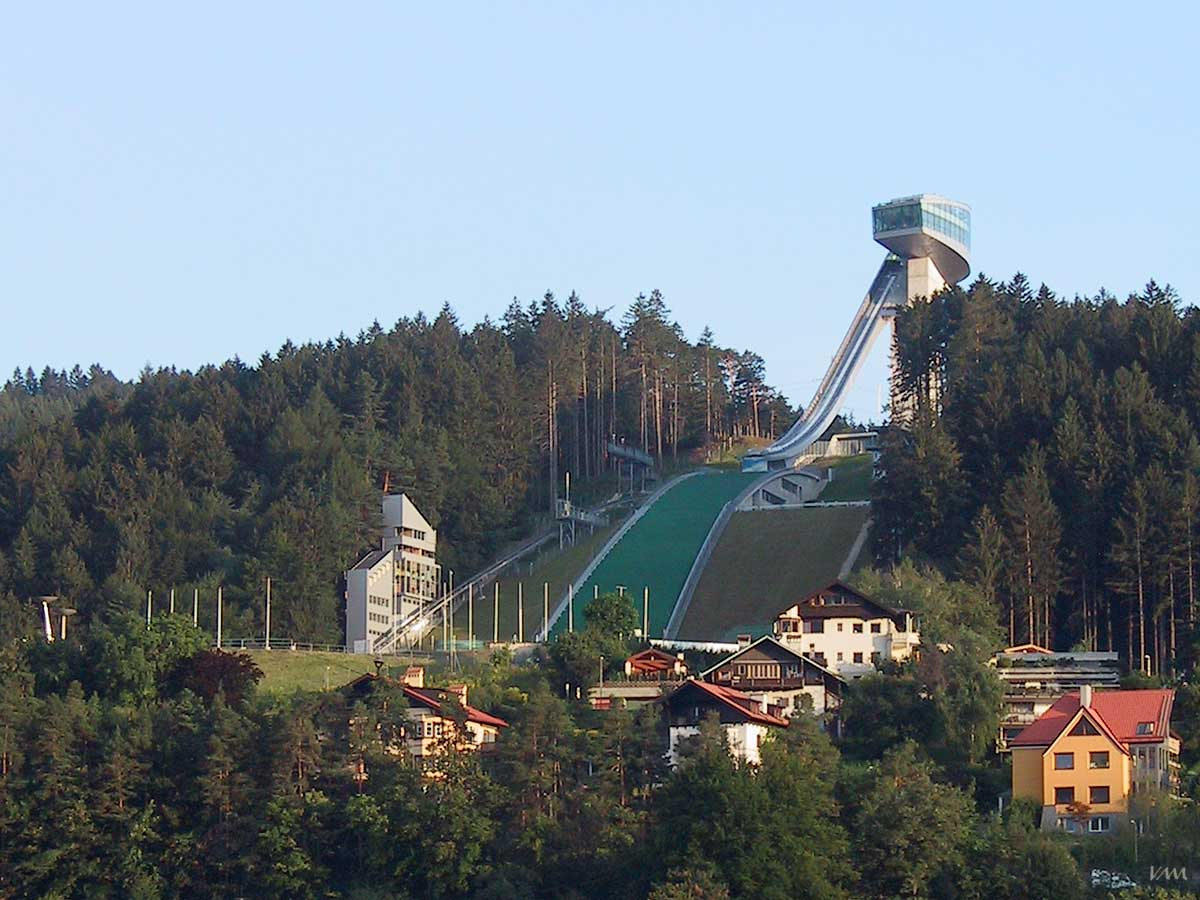
August 2004 view on Bergisel from the North

The Bergisel is a hill (746 m) that lies to the south of Innsbruck, Austria, in the area of Wilten, where the Sill river meets the Inn Valley.

The word's first syllable Berg- doesn't correspond etymologically to the German word Berg with the meaning mountain. The Bergisel's contemporary name is derived from the pre-Roman word burgusinus (elevated position), which then altered through folk etymology, causing the occasional spelling Berg Isel or its English equivalent Mount Isel.

Among its earlier uses were as a cremation site and as a habitation area during the Iron Age.

In 1809, Bergisel was the site of the four Battles of Bergisel under the command of the freedom fighter Andreas Hofer. In 1892, the Andreas Hofer monument was erected in order to commemorate the battles.

Since 1952, Innsbruck has hosted one leg of the Four Hills Tournament. The Bergiselschanze was built of concrete for the 1964 Winter Olympics to replace an older, smaller ramp. It was also used for the 1976 Winter Olympics. A new ramp was opened in 2003, designed by the architect Zaha Hadid, as the old one no longer conformed to contemporary requirements of ski jumping.

Until an accident following a mass panic, which resulted in several deaths, the Bergisel stadium was also the site of the Air & Style snowboard festival.

Both the Brenner railway and the Brennerautobahn have tunnels below the Bergisel. The Sill Gorge, a recreational site, is located at its base.

The Bergisel can be reached by the Stubaitalbahn from Innsbruck, exiting at Station Sonnenburgerhof, or by the Tram 1, at Station Bergisel.
