= FIS Nordic World Ski Championships 2021 – Men's individual large hill =

Men's individual large hill at the FIS Nordic World Ski Championships 2021
- Location: Oberstdorf, Germany
- Dates: 4 March (qualification); 5 March
- Competitors: 61 from 17 nations
- Winning time: 276.5

Medalists
gold medal	Stefan Kraft	Austria
silver medal	Robert Johansson	Norway
bronze medal	Karl Geiger	Germany

The Men's individual large hill competition at the FIS Nordic World Ski Championships 2021 was held on 5 March. A qualification was held on 4 March 2021.

== Results ==
=== Qualification ===
The qualification was held on 4 March 2021 at 17:30.

Rank	Bib	Name	Country	Distance (m)	Points	Notes
1	47	Stefan Kraft	Austria	127.0	143.5	Q
2	45	Johann André Forfang	Norway	133.5	142.2	Q
3	62	Markus Eisenbichler	Germany	127.5	140.8	Q
4	57	Piotr Żyła	Poland	127.0	140.7	Q
5	46	Keiichi Sato	Japan	128.5	139.5	Q
6	41	Peter Prevc	Slovenia	129.0	137.4	Q
7	50	Daniel Huber	Austria	127.0	136.6	Q
8	56	Ryoyu Kobayashi	Japan	126.0	136.2	Q
9	59	Dawid Kubacki	Poland	124.0	135.2	Q
10	44	Philipp Aschenwald	Austria	130.0	135.0	Q
11	55	Marius Lindvik	Norway	126.5	134.7	Q
12	54	Karl Geiger	Germany	125.0	133.9	Q
13	61	Kamil Stoch	Poland	121.5	130.6	Q
14	42	Gregor Deschwanden	Switzerland	128.0	129.9	Q
15	52	Yukiya Sato	Japan	123.0	129.3	Q
16	60	Robert Johansson	Norway	121.5	128.5	Q
17	58	Anže Lanišek	Slovenia	118.5	127.7	Q
18	49	Andrzej Stękała	Poland	121.5	127.3	Q
19	40	Severin Freund	Germany	122.5	127.0	Q
20	53	Daniel-André Tande	Norway	120.0	123.6	Q
21	32	Cene Prevc	Slovenia	119.0	123.4	Q
22	51	Pius Paschke	Germany	120.5	121.6	Q
23	30	Artti Aigro	Estonia	123.0	120.9	Q
24	31	Niko Kytösaho	Finland	119.5	118.2	Q
25	38	Mackenzie Boyd-Clowes	Canada	117.0	115.1	Q
26	48	Bor Pavlovčič	Slovenia	115.0	114.9	Q
27	43	Martin Hamann	Germany	119.5	114.7	Q
28	28	Vladimir Zografski	Bulgaria	115.0	111.6	Q
29	8	Sergey Tkachenko	Kazakhstan	118.0	111.3	Q
30	34	Simon Ammann	Switzerland	113.5	110.6	Q
31	29	Dominik Peter	Switzerland	116.5	110.4	Q
32	33	Jan Hörl	Austria	107.0	106.7	Q
33	36	Evgeni Klimov	Russian Ski Federation	110.0	106.6	Q
34	35	Antti Aalto	Finland	109.5	104.5	Q
35	25	Viktor Polášek	Czech Republic	110.0	103.8	Q
36	37	Junshirō Kobayashi	Japan	105.5	100.6	Q
37	15	Andrew Urlaub	United States	108.5	94.9	Q
38	9	Vojtěch Štursa	Czech Republic	105.5	90.5	Q
39	26	Denis Kornilov	Russian Ski Federation	105.0	90.3	Q
40	18	Vitaliy Kalinichenko	Ukraine	100.0	85.7	Q
41	23	Čestmír Kožíšek	Czech Republic	101.0	85.2	Q
42	10	Andrei Feldorean	Romania	104.0	85.1	Q
43	12	Eetu Nousiainen	Finland	101.0	84.1	Q
44	27	Danil Sadreev	Russian Ski Federation	103.0	82.4	Q
45	14	Yevhen Marusiak	Ukraine	98.5	81.6	Q
46	39	Mikhail Nazarov	Russian Ski Federation	97.5	79.5	Q
47	16	Filip Sakala	Czech Republic	97.5	77.6	Q
48	24	Casey Larson	United States	94.5	77.2	Q
49	17	Danil Vassilyev	Kazakhstan	92.5	73.6	Q
50	22	Matthew Soukup	Canada	96.5	70.3	Q
51	1	Arttu Pohjola	Finland	93.5	69.5	
52	21	Kevin Maltsev	Estonia	87.0	66.2	
53	20	Daniel Cacina	Romania	92.5	66.0	
54	2	Erik Belshaw	United States	92.5	64.3	
55	7	Decker Dean	United States	88.0	64.0	
56	13	Mihnea Spulber	Romania	89.0	63.5	
57	5	Nicolae Mitrofan	Romania	89.5	58.7	
58	4	Nikita Devyatkin	Kazakhstan	85.5	49.4	
59	11	Andrii Vaskul	Ukraine	77.5	42.4	
60	19	Sabirzhan Muminov	Kazakhstan	82.0	39.5	
	6	Anton Korchuk	Ukraine	Disqualified		
	3	Andreas Schuler	Switzerland	Not permitted to start		

=== Final ===
The first round was started on 5 March at 17:00 and the final round at 18:10.

Rank	Bib	Name	Country	Round 1			Final round			Total
Rank	Bib	Name	Country	Distance (m)	Points	Rank	Distance (m)	Points	Rank	Points
1st place, gold medalist(s)	35	Stefan Kraft	Austria	132.5	137.8	1	134.0	138.7	3	276.5
2nd place, silver medalist(s)	48	Robert Johansson	Norway	129.5	132.1	2	135.5	140.0	1	272.1
3rd place, bronze medalist(s)	42	Karl Geiger	Germany	132.0	127.7	6	132.0	139.7	2	267.4
4	45	Piotr Żyła	Poland	130.5	128.4	5	137.0	136.0	4	264.4
5	46	Anže Lanišek	Slovenia	126.5	124.6	10	136.5	133.9	5	258.5
6	43	Marius Lindvik	Norway	126.5	124.3	11	131.5	132.9	6	257.2
7	40	Yukiya Sato	Japan	134.0	128.7	4	130.5	128.0	8	256.7
8	38	Daniel Huber	Austria	133.5	131.7	3	123.5	123.6	11	255.3
9	20	Cene Prevc	Slovenia	129.5	125.1	8	129.5	128.1	7	253.2
10	21	Jan Hörl	Austria	127.0	117.7	18	136.5	127.7	9	245.4
11	32	Philipp Aschenwald	Austria	123.5	117.1	19	130.0	126.5	10	243.6
12	41	Daniel-André Tande	Norway	131.0	123.6	12	120.5	113.8	15	237.4
13	34	Keiichi Sato	Japan	126.5	121.3	14	128.0	114.6	14	235.9
13	33	Johann André Forfang	Norway	128.5	119.6	15	123.5	116.3	13	235.9
15	47	Dawid Kubacki	Poland	130.5	125.1	8	119.0	110.7	19	235.8
16	29	Peter Prevc	Slovenia	126.5	122.6	13	129.5	110.9	17	233.5
17	50	Markus Eisenbichler	Germany	122.5	118.5	16	134.0	113.3	16	231.8
18	39	Pius Paschke	Germany	129.5	125.6	7	114.5	105.6	22	231.2
19	49	Kamil Stoch	Poland	120.0	112.9	22	129.5	117.1	12	230.0
20	30	Gregor Deschwanden	Switzerland	124.0	118.0	17	126.0	110.9	17	228.9
21	37	Andrzej Stękała	Poland	121.5	109.7	24	122.5	109.5	20	219.2
22	28	Severin Freund	Germany	122.5	114.7	20	118.5	103.5	26	218.2
23	24	Evgeni Klimov	Russian Ski Federation	121.0	111.4	23	126.0	104.4	23	215.8
24	31	Martin Hamann	Germany	121.5	109.4	25	123.0	106.0	21	215.4
25	18	Artti Aigro	Estonia	131.0	113.9	21	120.0	97.3	29	211.2
26	22	Simon Ammann	Switzerland	118.0	106.6	26	114.5	104.4	23	211.0
27	14	Denis Kornilov	Russian Ski Federation	123.0	104.7	27	118.0	103.1	27	207.8
28	26	Mackenzie Boyd-Clowes	Canada	116.0	97.0	30	122.0	104.3	25	201.3
29	9	Vitaliy Kalinichenko	Ukraine	119.5	98.2	29	126.0	102.2	28	200.4
30	19	Niko Kytösaho	Finland	116.5	98.9	28	120.5	95.0	30	193.9
31	23	Antti Aalto	Finland	113.0	94.8	31	did not qualify			
32	25	Junshirō Kobayashi	Japan	114.0	93.9	32	did not qualify			
33	17	Dominik Peter	Switzerland	114.5	92.4	33	did not qualify			
34	44	Ryoyu Kobayashi	Japan	117.5	90.3	34	did not qualify			
35	27	Mikhail Nazarov	Russian Ski Federation	112.0	84.6	35	did not qualify			
36	11	Čestmír Kožíšek	Czech Republic	112.5	83.7	36	did not qualify			
37	16	Vladimir Zografski	Bulgaria	109.5	82.7	37	did not qualify			
38	4	Eetu Nousiainen	Finland	110.0	81.3	38	did not qualify			
39	5	Yevhen Marusiak	Ukraine	109.0	70.9	39	did not qualify			
40	1	Sergey Tkachenko	Kazakhstan	103.0	69.2	40	did not qualify			
41	2	Vojtěch Štursa	Czech Republic	105.5	67.6	41	did not qualify			
42	7	Filip Sakala	Czech Republic	103.5	65.1	42	did not qualify			
43	15	Danil Sadreev	Russian Ski Federation	102.5	64.9	43	did not qualify			
44	10	Matthew Soukup	Canada	102.0	63.3	44	did not qualify			
45	3	Andrei Feldorean	Romania	101.0	59.7	45	did not qualify			
46	13	Viktor Polášek	Czech Republic	102.5	59.2	46	did not qualify			
47	8	Danil Vassilyev	Kazakhstan	99.0	55.1	47	did not qualify			
48	12	Casey Larson	United States	93.5	52.5	48	did not qualify			
49	6	Andrew Urlaub	United States	93.0	43.1	49	did not qualify			
	36	Bor Pavlovčič	Slovenia	Disqualified			did not qualify			
