= FIS Nordic World Ski Championships 2021 – Men's individual normal hill =

Men's individual normal hill at the FIS Nordic World Ski Championships 2021
- Location: Oberstdorf, Germany
- Dates: 26 February (qualification); 27 February
- Competitors: 66 from 18 nations
- Winning points: 268.8

Medalists
gold medal	Piotr Żyła	Poland
silver medal	Karl Geiger	Germany
bronze medal	Anže Lanišek	Slovenia

The Men's individual normal hill competition at the FIS Nordic World Ski Championships 2021 was held on 27 February. A qualification was held on 26 February 2021.

== Results ==
=== Qualification ===
The qualification was held on 26 February at 20:30.

Rank	Bib	Name	Country	Distance (m)	Points	Notes
1	66	Halvor Egner Granerud	Norway	105.5	144.2	Q
2	61	Anže Lanišek	Slovenia	103.0	137.4	Q
3	50	Stefan Kraft	Austria	101.5	134.4	Q
4	56	Daniel-André Tande	Norway	102.5	133.6	Q
5	55	Yukiya Satō	Japan	104.5	131.8	Q
6	64	Kamil Stoch	Poland	101.0	131.6	Q
7	62	Dawid Kubacki	Poland	100.5	131.5	Q
8	48	Philipp Aschenwald	Austria	100.0	129.2	Q
9	58	Marius Lindvik	Norway	98.0	128.0	Q
10	30	Danil Sadreev	Russian Ski Federation	102.5	127.3	Q
11	57	Karl Geiger	Germany	97.5	126.9	Q
12	63	Robert Johansson	Norway	100.5	126.8	Q
13	47	Michael Hayböck	Austria	98.5	125.5	Q
14	65	Markus Eisenbichler	Germany	100.0	124.9	Q
15	60	Piotr Żyła	Poland	97.0	123.6	Q
16	54	Pius Paschke	Germany	99.0	123.3	Q
17	59	Ryōyū Kobayashi	Japan	96.5	123.2	Q
18	49	Keiichi Sato	Japan	98.0	122.6	Q
19	42	Constantin Schmid	Germany	96.5	121.7	Q
20	36	Cene Prevc	Slovenia	96.5	120.5	Q
21	46	Gregor Deschwanden	Switzerland	96.0	120.4	Q
22	33	Dominik Peter	Switzerland	99.0	119.6	Q
23	37	Simon Ammann	Switzerland	97.0	119.5	Q
24	35	Niko Kytösaho	Finland	100.5	119.4	Q
25	44	Klemens Murańka	Poland	96.0	119.2	Q
26	38	Antti Aalto	Finland	96.0	118.7	Q
27	45	Žiga Jelar	Slovenia	94.0	116.4	Q
28	29	Denis Kornilov	Russian Ski Federation	97.5	116.2	Q
29	52	Andrzej Stękała	Poland	95.0	116.1	Q
30	40	Junshirō Kobayashi	Japan	95.0	115.7	Q
31	51	Bor Pavlovčič	Slovenia	93.5	115.6	Q
32	28	Viktor Polášek	Czech Republic	95.5	115.2	Q
33	41	Mackenzie Boyd-Clowes	Canada	94.0	114.5	Q
34	34	Artti Aigro	Estonia	96.5	113.7	Q
35	26	Čestmír Kožíšek	Czech Republic	93.5	111.1	Q
36	22	Vojtěch Štursa	Czech Republic	93.0	110.2	Q
36	15	Decker Dean	United States	90.5	110.2	Q
38	39	Evgeni Klimov	Russian Ski Federation	91.0	109.8	Q
39	1	Vitaliy Kalinichenko	Ukraine	92.0	108.1	Q
40	32	Vladimir Zografski	Bulgaria	93.0	107.5	Q
41	13	Sergey Tkachenko	Kazakhstan	90.0	106.7	Q
42	43	Mikhail Nazarov	Russian Ski Federation	90.5	105.8	Q
43	53	Daniel Huber	Austria	90.0	105.5	Q
44	21	Andreas Schuler	Switzerland	90.5	105.3	Q
45	11	Sabirzhan Muminov	Kazakhstan	88.5	105.0	Q
46	10	Eetu Nousiainen	Finland	88.0	104.7	Q
47	27	Casey Larson	United States	89.5	103.9	Q
48	31	Giovanni Bresadola	Italy	90.0	101.4	Q
49	14	Daniel Moroder	Italy	87.0	97.5	Q
50	5	Danil Vassilyev	Kazakhstan	88.5	97.4	Q
50	3	Filip Sakala	Czech Republic	88.5	97.4	Q
52	7	Kevin Maltsev	Estonia	83.5	94.1	
53	24	Matthew Soukup	Canada	85.5	92.2	
54	4	Daniel Cacina	Romania	86.0	91.7	
55	2	Francesco Cecon	Italy	86.0	89.6	
56	8	Yevhen Marusiak	Ukraine	82.0	86.5	
57	6	Andrew Urlaub	United States	81.5	86.0	
58	17	Nicolae Mitrofan	Romania	80.0	84.9	
59	18	Erik Belshaw	United States	78.0	82.1	
60	12	Andrii Vaskul	Ukraine	77.0	76.7	
61	19	Andrei Feldorean	Romania	76.0	76.0	
62	25	Alex Insam	Italy	77.0	74.0	
63	23	Nikita Devyatkin	Kazakhstan	76.5	73.2	
64	9	Mihnea Spulber	Romania	74.5	68.5	
65	20	Anton Korchuk	Ukraine	70.5	61.8	
	16	Jarkko Määttä	Finland	Disqualified		

=== Final ===
The first round was started on 27 February at 16:30 and the final round at 17:40.

Rank	Bib	Name	Country	Round 1			Final round			Total
Rank	Bib	Name	Country	Distance (m)	Points	Rank	Distance (m)	Points	Rank	Points
1st place, gold medalist(s)	45	Piotr Żyła	Poland	105.0	138.7	1	102.5	130.1	2	268.8
2nd place, silver medalist(s)	42	Karl Geiger	Germany	103.5	135.5	4	102.0	129.7	3	265.2
3rd place, bronze medalist(s)	46	Anže Lanišek	Slovenia	102.5	135.7	2	101.0	125.8	5	261.5
4	51	Halvor Egner Granerud	Norway	99.0	128.3	16	103.0	131.4	1	259.7
5	47	Dawid Kubacki	Poland	102.0	135.0	5	99.0	122.1	8	257.1
6	48	Robert Johansson	Norway	100.0	129.7	13	101.0	126.8	4	256.5
7	32	Michael Hayböck	Austria	101.0	131.5	9	97.5	122.4	7	253.9
8	36	Bor Pavlovčič	Slovenia	101.5	130.5	11	98.0	122.9	6	253.4
9	41	Daniel-André Tande	Norway	101.0	131.2	10	98.0	120.4	11	251.6
10	35	Stefan Kraft	Austria	100.5	129.3	15	97.5	121.9	9	251.2
11	39	Pius Paschke	Germany	103.0	133.7	6	95.0	117.2	13	250.9
12	33	Philipp Aschenwald	Austria	100.0	129.9	12	98.0	120.1	12	250.0
12	44	Ryōyū Kobayashi	Japan	104.0	135.6	3	96.5	114.4	16	250.0
14	43	Marius Lindvik	Norway	102.0	133.6	7	94.5	114.9	14	248.5
15	21	Cene Prevc	Slovenia	102.0	124.9	20	98.0	121.1	10	246.0
16	40	Yukiya Satō	Japan	104.0	132.6	8	95.0	111.7	22	244.3
17	50	Markus Eisenbichler	Germany	98.5	129.6	14	95.5	111.5	24	241.1
18	24	Evgeni Klimov	Russian Ski Federation	103.0	126.2	17	95.0	113.4	19	239.6
19	38	Daniel Huber	Austria	99.5	125.8	18	94.5	113.6	17	239.4
20	22	Simon Ammann	Switzerland	103.5	125.3	19	95.0	111.7	22	237.0
21	34	Keiichi Sato	Japan	98.0	123.5	21	95.5	113.3	20	236.8
22	49	Kamil Stoch	Poland	96.0	121.2	23	96.0	114.8	15	236.0
23	27	Constantin Schmid	Germany	97.5	119.6	25	92.5	113.6	17	233.2
24	31	Gregor Deschwanden	Switzerland	97.5	121.6	22	94.0	110.8	25	232.4
25	15	Danil Sadreev	Russian Ski Federation	99.5	115.4	30	94.5	112.4	21	227.8
26	20	Niko Kytösaho	Finland	98.5	119.4	26	91.0	106.0	27	225.4
27	23	Antti Aalto	Finland	100.5	119.9	24	88.5	105.0	28	224.9
28	30	Žiga Jelar	Slovenia	96.0	118.7	27	90.5	104.8	29	223.5
29	25	Junshirō Kobayashi	Japan	97.5	116.7	28	92.0	106.5	26	223.2
30	37	Andrzej Stękała	Poland	95.0	115.6	29	87.5	96.0	30	211.6
31	18	Dominik Peter	Switzerland	96.5	114.7	31	did not qualify			
32	11	Čestmír Kožíšek	Czech Republic	96.5	113.5	32	did not qualify			
33	8	Decker Dean	United States	96.5	112.2	33	did not qualify			
34	26	Mackenzie Boyd-Clowes	Canada	94.5	109.0	34	did not qualify			
35	10	Vojtěch Štursa	Czech Republic	94.0	108.5	35	did not qualify			
36	29	Klemens Murańka	Poland	93.0	108.0	36	did not qualify			
37	28	Mikhail Nazarov	Russian Ski Federation	92.0	107.6	37	did not qualify			
38	14	Denis Kornilov	Russian Ski Federation	93.0	106.5	38	did not qualify			
38	13	Viktor Polášek	Czech Republic	93.0	106.5	38	did not qualify			
40	6	Sergey Tkachenko	Kazakhstan	93.5	105.4	40	did not qualify			
41	19	Artti Aigro	Estonia	92.5	104.9	41	did not qualify			
42	9	Andreas Schuler	Switzerland	93.0	104.7	42	did not qualify			
43	17	Vladimir Zografski	Bulgaria	92.5	103.7	43	did not qualify			
44	1	Vitaliy Kalinichenko	Ukraine	90.5	103.2	44	did not qualify			
45	5	Sabirzhan Muminov	Kazakhstan	90.5	100.1	45	did not qualify			
46	12	Casey Larson	United States	90.5	99.4	46	did not qualify			
47	16	Giovanni Bresadola	Italy	89.5	96.1	47	did not qualify			
48	2	Filip Sakala	Czech Republic	84.0	88.1	48	did not qualify			
49	3	Danil Vassilyev	Kazakhstan	79.0	76.6	49	did not qualify			
50	4	Eetu Nousiainen	Finland	88.0	75.0	50	did not qualify			
51	7	Daniel Moroder	Italy	81.0	74.8	51	did not qualify			
