= FIS Nordic World Ski Championships 2021 – Men's team large hill =

Men's team large hill at the FIS Nordic World Ski Championships 2021
- Location: Oberstdorf, Germany
- Date: 6 March
- Competitors: 56 from 14 nations
- Teams: 14
- Winning time: 1046.6

Medalists
| gold medal | Pius Paschke; Severin Freund; Markus Eisenbichler; Karl Geiger | Germany |
| silver medal | Philipp Aschenwald; Jan Hörl; Daniel Huber; Stefan Kraft | Austria |
| bronze medal | Piotr Żyła; Andrzej Stękała; Kamil Stoch; Dawid Kubacki | Poland |

The Men's team large hill competition at the FIS Nordic World Ski Championships 2021 was held on 6 March 2021.

== Results ==
The first round was started at 17:00 and the final round at 18:16.

| Rank | Bib | Country | Round 1 | | | Final round | | | Total |
| Rank | Bib | Country | Distance (m) | Points | Rank | Distance (m) | Points | Rank | Points |
|---|---|---|---|---|---|---|---|---|---|
| 1st place, gold medalist(s) | 12 | Germany; Pius Paschke; Severin Freund; Markus Eisenbichler; Karl Geiger | 136.5; 127.5; 135.0; 133.5 | 505.0; 134.3; 113.8; 126.1; 130.8 | 1 | 132.0; 123.0; 138.5; 136.0 | 541.6; 132.3; 118.3; 144.5; 146.5 | 1 | 1046.6 |
| 2nd place, silver medalist(s) | 11 | Austria; Philipp Aschenwald; Jan Hörl; Daniel Huber; Stefan Kraft | 138.5; 136.0; 129.0; 130.0 | 501.3; 136.2; 127.5; 114.0; 123.6 | 2 | 136.0; 126.5; 130.5; 133.0 | 534.2; 138.8; 125.4; 128.6; 141.4 | 3 | 1035.5 |
| 3rd place, bronze medalist(s) | 13 | Poland; Piotr Żyła; Andrzej Stękała; Kamil Stoch; Dawid Kubacki | 139.0; 122.5; 133.0; 131.0 | 493.9; 139.7; 105.9; 121.1; 127.2 | 3 | 139.0; 127.0; 132.5; 127.5 | 537.3; 146.0; 126.5; 134.7; 130.1 | 2 | 1031.2 |
| 4 | 9 | Japan; Yukiya Satō; Naoki Nakamura; Keiichi Sato; Ryoyu Kobayashi | 141.0; 129.5; 128.5; 135.5 | 492.2; 139.1; 114.0; 111.4; 127.7 | 4 | 137.0; 126.5; 130.0; 128.5 | 525.3; 140.6; 126.5; 128.0; 130.2 | 4 | 1017.5 |
| 5 | 10 | Slovenia; Cene Prevc; Peter Prevc; Domen Prevc; Anže Lanišek | 129.0; 135.5; 129.5; 134.0 | 486.4; 119.6; 121.9; 116.0; 128.9 | 5 | 126.5; 126.0; 135.0; 133.5 | 523.6; 122.8; 123.9; 136.4; 140.5 | 5 | 1010.0 |
| 6 | 14 | Norway; Marius Lindvik; Daniel-André Tande; Johann André Forfang; Robert Johansson | 117.0; 119.5; 136.0; 129.5 | 453.8; 103.9; 99.1; 124.5; 126.3 | 6 | 133.0; 124.5; 128.0; 134.0 | 520.3; 135.3; 119.3; 125.3; 140.4 | 6 | 974.1 |
| 7 | 8 | Switzerland; Dominik Peter; Andreas Schuler; Simon Ammann; Gregor Deschwanden | 129.0; 109.0; 127.5; 129.0 | 411.6; 115.7; 69.5; 111.0; 115.4 | 7 | 123.5; 108.0; 129.0; 122.5 | 445.0; 115.4; 86.5; 124.3; 118.8 | 7 | 856.6 |
| 8 | 7 | Russian Ski Federation; Evgeni Klimov; Mikhail Nazarov; Ilya Mankov; Denis Kornilov | 117.0; 122.5; 110.0; 119.5 | 363.7; 94.6; 103.1; 74.1; 91.9 | 8 | 121.0; 122.0; 110.5; 118.5 | 414.5; 107.5; 114.5; 83.7; 108.8 | 8 | 778.2 |
| 9 | 6 | Finland; Niko Kytösaho; Antti Aalto; Arttu Pohjola; Eetu Nousiainen | 118.0; 118.0; 104.0; 120.5 | 344.6; 92.1; 93.0; 64.3; 95.2 | 9 | Did not qualify | | | |
| 10 | 4 | United States; Andrew Urlaub; Erik Belshaw; Casey Larson; Decker Dean | 99.5; 90.0; 95.5; 120.0 | 237.4; 52.6; 41.3; 45.8; 97.7 | 10 | Did not qualify | | | |
| 11 | 5 | Czech Republic; Vojtěch Štursa; Viktor Polášek; Filip Sakala; Čestmír Kožíšek | 102.5; 99.0; 95.0; 107.5 | 226.5; 59.1; 56.3; 42.2; 68.9 | 11 | Did not qualify | | | |
| 12 | 1 | Romania; Andrei Feldorean; Mihnea Spulber; Nicolae Mitrofan; Daniel Cacina | 119.5; 79.5; 97.0; 103.0 | 219.8; 94.7; 14.8; 47.6; 62.7 | 12 | Did not qualify | | | |
| 13 | 2 | Ukraine; Yevhen Marusiak; Anton Korchuk; Andrii Vaskul; Vitaliy Kalinichenko | 90.0; 82.0; 96.5; 115.0 | 200.8; 44.9; 18.9; 49.6; 87.4 | 13 | Did not qualify | | | |
| 14 | 3 | Kazakhstan; Nurshat Tursunzhanov; Sabirzhan Muminov; Danil Vassilyev; Sergey Tkachenko | 82.5; 107.0; 97.0; 95.5 | 189.5; 20.6; 73.8; 52.5; 42.6 | 14 | Did not qualify | | | |
