= FIS Ski Flying World Championships 2020 – Individual =

Individual at the FIS Ski Flying World Championships 2020
- Venue: Letalnica bratov Gorišek HS240
- Location: Planica, Slovenia
- Dates: 10 December (qualification); 11–12 December
- Competitors: 40 from 14 nations
- Winning points: 877.2

Medalists
gold medal	Karl Geiger	Germany
silver medal	Halvor Egner Granerud	Norway
bronze medal	Markus Eisenbichler	Germany

The Individual competition at the FIS Ski Flying World Championships 2020 was held on 11 and 12 December 2020, with the qualification being held on 10 December.

Karl Geiger won the competition for the first time, with Halvor Egner Granerud winning silver and Markus Eisenbichler capturing the bronze medal.

== Qualification ==
The training was held on 10 December 2020 at 16:00.

Rank	Bib	Name	Country	Distance (m)	Points	Notes
1	60	Markus Eisenbichler	Germany	222.5	222.5	Q
2	29	Michael Hayböck	Austria	242.5	216.0	Q
3	61	Halvor Egner Granerud	Norway	221.5	215.6	Q
4	56	Karl Geiger	Germany	228.0	215.4	Q
5	32	Daniel-André Tande	Norway	229.5	215.3	Q
6	45	Kamil Stoch	Poland	226.0	212.0	Q
7	59	Robert Johansson	Norway	222.0	211.7	Q
8	58	Yukiya Satō	Japan	219.5	206.9	Q
9	55	Piotr Żyła	Poland	223.0	206.1	Q
9	54	Pius Paschke	Germany	221.0	206.1	Q
11	52	Bor Pavlovčič	Slovenia	220.0	202.8	Q
12	57	Dawid Kubacki	Poland	216.0	201.3	Q
13	34	Andrzej Stękała	Poland	217.5	200.9	Q
14	39	Timi Zajc	Slovenia	216.0	198.7	Q
15	31	Philipp Aschenwald	Austria	217.5	198.2	Q
16	53	Anže Lanišek	Slovenia	214.5	197.9	Q
17	38	Evgeni Klimov	Russia	215.0	196.7	Q
18	42	Sander Vossan Eriksen	Norway	212.0	192.6	Q
19	22	Antti Aalto	Finland	221.5	188.6	Q
20	47	Constantin Schmid	Germany	208.0	187.3	Q
21	8	Domen Prevc	Slovenia	216.5	187.2	Q
22	44	Ryoyu Kobayashi	Japan	208.5	187.0	Q
23	51	Johann André Forfang	Norway	205.0	183.3	Q
24	50	Keiichi Satō	Japan	206.0	182.8	Q
25	27	Artti Aigro	Estonia	211.0	182.4	Q
26	30	Mackenzie Boyd-Clowes	Canada	202.0	177.6	Q
27	24	Naoki Nakamura	Japan	206.5	176.5	Q
28	13	Gregor Schlierenzauer	Austria	206.0	174.8	Q
29	20	Giovanni Bresadola	Italy	201.0	169.0	Q
30	15	Ilya Mankov	Russia	204.0	167.6	Q
31	16	Čestmír Kožíšek	Czech Republic	201.0	166.9	Q
32	28	Mikhail Nazarov	Russia	201.0	166.8	Q
33	21	Timon-Pascal Kahofer	Austria	198.0	165.9	Q
34	18	Casey Larson	United States	200.0	165.8	Q
35	12	Jarkko Määttä	Finland	196.5	164.3	Q
36	3	Matthew Soukup	Canada	192.5	159.5	Q
37	19	Danil Sadreev	Russia	194.5	159.3	Q
38	14	Vitaliy Kalinichenko	Ukraine	195.5	156.8	Q
39	6	Alex Insam	Italy	190.5	151.5	Q
40	9	Eetu Nousiainen	Finland	190.5	150.7	Q
41	10	Dean Decker	United States	188.5	150.6	
42	2	Niko Kytösaho	Finland	184.0	149.5	
43	4	Patrick Gasienica	United States	160.5	113.9	
44	1	Yevhen Marusiak	Ukraine	129.0	78.6	
–	7	Filip Sakala	Czech Republic	DSQ		

== Results ==
The first two rounds were held on 11 December at 16:00 and the last two rounds on 12 December 2020 at 16:00.

Rank	Bib	Name	Country	Round 1			Round 2			Round 3			Final round			Total
Rank	Bib	Name	Country	Distance (m)	Points	Rank	Distance (m)	Points	Rank	Distance (m)	Points	Rank	Distance (m)	Points	Rank	Points
1st place, gold medalist(s)	35	Karl Geiger	Germany	241.0	223.4	1	223.5	207.8	5	240.5	228.0	1	231.5	218.0	3	877.2
2nd place, silver medalist(s)	40	Halvor Egner Granerud	Norway	221.0	209.3	4	229.5	217.3	2	239.0	224.9	2	243.0	225.2	1	876.7
3rd place, bronze medalist(s)	39	Markus Eisenbichler	Germany	220.0	205.4	5	247.0	220.3	1	234.5	217.3	4	230.0	216.3	4	859.3
4	18	Michael Hayböck	Austria	245.5	221.1	2	217.0	201.8	9	237.5	219.1	3	220.5	203.1	9	845.1
5	38	Robert Johansson	Norway	220.0	202.5	7	228.5	208.9	4	228.0	211.5	6	232.0	218.1	2	841.0
6	37	Yukiya Satō	Japan	222.0	203.3	6	229.0	205.6	7	228.0	212.6	5	229.0	213.6	5	835.1
7	34	Piotr Żyła	Poland	221.5	202.1	8	224.5	206.4	6	227.0	211.2	7	224.5	208.9	7	828.6
8	27	Kamil Stoch	Poland	213.0	187.5	13	229.0	211.5	3	223.0	205.7	9	222.5	203.8	8	808.5
9	23	Evgeni Klimov	Russia	237.0	213.8	3	208.0	183.2	20	222.5	203.9	11	220.0	201.3	10	802.2
10	22	Andrzej Stękała	Poland	224.5	201.9	9	215.5	194.6	14	224.5	205.3	10	212.0	190.6	14	792.4
11	33	Pius Paschke	Germany	212.5	193.2	12	224.5	202.5	8	217.0	198.9	12	213.5	196.3	12	790.9
12	32	Anže Lanišek	Slovenia	196.0	172.5	23	218.5	196.4	10	215.5	196.8	13	228.0	211.5	6	777.2
13	21	Daniel-André Tande	Norway	203.0	176.5	19	218.5	195.8	12	224.0	205.9	8	218.0	198.9	11	777.1
14	28	Constantin Schmid	Germany	216.5	193.6	11	219.5	195.8	12	209.0	185.3	16	213.5	193.0	13	767.7
15	36	Dawid Kubacki	Poland	219.0	198.5	10	215.5	196.3	11	211.0	190.9	14	196.0	168.7	28	754.4
16	14	Antti Aalto	Finland	205.0	183.9	15	208.5	187.4	17	208.5	186.2	15	207.5	182.4	15	739.9
17	29	Keiichi Satō	Japan	205.0	178.4	16	217.5	193.2	15	197.5	171.4	25	206.0	180.1	18	723.1
18	20	Philipp Aschenwald	Austria	201.5	174.0	21	218.0	192.7	16	200.5	176.0	22	203.0	177.0	22	719.7
19	26	Ryoyu Kobayashi	Japan	203.0	172.6	22	212.5	187.0	18	202.0	176.6	19	205.0	180.5	17	716.7
20	31	Bor Pavlovčič	Slovenia	207.0	185.8	14	198.0	171.6	24	203.5	180.1	18	203.5	178.0	21	715.5
21	3	Domen Prevc	Slovenia	206.0	176.8	17	206.5	177.0	23	201.5	176.5	20	207.5	182.4	15	712.7
22	30	Johann André Forfang	Norway	202.5	169.8	26	213.0	186.8	19	200.0	174.7	23	205.0	179.1	20	710.4
23	19	Mackenzie Boyd-Clowes	Canada	200.0	167.9	28	212.0	182.6	21	206.0	184.1	17	203.0	175.5	23	710.1
24	12	Giovanni Bresadola	Italy	199.5	176.7	18	202.0	171.2	25	192.0	168.4	27	201.0	173.2	25	689.5
25	16	Artti Aigro	Estonia	200.5	166.5	29	196.5	164.3	28	197.5	176.4	21	207.0	180.1	18	687.3
26	6	Gregor Schlierenzauer	Austria	193.0	172.0	24	199.5	170.5	26	193.0	168.9	26	202.0	174.8	24	686.2
27	1	Matthew Soukup	Canada	204.0	169.2	27	196.5	156.3	29	191.5	165.6	28	200.0	172.9	26	664.0
28	25	Sander Vossan Eriksen	Norway	207.0	174.4	20	208.0	179.7	22	172.5	138.1	29	198.0	171.1	27	663.3
29	17	Mikhail Nazarov	Russia	203.0	166.0	30	178.5	145.9	30	199.5	173.3	24	195.5	166.9	29	652.1
–	24	Timi Zajc	Slovenia	205.0	170.8	25	199.0	168.5	27	did not start						
31	11	Danil Sadreev	Russia	196.0	163.3	31	did not qualify									
32	8	Ilya Mankov	Russia	195.0	162.9	32	did not qualify									
33	9	Čestmír Kožíšek	Czech Republic	194.5	159.7	33	did not qualify									
34	13	Timon-Pascal Kahofer	Austria	181.5	151.4	34	did not qualify									
35	15	Naoki Nakamura	Japan	185.5	151.3	35	did not qualify									
36	4	Eetu Nousiainen	Finland	183.5	148.9	36	did not qualify									
37	5	Jarkko Määttä	Finland	174.5	143.8	37	did not qualify									
38	7	Vitaliy Kalinichenko	Ukraine	178.5	143.4	38	did not qualify									
39	10	Casey Larson	United States	181.5	141.5	39	did not qualify									
40	2	Alex Insam	Italy	179.5	134.3	40	did not qualify									
