= FIS Nordic World Ski Championships 2019 – Men's individual normal hill =

Men's individual normal hill at the FIS Nordic World Ski Championships 2019
- Location: Seefeld in Tirol, Austria
- Dates: 28 February – 1 March
- Competitors: 66 from 21 nations
- Winning points: 218.3

Medalists
gold medal	Dawid Kubacki	Poland
silver medal	Kamil Stoch	Poland
bronze medal	Stefan Kraft	Austria

The Men's individual normal hill competition at the FIS Nordic World Ski Championships 2019 was held on 28 February and 1 March 2019. A qualification was held on 28 February.

== Results ==
=== Qualification ===
The qualification was held on 28 February at 17:00.

Rank	Bib	Name	Country	Distance (m)	Points	Notes
1	64	Stefan Kraft	Austria	106.0	130.9	Q
2	66	Ryōyū Kobayashi	Japan	108.5	127.5	Q
3	65	Kamil Stoch	Poland	107.0	126.1	Q
4	62	Dawid Kubacki	Poland	104.0	123.4	Q
5	54	Evgeniy Klimov	Russia	104.5	122.4	Q
6	46	Michael Hayböck	Austria	101.0	120.3	Q
7	50	Richard Freitag	Germany	104.5	119.9	Q
8	37	Peter Prevc	Slovenia	102.5	118.3	Q
9	58	Markus Eisenbichler	Germany	101.5	117.1	Q
10	52	Killian Peier	Switzerland	100.5	116.9	Q
11	56	Stephan Leyhe	Germany	101.0	116.3	Q
12	48	Yukiya Satō	Japan	101.0	115.8	Q
13	53	Daniel Huber	Austria	101.0	115.5	Q
14	47	Junshirō Kobayashi	Japan	100.5	115.1	Q
15	39	Viktor Polášek	Czech Republic	100.0	113.3	Q
16	63	Piotr Żyła	Poland	99.0	113.1	Q
16	57	Karl Geiger	Germany	100.5	113.1	Q
18	42	Daiki Itō	Japan	104.0	112.9	Q
19	44	Philipp Aschenwald	Austria	99.5	112.0	Q
20	55	Roman Koudelka	Czech Republic	99.0	110.7	Q
21	51	Andreas Stjernen	Norway	98.0	110.4	Q
22	27	Thomas Aasen Markeng	Norway	98.0	108.6	Q
23	61	Robert Johansson	Norway	96.5	106.7	Q
24	49	Antti Aalto	Finland	98.0	106.4	Q
25	45	Simon Ammann	Switzerland	99.5	106.1	Q
26	41	Stefan Hula	Poland	101.5	105.5	Q
27	60	Johann André Forfang	Norway	95.0	104.2	Q
28	38	Jernej Damjan	Slovenia	96.5	103.4	Q
29	32	Mackenzie Boyd-Clowes	Canada	95.0	103.1	Q
30	35	Žiga Jelar	Slovenia	93.5	102.7	Q
31	36	Kevin Bickner	United States	95.0	102.0	Q
32	34	Dmitry Vassiliev	Russia	98.0	101.7	Q
33	5	Sebastian Colloredo	Italy	97.0	101.5	Q
34	59	Timi Zajc	Slovenia	91.5	99.7	Q
35	26	Andreas Alamommo	Finland	101.5	99.5	Q
36	16	Jonathan Learoyd	France	94.0	96.7	Q
37	40	Jan Hörl	Austria	93.5	96.2	Q
38	43	Vladimir Zografski	Bulgaria	91.0	92.7	Q
39	31	Čestmír Kožíšek	Czech Republic	89.5	91.4	Q
40	30	Alex Insam	Italy	90.0	90.5	Q
41	20	Casey Larson	United States	89.0	90.0	Q
42	25	Jarkko Määttä	Finland	93.5	89.7	Q
43	22	Luca Egloff	Switzerland	93.0	89.2	Q
44	29	Roman Trofimov	Russia	86.0	88.4	Q
45	28	Eetu Nousiainen	Finland	90.0	87.6	Q
46	33	Artti Aigro	Estonia	89.0	87.4	Q
47	24	Andreas Schuler	Switzerland	90.0	86.0	Q
48	11	Filip Sakala	Czech Republic	90.5	85.5	Q
49	21	Martti Nõmme	Estonia	92.0	85.1	Q
50	4	Kevin Maltsev	Estonia	87.5	83.5	Q
51	23	Andrew Urlaub	United States	91.5	82.6	
52	18	Matthew Soukup	Canada	85.5	82.3	
53	15	Vitaliy Kalinichenko	Ukraine	88.0	79.3	
54	3	Sergey Tkachenko	Kazakhstan	86.0	78.1	
55	14	Hunor Farkas	Romania	86.5	74.8	
56	17	Patrick Gasienica	United States	83.0	73.2	
57	7	Yevhen Marusiak	Ukraine	80.5	65.2	
58	8	Radu Mihai Pacurar	Romania	78.0	61.1	
59	9	Andrii Vaskul	Ukraine	77.5	58.8	
60	6	Flórián Molnár	Hungary	75.5	54.7	
61	1	Sabirzhan Muminov	Kazakhstan	74.5	53.6	
62	12	Li Chao	China	73.0	52.7	
63	13	Nikita Devyatkin	Kazakhstan	72.5	48.6	
64	19	Nurshat Tursunzhanov	Kazakhstan	66.5	36.6	
—	10	Yang Guang	China	Disqualified		
—	2	Maksim Sergeev	Russia	Disqualified		

=== Final ===
The first round was held on 1 March at 16:00 and the final round at 17:12.

Rank	Bib	Name	Country	Round 1			Final round			Total
Rank	Bib	Name	Country	Distance (m)	Points	Rank	Distance (m)	Points	Rank	Points
1st place, gold medalist(s)	46	Dawid Kubacki	Poland	93.0	85.3	27	104.5	133.0	1	218.3
2nd place, silver medalist(s)	49	Kamil Stoch	Poland	91.5	89.4	18	101.5	126.1	2	215.5
3rd place, bronze medalist(s)	48	Stefan Kraft	Austria	93.5	92.6	10	101.0	122.2	5	214.8
4	28	Philipp Aschenwald	Austria	91.0	89.0	20	103.5	125.5	3	214.5
5	34	Richard Freitag	Germany	93.5	89.1	19	103.5	122.2	5	211.3
6	40	Stephan Leyhe	Germany	96.5	94.7	9	99.0	115.9	12	210.6
7	42	Markus Eisenbichler	Germany	91.0	86.5	25	102.5	124.0	4	210.5
7	32	Yukiya Satō	Japan	92.0	89.7	16	99.0	120.8	8	210.5
9	30	Michael Hayböck	Austria	93.5	91.0	14	100.0	117.5	9	208.5
10	36	Killian Peier	Switzerland	98.5	97.1	4	98.0	110.3	16	207.4
11	22	Jernej Damjan	Slovenia	92.0	89.6	17	98.0	116.5	11	206.1
12	29	Simon Ammann	Switzerland	93.0	88.4	22	100.0	117.4	10	205.8
12	25	Stefan Hula	Poland	88.0	84.3	29	100.0	121.5	7	205.8
14	50	Ryōyū Kobayashi	Japan	101.0	104.5	1	92.5	98.9	23	203.4
15	39	Roman Koudelka	Czech Republic	93.5	88.8	21	97.5	113.7	14	202.5
16	45	Robert Johansson	Norway	97.5	92.5	12	95.0	109.0	17	201.5
17	31	Junshirō Kobayashi	Japan	89.5	85.2	28	97.0	114.2	13	199.4
18	41	Karl Geiger	Germany	100.0	102.4	2	92.5	96.6	24	199.0
19	9	Jarkko Määttä	Finland	88.5	84.3	29	98.0	113.0	15	197.3
20	11	Thomas Aasen Markeng	Norway	92.0	95.1	7	95.0	102.0	21	197.1
21	37	Daniel Huber	Austria	97.0	92.6	10	94.0	104.4	20	197.0
22	2	Sebastian Colloredo	Italy	92.5	90.8	15	93.5	105.6	19	196.4
23	18	Dmitry Vassiliev	Russia	92.5	86.7	24	96.5	105.8	18	192.5
24	21	Peter Prevc	Slovenia	94.5	95.7	5	93.0	96.3	26	192.0
25	35	Andreas Stjernen	Norway	96.5	95.1	7	92.5	96.5	25	191.6
26	4	Jonathan Learoyd	France	90.0	88.1	23	94.0	99.8	22	187.9
27	19	Žiga Jelar	Slovenia	95.5	99.6	3	87.0	86.4	28	186.0
28	5	Casey Larson	United States	92.0	91.3	13	88.0	91.0	27	182.3
29	3	Filip Sakala	Czech Republic	93.0	95.3	6	85.0	80.4	30	175.7
30	1	Kevin Maltsev	Estonia	89.5	85.4	26	84.0	84.4	29	169.8
31	10	Andreas Alamommo	Finland	88.0	84.2	31	did not qualify			
32	16	Mackenzie Boyd-Clowes	Canada	88.0	82.8	32	did not qualify			
33	47	Piotr Żyła	Poland	90.5	82.1	33	did not qualify			
34	26	Daiki Itō	Japan	89.5	81.9	34	did not qualify			
35	38	Evgeniy Klimov	Russia	92.0	81.6	35	did not qualify			
36	7	Luca Egloff	Switzerland	86.0	80.5	36	did not qualify			
37	27	Vladimir Zografski	Bulgaria	87.0	80.1	37	did not qualify			
38	23	Viktor Polášek	Czech Republic	86.5	79.7	38	did not qualify			
39	15	Čestmír Kožíšek	Czech Republic	86.0	79.0	39	did not qualify			
39	13	Roman Trofimov	Russia	84.5	79.0	39	did not qualify			
41	8	Andreas Schuler	Switzerland	86.5	78.7	41	did not qualify			
42	14	Alex Insam	Italy	84.0	74.6	42	did not qualify			
42	12	Eetu Nousiainen	Finland	83.0	74.6	42	did not qualify			
44	24	Jan Hörl	Austria	85.5	74.2	44	did not qualify			
45	44	Johann André Forfang	Norway	84.5	73.5	45	did not qualify			
46	6	Martti Nõmme	Estonia	83.5	73.1	46	did not qualify			
47	33	Antti Aalto	Finland	85.0	72.7	47	did not qualify			
48	20	Kevin Bickner	United States	83.0	71.0	48	did not qualify			
49	17	Artti Aigro	Estonia	83.0	66.5	49	did not qualify			
50	43	Timi Zajc	Slovenia	80.0	62.6	50	did not qualify			
