= Ski jumping at the 2022 Winter Olympics – Mixed team =

Mixed team at the XXIV Olympic Winter Games
- Ski jumping
- Venue: Snow Ruyi, Zhangjiakou
- Date: 7 February 2022
- Competitors: 40 from 10 nations
- Teams: 10
- Winning points: 1,001.5

Medalists
1st place, gold medalist(s)		Nika Križnar; Timi Zajc; Urša Bogataj; Peter Prevc	Slovenia
2nd place, silver medalist(s)		Irma Makhinia; Danil Sadreev; Irina Avvakumova; Evgenii Klimov	ROC
3rd place, bronze medalist(s)		Alexandria Loutitt; Matthew Soukup; Abigail Strate; Mackenzie Boyd-Clowes	Canada

The inaugural Mixed team normal hill competition of the Beijing 2022 Olympics was held on 7 February 2022 at the Snow Ruyi hill in Zhangjiakou.

In July 2018, the International Olympic Committee (IOC) officially added the mixed team event to the Olympic program.

== Summary ==
Germany were the 2021 World champion, with Norway and Austria being the silver and bronze medalists, respectively. Only one mixed team event was held in the framework of the 2021–22 FIS Ski Jumping World Cup before the Olympics; Slovenia won, followed by Norway and Austria.

The event was won by Slovenia, whose first Olympic gold in ski jumping had been won two days earlier by Urša Bogataj, who was also part of the mixed team. Second was the team of the Russian Olympic Committee, and Canada won the bronze medal. For Canada this medal is historic, as it marked the country's first ever medal in ski jumping at the Winter Olympics. For Russia, it was the first medal in ski jumping as a separate state, and the first medal since 1968, when Vladimir Belousov, representing the Soviet Union, won the large hill competition.

Slovenia, represented by Nika Križnar and Urša Bogataj, 2022 medalists, Peter Prevc, the 2014 silver and bronze medalist, and Timi Zajc, was first in both rounds. Germany, considered the favorite, failed to advance to the second round because Katharina Althaus was disqualified for a suit violation. Japan and Austria also had one jumper disqualified in the first round, and Norway, which was second in the first round, had two jumpers disqualified in the second round. These teams, which also featured Olympic medalists, were thus shifted out of medal contention. As a result, the Russian Olympic committee emerged as a surprising silver medalist, and Canada won bronze, only eight points ahead of Japan.

== Schedule ==
=== Competition ===
GMT	Date	Event	Round
10:30 AM	7 February 2022	Trial round	TR
11:45 AM	7 February 2022	1st round	1R
12:50 PM	7 February 2022	Final round	2R

== Results ==
The final started at 19:44.

Rank	Bib	Country	Round 1			Final round			Total
Rank	Bib	Country	Distance (m)	Points	Rank	Distance (m)	Points	Rank	Points
1st place, gold medalist(s)	9; 9–1; 9–2; 9–3; 9–4	Slovenia; Nika Križnar; Timi Zajc; Urša Bogataj; Peter Prevc	101.0; 97.5; 106.0; 101.5	506.4; 126.6; 120.4; 133.1; 126.3	1	99.5; 100.0; 100.0; 101.5	495.1; 121.5; 123.0; 124.3; 126.3	1	1,001.5; 248.1; 243.4; 257.4; 252.6
2nd place, silver medalist(s)	4; 4–1; 4–2; 4–3; 4–4	ROC; Irma Makhinia; Danil Sadreev; Irina Avvakumova; Evgenii Klimov	86.0; 99.5; 92.0; 100.5	448.8; 92.4; 124.1; 105.8; 126.5	3	81.5; 100.5; 91.5; 103.0	441.5; 81.4; 125.8; 103.7; 130.6	4	890.3; 173.8; 249.9; 209.5; 257.1
3rd place, bronze medalist(s)	2; 2–1; 2–2; 2–3; 2–4	Canada; Alexandria Loutitt; Matthew Soukup; Abigail Strate; Mackenzie Boyd-Clowes	84.0; 87.0; 93.5; 101.5	415.4; 87.6; 94.1; 108.3; 125.4	4	90.0; 89.0; 91.5; 101.5	429.2; 101.4; 97.1; 102.6; 128.1	5	844.6; 189.0; 191.2; 210.9; 253.5
4	6; 6–1; 6–2; 6–3; 6–4	Japan; Sara Takanashi; Yukiya Satō; Yuki Ito; Ryōyū Kobayashi	DSQ; 99.5; 93.0; 102.5	359.9; 0.0; 122.9; 106.9; 130.1	8	98.5; 100.5; 88.0; 106.0	476.4; 118.9; 122.7; 97.3; 137.5	2	836.3; 118.9; 245.6; 204.2; 267.6
5	10; 10–1; 10–2; 10–3; 10–4	Austria; Daniela Iraschko-Stolz; Stefan Kraft; Lisa Eder; Manuel Fettner	DSQ; 102.0; 96.0; 101.0	370.7; 0.0; 130.2; 113.1; 127.4	6	84.0; 102.0; 90.5; 102.0	447.3; 86.4; 131.2; 101.8; 127.9	3	818.0; 86.4; 261.4; 214.9; 255.3
6	5; 5–1; 5–2; 5–3; 5–4	Poland; Nicole Konderla; Dawid Kubacki; Kinga Rajda; Kamil Stoch	75.5; 96.0; 80.5; 99.5	386.1; 67.8; 114.6; 78.4; 125.3	5	72.5; 101.0; 73.5; 102.5	377.1; 61.3; 123.6; 61.4; 130.8	6	763.2; 129.1; 238.2; 139.8; 256.1
7	3; 3–1; 3–2; 3–3; 3–4	Czech Republic; Klára Ulrichová; Čestmír Kožíšek; Karolína Indráčková; Roman Koudelka	78.5; 91.0; 78.0; 93.0	362.5; 76.2; 104.5; 74.3; 107.5	7	73.5; 92.5; 83.0; 92.5	360.3; 61.5; 106.8; 84.5; 107.5	7	722.8; 137.7; 211.3; 158.8; 215.0
8	7; 7–1; 7–2; 7–3; 7–4	Norway; Anna Odine Strøm; Robert Johansson; Silje Opseth; Marius Lindvik	92.0; 99.5; 91.0; 102.5	457.4; 104.5; 123.2; 101.4; 128.3	2	DSQ; 100.5; DSQ; 100.5	250.5; 0.0; 124.9; 0.0; 125.6	8	707.9; 104.5; 248.1; 101.4; 253.9
9	8; 8–1; 8–2; 8–3; 8–4	Germany; Selina Freitag; Constantin Schmid; Katharina Althaus; Karl Geiger	88.0; 101.0; DSQ; 101.5	350.9; 95.4; 127.7; 0.0; 127.8	9	did not advance			350.9; 95.4; 127.7; 0.0; 127.8
10	1; 1–1; 1–2; 1–3; 1–4	China; Dong Bing; Song Qiwu; Peng Qingyue; Zhao Jiawen	76.0; 71.5; 65.0; 74.0	229.8; 69.4; 57.7; 42.0; 60.7	10	did not advance			229.8; 69.4; 57.7; 42.0; 60.7
