= FIS Nordic World Ski Championships 2023 – Mixed team normal hill =

Mixed team normal hill at the FIS Nordic World Ski Championships 2023
- Venue: Srednja skakalnica (HS102)
- Location: Planica, Slovenia
- Dates: 26 February
- Competitors: 60 from 15 nations
- Teams: 15
- Winning points: 1017.2

Medalists
gold medal	Selina Freitag; Karl Geiger; Katharina Althaus; Andreas Wellinger	Germany
silver medal	Anna Odine Strøm; Johann André Forfang; Thea Minyan Bjørseth; Halvor Egner Granerud	Norway
bronze medal	Nika Križnar; Timi Zajc; Ema Klinec; Anže Lanišek	Slovenia

The Mixed team normal hill competition at the FIS Nordic World Ski Championships 2023 was held on 26 February 2023.

== Results ==
The first round was started at 17:00 and the final round at 18:35.

Rank	Bib	Country	Round 1			Final round			Total
Rank	Bib	Country	Distance (m)	Points	Rank	Distance (m)	Points	Rank	Points
1st place, gold medalist(s)	13	Germany; Selina Freitag; Karl Geiger; Katharina Althaus; Andreas Wellinger	99.0; 92.5; 94.5; 100.0	501.7; 116.1; 126.0; 130.4; 129.2	2	95.0; 98.0; 102.0; 98.0	515.5; 122.5; 124.2; 135.9; 132.9	1	1017.2
2nd place, silver medalist(s)	14	Norway; Anna Odine Strøm; Johann André Forfang; Thea Minyan Bjørseth; Halvor Egner Granerud	97.0; 92.5; 90.5; 99.0	506.1; 129.0; 127.7; 121.2; 128.2	1	91.0; 98.0; 99.5; 97.5	498.4; 122.9; 122.5; 125.5; 127.5	4	1004.5
3rd place, bronze medalist(s)	12	Slovenia; Nika Križnar; Timi Zajc; Ema Klinec; Anže Lanišek	101.0; 96.5; 88.0; 100.0	501.6; 121.7; 133.7; 113.8; 132.4	3	101.0; 103.0; 91.0; 98.0	498.8; 128.3; 132.2; 110.6; 127.7	3	1000.4
4	15	Austria; Chiara Kreuzer; Jan Hörl; Eva Pinkelnig; Stefan Kraft	93.5; 89.5; 98.0; 95.0	484.6; 112.3; 117.1; 131.2; 124.0	4	97.5; 95.0; 102.0; 98.5	502.9; 122.3; 123.5; 124.4; 132.7	2	987.5
5	11	Japan; Nozomi Maruyama; Naoki Nakamura; Yūki Itō; Ryōyū Kobayashi	98.5; 91.5; 92.5; 94.0	478.0; 116.7; 117.1; 127.2; 117.0	5	99.0; 89.5; 93.0; 95.0	466.9; 119.8; 108.1; 119.3; 119.7	5	944.9
6	8	Finland; Jenny Rautionaho; Antti Aalto; Julia Kykkänen; Niko Kytösaho	87.5; 90.0; 87.5; 91.0	439.0; 105.7; 109.5; 107.7; 116.1	7	92.0; 92.5; 91.0; 95.0	446.5; 113.9; 110.7; 106.0; 115.9	6	885.5
7	6	Switzerland; Emely Torazza; Simon Ammann; Sina Arnet; Gregor Deschwanden	77.5; 95.0; 84.0; 97.0	447.9; 92.0; 131.6; 97.2; 127.1	6	90.0; 94.0; 88.5; 96.5	431.3; 108.4; 108.1; 100.0; 114.8	7	879.2
8	10	Poland; Kinga Rajda; Kamil Stoch; Nicole Konderla; Piotr Żyła	75.0; 97.5; 83.0; 101.0	432.2; 76.5; 128.2; 98.7; 128.8	8	79.5; 92.0; 83.0; 99.5	413.8; 86.8; 113.4; 85.0; 128.6	8	846.0
9	9	Italy; Jessica Malsiner; Giovanni Bresadola; Lara Malsiner; Alex Insam	79.5; 92.0; 87.5; 92.0	431.9; 97.6; 113.0; 112.1; 109.2	9	Did not advance			
10	7	United States; Annika Belshaw; Casey Larson; Paige Jones; Andrew Urlaub	79.0; 89.0; 82.0; 92.0	412.2; 93.8; 114.2; 93.2; 111.0	10	Did not advance			
11	4	China; Li Xueyao; Zhen Weijie; Liu Qi; Song Qiwu	84.5; 85.5; 92.0; 79.0	382.0; 96.3; 86.3; 109.9; 89.5	11	Did not advance			
12	5	Romania; Alessia Mitu-Cosca; Mihnea Spulber; Daniela Haralambie; Daniel Cacina	75.5; 89.5; 87.0; 85.5	375.1; 81.6; 94.3; 97.9; 101.3	12	Did not advance			
13	3	Czech Republic; Karolína Indráčková; Radek Rýdl; Klára Ulrichová; Roman Koudelka	85.0; 83.5; 85.5; 85.0	391.5; 97.2; 97.5; 99.1; 97.7	13	Did not advance			
14	1	Kazakhstan; Mariya Yudakova; Sabirzhan Muminov; Veronika Shishkina; Nikita Devyatkin	66.5; 76.0; 74.0; 89.0	324.0; 61.3; 89.9; 75.2; 97.6	14	Did not advance			
15	2	Ukraine; Zhanna Hlukhova; Yevhen Marusiak; Tetiana Pylypchuk; Vitaliy Kalinichenko	68.0; 79.5; 63.5; 88.0	316.4; 61.4; 94.7; 51.4; 108.9	15	Did not advance			
