= FIS Ski Flying World Championships 2022 – Team =

Team at the FIS Ski Flying World Championships 2022
- Venue: Vikersundbakken HS240
- Location: Vikersund, Norway
- Dates: 13 March
- Competitors: 28 from 7 nations
- Teams: 7
- Winning points: 1,711.5

Medalists
gold medal	Domen Prevc; Peter Prevc; Timi Zajc; Anže Lanišek	Slovenia
silver medal	Severin Freund; Andreas Wellinger; Markus Eisenbichler; Karl Geiger	Germany
bronze medal	Johann André Forfang; Daniel-André Tande; Halvor Egner Granerud; Marius Lindvik	Norway

The Team competition at the FIS Ski Flying World Championships 2022 was held on 13 March 2022.

Slovenia won, ahead of Germany and Norway.

== Results ==
The first round started at 16:30 and the final round at 17:30.

Rank	Bib	Country	Round 1			Final round			Total
Rank	Bib	Country	Distance (m)	Points	Rank	Distance (m)	Points	Rank	Points
1st place, gold medalist(s)	4	Slovenia; Domen Prevc; Peter Prevc; Timi Zajc; Anže Lanišek	222.0; 231.0; 229.5; 234.0	863.1; 207.5; 212.3; 217.7; 225.6	1	217.0; 221.5; 228.5; 228.5	848.4; 203.0; 209.0; 225.2; 211.2	1	1,711.5
2nd place, silver medalist(s)	6	Germany; Severin Freund; Andreas Wellinger; Markus Eisenbichler; Karl Geiger	211.5; 226.5; 211.5; 222.0	799.7; 196.4; 206.7; 184.6; 212.0	2	201.0; 206.5; 213.0; 238.0	783.8; 179.8; 188.8; 193.7; 221.5	2	1,583.5
3rd place, bronze medalist(s)	5	Norway; Johann André Forfang; Daniel-André Tande; Halvor Egner Granerud; Marius Lindvik	210.5; 201.5; 219.0; 221.5	778.7; 194.5; 174.3; 197.7; 212.2	4	210.5; 192.5; 222.0; 228.0	780.9; 197.7; 167.9; 201.8; 213.5	3	1,559.6
4	7	Austria; Michael Hayböck; Ulrich Wohlgenannt; Manuel Fettner; Stefan Kraft	216.0; 210.0; 2132.0; 224.0	785.9; 200.8; 184.6; 185.9; 214.6	3	213.5; 196.5; 217.0; 220.0	766.8; 198.3; 172.6; 195.5; 200.4	5	1,552.7
5	2	Poland; Piotr Żyła; Dawid Kubacki; Kamil Stoch; Jakub Wolny	210.5; 213.0; 194.0; 215.5	728.0; 190.8; 182.0; 160.4; 194.8	5	201.5; 212.0; 221.5; 231.0	767.8; 190.8; 191.1; 181.1; 211.8	4	1,495.8
6	3	Japan; Yukiya Satō; Naoki Nakamura; Junshirō Kobayashi; Ryōyū Kobayashi	215.5; 186.5; 189.5; 224.5	712.0; 200.8; 151.0; 153.4; 206.8	6	223.5; 193.0; 202.0; 210.0	721.9; 209.7; 166.8; 155.2; 190.2	6	1,433.9
7	1	Finland; Antti Aalto; Eetu Nousiainen; Kalle Heikkinen; Niko Kytösaho	169.0; 222.0; 154.5; 196.5	605.7; 132.2; 193.5; 110.5; 169.5	7	184.0; 184.5; 158.0; 179.5	577.1; 157.7; 156.2; 113.3; 149.9	7	1,182.8
