= Yevhen Marusiak =

Ukrainian ski jumper (born 2000)

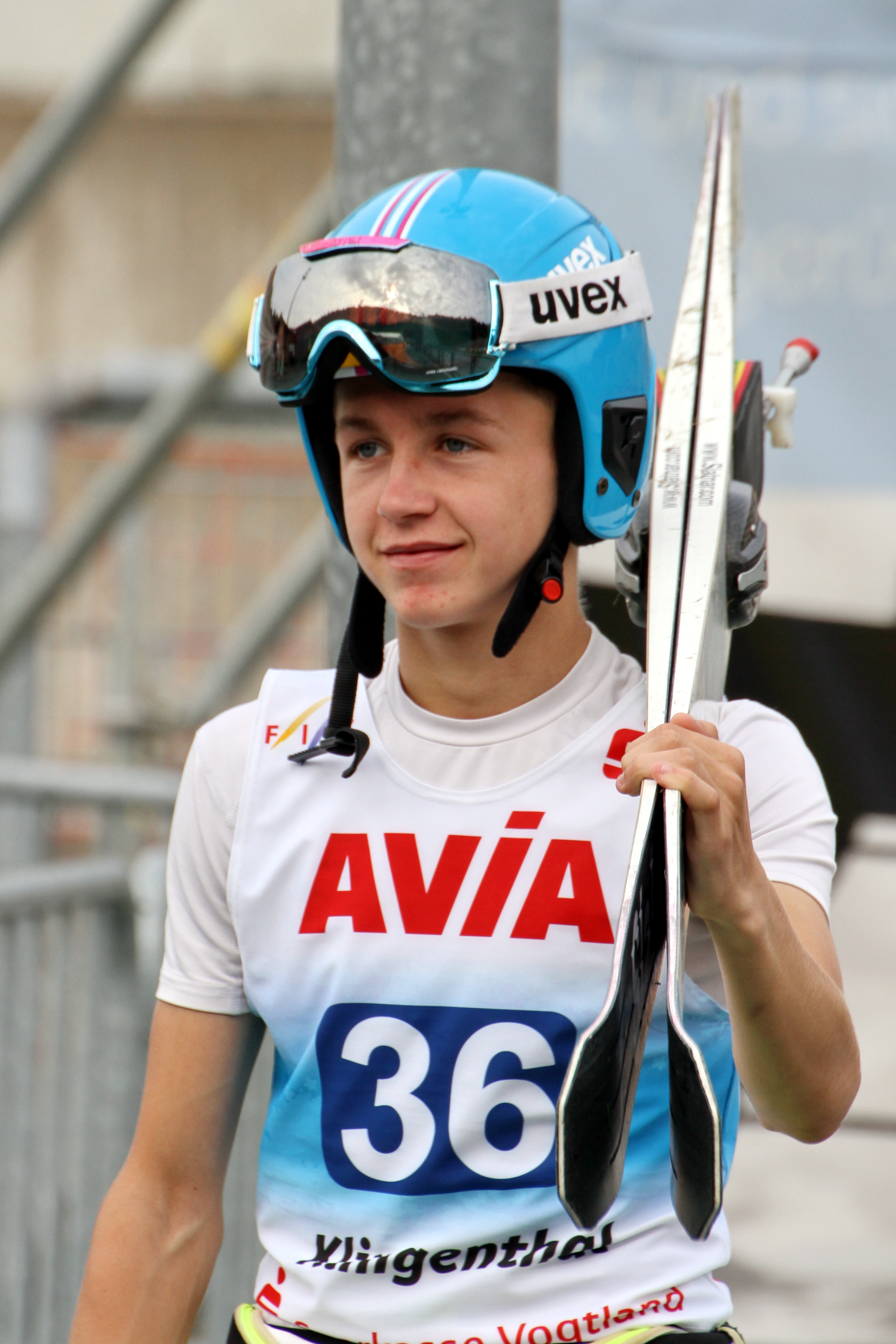
- Marusiak in 2017

Personal information
- Full name: Yevhen Ihorovych Marusiak
- Nationality: Ukraine
- Born: 16 March 2000 (age 26) Kryvorivnia, Ukraine

Sport
- Sport: Skiing
- Club: ShVSM Ivano-Frankivsk

World Cup career
- Seasons: 2019–present
- Indiv. starts: 42
- Team starts: 5

Achievements and titles
- Personal bests: 228.5 m (750 ft); Planica, 21 March 2024
- Updated on 16 February 2025

Yevhen Marusiak (Ukrainian: Євген Ігорович Марусяк; born 16 March 2000) is a Ukrainian ski jumper.

He holds the national record for the longest jump, which was established on 1sh April 2023 in Planica, Slovenia, on Letalnica bratov Gorišek flying hill where he scored 213.5 m (700 ft) in team event.

On 27 January 2023, he became the first Ukrainian in history to surpass two-hundred meters (201.5 m).

On 12 February 2023, he became the first Ukrainian in history who won the Continental Cup competition.

== Career ==
Marusiak started his international career by representing Ukraine at the 2017 European Youth Olympic Winter Festival in Erzurum, Turkey. There he finished 21st in the HS109 competition.

He also participated at three Junior World Championships between 2016 and 2019. His best personal finish was 49th in an HS100 competition in Râșnov in 2016.

Marusiak debuted at the World Championships in 2019.

Marusiak debuted at the Ski Jumping World Cup on February 13, 2021, in Polish Zakopane, where he was 49th on large hill. As of January 2022, his best World Cup results were 46th, both on February 14, 2021, in Polish Zakopane and on February 19, 2021, in Romanian Râșnov. As of January 2022, his best individual Continental Cup result was 38th on March 14, 2021, in Polish Zakopane.

In 2022, Marusiak was nominated for his first Winter Games in Beijing.

In 2023, at the ski flying event in Tauplitz, he got his first World Cup points in his career with 26th place.

== Results ==
=== Olympic Games ===
Year	Place	Individual		Team	
Year	Place	Normal	Large	Men	Mixed
2022	(China) Beijing	47	50	—	—
2026	(Italy) Milan and Cortina d'Ampezzo	42	41	14	—

=== Nordic World Championships ===
Year	Place	Individual		Team	
Year	Place	Normal	Large	Men	Mixed
2019	(Austria) Seefeld	57	58	—	—
2021	(Germany) Oberstdorf	56	39	13	—
2023	(Slovenia) Planica	17	27	—	15

=== Ski Flying World Championships ===
Year	Place	Individual	Team
2020	(Slovenia) Planica	44	—

== World Cup ==
=== Standings ===
Season	Overall	4H	SF	RA	W6	T5	P7
2019/20	—	—	—	—	—	—	N/A
2020/21	—	—	—	N/A	—	N/A	—
2021/22	—	—	—	—	N/A	N/A	—
2022/23	54	—	30	—	N/A	N/A	41
2023/24	45	58	23	33	N/A	N/A	30
2024/25	37	48	21		N/A	N/A	

=== Individual starts (42) ===
winner (1); second (2); third (3); did not compete (–); failed to qualify (q); disqualified (DQ)
Season	1	2	3	4	5	6	7	8	9	10	11	12	13	14	15	16	17	18	19	20	21	22	23	24	25	26	27	28	29	30	31	32	Points
2019/20	Wisła	Kuusamo	Nizhny Tagil	Nizhny Tagil	Klingenthal	Engelberg	Engelberg	Oberstdorf	Garmisch-Partenkirchen	Innsbruck	Bischofshofen	Val di Fiemme	Val di Fiemme	Titisee-Neustadt	Titisee-Neustadt	Zakopane	Sapporo	Sapporo	Willingen	Tauplitz	Tauplitz	Râșnov	Râșnov	Lahti	Lahti	Lillehammer	Lillehammer						0
2019/20	q	–	–	–	q	–	–	q	q	q	q	q	q	–	–	q	–	–	–	–	–	q	q	–	–	–	–						0
2020/21	Wisła	Ruka	Ruka	Nizhny Tagil	Nizhny Tagil	Engelberg	Engelberg	Oberstdorf	Garmisch-Partenkirchen	Innsbruck	Bischofshofen	Titisee-Neustadt	Titisee-Neustadt	Zakopane	Lahti	Willingen	Willingen	Klingenthal	Klingenthal	Szczyrk	Szczyrk	Râșnov	Planica	Planica	Planica								0
2020/21	q	–	–	–	–	–	–	–	–	–	–	–	–	–	–	–	–	–	–	49	46	46	–	–	–								0
2021/22	Nizhny Tagil	Nizhny Tagil	Ruka	Ruka	Wisła	Klingenthal	Klingenthal	Engelberg	Engelberg	Oberstdorf	Garmisch-Partenkirchen	Bischofshofen	Bischofshofen	Bischofshofen	Zakopane	Titisee-Neustadt	Titisee-Neustadt	Willingen	Willingen	Lahti	Lahti	Lillehammer	Oslo	Oslo	Oberstdorf	Oberstdorf	Planica	Planica					0
2021/22	–	–	–	–	–	–	–	–	q	–	q	–	–	–	q	q	q	–	–	–	–	–	–	–	–	–	–	–					0
2022/23	Wisła	Wisła	Kuusamo	Kuusamo	Titisee-Neustadt	Titisee-Neustadt	Engelberg	Engelberg	Oberstdorf	Garmisch-Partenkirchen	Innsbruck	Bischofshofen	Zakopane	Sapporo	Sapporo	Sapporo	Tauplitz	Tauplitz	Willingen	Willingen	Lake Placid	Lake Placid	Râșnov	Oslo	Oslo	Lillehammer	Lillehammer	Vikersund	Vikersund	Lahti	Planica	Planica	21
2022/23	q	q	–	–	q	q	–	–	–	q	q	–	–	–	–	–	q	26	46	50	–	–	28	–	–	–	–	–	–	–	18	–	21
2023–24	Ruka	Ruka	Lillehammer	Lillehammer	Klingenthal	Klingenthal	Engelberg	Engelberg	Oberstdorf	Garmisch-Partenkirchen	Innsbruck	Bischofshofen	Wisła	Zakopane	Willingen	Willingen	Lake Placid, New York	Lake Placid, New York	Sapporo	Sapporo	Oberstdorf	Oberstdorf	Lahti	Lahti	Oslo	Oslo	Trondheim	Trondheim	Vikersund	Vikersund	Planica	Planica	57
2023–24	–	–	48	35	44	32	–	–	q	q	35	49	DQ	44	36	37	–	–	–	–	29	22	–	–	37	43	32	25	11	–	15	–	57
2024–25	Lillehammer	Lillehammer	Kuusamo	Kuusamo	Wisła	Wisła	Titisee-Neustadt	Titisee-Neustadt	Engelberg	Engelberg	Oberstdorf	Garmisch-Partenkirchen	Innsbruck	Bischofshofen	Zakopane	Oberstdorf	Oberstdorf	Willingen	Willingen	Lake Placid	Lake Placid	Sapporo	Sapporo	Oslo	Vikersund	Vikersund	Lahti	Planica	Planica				71
2024–25	40	36	–	–	42	34	26	12	30	q	33	41	q	q	47	16	22	41	25	18	33	–	–										71
