= Anton Korchuk =

Ukrainian ski jumper

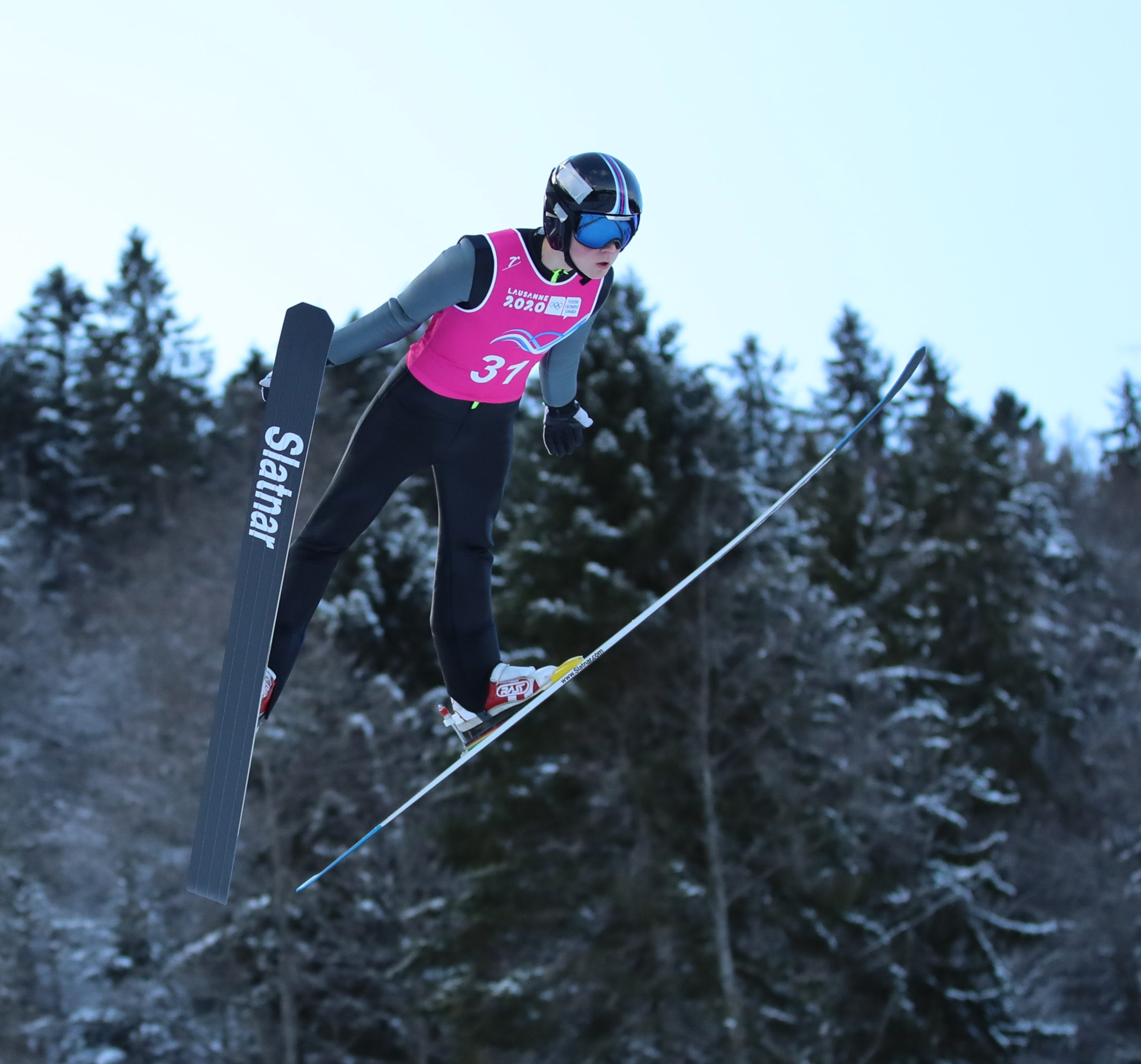
- Korchuk in 2020

Personal information
- Full name: Anton Vasyliovych Korchuk
- Born: 4 August 2004 (age 21)

Sport
- Sport: Skiing
- Updated on January 28, 2022

Anton Korchuk (Ukrainian: Антон Васильович Корчук; born August 4, 2004) is a Ukrainian ski jumper.

== Career ==
Korchuk started his international career by representing Ukraine at the 2020 Winter Youth Olympics in Swiss Lausanne. There he finished 28th in the normal hill competition. He also participated at two Junior World Championships between 2020 and 2021. As of January 2022, his best personal finish was 40th in an HS100 competition in Lahti in 2021.

Korchuk debuted at the World Championships in 2021.

Korchuk has yet to debut in the main round competitions at the Ski Jumping World Cup. As of January 2022, his best individual Continental Cup result was 28th on December 4, 2021, in Chinese Zhangjiakou.

In 2022, Korchuk was nominated for his first Winter Games in Beijing. He was not able to qualify for the finals of the large hill or normal hill competition as he only finished 52nd and 56th respectively.

== Results ==
=== Olympic Games ===
Year	Event	NH	LH	Team	Mixed team
2022	Beijing, China	52	56		

=== World Championships ===
Year	Event	NH	LH	Team	Mixed team
2021	Oberstdorf, Germany	65	DSQ	13	
