= Vitaliy Kalinichenko =

Ukrainian ski jumper (born 1993)

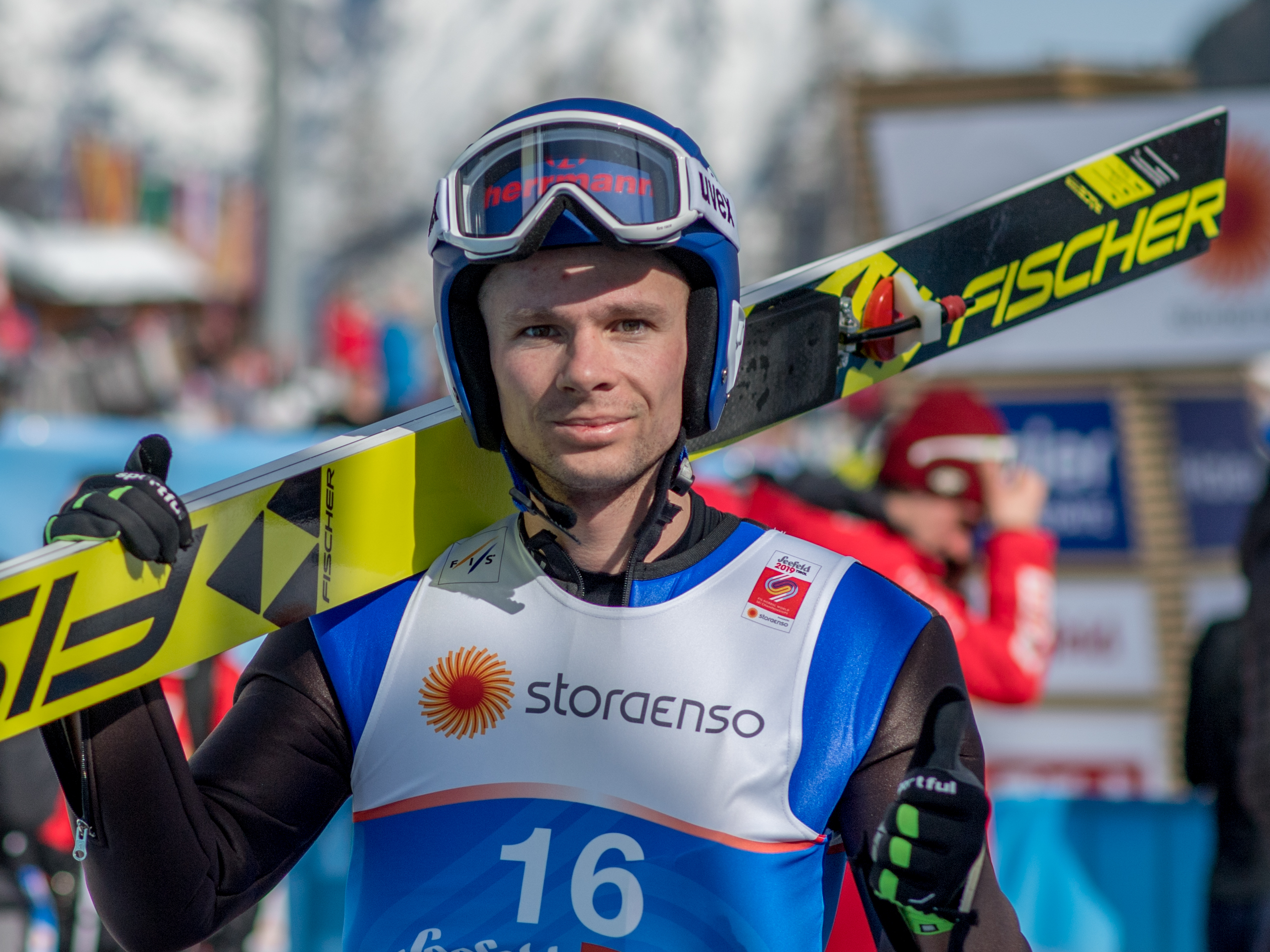
- Kalinichenko in 2019

Personal information
- Full name: Vitaliy Kalinichenko
- Born: 9 August 1993 (age 32) Vorokhta, Ukraine

Sport
- Sport: Skiing
- Updated on January 28, 2022

Vitaliy Kalinichenko (Ukrainian: Віталій Калініченко; born August 9, 1993, in Vorokhta, Ukraine) is a Ukrainian ski jumper and former Nordic combined skier.

== Career ==
Kalinichenko started his sporting career in both Nordic combined and ski jumping but before 2014, he mostly competed as a Nordic combined skier. He participated at four Junior World Championships between 2010 and 2013. His best personal finish was 17th in an HN/5 km competition in Liberec in 2013.

Kalinichenko debuted at the World Cup on February 2, 2013, in Russian Sochi, where he was 43rd. His best individual finish was 38th on February 10, 2013, in Almaty, Kazakhstan. His best (and only) team finish was 20th in the team sprint on January 12, 2014, in French Chaux-Neuve (together with Balanda). During his Nordic combined career, he completed five individual and 1 team World Cup races.

His last start in Nordic combined was at the Continental Cup stage in Eisenerz, Austria, when he finished 50th. His best individual Continental Cup result was 22nd on January 13, 2013, in Chaykovsky, Russia.

Since 2014, he switched to ski jumping only. He took part in the 2015 Winter Universiade in Štrbské Pleso, Slovakia, where he was 35th in the HS100 competition.

As a ski jumper, Kalinichenko participated at four World Championships. His first noticeable result came during the 2021 World Championships when he finished 29th in the large hill competition.

Kalinichenko debuted at the Ski Jumping World Cup on February 21, 2020, in Romanian Râșnov, where he was 48th on the normal hill. As of January 2022, his best World Cup result was 37th, both on February 19, 2021, in Romanian Râșnov and on December 18, 2021, in Swiss Engelberg. As of January 2022, his best individual Continental Cup result was 10th on January 16, 2021, in Austrian Innsbruck.

In 2022, Kalinichenko was nominated for his first Winter Games in Beijing.

== Results ==
=== Ski jumping ===
==== Olympic Games ====
Year	Event	NH	LH	Team	Mixed team
2022	Beijing, China	—N/a	44	—N/a	—N/a
2026	Milan and Cortina d'Ampezzo, Italy	47	44	14	—N/a

==== World Championships ====
Year	Event	NH	LH	Team	Mixed team
2015	Falun, Sweden	60	56		
2017	Lahti, Finland	DSQ	57		
2019	Seefeld, Austria	63	42		
2021	Oberstdorf, Germany	44	29	13	

==== Ski Flying World Championships ====
Year	Event	Individual	Team
2020	Planica, Slovenia	38	

=== Nordic combined ===
==== World Championships ====
Year	Event	NH	LH	Team	Team sprint
2013	Val di Fiemme, Italy	51	47		14
