= Karl Geiger =

German ski jumper (born 1993)

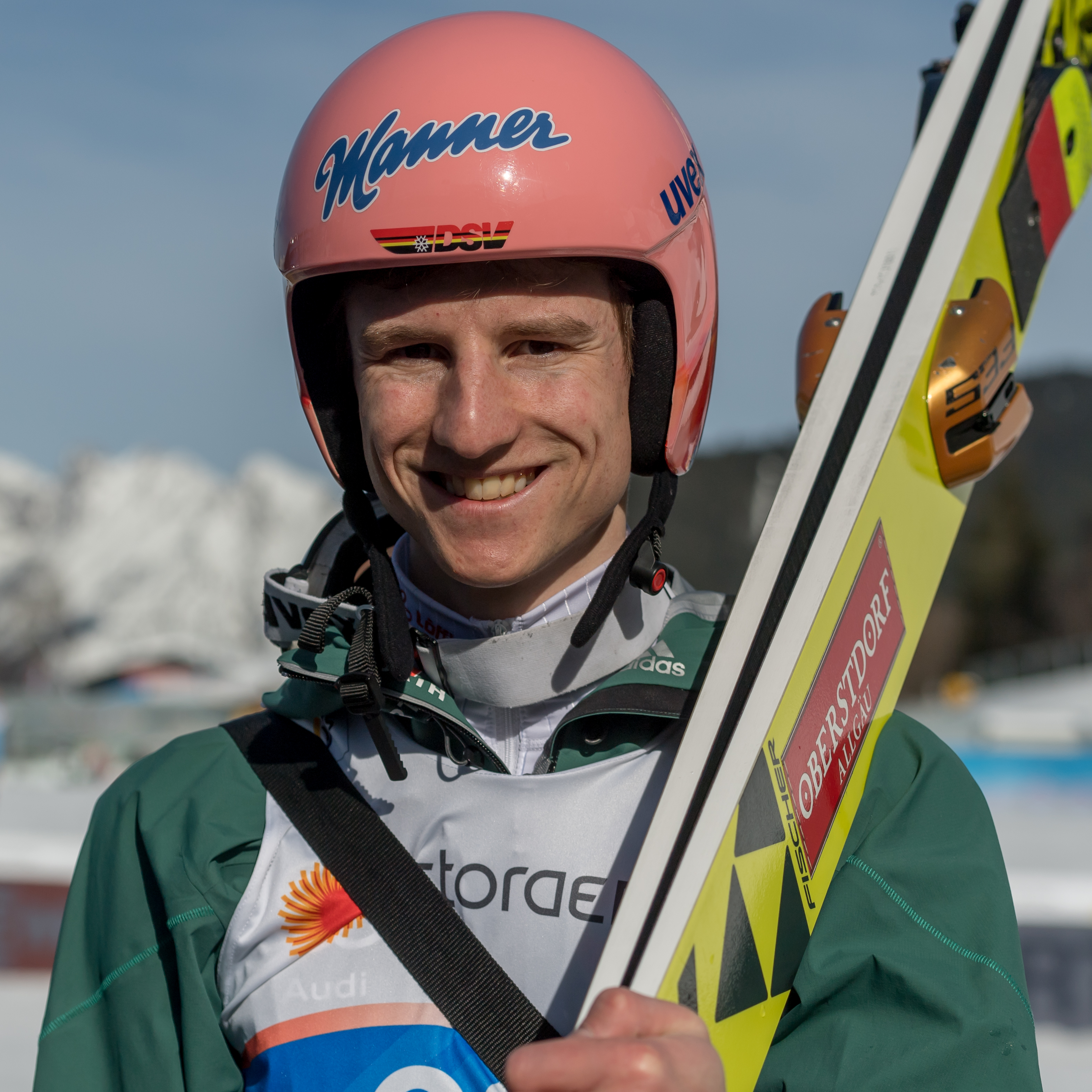
- Geiger in Seefeld, 2019

Personal information
- Nationality: Germany
- Born: 11 February 1993 (age 33) Oberstdorf, Germany
- Height: 1.85 m (6 ft 1 in)

Sport
- Sport: Skiing
- Club: SC 1906 Oberstdorf

World Cup career
- Seasons: 2012–present
- Indiv. starts: 267
- Indiv. podiums: 40
- Indiv. wins: 15
- Team starts: 42
- Team podiums: 24
- Team wins: 6
- Ski Flying titles: 1 (2021)

Achievements and titles
- Personal bests: 243.5 m (799 ft); Planica, 25 March 2017
Medal record
Representing Germany
Men's ski jumping
Olympic Games
Silver medal – second place	2018 Pyeongchang	Team LH
Bronze medal – third place	2022 Beijing	Individual LH
Bronze medal – third place	2022 Beijing	Team LH
World Championships
Gold medal – first place	2019 Seefeld	Team LH
Gold medal – first place	2019 Seefeld	Mixed team NH
Gold medal – first place	2021 Oberstdorf	Team LH
Gold medal – first place	2021 Oberstdorf	Mixed team NH
Gold medal – first place	2023 Planica	Mixed team NH
Silver medal – second place	2019 Seefeld	Individual LH
Silver medal – second place	2021 Oberstdorf	Individual NH
Bronze medal – third place	2021 Oberstdorf	Individual LH
Bronze medal – third place	2023 Planica	Individual NH
Men's ski flying
World Championships
Gold medal – first place	2020 Planica	Individual
Silver medal – second place	2020 Planica	Team
Silver medal – second place	2022 Vikersund	Team
Bronze medal – third place	2024 Bad Mitterndorf	Team
- Updated on 1 December 2024

Karl Geiger (born 11 February 1993) is a German ski jumper who has competed at World Cup level since 2012. He won gold medals in both the team and mixed team competitions at the 2021 Nordic World Ski Championships and an individual gold medal at the 2021 Ski Flying World Championships. Geiger represented Germany at the 2018 and 2022 Winter Olympics. In the World Cup, he finished runner-up in the 2019–2020 and 2021–2022 seasons.

== Career ==
His career-best achievements include winning a team silver medal at the 2018 Winter Olympics as well as individual silver, team, and mixed team gold at the FIS Nordic World Ski Championships 2019.

On 12 December 2020, Geiger achieved the gold medal of the 2020 Ski Flying World Championships. He became the ski flying World Champion beating Halvor Egner Granerud and Markus Eisenbichler.

Geiger's debut in FIS Ski Jumping World Cup took place in November 2012 in Lillehammer. On 15 December 2018 in Engelberg, Geiger won a World Cup competition for the first time in his career. On 16 February 2019, he achieved his second World Cup victory in Willingen, Germany.

== Record ==
=== Olympic Games ===
Event	Normal hill	Large hill	Team LH	Team Mixed
(South Korea) 2018 Pyeongchang	10	7	2nd place, silver medalist(s)	–
(China) 2022 Beijing	15	3rd place, bronze medalist(s)	3rd place, bronze medalist(s)	9

=== FIS World Nordic Ski Championships ===
Event	Normal hill	Large hill	Team LH	Mixed Team
(Austria) 2019 Seefeld	18	2nd place, silver medalist(s)	1st place, gold medalist(s)	1st place, gold medalist(s)
(Germany) 2021 Oberstdorf	2nd place, silver medalist(s)	3rd place, bronze medalist(s)	1st place, gold medalist(s)	1st place, gold medalist(s)
(Slovenia) 2023 Planica	3rd place, bronze medalist(s)	8	5	1st place, gold medalist(s)
(Norway) 2025 Trondheim	4	23	4	

=== FIS Ski Flying World Championships ===
Event	Individual	Team
(Slovenia) 2020 Planica	1st place, gold medalist(s)	2nd place, silver medalist(s)
(Norway) 2022 Vikersund	8	2nd place, silver medalist(s)
(Austria) 2024 Bad Mitterndorf	19	3rd place, bronze medalist(s)
(Germany) 2026 Oberstdorf	17	4

== World Cup ==
=== Season standings ===
Season				Tour Standings			
Season	Overall	4H	SF	RA	W6	T5	P7
2012/13	41	59	47	N/A			
2013/14	42	48	—	N/A			
2014/15	75	58	—	N/A			
2015/16	30	31	29	N/A			
2016/17	18	18	18	23	N/A		
2017/18	14	11	24	20	20	N/A	35
2018/19	10	11	13	11	3rd place, bronze medalist(s)	N/A	6
2019/20	2nd place, silver medalist(s)	3rd place, bronze medalist(s)	5	12	4	5	N/A
2020/21	6	2nd place, silver medalist(s)	1st place, gold medalist(s)	N/A	20	N/A	1st place, gold medalist(s)
2021/22	2nd place, silver medalist(s)	4	10	2nd place, silver medalist(s)	N/A		11
2022/23	11	23	25	14	N/A		20
2023/24	17	14	31	36	N/A		17
2024/25	9				N/A		

=== Individual wins ===
No.	Season	Date	Location	Hill	Size
1	2018/19	15 December 2018	(Switzerland) Engelberg	Gross-Titlis-Schanze HS140	LH
2	2018/19	16 February 2019	(Germany) Willingen	Mühlenkopfschanze HS145	LH
3	2019/20	11 January 2020	(Italy) Val di Fiemme	Trampolino Giuseppe Dal Ben HS104	NH
4	2019/20	12 January 2020	(Italy) Val di Fiemme	Trampolino Giuseppe Dal Ben HS104	NH
5	2019/20	21 February 2020	(Romania) Râșnov	Râșnov Ski Jump HS97	NH
6	2019/20	1 March 2020	(Finland) Lahti	Salpausselkä HS130	LH
7	2020/21	29 December 2020	(Germany) Oberstdorf	Schattenbergschanze HS137	LH
8	2020/21	26 March 2021	(Slovenia) Planica	Letalnica bratov Gorišek HS240	FH
9	2020/21	28 March 2021	(Slovenia) Planica	Letalnica bratov Gorišek HS240	FH
10	2021/22	20 November 2021	(Russia) Nizhny Tagil	Tramplin Stork HS134	LH
11	2021/22	18 December 2021	(Switzerland) Engelberg	Gross-Titlis-Schanze HS140	LH
12	2021/22	22 January 2022	(Germany) Titisee-Neustadt	Hochfirstschanze HS142	LH
13	2021/22	23 January 2022	(Germany) Titisee-Neustadt	Hochfirstschanze HS142	LH
14	2023/24	9 December 2023	(Germany) Klingenthal	Vogtland Arena HS140	LH
15	2023/24	10 December 2023	(Germany) Klingenthal	Vogtland Arena HS140	LH

=== Individual starts ===
Season	1	2	3	4	5	6	7	8	9	10	11	12	13	14	15	16	17	18	19	20	21	22	23	24	25	26	27	28	29	30	31	32	Points
2012/13	Lillehammer	Lillehammer	Kuusamo	Krasnaja Polana	Krasnaja Polana	Engelberg	Engelberg	Oberstdorf	Garmisch-Partenkirchen	Innsbruck	Bischofshofen	Wisła	Zakopane	Sapporo	Sapporo	Vikersund	Vikersund	Harrachov	Harrachov	Klingenthal	Oberstdorf	Lahti	Kuopio	Trondheim	Oslo	Planica	Planica						86
2012/13	21	30	26	29	6	29	35	q	36	–	–	33	q	–	–	–	–	–	–	42	20	40	21	46	26	34	–						86
2013/14	Klingenthal	Kuusamo	Lillehammer	Lillehammer	Titisee-Neustadt	Titisee-Neustadt	Engelberg	Engelberg	Oberstdorf	Garmisch-Partenkirchen	Innsbruck	Bischofshofen	Tauplitz	Tauplitz	Wisła	Zakopane	Sapporo	Sapporo	Willingen	Willingen	Falun	Lahti	Lahti	Kuopio	Trondheim	Oslo	Planica	Planica					106
2013/14	25	14	15	46	29	23	28	32	q	47	32	34	–	–	–	–	13	12	–	–	20	q	31	36	–	–	–	–					106
2014/15	Klingenthal	Kuusamo	Kuusamo	Lillehammer	Lillehammer	Nizhny Tagil	Nizhny Tagil	Engelberg	Engelberg	Oberstdorf	Garmisch-Partenkirchen	Innsbruck	Bischofshofen	Tauplitz	Wisła	Zakopane	Sapporo	Sapporo	Willingen	Willingen	Titisee-Neustadt	Titisee-Neustadt	Vikersund	Vikersund	Lahti	Kuopio	Trondheim	Oslo	Oslo	Planica	Planica		5
2014/15	–	–	–	q	q	45	31	–	–	38	q	–	–	–	–	–	26	39	–	–	–	–	–	–	–	–	–	–	–	–	–		5
2015/16	Klingenthal	Lillehammer	Lillehammer	Nizhny Tagil	Nizhny Tagil	Engelberg	Engelberg	Oberstdorf	Garmisch-Partenkirchen	Innsbruck	Bischofshofen	Willingen	Zakopane	Sapporo	Sapporo	Trondheim	Vikersund	Vikersund	Vikersund	Lahti	Lahti	Kuopio	Almaty	Almaty	Wisła	Titisee-Neustadt	Planica	Planica	Planica				174
2015/16	–	–	–	–	–	–	–	26	32	31	40	36	–	–	–	16	40	28	28	18	2	25	17	20	24	–	21	33	24				174
2016/17	Kuusamo	Kuusamo	Klingenthal	Lillehammer	Lillehammer	Engelberg	Engelberg	Oberstdorf	Garmisch-Partenkirchen	Innsbruck	Bischofshofen	Wisła	Wisła	Zakopane	Willingen	Oberstdorf	Oberstdorf	Sapporo	Sapporo	Pyeongchang	Pyeongchang	Oslo	Trondheim	Vikersund	Planica	Planica							369
2016/17	6	9	14	12	14	24	47	27	28	15	9	29	10	11	36	32	23	13	16	9	25	25	31	11	16	23							369
2017/18	Wisła	Kuusamo	Nizhny Tagil	Nizhny Tagil	Titisee-Neustadt	Engelberg	Engelberg	Oberstdorf	Garmisch-Partenkirchen	Innsbruck	Bischofshofen	Tauplitz	Zakopane	Willingen	Willingen	Lahti	Oslo	Lillehammer	Trondheim	Vikersund	Planica	Planica											427
2017/18	17	18	6	9	14	11	12	17	7	12	16	q	21	14	22	9	14	11	7	34	q	7											427
2018/19	Wisła	Kuusamo	Kuusamo	Nizhny Tagil	Nizhny Tagil	Engelberg	Engelberg	Oberstdorf	Garmisch-Partenkirchen	Innsbruck	Bischofshofen	Val di Fiemme	Val di Fiemme	Zakopane	Sapporo	Sapporo	Oberstdorf	Oberstdorf	Oberstdorf	Lahti	Willingen	Willingen	Oslo	Lillehammer	Trondheim	Vikersund	Planica	Planica					765
2018/19	9	5	8	10	5	1	4	12	19	24	10	19	19	24	42	35	16	18	30	6	1	6	17	20	8	22	9	7					765
2019/20	Wisła	Kuusamo	Nizhny Tagil	Nizhny Tagil	Klingenthal	Engelberg	Engelberg	Oberstdorf	Garmisch-Partenkirchen	Innsbruck	Bischofshofen	Val di Fiemme	Val di Fiemme	Titisee-Neustadt	Titisee-Neustadt	Zakopane	Sapporo	Sapporo	Willingen	Tauplitz	Tauplitz	Râșnov	Râșnov	Lahti	Lahti	Lillehammer	Lillehammer						1519
2019/20	7	7	2	6	5	3	4	2	2	8	2	1	1	12	5	5	11	5	5	4	6	1	2	2	1	19	19						1519
2020/21	Wisła	Ruka	Ruka	Nizhny Tagil	Nizhny Tagil	Engelberg	Engelberg	Oberstdorf	Garmisch-Partenkirchen	Innsbruck	Bischofshofen	Titisee-Neustadt	Titisee-Neustadt	Zakopane	Lahti	Willingen	Willingen	Klingenthal	Klingenthal	Zakopane	Zakopane	Râșnov	Planica	Planica	Planica								826
2020/21	2	9	8	–	–	–	–	1	5	16	3	25	11	25	3	11	23	32	38	23	22	3	3	1	1								826
2021/22	Nizhny Tagil	Nizhny Tagil	Ruka	Ruka	Wisla	Klingenthal	Klingenthal	Engelberg	Engelberg	Oberstdorf	Garmisch-Partenkirchen	Innsbruck	Bischofshofen	Bischofshofen	Zakopane	Titisee-Neustadt	Titisee-Neustadt	Willingen	Willingen	Lahti	Lahti	Lillhammer	Oslo	Oslo	Oberstdorf	Oberstdorf	Planica	Planica					1515
2021/22	1	2	5	2	4	4	22	1	2	5	7	4	3	8	2	1	1	19	2	5	5	3	7	5	9	9	12	16					1515
2022/23	Wisła	Wisła	Ruka	Ruka	Titisee-Neustadt	Titisee-Neustadt	Engelberg	Engelberg	Oberstdorf	Garmisch-Partenkirchen	Innsbruck	Bischofshofen	Zakopane	Sapporo	Sapporo	Sapporo	Bad Mitterndorf	Bad Mitterndorf	Willingen	Willingen	Lake Placid, New York	Lake Placid, New York	Râșnov	Oslo	Oslo	Lillehammer	Lillehammer	Vikersund	Vikersund	Lahti	Planica	Planica	736
2022/23	34	17	6	33	3	5	22	10	4	11	q	23	14	20	22	34	–	–	5	21	8	4	3	3	12	5	37	21	17	3	25	23	736
2023/24	Ruka	Ruka	Lillehammer	Lillehammer	Klingenthal	Klingenthal	Engelberg	Engelberg	Oberstdorf	Garmisch-Partenkirchen	Innsbruck	Bischofshofen	Wisła	Zakopane	Willingen	Willingen	Lake Placid, New York	Lake Placid, New York	Sapporo	Sapporo	Oberstdorf	Oberstdorf	Lahti	Oslo	Oslo	Trondheim	Trondheim	Vikersund	Vikersund	Planica	Planica		623
2023/24	11	9	4	4	1	1	20	4	7	16	26	15	10	23	33	31	12	37	22	12	29	27	39	36	35	36	16	39	–	13	22		623
2024/25	Lillehammer	Lillehammer	Ruka	Ruka	Wisła	Wisła	Titisee-Neustadt	Titisee-Neustadt	Engelberg	Engelberg	Oberstdorf	Garmisch-Partenkirchen	Innsbruck	Bischofshofen	Zakopane	Zakopane	Oberstdorf	Oberstdorf	Willingen	Willingen	Lake Placid, New York	Lake Placid, New York	Sapporo	Sapporo	Oslo	Oslo	Vikersund	Vikersund	Lahti	Planica	Planica		99
2024/25	17	13	26	3																													99

=== Podiums ===
Season	Podiums			
Season	Medals			Total
Season	1st place, gold medalist(s)	2nd place, silver medalist(s)	3rd place, bronze medalist(s)	
2012/13	-	-	-	-
2013/14	-	-	-	-
2014/15	-	-	-	-
2015/16	-	1	-	1
2016/17	-	-	-	-
2017/18	-	-	-	-
2018/19	2	-	-	2
2019/20	4	6	1	11
2020/21	3	1	4	8
2021/22	4	5	2	11
2022/23	-	-	4	4
2023/24	2	–	–	2
2024/25	–	–	1	1
Total	15	13	12	40

== Personal life ==
Geiger studied energy and environmental engineering at Kempten University of Applied Sciences, graduating in December 2019. His hobbies include paragliding, hiking, mountain biking, and playing the accordion. He married his girlfriend Franziska in September 2020. In December 2020, they welcomed their first daughter. In August 2025, they welcomed their second daughter. Nordic combined skier Vinzenz Geiger is his second cousin.
