= Vojtěch Štursa =

Czech ski jumper

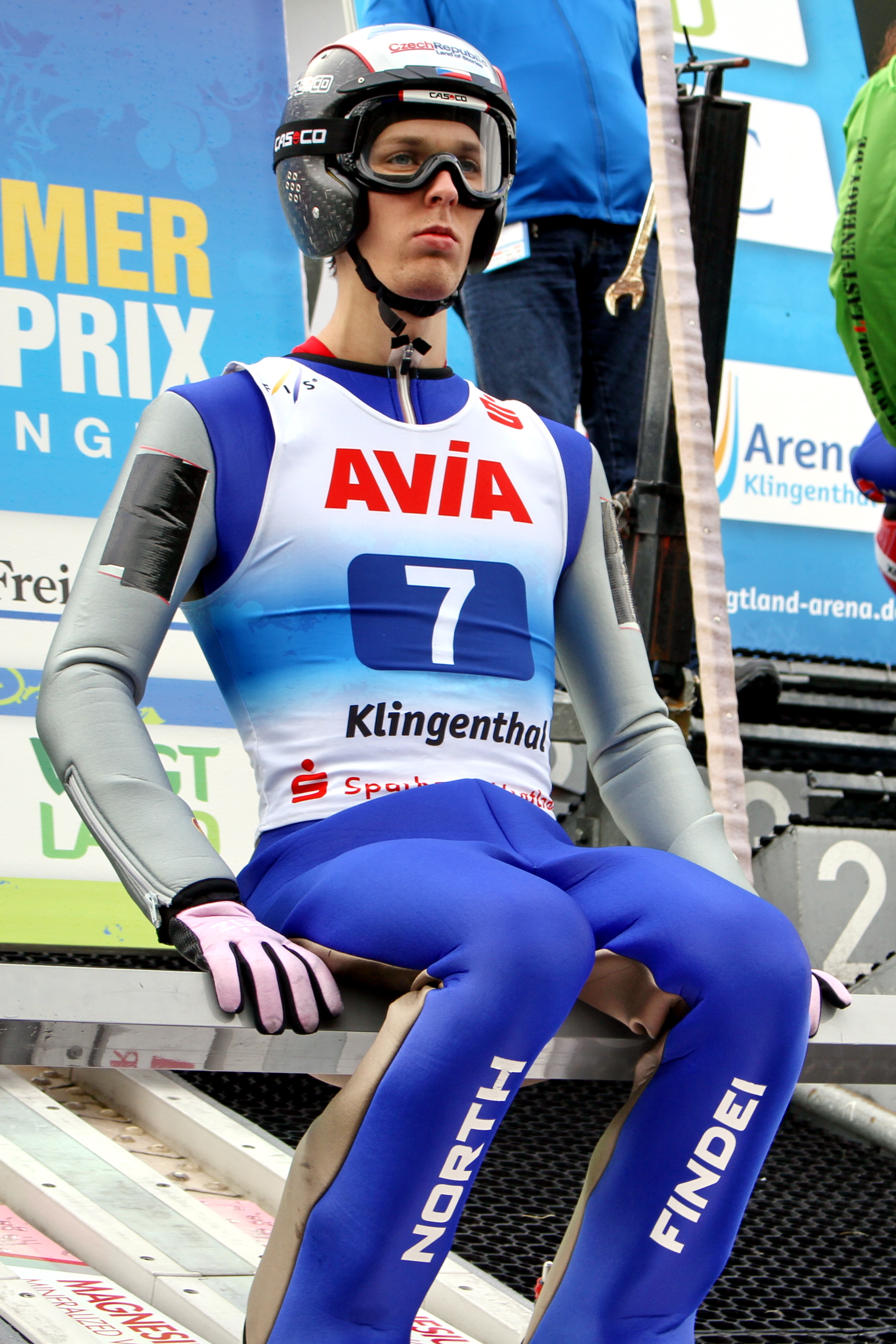
- Vojtěch Štursa in 2017

Personal information
- Nationality: Czech
- Born: 3 August 1995 (age 29)

Sport
- Sport: Ski jumping

Vojtěch Štursa (born 3 August 1995) is a Czech ski jumper. He competed in two events at the 2018 Winter Olympics.
