= Danil Sadreev =

Russian ski jumper (born 2003)

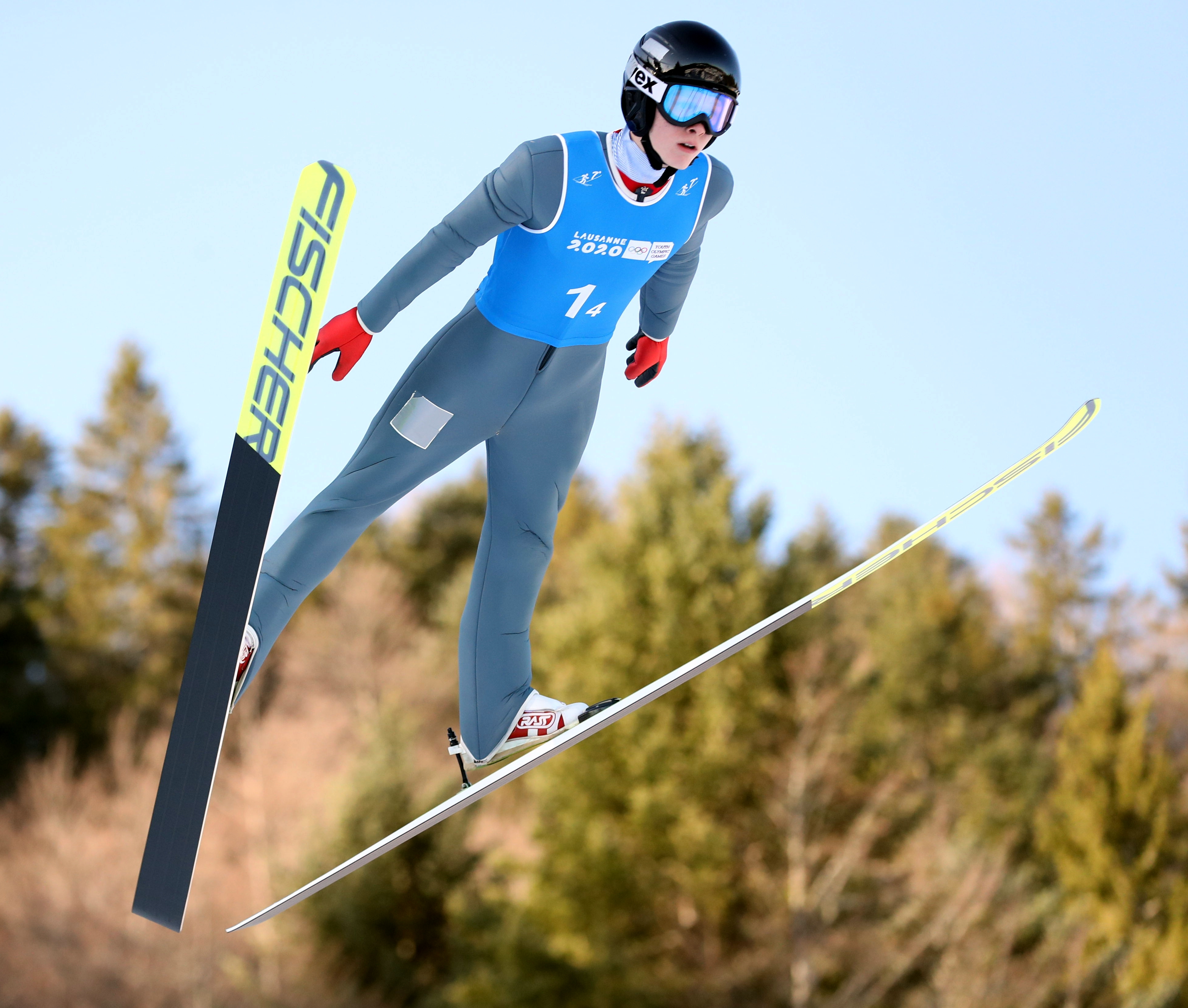
- Sadreev in 2020

Personal information
- Full name: Danil Marselevich Sadreev
- Nationality: Russian
- Born: 7 May 2003 (age 23) Leninogorsk, Russia

Sport
- Sport: Ski jumping
- Club: MBU DOD SDUSSH Leninogorsk
Medal record
Representing ROC
Olympic Games
Silver medal – second place	2022 Beijing	Mixed team
Representing Russia
Junior World Championships
Bronze medal – third place	2021 Lahti	Team NH

Danil Marselevich Sadreev (Russian: Данил Марселевич Садреев; born 7 May 2003) is a Russian ski jumper. He competed in the 2022 Winter Olympics.

Sadreev finished just off the podium in fourth at the 2020 Winter Youth Olympic Games, just 1.1 points shy of the bronze medal. He also competed in the cross-country skiing/ski jumping/Nordic combined team event, finishing ninth.
