= Dominik Peter =

Swiss freestyle skier (born 2001)

Personal information
- Nationality: Swiss
- Born: 30 May 2001 (age 24); Zürich, Switzerland

Sport
- Sport: Ski jumping
- Club: Am Bachtelwald

Dominik Peter (born 30 May 2001) is a Swiss Ski jumper. He competed in the 2022 Winter Olympics. He currently resides in Einsiedeln
