= Anže Lanišek =

Slovenian ski jumper (born 1996)

- Lanišek in 2025

Personal information
- Born: 20 April 1996 (age 30) Ljubljana, Slovenia
- Height: 1.75 m (5 ft 9 in)

Sport
- Sport: Ski jumping
- Club: SSK Mengeš

World Cup career
- Seasons: 2014–present
- Indiv. starts: 258
- Indiv. podiums: 43
- Indiv. wins: 11
- Team starts: 37
- Team podiums: 17
- Team wins: 5

Achievements and titles
- Personal bests: 247.5 m (812 ft); Planica, 30 March 2025
Medal record
Representing Slovenia
Men's ski jumping
Olympic Games
Gold medal – first place	2026 Milano Cortina	Mixed team NH
World Championships
Gold medal – first place	2023 Planica	Team LH
Gold medal – first place	2025 Trondheim	Team LH
Silver medal – second place	2025 Trondheim	Mixed team LH
Bronze medal – third place	2021 Oberstdorf	Individual NH
Bronze medal – third place	2023 Planica	Mixed team NH
European Games
Bronze medal – third place	2023 Kraków-Małopolska	Mixed team NH
Men's ski flying
Ski Flying World Championships
Gold medal – first place	2022 Vikersund	Team
- Updated on 22 November 2026

Anže Lanišek (born 20 April 1996) is a Slovenian ski jumper. At the 2026 Winter Olympics, he won a gold medal in the mixed team event.

== Career ==
Lanišek made his World Cup debut in Planica on 21 March 2014, where he finished in 34th place. He achieved his first World Cup victory on 28 November 2021 in Kuusamo, Finland.

Lanišek won gold with the Slovenia national team in the team event at the FIS Ski Flying World Championships 2022 in Vikersund. He also won bronze in the individual normal hill event at the FIS Nordic World Ski Championships 2021 in Oberstdorf.

== Major tournament results ==
=== Winter Olympics ===
Year	Individual		Team		
Year	Normal	Large	Men	Super	Mixed
(China) 2022 Beijing	13	—	—	N/A	—
(Italy) 2026 Milano Cortina	26	30	N/A	5	1st place, gold medalist(s)

=== FIS Nordic World Ski Championships ===
Year	Individual		Team	
Year	Normal	Large	Men	Mixed
(Finland) 2017 Lahti	—	36	5	4
(Austria) 2019 Seefeld	—	35	6	—
(Germany) 2021 Oberstdorf	3rd place, bronze medalist(s)	5	5	4
(Slovenia) 2023 Planica	9	11	1st place, gold medalist(s)	3rd place, bronze medalist(s)
(Norway) 2025 Trondheim	8	4	1st place, gold medalist(s)	2nd place, silver medalist(s)

=== FIS Ski Flying World Championships ===
Year	Individual	Team
(Austria) 2016 Bad Mitterndorf	12	4
(Slovenia) 2020 Planica	12	4
(Norway) 2022 Vikersund	5	1st place, gold medalist(s)
(Germany) 2026 Oberstdorf	8	6

== World Cup results ==
=== Standings ===
Season	Overall	4H	SF	RA
2013–14	—	—	—	N/A
2014–15	62	65	—	N/A
2015–16	25	22	37	N/A
2016–17	33	—	31	30
2017–18	—	—	—	45
2018–19	30	41	37	41
2019–20	15	21	27	21
2020–21	9	23	21	N/A
2021–22	7	16	5	11
2022–23	3rd place, bronze medalist(s)	3rd place, bronze medalist(s)	3rd place, bronze medalist(s)	3rd place, bronze medalist(s)
2023–24	14	5	29	11
2024–25	4	10	2nd place, silver medalist(s)	4
2025–26	5	9	14	N/A

=== Individual wins ===
No.	Season	Date	Location	Hill	Size
1	2021–22	28 November 2021	(Finland) Ruka	Rukatunturi HS142	LH
2	2022–23	26 November 2022	(Finland) Ruka	Rukatunturi HS142	LH
3	2022–23	9 December 2022	(Germany) Titisee-Neustadt	Hochfirstschanze HS142	LH
4	2022–23	17 December 2022	(Switzerland) Engelberg	Gross-Titlis-Schanze HS140	LH
5	2022–23	11 March 2023	(Norway) Oslo	Holmenkollbakken HS134	LH
6	2023–24	1 January 2024	(Germany) Garmisch-Partenkirchen	Große Olympiaschanze HS142	LH
7	2024–25	22 March 2025	(Finland) Lahti	Salpausselkä HS130	LH
8	2024–25	30 March 2025	(Slovenia) Planica	Letalnica bratov Gorišek HS240	FH
9	2025–26	26 November 2025	(Sweden) Falun	Lugnet HS132	LH
10	2025–26	29 November 2025	(Finland) Ruka	Rukatunturi HS142	LH
11	2025–26	11 January 2026	(Poland) Zakopane	Wielka Krokiew HS140	LH

=== Individual starts ===
winner (1); second (2); third (3); did not compete (–); failed to qualify (q); disqualified (DQ)
Season	1	2	3	4	5	6	7	8	9	10	11	12	13	14	15	16	17	18	19	20	21	22	23	24	25	26	27	28	29	30	31	32	Points
2013–14	Klingenthal	Ruka	Lillehammer	Lillehammer	Titisee-Neustadt	Titisee-Neustadt	Engelberg	Engelberg	Oberstdorf	Garmisch-Partenkirchen	Innsbruck	Bischofshofen	Tauplitz	Tauplitz	Wisła	Zakopane	Sapporo	Sapporo	Willingen	Willingen	Falun	Lahti	Lahti	Kuopio	Trondheim	Oslo	Planica	Planica					0
2013–14	–	–	–	–	–	–	–	–	–	–	–	–	–	–	–	–	–	–	–	–	–	–	–	–	–	–	34	40					0
2014–15	Klingenthal	Ruka	Ruka	Lillehammer	Lillehammer	Nizhny Tagil	Nizhny Tagil	Engelberg	Engelberg	Oberstdorf	Garmisch-Partenkirchen	Innsbruck	Bischofshofen	Tauplitz	Wisła	Zakopane	Sapporo	Sapporo	Willingen	Willingen	Titisee-Neustadt	Titisee-Neustadt	Vikersund	Vikersund	Lahti	Kuopio	Trondheim	Oslo	Oslo	Planica	Planica		23
2014–15	21	25	30	–	–	39	27	q	29	49	q	–	–	–	–	–	–	–	–	–	–	–	–	–	–	–	–	–	–	33	–		23
2015–16	Klingenthal	Lillehammer	Lillehammer	Nizhny Tagil	Nizhny Tagil	Engelberg	Engelberg	Oberstdorf	Garmisch-Partenkirchen	Innsbruck	Bischofshofen	Willingen	Zakopane	Sapporo	Sapporo	Trondheim	Vikersund	Vikersund	Vikersund	Lahti	Lahti	Kuopio	Almaty	Almaty	Wisła	Titisee-Neustadt	Planica	Planica	Planica				232
2015–16	35	19	31	7	4	24	40	16	23	44	20	42	24	6	15	19	52	21	33	25	34	–	–	–	40	–	35	35	29				232
2016–17	Ruka	Ruka	Klingenthal	Lillehammer	Lillehammer	Engelberg	Engelberg	Oberstdorf	Garmisch-Partenkirchen	Innsbruck	Bischofshofen	Wisła	Wisła	Zakopane	Willingen	Oberstdorf	Oberstdorf	Sapporo	Sapporo	Pyeongchang	Pyeongchang	Oslo	Trondheim	Vikersund	Planica	Planica							98
2016–17	42	q	48	47	37	q	q	–	–	–	–	–	–	–	34	21	32	24	34	4	14	q	32	24	q	25							98
2017–18	Wisła	Ruka	Nizhny Tagil	Nizhny Tagil	Titisee-Neustadt	Engelberg	Engelberg	Oberstdorf	Garmisch-Partenkirchen	Innsbruck	Bischofshofen	Tauplitz	Zakopane	Willingen	Willingen	Lahti	Oslo	Lillehammer	Trondheim	Vikersund	Planica	Planica											0
2017–18	q	36	32	q	q	–	–	–	–	–	–	–	–	–	–	40	39	q	34	35	38	–											0
2018–19	Wisła	Ruka	Ruka	Nizhny Tagil	Nizhny Tagil	Engelberg	Engelberg	Oberstdorf	Garmisch-Partenkirchen	Innsbruck	Bischofshofen	Val di Fiemme	Val di Fiemme	Zakopane	Sapporo	Sapporo	Oberstdorf	Oberstdorf	Oberstdorf	Lahti	Willingen	Willingen	Oslo	Lillehammer	Trondheim	Vikersund	Planica	Planica					177
2018–19	20	10	21	25	q	36	34	–	–	12	39	18	17	13	16	11	24	34	36	24	–	–	37	44	37	q	q	29					177
2019–20	Wisła	Ruka	Nizhny Tagil	Nizhny Tagil	Klingenthal	Engelberg	Engelberg	Oberstdorf	Garmisch-Partenkirchen	Innsbruck	Bischofshofen	Val di Fiemme	Val di Fiemme	Titisee-Neustadt	Titisee-Neustadt	Zakopane	Sapporo	Sapporo	Willingen	Tauplitz	Tauplitz	Râșnov	Râșnov	Lahti	Lahti	Oslo	Lillehammer						543
2019–20	2	3	14	28	13	24	14	17	21	11	31	10	9	14	6	29	17	10	19	17	31	–	–	4	10	11	23						543
2020–21	Wisła	Ruka	Ruka	Nizhny Tagil	Nizhny Tagil	Engelberg	Engelberg	Oberstdorf	Garmisch-Partenkirchen	Innsbruck	Bischofshofen	Titisee-Neustadt	Titisee-Neustadt	Zakopane	Lahti	Willingen	Willingen	Klingenthal	Klingenthal	Zakopane	Zakopane	Râșnov	Planica	Planica	Planica								775
2020–21	6	39	10	9	17	3	4	9	12	2	q	12	15	2	7	10	16	5	9	4	2	–	28	26	14								775
2021–22	Nizhny Tagil	Nizhny Tagil	Ruka	Ruka	Wisła	Klingenthal	Klingenthal	Engelberg	Engelberg	Oberstdorf	Garmisch-Partenkirchen	Bischofshofen	Bischofshofen	Bischofshofen	Zakopane	Titisee-Neustadt	Titisee-Neustadt	Willingen	Willingen	Lahti	Lahti	Lillehammer	Oslo	Oslo	Oberstdorf	Oberstdorf	Planica	Planica					936
2021–22	7	7	2	1	13	20	23	8	7	23	14	37	15	13	3	2	2	34	15	–	–	13	23	2	4	15	3	5					936
2022–23	Wisła	Wisła	Ruka	Ruka	Titisee-Neustadt	Titisee-Neustadt	Engelberg	Engelberg	Oberstdorf	Garmisch-Partenkirchen	Innsbruck	Bischofshofen	Zakopane	Sapporo	Sapporo	Sapporo	Tauplitz	Tauplitz	Willingen	Willingen	Lake Placid	Lake Placid	Râșnov	Oslo	Oslo	Lillehammer	Lillehammer	Vikersund	Vikersund	Lahti	Planica	Planica	1,679
2022–23	25	2	1	4	1	2	1	3	10	2	3	2	4	6	50	9	13	9	2	18	18	–	–	1	2	18	2	5	3	5	2	2	1,679
2023–24	Ruka	Ruka	Lillehammer	Lillehammer	Klingenthal	Klingenthal	Engelberg	Engelberg	Oberstdorf	Garmisch-Partenkirchen	Innsbruck	Bischofshofen	Wisła	Zakopane	Willingen	Willingen	Lake Placid	Lake Placid	Sapporo	Sapporo	Oberstdorf	Oberstdorf	Lahti	Lahti	Oslo	Oslo	Trondheim	Trondheim	Vikersund	Vikersund	Planica	Planica	661
2023–24	15	12	8	14	6	4	5	9	18	1	7	3	9	3	–	–	–	–	–	–	–	–	–	–	11	17	19	9	19	17	37	25	661
2024–25	Lillehammer	Lillehammer	Ruka	Ruka	Wisła	Wisła	Titisee-Neustadt	Titisee-Neustadt	Engelberg	Engelberg	Oberstdorf	Garmisch-Partenkirchen	Innsbruck	Bischofshofen	Zakopane	Oberstdorf	Oberstdorf	Willingen	Willingen	Lake Placid	Lake Placid	Sapporo	Sapporo	Oslo	Vikersund	Vikersund	Lahti	Planica	Planica				1,056
2024–25	6	15	18	17	19	24	10	4	6	23	15	4	10	18	4	8	DQ	2	8	7	3	–	–	4	3	5	1	2	1				1,056
2025–26	Lillehammer	Lillehammer	Falun	Falun	Ruka	Wisła	Wisła	Klingenthal	Klingenthal	Engelberg	Engelberg	Oberstdorf	Garmisch-Partenkirchen	Innsbruck	Bischofshofen	Zakopane	Sapporo	Sapporo	Willingen	Willingen	Bad Mitterndorf	Bad Mitterndorf	Lahti	Lahti	Oslo	Oslo	Vikersund	Planica	Planica				1,009
2025–26	7	6	2	1	1	4	8	16	25	9	14	11	12	7	9	1	–	–	17	7	q	12	15	11	14	2	10	7	13				1,009
