= Viktor Polášek =

Czech ski jumper

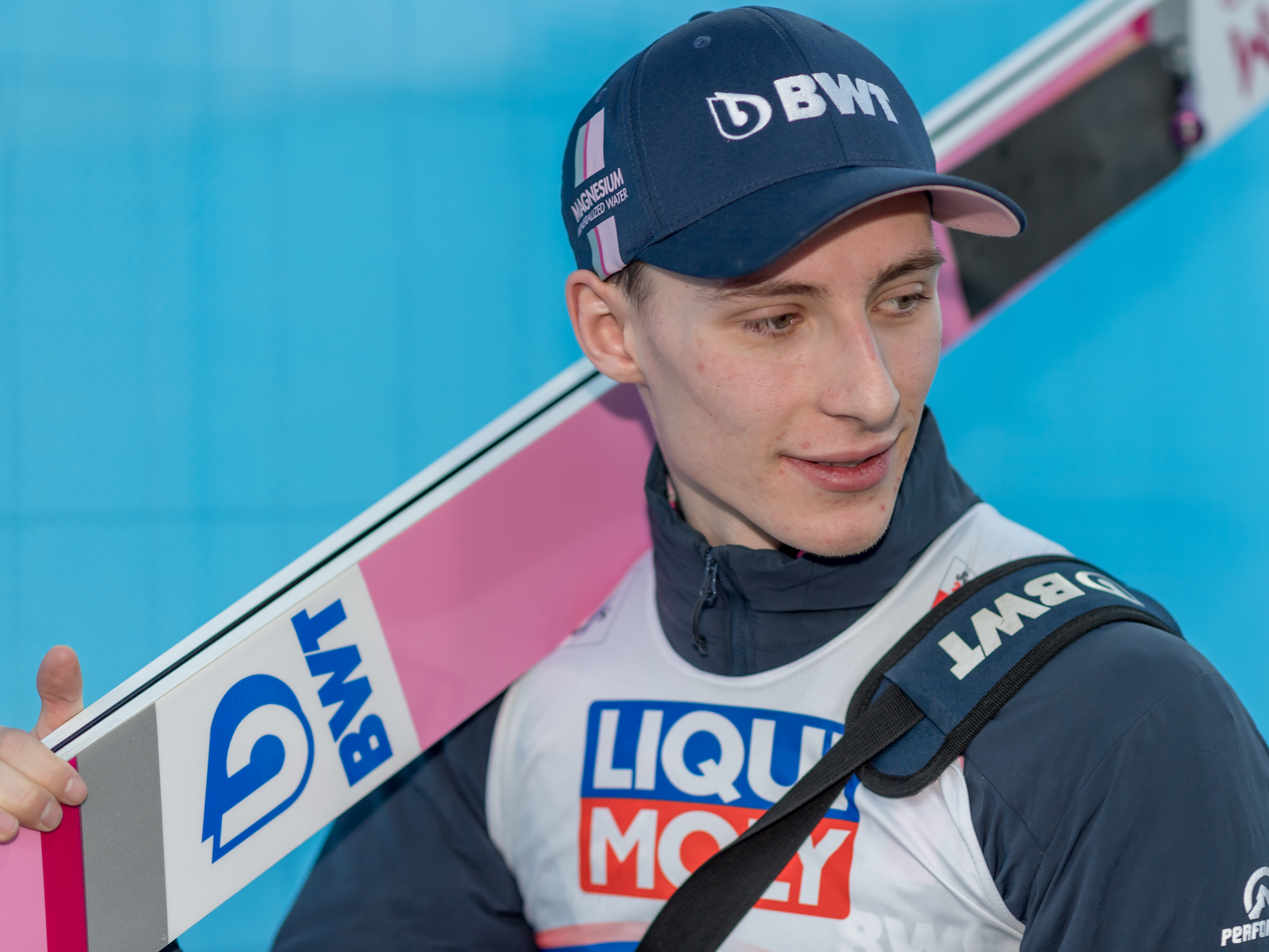
- Polášek at the Seefeld in Tirol in 2019

Personal information
- Nationality: Czech
- Born: 18 July 1997 (age 27); Nové Město na Moravě, Czech Republic

Sport
- Sport: Ski jumping

Viktor Polášek (born 18 July 1997) is a Czech ski jumper. He competed in two events at the 2018 Winter Olympics.
