= Mikhail Nazarov =

Russian ski jumper (born 1994)

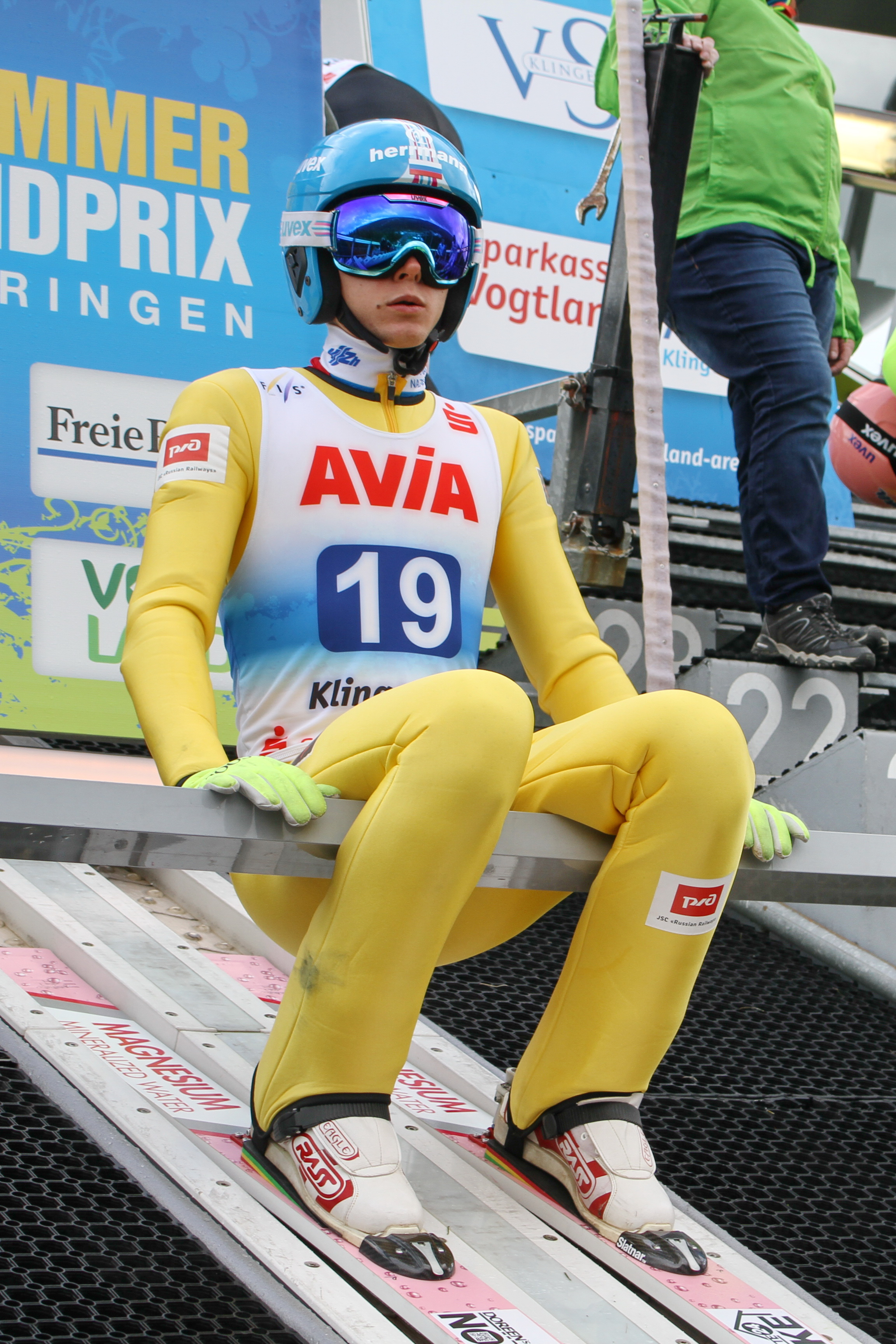
- Mikhail Nazarov in 2017

Personal information
- Full name: Mikhail Andreevich Nazarov
- Nationality: Russian
- Born: 14 October 1994 (age 32) Moscow, Russia

Sport
- Sport: Ski jumping

Mikhail Andreevich Nazarov (Russian: Михаил Андреевич Назаров; born 14 October 1994) is a Russian ski jumper. He competed in two events at the 2018 Winter Olympics.
