= Filip Sakala =

Czech ski jumper

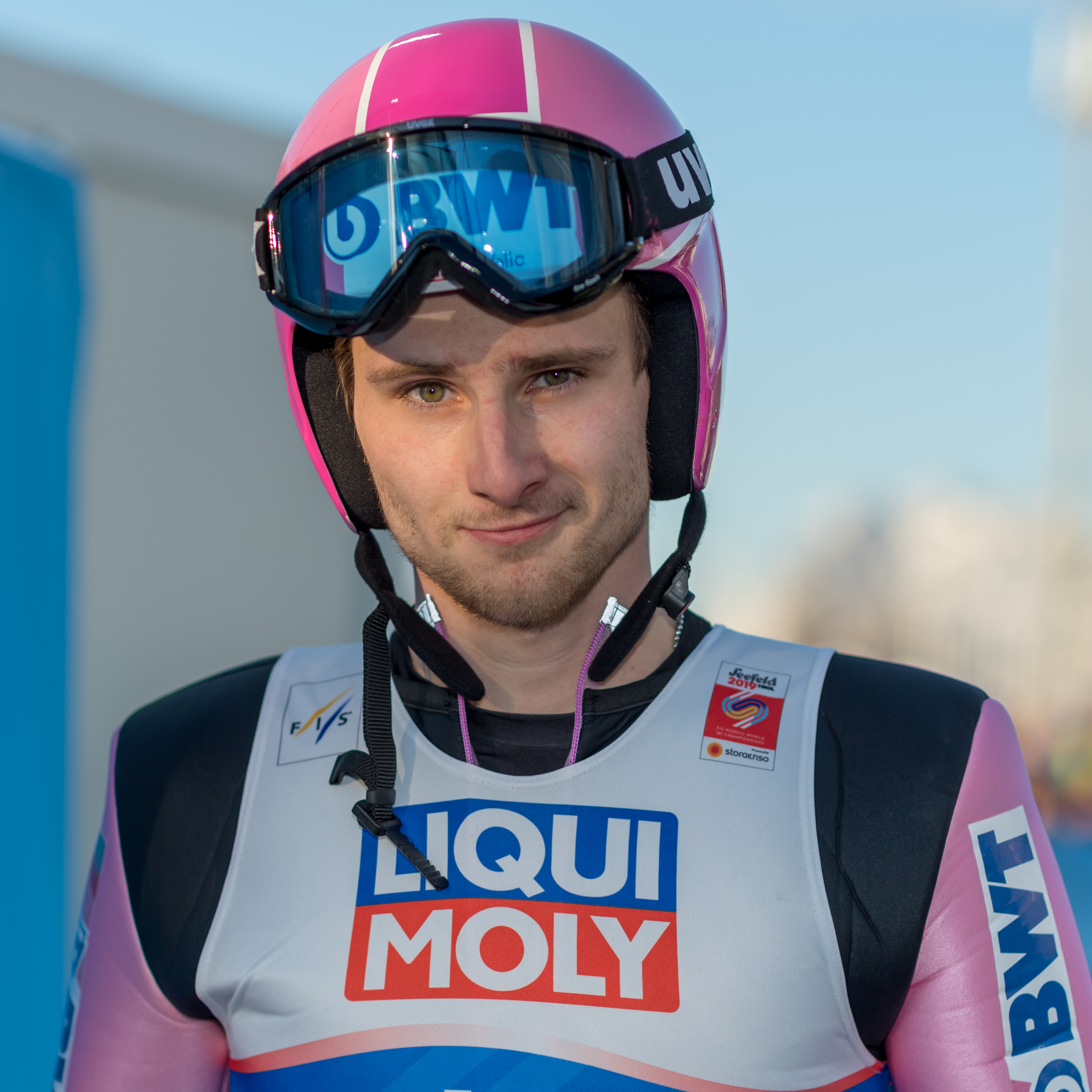
- Sakala at the 2019 World Championships in Seefeld

Personal information
- Nationality: Czech
- Born: 21 May 1996 (age 30) Čeladná, Czech Republic
- Height: 190 cm (6 ft 3 in)

Sport
- Sport: Ski jumping
- Club: TJ Dukla Frenstat pod Radhostem

Filip Sakala (born 21 May 1996) is a Czech ski jumper. He competed in the 2022 Winter Olympics, World Championship in Seefeld 2019, World Championship in Oberstdorf 2021 and Ski Flying World Championship in Planica 2020. His best results include 29th place on the normal hill at the World Championships in Seefeld and 6th place in a World Cup team event in Zakopane. Filip Sakala also won a gold medal at the Czech championship in Liberec on large hill. In total he won four medals at the Czech National Championships. Two silver, one bronze and one gold. After retiring from professional sport, he worked as the Sport Director of Czech Ski Jumping for three years and now focuses on sport psychology education and performance coaching together with fellow Olympian David Bakeš. He is the son of 1992 Winter Olympic Team Large Hill bronze medalist ski jumper Jaroslav Sakala.
