= Eetu Nousiainen =

Finnish ski jumper (born 1997)

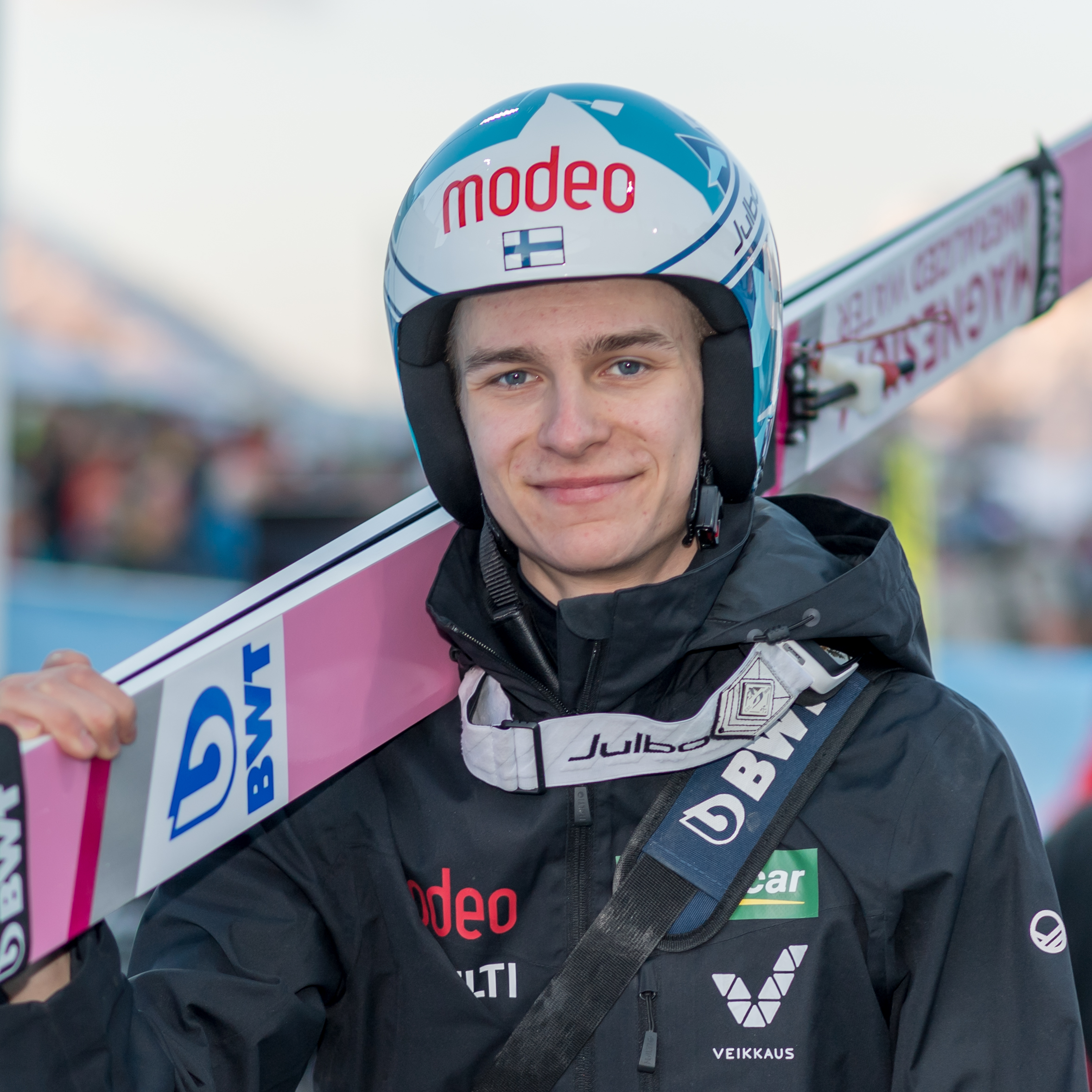
- Eetu Nousiainen in 2019

Personal information
- Nationality: Finnish
- Born: 29 April 1997 (age 27)

Sport
- Sport: Ski jumping

Eetu Nousiainen (born 29 April 1997) is a Finnish ski jumper. He competed in two events at the 2018 Winter Olympics.
