= Čestmír Kožíšek =

Czech ski jumper

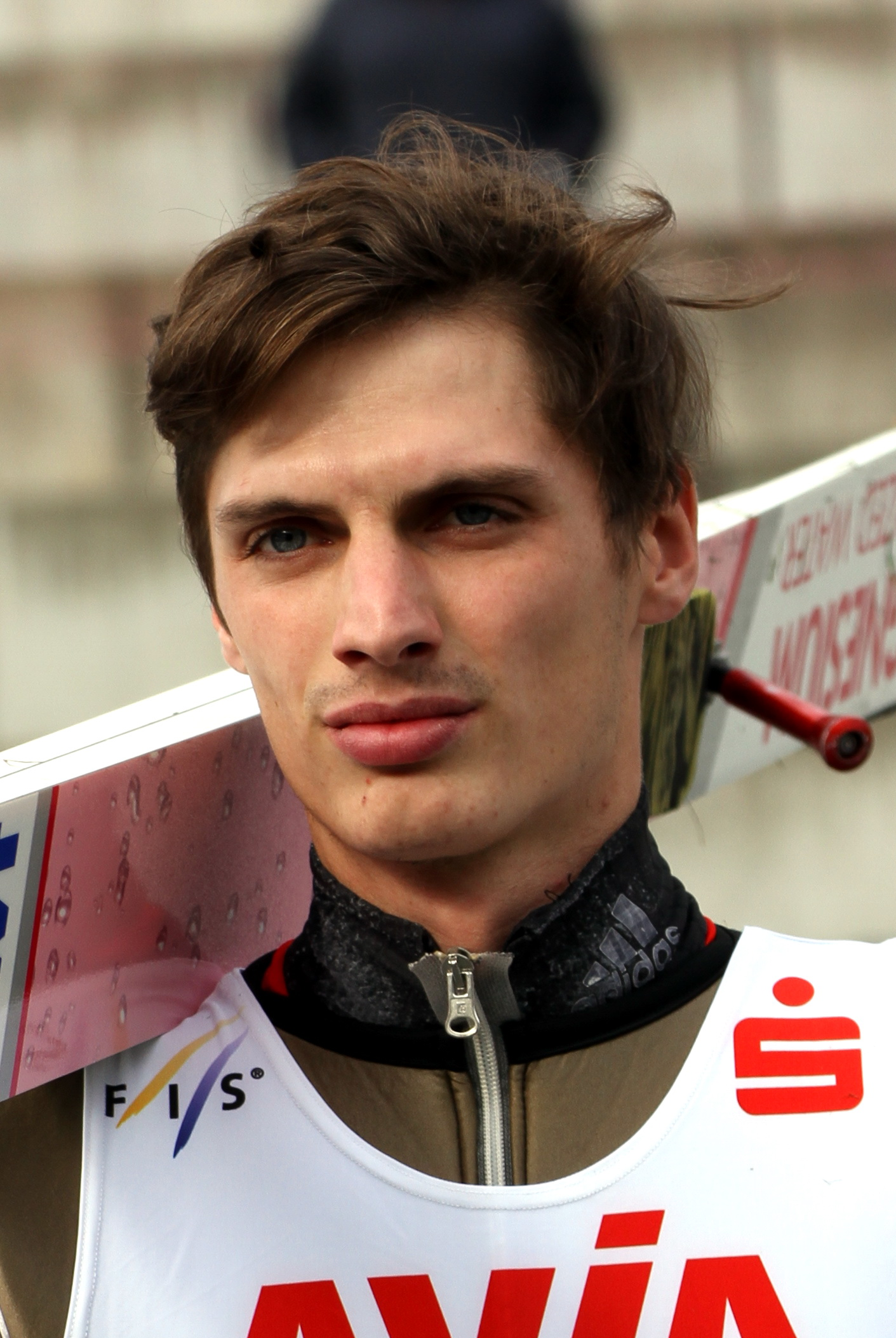
- Kožíšek in 2017

Personal information
- Born: 9 November 1991 (age 34) Jilemnice, Czechoslovakia
- Height: 186 cm (6 ft 1 in)

Sport
- Sport: Skiing
- Club: LSK Lomnice nad Popelkou

World Cup career
- Seasons: 2009-

Achievements and titles
- Personal best: 197.5 m (648 ft) - Harrachov 2013
- Updated on February 2009

Čestmír Kožíšek (born 9 November 1991) is a Czech ski jumper from club LSK Lomnice nad Popelkou.

== Career ==
Kožíšek appeared for the first time in Ski jumping Fis Cup in 2006. He came in 29th place in his first competition. Almost two years later, Kožíšek took his first podium in Fis-Cup, a third place Harrachov. In the Ski jumping Continental Cup, he has been in the top-ten four times, a 5th place as the best result. Kožíšek competed in the Ski jumping World Cup (the highest level in ski jumping) for the first time in Vancouver in 2009. He reached 43rd place as the best result there. Kožíšek came at the 5th place in FIS Junior Ski Jumping World Championships 2009. In Oberstdorf 2009 he took a new personal best and jumped 190,5 metres in the Qualification round and took a surprising 11th place.
