= 2020–21 Four Hills Tournament =

Ski jumping competition

Four Hills Tournament at the 2020–21 FIS Ski Jumping World Cup
- Venue: Schattenbergschanze, Große Olympiaschanze, Bergiselschanze, Paul-Ausserleitner-Schanze
- Location: Austria, Germany
- Dates: 29 December 2020 – 6 January 2021

Medalists
gold medal	(Poland) Kamil Stoch
silver medal	(Germany) Karl Geiger
bronze medal	(Poland) Dawid Kubacki

The 2020–21 Four Hills Tournament took place at the four traditional venues of Oberstdorf, Garmisch-Partenkirchen, Innsbruck, and Bischofshofen, located in Germany and Austria, between 29 December 2020 and 6 January 2021.

== Results ==
=== Oberstdorf ===
HS 137 Schattenbergschanze, Germany
29 December 2020

Rank	Name	Nationality	Jump 1 (m)	Round 1 (pts)	Jump 2 (m)	Round 2 (pts)	Total Points
1	Karl Geiger	Germany	127.0	139.8	136.5	151.3	291.1
2	Kamil Stoch	Poland	125.0	136.0	132.5	152.3	288.3
3	Marius Lindvik	Norway	126.5	138.5	135.5	146.7	285.2
4	Halvor Egner Granerud	Norway	122.0	131.2	131.0	145.9	280.1
5	Markus Eisenbichler	Germany	118.0	121.7	142.0	152.6	274.3
6	Stefan Kraft	Austria	126.5	133.9	125.0	139.7	273.6
7	Andrzej Stękała	Poland	123.0	126.1	136.5	147.2	273.3
8	Philipp Aschenwald	Austria	130.0	138.4	127.0	134.6	273.0
9	Anže Lanišek	Slovenia	120.5	126.1	135.5	144.0	270.1
10	Žiga Jelar	Slovenia	128.0	133.8	124.0	136.0	269.8

=== Garmisch-Partenkirchen ===
HS 142 Große Olympiaschanze, Germany
1 January 2021

Rank	Name	Nationality	Jump 1 (m)	Round 1 (pts)	Jump 2 (m)	Round 2 (pts)	Total Points
1	Dawid Kubacki	Poland	139.0	137.7	144.0	144.4	282.1
2	Halvor Egner Granerud	Norway	137.0	138.7	136.0	136.2	274.9
3	Piotr Żyła	Poland	129.5	124.3	137.0	136.1	260.4
4	Kamil Stoch	Poland	135.0	131.5	132.0	128.5	260.0
5	Karl Geiger	Germany	131.0	119.7	138.0	140.2	259.9
6	Philipp Aschenwald	Austria	130.0	126.7	136.5	131.0	257.7
7	Markus Eisenbichler	Germany	137.5	129.4	134.0	127.8	257.2
7	Ryoyu Kobayashi	Japan	133.5	125.0	132.0	132.2	257.2
9	Johann André Forfang	Norway	128.5	124.2	139.0	132.0	256.2
10	Andrzej Stękała	Poland	133.5	125.3	133.0	128.4	253.7

=== Innsbruck ===
HS 128 Bergiselschanze, Austria
3 January 2021

Rank	Name	Nationality	Jump 1 (m)	Round 1 (pts)	Jump 2 (m)	Round 2 (pts)	Total Points
1	Kamil Stoch	Poland	127.5	131.7	130.0	129.9	261.6
2	Anže Lanišek	Slovenia	127.5	131.0	123.5	118.6	249.6
3	Dawid Kubacki	Poland	126.0	126.0	127.0	122.3	248.3
4	Piotr Żyła	Poland	126.5	125.1	124.5	121.1	246.2
5	Yukiya Satō	Japan	126.5	118.6	130.0	127.0	245.6
6	Markus Eisenbichler	Germany	120.5	119.4	128.5	125.6	245.0
7	Ryoyu Kobayashi	Japan	132.0	128.3	123.0	116.0	244.3
8	Stefan Kraft	Austria	121.0	121.2	127.0	122.3	243.5
9	Michael Hayböck	Austria	127.5	127.6	123.0	114.9	242.5
10	Gregor Deschwanden	Switzerland	124.5	120.3	126.5	120.3	240.6

=== Bischofshofen ===
HS 142 Paul-Ausserleitner-Schanze, Austria
6 January 2021

Rank	Name	Nationality	Jump 1 (m)	Round 1 (pts)	Jump 2 (m)	Round 2 (pts)	Total Points
1	Kamil Stoch	Poland	139.0	150.9	140.0	149.8	300.7
2	Marius Lindvik	Norway	137.0	141.2	140.5	139.2	280.4
3	Karl Geiger	Germany	138.0	143.6	133.5	133.7	277.3
4	Stefan Kraft	Austria	132.0	133.5	137.0	142.4	275.9
5	Robert Johansson	Norway	130.5	131.0	139.0	143.8	274.8
6	Michael Hayböck	Austria	133.5	135.4	137.5	139.2	274.6
7	Piotr Żyła	Poland	134.0	134.3	136.5	139.6	273.9
8	Andrzej Stękała	Poland	135.0	138.4	133.0	133.8	272.2
9	Yukiya Satō	Japan	133.0	135.7	135.0	134.8	270.5
10	Daniel Huber	Austria	134.0	137.5	132.5	131.4	268.9

== Overall standings ==
The final standings after all four events:

Rank	Name	Nationality	Oberstdorf	Garmisch- Partenkirchen	Innsbruck	Bischofshofen	Total Points
1st place, gold medalist(s)	Kamil Stoch	Poland	288.3 (2)	260.0 (4)	261.6 (1)	300.7 (1)	1,110.6
2nd place, silver medalist(s)	Karl Geiger	Germany	291.1 (1)	259.9 (5)	234.2 (16)	277.3 (3)	1,062.5
3rd place, bronze medalist(s)	Dawid Kubacki	Poland	264.3 (15)	282.1 (1)	248.3 (3)	263.1 (15)	1,057.8
4	Halvor Egner Granerud	Norway	280.1 (4)	274.9 (2)	234.3 (15)	268.1 (12)	1,057.4
5	Piotr Żyła	Poland	256.7 (21)	260.4 (3)	246.2 (4)	273.9 (7)	1,037.2
6	Ryoyu Kobayashi	Japan	265.2 (14)	257.2 (7)	244.3 (7)	265.8 (14)	1,032.5
6	Andrzej Stękała	Poland	273.3 (7)	253.7 (10)	233.3 (18)	272.2 (8)	1,032.5
8	Stefan Kraft	Austria	273.6 (6)	226.1 (28)	243.5 (8)	275.9 (4)	1,019.1
9	Peter Prevc	Slovenia	261.4 (17)	249.1 (13)	239.4 (11)	268.1 (12)	1,018.0
10	Daniel Huber	Austria	265.4 (13)	246.6 (14)	233.8 (17)	268.9 (10)	1,014.7
