= FIS Ski Flying World Championships 2020 – Team =

Team at the FIS Ski Flying World Championships 2020
- Venue: Planica Nordic Centre
- Location: Planica, Slovenia
- Dates: 13 December
- Competitors: 32 from 8 nations
- Teams: 8
- Winning points: 1,727.7

Medalists
gold medal	Daniel-André Tande; Johann André Forfang; Robert Johansson; Halvor Egner Granerud	Norway
silver medal	Constantin Schmid; Pius Paschke; Markus Eisenbichler; Karl Geiger	Germany
bronze medal	Piotr Żyła; Andrzej Stękała; Kamil Stoch; Dawid Kubacki	Poland

The Team competition at the FIS Ski Flying World Championships 2020 was held on 13 December 2020.

Norway won the competition, winning their third consecutive title, while Germany finished second, and Poland third.

== Results ==
The first round started at 16:00 and the final round at 17:00.

Rank	Bib	Country	Round 1			Final round			Total
Rank	Bib	Country	Distance (m)	Points	Rank	Distance (m)	Points	Rank	Points
1st place, gold medalist(s)	8	Norway; Daniel-André Tande; Johann André Forfang; Robert Johansson; Halvor Egner Granerud	227.5; 217.0; 220.0; 235.0	862.9; 213.7; 198.5; 212.4; 238.3	2	225.5; 202.5; 229.5; 234.5	864.8; 212.2; 181.0; 221.5; 250.1	1	1,727.7
2nd place, silver medalist(s)	7	Germany; Constantin Schmid; Pius Paschke; Markus Eisenbichler; Karl Geiger	220.5; 220.0; 230.0; 238.0	874.0; 205.2; 201.1; 227.3; 240.4	1	207.5; 223.5; 236.5; 224.5	834.5; 184.8; 206.8; 226.6; 216.3	3	1,708.5
3rd place, bronze medalist(s)	6	Poland; Piotr Żyła; Andrzej Stękała; Kamil Stoch; Dawid Kubacki	226.0; 228.0; 205.5; 211.0	817.6; 212.2; 214.0; 194.6; 196.8	3	234.0; 229.0; 224.0; 209.0	847.9; 219.4; 216.2; 216.1; 196.2	2	1,665.5
4	3	Slovenia; Domen Prevc; Peter Prevc; Bor Pavlovčič; Anže Lanišek	211.0; 221.0; 186.5; 231.0	799.2; 189.5; 201.5; 164.7; 223.6	4	226.0; 218.5; 201.0; 231.5	810.7; 208.6; 196.9; 180.1; 225.1	4	1,609.9
5	4	Japan; Keiichi Satō; Naoki Nakamura; Ryoyu Kobayashi; Yukiya Satō	202.0; 200.5; 207.0; 217.5	752.3; 176.3; 172.9; 194.5; 208.6	5	202.0; 182.5; 203.5; 226.0	731.2; 175.2; 149.2; 184.6; 222.2	6	1,483.5
6	5	Austria; Philipp Aschenwald; Gregor Schlierenzauer; Timon-Pascal Kahofer; Michael Hayböck	206.5; 202.5; 129.5; 223.5	665.5; 184.9; 178.9; 87.9; 213.8	7	216.5; 190.0; 197.0; 231.0	756.6; 196.6; 161.9; 169.6; 228.5	5	1,422.1
7	2	Russia; Ilya Mankov; Danil Sadreev; Mikhail Nazarov; Evgeni Klimov	200.0; 203.0; 186.5; 193.0	687.2; 172.5; 177.4; 164.7; 172.6	6	187.0; 192.5; 187.0; 203.5	669.1; 153.1; 163.5; 163.2; 189.3	7	1,356.3
8	1	Finland; Niko Kytösaho; Jarkko Määttä; Eetu Nousiainen; Antti Aalto	192.0; 186.5; 167.5; 183.5	623.6; 162.3; 153.3; 145.4; 162.6	8	205.0; 180.0; 177.0; 194.5	661.2; 177.7; 151.8; 151.2; 180.5	8	1,284.8
