= 2020–21 FIS Ski Jumping World Cup =

Discipline	Men	Women
Overall	(Norway) Halvor Egner Granerud	(Slovenia) Nika Križnar
Nations Cup	Norway	Austria
Ski flying	(Germany) Karl Geiger	—

Stage events
Planica7	(Germany) Karl Geiger	—
Willingen Six	(Norway) Halvor Egner Granerud	—
Four Hills Tournament	(Poland) Kamil Stoch	—
Russia Tour Blue Bird	—	(Austria) Marita Kramer

Competition
Edition	42nd	10th
Locations	16	7
Individual	25	13
Team	4	2
Mixed	1	1
Cancelled	4	11 + 1 Team
Rescheduled	4 + 1 Team	0 + 1 Team

The 2020–21 FIS Ski Jumping World Cup was the 42nd World Cup season in ski jumping for men, the 24th official World Cup season in ski flying, and the 10th World Cup season for women.

The men's season began on 22 November 2020 in Wisła, Poland and ended on 28 March 2021 in Planica, Slovenia. The women's season started on 18 December 2020 in Ramsau and ended on 28 March in Chaykovsky, Russia.

There were a lot of changes in the World Cup calendar this season due to the COVID-19 pandemic. Prior to the start of the season, competitions in Zaō and Sapporo, for both men and women, were called off. The first ever Chinese World Cup venue (Zhangjiakou, which was for men, replaced by Zakopane), as an Olympic test was cancelled at the start of the season. The women's competition in Lillehammer was initially rescheduled at the start of the season from December to February and eventually cancelled. Both Raw Air tournaments in March were also cancelled.

Halvor Egner Granerud won the overall title and the Willingen Six, Kamil Stoch won the Four Hills Tournament for the 3rd time in his career, Karl Geiger won the ski flying title and the Planica7 and the Nations Cup went to Norway.

Nika Križnar won first women's overall for Slovenia, Marita Kramer won the Russia Tour Blue Bird, and the Nations Cup went to Austria.

== Map of World Cup hosts ==
Europe
Germany	Austria	Asia

== Men's Individual ==
Individual events in the World Cup history

Total	FH	LH	NH	Winners
1027	130	738	159	165

after FH event in Planica (28 March 2021)

=== Calendar ===
N – normal hill / L – large hill / F – flying hill
All	No.	Date	Place (Hill)	Size	Winner	Second	Third	Overall leader	R.
1003	1	22 November 2020	(Poland) Wisła (Malinka HS134)	L _{718}	(Germany) Markus Eisenbichler	(Germany) Karl Geiger	(Austria) Daniel Huber	(Germany) Markus Eisenbichler	
1004	2	28 November 2020	(Finland) Ruka (Rukatunturi HS142)	L _{719}	(Germany) Markus Eisenbichler	(Poland) Piotr Żyła	(Poland) Dawid Kubacki	(Germany) Markus Eisenbichler	
1005	3	29 November 2020	(Finland) Ruka (Rukatunturi HS142)	L _{720}	(Norway) Halvor Egner Granerud	(Germany) Markus Eisenbichler	(Poland) Dawid Kubacki	(Germany) Markus Eisenbichler	
1006	4	5 December 2020	(Russia) Nizhny Tagil (Tramplin Stork HS134)	L _{721}	(Norway) Halvor Egner Granerud	(Austria) Daniel Huber	(Norway) Robert Johansson	(Norway) Halvor Egner Granerud	
1007	5	6 December 2020	(Russia) Nizhny Tagil (Tramplin Stork HS134)	L _{722}	(Norway) Halvor Egner Granerud	(Norway) Robert Johansson	(Norway) Marius Lindvik	(Norway) Halvor Egner Granerud	
FIS Ski Flying World Championships 2020 (11 – 12 December • (Slovenia) Planica) originally scheduled for March 2020, but then cancelled due to COVID-19
1008	6	19 December 2020	(Switzerland) Engelberg (Gross-Titlis-Schanze HS140)	L _{723}	(Norway) Halvor Egner Granerud	(Poland) Kamil Stoch	(Slovenia) Anže Lanišek	(Norway) Halvor Egner Granerud	
1009	7	20 December 2020	(Switzerland) Engelberg (Gross-Titlis-Schanze HS140)	L _{724}	(Norway) Halvor Egner Granerud	(Germany) Markus Eisenbichler	(Poland) Piotr Żyła	(Norway) Halvor Egner Granerud	
1010	8	29 December 2020	(Germany) Oberstdorf (Schattenberg HS137)	L _{725}	(Germany) Karl Geiger	(Poland) Kamil Stoch	(Norway) Marius Lindvik	(Norway) Halvor Egner Granerud	
1011	9	1 January 2021	(Germany) Garmisch-Pa (Gr. Olympiaschanze HS142)	L _{726}	(Poland) Dawid Kubacki	(Norway) Halvor Egner Granerud	(Poland) Piotr Żyła	(Norway) Halvor Egner Granerud	
1012	10	3 January 2021	(Austria) Innsbruck (Bergiselschanze HS128)	L _{727}	(Poland) Kamil Stoch	(Slovenia) Anže Lanišek	(Poland) Dawid Kubacki	(Norway) Halvor Egner Granerud	
1013	11	6 January 2021	(Austria) Bischofshofen (Paul-Ausserleitner HS142)	L _{728}	(Poland) Kamil Stoch	(Norway) Marius Lindvik	(Germany) Karl Geiger	(Norway) Halvor Egner Granerud	
69th Four Hills Tournament Overall (29 December 2020 – 6 January 2021)					(Poland) Kamil Stoch	(Germany) Karl Geiger	(Poland) Dawid Kubacki	4H Tournament	
1014	12	9 January 2021	(Germany) Titisee-Neustadt (Hochfirstschanze HS142)	L _{729}	(Poland) Kamil Stoch	(Norway) Halvor Egner Granerud	(Poland) Piotr Żyła	(Norway) Halvor Egner Granerud	
1015	13	10 January 2021	(Germany) Titisee-Neustadt (Hochfirstschanze HS142)	L _{730}	(Norway) Halvor Egner Granerud	(Norway) Daniel-André Tande	(Austria) Stefan Kraft	(Norway) Halvor Egner Granerud	
1016	14	17 January 2021	(Poland) Zakopane (Wielka Krokiew HS140)	L _{731}	(Norway) Marius Lindvik	(Slovenia) Anže Lanišek	(Norway) Robert Johansson	(Norway) Halvor Egner Granerud	
1017	15	24 January 2021	(Finland) Lahti (Salpausselkä HS130)	L _{732}	(Norway) Robert Johansson	(Germany) Markus Eisenbichler	(Germany) Karl Geiger	(Norway) Halvor Egner Granerud	
qualifying		29 January 2021	(Germany) Willingen (Mühlenkopfschanze HS147)	L _{Qro}	(Poland) Andrzej Stękała	(Norway) Halvor Egner Granerud	(Germany) Markus Eisenbichler	—	
1018	16	30 January 2021	(Germany) Willingen (Mühlenkopfschanze HS147)	L _{733}	(Norway) Halvor Egner Granerud	(Norway) Daniel-André Tande	(Poland) Kamil Stoch	(Norway) Halvor Egner Granerud	
qualifying		(Note: Men's individual event in Willingen (31 January) had only one round due to wind conditions.)31 January 2021	(Germany) Willingen (Mühlenkopfschanze HS147)	L _{Qro}	cancelled due to wind conditions			—	
1019	17	31 January 2021	(Germany) Willingen (Mühlenkopfschanze HS147)	L _{734}	(Norway) Halvor Egner Granerud	(Poland) Piotr Żyła	(Germany) Markus Eisenbichler	(Norway) Halvor Egner Granerud	
4th Willingen Six Overall (29 – 31 January 2021)					(Norway) Halvor Egner Granerud	(Norway) Daniel-André Tande	(Germany) Markus Eisenbichler	Willingen Six	
		6 January 2021	(Japan) Sapporo (Okurayama HS137)	L _{cnx}	cancelled due to the COVID-19 pandemic			—	
		7 January 2021	(Japan) Sapporo (Okurayama HS137)	L _{cnx}	cancelled due to the COVID-19 pandemic			—	
1020	18	(Note: Men's individual event in Sapporo (6 February) was moved to Klingenthal (on the same day) due to COVID-19 pandemic.)6 February 2021	(Germany) Klingenthal (Vogtland Arena HS140)	L _{735}	(Norway) Halvor Egner Granerud	(Poland) Kamil Stoch	(Slovenia) Bor Pavlovčič	(Norway) Halvor Egner Granerud	
1021	19	(Note: Men's individual event in Sapporo (7 February) was moved to Klingenthal (on the same day) due to COVID-19 pandemic.)7 February 2021	(Germany) Klingenthal (Vogtland Arena HS140)	L _{736}	(Norway) Halvor Egner Granerud	(Slovenia) Bor Pavlovčič	(Germany) Markus Eisenbichler	(Norway) Halvor Egner Granerud	
		13 February 2021	(China) Zhangjiakou (Snow Ruyi HS140)	L _{cnx}	cancelled due to the COVID-19 pandemic in early December (both rescheduled to Zakopane on 13 and 14 February)			—	
		14 February 2021	(China) Zhangjiakou (Snow Ruyi HS140)	L _{cnx}	cancelled due to the COVID-19 pandemic in early December (both rescheduled to Zakopane on 13 and 14 February)			—	
1022	20	(Note: Men's individual event in Zhangjiakou (13 February) was moved to Zakopane (on the same day) COVID-19 pandemic.)13 February 2021	(Poland) Zakopane (Wielka Krokiew HS140)	L _{737}	(Japan) Ryōyū Kobayashi	(Poland) Andrzej Stękała	(Norway) Marius Lindvik	(Norway) Halvor Egner Granerud	
1023	21	(Note: Men's individual event in Zhangjiakou (13 February) was moved to Zakopane (on the same day) COVID-19 pandemic.)14 February 2021	(Poland) Zakopane (Wielka Krokiew HS140)	L _{738}	(Norway) Halvor Egner Granerud	(Slovenia) Anže Lanišek	(Norway) Robert Johansson	(Norway) Halvor Egner Granerud	
1024	22	19 February 2021	(Romania) Râșnov (Trambulina Valea HS97)	N _{159}	(Japan) Ryōyū Kobayashi	(Poland) Kamil Stoch	(Germany) Karl Geiger	(Norway) Halvor Egner Granerud	
FIS Nordic World Ski Championships 2021 (27 February – 5 March • (Germany) Oberstdorf)
prologue		12 March 2021	(Norway) Oslo (Holmenkollbakken HS134)	L _{Qro}	cancelled due to the COVID-19 pandemic (Vikersund event was rescheduled to Planica on 25 March)			—	
team		13 March 2021	(Norway) Oslo (Holmenkollbakken HS134)	L _{T}	cancelled due to the COVID-19 pandemic (Vikersund event was rescheduled to Planica on 25 March)			—	
		14 March 2021	(Norway) Oslo (Holmenkollbakken HS134)	L _{cnx}	cancelled due to the COVID-19 pandemic (Vikersund event was rescheduled to Planica on 25 March)			—	
prologue		15 March 2020	(Norway) Lillehammer (Lysgårdsbakken HS140)	L _{Qro}	cancelled due to the COVID-19 pandemic (Vikersund event was rescheduled to Planica on 25 March)			—	
		16 March 2021	(Norway) Lillehammer (Lysgårdsbakken HS140)	L _{cnx}	cancelled due to the COVID-19 pandemic (Vikersund event was rescheduled to Planica on 25 March)			—	
prologue		17 March 2021	(Norway) Trondheim (Granåsen HS138)	L _{Qro}	cancelled due to the COVID-19 pandemic (Vikersund event was rescheduled to Planica on 25 March)			—	
		18 March 2021	(Norway) Trondheim (Granåsen HS138)	L _{cnx}	cancelled due to the COVID-19 pandemic (Vikersund event was rescheduled to Planica on 25 March)			—	
prologue		19 March 2021	(Norway) Vikersund (Vikersundbakken HS240)	F _{Qro}	cancelled due to the COVID-19 pandemic (Vikersund event was rescheduled to Planica on 25 March)			—	
team		20 March 2021	(Norway) Vikersund (Vikersundbakken HS240)	F _{T}	cancelled due to the COVID-19 pandemic (Vikersund event was rescheduled to Planica on 25 March)			—	
		21 March 2021	(Norway) Vikersund (Vikersundbakken HS240)	F _{cnx}	cancelled due to the COVID-19 pandemic (Vikersund event was rescheduled to Planica on 25 March)			—	
Raw Air Men's Overall (12 – 21 March 2021)					no men's Raw Air tournament this season			Raw Air	
1025	23	(Note: Men's cancelled individual ski flying event in Vikersund (21 March) was rescheduled to Planica (25 March).)25 March 2021	(Slovenia) Planica (Letalnica b. Gorišek HS240)	F _{128}	(Japan) Ryōyū Kobayashi	(Germany) Markus Eisenbichler	(Germany) Karl Geiger	(Norway) Halvor Egner Granerud	
qualifying		26 March 2021	(Slovenia) Planica (Letalnica b. Gorišek HS240)	F _{Qro}	cancelled due to wind conditions			—	
1026	24	(Note: Men's individual ski flying event in Planica (26 March) had only one round due to strong wind.)26 March 2021	(Slovenia) Planica (Letalnica b. Gorišek HS240)	F _{129}	(Germany) Karl Geiger	(Japan) Ryōyū Kobayashi	(Slovenia) Bor Pavlovčič	(Norway) Halvor Egner Granerud	
team		27 March 2021	(Slovenia) Planica (Letalnica b. Gorišek HS240)	F _{cnx}	cancelled due to wind after 21 jumpers and replaced on 28 March			—	
team		(Note: Men's cancelled individual ski flying event in Planica (27 March) was rescheduled on 28 March with only one round due to strong wind.)28 March 2021	(Slovenia) Planica (Letalnica b. Gorišek HS240)	F _{024}	(Norway) Halvor Egner Granerud	(Austria) Daniel Huber	(Germany) Markus Eisenbichler	—	
1027	25	28 March 2021	(Slovenia) Planica (Letalnica b. Gorišek HS240)	F _{130}	(Germany) Karl Geiger	(Japan) Ryōyū Kobayashi	(Germany) Markus Eisenbichler	(Norway) Halvor Egner Granerud	
3rd Planica7 Overall (24 – 28 March 2021)					(Germany) Karl Geiger	(Japan) Ryōyū Kobayashi	(Germany) Markus Eisenbichler	Planica7	
42nd FIS World Cup Men's Overall (22 November 2020 – 28 March 2021)					(Norway) Halvor Egner Granerud	(Germany) Markus Eisenbichler	(Poland) Kamil Stoch	World Cup Overall	

=== Standings ===
==== Overall ====
Rank	after all 25 events	Points
	(Norway) H. Egner Granerud	1572
2	(Germany) Markus Eisenbichler	1190
3	(Poland) Kamil Stoch	955
4	(Japan) Ryōyū Kobayashi	919
5	(Norway) Robert Johansson	884
6	(Germany) Karl Geiger	826
7	(Poland) Piotr Żyła	825
8	(Poland) Dawid Kubacki	786
9	(Slovenia) Anže Lanišek	775
10	(Norway) Marius Lindvik	612

==== Nations Cup ====
Rank	after all 30 events	Points
	Norway	5429
2	Poland	4738
3	Germany	4361
4	Austria	3522
5	Slovenia	3235
6	Japan	3111
7	Russia	591
8	Switzerland	508
9	Finland	340
10	Canada	116

==== Prize money ====
Rank	after all 33 payouts	CHF
1	(Norway) Halvor Egner Granerud	207,100
2	(Germany) Markus Eisenbichler	144,550
3	(Poland) Kamil Stoch	138,950
4	(Germany) Karl Geiger	119,900
5	(Norway) Robert Johansson	106,400
6	(Japan) Ryōyū Kobayashi	102,150
7	(Poland) Piotr Żyła	100,950
8	(Poland) Dawid Kubacki	100,100
9	(Norway) Daniel-André Tande	84,800
10	(Slovenia) Anže Lanišek	82,500

==== Ski flying ====
Rank	after all 3 events	Points
	(Germany) Karl Geiger (2 wins)	260
2	(Japan) R. Kobayashi (1 win)	260
3	(Germany) Markus Eisenbichler	172
4	(Slovenia) Bor Pavlovčič	141
5	(Slovenia) Domen Prevc	132
6	(Austria) Daniel Huber	114
7	(Norway) Robert Johansson	110
8	(Japan) Yukiya Satō	109
9	(Austria) Michael Hayböck	94
10	(Poland) Piotr Żyła	82

==== Four Hills Tournament ====
Rank	after all 4 events	Points
1	(Poland) Kamil Stoch	1110.6
2	(Germany) Karl Geiger	1062.5
3	(Poland) Dawid Kubacki	1057.8
4	(Norway) Halvor Egner Granerud	1057.4
5	(Poland) Piotr Żyła	1037.2
6	(Japan) Ryōyū Kobayashi (Poland) Andrzej Stękała	1032.5
8	(Austria) Stefan Kraft	1019.1
9	(Slovenia) Peter Prevc	1018.0
10	(Austria) Daniel Huber	1014.7

==== Willingen Six ====
Rank	after all 3 events	Points
1	(Norway) Halvor Egner Granerud	574.0
2	(Norway) Daniel-André Tande	533.0
3	(Germany) Markus Eisenbichler	517.4
4	(Poland) Piotr Żyła	512.6
5	(Poland) Dawid Kubacki	503.7
6	(Slovenia) Bor Pavlovčič	487.6
7	(Japan) Ryōyū Kobayashi (Norway) Marius Lindvik	482.4
9	(Poland) Kamil Stoch	481.9
10	(Norway) Robert Johansson	476.2

==== Planica7 ====
Rank	after all 3 events	Points
1	(Germany) Karl Geiger	902.2
2	(Japan) Ryōyū Kobayashi	894.6
3	(Germany) Markus Eisenbichler	880.9
4	(Slovenia) Domen Prevc	878.4
5	(Slovenia) Bor Pavlovčič	876.9
6	(Austria) Daniel Huber	871.7
7	(Japan) Yukiya Satō	859.3
8	(Norway) Robert Johansson	848.8
9	(Austria) Michael Hayböck	829.0
10	(Norway) Halvor Egner Granerud	827.5

== Women's Individual ==
Individual events in the World Cup history

Total	FH	LH	NH	Winners
164	—	31	133	21

after LH event in Chaykovsky (28 March 2021)

=== Calendar ===
N – normal hill; L – large hill
All	No.	Date	Place (Hill)	Size	Winner	Second	Third	Overall leader	R.
		5 December 2020	(Norway) Lillehammer (Lysgårdsbakken HS98 / 140)	N _{Qro}	cancelled due to the COVID-19 pandemic (rescheduled to 13 and 14 February)			—	
		6 December 2020	(Norway) Lillehammer (Lysgårdsbakken HS98 / 140)	L _{cnx}	cancelled due to the COVID-19 pandemic (rescheduled to 13 and 14 February)			—	
152	1	18 December 2020	(Austria) Ramsau (W90-Mattensprung. HS98)	N _{124}	(Austria) Marita Kramer	(Slovenia) Nika Križnar	(Japan) Sara Takanashi	(Austria) Marita Kramer	
		9 January 2021	(Japan) Sapporo (Okurayama HS137)	L _{cnx}	cancelled due to the COVID-19 pandemic			—	
		10 January 2021	(Japan) Sapporo (Okurayama HS137)	L _{cnx}	cancelled due to the COVID-19 pandemic			—	
		15 January 2021	(Japan) Zaō (Yamagata HS102)	N _{cnx}	cancelled due to the COVID-19 pandemic			—	
		17 January 2021	(Japan) Zaō (Yamagata HS102)	N _{cnx}	cancelled due to the COVID-19 pandemic			—	
153	2	24 January 2021	(Slovenia) Ljubno (Savina HS94)	N _{125}	(Norway) Eirin Maria Kvandal	(Slovenia) Ema Klinec	(Austria) Marita Kramer	(Austria) Marita Kramer	
154	3	30 January 2021	(Germany) Titisee-Neustadt (Hochfirstschanze HS142)	L _{029}	(Austria) Marita Kramer	(Norway) Silje Opseth	(Slovenia) Ema Klinec	(Austria) Marita Kramer	
155	4	31 January 2021	(Germany) Titisee-Neustadt (Hochfirstschanze HS142)	L _{030}	(Austria) Marita Kramer	(Japan) Sara Takanashi	(Norway) Silje Opseth	(Austria) Marita Kramer	
156	5	5 February 2021	(Austria) Hinzenbach (Aigner-Schanze HS90)	N _{126}	(Slovenia) Nika Križnar	(Slovenia) Ema Klinec	(Norway) Eirin Maria Kvandal	(Austria) Marita Kramer	
157	6	6 February 2021	(Austria) Hinzenbach (Aigner-Schanze HS90)	N _{127}	(Japan) Sara Takanashi	(Slovenia) Nika Križnar	(Norway) Silje Opseth	(Austria) Marita Kramer	
158	7	7 February 2021	(Austria) Hinzenbach (Aigner-Schanze HS90)	N _{128}	(Japan) Sara Takanashi	(Slovenia) Nika Križnar	(Norway) Silje Opseth	(Austria) Marita Kramer	
		11 February 2021	(China) Zhangjiakou (Snow Ruyi HS106)	N _{cnx}	cancelled due to the COVID-19 pandemic (this was decided in early December 2020)			—	
		12 February 2021	(China) Zhangjiakou (Snow Ruyi HS106)	N _{cnx}	cancelled due to the COVID-19 pandemic (this was decided in early December 2020)			—	
		(Note: Women's cancelled individual HS98 event in Lillehammer (5 December) was rescheduled to 13 February and finally cancelled due to COVID-19 pandemic.)13 February 2021	(Norway) Lillehammer (Lysgårdsbakken HS98 / 140)	N _{Qro}	rescheduled original events from December (eventually cancelled due to the COVID-19 pandemic)			—	
		(Note: Women's cancelled individual HS140 event in Lillehammer (6 December) was rescheduled to 13 February and finally cancelled due to COVID-19 pandemic.)14 February 2021	(Norway) Lillehammer (Lysgårdsbakken HS98 / 140)	L _{cnx}	rescheduled original events from December (eventually cancelled due to the COVID-19 pandemic)			—	
159	8	18 February 2021	(Romania) Râșnov (Trambulina Valea HS97)	N _{129}	(Slovenia) Nika Križnar	(Japan) Sara Takanashi	(Norway) Silje Opseth	(Slovenia) Nika Križnar	
160	9	19 February 2021	(Romania) Râșnov (Trambulina Valea HS97)	N _{130}	(Japan) Sara Takanashi	(Norway) Silje Opseth	(Slovenia) Nika Križnar	(Slovenia) Nika Križnar	
FIS Nordic World Ski Championships 2021 (25 February – 3 March • (Germany) Oberstdorf)
prologue		13 March 2021	(Norway) Oslo (Holmenkollbakken HS134)	L _{Qro}	cancelled due to the COVID-19 pandemic			—	
		14 March 2021	(Norway) Oslo (Holmenkollbakken HS134)	L _{cnx}	cancelled due to the COVID-19 pandemic			—	
prologue		15 March 2020	(Norway) Lillehammer (Lysgårdsbakken HS140)	L _{Qro}	cancelled due to the COVID-19 pandemic			—	
		16 March 2021	(Norway) Lillehammer (Lysgårdsbakken HS140)	L _{cnx}	cancelled due to the COVID-19 pandemic			—	
prologue		17 March 2021	(Norway) Trondheim (Granåsen HS138)	L _{Qro}	cancelled due to the COVID-19 pandemic			—	
		18 March 2021	(Norway) Trondheim (Granåsen HS138)	L _{cnx}	cancelled due to the COVID-19 pandemic			—	
Raw Air Women's Overall (13 – 18 March 2021)					no women's Raw Air tournament this season			Raw Air	
161	10	20 March 2021	(Russia) Nizhny Tagil (Tramplin Stork HS97)	N _{131}	(Austria) Marita Kramer	(Japan) Sara Takanashi	(Slovenia) Nika Križnar	(Japan) Sara Takanashi	
162	11	21 March 2021	(Russia) Nizhny Tagil (Tramplin Stork HS97)	N _{132}	(Austria) Marita Kramer	(Slovenia) Nika Križnar	(Japan) Sara Takanashi	(Slovenia) Nika Križnar	
163	12	26 March 2021	(Russia) Chaykovsky (Snezhinka HS102)	N _{133}	(Austria) Marita Kramer	(Japan) Sara Takanashi	(Slovenia) Nika Križnar	(Japan) Sara Takanashi	
164	13	(Note: Women's individual event in Chaykovsky (28 March) had only one round due to strong wind.)28 March 2021	(Russia) Chaykovsky (Snezhinka HS102)	L _{031}	(Austria) Marita Kramer	(Norway) Silje Opseth	(Slovenia) Nika Križnar	(Slovenia) Nika Križnar	
2nd Russia Tour Blue Bird Overall (19 – 28 March 2021)					(Austria) Marita Kramer	(Japan) Sara Takanashi	(Slovenia) Nika Križnar	Blue Bird	
10th FIS World Cup Men's Overall (18 December 2020 – 28 March 2021)					(Slovenia) Nika Križnar	(Japan) Sara Takanashi	(Austria) Marita Kramer	World Cup Overall	

=== Standings ===
==== Overall ====
Rank	after all 13 events	Points
	(Slovenia) Nika Križnar	871
2	(Japan) Sara Takanashi	862
3	(Austria) Marita Kramer	860
4	(Norway) Silje Opseth	692
5	(Austria) Daniela Iraschko-Stolz	516
6	(Slovenia) Ema Klinec	492
7	(Russia) Irina Avvakumova	349
8	(Norway) Maren Lundby	338
9	(Germany) Katharina Althaus	316
10	(Austria) Chiara Hölzl	308

==== Nations Cup ====
Rank	after all 16 events	Points
	Austria	3053
2	Slovenia	2833
3	Norway	2480
4	Japan	2050
5	Germany	1408
6	Russia	948
7	France	448
8	Czech Republic	181
9	Italy	156
10	Poland	110

==== Prize money ====
Rank	after all 17 payouts	CHF
1	(Slovenia) Nika Križnar	44,848
2	(Austria) Marita Kramer	44,430
3	(Japan) Sara Takanashi	39,756
4	(Norway) Silje Opseth	36,432
5	(Austria) Daniela Iraschko-Stolz	27,358
6	(Slovenia) Ema Klinec	25,354
7	(Norway) Maren Lundby	20,999
8	(Austria) Chiara Hölzl	13,346
9	(Russia) Irina Avvakumova	12,863
10	(Germany) Katharina Althaus	12,258

==== Russia Tour Blue Bird ====
Rank	after all 4 events	Points
1	(Austria) Marita Kramer	869.4
2	(Japan) Sara Takanashi	798.3
3	(Slovenia) Nika Križnar	789.2
4	(Norway) Silje Opseth	778.9
5	(Austria) Daniela Iraschko-Stolz	740.9
6	(Austria) Chiara Hölzl	732.4
7	(Russia) Irina Avvakumova	720.9
8	(Germany) Katharina Althaus	720.1
9	(Norway) Thea Minyan Bjørseth	701.3
10	(Slovenia) Ema Klinec	696.9

== Team events ==
Team events in the World Cup history

Total	FH	LH	NH	Winners	Competition
111	24	85	2	7	Men's team
8	—	—	8	4	Women's team
3	—	—	3	2	Mixed team

after FH event in Planica (28 March 2021)

=== Calendar ===
All	No.	Date	Place (Hill)	Size	Winner	Second	Third	R.
Men's team
108	1	21 November 2020	(Poland) Wisła (Malinka HS134)	L _{083}	Austria Michael Hayböck; Philipp Aschenwald; Daniel Huber; Stefan Kraft	Germany Constantin Schmid; Pius Paschke; Karl Geiger; Markus Eisenbichler	Poland Piotr Żyła; Klemens Murańka; Dawid Kubacki; Kamil Stoch	
109	2	16 January 2021	(Poland) Zakopane (Wielka Krokiew HS140)	L _{084}	Austria Michael Hayböck; Jan Hörl; Philipp Aschenwald; Daniel Huber	Poland Piotr Żyła; Kamil Stoch; Andrzej Stękała; Dawid Kubacki	Norway Daniel-André Tande; Halvor Egner Granerud; Marius Lindvik; Robert Johansson	
110	3	23 January 2021	(Finland) Lahti (Salpausselkä HS130)	L _{085}	Norway Marius Lindvik; Daniel-André Tande; Robert Johansson; Halvor Egner Granerud	Poland Piotr Żyła; Andrzej Stękała; Kamil Stoch; Dawid Kubacki	Germany Pius Paschke; Martin Hamann; Markus Eisenbichler; Karl Geiger	
		27 March 2021	(Slovenia) Planica (Letalnica b. Gorišek HS240)	F _{cnx}	cancelled due to wind after 21 jumpers and replaced on 28 March			
111	4	(Note: Men's cancelled team event in Planica (27 March) was reschedule on 28 March with only one round.)28 March 2021	(Slovenia) Planica (Letalnica b. Gorišek HS240)	F _{024}	Germany Pius Paschke; Constantin Schmid; Markus Eisenbichler; Karl Geiger	Japan Naoki Nakamura; Junshiro Kobayashi; Yukiya Satō; Ryōyū Kobayashi	Austria Daniel Huber; Markus Schiffner; Stefan Kraft; Michael Hayböck	
Women's team
		16 January 2021	(Japan) Zaō (Yamagata HS102)	N _{cnx}	cancelled due to the COVID-19 pandemic			
7	1	23 January 2021	(Slovenia) Ljubno (Savina HS94)	N _{007}	Slovenia Ema Klinec; Špela Rogelj; Urša Bogataj; Nika Križnar	Norway Eirin Maria Kvandal; Thea Minyan Bjørseth; Silje Opseth; Maren Lundby	Austria Daniela Iraschko-Stolz; Lisa Eder; Chiara Hölzl; Marita Kramer	
		27 March 2021	(Russia) Chaykovsky (Snezhinka HS102)	N _{cnx}	cancelled due to strong wind and rescheduled on 28 March			
8	2	(Note: Women's cancelled team event in Chaykovsky (27 March) was reschedule on 28 March with only one round.)28 March 2021	(Russia) Chaykovsky (Snezhinka HS102)	N _{008}	Austria Daniela Iraschko-Stolz; Sophie Sorschag; Chiara Hölzl; Marita Kramer	Slovenia Špela Rogelj; Katra Komar; Urša Bogataj; Nika Križnar	Germany Katharina Althaus; Juliane Seyfarth; Luisa Görlich; Anna Rupprecht	
Mixed team
3	1	20 February 2021	(Romania) Râșnov (Trambulina Valea HS9)	N _{003}	Norway Maren Lundby; Daniel-André Tande; Silje Opseth; Halvor Egner Granerud	Slovenia Nika Križnar; Cene Prevc; Ema Klinec; Žiga Jelar	Austria Eva Pinkelnig; Daniel Tschofenig; Daniela Iraschko-Stolz; Manuel Fettner	

== Points distribution ==
The table shows the number of points won in the 2020–21 FIS Ski Jumping World Cup for men and women.

Place	1	2	3	4	5	6	7	8	9	10	11	12	13	14	15	16	17	18	19	20	21	22	23	24	25	26	27	28	29	30
Individual	100	80	60	50	45	40	36	32	29	26	24	22	20	18	16	15	14	13	12	11	10	9	8	7	6	5	4	3	2	1
M/W Team	400	350	300	250	200	150	100	50	points not awarded
Mixed Team	200	175	150	125	100	75	50	25	points not awarded

== Qualifications ==
=== Men ===
No.	Place	Qualifications	Competition	Size	Winner
1	(Poland) Wisła	20 November 2020	22 November 2020	L	(Poland) Kamil Stoch
2	(Finland) Ruka	27 November 2020	28 November 2020	L	(Poland) Dawid Kubacki
3	(Finland) Ruka	29 November 2020		L	(Germany) Pius Paschke
4	(Russia) Nizhny Tagil	4 December 2020	5 December 2020	L	(Germany) Markus Eisenbichler
5	(Russia) Nizhny Tagil	6 December 2020		L	(Norway) Marius Lindvik
6	(Switzerland) Engelberg	18 December 2020	19 December 2020	L	(Japan) Yukiya Satō
7	(Switzerland) Engelberg	20 December 2020		L	(Norway) Halvor Egner Granerud
8	(Germany) Oberstdorf	28 December 2020	29 December 2020	L	(Austria) Philipp Aschenwald
9	(Germany) Garmisch-Pa	31 December 2020	1 January 2021	L	(Slovenia) Anže Lanišek
10	(Austria) Innsbruck	2 January 2021	3 January 2021	L	(Norway) Halvor Egner Granerud
11	(Austria) Bischofshofen	5 January 2021	6 January 2021	L	(Poland) Kamil Stoch
12	(Germany) Titisee-Neustadt	8 January 2021	9 January 2021	L	prologue instead of qualifications due to insufficient number of competitors won by Halvor Egner Granerud.
12	(Germany) Titisee-Neustadt	10 January 2021		L	qualifications cancelled due to insufficient number of competitors.
13	(Poland) Zakopane	15 January 2021	17 January 2021	L	(Japan) Yukiya Satō
14	(Finland) Lahti	24 January 2021		L	(Poland) Piotr Żyła
15	(Germany) Willingen	29 January 2021	30 January 2021	L	(Poland) Andrzej Stękała
16	(Germany) Willingen	31 January 2021		L	qualifications cancelled due to wind conditions - all 55 competed
17	(Germany) Klingenthal	5 February 2021	6 February 2021	L	cancelled due to insufficient number of competitors; there was a prologue in which Halvor Egner Granerud won.
18	(Germany) Klingenthal	7 February 2021		L	cancelled due to insufficient number of competitors; there was a prologue in which Robert Johansson won.
19	(Poland) Zakopane	12 February 2021	13 February 2021	L	(Norway) Robert Johansson
20	(Poland) Zakopane	14 February 2021		L	cancelled due to insufficient number of competitors; there was a prologue in which Dawid Kubacki won.
21	(Romania) Râșnov	18 February 2021	19 February 2021	N	cancelled due to insufficient number of competitors; there was a prologue in which Markus Eisenbichler won.
22	(Slovenia) Planica	24 March 2021	25 March 2021	F	(Japan) Ryōyū Kobayashi
23	(Slovenia) Planica	26 March 2021		F	qualifications cancelled due to wind conditions - all 67 competed

=== Women ===
No.	Place	Qualifications	Competition	Size	Winner
1	(Austria) Ramsau	17 December 2020	18 December 2020	N	(Austria) Marita Kramer
2	(Slovenia) Ljubno	22 January 2021	24 January 2021	N	(Norway) Silje Opseth
3	(Germany) Titisee-Neustadt	30 January 2021		L	(Austria) Marita Kramer
4	(Germany) Titisee-Neustadt	31 January 2021		L	(Norway) Silje Opseth
5	(Austria) Hinzenbach	4 February 2021	5 February 2021	N	(Japan) Sara Takanashi
6	(Austria) Hinzenbach	6 February 2021		N	(Japan) Sara Takanashi
7	(Austria) Hinzenbach	7 February 2021		N	(Japan) Sara Takanashi
8	(Romania) Râșnov	18 February 2021		N	(Slovenia) Nika Križnar
9	(Romania) Râșnov	19 February 2021		N	(Norway) Silje Opseth
10	(Russia) Nizhny Tagil	20 March 2021		N	(Austria) Daniela Iraschko-Stolz
11	(Russia) Nizhny Tagil	21 March 2021		N	(Austria) Marita Kramer
12	(Russia) Chaykovsky	25 March 2021	26 March 2021	N	(Austria) Marita Kramer

== Achievements ==
First World Cup career victory

Men

- (Norway) H. Egner Granerud (24), in his sixth season – the WC 3 in Ruka

Women

- (Norway) Eirin Maria Kvandal (19), in her first season – the WC 2 in Ljubno
- (Slovenia) Nika Križnar (20), in her sixth season – the WC 5 in Hinzenbach

First World Cup podium

Men

- (Norway) H. Egner Granerud (24), in his sixth season – the WC 3 in Ruka
- (Slovenia) Bor Pavlovčič (23), in his fifth season – the WC 18 in Klingenthal
- (Poland) A. Stękała (25), in his fourth season – the WC 20 in Zakopane

Women

- (Norway) Eirin Maria Kvandal (19), in her first season – the WC 2 in Ljubno

Number of wins this season (in brackets are all-time wins)

Men

- (Norway) Halvor Egner Granerud – 11 (11)
- (Poland) Kamil Stoch – 3 (39)
- (Japan) Ryōyū Kobayashi – 3 (19)
- (Germany) Karl Geiger – 3 (9)
- (Germany) Markus Eisenbichler – 2 (3)
- (Poland) Dawid Kubacki – 1 (5)
- (Norway) Marius Lindvik – 1 (3)
- (Norway) Robert Johansson – 1 (3)

Women

- (Austria) Marita Kramer – 7 (8)
- (Japan) Sara Takanashi – 3 (60)
- (Slovenia) Nika Križnar – 2 (2)
- (Norway) Eirin Maria Kvandal – 1 (1)

== Retirements ==
The following ski jumpers retired during or after the 2020–21 season:

Men

- (France) Paul Brasme
- (Slovenia) Jernej Damjan
- (Germany) Tim Fuchs
- (Slovenia) Tjaš Grilc
- (Slovenia) Rok Justin
- (South Korea) Choi Seou
- (Austria) Gregor Schlierenzauer
- (Czech Republic) Vojtěch Štursa
- (Russia) Dmitriy Vassiliev
- (Germany) Paul Winter

Women

- (United States) Sarah Hendrickson
- (France) Léa Lemare

== See also ==
- 2020 Grand Prix (top level summer series)
- 2020–21 FIS Continental Cup (2nd level competition)
