= FIS Nordic World Ski Championships 2019 – Mixed team normal hill =

Mixed team normal hill at the FIS Nordic World Ski Championships 2019
- Location: Seefeld in Tirol, Austria
- Dates: 2 March
- Competitors: 52 from 13 nations
- Teams: 13
- Winning points: 1012.2

Medalists
gold medal	Katharina Althaus; Markus Eisenbichler; Juliane Seyfarth; Karl Geiger	Germany
silver medal	Eva Pinkelnig; Philipp Aschenwald; Daniela Iraschko-Stolz; Stefan Kraft	Austria
bronze medal	Anna Odine Strøm; Robert Johansson; Maren Lundby; Andreas Stjernen	Norway

The Mixed team normal hill competition at the FIS Nordic World Ski Championships 2019 was held on 2 March 2019.

== Results ==
The first round was started at 16:00 and the final round at 17:10.

Rank	Bib	Country	Round 1			Final round			Total
Rank	Bib	Country	Distance (m)	Points	Rank	Distance (m)	Points	Rank	Points
1st place, gold medalist(s)	13	Germany; Katharina Althaus; Markus Eisenbichler; Juliane Seyfarth; Karl Geiger	107.5; 104.5; 100.5; 103.5	491.0; 126.5; 121.6; 115.9; 127.0	1	103.0; 107.0; 103.0; 107.0	521.2; 123.9; 135.0; 125.3; 137.0	1	1012.2; 250.4; 256.6; 241.2; 264.0
2nd place, silver medalist(s)	11	Austria; Eva Pinkelnig; Philipp Aschenwald; Daniela Iraschko-Stolz; Stefan Kraft	105.5; 110.0; 100.5; 96.5	487.1; 123.1; 131.3; 117.0; 115.7	2	103.5; 101.0; 102.5; 104.5	502.8; 132.1; 117.3; 123.1; 130.3	2	989.9; 255.2; 248.6; 240.1; 246.0
3rd place, bronze medalist(s)	10	Norway; Anna Odine Strøm; Robert Johansson; Maren Lundby; Andreas Stjernen	97.5; 106.5; 99.0; 91.5	440.0; 105.7; 121.6; 112.8; 99.9	4	102.5; 103.5; 105.5; 102.0	498.4; 115.8; 123.3; 132.1; 127.2	3	938.4; 221.5; 244.9; 244.9; 227.1
4	8	Slovenia; Urša Bogataj; Žiga Jelar; Nika Križnar; Peter Prevc	102.5; 99.5; 98.5; 95.5	437.2; 111.8; 108.9; 108.5; 108.0	6	101.0; 104.0; 108.5; 100.5	493.6; 118.5; 121.0; 131.8; 122.3	4	930.8; 230.3; 229.9; 240.3; 230.3
5	12	Japan; Yuki Ito; Yukiya Satō; Sara Takanashi; Ryoyu Kobayashi	100.5; 103.5; 91.0; 97.0	437.3; 110.3; 118.2; 94.9; 113.9	5	95.0; 102.0; 99.5; 113.0	491.3; 108.6; 121.6; 115.9; 145.2	5	928.6; 218.9; 239.8; 210.8; 259.1
6	9	Poland; Kinga Rajda; Dawid Kubacki; Kamila Karpiel; Kamil Stoch	91.5; 112.0; 91.5; 100.0	440.6; 90.8; 134.4; 93.9; 121.5	3	97.0; 110.0; 97.0; 105.5	474.3; 103.3; 131.0; 108.3; 131.7	6	914.9; 194.1; 265.4; 202.2; 253.2
7	7	Russia; Anna Shpyneva; Dmitriy Vassiliev; Sofia Tikhonova; Evgeniy Klimov	97.5; 99.5; 96.0; 101.5	430.6; 103.0; 104.3; 103.9; 119.4	7	100.5; 104.0; 98.5; 99.0	465.6; 119.4; 120.1; 108.8; 117.3	7	896.2; 222.4; 224.4; 212.7; 236.7
8	5	Italy; Elena Runggaldier; Sebastian Colloredo; Manuela Malsiner; Alex Insam	97.5; 93.0; 98.5; 86.5	377.0; 99.2; 93.7; 102.2; 81.9	8	95.5; 97.5; 100.5; 94.5	424.4; 104.9; 102.6; 112.3; 104.6	8	801.4; 204.1; 196.3; 214.5; 186.5
9	6	Czech Republic; Karolína Indráčková; Viktor Polášek; Štěpánka Ptáčková; Roman Koudelka	91.0; 97.5; 92.0; 96.0	374.4; 82.1; 100.1; 88.4; 103.8	9	did not advance			
10	3	United States; Nina Lussi; Kevin Bickner; Nita Englund; Casey Larson	86.0; 96.5; 90.0; 95.5	364.9; 74.2; 101.6; 89.2; 99.9	10	did not advance			
11	4	Finland; Susanna Forsström; Jarkko Määttä; Julia Kykkänen; Antti Aalto	90.0; 91.0; 87.5; 97.0	354.8; 79.7; 88.4; 79.2; 107.5	11	did not advance			
12	2	Romania; Andreea Trâmbițaș; Hunor Farkas; Daniela Haralambie; Radu Mihai Păcurar	78.5; 81.0; 100.0; 88.5	311.1; 53.3; 70.3; 104.7; 82.8	12	did not advance			
13	1	Kazakhstan; Valentina Sderzhikova; Sabirzhan Muminov; Veronika Shishkina; Sergey Tkachenko	88.5; 87.5; DSQ; 96.0	256.8; 73.7; 81.7; 0.0; 101.4	13	did not advance			
