= Pius Paschke =

German ski jumper (born 1990)

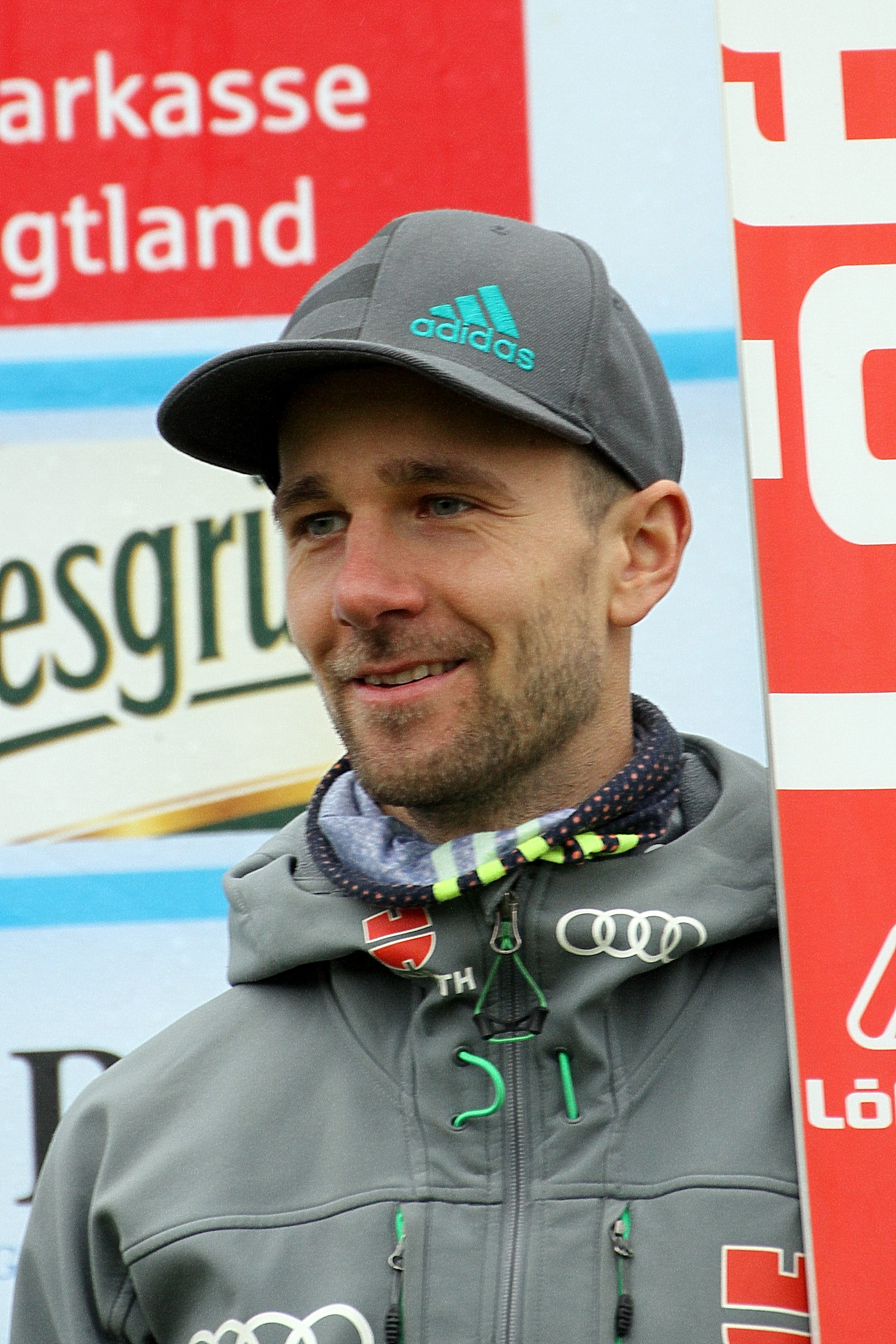
- Paschke in 2017

Personal information
- Nationality: Germany
- Born: 20 May 1990 (age 36) Munich, Germany
- Height: 1.75 m (5 ft 9 in)

Sport
- Sport: Skiing
- Club: WSV Kiefersfelden

World Cup career
- Seasons: 2013–present
- Indiv. starts: 162
- Indiv. podiums: 10
- Indiv. wins: 6
- Team starts: 15
- Team podiums: 11
- Team wins: 3

Achievements and titles
- Personal bests: 237.0 m (777.6 ft); Planica, 30 March 2025
Medal record
Representing Germany
Men's ski jumping
World Championships
Gold medal – first place	2021 Oberstdorf	Team LH
Men's ski flying
World Championships
Silver medal – second place	2020 Planica	Team
Bronze medal – third place	2024 Bad Mitterndorf	Team
- Updated on 21 December 2024

Pius Paschke (born 20 May 1990) is a German ski jumper who competes for the WSV Kiefersfelden club. He is a team gold medalist from the 2021 World Championships, as well as a team silver (2020) and bronze medalist (2024) from the FIS Ski Flying World Championships.

Paschke made his World Cup debut in Engelberg on 21 December 2013. There, he claimed his first World Cup victory during the 2023–24 season. His second win came at the opening event of the 2024–25 season in Lillehammer, making him the oldest World Cup leader in history at 34 years and 187 days old. Additionally, he has achieved ten podiums in team events, including three victories with the German team.

== Record ==
=== FIS World Nordic Ski Championships ===
Event	Normal hill	Large hill	Team LH	Mixed Team
(Germany) 2021 Oberstdorf	11	18	1st place, gold medalist(s)	–
(Norway) 2025 Trondheim	30	30		

=== FIS Ski Flying World Championships ===
Event	Individual	Team
(Slovenia) 2020 Planica	11	2nd place, silver medalist(s)
(Austria) 2024 Bad Mitterndorf	23	3rd place, bronze medalist(s)
(Germany) 2026 Oberstdorf	25	4

== World Cup ==
=== Season standings ===
Season				Tour Standings			
Season	Overall	4H	SF	RA	W6	T5	P7
2013/14	—	—	—	N/A	N/A	N/A	N/A
2014/15	82	—	51	N/A	N/A	N/A	N/A
2015/16	74	39	—	N/A	N/A	N/A	N/A
2016/17	—	48	—	—	N/A	N/A	N/A
2017/18	30	39	36	—	—	N/A	25
2018/19	59	40	—	46	—	N/A	62
2019/20	21	20	16	15	26	33	N/A
2020/21	15	30	13	—	19	N/A	12
2021/22	33	29	—	—	N/A	N/A	—
2022/23	34	30	42	—	N/A	N/A	27
2023/24	10	20	18	20	N/A	N/A	9
2024/25	5	4	13	22	N/A	N/A	7

=== Individual wins ===
No.	Season	Date	Location	Hill	Size
1	2023–24	16 December 2023	(Switzerland) Engelberg	Gross-Titlis-Schanze HS140	LH
2	2024–25	24 November 2024	(Norway) Lillehammer	Lysgårdsbakken HS140	LH
3	2024–25	30 November 2024	(Finland) Ruka	Rukatunturi HS142	LH
4	2024–25	8 December 2024	(Poland) Wisła	Malinka HS134	LH
5	2024–25	14 December 2024	(Germany) Titisee-Neustadt	Hochfirstschanze HS142	LH
6	2024–25	15 December 2024	(Germany) Titisee-Neustadt	Hochfirstschanze HS142	LH

=== Individual starts ===
Season	1	2	3	4	5	6	7	8	9	10	11	12	13	14	15	16	17	18	19	20	21	22	23	24	25	26	27	28	29	30	31	32	Points
2013/14	Klingenthal	Kuusamo	Lillehammer	Lillehammer	Titisee-Neustadt	Titisee-Neustadt	Engelberg	Engelberg	Oberstdorf	Garmisch-Partenkirchen	Innsbruck	Bischofshofen	Tauplitz	Tauplitz	Wisła	Zakopane	Sapporo	Sapporo	Willingen	Willingen	Falun	Lahti	Lahti	Kuopio	Trondheim	Oslo	Planica	Planica					0
2013/14	–	–	–	–	–	–	47	41	–	–	–	–	–	–	–	–	41	44	–	–	–	–	–	–	–	–	–	–					0
2014/15	Klingenthal	Kuusamo	Kuusamo	Lillehammer	Lillehammer	Nizhny Tagil	Nizhny Tagil	Engelberg	Engelberg	Oberstdorf	Garmisch-Partenkirchen	Innsbruck	Bischofshofen	Tauplitz	Wisła	Zakopane	Sapporo	Sapporo	Willingen	Willingen	Titisee-Neustadt	Titisee-Neustadt	Vikersund	Vikersund	Lahti	Kuopio	Trondheim	Oslo	Oslo	Planica	Planica		2
2014/15	–	–	–	–	–	–	–	–	–	–	–	–	–	–	–	–	–	–	–	–	–	–	29	35	–	–	–	–	–	q	–		2
2015/16	Klingenthal	Lillehammer	Lillehammer	Nizhny Tagil	Nizhny Tagil	Engelberg	Engelberg	Oberstdorf	Garmisch-Partenkirchen	Innsbruck	Bischofshofen	Willingen	Zakopane	Sapporo	Sapporo	Trondheim	Vikersund	Vikersund	Vikersund	Lahti	Lahti	Kuopio	Almaty	Almaty	Wisła	Titisee-Neustadt	Planica	Planica	Planica				2
2015/16	–	–	–	–	–	–	–	29	33	–	–	–	–	–	–	–	–	–	–	–	–	–	–	–	–	–	–	–	–				2
2016/17	Kuusamo	Kuusamo	Klingenthal	Lillehammer	Lillehammer	Engelberg	Engelberg	Oberstdorf	Garmisch-Partenkirchen	Innsbruck	Bischofshofen	Wisła	Wisła	Zakopane	Willingen	Oberstdorf	Oberstdorf	Sapporo	Sapporo	Pyeongchang	Pyeongchang	Oslo	Trondheim	Vikersund	Planica	Planica							0
2016/17	–	–	–	–	–	–	–	33	33	–	–	–	–	–	–	31	q	q	q	38	q	–	–	–	–	–							0
2017/18	Wisła	Kuusamo	Nizhny Tagil	Nizhny Tagil	Titisee-Neustadt	Engelberg	Engelberg	Oberstdorf	Garmisch-Partenkirchen	Innsbruck	Bischofshofen	Tauplitz	Zakopane	Willingen	Willingen	Lahti	Oslo	Lillehammer	Trondheim	Vikersund	Planica	Planica											90
2017/18	12	14	17	24	24	27	35	35	45	49	38	27	–	–	–	25	–	–	–	–	26	28											90
2018/19	Wisła	Kuusamo	Kuusamo	Nizhny Tagil	Nizhny Tagil	Engelberg	Engelberg	Oberstdorf	Garmisch-Partenkirchen	Innsbruck	Bischofshofen	Val di Fiemme	Val di Fiemme	Zakopane	Sapporo	Sapporo	Oberstdorf	Oberstdorf	Oberstdorf	Lahti	Willingen	Willingen	Oslo	Lillehammer	Trondheim	Vikersund	Planica	Planica					10
2018/19	39	–	–	–	–	–	–	21	35	–	–	–	–	–	–	–	–	–	–	–	–	–	q	45	42	39	q	–					10
2019/20	Wisła	Kuusamo	Nizhny Tagil	Nizhny Tagil	Klingenthal	Engelberg	Engelberg	Oberstdorf	Garmisch-Partenkirchen	Innsbruck	Bischofshofen	Val di Fiemme	Val di Fiemme	Titisee-Neustadt	Titisee-Neustadt	Zakopane	Sapporo	Sapporo	Willingen	Tauplitz	Tauplitz	Râșnov	Râșnov	Lahti	Lahti	Lillehammer	Lillehammer						353
2019/20	26	20	28	11	19	10	13	12	20	33	28	8	18	32	26	14	11	25	24	18	17	10	21	34	19	14	15						353
2020/21	Wisła	Ruka	Ruka	Nizhny Tagil	Nizhny Tagil	Engelberg	Engelberg	Oberstdorf	Garmisch-Partenkirchen	Innsbruck	Bischofshofen	Titisee-Neustadt	Titisee-Neustadt	Zakopane	Lahti	Willingen	Willingen	Klingenthal	Klingenthal			Râșnov	Planica	Planica	Planica								514
2020/21	12	8	21	5	14	6	5	33	16	37	29	17	12	13	10	24	8	7	14	14	30	7	13	20	11								514
2021/22	Nizhny Tagil	Nizhny Tagil	Ruka	Ruka	Wisła	Klingenthal	Klingenthal	Engelberg	Engelberg	Oberstdorf	Garmisch-Partenkirchen	Bischofshofen	Bischofshofen	Bischofshofen	Zakopane	Titisee-Neustadt	Titisee-Neustadt	Willingen	Willingen	Lahti	Lahti	Lillehammer	Oslo	Oslo	Oberstdorf	Oberstdorf	Planica	Planica					174
2021/22	26	15	7	38	7	11	29	21	9	26	31	46	23	28	46	33	31	31	33	55	37	–	–	–	–	–	–	–					174
2022/23	Wisła	Wisła	Ruka	Ruka	Titisee-Neustadt	Titisee-Neustadt	Engelberg	Engelberg	Oberstdorf	Garmisch-Partenkirchen	Innsbruck	Bischofshofen	Zakopane	Sapporo	Sapporo	Sapporo	Tauplitz	Tauplitz	Willingen	Willingen	Lake Placid	Lake Placid	Râșnov	Oslo	Oslo	Lillehammer	Lillehammer	Vikersund	Vikersund	Lahti	Planica	Planica	168
2022/23	12	15	18	8	22	13	11	14	41	24	28	45	–	–	–	–	39	q	q	–	–	–	–	–	–	–	–	–	–	–	34	27	168
2023/24	Ruka	Ruka	Lillehammer	Lillehammer	Klingenthal	Klingenthal	Engelberg	Engelberg	Oberstdorf	Garmisch-Partenkirchen	Innsbruck	Bischofshofen	Wisła	Zakopane	Willingen	Willingen	Lake Placid	Lake Placid	Sapporo	Sapporo	Oberstdorf	Oberstdorf	Lahti	Lahti	Oslo	Oslo	Trondheim	Trondheim	Vikersund	Vikersund	Planica	Planica	778
2023/24	2	4	6	7	5	8	1	3	11	10	36	8	17	15	26	25	25	35	34	34	21	17	12	9	14	25	17	11	15	24	10	13	778
2024/25	Lillehammer	Lillehammer	Ruka	Ruka	Wisła	Wisła	Titisee-Neustadt	Titisee-Neustadt	Engelberg	Engelberg	Oberstdorf	Garmisch-Partenkirchen	Innsbruck	Bischofshofen	Zakopane	Oberstdorf	Oberstdorf	Willingen	Willingen	Lake Placid	Lake Placid	Sapporo	Sapporo	Oslo	Vikersund	Vikersund	Lahti	Planica	Planica				1006
2024/25	1	2	1	7	3	1	1	1	10	18	4	9	8	12	32	18	21	27	31	-	-	23	31	35	9	25	12	10	6				1006

=== Podiums ===
Season	Podiums			
Season	Medals			Total
Season	1st place, gold medalist(s)	2nd place, silver medalist(s)	3rd place, bronze medalist(s)	
2023/24	1	1	1	3
2024/25	5	1	1	7
Total	6	2	2	10
