= Robert Johansson =

Norwegian ski jumper (born 1990)

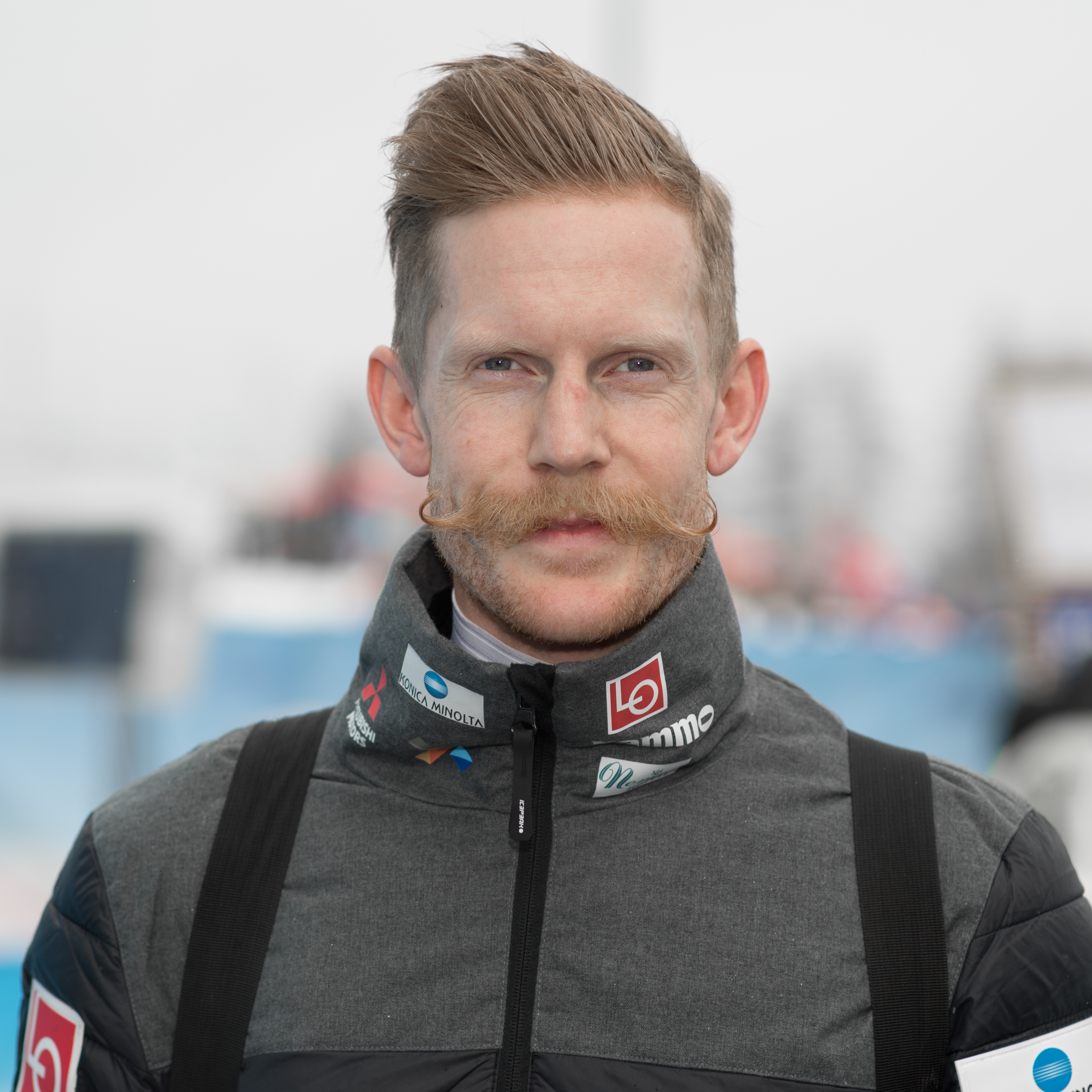
- Johansson in 2019

Personal information
- Full name: Robert Høneren Johansson
- Nationality: Norway
- Born: 23 March 1990 (age 36) Lillehammer, Norway
- Height: 1.84 m (6 ft 0 in)

Sport
- Sport: Skiing
- Club: Søre Ål IL

World Cup career
- Seasons: 2014–2025
- Indiv. starts: 201
- Indiv. podiums: 16
- Indiv. wins: 3
- Team starts: 33
- Team podiums: 17
- Team wins: 11

Achievements and titles
- Personal bests: 252 m (827 ft); Vikersund, 18 March 2017
Medal record
Men's ski jumping
Olympic Games
Gold medal – first place	2018 Pyeongchang	Team LH
Bronze medal – third place	2018 Pyeongchang	Individual NH
Bronze medal – third place	2018 Pyeongchang	Individual LH
World Championships
Silver medal – second place	2021 Oberstdorf	Individual LH
Silver medal – second place	2021 Oberstdorf	Mixed team NH
Bronze medal – third place	2019 Seefeld	Mixed team NH
European Games
Silver medal – second place	2023 Kraków–Małopolska	Mixed team NH
Men's ski flying
Ski Flying World Championships
Gold medal – first place	2018 Oberstdorf	Team
Gold medal – first place	2020 Planica	Team
Bronze medal – third place	2022 Vikersund	Team
- Updated on 24 March 2024

Robert Høneren Johansson (born 23 March 1990) is a Norwegian former ski jumper. He held the ski flying world record in 2017, landing a jump of 252 m (827 ft) in Vikersund. Johansson has often been nicknamed the "Wing Commander" for his distinctive handlebar moustache. He announced his retirement on May 20, 2025.

== Ski jumping career ==
He finished fourth in the team competition at the 2009 Junior World Ski Championships, and also competed at the 2010 Junior World Ski Championships. In January 2012 he took his first Continental Cup podium, with a third place in Neustadt, and in March 2012 he won his first Continental Cup race in Kuopio. In the World Cup he has finished once among the top 15, with a 13th place from Kuusamo in November 2013. He managed two more top-20 placements that season, with a 20th and a 19th place from Sapporo in January 2014.

At the 2018 Winter Olympics in Pyeongchang, South Korea, Johansson won bronze in both the men's normal hill individual and men's large hill individual event.

=== FIS Ski Flying World Championships ===
Event	Individual	Team
(Germany) 2018 Oberstdorf	9	1st place, gold medalist(s)
(Slovenia) 2020 Planica	5	1st place, gold medalist(s)

== World Cup ==
=== Standings ===
Season	Overall	4H	SF	RA	W6	T5	P7	NT
2008/09	—	—	—	N/A	N/A	N/A	N/A	—
2013/14	61	—	—	N/A	N/A	N/A	N/A	N/A
2014/15	75	—	—	N/A	N/A	N/A	N/A	N/A
2015/16	58	—	31	N/A	N/A	N/A	N/A	N/A
2016/17	16	26	15	9	N/A	N/A	N/A	N/A
2017/18	5	5	2nd place, silver medalist(s)	2nd place, silver medalist(s)	4	N/A	3rd place, bronze medalist(s)	N/A
2018/19	6	8	12	3rd place, bronze medalist(s)	13	N/A	19	N/A
2019/20	17	12	7	6	21	11	N/A	N/A
2020/21	5	17	7	N/A	10	N/A	8	N/A
2021/22	12	6	—	7	N/A	N/A	—	N/A
2022/23	21	16	17	20	N/A	N/A	12	N/A
2023/24	29	—	13	25	N/A	N/A	14	N/A

=== Wins ===
No.	Season	Date	Location	Hill	Size
1	2017/18	18 March 2018	(Norway) Vikersund	Vikersundbakken HS240	FH
2	2018/19	10 March 2019	(Norway) Oslo	Holmenkollbakken HS134	LH
3	2020/21	24 January 2021	(Finland) Lahti	Salpausselkä HS130 (night)	LH

=== Individual starts (201) ===
Season	1	2	3	4	5	6	7	8	9	10	11	12	13	14	15	16	17	18	19	20	21	22	23	24	25	26	27	28	29	30	31	32	Points
2008/09	Kuusamo	Trondheim	Trondheim	Pragelato	Pragelato	Engelberg	Engelberg	Oberstdorf	Garmisch-Partenkirchen	Innsbruck	Bischofshofen	Tauplitz	Tauplitz	Zakopane	Zakopane	Whistler	Whistler	Sapporo	Willingen	Klingenthal	Oberstdorf	Lahti	Kuopio	Lillehammer	Vikersund	Planica	Planica						0
2008/09	–	–	–	–	–	–	–	–	–	–	–	–	–	–	–	–	–	–	–	–	–	–	–	–	q	–	–						0
2013/14	Klingenthal	Kuusamo	Lillehammer	Lillehammer	Titisee-Neustadt	Titisee-Neustadt	Engelberg	Engelberg	Oberstdorf	Garmisch-Partenkirchen	Innsbruck	Bischofshofen	Tauplitz	Tauplitz	Wisła	Zakopane	Sapporo	Sapporo	Willingen	Willingen	Falun	Lahti	Lahti	Kuopio	Trondheim	Oslo	Planica	Planica					43
2013/14	–	13	42	50	q	q	41	46	–	–	–	–	34	39	41	35	20	19	46	35	–	–	–	–	–	–	–	–					43
2014/15	Klingenthal	Kuusamo	Kuusamo	Lillehammer	Lillehammer	Nizhny Tagil	Nizhny Tagil	Engelberg	Engelberg	Oberstdorf	Garmisch-Partenkirchen	Innsbruck	Bischofshofen	Tauplitz	Wisła	Zakopane	Sapporo	Sapporo	Willingen	Willingen	Titisee-Neustadt	Titisee-Neustadt	Vikersund	Vikersund	Lahti	Kuopio	Trondheim	Oslo	Oslo	Planica	Planica		5
2014/15	–	–	–	26	–	–	–	–	–	–	–	–	–	–	–	–	44	45	–	–	–	–	37	–	–	–	–	–	–	–	–¨		5
2015/16	Klingenthal	Lillehammer	Lillehammer	Nizhny Tagil	Nizhny Tagil	Engelberg	Engelberg	Oberstdorf	Garmisch-Partenkirchen	Innsbruck	Bischofshofen	Willingen	Zakopane	Sapporo	Sapporo	Oslo	Trondheim	Vikersund	Vikersund	Lahti	Lahti	Kuopio	Almaty	Almaty	Wisła	Titisee-Neustadt	Planica	Planica	Planica				19
2015/16	–	–	–	–	–	–	–	–	–	–	–	–	–	–	–	–	25	33	18	–	–	–	–	–	–	–	–	–	–				19
2016/17	Kuusamo	Kuusamo	Klingenthal	Lillehammer	Lillehammer	Engelberg	Engelberg	Oberstdorf	Garmisch-Partenkirchen	Innsbruck	Bischofshofen	Wisła	Wisła	Zakopane	Willingen	Oberstdorf	Oberstdorf	Sapporo	Sapporo	Pyeongchang	Pyeongchang	Oslo	Trondheim	Vikersund	Planica	Planica							424
2016/17	–	–	25	14	31	34	23	39	30	2	20	22	9	q	24	27	14	22	7	10	10	6	29	10	8	7							424
2017/18	Wisła	Kuusamo	Nizhny Tagil	Nizhny Tagil	Titisee-Neustadt	Engelberg	Engelberg	Oberstdorf	Garmisch-Partenkirchen	Innsbruck	Bischofshofen	Tauplitz	Zakopane	Willingen	Willingen	Lahti	Oslo	Lillehammer	Trondheim	Vikersund	Planica	Planica											840
2017/18	13	7	26	11	5	9	15	11	17	7	5	4	12	8	4	12	4	3	3	1	4	4											840
2018/19	Wisła	Kuusamo	Kuusamo	Nizhny Tagil	Nizhny Tagil	Engelberg	Engelberg	Oberstdorf	Garmisch-Partenkirchen	Innsbruck	Bischofshofen	Val di Fiemme	Val di Fiemme	Zakopane	Sapporo	Sapporo	Oberstdorf	Oberstdorf	Oberstdorf	Lahti	Willingen	Willingen	Oslo	Lillehammer	Trondheim	Vikersund	Planica	Planica					974
2018/19	16	8	7	6	9	17	7	7	19	11	9	13	4	2	3	9	17	5	15	3	17	15	1	2	10	6	25	16					974
2019/20	Wisła	Kuusamo	Nizhny Tagil	Nizhny Tagil	Klingenthal	Engelberg	Engelberg	Oberstdorf	Garmisch-Partenkirchen	Innsbruck	Bischofshofen	Val di Fiemme	Val di Fiemme	Titisee-Neustadt	Titisee-Neustadt	Zakopane	Sapporo	Sapporo	Willingen	Tauplitz	Tauplitz	Râșnov	Râșnov	Lahti	Lahti	Oslo	Lillehammer						503
2019/20	11	DQ	25	9	11	9	8	8	14	17	16	38	26	13	15	15	14	15	25	8	8	–	–	12	8	5	13						503
2020/21	Wisła	Ruka	Ruka	Nizhny Tagil	Nizhny Tagil	Engelberg	Engelberg	Oberstdorf	Garmisch-Partenkirchen	Innsbruck	Bischofshofen	Titisee-Neustadt	Titisee-Neustadt	Zakopane	Lahti	Willingen	Willingen	Klingenthal	Klingenthal	Zakopane	Zakopane	Râșnov	Planica	Planica	Planica								884
2020/21	44	6	6	3	2	44	11	39	18	12	5	6	20	3	1	13	11	8	4	9	3	11	7	5	9								884
2021/22	Nizhny Tagil	Nizhny Tagil	Ruka	Ruka	Wisła	Klingenthal	Klingenthal	Engelberg	Engelberg	Oberstdorf	Garmisch-Partenkirchen	Bischofshofen	Bischofshofen	Bischofshofen	Zakopane	Titisee-Neustadt	Titisee-Neustadt	Willingen	Willingen	Lahti	Lahti	Lillehammer	Oslo	Oslo	Oberstdorf	Oberstdorf	Planica	Planica					531
2021/22	9	11	12	50	10	8	4	13	21	3	13	7	6	34	–	–	–	15	12	23	31	11	3	8	–	–	–	–					531
2022/23	Wisła	Wisła	Ruka	Ruka	Titisee-Neustadt	Titisee-Neustadt	Engelberg	Engelberg	Oberstdorf	Garmisch-Partenkirchen	Innsbruck	Bischofshofen	Zakopane	Sapporo	Sapporo	Sapporo	Bad Mitterndorf	Bad Mitterndorf	Willingen	Willingen	Lake Placid, New York	Lake Placid, New York	Râșnov	Oslo	Oslo	Lillehammer	Lillehammer	Vikersund	Vikersund	Lahti	Planica	Planica	387
2022/23	11	13	20	16	13	7	13	9	25	16	17	21	–	12	26	37	37	23	–	–	–	–	–	q	23	17	33	9	6	21	15	16	387
2023/24	Ruka	Ruka	Lillehammer	Lillehammer	Klingenthal	Klingenthal	Engelberg	Engelberg	Oberstdorf	Garmisch-Partenkirchen	Innsbruck	Bischofshofen	Wisła	Zakopane	Willingen	Willingen	Lake Placid, New York	Lake Placid, New York	Sapporo	Sapporo	Oberstdorf	Oberstdorf	Lahti	Lahti	Oslo	Oslo	Trondheim	Trondheim	Vikersund	Vikersund	Planica	Planica	195
2023/24	–	–	–	q	–	–	–	–	–	–	–	–	–	–	q	17	–	–	–	–	–	–	20	15	44	5	39	38	5	15	19	7	195

== Ski jumping national record ==
Date	Hill	Location	Nation	Metres	Feet
18 March 2017	Vikersundbakken HS240	Vikersund	Norway	252	827

== Moustache ==
Johansson competed in the 2018 Winter Olympics with a manicured handlebar moustache which he began growing two years earlier. The moustache attracted considerable media attention.
