= Halvor Egner Granerud =

Norwegian ski jumper (born 1996)

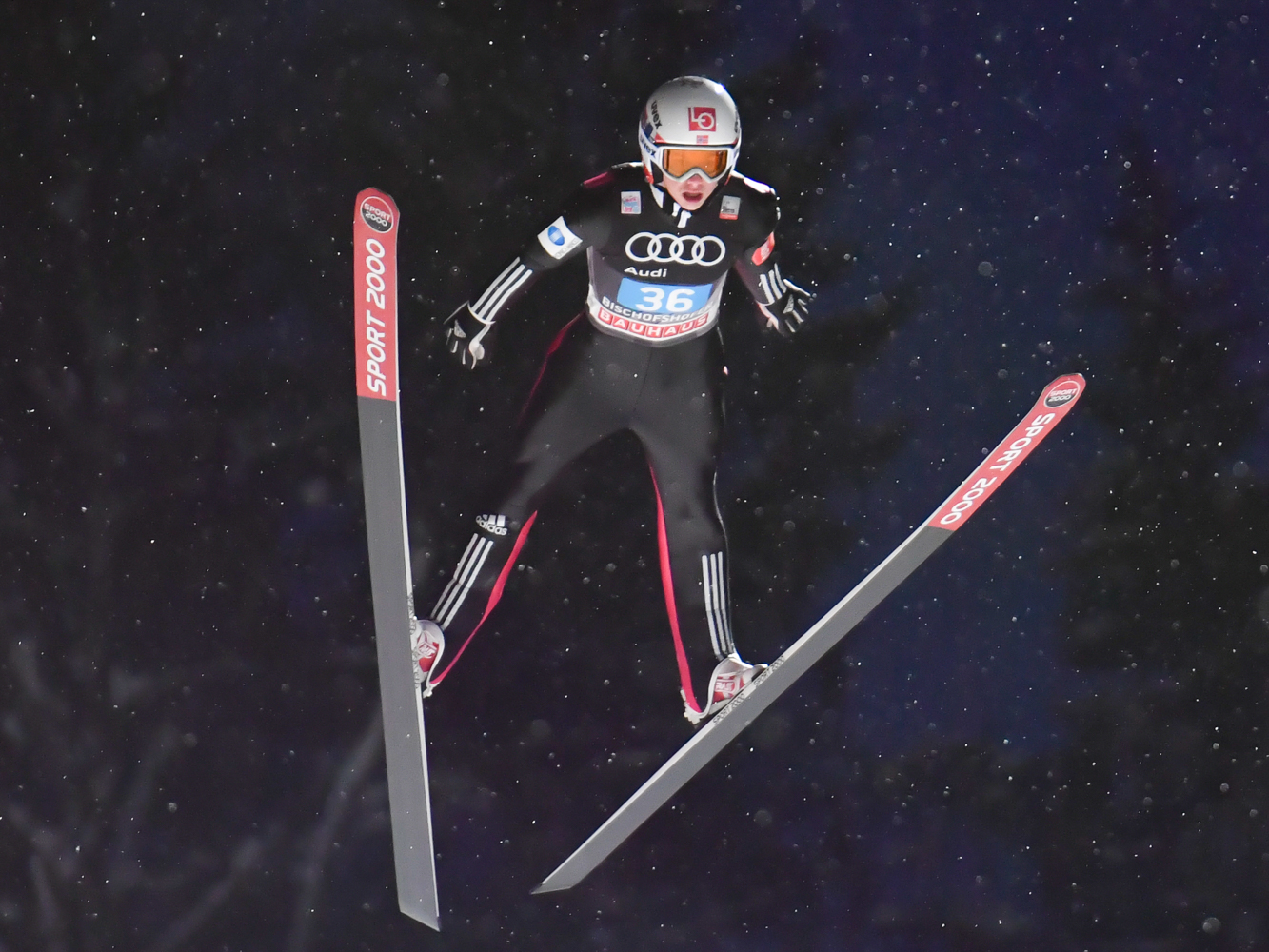
- Granerud in Bischofshofen, 2017

Personal information
- Nationality: Norway
- Born: 29 May 1996 (age 30) Oslo, Norway
- Height: 1.75 m (5 ft 9 in)

Sport
- Sport: Skiing
- Club: Asker Skiklubb

World Cup career
- Seasons: 2015–present
- Indiv. starts: 185
- Indiv. podiums: 41
- Indiv. wins: 25
- Team starts: 25
- Team podiums: 13
- Team wins: 4
- Overall titles: 2 (2021, 2023)
- Four Hills titles: 1 (2023)

Achievements and titles
- Personal bests: 244.5 m (802 ft); Planica, 13 December 2020
Medal record
Representing Norway
Men's ski jumping
World Championships
| Silver medal – second place | 2021 Oberstdorf | Mixed team NH |
| Silver medal – second place | 2023 Planica | Team LH |
| Silver medal – second place | 2023 Planica | Mixed team NH |
Men's ski flying
Ski Flying World Championships
| Gold medal – first place | 2020 Planica | Team |
| Silver medal – second place | 2020 Planica | Individual |
| Bronze medal – third place | 2022 Vikersund | Team |
- Updated on 19 January 2025

Halvor Egner Granerud (born 29 May 1996) is a Norwegian ski jumper. He is one of the most successful contemporary ski jumpers, having won 25 World Cup individual competitions, the World Cup overall title twice, and the Four Hills Tournament once. At the Nordic World Ski Championships, Granerud's best achievements include silver medals in the team and mixed team competitions. He has also won team gold and individual silver at the Ski Flying World Championships.

== Career ==
Granerud made his Ski Jumping World Cup debut in 2015 and got his best result to win the World Cup event in Kuusamo/Ruka in November 2020. Granerud was part of the team that won the FIS Junior World Championship in 2015, together with Joacim Ødegård Bjøreng, Phillip Sjøen and Johann André Forfang. From the 2018–19 season, he's been a part of the national team.

On 11 February 2016, he set his unofficial personal best in Vikersund as a trial jumper when he jumped 240 metres. Two years later in Planica he set his official personal best at 233 metres.

=== 2020/21 World Cup ===
On 29 November 2020, Granerud took his first ever World Cup podium by winning in Kuusamo. At the following weekend, Granerud would win both competitions in Nizhny Tagil, gaining enough points for the leader's jersey. In Planica he would go on to win a silver medal, in the individual competition at the Ski Flying World Championships, and a gold medal in the team competition. The last double header of 2020 would see Granerud win both competitions in Engelberg, making him the first Norwegian to win five World Cup competitions in a row. At the Four Hills Tournament, Granerud finished fourth overall. He also took his first podium in the Four Hills by finishing second in the new year's competition in Garmisch-Partenkirchen.

The first win of 2021 would come in Titisee-Neustadt, where Granerud won the Sunday competition. At the last weekend of January, Granerud won both competitions at Willingen. He won the Willingen Six, with 41 points to countryman Daniel-Andre Tande. The following weekend, Granerud would win both competitions in Klingenthal, therefore extending his lead to over 400 points in the overall World Cup. He would win a week later in Zakopane, and was announced the winner of the overall World Cup on 4 March, due to some competitions being cancelled.

=== 2021/22 World Cup ===
In the first competition of the season, Granerud finished third. The following day, Halvor would win his first competition of the season.

=== 2022/23 World Cup ===
On 1 January, Granerud won his first New Years competition at Garmisch-Partenkirchen. With a continuous form, and by winning three of the four competitions, Granerud won the Overall Four Hills Tournament. Granerud wins his 2nd world cup in his 8th season of ski jumping in world cup, but lacked 30 points to also win the ski flying competition, which was won by Stefan Kraft.

== Personal life ==
Granerud's great-grandfather was Norwegian children's writer Thorbjørn Egner.

== Record ==
=== FIS World Nordic Ski Championships ===
| Event | Normal hill | Large hill | Team LH | Mixed Team NH |
|---|---|---|---|---|
| (Austria) 2019 Seefeld | – | 33 | 5 | – |
| (Germany) 2021 Oberstdorf | 4 | – | – | 2nd place, silver medalist(s) |

=== FIS Ski Flying World Championships ===
| Event | Individual | Team |
|---|---|---|
| (Slovenia) 2020 Planica | 2nd place, silver medalist(s) | 1st place, gold medalist(s) |
| (Norway) 2022 Vikersund | | 3rd place, bronze medalist(s) |

== World Cup ==
=== Standings ===
| Season | Overall | 4H | SF | RA | W6 | T5 | P7 |
|---|---|---|---|---|---|---|---|
| 2015/16 | — | 55 | — | N/A | N/A | N/A | N/A |
| 2016/17 | 42 | 32 | 37 | 45 | N/A | N/A | N/A |
| 2017/18 | 20 | 24 | 20 | 22 | 19 | N/A | 21 |
| 2018/19 | 15 | 35 | 24 | 37 | 14 | N/A | 30 |
| 2019/20 | 61 | — | — | 64 | — | — | N/A |
| 2020/21 | 1st place, gold medalist(s) | 4 | 19 | N/A | 1st place, gold medalist(s) | N/A | 10 |
| 2021/22 | 4 | 3rd place, bronze medalist(s) | 18 | 6 | N/A | N/A | 8 |
| 2022/23 | 1st place, gold medalist(s) | 1st place, gold medalist(s) | 2nd place, silver medalist(s) | 1st place, gold medalist(s) | N/A | N/A | 4 |
| 2023/24 | 24 | 27 | 14 | 23 | N/A | N/A | — |

=== Wins ===
| No. | Season | Date | Location | Hill | Size |
|---|---|---|---|---|---|
| 1 | 2020/21 | 29 November 2020 | (Finland) Ruka | Rukatunturi HS142 (night) | LH |
| 2 | 2020/21 | 5 December 2020 | (Russia) Nizhny Tagil | Tramplin Stork HS134 (night) | LH |
| 3 | 2020/21 | 6 December 2020 | (Russia) Nizhny Tagil | Tramplin Stork HS134 (night) | LH |
| 4 | 2020/21 | 19 December 2020 | (Switzerland) Engelberg | Gross-Titlis-Schanze HS140 (night) | LH |
| 5 | 2020/21 | 20 December 2020 | (Switzerland) Engelberg | Gross-Titlis-Schanze HS140 (night) | LH |
| 6 | 2020/21 | 10 January 2021 | (Germany) Titisee-Neustadt | Hochfirstschanze HS142 (night) | LH |
| 7 | 2020/21 | 30 January 2021 | (Germany) Willingen | Mühlenkopfschanze HS145 (night) | LH |
| 8 | 2020/21 | 31 January 2021 | (Germany) Willingen | Mühlenkopfschanze HS145 (night) | LH |
| 9 | 2020/21 | 6 February 2021 | (Germany) Klingenthal | Vogtland Arena HS140 | LH |
| 10 | 2020/21 | 7 February 2021 | (Germany) Klingenthal | Vogtland Arena HS140 | LH |
| 11 | 2020/21 | 14 February 2021 | (Poland) Zakopane | Wielka Krokiew HS140 | LH |
| 12 | 2021/22 | 21 November 2021 | (Russia) Nizhny Tagil | Tramplin Stork HS134 (night) | LH |
| 13 | 2021/22 | 27 February 2022 | (Finland) Lahti | Salpausselkä HS130 | LH |
| 14 | 2022/23 | 27 November 2022 | (Finland) Ruka | Rukatunturi HS142 | LH |
| 15 | 2022/23 | 29 December 2022 | (Germany) Oberstdorf | Schattenbergschanze HS137 (night) | LH |
| 16 | 2022/23 | 1 January 2023 | (Germany) Garmisch-Partenkirchen | Große Olympiaschanze HS142 | LH |
| 17 | 2022/23 | 6 January 2023 | (Austria) Bischofshofen | Paul-Ausserleitner-Schanze HS142 (night) | LH |
| 18 | 2022/23 | 15 January 2023 | (Poland) Zakopane | Wielka Krokiew HS140 (night) | LH |
| 19 | 2022/23 | 28 January 2023 | (Austria) Tauplitz | Kulm HS235 | FH |
| 20 | 2022/23 | 29 January 2023 | (Austria) Tauplitz | Kulm HS235 | FH |
| 21 | 2022/23 | 4 February 2023 | (Germany) Willingen | Mühlenkopfschanze HS147 (night) | LH |
| 22 | 2022/23 | 5 February 2023 | (Germany) Willingen | Mühlenkopfschanze HS147 (night) | LH |
| 23 | 2022/23 | 12 February 2023 | (United States) Lake Placid | MacKenzie Intervale Complex HS128 (night) | LH |
| 24 | 2022/23 | 14 March 2023 | (Norway) Lillehammer | Lysgårdsbakken HS140 (night) | LH |
| 25 | 2022/23 | 18 March 2023 | (Norway) Vikersund | Vikersundbakken HS240 (night) | FH |

=== Individual starts (171) ===
| Season | 1 | 2 | 3 | 4 | 5 | 6 | 7 | 8 | 9 | 10 | 11 | 12 | 13 | 14 | 15 | 16 | 17 | 18 | 19 | 20 | 21 | 22 | 23 | 24 | 25 | 26 | 27 | 28 | 29 | 30 | 31 | 32 | Points |
| 2015/16 | Klingenthal | Lillehammer | Lillehammer | Nizhny Tagil | Nizhny Tagil | Engelberg | Engelberg | Oberstdorf | Garmisch-Partenkirchen | Innsbruck | Bischofshofen | Willingen | Zakopane | Sapporo | Sapporo | Trondheim | Vikersund | Vikersund | Vikersund | Lahti | Lahti | Kuopio | Almaty | Almaty | Wisła | Titisee-Neustadt | Planica | Planica | Planica | | | | 0 |
| 2015/16 | – | DQ | – | – | – | – | – | – | 46 | 36 | – | – | q | – | – | – | – | – | – | – | – | – | – | – | – | – | – | – | – | | | | 0 |
| 2016/17 | Kuusamo | Kuusamo | Klingenthal | Lillehammer | Lillehammer | Engelberg | Engelberg | Oberstdorf | Garmisch-Partenkirchen | Innsbruck | Bischofshofen | Wisła | Wisła | Zakopane | Willingen | Oberstdorf | Oberstdorf | Sapporo | Sapporo | Pyeongchang | Pyeongchang | Oslo | Trondheim | Vikersund | Planica | Planica | | | | | | | 50 |
| 2016/17 | 36 | 32 | q | – | – | – | – | 28 | 47 | 34 | 37 | 50 | 47 | – | – | – | – | 45 | 26 | 23 | 16 | DQ | 22 | 21 | | – | | | | | | | 50 |
| 2017/18 | Wisła | Kuusamo | Nizhny Tagil | Nizhny Tagil | Titisee-Neustadt | Engelberg | Engelberg | Oberstdorf | Garmisch-Partenkirchen | Innsbruck | Bischofshofen | Tauplitz | Zakopane | Willingen | Willingen | Lahti | Oslo | Lillehammer | Trondheim | Vikersund | Planica | Planica | | | | | | | | | | | 280 |
| 2017/18 | 24 | 22 | 33 | 18 | 37 | 5 | 19 | 23 | 16 | 21 | 32 | 25 | 9 | 17 | 19 | – | 12 | 12 | 14 | 11 | 28 | 20 | | | | | | | | | | | 280 |
| 2018/19 | Wisła | Kuusamo | Kuusamo | Nizhny Tagil | Nizhny Tagil | Engelberg | Engelberg | Oberstdorf | Garmisch-Partenkirchen | Innsbruck | Bischofshofen | Val di Fiemme | Val di Fiemme | Zakopane | Sapporo | Sapporo | Oberstdorf | Oberstdorf | Oberstdorf | Lahti | Willingen | Willingen | Oslo | Lillehammer | Trondheim | Vikersund | Planica | Planica | | | | | 422 |
| 2018/19 | q | 24 | 7 | 9 | 37 | 16 | 21 | q | 9 | DQ | 7 | 25 | 13 | 5 | 7 | 4 | 8 | 15 | 33 | 5 | 14 | 14 | q | 47 | 32 | 28 | 36 | 28 | | | | | 422 |
| 2019/20 | Wisła | Kuusamo | Nizhny Tagil | Nizhny Tagil | Klingenthal | Engelberg | Engelberg | Oberstdorf | Garmisch-Partenkirchen | Innsbruck | Bischofshofen | Val di Fiemme | Val di Fiemme | Titisee-Neustadt | Titisee-Neustadt | Zakopane | Sapporo | Sapporo | Willingen | Tauplitz | Tauplitz | Râșnov | Râșnov | Lahti | Lahti | Oslo | Lillehammer | | | | | | 8 |
| 2019/20 | – | – | – | – | – | – | – | – | – | – | – | – | – | – | – | – | – | – | – | – | – | 31 | 23 | – | – | q | q | | | | | | 8 |
| 2020/21 | Wisła | Ruka | Ruka | Nizhny Tagil | Nizhny Tagil | Engelberg | Engelberg | Oberstdorf | Garmisch-Partenkirchen | Innsbruck | Bischofshofen | Titisee-Neustadt | Titisee-Neustadt | Zakopane | Lahti | Willingen | Willingen | Klingenthal | Klingenthal | Zakopane | Zakopane | Râșnov | Planica | Planica | Planica | | | | | | | | 1572 |
| 2020/21 | 4 | 4 | 1 | 1 | 1 | 1 | 1 | 4 | 2 | 15 | 12 | 2 | 1 | 23 | 4 | 1 | 1 | 1 | 1 | 7 | 1 | 29 | 37 | 18 | 16 | | | | | | | | 1572 |
| 2021–22 | Nizhny Tagil | Nizhny Tagil | Ruka | Ruka | Wisła | Klingenthal | Klingenthal | Engelberg | Engelberg | Oberstdorf | Garmisch-Partenkirchen | Bischofshofen | Bischofshofen | Bischofshofen | Zakopane | Titisee-Neustadt | Titisee-Neustadt | Willingen | Willingen | Lahti | Lahti | Lillehammer | Oslo | Oslo | Oberstdorf | Oberstdorf | Planica | Planica | | | | | 1227 |
| 2021–22 | 3 | 1 | q | q | 48 | 2 | 5 | 7 | 6 | 2 | 8 | 3 | 2 | 2 | 25 | 4 | 7 | 2 | 5 | 2 | 1 | 4 | 24 | 9 | 35 | 33 | 9 | 12 | | | | | 1227 |
| 2022-23 | Wisła | Wisła | Ruka | Ruka | Klingenthal | Klingenthal | Engelberg | Engelberg | Oberstdorf | Garmisch-Partenkirchen | Bischofshofen | Bischofshofen | Zakopane | Sapporo | Sapporo | Sapporo | Bischofshofen | Bischofshofen | Garmisch-Partenkirchen | Garmisch-Partenkirchen | Lake Placid | Lake Placid | Râșnov | Lillehammer | Oslo | Oslo | Lillehammer | Oslo | Oslo | Lahti | Planica | Planica | 1516 |
| 2022-23 | 2 | 4 | 30 | 1 | 5 | 5 | 5 | 4 | 1 | 1 | 2 | 1 | 1 | 3 | 2 | 2 | 1 | 1 | 1 | 1 | 7 | 1 | – | 4 | 7 | 1 | 6 | 1 | 2 | 46 | 4 | 13 | 1516 |
| 2023/24 | Ruka | Ruka | Lillehammer | Lillehammer | Klingenthal | Klingenthal | Engelberg | Engelberg | Oberstdorf | Garmisch-Partenkirchen | Innsbruck | Bischofshofen | Wisła | Zakopane | Willingen | Willingen | Lake Placid, New York | Lake Placid, New York | Sapporo | Sapporo | Oberstdorf | Oberstdorf | Lahti | Lahti | Oslo | Oslo | Trondheim | Trondheim | Vikersund | Vikersund | Planica | Planica | 409 |
| 2023/24 | 16 | 10 | 15 | 17 | 16 | 13 | 4 | 11 | 48 | 31 | 16 | 7 | 42 | 18 | – | – | – | – | – | – | 16 | 14 | 19 | 23 | 27 | 38 | 7 | 33 | 4 | 12 | – | – | 409 |

=== Podiums ===
| Season | Podiums | | | |
| Season | Medals | | | Total |
| Season | 1st place, gold medalist(s) | 2nd place, silver medalist(s) | 3rd place, bronze medalist(s) | |
| 2015/16 | - | - | - | - |
| 2016/17 | - | - | - | - |
| 2017/18 | - | - | - | - |
| 2018/19 | - | - | - | - |
| 2019/20 | - | - | - | - |
| 2020/21 | 11 | 2 | - | 13 |
| 2021/22 | 2 | 6 | 2 | 10 |
| 2022/23 | 12 | 5 | 1 | 18 |
| Total | 25 | 13 | 3 | 41 |
