= FIS Ski Flying World Championships 2020 =

2020 edition of the FIS Ski Flying World Championships

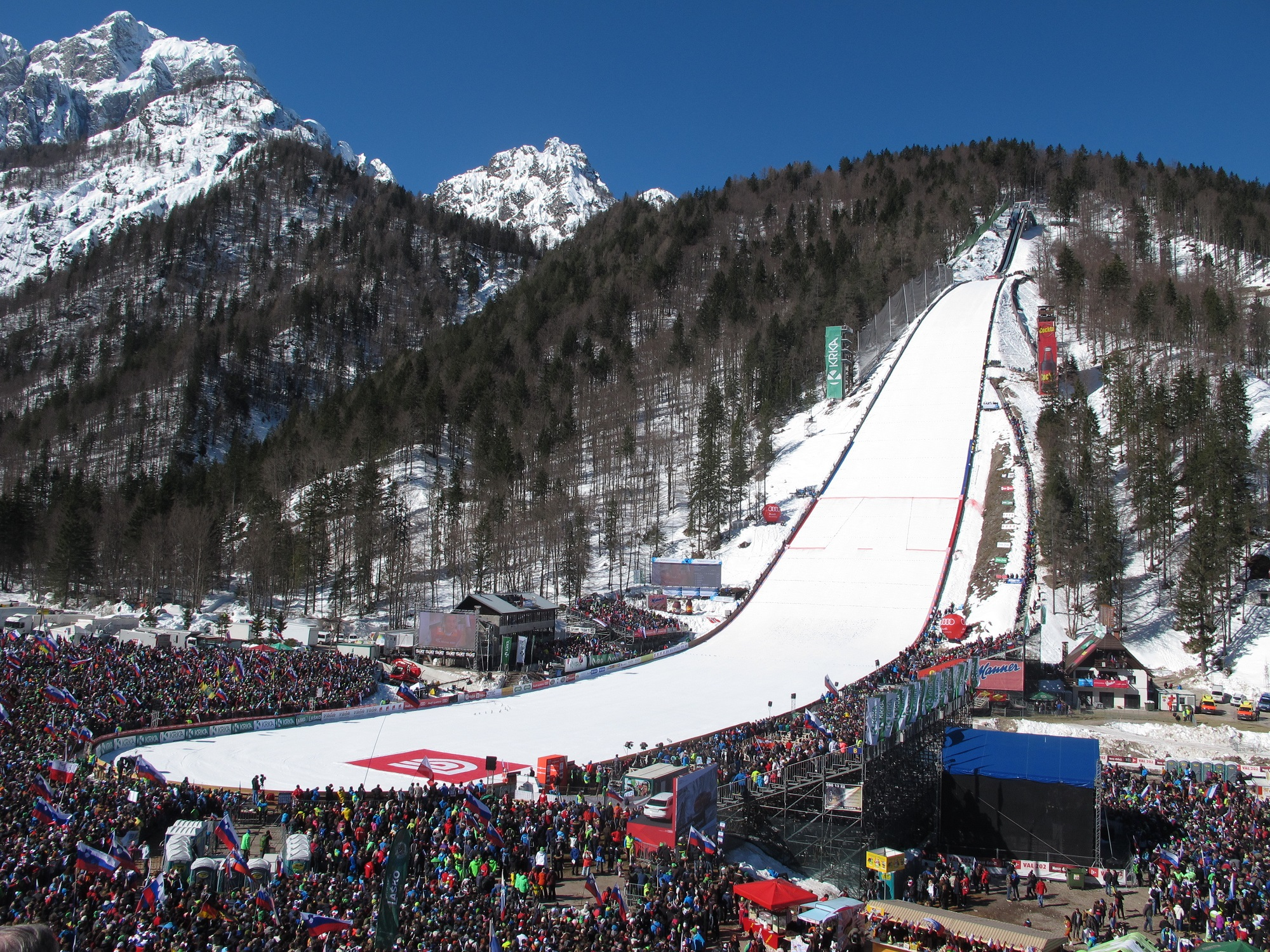
- Host city: Planica, Slovenia
- Sport: Ski flying
- Events: 2
- Opening: 10 December
- Closing: 13 December
- Main venue: Letalnica bratov Gorišek HS240

The FIS Ski Flying World Championships 2020 were the 26th Ski Flying World Championships, held between 10 and 13 December 2020 in Planica, Slovenia.

It was originally scheduled between 19 and 22 March 2020, but on 12 March 2020, it was postponed to the next season due to the COVID-19 pandemic.

== Schedule ==
Date	Competition	Longest jump of the day	Metres	Feet
8 December 2020	Hill test 1	heavy snowfall; 70 cm		
9 December 2020	Hill test 2	(Slovenia) Lovro Kos	225	738
10 December 2020	Official training	(Austria) Michael Hayböck	241	791
10 December 2020	Qualification	(Austria) Michael Hayböck	242.5	795
11 December 2020	1st round Individual	(Austria) Michael Hayböck	245.5	805
11 December 2020	2nd round Individual	(Germany) Markus Eisenbichler	247	809
12 December 2020	3rd round Individual	(Germany) Karl Geiger	240.5	789
12 December 2020	4th round Individual	(Norway) Halvor Egner Granerud	243	797
13 December 2020	1st round Team event	(Germany) Karl Geiger	238	781
13 December 2020	2nd round Team event	(Germany) Markus Eisenbichler	236.5	776

== Test results ==
=== Hill test 1 ===
On 8 December 2020, an additional test for lights was scheduled, but was cancelled due to heavy snowfall.

=== Hill test 2 ===
On 9 December 2020, a second test was held.

Bib	Name	Round 1	Round 2
1	(Slovenia) Rok Tarman	148 m	156 m
2	(Slovenia) Cene Prevc	209 m	210 m
3	(Slovenia) Lovro Kos	209 m	225 m
4	(Slovenia) Andraž Pograjc	194 m	204 m
5	(Slovenia) Lovro Vodušek	144 m	175 m
6	(Slovenia) Matevž Samec	200 m	203 m
7	(Slovenia) Lojze Petek	136 m	182 m
8	(Slovenia) Nik Fabjan	193 m	209 m
9	(Slovenia) Rok Toporiš	169 m	199 m
10	(Slovenia) Jošt Sušnik	134 m	143 m
11	(Slovenia) Domen Presterl	145 m	147 m
12	(Slovenia) Urban Sušnik	125 m	126 m
13	(Slovenia) Matija Štemberger	152 m	148 m
14	(Slovenia) Matija Vidic	133 m	DNS
15	(Slovenia) Gašper Sršen	139 m	142 m
16	(Slovenia) Ernest Prišlič	199 m	207 m
–	(Slovenia) Tilen Bartol	DNS	

== Official training results ==
The training was held on 10 December 2020 at 13:30.

Bib	Name	Round 1	Round 2
1	(Ukraine) Yevhen Marusiak	105 m	124 m
2	(Finland) Niko Kytösaho	157 m	182 m
3	(Canada) Matthew Soukup	185.5 m	177.5 m
4	(United States) Patrick Gasienica	162.5 m	138 m
5	(Finland) Arttu Pohjola	160 m	159 m
6	(Italy) Alex Insam	174 m	189 m
7	(Czech Republic) Filip Sakala	171.5 m	180.5 m
8	(Slovenia) Domen Prevc	215.5 m	221.5 m
9	(Finland) Eetu Nousiainen	175.5 m	185 m
10	(United States) Dean Decker	175.5 m	184.5 m
11	(Austria) Stefan Kraft	239 m	DNS
12	(Finland) Jarkko Määttä	190.5 m	184 m
13	(Austria) Gregor Schlierenzauer	211 m	203.5 m
14	(Ukraine) Vitaliy Kalinichenko	184.5 m	186.5 m
15	(Russia) Ilya Mankov	194 m	193 m
16	(Czech Republic) Čestmír Kožíšek	202 m	191 m
17	(Finland) Andreas Alamommo	173.5 m	167.5 m
18	(United States) Casey Larson	191.5 m	184 m
19	(Russia) Danil Sadreev	191 m	192.5 m
20	(Italy) Giovanni Bresadola	195 m	196.5 m
21	(Austria) Timon-Pascal Kahofer	192 m	205 m
22	(Finland) Antti Aalto	180.5 m	163 m
23	(Russia) Roman Trofimov	188 m	212.5 m
24	(Japan) Naoki Nakamura	203.5 m	DNS
25	(Switzerland) Dominik Peter	DNS	DNS
26	(Austria) Clemens Leitner	171.5 m	186 m
27	(Estonia) Artti Aigro	180 m	201 m
28	(Russia) Mikhail Nazarov	160.5 m	202 m
29	(Austria) Michael Hayböck	234 m	241 m
30	(Canada) Mackenzie Boyd-Clowes	206 m	212 m
31	(Austria) Philipp Aschenwald	205.5 m	215 m
32	(Norway) Daniel-André Tande	232 m	234 m
33	(Slovenia) Peter Prevc	212.5 m	205.5 m
34	(Poland) Andrzej Stękała	209.5 m	219 m
35	(Norway) Anders Håre	194.5 m	200 m
36	(Japan) Junshirō Kobayashi	200 m	212.5 m
37	(Poland) Klemens Murańka	208 m	213.5 m
38	(Russia) Evgeniy Klimov	215 m	197.5 m
39	(Slovenia) Timi Zajc	218 m	214 m
40	(Slovenia) Žiga Jelar	197.5 m	206 m
41	(Poland) Aleksander Zniszczoł	210 m	212 m
42	(Norway) Sander Vossan Eriksen	218 m	208 m
43	(Germany) Severin Freund	206.5 m	208 m
44	(Japan) Ryōyū Kobayashi	205.5	213.5 m
45	(Poland) Kamil Stoch	229.5 m	232.5 m
46	(Germany) Martin Hamann	222 m	224.5 m
47	(Germany) Constantin Schmid	217 m	226 m
48	(Norway) Marius Lindvik	DNS	DNS
49	(Switzerland) Gregor Deschwanden	DNS	DNS
50	(Japan) Keiichi Satō	200 m	213.5 m
51	(Norway) Johann André Forfang	208 m	218 m
52	(Slovenia) Bor Pavlovčič	211 m	226 m
53	(Slovenia) Anže Lanišek	215 m	221.5 m
54	(Germany) Pius Paschke	200 m	220 m
55	(Poland) Piotr Żyła	213 m	228 m
56	(Germany) Karl Geiger	215 m	208.5 m
57	(Poland) Dawid Kubacki	212 m	202 m
58	(Japan) Yukiya Satō	194 m	208.5 m
59	(Norway) Robert Johansson	222 m	212.5 m
60	(Germany) Markus Eisenbichler	232 m	236 m
61	(Norway) Halvor Egner Granerud	231.5 m	223 m

== Medal summary ==
=== Medals table ===
* Host nation (Slovenia)

Rank	Nation	Gold	Silver	Bronze	Total
1	Germany	1	1	1	3
2	Norway	1	1	0	2
3	Poland	0	0	1	1
Totals (3 entries)		2	2	2	6

=== Medalists ===
Event	Gold		Silver		Bronze	
Individual	Karl Geiger; Germany	877.2	Halvor Egner Granerud; Norway	876.7	Markus Eisenbichler; Germany	859.3
Team	Norway; Daniel Andre Tande; Johann André Forfang; Robert Johansson; Halvor Egner Granerud	1,727.7	Germany; Constantin Schmid; Pius Paschke; Markus Eisenbichler; Karl Geiger	1,708.5	Poland; Piotr Żyła; Andrzej Stękała; Kamil Stoch; Dawid Kubacki	1,665.5
