= Andrzej Stękała =

Polish ski jumper

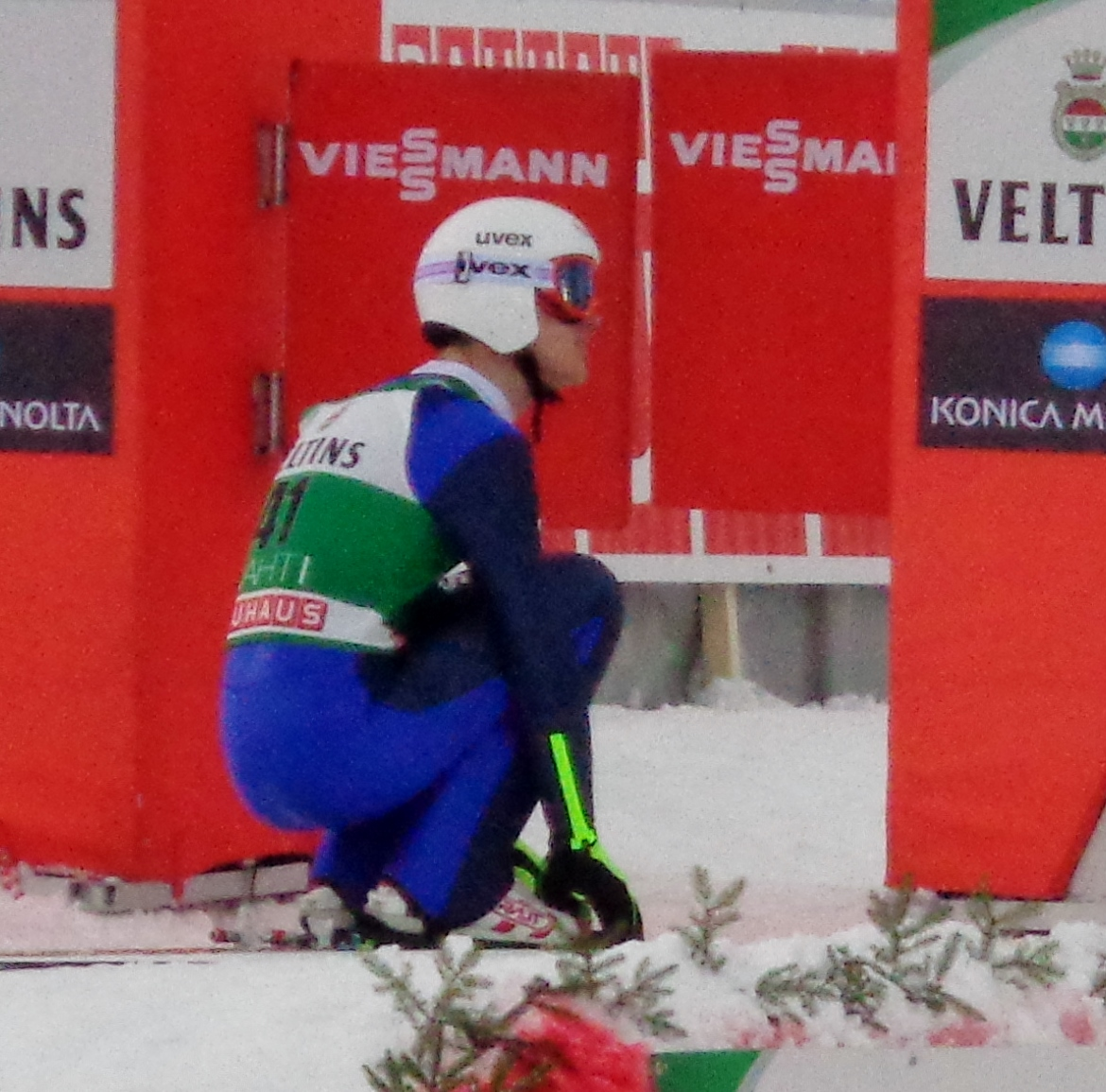
- Andrzej Stękała (2016)

Personal information
- Nationality: Poland
- Born: 30 June 1995 (age 31) Zakopane, Poland
- Height: 1.78 m (5 ft 10 in)

Sport
- Sport: Skiing
- Club: AZS Zakopane

World Cup career
- Seasons: 2015–present
- Indiv. starts: 43
- Indiv. podiums: 1
- Team starts: 1
- Team podiums: 3

Achievements and titles
- Personal bests: 235 m (771 ft); Vikersund, 14 February 2016
Medal record
World Championships
Bronze medal – third place	2021 Oberstdorf	Team LH
Men's ski flying
Ski Flying World Championships
Bronze medal – third place	2020 Planica	Team
- Updated on 6 March 2021

Andrzej Stękała ([ˈandʐɛj stɛŋˈkawa]; born 30 June 1995) is a Polish ski jumper, a member of the Polish national team and bronze medalist of the Ski Flying World Championships (2020) in team.

== Career ==
Stękała's World Cup debut took place in Engelberg in 2015. His best result so far is third place with the Polish team at a team event in Zakopane in 2016. On 12 February 2016, on Vikersundbakken, he improved his personal best to 168 m. The next day he made a new personal best – 198 m. On 14 February 2016, he improved his personal best in the qualification during the same weekend in Vikersund to 235 m, which is 16.5 m less than the Polish national record (the record 251.5 m belongs to Kamil Stoch).

On 29 January 2021, he won the first qualifications in his career after a 152-meter jump (one meter shorter than the then hill record) in Willingen.

== Personal life ==
On 1 January 2025, Stękała came out as gay, adding that he was in an eight-year relationship with a man who died in 2024.

== World Championships ==
Place	Day	Year	Locality	Hill	Point K	HS	Competition	Jump 1	Jump 2	Note (points)	Loss (points)	Winner
30.	27 February	2021	Oberstdorf	Schattenbergschanze	K-95	HS-106	individual	95.0 m	87.5 m	211.6	57.2	Piotr Żyła
21.	5 March	2021	Oberstdorf	Schattenbergschanze	K-120	HS-137	individual	121.5 m	122.5 m	219.2	57.3	Stefan Kraft
3.	6 March	2021	Oberstdorf	Schattenbergschanze	K-120	HS-137	team	122.5 m	127.0 m	1031.2 (232.4)	15.4	Germany

== Ski Flying World Championships ==
Place	Day	Year	Locality	Hill	Point K	HS	Competition	Jump 1	Jump 2	Jump 3	Jump 4	Note (points)	Loss (points)	Winner
10.	11–12 December	2020	Planica	Letalnica bratov Gorišek	K-200	HS-240	individual	224.5 m	215.5 m	224.5 m	212.0 m	792.4	84.8	Karl Geiger
3.	13 December	2020	Planica	Letalnica bratov Gorišek	K-200	HS-240	team	228.0 m		229.0 m		1665.5 (430.2)	62.2	Norway

== World Cup ==
=== Season standings ===
Season	Overall	Ski-Flying	Four Hills Tournament
2015–16	34	31	51
2020–21	16	17	6
2021–22	60	29	51

=== Individual starts ===
Season	1	2	3	4	5	6	7	8	9	10	11	12	13	14	15	16	17	18	19	20	21	22	23	24	25	26	27	28	29	30	31	Points
2015/16	Klingenthal HS140	Lillehammer HS100	Lillehammer HS100	Nizhny Tagil HS134	Nizhny Tagil HS134	Engelberg HS137	Engelberg HS137	Oberstdorf HS137	Garmisch-Partenkirchen HS140	Innsbruck HS130	Bischofshofen HS140	Willingen HS145	Zakopane HS134	Sapporo HS134	Sapporo HS134	Trondheim HS140	Vikersund HS225	Vikersund HS225	Vikersund HS225	Lahti HS130	Lahti HS100	Kuopio HS127	Almaty HS140	Almaty HS140	Wisła HS134	Titisee-Neustadt HS142	Planica HS225	Planica HS225	Planica HS225			105
2015/16	–	–	–	–	–	27	38	–	–	q	30	28	17	32	22	6	53	24	26	21	q	41	38	28	32	29	30	25	–			105
2018/19	Wisła HS134	Kuusamo HS142	Kuusamo HS142	Nizhny Tagil HS134	Nizhny Tagil HS134	Engelberg HS140	Engelberg HS140	Oberstdorf HS137	Garmisch-Partenkirchen HS142	Innsbruck HS130	Bischofshofen HS142	Predazzo HS135	Predazzo HS135	Zakopane HS140	Sapporo HS137	Sapporo HS137	Oberstdorf HS235	Oberstdorf HS235	Oberstdorf HS235	Lahti HS130	Willingen HS145	Willingen HS145	Oslo HS134	Lillehammer HS140	Trondheim HS138	Vikersund HS240	Planica HS240	Planica HS240				0
2018/19	q	—	—	—	—	—	—	—	—	—	—	—	—	—	—	—	—	—	—	—	—	—	—	—	—	—	—	—				0
2019/20	Wisła HS134	Kuusamo HS142	Nizhny Tagil HS134	Nizhny Tagil HS134	Klingenthal HS140	Engelberg HS140	Engelberg HS140	Oberstdorf HS137	Garmisch-Partenkirchen HS142	Innsbruck HS130	Bischofshofen HS142	Predazzo HS104	Predazzo HS104	Titisee-Neustadt HS142	Titisee-Neustadt HS142	Zakopane HS140	Sapporo HS137	Sapporo HS137	Willingen HS145	Tauplitz HS235	Tauplitz HS235	Râșnov HS97	Râșnov HS97	Lahti HS130	Lahti HS130	Lillehammer HS140	Lillehammer HS140					0
2019/20	q	—	—	—	—	—	—	—	—	—	—	—	—	—	—	q	45	q	46	35	q	—	—	—	—	—	—					0
2020/21	Wisła HS134	Kuusamo HS142	Kuusamo HS142	Nizhny Tagil HS134	Nizhny Tagil HS134	Engelberg HS140	Engelberg HS140	Oberstdorf HS137	Garmisch-Partenkirchen HS142	Innsbruck HS130	Bischofshofen HS142	Titisee-Neustadt HS142	Titisee-Neustadt HS142	Zakopane HS140	Lahti HS130	Willingen HS145	Willingen HS145	Klingenthal HS140	Klingenthal HS140	Zakopane HS140	Zakopane HS140	Râșnov HS97	Planica HS240	Planica HS240	Planica HS240							473
2020/21	19	11	33	–	–	7	15	7	10	18	8	5	21	5	15	20	21	21	18	2	–	22	18	36	15							473
