= Yukiya Sato =

Japanese ski jumper (born 1995)

Yukiya Satō
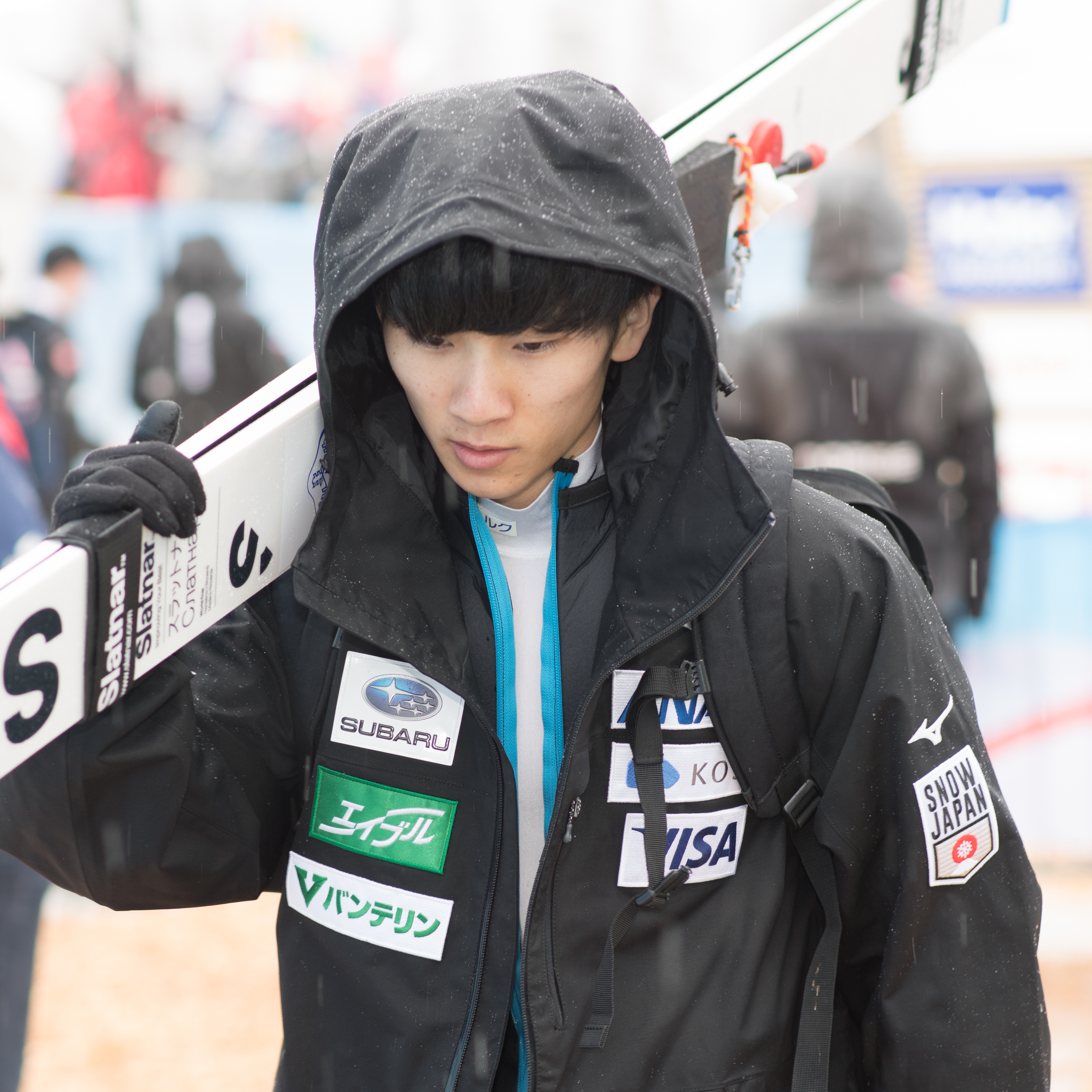
- Satō in 2019

Personal information
- Nationality: Japan
- Born: 19 June 1995 (age 31) Ishikari, Japan
- Height: 1.61 m (5 ft 3 in)

Sport
- Sport: Ski jumping
- Club: Megmilk Snow Brand Ski Team

World Cup career
- Seasons: 2015–present
- Indiv. starts: 165
- Indiv. podiums: 4
- Indiv. wins: 2
- Team starts: 28
- Team podiums: 6

Achievements and titles
- Personal bests: 242.5 m (796 ft); Planica, 27 March 2022
Medal record
Men's ski jumping
Representing Japan
World Championships
Bronze medal – third place	2019 Seefeld	Team LH
- Updated on 29 March 2026

Yukiya Satō (佐藤 幸椰, Satō Yukiya; born 19 June 1995) is a Japanese ski jumper.

He participated at the FIS Nordic World Ski Championships 2019, winning a medal.

After multiple strong World Cup seasons, his performance in the 2022-23 season dropped dramatically. During this season, he failed to qualify for more than 10 World Cup events.

The following season (2023-24) he only participated in a few COC competitions, aside from local and national competitions.

His performance got better and better as the 2024-25 season began. After a strong performance in multiple COC competitions, he earned a return to the World Cup stage through the COC quota. Here, he managed to score World Cup points for the first time in almost two years. He was selected for the Japan Ski Jumping squad to participate in the FIS Nordic World Ski Championships 2025 in Trondheim.

== Major Tournament results ==
=== Winter Olympics ===
Year	Place	Individual		Team	
Year	Place	Normal	Large	Men	Mixed
2018	(South Korea) Pyeongchang	did not participate			
2022	(China) Beijing	32	15	5	4
2026	(Italy) Milano Cortina	did not participate			

=== FIS World Nordic Ski Championships ===
Year	Place	NH	LH	Team LH	Mixed NH
2019	(Austria) Seefeld	7	21	3rd place, bronze medalist(s)	5
2021	(Germany) Oberstdorf	16	7	4	5
2023	(Slovenia) Planica	did not participate			
2025	(Norway) Trondheim	—	26	5	—

=== Ski Flying World Championships ===
Year	Place	Individual	Team
2018	(Germany) Oberstdorf	did not participate	
2020	(Slovenia) Planica	6	5
2022	(Norway) Vikersund	9	6
2024	(Austria) Bad Mitterndorf	did not participate	
2026	(Germany) Oberstdorf	did not participate	

== World Cup results ==
=== Standings ===
Season	Overall	4H	SF	RA	W6	T5	P7
2014/15	—	—	—	N/A	N/A	N/A	N/A
2015/16	—	—	—	N/A	N/A	N/A	N/A
2016/17	—	—	—	—	N/A	N/A	N/A
2017/18	45	—	39	21	23	N/A	31
2018/19	22	12	15	13	32	N/A	20
2019/20	13	19	32	10	10	13	N/A
2020/21	11	14	8	N/A	26	N/A	7
2021/22	13	10	8	20	N/A	N/A	7
2022/23	54	50	38	46	N/A	N/A	65
2023/24	did not participate						
2024/25	44	—	27	28	N/A	N/A	34
2025/26	34	34	37	N/A	N/A	N/A	43

=== Wins ===
No.	Season	Date	Location	Hill	Size
1	2019/20	8 December 2019	(Russia) Nizhny Tagil	Tramplin Stork HS134 (night)	LH
2	2019/20	1 February 2020	(Japan) Sapporo	Ōkurayama HS137 (night)	LH

=== Individual starts (165) ===
winner (1); second (2); third (3); did not compete (–); failed to qualify (q); disqualified (DQ); did not start (DNS)
Season	1	2	3	4	5	6	7	8	9	10	11	12	13	14	15	16	17	18	19	20	21	22	23	24	25	26	27	28	29	30	31	32	Points
2014/15	Klingenthal	Kuusamo	Kuusamo	Lillehammer	Lillehammer	Nizhny Tagil	Nizhny Tagil	Engelberg	Engelberg	Oberstdorf	Garmisch-Partenkirchen	Innsbruck	Bischofshofen	Tauplitz	Wisła	Zakopane	Sapporo	Sapporo	Willingen	Willingen	Titisee-Neustadt	Titisee-Neustadt	Vikersund	Vikersund	Lahti	Kuopio	Trondheim	Oslo	Oslo	Planica	Planica		0
2014/15	–	–	–	–	–	–	–	–	–	–	–	–	–	–	–	–	39	43	–	–	–	–	–	–	–	–	–	–	–	–	–		0
2015/16	Klingenthal	Lillehammer	Lillehammer	Nizhny Tagil	Nizhny Tagil	Engelberg	Engelberg	Oberstdorf	Garmisch-Partenkirchen	Innsbruck	Bischofshofen	Willingen	Zakopane	Sapporo	Sapporo	Trondheim	Vikersund	Vikersund	Vikersund	Lahti	Lahti	Kuopio	Almaty	Almaty	Wisła	Titisee-Neustadt	Planica	Planica	Planica				0
2015/16	–	–	–	–	39	–	–	–	–	–	–	–	–	43	31	–	–	–	–	–	–	–	–	–	–	–	–						0
2016/17	Kuusamo	Kuusamo	Klingenthal	Lillehammer	Lillehammer	Engelberg	Engelberg	Oberstdorf	Garmisch-Partenkirchen	Innsbruck	Bischofshofen	Wisła	Wisła	Zakopane	Willingen	Oberstdorf	Oberstdorf	Sapporo	Sapporo	Pyeongchang	Pyeongchang	Oslo	Trondheim	Vikersund	Planica	Planica							0
2016/17	–	–	–	–	–	–	–	–	–	–	–	–	–	–	–	–	–	36	–	–	–	–	–	–	–	–							0
2017/18	Wisła	Kuusamo	Nizhny Tagil	Nizhny Tagil	Titisee-Neustadt	Engelberg	Engelberg	Oberstdorf	Garmisch-Partenkirchen	Innsbruck	Bischofshofen	Tauplitz	Zakopane	Willingen	Willingen	Lahti	Oslo	Lillehammer	Trondheim	Vikersund	Planica	Planica											41
2017/18	–	–	DQ	–	–	–	–	–	–	–	–	–	–	29	11	34	27	DQ	37	20	33	–											41
2018/19	Wisła	Kuusamo	Kuusamo	Nizhny Tagil	Nizhny Tagil	Engelberg	Engelberg	Oberstdorf	Garmisch-Partenkirchen	Innsbruck	Bischofshofen	Val di Fiemme	Val di Fiemme	Zakopane	Sapporo	Sapporo	Oberstdorf	Oberstdorf	Oberstdorf	Lahti	Willingen	Willingen	Oslo	Lillehammer	Trondheim	Vikersund	Planica	Planica					316
2018/19	–	–	–	–	–	18	32	15	17	6	23	16	20	3	20	28	34	10	19	40	30	35	8	27	22	15	24	14					316
2019/20	Wisła	Kuusamo	Nizhny Tagil	Nizhny Tagil	Klingenthal	Engelberg	Engelberg	Oberstdorf	Garmisch-Partenkirchen	Innsbruck	Bischofshofen	Val di Fiemme	Val di Fiemme	Titisee-Neustadt	Titisee-Neustadt	Zakopane	Sapporo	Sapporo	Willingen	Tauplitz	Tauplitz	Râșnov	Râșnov	Lahti	Lahti	Oslo	Lillehammer						559
2019/20	17	32	1	11	6	–	–	7	27	46	12	11	10	18	7	22	1	16	11	27	DQ	–	–	21	14	12	14						559
2020/21	Wisła	Ruka	Ruka	Nizhny Tagil	Nizhny Tagil	Engelberg	Engelberg	Oberstdorf	Garmisch-Partenkirchen	Innsbruck	Bischofshofen	Titisee-Neustadt	Titisee-Neustadt	Zakopane	Lahti	Willingen	Willingen	Klingenthal	Klingenthal	Zakopane	Zakopane	Râșnov	Planica	Planica	Planica								581
2020/21	7	5	4	8	30	31	9	18	30	5	9	18	8	7	18	27	45	10	5	12	32	33	9	6	6								581
2021/22	Nizhny Tagil	Nizhny Tagil	Ruka	Ruka	Wisła	Klingenthal	Klingenthal	Engelberg	Engelberg	Oberstdorf	Garmisch-Partenkirchen	Bischofshofen	Bischofshofen	Bischofshofen	Zakopane	Titisee-Neustadt	Titisee-Neustadt	Willingen	Willingen	Lahti	Lahti	Lillehammer	Oslo	Oslo	Oberstdorf	Oberstdorf	Planica	Planica					530
2021/22	10	14	10	49	19	26	27	22	q	16	6	10	4	9	15	13	18	5	30	43	20	29	30	21	16	11	8	2					530
2022/23	Wisła	Wisła	Ruka	Ruka	Titisee-Neustadt	Titisee-Neustadt	Engelberg	Engelberg	Oberstdorf	Garmisch-Partenkirchen	Innsbruck	Bischofshofen	Zakopane	Sapporo	Sapporo	Sapporo	Tauplitz	Tauplitz	Willingen	Willingen	Lake Placid	Lake Placid	Râșnov	Oslo	Oslo	Lillehammer	Lillehammer	Vikersund	Vikersund	Lahti	Planica	Planica	21
2022/23	32	38	40	19	46	q	35	43	45	43	39	DQ	–	q	q	44	23	30	q	q	42	q	–	45	48	45	q	q	q	q	q	–	21
2024/25	Lillehammer	Lillehammer	Ruka	Ruka	Wisła	Wisła	Titisee-Neustadt	Titisee-Neustadt	Engelberg	Engelberg	Oberstdorf	Garmisch-Partenkirchen	Innsbruck	Bischofshofen	Zakopane	Oberstdorf	Oberstdorf	Willingen	Willingen	Lake Placid	Lake Placid	Sapporo	Sapporo	Oslo	Vikersund	Vikersund	Lahti	Planica	Planica				69
2024/25	–	–	–	–	–	–	–	–	–	–	–	–	–	–	–	–	–	q	19	35	43	40	22	45	30	9	20	24	–				69
2025/26	Lillehammer	Lillehammer	Falun	Falun	Ruka	Wisła	Wisła	Klingenthal	Klingenthal	Engelberg	Engelberg	Oberstdorf	Garmisch-Partenkirchen	Innsbruck	Bischofshofen	Zakopane	Sapporo	Sapporo	Willingen	Willingen	Bad Mitterndorf	Bad Mitterndorf	Lahti	Lahti	Oslo	Oslo	Vikersund	Planica	Planica				148
2025/26	32	41	29	27	17	49	23	26	27	23	21	–	25	25	DNS	47	16	24	12	25	24	q	17	q	21	31	q	35	–				148
