= Philipp Aschenwald =

Austrian ski jumper (born 1995)

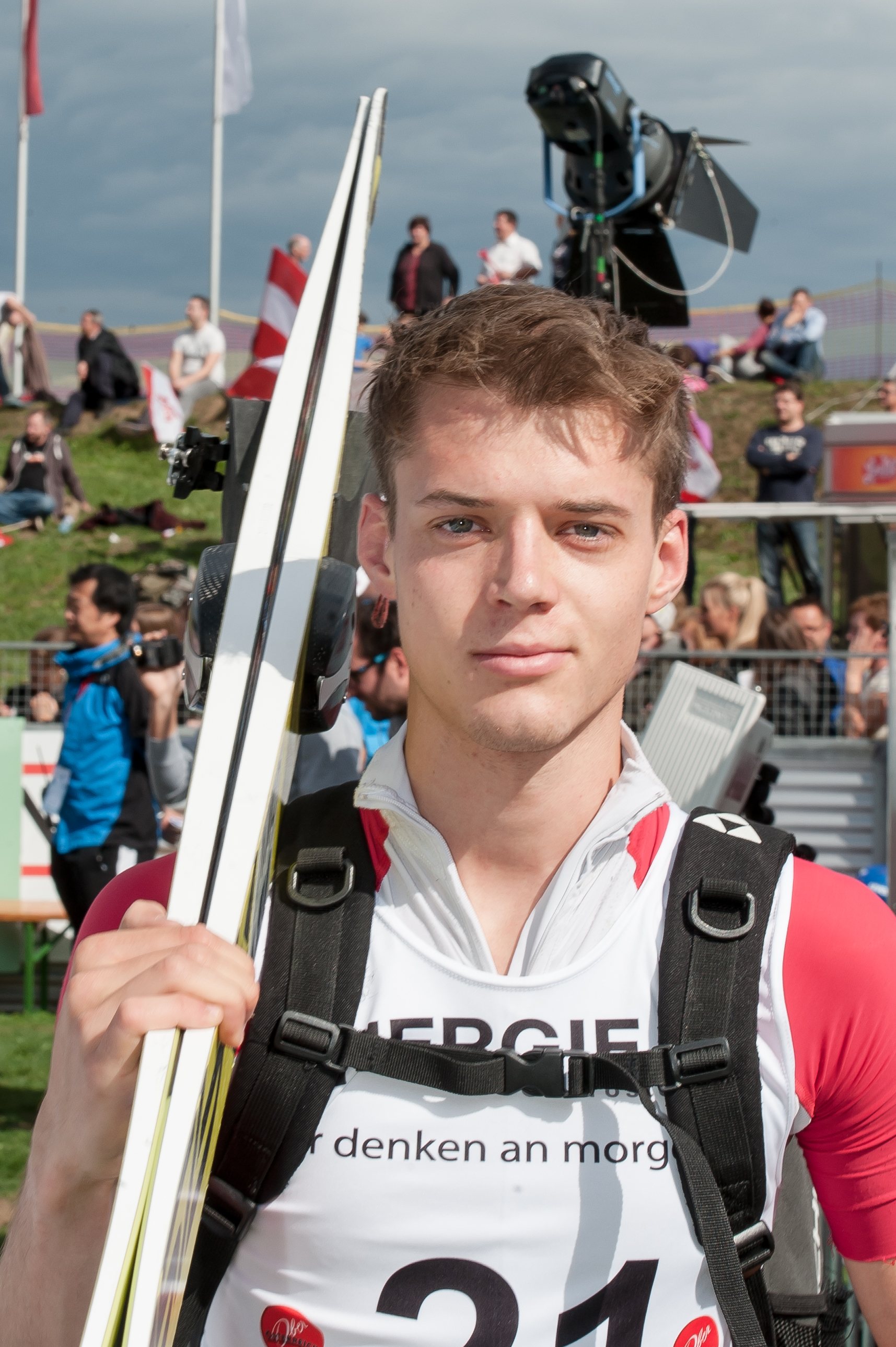

Personal information
- Nationality: Austria
- Born: 12 November 1995 (age 30) Ramsau im Zillertal, Austria
- Height: 1.78 m (5 ft 10 in)

Sport
- Sport: Skiing
- Club: SC Mayerhofen-Tirol

World Cup career
- Seasons: 2016–present
- Indiv. podiums: 2
- Team podiums: 9
- Team wins: 5

Achievements and titles
- Personal best: 221,5 m
Medal record
Men's ski jumping
Representing Austria
World Championships
Silver medal – second place	2019 Seefeld	Team LH
Silver medal – second place	2019 Seefeld	Mixed team NH
Silver medal – second place	2021 Oberstdorf	Team LH
Junior World Championships
Bronze medal – third place	2015 Almaty	Team NH

Philipp Aschenwald (born 12 November 1995) is an Austrian ski jumper.

He participated at the FIS Nordic World Ski Championships 2019, winning a medal.
