= FIS Ski Flying World Championships 2022 – Individual =

Individual at the FIS Ski Flying World Championships 2022
- Venue: Vikersundbakken HS240
- Location: Vikersund, Norway
- Dates: 10 March (qualification); 11–12 March
- Competitors: 45 from 16 nations
- Winning points: 854.2

Medalists
gold medal	Marius Lindvik	Norway
silver medal	Timi Zajc	Slovenia
bronze medal	Stefan Kraft	Austria

The Individual competition at the FIS Ski Flying World Championships 2022 was held on 11 and 12 March 2022, with the qualification being held on 10 March.

== Qualification ==
Qualification was held on 10 March 2022 at 15:50.

Rank	Bib	Name	Country	Distance (m)	Points	Notes
1	50	Stefan Kraft	Austria	230.0	217.9	Q
2	22	Michael Hayböck	Austria	233.0	210.5	Q
3	49	Anže Lanišek	Slovenia	221.0	207.3	Q
4	14	Domen Prevc	Slovenia	225.5	206.1	Q
5	52	Marius Lindvik	Norway	228.0	204.6	Q
6	54	Karl Geiger	Germany	221.5	200.9	Q
7	32	Johann André Forfang	Norway	217.5	200.2	Q
8	35	Constantin Schmid	Germany	217.0	197.1	Q
9	55	Ryōyū Kobayashi	Japan	213.0	193.2	Q
10	31	Andreas Wellinger	Germany	211.5	190.2	Q
11	44	Timi Zajc	Slovenia	215.0	188.0	Q
11	42	Yukiya Satō	Japan	209.0	188.0	Q
13	51	Markus Eisenbichler	Germany	215.5	187.2	Q
14	18	Jakub Wolny	Poland	211.5	186.2	Q
15	36	Piotr Żyła	Poland	211.5	185.5	Q
16	34	Peter Prevc	Slovenia	206.5	184.8	Q
17	46	Robert Johansson	Norway	203.0	181.7	Q
18	17	Antti Aalto	Finland	208.0	180.4	Q
19	19	Niko Kytösaho	Finland	207.0	178.2	Q
20	28	Severin Freund	Germany	206.5	178.0	Q
21	15	Artti Aigro	Estonia	204.0	177.2	Q
22	39	Daniel-André Tande	Norway	203.5	176.9	Q
23	37	Kamil Stoch	Poland	202.5	176.4	Q
24	13	Giovanni Bresadola	Italy	202.0	176.1	Q
25	16	Eetu Nousiainen	Finland	204.5	175.5	Q
26	23	Simon Ammann	Switzerland	207.5	174.4	Q
27	40	Manuel Fettner	Austria	201.0	174.2	Q
28	33	Gregor Deschwanden	Switzerland	195.0	167.4	Q
29	30	Naoki Nakamura	Japan	197.0	167.3	Q
30	24	Paweł Wąsek	Poland	197.0	165.3	Q
31	4	Alex Insam	Italy	189.5	157.2	Q
32	29	Junshirō Kobayashi	Japan	181.5	147.2	Q
33	8	Casey Larson	United States	181.0	144.2	Q
34	3	Sabirzhan Muminov	Kazakhstan	178.0	141.7	Q
35	6	Kevin Maltsev	Estonia	178.0	140.5	Q
36	43	Killian Peier	Switzerland	172.5	139.3	Q
37	20	Vladimir Zografski	Bulgaria	178.0	138.1	Q
38	11	Fatih Arda İpcioğlu	Turkey	170.5	132.6	Q
39	45	Daniel Huber	Austria	165.0	129.3	Q
40	5	Matthew Soukup	Canada	158.0	116.0	Q
41	1	Kalle Heikkinen	Finland	159.0	115.9	
42	2	Muhammed Ali Bedir	Turkey	154.0	112.4	
43	7	Čestmír Kožíšek	Czech Republic	155.5	109.3	
44	10	Danil Vassilyev	Kazakhstan	157.5 PB	108.3	
45	9	Muhammet İrfan Çintımar	Turkey	139.0	88.3	

== Results ==
The first two rounds were held on 11 March at 16:30 and the final rounds on 12 March at 16:30.

Rank	Bib	Name	Country	Round 1			Round 2			Round 3			Final round			Total
Rank	Bib	Name	Country	Distance (m)	Points	Rank	Distance (m)	Points	Rank	Distance (m)	Points	Rank	Distance (m)	Points	Rank	Points
1st place, gold medalist(s)	38	Marius Lindvik	Norway	232.5	227.4	1	226.5	230.1	2	230.0	200.4	1	224.5	196.3	3	854.2
2nd place, silver medalist(s)	32	Timi Zajc	Slovenia	242.5	220.0	3	218.0	216.5	4	243.5	193.4	4	235.5	214.4	1	844.3
3rd place, bronze medalist(s)	36	Stefan Kraft	Austria	225.5	217.9	6	230.0	233.1	1	227.0	196.7	3	213.0	189.8	8	837.5
4	24	Peter Prevc	Slovenia	236.0	219.0	5	207.5	200.6	12	237.0	198.1	2	223.0	190.5	7	808.2
5	35	Anže Lanišek	Slovenia	230.0	220.1	2	211.5	206.5	6	221.0	177.4	11	231.0	202.1	2	806.1
6	8	Domen Prevc	Slovenia	231.5	215.0	7	222.5	222.6	3	222.5	188.5	6	216.0	176.1	18	802.2
7	15	Michael Hayböck	Austria	227.5	208.3	8	209.0	201.2	11	217.0	178.4	10	227.0	193.0	4	780.9
8	39	Karl Geiger	Germany	209.0	195.9	11	199.0	194.0	18	234.5	192.6	5	220.5	186.7	11	769.2
9	30	Yukiya Satō	Japan	225.5	199.8	10	210.5	202.9	10	221.0	178.9	9	218.0	182.6	14	764.2
10	22	Johann André Forfang	Norway	223.0	201.7	9	212.0	206.1	7	208.5	165.6	16	216.0	181.7	16	755.1
11	12	Jakub Wolny	Poland	219.0	194.3	13	197.0	199.7	14	213.5	165.6	16	221.5	186.0	12	745.6
12	18	Severin Freund	Germany	206.5	181.2	17	209.0	204.1	8	213.0	165.8	15	221.5	192.4	5	743.5
13	40	Ryōyū Kobayashi	Japan	204.5	193.9	14	208.5	208.9	5	195.5	146.7	26	218.5	188.4	9	737.9
14	21	Andreas Wellinger	Germany	216.5	195.5	12	187.5	187.5	23	193.0	156.5	20	219.5	191.9	6	731.4
15	26	Piotr Żyła	Poland	215.0	191.3	15	187.0	183.1	25	225.0	184.2	8	209.5	167.1	19	725.7
16	29	Manuel Fettner	Austria	216.5	190.5	16	197.5	191.7	19	193.5	152.7	22	213.0	184.2	13	719.1
17	25	Constantin Schmid	Germany	206.0	180.6	18	206.0	203.5	9	197.0	148.3	24	213.5	182.0	15	714.4
18	37	Markus Eisenbichler	Germany	185.0	165.4	24	204.5	196.5	16	213.5	170.2	13	206.0	177.9	17	710.0
19	9	Artti Aigro	Estonia	207.0	177.7	20	208.0	197.9	15	208.5	167.6	14	201.5	166.7	21	709.9
20	28	Daniel-André Tande	Norway	197.5	167.1	23	201.5	188.5	20	207.5	162.8	18	215.0	188.2	10	706.6
21	7	Giovanni Bresadola	Italy	207.0	177.3	21	204.0	196.5	16	218.0	175.3	12	187.5	150.2	26	699.3
22	27	Kamil Stoch	Poland	206.5	179.1	19	196.0	186.9	24	223.5	185.2	7	175.5	128.4	28	679.6
23	16	Simon Ammann	Switzerland	197.0	164.7	25	196.0	182.6	26	196.5	147.0	25	201.0	166.3	22	660.6
24	23	Gregor Deschwanden	Switzerland	185.5	152.8	30	201.0	188.4	21	200.0	153.9	21	199.5	164.6	23	659.7
25	17	Paweł Wąsek	Poland	196.0	164.7	25	181.5	164.7	29	208.5	160.4	19	200.0	167.0	20	656.8
26	10	Eetu Nousiainen	Finland	204.5	174.6	22	173.5	157.6	30	191.5	145.5	27	190.5	154.6	24	632.3
27	13	Niko Kytösaho	Finland	192.5	157.8	28	199.0	187.9	22	162.0	104.8	29	191.5	154.5	25	605.0
28	11	Antti Aalto	Finland	194.0	159.5	27	186.0	171.4	28	200.0	149.8	23	160.0	121.9	29	602.6
29	2	Alex Insam	Italy	188.0	153.3	29	185.5	172.8	27	172.5	112.0	28	181.0	143.8	27	581.9
30	34	Robert Johansson	Norway	231.0	219.9	4	206.0	200.5	13	Did not start						
—	31	Killian Peier	Switzerland	180.0	145.6	31	Did not advance									
—	4	Kevin Maltsev	Estonia	176.0	141.4	32	Did not advance									
—	19	Junshirō Kobayashi	Japan	175.0	137.5	33	Did not advance									
—	14	Vladimir Zografski	Bulgaria	172.0	134.0	34	Did not advance									
—	6	Fatih Arda İpcioğlu	Turkey	165.5	131.5	35	Did not advance									
—	1	Sabirzhan Muminov	Kazakhstan	172.5	131.2	36	Did not advance									
—	20	Naoki Nakamura	Japan	166.0	123.4	37	Did not advance									
—	33	Daniel Huber	Austria	141.0	102.1	38	Did not advance									
—	3	Matthew Soukup	Canada	143.0	96.2	39	Did not advance									
—	5	Casey Larson	United States	139.5	92.5	40	Did not advance									
