= FIS Nordic World Ski Championships 2025 – Men's individual normal hill =

Men's individual normal hill at the FIS Nordic World Ski Championships 2025
- Venue: Granåsen Ski Centre
- Location: Trondheim, Norway
- Dates: 1 March (qualification); 2 March
- Competitors: 61 from 20 nations
- Winning points: 265.5

Medalists
gold medal	Marius Lindvik	Norway
silver medal	Andreas Wellinger	Germany
bronze medal	Jan Hörl	Austria

The Men's individual normal hill competition at the FIS Nordic World Ski Championships 2025 was held on 1 and 2 March 2025.

== Results ==
=== Qualification ===
The qualification was held on 1 March at 20:30.

Rank	Bib	Name	Country	Distance (m)	Points	Notes
1	58	Johann André Forfang	Norway	106.5	140.8	Q
2	53	Andreas Wellinger	Germany	105.5	138.2	Q
3	61	Daniel Tschofenig	Austria	102.5	134.2	Q
4	36	Killian Peier	Switzerland	104.0	131.9	Q
5	48	Karl Geiger	Germany	101.5	129.1	Q
6	39	Valentin Foubert	France	100.0	128.7	Q
7	59	Stefan Kraft	Austria	101.0	128.4	Q
8	60	Jan Hörl	Austria	100.0	127.3	Q
9	56	Gregor Deschwanden	Switzerland	99.5	125.8	Q
10	38	Philipp Raimund	Germany	100.0	124.9	Q
11	46	Domen Prevc	Slovenia	99.5	124.7	Q
12	20	Yanick Wasser	Switzerland	105.0	124.4	Q
12	52	Anže Lanišek	Slovenia	96.0	124.4	Q
14	50	Marius Lindvik	Norway	98.0	124.3	Q
15	47	Timi Zajc	Slovenia	100.5	124.1	Q
16	54	Maximilian Ortner	Austria	98.0	123.9	Q
17	49	Paweł Wąsek	Poland	98.5	123.2	Q
18	51	Ryōyū Kobayashi	Japan	95.5	123.1	Q
19	37	Vladimir Zografski	Bulgaria	97.0	122.4	Q
20	55	Kristoffer Eriksen Sundal	Norway	97.0	122.2	Q
21	42	Aleksander Zniszczoł	Poland	97.0	121.1	Q
22	34	Dawid Kubacki	Poland	98.5	120.5	Q
23	33	Lovro Kos	Slovenia	98.5	118.7	Q
24	32	Yevhen Marusiak	Ukraine	98.0	118.0	Q
25	28	Alex Insam	Italy	98.5	117.6	Q
26	14	Casey Larson	United States	99.0	116.3	Q
27	44	Tate Frantz	United States	95.5	114.7	Q
28	45	Ren Nikaido	Japan	94.5	114.6	Q
29	40	Naoki Nakamura	Japan	93.0	113.8	Q
30	57	Pius Paschke	Germany	92.0	113.6	Q
31	30	Robin Pedersen	Norway	94.5	113.4	Q
32	29	Antti Aalto	Finland	94.0	112.9	Q
33	23	Fatih Arda İpcioğlu	Turkey	96.5	112.5	Q
34	35	Jakub Wolny	Poland	96.5	111.8	Q
35	25	Erik Belshaw	United States	94.5	111.6	Q
36	27	Sakutaro Kobayashi	Japan	93.5	110.9	Q
37	31	Piotr Żyła	Poland	94.5	110.7	Q
38	26	Niko Kytösaho	Finland	94.5	108.5	Q
39	19	Kasperi Valto	Finland	99.5	107.3	Q
40	15	Enzo Milesi	France	96.0	106.9	Q
41	7	Francesco Cecon	Italy	96.5	106.6	Q
41	22	Ilya Mizernykh	Kazakhstan	95.0	106.6	Q
43	1	Vitaliy Kalinichenko	Ukraine	96.0	105.4	Q
44	41	Kevin Bickner	United States	90.0	105.0	Q
45	18	Simon Ammann	Switzerland	97.5	104.0	Q
46	17	Vilho Palosaari	Finland	94.0	103.4	Q
47	21	Roman Koudelka	Czech Republic	93.0	103.3	Q
48	43	Artti Aigro	Estonia	88.5	103.2	Q
49	16	Muhammed Ali Bedir	Turkey	92.5	100.9	Q
50	8	Kaimar Vagul	Estonia	93.5	100.5	Q
51	24	Danil Vassilyev	Kazakhstan	90.0	99.3	
52	4	Svyastoslav Nazarenko	Kazakhstan	90.0	92.3	
53	3	Zhen Weijie	China	92.0	92.1	
54	9	Song Qiwu	China	89.0	90.5	
55	2	David Rygl	Czech Republic	90.5	87.5	
56	5	Daniel Cacina	Romania	87.0	87.0	
57	10	Daniel Škarka	Czech Republic	86.0	85.0	
58	11	Hektor Kapustík	Slovakia	86.5	84.2	
59	12	Lyu Yixin	China	85.0	83.6	
60	13	Sabirzhan Muminov	Kazakhstan	83.0	82.2	
61	6	Zheng Pengbo	China	78.5	68.2	

=== Final ===
The first round was held on 2 March 2025 at 17:00 and the final round at 18:10.

Rank	Bib	Name	Country	Round 1			Final round			Total
Rank	Bib	Name	Country	Distance (m)	Points	Rank	Distance (m)	Points	Rank	Points
1st place, gold medalist(s)	39	Marius Lindvik	Norway	108.0	137.2	1	104.5	128.3	2	265.5
2nd place, silver medalist(s)	45	Andreas Wellinger	Germany	106.5	133.9	2	104.5	129.3	1	263.2
3rd place, bronze medalist(s)	49	Jan Hörl	Austria	107.0	132.6	3	102.0	123.7	5	256.3
4	37	Karl Geiger	Germany	105.5	131.3	5	102.0	121.3	7	252.6
5	47	Johann André Forfang	Norway	107.0	131.9	4	100.5	120.6	8	252.5
6	38	Stefan Kraft	Austria	106.0	130.1	6	101.0	120.3	9	250.4
7	40	Ryōyū Kobayashi	Japan	104.0	127.3	7	103.5	122.7	6	250.0
8	41	Anže Lanišek	Slovenia	100.0	121.1	10	104.0	127.0	3	248.1
9	26	Vladimir Zografski	Bulgaria	99.5	119.2	14	105.0	125.1	4	244.3
10	38	Paweł Wąsek	Poland	99.0	120.8	13	102.0	113.7	14	234.5
11	29	Naoki Nakamura	Japan	101.0	120.9	12	100.0	112.3	16	233.2
12	18	Antti Aalto	Finland	101.0	117.9	15	98.0	114.8	12	232.7
13	22	Lovro Kos	Slovenia	102.0	124.2	8	96.0	108.3	21	232.5
14	45	Gregor Deschwanden	Switzerland	102.5	121.7	9	99.5	110.3	18	232.0
15	27	Philipp Raimund	Germany	99.0	116.2	20	99.0	115.1	11	231.3
16	33	Tate Frantz	United States	97.0	112.7	26	99.0	116.2	10	228.9
17	19	Robin Pedersen	Norway	101.5	114.5	24	99.5	114.4	13	228.9
18	35	Domen Prevc	Slovenia	100.0	117.4	17	96.0	109.7	19	227.1
19	23	Dawid Kubacki	Poland	100.0	115.4	22	95.5	111.4	17	226.8
20	20	Piotr Żyła	Poland	104.5	116.5	18	96.5	109.0	20	225.5
21	50	Daniel Tschofenig	Austria	97.0	112.2	28	96.5	112.4	15	224.6
22	34	Ren Nikaido	Japan	99.5	117.9	15	96.5	105.9	25	223.8
23	43	Maximilian Ortner	Austria	99.0	116.2	20	94.5	106.9	24	223.1
24	32	Artti Aigro	Estonia	98.0	112.4	27	95.0	107.7	22	220.1
25	14	Erik Belshaw	United States	100.0	112.0	29	95.5	107.7	22	219.7
26	9	Kasperi Valto	Finland	101.5	113.8	25	96.5	104.9	16	218.7
27	23	Valentin Foubert	France	99.0	116.3	19	90.0	99.0	27	215.3
28	31	Aleksander Zniszczoł	Poland	100.0	121.0	11	87.0	90.9	30	211.9
29	24	Jakub Wolny	Poland	101.0	114.7	23	88.5	94.9	28	209.6
30	46	Pius Paschke	Germany	96.5	110.1	30	89.0	93.3	29	203.4
31	21	Yevhen Marusiak	Ukraine	97.5	108.2	31	Did not qualify			
32	30	Kevin Bickner	United States	96.0	107.5	32	Did not qualify			
33	44	Kristoffer Eriksen Sundal	Norway	93.5	107.0	33	Did not qualify			
34	11	Roman Koudelka	Czech Republic	96.5	106.8	34	Did not qualify			
35	5	Enzo Milesi	France	95.0	105.9	35	Did not qualify			
36	10	Yanick Wasser	Switzerland	97.0	105.0	36	Did not qualify			
37	36	Timi Zajc	Slovenia	93.0	103.7	37	Did not qualify			
38	17	Alex Insam	Italy	94.5	103.5	38	Did not qualify			
39	13	Fatih Arda İpcioğlu	Turkey	95.0	101.1	39	Did not qualify			
40	4	Casey Larson	United States	93.0	101.0	40	Did not qualify			
41	30	Killian Peier	Switzerland	91.5	100.4	41	Did not qualify			
42	8	Simon Ammann	Switzerland	92.5	99.0	42	Did not qualify			
43	1	Vitaliy Kalinichenko	Ukraine	92.5	97.2	43	Did not qualify			
44	2	Francesco Cecon	Italy	91.0	90.8	44	Did not qualify			
45	3	Kaimar Vagul	Estonia	90.0	90.2	45	Did not qualify			
46	15	Niko Kytösaho	Finland	90.0	89.0	46	Did not qualify			
47	12	Ilya Mizernykh	Kazakhstan	86.5	85.6	47	Did not qualify			
48	6	Muhammed Ali Bedir	Turkey	83.5	74.1	48	Did not qualify			
49	16	Sakutaro Kobayashi	Japan	Disqualified			Did not qualify			
50	7	Vilho Palosaari	Finland	Not permitted to start			Did not qualify			
