= FIS Nordic World Ski Championships 2023 – Men's individual normal hill =

Men's individual normal hill at the FIS Nordic World Ski Championships 2023
- Venue: Srednja skakalnica (HS102)
- Location: Planica, Slovenia
- Dates: 24 February (qualification); 25 February
- Competitors: 50 from 18 nations
- Winning points: 261.8

Medalists
gold medal	Piotr Żyła	Poland
silver medal	Andreas Wellinger	Germany
bronze medal	Karl Geiger	Germany

The Men's individual normal hill competition at the FIS Nordic World Ski Championships 2023 was held on 24 and 25 February 2023.

== Qualification ==
The qualification was held on 24 February 2023.

Rank	Bib	Name	Country	Distance (m)	Points	Notes
1	60	Anže Lanišek	Slovenia	98.0	141.6	Q
2	59	Stefan Kraft	Austria	97.5	137.4	Q
3	55	Timi Zajc	Slovenia	99.0	137.1	Q
4	54	Karl Geiger	Germany	98.0	136.5	Q
5	56	Ryōyū Kobayashi	Japan	101.0	135.7	Q
6	62	Halvor Egner Granerud	Norway	95.5	134.1	Q
7	53	Daniel Tschofenig	Austria	98.5	132.8	Q
8	61	Dawid Kubacki	Poland	95.0	131.7	Q
9	57	Andreas Wellinger	Germany	97.0	130.7	Q
10	58	Piotr Żyła	Poland	95.5	129.4	Q
11	50	Kamil Stoch	Poland	99.5	128.7	Q
12	44	Constantin Schmid	Germany	98.0	127.4	Q
13	30	Simon Ammann	Switzerland	99.5	126.6	Q
14	52	Michael Hayböck	Austria	97.0	126.2	Q
15	40	Paweł Wąsek	Poland	95.5	125.6	Q
16	51	Jan Hörl	Austria	96.0	124.3	Q
17	31	Artti Aigro	Estonia	97.0	124.2	Q
18	29	Fatih Arda İpcioğlu	Turkey	97.0	123.7	Q
19	36	Vladimir Zografski	Bulgaria	97.5	122.5	Q
20	35	Niko Kytösaho	Finland	97.5	122.2	Q
20	46	Johann André Forfang	Norway	94.0	122.2	Q
22	41	Gregor Deschwanden	Switzerland	96.0	121.8	Q
23	38	Aleksander Zniszczoł	Poland	95.0	121.7	Q
24	34	Ren Nikaido	Japan	95.0	121.0	Q
25	49	Markus Eisenbichler	Germany	95.0	120.8	Q
26	43	Naoki Nakamura	Japan	96.5	120.5	Q
27	37	Antti Aalto	Finland	96.0	120.3	Q
28	27	Casey Larson	United States	94.0	119.9	Q
29	32	Mackenzie Boyd-Clowes	Canada	95.5	119.4	Q
30	25	Erik Belshaw	United States	93.0	119.1	Q
31	21	Killian Peier	Switzerland	92.5	118.9	Q
32	39	Kristoffer Eriksen Sundal	Norway	92.5	118.8	Q
33	48	Žiga Jelar	Slovenia	96.0	118.5	Q
34	45	Lovro Kos	Slovenia	90.0	118.3	Q
35	19	Daniel Cacina	Romania	93.0	117.0	Q
36	10	Francesco Cecon	Italy	95.5	116.9	Q
37	47	Marius Lindvik	Norway	94.0	116.2	Q
38	28	Junshiro Kobayashi	Japan	93.0	116.1	Q
39	23	Yevhen Marusiak	Ukraine	92.0	114.9	Q
39	5	Decker Dean	United States	94.0	114.9	Q
41	24	Roman Koudelka	Czech Republic	92.0	114.1	Q
42	26	Vilho Palosaari	Finland	90.0	114.0	Q
43	4	Mihnea Spulber	Romania	93.5	112.4	Q
44	22	Andrew Urlaub	United States	90.0	112.2	Q
45	1	Eetu Nousiainen	Finland	91.0	111.8	Q
46	33	Alex Insam	Italy	93.0	111.5	Q
47	17	Radek Rydl	Czech Republic	91.0	111.4	Q
48	20	Danil Vassilyev	Kazakhstan	89.0	111.1	Q
49	42	Giovanni Bresadola	Italy	91.0	110.1	Q
50	16	Remo Imhof	Switzerland	90.0	107.9	Q
51	15	Vitaliy Kalinichenko	Ukraine	90.0	107.4	
52	18	Kevin Maltsev	Estonia	90.0	106.5	
53	3	Sabirżan Muminow	Kazakhstan	89.0	106.4	
54	8	Muhammed Ali Bedir	Turkey	88.0	105.5	
55	14	Nicolae Mitrofan	Romania	86.0	104.3	
56	13	Sergey Tkachenko	Kazakhstan	86.0	101.7	
57	2	Zhen Weijie	China	89.0	101.5	
58	12	Song Qiwu	China	84.0	96.1	
59	9	Svyastoslav Nazarenko	Kazakhstan	83.5	92.9	
60	11	Andrei Feldorean	Romania	83.5	92.0	
61	6	Zhou Xiaoyang	China	79.0	78.0	
62	7	Alan Gobozovi	Georgia	67.0	58.7	

== Final ==
The first round was held on 25 February 2023 at 17:00 and the final round at 18:22.

Rank	Bib	Name	Country	Round 1			Final round			Total
Rank	Bib	Name	Country	Distance (m)	Points	Rank	Distance (m)	Points	Rank	Points
1st place, gold medalist(s)	46	Piotr Żyła	Poland	97.5	127.6	13	105.0	134.2	1	261.8
2nd place, silver medalist(s)	45	Andreas Wellinger	Germany	101.0	132.7	2	102.0	126.5	3	259.2
3rd place, bronze medalist(s)	42	Karl Geiger	Germany	100.0	131.4	3	101.5	126.3	4	257.7
4	47	Stefan Kraft	Austria	102.5	133.5	1	99.0	123.8	8	257.3
5	49	Dawid Kubacki	Poland	97.0	131.1	4	102.0	125.8	5	256.9
6	38	Kamil Stoch	Poland	99.0	128.9	9	102.0	127.4	2	256.3
7	32	Constantin Schmid	Germany	97.5	129.2	5	101.0	124.6	7	253.8
8	39	Jan Hörl	Austria	96.0	127.7	12	101.0	125.6	6	253.3
9	48	Anže Lanišek	Slovenia	99.5	129.1	6	100.0	122.8	9	251.9
10	43	Timi Zajc	Slovenia	99.0	129.0	7	101.0	122.7	11	251.7
11	50	Halvor Egner Granerud	Norway	96.5	128.8	10	97.5	122.8	9	251.6
12	34	Johann André Forfang	Norway	97.5	126.3	16	97.5	118.0	15	244.3
13	37	Markus Eisenbichler	Germany	100.0	127.6	13	98.0	115.4	17	243.0
14	41	Daniel Tschofenig	Austria	99.0	127.9	11	92.0	114.8	18	242.7
15	40	Michael Hayböck	Austria	98.5	129.0	7	93.0	110.3	23	239.3
16	28	Paweł Wąsek	Poland	93.5	116.6	30	96.0	120.2	12	236.8
17	11	Lovro Kos	Slovenia	95.5	117.6	28	97.0	119.1	13	236.7
17	33	Yevhen Marusiak	Ukraine	97.5	116.8	29	103.0	119.9	14	236.7
19	29	Gregor Deschwanden	Switzerland	97.5	122.1	19	93.5	113.6	19	235.7
20	26	Aleksander Zniszczoł	Poland	97.5	118.6	25	93.0	117.0	16	235.6
21	27	Kristoffer Eriksen Sundal	Norway	97.5	120.9	20	91.0	113.0	20	233.9
22	35	Marius Lindvik	Norway	97.0	122.3	18	93.0	111.2	22	233.5
23	36	Žiga Jelar	Slovenia	96.0	125.6	17	90.0	107.2	28	232.8
24	25	Antti Aalto	Finland	91.5	120.0	22	90.5	112.4	21	232.4
25	31	Naoki Nakamura	Japan	93.0	120.0	22	91.5	109.8	24	229.8
26	10	Andrew Urlaub	United States	98.0	118.6	25	91.5	108.5	26	227.1
27	23	Niko Kytösaho	Finland	96.5	117.9	27	91.0	108.7	25	226.6
28	18	Simon Ammann	Switzerland	97.5	119.0	24	87.0	107.5	27	226.5
29	17	Fatih Arda İpcioğlu	Turkey	93.0	120.1	21	87.0	100.7	29	220.8
30	44	Ryōyū Kobayashi	Japan	97.0	126.7	15	Disqualified			
31	19	Artti Aigro	Estonia	93.0	116.1	31	Did not qualify			
32	24	Vladimir Zografski	Bulgaria	99.5	115.6	32	Did not qualify			
33	9	Killian Peier	Switzerland	93.5	114.2	33	Did not qualify			
34	1	Eetu Nousiainen	Finland	91.0	113.5	34	Did not qualify			
35	5	Remo Imhof	Switzerland	94.5	112.9	35	Did not qualify			
36	7	Daniel Cacina	Romania	96.0	112.7	36	Did not qualify			
37	14	Vilho Palosaari	Finland	94.0	112.4	37	Did not qualify			
38	20	Mackenzie Boyd-Clowes	Canada	92.5	112.2	38	Did not qualify			
39	15	Casey Larson	United States	92.5	108.7	39	Did not qualify			
40	4	Francesco Cecon	Italy	94.5	107.8	40	Did not qualify			
41	30	Giovanni Bresadola	Italy	87.5	107.7	41	Did not qualify			
42	13	Erik Belshaw	United States	92.0	106.6	42	Did not qualify			
43	22	Ren Nikaido	Japan	91.5	105.9	43	Did not qualify			
44	21	Alex Insam	Italy	90.5	105.8	44	Did not qualify			
45	3	Decker Dean	United States	90.0	105.0	45	Did not qualify			
46	12	Roman Koudelka	Czech Republic	90.0	104.5	46	Did not qualify			
47	16	Junshiro Kobayashi	Japan	89.0	104.4	47	Did not qualify			
48	6	Radek Rydl	Czech Republic	91.0	102.9	48	Did not qualify			
49	2	Mihnea Spulber	Romania	87.5	101.1	49	Did not qualify			
50	8	Danil Vassilyev	Kazakhstan	89.5	96.1	50	Did not qualify			
