= FIS Nordic World Ski Championships 2023 – Men's individual large hill =

Men's individual large hill at the FIS Nordic World Ski Championships 2023
- Venue: Bloudkova velikanka (HS138)
- Location: Planica, Slovenia
- Dates: 2 March (qualification); 3 March
- Competitors: 50 from 18 nations
- Winning points: 287.5

Medalists
| gold medal | Timi Zajc | Slovenia |
| silver medal | Ryōyū Kobayashi | Japan |
| bronze medal | Dawid Kubacki | Poland |

The Men's individual large hill competition at the FIS Nordic World Ski Championships 2023 was held on 2nd and 3rd March 2023.

== Qualification ==
The qualification was held on 2nd March at 17:30.

| Rank | Bib | Name | Country | Distance (m) | Points | Notes |
|---|---|---|---|---|---|---|
| 1 | 54 | Timi Zajc | Slovenia | 136.0 | 142.5 | Q |
| 2 | 61 | Dawid Kubacki | Poland | 131.5 | 137.1 | Q |
| 3 | 49 | Kamil Stoch | Poland | 136.0 | 136.9 | Q |
| 4 | 45 | Johann André Forfang | Norway | 136.0 | 133.4 | Q |
| 5 | 56 | Ryōyū Kobayashi | Japan | 131.0 | 132.9 | Q |
| 6 | 59 | Stefan Kraft | Austria | 128.5 | 132.3 | Q |
| 7 | 50 | Jan Hörl | Austria | 134.5 | 130.4 | Q |
| 7 | 53 | Karl Geiger | Germany | 131.0 | 130.4 | Q |
| 9 | 62 | Halvor Egner Granerud | Norway | 129.0 | 130.0 | Q |
| 10 | 44 | Domen Prevc | Slovenia | 133.0 | 128.1 | Q |
| 11 | 52 | Daniel Tschofenig | Austria | 132.5 | 128.0 | Q |
| 12 | 57 | Andreas Wellinger | Germany | 128.0 | 127.1 | Q |
| 13 | 60 | Anže Lanišek | Slovenia | 126.5 | 127.0 | Q |
| 14 | 51 | Michael Hayböck | Austria | 131.5 | 126.4 | Q |
| 15 | 46 | Marius Lindvik | Norway | 131.5 | 126.3 | Q |
| 16 | 58 | Piotr Żyła | Poland | 126.0 | 125.0 | Q |
| 17 | 29 | Fatih Arda İpcioğlu | Turkey | 131.5 | 124.5 | Q |
| 18 | 48 | Markus Eisenbichler | Germany | 132.0 | 124.0 | Q |
| 19 | 43 | Constantin Schmid | Germany | 131.0 | 123.3 | Q |
| 20 | 55 | Manuel Fettner | Austria | 127.0 | 122.9 | Q |
| 21 | 47 | Žiga Jelar | Slovenia | 129.0 | 121.9 | Q |
| 22 | 39 | Kristoffer Eriksen Sundal | Norway | 130.0 | 121.2 | Q |
| 23 | 25 | Erik Belshaw | United States | 127.0 | 120.4 | Q |
| 23 | 30 | Simon Ammann | Switzerland | 131.0 | 120.4 | Q |
| 25 | 41 | Giovanni Bresadola | Italy | 129.5 | 118.8 | Q |
| 26 | 31 | Artti Aigro | Estonia | 127.0 | 117.9 | Q |
| 27 | 23 | Yevhen Marusiak | Ukraine | 128.0 | 117.1 | Q |
| 28 | 15 | Eetu Nousiainen | Finland | 128.5 | 116.3 | Q |
| 29 | 37 | Antti Aalto | Finland | 127.5 | 115.6 | Q |
| 30 | 35 | Niko Kytösaho | Finland | 126.5 | 113.9 | Q |
| 31 | 38 | Aleksander Zniszczoł | Poland | 127.5 | 113.6 | Q |
| 32 | 36 | Vladimir Zografski | Bulgaria | 126.0 | 113.3 | Q |
| 33 | 40 | Gregor Deschwanden | Switzerland | 127.0 | 111.9 | Q |
| 34 | 34 | Ren Nikaido | Japan | 125.0 | 110.3 | Q |
| 35 | 32 | Mackenzie Boyd-Clowes | Canada | 124.5 | 110.0 | Q |
| 36 | 42 | Naoki Nakamura | Japan | 124.5 | 108.5 | Q |
| 37 | 33 | Alex Insam | Italy | 122.5 | 106.3 | Q |
| 38 | 21 | Killian Peier | Switzerland | 119.5 | 104.2 | Q |
| 39 | 10 | Decker Dean | United States | 122.5 | 103.6 | Q |
| 40 | 27 | Casey Larson | United States | 119.5 | 101.0 | Q |
| 41 | 6 | Remo Imhof | Switzerland | 121.5 | 100.4 | Q |
| 42 | 24 | Roman Koudelka | Czech Republic | 118.5 | 100.0 | Q |
| 43 | 28 | Junshiro Kobayashi | Japan | 119.0 | 99.6 | Q |
| 44 | 26 | Vilho Palosaari | Finland | 117.0 | 98.1 | Q |
| 45 | 4 | Vitaliy Kalinichenko | Ukraine | 120.0 | 97.8 | Q |
| 46 | 3 | Francesco Cecon | Italy | 118.5 | 96.1 | Q |
| 47 | 19 | Daniel Cacina | Romania | 113.5 | 93.4 | Q |
| 48 | 20 | Danil Vassilyev | Kazakhstan | 114.0 | 89.7 | Q |
| 49 | 17 | Radek Rydl | Czech Republic | 112.5 | 88.8 | Q |
| 50 | 14 | Mihnea Alexandru Spulber | Romania | 117.0 | 87.8 | Q |
| 51 | 18 | Kevin Maltsev | Estonia | 111.0 | 85.6 | |
| 52 | 2 | Muhammed Ali Bedir | Turkey | 110.0 | 81.7 | |
| 53 | 8 | Sergey Tkachenko | Kazakhstan | 111.0 | 79.2 | |
| 54 | 9 | Sabirżan Muminow | Kazakhstan | 111.0 | 78.8 | |
| 55 | 1 | Andrei Feldorean | Romania | 107.5 | 77.5 | |
| 56 | 16 | Nikita Devyatkin | Kazakhstan | 106.0 | 72.7 | |
| 57 | 5 | Song Qiwu | China | 103.5 | 65.4 | |
| 58 | 11 | Zhen Weijie | China | 104.5 | 63.5 | |
| 59 | 13 | Zhou Xiaoyang | China | 102.0 | 60.1 | |
| 60 | 12 | Alan Gobozovi | Georgia | 91.5 | 41.0 | |
| | 22 | Andrew Urlaub | United States | Disqualified | | |
| | 7 | Nicolae Mitrofan | Romania | Not permitted to start | | |

== Final ==
The first round was started on 3 March at 17:30 and the final round at 18:38.

| Rank | Bib | Name | Country | Round 1 | | | Final round | | | Total |
| Rank | Bib | Name | Country | Distance (m) | Points | Rank | Distance (m) | Points | Rank | Points |
|---|---|---|---|---|---|---|---|---|---|---|
| 1st place, gold medalist(s) | 42 | Timi Zajc | Slovenia | 137.5 | 143.3 | 2 | 137.0 | 144.2 | 1 | 287.5 |
| 2nd place, silver medalist(s) | 44 | Ryōyū Kobayashi | Japan | 135.0 | 144.0 | 1 | 129.5 | 132.8 | 9 | 276.8 |
| 3rd place, bronze medalist(s) | 49 | Dawid Kubacki | Poland | 129.0 | 138.1 | 4 | 135.0 | 138.1 | 3 | 276.2 |
| 4 | 37 | Kamil Stoch | Poland | 131.5 | 136.0 | 6 | 134.5 | 136.1 | 5 | 272.2 |
| 5 | 36 | Markus Eisenbichler | Germany | 131.0 | 134.6 | 7 | 136.0 | 136.8 | 4 | 271.4 |
| 6 | 47 | Stefan Kraft | Austria | 125.5 | 130.6 | 11 | 136.0 | 140.3 | 2 | 270.9 |
| 7 | 50 | Halvor Egner Granerud | Norway | 131.0 | 141.0 | 3 | 130.0 | 128.2 | 14 | 269.2 |
| 8 | 41 | Karl Geiger | Germany | 137.5 | 136.8 | 5 | 133.5 | 132.1 | 10 | 268.9 |
| 9 | 46 | Piotr Żyła | Poland | 128.5 | 130.9 | 9 | 133.5 | 135.1 | 6 | 266.0 |
| 10 | 33 | Johann André Forfang | Norway | 131.5 | 129.6 | 13 | 133.5 | 133.7 | 7 | 263.3 |
| 11 | 48 | Anže Lanišek | Slovenia | 124.5 | 129.5 | 14 | 133.0 | 133.6 | 8 | 263.1 |
| 12 | 40 | Daniel Tschofenig | Austria | 134.0 | 131.8 | 8 | 130.0 | 129.8 | 12 | 261.6 |
| 13 | 45 | Andreas Wellinger | Germany | 127.5 | 129.9 | 12 | 130.5 | 131.5 | 11 | 261.4 |
| 14 | 38 | Jan Hörl | Austria | 130.0 | 130.7 | 10 | 130.0 | 126.4 | 19 | 257.1 |
| 15 | 39 | Michael Hayböck | Austria | 129.0 | 125.1 | 16 | 129.5 | 127.9 | 15 | 268.9 |
| 16 | 35 | Žiga Jelar | Slovenia | 126.5 | 124.2 | 18 | 128.5 | 122.6 | 16 | 251.8 |
| 17 | 31 | Constantin Schmid | Germany | 127.5 | 123.3 | 20 | 130.0 | 126.7 | 18 | 250.0 |
| 18 | 27 | Kristoffer Eriksen Sundal | Norway | 125.0 | 121.2 | 24 | 130.0 | 128.6 | 13 | 249.8 |
| 19 | 34 | Marius Lindvik | Norway | 128.0 | 122.3 | 21 | 129.5 | 127.4 | 16 | 249.7 |
| 20 | 43 | Manuel Fettner | Austria | 128.0 | 127.7 | 15 | 128.0 | 121.7 | 22 | 249.4 |
| 21 | 32 | Domen Prevc | Slovenia | 130.0 | 124.2 | 19 | 127.5 | 122.6 | 20 | 246.8 |
| 22 | 18 | Simon Ammann | Switzerland | 127.5 | 124.7 | 17 | 128.0 | 121.0 | 24 | 245.7 |
| 23 | 26 | Aleksander Zniszczoł | Poland | 124.5 | 122.0 | 20 | 127.0 | 122.6 | 22 | 244.6 |
| 24 | 28 | Gregor Deschwanden | Switzerland | 126.0 | 121.6 | 23 | 124.5 | 119.0 | 26 | 240.6 |
| 25 | 19 | Artti Aigro | Estonia | 125.5 | 120.5 | 25 | 126.5 | 118.0 | 28 | 238.5 |
| 26 | 13 | Erik Belshaw | United States | 126.0 | 118.7 | 26 | 127.5 | 118.9 | 27 | 237.6 |
| 27 | 11 | Yevhen Marusiak | Ukraine | 125.0 | 114.4 | 29 | 130.0 | 121.3 | 23 | 235.7 |
| 28 | 23 | Niko Kytösaho | Finland | 123.0 | 115.7 | 28 | 128.0 | 119.2 | 25 | 234.9 |
| 29 | 30 | Naoki Nakamura | Japan | 123.5 | 118.3 | 27 | 124.0 | 112.2 | 29 | 230.5 |
| 30 | 6 | Eetu Nousiainen | Finland | 125.5 | 114.1 | 30 | 119.5 | 100.5 | 30 | 214.6 |
| 31 | 25 | Antti Aalto | Finland | 120.0 | 111.3 | 31 | Did not qualify | | | |
| 32 | 22 | Ren Nikaido | Japan | 121.5 | 110.2 | 32 | Did not qualify | | | |
| 33 | 20 | Mackenzie Boyd-Clowes | Canada | 119.0 | 109.2 | 33 | Did not qualify | | | |
| 34 | 16 | Junshiro Kobayashi | Japan | 119.0 | 107.6 | 34 | Did not qualify | | | |
| 35 | 24 | Vladimir Zografski | Bulgaria | 119.0 | 107.3 | 35 | Did not qualify | | | |
| 36 | 15 | Casey Larson | United States | 120.0 | 105.5 | 36 | Did not qualify | | | |
| 37 | 17 | Fatih Arda İpcioğlu | Turkey | 118.0 | 105.2 | 37 | Did not qualify | | | |
| 38 | 2 | Vitaliy Kalinichenko | Ukraine | 121.5 | 105.1 | 38 | Did not qualify | | | |
| 39 | 4 | Decker Dean | United States | 120.5 | 104.4 | 39 | Did not qualify | | | |
| 40 | 21 | Alex Insam | Italy | 119.5 | 104.0 | 40 | Did not qualify | | | |
| 41 | 1 | Francesco Cecon | Italy | 119.5 | 103.9 | 41 | Did not qualify | | | |
| 42 | 12 | Roman Koudelka | Czech Republic | 118.0 | 101.7 | 42 | Did not qualify | | | |
| 43 | 9 | Danil Vassilyev | Kazakhstan | 118.5 | 100.9 | 43 | Did not qualify | | | |
| 44 | 3 | Remo Imhof | Switzerland | 119.5 | 100.3 | 44 | Did not qualify | | | |
| 45 | 29 | Giovanni Bresadola | Italy | 114.5 | 93.9 | 45 | Did not qualify | | | |
| 46 | 14 | Vilho Palosaari | Finland | 114.0 | 92.5 | 46 | Did not qualify | | | |
| 47 | 10 | Killian Peier | Switzerland | 115.0 | 92.1 | 47 | Did not qualify | | | |
| 48 | 7 | Radek Rydl | Czech Republic | 113.5 | 88.5 | 48 | Did not qualify | | | |
| 49 | 8 | Daniel Cacina | Romania | 113.5 | 88.4 | 49 | Did not qualify | | | |
| 50 | 5 | Mihnea Alexandru Spulber | Romania | 109.5 | 80.6 | 50 | Did not qualify | | | |
