= Rælingen SK =

Norwegian skiing club

Logo.

Rælingen Skiklubb is a Norwegian sports club from Rælingen, founded on 31 March 1930. It has sections for cross-country skiing, ski jumping, and aircross. Their base of operation is Marikollen Ski Center.

Famous members include alpine skier Henrik Kristoffersen and ski jumper Marius Lindvik.
