= Erik Belshaw =

American ski jumper (born 2004)

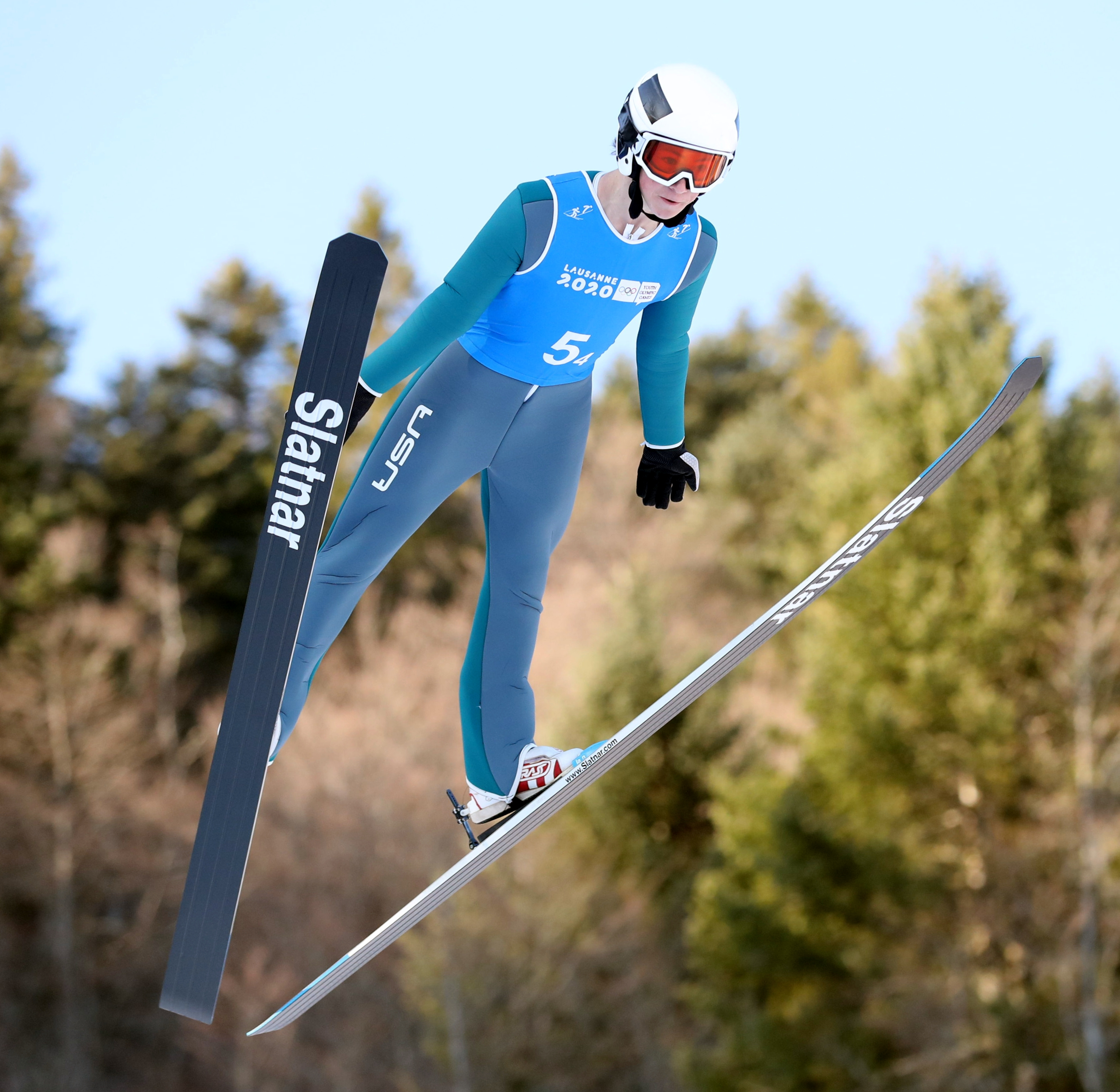

Personal information
- Nationality: United States
- Born: August 23, 2004 (age 21) Steamboat Springs, U.S.

Sport
- Sport: Skiing
- Club: St. Springs Winter Sports Club

World Cup career
- Seasons: 2023–present
- Indiv. starts: 55
- Team starts: 10

Achievements and titles
- Personal bests: 230 m (750 ft); Oberstdorf, 24 February 2024
Medal record
Men's ski jumping
Representing United States
Junior World Championship
Silver medal – second place	2024 Planica	Individual NH
- Updated on 29 March 2026

Erik Belshaw (born August 23, 2004) is an American ski jumper.

== Career ==
Born in Steamboat Springs, Colorado, he is a member of Steamboat Springs Winter Sports Club.

On December 17, 2022 he made World Cup debut at Engelberg, where he qualified to the competition reaching 38th place. And the next day with first World Cup points ended at 24th place.

Together with Tate Frantz, he took 7th place at Super Team World Cup event in Wisła.

At the 2024 Nordic Junior World Ski Championships in Planica he took silver medal at the normal hill individual and became first ever American to reach podium at Junior World Championships.

== Personal life ==
His older sister, Annika Belshaw, was also a ski jumper.

== Major tournament results ==
=== FIS Nordic World Ski Championships ===
Year	Place	Individual		Team	
Year	Place	Normal	Large	Men	Mixed
2021	(Germany) Oberstdorf	q	q	10	—
2023	(Slovenia) Planica	42	26	8	—
2025	(Norway) Trondheim	25	41	8	—

=== FIS Ski Flying World Championships ===
Year	Place	Individual	Team
2024	(Austria) Tauplitz	36	9
2026	(Germany) Oberstdorf	q	9

=== FIS Nordic Junior World Ski Championships ===
Year	Place	Individual
Year	Place	Normal
2024	(Slovenia) Planica	2nd place, silver medalist(s)

== World Cup ==
=== Standings ===
Season	Overall	4H	SF	RA	P7
2022–23	58	45	—	52	39
2023–24	35	39	19	28	13
2024–25	51	—	49	53	—
2025–26	—	—	—	N/A	—

=== Individual starts ===
winner (1); second (2); third (3); did not compete (–); failed to qualify (q); disqualified (DQ)
Season	1	2	3	4	5	6	7	8	9	10	11	12	13	14	15	16	17	18	19	20	21	22	23	24	25	26	27	28	29	30	31	32	Points
2022–23	Wisła	Wisła	Kuusamo	Kuusamo	Titisee-Neustadt	Titisee-Neustadt	Engelberg	Engelberg	Oberstdorf	Garmisch-Partenkirchen	Innsbruck	Bischofshofen	Zakopane	Sapporo	Sapporo	Sapporo	Tauplitz	Tauplitz	Willingen	Willingen	Lake Placid	Lake Placid	Râșnov	Oslo	Oslo	Lillehammer	Lillehammer	Vikersund	Vikersund	Lahti	Planica	Planica	17
2022–23	–	–	–	–	–	–	38	24	26	q	47	q	48	–	–	–	–	–	–	–	q	47	–	42	q	–	36	q	q	26	q	–	17
2023–24	Kuusamo	Kuusamo	Lillehammer	Lillehammer	Klingenthal	Klingenthal	Engelberg	Engelberg	Oberstdorf	Garmisch-Partenkirchen	Innsbruck	Bischofshofen	Wisła	Zakopane	Willingen	Willingen	Lake Placid	Lake Placid	Sapporo	Sapporo	Oberstdorf	Oberstdorf	Lahti	Lahti	Oslo	Oslo	Trondheim	Trondheim	Vikersund	Vikersund	Planica	Planica	137
2023–24	42	24	q	q	36	q	43	47	31	36	38	41	29	q	–	–	–	–	26	27	18	12	24	15	33	33	28	24	30	27	8	17	137
2024–25	Lillehammer	Lillehammer	Kuusamo	Kuusamo	Wisła	Wisła	Titisee-Neustadt	Titisee-Neustadt	Engelberg	Engelberg	Oberstdorf	Garmisch-Partenkirchen	Innsbruck	Bischofshofen	Zakopane	Oberstdorf	Oberstdorf	Willingen	Willingen	Lake Placid	Lake Placid	Sapporo	Sapporo	Oslo	Vikersund	Vikersund	Lahti	Planica	Planica				26
2024–25	37	q	q	–	–	–	31	42	47	q	–	–	–	–	34	q	30	13	21	29	39	34	36	43	–	–	–	–	–				26
2025–26	Lillehammer	Lillehammer	Falun	Falun	Ruka	Wisła	Wisła	Klingenthal	Klingenthal	Engelberg	Engelberg	Oberstdorf	Garmisch-Partenkirchen	Innsbruck	Bischofshofen	Zakopane	Sapporo	Sapporo	Willingen	Willingen	Bad Mitterndorf	Bad Mitterndorf	Lahti	Lahti	Oslo	Oslo	Vikersund	Planica	Planica				0
2025–26	43	q	47	q	43	44	40	q	44	q	DQ	q	q	–	–	–	45	q	–	–	–	–	45	q	–	–	–	–	–				0
