= FIS Ski Flying World Championships 2022 =

2022 edition of the FIS Ski Flying World Championships

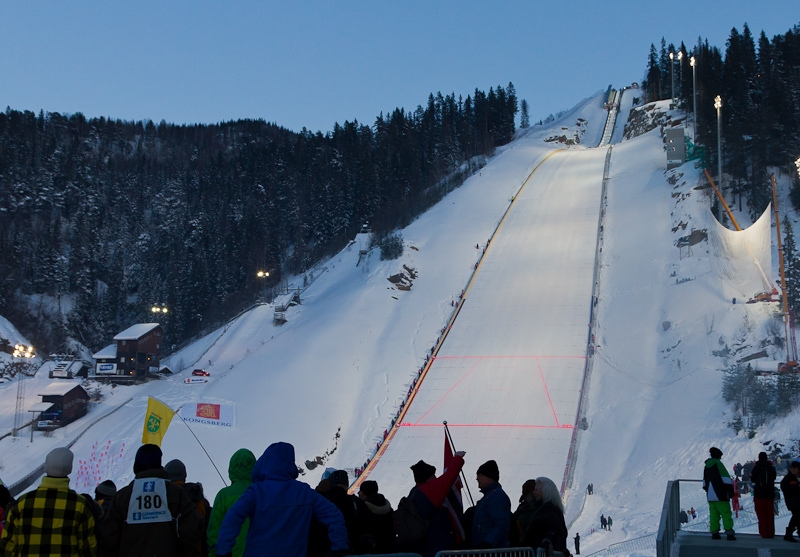
- Host city: Vikersund, Norway
- Nations: 16
- Athletes: 55
- Sport: Ski flying
- Events: 2
- Opening: 10 March
- Closing: 13 March
- Main venue: Vikersundbakken HS240

The FIS Ski Flying World Championships 2022 were the 27th Ski Flying World Championships, held from 10 to 13 March 2022 in Vikersund, Norway. It is the fifth competition of its rank to be held at this location (previously in 1977, 1990, 2000 and 2012).

The defending champion in the individual competition was German Karl Geiger and in the team competition the Norwegian national team.

On 1 March 2022, following the 2022 Russian invasion of Ukraine, FIS decided to exclude athletes from Russia and Belarus from FIS competitions, with an immediate effect.

Only seven national teams competed in the team competition – this is the smallest number in the history of the championship.

== Schedule ==
Date	Competition	Longest jump of the day	Metres	Feet
9 March 2022	Hill test 1	(Norway) Anders Håre	228.5	749
9 March 2022	Hill test 2	(Norway) Iver Olaussen	234.5	769
10 March 2022	Official training 1	(Slovenia) Domen Prevc	242	794
10 March 2022	Official training 2	(Slovenia) Domen Prevc	238.5	782
10 March 2022	Qualification	(Austria) Michael Hayböck	233	764
11 March 2022	1st round Individual	(Slovenia) Timi Zajc	242.5	796
11 March 2022	2nd round Individual	(Austria) Stefan Kraft	230	755
12 March 2022	3rd round Individual	(Slovenia) Timi Zajc	243.5	799
12 March 2022	4th round Individual	(Slovenia) Timi Zajc	235.5	773
13 March 2022	1st round Team event	(Slovenia) Anže Lanišek	234	768
13 March 2022	2nd round Team event	(Germany) Karl Geiger	238	781

== Test results ==
=== Hill tests ===
On 9 March 2022, first and second test was held.

Bib	Name	Round 1	Round 2
F1	(Norway) Anders Ladehaug	195.5 m	156 m
F2	(Norway) Simen Kvarstad	172.5 m	187 m PB
F3	(Norway) Iver Myhre	127.5 m	115 m
F4	(Norway) Ole Gudbrand Kihle Gravermoen	100 m	115 m
F5	(Norway) Richard Selbekk Hansen	128 m	140 m
F6	(Norway) Jonas Viken	193.5 m	205.5 m PB
F7	(Norway) Ole Kristian Baarset	177 m PB	167.5 m
F8	(Norway) Øystein Thorshov	165.5 m	173 m PB
F9	(Norway) Anders Varsi Breivik	187 m	190.5 m
F10	(Norway) Jens Gaarder	143.5 m	129 m
F11	(Norway) Jo Rømme Mellingsæter	199 m PB	172.5 m
F12	(Norway) Pål Håkon Bjørtomt	184 m PB	130 m
F13	(Norway) Anders Håre	228.5 m	230.5 m PB
F14	(Norway) Sølve Jokerud Strand	196 m	171 m
F15	(Norway) Andreas Buskum	181 m	177.5 m
F16	(Norway) Iver Olaussen	75 m	234.5 m PB
F17	(Norway) Sander Vossan Eriksen	217.5 m	142.5 m
F18	(Norway) Marius Aas Hast	99 m	167.5 m PB
F19	(Norway) Matias Braathen	DNS	
F20	(Norway) Anders Fannemel	194 m	212 m
F21	(Norway) Oscar Westerheim	186 m	199 m
F22	(Norway) Kristoffer Sundal	173 m	198 m PB
F23	(Norway) Robin Pedersen	220 m	218 m
F24	(Norway) Bendik Jakobsen Heggli	213 m PB	129.5 m
F25	(Norway) Sondre Ringen	193.5 m	200 m
F26	(Norway) Benjamin Østvold	160 m	189.5 m

== Official training results ==
The training held on 10 March 2022 at 13:15.

Bib	Name	Round 1	Round 2
1	(Finland) Kalle Heikkinen	161.5 PB	152.5
2	(Turkey) Muhammed Ali Bedir	155.5	167 PB
3	(Kazakhstan) Sabirzhan Muminov	180.5	168.5
4	(Italy) Alex Insam	202	182.5
5	(Canada) Matthew Soukup	160	155.5
6	(Estonia) Kevin Maltsev	158.5	154
7	(Czech Republic) Čestmír Kožíšek	160.5	146
8	(United States) Casey Larson	175	164
9	(Turkey) Muhammet İrfan Çintımar	131.5	129
10	(Kazakhstan) Danil Vassilyev	141	155 PB
11	(Turkey) Fatih Arda İpcioğlu	183.5 PB NR	161
12	(Poland) Andrzej Stękała	195	209
13	(Italy) Giovanni Bresadola	203.5	206.5
14	(Slovenia) Domen Prevc	242	238.5
15	(Estonia) Artti Aigro	208	215
16	(Finland) Eetu Nousiainen	198	205
17	(Finland) Antti Aalto	208	188
18	(Poland) Jakub Wolny	210.5	205
19	(Finland) Niko Kytösaho	212	219 PB
20	(Bulgaria) Vladimir Zografski	173	174.5
21	(Japan) Keiichi Satō	177.5	171.5
22	(Austria) Michael Hayböck	229.5	221
23	(Switzerland) Simon Ammann	215.5	210.5
24	(Poland) Paweł Wąsek	206	210.5 PB
25	(Norway) Fredrik Villumstad	183	193.5
26	(Austria) Ulrich Wohlgenannt	228.5	219
27	(Poland) Dawid Kubacki	200	205
28	(Germany) Severin Freund	222.5	211
29	(Japan) Junshirō Kobayashi	187	198
30	(Japan) Naoki Nakamura	192.5	185
31	(Germany) Andreas Wellinger	225	219.5
32	(Norway) Johann André Forfang	233	231
33	(Switzerland) Gregor Deschwanden	203.5	212
34	(Slovenia) Peter Prevc	239	235.5
35	(Germany) Constantin Schmid	210.5	219
36	(Poland) Piotr Żyła	213.5	222
37	(Poland) Kamil Stoch	209.5	216
38	(Germany) Stephan Leyhe	192	214.5
39	(Norway) Daniel-André Tande	222	222.5
40	(Austria) Manuel Fettner	206.5	216.5
41	(Slovenia) Lovro Kos	219	235
42	(Japan) Yukiya Satō	205	230
43	(Switzerland) Killian Peier	156.5	191
44	(Slovenia) Timi Zajc	225	238
45	(Austria) Daniel Huber	214	214.5
46	(Norway) Robert Johansson	207	234
47	(Slovenia) Cene Prevc	213	213
48	(Austria) Jan Hörl	187.5	197
49	(Slovenia) Anže Lanišek	222.5	227
50	(Austria) Stefan Kraft	215.5	238
51	(Germany) Markus Eisenbichler	211	205
52	(Norway) Marius Lindvik	217.5	224
53	(Norway) Halvor Egner Granerud	172	198
54	(Germany) Karl Geiger	217	233.5
55	(Japan) Ryōyū Kobayashi	217.5	224

== Medal summary ==
=== Medal table ===
* Host nation (Norway)

Rank	Nation	Gold	Silver	Bronze	Total
1	Slovenia	1	1	0	2
2	Norway*	1	0	1	2
3	Germany	0	1	0	1
4	Austria	0	0	1	1
Totals (4 entries)		2	2	2	6

=== Medalists ===
Event	Gold		Silver		Bronze	
Individual	Marius Lindvik; Norway	854.2	Timi Zajc; Slovenia	844.3	Stefan Kraft; Austria	837.5
Team	Slovenia; Domen Prevc; Peter Prevc; Timi Zajc; Anže Lanišek	1,711.5	Germany; Severin Freund; Andreas Wellinger; Markus Eisenbichler; Karl Geiger	1,583.5	Norway; Johann André Forfang; Daniel-André Tande; Halvor Egner Granerud; Marius Lindvik	1,559.6
