= Muhammed Ali Bedir =

Turkish ski jumper (born 2000)

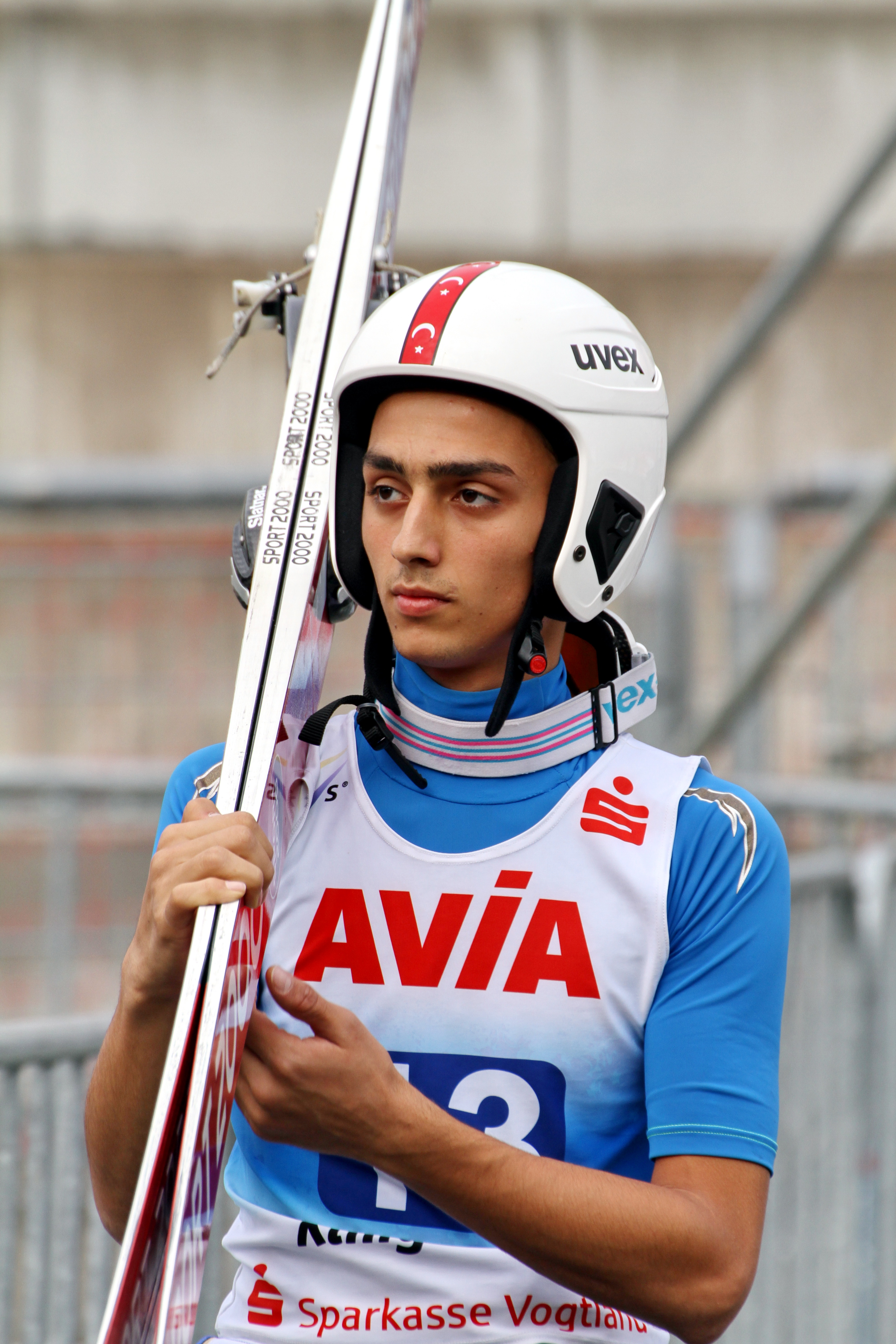

Personal information
- Nationality: Turkey
- Born: 24 March 2000 (age 26) Erzurum, Turkey

Sport
- Sport: Skiing

World Cup career
- Seasons: 2018–present
- Indiv. starts: 6

Achievements and titles
- Personal bests: 212.5 m (697 ft); Tauplitz, 27 January 2023
- Updated on 12 March 2023

Muhammed Ali Bedir (born 24 March 2000) is a Turkish Olympian ski jumper and national record holder.

On 27 January 2023, Bedir wrote history when he became the first Turkish ski jumper to jump over two hundred meters. At the Kulm ski flying hill in Tauplitz, Bad Mitterndorf, Austria he jumped 212.5 meters (697 ft) and tremendously improved the record held by Fatih Arda İpcioğlu.

== Career ==
In 2017/18 season he made his first World Cup entry at the Ruka and stuck at qualification round.

In 2022 he performed at FIS Ski Flying World Championships qualifications, his first major competition.

In 2022/23 season he made his first ever World Cup main event debut at Oberstdorf (4 Hill Tournament).

In his first olympics, at the 2026 Winter Olympics, he finished 48th in the normal hill first round with a distance of 87 meters and a score of 93.1 points, and was eliminated.

== Major Tournament results ==
=== Winter Olympics ===
Year	Place	Individual		Team	
Year	Place	Normal	Large	Men	Mixed
2026	(Italy) Milan and Cortina d'Ampezzo	48	48	15	—

=== FIS Nordic World Ski Championships ===
Year	Place	Individual		Team	
Year	Place	Normal	Large	Men	Mixed
2023	(Slovenia) Planica	q	q	—	—

=== FIS Ski Flying World Championships ===
Year	Place	Individual	Team
2018	(Germany) Oberstdorf	did not participate	
2020	(Slovenia) Planica	did not participate	
2022	(Norway) Vikersund	q	—

== World Cup ==
=== Standings ===
Season	Overall	4H	SF	RA	W5	P7
2017/18	—	—	—	—	—	—
2021/22	—	—	—	—	N/A	64
2022/23		—		55	N/A	

=== Individual starts (6) ===
Season	1	2	3	4	5	6	7	8	9	10	11	12	13	14	15	16	17	18	19	20	21	22	23	24	25	26	27	28	29	30	31	32	Points
2017/18	Wisła	Kuusamo	Nizhny Tagil	Nizhny Tagil	Titisee-Neustadt	Engelberg	Engelberg	Oberstdorf	Garmisch-Partenkirchen	Innsbruck	Bischofshofen	Tauplitz	Zakopane	Willingen	Willingen	Lahti	Oslo	Lillehammer	Trondheim	Vikersund	Planica	Planica											0
2017/18	–	q	–	–	–	–	–	–	–	–	–	–	–	–	–	–	–	–	–	–	–	–											0
2021/22	Nizhny Tagil	Nizhny Tagil	Ruka	Ruka	Wisła	Klingenthal	Klingenthal	Engelberg	Engelberg	Oberstdorf	Garmisch-Partenkirchen	Bischofshofen	Bischofshofen	Bischofshofen	Zakopane	Titisee-Neustadt	Titisee-Neustadt	Willingen	Willingen	Lahti	Lahti	Lillehammer	Oslo	Oslo	Oberstdorf	Oberstdorf	Planica	Planica					0
2021/22	–	–	–	–	–	–	–	–	–	–	–	–	–	–	–	–	–	–	–	–	–	–	–	–	q	q	q	–					0
2022–23	Wisła	Wisła	Kuusamo	Kuusamo	Titisee-Neustadt	Titisee-Neustadt	Engelberg	Engelberg	Oberstdorf	Garmisch-Partenkirchen	Innsbruck	Bischofshofen	Zakopane	Sapporo	Sapporo	Sapporo	Tauplitz	Tauplitz	Willingen	Willingen	Lake Placid	Lake Placid	Râșnov	Oslo	Oslo	Lillehammer	Lillehammer	Vikersund	Vikersund	Lahti	Planica	Planica	0
2022–23	–	–	–	–	–	–	–	–	47	q	48	q	44	q	49	48	q	q	q	q	–	–	–	q	50								0
