= Fatih Arda İpcioğlu =

Turkish ski jumper (born 1997)

Fatih Arda İpçioğlu
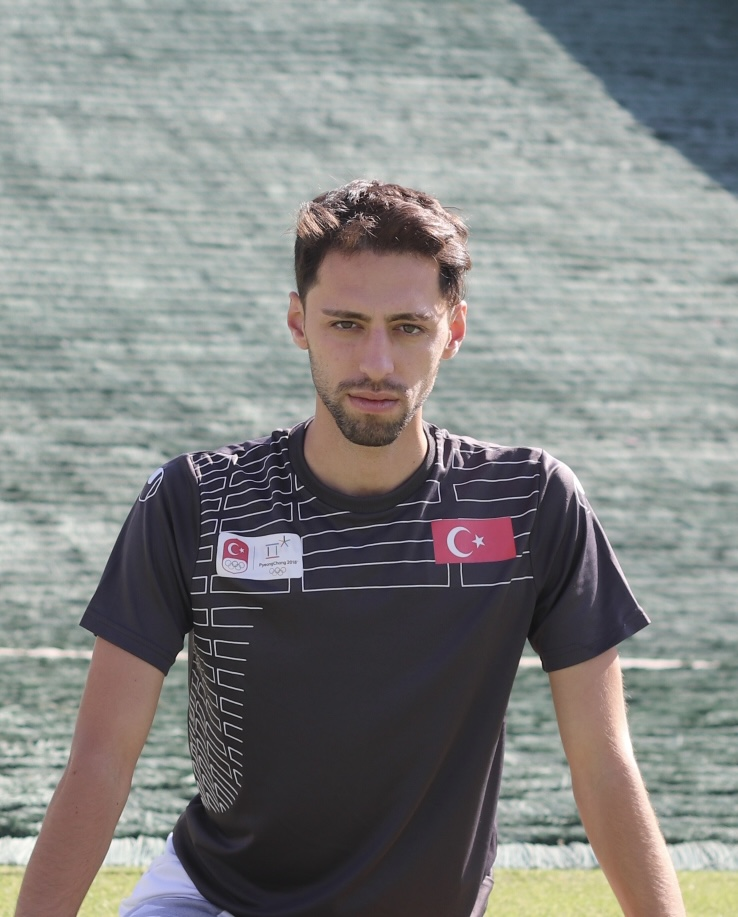
- İpcioğlu in 2020

Personal information
- Nationality: Turkey
- Born: 28 September 1997 (age 29) Erzurum, Turkey
- Height: 176 cm (5 ft 9 in)

Sport
- Sport: Skiing
- Club: ARAS Edaş Ski Club

World Cup career
- Seasons: 2017–2018; 2022–present
- Indiv. starts: 51
- Team starts: 1

Achievements and titles
- Personal bests: 209.5 m (687 ft); Tauplitz, 27 January 2023
- Updated on 16 March 2025

Fatih Arda İpçioğlu (born 28 September 1997) is a Turkish Olympian ski jumper and former national record holder.

== Career ==
In 2017, he became the first Turkish ski jumper who scored Continental Cup points in Erzurum; he also became the first Turkish ski jumper who performed in the Nordic World Championships in Lahti, where he qualified in both normal hill and large hill individual events. He became the first Turkish ski jumper to perform in World Cup in Lillehammer.

In 2018, he qualified for the 2018 Winter Olympics in Pyeongchang, South Korea and became the first Olympic Turkish ski jumper.

He also became the first representative of Turkey to qualify for a competition at the Four Hills Tournament and the first to score World Cup points.

== Major tournament results ==
=== Winter Olympics ===
Year	Place	Individual		Team	
Year	Place	Normal	Large	Men	Mixed
2018	(South Korea) Pyeongchang	—	—	—	N/A
2022	(China) Beijing	36	40	—	—
2026	(Italy) Milan and Cortina d'Ampezzo	44	37	15	—

=== FIS Nordic World Ski Championships ===
Year	Place	Individual		Team	
Year	Place	Normal	Large	Men	Mixed
2017	(Finland) Lahti	q	q	—	—
2019	(Austria) Seefeld	did not participate			
2021	(Germany) Oberstdorf	did not participate			
2023	(Slovenia) Planica	29	37	—	—
2025	(Norway) Trondheim	39	44	—	—

=== FIS Ski Flying World Championships ===
Year	Place	Individual	Team
2018	(Germany) Oberstdorf	did not participate	
2020	(Slovenia) Planica	did not participate	
2022	(Norway) Vikersund	35	—
2024	(Austria) Bad Mitterndorf	39	—

== World Cup ==
=== Standings ===
Season	Overall	4H	SF	RA	W6	P7
2016/17	—	—	—	81	N/A	N/A
2017/18	—	—	—	74	—	—
2021/22	76	44	—	61	N/A	54
2022/23	60	38	—	59	N/A	48
2023/24	64	—	—	—	N/A	—
2024/25	55	43		55	N/A	

=== Individual starts ===
Season	1	2	3	4	5	6	7	8	9	10	11	12	13	14	15	16	17	18	19	20	21	22	23	24	25	26	27	28	29	30	31	32	Points
2016/17	Kuusamo	Kuusamo	Klingenthal	Lillehammer	Lillehammer	Engelberg	Engelberg	Oberstdorf	Garmisch-Partenkirchen	Innsbruck	Bischofshofen	Wisła	Wisła	Zakopane	Willingen	Oberstdorf	Oberstdorf	Sapporo	Sapporo	Pyeongchang	Pyeongchang	Oslo	Lillehammer	Trondheim	Vikersund	Planica	Planica						0
2016/17	–	–	–	–	–	–	–	–	–	–	–	–	–	–	–	–	–	–	–	–	–	–	q	–	–	–	–						0
2017/18	Wisła	Kuusamo	Nizhny Tagil	Nizhny Tagil	Titisee-Neustadt	Engelberg	Engelberg	Oberstdorf	Garmisch-Partenkirchen	Innsbruck	Bischofshofen	Tauplitz	Zakopane	Willingen	Willingen	Lahti	Oslo	Lillehammer	Trondheim	Vikersund	Planica	Planica											0
2017/18	–	q	–	–	–	–	–	q	q	–	–	–	–	–	–	–	q	q	q	–	–	–											0
2021/22	Nizhny Tagil	Nizhny Tagil	Ruka	Ruka	Wisła	Klingenthal	Klingenthal	Engelberg	Engelberg	Oberstdorf	Garmisch-Partenkirchen	Bischofshofen	Bischofshofen	Bischofshofen	Zakopane	Titisee-Neustadt	Titisee-Neustadt	Willingen	Willingen	Lahti	Lahti	Lillehammer	Oslo	Oslo	Oberstdorf	Oberstdorf	Planica	Planica					2
2021/22	46	q	DQ	q	q	q	34	–	–	29	q	42	42	q	43	42	q	–	–	52	q	q	q	q	q	q	q	–					2
2022–23	Wisła	Wisła	Ruka	Ruka	Titisee-Neustadt	Titisee-Neustadt	Engelberg	Engelberg	Oberstdorf	Garmisch-Partenkirchen	Innsbruck	Bischofshofen	Zakopane	Sapporo	Sapporo	Sapporo	Tauplitz	Tauplitz	Willingen	Willingen	Lake Placid	Lake Placid	Râșnov	Oslo	Oslo	Lillehammer	Lillehammer	Vikersund	Vikersund	Lahti	Planica	Planica	16
2022–23	47	47	29	q	24	42	–	–	30	q	35	36	25	37	47	39	34	q	35	q	–	–	–	q	q	q	q	q	q	40	37	–	16
2023–24	Ruka	Ruka	Lillehammer	Lillehammer	Klingenthal	Klingenthal	Engelberg	Engelberg	Oberstdorf	Garmisch-Partenkirchen	Innsbruck	Bischofshofen	Wisła	Zakopane	Willingen	Willingen	Lake Placid	Lake Placid	Sapporo	Sapporo	Oberstdorf	Oberstdorf	Lahti	Lahti	Oslo	Oslo	Trondheim	Trondheim	Vikersund	Vikersund	Planica	Planica	3
2023–24	41	43	34	q	q	47	41	49	–	–	–	–	q	47	28	44	–	–	–	–	–	–	–	–	–	–	–	–	–	–	–	–	3
2024–25	Lillehammer	Lillehammer	Ruka	Ruka	Wisła	Wisła	Titisee-Neustadt	Titisee-Neustadt	Engelberg	Engelberg	Oberstdorf	Garmisch-Partenkirchen	Innsbruck	Bischofshofen	Zakopane	Oberstdorf	Oberstdorf	Willingen	Willingen	Lake Placid	Lake Placid	Sapporo	Sapporo	Oslo	Vikersund	Vikersund	Lahti	Planica	Planica				12
2024–25	30	31	45	q	–	38	20	47	–	–	35	42	35	47	–	–	q	43	47	32	46	–	–	q	q	52							12

Olympic Games
Preceded by Alper Uçar	Flagbearer for Turkey; Pyeongchang County 2018	Succeeded by Ayşenur Duman; Furkan Akar
