= Ryōyū Kobayashi =

Japanese ski jumper (born 1996)

Ryōyū Kobayashi 小林 陵侑
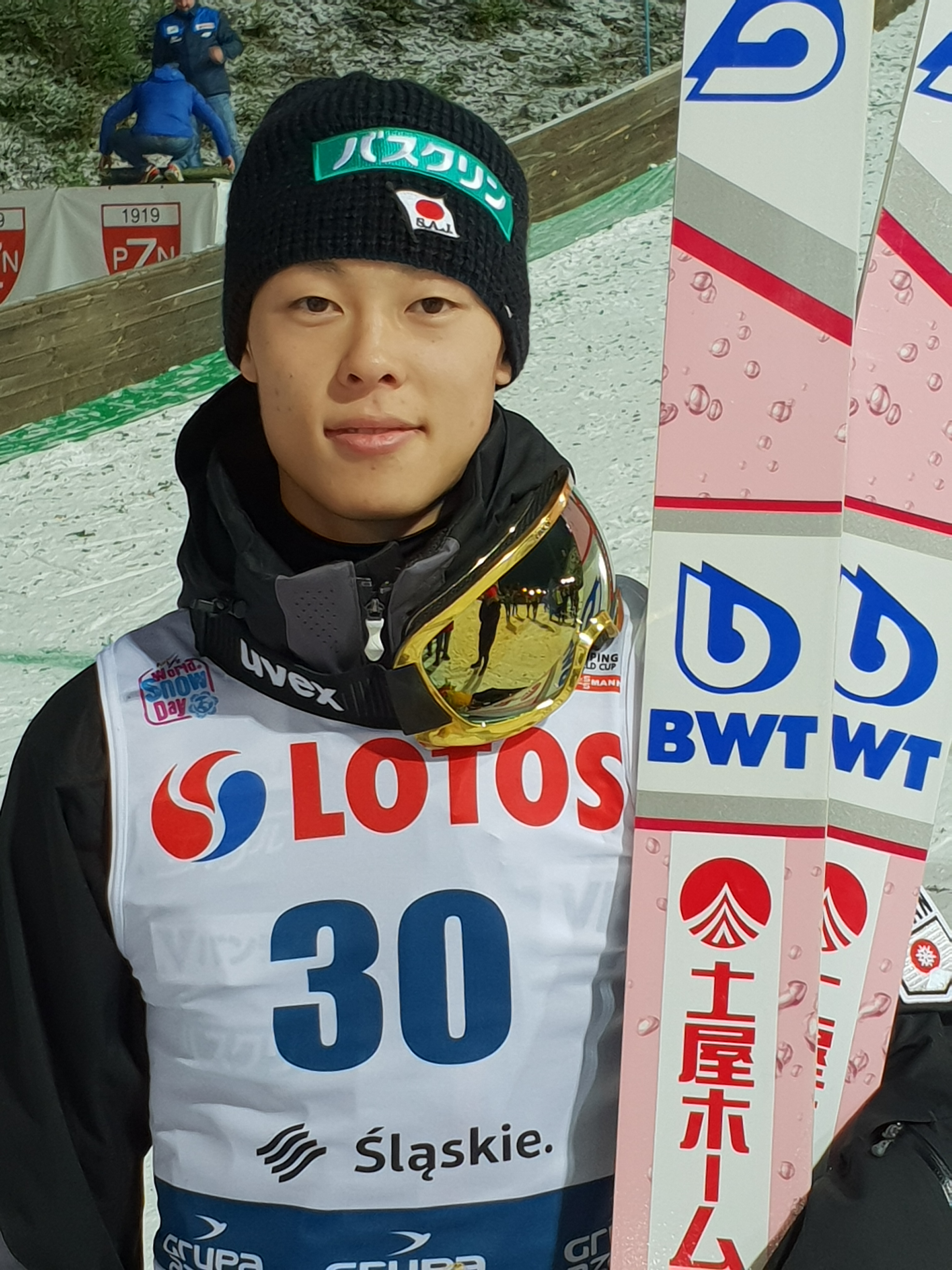
- Kobayashi in Wisła (2018)

Personal information
- Nationality: Japan
- Born: 8 November 1996 (age 30) Hachimantai, Iwate, Japan
- Height: 1.73 m (5 ft 8 in)

Sport
- Sport: Skiing
- Club: Team Roy

World Cup career
- Seasons: 2016–present
- Indiv. starts: 245
- Indiv. podiums: 79
- Indiv. wins: 37
- Team starts: 53
- Team podiums: 10
- Team wins: 1
- Overall titles: 2 (2019, 2022)
- Four Hills titles: 3 (2019, 2022, 2024)
- Ski Flying titles: 1 (2019)
- Raw Air titles: 1 (2019)

Achievements and titles
- Personal bests: 252 m (827 ft); Planica, 24 March 2019
Medal record
Men's ski jumping
Representing Japan
Olympic Games
| Gold medal – first place | 2022 Beijing | Individual NH |
| Silver medal – second place | 2022 Beijing | Individual LH |
| Bronze medal – third place | 2026 Milano Cortina | Mixed team |
World Championships
| Silver medal – second place | 2023 Planica | Individual LH |
| Bronze medal – third place | 2019 Seefeld | Team LH |
| Bronze medal – third place | 2025 Trondheim | Individual LH |
Men's ski flying
Representing Japan
World Championships
| Gold medal – first place | 2026 Oberstdorf | Team |
- Updated on 20 February 2026

Ryōyū Kobayashi (小林 陵侑, Kobayashi Ryōyū; born 8 November 1996) is a Japanese ski jumper. He has won 37 World Cup individual competitions, the World Cup overall title twice, Four Hills Tournament three times, and is an individual Olympics gold medalist.

During his 2018–19 World Cup season, Kobayashi scored 13 individual wins and won all six possible titles in a single season: the World Cup overall title, the Ski Flying World Cup overall, the Four Hills Tournament, the Raw Air tournament, the Planica7 tournament, and Willingen Five tournament.

He is the third ski jumper in history to win the 'Grand Slam' of all four events in the Four Hills Tournament, the gold medal at the 2022 Olympics in Beijing on the normal hill and the silver on the large hill.

With 252 metres (827 feet), the third longest jump in history, he is the current Japanese record holder. In an unofficial event near Akureyri, Iceland in April 2024, he achieved a distance of 291m after being airborne for around 10 seconds. It was an unofficial world record and is not being counted as a ski flying world record by FIS.

== Personal life ==
He was born on 8 November 1996 in Hachimantai, Iwate Prefecture, Japan. He began skiing at the age of five but began ski jumping in the first grade, inspired by his older brother and Japanese ski jumper Junshiro Kobayashi. He made his first ski jumping steps at Tayama Ski Jumping Hill in Hachimantai and Hanawa Jumping Hill in Kazuno, Akita. In 2015, he joined Japanese ski jumping team Tsuchiya Home Ski Team. Shortly after the end of the 2022/2023 season, he announced that he left the team after 8 years and that he created his own club, "Team Roy".

He has two older siblings, Junshirō and Yūka, and a younger brother, Tatsunao; all of them are also ski jumpers. He attended Morioka Central High School, graduating in 2015.

On his own YouTube channel, he shares vlogs from competitions, private life, free time and training.

== Career ==
At the 2018 Winter Olympics, Kobayashi competed in the men's normal hill, placing 7th, as well as the men's large hill, placing 10th. He also competed in the team event with teammates Taku Takeuchi, Noriaki Kasai, and Daiki Ito, finishing in 6th place.

Kobayashi won his first Olympic gold medal at the 2022 Winter Olympics in Beijing in the men's normal hill event. He became the third Japanese athlete to win a gold medal in the individual ski jumping events at the Olympics, after Kazuyoshi Funaki in the individual large hill event in 1998, and Yukio Kasaya in the individual normal hill event in 1972. He also succeeded in the other event, the men's large hill, placing 2nd.

== Major tournament results ==
=== Winter Olympics ===
| Year | Place | Individual | | Team | |
| Year | Place | Normal | Large | Men | Mixed |
|---|---|---|---|---|---|
| 2018 | (South Korea) Pyeongchang | 7 | 10 | 6 | N/A |
| 2022 | (China) Beijing | 1st place, gold medalist(s) | 2nd place, silver medalist(s) | 5 | 4 |
| 2026 | (Italy) Milano-Cortina | 8 | 6 | 6 | 3rd place, bronze medalist(s) |

=== FIS Nordic World Ski Championships ===
| Year | Place | Individual | | Team | |
| Year | Place | Normal | Large | Men | Mixed |
|---|---|---|---|---|---|
| 2017 | (Finland) Lahti | — | — | 7 | — |
| 2019 | (Austria) Seefeld | 14 | 4 | 3rd place, bronze medalist(s) | 5 |
| 2021 | (Germany) Oberstdorf | 12 | 34 | 4 | 5 |
| 2023 | (Slovenia) Planica | 30 | 2nd place, silver medalist(s) | 7 | 5 |
| 2025 | (Norway) Trondheim | 7 | 3rd place, bronze medalist(s) | 5 | 5 |

=== FIS Ski Flying World Championships ===
| Year | Place | Individual | Team |
|---|---|---|---|
| 2018 | (Germany) Oberstdorf | 16 | — |
| 2020 | (Slovenia) Planica | 19 | 5 |
| 2022 | (Norway) Vikersund | 13 | 6 |
| 2024 | (Austria) Bad Mitterndorf | 9 | 5 |
| 2026 | (Germany) Oberstdorf | 6 | 1st place, gold medalist(s) |

== World Cup ==
=== Standings ===
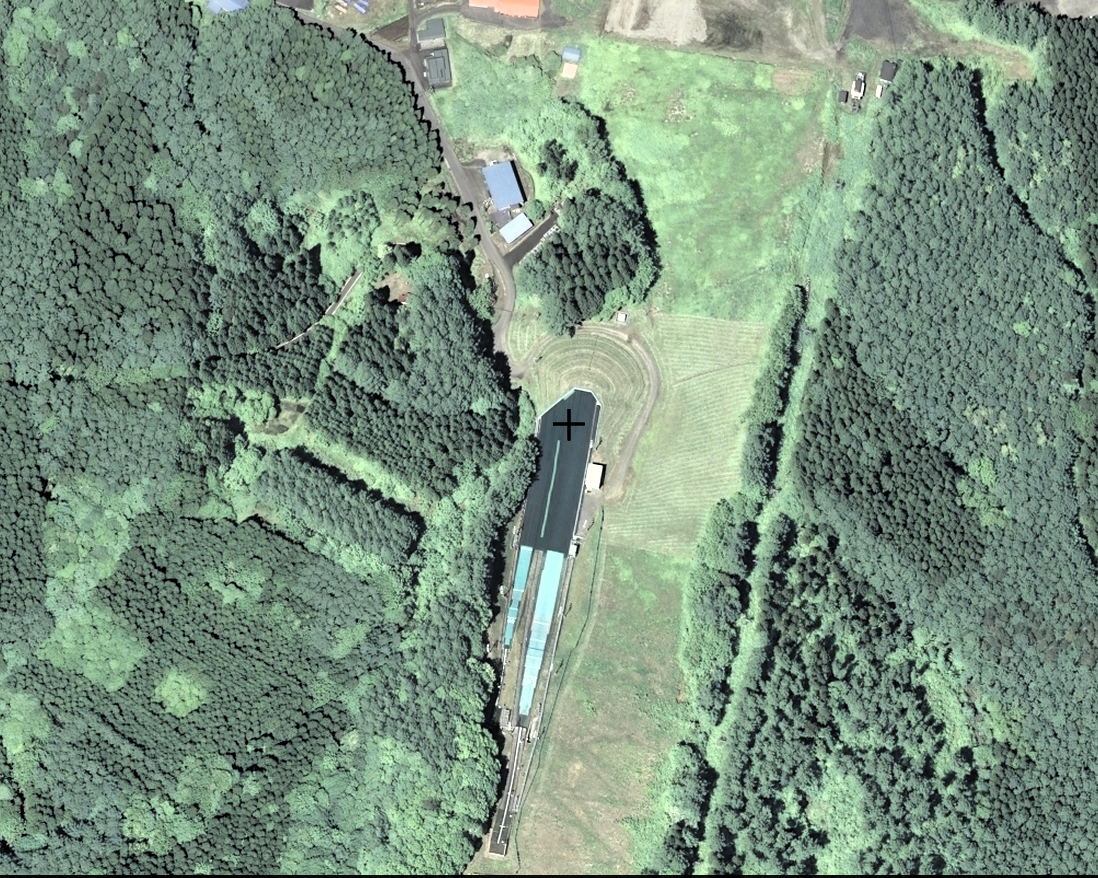
Tayama Jumping Hill in Hachimantai, where he made his first ski jumps

| Season | Overall | 4H | SF | RA | W6 | T5 | P7 |
|---|---|---|---|---|---|---|---|
| 2015/16 | 42 | — | 38 | N/A | N/A | N/A | N/A |
| 2016/17 | — | 43 | — | 39 | N/A | N/A | N/A |
| 2017/18 | 24 | 22 | 17 | 11 | — | N/A | 9 |
| 2018/19 | 1st place, gold medalist(s) | 1st place, gold medalist(s) | 1st place, gold medalist(s) | 1st place, gold medalist(s) | 1st place, gold medalist(s) | N/A | 1st place, gold medalist(s) |
| 2019/20 | 3rd place, bronze medalist(s) | 4 | 4 | 2nd place, silver medalist(s) | 6 | 1st place, gold medalist(s) | N/A |
| 2020/21 | 4 | 6 | 2nd place, silver medalist(s) | Cnx | 7 | N/A | 2nd place, silver medalist(s) |
| 2021/22 | 1st place, gold medalist(s) | 1st place, gold medalist(s) | 9 | 3rd place, bronze medalist(s) | N/A | N/A | 9 |
| 2022/23 | 5 | 18 | 8 | 4 | N/A | N/A | 9 |
| 2023/24 | 2nd place, silver medalist(s) | 1st place, gold medalist(s) | 6 | 12 | N/A | N/A | 5 |
| 2024/25 | 9 | 15 | 4 | 3rd place, bronze medalist(s) | N/A | N/A | 5 |
| 2025–26 | 2nd place, silver medalist(s) | 5 | 18 | N/A | N/A | N/A | 19 |

=== Individual wins ===
| No. | Season | Date | Location | Hill | Size |
|---|---|---|---|---|---|
| 1 | 2018/19 | 24 November 2018 | (Finland) Ruka | Rukatunturi HS142 | LH |
| 2 | 2018/19 | 25 November 2018 | (Finland) Ruka | Rukatunturi HS142 | LH |
| 3 | 2018/19 | 2 December 2018 | (Russia) Nizhny Tagil | Tramplin Stork HS134 | LH |
| 4 | 2018/19 | 16 December 2018 | (Switzerland) Engelberg | Gross-Titlis-Schanze HS140 | LH |
| 5 | 2018/19 | 30 December 2018 | (Germany) Oberstdorf | Schattenbergschanze HS137 | LH |
| 6 | 2018/19 | 1 January 2019 | (Germany) Garmisch-Partenkirchen | Große Olympiaschanze HS142 | LH |
| 7 | 2018/19 | 4 January 2019 | (Austria) Innsbruck | Bergiselschanze HS130 | LH |
| 8 | 2018/19 | 6 January 2019 | (Austria) Bischofshofen | Paul-Ausserleitner-Schanze HS142 | LH |
| 9 | 2018/19 | 12 January 2019 | (Italy) Val di Fiemme | Trampolino dal Ben HS135 | LH |
| 10 | 2018/19 | 2 February 2019 | (Germany) Oberstdorf | Heini-Klopfer-Skiflugschanze HS235 | FH |
| 11 | 2018/19 | 17 February 2019 | (Germany) Willingen | Mühlenkopfschanze HS145 | LH |
| 12 | 2018/19 | 14 March 2019 | (Norway) Trondheim | Granåsen HS138 (night) | LH |
| 13 | 2018/19 | 24 March 2019 | (Slovenia) Planica | Letalnica bratov Gorišek HS240 | FH |
| 14 | 2019/20 | 15 December 2019 | (Germany) Klingenthal | Vogtland Arena HS140 | LH |
| 15 | 2019/20 | 22 December 2019 | (Switzerland) Engelberg | Gross-Titlis-Schanze HS140 | LH |
| 16 | 2019/20 | 29 December 2019 | (Germany) Oberstdorf | Schattenbergschanze HS137 | LH |
| 17 | 2020/21 | 13 February 2021 | (Poland) Zakopane | Wielka Krokiew HS140 | LH |
| 18 | 2020/21 | 19 February 2021 | (Romania) Râșnov | Trambulina Valea Cărbunării HS97 | NH |
| 19 | 2020/21 | 25 March 2021 | (Slovenia) Planica | Letalnica bratov Gorišek HS240 | FH |
| 20 | 2021/22 | 27 November 2021 | (Finland) Ruka | Rukatunturi HS142 | LH |
| 21 | 2021/22 | 12 December 2021 | (Germany) Klingenthal | Vogtland Arena HS140 | LH |
| 22 | 2021/22 | 19 December 2021 | (Switzerland) Engelberg | Gross-Titlis-Schanze HS140 | LH |
| 23 | 2021/22 | 29 December 2021 | (Germany) Oberstdorf | Schattenbergschanze HS137 | LH |
| 24 | 2021/22 | 1 January 2022 | (Germany) Garmisch-Partenkirchen | Große Olympiaschanze HS142 | LH |
| 25 | 2021/22 | 5 January 2022 | (Austria) Bischofshofen | Paul-Ausserleitner-Schanze HS142 | LH |
| 26 | 2021/22 | 29 January 2022 | (Germany) Willingen | Mühlenkopfschanze HS147 | LH |
| 27 | 2021/22 | 27 February 2022 | (Finland) Lahti | Salpausselkä HS130 | LH |
| 28 | 2022/23 | 20 January 2023 | (Japan) Sapporo | Ōkurayama HS137 | LH |
| 29 | 2022/23 | 22 January 2023 | (Japan) Sapporo | Ōkurayama HS137 | LH |
| 30 | 2022/23 | 26 March 2023 | (Finland) Lahti | Salpausselkä HS130 | LH |
| 31 | 2023/24 | 14 January 2024 | (Poland) Wisła | Malinka HS134 | LH |
| 32 | 2023/24 | 12 March 2024 | (Norway) Trondheim | Granåsen HS105 | NH |
| 33 | 2024/25 | 15 February 2025 | (Japan) Sapporo | Ōkurayama HS137 | LH |
| 34 | 2024/25 | 16 February 2025 | (Japan) Sapporo | Ōkurayama HS137 | LH |
| 35 | 2024/25 | 13 March 2025 | (Norway) Oslo | Holmenkollbakken HS134 | LH |
| 36 | 2025/26 | 23 November 2025 | (Norway) Lillehammer | Lysgårdsbakken HS140 | LH |
| 37 | 2025/26 | 21 December 2025 | (Switzerland) Engelberg | Gross-Titlis-Schanze HS140 | LH |

=== Individual starts (245) ===
winner (1); second (2); third (3); did not compete (–); failed to qualify (q); disqualified in competition, disqualified in qualifications (dq)
| Season | 1 | 2 | 3 | 4 | 5 | 6 | 7 | 8 | 9 | 10 | 11 | 12 | 13 | 14 | 15 | 16 | 17 | 18 | 19 | 20 | 21 | 22 | 23 | 24 | 25 | 26 | 27 | 28 | 29 | 30 | 31 | 32 | Points |
| 2015/16 | Klingenthal | Lillehammer | Lillehammer | Nizhny Tagil | Nizhny Tagil | Engelberg | Engelberg | Oberstdorf | Garmisch-Partenkirchen | Innsbruck | Bischofshofen | Willingen | Zakopane | Sapporo | Sapporo | Trondheim | Vikersund | Vikersund | Vikersund | Lahti | Lahti | Kuopio | Almaty | Almaty | Wisła | Titisee-Neustadt | Planica | Planica | Planica | | | | 55 |
| 2015/16 | – | – | – | – | – | – | – | – | – | – | – | – | 7 | 20 | 36 | – | – | – | – | – | – | – | – | – | – | 44 | – | 23 | – | | | | 55 |
| 2016/17 | Kuusamo | Kuusamo | Klingenthal | Lillehammer | Lillehammer | Engelberg | Engelberg | Oberstdorf | Garmisch-Partenkirchen | Innsbruck | Bischofshofen | Wisła | Wisła | Zakopane | Willingen | Oberstdorf | Oberstdorf | Sapporo | Sapporo | Pyeongchang | Pyeongchang | Oslo | Trondheim | Vikersund | Planica | Planica | | | | | | | 0 |
| 2016/17 | 33 | 36 | q | q | 41 | q | q | 46 | 45 | q | 42 | 34 | q | 34 | 44 | 37 | 38 | 46 | q | 48 | 43 | 39 | 44 | q | 34 | – | | | | | | | 0 |
| 2017/18 | Wisła | Kuusamo | Nizhny Tagil | Nizhny Tagil | Titisee-Neustadt | Engelberg | Engelberg | Oberstdorf | Garmisch-Partenkirchen | Innsbruck | Bischofshofen | Tauplitz | Zakopane | Willingen | Willingen | Lahti | Oslo | Lillehammer | Trondheim | Vikersund | Planica | Planica | | | | | | | | | | | 187 |
| 2017/18 | 26 | dq | – | – | 49 | q | dq | 12 | 29 | 31 | 20 | 28 | 16 | – | – | 6 | 19 | 19 | 13 | 22 | 13 | 15 | | | | | | | | | | | 187 |
| 2018/19 | Wisła | Kuusamo | Kuusamo | Nizhny Tagil | Nizhny Tagil | Engelberg | Engelberg | Oberstdorf | Garmisch-Partenkirchen | Innsbruck | Bischofshofen | Val di Fiemme | Val di Fiemme | Zakopane | Sapporo | Sapporo | Oberstdorf | Oberstdorf | Oberstdorf | Lahti | Willingen | Willingen | Oslo | Lillehammer | Trondheim | Vikersund | Planica | Planica | | | | | 2085 |
| 2018/19 | 3 | 1 | 1 | 3 | 1 | 7 | 1 | 1 | 1 | 1 | 1 | 1 | 7 | 7 | 5 | 3 | 14 | 1 | 9 | 2 | 3 | 1 | 5 | 3 | 1 | 2 | 2 | 1 | | | | | 2085 |
| 2019/20 | Wisła | Kuusamo | Nizhny Tagil | Nizhny Tagil | Klingenthal | Engelberg | Engelberg | Oberstdorf | Garmisch-Partenkirchen | Innsbruck | Bischofshofen | Val di Fiemme | Val di Fiemme | Titisee-Neustadt | Titisee-Neustadt | Zakopane | Sapporo | Sapporo | Willingen | Tauplitz | Tauplitz | Râșnov | Râșnov | Lahti | Lahti | Lillehammer | Lillehammer | | | | | | 1178 |
| 2019/20 | 4 | 6 | 6 | 3 | 1 | 4 | 1 | 1 | 4 | 14 | 7 | 26 | 25 | 3 | 2 | 7 | 15 | 3 | 9 | 9 | 2 | – | – | 14 | 7 | 9 | 4 | | | | | | 1178 |
| 2020/21 | Wisła | Ruka | Ruka | Nizhny Tagil | Nizhny Tagil | Engelberg | Engelberg | Oberstdorf | Garmisch-Partenkirchen | Innsbruck | Bischofshofen | Titisee-Neustadt | Titisee-Neustadt | Zakopane | Lahti | Willingen | Willingen | Klingenthal | Klingenthal | Szczyrk | Szczyrk | Râșnov | Planica | Planica | Planica | | | | | | | | 919 |
| 2020/21 | 27 | 38 | 15 | 12 | 15 | 13 | 16 | 14 | 7 | 7 | 14 | 10 | 7 | 6 | 9 | 7 | 14 | 11 | 13 | 1 | 9 | 1 | 1 | 2 | 2 | | | | | | | | 919 |
| 2021/22 | Nizhny Tagil | Nizhny Tagil | Ruka | Ruka | Wisła | Klingenthal | Klingenthal | Engelberg | Engelberg | Oberstdorf | Garmisch-Partenkirchen | Bischofshofen | Bischofshofen | Bischofshofen | Zakopane | Titisee-Neustadt | Titisee-Neustadt | Willingen | Willingen | Lahti | Lahti | Lillehammer | Oslo | Oslo | Oberstdorf | Oberstdorf | Planica | Planica | | | | | 1621 |
| 2021/22 | 2 | dq | 1 | – | – | 7 | 1 | 2 | 1 | 1 | 1 | 1 | 5 | 4 | 4 | 5 | 4 | 1 | 4 | 7 | 1 | 2 | 6 | 7 | 10 | 6 | 5 | 8 | | | | | 1621 |
| 2022/23 | Wisła | Wisła | Kuusamo | Kuusamo | Titisee-Neustadt | Titisee-Neustadt | Engelberg | Engelberg | Oberstdorf | Garmisch-Partenkirchen | Innsbruck | Bischofshofen | Zakopane | Sapporo | Sapporo | Sapporo | Tauplitz | Tauplitz | Willingen | Willingen | Lake Placid | Lake Placid | Râșnov | Oslo | Oslo | Lillehammer | Lillehammer | Vikersund | Vikersund | Lahti | Planica | Planica | 1065 |
| 2022/23 | 7 | 30 | 31 | 23 | 10 | 12 | 10 | 31 | 15 | 19 | 32 | 17 | – | 1 | 3 | 1 | 14 | 13 | 6 | 2 | 2 | 5 | – | 6 | 14 | 8 | 5 | 4 | 12 | 1 | 12 | 8 | 1065 |
| 2023/24 | Kuusamo | Kuusamo | Lillehammer | Lillehammer | Klingenthal | Klingenthal | Engelberg | Engelberg | Oberstdorf | Garmisch-Partenkirchen | Innsbruck | Bischofshofen | Wisła | Zakopane | Willingen | Willingen | Lake Placid | Lake Placid | Sapporo | Sapporo | Oberstdorf | Oberstdorf | Lahti | Lahti | Oslo | Oslo | Trondheim | Trondheim | Vikersund | Vikersund | Planica | Planica | 1673 |
| 2023/24 | 6 | 13 | 12 | 5 | 3 | 7 | 12 | 10 | 2 | 2 | 2 | 2 | 1 | 5 | 2 | 2 | 2 | 5 | 2 | 2 | 7 | 3 | 3 | 5 | 38 | 2 | 1 | 14 | 9 | 11 | 9 | 20 | 1673 |
| 2024/25 | Lillehammer | Lillehammer | Ruka | Ruka | Wisła | Wisła | Titisee-Neustadt | Titisee-Neustadt | Engelberg | Engelberg | Oberstdorf | Garmisch-Partenkirchen | Innsbruck | Bischofshofen | Zakopane | Oberstdorf | Oberstdorf | Willingen | Willingen | Lake Placid | Lake Placid | Sapporo | Sapporo | Oslo | Vikersund | Vikersund | Lahti | Planica | Planica | | | | 910 |
| 2024/25 | 16 | 17 | 16 | 24 | 23 | 13 | 17 | 16 | 13 | 12 | 18 | 28 | 20 | 24 | – | 5 | 13 | 7 | 7 | q | 5 | 1 | 1 | 1 | 4 | 3 | 9 | 3 | 5 | | | | 910 |
| 2025/26 | Lillehammer | Lillehammer | Falun | Falun | Ruka | Wisła | Wisła | Klingenthal | Klingenthal | Engelberg | Engelberg | Oberstdorf | Garmisch-Partenkirchen | Innsbruck | Bischofshofen | Zakopane | Sapporo | Sapporo | Willingen | Willingen | Bad Mitterndorf | Bad Mitterndorf | Lahti | Lahti | Oslo | Oslo | Vikersund | Planica | Planica | | | | 1194 |
| 2025/26 | 5 | 1 | 7 | 6 | 5 | 3 | 2 | 5 | 3 | 6 | 1 | 6 | 5 | 10 | 3 | - | 5 | 2 | 9 | 18 | 8 | 8 | 6 | 3 | 13 | 32 | dq | 16 | 25 | | | | 1194 |
