= Timi Zajc =

Slovenian ski jumper (born 2000)

- Zajc in 2025

Personal information
- Born: 26 April 2000 (age 26) Ljubljana, Slovenia
- Height: 1.70 m (5 ft 7 in)

Sport
- Sport: Ski jumping
- Club: SSK Ljubno BTC

World Cup career
- Seasons: 2018–present
- Indiv. starts: 212
- Indiv. podiums: 15
- Indiv. wins: 5
- Team starts: 38
- Team podiums: 20
- Team wins: 6

Achievements and titles
- Personal bests: 245 m (804 ft); Vikersund, 12 March 2022
Medal record
Representing Slovenia
Men's ski jumping
Olympic Games
Gold medal – first place	2022 Beijing	Mixed team
Silver medal – second place	2022 Beijing	Team LH
World Championships
Gold medal – first place	2023 Planica	Individual LH
Gold medal – first place	2023 Planica	Team LH
Gold medal – first place	2025 Trondheim	Team LH
Bronze medal – third place	2023 Planica	Mixed team NH
European Games
Bronze medal – third place	2023 Kraków-Małopolska	Mixed team
Men's ski flying
World Championships
Gold medal – first place	2022 Vikersund	Team
Gold medal – first place	2024 Bad Mitterndorf	Team
Silver medal – second place	2022 Vikersund	Individual
Bronze medal – third place	2024 Bad Mitterndorf	Individual
- Updated on 22 November 2026

Timi Zajc (born 26 April 2000) is a Slovenian ski jumper.

== Career ==
=== Continental Cup ===
In September 2017 in Trondheim, Zajc finished on the podium for the first time in his career after finishing third in the first competition and winning the second competition.

=== World Cup debut ===
He made his World Cup debut at the 2017–18 season opening in Wisła, competing in the qualifying round of the individual event.

== Major tournament results ==
=== Winter Olympics ===
Year	Individual		Team		
Year	Normal	Large	Men	Super	Mixed
(South Korea) 2018 Pyeongchang	33	—	—	N/A	N/A
(China) 2022 Beijing	9	6	2nd place, silver medalist(s)	N/A	1st place, gold medalist(s)
(Italy) 2026 Milano Cortina	21	34	N/A	—	—

=== FIS Nordic World Ski Championships ===
Year	Individual		Team	
Year	Normal	Large	Men	Mixed
(Austria) 2019 Seefeld	50	10	6	—
(Slovenia) 2023 Planica	10	1st place, gold medalist(s)	1st place, gold medalist(s)	3rd place, bronze medalist(s)
(Norway) 2025 Trondheim	37	45	1st place, gold medalist(s)	—

=== FIS Ski Flying World Championships ===
Year	Individual	Team
(Slovenia) 2020 Planica	30	—
(Norway) 2022 Vikersund	2nd place, silver medalist(s)	1st place, gold medalist(s)
(Austria) 2024 Bad Mitterndorf	3rd place, bronze medalist(s)	1st place, gold medalist(s)
(Germany) 2026 Oberstdorf	20	6

== World Cup results ==
=== Standings ===
Season	Overall	4H	SF	RA
2017–18	32	16	—	47
2018–19	9	20	6	16
2019–20	14	23	2nd place, silver medalist(s)	9
2020–21	46	—	40	N/A
2021–22	8	23	2nd place, silver medalist(s)	15
2022–23	8	14	4	6
2023–24	16	10	4	4
2024–25	16	25	5	6
2025–26	27	—	24	N/A

=== Individual wins ===
No.	Season	Date	Location	Hill	Size
1	2018–19	1 February 2019	(Germany) Oberstdorf	Heini-Klopfer-Skiflugschanze HS235	FH
2	2021–22	20 March 2022	(Germany) Oberstdorf	Heini-Klopfer-Skiflugschanze HS235	FH
3	2022–23	2 April 2023	(Slovenia) Planica	Letalnica bratov Gorišek HS240	FH
4	2023–24	24 February 2024	(Germany) Oberstdorf	Heini-Klopfer-Skiflugschanze HS235	FH
5	2024–25	25 January 2025	(Germany) Oberstdorf	Heini-Klopfer-Skiflugschanze HS235	FH

=== Individual starts ===
winner (1); second (2); third (3); did not compete (–); failed to qualify (q); disqualified (DQ)
Season	1	2	3	4	5	6	7	8	9	10	11	12	13	14	15	16	17	18	19	20	21	22	23	24	25	26	27	28	29	30	31	32	Points
2017–18	Wisła	Ruka	Nizhny Tagil	Nizhny Tagil	Titisee-Neustadt	Engelberg	Engelberg	Oberstdorf	Garmisch-Partenkirchen	Innsbruck	Bischofshofen	Tauplitz	Zakopane	Willingen	Willingen	Lahti	Oslo	Lillehammer	Trondheim	Vikersund	Planica	Planica											88
2017–18	DQ	–	12	22	q	24	–	26	22	17	27	–	47	17	41	–	43	35	27	–	–	–											88
2018–19	Wisła	Ruka	Ruka	Nizhny Tagil	Nizhny Tagil	Engelberg	Engelberg	Oberstdorf	Garmisch-Partenkirchen	Innsbruck	Bischofshofen	Val di Fiemme	Val di Fiemme	Zakopane	Sapporo	Sapporo	Oberstdorf	Oberstdorf	Oberstdorf	Lahti	Willingen	Willingen	Oslo	Lillehammer	Trondheim	Vikersund	Planica	Planica					833
2018–19	5	7	11	8	24	12	18	9	8	10	43	12	21	7	6	2	1	9	13	–	9	8	14	39	4	25	4	5					833
2019–20	Wisła	Ruka	Nizhny Tagil	Nizhny Tagil	Klingenthal	Engelberg	Engelberg	Oberstdorf	Garmisch-Partenkirchen	Innsbruck	Bischofshofen	Val di Fiemme	Val di Fiemme	Titisee-Neustadt	Titisee-Neustadt	Zakopane	Sapporo	Sapporo	Willingen	Tauplitz	Tauplitz	Râșnov	Râșnov	Lahti	Lahti	Lillehammer	Lillehammer						544
2019–20	6	8	q	10	42	31	57	24	18	20	40	29	32	10	3	26	17	7	13	2	3	–	–	7	24	22	3						544
2020–21	Wisła	Ruka	Ruka	Nizhny Tagil	Nizhny Tagil	Engelberg	Engelberg	Oberstdorf	Garmisch-Partenkirchen	Innsbruck	Bischofshofen	Titisee-Neustadt	Titisee-Neustadt	Zakopane	Lahti	Willingen	Willingen	Klingenthal	Klingenthal	Szczyrk	Szczyrk	Râșnov	Planica	Planica	Planica								60
2020–21	23	q	39	22	10	–	–	–	–	–	–	–	–	–	–	42	43	36	29	18	35	–	29	35	–								60
2021–22	Nizhny Tagil	Nizhny Tagil	Ruka	Ruka	Wisła	Klingenthal	Klingenthal	Engelberg	Engelberg	Oberstdorf	Garmisch-Partenkirchen	Bischofshofen	Bischofshofen	Bischofshofen	Zakopane	Titisee-Neustadt	Titisee-Neustadt	Willingen	Willingen	Lahti	Lahti	Lillehammer	Oslo	Oslo	Oberstdorf	Oberstdorf	Planica	Planica					711
2021–22	q	4	9	20	16	19	48	3	17	q	9	14	16	20	9	18	6	36	9	20	24	17	13	11	3	1	4	4					711
2022–23	Wisła	Wisła	Ruka	Ruka	Titisee-Neustadt	Titisee-Neustadt	Engelberg	Engelberg	Oberstdorf	Garmisch-Partenkirchen	Innsbruck	Bischofshofen	Zakopane	Sapporo	Sapporo	Sapporo	Tauplitz	Tauplitz	Willingen	Willingen	Lake Placid	Lake Placid	Râșnov	Oslo	Oslo	Lillehammer	Lillehammer	Vikersund	Vikersund	Lahti	Planica	Planica	853
2022–23	20	10	22	22	12	32	9	33	18	14	11	9	37	7	12	10	6	2	12	10	4	6	–	12	10	10	13	16	7	7	6	1	853
2023–24	Ruka	Ruka	Lillehammer	Lillehammer	Klingenthal	Klingenthal	Engelberg	Engelberg	Oberstdorf	Garmisch-Partenkirchen	Innsbruck	Bischofshofen	Wisła	Zakopane	Willingen	Willingen	Lake Placid, New York	Lake Placid, New York	Sapporo	Sapporo	Oberstdorf	Oberstdorf	Lahti	Lahti	Oslo	Oslo	Trondheim	Trondheim	Vikersund	Vikersund	Planica	Planica	640
2023–24	8	8	18	15	18	17	9	31	14	11	10	22	DQ	–	47	7	39	20	31	DQ	1	4	–	–	7	20	21	17	7	3	4	–	640
2024–25	Lillehammer	Lillehammer	Ruka	Ruka	Wisła	Wisła	Titisee-Neustadt	Titisee-Neustadt	Engelberg	Engelberg	Oberstdorf	Garmisch-Partenkirchen	Innsbruck	Bischofshofen	Zakopane	Oberstdorf	Oberstdorf	Willingen	Willingen	Lake Placid	Lake Placid	Sapporo	Sapporo	Oslo	Vikersund	Vikersund	Lahti	Planica	Planica				572
2024–25	44	16	9	39	20	5	5	27	28	10	25	47	17	26	14	1	12	13	16	–	–	39	10	21	2	13	19	12	11				572
