= Marius Lindvik =

Norwegian ski jumper (born 1998)

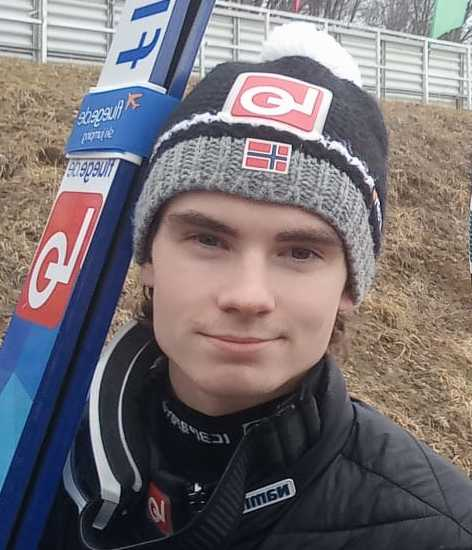

Personal information
- Nationality: Norway
- Born: 27 June 1998 (age 28) Sørum, Norway
- Height: 1.75 m (5 ft 9 in)

Sport
- Sport: Skiing
- Club: Rælingen SK

World Cup career
- Seasons: 2016–present
- Indiv. starts: 172
- Indiv. podiums: 24
- Indiv. wins: 8
- Team starts: 26
- Team podiums: 15
- Team wins: 5

Achievements and titles
- Personal bests: 245.5 m (805 ft); Planica, 27 March 2022
Medal record
Representing Norway
Men's ski jumping
Olympic Games
Gold medal – first place	2022 Beijing	Individual LH
Silver medal – second place	2026 Milano Cortina	Mixed team
World Championships
Gold medal – first place	2025 Trondheim	Individual NH
Gold medal – first place	2025 Trondheim	Mixed team LH
Silver medal – second place	2023 Planica	Team LH
Bronze medal – third place	2025 Trondheim	Team LH
European Games
Silver medal – second place	2023 Kraków–Małopolska	Mixed team NH
Men's ski flying
World Championships
Gold medal – first place	2022 Vikersund	Individual
Silver medal – second place	2026 Oberstdorf	Individual
Bronze medal – third place	2022 Vikersund	Team
Bronze medal – third place	2026 Oberstdorf	Team
- Updated on 16 February 2025

Marius Lindvik (born 27 June 1998) is a Norwegian ski jumper and Olympic gold medalist.

== Career ==
He represents the sports club Rælingen SK. He hails from Frogner i Sørum.

He won the silver medal in the normal hill at the 2016 Winter Youth Olympics. He competed at the Junior World Championships in 2016, 2017 and 2018 with a team bronze (2018), a team silver (2016), a mixed team gold (2018) as well as the individual gold (2018).

He made his Continental Cup debut on the summer circuit in September 2015 in Oslo, recording his first podium in December 2017 in Vancouver and his first victory in January 2018 in Titisee-Neustadt. He won the winter circuit of the 2017–18 FIS Ski Jumping Continental Cup.

He made his FIS Ski Jumping World Cup debut in December 2015 in Lysgårdsbakken, recording a 32nd place, but did not have another outing before January 2018 in Zakopane where he also collected his first World Cup points with an 8th place, as well as a third place in the team competition.

He won a gold medal in the Ski jumping at the 2022 Winter Olympics – Men's large hill individual competition.

He lost his silver medal in the FIS Nordic World Ski Championships 2025 in Trondheim due to manipulation of his ski jump suit. The incident created an international scandal in the press.

== World Cup ==
=== Standings ===
Season				Tour Standings			
Season	Overall	4H	SF	RA	W6	T5	P7
2015/16	—	—	—	N/A	N/A	N/A	N/A
2016/17	—	—	—	—	N/A	N/A	N/A
2017/18	41	—	—	30	—	N/A	35
2018/19	44	—	39	23	38	N/A	40
2019/20	7	2nd place, silver medalist(s)	11	3rd place, bronze medalist(s)	3rd place, bronze medalist(s)	12	N/A
2020/21	10	36	—	Cnx	7	N/A	35
2021/22	3rd place, bronze medalist(s)	2nd place, silver medalist(s)	6	14	N/A	N/A	2nd place, silver medalist(s)
2022/23	20	25	23	38	N/A	N/A	—
2023/24	8	9	12	21	N/A	N/A	11

=== Individual wins ===
No.	Season	Date	Location	Hill	Size
1	2019/20	1 January 2020	(Germany) Garmisch-Partenkirchen	Große Olympiaschanze HS142	LH
2	2019/20	4 January 2020	(Austria) Innsbruck	Bergiselschanze HS130	LH
3	2020/21	17 January 2021	(Poland) Zakopane	Wielka Krokiew HS140 (night)	LH
4	2021/22	8 January 2022	(Austria) Bischofshofen	Paul-Ausserleitner HS140 (night)	LH
5	2021/22	16 January 2022	(Poland) Zakopane	Wielka Krokiew HS140 (night)	LH
6	2021/22	30 January 2022	(Germany) Willingen	Mühlenkopfschanze HS147 (night)	LH
7	2021/22	5 March 2022	(Norway) Oslo	Holmenkollbakken HS134	LH
8	2021/22	27 March 2022	(Slovenia) Planica	Letalnica bratov Gorišek HS240	FH
