= Naoki Nakamura =

Japanese ski jumper (born 1996)

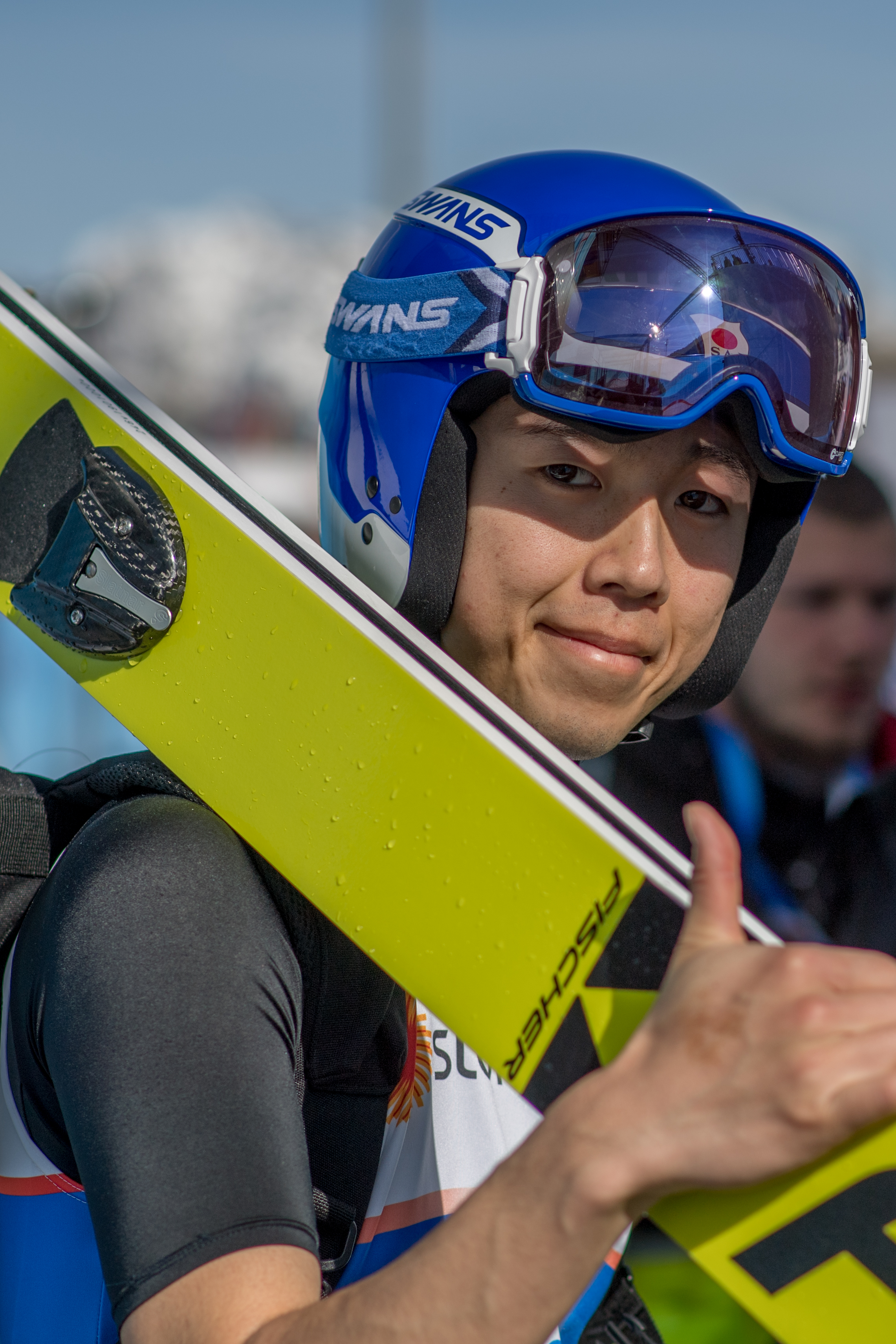
- Nakamura in 2019

Personal information
- Nationality: Japan
- Born: 19 September 1996 (age 29) Rumoi, Japan
- Height: 1.75 m (5 ft 9 in)

Sport
- Sport: Skiing
- Club: Flying Laboratory Ski Club

World Cup career
- Indiv. starts: 170
- Indiv. podiums: 1
- Team starts: 16
- Team podiums: 3 (1 teamLH 1 teamFH 1 superteamLH)

Achievements and titles
- Personal bests: 237.0 m (777.6 ft); Planica, 2 April 2023
Medal record
Men's ski flying
World Championships
Gold medal – first place	2026 Oberstdorf	Team
- Updated on 7 January 2026

Naoki Nakamura (中村直幹, Nakamura Naoki; born 19 September 1996 in Rumoi) is a Japanese ski jumper. Team bronze medalist at the 2016 Nordic Junior World Ski Championships.

His younger sister, Anju Nakamura, competes in the Nordic Combined. His best individual result so far is 3rd place in the competition in Ruka in the season 2022–23.

== Major tournament results ==
=== Winter Olympics ===
Year	Place	Individual		Team	
Year	Place	Normal	Large	Men	Mixed
2022	(China) Beijing	38	29	5	—

=== FIS World Nordic Ski Championships ===
Year	Place	NH	LH	Team LH	Mixed NH
2021	(Germany) Oberstdorf	—	—	4	—
2023	(Slovenia) Planica	25	29	7	5
2025	(Norway) Trondheim	11	25	5	—

=== Ski Flying World Championships ===
Year	Place	Individual	Team
2020	(Slovenia) Planica	35	5
2022	(Norway) Vikersund	37	6
2024	(Austria) Bad Mitterndorf	34	5

== World Cup ==
=== Standings ===
Season	Overall	4H	SF	RA	W6	T5	P7
2015/16	67	—	—	N/A	N/A	N/A	N/A
2016/17	—	—	—	—	N/A	N/A	N/A
2017/18	69	—	—	—	32	N/A	N/A
2018/19	39	32	42	31	53	N/A	32
2019/20	43	33	—	44	43	34	N/A
2020/21	34	41	17	—	25	N/A	30
2021/22	31	28	31	43	N/A	N/A	40
2022/23	24	35	19	26	N/A	N/A	16
2023/24	56	—	—	—	N/A	N/A	—
2024/25	25	19	17	17	N/A	N/A	17

=== Individual starts (170) ===
winner (1); second (2); third (3); did not compete (–); failed to qualify (q); disqualified (DQ)
Season	1	2	3	4	5	6	7	8	9	10	11	12	13	14	15	16	17	18	19	20	21	22	23	24	25	26	27	28	29	30	31	32	Points
2015/16	Klingenthal	Lillehammer	Lillehammer	Nizhny Tagil	Nizhny Tagil	Engelberg	Engelberg	Oberstdorf	Garmisch-Partenkirchen	Innsbruck	Bischofshofen	Willingen	Zakopane	Sapporo	Sapporo	Trondheim	Vikersund	Vikersund	Vikersund	Lahti	Lahti	Kuopio	Almaty	Almaty	Wisła	Titisee-Neustadt	Planica	Planica	Planica				6
2015/16	–	–	–	–	–	–	–	–	–	–	–	–	–	38	25	–	–	–	–	–	–	–	–	–	–	–	–	–	–				6
2016/17	Kuusamo	Kuusamo	Klingenthal	Lillehammer	Lillehammer	Engelberg	Engelberg	Oberstdorf	Garmisch-Partenkirchen	Innsbruck	Bischofshofen	Wisła	Wisła	Zakopane	Willingen	Oberstdorf	Oberstdorf	Sapporo	Sapporo	Pyeongchang	Pyeongchang	Oslo	Trondheim	Vikersund	Planica	Planica							0
2016/17	–	–	–	–	–	–	–	–	–	–	–	–	–	–	–	–	–	39	46	–	–	–	–	–	–	–							0
2017/18	Wisła	Kuusamo	Nizhny Tagil	Nizhny Tagil	Titisee-Neustadt	Engelberg	Engelberg	Oberstdorf	Garmisch-Partenkirchen	Innsbruck	Bischofshofen	Tauplitz	Zakopane	Willingen	Willingen	Lahti	Oslo	Lillehammer	Trondheim	Vikersund	Planica	Planica											2
2017/18	–	–	q	31	–	–	–	–	–	–	–	–	–	45	29	–	–	–	–	–	–	–											2
2018/19	Wisła	Kuusamo	Kuusamo	Nizhny Tagil	Nizhny Tagil	Engelberg	Engelberg	Oberstdorf	Garmisch-Partenkirchen	Innsbruck	Bischofshofen	Val di Fiemme	Val di Fiemme	Zakopane	Sapporo	Sapporo	Oberstdorf	Oberstdorf	Oberstdorf	Lahti	Willingen	Willingen	Oslo	Lillehammer	Trondheim	Vikersund	Planica	Planica					72
2018/19	44	28	23	27	18	42	14	29	26	31	34	36	45	q	36	20	38	36	38	47	q	q	q	49	28	29	28	–					72
2019/20	Wisła	Kuusamo	Nizhny Tagil	Nizhny Tagil	Klingenthal	Engelberg	Engelberg	Oberstdorf	Garmisch-Partenkirchen	Innsbruck	Bischofshofen	Val di Fiemme	Val di Fiemme	Titisee-Neustadt	Titisee-Neustadt	Zakopane	Sapporo	Sapporo	Willingen	Tauplitz	Tauplitz	Râșnov	Râșnov	Lahti	Lahti	Lillehammer	Lillehammer						39
2019/20	13	43	36	49	16	–	–	31	36	28	36	34	43	33	30	q	37	39	44	43	35	–	–	–	43	44	39						39
2020/21	Wisła	Ruka	Ruka	Nizhny Tagil	Nizhny Tagil	Engelberg	Engelberg	Oberstdorf	Garmisch-Partenkirchen	Innsbruck	Bischofshofen	Titisee-Neustadt	Titisee-Neustadt	Zakopane	Lahti	Willingen	Willingen	Klingenthal	Klingenthal	Szczyrk	Szczyrk	Râșnov	Planica	Planica	Planica								111
2020/21	q	q	16	29	37	33	31	20	32	q	34	48	22	–	–	26	25	26	23	28	18	26	16	17	–								111
2021/22	Nizhny Tagil	Nizhny Tagil	Ruka	Ruka	Wisła	Klingenthal	Klingenthal	Engelberg	Engelberg	Oberstdorf	Garmisch-Partenkirchen	Bischofshofen	Bischofshofen	Bischofshofen	Zakopane	Titisee-Neustadt	Titisee-Neustadt	Willingen	Willingen	Lahti	Lahti	Lillehammer	Oslo	Oslo	Oberstdorf	Oberstdorf	Planica	Planica					196
2021/22	4	19	14	–	20	15	20	22	22	20	21	31	39	q	32	26	25	32	18	33	–	44	46	43	21	–	q	26					196
2022/23	Wisła	Wisła	Kuusamo	Kuusamo	Titisee-Neustadt	Titisee-Neustadt	Engelberg	Engelberg	Oberstdorf	Garmisch-Partenkirchen	Innsbruck	Bischofshofen	Zakopane	Sapporo	Sapporo	Sapporo	Tauplitz	Tauplitz	Willingen	Willingen	Lake Placid	Lake Placid	Râșnov	Oslo	Oslo	Lillehammer	Lillehammer	Vikersund	Vikersund	Lahti	Planica	Planica	275
2022/23	30	11	34	3	19	26	21	36	40	36	25	47	–	30	q	42	q	18	18	16	11	43	–	20	q	32	38	11	23	44	19	7	275
2023/24	Kuusamo	Kuusamo	Lillehammer	Lillehammer	Klingenthal	Klingenthal	Engelberg	Engelberg	Oberstdorf	Garmisch-Partenkirchen	Innsbruck	Bischofshofen	Wisła	Zakopane	Willingen	Willingen	Lake Placid	Lake Placid	Sapporo	Sapporo	Oberstdorf	Oberstdorf	Lahti	Lahti	Oslo	Oslo	Trondheim	Trondheim	Vikersund	Vikersund	Planica	Planica	15
2023/24	q	33	q	q	q	–	–	–	q	45	q	q	q	q	27	30	26	26	44	–	–	–	–	–	–	–	–	–	–	–	–	–	15
2024/25	Lillehammer	Lillehammer	Ruka	Ruka	Wisła	Wisła	Titisee-Neustadt	Titisee-Neustadt	Engelberg	Engelberg	Oberstdorf	Garmisch-Partenkirchen	Innsbruck	Bischofshofen	Zakopane	Oberstdorf	Oberstdorf	Willingen	Willingen	Lake Placid	Lake Placid	Sapporo	Sapporo	Oslo	Vikersund	Vikersund	Lahti	Planica	Planica				212
2024/25	43	44	30	22	29	44	32	35	36	42	17	12	21	31	27	9	16	DQ	27	39	48	10	15	14	22	20	33	15	25				212
2025/26	Lillehammer	Lillehammer	Falun	Falun	Ruka	Wisła	Wisła	Klingenthal	Klingenthal	Engelberg	Engelberg	Oberstdorf	Garmisch-Partenkirchen	Innsbruck	Bischofshofen	Zakopane	Sapporo	Sapporo	Willingen	Willingen	Bad Mitterndorf	Bad Mitterndorf	Lahti	Oslo	Oslo	Vikersund	Vikersund	Planica	Planica				215
2025/26	28	11	14	17	48	9	11	14	17	35	11	15	15	16	47																		215
