= Alex Insam =

Italian ski jumper (born 1997)

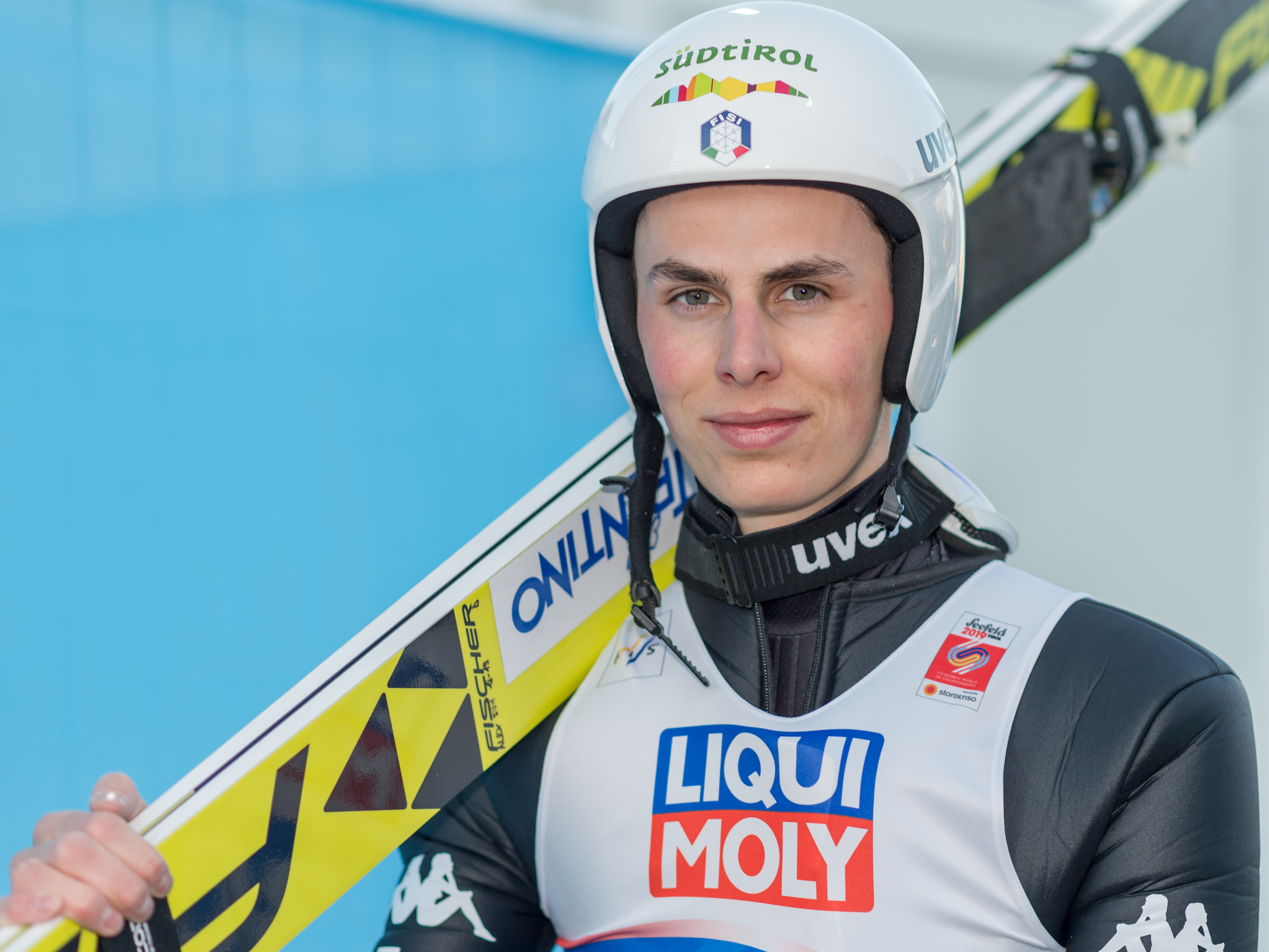
- Insam in 2019

Personal information
- Full name: Alex Insam
- Nationality: Italian
- Born: 19 December 1997 (age 28) Brixen, South Tyrol, Italy
- Height: 1.85 m (6 ft 1 in)

Sport
- Sport: Ski jumping
- Club: Fiamme Oro

Alex Insam (born 19 December 1997) is an Italian ski jumper. He competed in two events at the 2018 Winter Olympics.

His older sister Evelyn also competed in ski jumping.
