= 2016–17 FIS Ski Flying World Cup =

FIS Ski Flying World Cup 2016/17
Winners
- Overall: (Austria) Stefan Kraft

Competitions
- Venues: 3
- Individual: 5
- Team: 2

The 2016–17 FIS Ski Flying World Cup was the 20th official World Cup season in ski flying. The winner was awarded with small crystal globe as the subdiscipline of FIS Ski Jumping World Cup.

== Map of World Cup hosts ==
(Germany) Oberstdorf	(Norway) Vikersund	(Slovenia) Planica
Heini-Klopfer	Vikersundbakken	Letalnica bratov Gorišek
Europe

== World records ==
List of world record distances achieved within this World Cup season.

Date	Athlete	Hill	Round	Place	Metres	Feet
18 March 2017	(Norway) Robert Johansson	Vikersundbakken HS225	Team – R1	Vikersund, Norway	252	827
18 March 2017	(Austria) Stefan Kraft	Vikersundbakken HS225	Team – R1	Vikersund, Norway	253.5	832

== Calendar ==
=== Men's Individual ===
All	No.	Date	Place (Hill)	Size	Winner	Second	Third	Ski flying leader	R.
915	1	4 February 2017	(Germany) Oberstdorf (Heini-Klopfer HS225)	F _{111}	(Austria) Stefan Kraft	(Germany) Andreas Wellinger	(Poland) Kamil Stoch	(Austria) Stefan Kraft	
916	2	(Note: Second round of ski flying event in Oberstdorf (5 February) was canceled. Only one round counted.)5 February 2017	(Germany) Oberstdorf (Heini-Klopfer HS225)	F _{112}	(Austria) Stefan Kraft	(Germany) Andreas Wellinger	(Slovenia) Jurij Tepeš	(Austria) Stefan Kraft	
		(Note: Canceled individual event from Lillehammer (14 December) was rescheduled to a ski flying hill in Vikersund (17 March) as a one-round only event.)17 March 2017	(Norway) Vikersund (Vikersundbakken HS225)	F _{cnx}	one-round substitute competition cancelled due to strong (replaced with originally scheduled prologue/qualifications)			—	
prologue		17 March 2017	(Norway) Vikersund (Vikersundbakken HS225)	F _{Qro}	originally scheduled prologue planned to be moved on 18 March (but as Lillehammer substitute event cancelled returned to original date)			—	
prologue		17 March 2017	(Norway) Vikersund (Vikersundbakken HS225)	F _{Qro}	(Poland) Kamil Stoch	(Germany) Andreas Wellinger	(Slovenia) Domen Prevc	—	
prologue		18 March 2017	(Norway) Vikersund (Vikersundbakken HS225)	F _{Qro}	rescheduled prologue returned to original date on 17 March (as then rescheduled Lillehammer got cancelled)			—	
team		18 March 2017	(Norway) Vikersund (Vikersundbakken HS225)	F _{T}	(Austria) Stefan Kraft	(Poland) Kamil Stoch	(Germany) Andreas Wellinger	—	
923	3	19 March 2017	(Norway) Vikersund (Vikersundbakken HS225)	F _{113}	(Poland) Kamil Stoch	(Japan) Noriaki Kasai	(Austria) Michael Hayböck	(Austria) Stefan Kraft	
924	4	24 March 2017	(Slovenia) Planica (Letalnica b. Gorišek HS225)	F _{114}	(Austria) Stefan Kraft	(Germany) Andreas Wellinger	(Germany) Markus Eisenbichler	(Austria) Stefan Kraft	
925	5	(Note: Final round of the event in Planica (26 March) was cancelled due to strong wind. Only one round counted.)26 March 2017	(Slovenia) Planica (Letalnica b. Gorišek HS225)	F _{115}	(Austria) Stefan Kraft	(Germany) Andreas Wellinger	(Japan) Noriaki Kasai	(Austria) Stefan Kraft	
20th FIS Ski Flying Men's Overall (4 February – 26 March 2017)					(Austria) Stefan Kraft	(Germany) Andreas Wellinger	(Poland) Kamil Stoch	Ski Flying Overall	

=== Men's team ===
All	No.	Date	Place (Hill)	Size	Winner	Second	Third	R.
86	1	18 March 2017	(Norway) Vikersund (Vikersundbakken HS225)	F _{018}	Norway Daniel-André Tande; Robert Johansson; Johann André Forfang; Andreas Stjernen	Poland Piotr Żyła; Dawid Kubacki; Maciej Kot; Kamil Stoch	Austria Michael Hayböck; Manuel Fettner; Gregor Schlierenzauer; Stefan Kraft	
87	2	25 March 2017	(Slovenia) Planica (Letalnica bratov Gorišek HS225)	F _{019}	Norway Robert Johansson; Johann André Forfang; Anders Fannemel; Andreas Stjernen	Germany Markus Eisenbichler; Richard Freitag; Karl Geiger; Andreas Wellinger	Poland Piotr Żyła; Dawid Kubacki; Maciej Kot; Kamil Stoch	

Raw Air 2017 (part of)

== Standings ==
=== Ski Flying ===
Rank	after 5 events	04/02/2017 Oberstdorf	05/02/2017 Oberstdorf	19/03/2017 Vikersund	24/03/2017 Planica	26/03/2017 Planica	Total
	(Austria) Stefan Kraft	100	100	45	100	100	445
2	(Germany) Andreas Wellinger	80	80	13	80	80	333
3	(Poland) Kamil Stoch	60	29	100	45	45	279
4	(Japan) Noriaki Kasai	18	22	80	50	60	230
5	(Slovenia) Peter Prevc	40	50	40	26	40	196
6	(Austria) Michael Hayböck	36	26	60	40	22	184
7	(Germany) Markus Eisenbichler	32	9	0	60	50	151
8	(Slovenia) Jurij Tepeš	11	60	36	5	32	144
9	(Slovenia) Domen Prevc	45	36	32	11	14	138
10	(Poland) Piotr Żyła	29	32	8	36	24	129
11	(Norway) Daniel-André Tande	50	50	0	20	DSQ	120
12	(Norway) Robert Johansson	4	18	26	32	36	116
13	(Poland) Maciej Kot	13	40	18	22	18	111
14	(Norway) Andreas Stjernen	16	16	29	18	20	99
15	(Norway) Johann André Forfang	DNS	DNS	50	q	29	79
16	(Norway) Anders Fannemel	DNS	DNS	20	29	26	75
17	(Germany) Richard Freitag	26	24	1	6	15	72
18	(Japan) Daiki Ito	DNS	DNS	22	24	9	55
	(Germany) Karl Geiger	0	8	24	15	8	55
	(Slovenia) Jernej Damjan	20	15	4	9	7	55
	(Poland) Dawid Kubacki	3	14	14	8	16	55
22	(Austria) Manuel Fettner	24	3	5	7	13	52
23	(Russia) Evgeniy Klimov	14	13	0	2	12	41
24	(Switzerland) Simon Ammann	DNS	DNS	15	12	10	37
25	(Czech Republic) Roman Koudelka	DNS	DNS	11	14	11	36
26	(Slovenia) Anže Semenič	DSQ	11	12	10	DNS	33
27	(Poland) Jan Ziobro	22	4	q	q	3	29
	(Czech Republic) Tomáš Vančura	6	10	DNS	13	DNS	29
29	(United States) Kevin Bickner	7	5	16	q	DNS	28
30	(France) Vincent Descombes Sevoie	2	20	0	0	5	27
31	(Slovenia) Anže Lanišek	10	0	7	q	6	23
32	(Italy) Alex Insam	DNS	DNS	6	16	DNS	22
33	(Russia) Denis Kornilov	5	12	DNS	DNS	DNS	17
34	(Russia) Dimitry Vassiliev	15	q	DNS	DNS	DNS	15
	(Austria) Gregor Schlierenzauer	12	DNS	3	DNS	DNS	15
36	(Finland) Janne Ahonen	8	6	DNS	DNS	DNS	14
37	(Norway) Halvor Egner Granerud	DNS	DNS	10	q	DNS	10
38	(Czech Republic) Viktor Polášek	DNS	DNS	9	q	DNS	9
	(Germany) Andreas Wank	9	0	0	0	DNS	9
40	(Japan) Taku Takeuchi	DNS	DNS	q	4	4	8
41	(Slovenia) Cene Prevc	0	7	DNS	q	DNS	7
42	(Germany) Stephan Leyhe	0	2	q	0	2	4
43	(Italy) Sebastina Colloredo	DNS	DNS	q	3	DNS	3
	(Austria) Stefan Huber	DNS	DNS	2	1	DNS	3
45	(Estonia) Kaarel Nurmsalu	0	1	q	q	DNS	1
	(United States) Michael Glasder	1	0	0	q	DNS	1
47	(Germany) Pius Paschke	0	q	DNS	DNS	DNS	0
	(United States) William Rhoads	0	0	q	q	DNS	0
	(Poland) Stefan Hula	0	0	DNS	DNS	DNS	0
	(Japan) Ryōyū Kobayashi	0	0	q	0	DNS	0
	(Czech Republic) Jan Matura	0	0	q	q	DNS	0
	(Japan) Junshirō Kobayashi	0	0	q	q	DNS	0
	(Austria) Philipp Aschenwald	q	0	DNS	DNS	DNS	0
	(Canada) MacKenzie Boyd-Clowes	DSQ	0	q	0	DNS	0
	(Austria) Markus Schiffner	DNS	DNS	0	q	DNS	0
	(Norway) Joacim Ødegård Bjøreng	DNS	DNS	0	DNS	DNS	0
	(Finland) Jarkko Määttä	DNS	DNS	0	0	DNS	0
	(Switzerland) Gabriel Karlen	DNS	DNS	0	q	DNS	0
	(Russia) Alexey Romashov	DNS	DNS	q	0	DNS	0
	(Russia) Mikhail Nazarov	DNS	DNS	q	0	DNS	0
	(Finland) Antti Aalto	DNS	DNS	q	0	DNS	0
	(Slovenia) Tilen Bartol	DNS	DNS	DNS	0	DNS	0
	(Finland) Ville Larinto	DNS	DNS	DNS	0	DNS	0
