= Raw Air 2017 =

Ski-jumping and Ski-flying Tournament in 2017

Winners
- Raw Air overall: (Austria) Stefan Kraft

Competitions
- Venues: 4
- Individual: 9
- Team: 2

The Raw Air 2017 was the first edition of Raw Air, a ten-day tournament for men in ski jumping and ski flying held in Norway between 10–19 March 2017. It was part of the 2016–17 FIS Ski Jumping World Cup season. Fatih Arda İpcioğlu represented his country in qualifications of Lillehammer as first Turkish ski jumper in history of the World Cup competitions.

On 18 March 2017, the world record was improved twice at Vikersundbakken; firstly, Robert Johansson jumped 252 metres (827 ft), and about 30 minutes later Stefan Kraft landed at 253.5 metres (832 ft).

== Competition ==
=== Prize money ===
The competition had a record high prize money of €100,000 in total for top 3 competitors in overall standings: €60,000 for the title, €30,000 for the second place and €10,000 for the third place.

=== Format ===
The competition was held on four different hills in Oslo, Lillehammer, Trondheim, and Vikersund. It lasted for ten consecutive days with total of 14 rounds from individual events, team events and qualifications (prologues).

	Events	Rounds
Individual	3	6 (3x2)
Qualifications (prologue)	4	4 (4x1)
Team	2	4 (2x2)
Total	9	14

=== Judges ===
Judge	Country	Judges by hills									
Judge	Country	Oslo			Lillehammer		Trondheim		Vikersund		
Pascal Malec	France	A	E	A	D	D	Did not judge	Did not judge	Did not judge	Did not judge	Did not judge
Peter Knoll	Germany	B	A	B	A	A	Did not judge	Did not judge	Did not judge	Did not judge	Did not judge
Inge Eriksrød	Norway	C	B	C	Did not judge	Did not judge	Did not judge	Did not judge	Did not judge	Did not judge	Did not judge
Masahiko Takahashi	Japan	D	C	D	E	E	Did not judge	Did not judge	Did not judge	Did not judge	Did not judge
Martino De Crignis	Italy	E	D	E	B	B	Did not judge	Did not judge	Did not judge	Did not judge	Did not judge
Kjersti Haugen Espelid	Norway	Did not judge	Did not judge	Did not judge	C	C	Did not judge	Did not judge	Did not judge	Did not judge	Did not judge
Geir Steinar Loeng	Norway	Did not judge	Did not judge	Did not judge	Did not judge	Did not judge	A	A	Did not judge	Did not judge	Did not judge
Mark Servold	Canada	Did not judge	Did not judge	Did not judge	Did not judge	Did not judge	B	B	Did not judge	Did not judge	Did not judge
Marit Nybelius Stub	Sweden	Did not judge	Did not judge	Did not judge	Did not judge	Did not judge	C	C	Did not judge	Did not judge	Did not judge
Peter Kimmig	Germany	Did not judge	Did not judge	Did not judge	Did not judge	Did not judge	D	D	Did not judge	Did not judge	Did not judge
Jože Berčič	Slovenia	Did not judge	Did not judge	Did not judge	Did not judge	Did not judge	E	E	Did not judge	Did not judge	Did not judge
Petra Nordman	Finland	Did not judge	Did not judge	Did not judge	Did not judge	Did not judge	Did not judge	Did not judge	A	C	A
Hermann Gshwentner	Austria	Did not judge	Did not judge	Did not judge	Did not judge	Did not judge	Did not judge	Did not judge	B	E	B
Marek Pilch	Poland	Did not judge	Did not judge	Did not judge	Did not judge	Did not judge	Did not judge	Did not judge	C	B	C
Nasyr Nasyrow	Kazakhstan	Did not judge	Did not judge	Did not judge	Did not judge	Did not judge	Did not judge	Did not judge	D	A	D
Nicolai Sebergsen	Norway	Did not judge	Did not judge	Did not judge	Did not judge	Did not judge	Did not judge	Did not judge	E	D	E

=== Jury ===
Walter Hofer is the World Cup race director, Borek Sedlák as his assistant and Arne Åbråten as main coordinator of Raw Air:

Hill	Technical delegate	Technical delegate assistant	Chief competition	Control equipment	
Hill	Technical delegate	Technical delegate assistant	Chief competition	Before	After
Oslo	(Italy) Sandro Pertile	(Austria) Werner Rathmayr	(Norway) Svein Granerud	(Norway) Morten Solem	(Austria) Sepp Gratzer
Lillehammer	(Austria) Christian Kathol	(Finland) Pekka Hyvärinen	(Norway) Kristian Brenden	(Norway) Morten Solem	(Austria) Sepp Gratzer
Trondheim	(Austria) Christian Kathol	(Germany) Michael Lais	(Norway) Hroar Stjernen	(Norway) Morten Solem	(Austria) Sepp Gratzer
Vikersund	(France) Franck Salvi	(Slovenia) Aljoša Dolhar	(Norway) Ole Gunnar Fidjestøl	(Norway) Morten Solem	(Austria) Sepp Gratzer

=== Nations ===
Nation	Total	Competitors
Norway	13	Lindvik, Granerud, Søberg, Haukedal, Fannemel, Bjerkeengen, Bjøreng, Hilde, Aune, Johansson, Forfang, Tande, Stjernen
Slovenia	8	Peter Prevc, Domen Prevc, Bartol, Dežman, Semenič, Damjan, Lanišek, Tepeš
Poland	7	Murańka, Hula, Ziobro, Kubacki, Stoch, Kot, Żyła
Austria	7	Fettner, Hayböck, Kraft, Schiffner, Schlierenzauer, Kofler, Huber
Japan	6	Ito, Kasai, Junshirō Kobayashi, Ryōyū Kobayashi, Sakuyama, Takeuchi
Germany	6	Eisenbichler, Freitag, Geiger, Leyhe, Wank, Wellinger
Czech Republic	6	Polášek, Štursa, Vančura, Janda, Koudelka, Matura
Kazakhstan	5	Karpenko, Muminov, Sokolenko, Tkachenko, Zhaparov
Switzerland	5	Ammann, Deschwanden, Peier, Schuler, Karlen
Finland	5	Aalto, Ahonen, Larinto, Määttä, Nousiainen
Italy	4	Bresadola, Colloredo, Dellasega, Insam
Russia	4	Bazhenov, Klimov, Nazarov, Romashov
United States	4	Bickner, Glasder, Larson, Rhoads
France	1	Descombes Sevoie
Canada	1	Boyd-Clowes
Turkey	1	Arda İpcioğlu
Estonia	1	Nurmsalu

== Schedule ==
=== Map of hosts ===
Raw Air 2017 (Norway)

=== Individual ===
No.	Season	Date	Place	Hill	Size	Winner	Second	Third	Event	Rounds	Raw Air bib	Ref.
1	1	10 March 2017	(Norway) Oslo	Holmenkollbakken HS134	LH	(Germany) Andreas Wellinger	(Slovenia) Peter Prevc	(Germany) Richard Freitag	prologue	1R	(Germany) Andreas Wellinger	
2	2	11 March 2017	(Norway) Oslo	Holmenkollbakken HS134	LH	(Austria) Stefan Kraft	(Poland) Piotr Żyła	(Austria) Michael Hayböck	team	2R	(Austria) Stefan Kraft	
3	3	12 March 2017	(Norway) Oslo	Holmenkollbakken HS134	LH	(Austria) Stefan Kraft	(Germany) Andreas Wellinger	(Germany) Markus Eisenbichler	individual	2R	(Austria) Stefan Kraft	
4	4	13 March 2017	(Norway) Lillehammer	Lysgårdsbakken HS138 (night)	LH	(Germany) Markus Eisenbichler	(Germany) Richard Freitag	(Austria) Stefan Kraft	prologue	1R	(Austria) Stefan Kraft	
		14 March 2017	(Norway) Lillehammer	Lysgårdsbakken HS138 (night)	LH	strong wind; cancelled after 26 of 50 jumpers and moved to Vikersund in one round			individual	2R		
5	5	15 March 2017	(Norway) Trondheim	Granåsen HS140 (night)	LH	(Poland) Kamil Stoch	(Norway) Andreas Stjernen	(Germany) Andreas Wellinger	prologue	1R	(Germany) Andreas Wellinger	
6	6	16 March 2017	(Norway) Trondheim	Granåsen HS140 (night)	LH	(Austria) Stefan Kraft	(Norway) Andreas Stjernen	(Germany) Andreas Wellinger	individual	2R	(Austria) Stefan Kraft	
		(Note: Canceled individual event from 14 March in Lilehammer was rescheduled to a ski flying hill in Vikersund as a one-round event on 17 March.) 17 March 2017	(Norway) Vikersund	Vikersundbakken HS225	FH	strong wind; rescheduled one-round competition from Lillehamer was converted to prologue			individual	1R		
7	7	(Note: Prologue in Vikersund was rescheduled from 17 to 18 March.) 17 March 2017	(Norway) Vikersund	Vikersundbakken HS225 (night)	FH	(Poland) Kamil Stoch	(Germany) Andreas Wellinger	(Slovenia) Domen Prevc	prologue	1R	(Germany) Andreas Wellinger	
8	8	18 March 2017	(Norway) Vikersund	Vikersundbakken HS225	FH	(Austria) Stefan Kraft	(Poland) Kamil Stoch	(Germany) Andreas Wellinger	team	2R	(Germany) Andreas Wellinger	
9	9	19 March 2017	(Norway) Vikersund	Vikersundbakken HS225	FH	(Poland) Kamil Stoch	(Japan) Noriaki Kasai	(Austria) Michael Hayböck	individual	2R	(Austria) Stefan Kraft	
1st Raw Air Overall (final standings after 9 events)						(Austria) Stefan Kraft	(Poland) Kamil Stoch	(Germany) Andreas Wellinger		14R		

=== Team ===
No.	Season	Date	Place	Hill	Size	Winner	Second	Third	Note	Ref.
1	1	11 March 2017	(Norway) Oslo	Holmenkollbakken HS134	LH	Austria Michael Hayböck; Manuel Fettner; Markus Schiffner; Stefan Kraft	Germany Markus Eisenbichler; Stephan Leyhe; Richard Freitag; Andreas Wellinger	Poland Piotr Żyła; Kamil Stoch; Dawid Kubacki; Maciej Kot	both rounds count individual in Raw Air overall	
2	2	18 March 2017	(Norway) Vikersund	Vikersundbakken HS225	FH	Norway Daniel-André Tande; Robert Johansson; Johann André Forfang; Andreas Stjernen	Poland Piotr Żyła; Dawid Kubacki; Maciej Kot; Kamil Stoch	Austria Michael Hayböck; Manuel Fettner; Gregor Schlierenzauer; Stefan Kraft	both rounds count individual in Raw Air overall	

== Raw Air standings ==
Rank	After 9 events	10/03/2017 Oslo		11/03/2017 Oslo			12/03/2017 Oslo			13/03/2017 Lillehammer		14/03/2017 Lillehammer	15/03/2017 Trondheim		16/03/2017 Trondheim			17/03/2017 Vikersund	17/03/2017 Vikersund		18/03/2017 Vikersund			19/03/2017 Vikersund			Total points (14)
Rank	After 9 events	Prologue (Q)		Team (2R)			Individual (2R)			Prologue (Q)		Individual	Prologue (Q)		Individual (2R)			Individual	Prologue (Q)		Team (2R)			Individual (2R)			Total points (14)
Rank	After 9 events	Rank	Points (R1)	Rank	Points (R2)	Points (R3)	Rank	Points (R4)	Points (R5)	Rank	Points (R6)	Two rounds	Rank	Points (R7)	Rank	Points (R8)	Points (R9)	One round	Rank	Points (R10)	Rank	Points (R11)	Points (R12)	Rank	Points (R13)	Points (R14)	Total points (14)
1st place, gold medalist(s)	(Austria) Stefan Kraft	5	129.8	1	140.3	134.2	1	133.3	134.2	3	151.8	S T R O N G W I D ___ C A N C E L E D A F T E R T W E N T Y S I X O F F I F T Y J U M P E R S	27	111.5	1	148.8	153.2	S T R O N G W I N D ___ R E S C E D U E D F R O M L I L L E H A M M E R ___ C O N V E R T E D T O P R O L O G U E	10	184.8	1	230.5	220.9	5	226.9	197.9	2298.1
2nd place, silver medalist(s)	(Poland) Kamil Stoch	11	124.5	8	124.9	126.8	22	121.0	90.2	25	128.5	S T R O N G W I D ___ C A N C E L E D A F T E R T W E N T Y S I X O F F I F T Y J U M P E R S	1	146.0	5	144.7	140.4	S T R O N G W I N D ___ R E S C E D U E D F R O M L I L L E H A M M E R ___ C O N V E R T E D T O P R O L O G U E	1	216.9	2	224.1	218.0	1	228.3	238.3	2272.6
3rd place, bronze medalist(s)	(Germany) Andreas Wellinger	1	140.5	7	123.5	128.7	2	135.0	123.6	4	151.4	S T R O N G W I D ___ C A N C E L E D A F T E R T W E N T Y S I X O F F I F T Y J U M P E R S	3	139.5	3	138.1	151.5	S T R O N G W I N D ___ R E S C E D U E D F R O M L I L L E H A M M E R ___ C O N V E R T E D T O P R O L O G U E	2	214.1	3	220.5	213.5	18	228.9	142.9	2251.3
4	(Norway) Andreas Stjernen	10	127.7	12	128.9	114.6	5	116.9	124.8	6	149.1	S T R O N G W I D ___ C A N C E L E D A F T E R T W E N T Y S I X O F F I F T Y J U M P E R S	2	144.5	2	147.5	146.8	S T R O N G W I N D ___ R E S C E D U E D F R O M L I L L E H A M M E R ___ C O N V E R T E D T O P R O L O G U E	12	179.9	4	207.3	217.7	9	201.0	203.4	2210.1
5	(Slovenia) Peter Prevc	2	135.9	4	130.7	128.6	16	108.4	110.1	14	140.9	S T R O N G W I D ___ C A N C E L E D A F T E R T W E N T Y S I X O F F I F T Y J U M P E R S	5	135.2	7	132.9	137.3	S T R O N G W I N D ___ R E S C E D U E D F R O M L I L L E H A M M E R ___ C O N V E R T E D T O P R O L O G U E	9	186.7	6	224.4	186.2	6	210.7	212.4	2180.4
6	(Norway) Johann André Forfang	12	123.2	6	126.5	126.2	10	100.0	124.6	9	146.0	S T R O N G W I D ___ C A N C E L E D A F T E R T W E N T Y S I X O F F I F T Y J U M P E R S	4	137.4	6	139.4	141.6	S T R O N G W I N D ___ R E S C E D U E D F R O M L I L L E H A M M E R ___ C O N V E R T E D T O P R O L O G U E	17	174.6	8	202.9	189.3	4	209.9	218.8	2160.4
7	(Poland) Maciej Kot	6	129.5	15	115.4	122.5	11	103.0	119.3	12	144.9	S T R O N G W I D ___ C A N C E L E D A F T E R T W E N T Y S I X O F F I F T Y J U M P E R S	10	124.8	13	124.9	130.8	S T R O N G W I N D ___ R E S C E D U E D F R O M L I L L E H A M M E R ___ C O N V E R T E D T O P R O L O G U E	7	196.8	7	213.1	190.7	14	199.5	187.7	2102.9
8	(Japan) Noriaki Kasai	27	115.7	19	113.9	117.0	13	105.6	115.8	15	134.1	S T R O N G W I D ___ C A N C E L E D A F T E R T W E N T Y S I X O F F I F T Y J U M P E R S	23	114.4	15	129.5	125.1	S T R O N G W I N D ___ R E S C E D U E D F R O M L I L L E H A M M E R ___ C O N V E R T E D T O P R O L O G U E	6	200.2	11	191.4	188.3	2	216.5	231.5	2099.0
9	(Norway) Robert Johansson	22	118.6	18	109.6	123.9	6	119.8	119.7	5	151.3	S T R O N G W I D ___ C A N C E L E D A F T E R T W E N T Y S I X O F F I F T Y J U M P E R S	19	116.3	29	117.5	116.3	S T R O N G W I N D ___ R E S C E D U E D F R O M L I L L E H A M M E R ___ C O N V E R T E D T O P R O L O G U E	11	183.9	5	213.9	196.9	10	210.6	192.4	2090.7
10	(Japan) Daiki Itō	16	120.8	10	116.7	128.4	4	123.0	120.5	17	131.6	S T R O N G W I D ___ C A N C E L E D A F T E R T W E N T Y S I X O F F I F T Y J U M P E R S	7	132.2	17	129.1	122.4	S T R O N G W I N D ___ R E S C E D U E D F R O M L I L L E H A M M E R ___ C O N V E R T E D T O P R O L O G U E	13	178.9	10	208.3	176.3	12	199.0	195.0	2082.2
11	(Switzerland) Simon Ammann	26	116.0	16	120.3	116.5	17	109.0	109.3	24	129.1	S T R O N G W I D ___ C A N C E L E D A F T E R T W E N T Y S I X O F F I F T Y J U M P E R S	9	125.9	16	128.5	123.	S T R O N G W I N D ___ R E S C E D U E D F R O M L I L L E H A M M E R ___ C O N V E R T E D T O P R O L O G U E	27	166.0	12	195.8	182.4	16	187.2	189.7	1998.8
12	(Austria) Michael Hayböck	12	122.5	3	134.1	127.5	15	110.5	109.1	20	130.4	S T R O N G W I D ___ C A N C E L E D A F T E R T W E N T Y S I X O F F I F T Y J U M P E R S	DNS	—	26	119.5	120.7	S T R O N G W I N D ___ R E S C E D U E D F R O M L I L L E H A M M E R ___ C O N V E R T E D T O P R O L O G U E	4	202.9	13	204.4	173.2	3	225.3	205.1	1985.2
13	(Czech Republic) Roman Koudelka	18	120.0	20	111.9	116.1	19	104.6	111.2	8	147.1	S T R O N G W I D ___ C A N C E L E D A F T E R T W E N T Y S I X O F F I F T Y J U M P E R S	34	108.5	9	128.5	135.9	S T R O N G W I N D ___ R E S C E D U E D F R O M L I L L E H A M M E R ___ C O N V E R T E D T O P R O L O G U E	37	149.1	15	192.7	176.6	20	175.1	179.3	1956.6
14	(Poland) Piotr Żyła	7	128.9	2	131.9	131.4	9	116.7	110.5	10	145.9	S T R O N G W I D ___ C A N C E L E D A F T E R T W E N T Y S I X O F F I F T Y J U M P E R S	16	118.0	23	126.4	118.1	S T R O N G W I N D ___ R E S C E D U E D F R O M L I L L E H A M M E R ___ C O N V E R T E D T O P R O L O G U E	62	107.4	16	199.8	160.3	23	159.2	175.8	1930.3
15	(Germany) Richard Freitag	3	131.8	11	126.5	117.6	14	112.9	108.2	2	151.9	S T R O N G W I D ___ C A N C E L E D A F T E R T W E N T Y S I X O F F I F T Y J U M P E R S	13	120.3	8	136.3	132.1	S T R O N G W I N D ___ R E S C E D U E D F R O M L I L L E H A M M E R ___ C O N V E R T E D T O P R O L O G U E	36	150.9	19	175.1	166.1	30	164.5	63.4	1857.6
16	(Germany) Markus Eisenbichler	4	130.0	9	133.2	115.0	3	120.4	123.7	1	163.1	S T R O N G W I D ___ C A N C E L E D A F T E R T W E N T Y S I X O F F I F T Y J U M P E R S	8	132.1	4	145.5	143.2	S T R O N G W I N D ___ R E S C E D U E D F R O M L I L L E H A M M E R ___ C O N V E R T E D T O P R O L O G U E	5	200.6	21	181.0	146.4	38	95.3	DNQ	1829.5
17	(Austria) Manuel Fettner	8	127.9	14	120.4	121.6	8	115.0	112.7	29	126.4	S T R O N G W I D ___ C A N C E L E D A F T E R T W E N T Y S I X O F F I F T Y J U M P E R S	DNS	—	11	125.9	134.5	S T R O N G W I N D ___ R E S C E D U E D F R O M L I L L E H A M M E R ___ C O N V E R T E D T O P R O L O G U E	19	170.6	17	211.2	133.6	26	157.1	144.9	1801.8
18	(Poland) Dawid Kubacki	8	127.9	17	113.7	120.1	23	109.1	101.9	53	103.2	S T R O N G W I D ___ C A N C E L E D A F T E R T W E N T Y S I X O F F I F T Y J U M P E R S	45	103.2	37	114.3	DNQ	S T R O N G W I N D ___ R E S C E D U E D F R O M L I L L E H A M M E R ___ C O N V E R T E D T O P R O L O G U E	18	173.2	20	180.6	152.0	17	177.8	194.4	1771.4
19	(Norway) Daniel-André Tande	23	118.3	5	123.1	130.3	7	121.4	115.4	51	111.7	S T R O N G W I D ___ C A N C E L E D A F T E R T W E N T Y S I X O F F I F T Y J U M P E R S	54	97.1	10	125.1	136.2	S T R O N G W I N D ___ R E S C E D U E D F R O M L I L L E H A M M E R ___ C O N V E R T E D T O P R O L O G U E	21	169.9	18	194.0	150.6	32	150.8	150.8	1743.9
20	(Czech Republic) Viktor Polášek	40	108.1	26	99.7	97.8	43	86.4	DNQ	21	130.1	S T R O N G W I D ___ C A N C E L E D A F T E R T W E N T Y S I X O F F I F T Y J U M P E R S	15	119.6	27	123.0	116.8	S T R O N G W I N D ___ R E S C E D U E D F R O M L I L L E H A M M E R ___ C O N V E R T E D T O P R O L O G U E	38	148.7	22	158.5	137.1	22	178.5	163.0	1667.3
21	(Slovenia) Jurij Tepeš	44	106.3	DNS	—	—	27	106.0	95.9	37	120.8	S T R O N G W I D ___ C A N C E L E D A F T E R T W E N T Y S I X O F F I F T Y J U M P E R S	47	102.1	DNQ	—	—	S T R O N G W I N D ___ R E S C E D U E D F R O M L I L L E H A M M E R ___ C O N V E R T E D T O P R O L O G U E	8	191.7	14	175.9	195.6	7	205.1	216.7	1516.1
22	(Slovenia) Jernej Damjan	23	118.3	30	97.7	95.4	26	104.6	97.4	11	145.6	S T R O N G W I D ___ C A N C E L E D A F T E R T W E N T Y S I X O F F I F T Y J U M P E R S	35	108.4	19	125.7	123.6	S T R O N G W I N D ___ R E S C E D U E D F R O M L I L L E H A M M E R ___ C O N V E R T E D T O P R O L O G U E	22	169.5	DNS	—	—	27	203.4	78.8	1468.4
23	(Germany) Karl Geiger	38	109.0	DNS	—	—	25	96.0	108.0	39	118.8	S T R O N G W I D ___ C A N C E L E D A F T E R T W E N T Y S I X O F F I F T Y J U M P E R S	25	112.8	31	116.1	DNQ	S T R O N G W I N D ___ R E S C E D U E D F R O M L I L L E H A M M E R ___ C O N V E R T E D T O P R O L O G U E	28	163.3	29	71.8	131.2	11	198.7	199.8	1425.5
24	(Slovenia) Domen Prevc	DNS	—	DNS	—	—	DNS	—	—	33	123.4	S T R O N G W I D ___ C A N C E L E D A F T E R T W E N T Y S I X O F F I F T Y J U M P E R S	DNS	—	24	125.6	118.3	S T R O N G W I N D ___ R E S C E D U E D F R O M L I L L E H A M M E R ___ C O N V E R T E D T O P R O L O G U E	3	207.6	9	194.7	191.9	8	208.8	200.9	1370.9
25	(Japan) Taku Takeuchi	45	105.7	23	105.0	114.2	24	113.3	95.6	34	122.8	S T R O N G W I D ___ C A N C E L E D A F T E R T W E N T Y S I X O F F I F T Y J U M P E R S	33	108.8	43	109.7	DNQ	S T R O N G W I N D ___ R E S C E D U E D F R O M L I L L E H A M M E R ___ C O N V E R T E D T O P R O L O G U E	45	142.8	24	167.1	123.2	DNQ	—	—	1308.5
26	(Italy) Alex Insam	38	108.2	33	112.1	DNQ	44	83.5	DNQ	43	116.5	S T R O N G W I D ___ C A N C E L E D A F T E R T W E N T Y S I X O F F I F T Y J U M P E R S	20	116.0	35	114.5	DNQ	S T R O N G W I N D ___ R E S C E D U E D F R O M L I L L E H A M M E R ___ C O N V E R T E D T O P R O L O G U E	34	151.7	38	142.6	DNQ	25	162.6	145.4	1253.1
27	(Germany) Stephan Leyhe	15	121.5	13	120.6	122.1	18	107.7	108.9	18	130.6	S T R O N G W I D ___ C A N C E L E D A F T E R T W E N T Y S I X O F F I F T Y J U M P E R S	26	112.1	28	121.1	113.2	S T R O N G W I N D ___ R E S C E D U E D F R O M L I L L E H A M M E R ___ C O N V E R T E D T O P R O L O G U E	43	144.2	DNS	—	—	DNQ	—	—	1202.0
28	(Austria) Gregor Schlierenzauer	21	119.1	DNS	—	—	20	110.0	104.4	19	130.5	S T R O N G W I D ___ C A N C E L E D A F T E R T W E N T Y S I X O F F I F T Y J U M P E R S	DNS	—	DNS	—	—	S T R O N G W I N D ___ R E S C E D U E D F R O M L I L L E H A M M E R ___ C O N V E R T E D T O P R O L O G U E	30	161.3	23	132.9	158.7	28	161.4	97.4	1175.7
29	(France) Vincent Descombes Sevoie	19	119.7	DNS	—	—	12	111.3	110.9	27	127.7	S T R O N G W I D ___ C A N C E L E D A F T E R T W E N T Y S I X O F F I F T Y J U M P E R S	6	134.3	20	126.5	121.8	S T R O N G W I N D ___ R E S C E D U E D F R O M L I L L E H A M M E R ___ C O N V E R T E D T O P R O L O G U E	26	167.7	DNS	—	—	35	140.0	140.0	1159.2
30	(Slovenia) Anže Lanišek	DQ	—	DNS	—	—	DNQ	—	—	13	141.4	S T R O N G W I D ___ C A N C E L E D A F T E R T W E N T Y S I X O F F I F T Y J U M P E R S	10	124.8	32	116.0	DNQ	S T R O N G W I N D ___ R E S C E D U E D F R O M L I L L E H A M M E R ___ C O N V E R T E D T O P R O L O G U E	16	176.6	26	83.6	172.0	24	155.9	159.7	1130.0
31	(United States) Kevin Bickner	52	94.8	44	78.8	DNQ	DNQ	—	—	45	114.8	S T R O N G W I D ___ C A N C E L E D A F T E R T W E N T Y S I X O F F I F T Y J U M P E R S	49	100.6	DNQ	—	—	S T R O N G W I N D ___ R E S C E D U E D F R O M L I L L E H A M M E R ___ C O N V E R T E D T O P R O L O G U E	24	167.5	33	164.0	DNQ	15	203.3	178.8	1102.6
32	(Austria) Markus Schiffner	20	119.6	22	105.5	116.1	33	93.4	DNQ	26	128.0	S T R O N G W I D ___ C A N C E L E D A F T E R T W E N T Y S I X O F F I F T Y J U M P E R S	32	109.2	33	115.5	DNQ	S T R O N G W I N D ___ R E S C E D U E D F R O M L I L L E H A M M E R ___ C O N V E R T E D T O P R O L O G U E	31	160.1	DNS	—	—	31	155.0	DNQ	1102.4
33	(Finland) Jarkko Määttä	37	109.2	35	104.0	DNQ	36	91.5	DNQ	16	131.7	S T R O N G W I D ___ C A N C E L E D A F T E R T W E N T Y S I X O F F I F T Y J U M P E R S	17	116.4	42	109.9	DNQ	S T R O N G W I N D ___ R E S C E D U E D F R O M L I L L E H A M M E R ___ C O N V E R T E D T O P R O L O G U E	23	169.2	35	158.9	DNQ	39	91.3	DNQ	1082.1
34	(Norway) Anders Fannemel	DQ	—	DNS	—	—	DNQ	—	—	7	148.9	S T R O N G W I D ___ C A N C E L E D A F T E R T W E N T Y S I X O F F I F T Y J U M P E R S	17	116.4	14	126.3	128.5	S T R O N G W I N D ___ R E S C E D U E D F R O M L I L L E H A M M E R ___ C O N V E R T E D T O P R O L O G U E	25	167.1	DNS	—	—	13	189.6	203.0	1079.8
35	(Slovenia) Anže Semenič	46	103.3	DNS	—	—	28	99.8	101.0	50	112.7	S T R O N G W I D ___ C A N C E L E D A F T E R T W E N T Y S I X O F F I F T Y J U M P E R S	49	100.6	DNQ	—	—	S T R O N G W I N D ___ R E S C E D U E D F R O M L I L L E H A M M E R ___ C O N V E R T E D T O P R O L O G U E	20	170.1	DNS	—	—	19	174.2	186.1	1047.8
36	(Switzerland) Killian Peier	48	103.1	25	96.6	112.6	37	91.1	DNQ	40	118.5	S T R O N G W I D ___ C A N C E L E D A F T E R T W E N T Y S I X O F F I F T Y J U M P E R S	31	109.3	40	111.5	DNQ	S T R O N G W I N D ___ R E S C E D U E D F R O M L I L L E H A M M E R ___ C O N V E R T E D T O P R O L O G U E	57	117.8	32	73.1	108.5	DNQ	—	—	1042.1
37	(Switzerland) Gregor Deschwanden	35	110.2	31	95.0	95.0	38	90.7	DNQ	35	121.6	S T R O N G W I D ___ C A N C E L E D A F T E R T W E N T Y S I X O F F I F T Y J U M P E R S	53	97.8	DNQ	—	—	S T R O N G W I N D ___ R E S C E D U E D F R O M L I L L E H A M M E R ___ C O N V E R T E D T O P R O L O G U E	40	147.1	28	132.7	103.1	DNQ	—	—	993.2
38	(Norway) Joakim Aune	17	120.3	DNS	—	—	21	108.3	103.8	23	129.2	S T R O N G W I D ___ C A N C E L E D A F T E R T W E N T Y S I X O F F I F T Y J U M P E R S	28	111.2	18	119.7	130.5	S T R O N G W I N D ___ R E S C E D U E D F R O M L I L L E H A M M E R ___ C O N V E R T E D T O P R O L O G U E	55	120.0	DNS	—	—	DNQ	—	—	943.0
39	(Japan) Ryōyū Kobayashi	40	108.1	29	98.6	96.0	39	90.2	DNQ	DQ	—	S T R O N G W I D ___ C A N C E L E D A F T E R T W E N T Y S I X O F F I F T Y J U M P E R S	21	115.3	44	109.5	DNQ	S T R O N G W I N D ___ R E S C E D U E D F R O M L I L L E H A M M E R ___ C O N V E R T E D T O P R O L O G U E	50	135.1	31	101.3	85.3	DNQ	—	—	939.4
40	(Russia) Evgeniy Klimov	DNS	—	DNS	—	—	DNS	—	—	56	98.9	S T R O N G W I D ___ C A N C E L E D A F T E R T W E N T Y S I X O F F I F T Y J U M P E R S	12	124.7	12	130.5	128.5	S T R O N G W I N D ___ R E S C E D U E D F R O M L I L L E H A M M E R ___ C O N V E R T E D T O P R O L O G U E	14	177.4	39	130.4	DNQ	36	137.7	DNQ	927.8
41	(Germany) Andreas Wank	32	112.3	DNS	—	—	47	78.1	DNQ	49	112.9	S T R O N G W I D ___ C A N C E L E D A F T E R T W E N T Y S I X O F F I F T Y J U M P E R S	40	106.5	25	121.6	119.7	S T R O N G W I N D ___ R E S C E D U E D F R O M L I L L E H A M M E R ___ C O N V E R T E D T O P R O L O G U E	33	157.1	DNS	—	—	37	100.0	DNQ	808.2
42	(Finland) Antti Aalto	34	111.0	34	107.9	DNQ	32	94.1	DNQ	62	80.9	S T R O N G W I D ___ C A N C E L E D A F T E R T W E N T Y S I X O F F I F T Y J U M P E R S	29	110.7	36	114.4	DNQ	S T R O N G W I N D ___ R E S C E D U E D F R O M L I L L E H A M M E R ___ C O N V E R T E D T O P R O L O G U E	51	133.9	37	155.2	DNQ	DNQ	—	—	908.1
43	(Italy) Davide Bresadola	36	109.9	36	103.1	DNQ	50	77.0	DNQ	46	114.4	S T R O N G W I D ___ C A N C E L E D A F T E R T W E N T Y S I X O F F I F T Y J U M P E R S	22	114.5	21	120.6	126.4	S T R O N G W I N D ___ R E S C E D U E D F R O M L I L L E H A M M E R ___ C O N V E R T E D T O P R O L O G U E	49	137.2	DNS	—	—	DNQ	—	—	903.1
44	(Italy) Sebastian Colloredo	42	108.0	38	94.7	DNQ	30	94.9	101.6	60	88.7	S T R O N G W I D ___ C A N C E L E D A F T E R T W E N T Y S I X O F F I F T Y J U M P E R S	38	106.9	47	102.1	DNQ	S T R O N G W I N D ___ R E S C E D U E D F R O M L I L L E H A M M E R ___ C O N V E R T E D T O P R O L O G U E	64	96.0	42	99.8	DNQ	DNQ	—	—	892.7
45	(Norway) Halvor Egner Granerud	DQ	—	DNS	—	—	DNQ	—	—	DNS	—	S T R O N G W I D ___ C A N C E L E D A F T E R T W E N T Y S I X O F F I F T Y J U M P E R S	13	120.3	22	128.9	117.8	S T R O N G W I N D ___ R E S C E D U E D F R O M L I L L E H A M M E R ___ C O N V E R T E D T O P R O L O G U E	15	176.8	DNS	—	—	21	171.9	172.0	887.7
46	(Slovenia) Nejc Dežman	33	111.8	24	115.2	103.7	42	87.8	DNQ	52	105.8	S T R O N G W I D ___ C A N C E L E D A F T E R T W E N T Y S I X O F F I F T Y J U M P E R S	36	108.3	45	108.2	DNQ	S T R O N G W I N D ___ R E S C E D U E D F R O M L I L L E H A M M E R ___ C O N V E R T E D T O P R O L O G U E	42	146.2	DNS	—	—	DNQ	—	—	887.0
47	(Finland) Ville Larinto	45	113.7	42	90.1	DNQ	40	88.0	DNQ	42	116.9	S T R O N G W I D ___ C A N C E L E D A F T E R T W E N T Y S I X O F F I F T Y J U M P E R S	48	101.9	DNQ	—	—	S T R O N G W I N D ___ R E S C E D U E D F R O M L I L L E H A M M E R ___ C O N V E R T E D T O P R O L O G U E	48	138.6	40	117.6	DNQ	DNQ	—	—	766.8
48	(United States) Michael Glasder	DQ	—	41	91.2	DNQ	DNQ	—	—	61	85.6	S T R O N G W I D ___ C A N C E L E D A F T E R T W E N T Y S I X O F F I F T Y J U M P E R S	57	93.4	DNQ	—	—	S T R O N G W I N D ___ R E S C E D U E D F R O M L I L L E H A M M E R ___ C O N V E R T E D T O P R O L O G U E	29	163.9	41	105.3	DNQ	33	147.7	DNQ	684.4
49	(Czech Republic) Vojtěch Štursa	49	97.3	28	98.6	97.2	35	92.0	DNQ	48	113.0	S T R O N G W I D ___ C A N C E L E D A F T E R T W E N T Y S I X O F F I F T Y J U M P E R S	59	91.0	DNQ	—	—	S T R O N G W I N D ___ R E S C E D U E D F R O M L I L L E H A M M E R ___ C O N V E R T E D T O P R O L O G U E	65	92.7	DNS	—	—	DNQ	—	—	681.8
50	(Austria) Andreas Kofler	25	116.6	DNS	—	—	34	93.1	DNQ	22	130.0	S T R O N G W I D ___ C A N C E L E D A F T E R T W E N T Y S I X O F F I F T Y J U M P E R S	46	102.8	30	117.5	114.6	S T R O N G W I N D ___ R E S C E D U E D F R O M L I L L E H A M M E R ___ C O N V E R T E D T O P R O L O G U E	DNS	—	DNS	—	—	DNS	—	—	674.6
51	(Czech Republic) Jakub Janda	31	113.2	21	115.2	107.2	29	96.9	102.8	30	126.0	S T R O N G W I D ___ C A N C E L E D A F T E R T W E N T Y S I X O F F I F T Y J U M P E R S	DNS	—	DNS	—	—	S T R O N G W I N D ___ R E S C E D U E D F R O M L I L L E H A M M E R ___ C O N V E R T E D T O P R O L O G U E	DNS	—	DNS	—	—	DNS	—	—	661.3
52	(Russia) Alexey Romashov	62	85.9	DNS	—	—	DNQ	—	—	28	127.2	S T R O N G W I D ___ C A N C E L E D A F T E R T W E N T Y S I X O F F I F T Y J U M P E R S	37	107.0	50	100.1	DNQ	S T R O N G W I N D ___ R E S C E D U E D F R O M L I L L E H A M M E R ___ C O N V E R T E D T O P R O L O G U E	68	80.5	36	157.5	DNQ	DNQ	—	—	658.2
53	(Czech Republic) Jan Matura	DNS	—	DNS	—	—	DNS	—	—	DNS	—	S T R O N G W I D ___ C A N C E L E D A F T E R T W E N T Y S I X O F F I F T Y J U M P E R S	39	106.6	38	113.7	DNQ	S T R O N G W I N D ___ R E S C E D U E D F R O M L I L L E H A M M E R ___ C O N V E R T E D T O P R O L O G U E	47	139.8	25	137.0	133.5	DNQ	—	—	630.6
54	(Japan) Junshirō Kobayashi	43	107.3	DNS	—	—	45	81.4	DNQ	54	101.7	S T R O N G W I D ___ C A N C E L E D A F T E R T W E N T Y S I X O F F I F T Y J U M P E R S	44	104.1	39	113.6	DNQ	S T R O N G W I N D ___ R E S C E D U E D F R O M L I L L E H A M M E R ___ C O N V E R T E D T O P R O L O G U E	56	118.8	DNS	—	—	DNQ	—	—	626.9
55	(United States) Casey Larson	DQ	—	40	92.0	DNQ	DNQ	—	—	63	76.3	S T R O N G W I D ___ C A N C E L E D A F T E R T W E N T Y S I X O F F I F T Y J U M P E R S	41	105.0	48	100.4	DNQ	S T R O N G W I N D ___ R E S C E D U E D F R O M L I L L E H A M M E R ___ C O N V E R T E D T O P R O L O G U E	67	84.8	34	161.5	DNQ	DNQ	—	—	620.0
56	(Canada) MacKenzie Boyd-Clowes	54	91.9	DNS	—	—	DNQ	—	—	47	114.2	S T R O N G W I D ___ C A N C E L E D A F T E R T W E N T Y S I X O F F I F T Y J U M P E R S	42	104.5	41	110.3	DNQ	S T R O N G W I N D ___ R E S C E D U E D F R O M L I L L E H A M M E R ___ C O N V E R T E D T O P R O L O G U E	40	147.1	DNS	—	—	DNQ	—	—	568.0
57	(United States) William Rhoads	59	89.0	37	101.0	DNQ	DNQ	—	—	59	89.1	S T R O N G W I D ___ C A N C E L E D A F T E R T W E N T Y S I X O F F I F T Y J U M P E R S	56	95.4	DNQ	—	—	S T R O N G W I N D ___ R E S C E D U E D F R O M L I L L E H A M M E R ___ C O N V E R T E D T O P R O L O G U E	59	117.2	45	76.0	DNQ	DNQ	—	—	567.7
58	(Poland) Jan Ziobro	14	121.6	DNS	—	—	46	80.3	DNQ	38	120.3	S T R O N G W I D ___ C A N C E L E D A F T E R T W E N T Y S I X O F F I F T Y J U M P E R S	51	98.7	DNQ	—	—	S T R O N G W I N D ___ R E S C E D U E D F R O M L I L L E H A M M E R ___ C O N V E R T E D T O P R O L O G U E	46	142.4	DNS	—	—	DNQ	—	—	563.3
59	(Switzerland) Gabriel Karlen	DNS	—	DNS	—	—	DNS	—	—	DNS	—	S T R O N G W I D ___ C A N C E L E D A F T E R T W E N T Y S I X O F F I F T Y J U M P E R S	62	75.6	DNQ	—	—	S T R O N G W I N D ___ R E S C E D U E D F R O M L I L L E H A M M E R ___ C O N V E R T E D T O P R O L O G U E	32	158.7	27	120.3	126.0	40	58.1	DNQ	538.7
60	(Estonia) Kaarel Nurmsalu	59	89.0	DNS	—	—	DNQ	—	—	68	67.8	S T R O N G W I D ___ C A N C E L E D A F T E R T W E N T Y S I X O F F I F T Y J U M P E R S	43	104.2	46	107.6	DNQ	S T R O N G W I N D ___ R E S C E D U E D F R O M L I L L E H A M M E R ___ C O N V E R T E D T O P R O L O G U E	44	143.4	DNS	—	—	DNQ	—	—	512.0
61	(Czech Republic) Tomáš Vančura	53	93.7	DNS	—	—	DNQ	—	—	DQ	—	S T R O N G W I D ___ C A N C E L E D A F T E R T W E N T Y S I X O F F I F T Y J U M P E R S	55	95.5	DNQ	—	—	S T R O N G W I N D ___ R E S C E D U E D F R O M L I L L E H A M M E R ___ C O N V E R T E D T O P R O L O G U E	53	126.7	30	98.1	94.9	DNQ	—	—	508.9
62	(Slovenia) Tilen Bartol	28	115.5	27	102.4	95.0	31	94.9	96.4	DNS	—	S T R O N G W I D ___ C A N C E L E D A F T E R T W E N T Y S I X O F F I F T Y J U M P E R S	DNS	—	DNS	—	—	S T R O N G W I N D ___ R E S C E D U E D F R O M L I L L E H A M M E R ___ C O N V E R T E D T O P R O L O G U E	DNS	—	DNS	—	—	DNS	—	—	504.2
63	(Norway) Joacim Ødegård Bjøreng	50	96.7	DNS	—	—	40	88.0	DNQ	DNS	—	S T R O N G W I D ___ C A N C E L E D A F T E R T W E N T Y S I X O F F I F T Y J U M P E R S	DNS	—	DNS	—	—	S T R O N G W I N D ___ R E S C E D U E D F R O M L I L L E H A M M E R ___ C O N V E R T E D T O P R O L O G U E	39	147.6	DNS	—	—	34	143.4	DNQ	475.7
64	(Poland) Klemens Murańka	DQ	—	DNS	—	—	DNQ	—	—	41	118.4	S T R O N G W I D ___ C A N C E L E D A F T E R T W E N T Y S I X O F F I F T Y J U M P E R S	24	113.4	34	114.9	DNQ	S T R O N G W I N D ___ R E S C E D U E D F R O M L I L L E H A M M E R ___ C O N V E R T E D T O P R O L O G U E	58	117.6	DNS	—	—	DNQ	—	—	464.3
65	(Russia) Aleksandr Bazhenov	51	95.0	DNS	—	—	DNQ	—	—	55	100.9	S T R O N G W I D ___ C A N C E L E D A F T E R T W E N T Y S I X O F F I F T Y J U M P E R S	52	97.9	DNQ	—	—	S T R O N G W I N D ___ R E S C E D U E D F R O M L I L L E H A M M E R ___ C O N V E R T E D T O P R O L O G U E	69	68.7	44	87.6	DNQ	DNQ	—	—	450.1
66	(Japan) Kento Sakuyama	55	91.6	DNS	—	—	DNQ	—	—	32	124.1	S T R O N G W I D ___ C A N C E L E D A F T E R T W E N T Y S I X O F F I F T Y J U M P E R S	58	91.5	DNQ	—	—	S T R O N G W I N D ___ R E S C E D U E D F R O M L I L L E H A M M E R ___ C O N V E R T E D T O P R O L O G U E	54	126.4	DNS	—	—	DNQ	—	—	433.6
67	(Kazakhstan) Marat Zhaparov	66	75.7	43	80.9	DNQ	DNQ	—	—	58	94.6	S T R O N G W I D ___ C A N C E L E D A F T E R T W E N T Y S I X O F F I F T Y J U M P E R S	61	83.0	DNQ	—	—	S T R O N G W I N D ___ R E S C E D U E D F R O M L I L L E H A M M E R ___ C O N V E R T E D T O P R O L O G U E	66	92.4	DNS	—	—	DNQ	—	—	426.6
68	(Russia) Mikhail Nazarov	DQ	—	DNS	—	—	DNQ	—	—	44	115.8	S T R O N G W I D ___ C A N C E L E D A F T E R T W E N T Y S I X O F F I F T Y J U M P E R S	60	87.2	DNQ	—	—	S T R O N G W I N D ___ R E S C E D U E D F R O M L I L L E H A M M E R ___ C O N V E R T E D T O P R O L O G U E	52	129.4	43	91.5	DNQ	DNQ	—	—	423.9
69	(Norway) Tom Hilde	29	113.7	DNS	—	—	48	78.0	DNQ	36	121.1	S T R O N G W I D ___ C A N C E L E D A F T E R T W E N T Y S I X O F F I F T Y J U M P E R S	DNS	—	DNS	—	—	S T R O N G W I N D ___ R E S C E D U E D F R O M L I L L E H A M M E R ___ C O N V E R T E D T O P R O L O G U E	61	110.9	DNS	—	—	DNQ	—	—	423.7
70	(Austria) Stefan Huber	DNS	—	DNS	—	—	DNQ	—	—	DNS	—	S T R O N G W I D ___ C A N C E L E D A F T E R T W E N T Y S I X O F F I F T Y J U M P E R S	DNS	—	DNS	—	—	S T R O N G W I N D ___ R E S C E D U E D F R O M L I L L E H A M M E R ___ C O N V E R T E D T O P R O L O G U E	35	151.4	DNS	—	—	29	159.8	84.8	396.0
71	(Finland) Eetu Nousiainen	DNS	—	DNS	—	—	DNS	—	—	DNS	—	S T R O N G W I D ___ C A N C E L E D A F T E R T W E N T Y S I X O F F I F T Y J U M P E R S	30	109.4	49	100.3	DNQ	S T R O N G W I N D ___ R E S C E D U E D F R O M L I L L E H A M M E R ___ C O N V E R T E D T O P R O L O G U E	63	106.5	46	74.1	DNQ	DNQ	—	—	390.3
72	(Italy) Roberto Dellasega	65	78.8	46	70.3	DNQ	DNQ	—	—	66	69.3	S T R O N G W I D ___ C A N C E L E D A F T E R T W E N T Y S I X O F F I F T Y J U M P E R S	64	64.8	DNQ	—	—	S T R O N G W I N D ___ R E S C E D U E D F R O M L I L L E H A M M E R ___ C O N V E R T E D T O P R O L O G U E	70	65.5	47	32.3	DNQ	DNQ	—	—	381.0
73	(Switzerland) Andreas Schuler	57	90.6	32	88.2	78.1	DNQ	—	—	65	70.9	S T R O N G W I D ___ C A N C E L E D A F T E R T W E N T Y S I X O F F I F T Y J U M P E R S	DNS	—	DNS	—	—	S T R O N G W I N D ___ R E S C E D U E D F R O M L I L L E H A M M E R ___ C O N V E R T E D T O P R O L O G U E	DNS	—	DNS	—	—	DNS	—	—	327.8
74	(Finland) Janne Ahonen	46	103.3	39	92.1	DNQ	48	78.0	DNQ	DNS	—	S T R O N G W I D ___ C A N C E L E D A F T E R T W E N T Y S I X O F F I F T Y J U M P E R S	DNS	—	DNS	—	—	S T R O N G W I N D ___ R E S C E D U E D F R O M L I L L E H A M M E R ___ C O N V E R T E D T O P R O L O G U E	DNS	—	DNS	—	—	DNS	—	—	273.4
75	(Kazakhstan) Sabyrżan Muminow	67	68.4	47	68.3	DNQ	DNQ	—	—	69	63.0	S T R O N G W I D ___ C A N C E L E D A F T E R T W E N T Y S I X O F F I F T Y J U M P E R S	DNQ	0.0	DNQ	—	—	S T R O N G W I N D ___ R E S C E D U E D F R O M L I L L E H A M M E R ___ C O N V E R T E D T O P R O L O G U E	72	53.5	DNS	—	—	DNQ	—	—	253.2
76	(Kazakhstan) Konstantin Sokolenko	68	57.5	48	57.7	DNQ	DNQ	—	—	DNS	—	S T R O N G W I D ___ C A N C E L E D A F T E R T W E N T Y S I X O F F I F T Y J U M P E R S	65	58.4	DNQ	—	—	S T R O N G W I N D ___ R E S C E D U E D F R O M L I L L E H A M M E R ___ C O N V E R T E D T O P R O L O G U E	71	60.5	DNS	—	—	DNQ	—	—	234.1
77	(Kazakhstan) Sergey Tkachenko	64	82.5	45	71.2	DNQ	DNQ	—	—	64	73.7	S T R O N G W I D ___ C A N C E L E D A F T E R T W E N T Y S I X O F F I F T Y J U M P E R S	DNS	—	DNS	—	—	S T R O N G W I N D ___ R E S C E D U E D F R O M L I L L E H A M M E R ___ C O N V E R T E D T O P R O L O G U E	DNS	—	DNS	—	—	DNS	—	—	227.4
78	(Poland) Stefan Hula Jr.	55	91.6	DNS	—	—	DNQ	—	—	31	125.9	S T R O N G W I D ___ C A N C E L E D A F T E R T W E N T Y S I X O F F I F T Y J U M P E R S	DNS	—	DNS	—	—	S T R O N G W I N D ___ R E S C E D U E D F R O M L I L L E H A M M E R ___ C O N V E R T E D T O P R O L O G U E	DNS	—	DNS	—	—	DNS	—	—	217.5
79	(Norway) Fredrik Bjerkeengen	58	89.1	DNS	—	—	DNQ	—	—	DNS	—	S T R O N G W I D ___ C A N C E L E D A F T E R T W E N T Y S I X O F F I F T Y J U M P E R S	DNS	—	DNS	—	—	S T R O N G W I N D ___ R E S C E D U E D F R O M L I L L E H A M M E R ___ C O N V E R T E D T O P R O L O G U E	60	115.0	DNS	—	—	DNQ	—	—	204.1
80	(Kazakhstan) Nikolay Karpenko	DNS	—	DNS	—	—	DNS	—	—	67	68.7	S T R O N G W I D ___ C A N C E L E D A F T E R T W E N T Y S I X O F F I F T Y J U M P E R S	63	66.5	DNQ	—	—	S T R O N G W I N D ___ R E S C E D U E D F R O M L I L L E H A M M E R ___ C O N V E R T E D T O P R O L O G U E	73	51.5	DNS	—	—	DNQ	—	—	186.3
81	(Turkey) Fatih Arda İpcioğlu	DNS	—	DNS	—	—	DNS	—	—	57	95.4	S T R O N G W I D ___ C A N C E L E D A F T E R T W E N T Y S I X O F F I F T Y J U M P E R S	DNS	—	DNS	—	—	S T R O N G W I N D ___ R E S C E D U E D F R O M L I L L E H A M M E R ___ C O N V E R T E D T O P R O L O G U E	DNS	—	DNS	—	—	DNS	—	—	95.4
82	(Norway) Richard Haukedal	61	87.7	DNS	—	—	DNQ	—	—	DNS	—	S T R O N G W I D ___ C A N C E L E D A F T E R T W E N T Y S I X O F F I F T Y J U M P E R S	DNS	—	DNS	—	—	S T R O N G W I N D ___ R E S C E D U E D F R O M L I L L E H A M M E R ___ C O N V E R T E D T O P R O L O G U E	DNS	—	DNS	—	—	DNS	—	—	87.7
83	(Norway) Sigurd Nymoen Søberg	63	84.7	DNS	—	—	DNQ	—	—	DNS	—	S T R O N G W I D ___ C A N C E L E D A F T E R T W E N T Y S I X O F F I F T Y J U M P E R S	DNS	—	DNS	—	—	S T R O N G W I N D ___ R E S C E D U E D F R O M L I L L E H A M M E R ___ C O N V E R T E D T O P R O L O G U E	DNS	—	DNS	—	—	DNS	—	—	84.7
	(Norway) Marius Lindvik	DQ	—	DNS	—	—	DNQ	—	—	DNS	—	S T R O N G W I D ___ C A N C E L E D A F T E R T W E N T Y S I X O F F I F T Y J U M P E R S	DNS	—	DNS	—	—	S T R O N G W I N D ___ R E S C E D U E D F R O M L I L L E H A M M E R ___ C O N V E R T E D T O P R O L O G U E	DNS	—	DNS	—	—	DNS	—	—	

competitor scored points in all rounds of the Tournament
