= 2016–17 FIS Ski Jumping World Cup =

Ski jumping championship season

Discipline	Men	Women
Overall	(Austria) Stefan Kraft	(Japan) Sara Takanashi
Nations Cup	Poland	Japan
Ski flying	(Austria) Stefan Kraft	—

Stage events
Raw Air	(Austria) Stefan Kraft	—
Four Hills Tournament	(Poland) Kamil Stoch	—

Competition
Edition	38th	6th
Locations	18	10
Individual	26	19
Team	6	—
Cancelled	1	0
Rescheduled	3	0

The 2016–17 FIS Ski Jumping World Cup was the 38th World Cup season in ski jumping for men, the 20th official World Cup season in ski flying and the 6th World Cup season for women.

Season began on 26 November 2016 in Kuusamo, Finland and ended on 26 March 2017 in Planica, Slovenia. And women's on 2 December 2016 in Lillehammer and ended on 12 March 2017 in Oslo.

The season calendar was officially confirmed two months later at the congress in Cancún, Mexico. After a 4-year absence, FIS Team Tour was almost certain to return in the WC calendar, but cancelled in the last moment when Klingenthal had to replace Titisee early in season.

First edition of the Raw Air was held in this season in Norway between 10 and 19 March on four different hills (Oslo, Lillehammer, Trondheim, and Vikersund). The competition lasted for ten consecutive days with a total of 16 rounds in overall standings: 8 rounds from four individual events, 4 rounds from two team events and all 4 qualifications rounds. With record high prize money of €100,000 in total for top 3 in overall: €60,000 for the title, €30,000 (second) and €10,000 (third place).

Invention by Slovenian manufacturer, with LED lights illuminated inrun track, was first time presented to the public at the International Ski Federation fall meeting this season in Zürich. It premiered in December at Engelberg, since they equipped their completely new inrun track with it.

This season had a total of four different ski brands suppliers. The two new ski manufactures premiered and replaced the two brands that stopped the production: Verivox replaced Fluege.de and Slovenian company Slatnar instead of Elan. And also Fischer and Sport 2000 were present.

26 men's individual events on 18 different venues in 9 countries and 19 women's individual events on 10 different venues in 8 countries had been organised on two different continents (Europe and Asia). There were also 6 men's team events.

South Korea (Pyeongchang) hosted World Cup for the first time, all as a preparation event for the next year Winter Olympics there.

== World records ==
List of world record distances achieved within this World Cup season.

Date	Athlete	Hill	Round	Place	Metres	Feet
18 March 2017	(Norway) Robert Johansson	Vikersundbakken HS225	Team – R1	Vikersund, Norway	252	827
18 March 2017	(Austria) Stefan Kraft	Vikersundbakken HS225	Team – R1	Vikersund, Norway	253.5	832

== Map of world cup hosts ==
Europe
Germany	Austria	Asia

== Men's Individual ==
=== Calendar ===
N – normal hill / L – large hill / F – flying hill
All	No.	Date	Place (Hill)	Size	Winner	Second	Third	Overall leader	R.
900	1	25 November 2016	(Finland) Ruka (Rukatunturi HS142)	L _{637}	(Slovenia) Domen Prevc	(Germany) Severin Freund	(Slovenia) Peter Prevc	(Slovenia) Domen Prevc	
901	2	26 November 2016	(Finland) Ruka (Rukatunturi HS142)	L _{638}	(Germany) Severin Freund	(Norway) Daniel-André Tande	(Austria) Manuel Fettner	(Germany) Severin Freund	
902	3	4 December 2016	(Germany) Klingenthal (Vogtland Arena HS140)	L _{639}	(Slovenia) Domen Prevc	(Norway) Daniel-André Tande	(Austria) Stefan Kraft	(Slovenia) Domen Prevc	
		10 December 2016	(Russia) Nizhny Tagil (Tramplin Stork HS134)	L _{cnx}	official calendar was changed and rescheduled to Lillehammer (organizers didn't install the wind net and pay the prize money on time)			—	
		11 December 2016	(Russia) Nizhny Tagil (Tramplin Stork HS134)	L _{cnx}	official calendar was changed and rescheduled to Lillehammer (organizers didn't install the wind net and pay the prize money on time)			—	
903	4	(Note: First men's cancelled individual event from Nizhny Tagil (10 December) was rescheduled to Lillehammer on same date.)10 December 2016	(Norway) Lillehammer (Lysgårdsbakken HS138)	L _{640}	(Slovenia) Domen Prevc	(Norway) Daniel-André Tande	(Austria) Stefan Kraft	(Slovenia) Domen Prevc	
904	5	(Note: Second men's cancelled individual event from Nizhny Tagil (11 December) was rescheduled to Lillehammer on same date.)11 December 2016	(Norway) Lillehammer (Lysgårdsbakken HS138)	L _{641}	(Poland) Kamil Stoch	(Poland) Maciej Kot	(Germany) Markus Eisenbichler	(Slovenia) Domen Prevc	
905	6	17 December 2016	(Switzerland) Engelberg (Gross-Titlis-Schanze HS140)	L _{642}	(Austria) Michael Hayböck	(Slovenia) Domen Prevc	(Austria) Andreas Kofler	(Slovenia) Domen Prevc	
906	7	18 December 2016	(Switzerland) Engelberg (Gross-Titlis-Schanze HS140)	L _{643}	(Slovenia) Domen Prevc	(Poland) Kamil Stoch	(Austria) Stefan Kraft	(Slovenia) Domen Prevc	
907	8	30 December 2016	(Germany) Oberstdorf (Schattenberg HS137)	L _{644}	(Austria) Stefan Kraft	(Poland) Kamil Stoch	(Austria) Michael Hayböck	(Slovenia) Domen Prevc	
908	9	1 January 2017	(Germany) Garmisch-Pa (Gr. Olympiaschanze HS140)	L _{645}	(Norway) Daniel-André Tande	(Poland) Kamil Stoch	(Austria) Stefan Kraft	(Slovenia) Domen Prevc	
909	10	(Note: Second round for men in Innsbruck (4 January) was canceled due to strong wind. Only first round counted as official result.)4 January 2017	(Austria) Innsbruck (Bergiselschanze HS130)	L _{646}	(Norway) Daniel-André Tande	(Norway) Robert Johansson	(Russia) Evgeniy Klimov	(Norway) D.-A. Tande	
910	11	6 January 2017	(Austria) Bischofshofen (Paul-Ausserleitner HS140)	L _{647}	(Poland) Kamil Stoch	(Austria) Michael Hayböck	(Poland) Piotr Żyła	(Slovenia) Domen Prevc	
65th Four Hills Tournament Overall (30 December 2016 – 6 January 2017)					(Poland) Kamil Stoch	(Poland) Piotr Żyła	(Norway) Daniel-André Tande	4H Tournament	
911	12	14 January 2017	(Poland) Wisła (Malinka HS134)	L _{648}	(Poland) Kamil Stoch	(Austria) Stefan Kraft	(Germany) Andreas Wellinger	(Poland) Kamil Stoch	
912	13	15 January 2017	(Poland) Wisła (Malinka HS134)	L _{649}	(Poland) Kamil Stoch	(Norway) Daniel-André Tande	(Slovenia) Domen Prevc	(Poland) Kamil Stoch	
913	14	22 January 2017	(Poland) Zakopane (Wielka Krokiew HS134)	L _{650}	(Poland) Kamil Stoch	(Germany) Andreas Wellinger	(Germany) Richard Freitag	(Poland) Kamil Stoch	
914	15	29 January 2017	(Germany) Willingen (Mühlenkopfschanze HS145	L _{651}	(Germany) Andreas Wellinger	(Austria) Stefan Kraft	(Austria) Manuel Fettner	(Poland) Kamil Stoch	
915	16	4 February 2017	(Germany) Oberstdorf (Heini-Klopfer HS225)	F _{111}	(Austria) Stefan Kraft	(Germany) Andreas Wellinger	(Poland) Kamil Stoch	(Poland) Kamil Stoch	
916	17	(Note: Second round of ski flying event in Oberstdorf (5 February) was canceled. Only one round counted.)5 February 2017	(Germany) Oberstdorf (Heini-Klopfer HS225)	F _{112}	(Austria) Stefan Kraft	(Germany) Andreas Wellinger	(Slovenia) Jurij Tepeš	(Poland) Kamil Stoch	
917	18	11 February 2017	(Japan) Sapporo (Ōkurayama HS137)	L _{652}	(Poland) Maciej Kot (Slovenia) Peter Prevc		(Austria) Stefan Kraft	(Poland) Kamil Stoch	
918	19	12 February 2017	(Japan) Sapporo (Ōkurayama HS137)	L _{653}	(Poland) Kamil Stoch	(Germany) Andreas Wellinger	(Austria) Stefan Kraft	(Poland) Kamil Stoch	
919	20	15 February 2017	(South Korea) Pyeongchang (Alpensia HS140)	L _{654}	(Austria) Stefan Kraft	(Germany) Andreas Wellinger	(Poland) Kamil Stoch	(Poland) Kamil Stoch	
920	21	(Note: Second men's individual event in Pyeongchang (16 February), scheduled at large hill, was moved to normal hill because of the strong wind.)16 February 2017	(South Korea) Pyeongchang (Alpensia HS140)	N _{154}	(Poland) Maciej Kot	(Austria) Stefan Kraft	(Germany) Andreas Wellinger	(Poland) Kamil Stoch	
FIS Nordic World Ski Championships 2017 (25 February – 2 March • (Finland) Lahti)
prologue		10 March 2017	(Norway) Oslo (Holmenkollbakken HS134)	L _{Qro}	(Germany) Andreas Wellinger	(Slovenia) Peter Prevc	(Germany) Richard Freitag	—	
team		11 March 2017	(Norway) Oslo (Holmenkollbakken HS134)	L _{T}	(Austria) Stefan Kraft	(Poland) Piotr Żyła	(Austria) Michael Hayböck	—	
921	22	12 March 2017	(Norway) Oslo (Holmenkollbakken HS134)	L _{655}	(Austria) Stefan Kraft	(Germany) Andreas Wellinger	(Germany) Markus Eisenbichler	(Austria) Stefan Kraft	
prologue		13 March 2017	(Norway) Lillehammer (Lysgårdsbakken HS138)	L _{Qro}	(Germany) Markus Eisenbichler	(Germany) Richard Freitag	(Austria) Stefan Kraft	—	
		14 March 2017	(Norway) Lillehammer (Lysgårdsbakken HS138)	L _{cnx}	cancelled due to strong wind (rescheduled to Vikersund on 17 March)			—	
prologue		15 March 2017	(Norway) Trondheim (Granåsen HS140)	L _{Qro}	(Poland) Kamil Stoch	(Norway) Andreas Stjernen	(Germany) Andreas Wellinger	—	
922	23	16 March 2017	(Norway) Trondheim (Granåsen HS140)	L _{656}	(Austria) Stefan Kraft	(Norway) Andreas Stjernen	(Germany) Andreas Wellinger	(Austria) Stefan Kraft	
		(Note: Canceled individual event from Lillehammer (14 December) was rescheduled to a ski flying hill in Vikersund (17 March) as a one-round only event.)17 March 2017	(Norway) Vikersund (Vikersundbakken HS225)	F _{cnx}	one-round substitute competition cancelled due to strong (replaced with originally scheduled prologue/qualifications)			—	
prologue		17 March 2017	(Norway) Vikersund (Vikersundbakken HS225)	F _{Qro}	originally scheduled prologue planned to be moved on 18 March (but as Lillehammer substitute event cancelled returned to original date)			—	
prologue		17 March 2017	(Norway) Vikersund (Vikersundbakken HS225)	F _{Qro}	(Poland) Kamil Stoch	(Germany) Andreas Wellinger	(Slovenia) Domen Prevc	—	
prologue		18 March 2017	(Norway) Vikersund (Vikersundbakken HS225)	F _{Qro}	rescheduled prologue returned to original date on 17 March (as then rescheduled Lillehammer got cancelled)			—	
team		18 March 2017	(Norway) Vikersund (Vikersundbakken HS225)	F _{T}	(Austria) Stefan Kraft	(Poland) Kamil Stoch	(Germany) Andreas Wellinger	—	
923	24	19 March 2017	(Norway) Vikersund (Vikersundbakken HS225)	F _{113}	(Poland) Kamil Stoch	(Japan) Noriaki Kasai	(Austria) Michael Hayböck	(Austria) Stefan Kraft	
1st Raw Air Overall; TWO TEAM EVENTS INCLUDED (10 – 19 March 2017)					(Austria) Stefan Kraft	(Poland) Kamil Stoch	(Germany) Andreas Wellinger	Raw Air	
924	25	24 March 2017	(Slovenia) Planica (Letalnica b. Gorišek HS225)	F _{114}	(Austria) Stefan Kraft	(Germany) Andreas Wellinger	(Germany) Markus Eisenbichler	(Austria) Stefan Kraft	
925	26	(Note: Final round of the event in Planica (26 March) was cancelled due to strong wind. Only one round counted.)26 March 2017	(Slovenia) Planica (Letalnica b. Gorišek HS225)	F _{115}	(Austria) Stefan Kraft	(Germany) Andreas Wellinger	(Japan) Noriaki Kasai	(Austria) Stefan Kraft	
38th FIS World Cup Men's Overall (25 November 2016 – 26 March 2017)					(Austria) Stefan Kraft	(Poland) Kamil Stoch	(Norway) Daniel-André Tande	World Cup Overall	

=== Standings ===
==== Overall ====
Rank	after 26 events	Points
1	(Austria) Stefan Kraft	1665
2	(Poland) Kamil Stoch	1524
3	(Norway) Daniel-André Tande	1201
4	(Germany) Andreas Wellinger	1161
5	(Poland) Maciej Kot	985
6	(Slovenia) Domen Prevc	963
7	(Austria) Michael Hayböck	814
8	(Germany) Markus Eisenbichler	807
9	(Slovenia) Peter Prevc	716
10	(Austria) Manuel Fettner	703

==== Nations Cup ====
Rank	after 32 events	Points
1	Poland	5833
2	Austria	5586
3	Germany	5513
4	Norway	4415
5	Slovenia	3713
6	Japan	1555
7	Czech Republic	1029
8	Russia	741
9	France	386
10	Switzerland	306

==== Prize money ====
Rank	after 32 events	CHF
1	(Austria) Stefan Kraft	188,500
2	(Poland) Kamil Stoch	187,400
3	(Germany) Andreas Wellinger	144,600
4	(Poland) Maciej Kot	132,500
5	(Norway) Daniel-André Tande	127,350
6	(Germany) Markus Eisenbichler	109,200
7	(Austria) Michael Hayböck	103,400
8	(Slovenia) Domen Prevc	100,600
9	(Poland) Piotr Żyła	98,050
10	(Austria) Manuel Fettner	91,900

==== Ski Flying ====
Rank	after 5 events	Points
1	(Austria) Stefan Kraft	445
2	(Germany) Andreas Wellinger	333
3	(Poland) Kamil Stoch	279
4	(Japan) Noriaki Kasai	230
5	(Slovenia) Peter Prevc	196
6	(Austria) Michael Hayböck	184
7	(Germany) Markus Eisenbichler	151
8	(Slovenia) Jurij Tepeš	144
9	(Slovenia) Domen Prevc	138
10	(Poland) Piotr Żyła	129

==== Four Hills Tournament ====
Rank	after 4 events	Points
1	(Poland) Kamil Stoch	997.8
2	(Poland) Piotr Żyła	962.5
3	(Norway) Daniel-André Tande	941.8
4	(Poland) Maciej Kot	934.3
5	(Austria) Manuel Fettner	926.8
6	(Austria) Stefan Kraft	926.5
7	(Germany) Markus Eisenbichler	924.4
8	(Germany) Stephan Leyhe	911.1
9	(Slovenia) Domen Prevc	908.8
10	(Norway) Andreas Stjernen	900.3

==== Raw Air ====
Rank	after 9 events	Points
1	(Austria) Stefan Kraft	2298.1
2	(Poland) Kamil Stoch	2272.6
3	(Germany) Andreas Wellinger	2251.3
4	(Norway) Andreas Stjernen	2210.1
5	(Slovenia) Peter Prevc	2180.4
6	(Norway) Johann André Forfang	2160.4
7	(Poland) Maciej Kot	2102.9
8	(Japan) Noriaki Kasai	2099.0
9	(Norway) Robert Johansson	2090.7
10	(Japan) Daiki Itō	2082.2

== Women's Individual ==
=== Calendar ===
N – normal hill / L – large hill
All	No.	Date	Place (Hill)	Size	Winner	Second	Third	Overall leader	R.
78	1	2 December 2016	(Norway) Lillehammer (Lysgårdsbakken HS100)	N _{073}	(Japan) Sara Takanashi	(Japan) Yūki Itō	(Germany) Anna Rupprecht	(Japan) Sara Takanashi	
79	2	3 December 2016	(Norway) Lillehammer (Lysgårdsbakken HS100)	N _{074}	(Japan) Sara Takanashi	(Japan) Yūki Itō	(Austria) J. Seifriedsberger	(Japan) Sara Takanashi	
80	3	10 December 2016	(Russia) Nizhny Tagil (Tramplin Stork HS100)	N _{075}	(Norway) Maren Lundby	(Austria) Daniela Iraschko-Stolz	(Japan) Sara Takanashi	(Japan) Sara Takanashi	
81	4	11 December 2016	(Russia) Nizhny Tagil (Tramplin Stork HS100)	N _{076}	(Japan) Sara Takanashi	(Austria) Daniela Iraschko-Stolz	(Austria) J. Seifriedsberger	(Japan) Sara Takanashi	
82	5	7 January 2017	(Germany) Oberstdorf (Schattenberg HS137)	L _{006}	(Japan) Sara Takanashi	(Russia) Irina Avvakumova	(Japan) Yūki Itō	(Japan) Sara Takanashi	
83	6	8 January 2017	(Germany) Oberstdorf (Schattenberg HS137)	L _{007}	(Japan) Sara Takanashi	(Slovenia) Ema Klinec	(Russia) Irina Avvakumova	(Japan) Sara Takanashi	
84	7	14 January 2017	(Japan) Sapporo (Miyanomori HS100)	N _{077}	(Japan) Yūki Itō	(Japan) Sara Takanashi	(Norway) Maren Lundby	(Japan) Sara Takanashi	
85	8	15 January 2017	(Japan) Sapporo (Miyanomori HS100)	N _{078}	(Norway) Maren Lundby	(Japan) Yūki Itō	(Germany) Katharina Althaus	(Japan) Sara Takanashi	
86	9	20 January 2017	(Japan) Zaō (Yamagata HS103)	N _{079}	(Japan) Yūki Itō	(Italy) Manuela Malsiner	(Russia) Irina Avvakumova	(Japan) Sara Takanashi	
87	10	21 January 2017	(Japan) Zaō (Yamagata HS103)	N _{080}	(Japan) Yūki Itō	(Japan) Sara Takanashi	(Norway) Maren Lundby	(Japan) Sara Takanashi	
88	11	28 January 2017	(Romania) Râșnov (Trambulina Valea HS100)	N _{081}	(Norway) Maren Lundby	(Japan) Sara Takanashi	(Japan) Yūki Itō	(Japan) Sara Takanashi	
89	12	29 January 2017	(Romania) Râșnov (Trambulina Valea HS100)	N _{082}	(Japan) Sara Takanashi	(Norway) Maren Lundby	(Austria) Daniela Iraschko-Stolz	(Japan) Sara Takanashi	
90	13	4 February 2017	(Austria) Hinzenbach (Aigner-Schanze HS94)	N _{083}	(Japan) Sara Takanashi	(Germany) Katharina Althaus	(Germany) Carina Vogt	(Japan) Sara Takanashi	
91	14	5 February 2017	(Austria) Hinzenbach (Aigner-Schanze HS94)	N _{084}	(Japan) Sara Takanashi	(Germany) Carina Vogt	(Norway) Maren Lundby	(Japan) Sara Takanashi	
92	15	11 February 2017	(Slovenia) Ljubno (Savina HS95)	N _{085}	(Norway) Maren Lundby	(Austria) Daniela Iraschko-Stolz	(Germany) Katharina Althaus	(Japan) Sara Takanashi	
93	16	12 February 2017	(Slovenia) Ljubno (Savina HS95)	N _{086}	(Germany) Katharina Althaus	(Germany) Carina Vogt	(Germany) Svenja Würth	(Japan) Sara Takanashi	
94	17	15 February 2017	(South Korea) Pyeongchang (Alpensia HS109)	N _{087}	(Japan) Yūki Itō	(Japan) Sara Takanashi	(Slovenia) Ema Klinec	(Japan) Sara Takanashi	
95	18	16 February 2017	(South Korea) Pyeongchang (Alpensia HS109)	N _{088}	(Japan) Sara Takanashi	(Japan) Yūki Itō	(Norway) Maren Lundby	(Japan) Sara Takanashi	
FIS Nordic World Ski Championships 2017 (24 February • (Finland) Lahti)
96	19	12 March 2017	(Norway) Oslo (Holmenkollbakken HS134)	L _{008}	(Japan) Yūki Itō	(Japan) Sara Takanashi	(Norway) Maren Lundby	(Japan) Sara Takanashi	
6th FIS World Cup Women's Overall (2 December 2016 – 12 March 2017)					(Japan) Sara Takanashi	(Japan) Yūki Itō	(Norway) Maren Lundby	World Cup Overall	

=== Standings ===
==== Overall ====
Rank	after 19 events	Points
1	(Japan) Sara Takanashi	1455
2	(Japan) Yūki Itō	1208
3	(Norway) Maren Lundby	1109
4	(Germany) Katharina Althaus	776
5	(Germany) Carina Vogt	723
6	(Austria) Daniela Iraschko-Stolz	717
7	(Slovenia) Ema Klinec	630
8	(Austria) J. Seifriedsberger	544
9	(Russia) Irina Avvakumova	531
10	(Germany) Svenja Würth	497

==== Nations Cup ====
Rank	after 19 events	Points
1	Japan	3357
2	Germany	2685
3	Slovenia	1674
4	Austria	1651
5	Norway	1140
6	Russia	921
7	United States	757
8	Italy	576
9	France	454
10	Finland	229

==== Prize money ====
Rank	after 19 events	CHF
1	(Japan) Sara Takanashi	43,650
2	(Japan) Yūki Itō	36,240
3	(Norway) Maren Lundby	33,000
4	(Germany) Katharina Althaus	23,220
5	(Austria) Daniela Iraschko-Stolz	21,450
6	(Germany) Carina Vogt	21,390
7	(Slovenia) Ema Klinec	18,825
8	(Austria) J. Seifriedsberger	16,245
9	(Russia) Irina Avvakumova	15,930
10	(Germany) Svenja Würth	14,910

== Team events ==
=== Calendar ===
All	No.	Date	Place (Hill)	Size	Winner	Second	Third	R.
Men's team
82	1	3 December 2016	(Germany) Klingenthal (Vogtland Arena HS140)	L _{063}	Poland Piotr Żyła; Kamil Stoch; Dawid Kubacki; Maciej Kot	Germany Markus Eisenbichler; Andreas Wellinger; Richard Freitag; Severin Freund	Austria Michael Hayböck; Stefan Kraft; Andreas Kofler; Manuel Fettner	
83	2	21 January 2017	(Poland) Zakopane (Wielka Krokiew HS134)	L _{064}	Germany Markus Eisenbichler; Andreas Wellinger; Stephan Leyhe; Richard Freitag	Poland Piotr Żyła; Maciej Kot; Dawid Kubacki; Kamil Stoch	Slovenia Jurij Tepeš; Peter Prevc; Jernej Damjan; Domen Prevc	
84	3	28 January 2017	(Germany) Willingen (Mühlenkopfschanze HS145)	L _{065}	Poland Piotr Żyła; Dawid Kubacki; Maciej Kot; Kamil Stoch	Austria Michael Hayböck; Manuel Fettner; Gregor Schlierenzauer; Stefan Kraft	Germany Markus Eisenbichler; Stephan Leyhe; Andreas Wellinger; Richard Freitag	
85	4	11 March 2017	(Norway) Oslo (Holmenkollbakken HS134)	L _{066}	Austria Michael Hayböck; Manuel Fettner; Markus Schiffner; Stefan Kraft	Germany Markus Eisenbichler; Stephan Leyhe; Richard Freitag; Andreas Wellinger	Poland Piotr Żyła; Kamil Stoch; Dawid Kubacki; Maciej Kot	
86	5	18 March 2017	(Norway) Vikersund (Vikersundbakken HS225)	F _{018}	Norway Daniel-André Tande; Robert Johansson; Johann André Forfang; Andreas Stjernen	Poland Piotr Żyła; Dawid Kubacki; Maciej Kot; Kamil Stoch	Austria Michael Hayböck; Manuel Fettner; Gregor Schlierenzauer; Stefan Kraft	
87	6	25 March 2017	(Slovenia) Planica (Letalnica bratov Gorišek HS225)	F _{019}	Norway Robert Johansson; Johann André Forfang; Anders Fannemel; Andreas Stjernen	Germany Markus Eisenbichler; Richard Freitag; Karl Geiger; Andreas Wellinger	Poland Piotr Żyła; Dawid Kubacki; Maciej Kot; Kamil Stoch	

== Qualifications ==
=== Men ===
No.	Place	Qualifications	Competition	Size	Winner
1	(Finland) Ruka	24 November 2016	25 November 2016	L	(Poland) Maciej Kot
2	(Finland) Ruka	26 November 2016		L	(Norway) Daniel-André Tande
3	(Germany) Klingenthal	2 December 2016	4 December 2016	L	(Poland) Kamil Stoch
4	(Norway) Lillehammer	9 December 2016	10 December 2016	L	(Poland) Kamil Stoch
5	(Norway) Lillehammer	11 December 2016		L	(Slovenia) Peter Prevc
6	(Switzerland) Engelberg	16 December 2016	17 December 2016	L	(Austria) Michael Hayböck
7	(Switzerland) Engelberg	18 December 2016		L	(Germany) Andreas Wellinger
8	(Germany) Oberstdorf	29 December 2016	30 December 2016	L	(Norway) Daniel-André Tande
9	(Germany) Garmisch-Pa	31 December 2016	1 January 2017	L	(Germany) Markus Eisenbichler
10	(Austria) Innsbruck	3 January 2017	4 January 2017	L	(Austria) Stefan Kraft
11	(Austria) Bischofshofen	5 January 2017	6 January 2017	L	(Germany) Andreas Wellinger
12	(Poland) Wisła	13 January 2017	14 January 2017	L	(Germany) Richard Freitag
13	(Poland) Wisła	15 January 2017		L	(Austria) Gregor Schlierenzauer
14	(Poland) Zakopane	20 January 2017	22 January 2017	L	(Germany) Stephan Leyhe
15	(Germany) Willingen	27 January 2017	29 January 2017	L	(Germany) Andreas Wellinger
16	(Germany) Oberstdorf	3 February 2017	4 February 2017	F	(Slovenia) Peter Prevc
17	(Germany) Oberstdorf	5 February 2017		F	(Poland) Maciej Kot
18	(Japan) Sapporo	10 February 2017	11 February 2017	L	(Slovenia) Peter Prevc
19	(Japan) Sapporo	12 February 2017		L	(Poland) Dawid Kubacki
20	(South Korea) Pyeongchang	14 February 2017	15 February 2017	L	(Poland) Jan Ziobro
21	(South Korea) Pyeongchang	16 February 2017		N	(Germany) Karl Geiger
22	(Norway) Oslo	10 March 2017	12 March 2017	L	(Germany) Richard Freitag
23	(Norway) Lillehammer	13 March 2017	14 March 2017	L	(Germany) Richard Freitag
24	(Norway) Trondheim	15 March 2017	16 March 2017	L	(Norway) Andreas Stjernen
25	(Norway) Vikersund	17 March 2017	19 March 2017	F	(Japan) Noriaki Kasai
26	(Slovenia) Planica	23 March 2017	24 March 2017	F	(Norway) Robert Johansson

=== Women ===
No.	Place	Qualifications	Competition	Size	Winner
1	(Norway) Lillehammer	1 December 2016	2 December 2016	N	(Germany) Katharina Althaus
2	(Norway) Lillehammer	3 December 2016		N	(France) Lucile Morat
3	(Russia) Nizhny Tagil (Note: Women's qualifications in Nizhny Tagil are postponed from 9 to 10 December. Some skis did not arrive in Russia on time.)	10 December 2016		N	(Norway) Maren Lundby
4	(Russia) Nizhny Tagil	11 December 2016		N	(Italy) Elena Runggaldier
5	(Germany) Oberstdorf	6 January 2017	7 January 2017	L	(Austria) Chiara Hölzl
6	(Germany) Oberstdorf	8 January 2017		L	(United States) Nita Englund
7	(Japan) Sapporo	13 January 2017	14 January 2017	N	(Japan) Yūka Setō
8	(Japan) Sapporo	15 January 2017		N	(Germany) Svenja Würth
9	(Japan) Zaō	19 January 2017	20 January 2017	N	(Germany) Svenja Würth
10	(Japan) Zaō	21 January 2017		N	(Italy) Lara Malsiner
	(Romania) Râșnov	27 January 2017	28 January 2017	N	only 41 competitors applied and all competed in main event
	(Romania) Râșnov	29 January 2017		N	only 41 competitors applied and all competed in main event
	(Austria) Hinzenbach	3 February 2017	4 February 2017	N	only 40 competitors applied and all competed in main event
	(Austria) Hinzenbach	5 February 2017		N	only 40 competitors applied and all competed in main event
11	(Slovenia) Ljubno	11 February 2017		N	(Russia) Anastasiya Barannikova
12	(Slovenia) Ljubno	12 February 2017		N	(Russia) Anastasiya Barannikova
	(South Korea) Pyeongchang	15 February 2017		N	only 32 competitors applied and all competed in main event
	(South Korea) Pyeongchang	16 February 2017		N	only 32 competitors applied and all competed in main event

== Participants ==
Overall, a total of 22 countries for both men and ladies participated in this season:

Asia (4)
China; Japan	South Korea; Kazakhstan
Europe (16)
Austria; Bulgaria; Czech Republic; Estonia; Finland; France; Germany; Italy	Norway; Poland; Romania; Russia; Slovenia; Ukraine; Switzerland; Turkey
North America (2)
Canada	United States

== Achievements ==
First World Cup career victory

- (Slovenia) Domen Prevc (17), in his second season – the WC 1 in Ruka
- (Norway) Maren Lundby (22), in her sixth season – the WC 3 in Nizhny Tagil
- (Japan) Yūki Itō (22), in her sixth season – the WC 7 in Sapporo
- (Poland) Maciej Kot (25), in his tenth season – the WC 18 in Sapporo
- (Germany) Katharina Althaus (20), in her sixth season – the WC 16 in Ljubno

First World Cup podium

- (Germany) Anna Rupprecht (20), in her sixth season – the WC 1 in Lillehammer
- (Germany) Markus Eisenbichler (25), in his sixth season – the WC 5 in Lillehammer
- (Poland) Maciej Kot (25), in his tenth season – the WC 5 in Lillehammer
- (Russia) Evgeni Klimov (22), in his second season – the WC 10 in Innsbruck
- (Norway) Robert Johansson (26), in his fourth season – the WC 10 in Innsbruck
- (Germany) Katharina Althaus (20), in her sixth season – the WC 8 in Sapporo
- (Italy) Manuela Malsiner (19), in her fourth season – the WC 9 in Zao
- (Germany) Svenja Würth (23), in her sixth season – the WC 16 in Ljubno

Number of wins this season (in brackets are all-time wins)

- (Japan) Sara Takanashi – 9 (53)
- (Austria) Stefan Kraft – 8 (12)
- (Poland) Kamil Stoch – 7 (22)
- (Japan) Yūki Itō – 5 (5)
- (Slovenia) Domen Prevc – 4 (4)
- (Norway) Maren Lundby – 4 (4)
- (Norway) Daniel-André Tande – 2 (3)
- (Poland) Maciej Kot – 2 (2)
- (Germany) Severin Freund – 1 (22)
- (Slovenia) Peter Prevc – 1 (22)
- (Austria) Michael Hayböck – 1 (5)
- (Germany) Andreas Wellinger – 1 (2)
- (Germany) Katharina Althaus – 1 (1)

== See also ==
- 2016 Grand Prix (top level summer series)
- 2016–17 FIS Continental Cup (2nd level competition)
