= Sport 2000 =

Italian aircraft manufacturer

- Company type: Privately held company
- Industry: Aerospace
- Founded: circa 2001
- Defunct: circa 2005
- Headquarters: Capena, Italy
- Key people: Pietrucci Mauro
- Products: Paramotors

Sport 2000 Paramotori was an Italian aircraft manufacturer based in Capena and founded by Pietrucci Mauro. The company specialized in the design and manufacture of paramotors in the form of ready-to-fly aircraft for the US FAR 103 Ultralight Vehicles rules and the European microlight category.

The company seems to have been founded about 2001 and gone out of business in 2005.

Sport 2000 produced the Model 80 paramotor in two sub-variants, the LM and AM, the LM having more endurance.

== Aircraft ==
Summary of aircraft built by Sport 2000
Model name	First flight	Number built	Type
Sport 2000 80	2000s		paramotor
