= Markus Eisenbichler =

German ski jumper (born 1991)

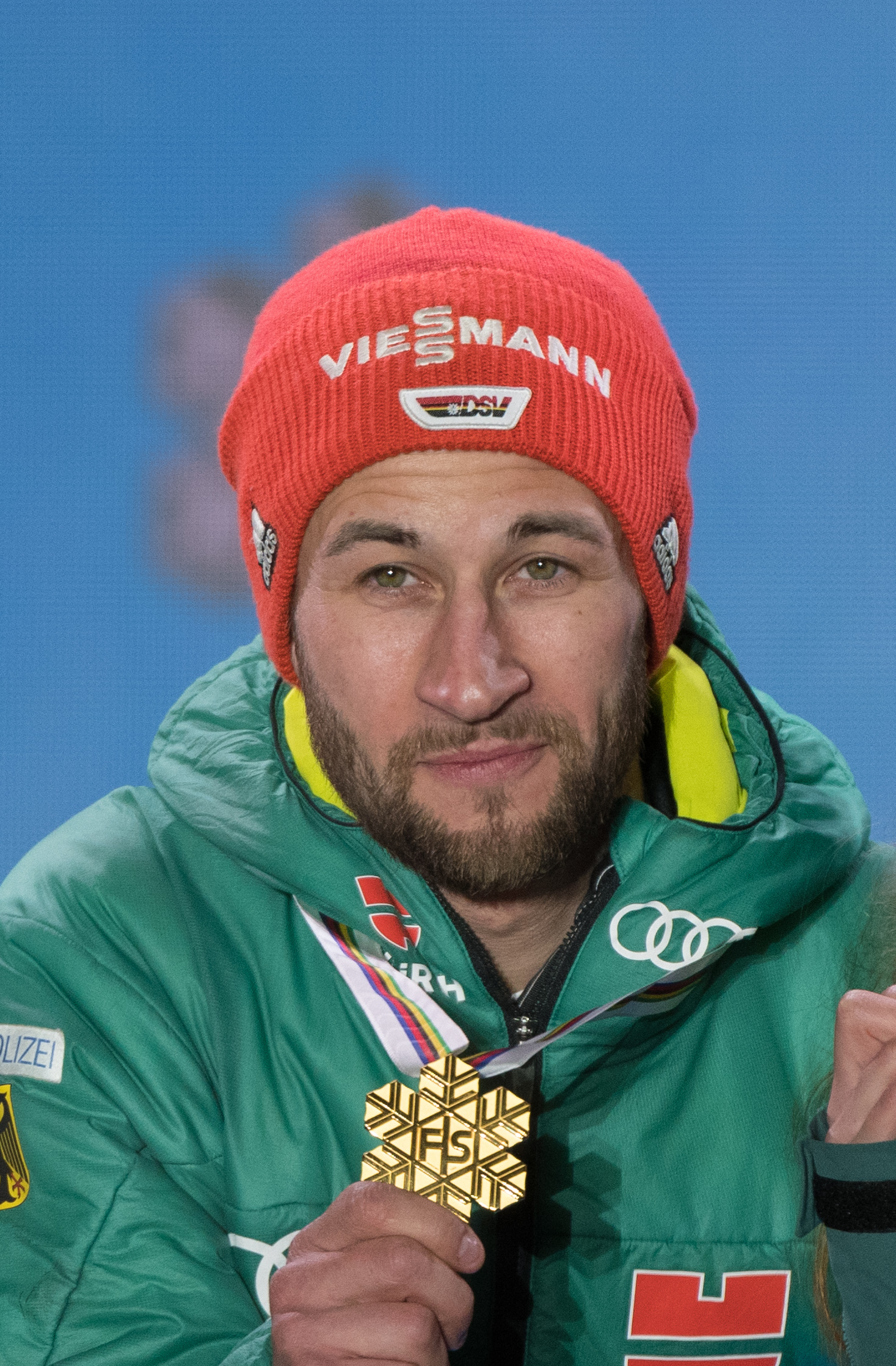
- Eisenbichler at the 2019 World Championships in Seefeld

Personal information
- Nationality: Germany
- Born: 3 April 1991 (age 35) Siegsdorf, Germany
- Height: 1.75 m (5 ft 9 in)

Sport
- Sport: Skiing
- Club: TSV Siegsdorf

World Cup career
- Seasons: 2011–2025
- Indiv. starts: 220
- Indiv. podiums: 28
- Indiv. wins: 3
- Team starts: 40
- Team podiums: 26
- Team wins: 8

Achievements and titles
- Personal bests: 248 m (814 ft); Planica, 25 March 2017
Medal record
Representing Germany
Men's ski jumping
Olympic Games
Bronze medal – third place	2022 Beijing	Team LH
World Championships
Gold medal – first place	2017 Lahti	Mixed team NH
Gold medal – first place	2019 Seefeld	Individual LH
Gold medal – first place	2019 Seefeld	Team LH
Gold medal – first place	2019 Seefeld	Mixed team NH
Gold medal – first place	2021 Oberstdorf	Mixed team NH
Gold medal – first place	2021 Oberstdorf	Team LH
Bronze medal – third place	2017 Lahti	Individual NH
Men's ski flying
Ski Flying World Championships
Silver medal – second place	2020 Planica	Team
Silver medal – second place	2022 Vikersund	Team
Bronze medal – third place	2020 Planica	Individual
- Updated on 25 February 2022

Markus Eisenbichler (born 3 April 1991) is a German former ski jumper, current World Champion in team champion, team mixed competition and former World Champion on the large hill.

== Career ==
His FIS Ski Jumping World Cup debut took place in December 2011 at the Four Hills Tournament in Oberstdorf. On 23 February 2019, Eisenbichler became the individual world champion on large hill in Seefeld in Tirol. Later he won another two gold World Championship medals in the team event and mixed team event. On 22 March 2019, he achieved his long-awaited first World Cup win during the Ski Flying event in Planica. Also, in Planica on 12 December 2020, he won the bronze medal of the 2020 Ski Flying World Championships.

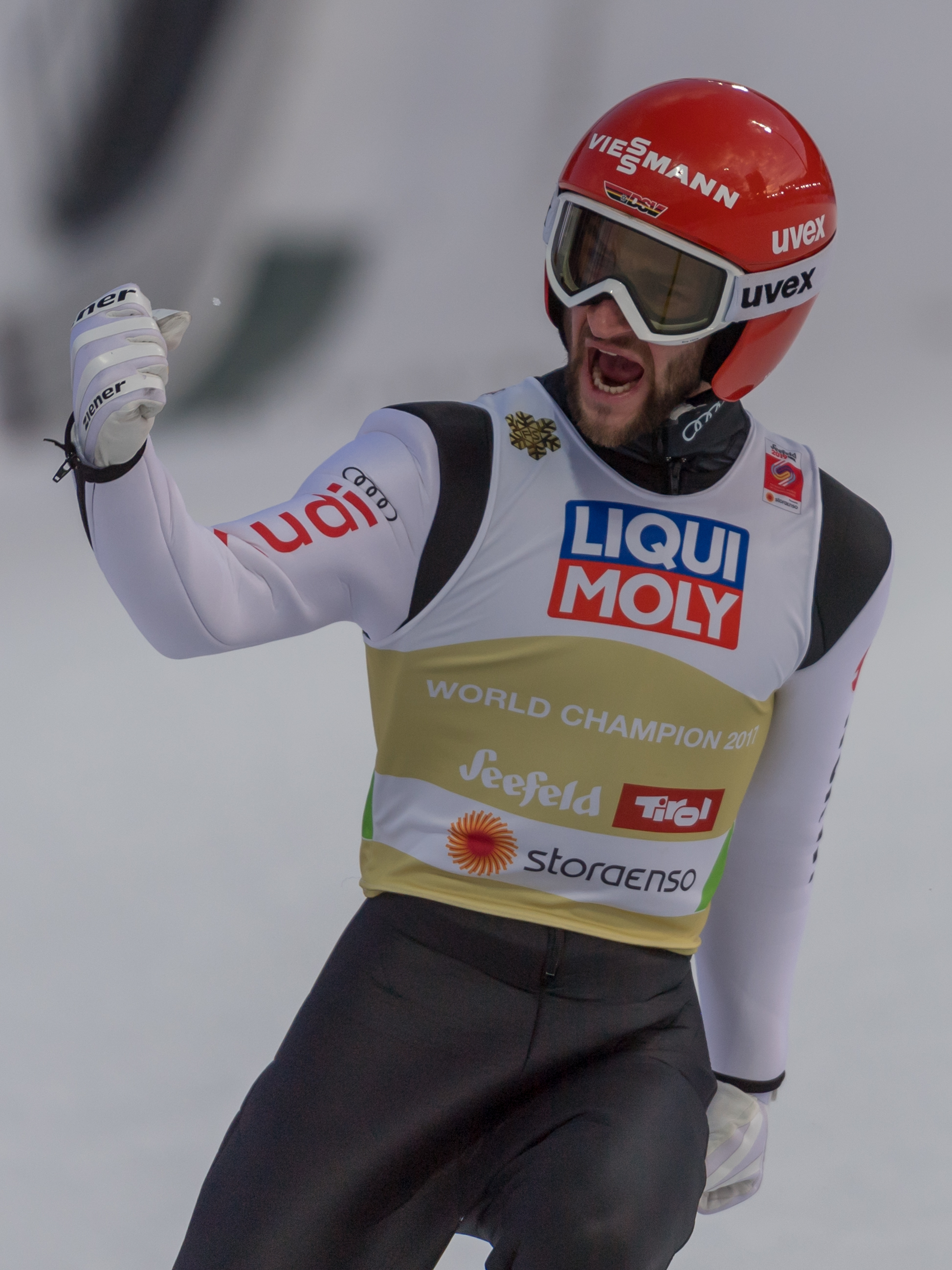
Markus Eisenbichler at the FIS Nordic World Ski Championships.

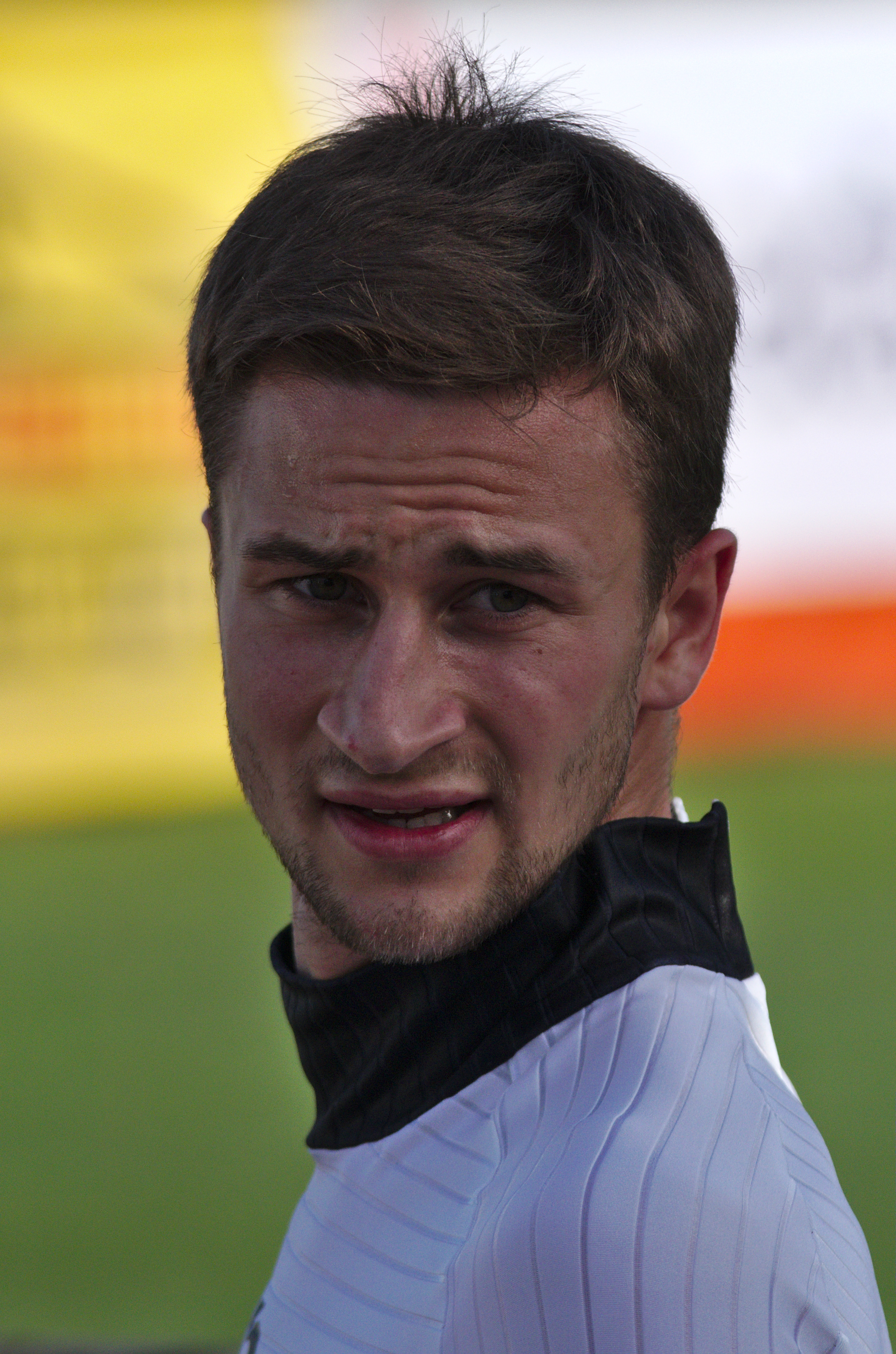
Eisenbichler in 2014.

== Record ==
=== Olympic Games ===
Event	Normal hill	Large hill	Team LH
(South Korea) 2018 Pyeongchang	8	14	–
(China) 2022 Beijing	31	5	3rd place, bronze medalist(s)

=== World Championships ===
Event	Normal hill	Large hill	Team LH	Mixed Team NH
(Sweden) 2015 Falun	–	10	5	–
(Finland) 2017 Lahti	3rd place, bronze medalist(s)	13	4	1st place, gold medalist(s)
(Austria) 2019 Seefeld	7	1st place, gold medalist(s)	1st place, gold medalist(s)	1st place, gold medalist(s)
(Germany) 2021 Oberstdorf	17	17	1st place, gold medalist(s)	1st place, gold medalist(s)
(Slovenia) 2023 Planica	13	5	5	

=== FIS Ski Flying World Championships ===
Event	Individual	Team
(Czech Republic) 2014 Harrachov	38	Cancelled
(Germany) 2018 Oberstdorf	11	4
(Slovenia) 2020 Planica	3rd place, bronze medalist(s)	2nd place, silver medalist(s)
(Norway) 2022 Vikersund	18	2nd place, silver medalist(s)

== World Cup ==
=== Season standings ===
Season				Tour Standings			
Season	Overall	4H	SF	RA	W6	T5	P7
2011/12	71	54	—	N/A	N/A	N/A	N/A
2013/14	44	59	—	N/A	N/A	N/A	N/A
2014/15	15	50	14	N/A	N/A	N/A	N/A
2015/16	39	63	25	N/A	N/A	N/A	N/A
2016/17	8	7	7	16	N/A	N/A	N/A
2017/18	10	7	10	9	8	N/A	6
2018/19	7	2nd place, silver medalist(s)	2nd place, silver medalist(s)	4	25	N/A	2nd place, silver medalist(s)
2019/20	23	15	24	31	22	—	N/A
2020/21	2nd place, silver medalist(s)	16	3rd place, bronze medalist(s)	N/A	3rd place, bronze medalist(s)	N/A	3rd place, bronze medalist(s)

=== Individual wins ===
No.	Season	Date	Location	Hill	Size
1	2018/19	22 March 2019	(Slovenia) Planica	Letalnica bratov Gorišek HS240	FH
2	2020/21	22 November 2020	(Poland) Wisła	Malinka HS134 (night)	LH
3	2020/21	28 November 2020	(Finland) Ruka	Rukatunturi HS142 (night)	LH

=== Individual starts ===
Season	1	2	3	4	5	6	7	8	9	10	11	12	13	14	15	16	17	18	19	20	21	22	23	24	25	26	27	28	29	30	31	Points
2009/10	Kuusamo	Lillehammer	Lillehammer	Engelberg	Engelberg	Engelberg	Oberstdorf	Garmisch-Partenkirchen	Innsbruck	Bischofshofen	Bad Mitterndorf	Bad Mitterndorf	Sapporo	Sapporo	Zakopane	Zakopane	Oberstdorf	Klingenthal	Willingen	Lahti	Kuopio	Lillehammer	Oslo									0
2009/10	–	–	–	–	–	–	–	–	–	–	–	–	–	–	–	–	–	q	–	–	–	–	–									0
2011/12	Kuusamo	Lillehammer	Lillehammer	Harrachov	Harrachov	Engelberg	Engelberg	Oberstdorf	Garmisch-Partenkirchen	Innsbruck	Bischofshofen	Bad Mitterndorf	Bad Mitterndorf	Zakopane	Zakopane	Sapporo	Sapporo	Predazzo	Predazzo	Willingen	Oberstdorf	Lahti	Trondheim	Oslo	Planica	Planica						1
2011/12	–	–	–	–	–	–	–	30	q	–	–	48	50	–	–	–	–	–	–	–	–	–	–	–	–	–						1
2013/14	Klingenthal	Kuusamo	Lillehammer	Lillehammer	Titisee-Neustadt	Titisee-Neustadt	Engelberg	Engelberg	Oberstdorf	Garmisch-Partenkirchen	Innsbruck	Bischofshofen	Tauplitz	Tauplitz	Wisła	Zakopane	Sapporo	Sapporo	Willingen	Willingen	Falun	Lahti	Lahti	Kuopio	Trondheim	Oslo	Planica	Planica				99
2013/14	–	–	–	–	–	–	–	–	q	45	–	–	–	–	–	–	8	8	11	35	–	–	–	–	q	29	q	22				99
2014/15	Klingenthal	Kuusamo	Kuusamo	Lillehammer	Lillehammer	Nizhny Tagil	Nizhny Tagil	Engelberg	Engelberg	Oberstdorf	Garmisch-Partenkirchen	Innsbruck	Bischofshofen	Tauplitz	Wisła	Zakopane	Sapporo	Sapporo	Willingen	Willingen	Titisee-Neustadt	Titisee-Neustadt	Vikersund	Vikersund	Lahti	Kuopio	Trondheim	Oslo	Oslo	Planica	Planica	529
2014/15	8	12	11	40	8	14	21	8	6	44	q	q	32	9	6	14	31	13	12	13	12	15	13	8	19	15	q	7	24	31	22	529
2015/16	Klingenthal	Lillehammer	Lillehammer	Nizhny Tagil	Nizhny Tagil	Engelberg	Engelberg	Oberstdorf	Garmisch-Partenkirchen	Innsbruck	Bischofshofen	Willingen	Zakopane	Sapporo	Sapporo	Trondheim	Vikersund	Vikersund	Vikersund	Lahti	Lahti	Kuopio	Almaty	Almaty	Wisła	Titisee-Neustadt	Planica	Planica	Planica			61
2015/16	–	–	–	–	–	–	–	41	q	–	–	–	–	–	–	–	21	32	15	26	18	30	31	21	–	–	28	28	–			61
2016/17	Kuusamo	Kuusamo	Klingenthal	Lillehammer	Lillehammer	Engelberg	Engelberg	Oberstdorf	Garmisch-Partenkirchen	Innsbruck	Bischofshofen	Wisła	Wisła	Zakopane	Willingen	Oberstdorf	Oberstdorf	Sapporo	Sapporo	Pyeongchang	Pyeongchang	Oslo	Trondheim	Vikersund	Planica	Planica						807
2016/17	7	15	6	7	3	7	5	6	4	29	13	11	22	4	18	8	22	6	9	–	–	3	4	38	3	4						807
2017/18	Wisła	Ruka	Nizhny Tagil	Nizhny Tagil	Titisee-Neustadt	Engelberg	Engelberg	Oberstdorf	Garmisch-Partenkirchen	Innsbruck	Bischofshofen	Bad Mitterndorf	Zakopane	Willingen	Willingen	Lahti	Oslo	Lillehammer	Trondheim	Vikersund	Planica	Planica										597
2017/18	15	5	14	4	20	12	5	9	14	8	10	10	33	12	6	2	22	16	10	7	14	12										597
2018/19	Wisła	Ruka	Ruka	Nizhny Tagil	Nizhny Tagil	Engelberg	Engelberg	Oberstdorf	Garmisch-Partenkirchen	Innsbruck	Bischofshofen	Val di Fiemme	Val di Fiemme	Zakopane	Sapporo	Sapporo	Oberstdorf	Oberstdorf	Oberstdorf	Lahti	Willingen	Willingen	Oslo	Lillehammer	Trondheim	Vikersund	Planica	Planica				937
2018/19	15	15	25	32	10	48	6	2	2	13	5	DQ	6	26	10	16	3	2	10	36	–	2	10	15	9	5	1	3				937
2019/20	Wisła	Kuusamo	Nizhny Tagil	Nizhny Tagil	Klingenthal	Engelberg	Engelberg	Oberstdorf	Garmisch-Partenkirchen	Innsbruck	Bischofshofen	Val di Fiemme	Val di Fiemme	Titisee-Neustadt	Titisee-Neustadt	Zakopane	Sapporo	Sapporo	Willingen	Tauplitz	Tauplitz	Râșnov	Râșnov	Lahti	Lahti	Lillehammer	Lillehammer					304
2019/20	50	23	31	36	15	23	41	11	10	27	14	–	–	–	–	12	26	34	26	28	16	11	14	17	17	2	44					304
2020/21	Wisła	Ruka	Ruka	Nizhny Tagil	Nizhny Tagil	Engelberg	Engelberg	Oberstdorf	Garmisch-Partenkirchen	Innsbruck	Bischofshofen	Titisee-Neustadt	Titisee-Neustadt	Zakopane	Lahti	Willingen	Willingen	Klingenthal	Klingenthal	Zakopane	Zakopane	Râșnov	Planica	Planica	Planica							1190
2020/21	1	1	2	28	4	4	2	5	7	6	35	4	4	8	2	8	3	9	3	14	12	30	2	8	3							1190

=== Podiums ===
Season	Podiums			
Season	Medals			Total
Season	1st place, gold medalist(s)	2nd place, silver medalist(s)	3rd place, bronze medalist(s)	
2011/12	-	-	-	-
2012/13	-	-	-	-
2013/14	-	-	-	-
2014/15	-	-	-	-
2015/16	-	-	-	-
2016/17	-	-	3	3
2017/18	-	1	-	1
2018/19	1	4	2	7
2019/20	-	1	-	1
2020/21	2	4	3	9
Total	3	10	8	21

== Ski jumping national record ==
Date	Hill	Location	Nation	Metres	Feet
25 March 2017	Letalnica bratov Gorišek HS240	Planica, Slovenia	Germany	248	814
