= Maciej Kot =

Polish ski jumper (born 1991)

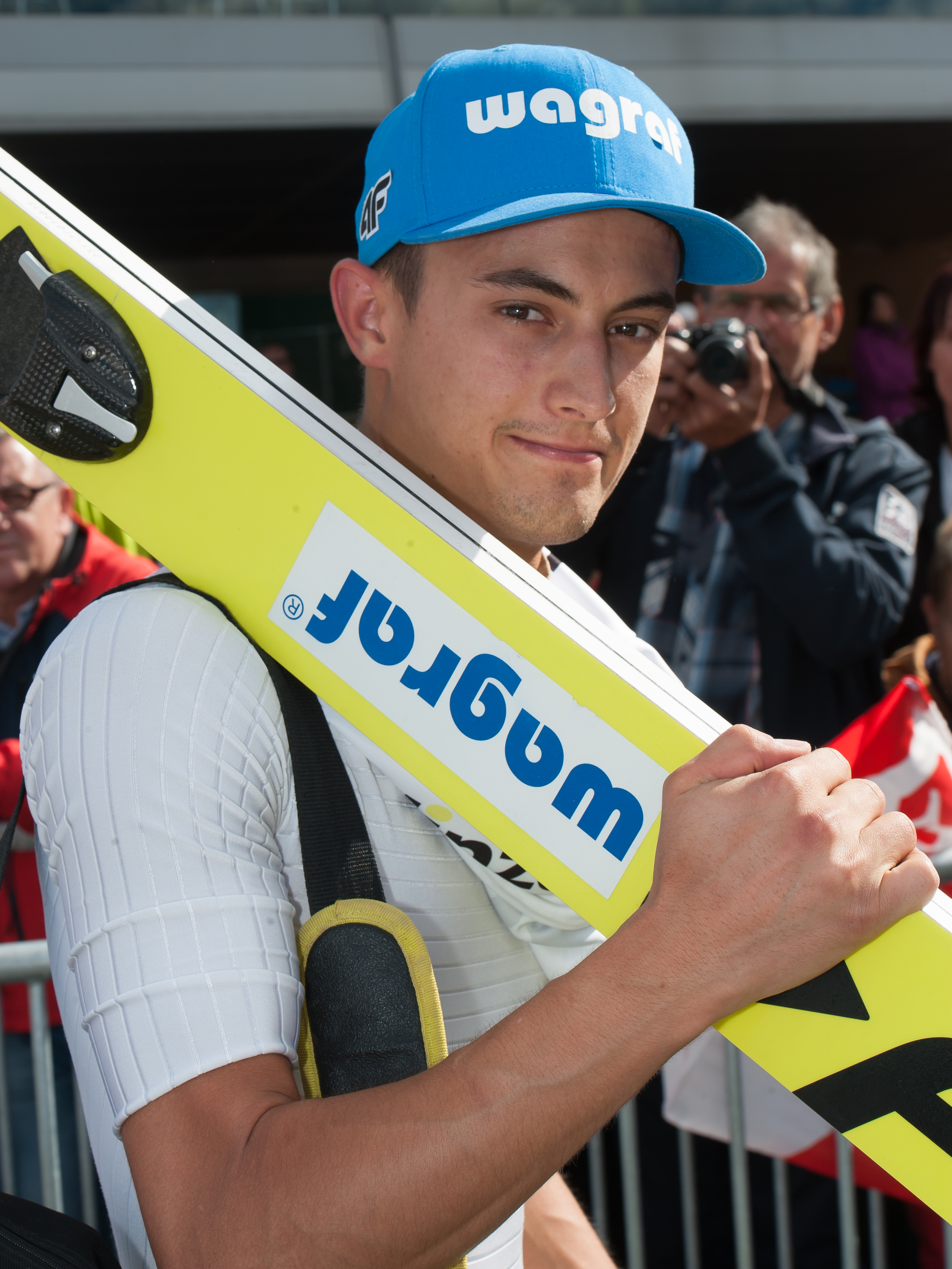
- Maciej Kot (2015)

Personal information
- Full name: Maciej Kot
- Nationality: Poland
- Born: 9 June 1991 (age 35) Limanowa, Poland
- Height: 1.78 m (5 ft 10 in)

Sport
- Sport: Skiing
- Club: AZS Zakopane

World Cup career
- Seasons: 2007–present
- Indiv. starts: 206
- Indiv. podiums: 3
- Indiv. wins: 2
- Team podiums: 17
- Team wins: 3

Achievements and titles
- Personal bests: 244.5 m (802 ft); Vikersund, 18 March 2017
Medal record
Olympic Games
Bronze medal – third place	2018 Pyeongchang	Team LH
World Championships
Gold medal – first place	2017 Lahti	Team LH
Bronze medal – third place	2013 Val di Fiemme	Team LH
- Updated on 12 December 2020

Maciej Kot (Polish pronunciation: [ˈmat͡ɕɛj ˈkɔt]; born 9 June 1991) is a Polish ski jumper. He is a member of the national team and competed at the Winter Olympics in 2014 and 2018. He is the 2017 World Champion and also a bronze medalist in the team large hill event at the 2013 World Championship.

== Personal life ==
Maciej Kot was born in Limanowa, Poland, but was raised in Zakopane. His father Rafał, a ski jumping expert for Polish national television, was formerly a physiotherapist for the Polish ski jumping team. His older brother Jakub also competed in ski jumping. Kot graduated from the University School of Physical Education in Krakow with a master's degree in physical education (MPhEd). On 18 May 2019, he married Agnieszka Lewkowicz, a personal trainer and former athlete, whom he met at university. They have one son, born in 2021. His surname means 'cat' in Polish.

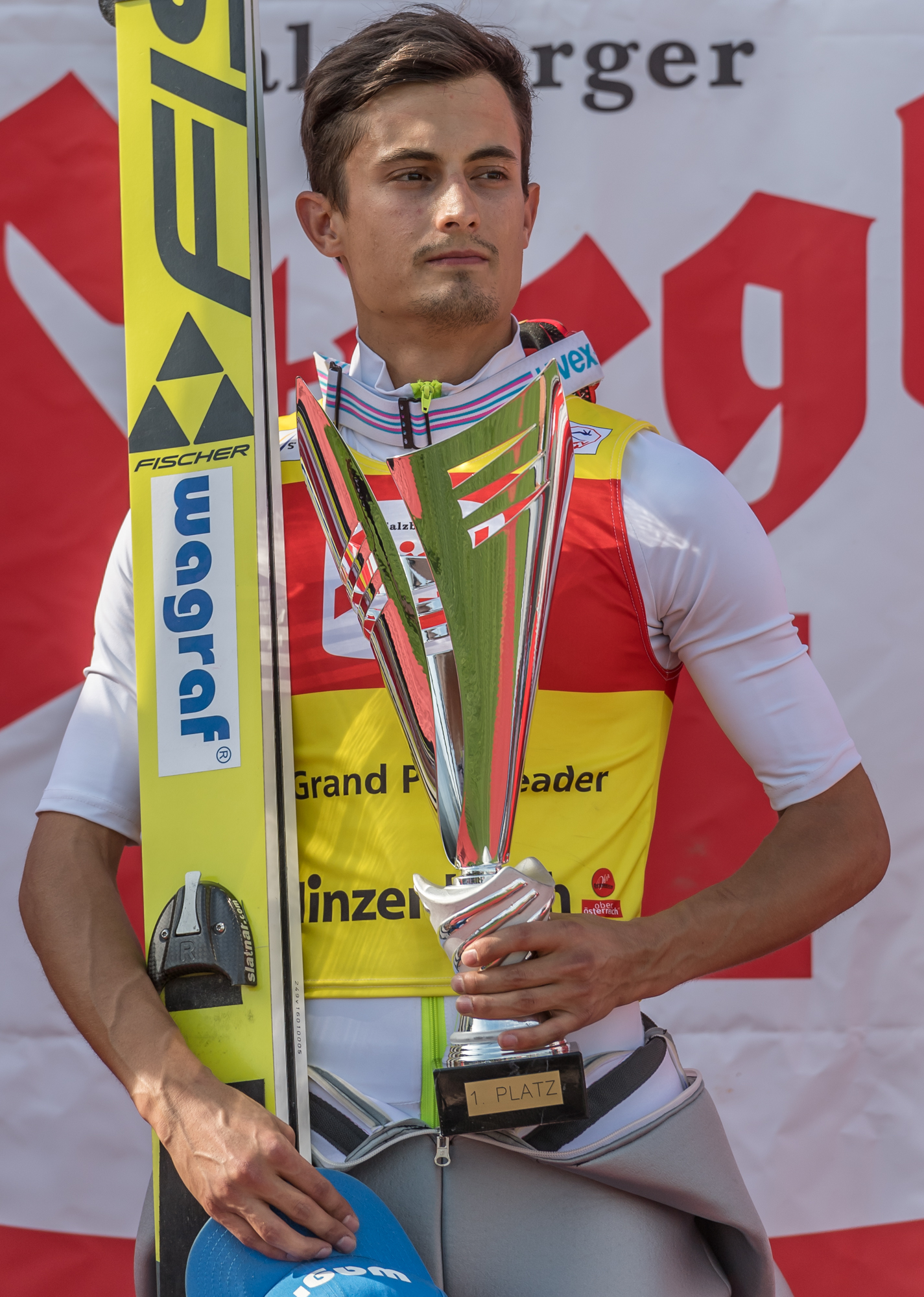
2016 FIS Ski Jumping Grand Prix in Hinzenbach on October 1, 2016.

== Career ==
Kot's debut in the FIS Ski Jumping World Cup took place in December 2007 in Villach. The 2011/2012 World Cup season marked the first time he scored points on the tour. On December 3, 2011 he took 19th place on the hill in Lillehammer. Finally made it twelve times that winter, his best score was 12th place (twice) in Lahti on March 4 and March 11 in Oslo. In the overall World Cup was on 35 position, which was the third best record among the Poles. On March 15, 2012 at Letalnica in Planica set his personal record in the length of the stroke – 200.5 meters.

=== 2012/2013 ===
On July 21, 2012, during the Summer Grand Prix competition in Wisla, Kot stood on the podium for the first time, finishing alongside Simon Ammann and Wolfgang Loitzl. On September 30, 2012 in Hinzenbach, he again was the winner of the Summer Grand Prix, ahead of the second-placed Severin Freund and third-placed Taku Takeuchi. In the 2012 season he placed 5th in the Summer Grand Prix. On January 1, 2013, in the 61st Four Hills Tournament in Garmisch-Partenkirchen, he placed 5th. In two consecutive contests he also placed in the top ten. Finally, he placed 20th in the overall tournament, thanks to a weak performance in the competition in Oberstdorf.

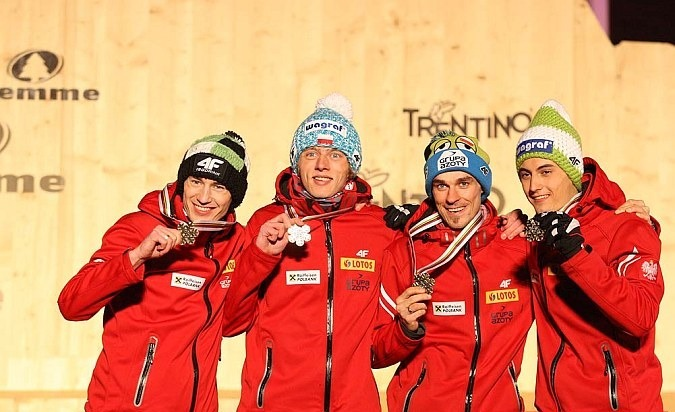
Poland with bronze medals of the 2013 World Championship in team: with Stoch, Kubacki and Żyła.

In individual competitions at FIS Nordic World Ski Championships 2013 took 11th place on the normal hill and 27th on the large hill. On March 2, 2013 he won a bronze medal in the team competition with his teammates: Kamil Stoch, Dawid Kubacki, and Piotr Żyła. The Polish team initially took fourth place, but after re-counting the scores because of Thomas Morgenstern, who noticed a mistake in the points and at the request of the Germans, they finished in third place (The Norwegian team was initially in front of the Polish team, but Anders Bardal's jump was badly counted).

The 2012/2013 season was the best in his career so far. He was in the top 10 on seven occasions. He ended the season in 18th place in the overall World Cup. At the end of the season, he won the title of team and individual Polish champion in ski jumping in Wisła, Poland.

=== 2016/2017 ===
In 2016 FIS Ski Jumping Grand Prix, Kot won 5 of 10 competitions. He held the yellow bib for the entire season and won overall.

On December 3, 2016, the Polish national team, again consisting of Żyła, Stoch, Kubacki and Kot, won their first team competition for Poland in history. In Zakopane, the Polish team, again consisting of Stoch, Kubacki, Kot, and Żyła, achieved second place in the team competition. On January 28, 2017 Poland won their second team competition in history in Willingen. On 11 February 2017, Kot achieved his first career victory in the FIS Ski Jumping World Cup. He won ex aequo with Peter Prevc; both achieved 260.2 points. The next day, he took fourth place.

On March 4, 2017, the Polish national team, again consisting of Żyła, Kubacki, Kot and Stoch, achieved their first title in the team event at the 2017 World Championships. They beat Norway and Austria at Salpausselkä K116 in Lahti, Finland.

=== 2017/2018 ===
On 19 February 2018, Kot and his teammates Stefan Hula, Dawid Kubacki and Kamil Stoch achieved Poland's first medal in the team event at the Olympics. They claimed a bronze behind Norway and Germany.

== Olympic Games ==
Place	Day	Year	Locality	Hill	Point K	HS	Competition	Jump 1	Jump 2	Note (points)	Lost (points)	Winner
7.	February 9	2014	Krasnaya Polyana	RusSki Gorki	K-95	HS-106	individual	101.5 m	98.5 m	255.8	22.2	Kamil Stoch
12.	February 15	2014	Krasnaya Polyana	RusSki Gorki	K-125	HS-140	individual	126.0 m	123.5 m	250.4	28.3	Kamil Stoch
4.	February 17	2014	Krasnaya Polyana	RusSki Gorki	K-125	HS-140	team	131.5 m	129.0 m	1011.8 (251.8)	29.3	Germany
19.	10 February	2018	Pyeongchang	Alpensia	K-98	HS-109	individual	99.0 m	102.0 m	217.0	42.3	Andreas Wellinger
19.	17 February	2018	Pyeongchang	Alpensia	K-125	HS-140	individual	128.5 m	129.5 m	244.6	41.1	Kamil Stoch
3.	19 February	2018	Pyeongchang	Alpensia	K-125	HS-142	team	129.5 m	133.0 m	1072.4 (255.3)	26.1	Norway

== World Championships ==
Place	Day	Year	Locality	Hill	Point K	HS	Competition	Jump 1	Jump 2	Note (points)	Lost (points)	Winner
45.	21 February	2009	Liberec	Ještěd	K-90	HS-100	individual	86 m	—	103.5	175.5	Wolfgang Loitzl
11.	23 February	2013	Predazzo	Trampolino Dal Ben	K-95	HS-106	individual	101.5 m	97 m	234.7	17.9	Anders Bardal
27.	28 February	2013	Predazzo	Trampolino Dal Ben	K-120	HS-134	individual	125.0 m	122.5 m	258.7	37.1	Kamil Stoch
3.	2 March	2013	Predazzo	Trampolino Dal Ben	K-120	HS-134	team	123.0 m	128.5 m	1121.0 (272.3)	14.9	Austria
5.	25 February	2017	Lahti	Salpausselkä	K-90	HS-97	individual	95.0 m	95.5 m	255.1	15.7	Stefan Kraft
6.	2 March	2017	Lahti	Salpausselkä	K-116	HS-130	individual	123.5 m	126.5 m	266.9	12.4	Stefan Kraft
1.	4 March	2017	Lahti	Salpausselkä	K-116	HS-130	team	130,5 m	121,5 m	1104.2 (276.1)	—	—

== Ski Flying World Championships ==
Place	Day	Year	Locality	Hill	Point K	HS	Competition	Jump 1	Jump 2	Jump 3	Jump 4	Note (points)	Loss (points)	Winner
38.	24–25 February	2012	Vikersund	Vikersundbakken	K-195	HS-225	individual	159.5 m	—	—	—	90.1	318.6	Robert Kranjec
7.	26 February	2012	Vikersund	Vikersundbakken	K-195	HS-225	team	174.0 m		178.5 m		1444.5 (300.0)	203.9	Austria
10.	14–15 March	2014	Harrachov	Čerťák	K-185	HS-205	individual	184.5 m	183.5 m	—	—	347.8	43.2	Severin Freund

== World Cup ==
=== Season standings ===
Season	Overall	Ski-Flying	Four Hills Tournament	Raw Air	Willingen Five/ Willingen Six	Planica 7	Titisee-Neustadt Five
2007–08	–	–	54	–	–	–	–
2008–09	–	–	58	–	–	–	–
2009–10	–	–	–	–	–	–	–
2010–11	–	–	–	–	–	–	–
2011–12	35	32	34	–	–	–	–
2012–13	18	16	20	–	–	–	–
2013–14	17	15	12	–	–	–	–
2014–15	65	–	–	–	–	–	–
2015–16	31	32	32	–	–	–	–
2016–17	5	13	4	7	–	–	–
2017–18	21	31	23	32	17	28	–
2018–19	47	–	61	–	36	44	–
2019–20	42	–	31	28	–	–	49
2020–21	58	–	42	– (tournament cancelled)	–	–	– (tournament not held)
2021-22	–	–	–	–	– (tournament not held)	–	–
2022-23	78	–	–	–	–	–	–
2023-24	55	–	43	31	–	51	–
2024-25	52	–	–	41	–	–	–

=== – starts ===
Season	1	2	3	4	5	6	7	8	9	10	11	12	13	14	15	16	17	18	19	20	21	22	23	24	25	26	27	28	29	30	31	Points
2007/08	Kuusamo HS142	Trondheim HS131	Trondheim HS131	Villach HS98	Villach HS98	Engelberg HS137	Engelberg HS137	Oberstdorf HS137	Garmisch-Partenkirchen HS140	Bischofshofen HS140	Bischofshofen HS140	Predazzo HS134	Predazzo HS134	Harrachov HS205	Zakopane HS134	Zakopane HS134	Sapporo HS134	Sapporo HS134	Liberec HS134	Liberec HS134	Willingen HS145	Kuopio HS127	Kuopio HS127	Lillehammer HS138	Oslo HS128	Planica HS215	Planica HS215					0
2007/08	q	q	q	35	52	q	43	38	q	41	q	–	–	–	q	41	–	–	44	31	36	50	48	q	q	–	–					0
2008/09	Kuusamo HS142	Trondheim HS140	Trondheim HS140	Pragelato HS140	Pragelato HS140	Engelberg HS137	Engelberg HS137	Oberstdorf HS137	Garmisch-Partenkirchen HS140	Innsbruck HS130	Bischofshofen HS140	Tauplitz HS200	Tauplitz HS200	Zakopane HS134	Zakopane HS134	Whistler HS140	Whistler HS140	Sapporo HS134	Willingen HS145	Klingenthal HS140	Oberstdorf HS213	Lahti HS97	Kuopio HS127	Lillehammer HS138	Vikersund HS207	Planica HS215	Planica HS215					0
2008/09	–	–	–	–	–	–	–	–	–	–	35	–	–	–	47	–	–	–	–	–	–	–	–	–	–	–	–					0
2009/10	Kuusamo HS142	Lillehammer HS138	Lillehammer HS138	Engelberg HS137	Engelberg HS137	Engelberg HS137	Oberstdorf HS137	Garmisch-Partenkirchen HS140	Innsbruck HS130	Bischofshofen HS140	Bad Mitterndorf HS200	Bad Mitterndorf HS200	Sapporo HS134	Sapporo HS134	Zakopane HS134	Zakopane HS134	Oberstdorf HS213	Klingenthal HS140	Willingen HS145	Lahti HS130	Kuopio HS127	Lillehammer HS138	Oslo HS134									0
2009/10	–	–	–	–	–	–	–	–	–	–	–	–	q	35	q	q	–	–	–	–	–	–	–									0
2010/11	Kuusamo HS142	Kuopio HS127	Lillehammer HS138	Lillehammer HS138	Engelberg HS137	Engelberg HS137	Engelberg HS137	Oberstdorf HS137	Garmisch-Partenkirchen HS140	Innsbruck HS130	Bischofshofen HS140	Harrachov HS205	Harrachov HS205	Sapporo HS134	Sapporo HS134	Zakopane HS134	Zakopane HS134	Zakopane HS134	Willingen HS145	Klingenthal HS140	Oberstdorf HS213	Vikersund HS225	Vikersund HS225	Lahti HS130	Planica HS215	Planica HS215						0
2010/11	–	–	–	–	–	–	–	–	–	–	–	–	–	40	45	46	q	–	–	–	–	q	q	–	q	–						0
2011/12	Kuusamo HS142	Lillehammer HS100	Lillehammer HS138	Harrachov HS142	Harrachov HS142	Engelberg HS137	Engelberg HS137	Oberstdorf HS137	Garmisch-Partenkirchen HS140	Innsbruck HS130	Bischofshofen HS140	Bad Mitterndorf HS200	Bad Mitterndorf HS200	Zakopane HS134	Zakopane HS134	Sapporo HS134	Sapporo HS134	Predazzo HS134	Predazzo HS134	Willingen HS145	Oberstdorf HS213	Lahti HS97	Trondheim HS140	Oslo HS134	Planica HS215	Planica HS215						108
2011/12	q	19	q	45	q	46	29	40	37	30	28	34	27	25	18	38	28	26	47	28	q	12	40	12	17	–						108
2012/13	Lillehammer HS100	Lillehammer HS138	Kuusamo HS142	Krasnaja Polana HS106	Krasnaja Polana HS106	Engelberg HS137	Engelberg HS137	Oberstdorf HS137	Garmisch-Partenkirchen HS140	Innsbruck HS130	Bischofshofen HS140	Wisła HS134	Zakopane HS134	Sapporo HS134	Sapporo HS134	Vikersund HS225	Vikersund HS225	Harrachov HS205	Harrachov HS205	Klingenthal HS140	Oberstdorf HS213	Lahti HS130	Kuopio HS127	Trondheim HS140	Oslo HS134	Planica HS215	Planica HS215					460
2012/13	25	48	32	28	22	17	13	50	5	9	10	13	5	10	14	16	14	16	16	13	–	6	17	24	11	8	18					460
2013/14	Klingenthal HS140	Kuusamo HS142	Lillehammer HS100	Lillehammer HS138	Titisee-Neustadt HS142	Titisee-Neustadt HS142	Engelberg HS137	Engelberg HS137	Oberstdorf HS137	Garmisch-Partenkirchen HS140	Innsbruck HS130	Bischofshofen HS140	Tauplitz HS200	Tauplitz HS200	Wisła HS134	Zakopane HS134	Sapporo HS134	Sapporo HS134	Willingen HS145	Willingen HS145	Falun HS134	Lahti HS130	Lahti HS130	Kuopio HS127	Trondheim HS140	Oslo HS134	Planica HS139	Planica HS139				398
2013/14	6	21	5	27	13	10	21	19	28	20	27	23	19	10	23	10	–	–	20	16	10	q	q	15	25	20	8	15				398
2014/15	Klingenthal HS140	Kuusamo HS142	Kuusamo HS142	Lillehammer HS138	Lillehammer HS138	Nizhny Tagil HS134	Nizhny Tagil HS134	Engelberg HS137	Engelberg HS137	Oberstdorf HS137	Garmisch-Partenkirchen HS140	Innsbruck HS130	Bischofshofen HS140	Tauplitz HS225	Wisła HS134	Zakopane HS134	Sapporo HS134	Sapporo HS134	Willingen HS145	Willingen HS145	Titisee-Neustadt HS142	Titisee-Neustadt HS142	Vikersund HS225	Vikersund HS225	Lahti HS130	Kuopio HS100	Trondheim HS140	Oslo HS134	Oslo HS134	Planica HS225	Planica HS225	17
2014/15	29	q	41	–	–	26	35	–	–	–	–	–	–	–	45	30	29	24	–	46	–	–	–	–	–	–	–	–	–	–	–	17
2015/16	Klingenthal HS140	Lillehammer HS100	Lillehammer HS100	Nizhny Tagil HS134	Nizhny Tagil HS134	Engelberg HS137	Engelberg HS137	Oberstdorf HS137	Garmisch-Partenkirchen HS140	Innsbruck HS130	Bischofshofen HS140	Willingen HS145	Zakopane HS134	Sapporo HS134	Sapporo HS134	Trondheim HS140	Vikersund HS225	Vikersund HS225	Vikersund HS225	Lahti HS130	Lahti HS100	Kuopio HS127	Almaty HS140	Almaty HS140	Wisła HS134	Titisee-Neustadt HS142	Planica HS225	Planica HS225	Planica HS225			165
2015/16	46	18	34	15	18	q	30	32	36	35	28	26	12	12	13	41	30	30	39	–	–	–	q	32	19	25	31	17	15			165
2016/17	Kuusamo HS142	Kuusamo HS142	Klingenthal HS140	Lillehammer HS138	Lillehammer HS138	Engelberg HS140	Engelberg HS140	Oberstdorf HS137	Garmisch-Partenkirchen HS140	Innsbruck HS130	Bischofshofen HS140	Wisła HS134	Wisła HS134	Zakopane HS134	Willingen HS145	Oberstdorf HS225	Oberstdorf HS225	Sapporo HS137	Sapporo HS137	Pyeongchang HS140	Pyeongchang HS109	Oslo HS134	Trondheim HS140	Vikersund HS225	Planica HS225	Planica HS225						985
2016/17	5	8	5	5	2	12	15	12	7	6	5	9	5	12	13	18	6	1	4	7	1	11	13	14	12	14						985
2017/18	Wisła HS134	Kuusamo HS142	Nizhny Tagil HS134	Nizhny Tagil HS134	Titisee-Neustadt HS142	Engelberg HS140	Engelberg HS140	Oberstdorf HS137	Garmisch-Partenkirchen HS140	Innsbruck HS130	Bischofshofen HS140	Tauplitz HS235	Zakopane HS140	Willingen HS145	Willingen HS145	Lahti HS130	Oslo HS134	Lillehammer HS140	Trondheim HS140	Vikersund HS240	Planica HS240	Planica HS240										261
2017/18	19	16	20	8	32	17	16	15	18	13	41	23	14	21	8	14	q	31	16	31	31	19										261
2018/19	Wisła HS134	Kuusamo HS142	Kuusamo HS142	Nizhny Tagil HS134	Nizhny Tagil HS134	Engelberg HS140	Engelberg HS140	Oberstdorf HS137	Garmisch-Partenkirchen HS142	Innsbruck HS130	Bischofshofen HS142	Predazzo HS135	Predazzo HS135	Zakopane HS140	Sapporo HS137	Sapporo HS137	Oberstdorf HS235	Oberstdorf HS235	Oberstdorf HS235	Lahti HS130	Willingen HS145	Willingen HS145	Oslo HS134	Lillehammer HS140	Trondheim HS138	Vikersund HS240	Planica HS240	Planica HS240				25
2018/19	29	53	q	36	41	26	42	q	q	q	40	34	25	30	50	21	–	–	–	33	37	30	–	–	–	–	35	–				25
2019/20	Wisła HS134	Kuusamo HS142	Nizhny Tagil HS134	Nizhny Tagil HS134	Klingenthal HS140	Engelberg HS140	Engelberg HS140	Oberstdorf HS137	Garmisch-Partenkirchen HS142	Innsbruck HS130	Bischofshofen HS142	Predazzo HS104	Predazzo HS104	Titisee-Neustadt HS142	Titisee-Neustadt HS142	Zakopane HS140	Sapporo HS137	Sapporo HS137	Willingen HS145	Tauplitz HS235	Tauplitz HS235	Râșnov HS97	Râșnov HS97	Lahti HS130	Lahti HS130	Lillehammer HS140	Lillehammer HS140					40
2019/20	25	18	27	24	32	34	35	28	33	44	33	27	36	46	49	44	—	—	—	—	—	—	—	—	—	39	28					40
2020/21	Wisła HS134	Kuusamo HS142	Kuusamo HS142	Nizhny Tagil HS134	Nizhny Tagil HS134	Engelberg HS140	Engelberg HS140	Oberstdorf HS137	Garmisch-Partenkirchen HS142	Innsbruck HS130	Bischofshofen HS142	Titisee-Neustadt HS142	Titisee-Neustadt HS142	Zakopane HS140	Lahti HS130	Willingen HS145	Willingen HS145	TBD	TBD	TBD	TBD	Râșnov HS97	Oslo HS134	Lillehammer HS140	Trondheim HS138	Vikersund HS240	Planica HS240	Planica HS240				17
2020/21	20	–	–	25	31																											17

=== Victories ===
	Day	Year	Location	Hill	Point K	HS	Jump 1	Jump 2	Note (points)
1.	11 February	2017	Sapporo	Ōkurayama	K-120	HS-134	139.0 m	138.0 m	260.2
2.	16 February	2017	Pyeongchang	Alpensia	K-98	HS-109	108.5 m	110.5 m	256.2

=== Podiums ===
	Day	Year	Location	Hill	Point K	HS	Jump 1	Jump 2	Note (points)	Place	Lost (points)	Winner
1.	11 December	2016	Lillehammer	Lysgårdsbakken	K-123	HS-138	129.5 m	136.0 m	289.3	2.	0.6	Kamil Stoch
2.	11 February	2017	Sapporo	Ōkurayama	K-120	HS-134	139.0 m	138.0 m	260.2	1.	–	–
3.	16 February	2017	Pyeongchang	Alpensia	K-98	HS-109	108.5 m	110.5 m	256.2	1.	–	–

=== Team victories ===
	Day	Year	Location	Hill	Point K	HS	Jump 1	Jump 2	Note (points)
1.	3 December	2016	Klingenthal	Vogtlandarena	K-125	HS-140	139.0 m	139.0 m	1128.7 pkt (296.9)
2.	28 January	2017	Willingen	Mühlenkopfschanze	K-130	HS-145	137.5 m	133.5 m	931.5 pkt (229.4)
3.	27 January	2018	Zakopane	Wielka Krokiew	K-125	HS-140	133.0 m	130.0 m	1092.0 pkt (260.1)
