= Gabriel Karlen =

Swiss ski jumper

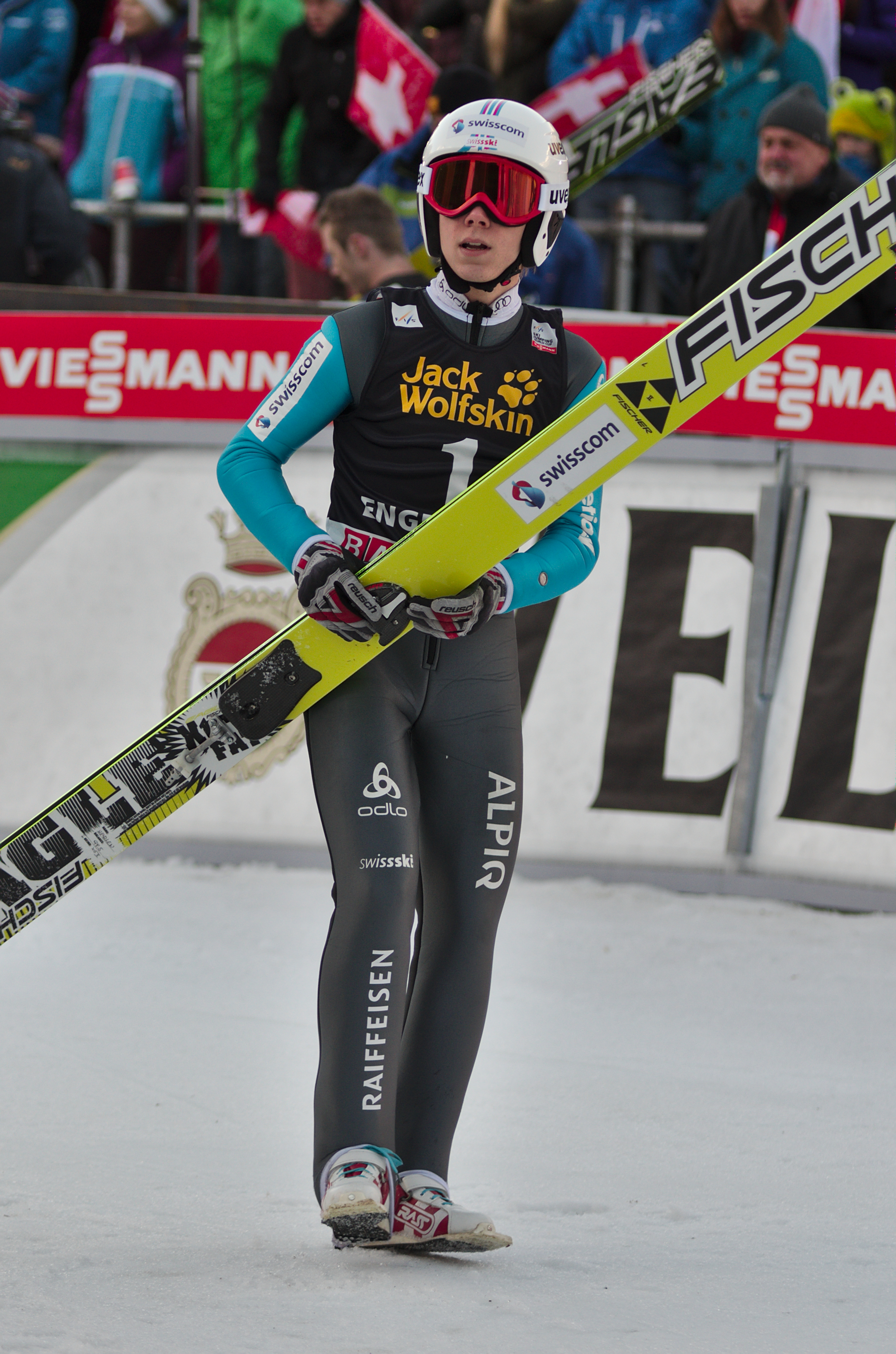

Personal information
- Full name: Gabriel Karlen
- Born: 10 March 1994 (age 32)

Sport
- Sport: Skiing
- Club: Gstaad

World Cup career
- Seasons: -
Medal record
Men's ski jumping
Representing Switzerland

Gabriel Karlen (born 10 March 1994) is a Swiss ski jumper.

He competed in the 2015 World Cup season.

He represented Switzerland at the FIS Nordic World Ski Championships 2015 in Falun.
