= 2017–18 FIS Ski Flying World Cup =

FIS Ski Flying World Cup 2017/18
Winners
- Overall: (Norway) Andreas Stjernen

Competitions
- Venues: 3
- Individual: 4
- Team: 2
- Cancelled: 1

The 2017–18 FIS Ski Flying World Cup was the 21st official World Cup season in ski flying. The winner was awarded with small crystal globe as the subdiscipline of FIS Ski Jumping World Cup.

== Map of World Cup hosts ==
(Austria) Bad Mitterndorf	(Norway) Vikersund	(Slovenia) Planica
Kulm	Vikersundbakken	Letalnica bratov Gorišek
Europe

== Invalid world record ==
Invalid world record distance achieved within this World Cup season.

Date	Athlete	Hill	Round	Place	Metres	Feet
22 March 2018	(Austria) Gregor Schlierenzauer	Letalnica bratov Gorišek HS240	Qualifications	Planica, Slovenia	253.5	832

2nd longest jump in history at that time (tied with official WR distance), but invalid due to Schlierenzauer (touch) upon landing.

== Calendar ==
=== Men's Individual ===
All	No.	Date	Place (Hill)	Size	Winner	Second	Third	Ski flying leader	R.
937	1	13 January 2018	(Austria) Bad Mitterndorf (Kulm HS235)	F _{116}	(Norway) Andreas Stjernen	(Norway) Daniel-André Tande	(Switzerland) Simon Ammann	(Norway) Andreas Stjernen	
		14 January 2018	(Austria) Bad Mitterndorf (Kulm HS235)	F _{cnx}	cancelled due to strong wind			—	
FIS Ski Flying World Championships 2018 (19 – 20 January • (Germany) Oberstdorf)
prologue		16 March 2018	(Norway) Vikersund (Vikersundbakken HS240)	F _{Qro}	(Poland) Kamil Stoch	(Norway) Robert Johansson	(Norway) Andreas Stjernen	—	
team		17 March 2018	(Norway) Vikersund (Vikersundbakken HS240)	F _{T}	(Austria) Stefan Kraft	(Norway) Robert Johansson	(Norway) Daniel-André Tande	—	
945	2	18 March 2018	(Norway) Vikersund (Vikersundbakken HS240)	F _{117}	(Norway) Robert Johansson	(Norway) Andreas Stjernen	(Norway) Daniel-André Tande	(Norway) Andreas Stjernen	
qualifying		22 March 2018	(Slovenia) Planica (Letalnica b. Gorišek HS240)	F _{Qro}	(Norway) Johann André Forfang	(Slovenia) Anže Semenič	(Poland) Dawid Kubacki	—	
946	3	23 March 2018	(Slovenia) Planica (Letalnica b. Gorišek HS240)	F _{118}	(Poland) Kamil Stoch	(Norway) Johann André Forfang	(Austria) Stefan Kraft	(Norway) Andreas Stjernen	
team		24 March 2018	(Slovenia) Planica (Letalnica b. Gorišek HS240)	F _{T}	(Norway) Daniel-André Tande	(Norway) Robert Johansson	(Slovenia) Domen Prevc	—	
947	4	25 March 2018	(Slovenia) Planica (Letalnica b. Gorišek HS240)	F _{119}	(Poland) Kamil Stoch	(Austria) Stefan Kraft	(Norway) Daniel-André Tande	(Norway) Andreas Stjernen	
1st Planica7 Overall (22 – 25 March 2018)					(Poland) Kamil Stoch	(Norway) Johann André Forfang	(Norway) Robert Johansson	Planica7	
21st FIS Ski Flying Men's Overall (13 January – 25 March 2018)					(Norway) Andreas Stjernen	(Poland) Kamil Stoch	(Norway) Robert Johansson	Ski Flying Overall	

=== Men's team ===
All	No.	Date	Place (Hill)	Size	Winner	Second	Third	R.
94	1	17 March 2018	(Norway) Vikersund (Vikersundbakken HS240)	F _{020}	Norway Daniel-André Tande; Johann André Forfang; Andreas Stjernen; Robert Johansson	Poland Piotr Żyła; Stefan Hula Jr. Dawid Kubacki; Kamil Stoch	Slovenia Domen Prevc; Jernej Damjan; Tilen Bartol; Peter Prevc	
95	2	24 March 2018	(Slovenia) Planica (Letalnica bratov Gorišek HS240)	F _{021}	Norway Daniel-André Tande; Andreas Stjernen; Robert Johansson; Johann André Forfang	Germany Markus Eisenbichler; Stephan Leyhe; Andreas Wellinger; Richard Freitag	Slovenia Domen Prevc; Robert Kranjec; Anže Semenič; Peter Prevc	

Raw Air 2018 (part of)
Planica7 (2018) (part of)

== Standings ==
=== Ski Flying ===
Rank	after 4 events	13/01/2018 Kulm	18/03/2018 Vikersund	23/03/2018 Planica	25/03/2018 Planica	Total
	(Norway) Andreas Stjernen	100	80	32	45	257
2	(Poland) Kamil Stoch	10	40	100	100	250
	(Norway) Robert Johansson	50	100	50	50	250
4	(Austria) Stefan Kraft	29	45	60	80	214
5	(Norway) Daniel-André Tande	80	60	q	60	200
6	(Norway) Johann André Forfang	1	29	80	32	140
7	(Germany) Richard Freitag	DNS	32	40	40	112
8	(Slovenia) Peter Prevc	40	18	16	32	106
9	(Japan) Noriaki Kasai	45	26	24	9	104
10	(Germany) Markus Eisenbichler	26	36	18	22	102
11	(Switzerland) Simon Ammann	60	10	12	18	100
12	(Norway) Anders Fannemel	15	13	45	24	97
13	(Slovenia) Domen Prevc	24	50	q	DNS	74
14	(Japan) Junshirō Kobayashi	0	8	36	26	70
15	(Poland) Stefan Hula	18	14	10	20	62
16	(Poland) Dawid Kubacki	0	15	29	10	54
17	(Japan) Ryōyū Kobayashi	3	9	20	16	48
18	(Slovenia) Anže Semenič	32	q	1	14	47
19	(Slovenia) Tilen Bartol	13	20	q	13	46
20	(Norway) Halvor Egner Granerud	6	24	3	11	44
21	(Austria) Clemens Aigner	36	q	q	5	41
22	(Poland) Piotr Żyła	14	22	q	4	40
23	(Germany) Stephan Leyhe	11	16	11	1	39
24	(Germany) Karl Geiger	q	0	q	36	36
25	(Austria) Michael Hayböck	22	6	DNS	7	35
26	(Germany) Andreas Wellinger	16	0	q	15	31
27	(Slovenia) Robert Kranjec	DNS	DNS	26	DNS	26
28	(United States) Kevin Bickner	7	1	15	DNS	23
29	(Slovenia) Jurij Tepeš	DNS	DNS	22	DNS	22
30	(Russia) Denis Kornilov	q	12	9	DNS	21
31	(Czech Republic) Čestmír Kožíšek	20	q	0	DNS	20
	(Poland) Maciej Kot	8	0	0	12	20
33	(Slovenia) Jernej Damjan	2	7	0	8	17
34	(Slovenia) Tomaž Naglič	DNS	DNS	14	DNS	14
35	(Slovenia) Bor Pavlovčič	DNS	DNS	13	DNS	13
36	(Austria) Manuel Poppinger	12	DNS	DNS	DNS	12
	(Austria) Daniel Huber	q	DNS	6	6	12
	(Germany) Pius Paschke	4	DNS	5	3	12
39	(Japan) Yukiya Sato	DNS	11	0	DNS	11
	(Japan) Taku Takeuchi	9	q	0	2	11
41	(Germany) Andreas Wank	0	q	8	DNS	8
42	(Slovenia) Žiga Jelar	0	DNS	7	DNS	7
43	(Poland) Jakub Wolny	0	4	2	DNS	6
44	(Italy) Alex Insam	0	5	0	DNS	5
	(Bulgaria) Vladimir Zografski	5*	0	q	DNS	5
46	(Austria) Gregor Schlierenzauer	0	0	4	DNS	4
47	(Slovenia) Nejc Dežman	DNS	3	q	DNS	3
48	(Austria) Manuel Fettner	0	2	0	0	2
	(Russia) Mikhail Nazarov	0	q	q	DNS	0
	(Italy) Sebastian Colloredo	0	q	q	DNS	0
	(Finland) Janne Ahonen	0	DNS	DNS	DNS	0
	(Russia) Dimitry Vassiliev	DNS*	DNS	DNS	DNS	0
	(Austria) Andreas Schuler	q	q	q	DNS	0
	(France) Vincent Descombes Sevoie	q	DNS	DNS	DNS	0
	(Estonia) Martti Nomme	q	q	q	DNS	0
	(Austria) Florian Altenburger	q	DNS	DNS	DNS	0
	(Switzerland) Gregor Deschwanden	q	q	q	DNS	0
	(Czech Republic) Lukáš Hlava	q	DNS	DNS	DNS	0
	(United States) Michael Glasder	q	q	q	DNS	0
	(Canada) MacKenzie Boyd-Clowes	q	DNS	q	DNS	0
	(United States) William Rhoads	q	DNS	q	DNS	0
	(Russia) Alexey Romashov	q	q	q	DNS	0
	(Norway) Joachim Hauer	q	DNS	DNS	DNS	0
	(Switzerland) Killian Peier	q	DNS	DNS	DNS	0
	(Kazakhstan) Marat Zhaparov	q	q	q	DNS	0
	(Czech Republic) Filip Sakala	DNS	DNS	DNS	DNS	0
	(Kazakhstan) Sabirzhan Muminov	DNS	DNS	DNS	DNS	0
	(Germany) David Siegel	DNS	q	DNS	DNS	0
	(Italy) Davide Bresadola	DNS	q	0	DNS	0
	(Norway) Marius Lindvik	DNS	0	0	DNS	0
	(Kazakhstan) Konstantin Sokolenko	DNS	DNS	q	DNS	0
	(Italy) Roberto Dellasega	DNS	DNS	q	DNS	0
	(Estonia) Artti Aigro	DNS	DNS	q	DNS	0
	(Italy) Federico Cecon	DNS	DNS	q	DNS	0
	(Switzerland) Luca Egloff	DNS	DNS	q	DNS	0
	(United States) Casey Larson	DNS	DNS	q	DNS	0
	(Finland) Andreas Allamomo	DNS	DNS	q	DNS	0
	(Austria) Philipp Aschenwald	DNS	DNS	q	DNS	0
