= 2017–18 Four Hills Tournament =

Ski jumping competition

Four Hills Tournament at the 2017–18 FIS Ski Jumping World Cup
- Venue: Schattenbergschanze, Große Olympiaschanze, Bergiselschanze, Paul-Ausserleitner-Schanze
- Location: Austria, Germany
- Dates: 30 December 2017 – 6 January 2018

Medalists
gold medal	(Poland) Kamil Stoch
silver medal	(Germany) Andreas Wellinger
bronze medal	(Norway) Anders Fannemel

The 2017–18 Four Hills Tournament took place at the four traditional venues of Oberstdorf, Garmisch-Partenkirchen, Innsbruck, and Bischofshofen, located in Germany and Austria, between 30 December 2017 and 6 January 2018.

Kamil Stoch successfully defended his title, becoming the first ski jumper since Gregor Schlierenzauer in 2012–13 to do so. By winning all four events, Stoch became the second ski jumper in history to achieve this feat, Sven Hannawald being the first in 2001–02.

== Results ==
=== Oberstdorf ===
HS 137 Schattenbergschanze, Germany
30 December 2017

Rank	Name	Nationality	Jump 1 (m)	Jump 2 (m)	Points
1	Kamil Stoch	Poland	126.0	137.0	279.7
2	Richard Freitag	Germany	128.5	127.0	275.5
3	Dawid Kubacki	Poland	126.5	129.0	270.1
4	Stefan Kraft	Austria	132.0	119.0	262.8
5	Stefan Hula	Poland	123.0	120.5	259.2
6	Junshirō Kobayashi	Japan	126.5	123.0	257.1
7	Anders Fannemel	Norway	129.0	124.5	255.3
7	Johann André Forfang	Norway	114.5	126.5	255.3
9	Markus Eisenbichler	Germany	128.5	117.5	255.1
10	Andreas Wellinger	Germany	115.0	123.0	254.0

=== Garmisch-Partenkirchen ===
HS 140 Große Olympiaschanze, Germany
1 January 2018

Rank	Name	Nationality	Jump 1 (m)	Jump 2 (m)	Points
1	Kamil Stoch	Poland	135.5	139.5	283.4
2	Richard Freitag	Germany	132.0	137.0	275.8
3	Anders Fannemel	Norway	132.5	136.5	270.2
4	Junshirō Kobayashi	Japan	137.0	131.5	269.2
5	Tilen Bartol	Slovenia	136.0	133.5	268.9
6	Andreas Stjernen	Norway	132.0	137.5	268.7
7	Karl Geiger	Germany	136.0	133.5	268.2
8	Peter Prevc	Slovenia	129.0	138.0	266.9
9	Johann André Forfang	Norway	124.0	138.5	263.4
10	Stephan Leyhe	Germany	130.5	137.5	263.3

=== Innsbruck ===
HS 130 Bergiselschanze, Austria
4 January 2018

Rank	Name	Nationality	Jump 1 (m)	Jump 2 (m)	Points
1	Kamil Stoch	Poland	130.0	128.5	270.1
2	Daniel-André Tande	Norway	129.5	125.0	255.6
3	Andreas Wellinger	Germany	133.0	126.0	253.5
4	Andreas Stjernen	Norway	125.0	127.0	241.1
5	Jernej Damjan	Slovenia	127.0	120.0	239.9
6	Junshirō Kobayashi	Japan	123.0	121.5	239.4
7	Robert Johansson	Norway	124.5	123.0	237.3
8	Markus Eisenbichler	Germany	128.5	117.0	236.1
9	Stephan Leyhe	Germany	123.5	119.0	235.1
10	Michael Hayböck	Austria	123.5	122.5	234.7

=== Bischofshofen ===
HS 140 Paul-Ausserleitner-Schanze, Austria
6 January 2018

Rank	Name	Nationality	Jump 1 (m)	Jump 2 (m)	Points
1	Kamil Stoch	Poland	132.5	137.0	275.6
2	Anders Fannemel	Norway	130.0	139.0	272.4
3	Andreas Wellinger	Germany	129.0	139.5	270.5
4	Stefan Kraft	Austria	130.5	135.5	268.6
5	Robert Johansson	Norway	127.0	140.0	268.2
6	Andreas Stjernen	Norway	129.5	138.5	267.2
7	Junshirō Kobayashi	Japan	126.5	134.5	255.4
8	Peter Prevc	Slovenia	127.5	131.5	253.8
9	Dawid Kubacki	Poland	132.0	127.5	253.3
10	Markus Eisenbichler	Germany	126.5	129.0	244.5

== Overall standings ==
The final standings after all four events:

Rank	Name	Nationality	Oberstdorf	Garmisch- Partenkirchen	Innsbruck	Bischofshofen	Total Points
1st place, gold medalist(s)	Kamil Stoch	Poland	279.7 (1)	283.4 (1)	270.1 (1)	275.6 (1)	1,108.8
2nd place, silver medalist(s)	Andreas Wellinger	Germany	254.0 (10)	261.2 (11)	253.5 (3)	270.5 (3)	1,039.2
3rd place, bronze medalist(s)	Anders Fannemel	Norway	255.3 (7)	270.2 (3)	223.4 (16)	272.4 (2)	1,021.3
4	Junshirō Kobayashi	Japan	257.1 (6)	269.2 (4)	239.4 (6)	255.4 (7)	1,021.1
5	Robert Johansson	Norway	253.4 (11)	250.5 (17)	237.3 (7)	268.2 (5)	1,009.4
6	Dawid Kubacki	Poland	270.1 (3)	260.7 (12)	218.9 (20)	253.3 (9)	1,003.0
7	Markus Eisenbichler	Germany	255.1 (9)	258.1 (14)	236.1 (8)	244.5 (10)	993.8
8	Daniel-André Tande	Norway	237.7 (20)	256.4 (15)	255.6 (2)	242.6 (12)	992.3
9	Johann André Forfang	Norway	255.3 (7)	263.4 (9)	219.3 (19)	239.4 (13)	977.4
10	Jernej Damjan	Slovenia	245.0 (14)	259.3 (13)	239.9 (5)	229.9 (17)	974.1
