= Planica7 (2018) =

Winners
- Overall: (Poland) Kamil Stoch

Competitions
- Venues: 1
- Individual: 2
- Team: 1

The Planica7 (2018) was the first edition of Planica7, a four-day tournament for men in ski flying, held between 22 and 25 March 2018 in Planica, Slovenia. It was part of the 2017/18 World Cup season final.

== Competition ==
=== Format ===
The competition was held at Letalnica bratov Gorišek, Slovenia. It lasated for four consecutive days with a total of 7 rounds from individual events, team event and qualification round.

	Events	Rounds
Individual	2	4 (2x2)
Qualification round	1	1 (1x1)
Team	1	2 (1x2)
Total	4	7

== Host ==
=== Map ===
Planica7 (2018) (Slovenia)

== Results ==
=== Individual ===
Num	Season	Date	Place	Hill	Size	Winner	Second	Third	Event	Rounds	Planica 7 bib	Ref.
1	1	22 March 2018	(Slovenia) Planica	Letalnica bratov Gorišek HS240	FH	(Norway) Johann André Forfang	(Slovenia) Anže Semenič	(Poland) Dawid Kubacki	qualifying	1R	(Norway) Johann André Forfang	
2	2	23 March 2018	(Slovenia) Planica	Letalnica bratov Gorišek HS240	FH	(Poland) Kamil Stoch	(Norway) Johann André Forfang	(Austria) Stefan Kraft	individual	2R	(Norway) Johann André Forfang	
3	3	24 March 2018	(Slovenia) Planica	Letalnica bratov Gorišek HS240	FH	(Norway) Daniel-André Tande	(Norway) Robert Johansson	(Slovenia) Domen Prevc	team	2R	(Norway) Johann André Forfang	
4	4	25 March 2018	(Slovenia) Planica	Letalnica bratov Gorišek HS240	FH	(Poland) Kamil Stoch	(Austria) Stefan Kraft	(Norway) Daniel-André Tande	individual	2R	(Poland) Kamil Stoch	
1st Planica7 Overall (after 4 events)						(Poland) Kamil Stoch	(Norway) Johann André Forfang	(Norway) Robert Johansson		7R		

=== Team ===
Num	Season	Date	Place	Hill	Size	Winner	Second	Third	Note	Ref.
1	1	24 March 2018	(Slovenia) Planica	Letalnica bratov Gorišek HS240	FH	Norway Daniel-André Tande; Andreas Stjernen; Robert Johansson; Johann André Forfang	Germany Markus Eisenbichler; Stephan Leyhe; Andreas Wellinger; Richard Freitag	Slovenia Domen Prevc; Robert Kranjec; Anže Semenič; Peter Prevc	both rounds count individual in Planica 7 overall	

== Standings ==
=== Planica7 ===
Rank	After 4 events	22/03/2018		23/03/2018			24/03/2018			25/03/2018			Total points (7)
Rank	After 4 events	Qualifying (1R)		Individual (2R)			Team (2R)			Individual (2R)			Total points (7)
Rank	After 4 events	Rank	Points (R1)	Rank	Points (R2)	Points (R3)	Rank	Points (R4)	Points (R5)	Rank	Points (R6)	Points (R7)	Total points (7)
1st place, gold medalist(s)	(Poland) Kamil Stoch	8	216.1	1	228.9	227.0	4	211.6	199.0	1	237.9	217.7	1538.2
2nd place, silver medalist(s)	(Norway) Johann André Forfang	1	243.4	2	223.5	228.7	5	208.0	201.1	8	217.7	206.4	1528.8
3rd place, bronze medalist(s)	(Norway) Robert Johansson	9	215.1	4	224.0	214.8	2	213.7	206.7	4	222.7	215.5	1512.5
4	(Austria) Stefan Kraft	22	203.3	3	222.5	220.5	8	193.6	197.8	2	222.1	218.0	1477.8
5	(Germany) Richard Freitag	5	221.0	6	211.4	219.8	7	198.7	192.9	6	208.5	219.4	1471.1
6	(Germany) Markus Eisenbichler	12	213.8	14	198.4	208.5	6	203.1	199.0	12	208.2	200.8	1431.8
7	(Japan) Junshiro Kobayashi	11	214.0	7	217.5	208.7	14	186.4	179.0	10	217.8	205.4	1428.8
8	(Norway) Andreas Stjernen	26	199.1	8	209.6	212.9	15	183.4	180.0	5	210.3	219.1	1414.4
9	(Japan) Ryōyū Kobayashi	4	225.3	13	208.0	201.7	11	186.2	188.3	15	194.2	210.2	1413.9
10	(Poland) Stefan Hula	7	217.4	21	189.1	200.9	13	185.7	183.3	13	206.2	199.4	1382.0
11	(Slovenia) Peter Prevc	25	200.0	15	212.7	191.3	18	175.7	174.0	8	210.9	213.2	1377.8
12	(Switzerland) Simon Ammann	23	201.9	19	193.0	204.3	12	188.7	182.8	14	206.3	199.0	1376.0
13	(Japan) Noriaki Kasai	30	197.0	11	215.8	195.5	9	197.6	192.0	22	189.2	186.9	1374.0
14	(Poland) Dawid Kubacki	3	227.7	9	212.5	204.3	17	191.3	160.7	21	189.7	186.6	1372.8
15	(Germany) Stephan Leyhe	6	220.2	20	194.1	203.1	25	169.8	159.8	30	172.0	158.1	1277.1
16	(Austria) Daniel Huber	26	199.1	25	192.1	191.0	24	174.8	159.0	25	171.5	184.1	1271.6
17	(Slovenia) Anže Semenič	2	235.3	30	208.4	DSQ	22	169.6	167.5	17	195.3	193.6	1169.7
18	(Norway) Anders Fannemel	17	208.1	5	214.2	218.9	DNS	—	—	11	210.9	208.9	1061.0
19	(Norway) Daniel-André Tande	41	186.0	DNQ	—	—	1	213.1	214.2	3	223.9	215.7	1059.2
20	(Slovenia) Robert Kranjec	21	203.4	10	194.9	217.8	10	196.2	179.1	DNS	—	—	991.4
21	(Norway) Halvor Egner Granerud	13	213.5	28	197.4	166.9	DNS	—	—	20	187.0	190.2	955.0
22	(Russia) Denis Kornilov	18	206.4	22	187.4	202.4	20	172.1	168.2	DNS	—	—	936.5
23	(Austria) Gregor Schlierenzauer	10	214.5	27	195.6	177.7	19	172.4	176.1	DNS	—	—	936.3
24	(Germany) Andreas Wellinger	56	165.9	DNQ	—	—	16	177.6	182.0	16	195.7	201.2	922.4
25	(Germany) Pius Paschke	30	197.0	26	185.2	193.0	DNS	—	—	28	167.9	170.6	913.7
26	(Poland) Piotr Żyła	47	181.2	DNQ	—	—	21	171.2	167.7	27	178.7	169.0	867.8
27	(Austria) Clemens Aigner	49	174.1	DNQ	—	—	27	165.6	159.4	26	164.0	184.9	848.0
28	(Poland) Maciej Kot	15	212.9	31	184.2	DNQ	DNS	—	—	19	193.2	184.5	774.8
29	(United States) Kevin Bickner	33	195.1	16	191.7	209.2	34	171.7	DNQ	DNS	—	—	767.7
30	(Slovenia) Jernej Damjan	14	213.2	40	140.1	DNQ	DNS	—	—	23	185.2	185.3	723.8
31	(Japan) Yukiya Satō	24	201.4	33	177.3	DNQ		158.3	168.0	DNS	—	—	705.0
32	(Japan) Taku Takeuchi	39	187.1	37	161.5	DNQ	DNS	—	—	29	161.3	169.1	679.0
33	(Slovenia) Jurij Tepeš	16	210.5	12	204.1	207.0	DNS	—	—	DNS	—	—	621.6
34	(Slovenia) Tomaž Naglič	28	198.8	17	203.2	197.3	DNS	—	—	DNS	—	—	599.3
35	(Germany) Karl Geiger	57	165.7	DNQ	—	—	DNS	—	—	8	211.8	215.1	592.6
36	(Slovenia) Domen Prevc	53	173.1	DNQ	—	—	3	206.7	205.7	DNS	—	—	585.5
37	(Slovenia) Bor Pavlovčič	40	186.7	18	207.7	190.8	DNS	—	—	DNS	—	—	585.2
38	(Germany) Andreas Wank	36	189.1	23	193.0	194.4	DNS	—	—	DNS	—	—	576.5
39	(Slovenia) Žiga Jelar	38	188.5	24	189.4	195.7	DNS	—	—	DNS	—	—	573.6
40	(Slovenia) Tilen Bartol	43	184.1	DNQ	—	—	DNS	—	—	18	196.2	190.0	570.3
41	(Poland) Jakub Wolny	35	192.3	29	184.9	162.1	DNS	—	—	DNS	—	—	539.3
42	(Italy) Alex Insam	29	197.8	35	173.0	DNQ	33	160.0	DNQ	DNS	—	—	530.8
	(Austria) Manuel Fettner	20	203.8	36	171.7	DNQ	DNS	—	—	31	155.3	DNQ	530.8
44	(Russia) Evgeniy Klimov	60	149.4	DNQ	—	—	23	161.7	172.5	DNS	—	—	483.6
45	(Switzerland) Andreas Schuler	52	173.3	DNQ	—	—	28	149.5	144.0	DNS	—	—	466.8
46	(Switzerland) Gregor Deschwanden	42	184.5	DNQ	—	—	29	144.1	133.4	DNS	—	—	462.0
47	(Russia) Mikhail Nazarov	54	172.5	DNQ	—	—	30	116.8	150.8	DNS	—	—	440.1
48	(Russia) Alexey Romashov	64	138.5	DNQ	—	—	31	122.2	132.2	DNS	—	—	392.9
49	(Switzerland) Luca Egloff	61	147.2	DNQ	—	—	32	99.0	146.1	DNS	—	—	392.3
50	(Czech Republic) Čestmír Kožíšek	19	206.2	34	174.5	DNQ	DNS	—	—	DNS	—	—	380.7
51	(Norway) Marius Lindvik	34	192.8	32	179.3	DNQ	DNS	—	—	DNS	—	—	372.1
52	(Austria) Michael Hayböck	34	DNS	—	DNS	—	DNS	—	—	24	188.6	180.3	368.9
53	(Slovenia) Anže Lanišek	32	195.7	38	161.3	DNQ	DNS	—	—	DNS	—	—	357.0
54	(Slovenia) Cene Prevc	37	188.7	39	155.2	DNQ	DNS	—	—	DNS	—	—	349.9
55	(United States) Michael Glasder	55	166.8	DNQ	—	—	36	125.9	DNQ	DNS	—	—	292.7
56	(Italy) Sebastian Colloredo	58	154.9	DNQ	—	—	35	127.8	DNQ	DNS	—	—	282.7
57	(United States) Casey Larson	59	150.7	DNQ	—	—	38	92.9	DNQ	DNS	—	—	243.6
58	(Italy) Federico Cecon	62	143.0	DNQ	—	—	40	86.7	DNQ	DNS	—	—	229.7
59	(Finland) Andreas Alamommo	43	184.1	DNQ	—	—	DNS	—	—	DNS	—	—	184.1
60	(Bulgaria) Vladimir Zografski	45	183.1	DNQ	—	—	DNS	—	—	DNS	—	—	183.1
61	(Austria) Philipp Aschenwald	46	182.4	DNQ	—	—	DNS	—	—	DNS	—	—	182.4
62	(Slovenia) Nejc Dežman	48	177.3	DNQ	—	—	DNS	—	—	DNS	—	—	177.3
63	(Finland) Antti Aalto	50	173.5	DNQ	—	—	DNS	—	—	DNS	—	—	173.5
64	(Canada) Mackenzie Boyd-Clowes	51	173.4	DNQ	—	—	DNS	—	—	DNS	—	—	173.4
65	(United States) William Rhoads	67	77.3	DNQ	—	—	39	90.6	DNQ	DNS	—	—	167.9
66	(Estonia) Martti Nomme	63	140.3	DNQ	—	—	DNS	—	—	DNS	—	—	140.3
67	(Estonia) Artti Aigro	65	133.1	DNQ	—	—	DNS	—	—	DNS	—	—	133.1
68	(Italy) Roberto Dellasega	69	12.9	DNQ	—	—	37	100.7	DNQ	DNS	—	—	113.6
69	(Kazakhstan) Marat Zhaparov	66	83.6	DNQ	—	—	DNS	—	—	DNS	—	—	83.6
70	(Kazakhstan) Konstantin Sokolenko	68	66.7	DNQ	—	—	DNS	—	—	DNS	—	—	66.7
