= Raw Air 2018 =

Skiing competition held in Norway

Winners
- Raw Air overall: (Poland) Kamil Stoch

Competitions
- Venues: 4
- Individual: 10
- Team: 2

The Raw Air 2018 is the second edition of Raw Air, a ten-day tournament for men in ski jumping and ski flying. It was held across Norway between 9–18 March 2018, and is part of the 2017/18 World Cup season.

== Competition ==
=== Format ===
The competition is held on four different hills in Oslo, Lillehammer, Trondheim, and Vikersund. It lasts for ten consecutive days with a total of 16 rounds from individual events, team events and qualifications (prologues).

	Events	Rounds
Individual	4	8 (4x2)
Qualifications (prologue)	4	4 (4x1)
Team	2	4 (2x2)
Total	10	16

=== Nations ===
Nation	Total	Competitors
Norway	13	Aune, Granerud Buskum, Bjøreng, Ringen, Pedersen, Hilde, Fannemel, Lindvik, Granerud, Johansson, Forfang, Tande, Stjernen
Germany	8	Eisenbichler, Freitag, Geiger, Leyhe, Wank, Wellinger, Schmid, Siegel
Slovenia	8	P. Prevc, Bartol, Dežman, Semenič, Damjan, Lanišek, Zajc, D. Prevc
Austria	7	Hayböck, Kraft, Schlierenzauer, Aigner, Aschenwald, Huber, Fettner
Poland	6	Wolny, Hula, Kubacki, Stoch, Kot, Żyła
Japan	5	Sato, Kasai, J. Kobayashi, R. Kobayashi, Takeuchi
Switzerland	5	Ammann, Deschwanden, Schuler, Hauswirth, Peier
Italy	4	Bresadola, Colloredo, Dellasega, Insam
Kazakhstan	4	Korolev, Muminov, Sokolenko, Zhaparov
Russia	4	Kornilov, Klimov, Nazarov, Romashov
France	2	Learoyd, Dupland
Turkey	2	İpcioğlu, Demir
Czech Republic	2	Koudelka, Kožíšek
United States	2	Bickner, Glasder
Finland	2	Aalto, Alamommo
Canada	1	Boyd-Clowes
Bulgaria	1	Zografski
Estonia	1	Nõmme

== Schedule ==
=== Map of hosts ===
Raw Air 2018 (Norway)

=== Individual ===
No.	Season	Date	Place	Hill	Size	Winner	Second	Third	Event	Rounds	Raw Air bib	Ref.
1	11	9 March 2018	(Norway) Oslo	Holmenkollbakken HS134	LH	(Poland) Kamil Stoch	(Norway) Robert Johansson	(Germany) Richard Freitag	prologue	1R	(Poland) Kamil Stoch	
2	12	10 March 2018	(Norway) Oslo	Holmenkollbakken HS134 (night)	LH	(Poland) Kamil Stoch	(Norway) Robert Johansson	(Germany) Andreas Wellinger	team	2R	(Poland) Kamil Stoch	
3	13	11 March 2018	(Norway) Oslo	Holmenkollbakken HS134	LH	(Norway) Daniel-André Tande	(Austria) Stefan Kraft	(Austria) Michael Hayboeck	individual	2R	(Poland) Kamil Stoch	
4	14	12 March 2018	(Norway) Lillehammer	Lysgårdsbakken HS140 (night)	LH	(Poland) Kamil Stoch	(Poland) Dawid Kubacki	(Norway) Robert Johansson	prologue	1R	(Poland) Kamil Stoch	
5	15	13 March 2018	(Norway) Lillehammer	Lysgårdsbakken HS140	LH	(Poland) Kamil Stoch	(Poland) Dawid Kubacki	(Norway) Robert Johansson	individual	2R	(Poland) Kamil Stoch	
6	16	14 March 2018	(Norway) Trondheim	Granåsen HS140 (night)	LH	(Poland) Kamil Stoch	(Norway) Andreas Stjernen	(Austria) Stefan Kraft	prologue	1R	(Poland) Kamil Stoch	
7	17	15 March 2018	(Norway) Trondheim	Granåsen HS140 (night)	LH	(Poland) Kamil Stoch	(Austria) Stefan Kraft	(Norway) Robert Johansson	individual	2R	(Poland) Kamil Stoch	
8	18	16 March 2018	(Norway) Vikersund	Vikersundbakken HS240 (night)	FH	(Poland) Kamil Stoch	(Norway) Robert Johansson	(Norway) Andreas Stjernen	prologue	1R	(Poland) Kamil Stoch	
9	19	17 March 2018	(Norway) Vikersund	Vikersundbakken HS240	FH	(Austria) Stefan Kraft	(Norway) Robert Johansson	(Norway) Daniel-André Tande	team	2R	(Poland) Kamil Stoch	
10	20	18 March 2017	(Norway) Vikersund	Vikersundbakken HS240	FH	(Norway) Robert Johansson	(Norway) Andreas Stjernen	(Norway) Daniel-André Tande	individual	2R	(Poland) Kamil Stoch	
2nd Raw Air Overall						(Poland) Kamil Stoch	(Norway) Robert Johansson	(Norway) Andreas Stjernen		16R		

=== Team ===
No.	Season	Date	Place	Hill	Size	Winner	Second	Third	Note	Ref.
1	3	10 March 2018	(Norway) Oslo	Holmenkollbakken HS134	LH	Norway Daniel-André Tande; Andreas Stjernen; Johann André Forfang; Robert Johansson	Poland Maciej Kot; Stefan Hula; Dawid Kubacki; Kamil Stoch	Austria Gregor Schlierenzauer; Clemens Aigner; Michael Hayböck; Stefan Kraft	both rounds count individual in Raw Air overall	
2	4	17 March 2018	(Norway) Vikersund	Vikersundbakken HS225	FH	Norway Daniel-André Tande; Andreas Stjernen; Johann André Forfang; Robert Johansson	Poland Piotr Żyła; Stefan Hula; Dawid Kubacki; Kamil Stoch	Slovenia Domen Prevc; Jernej Damjan; Tilen Bartol; Peter Prevc	both rounds count individual in Raw Air overall	

== Standings ==
=== Raw Air ===
Rank	After 10 of 10 events	09/03/2018 Oslo		10/03/2018 Oslo			11/03/2018 Oslo			12/03/2018 Lillehammer		13/03/2018 Lillehammer			14/03/2018 Trondheim		15/03/2018 Trondheim			16/03/2018 Vikersund		17/03/2018 Vikersund			18/03/2018 Vikersund			Total points (16/16)
Rank	After 10 of 10 events	Prologue (Q)		Team (2R)			Individual (2R)			Prologue (Q)		Individual (2R)			Prologue (Q)		Individual (2R)			Prologue (Q)		Team (2R)			Individual (2R)			Total points (16/16)
Rank	After 10 of 10 events	Rank	Points (R1)	Rank	Points (R2)	Points (R3)	Rank	Points (R4)	Points (R5)	Rank	Points (R6)	Rank	Points (R7)	Points (R8)	Rank	Points (R9)	Rank	Points (R10)	Points (R11)	Rank	Points (R12)	Rank	Points (R13)	Points (R14)	Rank	Points (R15)	Points (R16)	Total points (16/16)
1st place, gold medalist(s)	(Poland) Kamil Stoch	1	143.2	1	140.8	144.8	6	138.5	114.5	1	153.3	1	153.0	153.4	1	155.4	1	143.9	141.5	1	207.1	6	186.1	189.5	6	204.0	221.6	2590.6
2nd place, silver medalist(s)	(Norway) Robert Johansson	2	137.0	2	141.0	143.3	4	126.6	127.4	3	136.3	3	134.9	138.8	4	141.4	3	140.5	127.5	2	205.6	2	210.2	198.8	1	220.4	223.9	2553.6
3rd place, bronze medalist(s)	(Norway) Andreas Stjernen	6	131.1	5	135.6	138.0	9	124.6	116.0	4	135.7	4	133.1	139.4	2	153.1	4	132.6	131.0	3	203.2	4	203.0	193.0	2	222.8	216.1	2508.3
4	(Austria) Stefan Kraft	8	126.6	8	131.5	133.2	2	133.1	123.6	6	132.5	8	134.3	127.9	3	147.5	2	134.0	134.4	5	185.4	1	201.6	208.8	5	209.5	217.0	2480.9
5	(Norway) Daniel-André Tande	10	125.2	7	129.3	137.8	1	125.0	133.1	10	130.6	10	133.6	124.1	10	135.1	15	108.5	119.3	11	172.8	3	212.9	184.4	3	213.8	222.8	2408.3
6	(Norway) Johann André Forfang	4	134.3	4	133.5	140.2	5	120.9	132.7	15	125.9	6	134.4	133.6	9	136.1	6	131.5	121.2	9	175.2	7	189.5	175.5	9	200.3	208.0	2392.8
7	(Germany) Richard Freitag	3	135.1	9	134.5	122.2	8	120.4	120.6	19	122.7	5	136.1	135.0	5	141.2	5	124.7	130.0	6	179.0	12	147.8	169.2	8	201.5	213.1	2333.1
8	(Poland) Dawid Kubacki	5	132.3	6	131.7	138.8	26	123.6	99.3	2	136.4	2	138.6	140.1	8	137.6	9	121.8	125.3	10	173.8	15	158.4	148.3	16	178.4	202.0	2286.4
9	(Germany) Markus Eisenbichler	14	123.2	19	124.0	117.0	32	106.8	DNQ	27	119.1	16	117.4	133.2	19	125.3	10	111.3	122.9	4	187.4	5	206.9	178.6	7	212.3	208.5	2194.6
10	(Slovenia) Peter Prevc	16	122.1	11	131.6	126.9	46	95.6	DNQ	5	133.9	7	131.7	131.7	7	137.7	8	123.8	124.9	16	169.8	8	182.0	168.9	14	172.0	213.3	2165.9
11	(Japan) Ryōyū Kobayashi	9	125.8	9	120.7	138.1	19	117.2	113.8	14	127.2	19	126.8	119.9	13	130.7	13	121.7	107.6	7	176.5	22	117.8	133.7	22	175.6	187.0	2140.1
12	(Switzerland) Simon Ammann	22	120.7	14	128.8	124.4	18	111.3	120.8	17	124.6	15	121.1	130.2	23	122.4	23	103.5	107.0	19	166.8	19	112.4	164.9	21	167.1	197.0	2123.0
13	(Poland) Stefan Hula	15	122.9	17	120.0	122.5	42	97.5	DNQ	13	128.6	9	136.2	125.5	15	130.3	11	113.4	118.6	14	170.8	17	153.1	151.0	17	186.9	192.5	2069.8
14	(Slovenia) Tilen Bartol	41	110.5	21	114.3	126.5	28	128.6	91.6	28	119.0	24	121.1	114.5	34	113.8	33	99.1	DNQ	8	176.2	9	168.4	173.8	13	205.8	185.7	2048.9
15	(Slovenia) Jernej Damjan	23	119.2	13	125.5	128.1	10	124.1	113.3	23	121.2	40	105.8	DNQ	17	129.8	18	111.2	110.9	20	166.4	10	169.8	161.1	24	187.2	169.4	2043.0
16	(Japan) Junshirō Kobayashi	21	120.8	22	113.8	126.0	34	106.7	DNQ	21	122.2	17	131.3	119.2	12	133.9	17	114.4	109.0	25	162.1	16	163.8	141.5	23	180.2	180.8	2025.7
17	(Austria) Michael Hayböck	33	112.9	18	117.0	125.2	3	129.2	126.4	31	117.7	44	99.8	DNQ	49	105.3	19	109.6	112.1	31	155.0	11	170.9	159.6	25	171.9	179.2	1991.8
18	(Poland) Piotr Żyła	44	109.0	DNS	—	—	19	116.3	114.7	16	125.3	14	124.7	128.1	15	130.3	12	114.8	116.4	32	154.3	13	193.0	122.3	12	196.7	198.8	1944.7
19	(Germany) Andreas Wellinger	7	126.9	3	136.0	139.3	15	126.5	106.7	22	121.8	13	128.1	125.0	6	138.1	22	113.5	103.4	22	165.3	23	122.2	129.2	36	147.2	DNQ	1929.2
20	(Germany) Karl Geiger	25	117.1	23	114.1	122.0	14	123.0	111.9	11	129.7	11	127.5	128.8	13	130.7	7	119.7	129.3	12	172.7	24	113.8	132.3	34	150.4	DNQ	1923.0
21	(Japan) Yukiya Sato	18	121.6	16	130.7	115.9	27	109.4	111.2	7	131.8	—	DSQ	DNQ	39	111.0	37	94.5	DNQ	18	168.5	14	147.5	167.0	20	166.8	199.0	1774.9
22	(Norway) Halvor Egner Granerud	12	124.6	DNS	—	—	12	116.0	120.3	12	129.2	12	126.8	128.8	20	124.6	14	115.5	112.7	23	164.7	DNS	—	—	11	192.8	203.6	1659.6
23	(Russia) Denis Kornilov	55	100.3	26	104.9	117.6	DNQ	—	—	47	105.4	33	112.0	DNQ	50	105.0	30	102.5	68.3	13	171.0	18	167.0	116.8	19	190.3	180.9	1642.0
24	(Japan) Noriaki Kasai	39	111.1	DNS	—	—	30	114.7	86.2	26	119.4	18	127.8	121.1	47	106.3	46	77.4	DNQ	17	169.0	26	45.9	156.4	10	201.3	195.2	1631.8
25	(Germany) Stephan Leyhe	20	121.4	DNS	—	—	7	121.9	120.6	28	119.0	26	117.9	113.1	21	124.2	20	116.2	104.4	15	170.7	DNS	—	—	15	182.8	198.4	1610.6
26	(Slovenia) Nejc Dežman	33	112.9	27	110.6	111.0	36	104.9	DNQ	24	120.8	28	115.3	114.2	31	116.2	39	93.8	DNQ	21	165.8	DNS	—	—	28	167.2	156.4	1489.1
27	(Poland) Jakub Wolny	42	110.1	DNS	—	—	22	117.9	110.1	30	118.9	20	123.7	115.9	25	121.4	28	104.7	84.5	39	139.0	DNS	—	—	27	178.4	161.1	1485.7
28	(Austria) Philipp Aschenwald	30	114.2	DNS	—	—	11	119.5	117.6	20	122.4	21	120.9	117.2	27	120.2	31	101.9	DNQ	24	163.6	27	81.0	93.8	39	128.1	DNQ	1400.4
29	(Austria) Gregor Schlierenzauer	13	123.8	12	129.3	126.5	17	117.7	115.4	9	131.0	25	118.3	114.9	53	100.6	DNQ	—	—	38	141.4	DNS	—	—	38	129.8	DNQ	1348.7
30	(Norway) Marius Lindvik	11	124.7	DNS	—	—	21	109.0	120.3	18	124.3	30	116.9	109.3	18	128.7	25	107.7	98.9	40	133.8	DNS	—	—	37	146.2	DNQ	1319.8
31	(Norway) Anders Fannemel	18	121.6	DNS	—	—	40	99.8	DNQ	46	106.6	29	115.0	112.8	40	110.3	36	97.1	DNQ	37	144.4	DNS	—	—	18	191.7	179.9	1279.2
32	(Poland) Maciej Kot	56	99.8	20	120.3	120.9	DNQ	—	—	37	113.3	31	114.8	DNQ	11	134.6	16	117.6	109.4	26	161.7	DNS	—	—	31	163.5	DNQ	1255.9
33	(United States) Kevin Bickner	24	118.3	DNS	—	—	36	104.9	DNQ	32	117.4	34	111.7	DNQ	30	116.9	26	104.0	100.9	29	155.6	DNS	—	—	30	180.7	125.4	1235.8
34	(Russia) Evgeniy Klimov	43	110.0	28	108.1	105.0	50	70.6	DNQ	53	100.0	DNQ	—	—	38	111.8	32	100.5	DNQ	35	145.4	25	93.9	109.7	33	156.3	DNQ	1211.3
35	(Italy) Alex Insam	37	112.1	33	87.7	DNQ	43	96.7	DNQ	52	102.8	DNQ	—	—	42	109.9	43	87.0	DNQ	30	155.4	33	92.1	DNQ	26	172.3	177.1	1193.1
36	(Switzerland) Andreas Schuler	49	104.3	25	108.5	117.0	29	109.9	96.9	45	107.1	43	101.5	DNQ	36	112.0	47	73.2	DNQ	45	106.0	30	67.4	63.9	DNQ	—	—	1167.7
37	(Germany) Andreas Wank	28	116.3	DNS	—	—	12	114.9	121.4	36	113.4	23	118.4	119.4	22	123.6	24	109.0	99.0	41	127.8	DNS	—	—	DNQ	—	—	1163.2
38	(Switzerland) Gregor Deschwanden	32	113.2	29	104.2	100.2	31	107.6	DNQ	39	110.2	46	98.0	DNQ	35	112.3	45	81.8	DNQ	42	125.7	28	63.9	97.4	DNQ	—	—	1114.5
39	(Bulgaria) Vladimir Zografski	31	114.0	DNS	—	—	32	106.8	DNQ	8	131.6	38	106.4	DNQ	28	118.0	21	112.2	108.3	36	144.5	DNS	—	—	32	158.7	DNQ	1100.5
40	(Austria) Clemens Aigner	25	117.1	15	121.6	125.9	23	114.6	112.9	33	116.3	37	106.7	DNQ	46	107.3	35	97.2	DNQ	49	77.6	DNS	—	—	DNQ	—	—	1097.2
41	(Canada) Mackenzie Boyd-Clowes	35	112.8	DNS	—	—	15	111.0	122.2	38	112.4	27	117.8	112.8	24	121.9	44	84.8	DNQ	DNS	—	DNS	—	—	DNQ	—	—	895.7
42	(Russia) Mikhail Nazarov	66	83.5	30	104.3	95.3	DNQ	—	—	44	107.8	44	99.8	DNQ	45	107.4	49	69.0	DNQ	53	66.4		70.7	82.2	DNQ	—	—	886.4
43	(Japan) Taku Takeuchi	54	102.1	24	116.1	115.3	DNQ	—	—	47	105.4	36	108.4	DNQ	48	106.2	37	94.5	DNQ	46	100.9	DNS	—	—	DNQ	—	—	848.9
44	(Slovenia) Domen Prevc	DNS	—	DNS	—	—	DNQ	—	—	DNS	—	DNQ	—	—	DNS	—	DNQ	—	—	27	157.1	20	191.5	68.5	4	207.4	223.9	848.4
45	(Slovenia) Anže Lanišek	50	103.9	DNS	—	—	39	101.9	DNQ	64	72.0	DNQ	—	—	36	112.0	34	98.0	DNQ	28	156.4	DNS	—	—	35	147.6	DNQ	791.8
46	(France) Jonathan Learoyd	36	112.6	DNS	—	—	25	126.3	96.7	34	114.2	41	105.2	DNQ	32	114.8	41	90.2	DNQ	DNS	—	DNS	—	—	DNQ	—	—	760.0
47	(Slovenia) Timi Zajc	48	104.9	DNS	—	—	43	96.7	DNQ	34	114.2	35	108.5	DNQ	26	120.5	27	107.5	97.0	DNS	—	DNS	—	—	DNQ	—	—	749.3
48	(Austria) Daniel Huber	27	116.8	DNS	—	—	24	111.1	114.3	54	99.4	DNQ	—	—	33	114.3	29	105.3	82.6	DNS	—	DNS	—	—	DNQ	—	—	743.8
49	(Italy) Sebastian Colloredo	38	111.5	35	81.2	DNQ	49	85.4	DNQ	40	109.6	47	94.0	DNQ	51	103.5	DNQ	—	—	47	86.6	24	45.3	DNQ	DNQ	—	—	739.7
50	(Austria) Manuel Fettner	DNS	—	DNS	—	—	DNQ	—	—	DNS	—	DNQ	—	—	DNS	—	DNQ	—	—	33	147.0	21	129.9	127.2	29	174.1	138.6	716.8
51	(Russia) Alexey Romashov	53	102.3	31	96.7	102.4	DNQ	—	—	62	82.6	DNQ	—	—	55	93.1	DNQ	—	—	55	54.1	32	23.1	71.6	DNQ	—	—	625.9
52	(Slovenia) Anže Semenič	65	87.0	DNS	—	—	DNQ	—	—	43	108.1	48	83.0	DNQ	43	108.9	48	69.2	DNQ	44	107.2	DNS	—	—	DNQ	—	—	563.4
53	(Finland) Antti Aalto	52	102.9	DNS	—	—	DNQ	—	—	DSQ	—	DNQ	—	—	41	110.0	40	91.6	DNQ	34	146.9	DNS	—	—	40	81.9	DNQ	533.3
54	(Czech Republic) Čestmír Kožíšek	51	103.2	DNS	—	—	DNQ	—	—	51	105.0	DNQ	—	—	43	108.9	42	87.9	DNQ	43	118.9	DNS	—	—	DNQ	—	—	523.9
55	(Czech Republic) Roman Koudelka	29	115.9	DNS	—	—	48	88.2	DNQ	42	108.8	49	79.1	DNQ	52	102.4	DNQ	—	—	DNS	—	DNS	—	—	DNQ	—	—	494.4
56	(Germany) David Siegel	DNS	—	DNS	—	—	DNS	—	—	25	119.5	32	113.0	DNQ	29	117.7	50	62.4	DNQ	51	72.5	DNS	—	—	DNQ	—	—	485.1
57	(Norway) Sondre Ringen	61	96.5	DNS	—	—	DNQ	—	—	41	109.0	22	115.6	122.4	DNS	—	DNQ	—	—	DNS	—	DNS	—	—	DNQ	—	—	443.5
58	(Italy) Davide Bresadola	62	95.8	34	85.9	DNQ	DNQ	—	—	61	84.5	DNQ	—	—	59	80.1	DNQ	—	—	56	41.8	36	33.9	DNQ	DNQ	—	—	422.0
59	(Norway) Tom Hilde	40	110.6	DNS	—	—	40	99.8	DNQ	49	105.3	39	106.2	DNQ	DNS	—	DNQ	—	—	DNS	—	DNS	—	—	DNQ	—	—	421.9
60	(Norway) Robin Pedersen	47	105.3	DNS	—	—	38	103.5	DNQ	50	105.2	42	103.9	DNQ	DNS	—	DNQ	—	—	DNS	—	DNS	—	—	DNQ	—	—	417.9
61	(Switzerland) Killian Peier	45	108.8	32	93.5	102.4	47	89.5	DNQ	DNS	—	DNQ	—	—	DNS	—	DNQ	—	—	DNS	—	DNS	—	—	DNQ	—	—	394.2
62	(Italy) Roberto Dellasega	69	69.6	35	81.2	DNQ	DNQ	—	—	66	67.0	DNQ	—	—	61	72.7	DNQ	—	—	54	56.7	35	38.2	DNQ	DNQ	—	—	385.4
63	(United States) Michael Glasder	59	96.7	DNS	—	—	DNQ	—	—	63	79.2	DNQ	—	—	54	97.3	DNQ	—	—	47	86.6	DNS	—	—	DNQ	—	—	359.8
64	(Switzerland) Sandro Hauswirth	DNS	—	DNS	—	—	DNS	—	—	54	96.5	DNQ	—	—	56	89.9	DNQ	—	—	50	74.6	31	43.4	51.6	DNQ	—	—	356.0
65	(Estonia) Martti Nõmme	59	96.7	DNS	—	—	DNQ	—	—	59	86.4	DNQ	—	—	58	84.2	DNQ	—	—	52	68.0	DNS	—	—	DNQ	—	—	335.3
66	(Norway) Joacim Ødegård Bjøreng	46	106.0	DNS	—	—	45	96.4	DNQ	55	98.2	DNQ	—	—	DNS	—	DNQ	—	—	DNS	—	DNS	—	—	DNQ	—	—	300.6
67	(Kazakhstan) Sabrirzhan Muminov	68	73.0	37	66.0	DNQ	DNQ	—	—	64	72.0	DNQ	—	—	60	78.0	DNQ	—	—	DNS	—	DNS	—	—	DNQ	—	—	289.0
68	(Kazakhstan) Marat Zhaparov	67	82.0	38	55.8	DNQ	DNQ	—	—	68	62.1	DNQ	—	—	62	59.8	DNQ	—	—	58	12.2	DNS	—	—	DNQ	—	—	271.9
69	(France) Thomas Roch Dupland	63	93.4	DNS	—	—	DNQ	—	—	60	85.2	DNQ	—	—	57	84.5	DNQ	—	—	DNS	—	DNS	—	—	DNQ	—	—	263.1
70	(Kazakhstan) Alexey Korolev	71	55.6	39	46.7	DNQ	DNQ	—	—	67	64.6	DNQ	—	—	63	58.2	DNQ	—	—	57	32.9	DNS	—	—	DNQ	—	—	258.0
71	(Germany) Constantin Schmid	16	122.1	DNS	—	—	35	105.2	DNQ	DNS	—	DNQ	—	—	DNS	—	DNQ	—	—	DNS	—	DNS	—	—	DNQ	—	—	227.3
72	(Norway) Andreas Granerud Buskum	58	98.3	DNS	—	—	DNQ	—	—	57	94.9	DNQ	—	—	DNS	—	DNQ	—	—	DNS	—	DNS	—	—	DNQ	—	—	193.2
73	(Norway) Joakim Aune	57	99.1	DNS	—	—	DNQ	—	—	58	89.5	DNQ	—	—	DNS	—	DNQ	—	—	DNS	—	DNS	—	—	DNQ	—	—	188.6
74	(Turkey) Fatih Arda İpcioğlu	70	59.5	DNS	—	—	DNQ	—	—	69	56.8	DNQ	—	—	64	57.0	DNQ	—	—	DNS	—	DNS	—	—	DNQ	—	—	173.3
75	(Kazakhstan) Konstantin Sokolenko	DNS	—	40	46.9	DNQ	DNQ	—	—	71	28.2	DNQ	—	—	66	30.3	DNQ	—	—	DNS	—	DNS	—	—	DNQ	—	—	152.1
76	(Turkey) Ayberk Demir	72	52.0	DNS	—	—	DNQ	—	—	70	29.7	DNQ	—	—	65	49.2	DNQ	—	—	DNS	—	DNS	—	—	DNQ	—	—	130.9
77	(Finland) Andreas Alamommo	64	88.6	DNS	—	—	DNQ	—	—	DNS	—	DNQ	—	—	DNS	—	DNQ	—	—	DNS	—	DNS	—	—	DNQ	—	—	88.6

competitor scored points in all rounds of the Tournament
