= Willingen Five 2018 =

Men's ski jumping tournament

Winners
- Willingen Five Overall: (Poland) Kamil Stoch

Competitions
- Venues: 1
- Individual: 2

The Willingen Five 2018 was the first edition of Willingen Five, a three-day tournament for men in ski jumping in Willingen between 2–4 February 2018. It was part of the 2017/18 World Cup season. A total of five rounds counted in the final standings: Friday's qualification round, two individual competition rounds from Saturday and two from Sunday. The Willingen Five overall winner was awarded with an extra €25,000. The director of the competition was Tobias Lindner.

The competition was founded by the President of SC Wilingen, Jürgen Hensel, and World Cup director Walter Hofer.

== Competition ==
=== Format ===
	Events	Rounds
Individual	2	4 (2x2)
Qualification round	1	1 (1x1)
Total	3	5

Willingen Five 2018 (Germany)

== Schedule ==
=== Individual ===
No.	Season	Date	Place	Hill	Size	Winner	Second	Third	Event	Rounds	Willingen Five bib	Ref.
1	1	2 February 2018	(Germany) Willingen	Mühlenkopfschanze HS145 (night)	LH	(Poland) Kamil Stoch	(Germany) Richard Freitag	(Norway) Daniel-André Tande	qualifications	1R	(Poland) Kamil Stoch	
2	2	3 February 2018	(Germany) Willingen	Mühlenkopfschanze HS145 (night)	LH	(Norway) Daniel-André Tande	(Germany) Richard Freitag	(Poland) Dawid Kubacki	individual	2R	(Norway) Daniel-André Tande	
3	3	4 February 2018	(Germany) Willingen	Mühlenkopfschanze HS145	LH	(Norway) Johann Andre Forfang	(Poland) Kamil Stoch	(Poland) Piotr Żyła	individual	2R	(Poland) Kamil Stoch	
1st Willingen Five Overall						(Poland) Kamil Stoch	(Norway) Johann Andre Forfang	(Norway) Daniel-André Tande		5R		

== Standings ==
=== Willingen Five ===
Rank	After 3 events	02/02/2018		03/02/2018			04/02/2018			Total points (5)
Rank	After 3 events	Qualifying (Q)		Individual (2R)			Individual (2R)			Total points (5)
Rank	After 3 events	Rank	Points (R1)	Rank	Points (R2)	Points (R3)	Rank	Points (R4)	Points (R5)	Total points (5)
1st place, gold medalist(s)	(Poland) Kamil Stoch	1	133.9	4	135.9	118.6	2	135.7	133.7	657.8
2nd place, silver medalist(s)	(Norway) Johann André Forfang	4	131.0	7	114.6	133.0	1	139.9	131.5	650.0
3rd place, bronze medalist(s)	(Norway) Daniel-André Tande	3	131.7	1	128.1	133.2	5	116.4	124.1	633.5
4	(Norway) Robert Johansson	10	125.5	8	119.8	125.9	4	118.7	124.3	614.2
5	(Germany) Andreas Wellinger	12	121.4	5	127.7	124.9	10	115.9	117.2	607.1
6	(Poland) Dawid Kubacki	17	115.5	3	128.4	126.4	7	127.6	109.0	606.9
7	(Poland) Stefan Hula	9	125.6	6	125.5	123.4	12	103.2	127.8	605.5
8	(Germany) Markus Eisenbichler	11	122.7	12	110.9	122.1	6	127.4	109.3	592.4
9	(Poland) Piotr Żyła	18	115.0	13	116.6	113.6	3	126.5	118.6	590.3
10	(Slovenia) Tilen Bartol	5	129.9	10	125.1	110.3	17	100.1	119.5	584.9
11	(Germany) Richard Freitag	2	132.0	2	132.2	128.3	28	113.7	76.4	582.6
12	(Norway) Anders Fannemel	13	119.9	11	117.8	117.2	16	124.9	95.1	574.9
13	(Slovenia) Anže Semenič	6	127.6	15	119.0	104.7	15	122.4	99.8	573.5
14	(Germany) Stephan Leyhe	7	127.5	16	115.1	107.7	18	121.2	93.6	565.1
15	(Slovenia) Nejc Dežman	16	116.0	22	113.5	99.7	9	127.5	108.1	564.8
16	(Austria) Daniel Huber	14	116.7	9	126.7	115.6	24	110.6	90.3	559.9
17	(Poland) Maciej Kot	26	107.3	21	106.1	107.4	8	122.8	113.4	557.0
18	(Slovenia) Jernej Damjan	8	125.8	24	108.0	89.9	14	112.1	111.0	546.8
19	(Norway) Halvor Egner Granerud	21	112.0	17	109.4	111.5	19	125.7	83.4	542.0
20	(Germany) Karl Geiger	26	107.3	14	121.7	107.0	22	105.1	100.8	541.9
21	(Slovenia) Peter Prevc	24	110.4	20	116.1	98.9	20	98.9	107.7	532.0
22	(Norway) Andreas Stjernen	23	111.3	19	116.0	100.4	26	97.1	99.1	523.9
23	(Japan) Yukiya Satō	32	101.8	29	101.4	75.4	11	115.7	116.0	510.3
24	(Austria) Ulrich Wohlgenannt	28	106.6	26	94.8	102.6	27	98.4	92.2	494.6
25	(Canada) MacKenzie Boyd-Clowes	34	100.8	28	97.3	86.3	23	101.9	101.6	487.9
26	(Italy) Alex Insam	20	112.6	31	99.4	71.6	25	108.6	91.8	484.0
27	(Slovenia) Timi Zajc	15	116.1	17	121.7	99.2	41	85.4	DNQ	422.4
28	(Austria) Manuel Poppinger	25	109.7	33	92.2	DNQ	21	105.5	100.6	408.0
29	(United States) Kevin Bickner	22	111.6	25	100.1	97.4	33	95.3	DNQ	404.4
30	(Austria) Florian Altenburger	37	98.8	37	81.1	DNQ	13	120.9	103.3	404.1
31	(Poland) Jakub Wolny	33	101.5	23	94.8	109.3	31	96.6	DNQ	402.2
32	(Japan) Naoki Nakamura	19	114.6	45	67.9	DNQ	29	101.6	87.8	371.9
33	(Finland) Antti Aalto	44	84.9	27	98.2	86.3	37	90.9	DNQ	360.3
34	(Russia) Dmitry Vassiliev	30	102.2	30	102.1	70.8	47	77.6	DNQ	352.7
35	(Switzerland) Gregor Deschwanden	38	97.5	41	76.2	DNQ	30	99.6	63.1	336.4
36	(Italy) Sebastian Colloredo	29	105.8	34	89.6	DNQ	36	91.4	DNQ	286.8
37	(Slovenia) Žiga Jelar	35	100.5	40	79.0	DNQ	32	95.4	DNQ	274.9
38	(Italy) Davide Bresadola	45	82.8	32	94.3	DNQ	39	87.4	DNQ	264.5
39	(Japan) Kento Sakuyama	36	100.4	38	80.3	DNQ	44	82.3	DNQ	263.0
40	(Switzerland) Andreas Schuler	40	94.6	36	82.9	DNQ	42	83.1	DNQ	260.6
41	(Norway) Tom Hilde	31	102.0	46	67.5	DNQ	38	90.4	DNQ	259.9
42	(United States) Michael Glasder	39	96.5	47	62.7	DNQ	35	92.5	DNQ	251.7
43	(United States) William Rhoads	43	87.1	44	71.1	DNQ	40	87.2	DNQ	245.4
44	(Czech Republic) Roman Koudelka	42	87.6	35	89.0	DNQ	54	64.9	DNQ	241.5
45	(Switzerland) Killian Peier	41	88.3	39	79.2	DNQ	49	72.3	DNQ	239.8
46	(Switzerland) Luca Egloff	48	77.5	48	57.4	DNQ	34	95.0	DNQ	229.9
47	(Japan) Yūmu Harada	47	80.1	43	73.1	DNQ	50	72.1	DNQ	225.3
48	(Russia) Ilmir Hazetdinov	50	75.4	42	73.4	DNQ	53	68.6	DNQ	217.4
49	(Russia) Roman Sergeevich Trofimov	46	80.8	49	55.5	DNQ	46	80.0	DNQ	216.3
50	(Russia) Mikhail Maksimochkin	49	76.4	50	21.4	DNQ	52	69.2	DNQ	167.0
51	(Czech Republic) Vojtěch Štursa	52	73.6	q	—	—	48	73.1	DNQ	146.7
52	(Finland) Eetu Nousiainen	54	63.5	q	—	—	43	82.7	DNQ	146.2
53	(Italy) Federico Cecon	51	74.6	q	—	—	51	69.3	DNQ	143.9
54	(Japan) Tomofumi Naito	53	68.2	q	—	—	55	64.4	DNQ	132.6
55	(Germany) David Siegel	DSQ	—	—	—	—	45	81.3	DNQ	81.3
56	(Kazakhstan) Konstantin Sokolenko	55	21.2	q	—	—	56	5.3	DNQ	26.5
