= Hornindal IL =

Norwegian sports club

- Full name: Hornindal Idrettslag
- Founded: 1910
- Ground: Hornindal idrettspark
Home colours

Hornindal Idrettslag (Hornindal IL) is a Norwegian sports club from Grodås in Volda Municipality, Møre og Romsdal county. The club was named Hornindal since it was originally located in Hornindal Municipality, but in 2020, the area was merged into Volda Municipality. The club has sections for association football, volleyball, Nordic skiing, biathlon, and weightlifting.

Notable club members include ski jumper Anders Fannemel. Also, international footballer and later top-level coach Frode Grodås started his career here.
