= 2017–18 FIS Ski Jumping World Cup =

Ski jumping championship season

Discipline	Men	Women
Overall	(Poland) Kamil Stoch	(Norway) Maren Lundby
Nations Cup	Norway	Germany
Ski flying	(Norway) Andreas Stjernen	—

Stage events
Raw Air	(Poland) Kamil Stoch	—
Planica7	(Poland) Kamil Stoch	—
Willingen Five	(Poland) Kamil Stoch	—
Four Hills Tournament	(Poland) Kamil Stoch	—
Lillehammer Triple	—	(Germany) Katharina Althaus

Competition
Edition	39th	7th
Locations	18	8
Individual	22	15
Team	8	2
Cancelled	1	2
Rescheduled	0	2

The 2017–18 FIS Ski Jumping World Cup was the 39th World Cup season in ski jumping for men, the 21st official World Cup season in ski flying, and the 7th World Cup season for women.

Season began on 19 November 2017 in Wisła, Poland and ended on 25 March 2018 in Planica, Slovenia. Women's World Cup began on 1 December 2017 in Lillehammer, Norway and ended on 25 March 2018 in Oberstdorf, Germany.

Kamil Stoch took everything except ski flying title this season. He won his second overall title, Four Hills Tournament, Raw Air, Planica7 and Willingen Five. Nations Cup was taken by Team of Norway. There were 22 individual events (only 1 got cancelled) on 18 different venues in 8 countries; and 8 men's team events (most ever in one season).

The highlight of the women's season with 15 individual events on 8 different venues in 5 countries; was the first edition of the Lillehammer Triple tournament between 1–3 December 2017 in Lillehammer, with a total of three individual events: two on the normal hill and one on the large hill. The best athletes of these three competitions received an additional prize money of €10,000 (divided between the Top 3). Also first event women's team event in history (two in total) was held this season in Hinterzarten. 2 events were cancelled and 2 rescheduled.

The first edition of a new men's competition, the "Willingen Five" Tournament, took place from 2–4 February 2018 in Willingen. A total of five rounds counted in the final standings: Friday's qualification round, two individual competition rounds from Saturday and two individual competition rounds from Sunday. The Willingen Five overall winner was awarded with an extra €25,000.

Also the first edition of a new men's competition, the "Planica7" Tournament, took place from 22–25 March 2018 in Planica. A total of seven rounds counted in the final standings: Thursday's qualification round, two individual competition rounds on Friday, two team competition rounds on Saturday and two individual competition rounds from the season final on Sunday. The Planica 7 overall winner was awarded with an extra 20,000 CHF.

For the first time since the introduction of qualification sessions in the 1990–91 season, the top ten athletes in the World Cup rankings were no longer "pre-qualified", and therefore had to achieve a result good enough for them to qualify for the competition.

== Invalid world record ==
Invalid world record distance achieved within this World Cup season.

Date	Athlete	Hill	Round	Place	Metres	Feet
22 March 2018	(Austria) Gregor Schlierenzauer	Letalnica bratov Gorišek HS240	Qualifications	Planica, Slovenia	253.5	832

2nd longest jump in history at that time (tied with official WR distance), but invalid due to Schlierenzauer (touch) upon landing.

== Map of world cup hosts ==
Europe
Germany	Austria	Asia

== Men's Individual ==
=== Calendar ===
L – large hill / F – flying hill
All	No.	Date	Place (Hill)	Size	Winner	Second	Third	Overall leader	R.
926	1	19 November 2017	(Poland) Wisła (Malinka HS134)	L _{657}	(Japan) Junshirō Kobayashi	(Poland) Kamil Stoch	(Austria) Stefan Kraft	(Japan) Junshirō Kobayashi	
927	2	26 November 2017	(Finland) Ruka (Rukatunturi HS142)	L _{658}	(Slovenia) Jernej Damjan	(Norway) Johann André Forfang	(Germany) Andreas Wellinger	(Japan) Junshirō Kobayashi	
928	3	2 December 2017	(Russia) Nizhny Tagil (Tramplin Stork HS134)	L _{659}	(Germany) Richard Freitag	(Norway) Daniel-André Tande	(Norway) Johann André Forfang	(Germany) Richard Freitag	
929	4	3 December 2017	(Russia) Nizhny Tagil (Tramplin Stork HS134)	L _{660}	(Germany) Andreas Wellinger	(Germany) Richard Freitag	(Austria) Stefan Kraft	(Germany) Richard Freitag	
930	5	(Note: Individual men's event in Titisee-Neustadt (10 December 2017) had only one round due to unstable wind.)10 December 2017	(Germany) Titisee-Neustadt (Hochfirstschanze HS142)	L _{661}	(Germany) Richard Freitag	(Germany) Andreas Wellinger	(Norway) Daniel-André Tande	(Germany) Richard Freitag	
931	6	16 December 2017	(Switzerland) Engelberg (Gross-Titlis-Schanze HS140)	L _{662}	(Norway) Anders Fannemel	(Germany) Richard Freitag	(Poland) Kamil Stoch	(Germany) Richard Freitag	
932	7	17 December 2017	(Switzerland) Engelberg (Gross-Titlis-Schanze HS140)	L _{663}	(Germany) Richard Freitag	(Poland) Kamil Stoch	(Austria) Stefan Kraft	(Germany) Richard Freitag	
933	8	30 December 2017	(Germany) Oberstdorf (Schattenbergschanze HS137)	L _{664}	(Poland) Kamil Stoch	(Germany) Richard Freitag	(Poland) Dawid Kubacki	(Germany) Richard Freitag	
934	9	1 January 2018	(Germany) Garmisch-Pa (Gr. Olympiaschanze HS140)	L _{665}	(Poland) Kamil Stoch	(Germany) Richard Freitag	(Norway) Anders Fannemel	(Germany) Richard Freitag	
935	10	4 January 2018	(Austria) Innsbruck (Bergiselschanze HS130)	L _{666}	(Poland) Kamil Stoch	(Norway) Daniel-André Tande	(Germany) Andreas Wellinger	(Germany) Richard Freitag	
936	11	6 January 2018	(Austria) Bischofshofen (Paul-Ausserleitner HS140)	L _{667}	(Poland) Kamil Stoch	(Norway) Anders Fannemel	(Germany) Andreas Wellinger	(Poland) Kamil Stoch	
66th Four Hills Tournament Overall (30 December 2017 – 6 January 2018)					(Poland) Kamil Stoch	(Germany) Andreas Wellinger	(Norway) Anders Fannemel	4H Tournament	
937	12	13 January 2018	(Austria) Bad Mitterndorf (Kulm HS235)	F _{116}	(Norway) Andreas Stjernen	(Norway) Daniel-André Tande	(Switzerland) Simon Ammann	(Poland) Kamil Stoch	
		14 January 2018	(Austria) Bad Mitterndorf (Kulm HS235)	F _{cnx}	cancelled due to strong wind			—	
FIS Ski Flying World Championships 2018 (19 – 20 January • (Germany) Oberstdorf)
938	13	28 January 2018	(Poland) Zakopane (Wielka Krokiew HS140)	L _{668}	(Slovenia) Anže Semenič	(Germany) Andreas Wellinger	(Slovenia) Peter Prevc	(Germany) Richard Freitag	
qualifying		2 February 2018	(Germany) Willingen (Mühlenkopfschanze HS145)	L _{Qro}	(Poland) Kamil Stoch	(Germany) Richard Freitag	(Norway) Daniel-André Tande	—	
939	14	3 February 2018	(Germany) Willingen (Mühlenkopfschanze HS145)	L _{669}	(Norway) Daniel-André Tande	(Germany) Richard Freitag	(Poland) Dawid Kubacki	(Germany) Richard Freitag	
940	15	4 February 2018	(Germany) Willingen (Mühlenkopfschanze HS145)	L _{670}	(Norway) Johann André Forfang	(Poland) Kamil Stoch	(Poland) Piotr Żyła	(Poland) Kamil Stoch	
1st Willingen Five Overall (2 – 4 February 2018)					(Poland) Kamil Stoch	(Norway) Johann André Forfang	(Norway) Daniel-André Tande	Willingen Five	
2018 Winter Olympics (10 – 17 February • (South Korea) Pyeongchang)
941	16	4 March 2018	(Finland) Lahti (Salpausselkä HS130)	L _{671}	(Poland) Kamil Stoch	(Germany) Markus Eisenbichler	(Austria) Stefan Kraft	(Poland) Kamil Stoch	
prologue		9 March 2018	(Norway) Oslo (Holmenkollbakken HS134)	L _{Qro}	(Poland) Kamil Stoch	(Norway) Robert Johansson	(Germany) Richard Freitag	—	
team		10 March 2018	(Norway) Oslo (Holmenkollbakken HS134)	L _{T}	(Poland) Kamil Stoch	(Norway) Robert Johansson	(Germany) Andreas Wellinger	—	
942	17	11 March 2018	(Norway) Oslo (Holmenkollbakken HS134)	L _{672}	(Norway) Daniel-André Tande	(Austria) Stefan Kraft	(Austria) Michael Hayböck	(Poland) Kamil Stoch	
prologue		12 March 2018	(Norway) Lillehammer (Lysgårdsbakken HS140)	L _{Qro}	(Poland) Kamil Stoch	(Poland) Dawid Kubacki	(Norway) Robert Johansson	—	
943	18	13 March 2018	(Norway) Lillehammer (Lysgårdsbakken HS140)	L _{673}	(Poland) Kamil Stoch	(Poland) Dawid Kubacki	(Norway) Robert Johansson	(Poland) Kamil Stoch	
prologue		14 March 2018	(Norway) Trondheim (Granåsen HS140)	L _{Qro}	(Poland) Kamil Stoch	(Norway) Andreas Stjernen	(Austria) Stefan Kraft	—	
944	19	15 March 2018	(Norway) Trondheim (Granåsen HS140)	L _{674}	(Poland) Kamil Stoch	(Austria) Stefan Kraft	(Norway) Robert Johansson	(Poland) Kamil Stoch	
prologue		16 March 2018	(Norway) Vikersund (Vikersundbakken HS240)	F _{Qro}	(Poland) Kamil Stoch	(Norway) Robert Johansson	(Norway) Andreas Stjernen	—	
team		17 March 2018	(Norway) Vikersund (Vikersundbakken HS240)	F _{T}	(Austria) Stefan Kraft	(Norway) Robert Johansson	(Norway) Daniel-André Tande	—	
945	20	18 March 2018	(Norway) Vikersund (Vikersundbakken HS240)	F _{117}	(Norway) Robert Johansson	(Norway) Andreas Stjernen	(Norway) Daniel-André Tande	(Poland) Kamil Stoch	
2nd Raw Air Overall (9 – 18 March 2018)					(Poland) Kamil Stoch	(Norway) Robert Johansson	(Norway) Andreas Stjernen	Raw Air	
qualifying		22 March 2018	(Slovenia) Planica (Letalnica b. Gorišek HS240)	F _{Qro}	(Norway) Johann André Forfang	(Slovenia) Anže Semenič	(Poland) Dawid Kubacki	—	
946	21	23 March 2018	(Slovenia) Planica (Letalnica b. Gorišek HS240)	F _{118}	(Poland) Kamil Stoch	(Norway) Johann André Forfang	(Austria) Stefan Kraft	(Poland) Kamil Stoch	
team		24 March 2018	(Slovenia) Planica (Letalnica b. Gorišek HS240)	F _{T}	(Norway) Daniel-André Tande	(Norway) Robert Johansson	(Slovenia) Domen Prevc	—	
947	22	25 March 2018	(Slovenia) Planica (Letalnica b. Gorišek HS240)	F _{119}	(Poland) Kamil Stoch	(Austria) Stefan Kraft	(Norway) Daniel-André Tande	(Poland) Kamil Stoch	
1st Planica7 Overall (22 – 25 March 2018)					(Poland) Kamil Stoch	(Norway) Johann André Forfang	(Norway) Robert Johansson	Planica7	
39th FIS World Cup Men's Overall (19 November 2017 – 25 March 2018)					(Poland) Kamil Stoch	(Germany) Richard Freitag	(Norway) Daniel-André Tande	World Cup Overall	

=== Standings ===
==== Overall ====
Rank	after all 22 events	Points
1	(Poland) Kamil Stoch	1443
2	(Germany) Richard Freitag	1070
3	(Norway) Daniel-André Tande	985
4	(Austria) Stefan Kraft	881
5	(Norway) Robert Johansson	840
6	(Germany) Andreas Wellinger	828
7	(Norway) Johann André Forfang	821
8	(Norway) Andreas Stjernen	665
9	(Poland) Dawid Kubacki	633
10	(Germany) Markus Eisenbichler	597

==== Nations Cup ====
Rank	after all 30 events	Points
1	Norway	7149
2	Germany	5976
3	Poland	5795
4	Austria	3642
5	Slovenia	3223
6	Japan	2659
7	Switzerland	1031
8	Russia	455
9	Finland	119
10	Czech Republic	95

==== Prize money ====
Rank	after all 30 payouts	CHF
1	(Poland) Kamil Stoch	178,800
2	(Norway) Daniel-André Tande	148,000
3	(Norway) Johann André Forfang	135,750
4	(Germany) Richard Freitag	135,500
5	(Norway) Robert Johansson	133,400
6	(Germany) Andreas Wellinger	111,000
7	(Norway) Andreas Stjernen	98,000
8	(Poland) Dawid Kubacki	97,700
9	(Austria) Stefan Kraft	97,350
10	(Germany) Markus Eisenbichler	88,200

==== Ski Flying ====
Rank	after all 4 events	Points
1	(Norway) Andreas Stjernen	257
2	(Norway) Robert Johansson	250
2	(Poland) Kamil Stoch	250
4	(Austria) Stefan Kraft	214
5	(Norway) Daniel-André Tande	200
6	(Norway) Johann André Forfang	142
7	(Germany) Richard Freitag	112
8	(Slovenia) Peter Prevc	106
9	(Japan) Noriaki Kasai	104
10	(Germany) Markus Eisenbichler	102

==== Four Hills Tournament ====
Rank	after all 4 events	Points
1	(Poland) Kamil Stoch	1108.8
2	(Germany) Andreas Wellinger	1039.2
3	(Norway) Anders Fannemel	1021.3
4	(Japan) Junshirō Kobayashi	1021.1
5	(Norway) Robert Johansson	1009.4
6	(Poland) Dawid Kubacki	1003.0
7	(Germany) Markus Eisenbichler	993.8
8	(Norway) Daniel-André Tande	992.3
9	(Norway) Johann Andre Forfang	977.4
10	(Slovenia) Jernej Damjan	974.1

==== Raw Air ====
Rank	after all 10 events	Points
1	(Poland) Kamil Stoch	2590.6
2	(Norway) Robert Johansson	2553.6
3	(Norway) Andreas Stjernen	2508.3
4	(Austria) Stefan Kraft	2480.9
5	(Norway) Daniel-André Tande	2408.3
6	(Norway) Johann André Forfang	2392.8
7	(Germany) Richard Freitag	2333.1
8	(Poland) Dawid Kubacki	2286.4
9	(Germany) Markus Eisenbichler	2194.6
10	(Slovenia) Peter Prevc	2165.9

==== Willingen Five ====
Rank	after all 3 events	Points
1	(Poland) Kamil Stoch	657.8
2	(Norway) Johann André Forfang	650.0
3	(Norway) Daniel-André Tande	633.5
4	(Norway) Robert Johansson	614.2
5	(Germany) Andreas Wellinger	607.1
6	(Poland) Dawid Kubacki	606.9
7	(Poland) Stefan Hula Jr.	605.5
8	(Germany) Markus Eisenbichler	592.4
9	(Poland) Piotr Żyła	590.3
10	(Slovenia) Tilen Bartol	584.9

==== Planica7 ====
Rank	after all 4 events	Points
1	(Poland) Kamil Stoch	1538.2
2	(Norway) Johann André Forfang	1528.8
3	(Norway) Robert Johansson	1512.5
4	(Austria) Stefan Kraft	1477.8
5	(Germany) Richard Freitag	1471.7
6	(Germany) Markus Eisenbichler	1431.8
7	(Japan) Junshirō Kobayashi	1428.8
8	(Norway) Andreas Stjernen	1414.4
9	(Japan) Ryōyū Kobayashi	1413.9
10	(Poland) Stefan Hula Jr.	1382.0

== Women's Individual ==
=== Calendar ===
N – normal hill; L – large hill
All	No.	Date	Place (Hill)	Size	Winner	Second	Third	Overall leader	R.
97	1	1 December 2017	(Norway) Lillehammer (Lysgårdsbakken HS98 / 140)	N _{089}	(Norway) Maren Lundby	(Germany) Katharina Althaus	(Germany) Carina Vogt	(Norway) Maren Lundby	
98	2	2 December 2017	(Norway) Lillehammer (Lysgårdsbakken HS98 / 140)	N _{090}	(Germany) Katharina Althaus	(Norway) Maren Lundby	(Japan) Yūki Itō	(Germany) Katharina Althaus (Norway) Maren Lundby	
99	3	3 December 2017	(Norway) Lillehammer (Lysgårdsbakken HS98 / 140)	L _{009}	(Germany) Katharina Althaus	(Norway) Maren Lundby	(Japan) Sara Takanashi	(Germany) Katharina Althaus	
1st Lillehammer Triple Overall (1 – 3 December 2017)					(Germany) Katharina Althaus	(Norway) Maren Lundby	(Japan) Sara Takanashi	Lillehammer Triple	
100	4	17 December 2017	(Germany) Hinterzarten (Rothaus-Schanze HS108)	N _{091}	(Norway) Maren Lundby	(Germany) Katharina Althaus	(Japan) Sara Takanashi	(Germany) Katharina Althaus (Norway) Maren Lundby	
		6 January 2018	(Romania) Râșnov (Trambulina Valea HS100)	N _{cnx}	cancelled due to lack of snow and warm temperatures (both rescheduled on 3 and 4 March in Râșnov)			—	
		7 January 2018	(Romania) Râșnov (Trambulina Valea HS100)	N _{cnx}	cancelled due to lack of snow and warm temperatures (both rescheduled on 3 and 4 March in Râșnov)			—	
101	5	13 January 2018	(Japan) Sapporo (Miyanomori HS100)	N _{092}	(Norway) Maren Lundby	(Germany) Katharina Althaus	(Japan) Sara Takanashi	(Norway) Maren Lundby	
102	6	14 January 2018	(Japan) Sapporo (Miyanomori HS100)	N _{093}	(Norway) Maren Lundby	(Japan) Sara Takanashi	(Germany) Katharina Althaus	(Norway) Maren Lundby	
103	7	19 January 2018	(Japan) Zaō (Yamagata HS102)	N _{094}	(Norway) Maren Lundby	(Austria) Chiara Hölzl	(Russia) Irina Avvakumova	(Norway) Maren Lundby	
104	8	21 January 2018	(Japan) Zaō (Yamagata HS102)	N _{095}	(Norway) Maren Lundby	(Japan) Yūki Itō	(Japan) Sara Takanashi	(Norway) Maren Lundby	
105	9	27 January 2018	(Slovenia) Ljubno (Savina HS94)	N _{096}	(Norway) Maren Lundby	(Germany) Katharina Althaus	(Japan) Sara Takanashi	(Norway) Maren Lundby	
106	10	28 January 2018	(Slovenia) Ljubno (Savina HS94)	N _{097}	(Austria) D. Iraschko-Stolz	(Norway) Maren Lundby	(Germany) Katharina Althaus	(Norway) Maren Lundby	
		3 February 2018	(Austria) Hinzenbach (Aigner-Schanze HS94)	N _{cnx}	both cancelled and not rescheduled			—	
		4 February 2018	(Austria) Hinzenbach (Aigner-Schanze HS94)	N _{cnx}	both cancelled and not rescheduled			—	
2018 Winter Olympics (12 February • (South Korea) Pyeongchang)
107	11	(Note: Individual cancelled women's event in Râșnov (6 January) was rescheduled on 3 March 2018. It had only one round due to unstable wind.)3 March 2018	(Romania) Râșnov (Trambulina Valea HS97)	N _{098}	(Germany) Katharina Althaus	(Norway) Maren Lundby	(Germany) Carina Vogt	(Norway) Maren Lundby	
108	12	(Note: Individual cancelled women's event in Râșnov (7 January) was rescheduled on 4 March 2018.)4 March 2018	(Romania) Râșnov (Trambulina Valea HS97)	N _{099}	(Norway) Maren Lundby	(Germany) Katharina Althaus	(Slovenia) Nika Križnar	(Norway) Maren Lundby	
109	13	11 March 2018	(Norway) Oslo (Holmenkollbakken HS134)	L _{010}	(Norway) Maren Lundby	(Austria) D. Iraschko-Stolz	(Japan) Yūki Itō	(Norway) Maren Lundby	
110	14	24 March 2018	(Germany) Oberstdorf (Schattenberg HS106)	N _{100}	(Japan) Sara Takanashi	(Austria) D. Iraschko-Stolz	(Norway) Maren Lundby	(Norway) Maren Lundby	
111	15	25 March 2018	(Germany) Oberstdorf (Schattenberg HS106)	N _{101}	(Japan) Sara Takanashi	(Austria) D. Iraschko-Stolz	(Norway) Maren Lundby	(Norway) Maren Lundby	
7th FIS World Cup Women's Overall (1 December 2017 – 25 March 2018)					(Norway) Maren Lundby	(Germany) Katharina Althaus	(Japan) Sara Takanashi	World Cup Overall	

=== Standings ===
==== Overall ====
Rank	after all 15 events	Points
1	(Norway) Maren Lundby	1340
2	(Germany) Katharina Althaus	928
3	(Japan) Sara Takanashi	916
4	(Japan) Yūki Itō	661
5	(Russia) Irina Avvakumova	575
6	(Germany) Carina Vogt	570
7	(Austria) Daniela Iraschko-Stolz	450
8	(Austria) Chiara Hölzl	428
9	(Slovenia) Urša Bogataj	386
10	(Slovenia) Nika Križnar	383

==== Nations Cup ====
Rank	after all 17 events	Points
1	Germany	2952
2	Japan	2947
3	Norway	2037
4	Slovenia	1978
5	Russia	1521
6	Austria	1489
7	France	543
8	Italy	386
9	United States	164
10	China	121

==== Prize money ====
Rank	after all 17 payouts	CHF
1	(Norway) Maren Lundby	40,200
2	(Japan) Sara Takanashi	30,480
3	(Germany) Katharina Althaus	27,840
4	(Japan) Yūki Itō	22,830
5	(Russia) Irina Avvakumova	18,250
6	(Germany) Carina Vogt	16,935
7	(Austria) Daniela Iraschko-Stolz	13,500
8	(Austria) Chiara Hölzl	12,720
9	(Slovenia) Urša Bogataj	12,300
10	(Slovenia) Ema Klinec	11,985

==== Lillehammer Triple ====
Rank	after 3 events	Points
1	(Germany) Katharina Althaus	842.1
2	(Norway) Maren Lundby	823.1
3	(Japan) Sara Takanashi	776.0
4	(Japan) Yūki Itō	744.7
5	(Germany) Carina Vogt	731.1
6	(Russia) Irina Avvakumova	719.2
7	(Germany) Svenja Würth	707.0
8	(Italy) Lara Malsiner	670.4
9	(Slovenia) Urša Bogataj	655.1
10	(Germany) Juliane Seyfarth	660.8

== Team events ==
=== Calendar ===
All	No.	Date	Place (Hill)	Size	Winner	Second	Third	R.
Men's team
88	1	18 November 2017	(Poland) Wisła (Malinka HS134)	L _{067}	Norway Johann André Forfang; Anders Fannemel; Daniel-André Tande; Robert Johansson	Austria Daniel Huber; Clemens Aigner; Michael Hayböck; Stefan Kraft: - - - - - - - - - - - - - - - - - - -; Poland Piotr Żyła; Dawid Kubacki; Maciej Kot; Kamil Stoch		
89	2	25 November 2017	(Finland) Ruka (Rukatunturi HS142)	L _{068}	Norway Robert Johansson; Anders Fannemel; Daniel-André Tande; Johann André Forfang	Germany Markus Eisenbichler; Pius Paschke; Andreas Wellinger; Richard Freitag	Japan Taku Takeuchi; Ryōyū Kobayashi; Noriaki Kasai; Junshirō Kobayashi	
90	3	9 December 2017	(Germany) Titisee-Neustadt (Hochfirstschanze HS142)	L _{069}	Norway Robert Johansson; Daniel-André Tande; Anders Fannemel; Johann André Forfang	Poland Piotr Żyła; Maciej Kot; Dawid Kubacki; Kamil Stoch	Germany Markus Eisenbichler; Karl Geiger; Andreas Wellinger; Richard Freitag	
91	4	27 January 2018	(Poland) Zakopane (Wielka Krokiew HS140)	L _{070}	Poland Maciej Kot; Stefan Hula Jr. Dawid Kubacki; Kamil Stoch	Germany Markus Eisenbichler; Stephan Leyhe; Andreas Wellinger; Richard Freitag	Norway Anders Fannemel; Johann André Forfang; Marius Lindvik; Andreas Stjernen	
92	5	3 March 2018	(Finland) Lahti (Salpausselkä HS130)	L _{071}	Germany Karl Geiger; Markus Eisenbichler; Richard Freitag; Andreas Wellinger	Poland Maciej Kot; Stefan Hula Jr. Dawid Kubacki; Kamil Stoch	Norway Andreas Stjernen; Daniel-André Tande; Johann André Forfang; Robert Johansson	
93	6	10 March 2018	(Norway) Oslo (Holmenkollbakken HS134)	L _{072}	Norway Daniel-André Tande; Andreas Stjernen; Johann André Forfang; Robert Johansson	Poland Maciej Kot; Stefan Hula Jr. Dawid Kubacki; Kamil Stoch	Austria Gregor Schlierenzauer; Clemens Aigner; Michael Hayböck; Stefan Kraft	
94	7	17 March 2018	(Norway) Vikersund (Vikersundbakken HS240)	F _{020}	Norway Daniel-André Tande; Johann André Forfang; Andreas Stjernen; Robert Johansson	Poland Piotr Żyła; Stefan Hula Jr. Dawid Kubacki; Kamil Stoch	Slovenia Domen Prevc; Jernej Damjan; Tilen Bartol; Peter Prevc	
95	8	24 March 2018	(Slovenia) Planica (Letalnica bratov Gorišek HS240)	F _{021}	Norway Daniel-André Tande; Andreas Stjernen; Robert Johansson; Johann André Forfang	Germany Markus Eisenbichler; Stephan Leyhe; Andreas Wellinger; Richard Freitag	Slovenia Domen Prevc; Robert Kranjec; Anže Semenič; Peter Prevc	
Women's team
1	1	16 December 2017	(Germany) Hinterzarten (Rothaus-Schanze HS108)	N _{001}	Japan Yūki Itō; Kaori Iwabuchi; Yūka Setō; Sara Takanashi	Russia Anastasiya Barannikova; Aleksandra Kustova; Sofia Tikhonova; Irina Avvakumova	France Léa Lemare; Julia Clair; Romane Dieu; Lucile Morat	
2	2	20 January 2018	(Japan) Zaō (Yamagata HS102)	N _{002}	Japan Kaori Iwabuchi; Yūka Setō; Yūki Itō; Sara Takanashi	Slovenia Urša Bogataj; Špela Rogelj; Ema Klinec; Nika Križnar	Russia Anastasiya Barannikova; Aleksandra Kustova; Sofia Tikhonova; Irina Avvakumova	

== Qualifications ==
=== Men ===
No.	Place	Qualifications	Competition	Size	Winner
1	(Poland) Wisła	17 November 2017	19 November 2017	L	(Austria) Stefan Kraft
2	(Finland) Ruka	24 November 2017	26 November 2017	L	(Austria) Stefan Kraft
3	(Russia) Nizhny Tagil	1 December 2017	2 December 2017	L	(Germany) Markus Eisenbichler
4	(Russia) Nizhny Tagil	3 December 2017		L	(Norway) Daniel-André Tande
5	(Germany) Titisee-Neustadt	9 December 2017	10 December 2017	L	(Norway) Johann André Forfang
6	(Switzerland) Engelberg	15 December 2017	16 December 2017	L	(Austria) Stefan Kraft
7	(Switzerland) Engelberg	17 December 2017		L	(Poland) Kamil Stoch
8	(Germany) Oberstdorf	29 December 2017	30 December 2017	L	(Germany) Richard Freitag
9	(Germany) Garmisch-Pa	31 December 2017	1 January 2018	L	(Norway) Johann André Forfang
10	(Austria) Innsbruck	3 January 2018	4 January 2018	L	(Japan) Junshirō Kobayashi
11	(Austria) Bischofshofen	5 January 2018	6 January 2018	L	(Poland) Dawid Kubacki
12	(Austria) Bad Mitterndorf	12 January 2018	13 January 2018	F	(Norway) Daniel-André Tande
	(Austria) Bad Mitterndorf	14 January 2018		F	cancelled due to strong wind
13	(Poland) Zakopane	26 January 2018	28 January 2018	L	(Poland) Kamil Stoch
14	(Germany) Willingen	2 February 2018	3 February 2018	L	(Poland) Kamil Stoch
	(Germany) Willingen	4 February 2018		L	canceled after complain; all in
15	(Finland) Lahti	2 March 2018	4 March 2018	L	(Poland) Kamil Stoch
16	(Norway) Oslo	9 March 2018	11 March 2018	L	(Poland) Kamil Stoch
17	(Norway) Lillehammer	12 March 2018	13 March 2018	L	(Poland) Kamil Stoch
18	(Norway) Trondheim	14 March 2018	15 March 2018	L	(Poland) Kamil Stoch
19	(Norway) Vikersund	16 March 2018	18 March 2018	F	(Poland) Kamil Stoch
20	(Slovenia) Planica	22 March 2018	23 March 2018	F	(Norway) Johann André Forfang

=== Women ===
No.	Place	Qualifications	Competition	Size	Winner
1	(Norway) Lillehammer	30 November 2017	1 December 2017	N	(Norway) Maren Lundby
2	(Norway) Lillehammer	2 December 2017		N	(Norway) Maren Lundby
	(Norway) Lillehammer	Top30 allowed	3 December 2017	L	29 competitors applied
3	(Germany) Hinterzarten	15 December 2017	17 December 2017	N	(Germany) Katharina Althaus
4	(Japan) Sapporo	12 January 2018	13 January 2018	N	(Japan) Sara Takanashi
5	(Japan) Sapporo	14 January 2018		N	(Japan) Sara Takanashi
6	(Japan) Zaō	19 January 2018		N	(Norway) Maren Lundby
	(Japan) Zaō	21 January 2018		N	weather conditions
7	(Slovenia) Ljubno	26 January 2018	27 January 2018	N	(Germany) Katharina Althaus
8	(Slovenia) Ljubno	28 January 2018		N	(Germany) Katharina Althaus
9	(Romania) Râșnov	2 March 2018	3 March 2018	N	(Norway) Maren Lundby
10	(Romania) Râșnov	4 March 2018		N	(Germany) Katharina Althaus
	(Norway) Oslo	Top30 allowed	11 March 2018	L	27 competitors applied
11	(Germany) Oberstdorf	23 March 2018	24 March 2018	N	(Norway) Maren Lundby
12	(Germany) Oberstdorf	25 March 2018		N	(Austria) Daniela Iraschko-Stolz

== Participants ==
Overall, a total of 23 countries for both men and ladies participated in this season:

Asia (4)
China; Japan	South Korea; Kazakhstan
Europe (17)
Austria; Bulgaria; Czech Republic; Estonia; Finland; France; Germany; Hungary; Italy	Norway; Poland; Romania; Russia; Slovenia; Ukraine; Switzerland; Turkey
North America (2)
Canada	United States

== Achievements ==
First World Cup career victory

- (Japan) Junshirō Kobayashi (26), in his seventh season – the WC 1 in Wisła
- (Norway) Andreas Stjernen (29), in his ninth season – the WC 12 in Tauplitz/Bad Mitterndorf
- (Slovenia) Anže Semenič (24), in his sixth season – the WC 13 in Zakopane
- (Norway) Robert Johansson (27), in his fifth season – the WC 20 in Vikersund

First World Cup podium

- (Japan) Junshirō Kobayashi (26), in his seventh season – the WC 1 in Wisła
- (Poland) Dawid Kubacki (27), in his eleventh season – the WC 8 in Oberstdorf
- (Slovenia) Anže Semenič (24), in his sixth season – the WC 13 in Zakopane
- (Slovenia) Nika Križnar (17), in her third season – the WC 12 in Râșnov

Number of wins this season (in brackets are all-time wins)

- (Poland) Kamil Stoch – 9 (31)
- (Norway) Maren Lundby – 9 (13)
- (Germany) Richard Freitag – 3 (8)
- (Germany) Katharina Althaus – 3 (4)
- (Japan) Sara Takanashi – 2 (55)
- (Norway) Daniel-André Tande – 2 (5)
- (Austria) Daniela Iraschko-Stolz – 1 (13)
- (Norway) Anders Fannemel – 1 (4)
- (Germany) Andreas Wellinger – 1 (3)
- (Slovenia) Jernej Damjan – 1 (2)
- (Norway) Johann André Forfang – 1 (2)
- (Norway) Robert Johansson – 1 (1)
- (Japan) Junshirō Kobayashi – 1 (1)
- (Slovenia) Anže Semenič – 1 (1)
- (Norway) Andreas Stjernen – 1 (1)

== See also ==
- 2017 Grand Prix (top level summer series)
- 2017–18 FIS Continental Cup (2nd level competition)
