= Daniel-André Tande =

Norwegian ski jumper (born 1994)

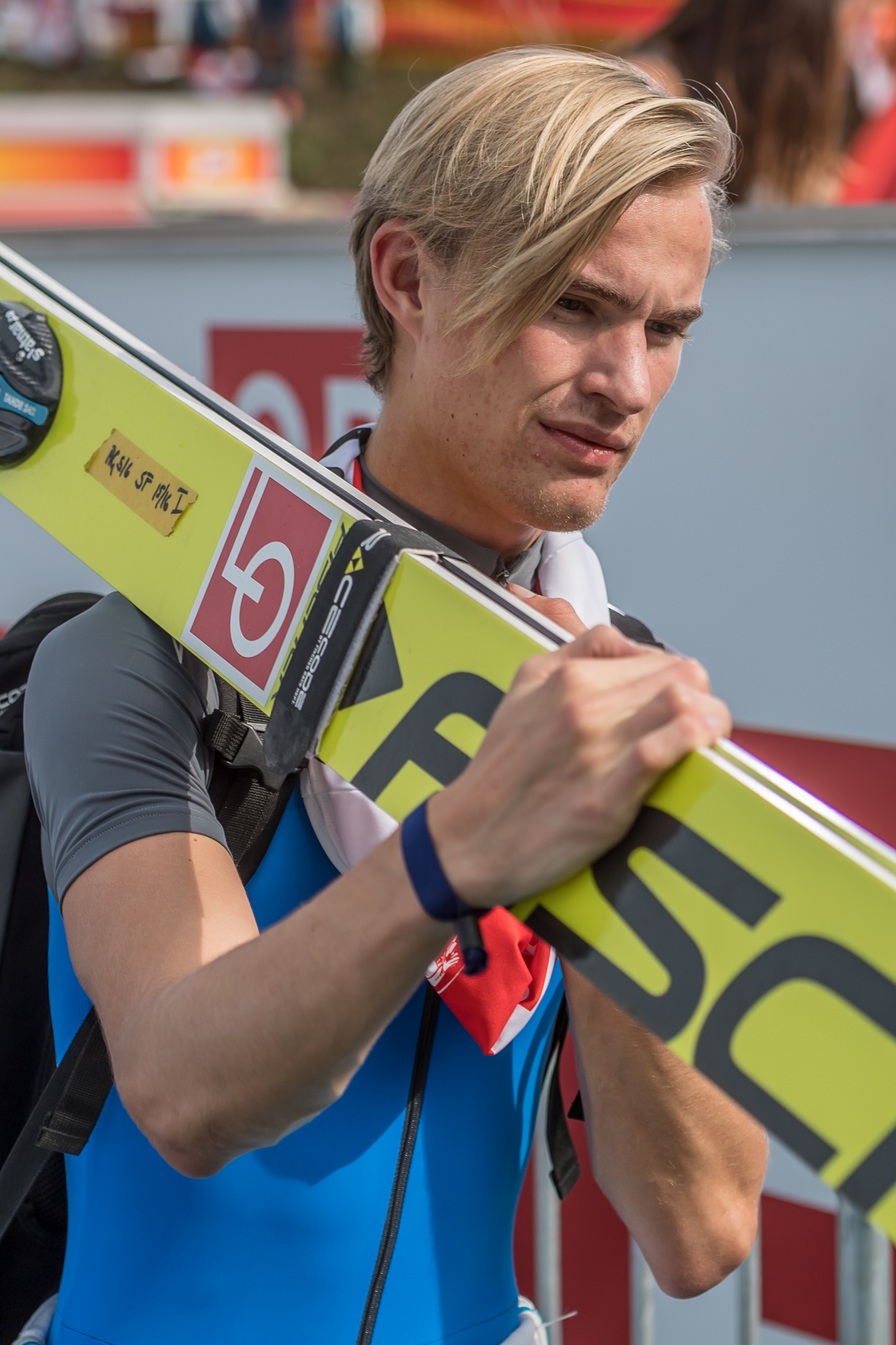
- Tande in Hinzenbach, 2015

Personal information
- Nationality: Norway
- Born: 24 January 1994 (age 32) Narvik, Norway
- Height: 1.82 m (6 ft 0 in)

Sport
- Sport: Skiing
- Club: Kongsberg IF

World Cup career
- Seasons: 2014–2024
- Indiv. starts: 211
- Indiv. podiums: 27
- Indiv. wins: 8
- Team starts: 32
- Team podiums: 20
- Team wins: 13

Achievements and titles
- Personal bests: 243.5 m (799 ft); Planica, 24 March 2018
Medal record
Representing Norway
Men's ski jumping
Olympic Games
Gold medal – first place	2018 Pyeongchang	Team LH
World Championships
Silver medal – second place	2017 Lahti	Team LH
Men's ski flying
World Championships
Gold medal – first place	2016 Bad Mitterndorf	Team
Gold medal – first place	2018 Oberstdorf	Individual
Gold medal – first place	2018 Oberstdorf	Team
Gold medal – first place	2020 Planica	Team
Bronze medal – third place	2022 Vikersund	Team
- Updated on 24 March 2024

Daniel-André Tande (Norwegian pronunciation: [ˈdɑ̀ːnɪjəl ɑnˈdreː ˈtɑ̀ndə]; born 24 January 1994) is a Norwegian former ski jumper, 2018 ski flying World Champion and 2018 team Olympic champion.

== Career ==
Tande's first World Cup start was in Bad Mitterndorf on 11 January 2014. On 25 November 2015, he achieved his first-ever World Cup win in Klingenthal. On 1 January 2017 he won his second World Cup event in Garmisch-Partenkirchen.

On 20 January 2018, Tande achieved the gold medal of the 2018 Ski Flying World Championships. In the three-part competition, he became the ski flying World Champion, beating Kamil Stoch and Richard Freitag. Next day, Tande became a double 2018 Ski Flying World Champion. In team competition Norway, including Tande and his teammates Robert Johansson, Johann Andre Forfang and Andreas Stjernen, defended title of Ski Flying World Champions. The same team is 2018 team Olympic champion.

In March 2021, Tande crashed during a training jump, suffering several injuries and remaining in a medically-induced coma for four days. He recovered and resumed jumping at the 2021 Ski Jumping World Cup.

== World Cup ==
=== Standings ===
Season	Overall	4H	SF	RA	W6	T5	P7
2013/14	64	—	22	N/A	N/A	N/A	N/A
2014/15	45	40	42	N/A	N/A	N/A	N/A
2015/16	7	24	9	N/A	N/A	N/A	N/A
2016/17	3rd place, bronze medalist(s)	3rd place, bronze medalist(s)	11	19	N/A	N/A	N/A
2017/18	3rd place, bronze medalist(s)	8	5	5	3rd place, bronze medalist(s)	N/A	19
2018/19	35	37	16	—	—	N/A	—
2019/20	9	24	14	18	—	10	N/A
2020/21	14	12	—	N/A	2nd place, silver medalist(s)	N/A	—
2021/22	21	27	—	9	N/A	N/A	—
2022/23	18	27	21	10	N/A	N/A	31
2023/24	38	16	—	52	N/A	N/A	—

=== Wins ===
No.	Season	Date	Location	Hill	Size
1	2015/16	22 November 2015	(Germany) Klingenthal	Vogtland Arena HS140	LH
2	2016/17	1 January 2017	(Germany) Garmisch-Pa	Große Olympiaschanze HS140	LH
3	2016/17	4 January 2017	(Austria) Innsbruck	Bergiselschanze HS130	LH
4	2017/18	3 February 2018	(Germany) Willingen	Mühlenkopfschanze HS145 (night)	LH
5	2017/18	11 March 2018	(Norway) Oslo	Holmenkollbakken HS134	LH
6	2019/20	24 November 2019	(Poland) Wisła	Malinka HS134	LH
7	2019/20	30 November 2019	(Finland) Ruka	Rukatunturi HS142 (night)	LH
8	2021/22	6 March 2022	(Norway) Oslo	Holmenkollbakken HS134	LH
