= Junshirō Kobayashi =

Japanese ski jumper (born 1991)

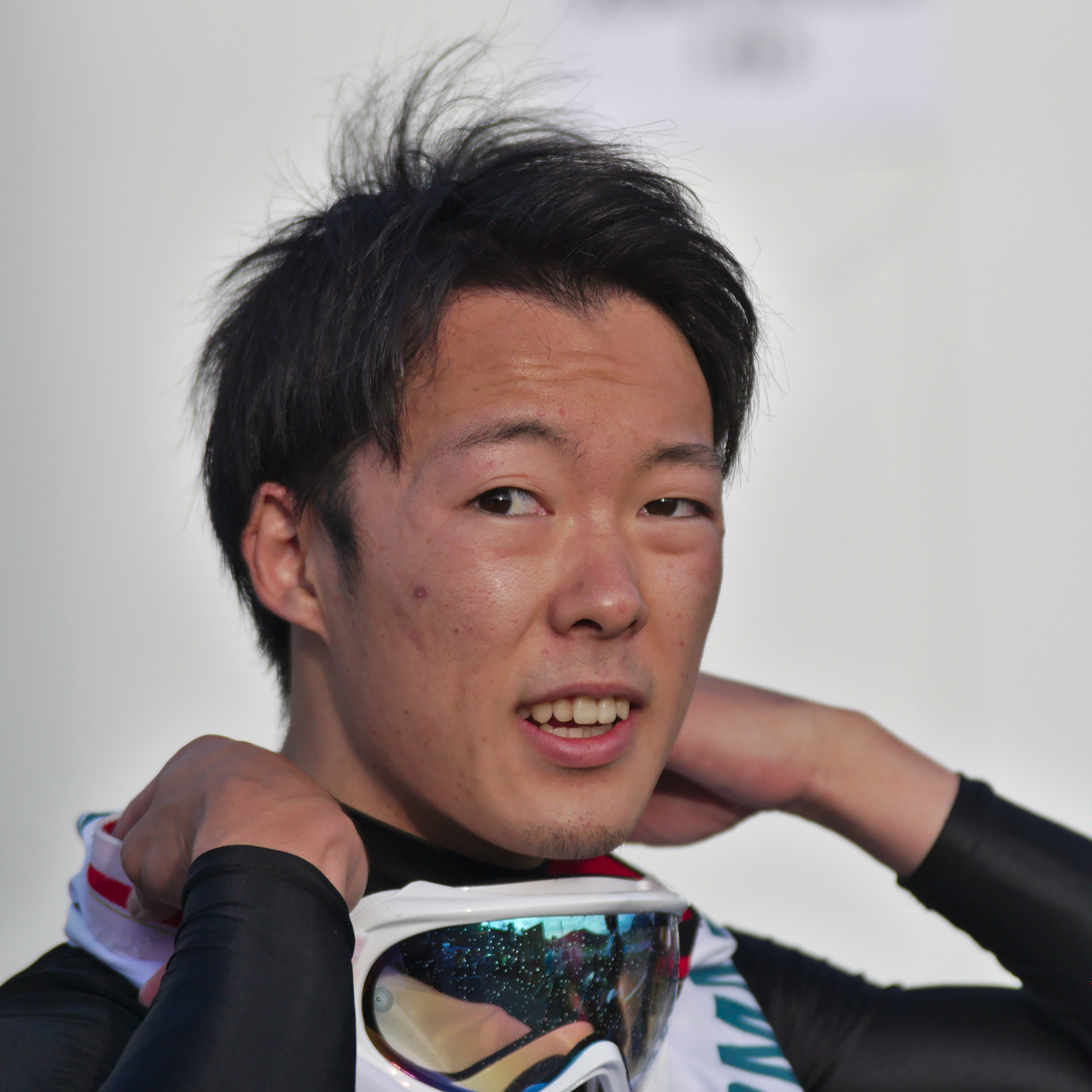
- Kobayashi in 2014

Personal information
- Nationality: Japan
- Born: 11 June 1991 (age 35) Hachimantai, Iwate, Japan
- Height: 1.68 m (5 ft 6 in)

Sport
- Sport: Skiing
- Club: Megmilk Snow Brand; Ski Team

World Cup career
- Seasons: 2012–present
- Indiv. starts: 233
- Indiv. podiums: 1
- Indiv. wins: 1
- Team starts: 38
- Team podiums: 8
- Team wins: 1

Achievements and titles
- Personal bests: 239.5 m (786 ft); Planica, 25 March 2018
Medal record
Men's ski jumping
Representing Japan
World Championships
Bronze medal – third place	2019 Seefeld	Team LH
- Updated on 7 January 2026

Junshirō Kobayashi (小林 潤志郎, Kobayashi Junshirō; born 11 June 1991) is a Japanese ski jumper. He is the older brother of Yūka Kobayashi, Ryōyū Kobayashi and Tatsunao Kobayashi who are also ski jumpers.

== Career ==
He represented Japan at the FIS Nordic World Ski Championships 2015 in Falun, where he finished 13th place on large hill and 25th place on normal hill.

He won three times in Grand Prix competition in Almaty and Hakuba. He finished in 3rd place overall in the 2017 FIS Ski Jumping Grand Prix season.

On 19 November 2017, he claimed his first World Cup win in Wisła and became the thirteenth Japanese ski jumper with at least one World Cup win.

== Major tournament results ==
=== Olympics ===
Year	Place	NH	LH	Team LH
2018	(South Korea) Pyeongchang	31	24	—

=== FIS World Nordic Ski Championships ===
Year	Place	NH	LH	Team LH	Mixed NH
2015	(Sweden) Falun	25	13	4	—
2017	Not qualified				
2019	(Austria) Seefeld	17	17	3rd place, bronze medalist(s)	—
2021	(Germany) Oberstdorf	29	32	—	—

=== Ski Flying World Championships ===
Year	Place	Individual	Team
2018	(Germany) Oberstdorf	29	—

== World Cup results ==
=== Standings ===
Season	Overall	4H	SF	RA	W6	T5	P7
2011/12	52	64	—	N/A	N/A	N/A	N/A
2012/13	60	—	—	N/A	N/A	N/A	N/A
2013/14	—	—	—	N/A	N/A	N/A	N/A
2014/15	44	38	31	N/A	N/A	N/A	N/A
2015/16	61	54	—	N/A	N/A	N/A	N/A
2016/17	54	—	—	54	N/A	N/A	N/A
2017/18	11	4	14	16	—	N/A	7
2018/19	19	25	23	19	16	N/A	13
2019/20	30	29	20	20	16	22	N/A
2020/21	33	18	30	N/A	—	N/A	31
2021/22	32	17	43	30	N/A	N/A	42
2022/23	63	55	—	39	N/A	N/A	37
2023/24	34	29	32	22	N/A	N/A	20
2024/25	–	–	–	–	N/A	N/A	–

=== Individual wins ===
No.	Season	Date	Location	Hill	Size
1	2017/18	19 November 2017	(Poland) Wisła	Malinka HS134	LH

=== Individual starts (233) ===
winner (1); second (2); third (3); did not compete (–); failed to qualify (q); disqualified (DQ)
Season	1	2	3	4	5	6	7	8	9	10	11	12	13	14	15	16	17	18	19	20	21	22	23	24	25	26	27	28	29	30	31	32	Points
2011/12	Kuusamo	Lillehammer	Lillehammer	Harrachov	Harrachov	Engelberg	Engelberg	Oberstdorf	Garmisch-Partenkirchen	Innsbruck	Bischofshofen	Bad Mitterndorf	Bad Mitterndorf	Zakopane	Zakopane	Sapporo	Sapporo	Predazzo	Predazzo	Willingen	Oberstdorf	Lahti	Trondheim	Oslo	Planica	Planica							40
2011/12	24	q	29	27	28	22	48	38	DQ	42	16	–	–	–	–	41	32	49	q	q	34	–	–	–	–	–							40
2012/13	Lillehammer	Lillehammer	Kuusamo	Krasnaja Polana	Krasnaja Polana	Engelberg	Engelberg	Oberstdorf	Garmisch-Partenkirchen	Innsbruck	Bischofshofen	Wisła	Zakopane	Sapporo	Sapporo	Vikersund	Vikersund	Harrachov	Harrachov	Klingenthal	Oberstdorf	Lahti	Kuopio	Trondheim	Oslo	Planica	Planica						17
2012/13	45	–	27	q	–	39	–	–	–	–	–	–	–	25	35	–	–	–	–	46	31	31	33	28	30	q	–						17
2013/14	Klingenthal	Kuusamo	Lillehammer	Lillehammer	Titisee-Neustadt	Titisee-Neustadt	Engelberg	Engelberg	Oberstdorf	Garmisch-Partenkirchen	Innsbruck	Bischofshofen	Tauplitz	Tauplitz	Wisła	Zakopane	Sapporo	Sapporo	Willingen	Willingen	Falun	Lahti	Lahti	Kuopio	Trondheim	Oslo	Planica	Planica					0
2013/14	–	–	–	–	–	–	–	–	–	–	–	–	–	–	–	–	34	64	–	–	–	–	–	–	–	–	–	–					0
2014/15	Klingenthal	Kuusamo	Kuusamo	Lillehammer	Lillehammer	Nizhny Tagil	Nizhny Tagil	Engelberg	Engelberg	Oberstdorf	Garmisch-Partenkirchen	Innsbruck	Bischofshofen	Tauplitz	Wisła	Zakopane	Sapporo	Sapporo	Willingen	Willingen	Titisee-Neustadt	Titisee-Neustadt	Vikersund	Vikersund	Lahti	Kuopio	Trondheim	Oslo	Oslo	Planica	Planica		95
2014/15	q	38	36	28	21	–	–	–	–	41	29	41	47	18	q	33	–	–	–	–	23	17	q	24	31	32	13	19	39	25	–		95
2015/16	Klingenthal	Lillehammer	Lillehammer	Nizhny Tagil	Nizhny Tagil	Engelberg	Engelberg	Oberstdorf	Garmisch-Partenkirchen	Innsbruck	Bischofshofen	Willingen	Zakopane	Sapporo	Sapporo	Trondheim	Vikersund	Vikersund	Vikersund	Lahti	Lahti	Kuopio	Almaty	Almaty	Wisła	Titisee-Neustadt	Planica	Planica	Planica				13
2015/16	q	40	45	–	–	44	48	45	q	36	q	–	–	28	21	–	–	–	–	–	–	–	–	–	–	–	–						13
2016/17	Kuusamo	Kuusamo	Klingenthal	Lillehammer	Lillehammer	Engelberg	Engelberg	Oberstdorf	Garmisch-Partenkirchen	Innsbruck	Bischofshofen	Wisła	Wisła	Zakopane	Willingen	Oberstdorf	Oberstdorf	Sapporo	Sapporo	Pyeongchang	Pyeongchang	Oslo	Trondheim	Vikersund	Planica	Planica							20
2016/17	–	–	–	–	–	–	–	–	–	–	–	–	–	–	q	39	33	25	17	33	41	45	39	q	q	–							20
2017/18	Wisła	Kuusamo	Nizhny Tagil	Nizhny Tagil	Titisee-Neustadt	Engelberg	Engelberg	Oberstdorf	Garmisch-Partenkirchen	Innsbruck	Bischofshofen	Tauplitz	Zakopane	Willingen	Willingen	Lahti	Oslo	Lillehammer	Trondheim	Vikersund	Planica	Planica											568
2017/18	1	10	–	–	4	7	8	6	4	6	7	31	11	–	–	7	34	17	17	23	7	10											568
2018/19	Wisła	Kuusamo	Kuusamo	Nizhny Tagil	Nizhny Tagil	Engelberg	Engelberg	Oberstdorf	Garmisch-Partenkirchen	Innsbruck	Bischofshofen	Val di Fiemme	Val di Fiemme	Zakopane	Sapporo	Sapporo	Oberstdorf	Oberstdorf	Oberstdorf	Lahti	Willingen	Willingen	Oslo	Lillehammer	Trondheim	Vikersund	Planica	Planica					335
2018/19	19	17	18	30	19	22	20	50	5	26	29	21	28	37	19	22	21	27	24	21	12	18	11	6	20	33	13	15					335
2019/20	Wisła	Kuusamo	Nizhny Tagil	Nizhny Tagil	Klingenthal	Engelberg	Engelberg	Oberstdorf	Garmisch-Partenkirchen	Innsbruck	Bischofshofen	Val di Fiemme	Val di Fiemme	Titisee-Neustadt	Titisee-Neustadt	Zakopane	Sapporo	Sapporo	Willingen	Tauplitz	Tauplitz	Râșnov	Râșnov	Lahti	Lahti	Oslo	Lillehammer						162
2019/20	10	17	26	29	36	–	–	23	DQ	22	29	35	21	28	23	46	42	20	12	21	19	–	–	DQ	22	27	24						162
2020/21	Wisła	Ruka	Ruka	Nizhny Tagil	Nizhny Tagil	Engelberg	Engelberg	Oberstdorf	Garmisch-Partenkirchen	Innsbruck	Bischofshofen	Titisee-Neustadt	Titisee-Neustadt	Zakopane	Lahti	Willingen	Willingen	Klingenthal	Klingenthal	Szczyrk	Szczyrk	Râșnov	Planica	Planica	Planica								113
2020/21	15	17	27	36	28	19	37	28	17	34	17	33	23	18	31	–	–	–	–	–	–	–	20	30	–								113
2021/22	Nizhny Tagil	Nizhny Tagil	Ruka	Ruka	Wisła	Klingenthal	Klingenthal	Engelberg	Engelberg	Oberstdorf	Garmisch-Partenkirchen	Bischofshofen	Bischofshofen	Bischofshofen	Zakopane	Titisee-Neustadt	Titisee-Neustadt	Willingen	Willingen	Lahti	Lahti	Lillehammer	Oslo	Oslo	Oberstdorf	Oberstdorf	Planica	Planica					179
2021/22	11	42	44	15	15	33	9	31	23	11	44	19	14	37	45	32	34	20	27	22	33	25	38	34	q	34	q	29					179
2022/23	Wisła	Wisła	Ruka	Ruka	Titisee-Neustadt	Titisee-Neustadt	Engelberg	Engelberg	Oberstdorf	Garmisch-Partenkirchen	Innsbruck	Bischofshofen	Zakopane	Sapporo	Sapporo	Sapporo	Bad Mitterndorf	Bad Mitterndorf	Willingen	Willingen	Lake Placid, New York	Lake Placid, New York	Râșnov	Oslo	Oslo	Lillehammer	Lillehammer	Vikersund	Vikersund	Lahti	Planica	Planica	14
2022/23	19	q	39	36	q	48	32	38	50	q	34	q	–	q	40	29	–	–	–	–	–	–	–	47	45	38	47	q	38	32	q	–	14
2023/24	Ruka	Ruka	Lillehammer	Lillehammer	Klingenthal	Klingenthal	Engelberg	Engelberg	Oberstdorf	Garmisch-Partenkirchen	Innsbruck	Bischofshofen	Wisła	Zakopane	Willingen	Willingen	Lake Placid, New York	Lake Placid, New York	Sapporo	Sapporo	Oberstdorf	Oberstdorf	Lahti	Lahti	Oslo	Oslo	Trondheim	Trondheim	Vikersund	Vikersund	Planica	Planica	143
2023/24	47	45	21	48	25	20	25	28	29	42	30	37	26	24	42	q	40	17	10	32	–	–	26	32	21	40	30	23	35	20	22	23	143
2024/25	Lillehammer	Lillehammer	Ruka	Ruka	Wisła	Wisła	Titisee-Neustadt	Titisee-Neustadt	Engelberg	Engelberg	Oberstdorf	Garmisch-Partenkirchen	Innsbruck	Bischofshofen	Zakopane	Oberstdorf	Oberstdorf	Willingen	Willingen	Lake Placid	Lake Placid	Sapporo	Sapporo	Oslo	Vikersund	Vikersund	Lahti	Planica	Planica				0
2024/25	39	50	40	q	45	48	q	44	37	38	–	–	–	–	38	q	38	–	–	–	–	31	34	–	–	–	–	–	–				0
2025/26	Lillehammer	Lillehammer	Falun	Falun	Ruka	Wisła	Wisła	Klingenthal	Klingenthal	Engelberg	Engelberg	Oberstdorf	Garmisch-Partenkirchen	Innsbruck	Bischofshofen	Zakopane	Sapporo	Sapporo	Willingen	Willingen	Bad Mitterndorf	Bad Mitterndorf	Lahti	Oslo	Oslo	Vikersund	Vikersund	Planica	Planica				0
2025/26	–	–	–	–	–	–	–	–	–	–	–	41	–	46	q																		0
