= Andreas Stjernen =

Norwegian retired ski jumper (born 1988)

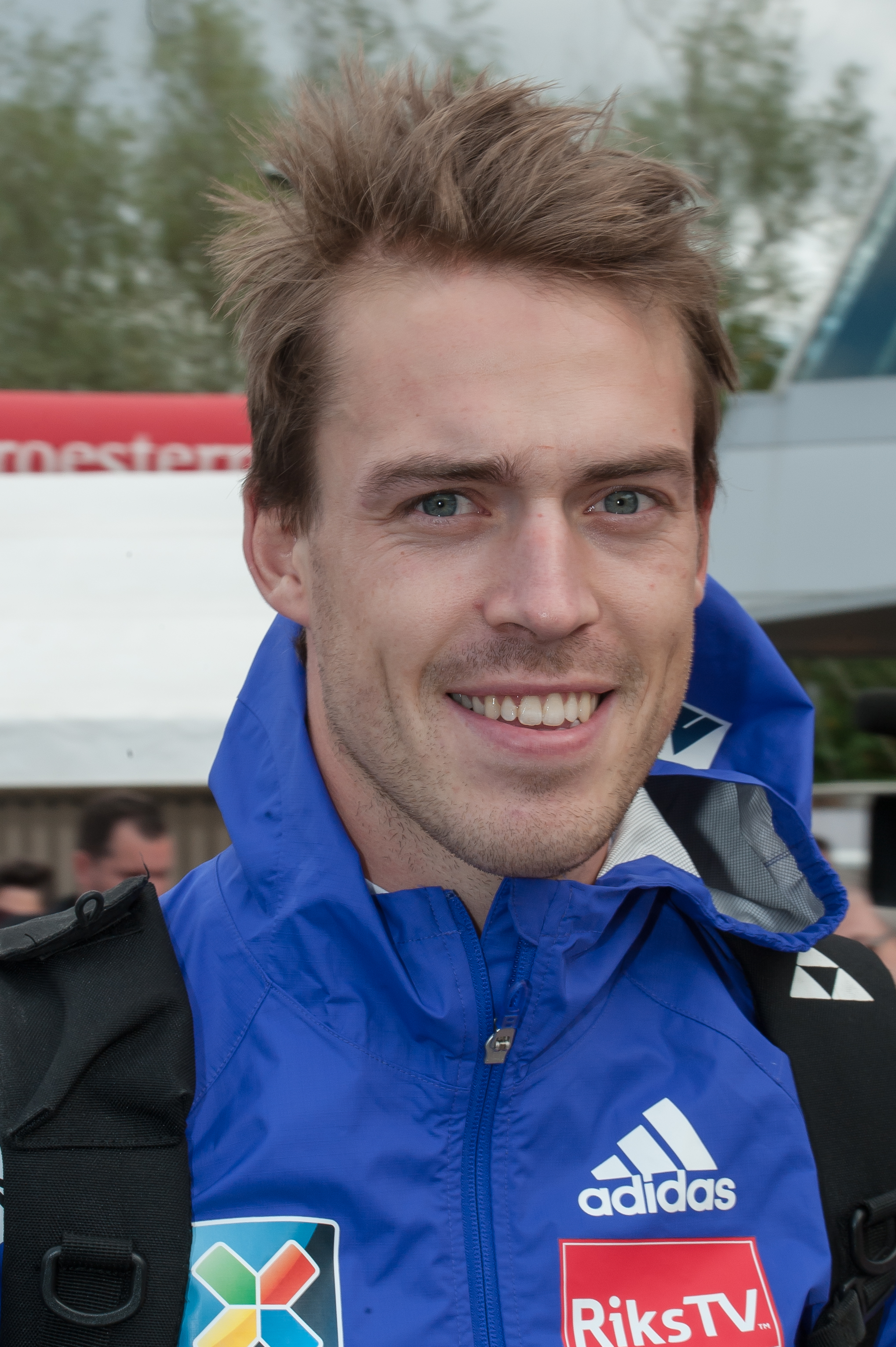
- Stjernen in Hinzenbach, 2015

Personal information
- Full name: Andreas Kolset Stjernen
- Nationality: Norway
- Born: 30 July 1988 (age 37) Levanger Municipality, Norway
- Height: 1.89 m (6 ft 2 in)

Sport
- Sport: Skiing
- Club: Sprova IL

World Cup career
- Seasons: 2009–2019
- Indiv. starts: 167
- Indiv. podiums: 7
- Indiv. wins: 1
- Team starts: 20
- Team podiums: 14
- Team wins: 7

Achievements and titles
- Personal bests: 249 m (817 ft); Vikersund, 14 February 2016
Medal record
Representing Norway
Men's ski jumping
Winter Olympic Games
Gold medal – first place	2018 Pyeongchang	Team LH
World Championships
Silver medal – second place	2017 Lahti	Team LH
Bronze medal – third place	2019 Seefeld	Mixed team NH
Men's ski flying
World Championships
Gold medal – first place	2018 Oberstdorf	Team
- Updated on 24 March 2019

Andreas Kolset Stjernen (born 30 July 1988) is a Norwegian retired ski jumper. He is the son of former ski jumper Hroar Stjernen.

== Career ==
He made his debut in the Continental Cup in February 2005 in Brotterode, scoring two 49th places over two days. His first time among the top thirty occurred in March 2006 in Bischofshofen when he finished 28th, and his first time among the top ten occurred in March 2009 in Trondheim when he finished eighth. He made his World Cup debut in December 2009 in Lillehammer and collected his first World Cup points by finishing 19th. His personal best is 249 meters set in Vikersund on 14 February 2016. Stjernen won the 2017–18 FIS Ski Flying World Cup, becoming the first Norwegian to achieve this feat.

He represented the sports club Sprova IL and Trønderhopp, and lives in Levanger Municipality.

== World Cup ==
=== Standings ===
Season	Overall	4H	SF	RA	W5	P7	NT
2009/10	56	41	—	N/A	N/A	N/A	54
2010/11	48	—	42	N/A	N/A	N/A	N/A
2011/12	37	—	48	N/A	N/A	N/A	N/A
2012/13	19	43	3rd place, bronze medalist(s)	N/A	N/A	N/A	N/A
2013/14	43	—	—	N/A	N/A	N/A	N/A
2014/15	36	—	11	N/A	N/A	N/A	N/A
2015/16	12	15	10	N/A	N/A	N/A	N/A
2016/17	12	10	14	4	N/A	N/A	N/A
2017/18	8	19	1st place, gold medalist(s)	3rd place, bronze medalist(s)	22	8	N/A
2018/19	19	7	27	38	—	—	N/A

=== Individual wins ===
No.	Season	Date	Location	Hill	Size
1	2017/18	13 January 2018	(Austria) Tauplitz/Bad Mitterndorf	Kulm HS235	FH
