= Tilen Bartol =

Slovenian ski jumper

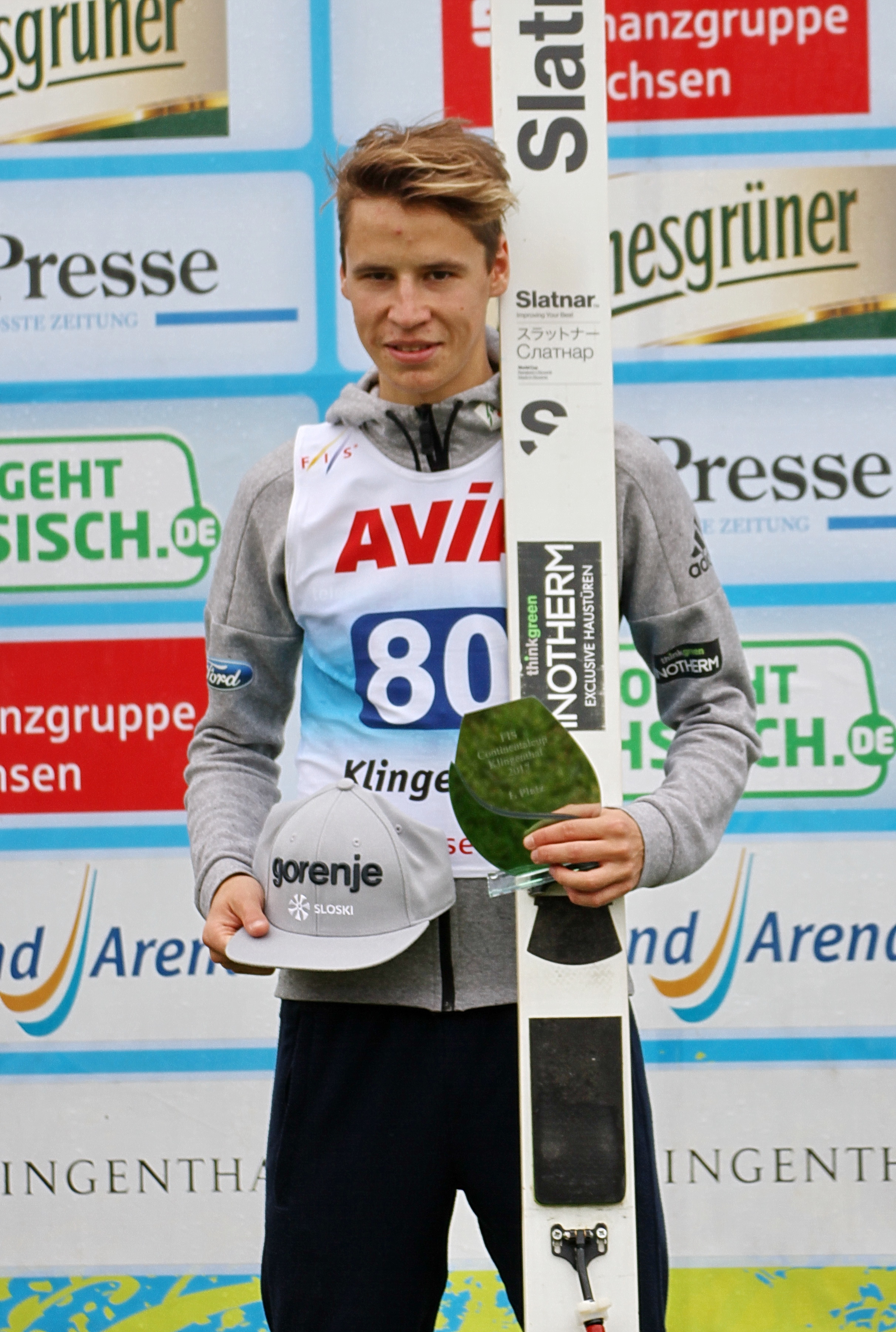
- Bartol in 2017

Personal information
- Born: 17 April 1997 (age 29) Kranj, Slovenia
- Height: 1.77 m (5 ft 10 in)

Sport
- Sport: Ski jumping

World Cup career
- Seasons: 2016–2023
- Indiv. starts: 60
- Team starts: 7
- Team podiums: 1

Achievements and titles
- Personal bests: 247.5 m (812 ft); Planica, 25 March 2018

Tilen Bartol (born 17 April 1997) is a retired Slovenian ski jumper.

== Career ==
Bartol made his World Cup debut on 29 December 2015 at the Four Hills Tournament in Oberstdorf, where he finished 47th.

On 16 March 2016, he fell at Planica ski flying hill test event at 252 metres (827 ft). The distance would be a world record without falling.

== World Cup results ==
=== Standings ===
Season	Overall	4H	SF	RA
2015–16	—	60	—	N/A
2016–17	—	—	—	62
2017–18	25	28	19	14
2018–19	61	—	40	—
2019–20	69	62	—	—
2020–21	47	61	37	N/A
2021–22	—	—	—	—
2022–23	—	—	—	—

=== Individual starts ===
winner (1); second (2); third (3); did not compete (–); failed to qualify (q); disqualified (DQ)
Season	1	2	3	4	5	6	7	8	9	10	11	12	13	14	15	16	17	18	19	20	21	22	23	24	25	26	27	28	29	30	31	32	Points
2015–16	Klingenthal	Lillehammer	Lillehammer	Nizhny Tagil	Nizhny Tagil	Engelberg	Engelberg	Oberstdorf	Garmisch-Partenkirchen	Innsbruck	Bischofshofen	Willingen	Zakopane	Sapporo	Sapporo	Trondheim	Vikersund	Vikersund	Vikersund	Lahti	Lahti	Kuopio	Almaty	Almaty	Wisła	Titisee-Neustadt	Planica	Planica	Planica				0
2015–16	–	–	–	–	–	–	–	47	q	49	q	–	–	–	–	–	–	–	–	–	–	–	–	–	–	–	–	–	–				0
2016–17	Kuusamo	Kuusamo	Klingenthal	Lillehammer	Lillehammer	Engelberg	Engelberg	Oberstdorf	Garmisch-Partenkirchen	Innsbruck	Bischofshofen	Wisła	Wisła	Zakopane	Willingen	Oberstdorf	Oberstdorf	Sapporo	Sapporo	Pyeongchang	Pyeongchang	Oslo	Trondheim	Vikersund	Planica	Planica							0
2016–17	–	–	–	–	–	–	–	–	–	–	–	–	–	–	–	–	–	–	–	–	–	31	–	–	38	–							0
2017–18	Wisła	Kuusamo	Nizhny Tagil	Nizhny Tagil	Titisee-Neustadt	Engelberg	Engelberg	Oberstdorf	Garmisch-Partenkirchen	Innsbruck	Bischofshofen	Tauplitz	Zakopane	Willingen	Willingen	Lahti	Oslo	Lillehammer	Trondheim	Vikersund	Planica	Planica											185
2017–18	21	29	35	25	36	36	21	16	5	36	q	18	–	10	17	30	28	24	33	13	q	18											185
2018–19	Wisła	Kuusamo	Kuusamo	Nizhny Tagil	Nizhny Tagil	Engelberg	Engelberg	Oberstdorf	Garmisch-Partenkirchen	Innsbruck	Bischofshofen	Val di Fiemme	Val di Fiemme	Zakopane	Sapporo	Sapporo	Oberstdorf	Oberstdorf	Oberstdorf	Lahti	Willingen	Willingen	Oslo	Lillehammer	Trondheim	Vikersund	Planica	Planica					9
2018–19	–	–	–	–	–	–	–	–	–	–	–	39	42	44	q	29	q	24	32	–	–	–	–	–	–	–	31	–					9
2019–20	Wisła	Kuusamo	Nizhny Tagil	Nizhny Tagil	Klingenthal	Engelberg	Engelberg	Oberstdorf	Garmisch-Partenkirchen	Innsbruck	Bischofshofen	Val di Fiemme	Val di Fiemme	Titisee-Neustadt	Titisee-Neustadt	Zakopane	Sapporo	Sapporo	Willingen	Tauplitz	Tauplitz	Râșnov	Râșnov	Lahti	Lahti	Oslo	Lillehammer						3
2019–20	29	q	38	43	q	DQ	30	49	q	–	–	–	–	–	–	–	–	–	–	–	–	–	–	–	–	–	–						3
2020–21	Wisła	Ruka	Ruka	Nizhny Tagil	Nizhny Tagil	Engelberg	Engelberg	Oberstdorf	Garmisch-Partenkirchen	Innsbruck	Bischofshofen	Titisee-Neustadt	Titisee-Neustadt	Zakopane	Lahti	Willingen	Willingen	Klingenthal	Klingenthal	Szczyrk	Szczyrk	Râșnov	Planica	Planica	Planica								58
2020–21	39	33	32	q	24	21	43	–	–	–	31	34	37	12	40	43	29	47	26	31	34	25	25	47	–								58
2021–22	Nizhny Tagil	Nizhny Tagil	Ruka	Ruka	Wisła	Klingenthal	Klingenthal	Engelberg	Engelberg	Oberstdorf	Garmisch-Partenkirchen	Bischofshofen	Bischofshofen	Bischofshofen	Zakopane	Titisee-Neustadt	Titisee-Neustadt	Willingen	Willingen	Lahti	Lahti	Lillehammer	Oslo	Oslo	Oberstdorf	Oberstdorf	Planica	Planica					0
2021–22	42	43	q	46	–	–	–	–	–	–	–	–	–	–	–	–	–	–	–	–	–	–	–	–	–	–	33	–					0
2022–23	Wisła	Wisła	Kuusamo	Kuusamo	Titisee-Neustadt	Titisee-Neustadt	Engelberg	Engelberg	Oberstdorf	Garmisch-Partenkirchen	Innsbruck	Bischofshofen	Zakopane	Sapporo	Sapporo	Sapporo	Tauplitz	Tauplitz	Willingen	Willingen	Lake Placid	Lake Placid	Râșnov	Oslo	Oslo	Lillehammer	Lillehammer	Vikersund	Vikersund	Lahti	Planica	Planica	0
2022–23	–	–	–	–	–	–	–	–	–	–	–	–	–	–	–	–	–	–	–	–	–	–	–	–	–	–	–	–	–	–	q	–	0
