= Anders Fannemel =

Norwegian ski jumper

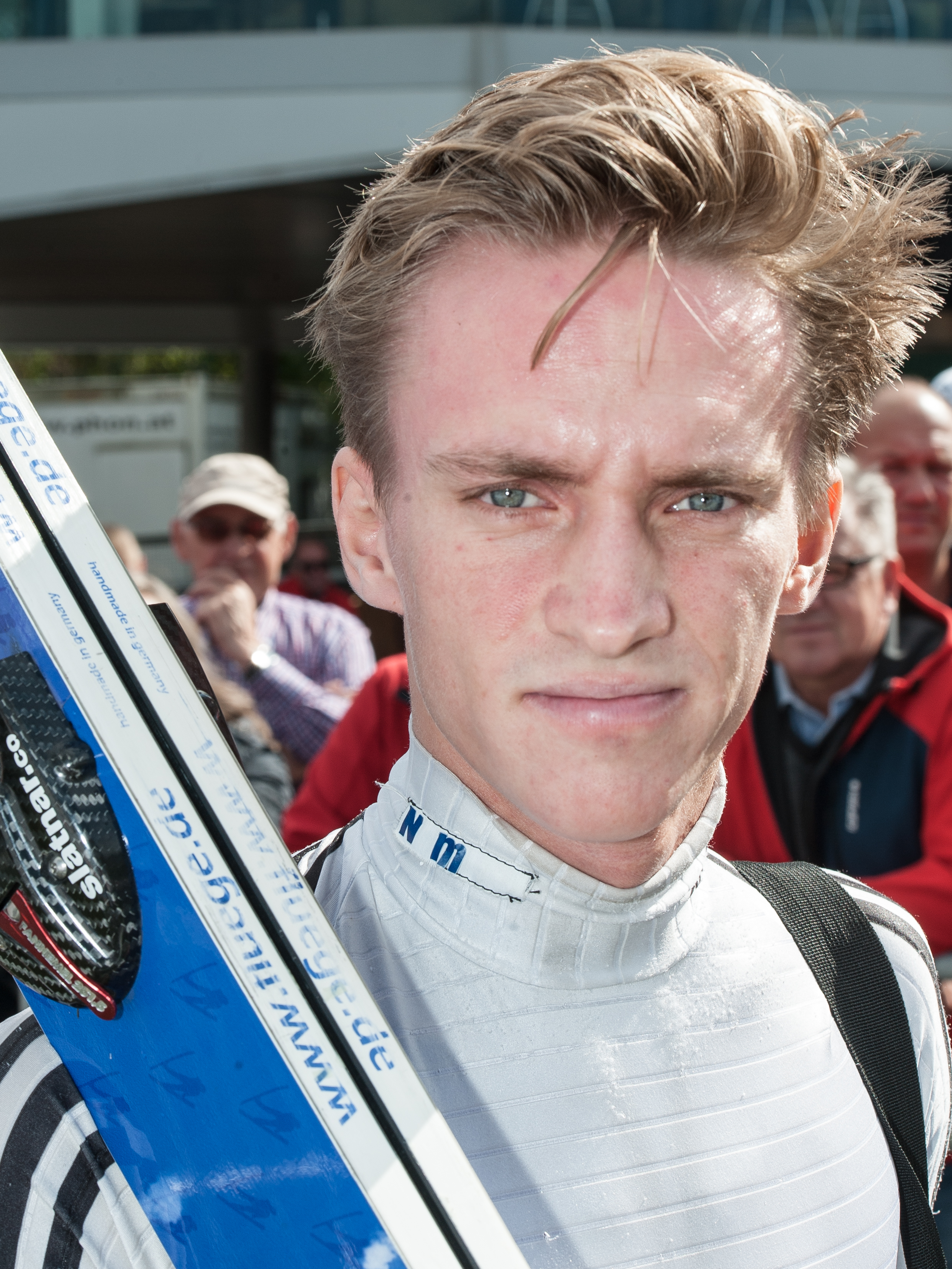
- Fannemel in Hinzenbach, 2015

Personal information
- Nationality: Norway
- Born: 13 May 1991 (age 35) Hornindal Municipality, Norway
- Height: 1.69 m (5 ft 7 in)

Sport
- Sport: Skiing
- Club: Hornindal IL

World Cup career
- Seasons: 2010; 2012–2023
- Indiv. starts: 176
- Indiv. podiums: 12
- Indiv. wins: 4
- Team starts: 29
- Team podiums: 17
- Team wins: 4

Achievements and titles
- Personal bests: 251.5 m (825 ft); Vikersund, 15 February 2015
Medal record
Representing Norway
Men's ski jumping
Ski Jumping World Championships
Gold medal – first place	2015 Falun	Team LH
Silver medal – second place	2017 Lahti	Team LH
Men's ski flying
Ski Flying World Championships
Gold medal – first place	2016 Bad Mitterndorf	Team
- Updated on 25 March 2023

Anders Fannemel (Norwegian pronunciation: [ˈɑ̂nːəʂ ˈfɑ̂nːəmeːl]; born 13 May 1991) is a Norwegian former ski jumper. He held the ski flying world record from 2015 to 2017, with a jump of 251.5 m (825 ft) set in Vikersund.

== Career ==
Fannemel started ski jumping when he was 14 years old, which is rather late compared to other elite ski jumpers. He made his debut in the Continental Cup in September 2008 in Lillehammer, scoring two seventh places over two days. He finished in lower positions throughout the rest of the 2008/09 season, but in the 2009/10 season he recorded a fifth and a first place in the Continental Cup, again in Lillehammer, in August 2009.

He made his World Cup debut in December 2009, again in Lillehammer, and collected his first World Cup points by finishing tenth. He has two world cup wins and another five podiums. In 2015 season he was the first time in his career World Cup overall leader.

He held the world record for the world's longest ski jump at 251.5 meters (825 feet), which he jumped in Vikersund, Norway on 15 February 2015, beating Peter Prevc's record that was set the day before by 1.5 meters.

He represents the sports club Hornindal IL and lives in Hornindal Municipality (part of Volda Municipality since 2020).

== World Cup ==
=== Standings ===
Season	Overall	4H	SF	RA	W6	P7	NT
2009/10	60	—	—	N/A	N/A	N/A	—
2011/12	25	—	16	N/A	N/A	N/A	N/A
2012/13	26	18	21	N/A	N/A	N/A	N/A
2013/14	23	31	10	N/A	N/A	N/A	N/A
2014/15	4	11	6	N/A	N/A	N/A	N/A
2015/16	10	8	11	N/A	N/A	N/A	N/A
2016/17	26	28	16	34	N/A	N/A	N/A
2017/18	12	3rd place, bronze medalist(s)	12	32	12	18	N/A
2018/19	36	27	35	36	41	55	N/A
2021/22	71	—	—	—	N/A	—	N/A
2022/23	78	34	—	64	N/A	—	N/A

=== Wins ===
No.	Season	Date	Location	Hill	Size
1	2014/15	13 December 2014	(Russia) Nizhny Tagil	Tramplin Stork HS134 (night)	LH
2	2014/15	8 February 2015	(Germany) Titisee-Neustadt	Hochfirstschanze HS142	LH
3	2015/16	31 January 2016	(Japan) Sapporo	Ōkurayama HS134	LH
4	2017/18	16 December 2017	(Switzerland) Engelberg	Gross-Titlis-Schanze HS140 (night)	LH

== Ski jumping world record ==
Date	Hill	Location	Metres	Feet
15 February 2015	Vikersundbakken HS225	Vikersund, Norway	251.5	825

Records
Preceded by Peter Prevc; 250 m (820 ft)	World's longest ski jump 251.5 m (825 ft); 15 February 2015 – 18 March 2017	Succeeded by Robert Johansson; 252 m (827 ft)
