= 2014–15 FIS Ski Flying World Cup =

FIS Ski Flying World Cup 2014/15
Winners
- Overall: (Slovenia) Peter Prevc
- Nations Cup (unofficial): Slovenia

Competitions
- Venues: 3
- Individual: 5
- Team: 1
- Cancelled: 1

The 2014/15 FIS Ski Flying World Cup was the 18th official World Cup season in ski flying awarded with small crystal globe as the subdiscipline of FIS Ski Jumping World Cup.

== Map of World Cup hosts ==
(Austria) Bad Mitterndorf	(Norway) Vikersund	(Slovenia) Planica
Kulm	Vikersundbakken	Letalnica bratov Gorišek
Europe

== World records ==
List of world record distances (both official and invalid) achieved within this World Cup season.

Date	Athlete	Hill	Round	Place	Metres	Feet
14 February 2015	(Slovenia) Peter Prevc	Vikersundbakken HS225	Final	Vikersund, Norway	250	820
15 February 2015	(Russia) Dmitri Vassiliev	Vikersundbakken HS225	Qualifying	Vikersund, Norway	254	833
15 February 2015	(Norway) Anders Fannemel	Vikersundbakken HS225	First	Vikersund, Norway	251.5	825

Longest jump in history at that time, but invalid due to Vassiliev falling upon landing.

== Calendar ==
=== Men's Individual ===
All	No.	Date	Place (Hill)	Size	Winner	Second	Third	Ski flying leader	R.
853	1	10 January 2015	(Austria) Bad Mitterndorf (Kulm HS225)	F _{100}	(Germany) Severin Freund	(Austria) Stefan Kraft	(Slovenia) Jurij Tepeš	(Germany) Severin Freund	
		11 January 2015	(Austria) Bad Mitterndorf (Kulm HS225)	F _{cnx}	strong wind				
862	2	14 February 2015	(Norway) Vikersund (Vikersundbakken HS225)	F _{101}	(Slovenia) Peter Prevc	(Norway) Anders Fannemel	(Japan) Noriaki Kasai	(Germany) Severin Freund (Slovenia) Peter Prevc	
863	3	15 February 2015	(Norway) Vikersund (Vikersundbakken HS225)	F _{102}	(Germany) Severin Freund	(Norway) Anders Fannemel	(Norway) J. André Forfang	(Germany) Severin Freund	
869	4	20 March 2015	(Slovenia) Planica (Letalnica b. Gorišek HS225)	F _{103}	(Slovenia) Peter Prevc	(Slovenia) Jurij Tepeš	(Austria) Stefan Kraft	(Germany) Severin Freund	
870	5	22 March 2015	(Slovenia) Planica (Letalnica b. Gorišek HS225)	F _{104}	(Slovenia) Jurij Tepeš	(Slovenia) Peter Prevc	(Norway) Rune Velta	(Slovenia) Peter Prevc	
18th FIS Ski Flying Men's Overall (10 January – 22 March 2015)					(Slovenia) Peter Prevc	(Germany) Severin Freund	(Slovenia) Jurij Tepeš	Ski Flying Overall	

=== Men's team ===
All	No.	Date	Place (Hill)	Size	Winner	Second	Third	R.
75	1	(Note: Men's team event in Planica (21 March) had only one round.)21 March 2015	(Slovenia) Planica (Letalnica bratov Gorišek HS225)	F _{016}	Slovenia Jurij Tepeš; Anže Semenič; Robert Kranjec; Peter Prevc	Austria Stefan Kraft; Michael Hayböck; Manuel Poppinger; Gregor Schlierenzauer	Norway Johann André Forfang; Kenneth Gangnes; Anders Fannemel; Rune Velta	

== Standings ==
=== Ski Flying ===
Rank	after 5 events	10/01/2015 Kulm	14/02/2015 Vikersund	15/02/2015 Vikersund	20/03/2015 Planica	22/03/2015 Planica	Total
	(Slovenia) Peter Prevc	50	100	15	100	80	345
2	(Germany) Severin Freund	100	50	100	50	36	336
3	(Slovenia) Jurij Tepeš	60	18	29	80	100	287
4	(Japan) Noriaki Kasai	45	60	45	45	32	227
5	(Norway) Rune Velta	40	10	50	40	60	200
6	(Norway) Anders Fannemel	0	80	80	13	24	197
7	(Austria) Stefan Kraft	80	—	—	60	40	190
8	(Norway) Johann André Forfang	20	26	60	29	16	151
9	(Germany) Michael Neumayer	22	24	40	9	12	107
10	(Japan) Daiki Itō	9	32	24	12	22	99
11	(Poland) Piotr Żyła	32	22	16	0	26	96
	(Norway) Andreas Stjernen	0	45	26	11	14	96
13	(Austria) Michael Hayböck	15	—	—	36	40	91
14	(Germany) Markus Eisenbichler	29	20	32	0	9	90
15	(Slovenia) Jernej Damjan	36	0	14	15	13	78
16	(Poland) Kamil Stoch	—	—	—	32	45	77
17	(Japan) Taku Takeuchi	14	29	12	10	3	68
18	(Austria) Gregor Schlierenzauer	7	—	—	22	29	58
19	(Norway) Kenneth Gangnes	—	—	36	0	16	52
	(Germany) Richard Freitag	24	—	—	20	8	52
21	(Slovenia) Robert Kranjec	0	0	5	24	20	49
22	(Russia) Dimitry Vassiliev	0	40	8	—	—	48
	(Austria) Manuel Poppinger	0	7	36	0	5	48
24	(Slovenia) Nejc Dežman	0	14	22	5	6	47
25	(Austria) Manuel Fettner	11	—	—	18	15	44
26	(France) Vincent Descombes Sevoie	12	0	9	7	11	39
27	(Norway) Anders Jacobsen	18	8	—	0	10	36
28	(Czech Republic) Roman Koudelka	26	—	—	2	7	35
	(Slovenia) Anže Semenič	—	5	4	26	—	35
30	(Germany) Marinus Kraus	—	15	18	—	—	33
31	(Japan) Junshirō Kobayashi	13	0	7	6	—	26
32	(Switzerland) Gregor Deschwanden	6	11	3	0	4	24
33	(Finland) Jarkko Määttä	0	—	—	3	18	21
34	(Japan) Shōhei Tochimoto	—	0	20	0	—	20
	(Czech Republic) Jan Matura	16	—	—	4	—	20
36	(Poland) Aleksander Zniszczoł	4	0	13	—	—	17
37	(Norway) Tom Hilde	0	16	0	—	—	16
	(Germany) Stephan Leyhe	0	6	10	0	0	16
39	(Poland) Klemens Murańka	—	—	—	14	—	14
40	(Norway) Phillip Sjøen	—	13	0	—	—	13
	(Czech Republic) Antonín Hájek	1	0	11	1	—	13
42	(Norway) Daniel-André Tande	0	12	—	—	—	12
43	(Austria) Ulrich Wohlgenannt	—	9	2	—	—	11
44	(Austria) Thomas Diethart	10	—	—	—	—	10
45	(Japan) Kento Sakuyama	0	3	6	0	—	9
46	(Italy) Davide Bresadola	8	—	—	0	—	8
	(Finland) Janne Ahonen	—	—	—	8	—	8
48	(Slovenia) Rok Justin	5	—	—	0	—	5
49	(Norway) Ole Marius Ingvaldsen	—	4	—	—	—	4
50	(Norway) Joachim Hauer	3	0	—	—	—	3
51	(Finland) Lauri Asikainen	—	—	—	0	2	2
	(Germany) Pius Paschke	—	2	0	0	—	2
	(Germany) Daniel Wenig	2	—	—	—	—	2
54	(Austria) Simon Greiderer	—	0	1	—	—	1
	(Finland) Harri Olli	—	1	0	0	—	1
	(Slovenia) Matjaž Pungertar	0	—	—	0	1	1

=== Nations Cup (unofficial) ===
Rank	after 6 events	Points
1	Slovenia	1247
2	Norway	929
3	Austria	803
4	Germany	788
5	Japan	649
6	Poland	454
7	Finland	132
8	Czech Republic	118
9	Russia	48
10	France	39
11	Switzerland	24
12	Italy	8
