= 2015–16 FIS Ski Flying World Cup =

2015–2016 season of the FIS Ski Flying World Cup

FIS Ski Flying World Cup 2015/16
Winners
- Overall: (Slovenia) Peter Prevc

Competitions
- Venues: 2
- Individual: 6
- Team: 1

The 2015–16 FIS Ski Flying World Cup was the 19th official World Cup season in ski flying awarded with small crystal globe as the subdiscipline of FIS Ski Jumping World Cup.

== Map of World Cup hosts ==
(Norway) Vikersund	(Slovenia) Planica
Vikersundbakken	Letalnica bratov Gorišek
Europe

== Invalid world record ==
List of world record distance (only invalid this time) achieved within this World Cup season.

Date	Athlete	Hill	Round	Place	Metres	Feet
16 March 2016	(Slovenia) Tilen Bartol	Letalnica bratov Gorišek HS225	Vjumper – hill test – R2	Planica, Slovenia	252	827

2nd longest jump in history (longer than official) at that time, but invalid due to Bartol crashing upon landing.

== Calendar ==
=== Men's Individual ===
All	No.	Date	Place (Hill)	Size	Winner	Second	Third	Ski flying leader	R.
FIS Ski Flying World Championships 2016 (15 – 16 February • (Austria) Bad Mitterndorf)
887	1	(Note: Cancelled large hill event in Oslo (7 February) was rescheduled on ski flying hill to Vikersund (12 February).)12 February 2016	(Norway) Vikersund (Vikersundbakken HS225)	F _{105}	(Slovenia) Robert Kranjec	(Norway) Kenneth Gangnes	(Japan) Noriaki Kasai	(Slovenia) Robert Kranjec	
888	2	13 February 2016	(Norway) Vikersund (Vikersundbakken HS225)	F _{106}	(Slovenia) Peter Prevc	(Norway) Johann André Forfang	(Slovenia) Robert Kranjec	(Slovenia) Robert Kranjec	
889	3	14 February 2016	(Norway) Vikersund (Vikersundbakken HS225)	F _{107}	(Slovenia) Peter Prevc	(Austria) Stefan Kraft	(Norway) Andreas Stjernen	(Slovenia) Peter Prevc	
897	4	(Note: Canceled individual event from Titisee-Neustadt (13 March) was rescheduled to Planica (17 March ).)17 March 2016	(Slovenia) Planica (Letalnica b. Gorišek HS225)	F _{108}	(Slovenia) Peter Prevc	(Norway) Johann André Forfang	(Slovenia) Robert Kranjec	(Slovenia) Peter Prevc	
898	5	18 March 2016	(Slovenia) Planica (Letalnica b. Gorišek HS225)	F _{109}	(Slovenia) Robert Kranjec	(Slovenia) Peter Prevc	(Norway) Johann André Forfang	(Slovenia) Peter Prevc	
899	6	20 March 2016	(Slovenia) Planica (Letalnica b. Gorišek HS225)	F _{110}	(Slovenia) Peter Prevc	(Slovenia) Robert Kranjec	(Norway) Johann André Forfang	(Slovenia) Peter Prevc	
19th FIS Ski Flying Men's Overall (12 February – 20 March 2016)					(Slovenia) Peter Prevc	(Slovenia) Robert Kranjec	(Norway) Johann André Forfang	Ski Flying Overall	

=== Men's team ===
All	No.	Date	Place (Hill)	Size	Winner	Second	Third	R.
81	1	19 March 2016	(Slovenia) Planica (Letalnica bratov Gorišek HS225)	F _{017}	Norway Kenneth Gangnes; Daniel-André Tande; Anders Fannemel; Johann André Forfang	Slovenia Jurij Tepeš; Anže Semenič; Robert Kranjec; Peter Prevc	Austria Stefan Kraft; Manuel Poppinger; Manuel Fettner; Michael Hayböck	

== Standings ==
=== Ski Flying ===
Rank	after 6 events	12/02/2016 Vikersund	13/02/2016 Vikersund	14/02/2016 Vikersund	17/03/2016 Planica	18/03/2016 Planica	20/03/2016 Planica	Total
	(Slovenia) Peter Prevc	50	100	100	100	80	100	530
2	(Slovenia) Robert Kranjec	100	60	0	60	100	80	400
3	(Norway) Johann André Forfang	32	80	36	80	60	60	348
4	(Norway) Kenneth Gangnes	80	50	40	45	45	45	305
5	(Japan) Noriaki Kasai	60	36	26	40	36	50	248
6	(Germany) Severin Freund	26	45	50	50	40	36	247
7	(Austria) Stefan Kraft	45	40	80	26	22	26	239
8	(Austria) Michael Hayböck	40	32	29	36	50	40	227
9	(Norway) Daniel-André Tande	29	29	45	22	32	22	179
10	(Norway) Andreas Stjernen	36	26	60	24	16	15	177
11	(Norway) Anders Fannemel	24	14	32	29	26	29	154
12	(Slovenia) Jurij Tepeš	20	22	18	32	18	20	130
13	(Japan) Daiki Itō	12	20	10	18	29	18	107
	(Germany) Richard Freitag	22	16	14	20	11	24	107
15	(Switzerland) Simon Ammann	16	18	20	15	—	32	101
16	(Japan) Taku Takeuchi	0	13	24	11	20	14	82
17	(Norway) Joachim Hauer	15	24	15	4	13	3	74
18	(Austria) Manuel Poppinger	14	15	11	9	9	9	67
19	(Czech Republic) Roman Koudelka	0	11	0	14	24	13	62
	(Poland) Kamil Stoch	18	—	8	16	10	10	62
21	(Austria) Manuel Fettner	0	0	4	6	15	12	37
22	(Canada) MacKenzie Boyd-Clowes	2	0	9	13	12	—	36
23	(Poland) Piotr Żyła	13	0	22	0	—	—	35
24	(France) Vincent Descombes Sevoie	0	6	6	8	2	11	33
25	(Poland) Maciej Kot	1	1	0	0	14	16	32
	(Germany) Markus Eisenbichler	10	0	3	16	3	—	32
	(Poland) Dawid Kubacki	8	9	0	0	7	8	32
28	(Germany) Andreas Wank	0	12	12	0	0	1	25
29	(Germany) Stephan Leyhe	0	5	—	12	1	5	23
	(Germany) Karl Geiger	0	3	3	10	0	7	23
31	(Norway) Robert Johansson	6	0	13	—	—	—	19
	(Poland) Andrzej Stękała	0	7	5	1	6	—	19
33	(Slovenia) Jaka Hvala	11	2	0	5	0	—	18
	(Japan) Shōhei Tochimoto	7	4	7	0	0	—	18
35	(Austria) Thomas Hofer	9	8	0	0	—	—	17
36	(Poland) Stefan Hula	5	0	—	0	5	6	16
37	(Slovenia) Anže Lanišek	0	10	0	0	0	2	12
38	(Japan) Ryōyū Kobayashi	—	—	—	—	8	—	8
39	(Czech Republic) Lukáš Hlava	—	—	—	7	0	—	7
40	(Czech Republic) Čestmír Kožíšek	4	—	2	—	—	—	6
	(Slovenia) Anže Semenič	—	—	—	2	4	—	6
42	(Czech Republic) Jan Matura	0	—	0	0	0	4	4
43	(Norway) Joacim Ødegård Bjøreng	3	—	—	—	—	—	3
44	(United States) Kevin Bickner	0	—	1	0	—	—	1
