= 2015–16 Four Hills Tournament =

Ski jumping competition

Four Hills Tournament at the 2015–16 FIS Ski Jumping World Cup
- Venue: Schattenbergschanze, Große Olympiaschanze, Bergiselschanze, Paul-Ausserleitner-Schanze
- Location: Austria, Germany
- Dates: 29 December 2015 – 6 January 2016

Medalists
gold medal	(Slovenia) Peter Prevc
silver medal	(Germany) Severin Freund
bronze medal	(Austria) Michael Hayböck

The 2015–16 Four Hills Tournament took place at the four traditional venues of Oberstdorf, Garmisch-Partenkirchen, Innsbruck, and Bischofshofen, located in Germany and Austria, between 29 December 2015 and 6 January 2016.

Peter Prevc won the competition ahead of Severin Freund and Michael Hayböck. By winning the tournament, Prevc became the second ski jumper from Slovenia to win it after Primož Peterka in 1996–97. This was the first tournament since 2007–08 which was not won by an Austrian ski jumper, ending the seven-year streak of the Austrian team.

== Results ==
=== Oberstdorf ===
HS 137 Schattenbergschanze, Germany
29 December 2015

Rank	Name	Nationality	Jump 1 (m)	Jump 2 (m)	Points
1	Severin Freund	Germany	126.0	137.5	307.2
2	Michael Hayböck	Austria	130.0	139.0	304.2
3	Peter Prevc	Slovenia	129.5	130.0	299.9
4	Anders Fannemel	Norway	130.5	129.0	295.8
5	Noriaki Kasai	Japan	127.0	133.5	290.6
6	Kenneth Gangnes	Norway	129.0	135.5	288.6
7	Stefan Kraft	Austria	130.0	127.5	287.7
8	Johann André Forfang	Norway	121.5	127.0	278.8
9	Richard Freitag	Germany	121.0	130.0	276.5
10	Daniel-André Tande	Norway	133.0	119.0	273.9

=== Garmisch-Partenkirchen ===
HS 140 Große Olympiaschanze, Germany
1 January 2016

Rank	Name	Nationality	Jump 1 (m)	Jump 2 (m)	Points
1	Peter Prevc	Slovenia	133.5	136.0	272.7
2	Kenneth Gangnes	Norway	132.0	134.0	260.1
3	Severin Freund	Germany	133.5	132.5	256.8
4	Johann André Forfang	Norway	128.0	133.5	250.8
5	Michael Hayböck	Austria	131.0	132.0	247.3
6	Richard Freitag	Germany	130.0	127.5	243.6
7	Anders Fannemel	Norway	132.5	126.0	241.5
8	Roman Koudelka	Poland	129.0	128.0	241.0
9	Stefan Kraft	Austria	128.5	127.5	238.6
10	Daiki Itō	Japan	130.0	125.0	234.0

=== Innsbruck ===
HS 130 Bergiselschanze, Austria
3 January 2016

Rank	Name	Nationality	Jump 1 (m)	Jump 2 (m)	Points
1	Peter Prevc	Slovenia	130.8	138.7	269.5
2	Severin Freund	Germany	124.1	133.3	258.4
3	Kenneth Gangnes	Norway	127.1	124.4	251.1
4	Johann André Forfang	Norway	122.4	127.3	249.7
5	Michael Hayböck	Austria	119.2	128.3	247.5
6	Andreas Wellinger	Germany	122.5	120.0	239.5
7	Noriaki Kasai	Japan	124.5	119.5	236.8
8	Daiki Itō	Japan	120.0	121.0	235.8
9	Andreas Wank	Germany	120.0	122.5	235.4
10	Richard Freitag	Germany	117.5	123.0	233.3

=== Bischofshofen ===
HS 140 Paul-Ausserleitner-Schanze, Austria
6 January 2016

Rank	Name	Nationality	Jump 1 (m)	Jump 2 (m)	Points
1	Peter Prevc	Slovenia	139.0	142.5	297.3
2	Severin Freund	Germany	136.0	141.0	290.5
3	Michael Hayböck	Austria	136.0	139.0	282.6
4	Stefan Kraft	Austria	136.0	138.0	278.0
5	Kenneth Gangnes	Norway	131.5	137.0	273.3
6	Domen Prevc	Slovenia	132.0	135.5	265.1
7	Johann André Forfang	Norway	135.5	129.5	256.2
8	Simon Ammann	Switzerland	136.0	132.0	255.7
9	Noriaki Kasai	Japan	129.0	131.0	254.8
10	Daiki Itō	Japan	130.5	130.0	251.2

== Overall standings ==
The final standings after all four events:

Rank	Name	Nationality	Oberstdorf	Garmisch- Partenkirchen	Innsbruck	Bischofshofen	Total Points
1st place, gold medalist(s)	Peter Prevc	Slovenia	299.9 (3)	272.7 (1)	269.5 (1)	297.3 (1)	1,139.5
2nd place, silver medalist(s)	Severin Freund	Germany	307.2 (1)	256.8 (3)	258.4 (2)	290.5 (2)	1,112.9
3rd place, bronze medalist(s)	Michael Hayböck	Austria	304.2 (2)	247.3 (5)	247.5 (5)	282.6 (3)	1,081.6
4	Kenneth Gangnes	Norway	288.6 (6)	260.1 (2)	251.5 (3)	273.3 (5)	1,073.5
5	Stefan Kraft	Austria	287.7 (7)	238.6 (9)	231.9 (11)	278.0 (4)	1,036.2
6	Johann André Forfang	Norway	278.8 (8)	250.8 (4)	278.0 (4)	256.2 (7)	1,035.5
7	Noriaki Kasai	Japan	290.6 (5)	231.0 (12)	236.8 (7)	254.8 (9)	1,013.2
8	Anders Fannemel	Norway	295.8 (4)	241.5 (7)	231.8 (12)	241.0 (18)	1,010.1
9	Richard Freitag	Germany	276.5 (9)	243.6 (6)	233.3 (10)	248.0 (11)	1,001.4
10	Andreas Wank	Germany	264.5 (13)	231.8 (11)	235.4 (9)	242.7 (16)	974.4
