= 2015–16 FIS Ski Jumping World Cup =

Ski jumping season

Discipline	Men	Women
Overall	(Slovenia) Peter Prevc	(Japan) Sara Takanashi
Nations Cup	Norway	Austria
Ski flying	(Slovenia) Peter Prevc	—
Four Hills Tournament	(Slovenia) Peter Prevc	—

Competition
Edition	37th	5th
Locations	19	10
Individual	29	17
Team	6	—
Cancelled	2	2
Rescheduled	6 Ind. + 1 Team	0

The 2015–16 FIS Ski Jumping World Cup was the 37th World Cup season in ski jumping for men, the 19th official World Cup season in ski flying and the 5th World Cup season for women.

Season began on 21 November 2015 in Klingenthal, Germany and ended on 20 March 2016 in Planica, Slovenia. Women's World Cup began on 4 December 2015 in Lillehammer, Norway and ended on 28 February 2016 in Almaty, Kazakhstan.

Peter Prevc won overall and ski flying title and Four Hills Tournament and Nations Cup was taken by Team of Norway. Sara Takanashi won her 3rd overall and women's Nations Cup went to Team of Austria.

29 men's individual events on 19 different venues in 10 countries and the 17 women's individual events on 10 different venues in 8 countries had been organised on two different continents (in Europe and Asia). And there were also 6 men's team events, 2 cancelled events for men and women; and 7 men's rescheduled events (6 Ind. and 1 Team).

Almaty (Kazakhstan) hosted ski jumping World Cup events for the first time in history. Cancelled individual event from Titisee-Neustadt was replaced in Planica on 17 March 2016, which meant that Letalnica bratov Gorišek became the 1st hill in history to host four World Cup events in a row.

== Invalid world record ==
List of world record distance (only invalid this time) achieved within this World Cup season.

Date	Athlete	Hill	Round	Place	Metres	Feet
16 March 2016	(Slovenia) Tilen Bartol	Letalnica bratov Gorišek HS225	Vjumper – hill test – R2	Planica, Slovenia	252	827

2nd longest jump in history (longer than official) at that time, but invalid due to Bartol crashing upon landing.

== Map of world cup hosts ==
Europe
Germany	Austria	Asia

== Men's Individual ==
=== Summary ===
Peter Prevc, who was the runner-up in the previous two seasons, dominated the men's season. Prevc secured his first World Cup title by winning the second event in Almaty, six events before the end of the season. At the end of the season, Prevc broke several statistical records. He won the highest number of points in a single season (2303, the previous record being 2083 of Gregor Schlierenzauer from the 2008/09 season) and also recorded the highest number of victories, podium finishes, and average points per event in a season (15 victories, 22 podiums, and 79.41 points on average, the previous records being 13 victories, 20 podiums, and 77.15 points on average from Schlierenzauer's 2008/09 season). The point difference between the first and the second, 813 points, was also the highest ever. By winning the sky flying title, Prevc became the first ski jumper to win the title for three years in a row. In the overall standings, the defending champion Severin Freund finished second and Kenneth Gangnes finished third.

Prevc also won the prestigious 64th Four Hills Tournament. The tournament was broadcast in 57 different countries for 200 million viewers around the globe. Prevc won the competition with the highest total score ever with 1139.4 points and won three events out of four. At the FIS Ski Flying World Championships, which did not count for World Cup points, Prevc became the world champion in sky flying.

The event on 19 December 2015 in Engelberg, Switzerland, marked some interesting statistical features: Peter Prevc and Domen Prevc became first brothers in history who shared a ski jumping World Cup podium; Noriaki Kasai became the oldest contestant on a podium at 43 years and 196 days old; for the first time the oldest Noriaki Kasai (43) and the youngest Domen Prevc (16) participant of any competition both on podium and with record age difference between two on podium. The Prevc brothers finished on the podium again in Sapporo, where they were joined by Robert Kranjec.

Prevc also became only the third ski jumper who managed to win the event with falling or touching the ground upon landing, by winning the ski flying event in Vikersund on 14 February. Such a feat was previously achieved only by Andreas Goldberger in 1995 and Martin Schmitt in 1999.

In team events, Norway won three times, Germany twice, and Slovenia once. The Nations Cup was won by Norway, followed by Slovenia and Germany.

A total of 111,000 people (2,500 / 20,500 / 22,500 / 32,500 / 33,000) has gathered at hill test and 4 days of competitions at final in Planica.

=== Calendar ===
N – normal hill / L – large hill / F – flying hill
All	No.	Date	Place (Hill)	Size	Winner	Second	Third	Overall leader	R.
871	1	22 November 2015	(Germany) Klingenthal (Vogtland Arena HS140)	L _{617}	(Norway) Daniel-André Tande	(Slovenia) Peter Prevc	(Germany) Severin Freund	(Norway) Daniel-André Tande	
		27 November 2015	(Finland) Ruka (Rukatunturi HS142)	L _{cnx}	cancelled due to strong wind and rescheduled in one round next day			—	
		(Note: Cancelled one round event in Kuusamo/Ruka (27 November) rescheduled to 28 November got finally cancelled.)28 November 2015	(Finland) Ruka (Rukatunturi HS142)	L _{cnx}	postponed one round event finally cancelled due to melting inrun			—	
		28 November 2015	(Finland) Ruka (Rukatunturi HS142)	L _{cnx}	strong wind cancelled after 43 of 70 jumpers due to strong wind (one of them rescheduled to Lahti on 19 February)			—	
		5 December 2015	(Norway) Lillehammer (Lysgårdsbakken HS138 / 100)	L _{cnx}	both large hill events were moved to normal hill due to strong wind			—	
		6 December 2015	(Norway) Lillehammer (Lysgårdsbakken HS138 / 100)	L _{cnx}	both large hill events were moved to normal hill due to strong wind			—	
872	2	(Note: Large hill event in Lillehammer (5 December) was moved to normal hill because of strong wind forecast. One round held only.)5 December 2015	(Norway) Lillehammer (Lysgårdsbakken HS138 / 100)	N _{151}	(Germany) Severin Freund	(Norway) Kenneth Gangnes	(Norway) Andreas Stjernen	(Germany) Severin Freund	
873	3	(Note: Large hill event in Lillehammer (6 December) was again moved to normal hill because of strong wind forecast.)6 December 2015	(Norway) Lillehammer (Lysgårdsbakken HS138 / 100)	N _{152}	(Norway) Kenneth Gangnes	(Slovenia) Peter Prevc	(Norway) Johann André Forfang	(Germany) Severin Freund	
874	4	12 December 2015	(Russia) Nizhny Tagil (Tramplin Stork HS134)	L _{618}	(Germany) Severin Freund	(Slovenia) Peter Prevc	(Norway) Joachim Hauer	(Germany) Severin Freund	
875	5	13 December 2015	(Russia) Nizhny Tagil (Tramplin Stork HS134)	L _{619}	(Slovenia) Peter Prevc	(Austria) Michael Hayböck	(Norway) Johann André Forfang	(Slovenia) Peter Prevc	
876	6	19 December 2015	(Switzerland) Engelberg (Gross-Titlis-Schanze HS137)	L _{620}	(Slovenia) Peter Prevc	(Slovenia) Domen Prevc	(Japan) Noriaki Kasai	(Slovenia) Peter Prevc	
877	7	20 December 2015	(Switzerland) Engelberg (Gross-Titlis-Schanze HS137)	L _{621}	(Slovenia) Peter Prevc	(Austria) Michael Hayböck	(Norway) Kenneth Gangnes	(Slovenia) Peter Prevc	
878	8	29 December 2015	(Germany) Oberstdorf (Schattenbergschanze HS137)	L _{622}	(Germany) Severin Freund	(Austria) Michael Hayböck	(Slovenia) Peter Prevc	(Slovenia) Peter Prevc	
879	9	1 January 2016	(Germany) Garmisch-Pa (Gr. Olympiaschanze HS140)	L _{623}	(Slovenia) Peter Prevc	(Norway) Kenneth Gangnes	(Germany) Severin Freund	(Slovenia) Peter Prevc	
880	10	3 January 2016	(Austria) Innsbruck (Bergiselschanze HS130)	L _{624}	(Slovenia) Peter Prevc	(Germany) Severin Freund	(Norway) Kenneth Gangnes	(Slovenia) Peter Prevc	
881	11	6 January 2016	(Austria) Bischofshofen (Paul-Ausserleitner HS140)	L _{625}	(Slovenia) Peter Prevc	(Germany) Severin Freund	(Austria) Michael Hayböck	(Slovenia) Peter Prevc	
64th Four Hills Tournament Overall (29 December 2015 – 6 January 2016)					(Slovenia) Peter Prevc	(Germany) Severin Freund	(Austria) Michael Hayböck	4H Tournament	
882	12	10 January 2016	(Germany) Willingen (Mühlenkopfschanze HS145)	L _{626}	(Slovenia) Peter Prevc	(Norway) Kenneth Gangnes	(Germany) Severin Freund	(Slovenia) Peter Prevc	
FIS Ski Flying World Championships 2016 (15 – 16 January • (Austria) Bad Mitterndorf)
883	13	24 January 2016	(Poland) Zakopane (Wielka Krokiew HS134)	L _{627}	(Austria) Stefan Kraft	(Austria) Michael Hayböck	(Slovenia) Peter Prevc	(Slovenia) Peter Prevc	
884	14	30 January 2016	(Japan) Sapporo (Ōkurayama HS134)	L _{628}	(Slovenia) Peter Prevc	(Slovenia) Domen Prevc	(Slovenia) Robert Kranjec	(Slovenia) Peter Prevc	
885	15	31 January 2016	(Japan) Sapporo (Ōkurayama HS134)	L _{629}	(Norway) Anders Fannemel	(Norway) Johann André Forfang	(Japan) Noriaki Kasai	(Slovenia) Peter Prevc	
		7 February 2016	(Norway) Oslo (Holmenkollbakken HS134)	L _{cnx}	cancelled due to thick fog after hour and a half (rescheduled to Vikersund on 12 February)			—	
886	16	10 February 2016	(Norway) Trondheim (Granåsen HS140)	L _{630}	(Slovenia) Peter Prevc	(Austria) Stefan Kraft	(Japan) Noriaki Kasai	(Slovenia) Peter Prevc	
887	17	(Note: Cancelled large hill event in Oslo (7 February) was rescheduled on ski flying hill to Vikersund (12 February).)12 February 2016	(Norway) Vikersund (Vikersundbakken HS225)	F _{105}	(Slovenia) Robert Kranjec	(Norway) Kenneth Gangnes	(Japan) Noriaki Kasai	(Slovenia) Peter Prevc	
888	18	13 February 2016	(Norway) Vikersund (Vikersundbakken HS225)	F _{106}	(Slovenia) Peter Prevc	(Norway) Johann André Forfang	(Slovenia) Robert Kranjec	(Slovenia) Peter Prevc	
889	19	14 February 2016	(Norway) Vikersund (Vikersundbakken HS225)	F _{107}	(Slovenia) Peter Prevc	(Austria) Stefan Kraft	(Norway) Andreas Stjernen	(Slovenia) Peter Prevc	
890	20	(Note: One of two cancelled events in Kuusamo (27 or 28 November) was rescheduled to Lahti (19 February).)19 February 2016	(Finland) Lahti (Salpausselkä HS130 / 100)	L _{631}	(Austria) Michael Hayböck	(Norway) Daniel-André Tande	(Germany) Severin Freund	(Slovenia) Peter Prevc	
891	21	(Note: Cancelled large hill event in Lahti (21 February) was moved to normal hill.)21 February 2016	(Finland) Lahti (Salpausselkä HS130 / 100)	N _{153}	(Austria) Michael Hayböck	(Germany) Karl Geiger	(Japan) Taku Takeuchi	(Slovenia) Peter Prevc	
892	22	23 February 2016	(Finland) Kuopio (Puijo HS127)	L _{632}	(Austria) Michael Hayböck	(Norway) Daniel-André Tande	(Austria) Stefan Kraft	(Slovenia) Peter Prevc	
893	23	27 February 2016	(Kazakhstan) Almaty (Sunkar HS140)	L _{633}	(Slovenia) Peter Prevc	(Austria) Michael Hayböck	(Germany) Severin Freund	(Slovenia) Peter Prevc	
894	24	28 February 2016	(Kazakhstan) Almaty (Sunkar HS140)	L _{634}	(Slovenia) Peter Prevc	(Germany) Severin Freund	(Norway) Daniel-André Tande	(Slovenia) Peter Prevc	
895	25	4 March 2016	(Poland) Wisła (Malinka HS134)	L _{635}	(Czech Republic) Roman Koudelka	(Norway) Kenneth Gangnes	(Japan) Noriaki Kasai	(Slovenia) Peter Prevc	
		5 March 2016	(Poland) Wisła (Malinka HS134)	L _{cnx}	cancelled due to strong wind			—	
896	26	12 March 2016	(Germany) Titisee-Neustadt (Hochfirstschanze HS142)	L _{636}	(Norway) Johann André Forfang	(Slovenia) Peter Prevc	(Norway) Kenneth Gangnes	(Slovenia) Peter Prevc	
		13 March 2016	(Germany) Titisee-Neustadt (Hochfirstschanze HS142)	L _{cnx}	cancelled due to strong wind and rescheduled to Planica on 17 March			—	
897	27	(Note: Canceled individual event from Titisee-Neustadt (13 March) was rescheduled to Planica (17 March ).)17 March 2016	(Slovenia) Planica (Letalnica b. Gorišek HS225)	F _{108}	(Slovenia) Peter Prevc	(Norway) Johann André Forfang	(Slovenia) Robert Kranjec	(Slovenia) Peter Prevc	
898	28	18 March 2016	(Slovenia) Planica (Letalnica b. Gorišek HS225)	F _{109}	(Slovenia) Robert Kranjec	(Slovenia) Peter Prevc	(Norway) Johann André Forfang	(Slovenia) Peter Prevc	
899	29	20 March 2016	(Slovenia) Planica (Letalnica b. Gorišek HS225)	F _{110}	(Slovenia) Peter Prevc	(Slovenia) Robert Kranjec	(Norway) Johann André Forfang	(Slovenia) Peter Prevc	
37th FIS World Cup Men's Overall (22 November 2015 – 20 March 2016)					(Slovenia) Peter Prevc	(Germany) Severin Freund	(Norway) Kenneth Gangnes	World Cup Overall	

=== Standings ===
==== Overall ====
Rank	after 29 events	Points
1	(Slovenia) Peter Prevc (h.s.e.)	2303
2	(Germany) Severin Freund	1490
3	(Norway) Kenneth Gangnes	1348
4	(Austria) Michael Hayböck	1301
5	(Norway) Johann André Forfang	1240
6	(Austria) Stefan Kraft	1006
7	(Norway) Daniel-André Tande	985
8	(Japan) Noriaki Kasai	909
9	(Germany) Richard Freitag	680
10	(Norway) Anders Fannemel	670

==== Nations Cup ====
Rank	after 35 events	Points
1	Norway	7202
2	Slovenia	5760
3	Germany	5409
4	Austria	4652
5	Japan	3088
6	Poland	2154
7	Czech Republic	1881
8	Switzerland	793
9	Finland	256
10	France	228

==== Prize money ====
Rank	after 35 events	CHF
1	(Slovenia) Peter Prevc	248,800
2	(Germany) Severin Freund	169,500
3	(Norway) Kenneth Gangnes	168,300
4	(Norway) Johann André Forfang	150,000
5	(Austria) Michael Hayböck	149,100
6	(Norway) Daniel-André Tande	132,000
7	(Austria) Stefan Kraft	119,400
8	(Japan) Noriaki Kasai	99,900
9	(Norway) Anders Fannemel	94,950
10	(Germany) Richard Freitag	88,350

==== Ski Flying ====
Rank	after 6 events	Points
1	(Slovenia) Peter Prevc	530
2	(Slovenia) Robert Kranjec	400
3	(Norway) Johann André Forfang	348
4	(Norway) Kenneth Gangnes	305
5	(Japan) Noriaki Kasai	248
6	(Germany) Severin Freund	247
7	(Austria) Stefan Kraft	239
8	(Austria) Michael Hayböck	227
9	(Norway) Daniel-André Tande	179
10	(Norway) Andreas Stjernen	177

==== Four Hills Tournament ====
Rank	after 4 events	Points
1	(Slovenia) Peter Prevc (h.s.e.)	1139.4
2	(Germany) Severin Freund	1112.9
3	(Austria) Michael Hayböck	1081.6
4	(Norway) Kenneth Gangnes	1073.5
5	(Austria) Stefan Kraft	1036.2
6	(Norway) J. André Forfang	1035.5
7	(Japan) Noriaki Kasai	1013.2
8	(Norway) Anders Fannemel	1010.1
9	(Germany) Richard Freitag	1001.4
10	(Germany) Andreas Wank	974.4

== Women's Individual ==
=== Summary ===
Sara Takanashi won her third overall title. She won 14 out of 17 events in held in the season and secured the title several events before the end.

Daniela Iraschko-Stolz finished second, while Maja Vtič finished third. No team events for women or mixed team events were scheduled this season. Since the last two events of the season were cancelled due to lack of snow, the award ceremony took place in Planica, together with men's.

=== Calendar ===
All	No.	Date	Place (Hill)	Size	Winner	Second	Third	Overall leader	R.
61	1	4 December 2015	(Norway) Lillehammer (Lysgårdsbakken HS100)	N _{057}	(Japan) Sara Takanashi	(Slovenia) Maja Vtič	(Norway) Maren Lundby	(Japan) Sara Takanashi	
62	2	12 December 2015	(Russia) Nizhny Tagil (Tramplin Stork HS97)	N _{058}	(Austria) Daniela Iraschko-Stolz	(Japan) Sara Takanashi	(Austria) Eva Pinkelnig	(Japan) Sara Takanashi	
63	3	13 December 2015	(Russia) Nizhny Tagil (Tramplin Stork HS97)	N _{059}	(Japan) Sara Takanashi	(Japan) Yūki Itō	(Austria) Chiara Hölzl	(Japan) Sara Takanashi	
64	4	16 January 2016	(Japan) Sapporo (Miyanomori HS100)	N _{060}	(Japan) Sara Takanashi	(Slovenia) Ema Klinec	(Austria) Daniela Iraschko-Stolz	(Japan) Sara Takanashi	
65	5	17 January 2016	(Japan) Sapporo (Miyanomori HS100)	N _{061}	(Japan) Sara Takanashi	(Austria) Daniela Iraschko-Stolz	(Austria) J. Seifriedsberger	(Japan) Sara Takanashi	
66	6	(Note: Women's individual event in Zaō (22 January) had only one round due to strong wind.)22 January 2016	(Japan) Zaō (Yamagata HS106)	N _{062}	(Japan) Sara Takanashi	(Austria) Daniela Iraschko-Stolz	(Slovenia) Maja Vtič	(Japan) Sara Takanashi	
67	7	23 January 2016	(Japan) Zaō (Yamagata HS106)	N _{063}	(Japan) Sara Takanashi	(Slovenia) Maja Vtič	(Slovenia) Ema Klinec	(Japan) Sara Takanashi	
68	8	30 January 2016	(Germany) Oberstdorf (Schattenberg HS106)	N _{064}	(Japan) Sara Takanashi	(Austria) Daniela Iraschko-Stolz	(Slovenia) Ema Klinec	(Japan) Sara Takanashi	
69	9	31 January 2016	(Germany) Oberstdorf (Schattenberg HS106)	N _{065}	(Japan) Sara Takanashi	(Austria) Daniela Iraschko-Stolz	(Norway) Maren Lundby	(Japan) Sara Takanashi	
70	10	4 February 2016	(Norway) Oslo (Holmenkollbakken HS134)	L _{005}	(Japan) Sara Takanashi	(Norway) Maren Lundby	(Russia) Irina Avvakumova	(Japan) Sara Takanashi	
71	11	6 February 2016	(Austria) Hinzenbach (Aigner-Schanze HS94)	N _{066}	(Japan) Sara Takanashi	(Austria) Daniela Iraschko-Stolz	(Norway) Maren Lundby	(Japan) Sara Takanashi	
72	12	7 February 2016	(Austria) Hinzenbach (Aigner-Schanze HS94)	N _{067}	(Japan) Sara Takanashi	(Austria) Daniela Iraschko-Stolz	(Austria) J. Seifriedsberger	(Japan) Sara Takanashi	
73	13	13 February 2016	(Slovenia) Ljubno (Savina HS95)	N _{068}	(Slovenia) Maja Vtič	(Japan) Sara Takanashi	(Slovenia) Špela Rogelj	(Japan) Sara Takanashi	
74	14	14 February 2016	(Slovenia) Ljubno (Savina HS95)	N _{069}	(Austria) Daniela Iraschko-Stolz	(Slovenia) Maja Vtič	(Austria) Chiara Hölzl	(Japan) Sara Takanashi	
75	15	19 February 2016	(Finland) Lahti (Salpausselkä HS100)	N _{070}	(Japan) Sara Takanashi	(Slovenia) Maja Vtič	(Japan) Yūki Itō	(Japan) Sara Takanashi	
76	16	27 February 2016	(Kazakhstan) Almaty (Sunkar HS106)	N _{071}	(Japan) Sara Takanashi	(Austria) Daniela Iraschko-Stolz	(Austria) Jacqueline Seifriedsberger	(Japan) Sara Takanashi	
77	17	28 February 2016	(Kazakhstan) Almaty (Sunkar HS106)	N _{072}	(Japan) Sara Takanashi	(Austria) Daniela Iraschko-Stolz	(Slovenia) Maja Vtič	(Japan) Sara Takanashi	
		5 March 2016	(Romania) Râșnov (Trambulina Valea HS100)	N _{cnx}	cancelled due to warm weather and lack of snow; since season final can't be rescheduled, women's crystal globe and nations cup trophy were awarded at men's final in Planica			—	
		6 March 2016	(Romania) Râșnov (Trambulina Valea HS100)	N _{cnx}	cancelled due to warm weather and lack of snow; since season final can't be rescheduled, women's crystal globe and nations cup trophy were awarded at men's final in Planica			—	
5th FIS World Cup Women's Overall (4 December 2015 – 6 March 2016)					(Japan) Sara Takanashi	(Austria) Daniela Iraschko-Stolz	(Slovenia) Maja Vtič	World Cup Overall	

=== Standings ===
==== Overall ====
Rank	after 17 events	Points
1	(Japan) Sara Takanashi	1610
2	(Austria) Daniela Iraschko-Stolz	1139
3	(Slovenia) Maja Vtič	908
4	(Austria) J. Seifriedsberger	695
5	(Austria) Chiara Hölzl	632
6	(Norway) Maren Lundby	586
7	(Russia) Irina Avvakumova	572
8	(Japan) Yūki Itō	505
9	(Slovenia) Ema Klinec	426
10	(Slovenia) Špela Rogelj	415

==== Nations Cup ====
Rank	after 17 events	Points
1	Austria	2886
2	Japan	2565
3	Slovenia	2290
4	Germany	1358
5	Russia	787
6	Norway	707
7	United States	445
8	Italy	382
9	France	298
10	Canada	229

==== Prize money ====
Rank	after 17 events	CHF
1	(Japan) Sara Takanashi	48,300
2	(Austria) Daniela Iraschko-Stolz	34,095
3	(Slovenia) Maja Vtič	26,970
4	(Austria) J. Seifriedsberger	20,850
5	(Austria) Chiara Hölzl	18,960
6	(Norway) Maren Lundby	17,550
7	(Russia) Irina Avvakumova	16,875
8	(Japan) Yūki Itō	14,930
9	(Slovenia) Ema Klinec	12,465
10	(Slovenia) Špela Rogelj	12,255

== Team events ==
=== Calendar ===
N – normal hill / L – large hill
All	No.	Date	Place (Hill)	Size	Winner	Second	Third	R.
Men's team
76	1	21 November 2015	(Germany) Klingenthal (Vogtland Arena HS140)	L _{058}	Germany Andreas Wellinger; Andreas Wank; Richard Freitag; Severin Freund	Slovenia Domen Prevc; Jurij Tepeš; Anže Lanišek; Peter Prevc	Austria Michael Hayböck; Gregor Schlierenzauer; Manuel Fettner; Stefan Kraft	
77	2	(Note: Men's team event in Willingen (9 January) had only one round due to strong wind.)9 January 2016	(Germany) Willingen (Mühlenkopfschanze HS145)	L _{059}	Germany Andreas Wank; Andreas Wellinger; Richard Freitag; Severin Freund	Norway Andreas Stjernen; Daniel-André Tande; Kenneth Gangnes; Johann André Forfang	Austria Stefan Kraft; Manuel Poppinger; Manuel Fettner; Michael Hayböck	
78	3	23 January 2016	(Poland) Zakopane (Wielka Krokiew HS134)	L _{060}	Norway Anders Fannemel; Andreas Stjernen; Daniel-André Tande; Kenneth Gangnes	Austria Stefan Kraft; Manuel Poppinger; Manuel Fettner; Michael Hayböck	Poland Andrzej Stękała; Maciej Kot; Stefan Hula, Jr. Kamil Stoch	
79	4	6 February 2016	(Norway) Oslo (Holmenkollbakken HS134)	L _{061}	Slovenia Jurij Tepeš; Domen Prevc; Robert Kranjec; Peter Prevc	Norway Daniel-André Tande; Anders Fannemel; Johann André Forfang; Kenneth Gangnes	Japan Taku Takeuchi; Kento Sakuyama; Daiki Itō; Noriaki Kasai	
		20 February 2016	(Finland) Lahti (Salpausselkä HS130)	L _{cnx}	cancelled due to strong wind and rescheduled to Kuopio on 22 February			
80	5	(Note: Men's team cancelled event in Lahti (20 February) was rescheduled to Kuopio (22 February).)22 February 2016	(Finland) Kuopio (Puijo HS 127)	L _{062}	Norway Kenneth Gangnes; Daniel-André Tande; Anders Fannemel; Johann André Forfang	Germany Andreas Wank; Richard Freitag; Andreas Wellinger; Severin Freund	Japan Taku Takeuchi; Kento Sakuyama; Daiki Itō; Noriaki Kasai	
81	6	19 March 2016	(Slovenia) Planica (Letalnica bratov Gorišek HS225)	F _{017}	Norway Kenneth Gangnes; Daniel-André Tande; Anders Fannemel; Johann André Forfang	Slovenia Jurij Tepeš; Anže Semenič; Robert Kranjec; Peter Prevc	Austria Stefan Kraft; Manuel Poppinger; Manuel Fettner; Michael Hayböck	

== Qualifications ==
=== Men ===
No.	Place	Qualifications	Competition	Size	Winner
1	(Germany) Klingenthal	22 November 2015		L	(Norway) Johann André Forfang
	(Norway) Lillehammer	cancelled	5 December 2015	N	strong wind
2	(Norway) Lillehammer	6 December 2015		N	(Czech Republic) Roman Koudelka
3	(Russia) Nizhny Tagil	11 December 2015	12 December 2015	L	(Norway) Anders Fannemel
4	(Russia) Nizhny Tagil	13 December 2015		L	(Norway) Joachim Hauer
5	(Switzerland) Engelberg	18 December 2015	19 December 2015	L	(Slovenia) Anže Lanišek
6	(Switzerland) Engelberg	20 December 2015		L	(Norway) Anders Fannemel
7	(Germany) Oberstdorf	28 December 2015	29 December 2015	L	(Slovenia) Peter Prevc
8	(Germany) Garmisch-Pa	31 December 2015	1 January 2016	L	(Slovenia) Peter Prevc
9	(Austria) Innsbruck	2 January 2016	3 January 2016	L	(Austria) Michael Hayböck
10	(Austria) Bischofshofen	5 January 2016	6 January 2016	L	(Norway) Kenneth Gangnes
11	(Germany) Willingen	8 January 2016	10 January 2016	L	(Slovenia) Jurij Tepeš
12	(Poland) Zakopane	22 January 2016	24 January 2016	L	(Poland) Kamil Stoch
13	(Japan) Sapporo	29 January 2016	30 January 2016	L	(Japan) Taku Takeuchi (Poland) Dawid Kubacki
14	(Japan) Sapporo	31 January 2016		L	(Norway) Joachim Hauer
15	(Norway) Oslo	5 February 2016	cancelled	L	(Poland) Stefan Hula
16	(Norway) Trondheim	9 February 2016	10 February 2016	L	(Japan) Daiki Itō
	(Norway) Vikersund	not scheduled	12 February 2016	F	all competitors in competition
17	(Norway) Vikersund	13 February 2016		F	(Japan) Taku Takeuchi
18	(Norway) Vikersund	14 February 2016		F	(Norway) Joachim Hauer
19	(Finland) Lahti	19 February 2016		L	(Austria) Manuel Poppinger
20	(Finland) Lahti	21 February 2016		N	(Poland) Dawid Kubacki
21	(Finland) Kuopio	22 February 2016	23 February 2016	L	(Poland) Kamil Stoch
22	(Kazakhstan) Almaty	26 February 2016	27 February 2016	L	(Poland) Maciej Kot
23	(Kazakhstan) Almaty	28 February 2016		L	(Japan) Taku Takeuchi
24	(Poland) Wisła	3 March 2016	4 March 2016	L	(Czech Republic) Roman Koudelka
25	(Germany) Titisee-Neustadt	11 March 2016	12 March 2016	L	(Slovenia) Domen Prevc
	(Slovenia) Planica	not scheduled	17 March 2016	F	all competitors in competition
26	(Slovenia) Planica	17 March 2016	18 March 2016	F	(Poland) Maciej Kot
	(Slovenia) Planica	not scheduled	20 March 2016	F	top thirty in season final only

=== Women ===
No.	Place	Qualifications	Competition	Size	Winner
1	(Norway) Lillehammer	3 December 2015	4 December 2015	N	(France) Julia Clair
2	(Russia) Nizhny Tagil	11 December 2015	12 December 2015	N	(France) Julia Clair
3	(Russia) Nizhny Tagil	13 December 2015		N	(France) Julia Clair
4	(Japan) Sapporo	15 January 2016	16 January 2016	N	(Slovenia) Urša Bogataj
5	(Japan) Sapporo	17 January 2016	17 January 2016	N	(Italy) Elena Runggaldier
6	(Japan) Zaō	21 January 2016	22 January 2016	N	(Slovenia) Špela Rogelj
7	(Japan) Zaō	23 January 2016		N	(Slovenia) Ema Klinec
8	(Germany) Oberstdorf	29 January 2016	30 January 2016	N	(Japan) Yūka Setō
9	(Germany) Oberstdorf	31 January 2016		N	(France) Julia Clair
	(Norway) Oslo	not scheduled	4 February 2016	L	top thirty competitors only
10	(Austria) Hinzenbach	6 February 2016		N	(Slovenia) Špela Rogelj
11	(Austria) Hinzenbach	7 February 2016		N	(Slovenia) Špela Rogelj
12	(Slovenia) Ljubno	12 February 2016	13 February 2016	N	(Slovenia) Špela Rogelj
13	(Slovenia) Ljubno	14 February 2016		N	(Slovenia) Nika Križnar
	(Finland) Lahti	not scheduled	19 February 2016	N	all competitors in competition
	(Kazakhstan) Almaty	not scheduled	27 February 2016	N	all competitors in competition
	(Kazakhstan) Almaty	not scheduled	28 February 2016	N	all competitors in competition

== Head coach ==
=== Nations ===
Team	Men	Ladies
Austria	Heinz Kuttin (AUT)	Andreas Felder (AUT)
Bulgaria	Emil Zografski (BUL)	
Canada	Gregor Linsig (CAN)	Gregor Linsig (CAN)
China		
Czech Republic	Richard Schallert (AUT)	Jiří Hájek (CZE)
Estonia	Tambet Pikkor (EST)	
Finland	Jani Klinga (FIN)	Kimmo Kykkaenen (FIN)
France	Gérard Colin (FRA)	Frédéric Zoz (FRA)
Germany	Werner Schuster (AUT)	Andreas Bauer (GER)
Italy	Walter Cogoli (ITA)	Janko Zwitter (AUT)
Japan	Tomoharu Yokokawa (JPN)	Tomoharu Yokokawa (JPN)
Kazakhstan	Janez Debelak (SLO)	
Norway	Alexander Stöckl (AUT)	Christian Meyer (NOR)
Poland	Łukasz Kruczek (POL)	Sławomir Hankus (POL)
Romania		Csaba Magdo (ROU)
Russia	Matjaž Zupan (SLO)	Matjaž Triplat (SLO)
Slovenia	Goran Janus (SLO)	Stane Baloh (SLO)
South Korea	Wolfgang Hartmann (GER)	
Switzerland	Pipo Schödler (SUI)	
United States	Bine Norčič (SLO)	Vasja Bajc (SLO)

== Achievements ==
First World Cup career victory

- (Norway) Daniel-André Tande (21), in his third season – the WC 1 in Klingenthal
- (Norway) Kenneth Gangnes (26), in his seventh season – the WC 3 in Lillehammer
- (Slovenia) Maja Vtič (28), in her fifth season – the WC 13 in Ljubno
- (Norway) Johann André Forfang (20), in his second season – the WC 26 in Titisee-Neustadt

First World Cup podium

- (Norway) Daniel-André Tande (21), in his third season – the WC 1 in Klingenthal
- (Norway) Kenneth Gangnes (26), in his seventh season – the WC 2 in Lillehammer
- (Austria) Eva Pinkelnig (27), in her second season – the WC 2 in Nizhny Tagil
- (Norway) Joachim Hauer (24), in his third season – the WC 4 in Nizhny Tagil
- (Slovenia) Domen Prevc (16), in his first season – the WC 6 in Engelberg
- (Slovenia) Ema Klinec (17), in her second season – the WC 4 in Sapporo
- (Germany) Karl Geiger (23), in his fourth season – the WC 21 in Lahti

Number of wins this season (in brackets are all-time wins)

- (Slovenia) Peter Prevc – 15 (21)
- (Japan) Sara Takanashi – 14 (44)
- (Germany) Severin Freund – 3 (21)
- (Austria) Michael Hayböck – 3 (4)
- (Austria) Daniela Iraschko-Stolz – 2 (12)
- (Slovenia) Robert Kranjec – 2 (7)
- (Czech Republic) Roman Koudelka – 1 (5)
- (Austria) Stefan Kraft – 1 (4)
- (Norway) Anders Fannemel – 1 (3)
- (Norway) Daniel-André Tande – 1 (1)
- (Norway) Kenneth Gangnes – 1 (1)
- (Slovenia) Maja Vtič – 1 (1)
- (Norway) Johann André Forfang – 1 (1)

== See also ==
- 2015 Grand Prix (top level summer series)
- 2015–16 FIS Continental Cup (2nd level competition)
