= Bregarca =

Ski jumping hill in Dolenja vas, Železniki, Slovenia

Coordinates: 46.2093°N 14.2172°E

- Constructor(s): Stanko Bloudek
- Location: Dolenja Vas, Železniki, Slovenia
- Operator: ŠD Dolenja vas
- Opened: September 1952/53
- Renovated: 2004

Size
- K–point: 25 m
- Hill record: 23 m (75 ft)

Bregarca is a ski jumping hill from 1952 or 1953 with calculation point at K25 and located in Dolenja vas, Železniki, Slovenia. Hill is managed by ŠD Dolenja vas.

== History ==
People in those places were jumping on the edge of farm fields and hill wherever they could. That's why they came up with idea to build a real ski jumping hill. At first Bloudek constructed a hill that was little bigger hill than Bregarca which stood outside of the village towards neighbour's village Selca. There were held some competitions but the didn't really establish, it was to far from village and also terrain configuration wasn't appropriate.

That's why on an initiative of a local enthusiast Jože Megušar in the middle of the village at time a new Bregarca K20 hill was constructed by Stanko Bloudek. By various sources it isn't clear if it was built some claim in 1952 or by others in September 1953.

People were so enthusiastic that they built this hill in eight days without machines and no money. Bloudek didn't believe it they were so fast and thought Megušar was mocking him until he didn't come and see.

In December 2001 Peter Prevc made his first ski jumping steps on this hill. His personal best on this hill is 21 metres (69 ft). Thanks to his success it became from unknown and unimportant to very famous hill. It is standing just couple of hundred metres away from his home. The competitors in youngest categories are still competing every winter.

== Name ==
Hill was named after a nearby standing Bregar farm on which owner's land that hill is standing. Bregarca is diminutive word for Bregar.
