= Sunkar International Ski Jumping Complex =

Ski jumping center in Almaty, Kazakhstan

Coordinates: 43°12′45″N 76°56′06″E

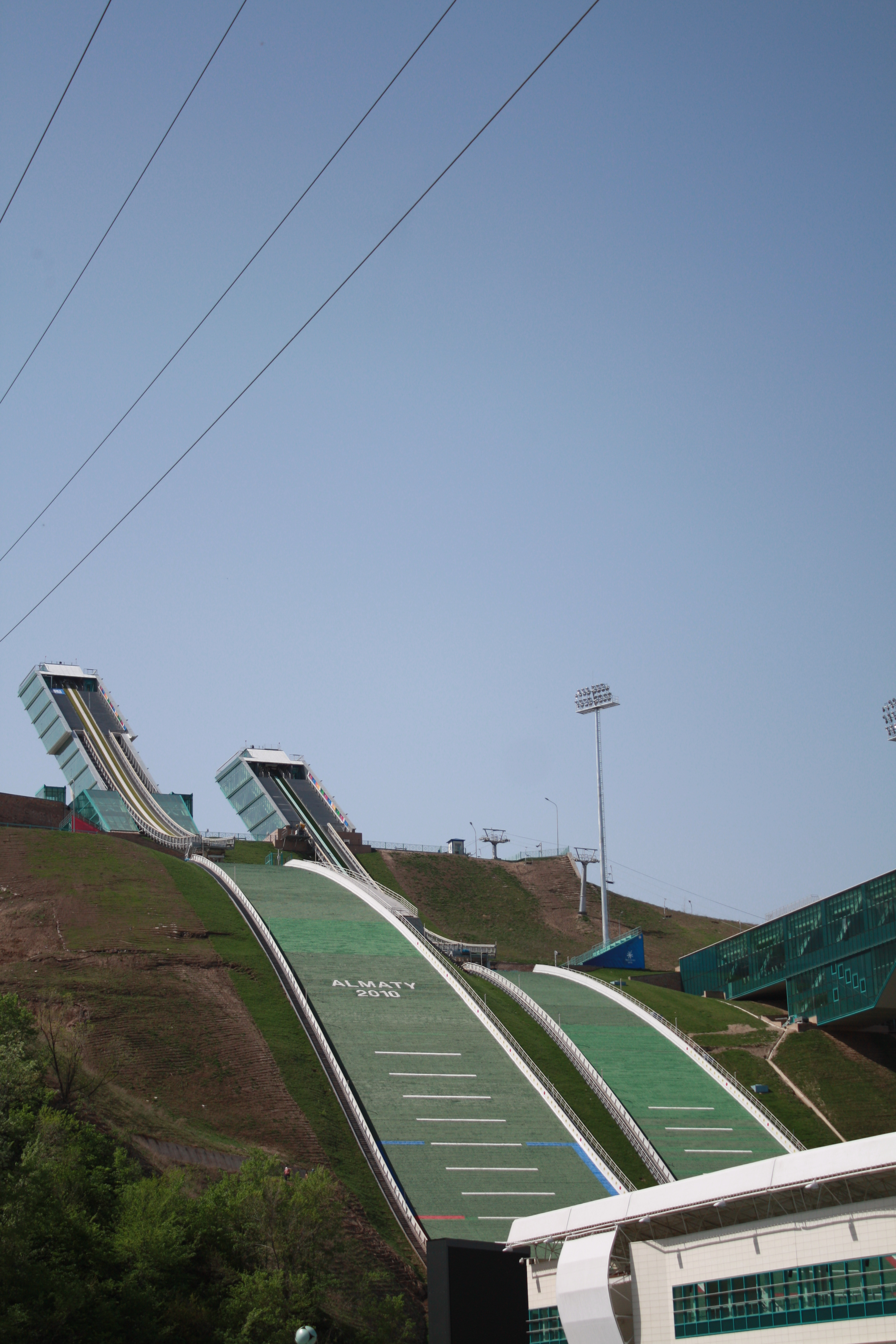
- Location: Gorniy Gigant District, Almaty, Kazakhstan
- Opened: 25 September 2010

Size
- K–point: 20, 40, 60, 95, 125 m
- Hill size: 66, 106, 140 m
- Longest jump (unofficial / fall): 145 m (475 ft) (Slovenia) Peter Prevc (27 February 2016)
- Hill record: 141.5 m (464 ft) (Germany) Severin Freund (28 February 2016)

Top events
- Asian Winter Games: 2011

The Sunkar International Ski Jumping Complex (Kazakh: «Сұңқар» халықаралық шаңғы трамплиндер кешені, romanized: “Sūñqar“ halyqaralyq şañğy tramplinder keşenı; Russian: Международный Комплекс Лыжных Трамплинов “Сункар”, romanized: Mezhdunarodnyy Kompleks Lyzhnykh Tramplinov “Sunkar”) is ski jumping center in Almaty, Kazakhstan. It's located in Gorniy Gigant District in the southern part of the city at an altitude of 900 metres above sea level in a unique place where there is almost no wind.

Sports: ski jumping, Nordic combined. The total area is 15137 km. The length of the large jumps is 125 and 90 meters.

== History ==
In 1956, under the supervision of Eduard Chuprov, a teacher of the Institute of Physical Education, a 55-meter ski jump was restored, and a few years later the first national ski jumping and Nordic combined competitions were held in the Kazakh SSR. The first international competitions with the participation of 9 Soviet republics were held in 1959. Over time, the ski jump fell into disrepair and was destroyed.

The complex was built in 2010 on the site of the old ski jumping complex with 5,500 seating capacity.

For the Nordic World Junior Championships a new track was built at the complex, which meets modern requirements: a tracking system, timing system and lighting. The southern part of the track is asphalted to create both a competition area and a recreation area for citizens.

In 2011-2016, the springboard complex hosted the retro-festival "Alma-Ata - My First Love", becoming a new venue after the Alatau Sanatorium.

== Features ==
The complex consists of five ski-jumps: K125, K95, and the training ramps K60, K40 and K20. Both artificial turf and snow can be used in every season. The complex also features a permanent multifunctional building with stands for 5,500 seats, a media press centre, a hotel, snowmaking and irrigation systems, a chairlift and underground car park, track and finish area for Nordic Combined, and a helipad.

== Events ==
=== Men ===
Date	Hillsize	Competition	Winner	Second	Third
30 August 2011 (night)	HS140	SGP	(Slovenia) Jurij Tepeš	(Slovenia) Jure Šinkovec	(Norway) Anders Fannemel
22 September 2012	HS140	SGP	(Slovenia) Jurij Tepeš	(Norway) Anders Fannemel	(Norway) Tom Hilde
23 September 2012	HS140	SGP	(Japan) Taku Takeuchi	(Slovenia) Jurij Tepeš	(Norway) Anders Bardal
21 September 2013	HS140	SGP	(Norway) Anders Bardal	(Slovenia) Jernej Damjan	(Czech Republic) Antonín Hájek
22 September 2013	HS140	SGP	(Slovenia) Matjaž Pungertar	(Slovenia) Jernej Damjan	(Japan) Reruhi Shimizu
20 September 2014 (night)	HS140	SGP	(Slovenia) Jernej Damjan	(Japan) Reruhi Shimizu	(Russia) Vladislav Boyarintsev
21 September 2014	HS140	SGP	(Japan) Taku Takeuchi	(Slovenia) Jernej Damjan	(Norway) Phillip Sjøen
12 September 2015 (night)	HS140	SGP	(Austria) Stefan Kraft	(Japan) Reruhi Shimizu	(Russia) Ilmir Hazetdinov
13 September 2015 (night)	HS140	SGP	(Japan) Junshirō Kobayashi	(Austria) Stefan Kraft	(Japan) Kento Sakuyama
27 February 2016 (night)	HS140	WC	(Slovenia) Peter Prevc	(Austria) Michael Hayböck	(Germany) Severin Freund
28 February 2016 (night)	HS140	WC	(Slovenia) Peter Prevc	(Germany) Severin Freund	(Norway) Daniel Andre Tande

=== Ladies ===
Date	Hillsize	Competition	Winner	Second	Third
22 September 2012	HS106	SGP	(Japan) Sara Takanashi	(Slovenia) Katja Požun	(Canada) Alexandra Pretorius
23 September 2012	HS106	SGP	(Japan) Sara Takanashi	(Russia) Irina Avvakumova	(Canada) Alexandra Pretorius
21 September 2013	HS106	SGP	(Japan) Sara Takanashi	(France) Coline Mattel	(Japan) Yurina Yamada
22 September 2013	HS106	SGP	(Japan) Sara Takanashi	(Slovenia) Katja Požun	(Canada) Atsuko Tanaka
20 September 2014	HS106	SGP	(Japan) Sara Takanashi	(Russia) Irina Avvakumova	(Japan) Yūki Itō
21 September 2014	HS106	SGP	(Japan) Sara Takanashi	(Germany) Katharina Althaus	(Slovenia) Maja Vtič
12 September 2015	HS106	SGP	(Japan) Sara Takanashi	(United States) Nita Englund	(Japan) Yūki Itō
13 September 2015	HS106	SGP	(Japan) Sara Takanashi	(Japan) Yūki Itō	(Austria) Jacqueline Seifriedsberger
27 February 2016	HS106	WC	(Japan) Sara Takanashi	(Austria) Daniela Iraschko-Stolz	(Austria) Jacqueline Seifriedsberger
28 February 2016	HS106	WC	(Japan) Sara Takanashi	(Austria) Daniela Iraschko-Stolz	(Slovenia) Maja Vtič

== See also ==
- Gorniy Gigant District
