= Peter Prevc =

Slovenian ski jumper (born 1992)

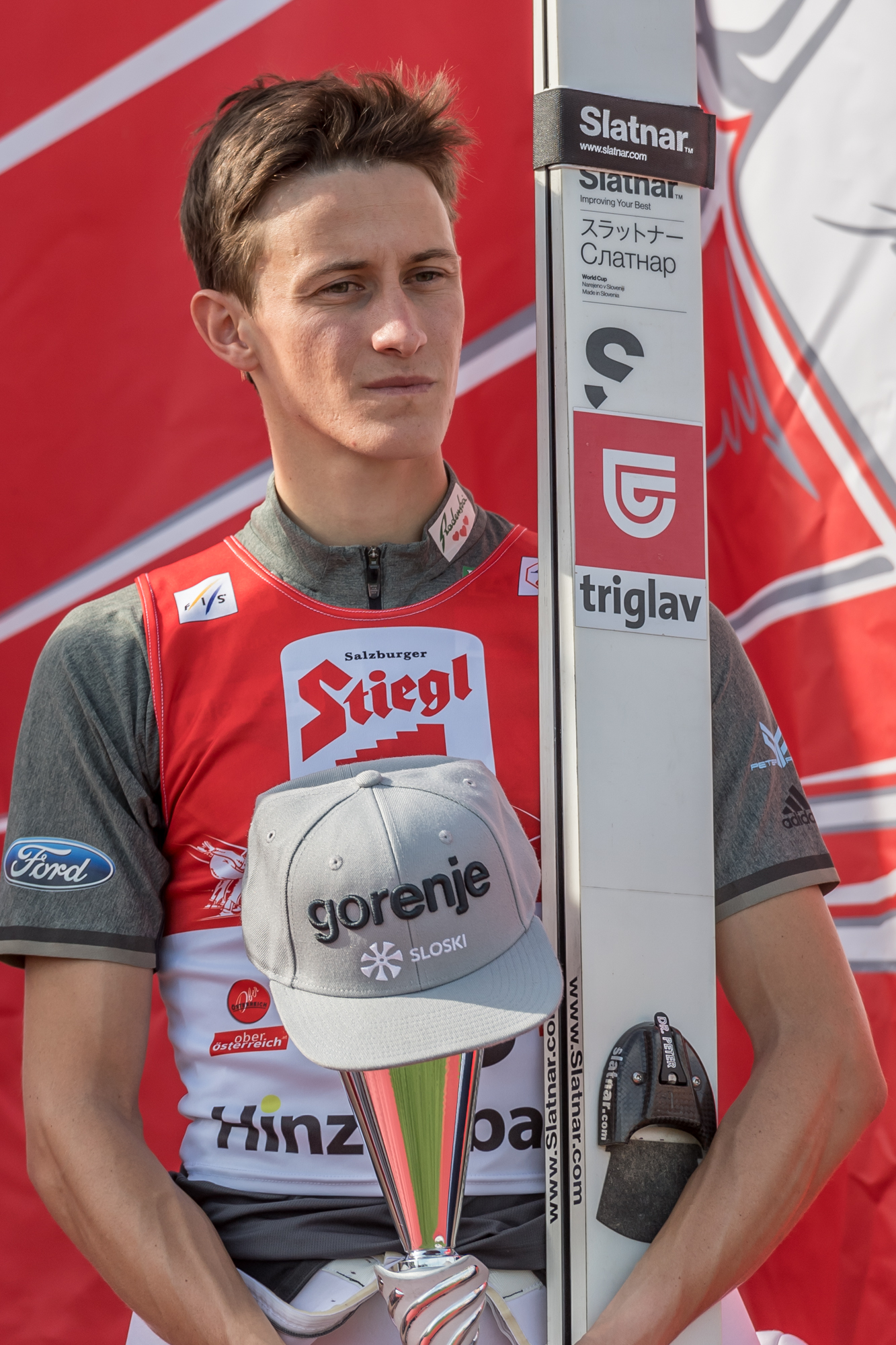
- Prevc in Hinzenbach in 2016

Personal information
- Born: 20 September 1992 (age 34) Kranj, Slovenia
- Height: 1.79 m (5 ft 10 in)

Sport
- Sport: Ski jumping

World Cup career
- Seasons: 2010–2024
- Indiv. starts: 345
- Indiv. podiums: 62
- Indiv. wins: 24
- Team starts: 69
- Team podiums: 31
- Team wins: 12
- Overall titles: 1 (2016)
- Four Hills titles: 1 (2016)
- Ski Flying titles: 3 (2014, 2015, 2016)

Achievements and titles
- Personal bests: 250 m (820 ft); Vikersund, 14 February 2015
Medal record
Event	1st	2nd	3rd
Olympic Games	1	2	1
World Championships	0	1	2
Ski Flying World Championships	3	1	1
Total	4	4	4
Representing Slovenia
Men's ski jumping
Olympic Games
Gold medal – first place	2022 Beijing	Mixed team
Silver medal – second place	2014 Sochi	Individual NH
Silver medal – second place	2022 Beijing	Team LH
Bronze medal – third place	2014 Sochi	Individual LH
World Championships
Silver medal – second place	2013 Val di Fiemme	Individual LH
Bronze medal – third place	2011 Oslo	Team LH
Bronze medal – third place	2013 Val di Flemme	Individual NH
Men's ski flying
World Championships
Gold medal – first place	2016 Bad Mitterndorf	Individual
Gold medal – first place	2022 Vikersund	Team
Gold medal – first place	2024 Bad Mitterndorf	Team
Silver medal – second place	2018 Oberstdorf	Team
Bronze medal – third place	2014 Harrachov	Individual

Peter Prevc (Slovene: [ˈpéːtəɾ ˈpɾéːwts]; born 20 September 1992) is a Slovenian former ski jumper. He won the 2016 Ski Jumping World Cup overall title and four Olympic medals, including gold at the 2022 Winter Olympics in the mixed team event. He also won the 2016 Four Hills Tournament, 2016 Ski Flying World Championships, and three consecutive Ski Flying World Cup overall titles (2014, 2015, and 2016). In addition, Prevc won two team events with the Slovenia national team at the Ski Flying World Championships, in 2022 and 2024.

A specialist in ski flying, Prevc is a former world record holder and the first athlete in history to land a jump of 250 metres (820 ft). In 2015, in Planica, Prevc became one of the few ski jumpers in history to achieve a "perfect jump", with all five judges awarding him the maximum style points of 20. In the following year, Prevc achieved the most individual World Cup competition wins in a single season – 15 – which is also a record.

Prevc was named Slovenian Sportsman of the Year for four consecutive years between 2013 and 2016. In March 2016, he was voted Athlete of the Month by the United States Sports Academy and also ranked third in the Athlete of the Year voting for 2016.

== Early and personal life ==
Prevc was born in Kranj to Božidar and Julijana Prevc; the family has since been living in the village of Dolenja Vas. He is the oldest of five children, having two younger brothers and two younger sisters. Both of his brothers, Domen and Cene, and one of his sisters, Nika, are also FIS Ski Jumping World Cup jumpers. His youngest sister, Ema, does not ski jump, and instead practices ballet. His father owns a furniture business and is also an international ski jumping referee. When he was younger, he practiced cross-country skiing and also tried ski jumping. His mother is a librarian.

Prevc attended the first half of his elementary school education in Selca, the second half in Železniki, and gymnasium in Kranj. At the age of nine, Prevc started training in ski jumping at the Bregarca K25 hill, located in Dolenja Vas. At the Junior World Ski Championships in February 2009, he finished 6th in the individual and 5th in the team event.

Prevc is married to Mina Lavtižar. They have two sons, Ludvik (born 2018) and Oskar (born 2021).

== Professional career ==
=== 2009–10 to 2012–13: World Cup debut and early seasons ===
Prevc made his World Cup debut in the 2009–10 season, finishing 22nd in Lillehammer, Norway, on 5 December 2009. In January 2010, at the Junior World Championships, Prevc won silver at the individual and bronze at the team event.

In February 2010, he was a member of the Slovenian team at the 2010 Winter Olympics in Vancouver, where he finished 7th in the individual normal hill and 16th in the individual large hill. Together with Robert Kranjec, Primož Pikl, and Mitja Mežnar, Prevc finished 8th in the team large hill event. He finished the World Cup season in the 35th place in the overall standings.

In the 2010–11 season, Prevc first participated at the FIS Nordic World Ski Championships 2011 in Oslo. Together with Kranjec, Jernej Damjan, and Jurij Tepeš, he won a bronze medal at the team large hill. At the end of the year, the ski jumping team was voted the Slovenian Sports Team of the Year by the Association of Slovene sports journalists.

In March 2011, Prevc made his ski flying debut in Planica. In the sky flying team event, Prevc won his first World Cup podium, third place. In the overall standings, he finished the season in 24th place.

In the 2011–12 season, Prevc recorded four top 10 finishes. In February, Prevc was a member of the team that won the first-ever World Cup team victory for Slovenia at the ski flying team event in Oberstdorf, together with Kranjec, Tepeš, and Jure Šinkovec. Prevc jumped 225.5 meters (which would equal the hill record) in the one-series event but fell hard after the landing and injured his shoulder. He needed surgery which meant he had to finish the season early and also missed out the Ski Flying World Championships in Vikersund. Although he missed the last five events of the season, Prevc finished 15th in the overall standings.

In the 2012–13 season, Prevc won three World Cup team events in Zakopane, Willingen, and Planica. At the FIS Nordic World Ski Championships 2013 in Val di Fiemme, Prevc won a silver medal at the individual large hill event and a bronze medal at the individual normal hill event.

At the season's last two events in Planica, Prevc reached his first two individual World Cup podiums, a second and a third place. He finished the season 7th in the overall standings. At the end of the year, Prevc was voted the Slovenian Sportsman of the Year for the first time.

=== 2013–14 and 2014–15: The runner-up ===
In the 2013–14 season, Prevc recorded his first individual World Cup win in Kulm. Prevc won the season's ski flying title with second place at the same venue since there were only two scheduled ski flying events. He went on to win in Sapporo, which brought him to the top of the World Cup overall standings for the first time in his career, where he remained for the next couple of events.

At the end of the season, he finished second in the overall rankings after Kamil Stoch of Poland. Prevc also won the last world cup event of the season in Planica, accumulating three wins and eleven podiums in total, which was his most successful season until then.

At the 2014 Winter Olympics in Sochi, Russia, Prevc won a silver medal at the normal hill event and a bronze medal at the large hill event. At the FIS Ski Flying World Championships 2014, he took bronze after the last two out of four jumps were cancelled.

The 2014–15 season was very successful for Prevc, with three wins and eleven more podiums in the World Cup. In addition, he won two team events and one third place with the Slovenian team. On 14 February 2015, Prevc set a new ski flying world record in Vikersund with a 250 m (820 ft) jump; this record was beaten the following day with a 251.5 metres (825 ft) jump by Anders Fannemel. On 20 March in Planica, Prevc achieved a "perfect jump" with all style referees awarding him maximum 20 points. At the same event, he also set a new hill record with 248.5 m. Prevc spent a couple of weeks at the top of the standings during the season. In the end, he had the same number of points as Severin Freund of Germany, but the overall title went to Freund because of the higher number of victories during the season (9 for Freund and 3 for Prevc). Prevc defended the ski flying title.

At the 2015 World Championships, Prevc finished fourth on the large hill, thirteenth on the normal hill, and sixth with the Slovenian team at the team event. Prevc took two third places at the 2014–15 Four Hills Tournament, which secured him a third place in the overall tournament standing.

=== 2015–16: The record-breaking season ===
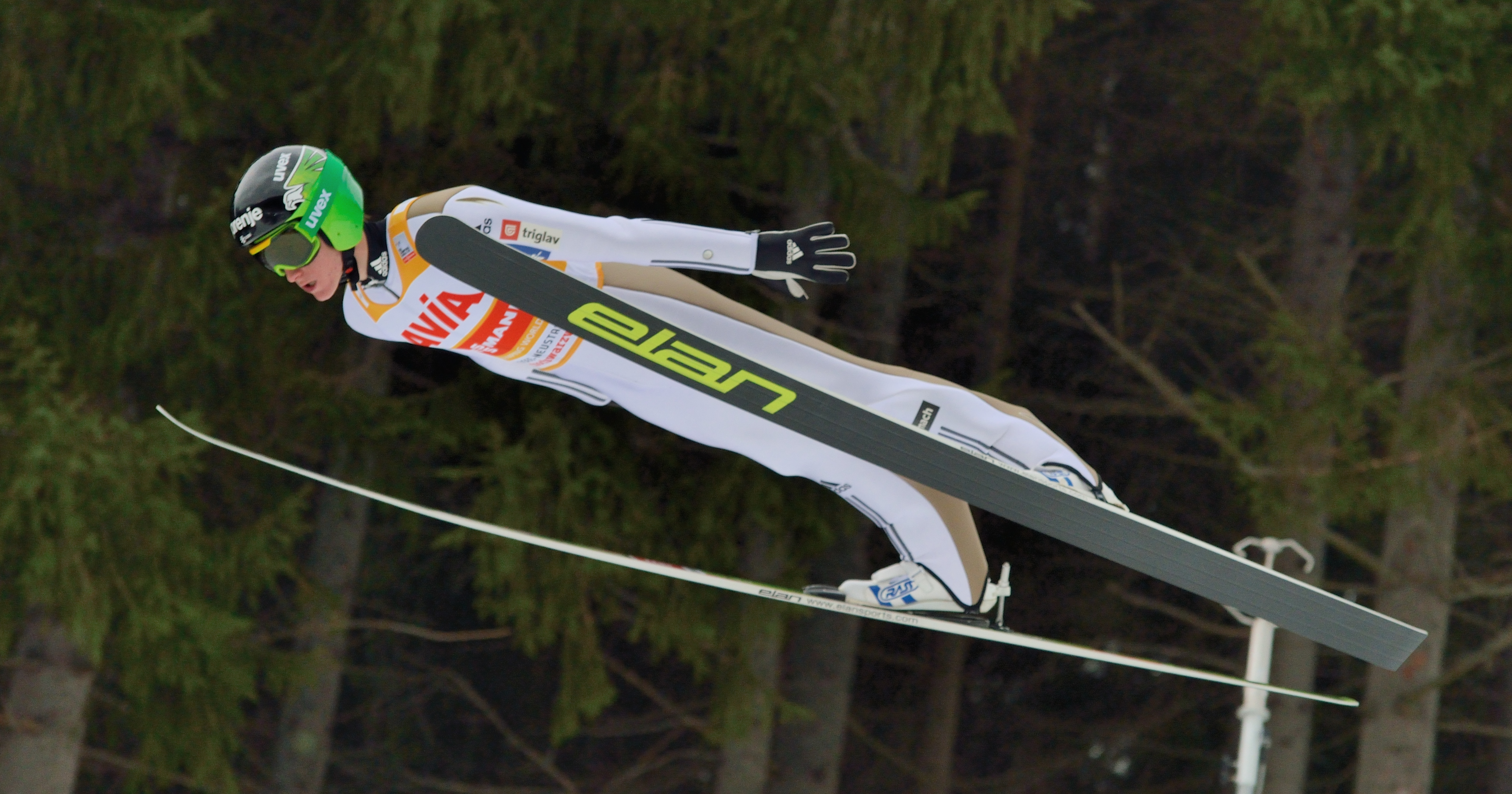
Prevc taking flight in Titisee-Neustadt, 2016

In the 2015–16 season, Prevc won 15 out of 29 World Cup events, the Four Hills Tournament, and the overall and ski flying titles.

On 19 December in Engelberg, Peter and his younger brother Domen Prevc both finished on the podium as the first pair of brothers in World Cup history. With three wins and one third place, Prevc won the 2016 Four Hills Tournament, thus becoming the second Slovenian ski jumper to win the Tournament after Primož Peterka in the 1996–97 season.

On 16 January at the Ski Flying World Championships in Kulm, Prevc became the ski flying world champion. The event consisted of three rounds, as the fourth round was cancelled because of strong wind. He set two hill records during the competition.

On 14 February in Vikersund, Prevc won the event despite sliding upon landing (he remained on his feet nevertheless), which rarely happens in ski jumping. By winning the second event in Almaty on 28 February, Prevc secured his first World Cup title, six events before the end of the season. At the end of the season, Prevc broke several statistical records. He won the highest number of points, victories, and podium finishes in a single season (2303 points, 15 victories, and 22 podiums in total, the previous records being 2083 points, 13 victories, and 20 podiums by Gregor Schlierenzauer from the 2008–09 season). Other records include the point difference between the first and the second in the overall standings (813), the best average of points per event (79.4), and the highest number of points in the Four Hills Tournament (1139.4). By winning the ski flying title, Prevc became the first ski jumper to win the title for three years in a row.

=== 2016–17 ===
At the first event of the 2016–17 season in Ruka, Finland, Prevc, who was leading after the first series, fell upon landing in the second series and finished third. His brother Domen scored his first World Cup victory on that occasion. Throughout December, Prevc was struggling with his jumps, fell again upon landing at the first event in Engelberg and did not reach the final round at the second event. After the Four Hill Tournament, where he finished 14th, Prevc skipped the events in Wisla. Following the break, his results started to improve again. Prevc was the best individual in the team event in Zakopane, where the Slovenian team finished third. The team event in Willingen saw, for the first time, all three Prevc brothers representing Slovenia; together with Tepeš, they finished fourth. On 11 February, he won his only event of the season in Sapporo; it was a double win with Maciej Kot. Prevc's best result at the World Championships was a fourth place in the mixed event. He collected five more top 10 World Cup finishes by the end of the season. He finished 9th in the overall and 5th both in the sky flying and in the inaugural Raw Air standings.

== Major tournament results ==
=== Winter Olympics ===
Year	Place	Individual		Team	
Year	Place	Normal	Large	Men	Mixed
2010	(Canada) Vancouver	7	16	8	N/A
2014	(Russia) Sochi	2nd place, silver medalist(s)	3rd place, bronze medalist(s)	5	N/A
2018	(South Korea) Pyeongchang	12	10	5	N/A
2022	(China) Beijing	4	10	2nd place, silver medalist(s)	1st place, gold medalist(s)

=== FIS Nordic World Ski Championships ===
Year	Place	Individual		Team	
Year	Place	Normal	Large	Men	Mixed
2011	(Norway) Oslo	17	25	3rd place, bronze medalist(s)	6
2013	(Italy) Val di Fiemme	3rd place, bronze medalist(s)	2nd place, silver medalist(s)	6	8
2015	(Sweden) Falun	13	4	6	5
2017	(Finland) Lahti	11	9	5	4
2019	(Austria) Seefeld	24	16	6	4
2021	(Germany) Oberstdorf	—	16	5	—

=== FIS Ski Flying World Championships ===
Year	Place	Individual	Team
2014	(Czech Republic) Harrachov	3rd place, bronze medalist(s)	N/A
2016	(Austria) Bad Mitterndorf	1st place, gold medalist(s)	4
2018	(Germany) Oberstdorf	6	2nd place, silver medalist(s)
2020	(Slovenia) Planica	—	4
2022	(Norway) Vikersund	4	1st place, gold medalist(s)
2024	(Austria) Bad Mitterndorf	26	1st place, gold medalist(s)

== World Cup results ==
=== Standings ===
Season	Overall	4H	SF	RA	NT
2009–10	35	41	—	N/A	10
2010–11	24	13	36	N/A	N/A
2011–12	15	20	18	N/A	N/A
2012–13	7	8	5	N/A	N/A
2013–14	2nd place, silver medalist(s)	4	1st place, gold medalist(s)	N/A	N/A
2014–15	2nd place, silver medalist(s)	3rd place, bronze medalist(s)	1st place, gold medalist(s)	N/A	N/A
2015–16	1st place, gold medalist(s)	1st place, gold medalist(s)	1st place, gold medalist(s)	N/A	N/A
2016–17	9	14	5	5	N/A
2017–18	15	21	8	10	N/A
2018–19	29	46	25	12	N/A
2019–20	8	8	28	7	N/A
2020–21	23	9	15	N/A	N/A
2021–22	15	20	4	—	N/A
2022–23	25	19	49	—	N/A
2023–24	5	18	3rd place, bronze medalist(s)	2nd place, silver medalist(s)	N/A

=== Individual wins ===
No.	Season	Date	Location	Hill	Size
1	2013–14	12 January 2014	(Austria) Tauplitz/Bad Mitterndorf	Kulm HS200	FH
2	2013–14	25 January 2014	(Japan) Sapporo	Ōkurayama HS134	LH
3	2013–14	23 March 2014	(Slovenia) Planica	Bloudkova velikanka HS139	LH
4	2014–15	24 January 2015	(Japan) Sapporo	Ōkurayama HS134	LH
5	2014–15	14 February 2015	(Norway) Vikersund	Vikersundbakken HS225	FH
6	2014–15	20 March 2015	(Slovenia) Planica	Letalnica bratov Gorišek HS225	FH
7	2015–16	13 December 2015	(Russia) Nizhny Tagil	Tramplin Stork HS134	LH
8	2015–16	19 December 2015	(Switzerland) Engelberg	Gross-Titlis-Schanze HS137	LH
9	2015–16	20 December 2015	(Switzerland) Engelberg	Gross-Titlis-Schanze HS137	LH
10	2015–16	1 January 2016	(Germany) Garmisch-Partenkirchen	Große Olympiaschanze HS140	LH
11	2015–16	3 January 2016	(Austria) Innsbruck	Bergiselschanze HS130	LH
12	2015–16	6 January 2016	(Austria) Bischofshofen	Paul-Ausserleitner-Schanze HS140	LH
13	2015–16	10 January 2016	(Germany) Willingen	Mühlenkopfschanze HS145	LH
14	2015–16	30 January 2016	(Japan) Sapporo	Ōkurayama HS134	LH
15	2015–16	10 February 2016	(Norway) Trondheim	Granåsen HS140	LH
16	2015–16	13 February 2016	(Norway) Vikersund	Vikersundbakken HS225	FH
17	2015–16	14 February 2016	(Norway) Vikersund	Vikersundbakken HS225	FH
18	2015–16	27 February 2016	(Kazakhstan) Almaty	Sunkar HS140	LH
19	2015–16	28 February 2016	(Kazakhstan) Almaty	Sunkar HS140	LH
20	2015–16	17 March 2016	(Slovenia) Planica	Letalnica bratov Gorišek HS225	FH
21	2015–16	20 March 2016	(Slovenia) Planica	Letalnica bratov Gorišek HS225	FH
22	2016–17	11 February 2017	(Japan) Sapporo	Ōkurayama HS137	LH
23	2019–20	9 March 2020	(Norway) Lillehammer	Lysgårdsbakken HS140	LH
24	2023–24	22 March 2024	(Slovenia) Planica	Letalnica bratov Gorišek HS240	FH

=== Individual starts ===
winner (1); second (2); third (3); did not compete (–); failed to qualify (q)
Season	1	2	3	4	5	6	7	8	9	10	11	12	13	14	15	16	17	18	19	20	21	22	23	24	25	26	27	28	29	30	31	32	Points
2009–10	Ruka	Lillehammer	Lillehammer	Engelberg	Engelberg	Engelberg	Oberstdorf	Garmisch-Partenkirchen	Innsbruck	Bischofshofen	Bad Mitterndorf	Bad Mitterndorf	Sapporo	Sapporo	Zakopane	Zakopane	Oberstdorf	Klingenthal	Willingen	Lahti	Kuopio	Lillehammer	Oslo										106
2009–10	–	22	31	q	26	27	32	28	36	q	–	–	–	–	14	26	–	–	–	17	14	19	14										106
2010–11	Ruka	Kuopio	Lillehammer	Lillehammer	Engelberg	Engelberg	Engelberg	Oberstdorf	Garmisch-Partenkirchen	Innsbruck	Bischofshofen	Harrachov	Harrachov	Sapporo	Sapporo	Zakopane	Zakopane	Zakopane	Willingen	Klingenthal	Oberstdorf	Vikersund	Vikersund	Lahti	Planica	Planica							218
2010–11	12	25	32	31	32	39	17	12	27	11	18	–	–	–	–	23	11	12	18	24	q	–	–	16	21	17							218
2011–12	Ruka	Lillehammer	Lillehammer	Harrachov	Harrachov	Engelberg	Engelberg	Oberstdorf	Garmisch-Partenkirchen	Innsbruck	Bischofshofen	Bad Mitterndorf	Bad Mitterndorf	Zakopane	Zakopane	Sapporo	Sapporo	Predazzo	Predazzo	Willingen	Oberstdorf	Lahti	Trondheim	Oslo	Planica	Planica							400
2011–12	16	24	23	14	21	42	20	31	19	11	20	21	13	4	6	35	7	13	10	4	8	–	–	–	–	–							400
2012–13	Lillehammer	Lillehammer	Ruka	Krasnaja Polana	Krasnaja Polana	Engelberg	Engelberg	Oberstdorf	Garmisch-Partenkirchen	Innsbruck	Bischofshofen	Wisła	Zakopane	Sapporo	Sapporo	Vikersund	Vikersund	Harrachov	Harrachov	Klingenthal	Oberstdorf	Lahti	Kuopio	Trondheim	Oslo	Planica	Planica						744
2012–13	10	9	15	13	q	14	6	18	10	5	15	26	11	15	9	26	5	5	20	7	4	18	13	6	15	2	3						744
2013–14	Klingenthal	Ruka	Lillehammer	Lillehammer	Titisee-Neustadt	Titisee-Neustadt	Engelberg	Engelberg	Oberstdorf	Garmisch-Partenkirchen	Innsbruck	Bischofshofen	Tauplitz	Tauplitz	Wisła	Zakopane	Sapporo	Sapporo	Willingen	Willingen	Falun	Lahti	Lahti	Kuopio	Trondheim	Oslo	Planica	Planica					1,312
2013–14	21	12	23	14	27	11	15	8	3	18	6	2	2	1	5	2	1	2	7	3	2	4	6	4	45	11	3	1					1,312
2014–15	Klingenthal	Ruka	Ruka	Lillehammer	Lillehammer	Nizhny Tagil	Nizhny Tagil	Engelberg	Engelberg	Oberstdorf	Garmisch-Partenkirchen	Innsbruck	Bischofshofen	Tauplitz	Wisła	Zakopane	Sapporo	Sapporo	Willingen	Willingen	Titisee-Neustadt	Titisee-Neustadt	Vikersund	Vikersund	Lahti	Kuopio	Trondheim	Oslo	Oslo	Planica	Planica		1,729
2014–15	5	9	4	5	2	5	9	5	12	3	3	11	4	4	2	4	1	3	2	4	3	7	1	16	4	17	2	2	3	1	2		1,729
2015–16	Klingenthal	Lillehammer	Lillehammer	Nizhny Tagil	Nizhny Tagil	Engelberg	Engelberg	Oberstdorf	Garmisch-Partenkirchen	Innsbruck	Bischofshofen	Willingen	Zakopane	Sapporo	Sapporo	Trondheim	Vikersund	Vikersund	Vikersund	Lahti	Lahti	Kuopio	Almaty	Almaty	Wisła	Titisee-Neustadt	Planica	Planica	Planica				2,303
2015–16	2	11	2	2	1	1	1	3	1	1	1	1	3	1	6	1	4	1	1	5	9	4	1	1	5	2	1	2	1				2,303
2016–17	Ruka	Ruka	Klingenthal	Lillehammer	Lillehammer	Engelberg	Engelberg	Oberstdorf	Garmisch-Partenkirchen	Innsbruck	Bischofshofen	Wisła	Wisła	Zakopane	Willingen	Oberstdorf	Oberstdorf	Sapporo	Sapporo	Pyeongchang	Pyeongchang	Oslo	Trondheim	Vikersund	Planica	Planica							716
2016–17	3	7	22	30	9	26	33	10	11	19	23	–	–	13	9	6	4	1	6	13	4	16	7	6	10	6							716
2017–18	Wisła	Ruka	Nizhny Tagil	Nizhny Tagil	Titisee-Neustadt	Engelberg	Engelberg	Oberstdorf	Garmisch-Partenkirchen	Innsbruck	Bischofshofen	Tauplitz	Zakopane	Willingen	Willingen	Lahti	Oslo	Lillehammer	Trondheim	Vikersund	Planica	Planica											416
2017–18	20	23	13	40	15	16	14	41	8	23	8	6	3	20	20	–	46	7	8	14	15	8											416
2018–19	Wisła	Ruka	Ruka	Nizhny Tagil	Nizhny Tagil	Engelberg	Engelberg	Oberstdorf	Garmisch-Partenkirchen	Innsbruck	Bischofshofen	Val di Fiemme	Val di Fiemme	Zakopane	Sapporo	Sapporo	Oberstdorf	Oberstdorf	Oberstdorf	Lahti	Willingen	Willingen	Oslo	Lillehammer	Trondheim	Vikersund	Planica	Planica					179
2018–19	–	–	–	–	–	35	16	18	q	–	–	40	53	–	–	–	–	–	–	q	20	40	3	26	12	16	10	19					179
2019–20	Wisła	Ruka	Nizhny Tagil	Nizhny Tagil	Klingenthal	Engelberg	Engelberg	Oberstdorf	Garmisch-Partenkirchen	Innsbruck	Bischofshofen	Val di Fiemme	Val di Fiemme	Titisee-Neustadt	Titisee-Neustadt	Zakopane	Sapporo	Sapporo	Willingen	Tauplitz	Tauplitz	Râșnov	Râșnov	Lahti	Lahti	Oslo	Lillehammer						789
2019–20	15	28	8	8	8	12	2	21	12	9	5	17	7	22	18	10	7	4	8	33	20	4	16	18	15	1	5						789
2020–21	Wisła	Ruka	Ruka	Nizhny Tagil	Nizhny Tagil	Engelberg	Engelberg	Oberstdorf	Garmisch-Partenkirchen	Innsbruck	Bischofshofen	Titisee-Neustadt	Titisee-Neustadt	Zakopane	Lahti	Willingen	Willingen	Klingenthal	Klingenthal	Szczyrk	Szczyrk	Râșnov	Planica	Planica	Planica								230
2020–21	30	29	18	36	13	14	33	17	13	11	12	21	13	31	12	–	–	–	–	–	–	–	19	11	23								230
2021–22	Nizhny Tagil	Nizhny Tagil	Ruka	Ruka	Wisła	Klingenthal	Klingenthal	Engelberg	Engelberg	Oberstdorf	Garmisch-Partenkirchen	Bischofshofen	Bischofshofen	Bischofshofen	Zakopane	Titisee-Neustadt	Titisee-Neustadt	Willingen	Willingen	Lahti	Lahti	Lillehammer	Oslo	Oslo	Oberstdorf	Oberstdorf	Planica	Planica					460
2021–22	–	–	11	6	21	25	41	25	29	19	38	28	21	16	13	12	8	16	20	8	25	–	–	–	8	12	2	3					460
2022–23	Wisła	Wisła	Ruka	Ruka	Titisee-Neustadt	Titisee-Neustadt	Engelberg	Engelberg	Oberstdorf	Garmisch-Partenkirchen	Innsbruck	Bischofshofen	Zakopane	Sapporo	Sapporo	Sapporo	Tauplitz	Tauplitz	Willingen	Willingen	Lake Placid	Lake Placid	Râșnov	Oslo	Oslo	Lillehammer	Lillehammer	Vikersund	Vikersund	Lahti	Planica	Planica	274
2022–23	17	16	13	15	33	14	26	13	22	39	14	7	17	15	13	6	38	29	31	20	31	46	–	–	–	–	–	–	–	–	–	–	274
2023–24	Ruka	Ruka	Lillehammer	Lillehammer	Klingenthal	Klingenthal	Engelberg	Engelberg	Oberstdorf	Garmisch-Partenkirchen	Innsbruck	Bischofshofen	Wisła	Zakopane	Willingen	Willingen	Lake Placid	Lake Placid	Sapporo	Sapporo	Oberstdorf	Oberstdorf	Lahti	Lahti	Oslo	Oslo	Trondheim	Trondheim	Vikersund	Vikersund	Planica	Planica	1,071
2023–24	13	6	19	10	12	11	16	15	9	9	31	9	5	20	20	13	–	–	9	8	2	2	14	2	8	11	2	5	8	4	1	6	1,071

== Awards and nominations ==
Year	Category	Voted by	Result
2013	Slovenian Sportsman of the Year	Slovene sports journalists association	Won
2014	Slovenian Sportsman of the Year	Slovene sports journalists association	Won
2015	Slovenian Sportsman of the Year	Slovene sports journalists association	Won
2016	Athlete of the Month for March	United States Sports Academy	Won
2016	Slovenian Sportsman of the Year	Slovene sports journalists association	Won
2016	European Sportsperson of the Year	European Alliance of News Agencies	16th
2016	Athlete of the Year	United States Sports Academy	3rd

Records
Preceded by Johan Remen Evensen; 246.5 m (809 ft)	World's longest ski jump 250 m (820 ft); 14 February 2015 – 15 February 2015	Succeeded by Anders Fannemel; 251.5 m (825 ft)
