= Gorniy Gigant District =

District of Almaty, Kazakhstan

Coordinates: 43°12′54″N 76°57′0″E

Gorniy Gigant District (or Gorny Gigant; Russian: Горный Гигант, lit. 'Mountain Giant') is a district of Almaty, Kazakhstan. One of the most notable aspects of the Gorniy Gigant District is the Sunkar International Ski Jumping Complex. The ski resort was built in 2010 and is located 900 meters above sea level. The area is also a tourist destination on account of its natural scenery, architecture, walking routes, and cafes (uzbechkas). Gorniy Gigant District also includes rural dachas, summer homes, and residential apartments. The area is fenced, and comprises 14 hectares.

== See also ==
- Sunkar International Ski Jumping Complex
