= Tramplin Stork =

Ski jumping arena in Nizhniy Tagil, Russia

Coordinates: 57.8927°N 59.8671°E

- Aist
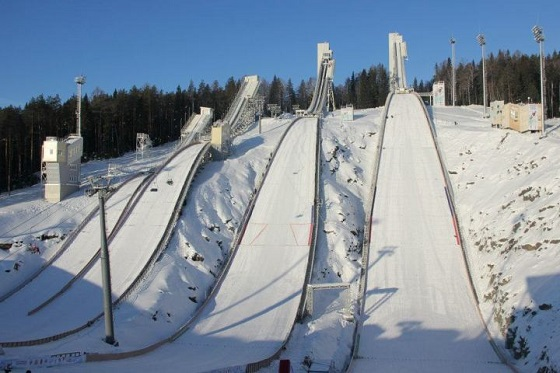
- Location: Nizhniy Tagil, Russia
- Opened: 1973
- Renovated: 2012

Size
- K–point: K90, 120
- Hill size: HS 96, 134
- Longest jump (unofficial / fall): 142.5 m (468 ft) (Slovenia) Anže Semenič (15 March 2015)
- Hill record: 142.5 m (468 ft) (Norway) Robert Johansson (5 December 2017); 102.5 m (336 ft) (Russia) Mikhail Maksimochkin (27 March 2014)

Tramplin Stork (nickname:Aist) is a ski jumping arena in Nizhniy Tagil, Russia. It is a venue in the FIS Ski jumping World Cup.

== Events ==
=== Men ===
Date	Hillsize	Competition	Winner	Second	Third
(night) 14 September 2013	HS100	SGP	(Norway) Anders Bardal	(Norway) Tom Hilde	(Czech Republic) Jakub Janda
15 September 2013	HS133	SGP	(Czech Republic) Jakub Janda	(Slovenia) Jernej Damjan	(Poland) Krzysztof Biegun
(night) 13 December 2015	HS134	WC	(Norway) Anders Fannemel	(Austria) Gregor Schlierenzauer	(Germany) Severin Freund
(night) 14 December 2014	HS134	WC	(Germany) Severin Freund	(Norway) Anders Fannemel	(Austria) Stefan Kraft
(night) 12 December 2013	HS134	WC	(Germany) Severin Freund	(Slovenia) Peter Prevc	(Norway) Joachim Hauer
(night) 13 December 2015	HS134	WC	(Slovenia) Peter Prevc	(Austria) Michael Hayböck	(Norway) Johann André Forfang
(night) 2 December 2017	HS134	WC	(Germany) Richard Freitag	(Norway) Daniel-André Tande	(Norway) Johann André Forfang
(night) 3 December 2020	HS134	WC	(Germany) Andreas Wellinger	(Germany) Richard Freitag	(Austria) Stefan Kraft

=== Ladies ===
Date	Hillsize	Competition	Winner	Second	Third
13 September 2013	HS100	SGP	(Japan) Sara Takanashi	(France) Coline Mattel	(Slovenia) Katja Požun
14 September 2013	HS100	SGP	(Japan) Sara Takanashi	(France) Coline Mattel	(Germany) Katharina Althaus
12 December 2012	HS97	WC	(Austria) Daniela Iraschko-Stolz	(Japan) Sara Takanashi	(Austria) Eva Pinkelnig
13 December 2015	HS97	WC	(Japan) Sara Takanashi	(Japan) Yuki Ito	(Austria) Chiara Hölzl
