= Maja Vtič =

Slovenian ski jumper (born 1988)

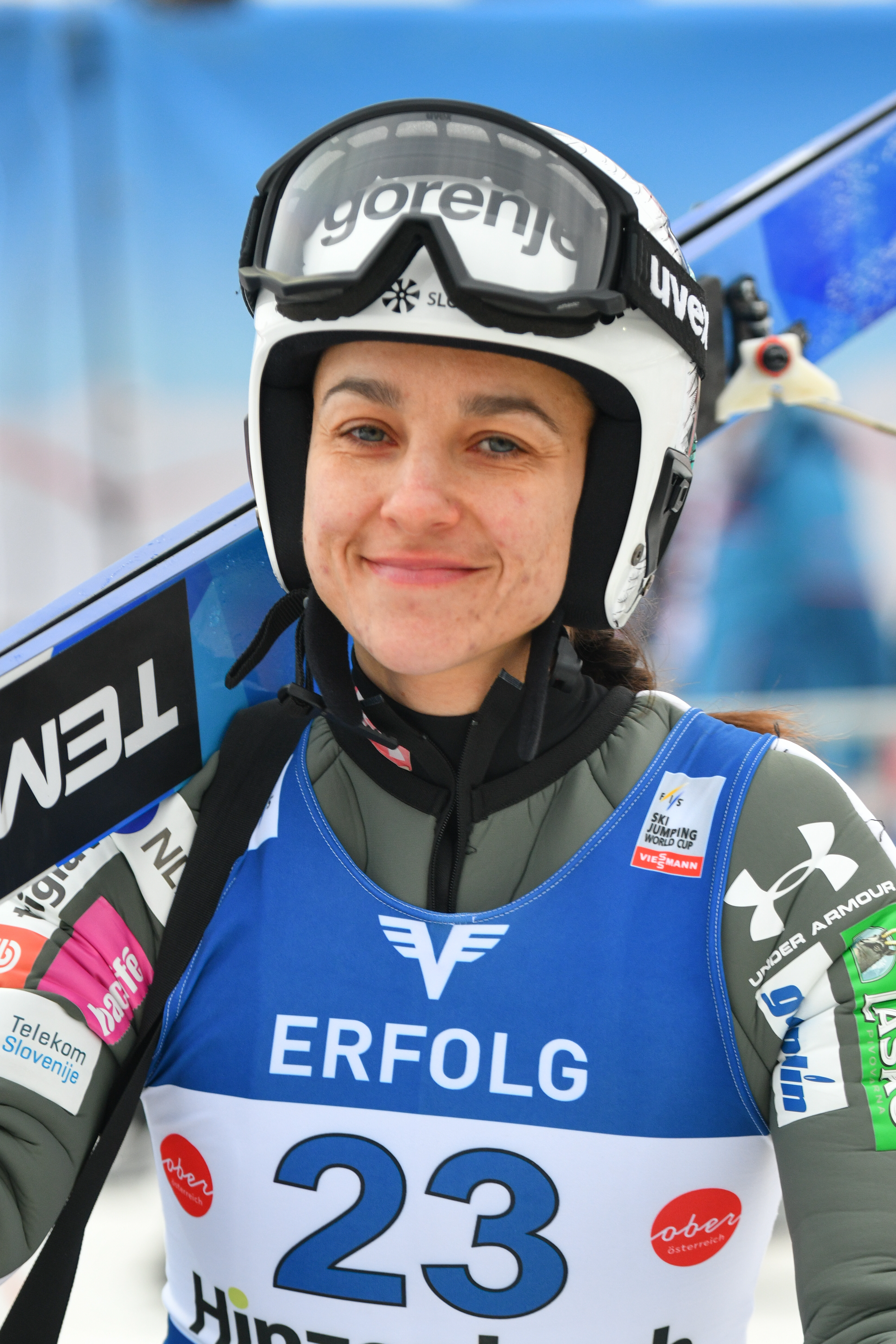
- Vtič in 2023

Personal information
- Born: 27 January 1988 (age 38) Novo Mesto, SFR Yugoslavia
- Height: 1.67 m (5 ft 6 in)

Sport
- Sport: Ski jumping

World Cup career
- Seasons: 2012–2023
- Indiv. starts: 158
- Indiv. podiums: 8
- Indiv. wins: 1
- Team starts: 4
- Team podiums: 1

Maja Vtič (born 27 January 1988) is a Slovenian retired ski jumper.

== Career ==
In 2007, Vtič won bronze at the FIS Nordic Junior World Ski Championships in Tarvisio, Italy. She placed fifth at the 2011 World Championship in Oslo. In January 2011, Vtič won the Slovenian national ski jumping competition.

== Personal life ==
Vtič lives in Mirna.

== World Cup ==
=== Standings ===
Season	Position	Points
2011–12	12	272
2012–13	16	244
2013–14	6	542
2014–15	8	418
2015–16	3	908
2016–17	11	477
2017–18	37	34
2018–19	35	75
2019–20	50	2
2021–22	37	61
2022–23	31	121

=== Individual wins ===
No.	Season	Date	Location	Hill	Size
1	2015–16	13 February 2016	(Slovenia) Ljubno ob Savinji	Savina Ski Jumping Center HS95	NH
