= Dolenja Vas, Železniki =

Dolenja Vas
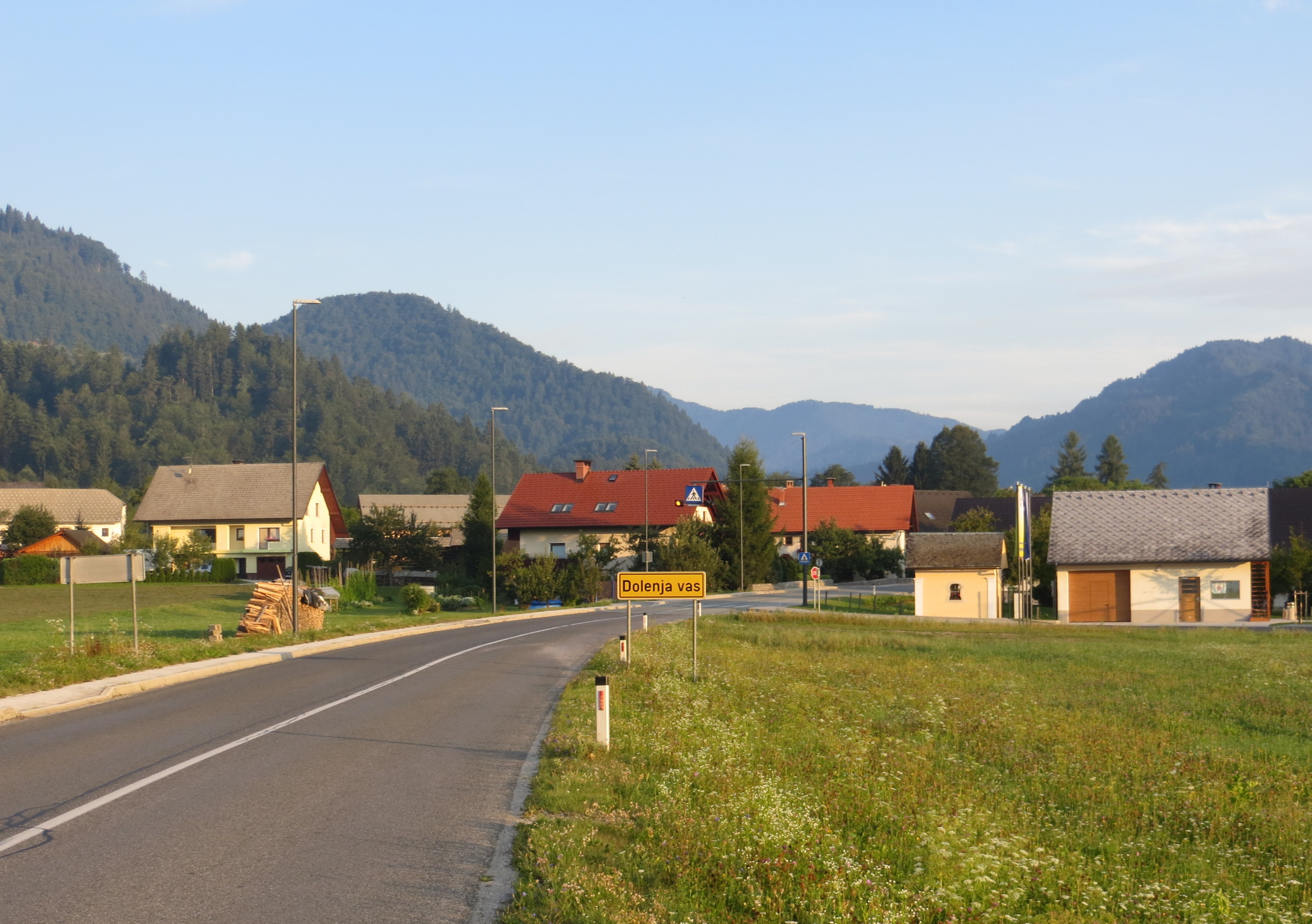

- Location in Slovenia
- Coordinates: 46°12′54.65″N 14°13′31.37″E
- Country: Slovenia
- Traditional Region: Upper Carniola
- Statistical region: Upper Carniola
- Municipality: Železniki

Area
  - Total: 4.454 km^{2} (1.720 sq mi)
- Elevation: 450.1 m (1,477 ft)

Population (2026)
  - Total: 480
  - Density: 108/km^{2} (280/sq mi)

Dolenja Vas (pronounced [dɔˈleːnja ˈʋaːs]; Slovene: Dolenja vas, German: Doleinawas) is a settlement in the Municipality of Železniki in the Upper Carniola region of Slovenia. In January 2026, the population was 480.
