= Johann André Forfang =

Norwegian ski jumper (born 1995)

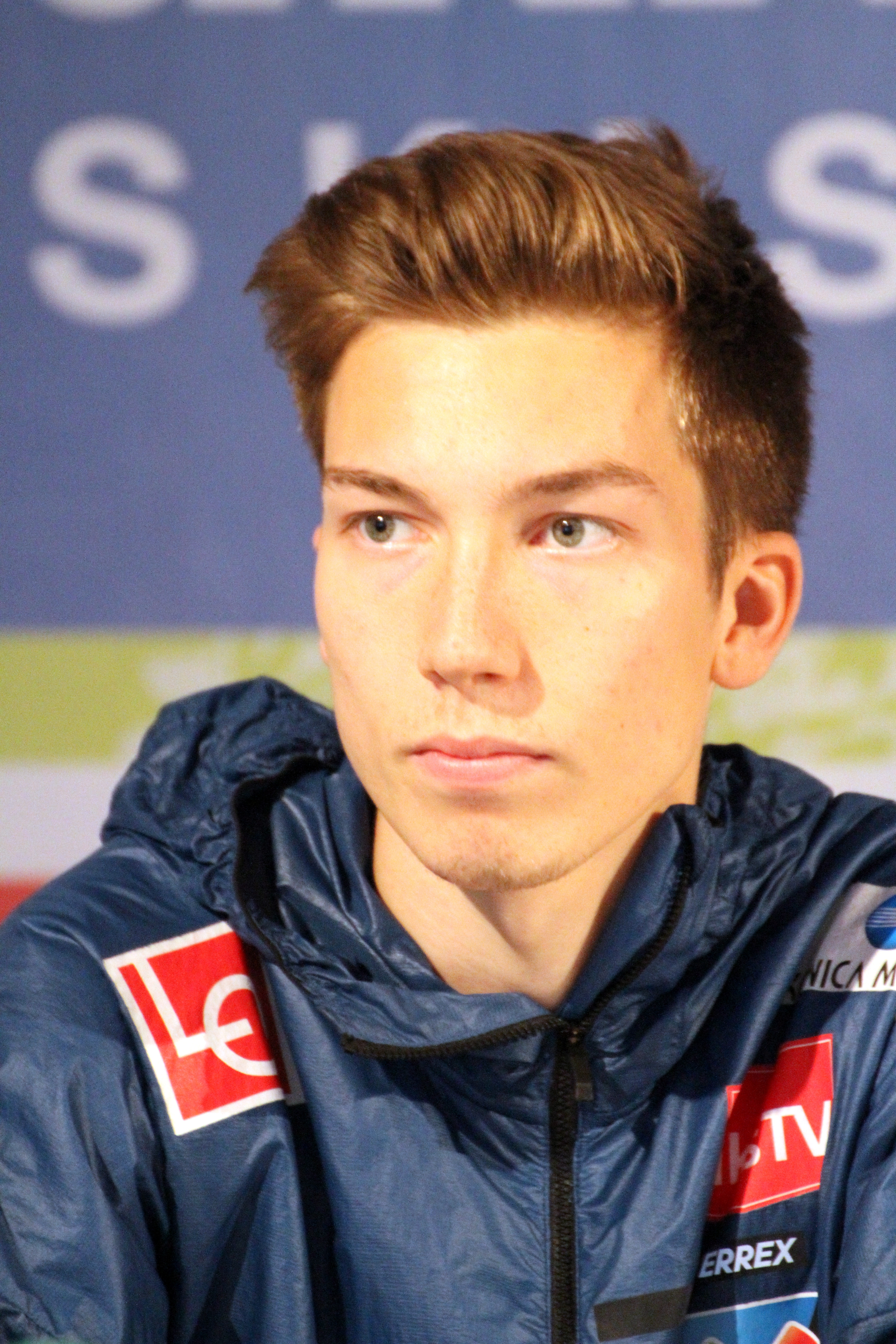
- Johann André Forfang during October 2017 FIS Ski Jumping Summer Grand Prix competitions in Klingenthal, Saxony, Germany

Personal information
- Nationality: Norway
- Born: 4 July 1995 (age 31) Tromsø, Norway
- Height: 1.78 m (5 ft 10 in)

Sport
- Sport: Skiing
- Club: Tromsø SK

World Cup career
- Seasons: 2015–present
- Indiv. starts: 266
- Indiv. podiums: 24
- Indiv. wins: 6
- Team starts: 46
- Team podiums: 28
- Team wins: 14

Achievements and titles
- Personal bests: 246 m (807 ft); Planica, 28 March 2026
Medal record
Representing Norway
Men's ski jumping
Olympic Games
Gold medal – first place	2018 Pyeongchang	Team LH
Silver medal – second place	2018 Pyeongchang	Individual NH
Bronze medal – third place	2026 Milano Cortina	Super team LH
World Championships
Gold medal – first place	2025 Trondheim	Mixed team LH
Silver medal – second place	2017 Lahti	Team LH
Silver medal – second place	2023 Planica	Team LH
Silver medal – second place	2023 Planica	Mixed team NH
Bronze medal – third place	2025 Trondheim	Team LH
Men's ski flying
World Championships
Gold medal – first place	2016 Bad Mitterndorf	Team
Gold medal – first place	2018 Oberstdorf	Team
Gold medal – first place	2020 Planica	Team
Bronze medal – third place	2022 Vikersund	Team
Bronze medal – third place	2026 Oberstdorf	Team
- Updated on 16 February 2025

Johann André Forfang (born 4 July 1995) is a Norwegian ski jumper and three-time Olympic medalist, including gold at the 2018 men's large hill team event.

== Career ==
Like his older brother Daniel Forfang, he represents the club Tromsø SK. Forfang made his World Cup debut in December 2014. He won a team gold medal at the FIS Ski Flying World Championships 2016 with his teammates in Tauplitz/Bad Mitterndorf. His first individual World Cup victory was in Titisee-Neustadt on 12 March 2016. In 2018, he won the last World Cup event before the Olympic Games in Willingen. At the 2018 Olympic Games, he gained a silver medal in the normal hill event, and won the gold medal in the team event alongside his teammates Andreas Stjernen, Daniel-André Tande, and Robert Johansson. On 1 December 2018, he won the World Cup event in Nizhny Tagil.

=== FIS World Nordic Ski Championships ===
Event	Normal hill	Large hill	Team LH	Mixed Team NH
(Sweden) 2015 Falun	–	18	–	–
(Finland) 2017 Lahti	7	12	2nd place, silver medalist(s)	–
(Austria) 2019 Seefeld		7		

== World Cup ==
=== Standings ===
Season	Overall	4H	SF	RA	W6	T5	P7
2014/15	23	21	8	N/A	N/A	N/A	N/A
2015/16	5	6	3rd place, bronze medalist(s)	N/A	N/A	N/A	N/A
2016/17	27	—	15	6	N/A	N/A	N/A
2017/18	7	9	6	6	2nd place, silver medalist(s)	N/A	2nd place, silver medalist(s)
2018/19	8	16	9	5	11	N/A	9
2019/20	12	6	9	23	12	6	N/A
2020/21	19	19	11	N/A	35	N/A	13
2021/22	24	21	15	39	N/A	N/A	13
2022/23	16	15	13	11	N/A	N/A	10
2023/24	7	22	9	15	N/A	N/A	

=== Wins ===
No.	Season	Date	Location	Hill	Size
1	2015/16	12 March 2016	(Germany) Titisee-Neustadt	Hochfirstschanze HS142	LH
2	2017/18	4 February 2018	(Germany) Willingen	Mühlenkopfschanze HS145	LH
3	2018/19	1 December 2018	(Russia) Nizhny Tagil	Tramplin Stork HS134	LH
4	2023/24	3 February 2024	(Germany) Willingen	Mühlenkopfschanze HS147	LH
5	2023/24	9 March 2024	(Norway) Oslo	Holmenkollbakken HS134	LH
6	2024/25	8 February 2025	(United States) Lake Placid	MacKenzie Intervale HS128	LH

=== Individual starts (226) ===
Season	1	2	3	4	5	6	7	8	9	10	11	12	13	14	15	16	17	18	19	20	21	22	23	24	25	26	27	28	29	30	31	32	Points
2014/15	Klingenthal	Kuusamo	Kuusamo	Lillehammer	Lillehammer	Nizhny Tagil	Nizhny Tagil	Engelberg	Engelberg	Oberstdorf	Garmisch-Partenkirchen	Innsbruck	Bischofshofen	Tauplitz	Wisła	Zakopane	Sapporo	Sapporo	Willingen	Willingen	Titisee-Neustadt	Titisee-Neustadt	Vikersund	Vikersund	Lahti	Kuopio	Trondheim	Oslo	Oslo	Planica	Planica		325
2014/15	–	–	–	DQ	–	–	–	12	19	28	19	12	43	13	14	21	37	16	–	–	–	–	10	3	49	24	11	9	37	9	15		325
2015/16	Klingenthal	Lillehammer	Lillehammer	Nizhny Tagil	Nizhny Tagil	Engelberg	Engelberg	Oberstdorf	Garmisch-Partenkirchen	Innsbruck	Bischofshofen	Willingen	Zakopane	Sapporo	Sapporo	Trondheim	Vikersund	Vikersund	Vikersund	Lahti	Lahti	Kuopio	Almaty	Almaty	Wisła	Titisee-Neustadt	Planica	Planica	Planica				1240
2015/16	9	12	3	5	3	14	4	8	4	4	7	9	5	19	2	18	8	2	7	6	10	5	–	–	4	1	2	3	3				1240
2016/17	Kuusamo	Kuusamo	Klingenthal	Lillehammer	Lillehammer	Engelberg	Engelberg	Oberstdorf	Garmisch-Partenkirchen	Innsbruck	Bischofshofen	Wisła	Wisła	Zakopane	Willingen	Oberstdorf	Oberstdorf	Sapporo	Sapporo	Pyeongchang	Pyeongchang	Oslo	Trondheim	Vikersund	Planica	Planica							197
2016/17	24	46	43	33	q	–	–	–	–	–	–	32	6	42	26	–	–	–	–	–	–	10	6	4	q	9							197
2017/18	Wisła	Kuusamo	Nizhny Tagil	Nizhny Tagil	Titisee-Neustadt	Engelberg	Engelberg	Oberstdorf	Garmisch-Partenkirchen	Innsbruck	Bischofshofen	Tauplitz	Zakopane	Willingen	Willingen	Lahti	Oslo	Lillehammer	Trondheim	Vikersund	Planica	Planica											821
2017/18	18	2	3	15	7	31	4	7	9	19	13	30	6	7	1	10	5	6	6	9	2	8											821
2018/19	Wisła	Kuusamo	Kuusamo	Nizhny Tagil	Nizhny Tagil	Engelberg	Engelberg	Oberstdorf	Garmisch-Partenkirchen	Innsbruck	Bischofshofen	Val di Fiemme	Val di Fiemme	Zakopane	Sapporo	Sapporo	Oberstdorf	Oberstdorf	Oberstdorf	Lahti	Willingen	Willingen	Oslo	Lillehammer	Trondheim	Vikersund	Planica	Planica					892
2018/19	10	13	9	1	2	4	15	25	22	21	17	11	12	4	q	10	7	8	8	7	10	9	9	5	5	7	8	8					892
2019/20	Wisła	Kuusamo	Nizhny Tagil	Nizhny Tagil	Klingenthal	Engelberg	Engelberg	Oberstdorf	Garmisch-Partenkirchen	Innsbruck	Bischofshofen	Val di Fiemme	Val di Fiemme	Titisee-Neustadt	Titisee-Neustadt	Zakopane	Sapporo	Sapporo	Willingen	Tauplitz	Tauplitz	Râșnov	Râșnov	Lahti	Lahti	Oslo	Lillehammer						579
2019/20	16	DQ	13	14	7	6	12	15	9	7	11	9	6	4	13	16	34	22	6	16	7	14	10	36	16	21	48						579
2020/21	Wisła	Ruka	Ruka	Nizhny Tagil	Nizhny Tagil	Engelberg	Engelberg	Oberstdorf	Garmisch-Partenkirchen	Innsbruck	Bischofshofen	Titisee-Neustadt	Titisee-Neustadt	Zakopane	Lahti	Willingen	Willingen	Klingenthal	Klingenthal	Szczyrk	Szczyrk	Râșnov	Planica	Planica	Planica								338
2020/21	–	DQ	5	20	7	18	20	35	9	25	26	13	34	32	13	45	23	12	42	19	11	–	11	13	8								338
2021/22	Nizhny Tagil	Nizhny Tagil	Ruka	Ruka	Wisła	Klingenthal	Klingenthal	Engelberg	Engelberg	Oberstdorf	Garmisch-Partenkirchen	Bischofshofen	Bischofshofen	Bischofshofen	Zakopane	Titisee-Neustadt	Titisee-Neustadt	Willingen	Willingen	Lahti	Lahti	Lillehammer	Oslo	Oslo	Oberstdorf	Oberstdorf	Planica	Planica					182
2021/22	25	9	18	34	12	14	6	20	28	30	24	16	44	15	30	–	–	–	–	34	12	43	10	q									182
2022/23	Wisła	Wisła	Ruka	Ruka	Titisee-Neustadt	Titisee-Neustadt	Engelberg	Engelberg	Oberstdorf	Garmisch-Partenkirchen	Innsbruck	Bischofshofen	Zakopane	Sapporo	Sapporo	Sapporo	Bad Mitterndorf	Bad Mitterndorf	Willingen	Willingen	Lake Placid, New York	Lake Placid, New York	Râșnov	Oslo	Oslo	Lillehammer	Lillehammer	Vikersund	Vikersund	Lahti	Planica	Planica	574
2022/23	9	14	10	q	17	23	28	32	11	20	15	13	18	25	11	5	18	8	7	22	40	23	–	10	6	6	16	29	22	9	8	10	574
2023/24	Ruka	Ruka	Lillehammer	Lillehammer	Klingenthal	Klingenthal	Engelberg	Engelberg	Oberstdorf	Garmisch-Partenkirchen	Innsbruck	Bischofshofen	Wisła	Zakopane	Willingen	Willingen	Lake Placid, New York	Lake Placid, New York	Sapporo	Sapporo	Oberstdorf	Oberstdorf	Lahti	Oslo	Oslo	Trondheim	Trondheim	Vikersund	Vikersund	Planica	Planica		328
2023/24	33	26	17	20	9	15	6	13	12	28	19	32	11	8	1																		328
