= Kenneth Gangnes =

Norwegian former ski jumper (born 1989)

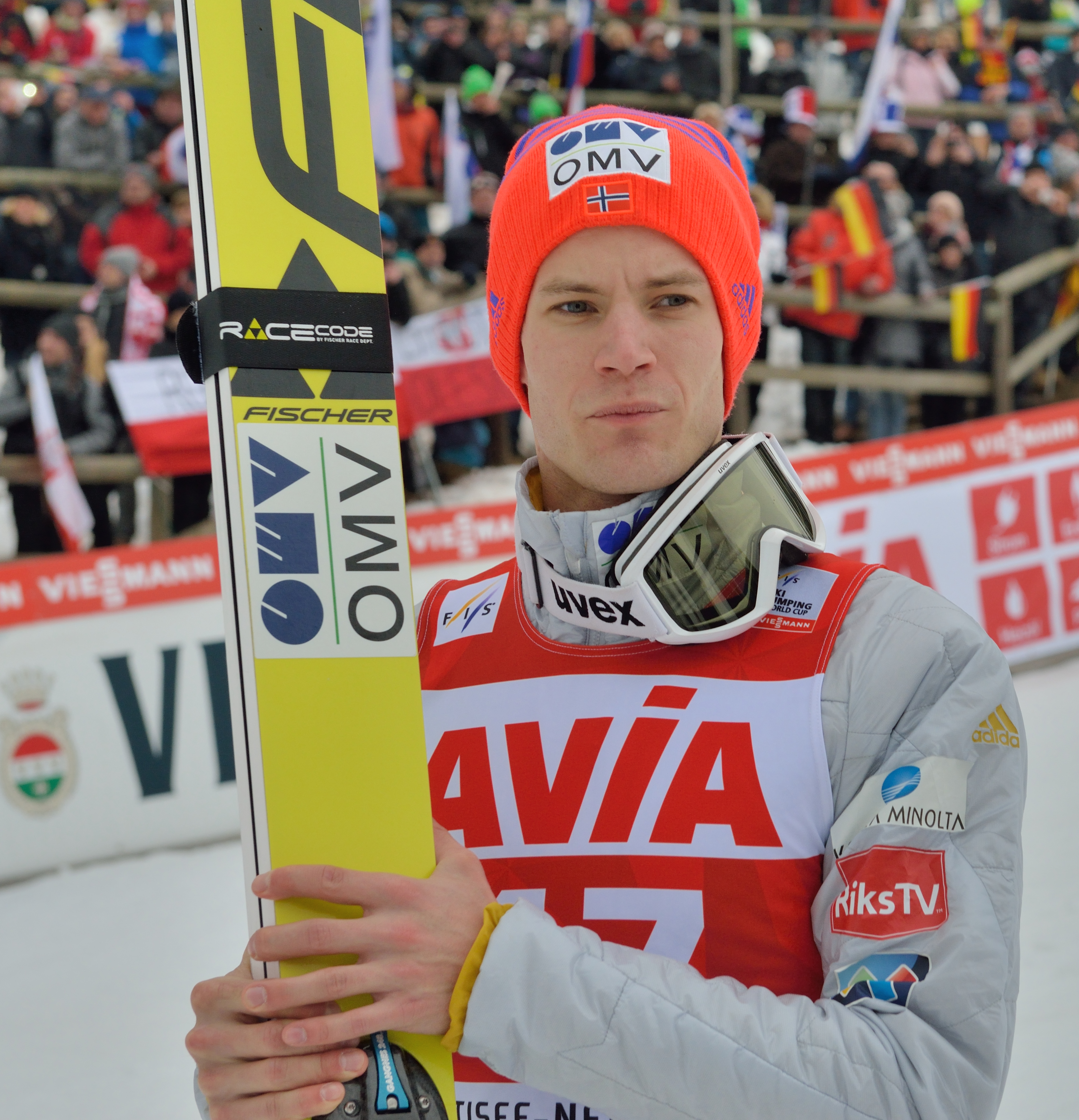
- Kenneth Gangnes during March 2016 World Cup competitions in Titisee-Neustadt, Baden-Württemberg, Germany

Personal information
- Nationality: Norway
- Born: 15 May 1989 (age 37) Gjøvik, Norway

Sport
- Sport: Skiing
- Club: IL Kolbukameratene

World Cup career
- Seasons: 2008–2012; 2015–2016
- Indiv. starts: 62
- Indiv. podiums: 9
- Indiv. wins: 1
- Team starts: 8
- Team podiums: 5
- Team wins: 3

Achievements and titles
- Personal bests: 248.5 m (815 ft); Vikersund, 14 February 2016
Medal record
Men's ski flying
FIS Ski Flying World Championships
Gold medal – first place	2016 Bad Mitterndorf	Team
Silver medal – second place	2016 Bad Mitterndorf	Individual
- Updated on 26 December 2018

Kenneth Gangnes (born 15 May 1989) is a Norwegian former ski jumper.

== Career ==
He debuted at the World Cup in March 2008 in Lillehammer, and won his first World Cup event in Lysgårdsbakken on 6 December 2015.

After his best season, which he ended with the 3rd place overall in the World Cup, he tore his ACL in his left knee, and missed the 2016–17 season.

He returned for the 2017 Summer Grand Prix, where he placed second in Hakuba on 26 August 2017.

In early November 2017, two weeks before the start of the season, he suffered another ACL torn and missed another season.

== World Cup ==
=== Standings ===
Season	Overall	4H	SF	RA	NT
2007/08	—	—	—	N/A	50
2008/09	—	—	—	N/A	—
2009/10	90	61	—	N/A	—
2010/11	78	—	—	N/A	N/A
2011/12	43	45	32	N/A	N/A
2014/15	41	—	19	N/A	N/A
2015/16	3	4	4	N/A	N/A

=== Wins ===
No.	Season	Date	Location	Hill	Size
1	2015/16	6 December 2015	(Norway) Lillehammer	Lysgårdsbakken HS100	NH

=== Individual starts (62) ===
did not compete (–); failed to qualify (q); disqualified (DQ)
Season	1	2	3	4	5	6	7	8	9	10	11	12	13	14	15	16	17	18	19	20	21	22	23	24	25	26	27	28	29	30	31	Points
2007/08	Kuusamo	Trondheim	Trondheim	Villach	Villach	Engelberg	Engelberg	Oberstdorf	Garmisch-Partenkirchen	Bischofshofen	Bischofshofen	Predazzo	Predazzo	Harrachov	Zakopane	Zakopane	Sapporo	Sapporo	Liberec	Liberec	Willingen	Kuopio	Kuopio	Lillehammer	Oslo	Planica	Planica					0
2007/08	–	–	–	–	–	–	–	–	–	–	–	–	–	–	–	–	–	–	–	–	–	–	–	37	48	–	–					0
2008/09	Kuusamo	Trondheim	Trondheim	Pragelato	Pragelato	Engelberg	Engelberg	Oberstdorf	Garmisch-Partenkirchen	Innsbruck	Bischofshofen	Tauplitz	Tauplitz	Zakopane	Zakopane	Whistler	Whistler	Sapporo	Willingen	Klingenthal	Oberstdorf	Lahti	Kuopio	Lillehammer	Vikersund	Planica	Planica					0
2008/09	40	44	–	–	–	–	–	–	–	–	q	–	–	–	–	–	–	–	–	–	–	–	–	–	q	–	–					0
2009/10	Kuusamo	Lillehammer	Lillehammer	Engelberg	Engelberg	Engelberg	Oberstdorf	Garmisch-Partenkirchen	Innsbruck	Bischofshofen	Bad Mitterndorf	Bad Mitterndorf	Sapporo	Sapporo	Zakopane	Zakopane	Oberstdorf	Klingenthal	Willingen	Lahti	Kuopio	Lillehammer	Oslo									1
2009/10	32	30	–	q	q	33	43	q	q	q	–	–	–	–	–	–	–	–	–	–	–	–	q									1
2010/11	Kuusamo	Kuopio	Lillehammer	Lillehammer	Engelberg	Engelberg	Engelberg	Oberstdorf	Garmisch-Partenkirchen	Innsbruck	Bischofshofen	Harrachov	Harrachov	Sapporo	Sapporo	Zakopane	Zakopane	Zakopane	Willingen	Klingenthal	Oberstdorf	Vikersund	Vikersund	Lahti	Planica	Planica						2
2010/11	–	–	–	–	–	–	–	–	–	–	–	–	–	29	42	–	–	–	–	–	–	q	q	–	–	–						2
2011/12	Kuusamo	Lillehammer	Lillehammer	Harrachov	Harrachov	Engelberg	Engelberg	Oberstdorf	Garmisch-Partenkirchen	Innsbruck	Bischofshofen	Bad Mitterndorf	Bad Mitterndorf	Zakopane	Zakopane	Sapporo	Sapporo	Predazzo	Predazzo	Willingen	Oberstdorf	Lahti	Trondheim	Oslo	Planica	Planica						68
2011/12	–	38	q	–	–	–	–	–	–	26	11	23	21	35	13	–	–	40	45	–	–	30	31	–	–	–						68
2012/13	Lillehammer	Lillehammer	Kuusamo	Krasnaja Polana	Krasnaja Polana	Engelberg	Engelberg	Oberstdorf	Garmisch-Partenkirchen	Innsbruck	Bischofshofen	Wisła	Zakopane	Sapporo	Sapporo	Vikersund	Vikersund	Harrachov	Harrachov	Klingenthal	Oberstdorf	Lahti	Kuopio	Trondheim	Oslo	Planica	Planica					0
2012/13	–	–	–	–	–	–	–	–	–	–	–	–	–	–	–	–	–	–	–	–	–	–	–	–	–	–	–					0
2013/14	Klingenthal	Kuusamo	Lillehammer	Lillehammer	Titisee-Neustadt	Titisee-Neustadt	Engelberg	Engelberg	Oberstdorf	Garmisch-Partenkirchen	Innsbruck	Bischofshofen	Tauplitz	Tauplitz	Wisła	Zakopane	Sapporo	Sapporo	Willingen	Willingen	Falun	Lahti	Lahti	Kuopio	Trondheim	Oslo	Planica	Planica				0
2013/14	–	–	–	–	–	–	–	–	–	–	–	–	–	–	–	–	–	–	–	–	–	–	–	–	–	–	–	–				0
2014/15	Klingenthal	Kuusamo	Kuusamo	Lillehammer	Lillehammer	Nizhny Tagil	Nizhny Tagil	Engelberg	Engelberg	Oberstdorf	Garmisch-Partenkirchen	Innsbruck	Bischofshofen	Tauplitz	Wisła	Zakopane	Sapporo	Sapporo	Willingen	Willingen	Titisee-Neustadt	Titisee-Neustadt	Vikersund	Vikersund	Lahti	Kuopio	Trondheim	Oslo	Oslo	Planica	Planica	113
2014/15	–	–	–	24	–	–	–	–	–	–	–	–	–	–	–	–	19	26	37	33	14	35	7	31	–	–	–	20	23	15	–	113
2015/16	Klingenthal	Lillehammer	Lillehammer	Nizhny Tagil	Nizhny Tagil	Engelberg	Engelberg	Oberstdorf	Garmisch-Partenkirchen	Innsbruck	Bischofshofen	Willingen	Zakopane	Sapporo	Sapporo	Oslo	Trondheim	Vikersund	Vikersund	Lahti	Lahti	Kuopio	Almaty	Almaty	Wisła	Titisee-Neustadt	Planica	Planica	Planica			1348
2015/16	11	2	1	8	9	5	3	6	2	3	5	2	4	29	20	2	8	4	6	4	22	18	8	9	2	3	5	5	5			1348
