= Joachim Hauer =

Norwegian ski jumper

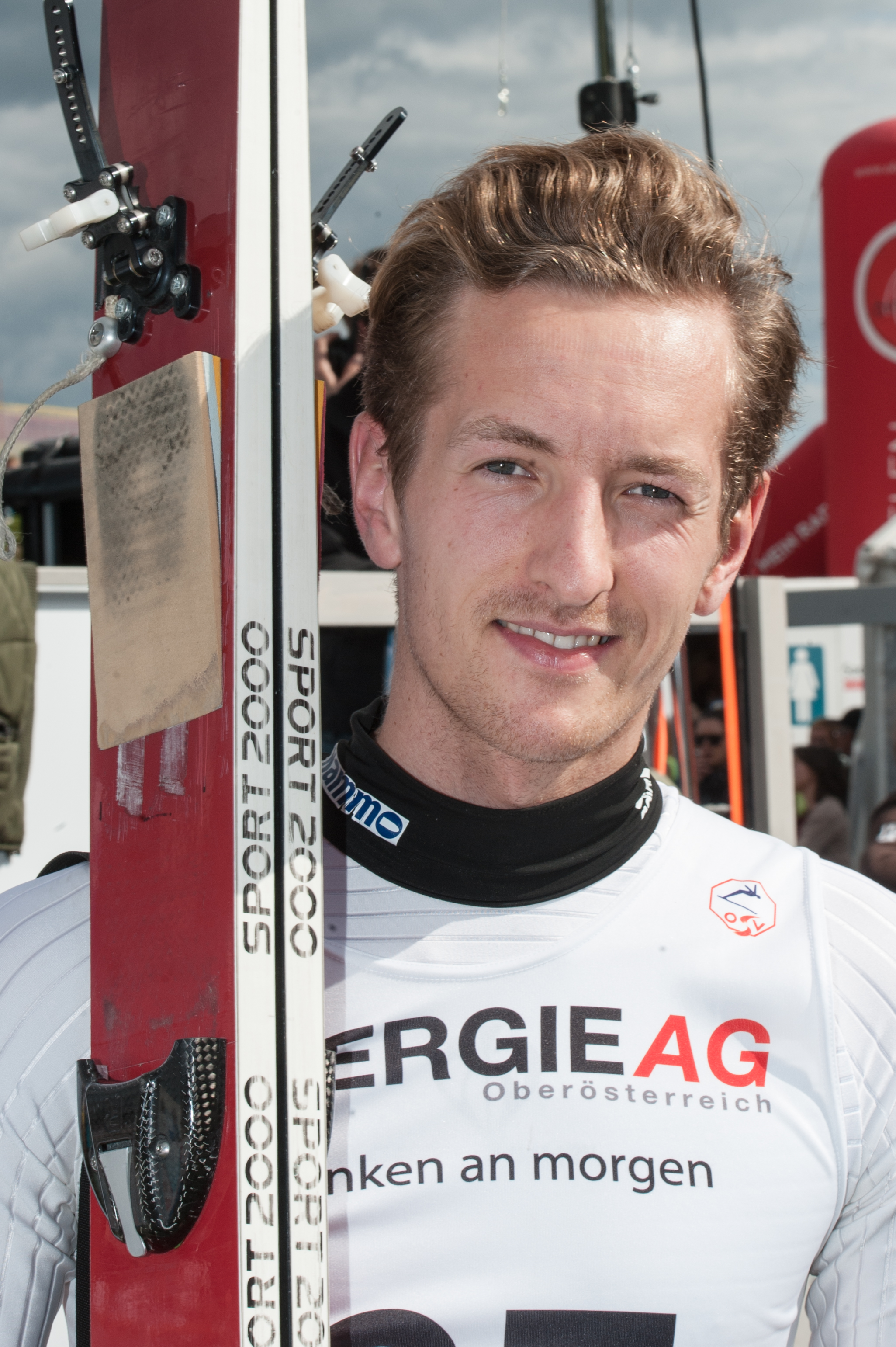
Joachim Hauer in 2015

Joachim Hauer (born 2 February 1991) is a Norwegian ski jumper.

Hauer made his World Cup debut in January 2014. His best individual result is a 3rd place, won in Nizhny Tagil in December 2015.

He hails from Oslo and represents the club Bækkelagets SK.
