= FIS Nordic World Ski Championships 2017 – Men's individual normal hill =

Men's individual normal hill at the FIS Nordic World Ski Championships 2017
- Venue: Salpausselkä
- Location: Lahti, Finland
- Date: 25 February
- Competitors: 50 from 16 nations
- Winning points: 270.8

Medalists
gold medal	Stefan Kraft	Austria
silver medal	Andreas Wellinger	Germany
bronze medal	Markus Eisenbichler	Germany

The Men's individual normal hill event of the FIS Nordic World Ski Championships 2017 was held on 25 February 2017.

== Results ==
=== Qualification ===
The qualification was held on 24 February 2017.

Rank	Bib	Name	Country	Distance (m)	Points	Notes
1	51	Dawid Kubacki	Poland	99.0	129.2	Q
2	56	Piotr Żyła	Poland	96.0	126.5	Q
3	33	Janne Ahonen	Finland	97.0	126.2	Q
4	52	Evgeni Klimov	Russia	97.5	125.3	Q
4	50	Stephan Leyhe	Germany	96.0	125.3	Q
6	45	Taku Takeuchi	Japan	94.5	123.4	Q
7	30	Alexey Romashov	Russia	96.5	122.8	Q
8	38	Johann André Forfang	Norway	96.5	122.2	Q
9	49	Robert Johansson	Norway	93.5	121.9	Q
10	29	Ville Larinto	Finland	95.5	120.5	Q
11	41	Jakub Janda	Czech Republic	94.0	120.0	Q
12	32	Viktor Polášek	Czech Republic	95.0	119.5	Q
13	48	Daiki Ito	Japan	93.0	119.3	Q
14	46	Roman Koudelka	Czech Republic	92.5	118.6	Q
15	39	Cene Prevc	Slovenia	94.0	118.3	Q
16	42	Gregor Schlierenzauer	Austria	92.5	118.1	Q
17	47	Noriaki Kasai	Japan	92.0	117.2	Q
17	43	Simon Ammann	Switzerland	88.5	117.2	Q
19	55	Richard Freitag	Germany	90.0	116.5	Q
20	25	Davide Bresadola	Italy	90.5	116.4	Q
20	10	Killian Peier	Switzerland	93.0	116.4	Q
22	31	Tomáš Vančura	Czech Republic	91.0	115.1	Q
23	36	Kevin Bickner	United States	92.0	115.0	Q
24	54	Andreas Stjernen	Norway	89.0	113.2	Q
24	37	MacKenzie Boyd-Clowes	Canada	91.5	113.2	Q
26	14	Alex Insam	Italy	89.5	111.8	Q
27	26	Gregor Deschwanden	Switzerland	89.0	110.0	Q
28	28	Dimitry Vassiliev	Russia	92.5	109.6	Q
29	34	Jarkko Määttä	Finland	90.0	109.3	Q
30	24	Michael Glasder	United States	87.5	108.9	Q
31	40	Denis Kornilov	Russia	89.5	108.7	Q
32	27	Kento Sakuyama	Japan	88.0	108.5	Q
33	53	Vincent Descombes Sevoie	France	88.0	108.4	Q
34	1	Antti Aalto	Finland	89.0	107.8	Q
35	3	Andreas Schuler	Switzerland	87.0	106.3	Q
36	2	Vladimir Zografski	Bulgaria	85.0	102.5	Q
37	35	Sebastian Colloredo	Italy	87.0	102.3	Q
38	19	Paul Brasme	France	86.0	101.8	Q
39	44	Jernej Damjan	Slovenia	86.5	100.8	Q
40	23	Kaarel Nurmsalu	Estonia	82.5	99.4	Q
41	21	Ilya Kratov	Kazakhstan	84.0	97.5	
42	13	Artti Aigro	Estonia	83.0	97.2	
43	16	Fatih İpcioğlu	Turkey	83.0	95.9	
44	8	Casey Larson	United States	83.0	92.7	
45	18	Martti Nõmme	Estonia	80.5	91.9	
46	4	Joshua Maurer	Canada	77.5	87.1	
47	22	Nicolae Mitrofan	Romania	79.0	87.0	
48	9	Nikolay Karpenko	Kazakhstan	77.5	82.4	
49	5	Sorin Iulian Pîtea	Romania	77.5	81.7	
50	20	Stepan Pasichnyk	Ukraine	79.0	80.8	
51	12	Roman Nogin	Kazakhstan	72.0	68.4	
52	15	Artur Sarkisiani	Georgia	68.0	63.4	
53	11	Kristaps Nežborts	Latvia	67.0	59.4	
—	6	William Rhoads	United States	DSQ		
—	17	Vitaliy Kalinichenko	Ukraine	DSQ		
—	7	Alexey Korolev	Kazakhstan	DSQ		
Prequalified
	57	Peter Prevc	Slovenia	98.5		Q
	58	Markus Eisenbichler	Germany	DNS		Q
	59	Manuel Fettner	Austria	95.5		Q
	60	Michael Hayböck	Austria	95.0		Q
	61	Andreas Wellinger	Germany	98.5		Q
	62	Maciej Kot	Poland	97.0		Q
	63	Domen Prevc	Slovenia	88.5		Q
	64	Daniel-André Tande	Norway	94.0		Q
	65	Stefan Kraft	Austria	99.5		Q
	66	Kamil Stoch	Poland	103.5		Q

=== Final ===
The final was held on 25 February 2017.

Rank	Bib	Name	Country	Round 1 Distance (m)	Round 1 Points	Round 1 Rank	Final Round Distance (m)	Final Round Points	Final Round Rank	Total Points
1st place, gold medalist(s)	49	Stefan Kraft	Austria	99.5	135.8	1	98.0	135.0	3	270.8
2nd place, silver medalist(s)	45	Andreas Wellinger	Germany	96.5	131.5	2	100.0	137.2	1	268.7
3rd place, bronze medalist(s)	42	Markus Eisenbichler	Germany	95.0	128.3	6	100.5	135.3	2	263.6
4	50	Kamil Stoch	Poland	96.5	129.8	4	99.0	132.7	4	262.5
5	46	Maciej Kot	Poland	95.0	128.1	7	95.5	127.0	6	255.1
6	44	Michael Hayböck	Austria	98.0	130.9	3	95.5	123.5	11	254.4
7	22	Johann André Forfang	Norway	93.0	122.4	12	98.5	130.7	5	253.1
8	35	Dawid Kubacki	Poland	96.5	129.3	5	93.5	122.2	15	251.5
9	39	Richard Freitag	Germany	94.5	123.9	9	96.0	126.5	7	250.4
10	32	Daiki Ito	Japan	95.5	124.7	8	94.5	125.1	9	249.8
11	41	Peter Prevc	Slovenia	92.5	121.2	15	95.0	126.0	8	247.2
12	43	Manuel Fettner	Austria	95.0	123.9	9	94.5	122.4	13	246.3
13	34	Stephan Leyhe	Germany	94.0	123.2	11	94.0	121.7	17	244.9
14	30	Roman Koudelka	Czech Republic	93.0	122.4	12	92.5	122.3	14	244.7
15	48	Daniel-André Tande	Norway	92.5	119.7	19	94.5	123.8	10	243.5
16	33	Robert Johansson	Norway	93.5	120.1	17	94.5	122.5	12	242.6
17	38	Andreas Stjernen	Norway	95.0	121.3	14	95.0	120.5	19	241.8
18	4	Killian Peier	Switzerland	93.0	120.0	18	93.0	120.6	18	240.6
19	40	Piotr Żyła	Poland	91.5	118.0	20	94.0	122.2	15	240.2
20	29	Taku Takeuchi	Japan	94.5	121.2	15	91.5	117.0	21	238.2
21	27	Simon Ammann	Switzerland	91.5	116.6	21	92.0	118.8	20	235.4
22	36	Evgeniy Klimov	Russia	91.5	115.6	22	90.5	114.9	22	230.5
23	25	Jakub Janda	Czech Republic	89.0	112.9	26	90.0	114.9	22	227.8
24	26	Gregor Schlierenzauer	Austria	89.5	115.0	23	90.0	112.0	26	227.0
25	17	Janne Ahonen	Finland	90.5	114.7	24	89.5	111.6	27	226.3
26	13	Ville Larinto	Finland	89.5	112.7	27	90.0	112.8	25	225.5
27	9	Davide Bresadola	Italy	89.5	110.7	29	90.5	113.8	24	224.5
28	31	Noriaki Kasai	Japan	90.0	112.0	28	89.0	109.7	28	221.7
29	24	Denis Kornilov	Russia	92.5	113.1	25	86.0	104.5	29	217.6
30	12	Dimitry Vassiliev	Russia	90.5	110.6	30	86.5	103.8	30	214.4
31	16	Viktor Polášek	Czech Republic	89.0	109.3	31	DNQ			109.3
32	28	Jernej Damjan	Slovenia	88.0	109.2	32	DNQ			109.2
33	10	Gregor Deschwanden	Switzerland	88.0	108.6	33	DNQ			108.6
34	47	Domen Prevc	Slovenia	89.0	108.1	34	DNQ			108.1
35	18	Jarkko Määttä	Finland	88.0	107.5	35	DNQ			107.5
35	15	Tomáš Vančura	Czech Republic	87.0	107.5	35	DNQ			107.5
37	19	Sebastian Colloredo	Italy	88.5	107.3	37	DNQ			107.3
38	1	Antti Aalto	Finland	87.5	107.1	38	DNQ			107.1
39	21	Mackenzie Boyd-Clowes	Canada	87.5	106.0	39	DNQ			106.0
40	11	Kento Sakuyama	Japan	87.5	105.7	40	DNQ			105.7
41	37	Vincent Descombes Sevoie	France	87.5	105.5	41	DNQ			105.5
42	2	Vladimir Zografski	Bulgaria	88.0	105.2	42	DNQ			105.2
43	23	Cene Prevc	Slovenia	86.0	104.1	43	DNQ			104.1
44	14	Alexey Romashov	Russia	86.0	101.8	44	DNQ			101.8
45	5	Alex Insam	Italy	86.0	101.5	45	DNQ			101.5
46	3	Andreas Schuler	Switzerland	85.5	98.9	46	DNQ			98.9
47	20	Kevin Bickner	United States	83.5	98.5	47	DNQ			98.5
48	7	Kaarel Nurmsalu	Estonia	83.0	97.8	48	DNQ			97.8
49	8	Michael Glasder	United States	82.0	94.5	49	DNQ			94.5
50	6	Paul Brasme	France	83.0	94.1	50	DNQ			94.1
