= FIS Ski Flying World Championships 2016 =

2016 edition of the FIS Ski-Flying World Championships

- Host city: Tauplitz/Bad Mitterndorf, Austria
- Nations: 16
- Athletes: 45
- Sport: Ski flying
- Events: 2
- Opening: 14 January 2016
- Closing: 17 January 2016
- Main venue: Kulm
- Website: skifliegen.at

The FIS Ski Flying World Championships 2016 was held between 15 and 17 January 2016 in Tauplitz/Bad Mitterndorf, Austria for the fifth time. Kulm hosted the event previously in 1975, 1986, 1996 and 2006. The individual defending champion was Severin Freund.

Peter Prevc from Slovenia became new ski flying individual world champion after three rounds of competition with two of them were new hill records. Fourth round was cancelled due to wind conditions. Norway won the team event in front of Germany with a record margin of 110,4 points, while Austria came in third.

== Schedule ==
Kulm (K200 / HS225)
Date	Competition	Longest jump of the day	Metres	Feet
13 January 2016	hill test	(Austria) Fabian Steindl	229.0	751
14 January 2016	Q, opening ceremony	(Slovenia) Peter Prevc	235.5	773
15 January 2016	1st day individual	(Slovenia) Peter Prevc	243.0	797
16 January 2016	2nd day individual	(Slovenia) Peter Prevc	244.0	801
17 January 2016	team event	(Slovenia) Peter Prevc	238.0	781

== Results ==
=== Qualifying ===
Rank	Bib	Name	Training 1	Training 2	Qualifying	Points	Note
1	42	(Norway) Anders Fannemel	222.0	204.5	233.0	205.9	Q
2	23	(Slovenia) Robert Kranjec	218.0	220.0	207.0	173.4	Q
3	40	(Switzerland) Simon Ammann	207.0	177.0	205.0	170.9	Q
4	29	(Slovenia) Jurij Tepeš	219.0	191.0	193.5	170.3	Q
5	41	(Czech Republic) Roman Koudelka	184.0	173.5	199.5	169.9	Q
6	19	(Poland) Dawid Kubacki	172.0	180.0	202.0	166.9	Q
7	30	(Austria) Manuel Poppinger	204.0	186.0	191.0	163.8	Q
8	32	(France) Vincent Descombes Sevoie	188.5	181.5	195.5	162.0	Q
9	36	(Austria) Manuel Fettner	179.0	188.5	186.0	161.9	Q
10	37	(Slovenia) Anže Lanišek	181.5	186.5	189.5	160.8	Q
11	28	(Czech Republic) Lukáš Hlava	191.0	175.0	185.0	160.0	Q
12	20	(Poland) Klemens Murańka	193.0	209.5	196.0	159.4	Q
13	26	(Czech Republic) Jan Matura	204.0	184.0	190.5	157.8	Q
14	24	(Japan) Kento Sakuyama	205.0	185.0	187.5	157.4	Q
15	10	(Czech Republic) Tomáš Vančura	215.0	184.0	183.5	149.5	Q
16	16	(Finland) Ville Larinto	209.0	168.5	191.5	149.1	Q
17	18	(Russia) Ilmir Hazetdinov	154.0	160.0	183.5	141.2	Q
18	31	(Poland) Stefan Hula	191.0	176.5	170.0	139.0	Q
19	15	(Canada) MacKenzie Boyd-Clowes	212.5	200.5	162.0	130.1	Q
20	14	(Russia) Denis Kornilov	170.5	169.5	159.0	120.2	Q
21	39	(Germany) Andreas Wank	182.0	178.0	162.5	119.8	Q
22	1	(United States) Michael Glasder	180.5	154.0	155.5	119.1	Q
23	27	(Switzerland) Gregor Deschwanden	141.0	144.5	150.5	110.1	Q
24	5	(Finland) Harri Olli	176.5	166.0	145.0	109.4	Q
25	25	(Finland) Lauri Asikainen	163.0	149.0	152.5	105.5	Q
26	7	(Russia) Vladislav Boyarintsev	173.5	156.0	145.0	104.5	Q
27	6	(South Korea) Heung-chul Choi	153.0	114.0	140.5	104.2	Q
28	8	(Kazakhstan) Radik Zhaparov	169.5	146.0	138.0	95.9	Q
29	33	(Germany) Stephan Leyhe	209.5	187.0	137.5	94.5	Q
30	13	(Italy) Sebastian Colloredo	167.0	152.5	145.5	93.7	Q
not qualified
31	4	(Kazakhstan) Marat Zhaparov	157.0	157.0	136.0	92.6	
32	34	(Poland) Kamil Stoch	180.5	176.0	134.5	90.3	
33	21	(France) Ronan Lamy Chappuis	176.0	141.5	142.0	92.2	
34	3	(Russia) Mikhail Maksimochkin	180.0	141.5	134.0	84.9	
35	9	(Finland) Sebastian Klinga	153.0	114.0	130.0	76.0	
prequalified
*	44	(Japan) Noriaki Kasai	DNS	DNS	DNS		q
*	45	(Germany) Andreas Wellinger	191.0	190.0	166.0		q
*	46	(Germany) Richard Freitag	196.5	194.0	197.0		q
*	47	(Norway) Daniel-André Tande	198.5	202.5	212.5		q
*	48	(Austria) Stefan Kraft	208.5	216.5	211.5		q
*	49	(Norway) Johann André Forfang	220.5	206.5	191.5		q
*	50	(Austria) Michael Hayböck	216.0	204.5	193.0		q
*	51	(Norway) Kenneth Gangnes	213.0	206.0	140.0		q
*	52	(Germany) Severin Freund	203.5	213.0	206.5		q
*	53	(Slovenia) Peter Prevc	225.0	235.5	188.5		q
internal team qualification: did not enter in qualifying round
	2	(Slovenia) Andraž Pograjc	181.5	152.5	DNS		
	11	(United States) Kevin Bickner	DNS	DNS	DNS		
	12	(Austria) Philipp Aschenwald	216.0	167.0	DNS		
	17	(Russia) Evgeniy Klimov	144.0	161.0	DNS		
	22	(Poland) Piotr Żyła	191.5	173.0	DNS		
	35	(Czech Republic) Jakub Janda	173.5	140.0	DNS		
	38	(Norway) Joachim Hauer	184.0	192.0	DNS		
	43	(Norway) Andreas Stjernen	165.5	173.5	DNS		

=== Trial rounds ===
Bib	Individual D1	15 January
1	(United States) Michael Glasder	189.5
2	(Finland) Harri Olli	203.5
3	(South Korea) Heung-chul Choi	185.5
4	(Russia) Vladislav Boyarintsev	170.5
5	(Kazakhstan) Radik Zhaparov	174.5
6	(Czech Republic) Tomáš Vančura	207.5
7	(Italy) Sebastian Colloredo	162.5
8	(Russia) Denis Kornilov	184.5
9	(Canada) MacKenzie Boyd-Clowes	209.0
10	(Finland) Ville Larinto	188.0
11	(Russia) Ilmir Hazetdinov	193.0
12	(Poland) Dawid Kubacki	172.0
13	(Poland) Klemens Murańka	189.0
14	(Slovenia) Robert Kranjec	204.0
15	(Japan) Kento Sakuyama	194.5
16	(Finland) Lauri Asikainen	149.0
17	(Czech Republic) Jan Matura	191.0
18	(Switzerland) Gregor Deschwanden	201.0
19	(Czech Republic) Lukáš Hlava	201.0
20	(Slovenia) Jurij Tepeš	206.0
21	(Austria) Manuel Poppinger	203.0
22	(Poland) Stefan Hula	190.0
23	(France) Vincent Descombes Sevoie	202.5
24	(Germany) Stephan Leyhe	189.0
25	(Austria) Manuel Fettner	200.0
26	(Slovenia) Anže Lanišek	213.5
27	(Germany) Andreas Wank	164.0
28	(Switzerland) Simon Ammann	180.5
29	(Czech Republic) Roman Koudelka	150.5
30	(Norway) Anders Fannemel	232.5
31	(Japan) Noriaki Kasai	233.5
32	(Germany) Andreas Wellinger	218.0
33	(Germany) Richard Freitag	192.0
34	(Norway) Daniel-André Tande	201.0
35	(Austria) Stefan Kraft	212.0
36	(Norway) Johann André Forfang	214.0
37	(Austria) Michael Hayböck	201.0
38	(Norway) Kenneth Gangnes	213.5
39	(Germany) Severin Freund	201.5
40	(Slovenia) Peter Prevc	224.5

Bib	Individual D2	16 January
1	(Switzerland) Gregor Deschwanden	170.0
2	(Russia) Denis Kornilov	DNS
3	(Germany) Andreas Wank	144.0
4	(Czech Republic) Jan Matura	180.5
5	(Austria) Manuel Fettner	186.0
6	(Czech Republic) Lukáš Hlava	175.5
7	(Canada) MacKenzie Boyd-Clowes	216.5
8	(Czech Republic) Tomáš Vančura	222.0
9	(Poland) Stefan Hula	190.5
10	(Czech Republic) Roman Koudelka	217.0
11	(Poland) Klemens Murańka	195.5
12	(Germany) Stephan Leyhe	200.0
13	(Austria) Manuel Poppinger	213.5
14	(Switzerland) Simon Ammann	185.0
15	(Austria) Michael Hayböck	218.0
16	(Poland) Dawid Kubacki	173.0
17	(Norway) Daniel-André Tande	196.0
18	(Germany) Andreas Wellinger	211.0
19	(France) Vincent Descombes Sevoie	140.5
20	(Germany) Richard Freitag	217.0
21	(Slovenia) Jurij Tepeš	203.5
22	(Slovenia) Anže Lanišek	172.0
23	(Slovenia) Robert Kranjec	205.0
24	(Germany) Severin Freund	204.0
25	(Norway) Anders Fannemel	122.0
26	(Japan) Noriaki Kasai	DNS
27	(Norway) Johann André Forfang	132.0
28	(Austria) Stefan Kraft	DNS
29	(Slovenia) Peter Prevc	221.0
30	(Norway) Kenneth Gangnes	238.0

Bib	Team event	17 January
1 1	(Russia) Vladislav Boyarintsev	149.0
2 1	(Finland) Harri Olli	125.0
3 1	(Poland) Kamil Stoch	214.0
4 1	(Czech Republic) Tomáš Vančura	136.0
5 1	(Austria) Stefan Kraft	220.5
6 1	(Slovenia) Robert Kranjec	158.0
7 1	(Norway) Anders Fannemel	196.5
8 1	(Germany) Andreas Wellinger	200.5
1 2	(Russia) Mikhail Maksimochkin	118.0
2 2	(Finland) Sebastian Klinga	127.0
3 2	(Poland) Klemens Murańka	211.5
4 2	(Czech Republic) Jan Matura	
5 2	(Austria) Manuel Poppinger	
6 2	(Slovenia) Jurij Tepeš	
7 2	(Norway) Johann André Forfang	
8 2	(Germany) Stephan Leyhe	
1 3	(Russia) Ilmir Hazetdinov	
2 3	(Finland) Lauri Asikainen	
3 3	(Poland) Dawid Kubacki	
4 3	(Czech Republic) Lukáš Hlava	
5 3	(Austria) Manuel Fettner	
6 3	(Slovenia) Anže Lanišek	
7 3	(Norway) Daniel-André Tande	
8 3	(Germany) Richard Freitag	
1 4	(Russia) Denis Kornilov	
2 4	(Finland) Ville Larinto	
3 4	(Poland) Stefan Hula	
4 4	(Czech Republic) Roman Koudelka	
5 4	(Austria) Michael Hayböck	
6 4	(Slovenia) Peter Prevc	
7 4	(Norway) Kenneth Gangnes	
8 4	(Germany) Severin Freund	

*team trial cancelled after Klemens Murańka, heavy snow.

== Competition ==
=== Individual ===
Rank	Bib1	Bib2	Name	15 January (Day 1)		16 January (Day 2)		Total
Rank	Bib1	Bib2	Name	1st round	2nd round	3rd round	4th round	Total
1	40	29	(Slovenia) Peter Prevc	243.0	213.5	244.0		640.1
2	38	30	(Norway) Kenneth Gangnes	236.0	216.0	238.5		636.8
3	35	28	(Austria) Stefan Kraft	226.5	220.0	226.5		629.2
4	36	27	(Norway) Johann André Forfang	230.0	216.5	240.0		602.0
5	31	26	(Japan) Noriaki Kasai	240.5	215.0	220.0		600.4
6	39	24	(Germany) Severin Freund	209.5	203.0	223.5		565.3
7	30	25	(Norway) Anders Fannemel	234.0	214.5	175.5		543.9
8	33	20	(Germany) Richard Freitag	211.5	186.0	231.0		542.8
9	20	21	(Slovenia) Jurij Tepeš	218.5	201.5	220.0		535.5
10	14	23	(Slovenia) Robert Kranjec	204.5	213.5	210.0		534.9
11	37	15	(Austria) Michael Hayböck	217.5	175.0	228.0		533.7
12	26	22	(Slovenia) Anže Lanišek	215.0	207.0	204.5		523.5
13	23	19	(France) Vincent Descombes Sevoie	215.0	208.5	206.0		520.5
14	32	18	(Germany) Andreas Wellinger	200.0	205.0	211.5		520.0
15	12	16	(Poland) Dawid Kubacki	208.0	200.5	206.5		519.1
16	28	14	(Switzerland) Simon Ammann	208.5	204.5	209.5		512.5
17	21	13	(Austria) Manuel Poppinger	204.0	191.0	209.5		502.6
18	34	17	(Norway) Daniel-André Tande	209.5	180.5	192.5		497.5
19	24	12	(Germany) Stephan Leyhe	193.5	190.5	205.5		467.0
20	29	10	(Czech Republic) Roman Koudelka	194.0	182.0	202.0		463.4
21	22	9	(Poland) Stefan Hula	202.5	167.5	193.0		450.4
22	17	4	(Czech Republic) Jan Matura	184.5	152.0	198.0		414.2
23	6	8	(Czech Republic) Tomáš Vančura	210.5	166.5	160.0		409.7
24	19	6	(Czech Republic) Lukáš Hlava	191.0	160.0	179.5		408.9
25	25	5	(Austria) Manuel Fettner	194.5	156.0	171.0		401.4
26	13	11	(Poland) Klemens Murańka	198.0	174.5	142.0		397.0
27	9	7	(Canada) MacKenzie Boyd-Clowes	194.0	165.5	131.0		364.4
28	27	3	(Germany) Andreas Wank	189.5	149.5	148.0		355.0
29	8	2	(Russia) Denis Kornilov	179.5	149.5	144.0		337.1
30	18	1	(Switzerland) Gregor Deschwanden	173.5	149.0	142.0		319.8
not qualified for 2nd round
31	15		(Japan) Kento Sakuyama	160.0				127.4
32	11		(Russia) Ilmir Hazetdinov	174.0				126.1
33	4		(Russia) Vladislav Boyarintsev	161.5				113.6
34	10		(Finland) Ville Larinto	155.5				112.8
35	2		(Finland) Harri Olli	153.5				110.8
36	5		(Kazakhstan) Radik Zhaparov	157.5				109.4
37	1		(United States) Michael Glasder	145.0				98.5
38	16		(Finland) Lauri Asikainen	143.5				97.6
39	7		(Italy) Sebastian Colloredo	150.0				93.1
40	3		(South Korea) Heung-chul Choi	130.5				82.0

=== Team ===
Rank	Bib	Name	1st round	2nd round	Total
1	7	Norway 1 Anders Fannemel; 2 Johann André Forfang; 3 Daniel-André Tande; 4 Kenneth Gangnes	213.5; 218.5; 206.5; 207.0	217.5; 201.5; 215.5; 219.5	1467.7; 377.5; 359.2; 361.7; 369.3
2	8	Germany 1 Andreas Wellinger; 2 Stephan Leyhe; 3 Richard Freitag; 4 Severin Freund	196.0; 168.0; 213.5; 219.0	193.0; 202.0; 207.0; 218.5	1357.3; 320.3; 291.9; 355.3; 389.8
3	5	Austria 1 Stefan Kraft; 2 Manuel Poppinger; 3 Manuel Fettner; 4 Michael Hayböck	225.5; 209.0; 180.5; 207.5	230.0; 150.5; 156.5; 216.0	1310.4; 396.9; 287.0; 255.1; 371.4
4	6	Slovenia 1 Robert Kranjec; 2 Jurij Tepeš; 3 Anže Lanišek; 4 Peter Prevc	209.0; 170.0; 180.5; 228.0	211.5; 157.0; 157.5; 238.0	1272.2; 356.0; 246.5; 250.7; 419.5
5	3	Poland 1 Kamil Stoch; 2 Klemens Murańka; 3 Dawid Kubacki; 4 Stefan Hula	207.0; 203.0; 166.0; 191.5	202.5; 170.0; 190.0; 189.5	1211.9; 345.5; 290.7; 266.0; 309.7
6	4	Czech Republic 1 Tomas Vancura; 2 Jan Matura; 3 Lukáš Hlava; 4 Roman Koudelka	169.0; 195.5; 169.5; 156.5	202.5; 168.0; 157.5; 154.5	1018.4; 290.5; 282.4; 234.8; 210.7
7	2	Finland 1 Harri Olli; 2 Sebastian Klinga; 3 Lauri Asikainen; 4 Ville Larinto	144.5; 118.0; 127.0; 180.5	140.0; 115.0; 156.0; 163.0	721.6; 181.4; 109.6; 175.1; 255.5
8	1	Russia 1 Vladislav Boyarintsev; 2 Mikhail Maksimochkin; 3 Ilmir Hazetdinov; 4 Denis Kornilov	110.0; 124.0; 157.5; 159.5	140.5; 128.0; 162.0; 153.5	707.5; 121.1; 150.0; 214.3; 222.1
