= Tomáš Vančura =

Czech ski jumper (born 1996)

Tomáš Vančura (born 10 September 1996) is a Czech ski jumper.

On the Continental Cup circuit, he won his first race on 22 January 2016 in Sapporo, and repeated the feat in January 2017 in Bischofshofen. He made his FIS Ski Jumping World Cup debut on 30 January 2016 in Sapporo with a 37th place, collecting his first World Cup points on the next day with a 28th place. He improved to a 25th and 21st place in February 2017 in Oberstdorf and broke the top 20 for the first time in March 2017 in Planica, where he finished 18th.

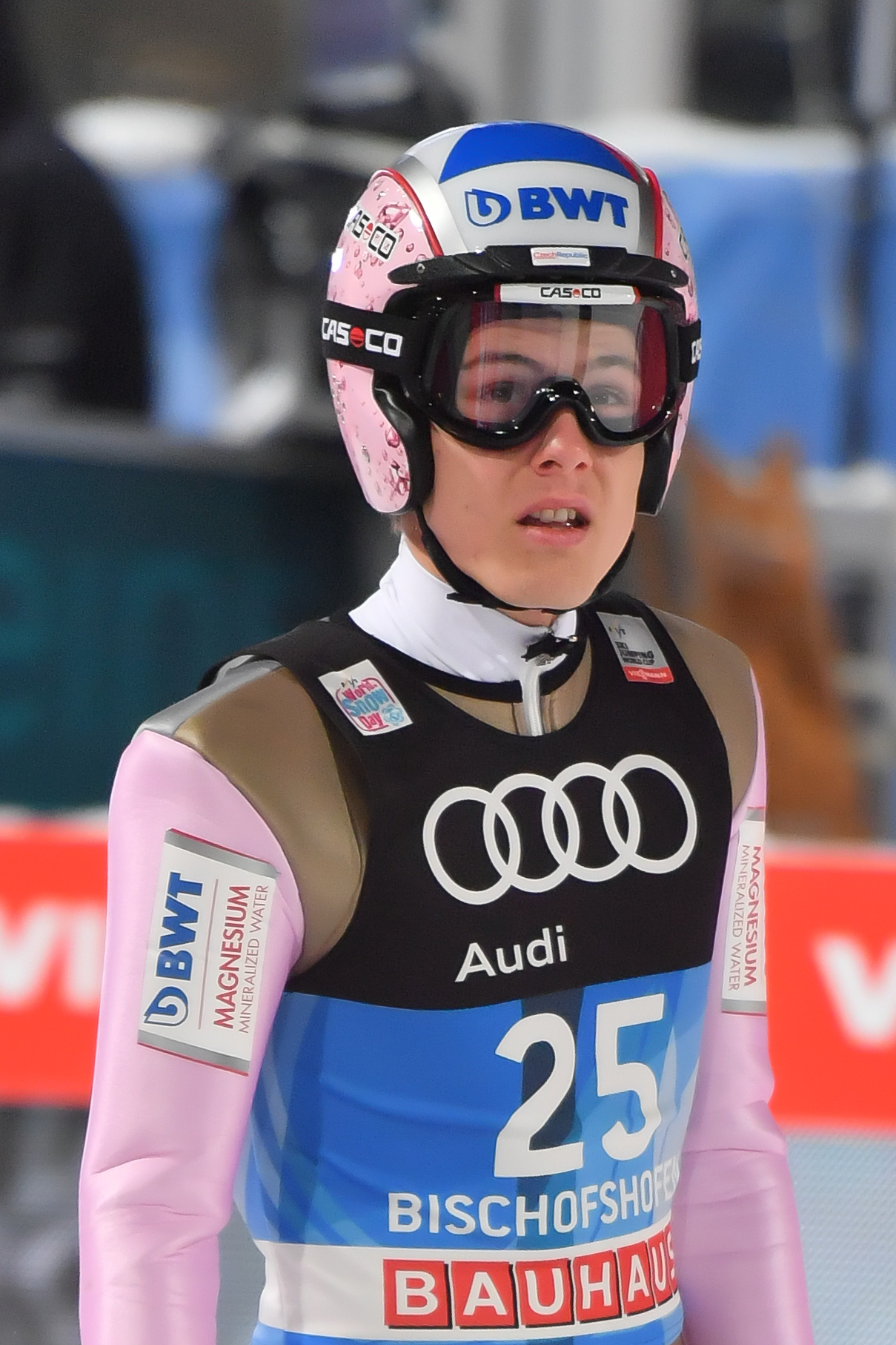

He finished seventh in the normal hill event at the 2016 Nordic Junior World Ski Championships and 23rd at the 2016 Ski Flying World Championships. He competed at the World Ski Championships in 2017 and 2019, his best placements being 7th in the team competition in 2017 and 8th in the team competition in 2019. His best individual performance was a 35th place in the normal hill event in 2017.

He represented the sports club TJ Dukla Liberec.
