= Andreas Wellinger =

German ski jumper (born 1995)

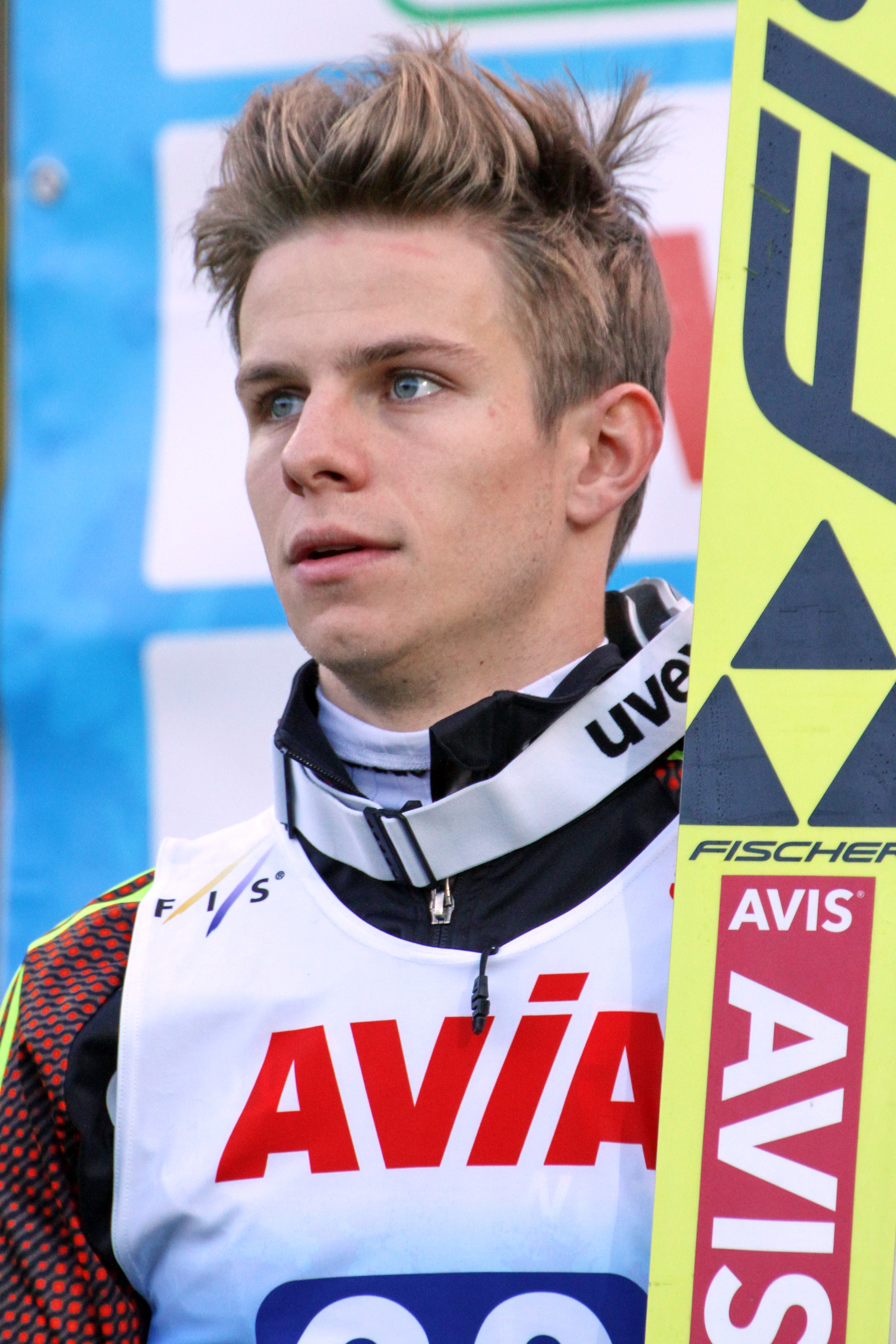
- Wellinger in Klingenthal, 2017

Personal information
- Nationality: Germany
- Born: 28 August 1995 (age 31) Ruhpolding, Germany
- Height: 1.84 m (6 ft 0 in)

Sport
- Sport: Skiing
- Club: SC Ruhpolding

World Cup career
- Seasons: 2012–present
- Indiv. starts: 244
- Indiv. podiums: 40
- Indiv. wins: 9
- Team starts: 43
- Team podiums: 28
- Team wins: 8

Achievements and titles
- Personal bests: 245 m (804 ft); Vikersund, 18 March 2017
Medal record
Representing Germany
Men's ski jumping
Event	1st	2nd	3rd
Olympic Games	2	2	0
Ski Jumping World Championships	2	4	0
Ski Flying World Championships	0	3	1
Total	4	9	1
Olympic Games
Gold medal – first place	2014 Sochi	Team LH
Gold medal – first place	2018 Pyeongchang	Individual NH
Silver medal – second place	2018 Pyeongchang	Individual LH
Silver medal – second place	2018 Pyeongchang	Team LH
World Championships
Gold medal – first place	2017 Lahti	Mixed team NH
Gold medal – first place	2023 Planica	Mixed team NH
Silver medal – second place	2017 Lahti	Individual NH
Silver medal – second place	2017 Lahti	Individual LH
Silver medal – second place	2023 Planica	Individual NH
Silver medal – second place	2025 Trondheim	Individual NH
Men's ski flying
World Championships
Silver medal – second place	2016 Bad Mitterndorf	Team
Silver medal – second place	2022 Vikersund	Team
Silver medal – second place	2024 Bad Mitterndorf	Individual
Bronze medal – third place	2024 Bad Mitterndorf	Team
- Updated on 1 December 2024

Andreas Wellinger (born 28 August 1995) is a German ski jumper. His career-best achievements include an individual gold and silver medal at the 2018 Winter Olympics. He also won a team gold medal at the 2014 Winter Olympics and a team silver medal at the 2018 Winter Olympics, a mixed team gold at the 2017 and 2023 Ski Jumping World Championships, and individual silver medals at the 2017 and 2023 World Championships and the 2024 Ski Flying World Championships.

Wellinger's best finish in the World Cup overall standings is third place, in the 2023–24 season.

== Career ==
Wellinger's debut in FIS Ski Jumping World Cup took place in 2012 on competition on small hill in Lillehammer. He led after the first round, but in the second round he dropped to fifth place. The same year, he won the large hill team event in Kuusamo and got two individual podiums in Sochi and Engelberg as well. During the 2012/2013 season, he reached 393 points and finished the World Cup in 20th place.

He won the FIS Ski Jumping Grand Prix in 2013, ahead of Slovene ski jumper Jernej Damjan. At the first competition in season 2013/2014 in Klingenthal, he was second and that was his third podium. In Engelberg, the same year, he also finished second. He ended the Four Hills Tournament in 10th place. Then he won in Wisla 2014. He was on Germany's 2014 Winter Olympics ski jumping team. He was sixth on the normal hill and won the gold medal with his teammates in the team event. He ended 2013/2014 season in 9th place. He started season 2014/2015 in Klingenthal with 3rd place. In Ruka he had a bad fall and broke his collarbone and next jumped on 6 March in Lahti.

=== 2018: Winter Olympic Games ===
Wellinger won the gold medal in the normal hill event in Pyeongchang. He also won the silver in the large hill event, and another silver as part of the German team in the team event.

== Major tournament results ==
=== Olympic Games ===
Event	Normal hill	Large hill	Team LH	Team Mixed
(Russia) 2014 Sochi	6	45	1st place, gold medalist(s)	–
(South Korea) 2018 Pyeongchang	1st place, gold medalist(s)	2nd place, silver medalist(s)	2nd place, silver medalist(s)	–

=== FIS Nordic World Ski Championships ===
Event	Normal hill	Large hill	Team LH	Mixed Team
(Sweden) 2015 Falun	11	DNS	—	—
(Finland) 2017 Lahti	2nd place, silver medalist(s)	2nd place, silver medalist(s)	4	1st place, gold medalist(s)
(Austria) 2019 Seefeld	—	32	—	—
(Slovenia) 2023 Planica	2nd place, silver medalist(s)	13	5	1st place, gold medalist(s)
(Norway) 2025 Trondheim	2nd place, silver medalist(s)	10	4	4

=== FIS Ski Flying World Championships ===
Event	Individual	Team
(Czech Republic) 2014 Harrachov	13	Cancelled
(Austria) 2016 Bad Mitterndorf	14	2nd place, silver medalist(s)
(Germany) 2018 Oberstdorf	7	4
(Norway) 2022 Vikersund	14	2nd place, silver medalist(s)
(Austria) 2024 Bad Mitterndorf	2nd place, silver medalist(s)	3rd place, bronze medalist(s)

== World Cup ==
=== Season standings ===
Season				Tour Standings		
Season	Overall	4H	SF	RA	W6	P7
2012/13	20	9	45	N/A		
2013/14	9	10	12	N/A		
2014/15	35	—	—	N/A		
2015/16	17	12	—	N/A		
2016/17	4	22	2nd place, silver medalist(s)	3rd place, bronze medalist(s)	N/A	
2017/18	6	2nd place, silver medalist(s)	26	19	5	24
2018/19	18	31	22	33	19	25
2020/21	—	62	—	—	—	—
2021/22	29	31	25	29	N/A	17
2022/23	7	11	9	22	N/A	17
2023/24	3rd place, bronze medalist(s)	2nd place, silver medalist(s)	7	6	N/A	15
2024/25	7				N/A	

=== Wins ===
No.	Season	Date	Location	Hill	Size
1	2013/14	16 January 2014	(Poland) Wisła	Malinka HS134	LH
2	2016/17	29 January 2017	(Germany) Willingen	Mühlenkopfschanze HS145	LH
3	2017/18	3 December 2017	(Russia) Nizhny Tagil	Tramplin Stork HS134	LH
4	2022/23	11 February 2023	(United States) Lake Placid	MacKenzie Intervale Complex HS128	LH
5	2022/23	18 February 2023	(Romania) Râșnov	Râșnov Ski Jump HS97	NH
6	2023/24	29 December 2023	(Germany) Oberstdorf	Schattenbergschanze HS137	LH
7	2023/24	4 February 2024	(Germany) Willingen	Mühlenkopfschanze HS147	LH
8	2024/25	1 December 2024	(Finland) Ruka	Rukatunturi HS142	LH
9	2024/25	15 March 2025	(Norway) Vikersund	Vikersundbakken HS240	FH

== See also ==
- List of Olympic medalists in ski jumping
- List of Youth Olympic Games gold medalists who won Olympic gold medals
