= FIS Ski Flying World Championships 2024 – Team =

Team at the FIS Ski Flying World Championships 2024
- Venue: Kulm
- Location: Tauplitz/Bad Mitterndorf, Austria
- Dates: 28 January
- Competitors: 36 from 9 nations
- Teams: 9
- Winning points: 1,615.4

Medalists
gold medal	Lovro Kos; Domen Prevc; Peter Prevc; Timi Zajc	Slovenia
silver medal	Michael Hayböck; Manuel Fettner; Jan Hörl; Stefan Kraft	Austria
bronze medal	Pius Paschke; Karl Geiger; Stephan Leyhe; Andreas Wellinger	Germany

The Team competition at the FIS Ski Flying World Championships 2024 was held on 28 January 2024.

Slovenia defended their title, ahead of Austria and Germany.

== Results ==
The first round started at 14:00 and the final round at 15:05.

Rank	Bib	Country	Round 1			Final round			Total
Rank	Bib	Country	Distance (m)	Points	Rank	Distance (m)	Points	Rank	Points
1st place, gold medalist(s)	4	Slovenia; Lovro Kos; Domen Prevc; Peter Prevc; Timi Zajc	231.0; 226.0; 232.0; 226.5	860.2; 216.9; 211.7; 213.2; 218.4	1	208.0; 213.5; 194.0; 202.0	755.2; 199.4; 205.1; 177.6; 173.1	2	1,615.4
2nd place, silver medalist(s)	9	Austria; Michael Hayböck; Manuel Fettner; Jan Hörl; Stefan Kraft	228.0; 218.5; 212.0; 218.5	828.3; 215.6; 203.7; 196.6; 212.4	2	224.5; 210.0; 177.0; 221.5	760.6; 220.8; 198.8; 151.3; 189.7	1	1,588.9
3rd place, bronze medalist(s)	8	Germany; Pius Paschke; Karl Geiger; Stephan Leyhe; Andreas Wellinger	229.5; 224.5; 198.5; 219.5	815.0; 219.0; 210.3; 175.8; 209.9	3	211.5; 207.0; 164.5; 229.5	734.9; 197.1; 192.3; 138.3; 207.2	3	1,549.9
4	6	Norway; Robin Pedersen; Daniel-André Tande; Marius Lindvik; Johann André Forfang	209.0; 194.0; 230.0; 232.0	795.1; 190.0; 172.2; 209.0; 223.9	4	206.0; 183.5; 182.0; 225.0	707.8; 192.0; 163.9; 158.9; 193.0	5	1,502.9
5	5	Japan; Ren Nikaido; Naoki Nakamura; Junshirō Kobayashi; Ryōyū Kobayashi	214.0; 189.5; 200.5; 233.5	758.3; 189.7; 164.4; 171.2; 233.0	6	206.5; 187.0; 198.5; 224.5	734.7; 188.5; 169.3; 177.2; 199.7	4	1,493.0
6	3	Switzerland; Sandro Hauswirth; Simon Ammann; Remo Imhof; Gregor Deschwanden	204.0; 198.5; 197.0; 215.0	723.0; 178.5; 171.8; 166.7; 206.0	7	190.0; 200.5; 186.0; 200.0	666.3; 161.7; 177.0; 161.8; 165.8	6	1,389.3
7	2	Finland; Eetu Nousiainen; Kasperi Valto; Antti Aalto; Niko Kytösaho	191.0; 193.5; 185.0; 215.5	678.5; 163.9; 162.3; 149.8; 202.5	8	191.0; 175.5; 175.5; 198.5	621.9; 168.0; 144.9; 136.2; 172.8	7	1,300.4
8	4	Poland; Aleksander Zniszczoł; Kamil Stoch; Dawid Kubacki; Piotr Żyła	221.5; 211.0; 206.5; 212.5	778.3; 205.0; 192.0; 181.1; 200.2	5	DSQ; 210.0; 195.0; 177.5	500.8; 0.0; 197.3; 168.3; 135.2	8	1,279.1
9	1	United States; Erik Belshaw; Kevin Bickner; Decker Dean; Tate Frantz	207.5; 189.0; 167.5; 197.0	647.2; 185.1; 155.7; 131.7; 174.7	9	Did not advance			647.2
