= Mackenzie Boyd-Clowes =

Canadian ski jumper (born 1991)

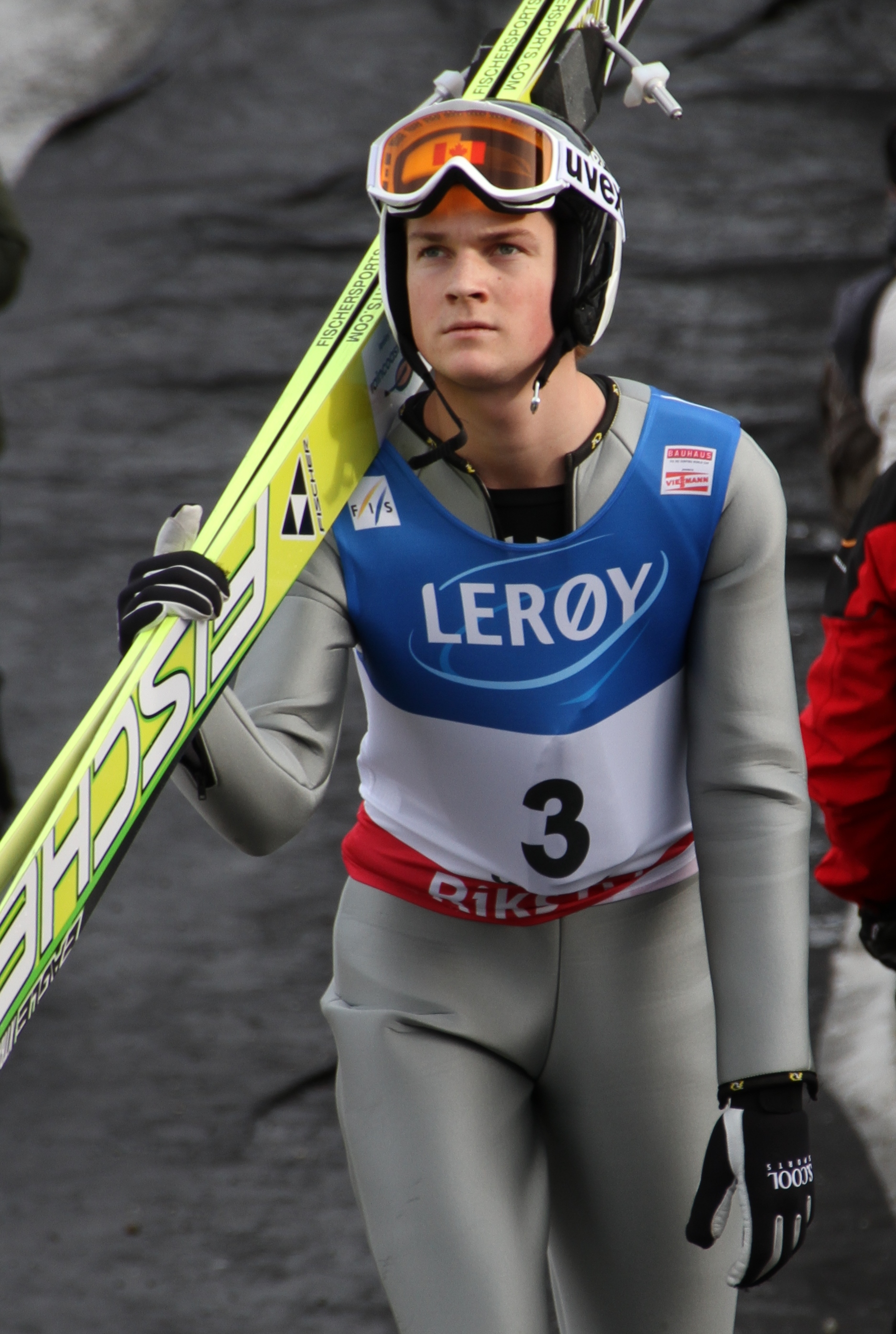

Personal information
- Full name: Mackenzie; James Boyd-Clowes
- Nationality: Canada
- Born: 13 July 1991 (age 35) Toronto, Ontario, Canada
- Height: 1.81 m (5 ft 11 in)

Sport
- Sport: Skiing
- Club: Altius Nordic Ski Club

World Cup career
- Seasons: 2009–2014; 2016– 2026
- Indiv. starts: 167
- Team starts: 4

Achievements and titles
- Personal bests: 224 m (735 ft); Planica, 17 March 2016
Medal record
Winter Olympics
Bronze medal – third place	2022 Beijing	Mixed team
- Updated on 6 March 2022

Mackenzie James Boyd-Clowes (born 13 July 1991) is a Canadian former ski jumper.

== Career ==
=== 2009: World Cup debut ===
Mackenzie was raised in Calgary, Alberta, where he trained on the ski jumps at Canada Olympic Park. He made his world cup debut in 2009 in Vancouver, where he took 42nd place. He performed at FIS Nordic World Ski Championships 2009 in Liberec, Czech Republic, where he finished 46th at individual large hill event.

=== 2010: First Olympics ===
At his first and home 2010 Winter Olympics in Vancouver, he finished 44th in the individual normal hill, 36th in the individual large hill and 12th place at the large hill team event. He performed at FIS Nordic World Ski Championships 2011 in Oslo, Norway, where he finished 39th at individual large hill event.

=== 2012: Ski flying world championships ===
He performed at FIS Ski Flying World Championships 2012 in Vikersund, Norway, where he finished 36th at individual flying hill event. He set the Canadian ski flying national record at 205 metres (673 ft), which he jumped in Harrachov, Czech Republic in 2013 and improved in three years later.

=== 2014: Second Olympics ===
His best World Cup result is 9th place at ski flying individual event in Bad Mitterndorf in January 2014, in a discipline which he likes the most. At the 2014 Winter Olympics in Sochi, Russia, he finished 37th in the individual normal hill, 25th in the individual large hill and 12th place at the large hill team event.

=== 2016: Return after break ===
After one season break, he returned to the world cup in the 2015/16 season. He improved his own Canadian ski flying national record two times at 216.5 metres (710 ft) which he jumped in Kulm, Austria at the training round of FIS Ski Flying World Championships 2016 where he finished 27th place individual. He lives in Calgary, Alberta, Canada.

=== 2018 Winter Olympics ===
Boyd-Clowes was named to his third Olympic team on January 24, 2018.

=== 2022 Winter Olympics ===
In January 2022, Boyd-Clowes was named to Canada's 2022 Olympic team.

On February 7, Boyd-Clowes won the bronze medal as part of Canada's entry into the mixed team competition. This was Canada's first ever Olympic medal in the sport of ski jumping.

== Major tournament results ==
=== Winter Olympics ===
Year	Place	Individual		Team	
Year	Place	Normal	Large	Men	Mixed
2010	(Canada) Vancouver	q	q	12	N/A
2014	(Russia) Sochi	37	25	12	N/A
2018	(South Korea) Pyeongchang	26	21	—	N/A
2022	(China) Beijing	16	33	—	3rd place, bronze medalist(s)
2026	(Italy) Milan	45	45	—	—

=== FIS Nordic World Ski Championships ===
Year	Place	Individual		Team		
Year	Place	Normal	Large	Normal	Large	Mixed
2009	(Czech Republic) Liberec	q	46	N/A	—	N/A
2011	(Norway) Oslo	DNS	39	—	—	—
2013	(Italy) Predazzo	did not participate				
2015	(Sweden) Falun	did not participate				
2017	(Finland) Lahti	39	38	N/A	—	12
2019	(Austria) Seefeld	32	27	N/A	—	—
2021	(Germany) Oberstdorf	34	28	N/A	—	10

=== FIS Ski Flying World Championships ===
Year	Place	Individual	Team
2010	(Slovenia) Planica	—	—
2012	(Norway) Vikersund	36	—
2014	(Czech Republic) Harrachov	30	N/A
2016	(Austria) Tauplitz	27	—
2018	(Germany) Oberstdorf	36	—
2020	(Slovenia) Planica	23	—
2022	(Norway) Vikersund		

== World Cup ==
=== Standings ===
Season	Overall	4H	SF	RA	W6	T5	P7	NT
2008/09	—	—	—	N/A	N/A	N/A	N/A	—
2009/10	—	—	—	N/A	N/A	N/A	N/A	—
2010/11	71	—	—	N/A	N/A	N/A	N/A	N/A
2011/12	68	42	—	N/A	N/A	N/A	N/A	N/A
2012/13	55	62	34	N/A	N/A	N/A	N/A	N/A
2013/14	55	43	16	N/A	N/A	N/A	N/A	N/A
2015/16	44	56	22	N/A	N/A	N/A	N/A	N/A
2016/17	41	40	—	56	N/A	N/A	N/A	N/A
2017/18	47	47	—	33	25	N/A	64	N/A
2018/19	51	47	40	34	45	N/A	58	N/A
2019/20	50	40	—	49	34	30	N/A	N/A
2020/21	32	37	—	N/A	27	N/A	50	N/A
2021/22	58	33		42	N/A	N/A		N/A

=== Individual starts (167) ===
Season	1	2	3	4	5	6	7	8	9	10	11	12	13	14	15	16	17	18	19	20	21	22	23	24	25	26	27	28	29	Points
2008/09																														0
2008/09	–	–	–	–	–	–	–	–	–	–	–	–	–	–	–	42	49	–	48	–	q	–	–	–	–	–	–			0
2009/10																														0
2009/10	–	q	–	q	q	q	–	–	–	–	–	–	45	–	–	–	–	–	–	–	–	–	–							0
2010/11																														5
2010/11	–	–	–	–	–	–	–	–	–	–	–	–	–	28	29	–	–	–	–	–	q	–	–	48	q	–				5
2011/12																														5
2011/12	–	–	–	–	–	–	–	42	46	33	37	–	–	–	–	28	43	–	–	–	–	–	q	29	q	–				5
2012/13																														27
2012/13	q	–	q	44	38	–	–	q	q	q	47	45	39	–	–	–	–	19	24	–	–	–	–	–	–	–	–	–		27
2013/14																														62
2013/14	–	q	–	47	37	36	24	25	26	q	36	q	9	36	16	44	–	–	–	–	q	–	41	36	37	41	45	–		62
2015/16																														50
2015/16	29	37	41	–	–	31	47	q	44	q	34	20	–	DQ	46	46	29	38	22	31	41	33	–	–	30	34	18	19	–	50
2016/17																														52
2016/17	32	35	12	36	21	38	29	36	31	21	q	43	41	35	–	DQ	39	28	–	34	26	q	41	q	39	–				52
2017/18																														31
2017/18	–	41	q	–	44	q	–	34	43	q	39	51	–	28	33	32	15	27	44	DS	q	–								31
2018/19	Wisła	Kuusamo	Kuusamo	Nizhny Tagil	Nizhny Tagil	Engelberg	Engelberg	Oberstdorf	Garmisch-Partenkirchen	Innsbruck	Bischofshofen	Val di Fiemme	Val di Fiemme	Zakopane	Sapporo	Sapporo	Oberstdorf	Oberstdorf	Oberstdorf	Lahti	Willingen	Willingen	Oslo	Lillehammer	Trondheim	Vikersund	Planica	Planica		18
2018/19	37	27	45	31	38	29	28	31	q	q	38	38	48	35	–	–	q	q	q	39	46	48	46	29	31	24	q	–		18
2019/20	Wisła	Kuusamo	Nizhny Tagil	Nizhny Tagil	Klingenthal	Engelberg	Engelberg	Oberstdorf	Garmisch-Partenkirchen	Innsbruck	Bischofshofen	Val di Fiemme	Val di Fiemme	Titisee-Neustadt	Titisee-Neustadt	Zakopane	Sapporo	Sapporo	Willingen	Tauplitz	Tauplitz	Râșnov	Râșnov	Lahti	Lahti	Oslo	Lillehammer			20
2019/20	41	46	q	42	48	q	17	39	37	37	42	44	40	30	32	q	29	48	40	34	q	–	–	35	28	32	q			20
2020/21	Wisła	Ruka	Ruka	Nizhny Tagil	Nizhny Tagil	Engelberg	Engelberg	Oberstdorf	Garmisch-Partenkirchen	Innsbruck	Bischofshofen	Titisee-Neustadt	Titisee-Neustadt	Zakopane	Lahti	Willingen	Willingen	Klingenthal	Klingenthal	Zakopane	Zakopane	Râșnov	Planica	Planica	Planica					115
2020/21	9	34	38	–	–	15	6	47	23	29	q	27	35	26	25	30	36	40	35	35	27	–	q	44	–					115
2021/22	Nizhny Tagil	Nizhny Tagil	Ruka	Ruka	Wisła	Klingenthal	Klingenthal	Engelberg	Engelberg	Oberstdorf	Garmisch-Partenkirchen	Bischofshofen	Bischofshofen	Bischofshofen	Zakopane	Titisee-Neustadt	Titisee-Neustadt	Willingen	Willingen	Lahti	Lahti	Lillehammer	Oslo	Oslo	Oberstdorf	Oberstdorf	Planica	Planica		15
2021/22	30	36	q	37	q	32	33	41	33	25	45	q	DQ	31	26	39	32	30	32	–	–	40	q	29						15
