= Stephan Leyhe =

German ski jumper (born 1992)

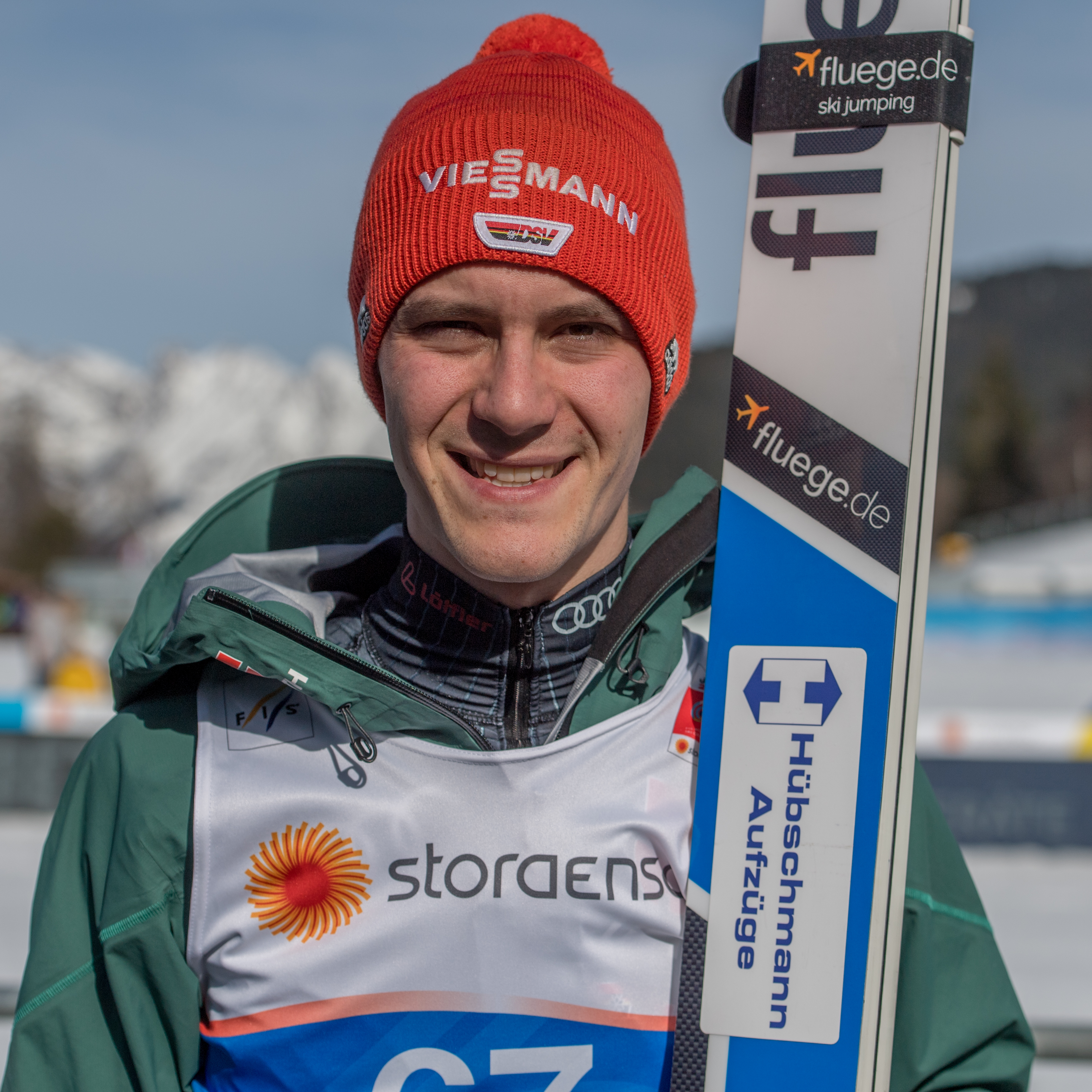
- Leyhe in 2019

Personal information
- Nationality: Germany
- Born: 5 January 1992 (age 34) Schwalefeld, Germany
- Height: 1.82 m (6 ft 0 in)

Sport
- Sport: Skiing
- Club: SC Willingen

World Cup career
- Seasons: 2015–2020, 2021–2025
- Indiv. starts: 194
- Indiv. podiums: 6
- Indiv. wins: 1
- Team starts: 17
- Team podiums: 14
- Team wins: 4

Achievements and titles
- Personal bests: 224.0 m (734.9 ft); Vikersund, 18 March 2018
Medal record
Representing Germany
Men's ski jumping
Olympic Games
Silver medal – second place	2018 Pyeongchang	Team LH
Bronze medal – third place	2022 Beijing	Team LH
World Championships
Gold medal – first place	2019 Seefeld	Team LH
Men's ski flying
World Championships
Bronze medal – third place	2024 Bad Mitterndorf	Team
- Updated on 25 November 2023

Stephan Leyhe (German pronunciation: [ʃtɛfan laɪɛ]; born 5 January 1992) is a German former ski jumper and representative of the SC Willingen club. Team silver (2018) and bronze (2022) Olympic medalist, gold medalist of the 2019 Nordic Ski World Championships, silver medalist of the 2016 Ski Flying World Championships and the 2010 and 2011 Junior World Championships.

Leyhe made his World Cup debut in Engelberg on 20 December 2014. To date he has won one individual competition on 8 February 2020 in Willingen, where he comes from, as well as a third-place overall finish at the 2018–19 Four Hills Tournament.

== Record ==
=== Olympic Games ===
Event	Normal hill	Large hill	Team LH
(South Korea) 2018 Pyeongchang	—	—	2nd place, silver medalist(s)
(China) 2022 Beijing	24	—	3rd place, bronze medalist(s)

=== FIS World Nordic Ski Championships ===
Event	Normal hill	Large hill	Team LH	Mixed Team NH
(Finland) 2017 Lahti	13	16	4	—
(Austria) 2019 Seefeld	6	—	1st place, gold medalist(s)	—
(Norway) 2025 Trondheim			4	

=== FIS Ski Flying World Championships ===
Event	Individual	Team
(Austria) 2016 Bad Mitterndorf	19	2nd place, silver medalist(s)
(Germany) 2018 Oberstdorf	20	4
(Austria) 2024 Bad Mitterndorf	10	3rd place, bronze medalist(s)

== World Cup ==
=== Season standings ===
Season				Tour Standings			
Season	Overall	4H	SF	RA	W5	T5	P7
2014/15	38	14	37	N/A	N/A	N/A	N/A
2015/16	23	20	29	N/A	N/A	N/A	N/A
2016/17	22	8	42	27	N/A	N/A	N/A
2017/18	18	13	23	25	14	N/A	15
2018/19	11	3rd place, bronze medalist(s)	29	47	28	N/A	—
2019/20	6	10	13	5	1st place, gold medalist(s)	3rd place, bronze medalist(s)	N/A

=== Individual wins ===
No.	Season	Date	Location	Hill	Size
1	2019/20	8 February 2020	(Germany) Willingen	Mühlenkopfschanze HS145 (night)	LH

=== Individual starts ===
Season	1	2	3	4	5	6	7	8	9	10	11	12	13	14	15	16	17	18	19	20	21	22	23	24	25	26	27	28	29	30	31	Points
2014/15	Klingenthal	Kuusamo	Kuusamo	Lillehammer	Lillehammer	Nizhny Tagil	Nizhny Tagil	Engelberg	Engelberg	Oberstdorf	Garmisch-Partenkirchen	Innsbruck	Bischofshofen	Tauplitz	Wisła	Zakopane	Sapporo	Sapporo	Willingen	Willingen	Titisee-Neustadt	Titisee-Neustadt	Vikersund	Vikersund	Lahti	Kuopio	Trondheim	Oslo	Oslo	Planica	Planica	120
2014/15	–	–	–	–	–	–	–	13	22	19	16	15	26	33	35	24	42	18	24	48	32	39	25	21	–	–	–	–	–	35	31	120
2015/16	Klingenthal	Lillehammer	Lillehammer	Nizhny Tagil	Nizhny Tagil	Engelberg	Engelberg	Oberstdorf	Garmisch-Partenkirchen	Innsbruck	Bischofshofen	Willingen	Zakopane	Sapporo	Sapporo	Trondheim	Vikersund	Vikersund	Vikersund	Lahti	Lahti	Kuopio	Almaty	Almaty	Wisła	Titisee-Neustadt	Planica	Planica	Planica			257
2015/16	20	39	19	27	22	23	15	14	17	21	45	23	18	9	39	37	36	26	q	41	12	26	15	11	38	16	19	30	26			257
2016/17	Kuusamo	Kuusamo	Klingenthal	Lillehammer	Lillehammer	Engelberg	Engelberg	Oberstdorf	Garmisch-Partenkirchen	Innsbruck	Bischofshofen	Wisła	Wisła	Zakopane	Willingen	Oberstdorf	Oberstdorf	Sapporo	Sapporo	Pyeongchang	Pyeongchang	Oslo	Trondheim	Vikersund	Planica	Planica						308
2016/17	43	19	19	15	18	14	26	17	8	11	8	25	20	16	20	34	29	–	–	5	12	18	28	q	37	29						308
2017/18	Wisła	Kuusamo	Nizhny Tagil	Nizhny Tagil	Titisee-Neustadt	Engelberg	Engelberg	Oberstdorf	Garmisch-Partenkirchen	Innsbruck	Bischofshofen	Tauplitz	Zakopane	Willingen	Willingen	Lahti	Oslo	Lillehammer	Trondheim	Vikersund	Planica	Planica										327
2017/18	10	9	40	17	16	25	18	24	10	9	19	20	13	16	18	20	7	26	20	15	20	30										327
2018/19	Wisła	Kuusamo	Kuusamo	Nizhny Tagil	Nizhny Tagil	Engelberg	Engelberg	Oberstdorf	Garmisch-Partenkirchen	Innsbruck	Bischofshofen	Val di Fiemme	Val di Fiemme	Zakopane	Sapporo	Sapporo	Oberstdorf	Oberstdorf	Oberstdorf	Lahti	Willingen	Willingen	Oslo	Lillehammer	Trondheim	Vikersund	Planica	Planica				636
2018/19	2	16	6	4	25	6	11	13	7	4	4	5	18	7	9	8	11	35	17	16	35	22	–	23	34	–	–	–				636
2019/20	Wisła	Kuusamo	Nizhny Tagil	Nizhny Tagil	Klingenthal	Engelberg	Engelberg	Oberstdorf	Garmisch-Partenkirchen	Innsbruck	Bischofshofen	Val di Fiemme	Val di Fiemme	Titisee-Neustadt	Titisee-Neustadt	Zakopane	Sapporo	Sapporo	Willingen	Tauplitz	Tauplitz	Râșnov	Râșnov	Lahti	Lahti	Lillehammer	Lillehammer					917
2019/20	34	33	10	17	19	10	13	16	5	8	18	6	13	5	4	4	5	2	1	15	10	2	7	16	5	3	9					917

=== Podiums ===
Season	Podiums			
Season	Medals			Total
Season	1st place, gold medalist(s)	2nd place, silver medalist(s)	3rd place, bronze medalist(s)	
2014/15	-	-	-	-
2015/16	-	-	-	-
2016/17	-	-	-	-
2017/18	-	-	-	-
2018/19	-	1	-	1
2019/20	1	2	1	4
Total	1	3	1	5
