= FIS Nordic World Ski Championships 2019 – Team large hill =

Team large hill at the FIS Nordic World Ski Championships 2019
- Location: Seefeld in Tirol, Austria
- Dates: 24 February
- Competitors: 48 from 12 nations
- Teams: 12
- Winning points: 987.5

Medalists
gold medal	Karl Geiger; Richard Freitag; Stephan Leyhe; Markus Eisenbichler	Germany
silver medal	Philipp Aschenwald; Michael Hayböck; Daniel Huber; Stefan Kraft	Austria
bronze medal	Yukiya Satō; Daiki Itō; Junshirō Kobayashi; Ryōyū Kobayashi	Japan

The Team large hill competition at the FIS Nordic World Ski Championships 2019 was held on 24 February 2019.

== Results ==
The first round was started at 14:45 and the final round at 15:55.

Rank	Bib	Country	Round 1			Final round			Total
Rank	Bib	Country	Distance (m)	Points	Rank	Distance (m)	Points	Rank	Points
1st place, gold medalist(s)	11	Germany; Karl Geiger; Richard Freitag; Stephan Leyhe; Markus Eisenbichler	129.0; 121.0; 126.0; 128.0	487.0; 127.6; 113.3; 115.9; 130.2	1	130.0; 120.0; 128.5; 128.5	500.5; 132.2; 114.9; 124.3; 129.1	1	987.5
2nd place, silver medalist(s)	9	Austria; Philipp Aschenwald; Michael Hayböck; Daniel Huber; Stefan Kraft	117.0; 122.5; 126.5; 125.0	462.8; 107.3; 111.6; 119.8; 124.1	2	118.0; 120.5; 126.5; 123.5	468.1; 109.3; 115.7; 120.2; 122.9	2	930.9
3rd place, bronze medalist(s)	10	Japan; Yukiya Satō; Daiki Itō; Junshirō Kobayashi; Ryōyū Kobayashi	119.5; 117.0; 127.0; 127.0	454.2; 109.6; 100.9; 115.7; 128.0	3	125.0; 116.0; 126.0; 123.0	466.0; 121.0; 105.5; 117.3; 122.2	4	920.2
4	12	Poland; Piotr Żyła; Stefan Hula; Dawid Kubacki; Kamil Stoch	121.5; 113.5; 127.0; 125.0	451.8; 114.8; 92.7; 120.2; 124.1	4	119.5; 116.5; 126.5; 122.5	457.3; 112.6; 105.1; 117.4; 122.2	5	909.1
5	8	Norway; Halvor Egner Granerud; Andreas Stjernen; Johann André Forfang; Robert Johansson	117.5; 123.5; 122.0; 117.5	432.9; 107.7; 113.6; 108.5; 103.1	5	121.5; 120.5; 127.0; 121.0	467.3; 115.7; 112.3; 120.3; 119.0	3	900.2
6	7	Slovenia; Anže Lanišek; Peter Prevc; Žiga Jelar; Timi Zajc	117.0; 123.0; 117.0; 121.0	422.3; 102.7; 112.2; 97.2; 110.2	6	118.0; 120.0; 119.0; 117.0	436.4; 110.4; 110.6; 105.8; 109.6	6	858.7
7	6	Switzerland; Andreas Schuler; Luca Egloff; Simon Ammann; Killian Peier	112.0; 111.5; 125.5; 127.0	413.7; 90.4; 84.9; 111.3; 127.1	7	108.0; 110.5; 123.0; 128.5	423.3; 90.5; 87.3; 111.9; 133.6	7	837.0
8	5	Czech Republic; Viktor Polášek; Tomáš Vančura; Čestmír Kožíšek; Roman Koudelka	119.0; 118.0; 118.5; 120.5	412.7; 107.4; 97.6; 98.1; 109.6	8	121.5; 106.0; 112.0; 122.0	405.7; 114.0; 83.3; 91.5; 116.9	8	818.4
9	4	Russia; Denis Kornilov; Dmitry Vassiliev; Roman Trofimov; Evgeniy Klimov	109.5; 111.5; 115.0; 123.5	370.9; 82.5; 83.7; 89.4; 115.3	9	did not advance			
10	3	Finland; Jarkko Määttä; Andreas Alamommo; Eetu Nousiainen; Antti Aalto	110.5; 106.5; 115.5; 118.0	354.1; 83.6; 76.7; 90.8; 103.2	10	did not advance			
11	2	United States; Patrick Gasienica; Andrew Urlaub; Kevin Bickner; Casey Larson	103.0; 111.0; 121.0; 113.0	342.5; 69.9; 83.3; 101.4; 87.9	11	did not advance			
12	1	Kazakhstan; Gleb Safonov; Sabirzhan Muminov; Sergey Tkachenko; Nikita Devyatkin	75.0; 102.5; 116.0; 84.0	214.6; 16.2; 70.1; 96.3; 32.0	12	did not advance			
