= Kevin Bickner =

American ski jumper (born 1996)

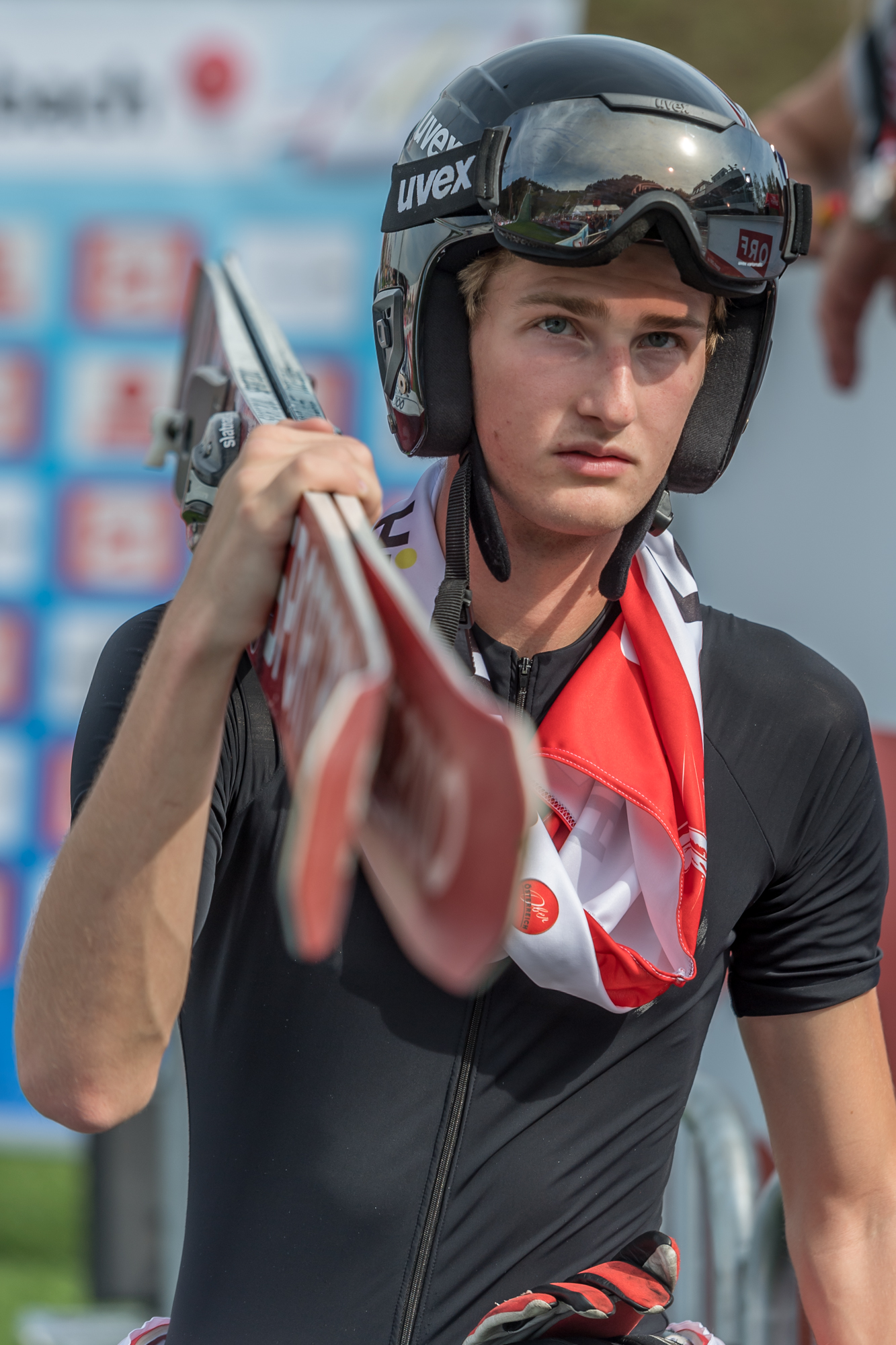

Personal information
- Nationality: United States
- Born: September 23, 1996 (age 30) Chicago, Illinois, U.S.

Sport
- Sport: Ski jumping
- Club: Norge Ski Club

World Cup career
- Seasons: 2015–2020, 2022, 2024–present
- Indiv. starts: 122
- Team starts: 16

Achievements and titles
- Personal bests: 244.5 m (802 ft); Vikersund, March 19, 2017
- Updated on 29 March 2026

Kevin Bickner (born September 23, 1996) is an American ski jumper. He is the current national record holder, with 244.5 metres (802 ft) set in Vikersund on March 19, 2017.

== Career ==
In the 2014/15 season, Bickner made his World Cup debut but did not qualify to the main event in Lahti. He scored first World Cup points in the 2016/17 season and finished at 23rd place in Klingenthal.

In 2017, Bickner performed at his first Nordic World Championships in Lahti and finished 30th place at large hill individual, 47th place at normal hill individual, 8th place at mixed normal hill and 11th place at team large hill.

In 2018, he participated in his first Winter Olympics in Pyeongchang and finished 18th place at normal hill individual, 20th place at large hill individual, and 9th place at team large hill.

== Major tournament results ==
=== Winter Olympics ===
Year	Place	Individual		Team		
Year	Place	Normal	Large	Men	Super	Mixed
2018	(South Korea) Pyeongchang	18	20	9	N/A	N/A
2022	(China) Beijing	43	39	10	N/A	—
2026	(Italy) Milano Cortina	33	20	N/A	8	7

=== FIS Nordic World Ski Championships ===
Year	Place	Individual		Team	
Year	Place	Normal	Large	Men	Mixed
2017	(Finland) Lahti	47	30	11	8
2019	(Austria) Seefeld	48	37	11	10
2025	(Norway) Trondheim	32	32	8	6

=== FIS Ski Flying World Championships ===
Year	Place	Individual	Team
2018	(Germany) Oberstdorf	24	—
2024	(Austria) Bad Mitterndorf	37	9

== World Cup ==
=== Standings ===
Season	Overall	4H	SF	RA	W6	T5	P7
2014/15	—	—	—	N/A	N/A	N/A	N/A
2015/16	77	—	44	N/A	N/A	N/A	N/A
2016/17	42	45	29	31	N/A	N/A	N/A
2017/18	39	51	28	33	29	N/A	29
2018/19	51	55	—	58	—	N/A	61
2019/20	54	37	—	41	—	46	N/A
2021/22	—	—	—	49	N/A	N/A	—
2023/24	—	—	—	—	N/A	N/A	—
2024/25	28	28	40	47	N/A	N/A	29
2025/26	36	38	25	N/A	N/A	N/A	42

=== Individual starts (122) ===
Season	1	2	3	4	5	6	7	8	9	10	11	12	13	14	15	16	17	18	19	20	21	22	23	24	25	26	27	28	29	30	31	32	Points
2014/15	Klingenthal	Kuusamo	Kuusamo	Lillehammer	Lillehammer	Nizhny Tagil	Nizhny Tagil	Engelberg	Engelberg	Oberstdorf	Garmisch-Partenkirchen	Innsbruck	Bischofshofen	Tauplitz	Wisła	Zakopane	Sapporo	Sapporo	Willingen	Willingen	Titisee-Neustadt	Titisee-Neustadt	Vikersund	Vikersund	Lahti	Kuopio	Trondheim	Oslo	Oslo	Planica	Planica		0
2014/15	–	–	–	–	–	–	–	–	–	–	–	–	–	–	–	–	–	–	–	–	–	–	–	–	q	–	–	–	–	–	–		0
2015/16	Klingenthal	Lillehammer	Lillehammer	Nizhny Tagil	Nizhny Tagil	Engelberg	Engelberg	Oberstdorf	Garmisch-Partenkirchen	Innsbruck	Bischofshofen	Willingen	Zakopane	Sapporo	Sapporo	Trondheim	Vikersund	Vikersund	Vikersund	Lahti	Lahti	Kuopio	Almaty	Almaty	Wisła	Titisee-Neustadt	Planica	Planica	Planica				1
2015/16	q	51	–	–	–	–	–	–	–	–	–	DQ	–	39	q	q	53	q	30	–	–	–	–	–	46	–	32	q	–				1
2016/17	Kuusamo	Kuusamo	Klingenthal	Lillehammer	Lillehammer	Engelberg	Engelberg	Oberstdorf	Garmisch-Partenkirchen	Innsbruck	Bischofshofen	Wisła	Wisła	Zakopane	Willingen	Oberstdorf	Oberstdorf	Sapporo	Sapporo	Pyeongchang	Pyeongchang	Oslo	Trondheim	Vikersund	Planica	Planica							50
2016/17	46	38	23	DQ	48	41	41	q	32	35	41	48	43	45	–	24	26	21	27	43	46	q	q	15	q	–							50
2017/18	Wisła	Kuusamo	Nizhny Tagil	Nizhny Tagil	Titisee-Neustadt	Engelberg	Engelberg	Oberstdorf	Garmisch-Partenkirchen	Innsbruck	Bischofshofen	Tauplitz	Zakopane	Willingen	Willingen	Lahti	Oslo	Lillehammer	Trondheim	Vikersund	Planica	Planica											50
2017/18	–	q	q	q	q	–	–	–	–	–	26	24	–	25	33	20	36	34	26	30	15	–											50
2018/19	Wisła	Kuusamo	Kuusamo	Nizhny Tagil	Nizhny Tagil	Engelberg	Engelberg	Oberstdorf	Garmisch-Partenkirchen	Innsbruck	Bischofshofen	Val di Fiemme	Val di Fiemme	Zakopane	Sapporo	Sapporo	Oberstdorf	Oberstdorf	Oberstdorf	Lahti	Willingen	Willingen	Oslo	Lillehammer	Trondheim	Vikersund	Planica	Planica					18
2018/19	42	59	49	18	26	34	33	q	37	39	q	q	46	q	37	q	37	q	q	–	q	–	q	q	45	q	q	–					18
2019/20	Wisła	Kuusamo	Nizhny Tagil	Nizhny Tagil	Klingenthal	Engelberg	Engelberg	Oberstdorf	Garmisch-Partenkirchen	Innsbruck	Bischofshofen	Val di Fiemme	Val di Fiemme	Titisee-Neustadt	Titisee-Neustadt	Zakopane	Sapporo	Sapporo	Willingen	Tauplitz	Tauplitz	Râșnov	Râșnov	Lahti	Lahti	Oslo	Lillehammer						14
2019/20	q	45	q	q	–	38	22	42	26	45	q	q	35	45	46	39	50	49	–	–	–	–	–	q	49	33	41						14
2021/22	Nizhny Tagil	Nizhny Tagil	Ruka	Ruka	Wisła	Klingenthal	Klingenthal	Engelberg	Engelberg	Oberstdorf	Garmisch-Partenkirchen	Bischofshofen	Bischofshofen	Bischofshofen	Zakopane	Titisee-Neustadt	Titisee-Neustadt	Willingen	Willingen	Lahti	Lahti	Lillehammer	Oslo	Oslo	Oberstdorf	Oberstdorf	Planica	Planica					0
2021/22	–	–	–	–	q	q	q	q	q	–	q	–	–	–	q	–	–	–	–	56	q	46	q	46	–	–	–	–					0
2023–24	Kuusamo	Kuusamo	Lillehammer	Lillehammer	Klingenthal	Klingenthal	Engelberg	Engelberg	Oberstdorf	Garmisch-Partenkirchen	Innsbruck	Bischofshofen	Wisła	Zakopane	Willingen	Willingen	Lake Placid	Lake Placid	Sapporo	Sapporo	Oberstdorf	Oberstdorf	Lahti	Lahti	Oslo	Oslo	Trondheim	Trondheim	Vikersund	Vikersund	Planica	Planica	0
2023–24	–	–	–	–	–	–	–	–	–	–	–	–	–	–	41	41	43	43	–	–	q	q	–	–	–	–	–	–	–	–	–	–	0
2024–25	Lillehammer	Lillehammer	Kuusamo	Kuusamo	Wisła	Wisła	Titisee-Neustadt	Titisee-Neustadt	Engelberg	Engelberg	Oberstdorf	Garmisch-Partenkirchen	Innsbruck	Bischofshofen	Zakopane	Oberstdorf	Oberstdorf	Willingen	Willingen	Lake Placid	Lake Placid	Sapporo	Sapporo	Oslo	Vikersund	Vikersund	Lahti	Planica	Planica				171
2024–25	32	24	q	42	–	–	33	38	34	30	22	DQ	22	14	15	25	24	10	35	13	14	18	13	48	q	43	45	47	30				171
2025–26	Lillehammer	Lillehammer	Falun	Falun	Ruka	Wisła	Wisła	Klingenthal	Klingenthal	Engelberg	Engelberg	Oberstdorf	Garmisch-Partenkirchen	Innsbruck	Bischofshofen	Zakopane	Sapporo	Sapporo	Willingen	Willingen	Bad Mitterndorf	Bad Mitterndorf	Lahti	Lahti	Oslo	Oslo	Vikersund	Planica	Planica				128
2025–26	35	31	q	30	24	30	45	21	39	32	29	43	46	48	46	10	q	50	25	46	10	27	52	26	12	14	q	37	–				128
