= Michael Hayböck =

Austrian ski jumper (born 1991)

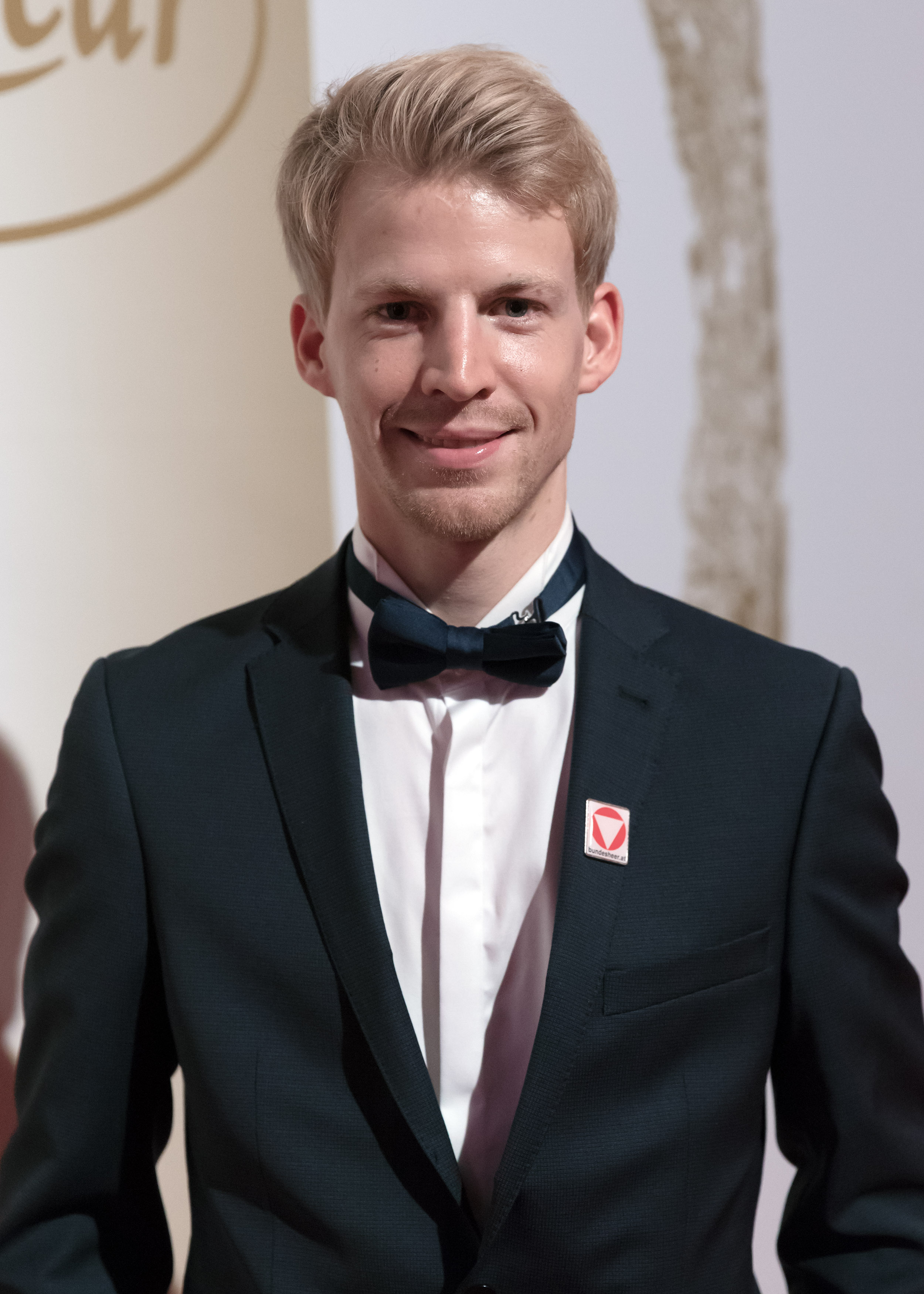
- Hayböck in 2017

Personal information
- Nationality: Austria
- Born: 5 March 1991 (age 35) Linz, Austria
- Height: 1.82 m (6 ft 0 in)

Sport
- Sport: Skiing
- Club: UVB Hinzenbach

World Cup career
- Seasons: 2010–2025
- Indiv. starts: 324
- Indiv. podiums: 26
- Indiv. wins: 5
- Team starts: 50
- Team podiums: 34
- Team wins: 12

Achievements and titles
- Personal bests: 245.5 m (805 ft); Planica, 11 December 2020
Medal record
Representing Austria
Men's ski jumping
Olympic Games
Silver medal – second place	2014 Sochi	Team LH
World Championships
Silver medal – second place	2015 Falun	Team LH
Silver medal – second place	2017 Lahti	Mixed team NH
Silver medal – second place	2019 Seefeld	Team LH
Bronze medal – third place	2017 Lahti	Team LH
Bronze medal – third place	2021 Oberstdorf	Mixed team NH
Bronze medal – third place	2023 Planica	Team LH
Men's ski flying
World Championships
Silver medal – second place	2024 Bad Mitterndorf	Team
Bronze medal – third place	2016 Bad Mitterndorf	Team
- Updated on 30 March 2025

Michael "Michi" Hayböck (Austrian German: [ˈmɪçaeːl ˈhaɪbœk]; born 5 March 1991) is an Austrian former ski jumper.

== Career ==
Hayböck became a junior world ski jump champion at Hinterzarten in 2010. He took his first senior World Cup win on 6 January 2015 in Bischofshofen in the final event of the Four Hills Tournament 2014/15. Just a few days earlier in the same tournament, he had jumped 138 metres to set a hill record for the Bergisel Ski Jump.

Hayböck competed for Austria in both individual men's ski jumping events at the 2014 Winter Olympics in Sochi, Russia. He qualified for the finals in both events and placed 5th in the normal hill competition and 8th in the large hill. He was also part of the Austrian team who won a silver medal in the team large hill competition at the same games, along with Thomas Morgenstern, Thomas Diethart and Gregor Schlierenzauer.

He won a team silver medal with Stefan Kraft, Daniela Iraschko-Stolz, and Jacqueline Seifriedsberger in the mixed team competition at the 2017 Nordic World Ski Championships in Lahti. In the men's team competition he won bronze together with Stefan Kraft, Manuel Fettner, and Gregor Schlierenzauer.

On 1 January 2025, Michael set a new record at the Große Olympiaschanze in Garmisch-Partenkirchen with a jump of 145 meters, beating the previous record of 144 meters set by Dawid Kubacki four years prior.

== World Cup ==
=== Standings ===
Season	Overall	4H	SF	RA	W5	T5	P7	NT
2009/10	49	44	—	N/A	N/A	N/A	N/A	—
2010/11	56	40	31	N/A	N/A	N/A	N/A	N/A
2011/12	42	43	43	N/A	N/A	N/A	N/A	N/A
2012/13	34	28	24	N/A	N/A	N/A	N/A	N/A
2013/14	14	9	14	N/A	N/A	N/A	N/A	N/A
2014/15	5	2nd place, silver medalist(s)	13	N/A	N/A	N/A	N/A	N/A
2015/16	4	3rd place, bronze medalist(s)	8	N/A	N/A	N/A	N/A	N/A
2016/17	7	19	6	12	N/A	N/A	N/A	N/A
2017/18	23	14	25	17	—	N/A	52	N/A
2018/19	27	26	17	14	17	N/A	14	N/A
2019/20	22	18	14	19	25	26	N/A	N/A
2020/21	18	24	9	N/A	29	N/A	9	N/A
2021/22	37	39	12	—	N/A	N/A	14	N/A
2022/23	12	7	15	7	N/A	N/A	7	N/A
2023/24	6	6	10	5	N/A	N/A	18	N/A
2024/25	18	7	13	20	N/A	N/A	33	N/A

=== Wins ===
No.	Season	Date	Location	Hill	Size
1	2014/15	6 January 2015	(Austria) Bischofshofen	Paul-Ausserleitner-Schanze HS140 (night)	LH
2	2015/16	19 February 2016	(Finland) Lahti	Salpausselkä HS130 (night)	LH
3	2015/16	21 February 2016	(Finland) Lahti	Salpausselkä HS100	NH
4	2015/16	23 February 2016	(Finland) Kuopio	Puijo HS127 (night)	LH
5	2016/17	17 December 2016	(Switzerland) Engelberg	Gross-Titlis-Schanze HS140 (night)	LH

=== Individual starts (324) ===
Season	1	2	3	4	5	6	7	8	9	10	11	12	13	14	15	16	17	18	19	20	21	22	23	24	25	26	27	28	29	30	31	32	Points
2009/10	Kuusamo	Lillehammer	Lillehammer	Engelberg	Engelberg	Engelberg	Oberstdorf	Garmisch-Partenkirchen	Innsbruck	Bischofshofen	Bad Mitterndorf	Bad Mitterndorf	Sapporo	Sapporo	Zakopane	Zakopane	Oberstdorf	Klingenthal	Willingen	Lahti	Kuopio	Lillehammer	Oslo										54
2009/10	–	–	–	–	–	–	–	–	17	38	–	–	–	–	–	–	–	–	6	–	–	–	–										54
2010/11	Kuusamo	Kuopio	Lillehammer	Lillehammer	Engelberg	Engelberg	Engelberg	Oberstdorf	Garmisch-Partenkirchen	Innsbruck	Bischofshofen	Harrachov	Harrachov	Sapporo	Sapporo	Zakopane	Zakopane	Zakopane	Willingen	Klingenthal	Oberstdorf	Vikersund	Vikersund	Lahti	Planica	Planica							28
2010/11	–	–	35	22	25	23	34	32	48	34	39	–	–	26	41	–	–	–	–	–	–	q	q	–	–	–							28
2011/12	Kuusamo	Lillehammer	Lillehammer	Harrachov	Harrachov	Engelberg	Engelberg	Oberstdorf	Garmisch-Partenkirchen	Innsbruck	Bischofshofen	Bad Mitterndorf	Bad Mitterndorf	Zakopane	Zakopane	Sapporo	Sapporo	Predazzo	Predazzo	Willingen	Oberstdorf	Lahti	Trondheim	Oslo	Planica	Planica							70
2011/12	–	–	–	–	–	–	–	–	–	19	7	24	35	26	27	31	40	–	–	–	–	q	q	25	–	–							70
2012/13	Lillehammer	Lillehammer	Kuusamo	Krasnaja Polana	Krasnaja Polana	Engelberg	Engelberg	Oberstdorf	Garmisch-Partenkirchen	Innsbruck	Bischofshofen	Wisła	Zakopane	Sapporo	Sapporo	Vikersund	Vikersund	Harrachov	Harrachov	Klingenthal	Oberstdorf	Lahti	Kuopio	Trondheim	Oslo	Planica	Planica						163
2012/13	15	33	28	39	26	33	15	39	31	15	16	39	15	20	24	19	18	23	17	50	27	27	30	–	–	q	29						163
2013/14	Klingenthal	Kuusamo	Lillehammer	Lillehammer	Titisee-Neustadt	Titisee-Neustadt	Engelberg	Engelberg	Oberstdorf	Garmisch-Partenkirchen	Innsbruck	Bischofshofen	Tauplitz	Tauplitz	Wisła	Zakopane	Sapporo	Sapporo	Willingen	Willingen	Falun	Lahti	Lahti	Kuopio	Trondheim	Oslo	Planica	Planica					439
2013/14	–	–	–	–	–	–	–	–	7	24	34	14	10	16	3	7	–	–	13	19	15	7	7	6	8	16	15	14					439
2014/15	Klingenthal	Kuusamo	Kuusamo	Lillehammer	Lillehammer	Nizhny Tagil	Nizhny Tagil	Engelberg	Engelberg	Oberstdorf	Garmisch-Partenkirchen	Innsbruck	Bischofshofen	Tauplitz	Wisła	Zakopane	Sapporo	Sapporo	Willingen	Willingen	Titisee-Neustadt	Titisee-Neustadt	Vikersund	Vikersund	Lahti	Kuopio	Trondheim	Oslo	Oslo	Planica	Planica		1157
2014/15	9	5	5	3	3	9	5	3	3	2	7	6	1	16	4	5	4	10	20	18	15	9	–	–	9	7	4	13	29	7	6		1157
2015/16	Klingenthal	Lillehammer	Lillehammer	Nizhny Tagil	Nizhny Tagil	Engelberg	Engelberg	Oberstdorf	Garmisch-Partenkirchen	Innsbruck	Bischofshofen	Willingen	Zakopane	Sapporo	Sapporo	Trondheim	Vikersund	Vikersund	Vikersund	Lahti	Lahti	Kuopio	Almaty	Almaty	Wisła	Titisee-Neustadt	Planica	Planica	Planica				1301
2015/16	18	13	8	28	2	9	2	2	5	5	3	37	2	–	–	4	6	8	9	1	1	1	2	5	8	41	7	4	6				1301
2016/17	Kuusamo	Kuusamo	Klingenthal	Lillehammer	Lillehammer	Engelberg	Engelberg	Oberstdorf	Garmisch-Partenkirchen	Innsbruck	Bischofshofen	Wisła	Wisła	Zakopane	Willingen	Oberstdorf	Oberstdorf	Sapporo	Sapporo	Pyeongchang	Pyeongchang	Oslo	Trondheim	Vikersund	Planica	Planica							814
2016/17	11	10	31	9	11	1	6	3	10	–	2	8	15	5	6	7	10	19	28	8	13	15	26	3	6	12							814
2017/18	Wisła	Kuusamo	Nizhny Tagil	Nizhny Tagil	Titisee-Neustadt	Engelberg	Engelberg	Oberstdorf	Garmisch-Partenkirchen	Innsbruck	Bischofshofen	Tauplitz	Zakopane	Willingen	Willingen	Lahti	Oslo	Lillehammer	Trondheim	Vikersund	Planica	Planica											245
2017/18	30	25	19	35	–	15	27	27	20	10	11	12	19	–	–	12	3	44	19	25	–	24											245
2018/19	Wisła	Kuusamo	Kuusamo	Nizhny Tagil	Nizhny Tagil	Engelberg	Engelberg	Oberstdorf	Garmisch-Partenkirchen	Innsbruck	Bischofshofen	Val di Fiemme	Val di Fiemme	Zakopane	Sapporo	Sapporo	Oberstdorf	Oberstdorf	Oberstdorf	Lahti	Willingen	Willingen	Oslo	Lillehammer	Trondheim	Vikersund	Planica	Planica					228
2018/19	32	50	–	–	–	10	41	27	45	21	14	33	22	18	–	–	q	11	14	13	24	20	23	26	25	21	17	18					228
2019/20	Wisła	Kuusamo	Nizhny Tagil	Nizhny Tagil	Klingenthal	Engelberg	Engelberg	Oberstdorf	Garmisch-Partenkirchen	Innsbruck	Bischofshofen	Val di Fiemme	Val di Fiemme	Titisee-Neustadt	Titisee-Neustadt	Zakopane	Sapporo	Sapporo	Willingen	Tauplitz	Tauplitz	Râșnov	Râșnov	Lahti	Lahti	Oslo	Lillehammer						350
2019/20	q	36	21	13	35	18	34	14	28	23	19	16	20	29	29	18	16	8	18	11	23	30	11	9	3	29	16						350
2020/21	Wisła	Ruka	Ruka	Nizhny Tagil	Nizhny Tagil	Engelberg	Engelberg	Oberstdorf	Garmisch-Partenkirchen	Innsbruck	Bischofshofen	Titisee-Neustadt	Titisee-Neustadt	Zakopane	Lahti	Willingen	Willingen	Klingenthal	Klingenthal	Zakopane	Zakopane	Râșnov	Planica	Planica	Planica								347
2020/21	10	–	–	–	–	16	12	48	34	9	6	15	14	14	8	21	41	24	32	25	17	–	4	14	10								347
2021/22	Nizhny Tagil	Nizhny Tagil	Ruka	Ruka	Wisła	Klingenthal	Klingenthal	Engelberg	Engelberg	Oberstdorf	Garmisch-Partenkirchen	Bischofshofen	Bischofshofen	Bischofshofen	Zakopane	Titisee-Neustadt	Titisee-Neustadt	Willingen	Willingen	Lahti	Lahti	Lillehammer	Oslo	Oslo	Oberstdorf	Oberstdorf	Planica	Planica					117
2021/22	–	–	–	–	–	–	–	–	–	–	–	9	22	–	35	–	–	–	–	–	–	–	–	–	11	16	17	10					117
2022/23	Wisła	Wisła	Ruka	Ruka	Titisee-Neustadt	Titisee-Neustadt	Engelberg	Engelberg	Oberstdorf	Garmisch-Partenkirchen	Innsbruck	Bischofshofen	Zakopane	Sapporo	Sapporo	Sapporo	Bad Mitterndorf	Bad Mitterndorf	Willingen	Willingen	Lake Placid, New York	Lake Placid, New York	Râșnov	Oslo	Oslo	Lillehammer	Lillehammer	Vikersund	Vikersund	Lahti	Planica	Planica	688
2022/23	41	23	9	13	4	10	39	7	12	10	7	4	12	12	16	31	–	–	13	8	9	10	–	11	15	13	25	6	4	6	21	18	688
2023/24	Ruka	Ruka	Lillehammer	Lillehammer	Klingenthal	Klingenthal	Engelberg	Engelberg	Oberstdorf	Garmisch-Partenkirchen	Innsbruck	Bischofshofen	Wisła	Zakopane	Willingen	Willingen	Lake Placid, New York	Lake Placid, New York	Sapporo	Sapporo	Oberstdorf	Oberstdorf	Lahti	Lahti	Oslo	Oslo	Trondheim	Trondheim	Vikersund	Vikersund	Planica	Planica	882
2023/24	9	10	13	9	8	21	10	17	10	8	3	11	7	4	4	15	4	11	–	–	4	8	16	10	4	12	14	6	17	8	18	15	882
2024–25	Lillehammer	Lillehammer	Ruka	Ruka	Wisła	Wisła	Titisee-Neustadt	Titisee-Neustadt	Engelberg	Engelberg	Oberstdorf	Garmisch-Partenkirchen	Innsbruck	Bischofshofen	Zakopane	Oberstdorf	Oberstdorf	Willingen	Willingen	Lake Placid	Lake Placid	Sapporo	Sapporo	Oslo	Vikersund	Vikersund	Lahti	Planica	Planica				587
2024–25	15	22	12	49	12	16	12	2	12	15	8	3	12	7	6	7	3	32	18	17	23	–	–	24	25	22	24	18	–				587
