= FIS Ski Flying World Championships 2024 =

2024 edition of the FIS Ski Flying World Championships

- Host city: Bad Mitterndorf
- Nations: Austria
- Sport: Ski flying
- Events: 2
- Opening: 25 January
- Closing: 28 January
- Main venue: Kulm HS235

The FIS Ski Flying World Championships 2024 was the 28th Ski Flying World Championships, which took place from 25 to 28 January 2024 in Bad Mitterndorf, Austria. It was the sixth competition of its rank, held at this location (previously in 1975, 1986, 1996, 2006 and 2016).

The decision to choose Bad Mitterndorf as the host of the Championships was announced on 1 April 2021. Originally, the event was to be held in Harrachov, but was moved due to technical and financial problems related to the Čerťák facility.

The defending champion was Marius Lindvik from Norway and the Slovenian national team. Lindvik finished 13th, while Slovenia successfully defended the title.

== Schedule ==
Date	Competition	Longest jump of the day	Distance
24 January 2024	Hill test	cancelled due to strong wind	
25 January 2024	Official training 1	cancelled due to strong wind	
25 January 2024	Official training 2	cancelled due to strong wind	
25 January 2024	Qualification	cancelled due to strong wind – all 47 jumpers will compete in 1st round	
26 January 2024	Official training 1	(Austria) Michael Hayböck	224.5 metres (737 ft)
26 January 2024	Official training 2	(Slovenia) Timi Zajc	238 metres (781 ft)
26 January 2024	1st round Individual	(Finland) Niko Kytösaho	232.5 metres (763 ft)
26 January 2024	2nd round Individual	(Slovenia) Timi Zajc	227 metres (745 ft)
27 January 2024	3rd round Individual	(Switzerland) Gregor Deschwanden	235.5 metres (773 ft)
27 January 2024	4th round Individual	cancelled due to delays before the competition due to wind	
28 January 2024	1st round Team event	(Japan) Ryōyū Kobayashi	233.5 metres (766 ft)
28 January 2024	2nd round Team event	(Germany) Andreas Wellinger	229.5 metres (753 ft)

== Medal summary ==
=== Medal table ===
* Host nation (Austria)

Rank	Nation	Gold	Silver	Bronze	Total
1	Austria*	1	1	0	2
2	Slovenia	1	0	1	2
3	Germany	0	1	1	2
Totals (3 entries)		2	2	2	6

=== Medalists ===
Event	Gold		Silver		Bronze	
Individual	Stefan Kraft; Austria	647.4	Andreas Wellinger; Germany	645.2	Timi Zajc; Slovenia	642.7
Team	Slovenia; Lovro Kos; Domen Prevc; Peter Prevc; Timi Zajc	1,615.4	Austria; Michael Hayböck; Manuel Fettner; Jan Hörl; Stefan Kraft	1,588.9	Germany; Pius Paschke; Karl Geiger; Stephan Leyhe; Andreas Wellinger	1,549.9
