= Michael Glasder =

American ski jumper

Personal information
- Full name: Michael J. Glasder
- Nationality: United States
- Born: March 27, 1989 (age 37) Lake Forest, Illinois, U.S.
- Height: 6 ft 0 in (183 cm)

Sport
- Sport: Skiing
- Club: Norge Ski Club

World Cup career
- Seasons: 2009–2010; 2014–present
- Indiv. starts: 25
- Team starts: 11

Achievements and titles
- Personal bests: 209 m (686 ft); Oberstdorf, February 3, 2017
- Updated on March 25, 2018

Michael Glasder (born March 27, 1989) is an American ski jumper.

He competed for the United States at the 2018 Winter Olympics.

== World Cup ==
=== Standings ===
Season	Overall	4H	SF	RA	W5	P7	NT
2008/09	—	—	—	N/A	—	N/A	N/A
2009/10	—	—	—	N/A	N/A	N/A	N/A
2013/14	—	—	—	N/A	N/A	N/A	N/A
2014/15	—	—	—	N/A	N/A	N/A	N/A
2015/16	—	67	—	N/A	N/A	N/A	N/A
2016/17	67	55	45	48	N/A	N/A	N/A
2017/18	—	—	—	63	42	55	N/A

=== Individual starts (25) ===
Season	1	2	3	4	5	6	7	8	9	10	11	12	13	14	15	16	17	18	19	20	21	22	23	24	25	26	27	28	29	30	31	Points
2008/09	Kuusamo	Trondheim	Trondheim	Pragelato	Pragelato	Engelberg	Engelberg	Oberstdorf	Garmisch-Partenkirchen	Innsbruck	Bischofshofen	Tauplitz	Tauplitz	Zakopane	Zakopane	Whistler	Whistler	Sapporo	Willingen	Klingenthal	Oberstdorf	Lahti	Kuopio	Lillehammer	Vikersund	Planica	Planica					0
2008/09	–	–	–	–	–	–	–	–	–	–	–	–	–	–	–	–	–	–	–	–	q	–	–	–	–	q	–					0
2009/10	Kuusamo	Lillehammer	Lillehammer	Engelberg	Engelberg	Engelberg	Oberstdorf	Garmisch-Partenkirchen	Innsbruck	Bischofshofen	Bad Mitterndorf	Bad Mitterndorf	Sapporo	Sapporo	Zakopane	Zakopane	Oberstdorf	Klingenthal	Willingen	Lahti	Kuopio	Lillehammer	Oslo									0
2009/10	q	–	–	–	–	–	–	–	–	–	–	–	48	q	–	–	q	q	–	–	–	q	–									0
2013/14	Klingenthal	Kuusamo	Lillehammer	Lillehammer	Titisee-Neustadt	Titisee-Neustadt	Engelberg	Engelberg	Oberstdorf	Garmisch-Partenkirchen	Innsbruck	Bischofshofen	Tauplitz	Tauplitz	Wisła	Zakopane	Sapporo	Sapporo	Willingen	Willingen	Falun	Lahti	Lahti	Kuopio	Trondheim	Oslo	Planica	Planica				0
2013/14	–	–	–	–	–	–	–	–	–	–	–	–	–	–	–	–	q	62	–	–	–	–	–	–	–	–	–	q				0
2014/15	Klingenthal	Kuusamo	Kuusamo	Lillehammer	Lillehammer	Nizhny Tagil	Nizhny Tagil	Engelberg	Engelberg	Oberstdorf	Garmisch-Partenkirchen	Innsbruck	Bischofshofen	Tauplitz	Wisła	Zakopane	Sapporo	Sapporo	Willingen	Willingen	Titisee-Neustadt	Titisee-Neustadt	Vikersund	Vikersund	Lahti	Kuopio	Trondheim	Oslo	Oslo	Planica	Planica	0
2014/15	–	–	–	–	–	–	–	–	–	–	–	–	–	–	q	q	–	–	q	q	q	q	q	q	q	52	q	q	q	q	–	0
2015/16	Klingenthal	Lillehammer	Lillehammer	Nizhny Tagil	Nizhny Tagil	Engelberg	Engelberg	Oberstdorf	Garmisch-Partenkirchen	Innsbruck	Bischofshofen	Willingen	Zakopane	Sapporo	Sapporo	Trondheim	Vikersund	Vikersund	Vikersund	Lahti	Lahti	Kuopio	Almaty	Almaty	Wisła	Titisee-Neustadt	Planica	Planica	Planica			0
2015/16	q	43	q	–	–	48	49	q	q	48	q	43	–	–	–	–	–	–	–	–	–	–	q	48	–	35	51	q	–			0
2016/17	Kuusamo	Kuusamo	Klingenthal	Lillehammer	Lillehammer	Engelberg	Engelberg	Oberstdorf	Garmisch-Partenkirchen	Innsbruck	Bischofshofen	Wisła	Wisła	Zakopane	Willingen	Oberstdorf	Oberstdorf	Sapporo	Sapporo	Pyeongchang	Pyeongchang	Oslo	Trondheim	Vikersund	Planica	Planica						3
2016/17	q	40	50	q	49	39	q	q	q	q	35	q	q	q	–	30	36	32	29	q	q	q	q	33	q	–						3
2017/18	Wisła	Kuusamo	Nizhny Tagil	Nizhny Tagil	Titisee-Neustadt	Engelberg	Engelberg	Oberstdorf	Garmisch-Partenkirchen	Innsbruck	Bischofshofen	Tauplitz	Zakopane	Willingen	Willingen	Lahti	Oslo	Lillehammer	Trondheim	Vikersund	Planica	Planica										0
2017/18	–	DQ	q	q	q	q	47	–	–	–	q	–	–	47	35	q	q	q	q	q	q	–										0
