= Kento Sakuyama =

Japanese ski jumper

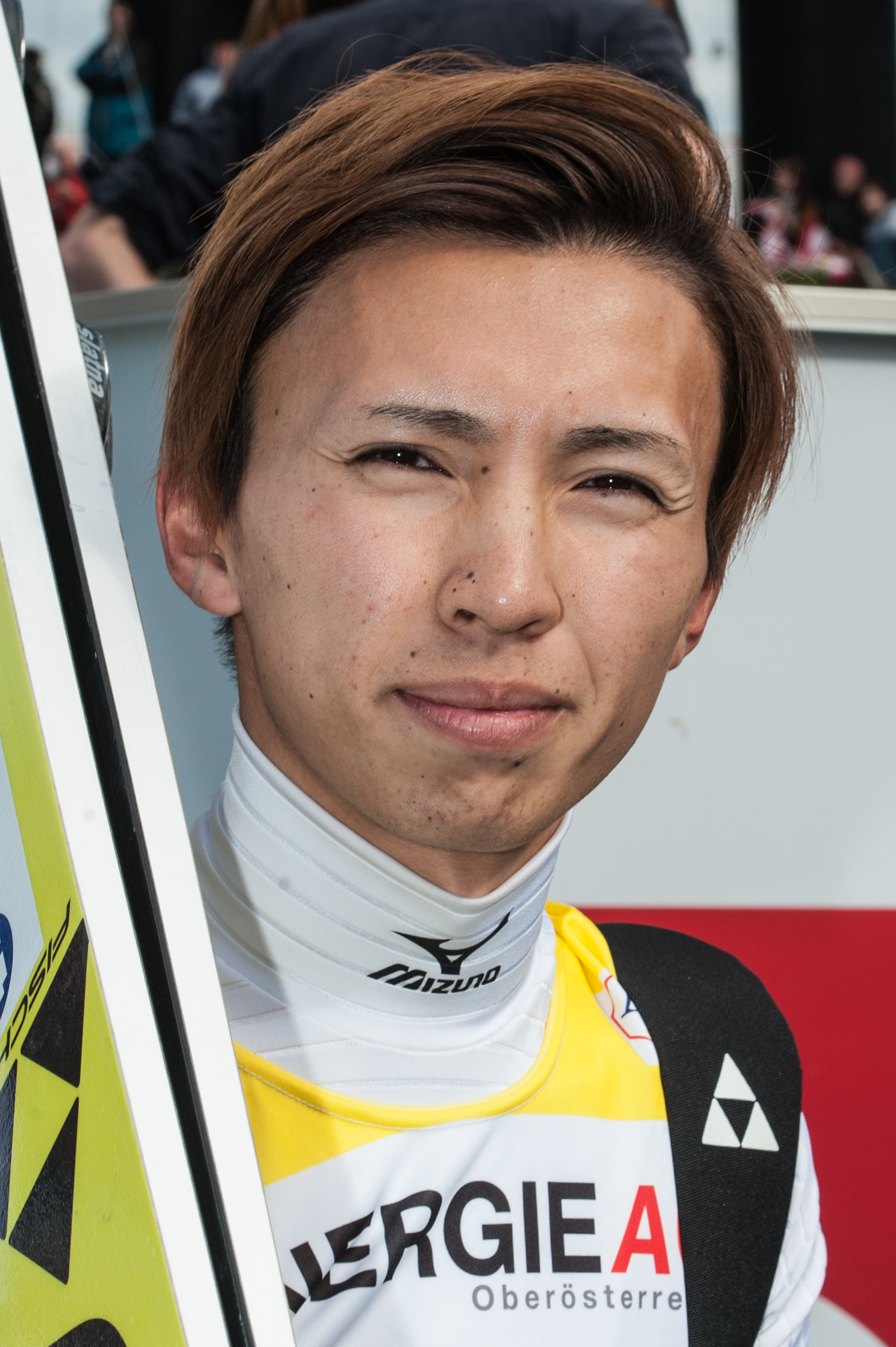

Kento Sakuyama (Japanese: 作山憲斗, romanized: Sakuyama Kento; born 3 July 1990) is a Japanese ski jumper.

At the 2008 Junior World Ski Championships he finished fifth in the team competition, and at the 2009 Junior World Ski Championships he finished sixth in the team competition. He made his Continental Cup debut in December 2007, his best result being a tenth place from Zakopane in February 2009. He made his World Cup debut in January 2010 in Sapporo, collecting his first World Cup points with a 21st place.
