= Manuel Fettner =

Austrian ski jumper (born 1985)

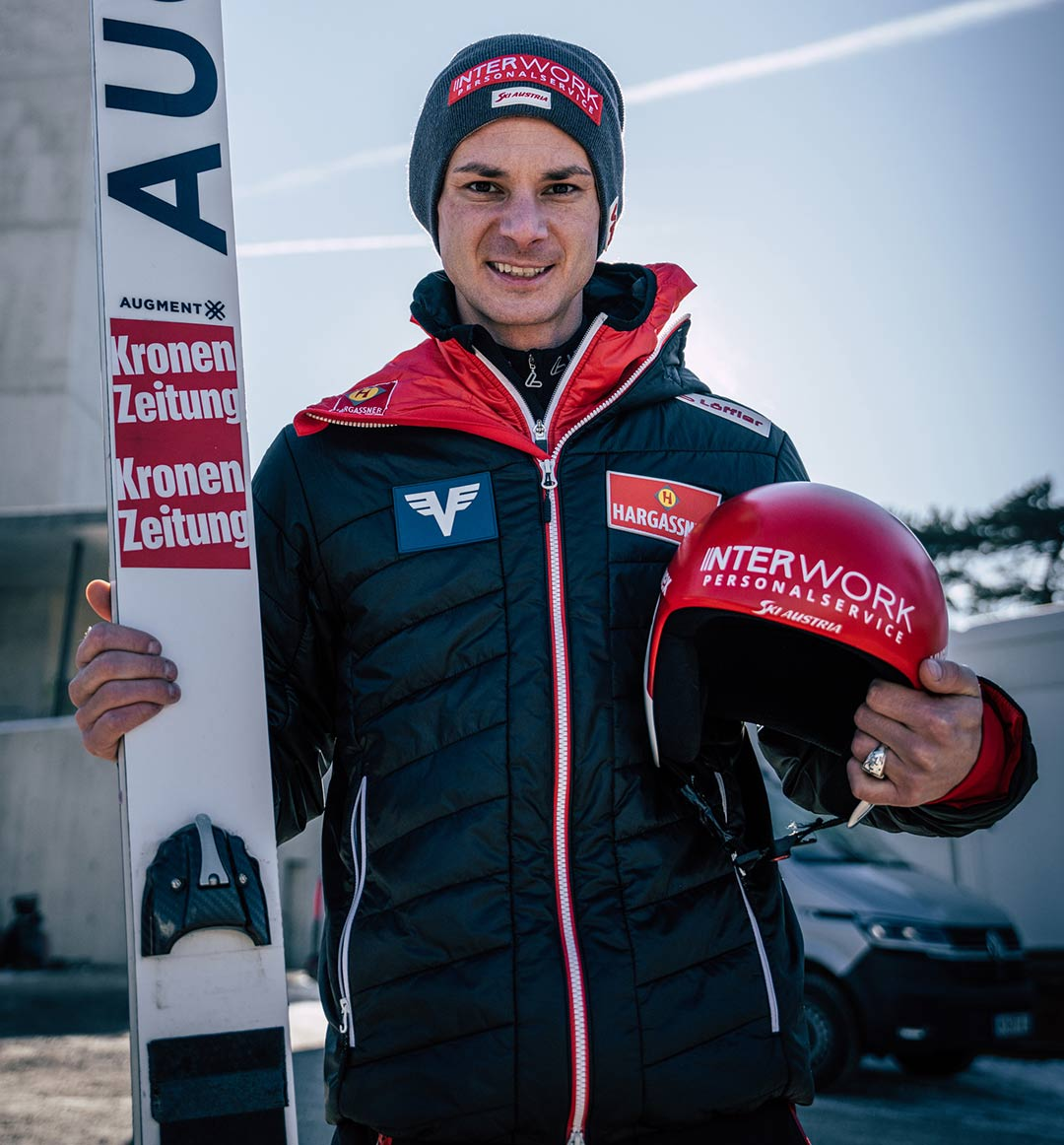
- Fettner in 2022

Personal information
- Nationality: Austrian
- Born: 17 June 1985 (age 41) Vienna, Austria
- Height: 1.79 m (5 ft 10 in)

Sport
- Sport: Skiing
- Club: SV Innsbruck Bergisel

World Cup career
- Seasons: 2001–2026
- Indiv. starts: 392
- Indiv. podiums: 5
- Team podiums: 13
- Team wins: 3

Achievements and titles
- Personal bests: 235,5 m Vikersund, 2017
Medal record
Representing Austria
Men's ski jumping
Olympic Games
Gold medal – first place	2022 Beijing	Team LH
Silver medal – second place	2022 Beijing	Individual NH
World Championships
Gold medal – first place	2013 Val di Fiemme	Team LH
Bronze medal – third place	2017 Lahti	Team LH
Men's ski flying
World Championships
Silver medal – second place	2024 Bad Mitterndorf	Team
Silver medal – second place	2026 Oberstdorf	Team
Bronze medal – third place	2016 Bad Mitterndorf	Team
- Updated on 29 March 2026

Manuel Fettner (born 17 June 1985) is an Austrian former ski jumper. He won a silver medal on the normal hill at the 2022 Winter Olympics and a gold medal with the Team at the 2013 World Ski Championships.

== Personal life ==
Fettner is married to ski jumper Lisa Eder.
