= FIS Nordic World Ski Championships 2017 =

FIS Nordic World Ski Championships

- Official logo for the FIS Nordic World Ski Championships 2017.
- Host city: Lahti
- Country: Finland
- Events: 21
- Opening: 22 February 2017
- Closing: 5 March 2017
- Main venue: Salpausselkä
- Website: Lahti2017.fi

The FIS Nordic World Ski Championships 2017 was the 40th World Championships in Nordic skiing and took place in Lahti, Finland from 22 February to 5 March 2017. This was the seventh time the event has been held there, having previously been held in 1926, 1938, 1958, 1978, 1989 and 2001.

== Host selection ==
Of the four candidate cities three had already submitted unsuccessful bids for the previous championships in 2015.

City	Country	Previous championships hosted
Lahti	Finland	1926, 1938, 1958, 1978, 1989, 2001
Oberstdorf	Germany	1987, 2005
Planica	Slovenia	
Zakopane	Poland	1929, 1939, 1962

The winner was selected at the FIS Congress in South Korea on 31 May 2012. The Voting results were as following:

City	First vote	Second vote	Third vote
Lahti	7	7	12
Planica	5	5	3
Oberstdorf	3	3	Out
Zakopane	0	Out	Out

== Schedule ==
All times are local (UTC+2).

Cross-country

Date	Time	Event
22 February	14:00	Women's 5 km classical qualification
22 February	15:30	Men's 10 km classical qualification
23 February	15:00	Men's & women's sprint
25 February	12:00	Women's 2x7.5 km skiathlon
25 February	14:30	Men's 2x15 km skiathlon
26 February	11:30	Men's & women's team sprint
28 February	13:45	Women's 10 km classical
1 March	13:45	Men's 15 km classical
2 March	15:00	Women's 4 x 5 km relay
3 March	13:30	Men's 4 x 10 km relay
4 March	14:30	Women's 30 km freestyle
5 March	14:30	Men's 50 km freestyle

Nordic combined

Date	Time	Event
24 February	10:30; 13:30	HS100 / 10 km
26 February	12:00; 15:30	Team HS100 / 4x5 km
1 March	12:00; 16:15	HS130 / 10 km
3 March	16:00; 18:15	Team sprint HS130 / 2x7.5 km

Ski jumping

Date	Time	Event
23 February	14:00	Women's HS100 qualification
24 February	14:30	Men's HS100 qualification
24 February	17:30	Women's HS100
25 February	17:30	Men's HS100
26 February	17:30	Team mixed HS100
1 March	18:00	Men's HS130 qualification
2 March	18:30	Men's HS130
4 March	17:15	Men's team HS130

== Medal summary ==
=== Medal table ===
The host country is highlighted in blue

Rank	Nation	Gold	Silver	Bronze	Total
1	Norway (NOR)	7	6	5	18
2	Germany (GER)	6	3	2	11
3	Russia (RUS)	2	4	0	6
4	Austria (AUT)	2	1	2	5
5	Finland (FIN)*	1	1	3	5
6	Italy (ITA)	1	1	0	2
7	Poland (POL)	1	0	1	2
8	Canada (CAN)	1	0	0	1
9	Japan (JPN)	0	2	3	5
10	Sweden (SWE)	0	2	2	4
11	United States (USA)	0	1	2	3
12	France (FRA)	0	0	1	1
Totals (12 entries)		21	21	21	63

=== Top athletes ===
All athletes with three or more medals or at least two gold medals.

Rank	Athlete	Gold	Silver	Bronze	Total
1	Johannes Rydzek (GER)	4	0	0	4
1	Marit Bjørgen (NOR)	4	0	0	4
3	Maiken Caspersen Falla (NOR)	3	0	0	3
4	Sergey Ustiugov (RUS)	2	3	0	5
5	Stefan Kraft (AUT)	2	1	1	4
6	Eric Frenzel (GER)	2	1	0	3
6	Heidi Weng (NOR)	2	1	0	3
8	Carina Vogt (GER)	2	0	0	2
9	Andreas Wellinger (GER)	1	2	0	3
9	Martin Johnsrud Sundby (NOR)	1	2	0	3
11	Astrid Uhrenholdt Jacobsen (NOR)	1	0	2	3
12	Charlotte Kalla (SWE)	0	2	1	3
Totals (12 entries)		24	12	4	40

Fifteen other athletes earned 2 medals.

=== Cross-country skiing ===
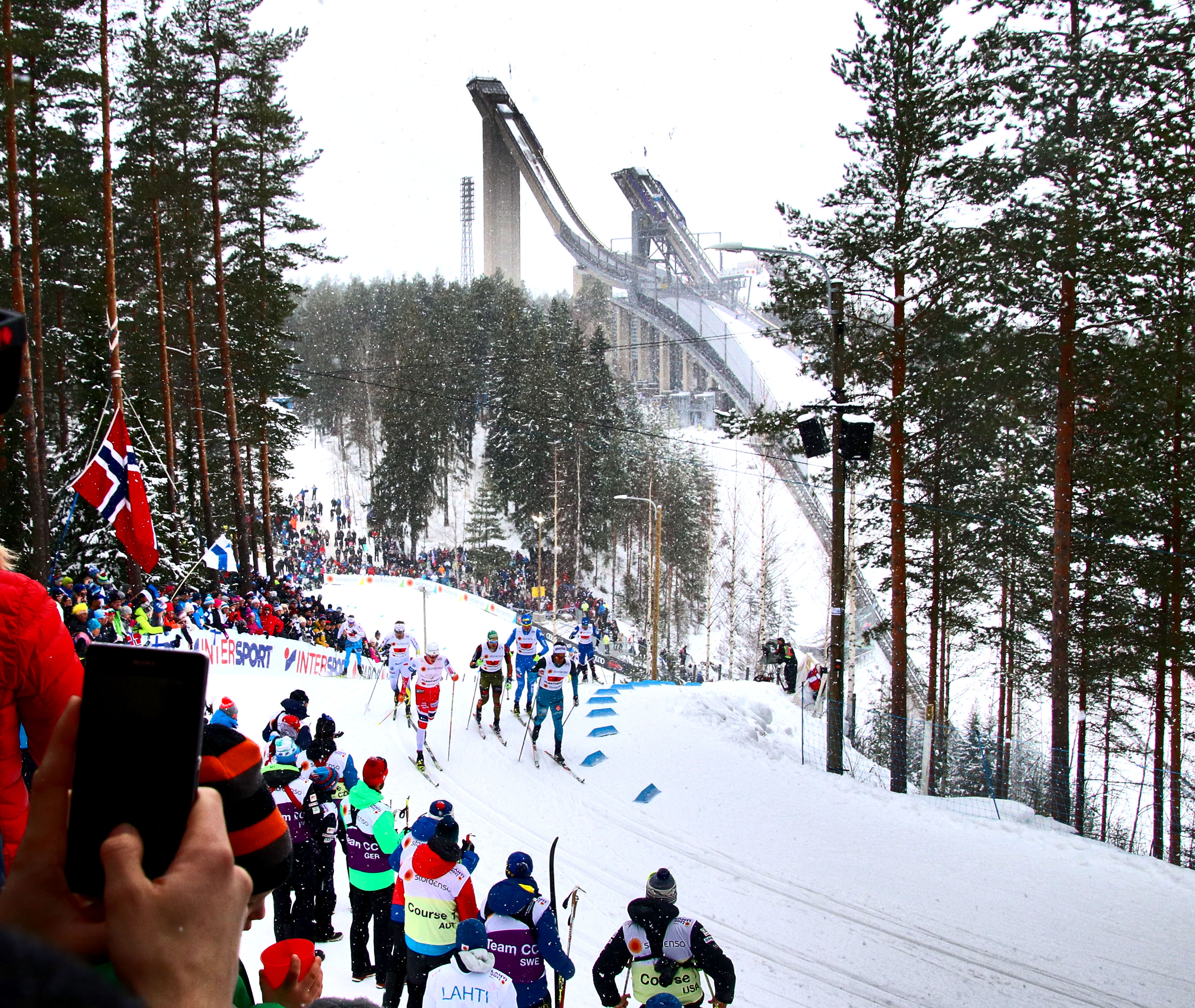
Cross-country skiing in Lahti

==== Men ====
Event	Gold		Silver		Bronze	
15 kilometre classical	Iivo Niskanen; Finland	36:44.0	Martin Johnsrud Sundby; Norway	37:01.9	Niklas Dyrhaug; Norway	37:15.3
30 kilometre skiathlon	Sergey Ustiugov; Russia	1:09:16.7	Martin Johnsrud Sundby; Norway	1:09:23.4	Finn Hågen Krogh; Norway	1:09:48.5
50 kilometre freestyle mass start	Alex Harvey; Canada	1:46:28.9	Sergey Ustiugov; Russia	1:46:29.5	Matti Heikkinen; Finland	1:46:30.3
4 × 10 kilometre relay	Norway; Didrik Tønseth; Niklas Dyrhaug; Martin Johnsrud Sundby; Finn Hågen Krogh	1:37:20.1	Russia; Andrey Larkov; Alexander Bessmertnykh; Aleksey Chervotkin; Sergey Ustiugov	1:37:24.7	Sweden; Daniel Rickardsson; Johan Olsson; Marcus Hellner; Calle Halfvarsson	1:39:51.9
Sprint	Federico Pellegrino; Italy	3:13.76	Sergey Ustiugov; Russia	3:13.91	Johannes Høsflot Klæbo; Norway	3:14.20
Team sprint	Russia; Nikita Kriukov; Sergey Ustiugov	17:40.69	Italy; Dietmar Nöckler; Federico Pellegrino	17:42.83	Finland; Sami Jauhojärvi; Iivo Niskanen	17:49.33

==== Women ====
Event	Gold		Silver		Bronze	
10 kilometre classical	Marit Bjørgen; Norway	25:24.9	Charlotte Kalla; Sweden	26:05.9	Astrid Uhrenholdt Jacobsen; Norway	26:20.4
15 kilometre skiathlon	Marit Bjørgen; Norway	37:57.5	Krista Pärmäkoski; Finland	38:02.3	Charlotte Kalla; Sweden	38:29.5
30 kilometre freestyle mass start	Marit Bjørgen; Norway	1:08:36.8	Heidi Weng; Norway	1:08:38.7	Astrid Uhrenholdt Jacobsen; Norway	1:08:38.7
4 × 5 kilometre relay	Norway; Maiken Caspersen Falla; Heidi Weng; Astrid Uhrenholdt Jacobsen; Marit Bjørgen	52:21.5	Sweden; Anna Haag; Charlotte Kalla; Ebba Andersson; Stina Nilsson	53:23.1	Finland; Aino-Kaisa Saarinen; Kerttu Niskanen; Laura Mononen; Krista Pärmäkoski	53:23.6
Sprint	Maiken Caspersen Falla; Norway	3:02.34	Jessie Diggins; United States	3:04.00	Kikkan Randall; United States	3:06.10
Team sprint	Norway; Heidi Weng; Maiken Caspersen Falla	20:20.56	Russia; Yulia Belorukova; Natalya Matveyeva	20:26.12	United States; Sadie Bjornsen; Jessie Diggins	20:38.94

=== Nordic combined ===
Event	Gold		Silver		Bronze	
Individual large hill/10 km	Johannes Rydzek; Germany	26:41.6	Akito Watabe; Japan	26:46.4	François Braud; France	26:54.6
Individual normal hill/10 km	Johannes Rydzek; Germany	26:19.6	Eric Frenzel; Germany	26:34.5	Björn Kircheisen; Germany	26:49.6
Team normal hill/4 × 5 km	Germany; Björn Kircheisen; Eric Frenzel; Fabian Rießle; Johannes Rydzek	47:57.3	Norway; Magnus Moan; Mikko Kokslien; Magnus Krog; Jørgen Graabak	48:39.0	Austria; Bernhard Gruber; Mario Seidl; Philipp Orter; Paul Gerstgraser	49:01.0
Team sprint large hill/2 × 7,5 km	Germany; Eric Frenzel; Johannes Rydzek	29:01.8	Norway; Magnus Moan; Magnus Krog	29:02.8	Japan; Yoshito Watabe; Akito Watabe	29:12.0

=== Ski jumping ===
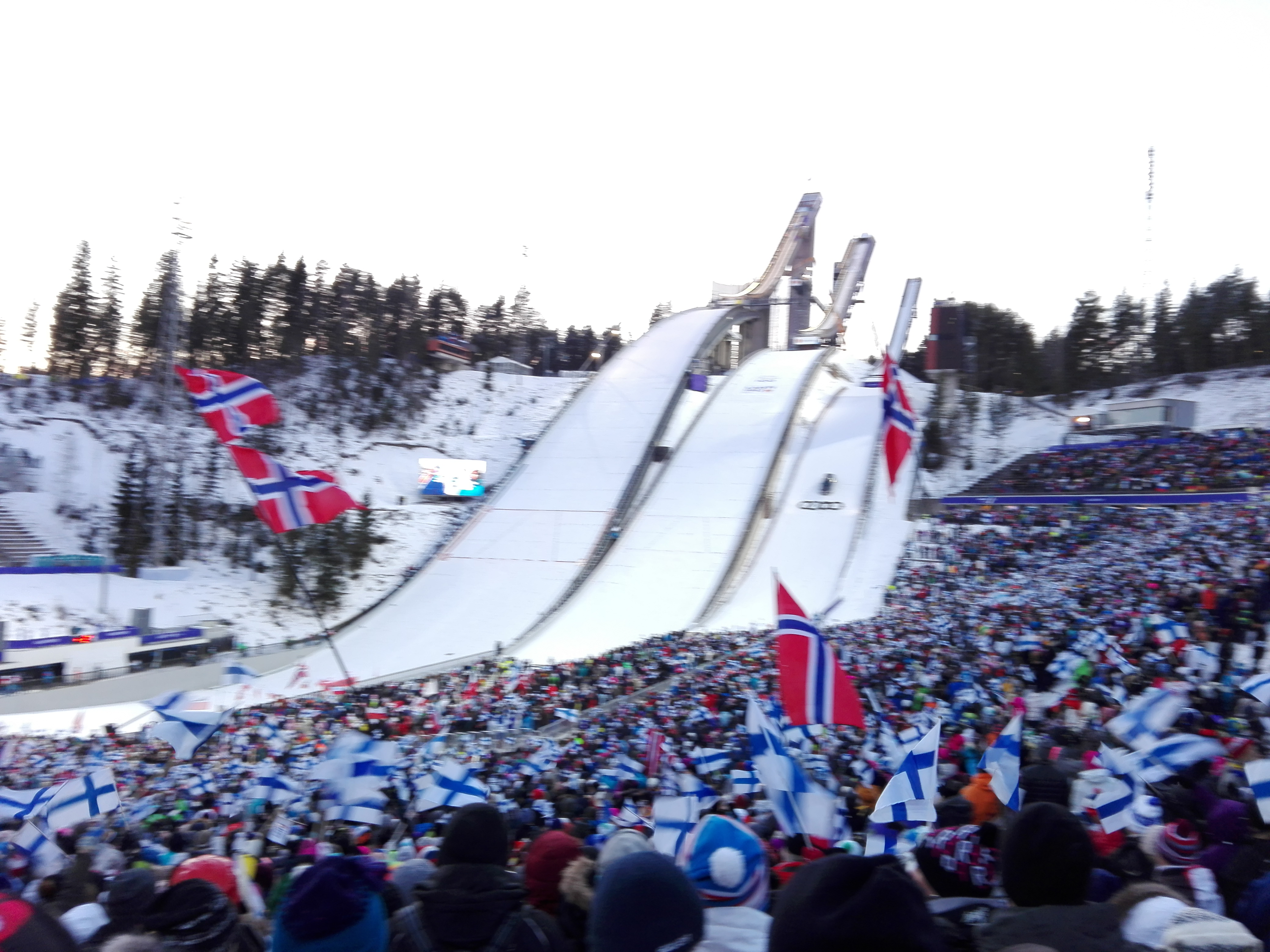

==== Men ====
Event	Gold		Silver		Bronze	
Men's individual normal hill	Stefan Kraft; Austria	270.8	Andreas Wellinger; Germany	268.7	Markus Eisenbichler; Germany	263.6
Men's individual large hill	Stefan Kraft; Austria	279.3	Andreas Wellinger; Germany	278.0	Piotr Żyła; Poland	276.7
Men's team large hill	Poland; Piotr Żyła; Dawid Kubacki; Maciej Kot; Kamil Stoch	1104.2	Norway; Anders Fannemel; Johann Andre Forfang; Daniel-André Tande; Andreas Stjernen	1078.5	Austria; Michael Hayböck; Manuel Fettner; Gregor Schlierenzauer; Stefan Kraft	1068.9

==== Women ====
Event	Gold		Silver		Bronze	
Women's individual normal hill	Carina Vogt; Germany	254.6	Yuki Ito; Japan	252.6	Sara Takanashi; Japan	251.1

==== Mixed ====
Event	Gold		Silver		Bronze	
Mixed team normal hill	Germany; Carina Vogt; Markus Eisenbichler; Svenja Würth; Andreas Wellinger	1035.5	Austria; Daniela Iraschko-Stolz; Michael Hayböck; Jacqueline Seifriedsberger; Stefan Kraft	999.3	Japan; Sara Takanashi; Taku Takeuchi; Yuki Ito; Daiki Ito	979.7
