= 2009–10 FIS Ski Flying World Cup =

FIS Ski Flying World Cup 2009/10
Winners
- Overall: (Slovenia) Robert Kranjec
- Nations Cup (unofficial): Austria

Competitions
- Venues: 2
- Individual: 3
- Team: 1

The 2009/10 FIS Ski Flying World Cup was the 13th official World Cup season in ski flying awarded with small crystal globe as the subdiscipline of FIS Ski Jumping World Cup.

== Map of World Cup hosts ==
(Austria) Bad Mitterndorf	(Germany) Oberstdorf
Kulm	Heini-Klopfer
Europe

== Calendar ==
=== Men's Individual ===
All	No.	Date	Place (Hill)	Size	Winner	Second	Third	Ski flying leader	R.
720	1	9 January 2010	(Austria) Bad Mitterndorf (Kulm HS200)	F _{076}	(Slovenia) Robert Kranjec	(Switzerland) Simon Ammann	(Austria) Martin Koch	(Slovenia) Robert Kranjec	
721	2	10 January 2010	(Austria) Bad Mitterndorf (Kulm HS200)	F _{077}	(Austria) Gregor Schlierenzauer	(Slovenia) Robert Kranjec	(Finland) Harri Olli	(Slovenia) Robert Kranjec	
726	3	31 January 2010	(Germany) Oberstdorf (Heini-Klopfer HS213)	F _{078}	(Norway) Anders Jacobsen	(Slovenia) Robert Kranjec	(Norway) Johan Remen Evensen	(Slovenia) Robert Kranjec	
13th FIS Ski Flying Men's Overall (9 – 31 January 2010)					(Slovenia) Robert Kranjec	(Austria) Gregor Schlierenzauer	(Switzerland) Simon Ammann	Ski Flying Overall	
FIS Ski Flying World Championships 2010 (19 – 20 March • (Slovenia) Planica)

=== Men's team ===
All	No.	Date	Place (Hill)	Size	Winner	Second	Third	R.
47	1	30 January 2010	(Germany) Oberstdorf (Heini-Klopfer-Skiflugschanze HS213)	F _{009}	Austria Martin Koch; Andreas Kofler; Wolfgang Loitzl; Gregor Schlierenzauer	Norway Johan Remen Evensen; Tom Hilde; Anders Jacobsen; Bjørn Einar Romøren	Finland Matti Hautamäki; Kalle Keituri; Janne Ahonen; Harri Olli	

FIS Team Tour 2010 (part of)

== Standings ==
=== Ski Flying ===
Rank	after 3 events	09/01/2010 Kulm	10/01/2010 Kulm	31/01/2010 Oberstdorf	Total
	(Slovenia) Robert Kranjec	100	80	80	260
2	(Austria) Gregor Schlierenzauer	45	100	36	181
3	(Switzerland) Simon Ammann	80	45	50	175
4	(Austria) Martin Koch	60	50	45	155
5	(Norway) Anders Jacobsen	—	20	100	120
6	(Czech Republic) Antonín Hájek	50	36	32	118
7	(Norway) Johan Remen Evensen	26	29	60	115
8	(Poland) Adam Małysz	36	32	40	108
9	(Austria) Wolfgang Loitzl	32	40	26	98
10	(Finland) Janne Ahonen	29	22	24	75
11	(Germany) Michael Uhrmann	18	24	29	71
12	(Austria) Andreas Kofler	40	26	—	66
13	(Finland) Harri Olli	—	60	—	60
14	(Germany) Michael Neumayer	13	10	20	43
	(Austria) Stefan Thurnbichler	16	14	12	42
16	(Finland) Matti Hautamäki	14	12	16	42
17	(France) Emmanuel Chedal	15	9	15	39
18	(Austria) Thomas Morgenstern	22	16	—	38
19	(Czech Republic) Borek Sedlák	2	15	18	35
20	(Norway) Bjørn Einar Romøren	24	8	—	32
	(Norway) Tom Hilde	11	7	14	32
22	(Italy) Andrea Morassi	9	18	—	27
23	(Poland) Łukasz Rutkowski	20	6	—	26
24	(Austria) David Zauner	—	—	22	22
25	(Finland) Kalle Keituri	12	—	9	21
	(Germany) Pascal Bodmer	10	11	—	21
27	(Russia) Denis Kornilov	7	—	13	20
28	(Austria) Lukas Müller	6	13	—	19
29	(Norway) Vegard Haukø Sklett	—	—	11	11
30	(Slovenia) Jurij Tepeš	—	—	10	10
31	(Germany) Severin Freund	—	—	8	8
	(Slovenia) Mitja Mežnar	8	—	—	8
	(Norway) Anders Bardal	—	—	8	8
34	(Slovenia) Jernej Damjan	4	—	3	7
	(Poland) Krzysztof Miętus	3	4	—	7
36	(Switzerland) Andreas Küttel	—	—	6	6
37	(Italy) Sebastian Colloredo	5	—	—	5
	(Germany) Maximilian Mechler	—	—	5	5
	(Finland) Janne Happonen	—	5	—	5
40	(Czech Republic) Jan Matura	—	—	5	4
	(Germany) Andreas Wank	1	3	—	4
42	(Poland) Stefan Hula	—	2	—	2
	(France) Vincent Descombes Sevoie	—	—	2	2
44	(Poland) Marcin Bachleda	—	1	—	1
	(Japan) Kazuya Yoshioka	—	—	1	1

=== Nations Cup (unofficial) ===
Rank	after 4 events	Points
1	Austria	1021
2	Norway	668
3	Finland	503
4	Slovenia	485
5	Germany	402
6	Czech Republic	307
7	Poland	244
8	Switzerland	181
9	Japan	51
10	France	41
11	Italy	32
12	Russia	20
