= FIS Nordic World Ski Championships 2011 – Men's individual normal hill =

Men's individual normal hill at the FIS Nordic World Ski Championships 2011
- Venue: Midtstubakken
- Date: 26 February 2011
- Competitors: 66 from 22 nations
- Winning score: 269.2

Medalists
gold medal	Thomas Morgenstern	Austria
silver medal	Andreas Kofler	Austria
bronze medal	Adam Małysz	Poland

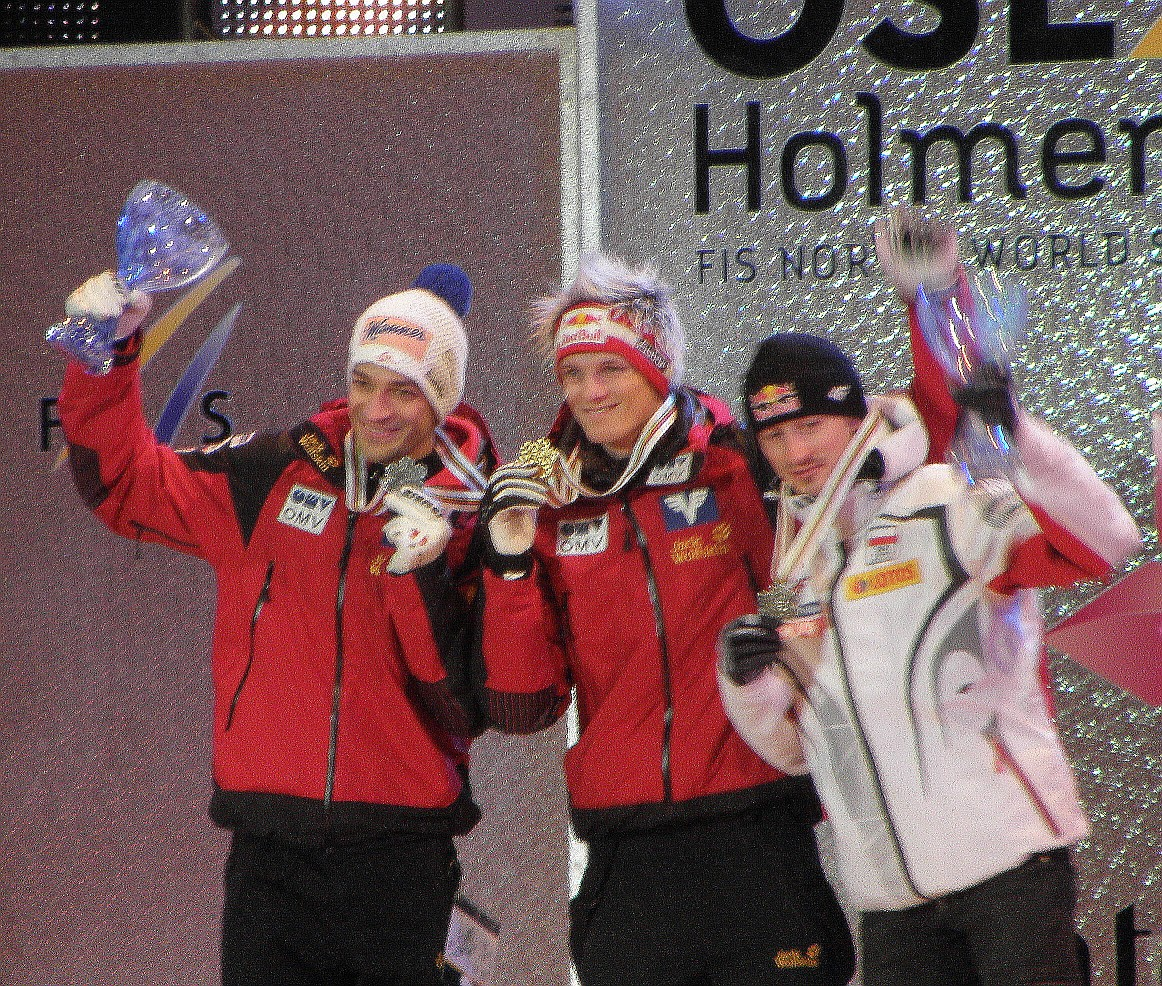
The podium

The Men's Individual normal hill ski jumping event at the FIS Nordic World Ski Championships 2011 was held on 26 February 2011 at 15:00 CET with the qualification being held on 25 February 2011 at 12:30 CET. Wolfgang Loitzl of Austria was the defending world champion while Switzerland's Simon Ammann was the defending Olympic champion.

== Results ==
=== Qualifying ===
Rank	Bib	Name	Country	Distance (m)	Distance Points	Judges Points	Total	Notes
1	54	Daiki Ito	Japan	102.0	74.0	57.0	123.4	Q
2	48	Robert Kranjec	Slovenia	102.0	74.0	55.5	122.2	Q
3	51	Michael Uhrmann	Germany	102.5	75.0	55.0	121.0	Q
4	29	Piotr Żyła	Poland	101.0	72.0	55.0	119.9	Q
5	52	Anders Jacobsen	Norway	100.0	70.0	55.5	119.0	Q
6	55	Wolfgang Loitzl	Austria	99.5	69.0	54.5	117.7	Q
7	31	Lukáš Hlava	Czech Republic	100.0	70.0	54.0	116.8	Q
8	34	Sebastian Colloredo	Italy	96.0	62.0	53.5	112.6	Q
9	43	Martin Schmitt	Germany	98.0	66.0	53.0	112.5	Q
10	50	Anders Bardal	Norway	96.5	63.0	53.5	112.2	Q
10	39	Anssi Koivuranta	Finland	97.0	64.0	54.0	112.2	Q
12	42	Pascal Bodmer	Germany	98.5	67.0	52.0	111.7	Q
13	56	Johan Remen Evensen	Norway	97.0	64.0	54.0	111.3	Q
14	30	Vladimir Zografski	Bulgaria	97.0	64.0	54.0	109.6	Q
15	37	Olli Muotka	Finland	96.5	63.0	52.5	108.6	Q
16	23	Dimitry Vassiliev	Russia	96.5	63.0	52.5	108.2	Q
17	46	Peter Prevc	Slovenia	95.0	60.0	53.0	108.1	Q
18	40	Denis Kornilov	Russia	98.0	66.0	52.5	107.9	Q
19	44	Emmanuel Chedal	France	95.0	60.0	52.0	105.3	Q
19	41	Jakub Janda	Czech Republic	94.5	59.0	52.5	105.3	Q
21	38	Janne Ahonen	Finland	95.5	61.0	53.0	105.2	Q
22	32	Andrea Morassi	Italy	94.5	59.0	53.5	104.0	Q
23	33	Borek Sedlák	Czech Republic	92.0	54.0	53.0	103.7	Q
24	22	Tomasz Byrt	Poland	94.0	58.0	52.0	102.9	Q
25	28	Mitja Mežnar	Slovenia	92.5	55.0	52.5	102.3	Q
26	36	Taku Takeuchi	Japan	91.5	53.0	52.5	102.0	Q
27	49	Pavel Karelin	Russia	92.0	54.0	52.0	100.3	Q
28	19	Andreas Küttel	Switzerland	92.0	54.0	53.5	100.0	Q
29	47	Noriaki Kasai	Japan	92.0	54.0	51.5	99.6	Q
30	10	Pascal Egloff	Switzerland	91.0	52.0	51.0	96.8	Q
31	12	Radik Zhaparov	Kazakhstan	90.0	50.0	50.0	94.3	Q
32	11	Nicolas Mayer	France	88.5	47.0	50.5	93.5	Q
33	7	Nikolay Karpenko	Kazakhstan	91.5	53.0	50.0	89.9	Q
34	14	Marco Grigoli	Switzerland	88.5	47.0	50.0	88.5	Q
34	5	Vincent Descombes Sevoie	France	89.0	48.0	49.5	88.5	Q
36	53	Roman Koudelka	Czech Republic	87.0	44.0	48.0	87.9	Q
37	45	Shohei Tochimoto	Japan	86.5	43.0	49.5	87.4	Q
38	18	Vitaliy Shumbarets	Ukraine	87.0	44.0	51.0	84.8	Q
39	4	Oleksandr Lazarovych	Ukraine	84.5	39.0	48.5	84.7	Q
40	2	Carl Nordin	Sweden	86.0	42.0	47.5	84.0	Q
41	35	Jernej Damjan	Slovenia	84.5	39.0	49.5	81.9	
41	8	Siim-Tanel Sammelselg	Estonia	87.0	44.0	48.5	81.9	
43	13	Kim Hyun-Ki	South Korea	84.5	39.0	48.0	81.4	
44	21	Roman Trofimov	Russia	84.5	39.0	47.0	81.2	
45	17	Evgeni Levkin	Kazakhstan	84.5	39.0	50.0	80.9	
46	24	Choi Heung-Chul	South Korea	82.0	34.0	49.0	77.0	
47	15	Alexey Korolev	Kazakhstan	83.5	37.0	49.5	76.1	
48	20	Fredrik Balkaasen	Sweden	82.5	35.0	49.0	74.8	
48	16	Illimar Pärn	Estonia	85.0	40.0	47.0	74.8	
50	3	Tomáš Zmoray	Slovakia	79.0	28.0	46.0	73.4	
51	26	Davide Bresadola	Italy	76.0	22.0	46.5	71.6	
52	9	Volodymyr Boshchuk	Ukraine	79.0	28.0	46.5	71.1	
53	1	Remus Tudor	Romania	79.5	29.0	46.0	70.1	
54	6	Diego Dellasega	Italy	77.0	24.0	47.0	60.6	
*	57	Kamil Stoch	Poland	N/A	N/A	N/A	N/A	Q ,
*	58	Gregor Schlierenzauer	Austria	100.0	70.0	N/A	N/A	Q ,
*	59	Severin Freund	Germany	N/A	N/A	N/A	N/A	Q ,
*	60	Matti Hautamäki	Finland	81.5	33.0	N/A	N/A	Q ,
*	61	Martin Koch	Austria	92.5	55.0	N/A	N/A	Q ,
*	62	Tom Hilde	Norway	94.5	59.0	N/A	N/A	Q ,
*	63	Andreas Kofler	Austria	95.5	61.0	N/A	N/A	Q ,
*	64	Adam Małysz	Poland	100.5	71.0	N/A	N/A	Q ,
*	65	Simon Ammann	Switzerland	N/A	N/A	N/A	N/A	Q ,
*	66	Thomas Morgenstern	Austria	N/A	N/A	N/A	N/A	Q ,
	25	Mackenzie Boyd-Clowes	Canada				DNS	
	27	Peter Frenette	United States				DNS	

1: These skiers were pre-qualified; they did perform jumps in the qualification round, but were not ranked with the non-pre-qualified jumpers.

=== Competition Round ===
Rank	Bib	Name	Country	Round 1 Distance (m)	Round 1 Points	Round 1 Rank	Final Round Distance (m)	Final Round Points	Final Round Rank	Total Points
1st place, gold medalist(s)	50	Thomas Morgenstern	Austria	101.5	129.9	1	107.0	139.3	1	269.2
2nd place, silver medalist(s)	47	Andreas Kofler	Austria	99.5	123.3	2	105.0	136.8	2	260.1
3rd place, bronze medalist(s)	48	Adam Małysz	Poland	97.5	120.7	3	102.0	131.5	3	252.2
4	49	Simon Ammann	Switzerland	97.5	117.3	5	101.5	130.3	4	247.6
5	46	Tom Hilde	Norway	94.0	115.3	8	101.5	129.5	5	244.8
6	41	Kamil Stoch	Poland	94.0	113.9	10	101.0	126.6	6	240.5
7	43	Severin Freund	Germany	95.5	115.5	7	100.0	123.3	8	238.8
8	42	Gregor Schlierenzauer	Austria	93.5	114.2	9	98.0	121.0	11	235.2
9	34	Anders Bardal	Norway	97.0	115.9	6	98.5	116.7	16	232.6
10	23	Anssi Koivuranta	Finland	98.5	118.4	4	94.0	113.5	21	231.9
11	35	Michael Uhrmann	Germany	93.5	107.7	21	99.5	123.5	7	231.2
12	19	Sebastian Colloredo	Italy	96.0	113.9	10	97.0	116.5	17	230.4
13	38	Daiki Ito	Japan	92.5	107.8	19	98.0	122.1	9	229.9
14	27	Martin Schmitt	Germany	93.5	110.1	15	97.5	119.3	12	229.4
15	36	Anders Jacobsen	Norway	92.5	107.1	22	99.0	121.9	10	229.0
16	24	Denis Kornilov	Russia	96.0	109.5	17	98.0	119.3	12	228.8
17	30	Peter Prevc	Slovenia	94.0	109.9	16	95.0	114.7	19	224.6
18	21	Olli Muotka	Finland	97.5	113.4	12	94.5	110.7	24	224.1
19	14	Piotr Żyła	Poland	93.5	108.0	18	96.0	116.0	18	224.0
20	22	Janne Ahonen	Finland	96.0	111.2	13	94.0	111.8	22	223.0
21	45	Martin Koch	Austria	90.0	103.4	29	97.5	119.0	14	222.4
21	25	Jakub Janda	Czech Republic	91.0	104.5	26	96.5	117.9	15	222.4
23	33	Pavel Karelin	Russia	95.0	110.8	14	92.0	107.3	29	218.1
24	20	Taku Takeuchi	Japan	93.0	104.3	27	95.5	113.6	20	217.9
25	17	Andrea Morassi	Italy	91.5	104.6	25	95.0	111.3	23	215.9
26	31	Noriaki Kasai	Japan	93.5	107.8	19	92.5	107.9	28	215.7
27	18	Borek Sedlák	Czech Republic	93.0	106.8	23	93.0	108.2	27	215.0
28	28	Emmanuel Chedal	France	94.0	105.8	24	94.0	108.9	26	214.7
29	10	Andreas Küttel	Switzerland	91.5	102.2	30	93.5	109.2	25	211.4
30	4	Nikolay Karpenko	Kazakhstan	94.0	103.7	28	86.0	90.9	30	194.6
31	29	Shohei Tochimoto	Japan	91.0	101.7	31				101.7
32	32	Robert Kranjec	Slovenia	90.5	100.2	32				100.2
33	7	Radik Zhaparov	Kazakhstan	91.5	99.8	33				99.8
34	15	Vladimir Zografski	Bulgaria	90.5	99.7	34				99.7
35	37	Roman Koudelka	Czech Republic	89.5	99.2	35				99.2
36	3	Vincent Descombes Sevoie	France	90.0	95.9	36				95.9
37	39	Wolfgang Loitzl	Austria	86.0	93.2	37				93.2
38	44	Matti Hautamäki	Finland	84.5	91.7	38				91.7
39	12	Dimitry Vassiliev	Russia	86.0	91.4	39				91.4
40	13	Mitja Mežnar	Slovenia	85.0	91.2	40				91.2
41	9	Vitaliy Shumbarets	Ukraine	86.0	88.6	41				88.6
42	16	Lukáš Hlava	Czech Republic	84.0	88.2	42				88.2
43	5	Pascal Egloff	Switzerland	86.5	87.8	43				87.8
44	26	Pascal Bodmer	Germany	84.5	87.6	44				87.6
45	8	Marco Grigoli	Switzerland	86.5	87.3	45				87.3
46	40	Johan Remen Evensen	Norway	90.0	85.1	46				85.1
46	6	Nicolas Mayer	France	84.5	85.1	46				85.1
48	1	Carl Nordin	Sweden	83.5	80.0	48				80.0
48	2	Oleksandr Lazarovych	Ukraine	83.5	80.0	48				80.0
50	11	Tomasz Byrt	Poland	80.5	76.9	50				76.9
