= 2009–10 FIS Ski Jumping World Cup =

Ski jumping championship season

Winners
- Overall: (Switzerland) Simon Ammann
- Ski Flying: (Slovenia) Robert Kranjec
- Four Hills Tournament: (Austria) Andreas Kofler
- Nordic Tournament: (Switzerland) Simon Ammann
- FIS Team Tour: Austria
- Nations Cup: Austria

Competitions
- Venues: 16
- Individual: 23
- Team: 4
- Cancelled: 1
- Rescheduled: 3

The 2009–10 FIS Ski Jumping World Cup was the 31st World Cup season in ski jumping and the 13th official World Cup season in ski flying with thirteenth small crystal globe awarded.

Season began in Kuusamo, Finland on 26 November 2009 and finished at Holmenkollen, Norway on 14 March 2010. The individual World Cup was overall winner was Simon Ammann first and so far the only one for Switzerland, he also won Nordic Tournament. Robert Kranjec won Ski Flying title and Andreas Kofler won 4H Tournament. Nations Cup was taken by Team of Austria.

Simon Ammann had an outstanding season by winning WC overall (with 9 wins), becoming double individual olympic gold champion (large and normal hill) and ski flying world champion.

23 men's individual events on 16 different venues in 7 countries were organised on two different continents (Europe and Asia); three individual events were cancelled; both cancelled events from Trondheim (due to technical problems) were rescheduled to Lillehammer and one cancelled event from Harrachov (due to lack of snow and warm temperatures) to Engelberg; another cancelled event from Harrachov was not replaced. There were also four Men's team events.

Peaks of the season were Winter Olympics, FIS Ski Flying World Championships, the Four Hills Tournament, Nordic Tournament and FIS Team Tour.

== Map of world cup hosts ==
Europe
Germany	Austria	Asia

== Calendar ==
=== Men's Individual ===
L – large hill / F – flying hill
All	No.	Date	Place (Hill)	Size	Winner	Second	Third	Overall leader	R.
710	1	28 November 2009	(Finland) Kuusamo (Rukatunturi HS142)	L _{492}	(Norway) Bjørn Einar Romøren	(Germany) Pascal Bodmer	(Austria) Wolfgang Loitzl	(Norway) Bjørn Einar Romøren	
		5 December 2009	(Norway) Trondheim (Granåsen HS140)	L _{cnx}	cancelled due to technical problems (both rescheduled in Lillehammer on same dates)			—	
		6 December 2009	(Norway) Trondheim (Granåsen HS140)	L _{cnx}	cancelled due to technical problems (both rescheduled in Lillehammer on same dates)			—	
711	2	(Note: Cancelled event from Trondheim (5 December) was rescheduled to Lillehammer (on the same day).)5 December 2009	(Norway) Lillehammer (Lysgårdsbakken HS138)	L _{493}	(Austria) Gregor Schlierenzauer	(Austria) Thomas Morgenstern	(Poland) Adam Małysz	(Norway) Bjørn Einar Romøren	
712	3	(Note: Cancelled event from Trondheim (6 December) was rescheduled to Lillehammer (on the same day).)6 December 2009	(Norway) Lillehammer (Lysgårdsbakken HS138)	L _{494}	(Switzerland) Simon Ammann	(Finland) Harri Olli	(France) Emmanuel Chedal	(Austria) Gregor Schlierenzauer	
		12 December 2009	(Czech Republic) Harrachov (Čerťák HS142)	L _{cnx}	cancelled due to lack of snow and warm temperatures (one competition rescheduled in Engelberg on 18 December)			—	
		13 December 2009	(Czech Republic) Harrachov (Čerťák HS142)	L _{cnx}	cancelled due to lack of snow and warm temperatures (one competition rescheduled in Engelberg on 18 December)			—	
713	4	(Note: One of cancelled event from Harrachov (12 or 13 December) was rescheduled to Engelberg (18 December).)18 December 2009	(Switzerland) Engelberg (Gross-Titlis HS137)	L _{495}	(Switzerland) Simon Ammann	(Austria) Gregor Schlierenzauer	(Austria) Thomas Morgenstern	(Switzerland) Simon Ammann	
714	5	19 December 2009	(Switzerland) Engelberg (Gross-Titlis HS137)	L _{496}	(Austria) Gregor Schlierenzauer	(Switzerland) Simon Ammann	(Austria) Andreas Kofler	(Austria) Gregor Schlierenzauer	
715	6	20 December 2009	(Switzerland) Engelberg (Gross-Titlis HS137)	L _{497}	(Switzerland) Simon Ammann	(Norway) Bjørn Einar Romøren	(Japan) Daiki Ito	(Switzerland) Simon Ammann	
716	7	29 December 2009	(Germany) Oberstdorf (Schattenberg HS137)	L _{498}	(Austria) Andreas Kofler	(Finland) Janne Ahonen	(Austria) Thomas Morgenstern	(Switzerland) Simon Ammann	
717	8	1 January 2010	(Germany) Garmisch-Pa (G. Olympiaschanze HS140)	L _{499}	(Austria) Gregor Schlierenzauer	(Austria) Wolfgang Loitzl	(Switzerland) Simon Ammann	(Switzerland) Simon Ammann	
718	9	3 January 2010	(Austria) Innsbruck (Bergiselschanze HS130)	L _{500}	(Austria) Gregor Schlierenzauer	(Switzerland) Simon Ammann	(Finland) Janne Ahonen	(Austria) Gregor Schlierenzauer	
719	10	6 January 2010	(Austria) Bischofshofen (Paul-Ausserleitner HS140)	L _{501}	(Austria) Thomas Morgenstern	(Finland) Janne Ahonen	(Switzerland) Simon Ammann	(Switzerland) Simon Ammann	
58th Four Hills Tournament Overall (29 December 2009 – 6 January 2010)					(Austria) Andreas Kofler	(Finland) Janne Ahonen	(Austria) Wolfgang Loitzl	4H Tournament	
720	11	9 January 2010	(Austria) Bad Mitterndorf (Kulm HS200)	F _{076}	(Slovenia) Robert Kranjec	(Switzerland) Simon Ammann	(Austria) Martin Koch	(Switzerland) Simon Ammann	
721	12	10 January 2010	(Austria) Bad Mitterndorf (Kulm HS200)	F _{077}	(Austria) Gregor Schlierenzauer	(Slovenia) Robert Kranjec	(Finland) Harri Olli	(Austria) Gregor Schlierenzauer	
722	13	16 January 2010	(Japan) Sapporo (Ōkurayama HS134)	L _{502}	(Austria) Thomas Morgenstern	(Germany) Andreas Wank	(Japan) Daiki Ito	(Switzerland) Simon Ammann	
723	14	17 January 2010	(Japan) Sapporo (Ōkurayama HS134)	L _{503}	(Switzerland) Simon Ammann	(Japan) Noriaki Kasai	(Austria) Martin Koch	(Switzerland) Simon Ammann	
724	15	22 January 2010	(Poland) Zakopane (Wielka Krokiew HS134)	L _{504}	(Austria) Gregor Schlierenzauer	(Switzerland) Simon Ammann	(Austria) Thomas Morgenstern	(Switzerland) Simon Ammann	
725	16	23 January 2010	(Poland) Zakopane (Wielka Krokiew HS134)	L _{505}	(Austria) Gregor Schlierenzauer	(Switzerland) Simon Ammann	(Austria) Thomas Morgenstern	(Switzerland) Simon Ammann	
726	17	31 January 2010	(Germany) Oberstdorf (Heini-Klopfer HS213)	F _{078}	(Norway) Anders Jacobsen	(Slovenia) Robert Kranjec	(Norway) Johan Remen Evensen	(Switzerland) Simon Ammann	
727	18	3 February 2010	(Germany) Klingenthal (Vogtland Arena HS140)	L _{506}	(Switzerland) Simon Ammann	(Poland) Adam Małysz	(Austria) Gregor Schlierenzauer	(Switzerland) Simon Ammann	
728	19	6 February 2010	(Germany) Willingen (Mühlenkopf HS145)	L _{507}	(Austria) Gregor Schlierenzauer	(Norway) Anders Jacobsen	(Germany) Michael Neumayer	(Switzerland) Simon Ammann	
2nd FIS Team Tour Overall; TWO TEAM EVENTS INCLUDED (30 January – 7 February 2010)					Austria	Norway	Germany	FIS Team Tour	
2010 Winter Olympics (13 – 20 February • (Canada) Whistler – Vancouver)
729	20	7 March 2010	(Finland) Lahti (Salpausselkä HS130)	L _{508}	(Switzerland) Simon Ammann	(Poland) Adam Małysz	(Austria) Thomas Morgenstern	(Switzerland) Simon Ammann	
730	21	9 March 2010	(Finland) Kuopio (Puijo HS127)	L _{509}	(Switzerland) Simon Ammann	(Poland) Adam Małysz	(Norway) Anders Jacobsen	(Switzerland) Simon Ammann	
731	22	12 March 2010	(Norway) Lillehammer (Lysgårdsbakken HS138)	L _{510}	(Switzerland) Simon Ammann	(Austria) Gregor Schlierenzauer	(Poland) Adam Małysz	(Switzerland) Simon Ammann	
732	23	14 March 2010	(Norway) Oslo (Holmenkollbakken HS134)	L _{511}	(Switzerland) Simon Ammann	(Poland) Adam Małysz	(Austria) Andreas Kofler	(Switzerland) Simon Ammann	
14th Nordic Tournament Overall (7 – 14 March 2010)					(Switzerland) Simon Ammann	(Poland) Adam Małysz	(Austria) Thomas Morgenstern	Nordic Tournament	
31st FIS World Cup Overall (28 November 2009 – 14 March 2010)					(Switzerland) Simon Ammann	(Austria) Gregor Schlierenzauer	(Austria) Thomas Morgenstern	World Cup Overall	
FIS Ski Flying World Championships 2010 (19 – 20 March • (Slovenia) Planica)

=== Men's Team ===
All	No.	Date	Place (Hill)	Size	Winner	Second	Third	R.
46	1	27 November 2009	(Finland) Kuusamo (Rukatunturi HS142)	L _{037}	Austria Wolfgang Loitzl; Andreas Kofler; Gregor Schlierenzauer; Thomas Morgenstern	Germany Michael Uhrmann; Michael Neumayer; Pascal Bodmer; Martin Schmitt	Finland Matti Hautamäki; Kalle Keituri; Harri Olli; Janne Ahonen	
47	2	30 January 2010	(Germany) Oberstdorf (Heini-Klopfer HS213)	F _{009}	Austria Martin Koch; Andreas Kofler; Wolfgang Loitzl; Gregor Schlierenzauer	Norway Johan Remen Evensen; Tom Hilde; Anders Jacobsen; Bjørn Einar Romøren	Finland Matti Hautamäki; Kalle Keituri; Janne Ahonen; Harri Olli	
48	3	7 February 2010	(Germany) Willingen (Mühlenkopfschanze HS145)	L _{038}	Germany Michael Neumayer; Pascal Bodmer; Martin Schmitt; Michael Uhrmann	Norway Johan Remen Evensen; Tom Hilde; Anders Jacobsen; Bjørn Einar Romøren	Austria Florian Schabereiter; Michael Hayböck; Stefan Thurnbichler; David Zauner	
2nd FIS Team Tour Overall; THREE INDIVIDUAL EVENTS INCLUDED (30 January – 7 February 2010)					Austria	Norway	Germany	
49	4	6 March 2010	(Finland) Lahti (Salpausselkä HS130)	L _{039}	Norway Anders Bardal; Roar Ljøkelsøy; Tom Hilde; Anders Jacobsen	Austria Wolfgang Loitzl; Martin Koch; Andreas Kofler; Thomas Morgenstern	Germany Michael Uhrmann; Martin Schmitt; Andreas Wank; Michael Neumayer	

== Standings ==
=== Overall ===
Rank	after 23 events	Points
1	(Switzerland) Simon Ammann	1649
2	(Austria) Gregor Schlierenzauer	1368
3	(Austria) Thomas Morgenstern	944
4	(Austria) Andreas Kofler	893
5	(Poland) Adam Małysz	842
6	(Austria) Wolfgang Loitzl	760
7	(Norway) Anders Jacobsen	557
8	(Austria) Martin Koch	545
9	(Norway) Bjørn Einar Romøren	517
10	(Slovenia) Robert Kranjec	503

=== Nations Cup ===
Rank	after 27 events	Points
1	Austria	6858
2	Norway	3117
3	Germany	2884
4	Finland	2093
5	Switzerland	1910
6	Poland	1806
7	Slovenia	1504
8	Japan	1412
9	Czech Republic	981
10	France	524

=== Prize money ===
Rank	after 27 events	Points
1	(Switzerland) Simon Ammann	164,900
2	(Austria) Gregor Schlierenzauer	151,600
3	(Austria) Andreas Kofler	109,800
4	(Austria) Thomas Morgenstern	107,050
5	(Austria) Wolfgang Loitzl	96,500
6	(Poland) Adam Małysz	84,200
7	(Norway) Anders Jacobsen	74,200
8	(Austria) Martin Koch	67,400
9	(Norway) Bjørn Einar Romøren	62,700
10	(Germany) Michael Uhrmann	59,850

=== Ski Flying ===
Rank	after 3 events	Points
1	(Slovenia) Robert Kranjec	260
2	(Austria) Gregor Schlierenzauer	181
3	(Switzerland) Simon Ammann	175
4	(Austria) Martin Koch	155
5	(Norway) Anders Jacobsen	120
6	(Czech Republic) Antonín Hájek	118
7	(Norway) J. Remen Evensen	115
8	(Poland) Adam Małysz	108
9	(Austria) Wolfgang Loitzl	98
10	(Finland) Janne Ahonen	75

=== Four Hills Tournament ===
Rank	after 4 events	Points
1	(Austria) Andreas Kofler	1027.2
2	(Finland) Janne Ahonen	1013.9
3	(Austria) Wolfgang Loitzl	1011.6
4	(Austria) Gregor Schlierenzauer	1011.1
5	(Switzerland) Simon Ammann	1008.3
6	(Austria) Thomas Morgenstern	987.1
7	(Germany) Pascal Bodmer	936.2
8	(Austria) Martin Koch	935.0
9	(Poland) Adam Małysz	932.9
10	(Norway) Anders Jacobsen	927.5

=== Nordic Tournament ===
Rank	after 4 events	Points
1	(Switzerland) Simon Ammann	1077.6
2	(Poland) Adam Małysz	1033.0
3	(Austria) Thomas Morgenstern	990.4
4	(Austria) Gregor Schlierenzauer	969.0
5	(Austria) David Zauner	965.5
6	(Austria) Andreas Kofler	955.8
7	(Austria) Wolfgang Loitzl	924.2
8	(Japan) Noriaki Kasai	891.9
9	(France) Emmanuel Chedal	891.7
10	(Slovenia) Peter Prevc	880.7

=== FIS Team Tour ===
Rank	after 4 events	Points
1	Austria	4311.3
2	Norway	4298.4
3	Germany	4085.8
4	Slovenia	3819.1
5	Finland	3739.5
6	Czech Republic	3684.6
7	Japan	3103.6
8	Poland	2801.9
9	France	1824.4
10	Switzerland	1480.4

== See also ==
- 2009 Grand Prix (top level summer series)
- 2009–10 FIS Continental Cup (2nd level competition)
