= Nordic Tournament 2010 =

The 2010 Nordic Tournament was the fourth edition and took place in Falun, Trondheim and Oslo between 7–14 March 2010.

== Results ==
Date	Place	Hill	Size	Winner	Second	Third	Ref.
7 Mar 2010	(Finland) Lahti	Salpausselkä HS 130	LH	(Switzerland) Simon Ammann	(Poland) Adam Małysz	(Austria) Thomas Morgenstern	
9 Mar 2010	(Finland) Kuopio	Puijo HS 127 (night)	LH	(Switzerland) Simon Ammann	(Poland) Adam Małysz	(Norway) Anders Jacobsen	
12 Mar 2010	(Norway) Lillehammer	Lysgårdsbakken HS 138	LH	(Switzerland) Simon Ammann	(Austria) Gregor Schlierenzauer	(Poland) Adam Małysz	
14 Mar 2010	(Norway) Oslo	Holmenkollbakken HS 134	LH	(Switzerland) Simon Ammann	(Poland) Adam Małysz	(Austria) Andreas Kofler	

== Overall ==
Pos	Ski Jumper	Points
1	(Switzerland) Simon Ammann	1077.6
2	(Poland) Adam Małysz	1033.0
3	(Austria) Thomas Morgenstern	990.4
4	(Austria) Gregor Schlierenzauer	969.0
5	(Austria) David Zauner	965.5
6	(Austria) Andreas Kofler	955.8
7	(Austria) Wolfgang Loitzl	924.2
8	(Japan) Noriaki Kasai	891.9
9	(France) Emmanuel Chedal	891.7
10	(Slovenia) Peter Prevc	880.7
