= FIS Team Tour 2010 =

The FIS Team Tour 2010 was a team competition that took place at Oberstdorf, Klingenthal and Willingen located in Germany, between 30 January and 7 February 2010.

== Results ==
Date	Place	Hill	Size	Winner	Second	Third	Ref.
30 Jan 2010	(Germany) Oberstdorf	Heini-Klopfer-Skiflug. HS 213 (night)	FH	Austria; Martin Koch; Andreas Kofler; Wolfgang Loitzl; Gregor Schlierenzauer	Norway; Johan Remen Evensen; Tom Hilde; Anders Jacobsen; Bjørn Einar Romøren	Finland; Matti Hautamäki; Kalle Keituri; Janne Ahonen; Harri Olli	
31 Jan 2010	(Germany) Oberstdorf	Heini-Klopfer-Skiflugschanze HS 213	FH	(Norway) Anders Jacobsen	(Slovenia) Robert Kranjec	(Norway) Johan Remen Evensen	
3 Feb 2010	(Germany) Klingenthal	Vogtland Arena HS 140 (night)	LH	(Switzerland) Simon Ammann	(Poland) Adam Małysz	(Austria) Gregor Schlierenzauer	
6 Feb 2010	(Germany) Willingen	Mühlenkopfschanze HS 145 (night)	LH	(Austria) Gregor Schlierenzauer	(Norway) Anders Jacobsen	(Germany) Michael Neumayer	
7 Feb 2010	(Germany) Willingen	Mühlenkopfschanze HS 145	LH	Germany; Michael Neumayer; Pascal Bodmer; Martin Schmitt; Michael Uhrmann	Norway; Johan Remen Evensen; Tom Hilde; Anders Jacobsen; Bjørn Einar Romøren	Austria; Florian Schabereiter; Michael Hayböck; Stefan Thurnbichler; David Zauner	

== Overall ==
Pos	Ski Jumper	Points
1	Austria	4311.3
2	Norway	4298.4
3	Germany	4085.8
4	Slovenia	3819.1
5	Finland	3739.5
6	Czech Republic	3684.6
7	Japan	3103.6
8	Poland	2801.9
9	France	1824.4
10	Switzerland	1480.4
