= 2009–10 Four Hills Tournament =

Ski jumping competition

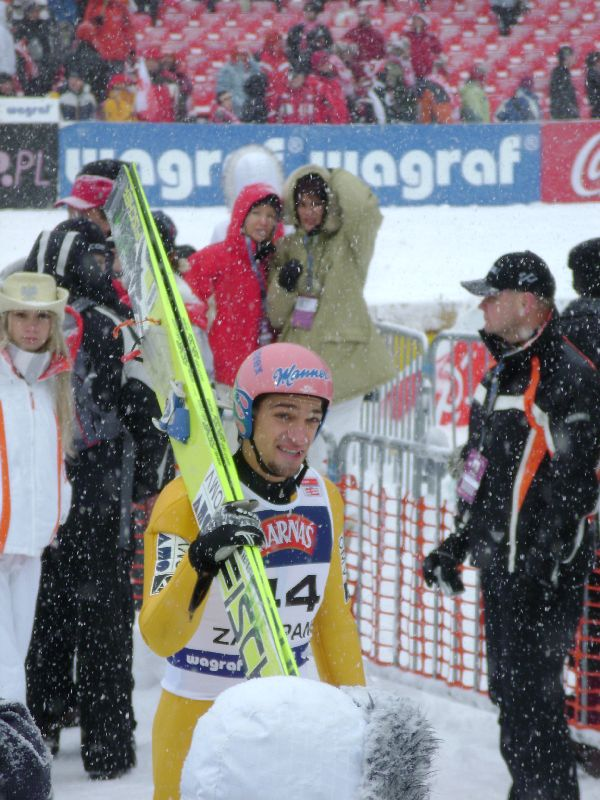
Andreas Kofler, winner of the 2009–10 Four Hills Tournament

The 2009–10 Four Hills Tournament was held at the four traditional venues of Oberstdorf, Garmisch-Partenkirchen, Innsbruck and Bischofshofen, located in Germany and Austria, between 29 December 2009 and 6 January 2010.

== Overall standings ==
Rank	Name	Nationality	Oberstdorf (finish)	Garmisch-Partenkirchen (finish)	Innsbruck (finish)	Bischofshofen (finish)	Overall FHT points
1	Andreas Kofler	Austria	265.2 (1)	271.9 (4)	235.1 (4)	255.0 (5)	1027.2
2	Janne Ahonen	Finland	253.3 (2)	259.2 (6)	237.4 (3)	264.0 (2)	1013.9
3	Wolfgang Loitzl	Austria	245.4 (4)	272.5 (2)	232.8 (6)	260.9 (4)	1011.6
4	Gregor Schlierenzauer	Austria	228.8 (9)	277.7 (1)	251.1 (1)	253.5 (6)	1011.1
5	Simon Ammann	Switzerland	236.6 (5)	272.4 (3)	237.8 (2)	261.5 (3)	1008.3

== Oberstdorf ==
HS 137 Schattenbergschanze, Germany
29 December 2009

Rank	Name	Nationality	1st (m)	2nd (m)	Points	Overall FHT Points	Overall WC points (Rank)
1	Andreas Kofler	Austria	125.0	134.0	265.2	265.2 (1)	376 (3)
2	Janne Ahonen	Finland	116.5	137.0	253.3	255.3 (2)	170 (11)
3	Thomas Morgenstern	Austria	124.5	126.5	250.3	250.3 (3)	239 (4)
4	Wolfgang Loitzl	Austria	124.0	124.0	245.4	245.4 (4)	241 (6)
5	Simon Ammann	Switzerland	119.5	125.0	236.6	236.6 (5)	469 (1)

== Garmisch-Partenkirchen ==
HS 140 Große Olympiaschanze, Germany
1 January 2010

Rank	Name	Nationality	1st (m)	2nd (m)	Points	Overall FHT Points	Overall WC points (Rank)
1	Gregor Schlierenzauer	Austria	136.5	137.5	277.7	506.5 (5)	511 (2)
2	Wolfgang Loitzl	Austria	135.0	135.0	272.5	517.9 (2)	321 (5)
3	Simon Ammann	Switzerland	132.0	143.5	272.4	509.0 (4)	529 (1)
4	Andreas Kofler	Austria	136.0	137.0	271.9	537.1 (1)	426 (3)
5	Anders Jacobsen	Norway	136.0	134.0	269.5	459.8 (14)	127 (16)

== Innsbruck ==
HS 130 Bergiselschanze, Austria
3 January 2010

Rank	Name	Nationality	1st (m)	2nd (m)	Points	Overall FHT Points	Overall WC points (Rank)
1	Gregor Schlierenzauer	Austria	130.0	122.0	251.1	757.6 (2)	611 (1)
2	Simon Ammann	Switzerland	128.5	117.5	237.8	746.8 (5)	609 (2)
3	Janne Ahonen	Finland	128.0	117.5	237.4	749.9 (4)	270 (7)
4	Andreas Kofler	Austria	126.0	118.5	235.1	772.2 (1)	476 (3)
5	Anders Jacobsen	Norway	126.5	117.0	234.3	694.1 (9)	172 (15)

== Bischofshofen ==
HS 140 Paul-Ausserleitner-Schanze, Austria
6 January 2010

Rank	Name	Nationality	1st (m)	2nd (m)	Points	Overall FHT Points	Overall WC points (Rank)
1	Thomas Morgenstern	Austria	133.0	136.0	264.7	987.1 (6)	440 (4)
2	Janne Ahonen	Finland	134.0	133.5	264.0	1013.9 (2)	350 (7)
3	Simon Ammann	Switzerland	136.0	131.5	261.5	1008.3 (5)	669 (1)
4	Wolfgang Loitzl	Austria	130.5	135.0	260.9	1011.6 (3)	411 (5)
5	Andreas Kofler	Austria	129.0	133.5	255.0	1027.2 (1)	521 (3)

== See also ==
- 2009–10 Ski Jumping World Cup
