= Ski jumping at the 2010 Winter Olympics =

Ski Jumping at the XXI Olympic Winter Games
- Venue: Whistler Olympic Park
- Dates: February 12–22, 2010
- Competitors: 68 from 18 nations

The ski jumping competition of the Vancouver 2010 Olympics was held at Whistler Olympic Park between 12 and 22 February 2010.

== Medal summary ==
=== Medal table ===
Rank	Nation	Gold	Silver	Bronze	Total
1	Switzerland	2	0	0	2
2	Austria	1	0	2	3
3	Poland	0	2	0	2
4	Germany	0	1	0	1
5	Norway	0	0	1	1
Totals (5 entries)		3	3	3	9

=== Events ===
Three ski jumping events was held at Vancouver 2010 (all competitors are men):

Event	Gold		Silver		Bronze	
Normal hill individual	Simon Ammann; Switzerland	276.5	Adam Małysz; Poland	269.5	Gregor Schlierenzauer; Austria	268.0
Large hill individual	Simon Ammann; Switzerland	283.6	Adam Małysz; Poland	269.4	Gregor Schlierenzauer; Austria	262.2
Large hill team	Austria; Wolfgang Loitzl; Andreas Kofler; Thomas Morgenstern; Gregor Schlierenzauer	1107.9	Germany; Michael Neumayer; Andreas Wank; Martin Schmitt; Michael Uhrmann	1035.8	Norway; Anders Bardal; Tom Hilde; Johan Remen Evensen; Anders Jacobsen	1030.3

== Competition schedule ==
All times are Pacific Standard Time (UTC-8).

Day	Date	Start	Finish	Event	Phase
Day 1	Friday, 2010-02-12	10:00	11:05	Individual Normal Hill	Qualification
Day 2	Saturday, 2010-02-13	9:45	11:25	Individual Normal Hill	Final
Day 8	Friday, 2010-02-19	10:00	11:05	Individual Large Hill	Qualification
Day 9	Saturday, 2010-02-20	11:30	13:10	Individual Large Hill	Final
Day 11	Monday, 2010-02-22	10:00	11:55	Team Large Hill	Qualification and Final

== Participating nations ==
Nations	Individuals	Team
Austria	4	X
Canada	4	X
Czech Republic	5	X
Finland	5	X
France	4	X
Germany	5	X
Italy	3	
Japan	4	X
Kazakhstan	2	
South Korea	3	
Norway	5	X
Poland	5	X
Russia	4	X
Slovakia	1	
Slovenia	5	X
Switzerland	2	
Ukraine	3	
United States	4	X
Total: 18 NOCs	68	12

For the three events, there are a maximum 70 athletes allowed to compete. No nation can have more than five skiers. For each event, a nation can enter four skiers in individual event or one team in the team event.

Host nation Canada is expected to enter skiers in all events. If no skier meets the qualification standards, they can enter one skier per event.

Quota allocation per nation is based on the World Ranking List (WRL) consisting of Ski Jumping World Cup and Grand Prix points, followed by Continental Cup Standings from the 2008-09 and 2009-10 Ski Jumping World Cup. This will be made by assigning one quota slot per skier from the top of the standings downwards until the maximum five slots have been reached, including host nation Canada. When 60 slots are reached in an event where less than 12 nations have a minimum of four skiers allocated slot (and the nation is entered in the team event), the next nation with three skiers will be given a fourth slot until 12 nations can compete in the team event. Any open quota slots will be allocated until the maximum 70 skiers can be reached, including host nation Canada. This process started on 18 January 2010 and ran until 28 January 2010. Deadline to VANOC was 1 February 2010.
