= Ski jumping at the FIS Nordic World Ski Championships 2007 =

The ski jumping at the FIS Nordic World Ski Championships 2007 was part of the FIS Nordic World Ski Championships 2007 that took place in Sapporo, Japan, on February 24, February 25, and March 3, 2007.

== Individual normal (HS100) hill ==
On March 3, 2007, at the Miyanomori (HS100) jumping hill, Slovenia's Rok Benkovič was the defending champion and finished 27th in this event at these games. Adam Małysz (Poland) won his fourth gold medal handily by having the longest jumps in both rounds of competition, the largest margin of victory in the event's history at the World Championships. The two World Cup leaders, Anders Jacobsen (Norway) and Gregor Schlierenzauer (Austria), finished seventh and eighth respectively.

Medal	Athlete	Jump 1 (m)	Jump 2 (m)	Total points
Gold	Adam Małysz (POL)	102.0	99.5	277.0
Silver	Simon Ammann (SUI)	96.5	96.0	255.5
Bronze	Thomas Morgenstern (AUT)	95.0	95.0	254.5
4	Roar Ljøkelsøy (NOR)	94.5	92.5	246.5
5	Andreas Küttel (SUI)	95.5	92.0	244.0
6	Andreas Kofler (AUT)	94.0	93.5	243.0
7	Anders Jacobsen (NOR)	91.5	94.0	241.5
8	Gregor Schlierenzauer (AUT)	92.5	93.0	240.5
9	Dimitry Ipatov (RUS)	93.5	93.0	240.0
10	Dimitry Vassiliev (RUS)	94.0	92.5	239.5

== Individual large (HS134) hill ==
February 24, 2007 at the Okurayama (HS134) jumping hill. Janne Ahonen of Finland was the defending champion and finished sixth at these championships. The current top three leaders in the 2006-7 ski jumping World Cup, Anders Jacobsen (Norway), Gregor Schlierenzauer (Austria), and Adam Małysz (Poland), all performed to less than expectations, finishing 14th, tenth, and fourth respectively. Olli had the longest jump of the competition with his second-round jump of 136.5 m, but lost to Ammann on style points.

Medal	Athlete	Jump 1 (m)	Jump 2 (m)	Total points
Gold	Simon Ammann (SUI)	125.0	134.5	266.1
Silver	Harri Olli (FIN)	124.0	136.5	265.9
Bronze	Roar Ljøkelsøy (NOR)	123.0	135.0	262.9
4	Adam Małysz (POL)	123.0	133.0	258.3
5	Thomas Morgenstern (AUT)	122.0	131.5	255.3
6	Janne Ahonen (FIN)	123.0	130.0	249.9
7	Dimitry Vassiliev (RUS)	121.0	125.5	235.2
8	Andreas Kofler (AUT)	118.0	125.0	231.9
9	Martin Koch (AUT)	117.5	123.5	225.3
10	Gregor Schlierenzauer (AUT)	115.0	124.5	223.6

== Team large (HS134) hill ==
February 25, 2007 at the Okurayama (HS134) jumping hill. The Austrian team of Wolfgang Loitzl, Andreas Widhölzl, Thomas Morgenstern, and Martin Höllwarth were the defending champions and successfully defended their title despite Schlierenzauer having the weakest jumps of the entire team. The Japanese team delighted the home crowd by winning their first major medal since their silver medal victory at the 2003 FIS Nordic World Ski Championships in Val di Fiemme which was also in team large hill. FIS Vice-President Yoshiro Ito, who is also Sapporo 2007 organizing committee vice president and president of the Japanese Ski Association, expressed his delight in the Japanense ski jumping team's bronze medal win in the team large hill competition. Ito also expressed his satisfaction that both the Sapporo residents and the competitors are pleased at the organization of the event has run smoothly so far. Switzerland's Simon Ammann had the longest jumps of both rounds of competition with distances of 136.0 m and 135.5 m, respectively, though his Swiss teammates did not perform as well, causing them to finish seventh in the event.

Medal	Team	Jumpers	Jump 1 (m)	Jump 2 (m)	Points
Gold	Austria	Wolfgang Loitzl	125.0	133.5	1000.2
Gold	Austria	Gregor Schlierenzauer	123.5	117.5	1000.2
Gold	Austria	Andreas Kofler	130.0	128.5	1000.2
Gold	Austria	Thomas Morgenstern	126.0	125.0	1000.2
Silver	Norway	Tom Hilde	122.5	130.5	953.3
Silver	Norway	Anders Bardal	119.0	114.5	953.3
Silver	Norway	Anders Jacobsen	122.0	117.0	953.3
Silver	Norway	Roar Ljøkelsøy	134.0	126.5	953.3
Bronze	Japan	Shohhei Tochimoto	118.0	110.0	905.9
Bronze	Japan	Takanobu Okabe	121.0	120.0	905.9
Bronze	Japan	Daiki Ito	117.0	131.5	905.9
Bronze	Japan	Noriaki Kasai	128.0	117.5	905.9
4	Finland	Arttu Lappi	104.5	112.5	869.8
4	Finland	Matti Hautamäki	119.0	112.5	869.8
4	Finland	Harri Olli	123.0	135.0	869.8
4	Finland	Janne Ahonen	124.0	119.0	869.8
5	Poland	Kamil Stoch	129.0	120.0	857.2
5	Poland	Piotr Żyła	115.0	111.5	857.2
5	Poland	Robert Mateja	106.5	94.5	857.2
5	Poland	Adam Małysz	133.5	131.5	857.2
6	Russia	Dimitry Ipatov	125.5	130.5	849.5
6	Russia	Ilya Rosliakov	117.0	113.0	849.5
6	Russia	Denis Kornilov	120.5	107.0	849.5
6	Russia	Dimitry Vassiliev	113.5	110.5	849.5
