= Ski jumping at the FIS Nordic World Ski Championships 2009 =

At the FIS Nordic World Ski Championships 2009 in Liberec, Czech Republic, four ski jumping events were held with three for men and one for women. It was the first time women's ski jumping took place and was so successful that FIS President Gian Franco Kasper hoped to include the event for the 2014 Winter Olympics in Sochi, Russia with possible inclusion into a team event. American Lindsay Van was the first winner of the women's individual normal hill event, the first North American to medal in ski jumping at the world championship, and the first American woman to medal at the world championships. The three World Cup leaders each won a medal in the men's individual normal hill event with 2008-09 Four Hills Tournament winner Wolfgang Loitzl of Austria earning gold, the first individual of his career at the world championships. Loitzl's teammate Gregor Schlierenzauer would win silver in the same event with both teaming up to win gold in the team large hill event, given the Austrians three medals. Norway would also win three medals with a silver in the team large hill and bronzes from Anders Jacobsen (men's individual large hill) and Anette Sagen (women's individual normal hill). Switzerland and Germany each won two medals. Overall, six nations won medals, including Japan, who had the same team that had won the bronze medal in the team large hill at the previous championships in Sapporo, Japan.

== Men's events ==
=== Individual normal hill ===
21 February. Poland's Adam Małysz was the defending champion, but would finish 22nd. Finland's Harri Olli had the longest jump of the first round with 104.5 meters, but would falter badly in the second round with an 87 m jump to finish 13th. Austria's Thomas Morgenstern, who had the longest jump of the second round with 101.5 metres, fell during landing and finished 8th. Loitzl, second after the first round, won the second round thanks to high judge marks to earn his first individual gold of the world championships.

Medal	Athlete	Jump 1 (m)	Jump 2 (m)	Points
Gold	Wolfgang Loitzl (AUT)	103.5	99.0	282.0
Silver	Gregor Schlierenzauer (AUT)	102.0	99.0	275.0
Bronze	Simon Ammann (SUI)	102.0	99.5	274.5

=== Individual large hill ===
27 February. Simon Ammann of Switzerland was the defending champion, and finished eighth. Because of unstable weather conditions, the result after the first jump stands as the official result. It was the first individual medal for both Küttel and Jacobsen

Medal	Athlete	Jump 1 (m)	Points
Gold	Andreas Küttel (SUI)	133.5	141.3
Silver	Martin Schmitt (GER)	133.0	140.9
Bronze	Anders Jacobsen (NOR)	132.5	139.5

=== Team large hill ===
28 February. The Austrian team of Wolfgang Loitzl, Gregor Schlierenzauer, Andreas Kofler, and Thomas Morgenstern were the defending champions and were able to defend with Martin Koch taking Kofler's place. Loitzl had the longest jumps of both rounds to lead Austria to a repeat victory. The weather was overcast and rainy for both rounds of competition.

Medal	Team	Jumpers	Jump 1 (m)	Jump 2 (m)	Points
Gold	Austria	Wolfgang Loitzl	131.0	136.0	1034.3
Gold	Austria	Martin Koch	121.0	134.0	1034.3
Gold	Austria	Thomas Morgenstern	123.0	123.0	1034.3
Gold	Austria	Gregor Schlierenzauer	127.5	123.0	1034.3
Silver	Norway	Anders Bardal	128.0	133.0	1000.8
Silver	Norway	Tom Hilde	122.0	129.0	1000.8
Silver	Norway	Johan Remen Evensen	118.5	129.0	1000.8
Silver	Norway	Anders Jacobsen	126.5	117.5	1000.8
Bronze	Japan	Shohhei Tochimoto	123.5	127.0	981.2
Bronze	Japan	Takanobu Okabe	127.0	135.0	981.2
Bronze	Japan	Daiki Ito	118.5	123.5	981.2
Bronze	Japan	Noriaki Kasai	122.0	120.0	981.2

== Women's event ==
=== Individual normal hill ===
20 February. This event debuted at these championships. Van is the first American woman to medal at the world championships. Sagen and Gräßler tied for the longest jump in the first round while Van had the longest jump in the second round.

Medal	Athlete	Jump 1 (m)	Jump 2 (m)	Points
Gold	Lindsey Van (USA)	89.0 m	97.5 m	243.0
Silver	Ulrike Grässler (GER)	93.5 m	93.0 m	239.0
Bronze	Anette Sagen (NOR)	93.5 m	94.0 m	238.5
