= Puijo ski jumping hill =

Complex of four ski jumping hills in Kuopio, Finland

Puijo
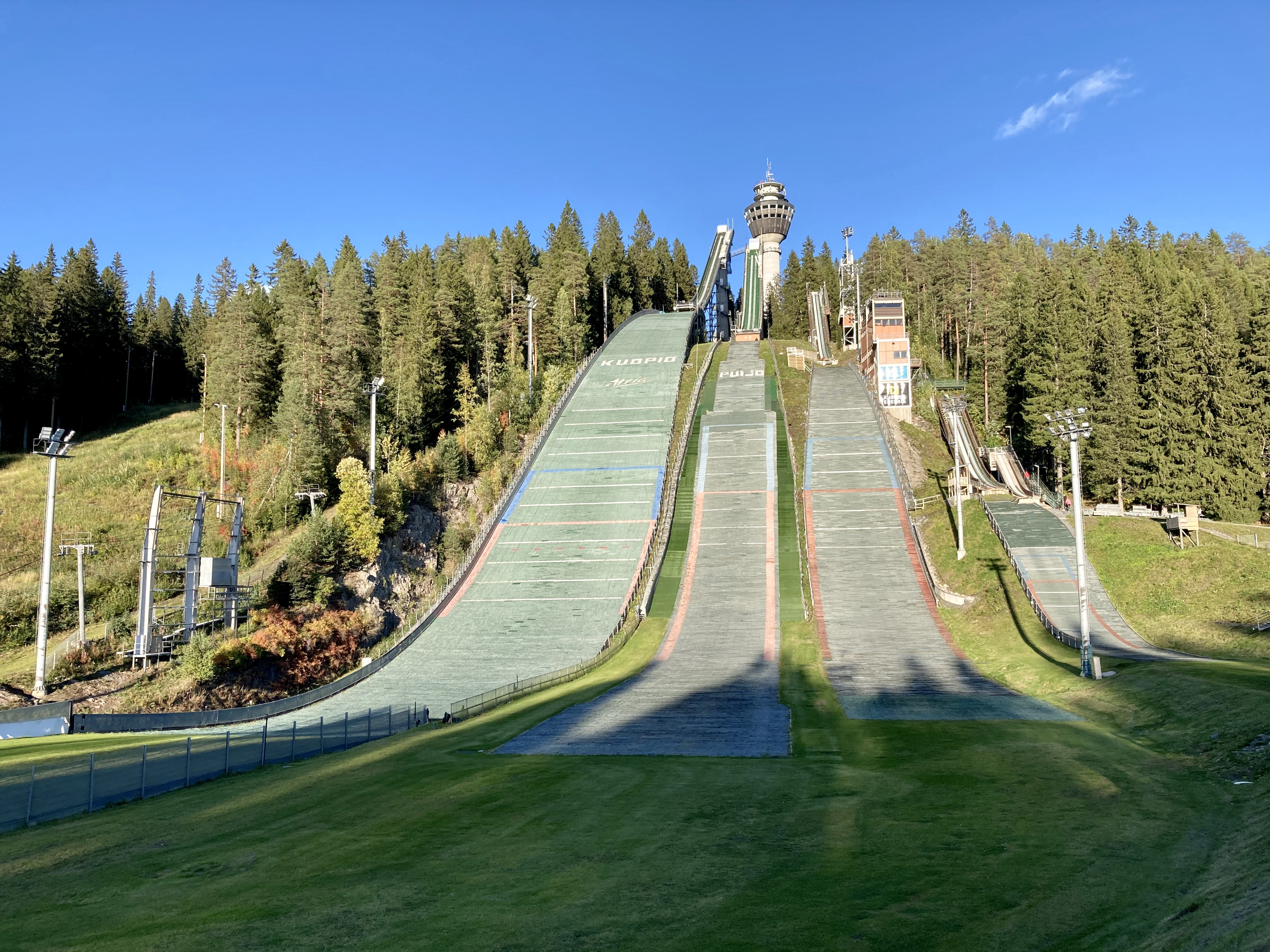
- All hills from left to right: K-120, K-90, K-65, K-28
- Location: Kuopio; Finland
- Coordinates: 62°54′34″N 027°39′21″E
- Opened: 1998

Size
- K–point: K-120; K-90; K-65; K-28
- Hill size: HS 127 (K-120); HS 98 (K-90)
- Hill record: K-120: (Norway) Daniel-André Tande (136 m, 22 Feb 2016); K-90: (Switzerland) Simon Ammann (106.5 m, 10 Mar 2015)

The Puijo ski jumping hills (Finnish: Puijon hyppyrimäet) are a complex of five ski jumping hills in the city of Kuopio, Finland. They are located on the 150-metre-high Puijo hill, overlooked by the Puijo observation tower.

== History ==
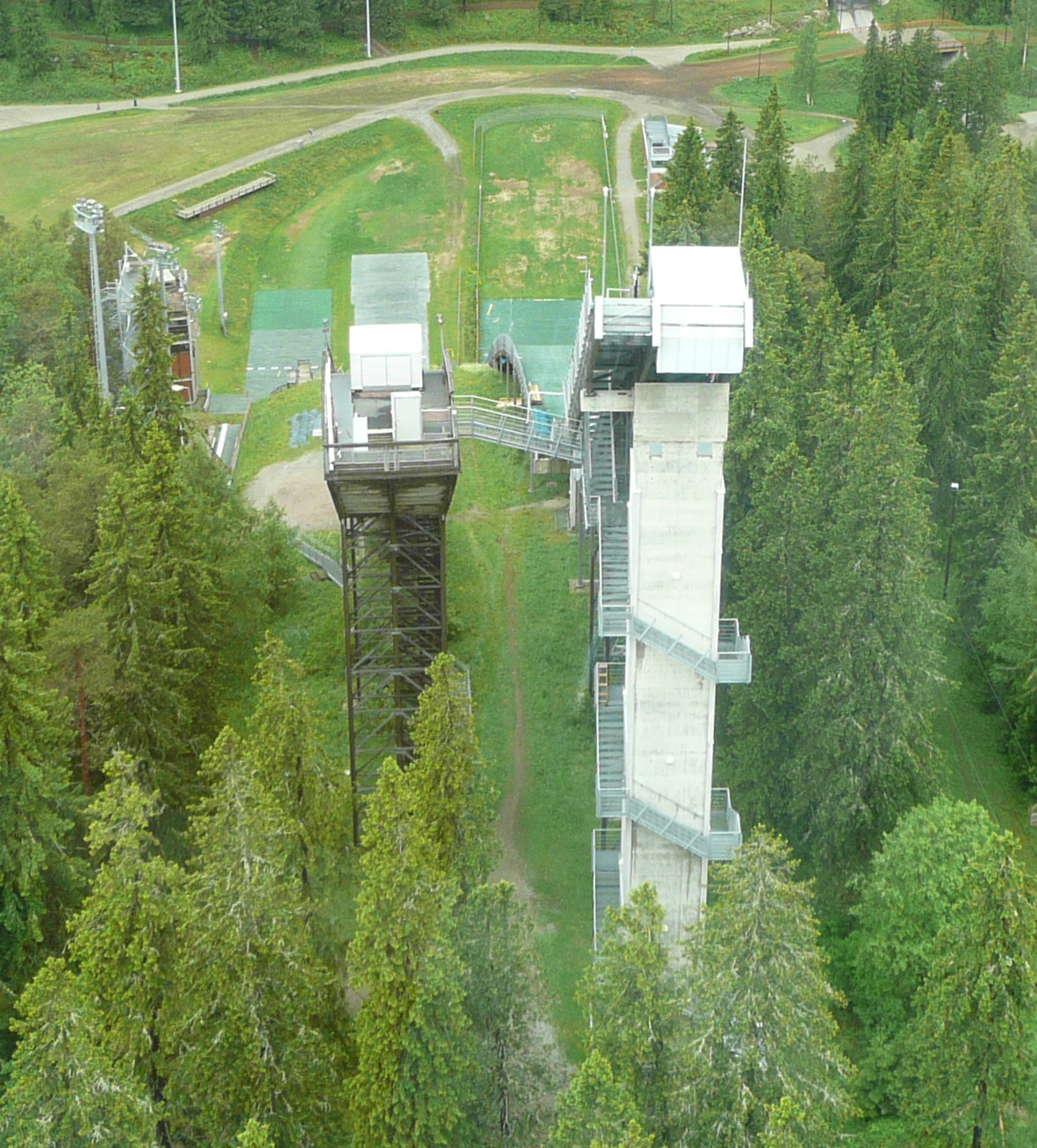
View from Puijo tower

The first documented ski jumping competition at Puijo took place in 1886. The first proper jumping hill was erected in around 1900, with jumps of up to 14 metres reportedly made on this hill. Ten years later, an additional 20-metre hill was constructed.

In 1949, a K-90 normal hill was built at Puijo, which at the time was the largest hill in Finland. In 1958, a K-65 hill was added to the complex. The first World Cup competition to be held at Puijo was on 1 February 1995, on the K-90 hill.

In 1998, a K-120 large hill was constructed and used for the first time on 4 March 1999. This hill has not been modified since, and remains in primary use for World Cup events. On 10 March 2015, the K-90 hill saw use again for the first time since 4 March 1998, due to strong winds cancelling the scheduled K-120 event.

For a certain time, the first annual competition of the World Cup—the so-called "Nordic Opening"—took place at Puijo. Since 2002–03, the season opener has traditionally been at Ruka. For several years, Puijo has been the second event of the Nordic Tournament.

== HS 127 / K-120 (large hill) ==
Since 2004, the second competition of the Nordic Tournament has been held on the large hill at Puijo. On 10 March 2009, Japanese veteran Takanobu Okabe was a surprise winner of the event, achieving his first win in a decade. It would be his last win before retirement.

=== Hill record ===
- 136 m – (Norway) Daniel-André Tande, 22 February 2016

== HS 98 / K-90 (normal hill) ==
Kuopio's normal hill is a venue for FIS Cup events.

=== Hill record ===
- 106.5 m – (Switzerland) Simon Ammann, 10 March 2015
