= Emmanuel Chedal =

French former ski jumper

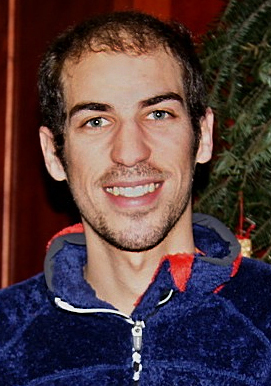
- Chedal in 2011

Personal information
- Nationality: France
- Born: 15 January 1983 (age 43) Moûtiers, Savoie, Rhône-Alpes, France

Sport
- Sport: Skiing

World Cup career
- Seasons: 1999; 2000–2013
- Indiv. podiums: 1

Achievements and titles
- Personal bests: 215.5 m (707 ft); Planica, Mar 2009
- Updated on 3 February 2016

Emmanuel Chedal (born 15 January 1983 in Moûtiers) is a French former ski jumper who competed from 1998 to 2013. He participated at the 2002 Winter Olympics in Salt Lake City and at the 2010 Winter Olympics in Vancouver, earning his best result of ninth place in the large hill team competition at the latter.

Chedal's best result at the Ski Jumping World Championships was eighth in the large hill team competition in Liberec in 2009. His best finish at the Ski Flying World Championships was also eighth in the team competition in Oberstdorf in 2008. At World Cup level, his best result was third in an individual large hill competition in Lillehammer on 6 December 2009.

Chedal retired from the sport following the 2012/13 season.
