= Nordic Tournament =

Annual international ski jumping competition

- Status: defunct
- Genre: sporting event
- Date: February–March
- Frequency: annual
- Country: Finland; Norway; Sweden
- Inaugurated: 1997
- Most recent: 2010

The Nordic Tournament was an annual ski jumping tournament that was a part of the FIS Ski Jumping World Cup. The tournament started in 1997 as a counterpart to the widely successful Four Hills Tournament in Germany and Austria. The final edition was held in 2010.

The tournament was traditionally held in March and was hosted by venues in Finland and Norway. Some of the earlier (unofficial) editions also included a venue in Sweden.

== Hills ==
Place	Hill	K-Point	Hill Size
Lahti, Finland	Salpausselkä	K-116	HS 130
Kuopio, Finland	Puijo	K-120	HS 127
Trondheim, Norway	Granåsen	K-123	HS 140
Oslo, Norway	Nye Holmenkollbakken	K-120	HS 134

=== Other hills ===
- Falun K-115, HS-128
- Lillehammer K-123, HS-138
- Vikersund K-185, HS-207

== Winners ==
*	Winner of all four events in the same year

Year	Winner	Country
1997	Kazuyoshi Funaki	Japan
1998	Andreas Widhölzl	Austria
1999	Noriaki Kasai	Japan
2000	Sven Hannawald	Germany
2001	Adam Małysz	Poland
2002	Matti Hautamäki	Finland
2003	Adam Małysz	Poland
2004	Roar Ljøkelsøy	Norway
2005	Matti Hautamäki*	Finland
2006	Thomas Morgenstern	Austria
2007	Adam Małysz	Poland
2008	Gregor Schlierenzauer	Austria
2009	Gregor Schlierenzauer	Austria
2010	Simon Ammann*	Switzerland
