= Harri Olli =

Finnish ski jumper

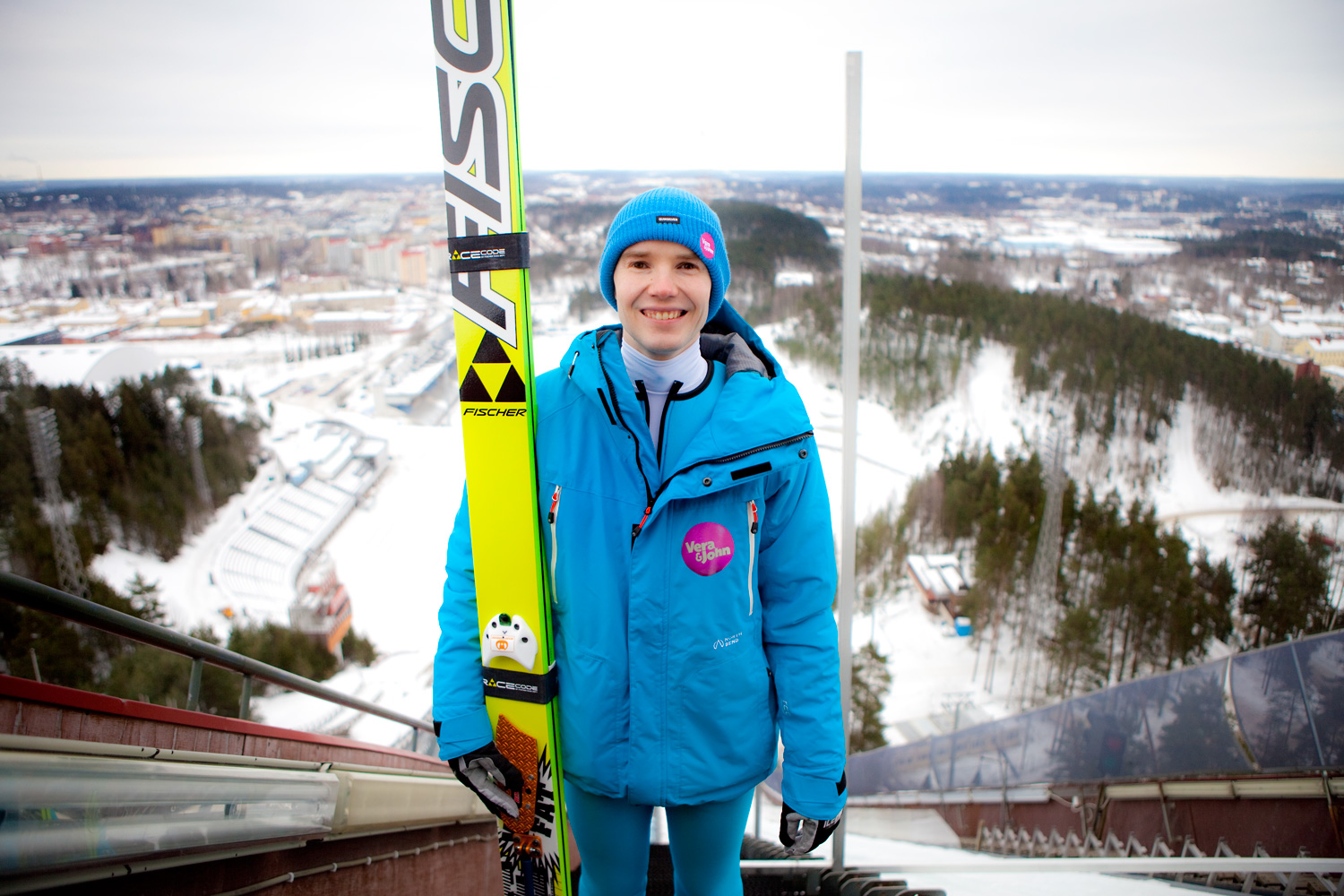
- Olli in Lahti, 2015

Personal information
- Full name: Harri Juhani Olli
- Nationality: Finland
- Born: 15 January 1985 (age 41) Rovaniemi, Finland
- Height: 1.72 m (5 ft 8 in)

Sport
- Sport: Skiing

World Cup career
- Seasons: 2003–2004; 2006–2011; 2015–2016
- Indiv. starts: 98
- Indiv. podiums: 7
- Indiv. wins: 3
- Team starts: 17
- Team podiums: 10
- Team wins: 2

Achievements and titles
- Personal bests: 225.5 m (740 ft); Oberstdorf, 14 February 2009
Medal record
Men's ski jumping
World Championships
Silver medal – second place	2007 Sapporo	Individual LH
Men's ski flying
World Championships
Silver medal – second place	2008 Oberstdorf	Team
Bronze medal – third place	2010 Planica	Team
- Updated on 20 March 2018

Harri Juhani Olli (born 15 January 1985) is a Finnish former ski jumper who competed at World Cup level from 2002 to 2016. He scored three individual World Cup wins, four individual Continental Cup wins, and an individual silver medal at the 2007 World Championships.

== Career ==
Before the FIS Ski Flying World Championships 2008 in Oberstdorf, Olli had had a night out in a bar. Nonetheless, both his jumps were over 200 metres, which gave him the sixth place in the final results.

In August 2008 Olli was dismissed from the national team for a second time. He had been drunk during the Summer Grand Prix tour in central Europe and was late for the ride to the competition venue next morning. In July the police caught Olli for drunk driving and heavy speeding near Lapinlahti. Olli won one competition and placed third in another during the Summer tour. Olli took his first World Cup win in Oberstdorf on 14 February 2009 with both jumps over 200 metres, including a hill record of 225.5 m which has stood for 8 years. He has since won two more World Cup events, both in early 2009.

Olli again had alcohol-related problems before the opening of the 2009/10 season. He was having a dispute with his fiancée in a bar room and a drinking glass was used as a striking weapon.

His 2009/10 season was characterized by sporadic bouts of good form. For much of the early season he maintained a position in the pre-qualified top 10, but as his performance curve dipped and he dropped outside the pre-qualified places, he sometimes did not qualify at all—something that seemed less to do with talent and more to do with attitude. Upon questioning by British Eurosport commentator David Goldstrom, the Finnish coach Janne Väätäinen stated that Olli's apparent disinterest stemmed more from "frustration" and shyness than a bad attitude to ski jumping. The Finnish team nonetheless maintained faith in his ability and talent and during the 2010 Vancouver Olympics. Olli competed in all three events, although he was disqualified in the normal hill event due to a suit violation. In the large hill event Olli placed 18th, the highest ranking Finn, after a poor first effort and the disqualification of Janne Happonen, as well as Janne Ahonen's knee injury. In the team event, Olli acted as anchorman in place of Ahonen, improving under the weight of responsibility and making two very good and consistent efforts. However, due to a sudden flurry of good form for the Norwegian team, Finland placed just outside the medals in a closely fought final round.

In the 2009/10 World Cup season, Olli finished 14th overall; 13th in the ski flying standings; 12th in the Four Hills Tournament; and 11th in the Nordic Tour.

In the 2010 Summer Grand Prix, Olli finished 11th overall.

On 28 November 2010 Olli was suspended by the FIS for one competition after 'flipping the bird' to the media camera after his poor qualification jump of 77 m which left him in 57th place. Subsequently, the Finnish Ski Association suspended Olli from the national team for an undisclosed period of time; this was now the third time in as many years that Olli had been suspended from the national team. Finnish coach Pekka Niemelä stated in an interview after the incident that Olli had "personal problems", but there was speculation that Olli felt he was "thrown under the bus" by the event jury's decision to make him jump despite the bad wind conditions—conditions which the wind and gate compensation system did not seem able to adequately resolve.

In an interview on the FIS Ski Jumping website, Olli stated that he had "no goals" for the 2010/11 season, other than to be an "all-round happy athlete" and to "jump well". When asked as to whether he was certain that the season would be successful, Olli replied "I'm not sure about that." On 21 December 2013 in Lahti, he restarted his active career in the Continental Cup and had sporadic appearances in the latter half of the 2014–15 World Cup season.

Olli is a student of mathematics at the University of Rovaniemi, although his place of residence is Lahti.

== World Cup ==
=== Standings ===
Season	Overall	4H	SF	NT
2002/03	—	—	N/A	—
2003/04	70	—	N/A	—
2005/06	36	45	N/A	21
2006/07	28	21	N/A	29
2007/08	26	—	N/A	—
2008/09	4	7	2nd place, silver medalist(s)	2nd place, silver medalist(s)
2009/10	14	12	13	11
2010/11	82	—	—	N/A
2014/15	85	—	54	N/A

=== Wins ===
No.	Season	Date	Location	Hill	Size
1	2008/09	14 February 2009	(Germany) Oberstdorf	Heini-Klopfer-Skiflugschanze HS213 (night)	FH
2	2008/09	13 March 2009	(Norway) Lillehammer	Lysgårdsbakken HS138 (night)	LH
3	2008/09	22 March 2009	(Slovenia) Planica	Letalnica bratov Gorišek HS215	FH
