= Gregor Schlierenzauer =

Austrian ski jumper (born 1990)

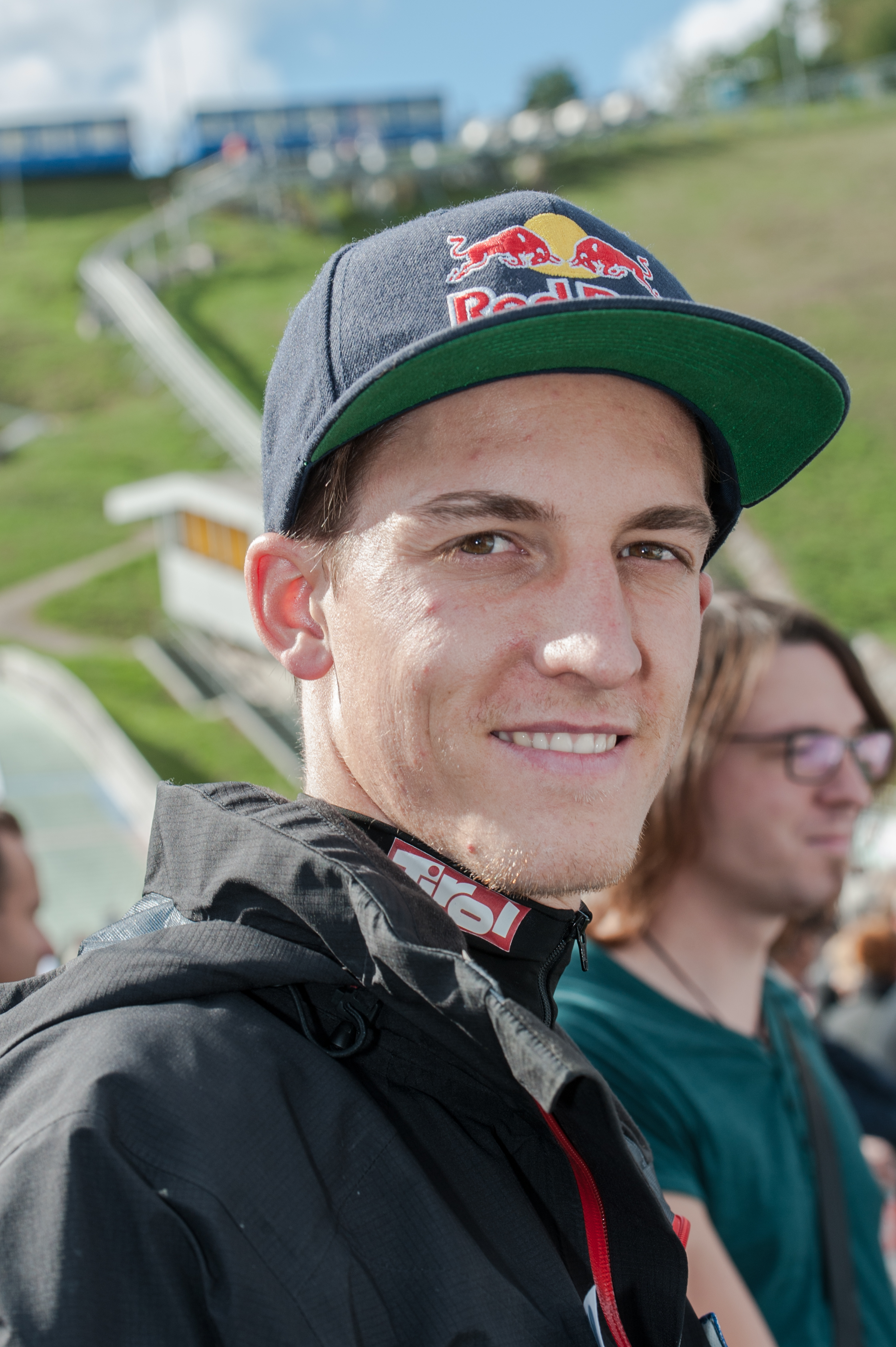
- Schlierenzauer in Hinzenbach, 2015

Personal information
- Nationality: Austria
- Born: 7 January 1990 (age 36) Innsbruck, Tyrol, Austria
- Height: 1.80 m (5 ft 11 in)

Sport
- Sport: Skiing
- Club: SV Innsbruck–Bergisel

World Cup career
- Seasons: 2006–2021
- Indiv. starts: 275
- Indiv. podiums: 88
- Indiv. wins: 53
- Team starts: 50
- Team podiums: 36
- Team wins: 17
- Overall titles: 2 (2009, 2013)
- Four Hills titles: 2 (2012, 2013)
- Ski Flying titles: 3 (2009, 2011, 2013)
- Nordic titles: 2 (2008, 2009)

Achievements and titles
- Personal bests: 243.5 m (799 ft); Vikersund, 12 February 2011
Medal record
Men's ski jumping
Event	1st	2nd	3rd
Winter Olympics	1	1	2
World Championships	6	5	1
Ski Flying World Championships	4	1	0
Total	11	7	3
Olympic Games
Gold medal – first place	2010 Vancouver	Team LH
Silver medal – second place	2014 Sochi	Team LH
Bronze medal – third place	2010 Vancouver	Individual NH
Bronze medal – third place	2010 Vancouver	Individual LH
World Championships
Gold medal – first place	2007 Sapporo	Team LH
Gold medal – first place	2009 Liberec	Team LH
Gold medal – first place	2011 Oslo	Team NH
Gold medal – first place	2011 Oslo	Individual LH
Gold medal – first place	2011 Oslo	Team LH
Gold medal – first place	2013 Val di Fiemme	Team LH
Silver medal – second place	2009 Liberec	Individual NH
Silver medal – second place	2013 Val di Fiemme	Mixed team NH
Silver medal – second place	2013 Val di Flemme	Individual NH
Silver medal – second place	2015 Falun	Individual LH
Silver medal – second place	2015 Falun	Team LH
Bronze medal – third place	2017 Lahti	Team LH
Men's ski flying
World Championships
Gold medal – first place	2008 Oberstdorf	Individual
Gold medal – first place	2008 Oberstdorf	Team
Gold medal – first place	2010 Planica	Team
Gold medal – first place	2012 Vikersund	Team
Silver medal – second place	2010 Planica	Individual
- Updated on 21 September 2021

Gregor Schlierenzauer (pronounced [ˈʃliːʁənt͡saʊ̯ɐ]; born 7 January 1990) is an Austrian former ski jumper who competed from 2006 to 2021. He is one of the most successful ski jumpers of all time, having won 53 individual World Cup competitions, the most of any male ski jumper; the Ski Jumping World Cup overall title, the Four Hills Tournament, and Nordic Tournament twice each; the Ski Flying World Cup overall title three times; as well as four medals at the Winter Olympics, twelve at the Ski Jumping World Championships, and five at the Ski Flying World Championships.

During his victorious 2008–09 World Cup season, Schlierenzauer set a number of ski jumping records, including surpassing Janne Ahonen's record of twelve individual World Cup wins in a season with thirteen; and also tying Ahonen, Matti Hautamäki, and Thomas Morgenstern's record of six consecutive individual wins in a single season. On 26 January 2013, Schlierenzauer equalled Matti Nykänen's long-standing record of 46 individual World Cup wins; he would go on to achieve a total of 53 wins.

On 21 September 2021, he announced the end of his athletic career on his website.

== Early and personal life ==
Gregor Schlierenzauer was born on 7 January 1990 in Innsbruck, Tyrol, to Paul and Angelika Schlierenzauer. The second of three children, he has an older sister, Gloria, and a younger brother, Lukas. His uncle is Markus Prock, the winner of three Winter Olympic medals in men's luge, who settled him a contract with Fischer Skis in 2001 and a few years later with Red Bull. Schlierenzauer has been deaf in his left ear since birth. He is also the cousin of luger Hannah Prock.

At age eight, Schlierenzauer began training in ski jumping at SV Innsbruck–Bergisel club. He attended an ordinary Austrian grammar school, however, due to tight schedules in both sport and school, he had problems keeping up with his class work. Schlierenzauer then enrolled at Skigymnasium Stams in Austria, the world's oldest ski-sport training center and boarding secondary school. He currently resides in Fulpmes, Tyrol.

Schlierenzauer began competing professionally in the 2005/06 season in the Continental Cup, then only fifteen years old. In February 2006, he won the gold medal at the Junior World Championships in Kranj, Slovenia and then Alex Pointner, the coach of the Austrian professional team, called him to compete in the World Cup. Schlierenzauer debuted in the World Cup finishing in 24th place at the Holmenkollen Ski Festival on 12 March 2006.

== Ski jumping career ==
=== 2006/07 World Cup ===
On 3 December 2006, Schlierenzauer took his first World Cup victory in Lillehammer, Norway, and became one of the youngest jumpers to ever win a world cup competition. He also won in Oberstdorf, Germany, at the Four Hills Tournament 2006/07. During the Four Hills Tournament, Finnish newspapers claimed that Schlierenzauer was extremely underweight, however, no evidence has ever been found to substantiate this accusation. He won the fourth competition, in Bischofshofen, Austria, on his 17th birthday, but finished the tournament in second place, behind Anders Jacobsen (Norway), and in front of Simon Ammann (Switzerland).

Schlierenzauer took fourth place in World Cup 2006/07. He was second, but Adam Małysz from Poland ended up taking the first-place position from Anders Jacobsen, so Schlierenzauer finished third. His coach deemed the event in Planica too demanding for 17-year-old Schlierenzauer, so he did not compete there and ended finishing fourth, behind Adam Małysz, Anders Jacobsen and Simon Ammann.

=== 2007/08 World Cup ===
At the beginning of the World Cup 2007/08, Schlierenzauer took 2nd place on the World Cup list, behind his teammate Thomas Morgenstern. He also took 2nd place in Oberstdorf, Germany, during the Four Hills Tournament 2007/08. He won 1st place in Garmisch-Partenkirchen, Germany. He took 8th place at the competition in Bischofshofen which was originally to be held in Innsbruck but was moved due to strong winds. He was one of the favorites for the tournament, but, due to variable weather conditions, arrived only in 42nd position in the first series and did not enter the second series. At the end of the Four Hills Tournament, he ended up in 12th place.

He skipped the competitions in Predazzo, where Tom Hilde from Norway took his first World Cup victory, and in Harrachov. On 25 January 2008, Schlierenzauer took his second World Cup victory in Zakopane, Poland. He also skipped the competition in Sapporo, ruining his chance to take the first-place position from his Austrian teammate Thomas Morgenstern.

After two-second-place finishes in Liberec and an eighth-place finish in Willingen, he took part in the FIS Ski Flying World Championships in Oberstdorf in 2008. After four series of competing, he won the gold medal, on 23 February 2008. The next day, on 24 February, the Austrian team, composed of (Schlierenzauer-Thomas Morgenstern-Koch-Kofler) won gold in the team competition.

He also took part in the 2008 Nordic Tournament. He took the second and fourth place at the two competitions in Kuopio and in Lahti which was moved to Kuopio because of bad weather). Winning at the competitions in Lillehammer and Oslo, he won the 2008 Nordic Tournament.

After consecutively winning the last four individual competitions of the season, Schlierenzauer ranked second overall in the 2007/08 World Cup, 233 points behind his teammate Thomas Morgenstern. In March 2008, he improved the Austrian national record on flying hills to 233.5 meters, which was also the longest jump of Planica 2008 ski jumping events.

=== 2008/09 World Cup ===
On 11 February 2009, Schlierenzauer became only the fourth jumper to win 6 consecutive World Cup events, tying the record held by Austrian teammate Thomas Morgenstern and Finns Janne Ahonen and Matti Hautamäki. The run of victories came to an end in Oberstdorf during the ski flying event on 14 February, when Schlierenzauer arrived in 8th position.

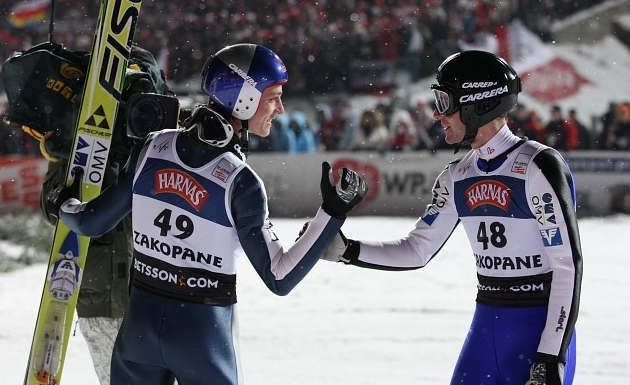
Gregor Schlierenzauer (left) & Wolfgang Loitzl (right) at Zakopane 2009

On 21 February he won silver in the individual normal hill event at the FIS Nordic World Ski Championships 2009 in Liberec behind fellow Austrian and Four Hills winner Wolfgang Loitzl. One week later, Schlierenzauer won gold in the team large hill event.

He returned to winning ways in individual competition on 8 March at Lahti, Finland, taking his number of wins to 11 for that season, one victory shy of Janne Ahonen's record of 12 wins in one season.

On 20 March he won the ski flying event at Planica, taking his number of wins to 13 for the season record, record of 20 podiums in a season and clinching the 2008/09 world cup title with two flying events left to run. He also achieved a record of 2083 points in the World Cup over a single season, becoming the first person to obtain more than 2000 points. The current records of wins, podiums and points in a single world cup season is held by Peter Prevc.

=== 2009/10 World Cup ===
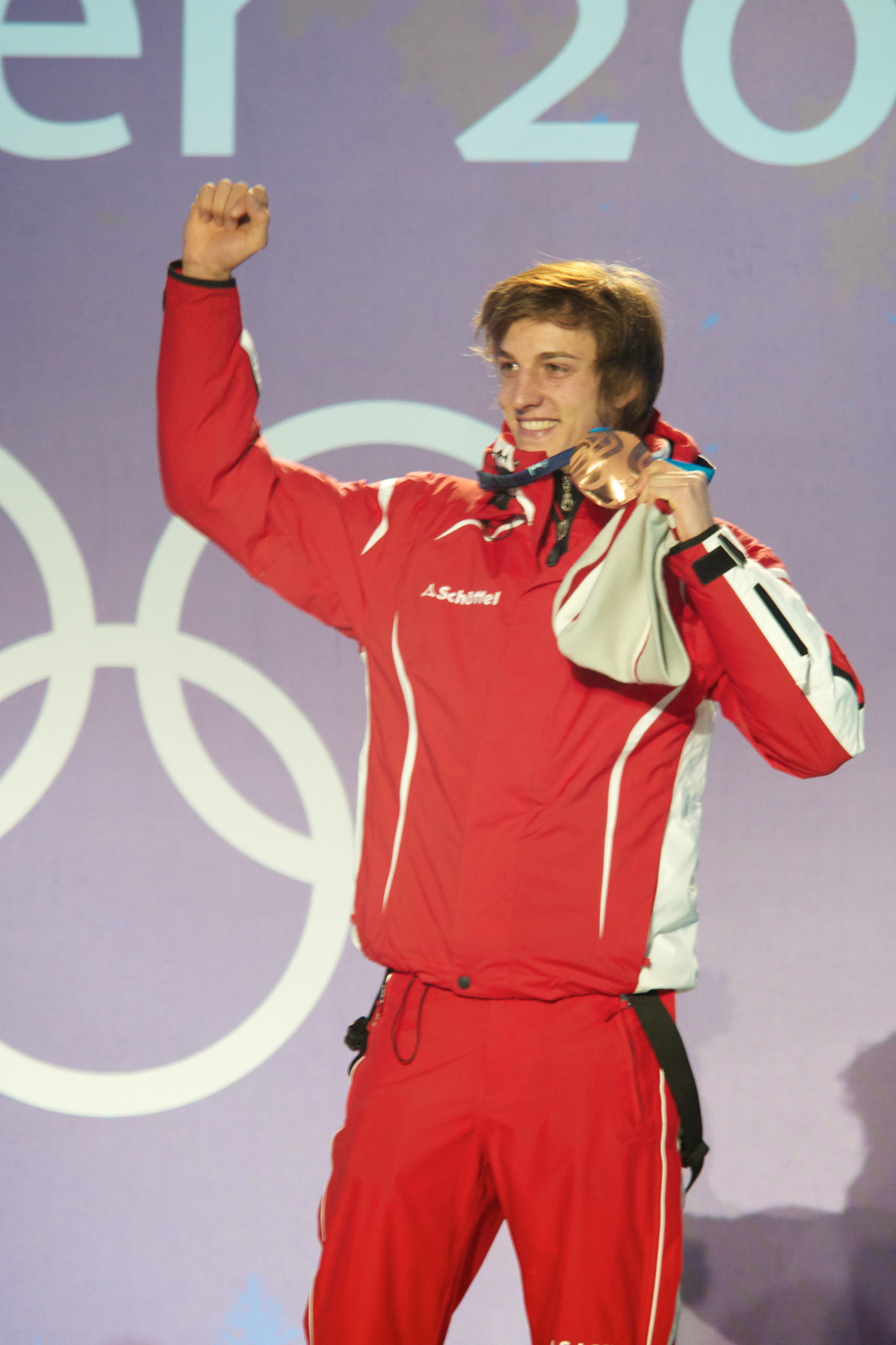
Schlierenzauer won three medals at the 2010 Winter Olympics.

In the 2009/10 World Cup, Schlierenzauer finished second behind Simon Ammann. He celebrated 8 World Cup victories including wins in Garmisch-Partenkirchen and Innsbruck during the Four Hills Tournament. One of the season highlights for Schlierenzauer was the 2010 Winter Olympics in Vancouver. He was only 7th after the first round in the Normal Hill competition, but jumping 106.5 meters in the final round, moved him up to 3rd position. The Normal Hill event was won by Simon Ammann while Adam Malysz was second. A week later, Schlierenzauer was 5th after the first round in the Large Hill competition, but moved to 3rd place again in the final round. The competition was once again won by Simon Ammann while Adam Malysz finished second.

Two days later he won the Team Event with Wolfgang Loitzl, Andreas Kofler and Thomas Morgenstern, earning Schlierenzauer his first ever Olympic gold medal.

At the Ski Flying World Championships in Planica, he was beaten only by Simon Ammann and won silver. With the team he won the gold medal again.

=== 2010/11 World Cup ===
At the beginning of the 2010/11 World Cup, Schlierenzauer suffered an injury and missed the first two events of the Four Hills Tournament. Even though he was recovering from injury, he managed to take two victories at the Vikersund ski flying hill and also set a new Personal Best in Vikersund by jumping 243.5 meters.

Later in the season, he won three gold medals at FIS Nordic World Ski Championships at Holmenkollen in Oslo. In the competition on the large hill, he won his first and only individual gold medal at the Nordic World Championships, only 0.3 points ahead of his teammate Thomas Morgenstern.

With a victory in Planica at the end of the season, he was able to win the ski flying classification for the second time.

=== 2011/12 World Cup ===
Schlierenzauer celebrated his first victory of the 2011/12 season in Harrachov on 9 December 2011. On 6 January 2012, Schlierenzauer won the Four Hills Tournament for the first time.

On 15 January 2012, at the second ski flying competition on the Kulm, Schlierenzauer's jump suit tore just before his jump and could not be repaired, but Schlierenzauer still jumped to victory with a superior jump, but was disqualified due to the suit. This disqualification ultimately cost him the overall World Cup.

As of 5 February 2012, Schlierenzauer has 40 World Cup victories, overtaking Adam Malysz. At the end of the season he finished second in the overall World Cup, behind Norwegian Anders Bardal.

=== 2012/13 World Cup ===
Schlierenzauer dominated the 2012/13 season, winning the Four Hills Tournament for the second time and the ski flying classification for the third time.

At the first Individual Competition in Vikersund, on 26 January 2013, Schlierenzauer equaled Nykänen's long-standing record of 46 World Cup wins, and at Harrachov, on 3 February, he superseded Nykänen's record by winning again.

At the Nordic Championships in Val di Fiemme, Schlierenzauer won gold with the team, silver with the mixed-team and also silver on the normal hill.

At the end of the season he won the overall World Cup by a wide margin and at that point already had 50 World Cup wins.

=== 2013/14 World Cup ===
The 2013/14 season initially went well for Schlierenzauer, and after not competing in Klingenthal he was able to win his first two competitions of the season in Kuusamo and Lillehammer. He finished 8th at the Four Hills Tournament and also took two podium finishes at the Kulm ski-flying events.

However, he could not build on his past dominance in the World Cup and so the Olympic Winter Games in Sochi were disappointing for him. He finished 11th on the normal hill and 7th on the large hill. With the team it was enough for a silver medal.

At the end of the season he finished 6th overall.

=== 2014/15 World Cup ===
The 2014/15 season was also difficult for Schlierenzauer. After poor performances at the beginning of the season, he managed to win the first competition in Lillehammer, it was his 53 and last World Cup victory. The next weekend he took second place in the first competition at Nizhny Tagil, his 88 and also last world cup podium.

In the Four Hills Tournament he finished 7th. As the season progressed, Schlierenzauer fought for his form and was able to win the silver medal on the large hill event at the Nordic World Ski Championships in Falun, he only had to admit defeat to the German Severin Freund. With the team it was also enough for a silver medal.

The 2014/15 season was Schlierenzauer's last at the top of the world.

=== 2015/16 to 2020/21 ===
After poor performances early in the 2015/16 season, Schlierenzauer took a break and returned to the Four Hills Tournament, but failed to impress there either, and ended the season as a result. In March 2016 he tore his cruciate ligament while skiing in Canada and had to postpone his comeback to 2017.

At the Nordic World Ski Championships 2017 in Lahti it was enough for Schlierenzauer to win a bronze medal with the team.

His best result of the season 2017/18 was 13th at Oberstdorf in the Four Hills Tournament. At the season Final in Planica, Schlierenzauer jumped 253.5 meters in the Qualification but touched the ground with his hands. It was the same length as Stefan Kraft's world record, however it did not count as he touched the ground with his hands. Schlierenzauer finished the season 35th overall with 77 points.

At the Winter Olympics in Pyeongchang, he finished 22nd on the normal hill. He was not set up on the large hill and missed a medal as fourth with the team.

Schlierenzauer disappointed in the season 2018/19 opener at Wisla, but was 12th in the difficult wind conditions at Kuusamo, a week later.

The 2019/20 season was his best since 2014/15. Schlierenzauer was able to achieve four top ten results, including a fourth place in Nizhny Tagil. In the end he finished 20th overall.

On 21 September 2021, he announced the end of his athletic career on his website.

== Olympic Games ==
Event	Normal Hill	Large Hill	Team
Representing Austria
(Canada) 2010 Vancouver	Bronze	Bronze	Gold
(Russia) 2014 Sochi	11th	7th	Silver
(South Korea) 2018 Pyeongchang	22nd	—	4th

== World Championships ==
Event	Normal Hill	Large Hill	Team Normal Hill	Team Large Hill	Mixed Team
Representing Austria
(Japan) 2007 Sapporo	8th	10th	N/A	Gold	N/A
(Czech Republic) 2009 Liberec	Silver	4th	N/A	Gold	N/A
(Norway) 2011 Oslo	8th	Gold	Gold	Gold	N/A
(Italy) 2013 Val di Fiemme	Silver	8th	N/A	Gold	Silver
(Sweden) 2015 Falun	22nd	Silver	N/A	Silver	—
(Finland) 2017 Lahti	24th	—	N/A	Bronze	—

== Ski Flying World Championships ==
Event	Individual	Team
Representing Austria
(Germany) 2008 Oberstdorf	Gold	Gold
(Slovenia) 2010 Planica	Silver	Gold
(Norway) 2012 Vikersund	18th	Gold
(Czech Republic) 2014 Harrachov	24th	—
(Slovenia) 2020 Planica	26th	6th

== World Cup ==
=== Standings ===
Season	Overall	4H	SF	RA	W6	T5	P7	NT
2005/06	73	—	N/A	N/A	N/A	N/A	N/A	50
2006/07	4	2nd place, silver medalist(s)	N/A	N/A	N/A	N/A	N/A	24
2007/08	2nd place, silver medalist(s)	12	N/A	N/A	N/A	N/A	N/A	1st place, gold medalist(s)
2008/09	1st place, gold medalist(s)	3rd place, bronze medalist(s)	1st place, gold medalist(s)	N/A	N/A	N/A	N/A	1st place, gold medalist(s)
2009/10	2nd place, silver medalist(s)	4	2nd place, silver medalist(s)	N/A	N/A	N/A	N/A	4
2010/11	9	36	1st place, gold medalist(s)	N/A	N/A	N/A	N/A	N/A
2011/12	2nd place, silver medalist(s)	1st place, gold medalist(s)	8	N/A	N/A	N/A	N/A	N/A
2012/13	1st place, gold medalist(s)	1st place, gold medalist(s)	1st place, gold medalist(s)	N/A	N/A	N/A	N/A	N/A
2013/14	6	8	3rd place, bronze medalist(s)	N/A	N/A	N/A	N/A	N/A
2014/15	10	7	18	N/A	N/A	N/A	N/A	N/A
2015/16	43	33	—	N/A	N/A	N/A	N/A	N/A
2016/17	34	—	34	28	N/A	N/A	N/A	N/A
2017/18	35	26	46	29	—	N/A	23	N/A
2018/19	46	—	—	—	47	N/A	—	N/A
2019/20	20	28	—	11	8	18	N/A	N/A
2020/21	65	60	—	N/A	—	N/A	—	N/A

=== Individual starts (275) ===
Season	1	2	3	4	5	6	7	8	9	10	11	12	13	14	15	16	17	18	19	20	21	22	23	24	25	26	27	28	29	30	31	Points
2005/06																																7
2005/06	–	–	–	–	–	–	–	–	–	–	–	–	–	–	–	–	–	–	–	24	–	–										7
2006/07																																956
2006/07	–	4	1	1	3	1	4	11	1	–	9	4	10	8	2	1	17	38	9	19	41	–	–	–								956
2007/08																																1561
2007/08	4	2	9	3	2	4	2	2	1	5	42	18	6	–	1	8	–	–	2	2	8	2	4	1	1	1	1					1561
2008/09																																2083
2008/09	3	1	3	2	4	3	1	4	4	2	4	1	1	2	1	1	1	1	1	1	8	1	10	3	1	1	5					2083
2009/10																																1368
2009/10	19	1	4	2	1	6	9	1	1	6	5	1	–	–	1	1	7	3	1	4	11	2	12									1368
2010/11																																761
2010/11	14	16	14	20	–	–	–	–	–	18	23	5	13	–	–	6	9	19	5	5	3	1	1	8	1	4						761
2011/12																																1267
2011/12	2	6	4	1	8	11	4	1	1	2	3	7	30	18	1	–	–	1	2	18	7	6	12	16	5	4						1267
2012/13																																1620
2012/13	8	1	4	1	25	3	1	2	2	1	1	DNS	8	–	–	1	3	1	1	3	3	15	5	16	1	1	11					1620
2013/14																																943
2013/14	DNS	1	1	15	4	8	27	4	9	8	4	18	3	2	8	12	–	–	–	–	18	8	3	10	13	5	5	8				943
2014/15																																739
2014/15	15	24	12	1	13	2	4	23	11	17	4	5	7	24	38	15	–	–	13	20	7	10	–	–	7	27	8	17	17	12	9	739
2015/16																																53
2015/16	17	14	20	–	–	–	–	31	21	33	–	–	–	–	–	–	–	–	–	–	–	–	–	–	–	–	–	–	–			53
2016/17																																94
2016/17	–	–	–	–	–	–	–	–	–	–	–	31	8	33	7	19	–	–	–	–	–	20	–	28	–	–						94
2017/18																																77
2017/18	–	–	–	–	22	46	34	13	19	37	33	38	40	–	–	19	17	25	q	38	27	–										77
2018/19	Wisła	Kuusamo	Kuusamo	Nizhny Tagil	Nizhny Tagil	Engelberg	Engelberg	Oberstdorf	Garmisch-Partenkirchen	Innsbruck	Bischofshofen	Val di Fiemme	Val di Fiemme	Zakopane	Sapporo	Sapporo	Oberstdorf	Oberstdorf	Oberstdorf	Lahti	Willingen	Willingen	Oslo	Lillehammer	Trondheim	Vikersund	Planica	Planica				23
2018/19	48	12	q	34	45	–	–	–	–	–	–	–	–	–	–	–	–	–	–	30	42	DQ	–	–	–	–	–	–				23
2019/20	Wisła	Kuusamo	Nizhny Tagil	Nizhny Tagil	Klingenthal	Engelberg	Engelberg	Oberstdorf	Garmisch-Partenkirchen	Innsbruck	Bischofshofen	Val di Fiemme	Val di Fiemme	Titisee-Neustadt	Titisee-Neustadt	Zakopane	Sapporo	Sapporo	Willingen	Tauplitz	Tauplitz	Râșnov	Râșnov	Lahti	Lahti	Oslo	Lillehammer					356
2019/20	30	14	4	44	12	37	15	31	35	6	17	20	17	15	14	32	33	37	7	40	q	17	12	26	13	10	18					356
2020/21	Wisła	Ruka	Ruka	Nizhny Tagil	Nizhny Tagil	Engelberg	Engelberg	Oberstdorf	Garmisch-Partenkirchen	Innsbruck	Bischofshofen	Titisee-Neustadt	Titisee-Neustadt	Zakopane	Lahti	Willingen	Willingen	Klingenthal	Klingenthal	Szczyrk	Szczyrk	Râșnov	Planica	Planica	Planica							8
2020/21	44	–	–	–	–	30	24	–	–	32	DQ	–	–	38	–	–	–	–	–	–	–	–	–	–	–							8

=== Podiums ===
Season	Podiums			
Season	Medals			Total
Season	1st place, gold medalist(s)	2nd place, silver medalist(s)	3rd place, bronze medalist(s)	
2006/07	5	1	1	7
2007/08	6	7	1	14
2008/09	13	3	4	20
2009/10	8	2	1	11
2010/11	3	-	1	4
2011/12	5	3	1	9
2012/13	10	2	4	16
2013/14	2	1	2	5
2014/15	1	1	-	2
Total	53	20	15	88

=== Wins ===
No.	Season	Date	Location	Hill	Size
1	2006/07	3 December 2006	(Norway) Lillehammer	Lysgårdsbakken HS138	LH
2	2006/07	16 December 2006	(Switzerland) Engelberg	Gross-Titlis-Schanze HS137	LH
3	2006/07	30 December 2006	(Germany) Oberstdorf	Schattenbergschanze HS137 (night)	LH
4	2006/07	7 January 2007	(Austria) Bischofshofen	Paul-Ausserleitner-Schanze HS140 (night)	LH
5	2006/07	7 February 2007	(Germany) Klingenthal	Vogtland Arena HS140 (night)	LH
6	2007/08	1 January 2008	(Germany) Garmisch-Partenkirchen	Große Olympiaschanze HS140	LH
7	2007/08	25 January 2008	(Poland) Zakopane	Wielka Krokiew HS134 (night)	LH
8	2007/08	7 March 2008	(Norway) Lillehammer	Lysgårdsbakken HS138 (night)	LH
9	2007/08	9 March 2008	(Norway) Oslo	Holmenkollbakken HS128	LH
10	2007/08	14 March 2008	(Slovenia) Planica	Letalnica bratov Gorišek HS215	FH
11	2007/08	16 March 2008	(Slovenia) Planica	Letalnica bratov Gorišek HS215	FH
12	2008/09	6 December 2008	(Norway) Trondheim	Granåsen HS140 (night)	LH
13	2008/09	21 December 2008	(Switzerland) Engelberg	Gross-Titlis-Schanze HS137	LH
14	2008/09	10 January 2009	(Austria) Tauplitz/Bad Mitterndorf	Kulm HS200	FH
15	2008/09	11 January 2009	(Austria) Tauplitz/Bad Mitterndorf	Kulm HS200	FH
16	2008/09	17 January 2009	(Poland) Zakopane	Wielka Krokiew HS134 (night)	LH
17	2008/09	24 January 2009	(Canada) Whistler	Whistler Olympic Park HS140	LH
18	2008/09	25 January 2009	(Canada) Whistler	Whistler Olympic Park HS140	LH
19	2008/09	31 January 2009	(Japan) Sapporo	Okurayama HS134 (night)	LH
20	2008/09	8 February 2009	(Germany) Willingen	Mühlenkopfschanze HS145 (night)	LH
21	2008/09	11 February 2009	(Germany) Klingenthal	Vogtland Arena HS140 (night)	LH
22	2008/09	8 March 2009	(Finland) Lahti	Salpausselkä HS97	NH
23	2008/09	15 March 2009	(Norway) Vikersund	Vikersundbakken HS207 (night)	FH
24	2008/09	20 March 2009	(Slovenia) Planica	Letalnica bratov Gorišek HS215	FH
25	2009/10	5 December 2009	(Norway) Lillehammer	Lysgårdsbakken HS138 (night)	LH
26	2009/10	19 December 2009	(Switzerland) Engelberg	Gross-Titlis-Schanze HS137	LH
27	2009/10	1 January 2010	(Germany) Garmisch-Partenkirchen	Große Olympiaschanze HS140	LH
28	2009/10	3 January 2010	(Austria) Innsbruck	Bergiselschanze HS130	LH
29	2009/10	10 January 2010	(Austria) Tauplitz/Bad Mitterndorf	Kulm HS200	FH
30	2009/10	22 January 2010	(Poland) Zakopane	Wielka Krokiew HS134 (night)	LH
31	2009/10	23 January 2010	(Poland) Zakopane	Wielka Krokiew HS134 (night)	LH
32	2009/10	6 February 2010	(Germany) Willingen	Mühlenkopfschanze HS145 (night)	LH
33	2010/11	12 February 2011	(Norway) Vikersund	Vikersundbakken HS225 (night)	FH
34	2010/11	13 February 2011	(Norway) Vikersund	Vikersundbakken HS225	FH
35	2010/11	18 March 2011	(Slovenia) Planica	Letalnica bratov Gorišek HS215	FH
36	2011/12	9 December 2011	(Czech Republic) Harrachov	Čerťák HS142 (night)	LH
37	2011/12	30 December 2011	(Germany) Oberstdorf	Schattenbergschanze HS137 (night)	LH
38	2011/12	1 January 2012	(Germany) Garmisch-Partenkirchen	Große Olympiaschanze HS140	LH
39	2011/12	21 January 2012	(Poland) Zakopane	Wielka Krokiew HS134 (night)	LH
40	2011/12	4 February 2012	(Italy) Val di Fiemme	Trampolino dal Ben HS134 (night)	LH
41	2012/13	25 November 2012	(Norway) Lillehammer	Lysgårdsbakken HS138	LH
42	2012/13	8 December 2012	(Russia) Soči	RusSki Gorki HS106 (night)	NH
43	2012/13	16 December 2012	(Switzerland) Engelberg	Gross-Titlis-Schanze HS137	LH
44	2012/13	4 January 2013	(Austria) Innsbruck	Bergiselschanze HS130	LH
45	2012/13	6 January 2013	(Austria) Bischofshofen	Paul-Ausserleitner-Schanze HS140 (night)	LH
46	2012/13	26 January 2013	(Norway) Vikersund	Vikersundbakken HS225	FH
47	2012/13	3 February 2013	(Czech Republic) Harrachov	Čerťák HS205	FH
48	2012/13	3 February 2013	(Czech Republic) Harrachov	Čerťák HS205	FH
49	2012/13	17 March 2013	(Norway) Oslo	Holmenkollbakken HS128	LH
50	2012/13	22 March 2013	(Slovenia) Planica	Letalnica bratov Gorišek HS215	FH
51	2013/14	29 November 2013	(Finland) Kuusamo	Rukatunturi HS142 (night)	LH
52	2013/14	7 December 2013	(Norway) Lillehammer	Lysgårdsbakken HS100 (night)	NH
53	2014/15	6 December 2014	(Norway) Lillehammer	Lysgårdsbakken HS138 (night)	LH

== Records ==
=== Current records ===
Gregor Schlierenzauer set numerous records during his active career. On January 26, 2013, he became the record World Cup winner with his 46th World Cup victory, together with Matti Nykänen. On February 3, 2013, he achieved his 47th World Cup victory and has been the sole record World Cup winner since then. Schlierenzauer achieved a total of 53 World Cup victories.

Schlierenzauer also achieved the most team victories in the World Cup, with a total of 17 victories with Austria. Adding together individual and team victories, he achieved 70 World Cup victories, another record.

Other records include his total of 14 World Cup victories in ski flying and his 36 World Cup victories on large hills. At 18, he is also the youngest ski flying world champion.

He shares the record for most ski flying crystal globes (three) with Peter Prevc and Stefan Kraft.

Together with Janne Ahonen, Matti Hautamäki, Thomas Morgenstern, Ryōyū Kobayashi and Domen Prevc, he holds the longest winning streak in the World Cup with six victories in a row.

In the 2012/13 season, he scored 544 points in the ski flying ranking, a record that still stands today.

Together with Johan Remen Evensen, Schlierenzauer achieved the highest score in a single ski jumping competition (with a maximum of two rounds) when they both scored 498.6 points at the first ski flying competition in Vikersund in 2011.

He is, with Stefan Kraft, the only ski jumper to win at least one medal at six consecutive Nordic World Ski Championships (2007–2017).

=== Former records ===
From 2009 to 2016, Schlierenzauer held the record for most World Cup victories (13), most podium finishes (20) and most points (2083) in a season.

Until 2023, his 19 podium finishes in ski flying competitions and 36 podium finishes in team competitions were also a record.

From 2015 to 2022, he shared the record for most victories (13) in the Summer Grand Prix with Adam Małysz.

In 2008, Schlierenzauer set a new Austrian ski flying national record of 232.5 meters, which he was able to improve to 233.5 meters shortly afterwards. In 2011, he set another new national record of 243.5 meters.

== Invalid ski jumping world record ==
Date	Hill	Location	Metres	Feet
22 March 2018	Letalnica bratov Gorišek HS240	Planica, Slovenia	253.5	832

Not recognized. Ground touch at world record distance.
