= Pascal Bodmer =

German ski jumper (born 1991)

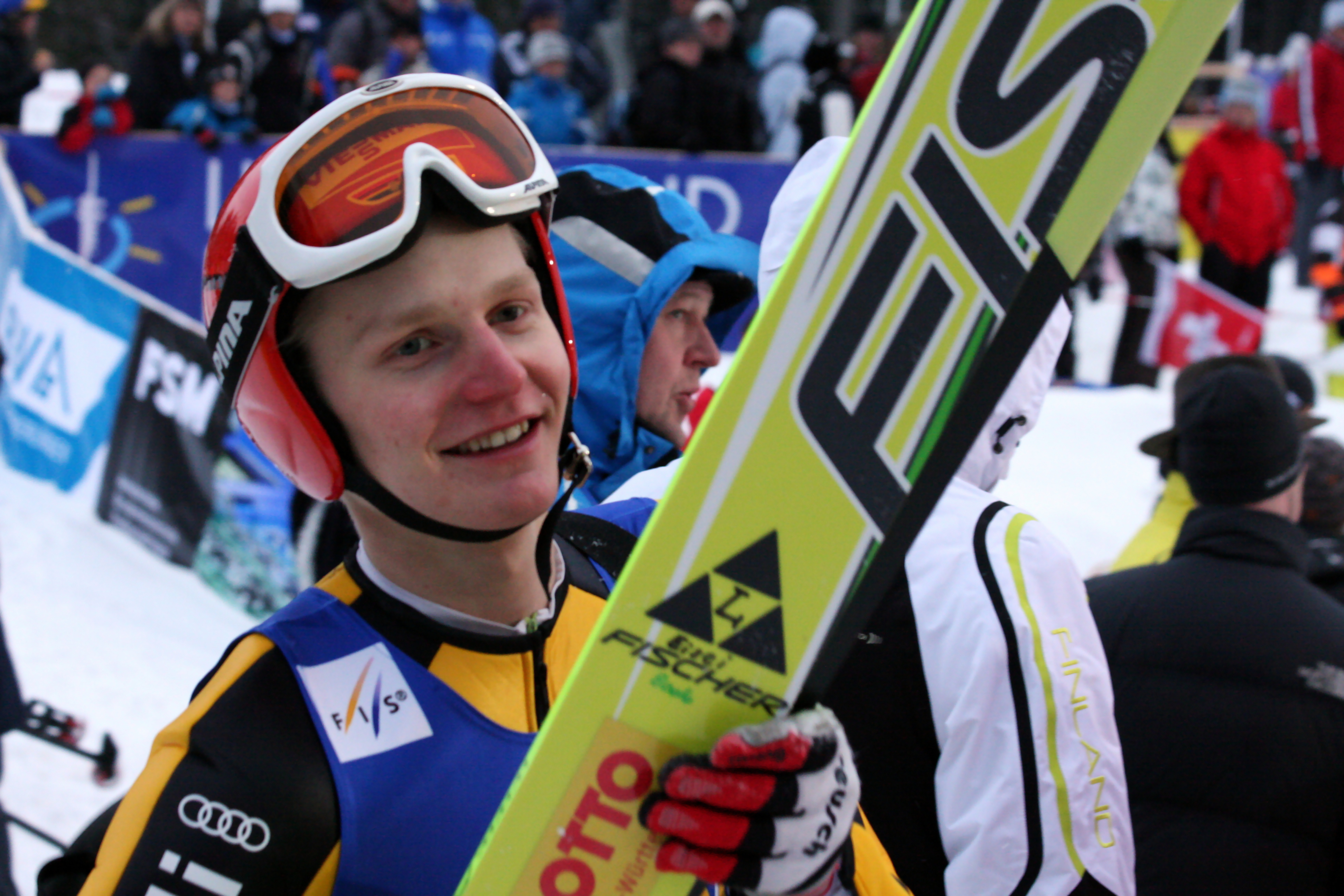

Personal information
- Nickname: Bodo
- Born: 4 January 1991 (age 35) Balingen, Germany

Sport
- Sport: Skiing
- Club: SV Meßstetten

World Cup career
- Seasons: 2007-present
- Indiv. podiums: 1
- Indiv. wins: 0
- Updated on 28 November 2009

Pascal Bodmer (born 4 January 1991) is a German ski jumper who has competed since 2004. He finished 31st in the individual normal hill event at the 2010 Winter Olympics in Vancouver.

Having made his Continental Cup debut in July 2006, his best result is the victory from Velenje in July 2008. He won a gold medal in the team competition at the 2008 Junior World Ski Championships. He made his World Cup debut in February 2007 in Titisee-Neustadt, and collected his first World Cup points with a 29th place in Klingenthal in February 2007.

He was born in Balingen, but hails from Hossingen. His brother Patrick competed in the Continental Cup. In 2011, in a ski flying training in Planica he lost control in flight and crashed badly into the hill. He injured his left shoulder, but he is said to be alright in May 2011.
