= Andreas Kofler =

Austrian ski jumper (born 1984)

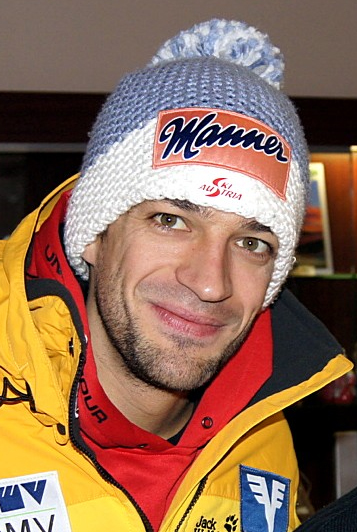
- Kofler in 2011

Personal information
- Nationality: Austria
- Born: 17 May 1984 (age 42) Innsbruck, Austria
- Height: 1.80 m (5 ft 11 in)

Sport
- Sport: Skiing
- Club: SV Innsbruck Bergisel

World Cup career
- Seasons: 2003–2017; 2019
- Indiv. starts: 309
- Indiv. podiums: 36
- Indiv. wins: 12
- Team starts: 32
- Team podiums: 25
- Team wins: 15
- Four Hills titles: 1 (2010)

Achievements and titles
- Personal bests: 233 m (764 ft); Vikersund, 26 February 2012
Medal record
Men's ski jumping
Olympic Games
Silver medal – second place	2006 Turin	Individual LH
Gold medal – first place	2006 Turin	Team LH
Gold medal – first place	2010 Vancouver	Team LH
FIS Nordic World Ski Championships
Gold medal – first place	2007 Sapporo	Team LH
Gold medal – first place	2011 Oslo	Team NH
Gold medal – first place	2011 Oslo	Team LH
Silver medal – second place	2011 Oslo	Individual NH
Men's ski flying
FIS Ski Flying World Championships
Gold medal – first place	2008 Oberstdorf	Team
Gold medal – first place	2012 Vikersund	Team
- Updated on 7 May 2019

Andreas Kofler (born 17 May 1984) is an Austrian former ski jumper.

== Career ==
Andreas Kofler grew up in Tyrol, in the Austrian Alps. He is a member of the ski jumping club SV Innsbruck-Bergisel, together with Gregor Schlierenzauer.

Kofler won his first individual competition in the World Cup on 4 February 2006. Two days later, he came in second place in the team competition. At the 2006 Winter Olympics in Turin, Italy, Kofler won the silver medal in the individual competition, finishing only 0.1 points behind Thomas Morgenstern, his teammate on the squad with whom he would later win the Olympic gold medal in the team competition. At the Nordic Ski World Championships 2007 in Sapporo, Japan, Kofler won the gold medal in the team competition and finished in sixth place in the individual competition. At the end of the season, he arrived in second place at the Nordic Tournament, beaten only by Adam Małysz.

After starting well into the 2007/08 season, finishing in second place behind Morgenstern twice, Kofler crashed twice during competitions, in Engelberg and in Oberstdorf. Despite not being seriously injured, Kofler struggled to shake off his poor form for this and the next season.

In the 2009–2010, Kofler came in third place in Engelberg, ending his bad streak. During the same season, Kofler managed to win the prestigious Four Hills Tournament, ahead of Janne Ahonen and Wolfgang Loitzl, after winning the first event of the tournament in Oberstdorf. Kofler could not meet expectations in the first event (on the normal hill) of the 2010 Winter Olympics in Vancouver, coming in 19th place. Nonetheless, he finished in fourth place on the large hill, only one point from the podium, and won the team competition with his teammates Wolfgang Loitzl, Thomas Morgenstern and Gregor Schlierenzauer—his second Olympic gold medal after 2006.

During the 2010/11 season, Kofler recorded three individual wins, including the first event of the season in Kuusamo, Finland.

Despite a training deficit due to back problems related to his spinal discs, Kofler started the 2011/12 season by winning the first two events, which took place in Lillehammer, Norway.

== World Cup ==
=== Standings ===
Season	Overall	4H	SF	RA	W5	NT
2002/03	16	4	N/A	N/A	N/A	40
2003/04	21	30	N/A	N/A	N/A	29
2004/05	40	50	N/A	N/A	N/A	34
2005/06	7	8	N/A	N/A	N/A	4
2006/07	7	12	N/A	N/A	N/A	2nd place, silver medalist(s)
2007/08	13	30	N/A	N/A	N/A	7
2008/09	36	28	42	N/A	N/A	26
2009/10	4	1st place, gold medalist(s)	12	N/A	N/A	6
2010/11	4	8	21	N/A	N/A	N/A
2011/12	3rd place, bronze medalist(s)	3rd place, bronze medalist(s)	12	N/A	N/A	N/A
2012/13	17	15	—	N/A	N/A	N/A
2013/14	12	25	—	N/A	N/A	N/A
2014/15	29	23	—	N/A	N/A	N/A
2015/16	38	48	—	N/A	N/A	N/A
2016/17	23	17	—	50	N/A	N/A
2018/19	—	—	—	—	—	N/A

=== Wins ===
No.	Season	Date	Location	Hill	Size
1	2005/06	4 February 2006	(Germany) Willingen	Mühlenkopfschanze HS145	LH
2	2009/10	29 December 2009	(Germany) Oberstdorf	Schattenbergschanze HS137 (night)	LH
3	2010/11	28 November 2010	(Finland) Kuusamo	Rukatunturi HS142	LH
4	2010/11	19 December 2010	(Switzerland) Engelberg	Gross-Titlis-Schanze HS137	LH
5	2010/11	16 January 2011	(Japan) Sapporo	Ōkurayama HS134	LH
6	2011/12	27 November 2011	(Finland) Kuusamo	Rukatunturi HS142 (night)	LH
7	2011/12	3 December 2011	(Norway) Lillehammer	Lysgårdsbakken HS100 (night)	NH
8	2011/12	4 December 2011	(Norway) Lillehammer	Lysgårdsbakken HS138	LH
9	2011/12	18 December 2011	(Switzerland) Engelberg	Gross-Titlis-Schanze HS137	LH
10	2011/12	4 January 2012	(Austria) Innsbruck	Bergiselschanze HS130	LH
11	2012/13	9 December 2012	(Russia) Sochi	RusSki Gorki HS106	NH
12	2012/13	15 December 2012	(Switzerland) Engelberg	Gross-Titlis-Schanze HS137	LH

== Personal life ==
In 2007, Andreas Kofler started a four-year formation to become a member of the Austrian police force, as part of a program for competitive athletes. In May 2011, Kofler passed his final examinations and hence concluded his formation. His hobbies include telemark skiing, football, surfing and climbing. Andreas Kofler currently resides in Thaur, Tyrol.
