= David Zauner =

Austrian ski jumper and Nordic combined skier

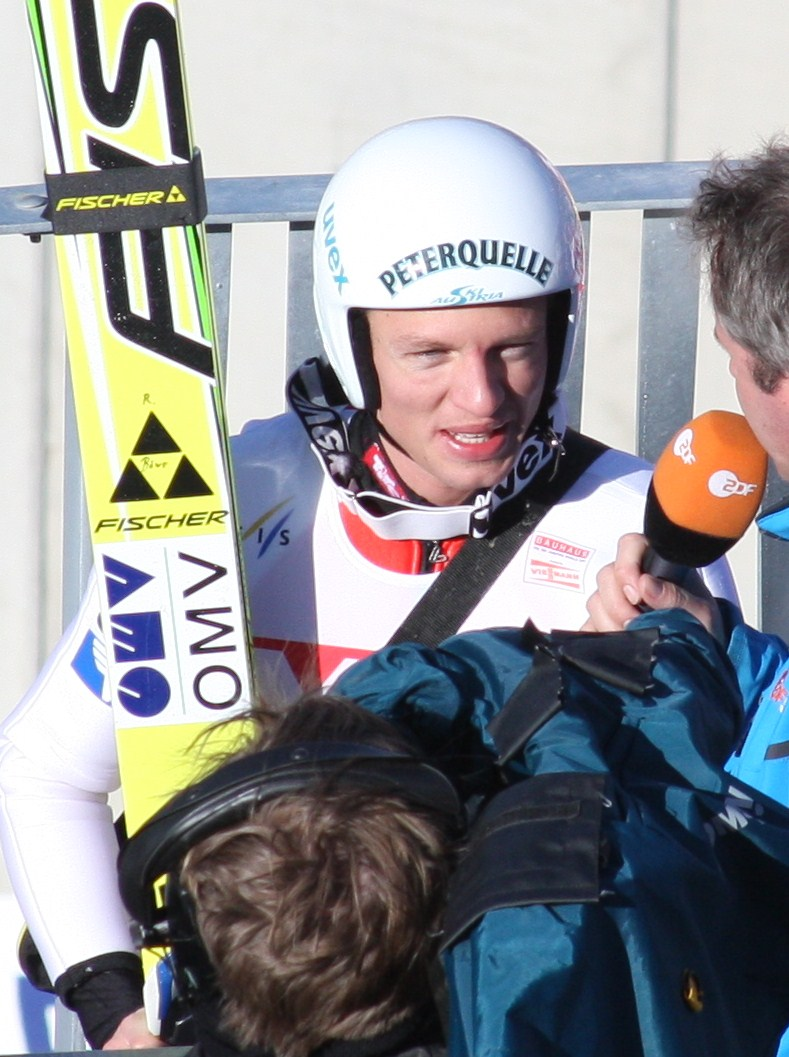

Personal information
- Born: 9 April 1985 (age 41)
- Website: http://www.david-zauner.at/

Sport
- Country: Austria
- Sport: ski jumping; Nordic combined

David Zauner (born 9 April 1985) is an Austrian ski jumper and former Nordic combined skier.

He made his Ski jumping Continental Cup debut in July 2009 in Villach with an eighth place. He also recorded a fifth and sixth place in Wisła and a ninth place in Rovaniemi in the same season. He made his World Cup debut in January 2010 in Sapporo, collecting his first World Cup points with a ninth place.
