= Wolfgang Loitzl =

Austrian ski jumper (born 1980)

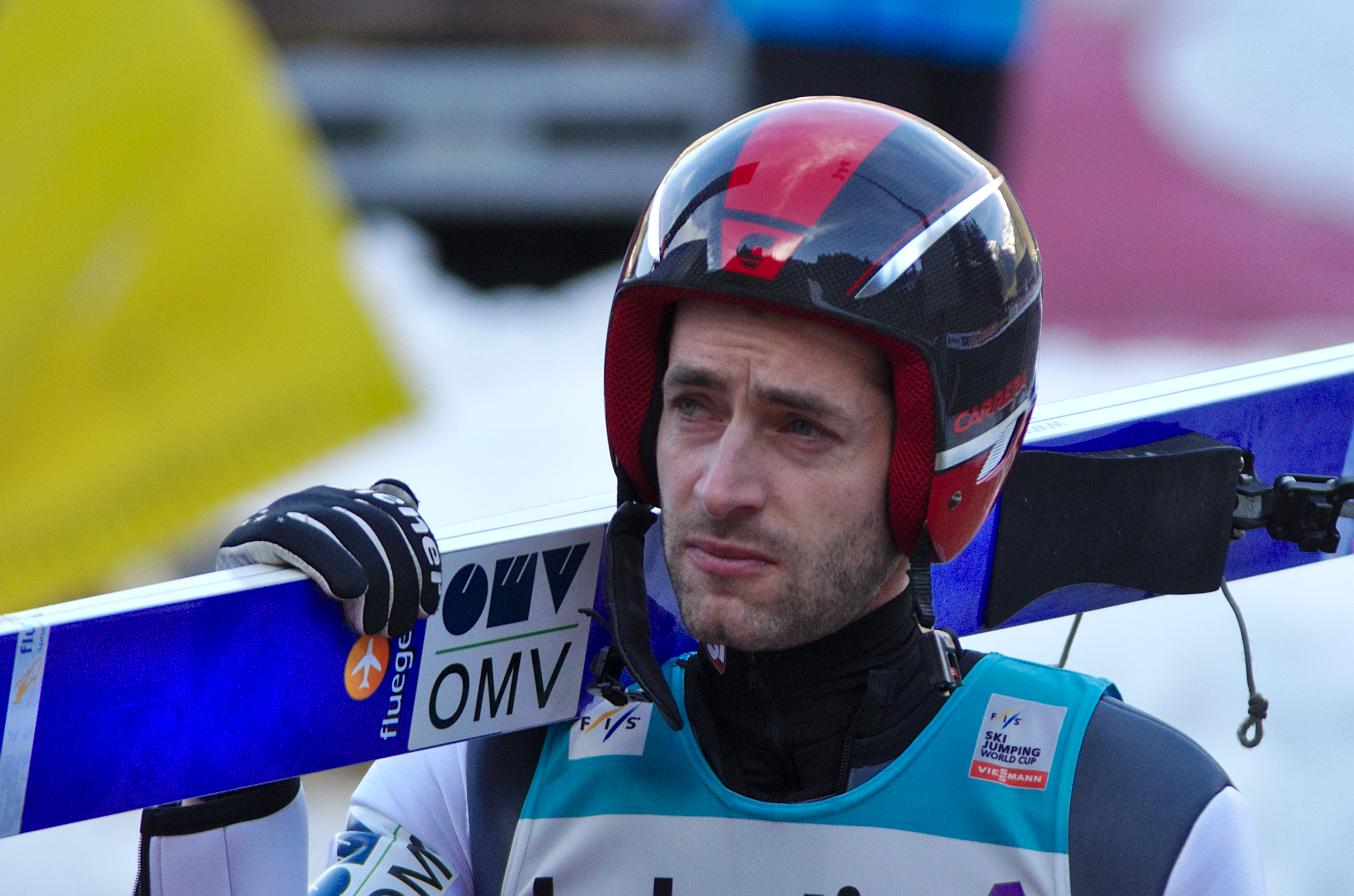
- Loitzl in Engelberg, 2014

Personal information
- Nationality: Austria
- Born: 13 January 1980 (age 46) Bad Ischl, Austria
- Height: 1.80 m (5 ft 11 in)

Sport
- Sport: Skiing

World Cup career
- Seasons: 1997–2015
- Indiv. starts: 356
- Indiv. podiums: 20
- Indiv. wins: 4
- Team starts: 34
- Team podiums: 27
- Team wins: 10
- Four Hills titles: 1 (2009)

Achievements and titles
- Personal bests: 213.5 m (700 ft); Planica, 20 March 2010
Medal record
Men's ski jumping
Event	1st	2nd	3rd
Olympic Games	1	0	0
World Championships	7	0	1
Ski Flying World Championships	1	0	1
Total	9	4	2
Olympic Games
Gold medal – first place	2010 Vancouver	Team LH
FIS Nordic World Ski Championships
Gold medal – first place	2001 Lahti	Team NH
Gold medal – first place	2005 Oberstdorf	Team NH
Gold medal – first place	2005 Oberstdorf	Team LH
Gold medal – first place	2007 Sapporo	Team LH
Gold medal – first place	2009 Liberec	Individual NH
Gold medal – first place	2009 Liberec	Team LH
Gold medal – first place	2013 Val di Fiemme	Team LH
Bronze medal – third place	2001 Lahti	Team LH
Men's ski flying
FIS Ski Flying World Championships
Gold medal – first place	2010 Planica	Team
Bronze medal – third place	2004 Planica	Team
- Updated on 10 February 2016

Wolfgang Loitzl (born 13 January 1980) is an Austrian former ski jumper. He was the winner of the 2008–09 Four Hills Tournament and the 2009 Normal Hill World Champion.

== Career ==
He won seven medals at the FIS Nordic World Ski Championships with seven golds (Individual normal hill: 2009, Team normal hill: 2001, 2005; Team large hill: 2005, 2007, 2009, 2013) and one bronze (Team large hill: 2001). He earned a bronze medal in the team event at the FIS Ski-Flying World Championships 2004 and finished 15th at the individual competition at those same championships. Loitzl has seven individual career victories from 1998 to 2003.

Loitzl won the 2008–09 Four Hills Tournament. In the final competition of the tournament in Bischofshofen, he received the maximum score (20) for the first jump from all five judges. In ski jumping history, only Anton Innauer (1976), Kazuyoshi Funaki (1998), Sven Hannawald (2003), Hideharu Miyahira (2003), and Peter Prevc (2015) have matched this feat.

On 21 February 2009 Loitzl won the individual gold on the normal hill at the World Championships at Liberec ahead of fellow Austrian Gregor Schlierenzauer and Switzerland's Simon Ammann. Further success followed on 28 February the same year when Loitzl won gold as part of the Austrian quartet in the team large hill event.

The following season, Loitzl won gold in the large hill team event at the 2010 Winter Olympics. He also won gold in the ski flying team event at the 2010 Ski Flying World Championships.

His son Benjamin was born on 12 January 2005, his second child Nikolas was born on 10 February 2007. He has been married to Marika since 11 June 2006.

== Olympic Games ==
Event	Normal Hill	Large Hill	Team
Representing Austria
(United States) 2002 Salt Lake City	—	—	4th
(Canada) 2010 Vancouver	11th	10th	Gold

== World Championships ==
Representing Austria
(Finland) 2001 Lahti	13th	15th	Gold	Bronze
(Germany) 2005 Oberstdorf	6th	7th	Gold	Gold
(Japan) 2007 Sapporo	12th	—	N/A	Gold
(Czech Republic) 2009 Liberec	Gold	6th	N/A	Gold
(Norway) 2011 Oslo	37th	—	—	—
(Italy) 2013 Val di Fiemme	17th	4th	—	Gold

== Ski Flying World Championships ==
Event	Individual	Team
Representing Austria
(Norway) 2000 Vikersund	17th	N/A
(Slovenia) 2004 Planica	15th	Bronze
(Slovenia) 2010 Planica	6th	Gold

== World Cup ==
=== Standings ===
Season	Overall	4H	SF	NT	JP
1996/97	—	71	—	—	—
1997/98	31	31	—	25	28
1998/99	12	16	14	8	12
1999/00	22	21	20	21	25
2000/01	7	9	19	9	N/A
2001/02	29	36	N/A	34	N/A
2002/03	60	46	N/A	—	N/A
2003/04	28	35	N/A	13	N/A
2004/05	18	13	N/A	16	N/A
2005/06	29	22	N/A	—	N/A
2006/07	13	16	N/A	6	N/A
2007/08	10	16	N/A	16	N/A
2008/09	3rd place, bronze medalist(s)	1st place, gold medalist(s)	12	7	N/A
2009/10	6	3rd place, bronze medalist(s)	9	7	N/A
2010/11	13	9	12	N/A	N/A
2011/12	30	31	25	N/A	N/A
2012/13	12	17	11	N/A	N/A
2013/14	29	15	12	N/A	N/A
2014/15	79	—	—	N/A	N/A

=== Wins ===
No.	Season	Date	Location	Hill	Size
1	2008/09	1 January 2009	(Germany) Garmisch-Partenkirchen	Große Olympiaschanze HS140	LH
2	2008/09	4 January 2009	(Austria) Innsbruck	Bergiselschanze HS130	LH
3	2008/09	6 January 2009	(Austria) Bischofshofen	Paul-Ausserleitner-Schanze HS140 (night)	LH
4	2008/09	16 January 2009	(Poland) Zakopane	Wielka Krokiew HS134 (night)	LH
