= Simon Ammann =

Swiss ski jumper (born 1981)

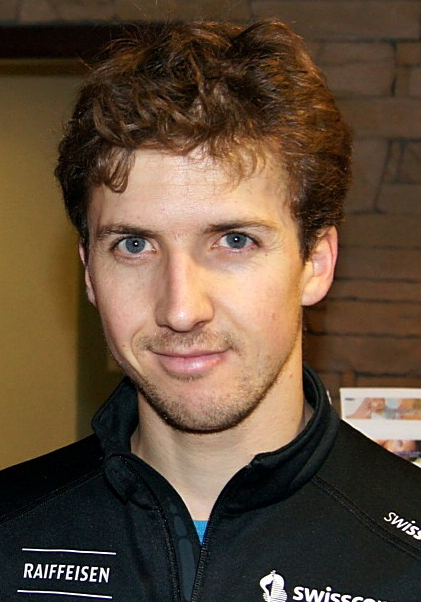
- Ammann in 2011

Personal information
- Born: 25 June 1981 (age 45) Grabs, Switzerland
- Height: 1.73 m (5 ft 8 in)

Sport
- Sport: Ski jumping
- Club: SSC Toggenburg

World Cup career
- Seasons: 1998–present
- Indiv. starts: 533
- Indiv. podiums: 80
- Indiv. wins: 23
- Team starts: 54
- Overall titles: 1 (2010)
- Nordic titles: 1 (2010)

Achievements and titles
- Personal bests: 239.5 m (786 ft); Vikersund, 2017
Medal record
Representing Switzerland
Men's ski jumping
Event	1st	2nd	3rd
Olympic Games	4	0	0
World Championships	1	1	2
Ski Flying World Championships	1	0	0
Total	6	1	2
Olympic Games
Gold medal – first place	2002 Salt Lake City	Individual NH
Gold medal – first place	2002 Salt Lake City	Individual LH
Gold medal – first place	2010 Vancouver	Individual NH
Gold medal – first place	2010 Vancouver	Individual LH
World Championships
Gold medal – first place	2007 Sapporo	Individual LH
Silver medal – second place	2007 Sapporo	Individual NH
Bronze medal – third place	2009 Liberec	Individual NH
Bronze medal – third place	2011 Oslo	Individual LH
Men's ski flying
World Championships
Gold medal – first place	2010 Planica	Individual
- Updated on 15 March 2026

Simon Ammann (/ˈsiːmɒn/; born 25 June 1981) is a Swiss ski jumper. He is one of the most successful athletes in the history of the sport, having won four individual Winter Olympic gold medals in 2002 and 2010. His other achievements include winning the 2007 Ski Jumping World Championships, the 2010 Ski Flying World Championships, the 2010 Nordic Tournament, and the 2010 Ski Jumping World Cup overall title.

== Career ==
Ammann made his debut at the age of 16 during the 1997–98 FIS Ski Jumping World Cup season. He qualified for the 1998 Olympic Games in Nagano, Japan, where he placed 35th.

Before the 2002 Winter Olympics in Salt Lake City, Ammann crashed and suffered injuries during training in Willingen. Despite this, he won a gold medal in both the individual normal hill and large hill competitions, being only the second athlete to accomplish this feat (Matti Nykänen having done so in 1988). During the Olympics, Ammann gained international attention not only for his victories but also for his youthful and bespectacled appearance on the podium that many compared to Harry Potter. In addition to acquiring Swiss stardom he also made appearances on American talk shows, such as the Late Show with David Letterman (on 20 February 2002).

Ammann also won the ski jumping event at the Holmenkollen Ski Festival in 2002 and 2007. This earned him the Holmenkollen medal in 2007 (shared with Frode Estil, Odd-Bjørn Hjelmeset, King Harald V, and Queen Sonja of Norway).

He made his third Olympic appearance in 2006 in Turin, Italy.

On 24 February 2007, he won his first medal at the FIS Nordic World Ski Championships with a victory in the individual large hill in Sapporo, Japan. Ammann would follow this with a silver medal in the individual normal hill the following week. Ammann would complete his set of medals with a bronze medal in the individual normal hill event at the FIS Nordic World Ski Championships 2009 in Liberec, Czech Republic.

In 2010, competing in his fourth Olympics in Vancouver, Canada, Ammann won the gold medal in the individual normal hill event, becoming the first athlete in Olympic history to win gold medals in the individual normal hill event at two Olympic Games. He also won a gold medal in the individual large hill event, thus becoming the first athlete to win gold medals in both individual ski jumping events at two Olympic Games, as well as the most decorated Swiss Olympic athlete of all time.

In March 2010, Ammann became the overall winner of the 2009–10 FIS Ski Jumping World Cup, winning all four events at the Nordic Tournament and nine World Cup events in one season overall. He finished the season by becoming the ski flying World Champion in Planica. His 236.5 metres (776 ft) fourth round jump was the longest jump of the event, and also the second longest jump in history at the time.

At the 2014 Winter Olympics in Sochi, Russia, he was selected as flag-bearer for the Switzerland Winter Olympics team.

On 6 January 2015, Ammann was injured on his second-round jump in Bischofshofen during the final stage of the 2014–15 Four Hills Tournament. His representation has since stated that his condition is stable, with most of the damage being on his face.

Ammann also competed in the 2018 and 2022 Winter Olympics, with his best finish being eleventh place in the normal hill event in 2018.

In February 2024, in Lake Placid, he made his 500th individual start in the World Cup.

== World Cup results ==
=== Standings ===
Season	Overall	4H	SF	RA	NT	JP
1997–98	70	48	—	N/A	—	67
1998–99	—	63	—	N/A	—	—
1999–00	45	70	—	N/A	—	45
2000–01	—	—	—	N/A	—	N/A
2001–02	7	6	N/A	N/A	4	N/A
2002–03	28	24	N/A	N/A	13	N/A
2003–04	13	14	N/A	N/A	3rd place, bronze medalist(s)	N/A
2004–05	23	37	N/A	N/A	27	N/A
2005–06	17	13	N/A	N/A	21	N/A
2006–07	3rd place, bronze medalist(s)	3rd place, bronze medalist(s)	N/A	N/A	3rd place, bronze medalist(s)	N/A
2007–08	9	15	N/A	N/A	20	N/A
2008–09	2nd place, silver medalist(s)	2nd place, silver medalist(s)	3rd place, bronze medalist(s)	N/A	3rd place, bronze medalist(s)	N/A
2009–10	1st place, gold medalist(s)	5	3rd place, bronze medalist(s)	N/A	1st place, gold medalist(s)	N/A
2010–11	2nd place, silver medalist(s)	2nd place, silver medalist(s)	5	N/A	N/A	N/A
2011–12	11	19	3rd place, bronze medalist(s)	N/A	N/A	N/A
2012–13	14	27	10	N/A	N/A	N/A
2013–14	7	3rd place, bronze medalist(s)	4	N/A	N/A	N/A
2014–15	11	17	—	N/A	N/A	N/A
2015–16	15	11	15	N/A	N/A	N/A
2016–17	29	44	24	11	N/A	N/A
2017–18	19	29	11	12	N/A	N/A
2018–19	24	13	13	6	N/A	N/A
2019–20	35	27	—	32	N/A	N/A
2020–21	41	47	—	N/A	N/A	N/A
2021–22	41	37	40	35	N/A	N/A
2022–23	47	—	32	25	N/A	N/A
2023–24	52	32	—	—	N/A	N/A
2024–25	65	—	—	—	N/A	N/A
2025–26	46	50	39	N/A	N/A	N/A

=== Individual wins ===
No.	Season	Date	Location	Hill	Size
1	2001–02	17 March 2002	(Norway) Oslo	Holmenkollbakken K115	LH
2	2006–07	2 December 2006	(Norway) Lillehammer	Lysgårdsbakken HS134	LH
3	2006–07	18 March 2007	(Norway) Oslo	Holmenkollbakken HS128	LH
4	2008–09	29 November 2008	(Finland) Kuusamo	Rukatunturi HS142	LH
5	2008–09	7 December 2008	(Norway) Trondheim	Granåsen HS140	LH
6	2008–09	13 December 2008	(Italy) Pragelato	Stadio del Trampolino HS140	LH
7	2008–09	20 December 2008	(Switzerland) Engelberg	Gross-Titlis-Schanze HS137	LH
8	2008–09	29 December 2008	(Germany) Oberstdorf	Schattenbergschanze HS137	LH
9	2009–10	6 December 2009	(Norway) Lillehammer	Lysgårdsbakken HS138	LH
10	2009–10	18 December 2009	(Switzerland) Engelberg	Gross-Titlis-Schanze HS137	LH
11	2009–10	20 December 2009	(Switzerland) Engelberg	Gross-Titlis-Schanze HS137	LH
12	2009–10	17 January 2010	(Japan) Sapporo	Ōkurayama HS134	LH
13	2009–10	3 February 2010	(Germany) Klingenthal	Vogtland Arena HS140	LH
14	2009–10	7 March 2010	(Finland) Lahti	Salpausselkä HS130	LH
15	2009–10	9 March 2010	(Finland) Kuopio	Puijo HS127	LH
16	2009–10	12 March 2010	(Norway) Lillehammer	Lysgårdsbakken HS138	LH
17	2009–10	14 March 2010	(Norway) Oslo	Holmenkollbakken HS134	LH
18	2010–11	1 January 2011	(Germany) Garmisch-Partenkirchen	Große Olympiaschanze HS140	LH
19	2010–11	22 January 2011	(Poland) Zakopane	Wielka Krokiew HS134	LH
20	2010–11	13 March 2011	(Finland) Lahti	Salpausselkä HS130	LH
21	2013–14	29 December 2013	(Germany) Oberstdorf	Schattenbergschanze HS137	LH
22	2014–15	28 November 2014	(Finland) Kuusamo	Rukatunturi HS142	LH
23	2014–15	29 November 2014	(Finland) Kuusamo	Rukatunturi HS142	LH

== See also ==
- List of Olympic medalists in ski jumping
- List of FIS Nordic World Ski Championships medalists in ski jumping
- List of FIS Ski Flying World Championships medalists in ski flying

Awards and achievements
Preceded by André Bucher; Didier Cuche	Swiss Sportsmen of the Year; 2002; 2010	Succeeded by Roger Federer; Didier Cuche
Olympic Games
Preceded by Stéphane Lambiel	Flagbearer for Switzerland; Sochi 2014	Succeeded by Dario Cologna
