= 2008–09 FIS Ski Jumping Continental Cup =

Ski-jumping competition series

FIS Ski Jumping Continental Cup 2008/09
Discipline	Men	Women
Summer	(Austria) Daniel Lackner	(Germany) Ulrike Gräßler
Winter	(Austria) Stefan Thurnbichler	(Norway) Anette Sagen

Competition
Edition	7th (Summer), 18th (Winter)	1st (Summer), 5th (Winter)
Locations	6 (Summer), 16 (Winter)	6 (Summer), 10 (Winter)
Individual	11 (Summer), 33 (Winter)	10 (Summer), 18 (Winter)
Cancelled	— (Summer), — (Winter)	— (Summer), 1 (Winter)
Rescheduled	— (Summer), 2 (Winter)	1 (Summer), 3 (Winter)

The 2008/09 FIS Ski Jumping Continental Cup was the 18th in a row (16th official) Continental Cup winter season and the 7th official summer season in ski jumping for men. This was also the 5th winter and the 1st summer season for ladies.

This was also the fifth season (winter) and the first official summer season for women, both counted and ranked separately.

Beside the 5th consecutive overall title by Anette Sagen, the second German-Austrian Four Hills Ladies Tournament to Izumi Yamada.

Other competitive circuits in season were World Cup and Grand Prix.

== Men's Summer ==
Individual men's events in the CC history

Total	F	L	N	Winners
69	—	24	45

after normal hill event in Falun (12 October 2008)

=== Calendar ===
All	No.	Date	Place (Hill)	Size	Winner	Second	Third	Overall leader	R.
59	1	4 July 2008	(Slovenia) Velenje (Grajski grič HS94)	N _{039}	(Slovenia) Primož Pikl	(Slovenia) Robert Hrgota	(Czech Republic) Lukáš Hlava	(Slovenia) Primož Pikl	
60	2	5 July 2008	(Slovenia) Velenje (Grajski grič HS94)	N _{040}	(Germany) Pascal Bodmer	(Slovenia) Jure Šinkovec	(Slovenia) Primož Pikl	(Slovenia) Primož Pikl	
61	3	6 July 2008	(Slovenia) Kranj (Bauhenk HS109)	N _{041}	(Poland) Maciej Kot	(Poland) Stefan Hula	(Slovenia) Primož Pikl	(Slovenia) Primož Pikl	
62	4	13 September 2008	(Norway) Lillehammer (Lysgårdsbakken HS138)	L _{021}	(Germany) Severin Freund	(Austria) Markus Eggenhofer	(Austria) Daniel Lackner	(Slovenia) Primož Pikl	
63	5	14 September 2008	(Norway) Lillehammer (Lysgårdsbakken HS138)	L _{022}	(Norway) Andreas Vilberg	(Austria) Daniel Lackner	(Austria) Markus Eggenhofer	(Slovenia) Primož Pikl	
64	6	20 September 2008	(Austria) Villach (Villacher Alpenarena HS98)	N _{042}	(Austria) Manuel Fettner	(Austria) Wolfgang Loitzl	(Austria) Nicolas Fettner	(Austria) Manuel Fettner	
65	7	21 September 2008	(Austria) Villach (Villacher Alpenarena HS98)	N _{043}	(Austria) Markus Eggenhofer	(Austria) Wolfgang Loitzl	(Austria) Manuel Fettner	(Austria) Markus Eggenhofer	
66	8	26 September 2008	(Germany) Oberstdorf (Schattenberg HS137)	L _{023}	(Germany) Felix Schoft	(Austria) Wolfgang Loitzl	(Germany) Severin Freund	(Austria) Markus Eggenhofer	
67	9	27 September 2008	(Germany) Oberstdorf (Schattenberg HS137)	L _{024}	(Czech Republic) Jakub Janda	(Austria) Markus Eggenhofer	(Germany) Severin Freund	(Austria) Markus Eggenhofer	
68	10	11 October 2008	(Sweden) Falun (Lugnet HS98)	N _{044}	(Austria) Daniel Lackner	(Germany) Severin Freund	(Germany) Jörg Ritzerfeld	(Austria) Markus Eggenhofer	
69	11	12 October 2008	(Sweden) Falun (Lugnet HS98)	N _{045}	(Austria) Daniel Lackner	(Germany) Danny Queck	(Germany) Christian Ulmer	(Austria) Daniel Lackner	
7th FIS Summer Continental Cup Men's Overall (4 July – 12 October 2008)					(Austria) Daniel Lackner	(Austria) Markus Eggenhofer	(Germany) Severin Freund	Summer Overall	

==== Overall ====
Rank	after 11 events	Points
1	(Austria) Daniel Lackner	459
2	(Austria) Markus Eggenhofer	457
3	(Germany) Severin Freund	393
4	(Austria) Manuel Fettner	361
5	(Slovenia) Primož Pikl	316
6	(Austria) Wolfgang Loitzl	285
7	(Austria) Nicolas Fettner	269
8	(Germany) Pascal Bodmer	213
9	(Germany) Julian Musiol	203
10	(Czech Republic) Jakub Janda	182

== Men's Winter ==
Individual men's events in the CC history

Total	F	L	N	Winners
639	4	280	355

after large hill event in Kuusamo (22 March 2009)

=== Calendar ===
All	No.	Date	Place (Hill)	Size	Winner	Second	Third	Overall leader	R.
607	1	9 December 2008	(Finland) Rovaniemi (Ounasvaara HS100)	N _{349}	(Germany) Stephan Hocke	(Germany) Pascal Bodmer	(Austria) Manuel Fettner	(Germany) Stephan Hocke	
608	2	10 December 2008	(Finland) Rovaniemi (Ounasvaara HS100)	N _{350}	(Germany) Stephan Hocke	(Germany) Pascal Bodmer	(Austria) Daniel Lackner	(Germany) Stephan Hocke	
609	3	13 December 2008	(Norway) Vikersund (Vikersundbakken HS117)	L _{255}	(Germany) Stephan Hocke	(Austria) Daniel Lackner	(Slovenia) Rok Urbanc	(Germany) Stephan Hocke	
610	4	14 December 2008	(Norway) Vikersund (Vikersundbakken HS117)	L _{256}	(Germany) Stephan Hocke	(Germany) Tobias Bogner	(Austria) David Unterberger	(Germany) Stephan Hocke	
611	5	20 December 2008	(Czech Republic) Liberec (Ještěd A HS134)	L _{257}	(Austria) Daniel Lackner	(Austria) Florian Schabereiter (Russia) Roman Trofimov		(Germany) Stephan Hocke	
612	6	(Note: Cancelled men's event from Liberec (21 December) was rescheduled to 20 December (second event).)20 December 2008	(Czech Republic) Liberec (Ještěd A HS134)	L _{258}	(Norway) A. Pedersen Rønsen	(Slovenia) Rok Urbanc	(Czech Republic) Lukáš Hlava	(Germany) Stephan Hocke	
		21 December 2008	(Czech Republic) Liberec (Ještěd A HS134)	L _{cnx}	cancelled due to bad weather forecast and moved to 20 December			—	
613	7	27 December 2008	(Switzerland) Engelberg (Gross-Titlis HS137)	L _{259}				(Germany) Stephan Hocke	
614	8	28 December 2008	(Switzerland) Engelberg (Gross-Titlis HS137)	L _{260}				(Germany) Stephan Hocke	
615	9	3 January 2009	(Germany) Braunlage (Wurmbergschanze HS100)	N _{351}	(Czech Republic) Martin Cikl	(Austria) Andreas Strolz	(Czech Republic) Lukáš Hlava	(Germany) Stephan Hocke	
616	10	4 January 2009	(Germany) Braunlage (Wurmbergschanze HS100)	N _{352}					
617	11	9 January 2009	(Japan) Sapporo (Miyanomori HS98) (Ōkurayama HS134)	N _{353}	(Japan) Takanobu Okabe	(Norway) Jon Aaraas	(Japan) Shūsaku Hosoyama		
618	12	10 January 2009	(Japan) Sapporo (Miyanomori HS98) (Ōkurayama HS134)	L _{261}	(Norway) Vegard Haukø Sklett	(Germany) Christian Ulmer	(Germany) Maximilian Mechler		
619	13	11 January 2009	(Japan) Sapporo (Miyanomori HS98) (Ōkurayama HS134)	L _{262}	(Japan) Takanobu Okabe	(Japan) Kazuyoshi Funaki	(Norway) Vegard Haukø Sklett		
620	14	17 January 2009	(Austria) Bischofshofen (Paul-Ausserleitner HS140)	L _{263}	(Germany) Christian Ulmer	(Austria) Lukas Müller	(Norway) Kenneth Gangnes	(Czech Republic) Lukáš Hlava	
621	15	18 January 2009	(Austria) Bischofshofen (Paul-Ausserleitner HS140)	L _{264}	(Norway) Vegard Haukø Sklett	(Austria) Lukas Müller	(Czech Republic) Lukáš Hlava	(Czech Republic) Lukáš Hlava	
622	16	24 January 2009	(Slovenia) Kranj (Bauhenk HS109)	N _{354}	(Germany) Julian Musiol	(Czech Republic) Ondřej Vaculík	(Slovenia) Žiga Mandl	(Czech Republic) Lukáš Hlava	
623	17	25 January 2009	(Slovenia) Kranj (Bauhenk HS109)	N _{355}	(Poland) Rafał Śliż	(Slovenia) Peter Prevc	(Slovenia) Primož Pikl	(Czech Republic) Lukáš Hlava	
624	18	31 January 2009	(Germany) Titisee-Neustadt (Hochfirstschanze HS142)	L _{265}	(Czech Republic) Jakub Janda	(Czech Republic) Ondřej Vaculík	(Germany) Pascal Bodmer	(Czech Republic) Lukáš Hlava	
625	19	1 February 2009	(Germany) Titisee-Neustadt (Hochfirstschanze HS142)	L _{266}	(Czech Republic) Jakub Janda	(Austria) Roland Müller	(Austria) Daniel Lackner	(Czech Republic) Lukáš Hlava	
626	20	7 February 2009	(Poland) Zakopane (Wielka Krokiew HS134)	L _{267}	(Slovakia) Tomáš Zmoray	(Czech Republic) Borek Sedlák	(Poland) Marcin Bachleda	(Czech Republic) Lukáš Hlava	
627	21	8 February 2009	(Poland) Zakopane (Wielka Krokiew HS134)	L _{268}	(Czech Republic) Lukáš Hlava	(Czech Republic) Jan Matura	(Czech Republic) Borek Sedlák	(Czech Republic) Lukáš Hlava	
628	22	14 February 2009	(United States) Iron Mountain (Pine Mountain HS133)	L _{269}	(Austria) Lukas Müller	(Austria) Stefan Thurnbichler	(Norway) Jon Aaraas	(Czech Republic) Lukáš Hlava	
629	23	15 February 2009	(United States) Iron Mountain (Pine Mountain HS133)	L _{270}	(Austria) Lukas Müller	(Austria) Stefan Thurnbichler	(Slovenia) Anže Damjan	(Czech Republic) Lukáš Hlava	
630	24	21 February 2009	(Germany) Brotterode (Inselbergschanze HS117)	L _{271}	(Austria) Lukas Müller	(Austria) Stefan Thurnbichler	(Slovenia) Primož Pikl	(Czech Republic) Lukáš Hlava	
631	25	22 February 2009	(Germany) Brotterode (Inselbergschanze HS117)	L _{272}	(Austria) Stefan Thurnbichler	(Norway) Jon Aaraas	(Austria) Lukas Müller	(Czech Republic) Lukáš Hlava	
632	26	28 February 2009	(Poland) Wisła (Malinka HS134)	L _{273}	(Austria) Stefan Thurnbichler	(Norway) K. R. Elverum Sorsell (Austria) Andreas Kofler		(Austria) S. Thurnbichler	
633	27	1 March 2009	(Poland) Wisła (Malinka HS134)	L _{274}	(Austria) Andreas Kofler	(Norway) Bjørn Einar Romøren	(Norway) Jon Aaraas	(Austria) S. Thurnbichler	
634	28	7 March 2009	(Norway) Trondheim (Granåsen HS140)	L _{275}	(Austria) Stefan Thurnbichler	(Austria) Manuel Fettner	(Slovenia) Matic Kramaršič	(Austria) S. Thurnbichler	
635	29	8 March 2009	(Norway) Trondheim (Granåsen HS140)	L _{276}	(Norway) Thomas Lobben	(Norway) Vegard Haukø Sklett	(Austria) Stefan Thurnbichler	(Austria) S. Thurnbichler	
636	30	14 March 2009	(Italy) Pragelato (Stadio del Tramp. HS140)	L _{277}	(Germany) Severin Freund	(Germany) Danny Queck	(Germany) Nico Polychronidis	(Austria) S. Thurnbichler	
637	31	15 March 2009	(Italy) Pragelato (Stadio del Tramp. HS140)	L _{278}	(Germany) Severin Freund	(Slovenia) Peter Prevc	(Slovenia) Matic Kramaršič	(Austria) S. Thurnbichler	
		21 March 2009	(Finland) Kuusamo (Rukatunturi HS142)	L _{cnx}	cancelled due to bad weather forecast and moved 22 December			—	
638	32	(Note: Cancelled men's event from Kuusamo (21 March) was rescheduled to 22 March (first event).)22 March 2009	(Finland) Kuusamo (Rukatunturi HS142)	L _{279}	(Austria) Manuel Fettner	(Norway) Jon Aaraas	(Austria) Andreas Kofler	(Austria) S. Thurnbichler	
639	33	22 March 2009	(Finland) Kuusamo (Rukatunturi HS142)	L _{280}	(Austria) Andreas Kofler	(Norway) Jon Aaraas	(Norway) Thomas Lobben	(Austria) S. Thurnbichler	
18th FIS Winter Continental Cup Men's Overall (9 December 2008 – 23 March 2009)					(Austria) Stefan Thurnbichler	(Czech Republic) Lukáš Hlava	(Germany) Christian Ulmer	Winter Overall	

==== Overall ====
Rank	after 33 events	Points
1	(Austria) Stefan Thurnbichler	1045
2	(Czech Republic) Lukáš Hlava	951
3	(Germany) Christian Ulmer	787
4	(Norway) Jon Aaraas	751
5	(Austria) Manuel Fettner	725
6	(Austria) Daniel Lackner	657
7	(Norway) Kenneth Gangnes	651
8	(Austria) Lukas Müller	643
9	(Germany) Pascal Bodmer	596
10	(Norway) Vegard Haukø Sklett	552

== Women's Individual ==
Individual women's events in the CC history

Total	L	N	M	Winners
10	—	6	4

after normal hill event in Liberec (4 October 2008)

=== Calendar ===
All	No.	Date	Place (Hill)	Size	Winner	Second	Third	Overall leader	R.
1	1	10 August 2008	(Germany) Bischofsgrün (Ochsenkopfschanzen HS71)	M _{001}	(Germany) Magdalena Schnurr	(Canada) Nata de Leeuw	(Japan) Izumi Yamada	(Germany) M. Schnurr	
2	2	13 August 2008	(Germany) Pöhla (Pöhlbachschanze HS65)	M _{002}	(Germany) Magdalena Schnurr	(Japan) Izumi Yamada	(Austria) J. Seifriedsberger	(Germany) M. Schnurr	
		16 August 2008	(Austria) Ramsau (W90-Mattensprunganl. HS98)	N _{cnx}	cancelled and rescheduled to Bischofshofen on 16 January			—	
3	3	(Note: Cancelled women's summer event in Ramsau (16 August) was rescheduled at the same date in Bischofshofen.)16 August 2008	(Austria) Bischofshofen (Laideregg-Schanze HS78)	M _{003}	(Norway) Anette Sagen	(Japan) Izumi Yamada	(Slovenia) Maja Vtič	(Germany) M. Schnurr	
4	4	17 August 2008	(Austria) Bischofshofen (Laideregg-Schanze HS78)	M _{004}	(Japan) Izumi Yamada	(Germany) Jenna Mohr	(Austria) J. Seifriedsberger	(Japan) Izumi Yamada	
2nd German-Austrian Four Hills Ladies Tournament Overall (10 – 17 August 2008)					(Japan) Izumi Yamada	(Germany) Magdalena Schnurr	(Austria) J. Seifriedsberger	German-Austrian FH	
5	5	13 September 2008	(Norway) Lillehammer (Lysgårdsbakken HS100)	N _{001}	(United States) Alissa Johnson	(United States) Jessica Jerome	(Germany) Ulrike Gräßler	(Japan) Izumi Yamada	
6	6	14 September 2008	(Norway) Lillehammer (Lysgårdsbakken HS100)	N _{002}	(Norway) Line Jahr	(United States) Jessica Jerome	(Norway) Anette Sagen	(Japan) Izumi Yamada	
7	7	26 September 2008	(Germany) Oberstdorf (Schattenberg HS100)	N _{003}	(Germany) Ulrike Gräßler	(Germany) Magdalena Schnurr	(United States) Jessica Jerome	(Germany) Ulrike Gräßler	
8	8	27 September 2008	(Germany) Oberstdorf (Schattenberg HS100)	N _{004}	(Norway) Anette Sagen	(Germany) Ulrike Gräßler	(United States) Lindsey Van	(Germany) Ulrike Gräßler	
9	9	3 October 2008	(Czech Republic) Liberec (Ještěd A HS100)	N _{005}	(Germany) Ulrike Gräßler	(Japan) Izumi Yamada	(Germany) Magdalena Schnurr	(Germany) Ulrike Gräßler	
10	10	4 October 2008	(Czech Republic) Liberec (Ještěd A HS100)	N _{006}	(Germany) Ulrike Gräßler	(Canada) Nata de Leeuw	(United States) Alissa Johnson	(Germany) Ulrike Gräßler	
1st FIS Summer Continental Cup Women's Overall (10 August – 4 October 2008)					(Germany) Ulrike Gräßler	(Germany) Magdalena Schnurr	(Japan) Izumi Yamada	Summer Overall	

==== Overall ====
Rank	after 10 events	Points
1	(Germany) Ulrike Gräßler	652
2	(Germany) Magdalena Schnurr	497
3	(Japan) Izumi Yamada	491
4	(Norway) Anette Sagen	463
5	(Austria) J. Seifriedsberger	418
6	(United States) Alissa Johnson	357
7	(Germany) Jenna Mohr	357
8	(Norway) Line Jahr	327
9	(Canada) Nata de Leeuw	295
10	(United States) Lindsey Van	276

== Women's Winter ==
Individual women's events in the CC history

Total	L	N	M	Winners
85	1	68	16

after normal hill event in Sapporo (7 March 2009)

=== Calendar ===
All	No.	Date	Place (Hill)	Size	Winner	Second	Third	Overall leader	R.
68	1	(Note: Cancelled women's winter event in Park City (13 December) was rescheduled at the first event on 12 December.)12 December 2008	(United States) Park City (Utah Olympic Park HS100)	N _{052}	(Germany) Anna Häfele	(United States) Lindsey Van	(Austria) J. Seifriedsberger	(Germany) Anna Häfele	
69	2	(Note: Cancelled women's winter event in Park City (14 December) was rescheduled at the second event on 12 December.)12 December 2008	(United States) Park City (Utah Olympic Park HS100)	N _{053}	(Germany) Anna Häfele	(Canada) Nata De Leeuw	(Germany) Ulrike Gräßler	(Germany) Anna Häfele	
		13 December 2008	(United States) Park City (Utah Olympic Park HS100)	N _{cnx}	cancelled and both rescheduled to 12 December			—	
		14 December 2008	(United States) Park City (Utah Olympic Park HS100)	N _{cnx}	cancelled and both rescheduled to 12 December			—	
70	3	17 December 2008	(Canada) Whistler (Whistler Olympic Park HS106)	N _{054}	(Slovenia) Maja Vtič	(Germany) Ulrike Gräßler	(Norway) Anette Sagen	(Germany) Anna Häfele	
71	4	18 December 2008	(Canada) Whistler (Whistler Olympic Park HS106)	N _{055}	(Germany) Anna Häfele	(Norway) Anette Sagen	(Germany) Ulrike Gräßler	(Germany) Anna Häfele	
72	5	10 January 2009	(Germany) Schonach (Langenwaldschanze HS96)	N _{056}	(Austria) Daniela Iraschko	(Germany) Ulrike Gräßler	(Germany) Magdalena Schnurr	(Germany) Anna Häfele	
73	6	11 January 2009	(Germany) Schonach (Langenwaldschanze HS96)	N _{057}	(Austria) Daniela Iraschko	(Germany) Ulrike Gräßler	(United States) Lindsey Van	(Germany) Ulrike Gräßler	
74	7	17 January 2009	(Germany) Baiersbronn (Große Ruhesteinschanze HS90)	N _{058}	(Austria) Daniela Iraschko	(United States) Lindsey Van	(Norway) Anette Sagen	(Germany) Ulrike Gräßler	
75	8	18 January 2009	(Germany) Baiersbronn (Große Ruhesteinschanze HS90)	N _{059}	(United States) Lindsey Van	(Norway) Anette Sagen	(Norway) Line Jahr	(United States) Lindsey Van	
76	9	21 January 2009	(Italy) Toblach (Trampolino Sulzenhof HS74)	M _{016}	(Italy) Lisa Demetz		(Norway) Line Jahr	(United States) Lindsey Van	
77	10	24 January 2009	(Slovenia) Ljubno (Savina HS95)	N _{060}	(Germany) Magdalena Schnurr	(Norway) Anette Sagen	(Germany) Ulrike Gräßler	(Germany) Ulrike Gräßler	
78	11	25 January 2009	(Slovenia) Ljubno (Savina HS95)	N _{061}	(Norway) Anette Sagen	(Austria) Daniela Iraschko	(Germany) Ulrike Gräßler	(Norway) Anette Sagen	
79	12	7 February 2009	(Poland) Zakopane (Średnia Krokiew HS94)	N _{062}	(United States) Sarah Hendrickson	(Germany) Juliane Seyfarth	(United States) Lindsey Van	(Norway) Anette Sagen	
		8 February 2009	(Poland) Zakopane (Średnia Krokiew HS94)	N _{cnx}	cancelled due to bad weather conditions			—	
80	13	13 February 2009	(Norway) Notodden (Tveitanbakken HS100)	N _{063}	(Austria) Daniela Iraschko	(Norway) Anette Sagen	(United States) Lindsey Van	(Norway) Anette Sagen	
81	14	14 February 2009	(Norway) Notodden (Tveitanbakken HS100)	N _{064}	(Austria) Daniela Iraschko	(United States) Lindsey Van	(Norway) Anette Sagen	(Norway) Anette Sagen	
82	15	3 March 2009	(Japan) Zaō (Yamagata HS100)	N _{065}	(Norway) Anette Sagen	(Austria) Daniela Iraschko (Japan) Izumi Yamada		(Norway) Anette Sagen	
83	16	4 March 2009	(Japan) Zaō (Yamagata HS100)	N _{066}	(Norway) Anette Sagen	(Austria) Daniela Iraschko	(United States) Lindsey Van	(Norway) Anette Sagen	
		6 March 2009	(Japan) Sapporo (Miyanomori HS100)	N _{cnx}	cancelled and rescheduled to second event on 7 March			—	
84	17	7 March 2009	(Japan) Sapporo (Miyanomori HS100)	N _{067}	(Norway) Anette Sagen	(Germany) Ulrike Gräßler	(Austria) Daniela Iraschko	(Norway) Anette Sagen	
85	18	(Note: Cancelled women's winter event in Sapporo (6 March) was rescheduled at the second event on 7 March.)7 March 2009	(Japan) Sapporo (Miyanomori HS100)	N _{068}	(Germany) Jenna Mohr	(Germany) Ulrike Gräßler	(Austria) Daniela Iraschko	(Norway) Anette Sagen	
5th FIS Continental Cup Women's Overall (12 December 2008 – 7 March 2009)					(Norway) Anette Sagen	(Austria) Daniela Iraschko	(Germany) Ulrike Gräßler	Winter Overall	

==== Overall ====
Rank	after 18 events	Points
1	(Norway) Anette Sagen	1091
2	(Austria) Daniela Iraschko	932
3	(Germany) Ulrike Gräßler	927
4	(United States) Lindsey Van	882
5	(Germany) Jenna Mohr	567
6	(Germany) Anna Häfele	557
7	(Austria) J. Seifriedsberger	503
8	(Canada) Nata De Leeuw	489
9	(Norway) Line Jahr	423
10	(Slovenia) Maja Vtič	409

== Team events ==
Team events in the CC history

Total	N	M	Winners	Competition
4	2	2	3	Women's team

after women's MH team event in Breitenberg (11 February 2007)

=== Calendar ===
Num	Season	Date	Place (Hill)	Size	Winner	Second	Third
Women's summer team
		9 August 2008	(Germany) Bischofsgrün (Ochsenkopfschanzen HS71)	M _{cnx}	cancelled		

== Europa Cup vs. Continental Cup ==
- Last two Europa Cup seasons (1991/92 and 1992/93) are recognized as first two Continental Cup seasons by International Ski Federation (FIS), although Continental Cup under this name officially started first season in 1993/94 season.

== See also ==
- 2008–09 FIS Ski Jumping World Cup
- 2008 FIS Ski Jumping Grand Prix
