= Ulma =

Ulma or ULMA may refer to:

== Place names ==
- Latin and Italian name of the German city Ulm
- Ulma, Amur Oblast, a rural locality in Amur Oblast, Russia
- Ulma (river), Amur Oblast, Russia
- Ulma, Iran (disambiguation), places in Iran
- Ulma, Suceava, a commune in Romania

== People with the surname ==
- Ulma family ([Various dates]-1944), Polish Righteous Among the Nations who were beatified as martyrs in 2023

== See also ==
- Ulm (disambiguation)
- Ulmer
- Ulam (disambiguation)
