= 2008 FIS Ski Jumping Grand Prix =

International ski jumping competition

Grand Prix 2008
Winners
- Overall: (Austria) Gregor Schlierenzauer
- Four Nations GP: (Austria) Gregor Schlierenzauer
- Nations Cup: Austria

Competitions
- Venues: 8
- Individual: 10
- Team: 1
- Cancelled: 1

The 2008 FIS Ski Jumping Grand Prix was the 15th Summer Grand Prix season in ski jumping on plastic. Season began on 26 July 2008 in Hinterzarten, Germany and ended on 4 October 2008 in Liberec.

Other competitive circuits this season included the World Cup and Continental Cup.

== Calendar ==
=== Men ===
Num	Season	Date	Place	Hill	Size	Winner	Second	Third	Yellow bib	Ref.
89	1	27 July 2008	(Germany) Hinterzarten	Rothaus-Schanze HS108	NH	(Germany) Georg Späth	(Austria) Andreas Kofler	(Austria) Thomas Morgenstern	(Germany) Georg Späth	
90	2	1 August 2008	(Switzerland) Einsiedeln	Andreas Küttel Schanze HS117	LH	(Austria) Andreas Kofler	(Austria) Gregor Schlierenzauer	(Austria) Thomas Morgenstern	(Austria) Andreas Kofler	
91	3	3 August 2008	(France) Courchevel	Tremplin du Praz HS132 (night)	LH	(Finland) Harri Olli	(Germany) Georg Späth	(Switzerland) Simon Ammann	(Germany) Georg Späth	
92	4	5 August 2008	(Italy) Pragelato	Trempolino a Monte HS140 (night)	LH	(Austria) Gregor Schlierenzauer	(Czech Republic) Roman Koudelka	(Finland) Harri Olli	(Austria) Gregor Schlierenzauer	
3rd Four-Nations-Grand-Prix Overall (27 July – 5 August 2008)						(Austria) Gregor Schlierenzauer	(Austria) Andreas Kofler	(Switzerland) Simon Ammann		
		29 August 2008	(Poland) Zakopane	Wielka Krokiew HS134 (night)	~~LH~~	rescheduled on next day				
93	5	30 August 2008	(Poland) Zakopane	Wielka Krokiew HS134	LH	(Austria) Gregor Schlierenzauer	(Germany) Michael Uhrmann	(Switzerland) Simon Ammann	(Austria) Gregor Schlierenzauer	
94	6	30 August 2008	(Poland) Zakopane	Wielka Krokiew HS134 (night)	LH	(Austria) Gregor Schlierenzauer	(Germany) Michael Uhrmann	(Poland) Łukasz Rutkowski	(Austria) Gregor Schlierenzauer	
95	7	13 September 2008	(Japan) Hakuba	Olympic Ski Jumps HS131 (night)	LH	(Switzerland) Simon Ammann	(Japan) Daiki Ito	(Switzerland) Andreas Küttel	(Austria) Gregor Schlierenzauer	
96	8	14 September 2008	(Japan) Hakuba	Olympic Ski Jumps HS131 (night)	LH	(Switzerland) Simon Ammann	(Japan) Daiki Ito	(Norway) Roar Ljøkelsøy	(Switzerland) Simon Ammann	
97	9	3 October 2008	(Germany) Klingenthal	Vogtland Arena HS140	LH	(Austria) Gregor Schlierenzauer	(Switzerland) Simon Ammann	(Austria) Martin Koch	(Austria) Gregor Schlierenzauer	
98	10	4 October 2008	(Czech Republic) Liberec	Ještěd A HS134 (night)	LH	(Austria) Gregor Schlierenzauer	(Japan) Daiki Ito	(Austria) Martin Koch	(Austria) Gregor Schlierenzauer	

=== Men's team ===
Num	Season	Date	Place	Hill	Size	Winner	Second	Third	Yellow bib	Ref.
11	1	26 July 2008	(Germany) Hinterzarten	Rothaus-Schanze HS108	NH	Austria Andreas Kofler; Manuel Fettner; Gregor Schlierenzauer; Thomas Morgenstern	Germany Michael Uhrmann; Martin Schmitt; Georg Späth; Michael Neumayer	Czech Republic Ondřej Vaculík; Borek Sedlák; Jan Matura; Roman Koudelka	Austria	

== Standings ==
=== Overall ===
Rank	after 10 events	Points
1	(Austria) Gregor Schlierenzauer	670
2	(Switzerland) Simon Ammann	617
3	(Germany) Michael Uhrmann	346
4	(Switzerland) Andreas Küttel	326
5	(Austria) Andreas Kofler	318

=== Nations Cup ===
Rank	after 11 events	Points
1	Austria	2041
2	Germany	1563
3	Switzerland	943
4	Japan	925
5	Norway	733

=== Four Nations Grand Prix ===
Rank	after 4 events	Points
1	(Austria) Gregor Schlierenzauer	913.2
2	(Austria) Andreas Kofler	908.3
3	(Switzerland) Simon Ammann	897.6
4	(Austria) Thomas Morgenstern	891.4
5	(Germany) Michael Uhrmann	874.6
