= Hochfirst Ski Jump =

Ski jumping hill in Titisee-Neustadt, Germany

Hochfirst Ski Jump (Hochfirstschanze)
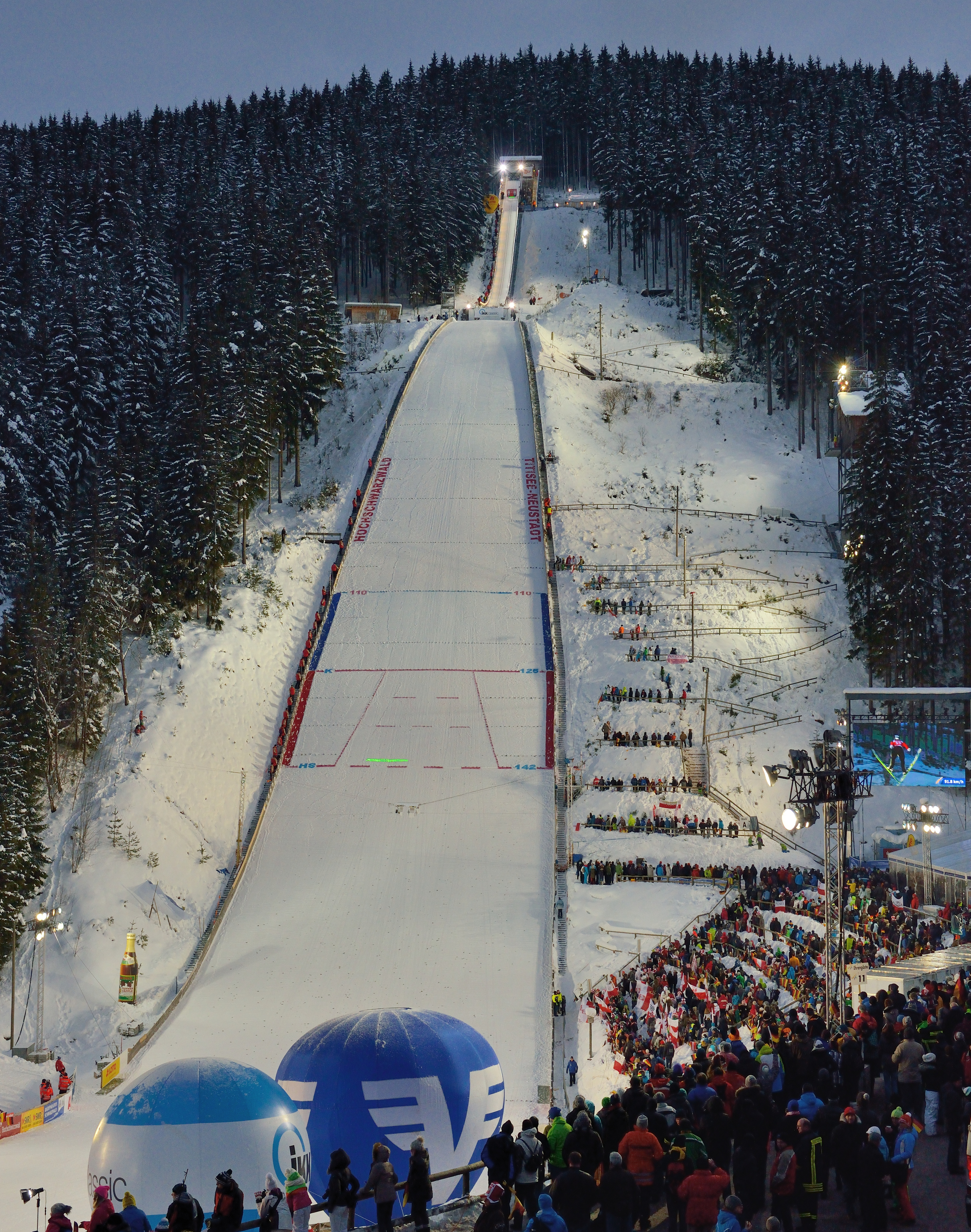
- Location: Titisee-Neustadt; Germany
- Coordinates: 47°54′15″N 8°13′09″E
- Opened: 1950
- Renovated: 2001

Size
- K–point: 125 m
- Hill size: 142 m
- Longest jump (unofficial / fall): 150 m (486 ft); Maximilian Mechler (GER) (21 January 2011)
- Hill record: 148 m (464 ft); Domen Prevc (SLO) (11 March 2016)

The Hochfirst Ski Jump (German: Hochfirstschanze) is a ski jumping hill located in Titisee-Neustadt in the state of Baden-Württemberg in Germany. The ski jump is named after the mountain Hochfirst (1197 m) in the Black Forest. It is the biggest natural ski jumping hill. This means that in contrast to many other ski jumping facilities, rather than an artificial tower, the natural gradient of the mountain slope was used for construction.

== History ==
In 1911, the first ski jumping hill at Neustadt in the Black Forest was built at the Mühlrain. From 1930 to 1932, the first Hochfirstschanze in Schmiedsbachtal was constructed as a 60-meter hill. It was inaugurated on December 31, 1933, in front of an attendance of 3,000 spectators. 10,000 spectators came to the hill during the Wehrmacht Championships in February 1938.

After World War II, the Ski Club Neustadt developed the idea to build a new large hill together with the ski jumpers Toni Brutscher, Sepp Weiler and Heini Klopfer from Oberstdorf. The natural K80 hill was planned by Heini Klopfer and constructed next to the old hill from August to December 1949. The Hochfirstschanze could be inaugurated on 1950-01-15, where 15,000 spectators could watch jumps of up to 95 meters.

The take-off area of the large hill was modified in 1971 and the hill was extended with a k-spot of 90 m, later 101 m. Furthermore, a bend in the inrun was straightened in 1971. In 1976, German Nationals were again held in Titisee-Neustadt and since 1978 competitions of Schwarzwälder Springertournee were held there, which later became part of Europe Cup and Continental Cup. A profound conversion of the landing hill and modifications to the take-off were carried out in 1987–88, enlarging the critical point to 113 m.

Next to the former 60-meter-hill, the Fritz-Heitzmann-K40 junior hill was reconstructed and covered with plastic mattings in 1993.

In 2000, almost 4 Mio. Euro were invested in order to modernize Hochfirstschanze as a World Cup-ready K120 ski jump. After a Continental Cup competition for the inauguration on February 10 and 11, 2001, the first Ski Jumping World Cup event in the Black Forest was hosted in December 2001. In 2003–2004, the hill profile was slightly changed from K120 to K125 (HS 142). The Hochfirstschanze has since been regular host of Ski Jumping World Cup and Continental Cup competitions, although the organizers often had to fight lack of snow and difficult weather conditions.

== International contests ==
The following list includes all jumping competitions organized by the FIS:

| Date | Competition | Jump | 1st | 2nd | 3rd |
|---|---|---|---|---|---|
| 27 February 1999 | 1998–99 FIS Ski Jumping Continental Cup | K120 | (Austria) Matthias Wallner | (Finland) Matti Hautamäki | (Norway) Olav Magne Dønnem |
| 27 February 2000 | 1999–2000 FIS Ski Jumping Continental Cup | K120 | (Austria) Wolfgang Loitzl | (Slovenia) Bine Norčič | (Finland) Kimmo Yliriesto |
| 10 February 2001 | 2000–01 FIS Ski Jumping Continental Cup | K120 | (Austria): Reinhard Schwarzenberger; Manuel Fettner; Martin Koch; Stefan Kaiser | (Germany): Frank Reichel; Christof Duffner; Hansjörg Jäkle; Georg Späth | (Slovenia): Rok Benkovič; Simon Podrebršek; Primož Pikl; Grega Podržaj |
| 11 February 2001 | 2000–01 FIS Ski Jumping Continental Cup | K120 | (Austria) Manuel Fettner | (Austria) Reinhard Schwarzenberger | (Germany) Georg Späth |
| 1 December 2001 | 2001–02 FIS Ski Jumping World Cup | K120 | (Poland) Adam Małysz | (Germany) Martin Schmitt | (Germany) Stephan Hocke |
| 2 December 2001 | 2001–02 FIS Ski Jumping World Cup | K120 | (Germany) Sven Hannawald | (Poland) Adam Małysz | (Austria) Andreas Goldberger |
| 15 December 2002 | 2002–03 FIS Ski Jumping World Cup | K120 | (Austria) Martin Höllwarth | (Norway) Sigurd Pettersen | (Poland) Adam Małysz |
| 15 December 2002 | 2002–03 FIS Ski Jumping World Cup | K120 | (Austria) Martin Höllwarth | (Austria) Andreas Goldberger | (Austria) Andreas Kofler |
| 25 January 2003 | 2002–03 FIS Ski Jumping Continental Cup | K120 | (Germany) Christof Duffner | (Norway) Daniel Forfang | (Germany) Kai Bracht |
| 26 January 2003 | 2002–03 FIS Ski Jumping Continental Cup | K120 | (Poland) Robert Mateja | (Slovenia) Igor Medved | (Norway) Daniel Forfang |
| 13 December 2003 | 2003–04 FIS Ski Jumping World Cup | K120 | Competition canceled due to strong winds | | |
| 14 December 2003 | 2003–04 FIS Ski Jumping World Cup | K120 | (Finland) Tami Kiuru | (Austria) Andreas Widhölzl | (Finland) Janne Ahonen |
| 22 January 2005 | 2004–05 FIS Ski Jumping World Cup | HS142 | (Finland) Janne Ahonen | (Czech Republic) Jakub Janda | (Austria) Thomas Morgenstern |
| 23 January 2005 | 2004–05 FIS Ski Jumping World Cup | HS142 | (Czech Republic) Jakub Janda | (Poland) Adam Małysz | (Finland) Risto Jussilainen |
| 21 January 2006 | 2005–06 FIS Ski Jumping Continental Cup | HS142 | (Austria) Bastian Kaltenböck | (Austria) Roland Müller | (Austria) Mathias Hafele |
| 22 January 2006 | 2005–06 FIS Ski Jumping Continental Cup | HS142 | (Austria) Gerald Wambacher | (Austria) Bastian Kaltenböck | (Finland) Arttu Lappi |
| 3 February 2007 | 2006–07 FIS Ski Jumping World Cup | HS142 | (Poland) Adam Małysz | (Austria) Andreas Kofler | (Norway) Anders Jacobsen |
| 4 February 2007 | 2006–07 FIS Ski Jumping World Cup | HS142 | (Poland) Adam Małysz | (Austria) Gregor Schlierenzauer | (Russia) Dmitri Wassiljew |
| 31 January 2009 | 2008–09 FIS Ski Jumping Continental Cup | HS142 | (Czech Republic) Jakub Janda | (Czech Republic) Ondřej Vaculík | (Germany) Pascal Bodmer |
| 1 February 2009 | 2008–09 FIS Ski Jumping Continental Cup | HS142 | (Czech Republic) Jakub Janda | (Austria) Roland Müller | (Austria) Daniel Lackner |
| 16 January 2010 | 2009–10 FIS Ski Jumping Continental Cup | HS142 | (Austria) Michael Hayböck | (Austria) Björn Koch | (Czech Republic) Borek Sedlák |
| 17 January 2010 | 2009–10 FIS Ski Jumping Continental Cup | HS142 | Competition canceled due to strong winds | | |
| 22 January 2011 | 2010–11 FIS Ski Jumping Continental Cup | HS142 | (Germany) Maximilian Mechler | (Slovenia) Matic Kramaršič | (Austria) Manuel Poppinger |
| 23 January 2011 | 2010–11 FIS Ski Jumping Continental Cup | HS142 | (Germany) Maximilian Mechler | (Slovenia) Rok Zima | (Germany) Felix Schoft |
| 14 January 2012 | 2011–12 FIS Ski Jumping Continental Cup | HS142 | (Austria) Manuel Fettner | (Poland) Stefan Hula | (Norway) Robert Johansson |
| 15 January 2012 | 2011–12 FIS Ski Jumping Continental Cup | HS142 | (Austria) Manuel Fettner | (Czech Republic) Antonín Hájek | (Norway) Andreas Stjernen |
| 26 January 2013 | 2012–13 FIS Ski Jumping Continental Cup | HS142 | (Norway) Fredrik Bjerkeengen | (Austria) Manuel Fettner | (United States) Nicholas Alexander |
| 27 January 2013 | 2012–13 FIS Ski Jumping Continental Cup | HS142 | (Austria) Manuel Fettner | (Norway) Kim René Elverum Sorsell (Slovenia) Rok Justin | |
| 14 December 2013 | 2013–14 FIS Ski Jumping World Cup | HS142 | (Austria) Thomas Morgenstern | (Poland) Kamil Stoch | (Switzerland) Simon Ammann |
| 15 December 2013 | 2013–14 FIS Ski Jumping World Cup | HS142 | (Poland) Kamil Stoch | (Switzerland) Simon Ammann | (Japan) Noriaki Kasai |
| 7 February 2015 | 2014–15 FIS Ski Jumping World Cup | HS142 | (Germany) Severin Freund | (Austria) Stefan Kraft | (Slovenia) Peter Prevc |
| 8 February 2015 | 2014–15 FIS Ski Jumping World Cup | HS142 | (Norway) Anders Fannemel | (Poland) Kamil Stoch | (Czech Republic) Roman Koudelka |
| 28 February 2015 | 2014–15 FIS Ski Jumping Continental Cup | HS142 | (Norway) Kenneth Gangnes | (Slovenia) Jaka Hvala | Norway |
| 28 February 2015 | 2014–15 FIS Ski Jumping Continental Cup | HS142 | Norway | (Germany) Andreas Wank | (Germany) Pius Paschke |
| 1 March 2015 | 2014–15 FIS Ski Jumping Continental Cup | HS142 | (Norway) Halvor Egner Granerud | (Germany) Stephan Leyhe | (Germany) Andreas Wank (Poland) Krzysztof Biegun |
| 12 March 2016 | 2015–16 FIS Ski Jumping World Cup | HS142 | (Norway) Johann André Forfang | (Slovenia) Peter Prevc | (Norway) Kenneth Gangnes |
| 13 March 2016 | 2015–16 FIS Ski Jumping World Cup | HS142 | Competition canceled due to strong winds | | |
| 7 January 2017 | 2016–17 FIS Ski Jumping Continental Cup | HS142 | (Norway) Johann André Forfang | (Austria) Daniel Huber | (Poland) Klemens Murańka |
| 8 January 2017 | 2016–17 FIS Ski Jumping Continental Cup | HS142 | (Czech Republic) Viktor Polášek | (Norway) Johann André Forfang | (Austria) Clemens Aigner |
| 9 December 2017 | 2017–18 FIS Ski Jumping World Cup | HS142 | | | |
| 10 December 2017 | 2017–18 FIS Ski Jumping World Cup | HS142 | (Germany) Richard Freitag | (Germany) Andreas Wellinger | Norway |
| 6 January 2018 | 2017–18 FIS Ski Jumping Continental Cup | HS142 | (Norway) Marius Lindvik | (Slovenia) Nejc Dežman | (France) Vincent Descombes Sevoie |
| 7 January 2018 | 2017–18 FIS Ski Jumping Continental Cup | HS142 | (Germany) David Siegel | (Norway) Marius Lindvik | (Norway) Sondre Ringen |
| 8 December 2018 | 2018–19 FIS Ski Jumping World Cup | HS142 | Competitions canceled due to warm temperatures and heavy precipitation | | |
| 9 December 2018 | 2018–19 FIS Ski Jumping World Cup | HS142 | Competitions canceled due to warm temperatures and heavy precipitation | | |
| 9 December 2018 | 2018–19 FIS Ski Jumping World Cup | HS142 | Competitions canceled due to warm temperatures and heavy precipitation | | |
| 18 January 2020 | 2019–20 FIS Ski Jumping World Cup | HS142 | (Poland) Dawid Kubacki | (Austria) Stefan Kraft | (Japan) Ryōyū Kobayashi |
| 19 January 2020 | 2019–20 FIS Ski Jumping World Cup | HS142 | (Poland) Dawid Kubacki | (Japan) Ryōyū Kobayashi | (Slovenia) Timi Zajc |
| January 2021 | 2020–21 FIS Ski Jumping World Cup | HS142 | Due to COVID-19 regulations, visitors will not be able to watch the competition in Titisee-Neustadt. | | |

== Photo gallery ==
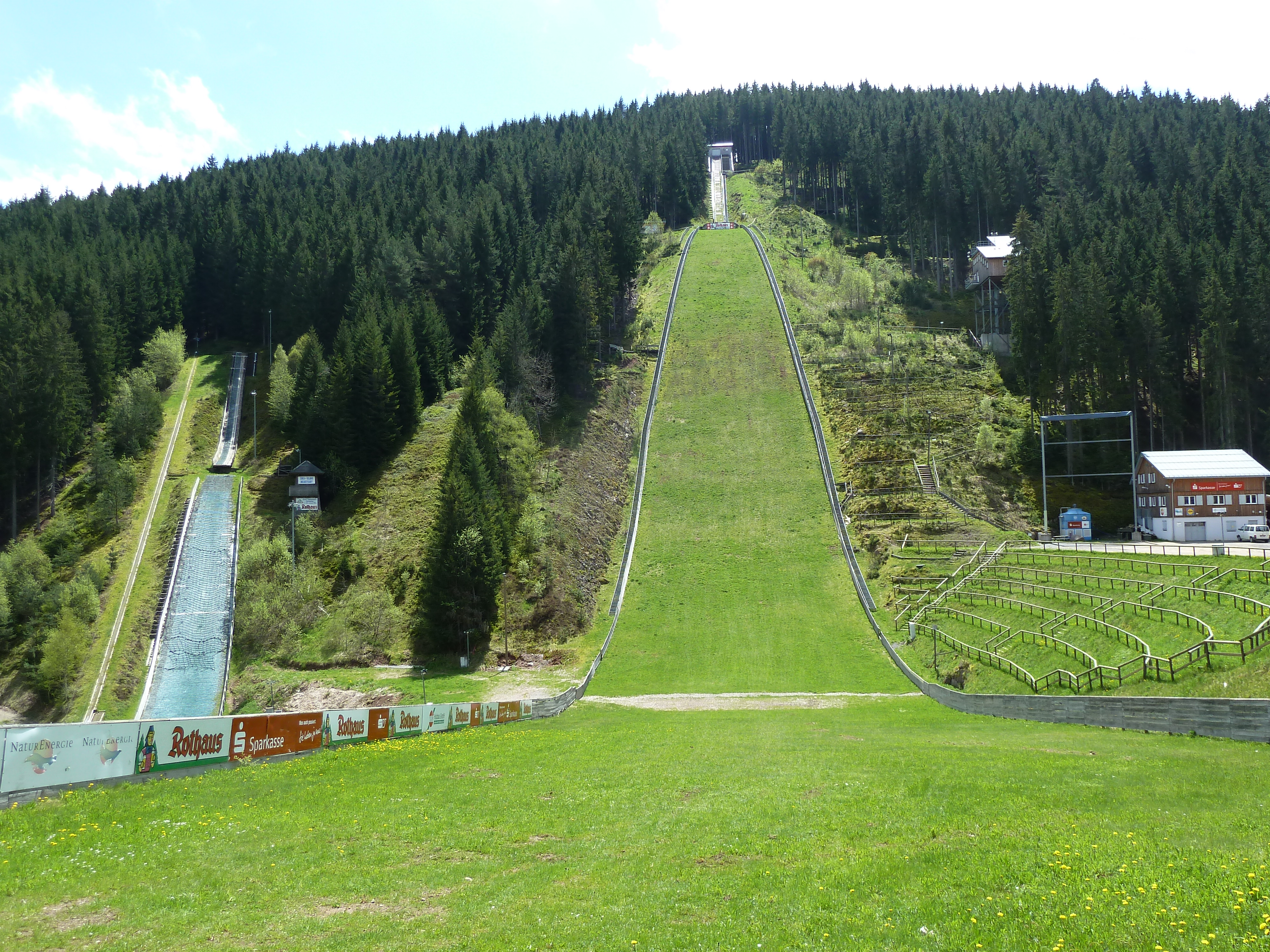
Left: Fritz-Hermann-Schanze, right: Hochfirstschanze

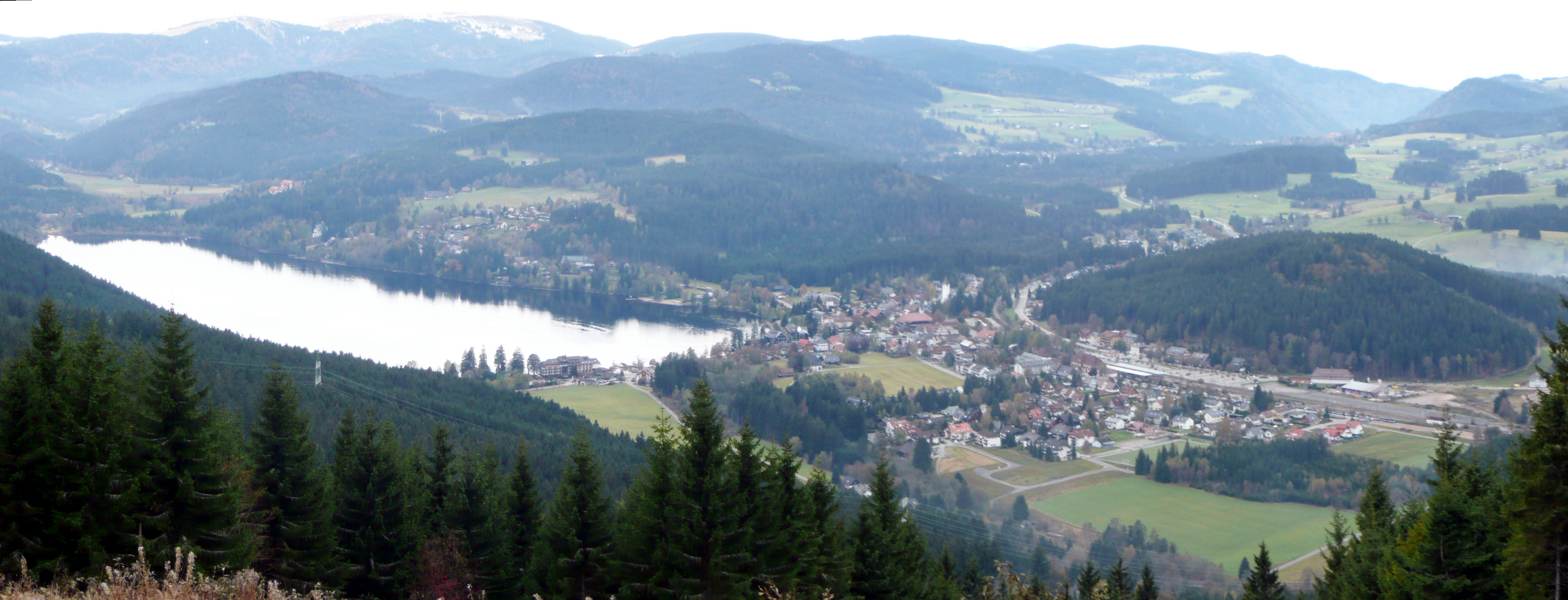
Hochfirst mountain panorama

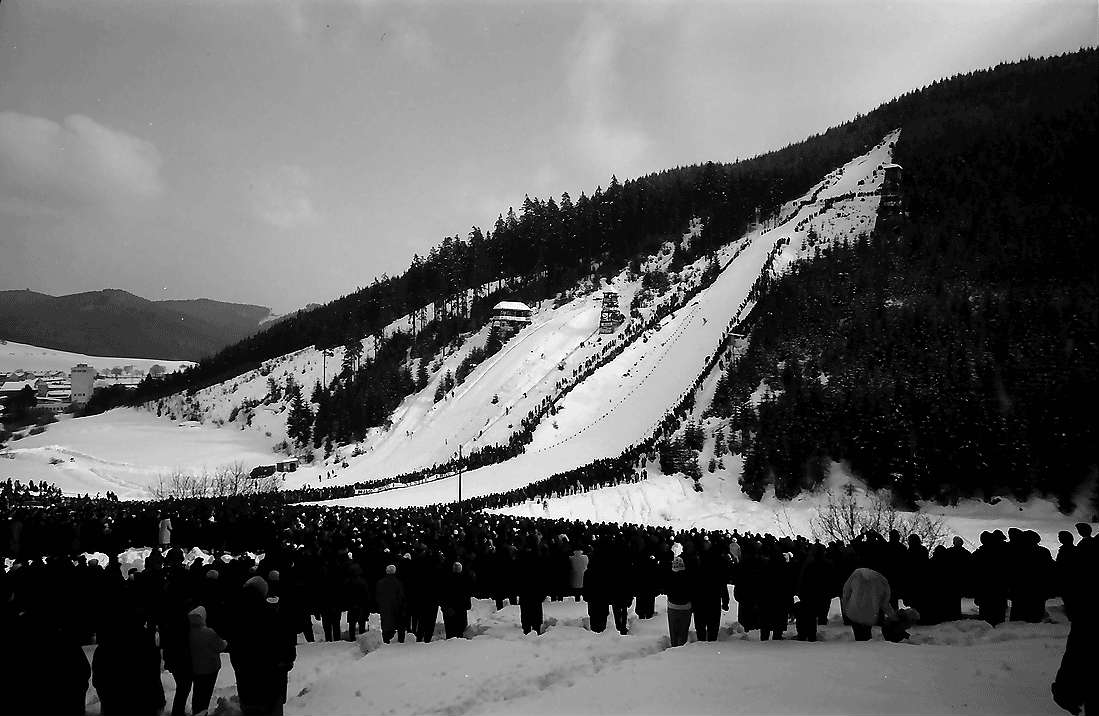
The Hochfirstschanze with visitors in 1963

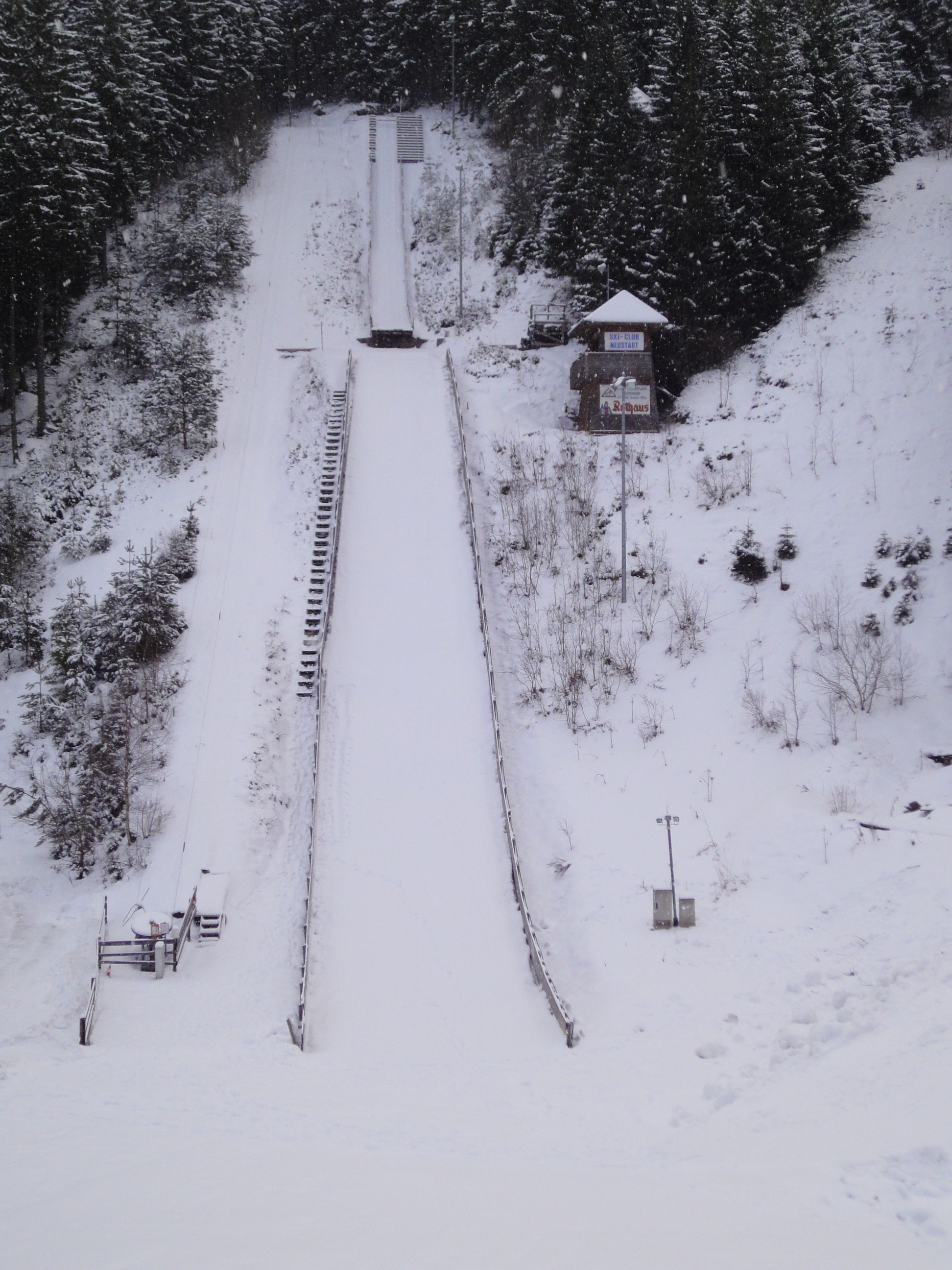
Fritz-Heitzmann-Schanze

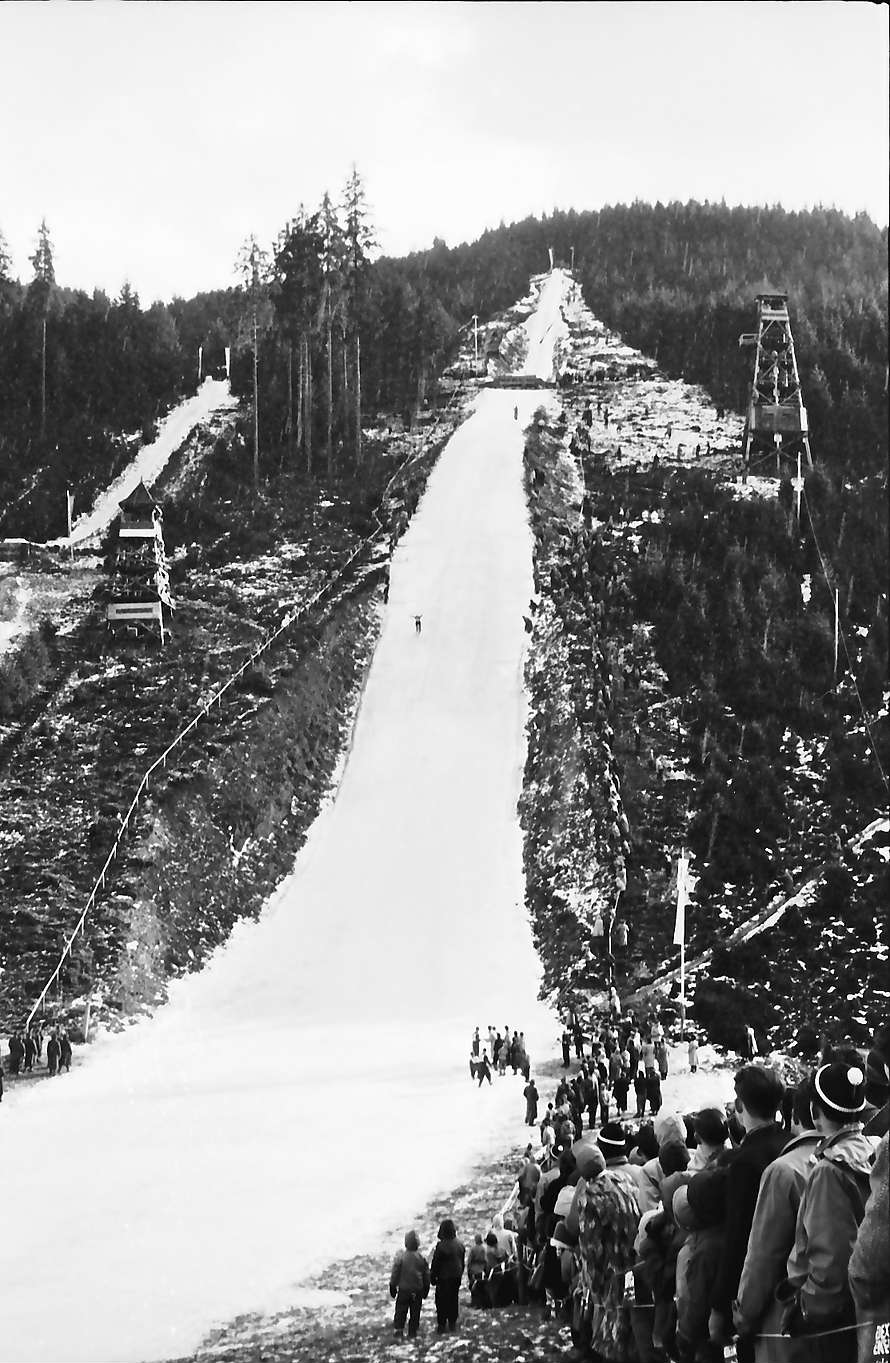
The Hochfirstschanze in 1955

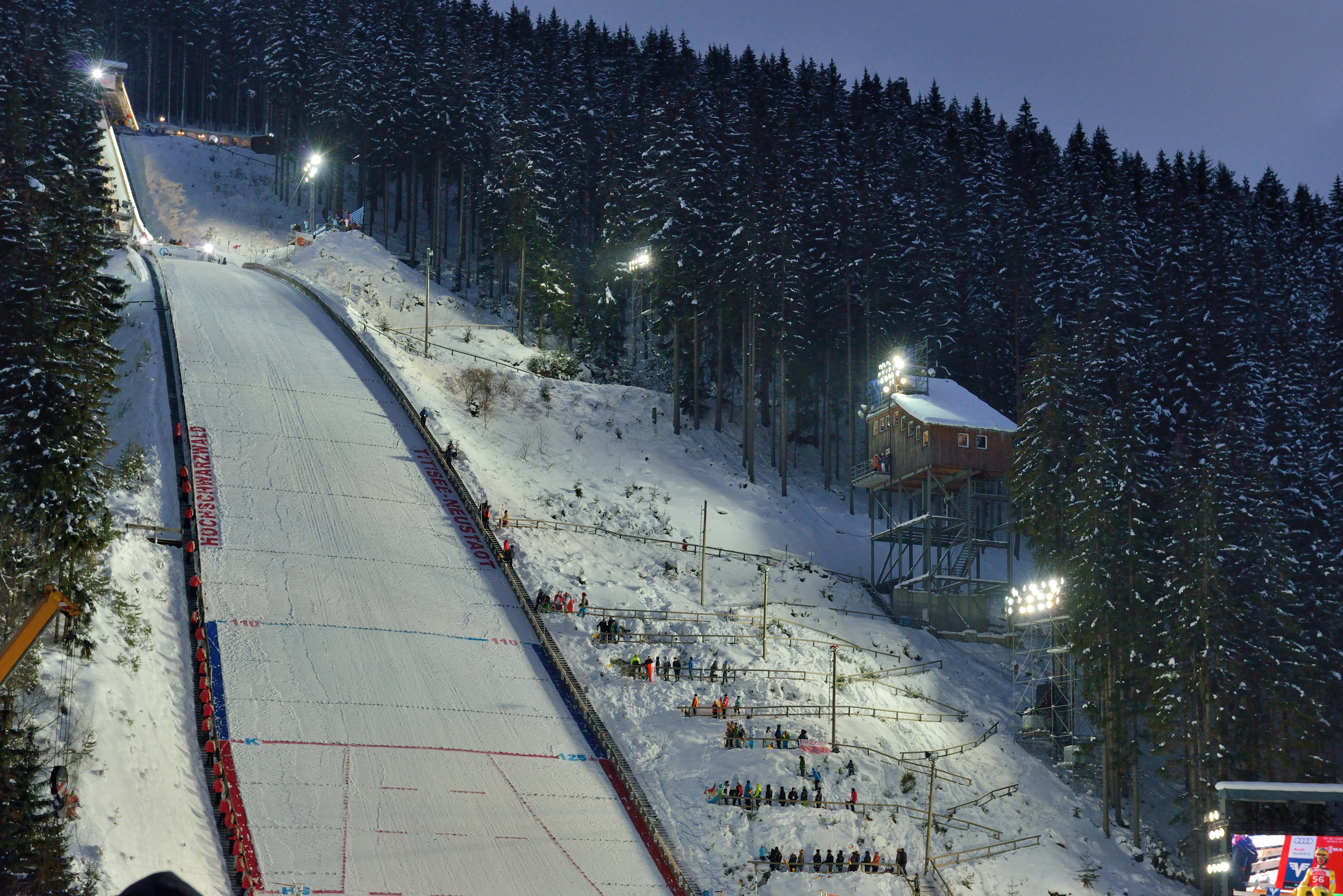
The Hochfirstschanze at night

== See also ==
- FIS Ski Flying World Cup
- List of ski jumping hills
