= List of FIS Ski Jumping World Cup team events =

This is full list of FIS Ski Jumping World Cup team events winners and medalists in ski jumping and ski flying.

== Full list ==
FIS Team Tour
Raw Air
Planica7
PolSKI Tour

=== Men's team ===
Num	Season	Date	Place	Hill	Size	Winner	Second	Third
1	1991/92	12 January 1992	(Italy) Predazzo	Trampolino dal Ben K120	LH	Austria	Finland	Switzerland
2	1991/92	28 March 1992	(Slovenia) Planica	Bloudkova velikanka K120	LH	Austria	Germany	Finland
3	1992/93	24 January 1993	(Italy) Predazzo	Trampolino dal Ben K120	LH	Austria	Germany	Japan
4	1992/93	27 March 1993	(Slovenia) Planica	Bloudkova velikanka K120	LH	Japan	Norway	Slovenia
5	1993/94	5 March 1994	(Finland) Lahti	Salpausselkä K114	LH	Austria	Japan	Norway
6	1993/94	25 March 1994	(Canada) Thunder Bay	Big Thunder K120	LH	Germany	Austria	Norway
	1994/95	18 December 1994	(France) Courchevel	Tremplin du Praz K120	LH	lack of snow		
7	1994/95	28 January 1995	(Finland) Lahti	Salpausselkä K114	LH	Finland	Austria	Japan
8	1995/96	9 December 1995	(Slovenia) Planica	Bloudkova velikanka K120	LH	Finland	Japan	Norway
9	1995/96	23 February 1996	(Norway) Trondheim	Granåsen K120	LH	Finland	Japan	Germany
10	1995/96	2 March 1996	(Finland) Lahti	Salpausselkä K114	LH	Japan	Germany	Austria
11	1995/96	15 March 1996	(Norway) Oslo	Holmenkollbakken K110	LH	Austria	Norway	Germany
12	1996/97	8 March 1997	(Finland) Lahti	Salpausselkä K114	LH	Finland	Austria	Norway
13	1998/99	30 January 1999	(Germany) Willingen	Mühlenkopfschanze K120	LH	Japan	Austria	Germany
14	1999/00	25 January 2000	(Japan) Hakuba	Olympic Hills K120	LH	Finland	Germany	Austria
15	1999/00	4 March 2000	(Finland) Lahti	Salpausselkä K116	LH	Finland	Austria	Germany
16	1999/00	18 March 2000	(Slovenia) Planica	Velikanka bratov Gorišek K185	FH	Germany	Finland	Japan
17	2000/01	25 November 2000	(Finland) Kuopio	Puijo K120	LH	Norway	Austria	Finland
	2000/01	2 December 2000	(Norway) Lillehammer	Lysgårdsbakken K120	LH	rescheduled to Kuopio		
	2000/01	9 December 2000	(Czech Republic) Liberec	Ještěd A K120	LH	cancelled		
18	2000/01	19 January 2001	(United States) Park City	Utah Olympic Park K120	LH	Japan	Finland	Austria
19	2000/01	2 February 2001	(Germany) Willingen	Mühlenkopfschanze K120	LH	Finland	Austria	Japan
20	2000/01	17 March 2001	(Slovenia) Planica	Letalnica bratov Gorišek K185	FH	Finland	Austria	Japan
21	2001/02	9 December 2001	(Austria) Villach	Villacher Alpenarena K90	NH	Finland	Japan	Poland
22	2001/02	13 January 2002	(Germany) Willingen	Mühlenkopfschanze K120	LH	Austria	Finland	Germany
23	2001/02	27 January 2002	(Japan) Sapporo	Ōkurayama K120	LH	Austria	Japan	Finland
24	2001/02	2 March 2002	(Finland) Lahti	Salpausselkä K116	LH	Finland	Slovenia	Germany
25	2001/02	23 March 2002	(Slovenia) Planica	Letalnica bratov Gorišek K185	FH	Finland	Germany	Austria
26	2002/03	8 March 2003	(Norway) Oslo	Holmenkollbakken K115	LH	Austria	Finland	Germany
27	2002/03	21 March 2003	(Slovenia) Planica	Letalnica bratov Gorišek K185	FH	Finland	Norway	Austria
28	2003/04	15 February 2004	(Germany) Willingen	Mühlenkopfschanze K130	LH	Norway	Finland	Germany
29	2003/04	6 March 2004	(Finland) Lahti	Salpausselkä K116	LH	Norway	Finland	Japan
30	2004/05	8 January 2005	(Germany) Willingen	Mühlenkopfschanze HS145	LH	Germany	Finland	Austria
31	2004/05	12 February 2005	(Italy) Pragelato	Stadio del Trampolino HS140	LH	Austria	Slovenia	Germany
32	2004/05	5 March 2005	(Finland) Lahti	Salpausselkä HS130	LH	Norway	Finland	Austria
33	2005/06	5 February 2006	(Germany) Willingen	Mühlenkopfschanze HS145	LH	Finland	Austria	Norway
34	2005/06	4 March 2006	(Finland) Lahti	Salpausselkä HS130	LH	Austria	Norway	Finland
35	2006/07	11 February 2007	(Germany) Willingen	Mühlenkopfschanze HS145	LH	Austria	Norway	Germany
36	2006/07	10 March 2007	(Finland) Lahti	Salpausselkä HS130	LH	Austria	Norway	Finland
37	2007/08	30 November 2007	(Finland) Kuusamo	Rukatunturi HS142	LH	Norway	Austria	Finland
38	2007/08	16 February 2008	(Germany) Willingen	Mühlenkopfschanze HS145	LH	Norway	Finland	Austria
	2007/08	1 March 2008	(Finland) Lahti	Salpausselkä HS130	LH	cancelled		
39	2007/08	15 March 2008	(Slovenia) Planica	Letalnica bratov Gorišek HS215	FH	Norway	Finland	Austria
	2008/09	28 November 2008	(Finland) Kuusamo	Rukatunturi HS142	LH	postponed to next day		
40	2008/09	29 November 2008	(Finland) Kuusamo	Rukatunturi HS142	LH	Finland	Austria	Germany
41	2008/09	7 February 2009	(Germany) Willingen	Mühlenkopfschanze HS145	LH	Austria	Norway	Finland
42	2008/09	15 February 2009	(Germany) Oberstdorf	Heini-Klopfer-Skiflugschanze HS213	FH	Finland	Russia	Austria
43	2008/09	7 March 2009	(Finland) Lahti	Salpausselkä HS130	LH	Austria	Finland	Norway
44	2008/09	14 March 2009	(Norway) Vikersund	Vikersundbakken HS207	FH	Austria	Finland	Norway
45	2008/09	21 March 2009	(Slovenia) Planica	Letalnica bratov Gorišek HS215	FH	Norway	Poland	Russia
46	2009/10	27 November 2009	(Finland) Kuusamo	Rukatunturi HS142	LH	Austria	Germany	Finland
47	2009/10	30 January 2010	(Germany) Oberstdorf	Heini-Klopfer-Skiflugschanze HS213	FH	Austria	Norway	Finland
48	2009/10	2 February 2010	(Germany) Willingen	Mühlenkopfschanze HS145	LH	Germany	Norway	Austria
49	2009/10	6 March 2010	(Finland) Lahti	Salpausselkä HS130	LH	Norway	Austria	Germany
50	2010/11	27 November 2010	(Finland) Kuusamo	Rukatunturi HS142	LH	Austria	Norway	Japan
51	2010/11	29 January 2011	(Germany) Willingen	Mühlenkopfschanze HS145	LH	Austria	Germany	Poland
52	2010/11	6 February 2011	(Germany) Oberstdorf	Heini-Klopfer-Skiflugschanze HS213	FH	Austria	Norway	Germany
53	2010/11	12 March 2011	(Finland) Lahti	Salpausselkä HS130	LH	Austria	Norway	Poland
54	2010/11	19 March 2011	(Slovenia) Planica	Letalnica bratov Gorišek HS215	FH	Austria	Norway	Slovenia
	2011/12	26 November 2011	(Finland) Kuusamo	Rukatunturi HS142	LH	postponed to next day		
55	2011/12	27 November 2011	(Finland) Kuusamo	Rukatunturi HS142	LH	Austria	Japan	Russia
56	2011/12	10 December 2011	(Czech Republic) Harrachov	Čerťák HS142	LH	Norway	Austria	Slovenia
57	2011/12	11 February 2012	(Germany) Willingen	Mühlenkopfschanze HS145	LH	Norway	Austria	Germany
58	2011/12	19 February 2012	(Germany) Oberstdorf	Heini-Klopfer-Skiflugschanze HS213	FH	Slovenia	Austria	Norway
	2011/12	3 March 2012	(Finland) Lahti	Salpausselkä HS130	LH	replaced with normal hill		
59	2011/12	3 March 2012	(Finland) Lahti	Salpausselkä HS97	NH	Austria	Germany	Poland
60	2011/12	17 March 2012	(Slovenia) Planica	Letalnica bratov Gorišek HS215	FH	Austria	Norway	Germany
61	2012/13	30 November 2012	(Finland) Kuusamo	Rukatunturi HS142	LH	Germany	Austria	Slovenia
62	2012/13	11 January 2013	(Poland) Zakopane	Wielka Krokiew HS134	LH	Slovenia	Poland	Austria
63	2012/13	9 February 2013	(Germany) Willingen	Mühlenkopfschanze HS145	LH	Slovenia	Norway	Germany
64	2012/13	17 February 2013	(Germany) Oberstdorf	Heini-Klopfer-Skiflugschanze HS213	FH	Norway	Austria	Slovenia
65	2012/13	9 March 2013	(Finland) Lahti	Salpausselkä HS130	LH	Germany	Norway	Poland
66	2012/13	23 March 2013	(Slovenia) Planica	Letalnica bratov Gorišek HS215	FH	Slovenia	Norway	Austria
67	2013/14	23 November 2013	(Germany) Klingenthal	Vogtland Arena HS140	LH	Slovenia	Germany	Japan
68	2013/14	18 January 2014	(Poland) Zakopane	Wielka Krokiew HS134	LH	Slovenia	Germany	Austria
69	2013/14	1 March 2014	(Finland) Lahti	Salpausselkä HS130	LH	Austria	Germany	Norway
70	2013/14	22 March 2014	(Slovenia) Planica	Bloudkova velikanka HS139	LH	Austria	Poland	Norway
71	2014/15	22 November 2014	(Germany) Klingenthal	Vogtland Arena HS140	LH	Germany	Japan	Norway
72	2014/15	17 January 2015	(Poland) Zakopane	Wielka Krokiew HS134	LH	Germany	Austria	Slovenia
73	2014/15	31 January 2015	(Germany) Willingen	Mühlenkopfschanze HS145	LH	Slovenia	Germany	Norway
74	2014/15	7 March 2015	(Finland) Lahti	Salpausselkä HS130	LH	Norway	Germany	Japan
75	2014/15	21 March 2015	(Slovenia) Planica	Letalnica bratov Gorišek HS225	FH	Slovenia	Austria	Norway
76	2015/16	21 November 2015	(Germany) Klingenthal	Vogtland Arena HS140	LH	Germany	Slovenia	Austria
77	2015/16	9 January 2016	(Germany) Willingen	Mühlenkopfschanze HS145	LH	Germany	Norway	Austria
78	2015/16	23 January 2016	(Poland) Zakopane	Wielka Krokiew HS134	LH	Norway	Austria	Poland
79	2015/16	6 February 2016	(Norway) Oslo	Holmenkollbakken HS134	LH	Slovenia	Norway	Japan
	2015/16	20 February 2016	(Finland) Lahti	Salpausselkä HS130	LH	strong wind; rescheduled to Kuopio		
80	2015/16	22 February 2016	(Finland) Kuopio	Puijo HS127	LH	Norway	Germany	Japan
81	2015/16	19 March 2016	(Slovenia) Planica	Letalnica bratov Gorišek HS225	FH	Norway	Slovenia	Austria
82	2016/17	3 December 2016	(Germany) Klingenthal	Vogtland Arena HS140	LH	Poland	Germany	Austria
83	2016/17	21 January 2017	(Poland) Zakopane	Wielka Krokiew HS134	LH	Germany	Poland	Slovenia
84	2016/17	28 January 2017	(Germany) Willingen	Mühlenkopfschanze HS145	LH	Poland	Austria	Germany
85	2016/17	11 March 2017	(Norway) Oslo	Holmenkollbakken HS134	LH	Austria	Germany	Poland
86	2016/17	18 March 2017	(Norway) Vikersund	Vikersundbakken HS225	LH	Norway	Poland	Austria
87	2016/17	25 March 2017	(Slovenia) Planica	Letalnica bratov Gorišek HS225	FH	Norway	Germany	Poland
88	2017/18	18 November 2017	(Poland) Wisła	Malinka HS134	LH	Norway	Poland; Austria	
89	2017/18	25 November 2017	(Finland) Kuusamo	Rukatunturi HS142	LH	Norway	Germany	Japan
90	2017/18	9 December 2017	(Germany) Titisee-Neustadt	Hochfirstschanze HS142	LH	Norway	Poland	Germany
91	2017/18	27 January 2018	(Poland) Zakopane	Wielka Krokiew HS140	LH	Poland	Germany	Norway
92	2017/18	3 March 2018	(Finland) Lahti	Salpausselkä HS130	LH	Germany	Poland	Norway
93	2017/18	10 March 2018	(Norway) Oslo	Holmenkollbakken HS134	LH	Norway	Poland	Austria
94	2017/18	17 March 2018	(Norway) Vikersund	Vikersundbakken HS240	LH	Norway	Poland	Slovenia
95	2017/18	24 March 2018	(Slovenia) Planica	Letalnica bratov Gorišek HS240	FH	Norway	Germany	Slovenia
96	2018/19	17 November 2018	(Poland) Wisła	Malinka HS134	LH	Poland	Germany	Austria
97	2018/19	8 December 2018	(Germany) Titisee-Neustadt	Hochfirstschanze HS142	LH	Germany	Austria	Poland
98	2018/19	19 January 2019	(Poland) Zakopane	Wielka Krokiew HS140	LH	Austria	Germany	Japan
99	2018/19	9 February 2019	(Finland) Lahti	Salpausselkä HS130	LH	Poland	Germany	Slovenia
100	2018/19	9 March 2019	(Norway) Oslo	Holmenkollbakken HS134	LH	Norway	Japan	Austria
101	2018/19	16 March 2019	(Norway) Vikersund	Vikersundbakken HS240	FH	Slovenia	Germany	Austria
102	2018/19	23 March 2019	(Slovenia) Planica	Letalnica bratov Gorišek HS240	FH	Poland	Germany	Slovenia
103	2019/20	23 November 2019	(Poland) Wisła	Malinka HS134	LH	Austria	Norway	Poland
104	2019/20	14 December 2019	(Germany) Klingenthal	Hochfirstschanze HS142	LH	Poland	Austria	Japan
105	2019/20	25 January 2020	(Poland) Zakopane	Wielka Krokiew HS140	LH	Germany	Norway	Slovenia
106	2019/20	29 February 2020	(Finland) Lahti	Salpausselkä HS130	LH	Germany	Slovenia	Austria
107	2019/20	7 March 2020	(Norway) Oslo	Holmenkollbakken HS134	LH	Norway	Germany	Slovenia
	2019/20	14 March 2020	(Norway) Vikersund	Vikersundbakken HS240	FH	coronavirus pandemic		
108	2020/21	21 November 2020	(Poland) Wisła	Malinka HS134	LH	Austria	Germany	Poland
109	2020/21	16 January 2021	(Poland) Zakopane	Wielka Krokiew HS140	LH	Austria	Poland	Norway
110	2020/21	23 February 2021	(Finland) Lahti	Salpausselkä HS130	LH	Norway	Poland	Germany
	2020/21	13 March 2021	(Norway) Oslo	Holmenkollbakken HS134	LH	coronavirus pandemic		
	2020/21	20 March 2021	(Norway) Vikersund	Vikersundbakken HS240	FH	coronavirus pandemic		
	2020/21	27 March 2021	(Slovenia) Planica	Letalnica bratov Gorišek HS240	FH	strong wind; rescheduled on 28 March 2021		
111	2020/21	28 March 2021	(Slovenia) Planica	Letalnica bratov Gorišek HS240	FH	Germany	Japan	Austria
112	2021/22	4 December 2021	(Poland) Wisła	Malinka HS134	LH	Austria	Germany	Slovenia
113	2021/22	9 January 2022	(Austria) Bischofshofen	Paul-Ausserleitner-Schanze HS142	LH	Austria	Japan	Norway
114	2021/22	15 January 2022	(Poland) Zakopane	Wielka Krokiew HS140	LH	Slovenia	Germany	Japan
115	2021/22	26 February 2022	(Finland) Lahti	Salpausselkä HS130	LH	Austria	Slovenia	Germany
116	2021/22	26 March 2022	(Slovenia) Planica	Letalnica bratov Gorišek HS240	FH	Slovenia	Norway	Austria
117	2022/23	14 January 2023	(Poland) Zakopane	Wielka Krokiew HS140	LH	Austria	Poland	Germany
118	2022/23	25 March 2023	(Finland) Lahti	Salpausselkä HS130	LH	Austria	Slovenia	Poland
119	2022/23	1 April 2023	(Slovenia) Planica	Letalnica bratov Gorišek HS240	FH	Austria	Slovenia	Norway
120	2023/24	20 January 2024	(Poland) Zakopane	Wielka Krokiew HS140	LH	Austria	Slovenia	Germany
121	2023/24	2 March 2024	(Finland) Lahti	Salpausselkä HS130	LH	Norway	Austria	Germany
122	2023/24	23 March 2024	(Slovenia) Planica	Letalnica bratov Gorišek HS240	FH	Austria	Slovenia	Norway
123	2024/25	18 January 2025	(Poland) Zakopane	Wielka Krokiew HS140	LH	Austria	Slovenia	Norway
124	2024/25	29 March 2025	(Slovenia) Planica	Letalnica bratov Gorišek HS240	FH	Austria	Germany	Slovenia
125	2025/26	28 March 2026	(Slovenia) Planica	Letalnica bratov Gorišek HS240	FH	Austria	Japan	Norway
126	2026/27	11 December 2026	(Germany) Titisee-Neustadt	Hochfirstschanze HS142	LH			
127	2026/27	16 January 2027	(Poland) Zakopane	Wielka Krokiew HS140	LH			
128	2026/27	13 March 2027	(Finland) Lahti	Salpausselkä HS130	LH			
129	2026/27	20 March 2027	(Slovenia) Planica	Letalnica bratov Gorišek HS240	FH			

=== Women's team ===
Num	Season	Date	Place	Hill	Size	Winner	Second	Third
1	2017/18	17 December 2017	(Germany) Hinterzarten	Rothaus-Schanze HS108	NH	Japan	Russia	France
2	2017/18	20 January 2018	(Japan) Zaō	Yamagata HS102	NH	Japan	Slovenia	Russia
3	2018/19	19 January 2019	(Japan) Zaō	Yamagata HS102	NH	Germany	Austria	Japan
4	2018/19	9 February 2019	(Slovenia) Ljubno	Savina Ski Jumping Center HS94	NH	Germany	Slovenia	Austria
5	2019/20	18 January 2020	(Japan) Zaō	Yamagata HS102	NH	Austria	Japan	Norway
6	2019/20	22 February 2020	(Slovenia) Ljubno	Savina Ski Jumping Center HS94	NH	Austria	Slovenia	Norway
7	2020/21	23 January 2021	(Slovenia) Ljubno	Savina Ski Jumping Center HS94	NH	Slovenia	Norway	Austria
8	2020/21	28 March 2021	(Russia) Chaykovsky	Snezhinka HS102	NH	Austria	Slovenia	Germany
9	2021/22	26 February 2022	(Austria) Hinzenbach	Aigner-Schanze HS90	NH	Austria	Russia	Slovenia

=== Mixed ===
Num	Season	Date	Place	Hill	Size	Winner	Second	Third
1	2012/13	23 November 2012	(Norway) Lillehammer	Lysgårdsbakken HS100	NH	Norway	Japan	Italy
2	2013/14	6 December 2013	(Norway) Lillehammer	Lysgårdsbakken HS100	NH	Japan	Austria	Norway
3	2020/21	21 February 2021	(Romania) Râșnov	Trambulina Valea Cărbunării HS97	NH	Norway	Slovenia	Austria
4	2021/22	28 January 2022	(Germany) Willingen	Mühlenkopfschanze HS147	LH	Slovenia	Norway	Austria
5	2021/22	4 March 2022	(Norway) Oslo	Holmenkollbakken HS134	LH	Slovenia	Austria	Norway
6	2022/23	10 December 2022	(Germany) Titisee-Neustadt	Mühlenkopfschanze HS142	LH	Austria	Germany	Norway
7	2022/23	3 February 2023	(Germany) Willingen	Mühlenkopfschanze HS147	LH	Norway	Austria	Germany
8	2024/25	22 November 2024	(Norway) Lillehammer	Lysgårdsbakken HS140	LH	Germany	Norway	Austria
9	2024/25	31 January 2025	(Germany) Willingen	Mühlenkopfschanze HS147	LH	Norway	Austria	Germany
10	2024/25	8 February 2025	(United States) Lake Placid	MacKenzie Intervale HS128	LH	Germany	Norway	Austria
11	2025/26	21 November 2025	(Norway) Lillehammer	Lysgårdsbakken HS140	LH	Japan	Slovenia	Austria
12	2025/26	30 January 2026	(Germany) Willingen	Mühlenkopfschanze HS147	LH	Slovenia	Germany	Japan
13	2026/27	20 November 2026	(Norway) Lillehammer	Lysgårdsbakken HS140	LH	Norway	Japan	Austria
14	2026/27	22 January 2027	(Norway) Sapporo	Okurayama HS137	LH			
15	2026/27	29 January 2027	(Germany) Willingen	Mühlenkopfschanze HS147	LH			
17	2026/27	7 February 2027	(United States) Lake Placid	MacKenzie Int. HS128	LH			

=== Women's super team ===
Num	Season	Date	Place	Hill	Size	Winner	Second	Third
1	2022/23	14 January 2023	(Japan) Zaō	Yamagata HS102	NH	Austria	Norway	Germany
2	2023/24	20 January 2024	(Japan) Zaō	Yamagata HS102	NH	Slovenia	Canada	Austria
3	2024/25	25 January 2025	(Japan) Zaō	Yamagata HS102	NH	Germany	Norway	Austria

=== Men's super team ===
Num	Season	Date	Place	Hill	Size	Winner	Second	Third
1	2022/23	11 February 2023	(United States) Lake Placid	MacKenzie Intervale Ski Jump HS128	LH	Poland	Austria	Japan
2	2022/23	19 February 2023	(Romania) Râșnov	Trambulina Valea Cărbunării HS97	NH	Germany	Slovenia	Austria
3	2023/24	13 January 2024	(Poland) Wisła	Malinka HS134	LH	Slovenia	Austria	Germany
4	2023/24	10 February 2024	(United States) Lake Placid	MacKenzie Intervale Ski Jump HS128	LH	Austria	Germany	Norway
5	2023/24	23 February 2024	(Germany) Oberstdorf	Heini-Klopfer HS235	FH	Slovenia	Norway	Austria
6	2024/25	13 December 2024	(Germany) Titisee-Neu.	Mühlenkopfschanze HS142	LH	Germany	Austria	Norway
7	2024/25	23 March 2025	(Finland) Lahti	Salpausselkä HS130	LH	Slovenia	Austria	Japan
8	2025/26	10 January 2026	(Poland) Zakopane	Wielka Krokiew HS140	LH	Austria	Slovenia	Poland
9	2025/26	8 March 2026	(Finland) Lahti	Salpausselkä HS130	LH	Austria	Slovenia	Finland

== Nations Cup ==
=== Men ===
Season	Winner	Runner-up	Third
1979/80	Austria	Norway	Japan
1980/81	Austria	Norway	Finland
1981/82	Austria	Norway	Finland
1982/83	Norway	Finland	Austria
1983/84	Finland	East Germany	Czechoslovakia
1984/85	Finland	Austria	Norway
1985/86	Austria	Finland	Norway
1986/87	Norway	Finland	Austria
1987/88	Finland	Czechoslovakia	Norway
1988/89	Norway	Finland	Austria
1989/90	Austria	Czechoslovakia	Finland
1990/91	Austria	Germany	Finland
1991/92	Austria	Finland	Czechoslovakia
1992/93	Austria	Japan	Norway
1993/94	Norway	Japan	Austria
1994/95	Finland	Austria	Japan
1995/96	Finland	Japan	Austria
1996/97	Japan	Norway	Finland
1997/98	Japan	Austria	Germany
1998/99	Japan (3)	Germany	Austria
1999/00	Finland	Austria	Germany
2000/01	Finland (7)	Austria	Germany
2001/02	Germany	Austria	Finland
2002/03	Austria	Finland	Norway
2003/04	Norway	Finland	Austria
2004/05	Austria	Finland	Norway
2005/06	Austria	Norway	Finland
2006/07	Austria	Norway	Switzerland
2007/08	Austria	Norway	Finland
2008/09	Austria	Finland	Norway
2009/10	Austria	Norway	Germany
2010/11	Austria	Norway	Poland
2011/12	Austria	Norway	Germany
2012/13	Norway	Austria	Germany
2013/14	Austria (18)	Germany	Slovenia
2014/15	Germany (2)	Norway	Austria
2015/16	Norway (7)	Slovenia	Germany
2016/17	Poland	Austria	Germany
2017/18	Norway (8)	Germany	Poland
2018/19	Poland (2)	Germany	Japan
2019/20	Germany (3)	Austria	Norway
2020/21	Norway (9)	Poland	Germany
2021/22	Austria (19)	Slovenia	Germany
2022/23	Austria (20)	Norway	Slovenia
2023/24	Austria (21)	Slovenia	Germany
2024/25	Austria (22)	Germany	Norway
2025/26	Austria (23)	Germany	

=== Women ===
Season	Winner	Runner-up	Third
2011/12	United States	Germany	Japan
2012/13	United States	Slovenia	Japan
2013/14	Japan	Germany	Slovenia
2014/15	Austria	Japan	Germany
2015/16	Austria	Japan	Slovenia
2016/17	Japan	Germany	Slovenia
2017/18	Germany	Japan	Norway
2018/19	Germany	Norway	Austria
2019/20	Austria	Norway	Japan
2020/21	Austria	Slovenia	Norway
2021/22	Slovenia	Austria	Japan
2022/23	Austria	Germany	Norway
2023/24	Austria	Slovenia	Japan
2024/25	Germany	Norway	Austria
2025/26	Japan	Norway	Slovenia

== Stats ==
=== Individual team wins ===
(includes team, super team & mixed-team events)

Rank		Team wins
1	(Austria) Stefan Kraft	18
2	(Austria) Gregor Schlierenzauer	17
3	(Austria) Thomas Morgenstern	16
4	(Austria) Andreas Kofler	15
5	(Norway) Johann André Forfang	14
6	(Norway) Daniel-André Tande	13
7	(Slovenia) Peter Prevc	12
	(Austria) Michael Hayböck	12
	(Austria) Jan Hörl	12

=== Men's team ===
Rank	after 125 events	1st	2nd	3rd	Total
1	Austria	43	25	26	94
2	Norway	28	22	21	71
3	Germany	16	30	23	69
4	Finland	15	13	9	37
5	Slovenia	12	11	15	38
6	Poland	7	13	12	32
7	Japan	4	11	15	30
8	Russia	0	1	2	3
9	Switzerland	0	0	1	1

=== Men's super team ===
Rank	after 9 events	1st	2nd	3rd	Total
1	Austria	3	4	2	9
2	Slovenia	3	3	0	6
3	Germany	2	1	1	4
4	Poland	1	0	1	2
5	Norway	0	1	2	3
6	Japan	0	0	2	2
7	Finland	0	0	1	1

=== Women's team ===
Rank	after 9 events	1st	2nd	3rd	Total
1	Austria	4	1	2	7
2	Japan	2	1	1	4
3	Germany	2	0	1	3
4	Slovenia	1	4	1	6
5	Russia	0	2	1	3
6	Norway	0	1	2	3
7	France	0	0	1	1

=== Mixed team ===
Rank	after 13 events	1st	2nd	3rd	Total
1	Norway	5	3	3	11
2	Slovenia	3	2	0	5
3	Austria	1	4	6	11
4	Germany	2	2	2	6
5	Japan	2	2	1	5
6	Italy	0	0	1	1

=== Women's super team ===
Rank	after 3 event	1st	2nd	3rd	Total
1	Austria	1	0	2	3
2	Germany	1	0	1	2
3	Slovenia	1	0	0	1
4	Norway	0	2	0	2
5	Canada	0	1	0	1

- updated: 20 November 2026
