= Ulm (disambiguation) =

Ulm is a city in Germany.

Ulm may also refer to:

- Free Imperial City of Ulm (1181–1803), a State of the Holy Roman Empire
- Ulm zu Renchen, a village in Renchen, Germany
- Battle of Ulm, a battle which took place there in 1805 during the Napoleonic wars
- University of Ulm
- Ulm School of Design, an influential school that existed from 1953 to 1968
- Ulm, a village in Cerbăl Commune, Hunedoara County, Romania
- Ulm, Arkansas, United States
- Ulm, Montana, United States
- Charles Ulm (1898–1934), pioneer Australian aviator
- Stefan Ulm (born 1975), five-time world champion and two-time Olympic silver medalist in sprint canoeing
- David Ulm (born 1984), French football player
- the nickname of the École Normale Supérieure college in Paris, located on the rue d'Ulm (which is named after the battle)

ULM may stand for:

- University of Louisiana at Monroe
  - The school's athletic program, the ULM Warhawks or Louisiana–Monroe Warhawks
- Universitas Lambung Mangkurat, Indonesian public university located in South Kalimantan, Indonesia
- IATA and FAA codes for New Ulm Municipal Airport
- In ultralight aviation, ultralight/microlight aircraft
- Uzboi-Landon-Morava, an outflow basin on Mars

== See also ==
- New Ulm (disambiguation)
