= Ulmer =

Ulmer is a German surname meaning "from Ulm". Notable people with the surname include:

- Al Ulmer (1916–2000), American intelligence officer
- Andreas Ulmer (born 1985), Austrian footballer
- Christian Ulmer (born 1984), German ski jumper
- Edgar G. Ulmer (1904–1972), Austrian-American film director
- Fran Ulmer (born 1947), first woman elected as Lieutenant Governor of Alaska
- Georg Ulmer (1877–1963), German entomologist
- Gregory Ulmer (born 1944), professor of English and of Electronic Languages and Cybermedia
- James Blood Ulmer (1940–2026), American jazz and blues guitarist and singer
- James Ulmer (journalist), entertainment journalist
- Jason Ulmer (born 1978), Canadian ice hockey player
- Jeff Ulmer (born 1977), Canadian ice hockey player
- Jeffery Ulmer (born 1966), American sociologist
- Kristen Ulmer (born 1966), American extreme skier
- L. C. Ulmer (1928–2016), American delta blues musician
- LaMonte Ulmer (born 1986), American basketball player
- Layne Ulmer (born 1980), Canadian ice hockey player
- Sarah Ulmer (born 1976), New Zealand cyclist and 2004 Olympic champion
- Shirley Ulmer (1914–2000), American screenwriter
- Thomas Ulmer (born 1956), German politician and Member of the European Parliament for Baden-Württemberg
- Walter F. Ulmer (born 1929), American Lieutenant General

== See also ==
- Ulmer, South Carolina, United States, a town
- Mount Ulmer, Ellsworth Mountains, Antarctica
- Familienbrauerei Bauhöfer, who brew several beers prefixed "Ulmer"
