= Ulam =

Ulam may refer to:

- ULAM, the ICAO airport code for Naryan-Mar Airport, Russia
- Ulam (surname)
- Ulam (salad), a type of Malay salad
- Ulam, a Filipino term loosely translated to viand or side dish; see Tapa (Filipino cuisine)
- Ulam, the language spoken by prehistoric humans in the movie Quest for Fire
- Ulam, the name of the porch of Solomon's Temple held up by the pillars
- Thalassognathus ulami, a Marine vertebrate from the phylum, Chordata, and class, Actinopterygii (ray-finned fishes). The Tribe - Local Name is Ulam (from Tagalog, meaning food or meat dish). It resembles a mix between an anglerfish and a barracuda.

== See also ==
- List of things named after Stanislaw Ulam
- Anglerfish
- Barracuda
- Deep-sea fish
