= Jon Aaraas =

Norwegian ski jumper (born 1986)

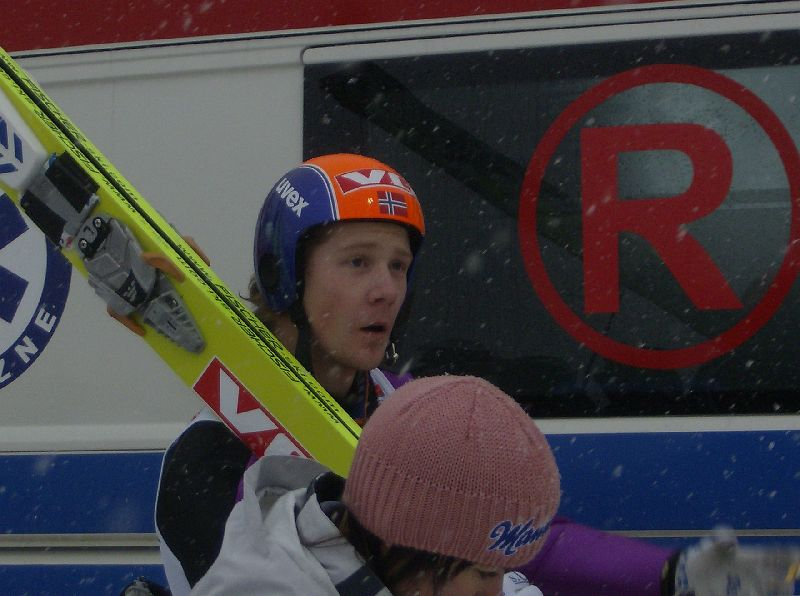

Personal information
- Full name: Jon Aaraas
- Born: 10 March 1986 (age 40) Oslo, Norway

Sport
- Sport: Skiing
- Club: Ready; Kollenhopp

World Cup career
- Seasons: 2005-2009
- Indiv. podiums: 0
- Indiv. wins: 0

Achievements and titles
- Personal best: 219 m
- Updated on 11 February 2011

Jon Aaraas (born 10 March 1986) is a retired Norwegian ski jumper. He debuted in the World Cup in 2005 in Pragelato, where he finished 26th. He was on the Norwegian Four Hills Tournament team in the 2006–07 World Cup. However, he competed mostly in the Continental Cup.

== Early life ==
Born in Oslo, he grew up in the neighborhood Holmenkollen, and was introduced to ski jumping in kindergarten by a father who had seen him jump there. He joined the sports club Ready, training under the regional ski jumping umbrella team Kollenhopp.

== Career ==
Aaraas made his debut in the Continental Cup, the second highest level of international ski jumping, with a fourteenth place in Seefeld on 1 January 2003. Around that time he was considered among the best junior ski jumpers in Norway, However, three days after Seefeld he only managed to finish 50th in Bischofshofen. He did not return to the Continental Cup until August the same year, and though his talent was lauded by coach Mika Kojonkoski, a series of mid-level results followed, never reaching the top ten except for a sixth place in Sapporo in January 2004. Nonetheless, he was included as a part of the national B team. In late 2004, he recorded a sixth place in Rovaniemi in December. This was followed by seven results among the top ten before the end of the 2004–05 season. He also made his debut in the World Cup with a 26th place in Pragelato in February, and later recorded a 48th place in Lillehammer in March. He was considered for a spot in the Norwegian 2005 World Ski Championships squad, but was not actually picked.

The 2005–06 season was not successful, however, with Aaraas not placing among the top ten in the Continental Cup, and not featuring at all in the World Cup. He failed to reach the 2006 Winter Olympics, which had been a declared goal for many years. In December 2006, though, he reached new lengths as he finished among the top eleven in three out of four Continental Cup races in Rovaniemi. For this, he was drafted onto the Norwegian team to compete in the Four Hills Tournament around New Year. He only actually qualified for one of the four races, that of Garmisch-Partenkirchen, but returned to the World Cup circuit for various events later that winter, including one ski flying event in Vikersundbakken.

The 2007–08 season saw Aaraas perform consistently well. He finished among the top four on four occasions in the Continental Cup, with second places from Villach in September and Kranj in January as the best result. Following this result, he had a World Cup run where he finished around 20th-30th six times in a row, with a nineteenth place from Zakopane as the best result. The 2008–09 season saw Aaraas mainly competing in the Continental Cup. He recorded four second places and two third places. In the 2008–09 World Cup he competed in five races and managed one 29th place as the best, in March 2009 in Kuopio. He did not compete in the World Cup anymore. In the 2009–10 Continental Cup he came in the top ten twice, but in the 2010–11 Continental Cup he only participated in two races in December 2010 in Vikersund. In a test race in the new ski flying hill in Vikersund in February 2011, Aaraas improved his personal best from 190 to 219 metres. He subsequently retired.
