= New Ulm =

New Ulm can mean:

- New Ulm, Minnesota, USA
- New Ulm, Texas, USA
- Neu-Ulm, a town in Bavaria, Germany
- Neu-Ulm (district) in Bavaria, Germany
