= Zaō Onsen =

Hot spring area in Yamagata Prefecture, Japan

Coordinates: 38°10′07″N 140°23′51″E

- Mount Zao Hot Springs
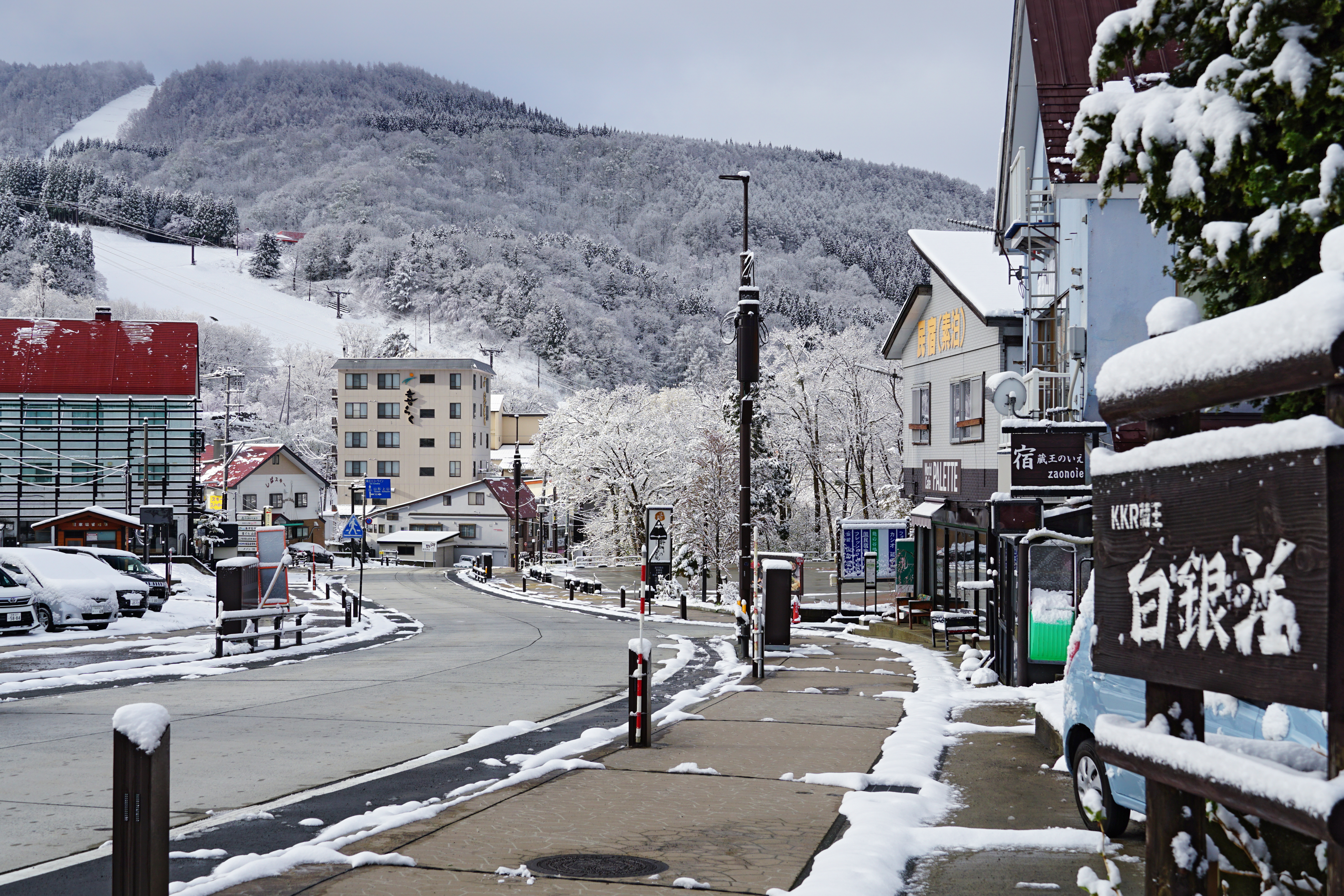
- Juhyo Street
- Interactive map of Zaō Onsen
- Location: Mount Zaō, Yamagata Prefecture, Japan
- Elevation: 880 meters above sea level
- Type: volcanic
- Temperature: 113 °F (45 °C)

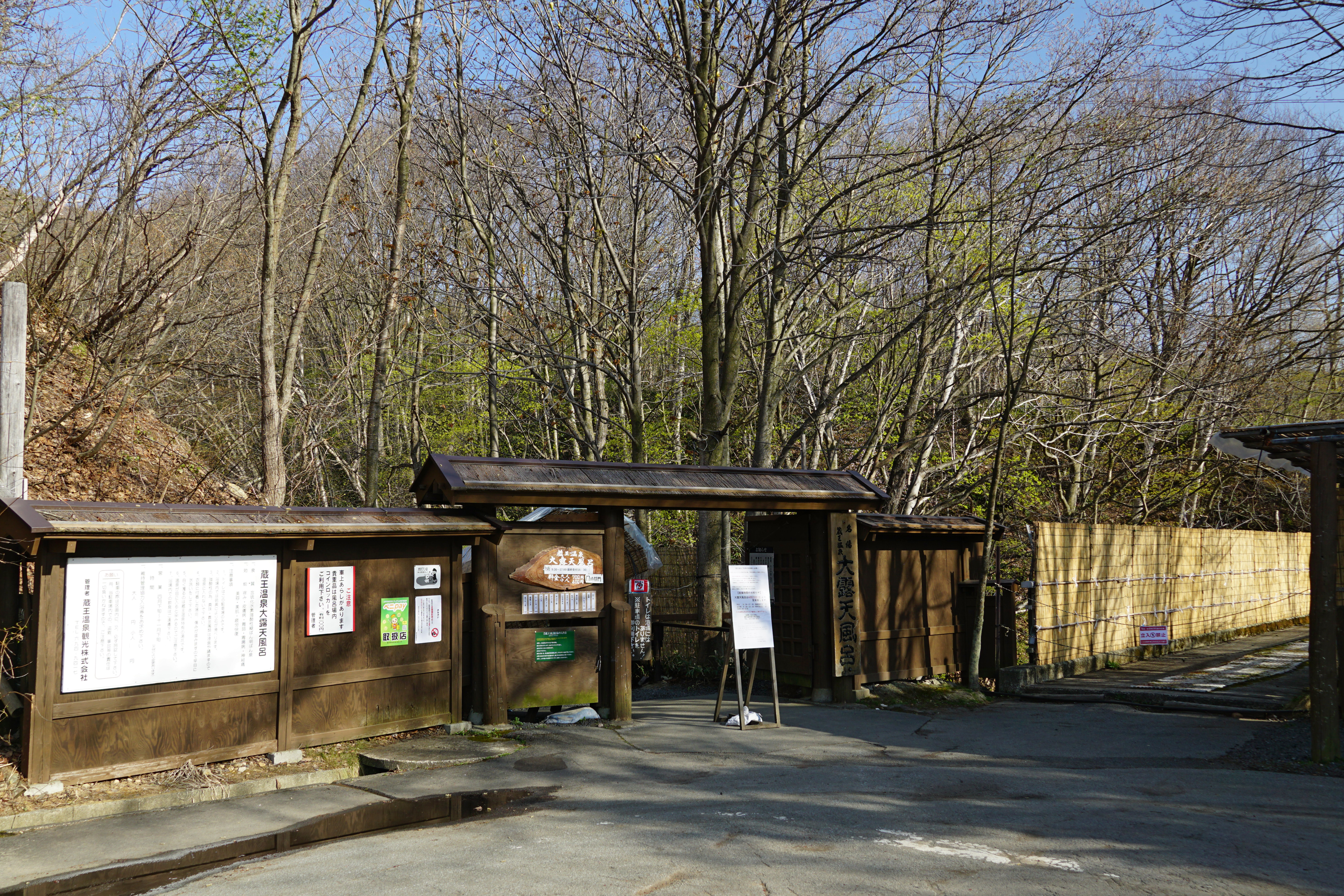
Entrance to large open air hot springs bath

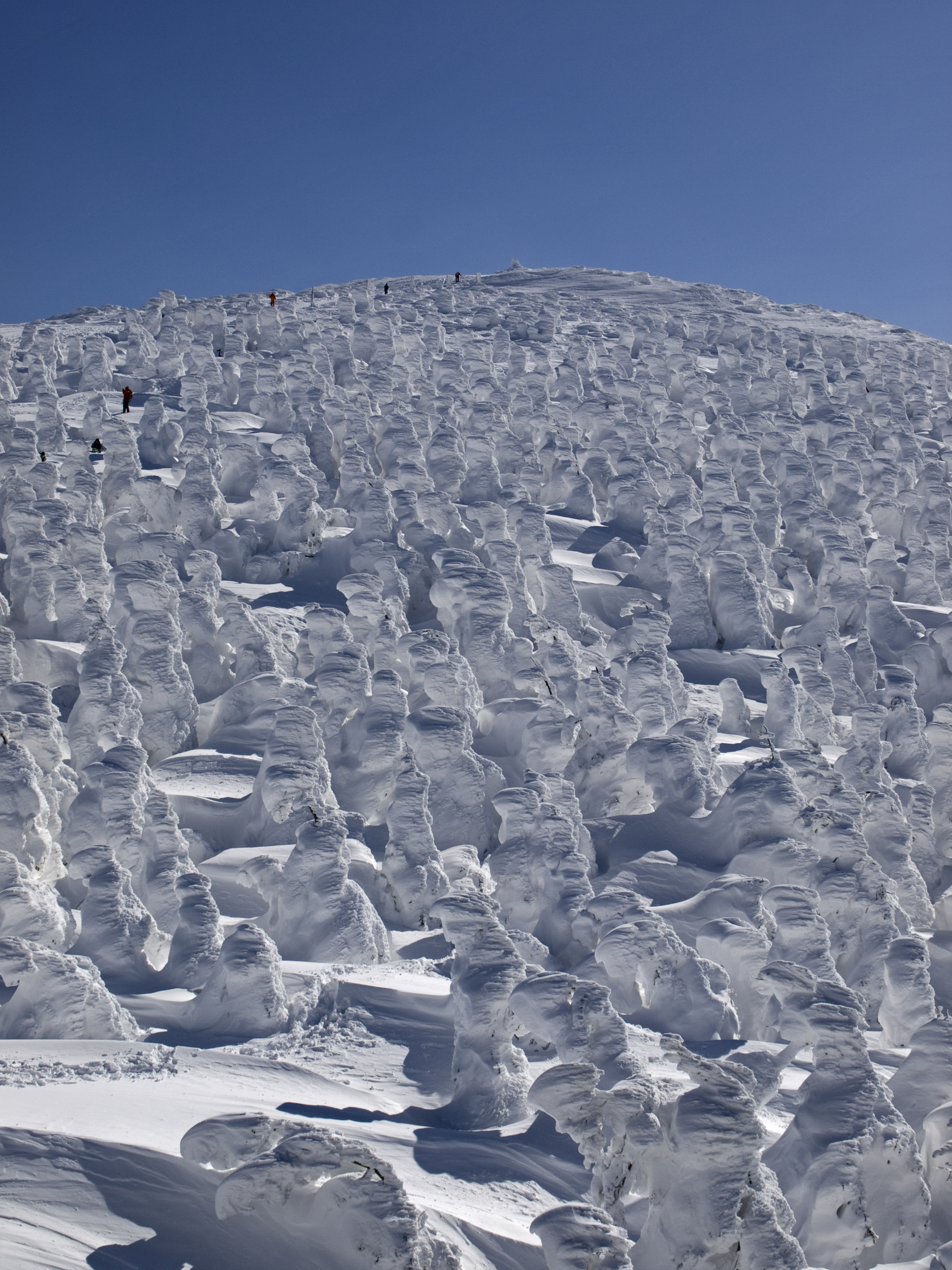
"Snow monsters" on Mount Zaō

Zaō Onsen (蔵王温泉) is a famous hot spring area on Mount Zaō in the northern part of Honshū, the main island of Japan.

== History ==
Records of the onsen date back as far as 110 AD. A wounded warrior is said to have drawn an arrow out of his body and cleaned the wound at a spring only to find that the injury healed miraculously quickly and well. It is known locally as "Springs of Beauty."

== Location ==
Zaō Onsen is located in the Mount Zaō stratovolcanic range. Although Mount Zaō stretches between Yamagata and Miyagi Prefectures, the town where Zaō Onsen is located was recently merged into Yamagata. The hot spring is accessible via the Tōhoku Expressway.

== Water profile ==
The hot mineral water has a high acid and sulfur content, giving it the characteristic smell of rotten eggs from the sulphur. Other minerals include iron, aluminum, sulfate and chloride. The water temperature at the open air public bathhouse is 113 °F/45 °C.

== Snow monster phenomenon ==
The Zao Mountain is known for its conifer trees which become encrusted and solidified by January due to the hard rime phenomenon, which is caused by heavy snow and winds of freezing temperatures. These formations are known as "snow monsters" or juhyo in Japanese. They are caused by the frigid storm winds of the Siberian jet stream.
