= Stephan Hocke =

German ski jumper

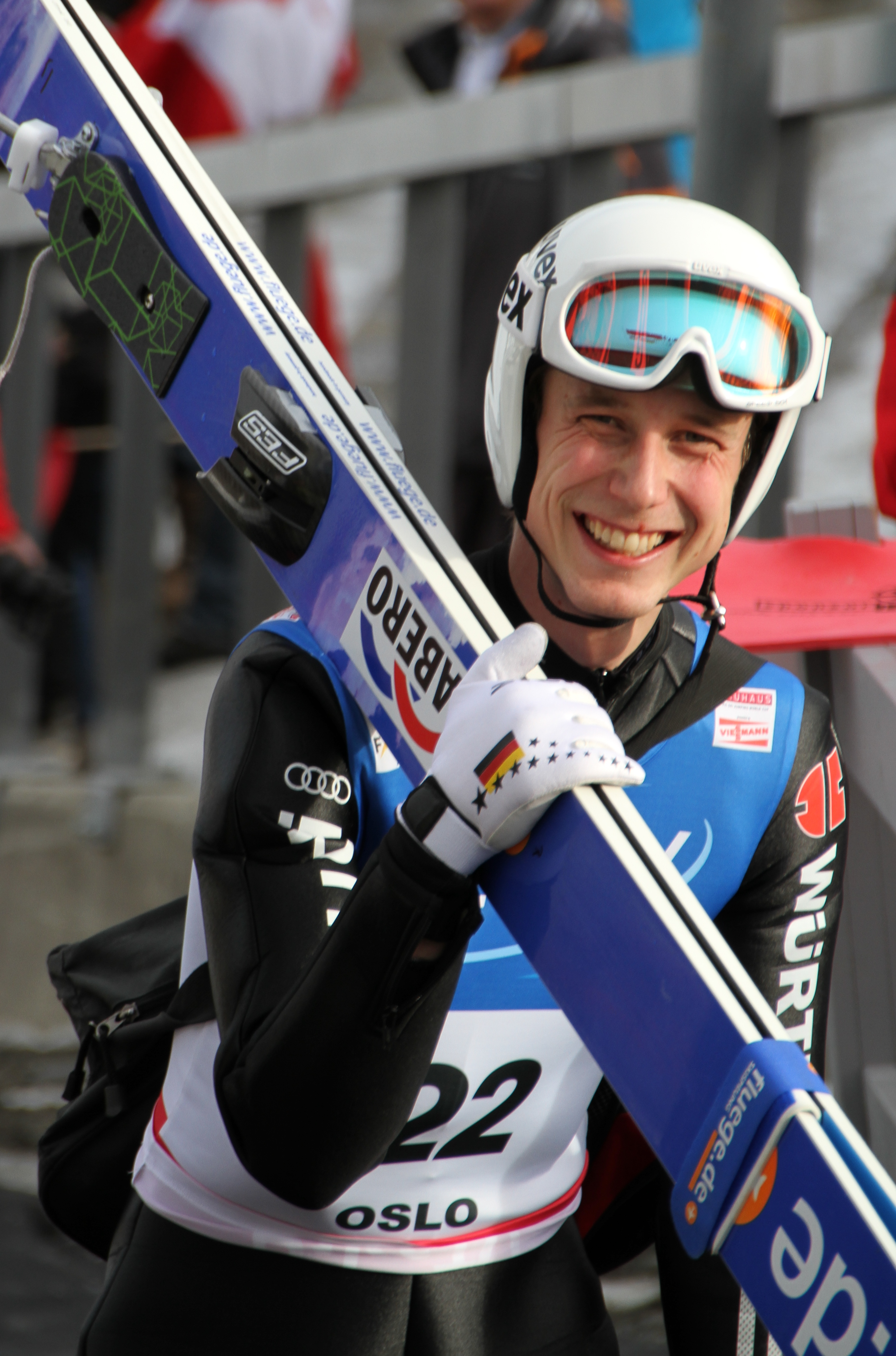
- Hocke in Oslo, 2012

Personal information
- Nationality: Germany
- Born: 20 October 1983 (age 42) Suhl, East Germany
- Height: 1.77 m (5 ft 10 in)

Sport
- Sport: Skiing

World Cup career
- Seasons: 2002–2012
- Indiv. starts: 150
- Indiv. podiums: 2
- Indiv. wins: 1
- Team starts: 8
- Team podiums: 4

Achievements and titles
- Personal bests: 208.5 m (684 ft); Planica, 20 March 2005
Medal record
Men's ski jumping
Olympic Games
Gold medal – first place	2002 Salt Lake City	Team LH
- Updated on 10 February 2016

Stephan Hocke (born 20 October 1983) is a German former ski jumper who competed from 2001 to 2012. In his debut World Cup season, he won a competition in Engelberg on 15 December 2001, which would be his only World Cup win. He also won a gold medal in the team large hill competition at the 2002 Winter Olympics in Salt Lake City.

== World Cup ==
=== Standings ===
Season	Overall	4H	SF	NT
2001/02	9	10	N/A	26
2002/03	52	38	N/A	—
2003/04	34	32	N/A	38
2004/05	27	49	N/A	22
2005/06	82	—	N/A	55
2006/07	65	—	N/A	43
2007/08	45	53	N/A	—
2008/09	32	15	51	37
2009/10	79	62	—	—
2010/11	31	25	—	N/A
2011/12	36	16	—	N/A

=== Wins ===
No.	Season	Date	Location	Hill	Size
1	2001/02	15 December 2001	(Switzerland) Engelberg	Gross-Titlis-Schanze K120	LH
