= Christian Ulmer =

German skier and ski jumper (born 1984)

Personal information
- Nickname: Ulmi
- Born: 19 August 1984 (age 42) Göppingen, West Germany

Sport
- Sport: Skiing
- Club: SC Wiesensteig

World Cup career
- Seasons: 2006-present
- Indiv. wins: 0
- Updated on 1 February 2009

Christian Ulmer (born 19 August 1984) is a German Nordic combined skier and ski jumper.

Having made his Continental Cup debut in January 2006, his best result is the victory from Bischofshofen in January 2009. He made his World Cup debut in November 2006 in Kuusamo, and his eighth place in that race is his best result so far.

He was born in Göppingen, and is studying Int. Management in Freiburg. His hobbies include snowboard and music.
