= Ondřej Vaculík =

Czech ski jumper (born 1986)

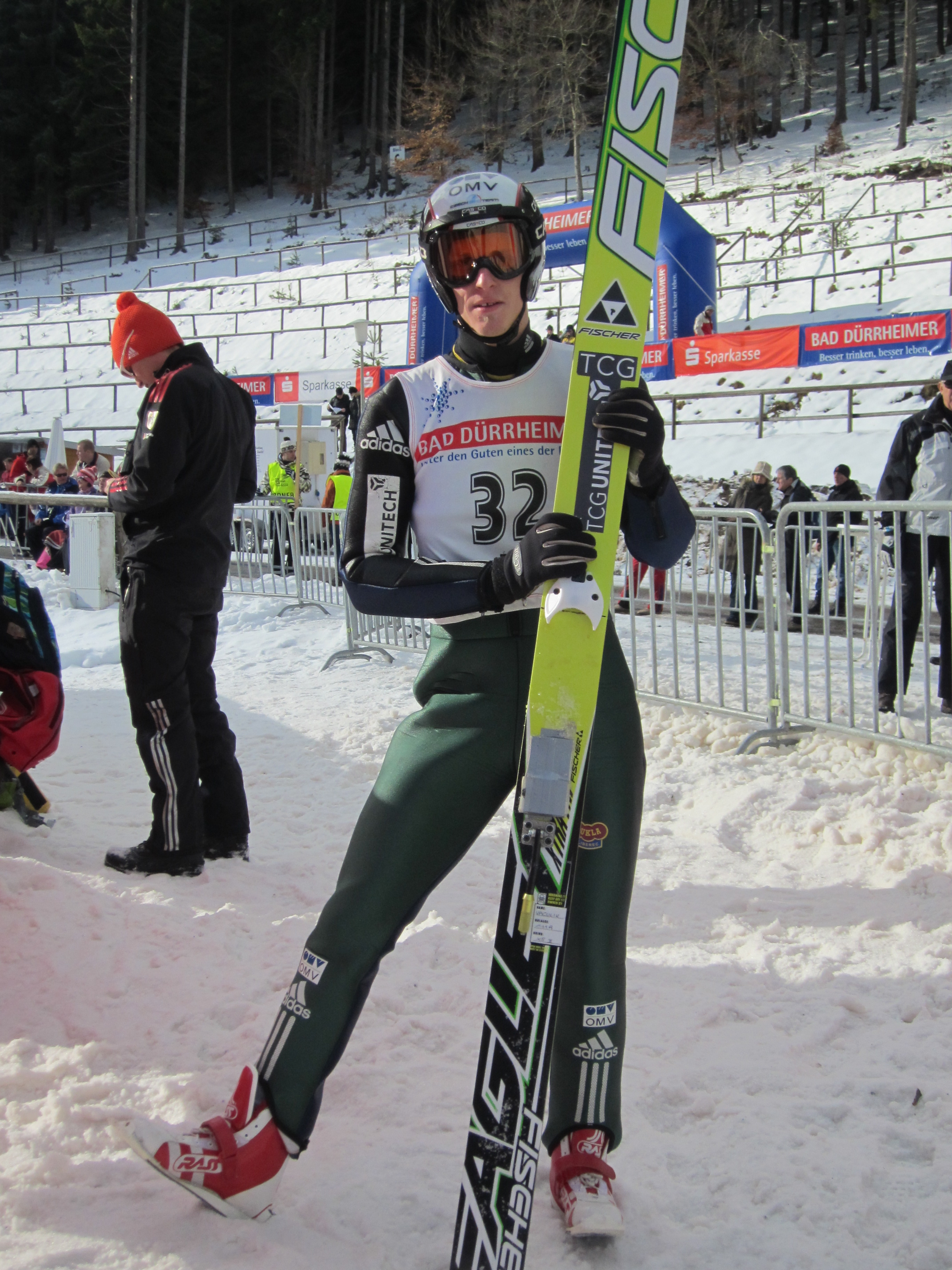
Ondřej Vaculík

Ondřej Vaculík (born 12 May 1986 in Jilemnice) is a Czech ski jumper who has competed since 2002. At the 2006 Winter Olympics in Turin, he finished ninth in the team large hill and 45th in the individual large hill events.

Vaculík finished 50th in the individual normal event at the 2007 FIS Nordic World Ski Championships in Sapporo. His best individual World cup finish was 28th in a large hill event in Japan in 2006.

Vaculík's best individual career finish was second in a Continental Cup normal hill event in Slovenia in 2007. Vaculik's summer season 08 have so far been very good.
