= Borek Sedlák =

Czech ski jumper

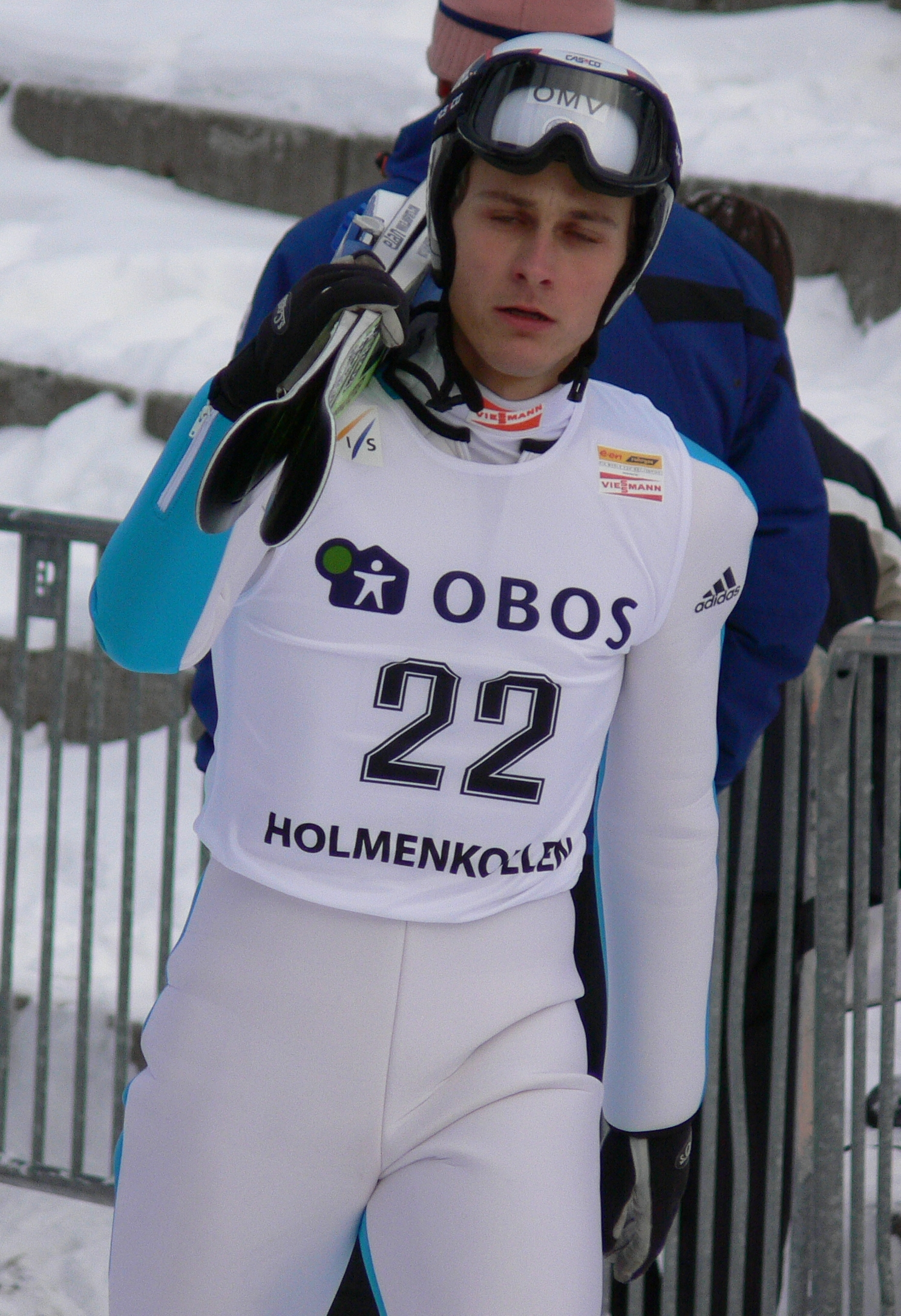
Borek Sedlák

Borek Sedlák (born Vlástibor, June 15, 1981) is a Czech former ski jumper and current Assistant Race Director of the FIS Ski Jumping World Cup. He competed from 2001 to 2014. At the 2006 Winter Olympics, he finished ninth in the team large hill and 38th in the individual normal hill events.

Sedlák's best individual World Cup finish was 17th in a large hill event in Liberec in 2008. His lone victory was in a Continental Cup normal event in Switzerland in 2005.

== Early life ==
Sedlák was born in Jablonec nad Nisou.
