= 2009–10 FIS Ski Jumping World Cup Individual Points Table =

Also see:

2009–10 FIS Ski Jumping World Cup

2009–10 FIS Ski Jumping World Cup Individual Results Table

Rk	Jumper	1	2	3	4	5	6	7	8	9	10	11	12	13	14	15	16	17	18	19	20	21	22	23	24	Pts
1.	S. Ammann (SUI)	22	22	100		100	80	100	45	60	80	60	80	45	45	100	80	80	50	100		100	100	100	100	1649
2.	G. Schlierenzauer (AUT)	12	100	50		80	100	40	29	100	100	40	45	100			100	100	36	60	100	50	24	80	22	1368
3.	T. Morgenstern (AUT)	11	80	10		60	32	40	60	29	18	100	22	16	100	1		60			50	60	45	45	45	944
4.	A. Kofler (AUT)	36	40	40		50	60	50	100	50	50	45	40	26			20	45		40	29	22	50	40	60	893
5.	A. Malysz (POL)		60	32		22	8	32	32	24	36	13	36	32			45	50	40	80		80	80	60	80	842
6.	W. Loitzl (AUT)	60	36	9		14	50	22	50	80	40	50	32	40			50	32	26	50		45	29	16	29	760
7.	A. Jacobsen (NOR)	45	0	0		1	13	16	7	45	45	26	0	20				36	100	36	80	0	60	11	16	557
8.	M. Koch (AUT)	24				24	36	29	26	22	13	32	60	50	32	60			45	24		5	9	14	40	545
9.	B. E. Romøren (NOR)	100	14	0		45	40	80	0	32	24	18	24	8			32	18	0	8	6			32	36	517
10.	R. Kranjec (SLO)	1	45	18		2	0	9	15	2	16	11	100	80			11	22	80	32		9	32	4	14	503
11.	J. Ahonen (FIN)	0	29			15	20	26	80	40	60	80	29	22			36	29	24			4				494
12.	M. Uhrmann (GER)	50	16	26		10	7	45	0	0	22	20	18	24			29	20	29	29	26	40	0	13	0	424
13.	D. Zauner (AUT)														29	29	40	40	22	45	32	26	40	50	50	403
14.	H. Olli (FIN)	0	50	80		36	4	7	14	16	7	24	0	60			1	0	0	0		36	13	8	11	367
15.	E. Chedal (FRA)	13	20	60		32	18	20	0	13	10	14	15	9			10	9	15		15	10	36	36	10	365
16.	D. Ito (JPN)	29	0			40	45	60	18	7	20	5			60	40						20	0	7	8	359
17.	N. Kasai (JPN)	26	0	1		20	16	0	20	20	29	12			40	80						24	15	29	12	344
18.	J. R. Evensen (NOR)	32	0	24		7	9	8	26	36	9	0	26	29			14	13	60		20			24	0	337
19.	P. Bodmer (GER)	80	18	45		6	24	15	22	15	32	29	10	11			0	8		11	10		0			336
20.	M. Neumayer (GER)	16	0	0		11	0	6	0	14	0	22	13	10	13	36			20	26	60	32	6	0	0	285
21.	A. Wank (GER)	0	15	29		5	11	0	0	11	0	0	1	3	80	45	26	16		10	7	0	0	0	0	259
22.	J. Janda (CZE)	6	5	20		13	0	11	5	18	0	0			0	24	24	26		16	36	16	7	9	20	256
23.	A. Hájek (CZE)												50	36	24	50	0		32			0	0	6	32	230
24.	K. Stoch (POL)	7	11	36		26	14	24		8	12	0					4	3				13	10	26	9	203
25.	S. Thurnbichler (AUT)								9	26	3	9	16	14	50	32	15	15	12	0	0					201
26.	T. Hilde (NOR)	5		7			32	1	0		0	4	11	7			0	0	14	14	45	11	16	0	13	180
27.	M. Hautamäki (FIN)	15	0	12					1	0	0	0	14	12			13	24	16			15	26	0	6	154
28.	D. Vassiliev (RUS)	0	13	11		29	22	13		12	15	36														151
29.	M. Schmitt (GER)	20	0	4		0	26	10	8	6	0	10								20	24	0	2	20	0	150
30.	R. Ljoekelsoey (NOR)		32	15		12	11	0	12	1	11	0	0	0								12	12	22	0	140
31.	J. Damjan (SLO)								36	10	0	8	4	0			16	11	3	18	18		0	3	7	134
32.	S. Tochimoto (JPN)	40	0	13		8	7	6	0		0	0			36	14						0	0	0		124
33.	A. Küttel (SUI)	0	24			18	0	18	3	0	0	0					22	12	6	7		1	0	0		111
34.	K. Keituri (FIN)	18				0	0		6	0	0	0	12	0			8	14	9	6		0	22	0	15	110
35.	P. Prevc (SLO)		9	0			5	4	0	3	0						18	5				14	18	12	18	106
36.	A. Bardal (NOR)		0												0	12	0	4	7	12	22	8	8	2	24	99
37.	S. Colloredo (ITA)			0		18	15	14	10	5	0	0	5	0			10	6			1	0	3	5	4	96
38.	F. Yumoto (JPN)	0	3					0				0			22	16				22	14	7	0		0	84
39.	M. Fettner (AUT)	15	0			0		0			5	0										18	0	18	26	82
39.	M. Innauer (AUT)										26	16			8	18	12	2								82
41.	Ł. Rutkowski (POL)	3	0	0			0	0					20	6	20	20	6	0	0			0	1	0	3	79
42.	S. Freund (GER)									0					0	22	5	10	8	4	12	0	14	0		75
43.	L. Müller (AUT)								40	9	0	3	6	13												71
44.	M. Meznar (SLO)	0	2	14		0	2	0	13	0	0	1	8	0			7	7				0	0	10	0	64
45.	K. Mietus (POL)	0	10	22		9	0	12	0	0			3	4			0									60
45.	A. Morassi (ITA)		0	6		3	0		0	0		0	9	18			0				13	0	11	0		60
47.	V. Descombes-Sevoie (FRA)	0		8			0	0										0	2		8	6	20	15		59
48.	L. Hlava (CZE)		7	3		0	1		16	4	0	2	0	0	15	8	0	0						0	0	56
49.	M. Hayboeck (AUT)										14	0									40					54
49.	J. Happonen (FIN)	10	0	5		0							0	5			0	0				29	5	0	0	54
49.	T. Takeuchi (JPN)	4		0		0	0	4	0	0	4				16	26						0	0	0	0	54
52.	B. Sedlak (CZE)												2	15				0	18	13	3					51
53.	J. Matura (CZE)					4	0	0	11	0									4	15	9	2	0		0	45
54.	G. Spaeth (GER)					0									26	15	0	1		0						42
55.	O. Muotka (FIN)														18	11				5	0	3	4	0	0	41
56.	A. Stjernen (NOR)		12												14	9	0	0							1	36
57.	P. Karelin (RUS)	0	8	2		0	0		0		8	15										0		1	0	34
58.	P. Pikl (SLO)	9	0			0	0	0							10	14			0	0						33
59.	M. Bachleda (POL)	0	4	16		0	0	0					0	1	4	7	0	0		0						32
60.	A. Fannemel (NOR)		26																							26
60.	D. Kornilov (RUS)		0	0		0		0	0	0	6	0	7	0			0	0	13			0	0	0	0	26
62.	M. Cikl (CZE)	0	0	0			12	0	4	0		7														23
63.	R. Koudelka (CZE)	8		0		0									12	0						0	0	0		20
63.	G. Mietus (POL)																0	0		9	11					20
63.	S. Hula (POL)					0	0	4	0	0	0	6	0	2	1	0	2					0	0	0	5	20
66.	Y. Sakano (JPN)														11	6										17
67.	V. Larinto (FIN)							0	0	0	0							0			16					16
68.	V. Shumbarets (UKR)	0				0	0	0	0	0					0	10	0	0		3						13
69.	V. Sklett (NOR)			0		0	0								0	0			11	0	0					11
69.	A. Kokkonen (NOR)		6												0	5										11
71.	J. Tepes (SLO)														0	0			10	0	0					10
71.	K. Sakuyama (JPN)														10	0										10
73.	K. Yoshioka (JPN)														3	5			1	0	0					9
74.	M. Mechler (GER)									0	0				0	3			5	0						8
75.	Y. Watase (JPN)														7				0	0	0					7
76.	D. Ipatov (RUS)			0											6			0					0			6
77.	K. Yliriesto (FIN)														5	0										5
77.	F. Schabereiter (AUT)																				5					5
79.	R. Hrgota (SLO)														0						4					4
80.	I. Rosliakov (RUS)		0			0	3	0		0	0				0	0	0	0				0	0			3
80.	S. Hocke (GER)								0						0	0	3	0	0							3
82.	N. Karpenko (KAZ)									0	2												0	0	0	2
82.	H. Kim (KOR)	0				0			2			0	0	0		0								0	0	2
82.	A. Higashi (JPN)														0					2	0					2
82.	T. Okabe (JPN)			0											2	0							0			2
82.	R. Dellasega (ITA)			0											0	2					0					2
82.	A. P. Roensen (NOR)																								2	2
82.	A. Korolev (KAZ)																0	0		0	2		0			2
82.	K. Kovaljeff (FIN)	2								0		0	0	0						0	0					2
90.	K. Gangnes (NOR)	0	1					0	0																	1
90.	T. Bogner (GER)																			1	0					1
90.	R. Freitag (GER)								0	0	1	0														1

Key:

= First place

= Second place

= Third place

= Top ten result

= Top thirty result (scored points)

= Four Hills Tournament

= Nordic Tournament
