= 2009–10 FIS Ski Jumping World Cup Individual Results Table =

Also see:

2009–10 FIS Ski Jumping World Cup

2009–10 FIS Ski Jumping World Cup Individual Points Table

Rk	Jumper	1	2	3	4	5	6	7	8	9	10	11	12	13	14	15	16	17	18	19	20	21	22	23	24	Pts
1.	S. Ammann (SUI)	12	12	1		1	2	1	5	3	2	3	2	5	5	1	2	2	4	1		1	1	1	1	1649
2.	G. Schlierenzauer (AUT)	19	1	4		2	1	6	9	1	1	6	5	1			1	1	7	3	1	4	11	2	12	1368
3.	T. Morgenstern (AUT)	20	2	21		3	8	6	3	9	14	1	12	15	1	30	3	3			4	3	5	5	5	944
4.	A. Kofler (AUT)	7	6	6		4	3	4	1	4	4	5	6	10			13	5		6	9	12	4	6	3	893
5.	A. Malysz (POL)		3	8		12	23	8	8	11	7	18	7	8			5	4	6	2		2	2	3	2	842
6.	W. Loitzl (AUT)	3	7	22		17	4	12	4	2	6	4	8	6			4	8	10	4		5	9	15	9	760
7.	A. Jacobsen (NOR)	5	40	36		30	18	15	24	5	5	10	40	13				7	1	7	2	41	3	20	15	557
8.	M. Koch (AUT)	11				11	7	9	10	12	18	8	3	4	8	3			5	11		26	22	17	6	545
9.	B. E. Romøren (NOR)	1	17	35		5	6	2	39	8	11	14	11	23			8	14	34	23	25			8	7	517
10.	R. Kranjec (SLO)	30	5	14		29	47	22	16	29	15	20	1	2			20	12	2	8		22	8	27	17	503
11.	J. Ahonen (FIN)	34	9			16	13	10	2	6	3	2	9	12			7	9	11			27				494
12.	M. Uhrmann (GER)	4	15	10		21	24	5	50	38	12	13	14	11			9	13	9	9	10	6	38	18	41	424
13.	D. Zauner (AUT)														9	9	6	6	12	5	8	10	6	4	4	403
14.	H. Olli (FIN)	50	4	2		7	27	24	17	15	24	11	35	3			30	38	39	31		7	18	23	20	367
15.	E. Chedal (FRA)	18	13	3		8	14	13	44	18	21	17	16	22			21	22	16		16	21	7	7	21	365
16.	D. Ito (JPN)	9	45			6	5	3	14	24	13	26			3	6						13	35	24	23	359
17.	N. Kasai (JPN)	10	49	30		13	15	35	13	13	9	19			6	2						11	16	9	19	344
18.	J. R. Evensen (NOR)	8	36	11		24	22	23	10	7	22	33	10	9			17	18	3		13			11	42	337
19.	P. Bodmer (GER)	2	14	5		25	11	16	12	16	8	9	21	20			37	23		20	21		41			336
20.	M. Neumayer (GER)	15	38	49		20	36	25	31	17	32	12	18	21	18	7			13	10	3	8	25	31	47	285
21.	A. Wank (GER)	42	16	9		26	20	34	40	20	50	34	30	28	2	5	10	15		21	24	37	55	43	50	259
22.	J. Janda (CZE)	25	26	13		18	32	20	26	14	37	31			34	11	11	10		15	7	15	24	22	13	256
23.	A. Hajek (CZE)												4	7	11	4	35		8			34	50	25	8	230
24.	K. Stoch (POL)	24	20	7		10	17	11		23	19	44					27	28				18	21	10	22	203
25.	S. Thurnbichler (AUT)								22	10	28	22	15	17	4	8	16	16	19	34	36					201
26.	T. Hilde (NOR)	26		24			8	30	36		43	27	20	24				36	17	17	5	20	15	34	18	180
27.	M. Hautamäki (FIN)	16	46	19					30	35	45	39	17	19			18	11	15			16	10	31	25	154
28.	D. Vassiliev (RUS)	36	18	20		9	12	18		19	16	7														151
29.	M. Schmitt (GER)	13	36	27		35	10	21	23	25	34	21								13	11	32	29	13	40	150
30.	R. Ljoekelsoey (NOR)		8	16		19	20	40	19	30	20	32	37	31								19	19	12	44	140
31.	J. Damjan (SVN)								7	21	37	23	27	38			15	20	28	14	14		36	28	24	134
32.	S. Tochimoto (JPN)	6	50	18		23	24	25	48		40	48			7	17						43	42	39		124
33.	A. Küttel (SUI)	46	11			14	33	14	28	50	37	46					12	19	25	24		30	33	48		111
34.	K. Keituri (FIN)	14				31	46		25	46	49	37	19	31			23	17	22	25		36	12	33	16	110
35.	P. Prevc (SLO)		22	31			26	27	32	28	36						14	26				17	14	19	14	106
36.	A. Bardal (NOR)		41												40	19	38	27	24	19	12	23	23	29	11	99
37.	S. Colloredo (ITA)			33		14	16	17	21	26	44	41	26	36			21	25			30	41	28	26	27	96
38.	F. Yumoto (JPN)	37	28					49				50			12	15				12	17	24	43		33	84
39.	M. Fettner (AUT)	16	48			44		39			26	45										14	34	14	10	82
39.	M. Innauer (AUT)										10	15			23	14	19	29								82
41.	L. Rutkowski (POL)	28	41	47			37	50					13	25	13	13	25	31	37			43	30	49	28	79
42.	S. Freund (GER)									47					31	12	26	21	23	27	19	39	17	36		75
43.	L. Müller (AUT)								6	22	34	28	25	18												71
44.	M. Meznar (SLO)	31	29	17		38	29	37	18	41	46	30	23	35			24	24				33	31	21	35	64
45.	K. Mietus (POL)	43	21	12		22	50	19	49	43			28	27			41									60
45.	A. Morassi (ITA)		35	25		28	39		38	36		47	22	14			34				18	40	20	38		60
47.	V. Descombes-Sevoie (FRA)	45		23			43	48										40	29		23	25	13	16		59
48.	L. Hlava (CZE)		24	28		33	30		15	27	31	29	31	33	16	23	31	34						37	32	56
49.	M. Hayboeck (AUT)										17	38									6					54
49.	J. Happonen (FIN)	21	44	26		35							33	26			33	34				9	26	42	37	54
49.	T. Takeuchi (JPN)	27		39		49	35	27	34	42	27				15	10						49	39	47	48	54
52.	B. Sedlak (CZE)												29	16				31	14	18	28					51
53.	J. Matura (CZE)					27	31	32	20	39									27	16	22	29	40		38	45
54.	G. Spaeth (GER)					40									10	16	39	30		37						42
55.	O. Muotka (FIN)														14	20				26	33	28	27	50	39	41
56.	A. Stjernen (NOR)		19												17	22	45	33							30	36
57.	P. Karelin (RUS)	38	23	29		41	34		35		23	16										48		30	31	34
58.	P. Pikl (SLO)	22	43			48	40	41							21	17			31	32						33
59.	M. Bachleda (POL)	33	27	15		47	40	43					34	30	27	24	36	37		44						32
60.	A. Fannemel (NOR)		10																							26
60.	D. Kornilov (RUS)		31	45		34		38	33	34	25	43	24	34			32	38	18			47	32	40	45	26
62.	M. Cikl (CZE)	39	31	44			19	31	27	32		24														23
63.	R. Koudelka (CZE)	23		48		37									19	33						31	37	45		20
63.	G. Mietus (POL)																48	47		22	20					20
63.	S. Hula (POL)					39	37	27	37	48	41	25	31	29	30	37	29					45	47	35	26	20
66.	Y. Sakano (JPN)														20	25										17
67.	V. Larinto (FIN)							44	40	33	47							50			15					16
68.	V. Shumbarets (UKR)	48				41	40	36	45	45					42	21	47	48		28						13
69.	V. Sklett (NOR)			40		43	44								44	41			20	42	39					11
69.	A. Kokkonen (NOR)		25												50	26										11
71.	J. Tepes (SLO)														47	40			21	33	37					10
71.	K. Sakuyama (JPN)														21	44										10
73.	K. Yoshioka (JPN)														28	26			30	45	34					9
74.	M. Mechler (GER)									49	32				36	28			26	38						8
75.	Y. Watase (JPN)														24				38	39	44					7
76.	D. Ipatov (RUS)			43											25			45					52			6
77.	K. Yliriesto (FIN)														26	31										5
77.	F. Schabereiter (AUT)																				26					5
79.	R. Hrgota (SLO)														32						27					4
80.	I. Rosliakov (RUS)		39			32	28	45		44	42				46	44	44	46				50	54			3
80.	S. Hocke (GER)								47						33	39	28	42	32							3
82.	N. Karpenko (KAZ)									31	29												44	46	49	2
82.	H. Kim (KOR)	40				50			29			36	36	39		47								41	46	2
82.	A. Higashi (JPN)														43					29	35					2
82.	T. Okabe (JPN)			33											29	42							45			2
82.	R. Dellasega (ITA)			46											49	29					49					2
82.	A. P. Roensen (NOR)																								29	2
82.	A. Korolev (KAZ)																46	41		36	29		48			2
82.	K. Kovaljeff (FIN)	29								37		49	38	37						47	42					2
90.	K. Gangnes (NOR)	32	30					33	43																	1
90.	T. Bogner (GER)																			30	31					1
90.	R. Freitag (GER)								46	40	30	42														1

Key:

= First place

= Second place

= Third place

= Top ten result

= Top thirty result (scored points)

= Four Hills Tournament

= Nordic Tournament
