= 2009–10 FIS Ski Jumping Continental Cup =

Ski-jumping competition series

FIS Ski Jumping Continental Cup 2009/10
| Discipline | Men | Women |
| Summer | (Slovenia) Robert Kranjec | (Germany) Ulrike Gräßler |
| Winter | (Austria) David Unterberger | (Austria) Daniela Iraschko |

Competition
| Edition | 8th (Summer), 19th (Winter) | 2nd (Summer), 6th (Winter) |
| Locations | 6 (Summer), 14 (Winter) | 4 (Summer), 9 (Winter) |
| Individual | 11 (Summer), 26 (Winter) | 7 (Summer), 18 (Winter) |
| Cancelled | — (Summer), 3 (Winter) | — (Summer), 1 (Winter) |
| Rescheduled | — (Summer), 4 (Winter) | 1 (Summer), 7 (Winter) |

The 2009/10 FIS Ski Jumping Continental Cup was the 19th in a row (17th official) Continental Cup winter season and the 8th official summer season in ski jumping for men.

This was also the 6th winter and the 2nd summer season for women. FIS Ladies Winter Tournament win went to Daniela Iraschko.

Other competitions this season were World Cup and Grand Prix.

== Men's Summer ==
Individual men's events in the CC history

| Total | F | L | N | Winners |
|---|---|---|---|---|
| 80 | — | 29 | 51 |

after large hill event in Wisła (13 September 2009)

=== Calendar ===
| All | No. | Date | Place (Hill) | Size | Winner | Second | Third | Overall leader | R. |
|---|---|---|---|---|---|---|---|---|---|
| 70 | 1 | 3 July 2009 | (Slovenia) Velenje (Grajski grič HS94) | N _{046} | (Slovenia) Robert Kranjec (Slovenia) Primož Pikl | | (Norway) Akseli Kokkonen | (Slovenia) Robert Kranjec (Slovenia) Primož Pikl | |
| 71 | 2 | 4 July 2009 | (Slovenia) Kranj (Bauhenk HS109) | N _{047} | (Slovenia) Primož Pikl | (Slovenia) Robert Kranjec | (Poland) Marcin Bachleda | (Slovenia) Primož Pikl | |
| 72 | 3 | 5 July 2009 | (Slovenia) Kranj (Bauhenk HS109) | N _{048} | (Slovenia) Robert Kranjec | (Austria) Thomas Diethart | (Austria) Daniel Lackner | (Slovenia) Robert Kranjec | |
| 73 | 4 | 11 July 2009 | (Austria) Villach (Villacher Alpenarena HS100) | N _{049} | (Slovenia) Robert Kranjec | (Austria) Lukas Müller | (Austria) Daniel Lackner | (Slovenia) Robert Kranjec | |
| 74 | 5 | 12 July 2009 | (Austria) Villach (Villacher Alpenarena HS100) | N _{050} | (Slovenia) Robert Kranjec | (Slovenia) Primož Pikl | (Austria) Lukas Müller | (Slovenia) Robert Kranjec | |
| 75 | 6 | 22 August 2009 | (Norway) Lillehammer (Lysgårdsbakken HS138) | L _{025} | (Norway) Roar Ljøkelsøy | (Norway) Fredrik Bjerkeengen | (Norway) Thomas Lobben | (Slovenia) Robert Kranjec | |
| 76 | 7 | 23 August 2009 | (Norway) Lillehammer (Lysgårdsbakken HS138) | L _{026} | (Norway) Anders Fannemel | (Germany) Erik Simon | (Slovenia) Robert Hrgota | (Slovenia) Robert Kranjec | |
| 77 | 8 | 3 September 2009 | (South Korea) Pyeongchang (Alpensia HS109 / 140) | N _{051} | (Poland) Stefan Hula | (South Korea) Kim Hyun-ki | (Slovenia) Jurij Tepeš | (Slovenia) Robert Kranjec | |
| 78 | 9 | 5 September 2009 | (South Korea) Pyeongchang (Alpensia HS109 / 140) | L _{027} | (South Korea) Kim Hyun-ki | (Poland) Dawid Kubacki | (Poland) Stefan Hula | (Slovenia) Robert Kranjec | |
| 79 | 10 | 12 September 2009 | (Poland) Wisła (Malinka HS134) | L _{028} | (Poland) Marcin Bachleda | (Poland) Adam Małysz | (Poland) Łukasz Rutkowski | (Slovenia) Robert Kranjec | |
| 80 | 11 | 13 September 2009 | (Poland) Wisła (Malinka HS134) | L _{029} | (Poland) Marcin Bachleda | (Poland) Adam Małysz | (Poland) Łukasz Rutkowski | (Slovenia) Robert Kranjec | |
| 8th FIS Summer Continental Cup Men's Overall (3 July – 13 September 2009) | | | | | (Slovenia) Robert Kranjec | (Norway) Akseli Kokkonen | (Poland) Marcin Bachleda | Summer Overall | |

==== Overall ====
| Rank | after 11 events | Points |
|---|---|---|
| 1 | (Slovenia) Robert Kranjec | 480 |
| 2 | (Norway) Akseli Kokkonen | 440 |
| 3 | (Poland) Marcin Bachleda | 429 |
| 4 | (Slovenia) Primož Pikl | 332 |
| 5 | (Austria) Lukas Müller | 317 |
| 6 | (Austria) Thomas Diethart | 256 |
| 7 | (Austria) Michael Hayböck | 241 |
| 8 | (Austria) Daniel Lackner | 239 |
| 9 | (Poland) Stefan Hula | 192 |
| 10 | (South Korea) Kim Hyun-ki | 180 |

== Men's Winter ==
Individual men's events in the CC history

| Total | F | L | N | Winners |
|---|---|---|---|---|
| 665 | 4 | 299 | 362 |

after large hill event in Kuusamo (14 March 2010)

=== Calendar ===
| All | No. | Date | Place (Hill) | Size | Winner | Second | Third | Overall leader | R. |
|---|---|---|---|---|---|---|---|---|---|
| | | 1 December 2009 | (Finland) Rovaniemi (Ounasvaara HS100) | N _{cnx} | cancelled and rescheduled to 8 December | | | — | |
| | | 2 December 2009 | (Finland) Rovaniemi (Ounasvaara HS100) | N _{cnx} | cancelled and rescheduled to 9 December | | | — | |
| | | 5 December 2009 | (Norway) Vikersund (Vikersundbakken HS117) | L _{cnx} | cancelled and rescheduled to 12 December | | | — | |
| | | 6 December 2009 | (Norway) Vikersund (Vikersundbakken HS117) | L _{cnx} | cancelled and rescheduled to 13 December | | | — | |
| 640 | 1 | (Note: Cancelled men's winter event from Rovaniemi (1 December) was rescheduled to 8 December.)8 December 2009 | (Finland) Rovaniemi (Ounasvaara HS100) | N _{356} | (Austria) Lukas Müller | (Austria) Stefan Thurnbichler | (Austria) Andreas Strolz | (Austria) Lukas Müller | |
| 641 | 2 | (Note: Cancelled men's winter event from Rovaniemi (2 December) was rescheduled to 9 December.)9 December 2009 | (Finland) Rovaniemi (Ounasvaara HS100) | N _{357} | (Austria) Andreas Strolz | (Austria) Stefan Thurnbichler | (Germany) Stephan Hocke | (Austria) Stefan Thurnbichler | |
| 642 | 3 | (Note: Cancelled men's winter event from Vikersund (6 December) was rescheduled to 13 December (cancelled again) and finally rescheduled to 11 December.)11 December 2009 | (Norway) Vikersund (Vikersundbakken HS117) | L _{281} | (Austria) Stefan Thurnbichler | (Austria) Michael Hayböck | (Austria) Lukas Müller | (Austria) Stefan Thurnbichler | |
| 643 | 4 | (Note: Cancelled men's winter event from Vikersund (5 December) was rescheduled to 12 December.)12 December 2009 | (Norway) Vikersund (Vikersundbakken HS117) | L _{282} | (Austria) Lukas Müller | (Austria) Stefan Thurnbichler | (Germany) Richard Freitag | (Austria) Stefan Thurnbichler | |
| | | 13 December 2009 | (Norway) Vikersund (Vikersundbakken HS117) | L _{cnx} | cancelled again and rescheduled to 11 December | | | — | |
| 644 | 5 | 19 December 2009 | (Estonia) Otepää (Tehvandi spordikeskus HS100) | N _{358} | (Slovenia) Matic Kramaršič | (Germany) Stephan Hocke | (Austria) Mario Innauer | (Austria) Stefan Thurnbichler | |
| 645 | 6 | 20 December 2009 | (Estonia) Otepää (Tehvandi spordikeskus HS100) | N _{359} | (Poland) Grzegorz Miętus | (Austria) David Unterberger | (Slovenia) Jernej Damjan (Germany) Felix Schoft | (Austria) Stefan Thurnbichler | |
| 646 | 7 | 27 December 2009 | (Switzerland) Engelberg (Gross-Titlis-Schanze HS137) | L _{283} | (Germany) Maximilian Mechler | (Austria) Markus Eggenhofer | (Norway) Anders Bardal | (Austria) Stefan Thurnbichler | |
| 647 | 8 | 28 December 2009 | (Switzerland) Engelberg (Gross-Titlis-Schanze HS137) | L _{284} | (Austria) Michael Hayböck | (Czech Republic) Antonín Hájek | (Austria) Markus Eggenhofer | (Austria) Andreas Strolz | |
| 648 | 9 | 8 January 2010 | (Japan) Sapporo (Miyanomori HS100) (Ōkurayama HS134) | N _{360} | (Norway) Anders Bardal | (Poland) Maciej Kot | (Germany) Julian Musiol | (Austria) Andreas Strolz | |
| 649 | 10 | 9 January 2010 | (Japan) Sapporo (Miyanomori HS100) (Ōkurayama HS134) | L _{285} | (Italy) Diego Dellasega | (Norway) Anders Bardal | (Austria) T. Thurnbichler | (Austria) Andreas Strolz | |
| 650 | 11 | 10 January 2010 | (Japan) Sapporo (Miyanomori HS100) (Ōkurayama HS134) | L _{286} | (Japan) Akira Higashi | (Austria) Florian Schabereiter | (Norway) Anders Bardal | (Norway) Anders Bardal | |
| 651 | 12 | 16 January 2010 | (Germany) Titisee-Neustadt (Hochfirstschanze HS142) | L _{287} | (Austria) Michael Hayböck | (Austria) Björn Koch | (Czech Republic) Borek Sedlák | (Austria) Michael Hayböck | |
| | | 17 January 2010 | (Germany) Titisee-Neustadt (Hochfirstschanze HS142) | L _{cnx} | cancelled due to strong winds and sleet | | | — | |
| 652 | 13 | 23 January 2010 | (Austria) Bischofshofen (Paul-Ausserleitner HS140) | L _{288} | (Austria) David Unterberger | (Austria) Michael Hayböck | (Czech Republic) Martin Cikl | (Austria) Michael Hayböck | |
| 653 | 14 | 24 January 2010 | (Austria) Bischofshofen (Paul-Ausserleitner HS140) | L _{289} | (Austria) David Unterberger | (Austria) Manuel Fettner | (Austria) Michael Hayböck | (Austria) Michael Hayböck | |
| 654 | 15 | 30 January 2010 | (United States) Iron Mountain (Pine Mountain HS133) | L _{290} | (Austria) Manuel Fettner | (Norway) Andreas Stjernen | (Austria) Markus Eggenhofer | (Austria) Michael Hayböck | |
| | | 31 January 2010 | (United States) Iron Mountain (Pine Mountain HS133) | L _{cnx} | cancelled due to strong winds and sleet | | | — | |
| 655 | 16 | 6 February 2010 | (Poland) Zakopane (Wielka Krokiew HS134) | L _{291} | (Austria) Manuel Fettner | (Poland) Maciej Kot | (Austria) David Unterberger | (Austria) Michael Hayböck | |
| 656 | 17 | 7 February 2010 | (Poland) Zakopane (Wielka Krokiew HS134) | L _{292} | (Austria) Manuel Fettner | (Austria) David Unterberger | (Poland) Rafał Śliż | (Austria) Michael Hayböck | |
| 657 | 18 | 13 February 2010 | (Slovenia) Kranj (Bauhenk HS109) | N _{361} | (Austria) David Unterberger | (Germany) Julian Musiol | (Germany) Tobias Bogner | (Austria) David Unterberger | |
| 658 | 19 | 14 February 2010 | (Slovenia) Kranj (Bauhenk HS109) | N _{362} | (Austria) David Unterberger | (Germany) Julian Musiol | (Norway) Roar Ljøkelsøy | (Austria) David Unterberger | |
| 659 | 20 | 20 February 2010 | (Germany) Brotterode (Inselbergschanze HS117) | L _{293} | (Germany) Severin Freund | (Austria) David Unterberger | (Austria) Michael Hayböck | (Austria) David Unterberger | |
| 660 | 21 | 21 February 2010 | (Germany) Brotterode (Inselbergschanze HS117) | L _{294} | (Czech Republic) Jan Matura | (Norway) Roar Ljøkelsøy | (Poland) Rafał Śliż | (Austria) David Unterberger | |
| 661 | 22 | 27 February 2010 | (Poland) Wisła (Malinka HS134) | L _{295} | (Poland) Adam Małysz | (Austria) Manuel Fettner | (Poland) Kamil Stoch | (Austria) David Unterberger | |
| | | 28 February 2010 | (Poland) Wisła (Malinka HS134) | L _{cnx} | cancelled | | | — | |
| 662 | 23 | 6 March 2010 | (Norway) Oslo (Holmenkollbakken HS134) | L _{296} | (Austria) David Unterberger | (Germany) Richard Freitag | (Poland) Rafał Śliż | (Austria) David Unterberger | |
| 663 | 24 | 7 March 2010 | (Norway) Oslo (Holmenkollbakken HS134) | L _{297} | (Austria) David Unterberger | (Poland) Rafał Śliż | (Austria) Florian Schabereiter | (Austria) David Unterberger | |
| 664 | 25 | 13 March 2010 | (Finland) Kuusamo (Rukatunturi HS142) | L _{298} | (Poland) Rafał Śliż | (Austria) Florian Schabereiter | (Austria) David Unterberger | (Austria) David Unterberger | |
| 665 | 26 | 14 March 2010 | (Finland) Kuusamo (Rukatunturi HS142) | L _{299} | (Austria) Florian Schabereiter | (Slovenia) Robert Hrgota | (Austria) David Unterberger | (Austria) David Unterberger | |
| 19th FIS Winter Continental Cup Men's Overall (8 December 2009 – 14 March 2010) | | | | | (Austria) David Unterberger | (Austria) Michael Hayböck | (Austria) Manuel Fettner | Winter Overall | |

==== Overall ====
| Rank | after 26 events | Points |
|---|---|---|
| 1 | (Austria) David Unterberger | 1147 |
| 2 | (Austria) Michael Hayböck | 714 |
| 3 | (Austria) Manuel Fettner | 630 |
| 4 | (Slovenia) Robert Hrgota | 522 |
| 5 | (Austria) Markus Eggenhofer | 504 |
| 6 | (Austria) Andreas Strolz | 498 |
| 7 | (Austria) Lukas Müller | 495 |
| 8 | (Austria) Florian Schabereiter | 460 |
| 9 | (Norway) Andreas Stjernen | 450 |
| 10 | (Austria) Stefan Thurnbichler | 448 |

== Women's Summer ==
Individual women's events in the CC history

| Total | L | N | M | Winners |
|---|---|---|---|---|
| 17 | — | 10 | 7 |

after normal hill event in Lillehammer (22 August 2009)

=== Calendar ===
| All | No. | Date | Place (Hill) | Size | Winner | Second | Third | Overall leader | R. |
|---|---|---|---|---|---|---|---|---|---|
| 11 | 1 | 8 August 2009 | (Germany) Bischofsgrün (Ochsenkopfschanzen HS71) | M _{005} | (Germany) Ulrike Gräßler | (Switzerland) Bigna Windmüller | (France) Caroline Espiau | (Germany) Ulrike Gräßler | |
| 12 | 2 | 9 August 2009 | (Germany) Bischofsgrün (Ochsenkopfschanzen HS71) | M _{006} | (Germany) Ulrike Gräßler | (Japan) Ayumi Watase | (Germany) Magdalena Schnurr | (Germany) Ulrike Gräßler | |
| 13 | 3 | 12 August 2009 | (Germany) Pöhla (Pöhlbachschanze HS65) | M _{007} | (Germany) Magdalena Schnurr | (Germany) Melanie Faißt | (Japan) Ayumi Watase | (Germany) Ulrike Gräßler | |
| 14 | 4 | 14 August 2009 | (Germany) Oberwiesenthal (Fichtelbergschanzen HS106) | N _{007} | (Norway) Anette Sagen | (Germany) Ulrike Gräßler | (Germany) Melanie Faißt | (Germany) Ulrike Gräßler | |
| 15 | 5 | 15 August 2009 | (Germany) Oberwiesenthal (Fichtelbergschanzen HS106) | N _{008} | (Germany) Ulrike Gräßler | (Japan) Ayumi Watase | (Norway) Line Jahr | (Germany) Ulrike Gräßler | |
| 16 | 6 | (Note: Cancelled women's summer event from Lillehammer (23 August) was rescheduled to 21 August.)21 August 2009 | (Norway) Lillehammer (Lysgårdsbakken HS100) | N _{009} | (Germany) Ulrike Gräßler | (Norway) Line Jahr | (United States) Sarah Hendrickson | (Germany) Ulrike Gräßler | |
| 17 | 7 | 22 August 2009 | (Norway) Lillehammer (Lysgårdsbakken HS100) | N _{010} | (Norway) Line Jahr | (United States) Sarah Hendrickson | (Japan) Yūki Itō | (Germany) Ulrike Gräßler | |
| | | 23 August 2009 | (Norway) Lillehammer (Lysgårdsbakken HS100) | N _{cnx} | cancelled and rescheduled to 21 August | | | — | |
| 2nd FIS Summer Continental Cup Women's Overall (8 – 22 August 2009) | | | | | (Germany) Ulrike Gräßler | (Japan) Ayumi Watase | (Germany) Melanie Faißt | Summer Overall | |

==== Overall ====
| Rank | after 7 events | Points |
|---|---|---|
| 1 | (Germany) Ulrike Gräßler | 580 |
| 2 | (Japan) Ayumi Watase | 339 |
| 3 | (Germany) Melanie Faißt | 289 |
| 4 | (United States) Sarah Hendrickson | 286 |
| 5 | (Switzerland) Bigna Windmüller | 282 |
| 6 | (Norway) Line Jahr | 280 |
| 7 | (Germany) Magdalena Schnurr | 236 |
| 8 | (Slovenia) Eva Logar | 202 |
| 9 | (Germany) Juliane Seyfarth | 187 |
| 10 | (Japan) Yūki Itō | 186 |

== Women's Individual ==
Individual women's events in the CC history

| Total | L | N | M | Winners |
|---|---|---|---|---|
| 103 | 3 | 84 | 16 |

after normal hill event in Zakopane (7 March 2010)

=== Calendar ===
| All | No. | Date | Place (Hill) | Size | Winner | Second | Third | Overall leader | R. |
|---|---|---|---|---|---|---|---|---|---|
| | | 1 December 2009 | (Finland) Rovaniemi (Ounasvaara HS100) | N _{cnx} | cancelled and rescheduled to 8 December | | | — | |
| | | 2 December 2009 | (Finland) Rovaniemi (Ounasvaara HS100) | N _{cnx} | cancelled and rescheduled to 9 December | | | — | |
| | | 5 December 2009 | (Norway) Vikersund (Vikersundbakken HS117) | L _{cnx} | cancelled and rescheduled to 12 December | | | — | |
| | | 6 December 2009 | (Norway) Vikersund (Vikersundbakken HS117) | L _{cnx} | cancelled and rescheduled to 13 December | | | — | |
| 86 | 1 | (Note: Cancelled women's winter event from Rovaniemi (1 December) was rescheduled to 8 December.)8 December 2009 | (Finland) Rovaniemi (Ounasvaara HS100) | N _{069} | (Norway) Anette Sagen | (Germany) Ulrike Gräßler | (Norway) Line Jahr | (Norway) Anette Sagen | |
| 87 | 2 | (Note: Cancelled women's winter event from Rovaniemi (2 December) was rescheduled to 9 December.)9 December 2009 | (Finland) Rovaniemi (Ounasvaara HS100) | N _{070} | (Germany) Ulrike Gräßler | (Austria) Daniela Iraschko | (Norway) Anette Sagen | (Germany) Ulrike Gräßler | |
| 88 | 3 | (Note: Cancelled women's winter event from Vikersund (5 December) was rescheduled to 12 December.)12 December 2009 | (Norway) Vikersund (Vikersundbakken HS117) | L _{002} | (Austria) Daniela Iraschko | (Germany) Ulrike Gräßler | (Norway) Anette Sagen | (Germany) Ulrike Gräßler | |
| 89 | 4 | (Note: Cancelled women's winter event from Vikersund (6 December) was rescheduled to 13 December.)13 December 2009 | (Norway) Vikersund (Vikersundbakken HS117) | L _{003} | (Austria) Daniela Iraschko | (Norway) Anette Sagen | (Germany) Ulrike Gräßler | (Germany) Ulrike Gräßler | |
| | | 12 December 2009 | (Norway) Notodden (Tveitanbakken HS100) | N _{cnx} | cancelled and rescheduled to 18 December | | | — | |
| | | 13 December 2009 | (Norway) Notodden (Tveitanbakken HS100) | N _{cnx} | cancelled and rescheduled to 19 December | | | — | |
| 90 | 5 | (Note: Cancelled women's winter event from Notodden (5 December) was rescheduled to 12 December.)18 December 2009 | (Norway) Notodden (Tveitanbakken HS100) | N _{071} | (Austria) Daniela Iraschko | (Germany) Ulrike Gräßler | (Norway) Anette Sagen | (Austria) Daniela Iraschko | |
| 91 | 6 | (Note: Cancelled women's winter event from Notodden (6 December) was rescheduled to 13 December.)19 December 2009 | (Norway) Notodden (Tveitanbakken HS100) | N _{072} | (Austria) Daniela Iraschko | (Norway) Anette Sagen | (Germany) Ulrike Gräßler | (Austria) Daniela Iraschko | |
| 92 | 7 | 2 January 2010 | (Germany) Baiersbronn (Große Ruhesteinschanze HS90) | N _{073} | (Germany) Carina Vogt | (Austria) Daniela Iraschko | (Norway) Anette Sagen | (Austria) Daniela Iraschko | |
| 93 | 8 | 3 January 2010 | (Germany) Baiersbronn (Große Ruhesteinschanze HS90) | N _{074} | (Austria) Daniela Iraschko | (Norway) Anette Sagen | (Germany) Ulrike Gräßler | (Austria) Daniela Iraschko | |
| 94 | 9 | 6 January 2010 | (Germany) Schonach (Langenwaldschanze HS96) | N _{075} | (Austria) Daniela Iraschko | (Germany) Carina Vogt | (Norway) Anette Sagen | (Austria) Daniela Iraschko | |
| | | 9 January 2010 | (Germany) Braunlage (Wurmbergschanze HS100) | N _{cnx} | cancelled due to strong wind and heavy snow | | | — | |
| | | 10 January 2010 | (Germany) Braunlage (Wurmbergschanze HS100) | N _{cnx} | cancelled due to strong wind and heavy snow | | | — | |
| FIS Ladies Winter Tournament (2 – 8 January 2010) | | | | | (Austria) Daniela Iraschko | (Norway) Anette Sagen | (Germany) Ulrike Gräßler | Winter Tournament | |
| 95 | 10 | (Note: Cancelled women's winter event from Schonach (24 January) was rescheduled to 23 January.)23 January 2010 | (Germany) Schonach (Langenwaldschanze HS96) | N _{076} | (Austria) Daniela Iraschko | (France) Coline Mattel | (Norway) Anette Sagen | (Austria) Daniela Iraschko | |
| | | 24 January 2010 | (Germany) Schonach (Langenwaldschanze HS96) | N _{cnx} | cancelled and rescheduled to 23 January | | | — | |
| 96 | 11 | 6 February 2010 | (Slovenia) Ljubno (Savina HS95) | N _{077} | (Austria) Daniela Iraschko | (Germany) Ulrike Gräßler | (Norway) Anette Sagen | (Austria) Daniela Iraschko | |
| 97 | 12 | 7 February 2010 | (Slovenia) Ljubno (Savina HS95) | N _{078} | (Austria) Daniela Iraschko | (Germany) Ulrike Gräßler | (Norway) Anette Sagen | (Austria) Daniela Iraschko | |
| 98 | 13 | 13 February 2010 | (Austria) Villach (Villacher Alpenarena HS98) | N _{079} | (Austria) Daniela Iraschko | (Germany) Ulrike Gräßler | (Norway) Anette Sagen | (Austria) Daniela Iraschko | |
| 99 | 14 | 14 February 2010 | (Austria) Villach (Villacher Alpenarena HS98) | N _{080} | (Germany) Ulrike Gräßler | (Austria) Daniela Iraschko | (United States) Sarah Hendrickson | (Austria) Daniela Iraschko | |
| 100 | 15 | 1 March 2010 | (Japan) Zaō (Yamagata HS100) | N _{081} | (Austria) Daniela Iraschko | (Norway) Anette Sagen | (Germany) Ulrike Gräßler | (Austria) Daniela Iraschko | |
| 101 | 16 | 2 March 2010 | (Japan) Zaō (Yamagata HS100) | N _{082} | (Germany) Ulrike Gräßler | (Austria) Daniela Iraschko | (Japan) Sara Takanashi | (Austria) Daniela Iraschko | |
| 102 | 17 | 6 March 2010 | (Poland) Zakopane (Średnia Krokiew HS94) | N _{083} | (Austria) Daniela Iraschko | (Germany) Ulrike Gräßler | (Norway) Anette Sagen | (Austria) Daniela Iraschko | |
| 103 | 18 | 7 March 2010 | (Poland) Zakopane (Średnia Krokiew HS94) | N _{084} | (Austria) Daniela Iraschko | (Germany) Ulrike Gräßler | (Slovenia) Eva Logar | (Austria) Daniela Iraschko | |
| 6th FIS Winter Continental Cup Women's Overall (8 December – 7 March 2010) | | | | | (Austria) Daniela Iraschko | (Germany) Ulrike Gräßler | (Norway) Anette Sagen | Winter Overall | |

==== Overall ====
| Rank | after 18 events | Points |
|---|---|---|
| 1 | (Austria) Daniela Iraschko | 1644 |
| 2 | (Germany) Ulrike Gräßler | 1307 |
| 3 | (Norway) Anette Sagen | 1152 |
| 4 | (Slovenia) Eva Logar | 632 |
| 5 | (Germany) Melanie Faißt | 552 |
| 6 | (United States) Sarah Hendrickson | 524 |
| 7 | (Norway) Line Jahr | 517 |
| 8 | (Germany) Carina Vogt | 441 |
| 9 | (United States) Alissa Johnson | 419 |
| 10 | (Austria) J. Seifriedsberger | 404 |

== Europa Cup vs. Continental Cup ==
- Last two Europa Cup seasons (1991/92 and 1992/93) are recognized as first two Continental Cup seasons by International Ski Federation (FIS), although Continental Cup under this name officially started first season in 1993/94 season.

== See also ==
- 2009–10 FIS World Cup
- 2009 FIS Grand Prix
