= 2008–09 FIS Ski Flying World Cup =

FIS Ski Flying World Cup 2008/09
Winners
- Overall: (Austria) Gregor Schlierenzauer
- Nations Cup (unofficial): Austria

Competitions
- Venues: 4
- Individual: 6
- Team: 3

The 2008/09 FIS Ski Flying World Cup was the 12th official World Cup season in ski flying awarded with small crystal globe as the subdiscipline of FIS Ski Jumping World Cup. Competition with small globe award returned this season after eight years long break.

== Map of World Cup hosts ==
(Austria) Bad Mitterndorf	(Germany) Oberstdorf	(Norway) Vikersund	(Slovenia) Planica
Kulm	Heini-Klopfer	Vikersundbakken	Letalnica bratov Gorišek
Europe

== Calendar ==
=== Men's Individual ===
All	No.	Date	Place (Hill)	Size	Winner	Second	Third	Ski flying leader	R.
694	1	10 January 2009	(Austria) Bad Mitterndorf (Kulm HS200)	F _{070}	(Austria) Gregor Schlierenzauer	(Switzerland) Simon Ammann	(Austria) Martin Koch	(Austria) G. Schlierenzauer	
695	2	11 January 2009	(Austria) Bad Mitterndorf (Kulm HS200)	F _{071}	(Austria) Gregor Schlierenzauer	(Finland) Harri Olli	(Switzerland) Simon Ammann	(Austria) G. Schlierenzauer	
703	3	14 February 2009	(Germany) Oberstdorf (Heini-Klopfer HS213)	F _{072}	(Finland) Harri Olli	(Norway) Anders Jacobsen	(Norway) J. Remen Evensen	(Austria) G. Schlierenzauer	
707	4	15 March 2009	(Norway) Vikersund (Vikersundbakken HS207)	F _{073}	(Austria) Gregor Schlierenzauer	(Switzerland) Simon Ammann	(Russia) Dimitry Vassiliev	(Austria) G. Schlierenzauer	
708	5	20 March 2009	(Slovenia) Planica (Letalnica b. Gorišek HS215)	F _{074}	(Austria) Gregor Schlierenzauer	(Poland) Adam Małysz	(Russia) Dimitry Vassiliev	(Austria) G. Schlierenzauer	
709	6	22 March 2009	(Slovenia) Planica (Letalnica b. Gorišek HS215)	F _{075}	(Finland) Harri Olli	(Poland) Adam Małysz	(Switzerland) Simon Ammann (Slovenia) Robert Kranjec	(Austria) G. Schlierenzauer	
12th FIS Ski Flying Men's Overall (10 January – 22 March 2009)					(Austria) Gregor Schlierenzauer	(Finland) Harri Olli	(Switzerland) Simon Ammann	Ski Flying Overall	

=== Men's team ===
All	No.	Date	Place (Hill)	Size	Winner	Second	Third	R.
42	1	15 February 2009	(Germany) Oberstdorf (Heini-Klopfer HS213)	F _{006}	Finland Kalle Keituri; Juha-Matti Ruuskanen; Matti Hautamäki; Harri Olli	Russia Denis Kornilov; Pavel Karelin; Ilya Rosliakov; Dimitry Vassiliev	Austria Wolfgang Loitzl; Markus Eggenhofer; Andreas Kofler; Martin Koch	
44	2	14 March 2009	(Norway) Vikersund (Vikersundbakken HS207)	F _{007}	Austria Martin Koch; Wolfgang Loitzl; Thomas Morgenstern; Gregor Schlierenzauer	Finland Matti Hautamäki; Kalle Keituri; Ville Larinto; Harri Olli	Norway Johan Remen Evensen; Bjørn Einar Romøren; Anders Bardal; Anders Jacobsen	
45	3	21 March 2009	(Slovenia) Planica (Letalnica bratov Gorišek HS215)	F _{008}	Norway Tom Hilde; Johan Remen Evensen; Anders Jacobsen; Anders Bardal	Poland Kamil Stoch; Łukasz Rutkowski; Stefan Hula; Adam Małysz	Russia Denis Kornilov; Pavel Karelin; Ilya Rosliakov; Dimitry Vassiliev	

Nordic Tournament (part of)
FIS Team Tour (part of)

== Standings ==
=== Ski Flying ===
Rank	after 6 events	10/01/2009 Kulm	11/01/2009 Kulm	14/02/2009 Oberstdorf	15/03/2009 Vikersund	20/03/2009 Planica	22/03/2009 Planica	Total
	(Austria) Gregor Schlierenzauer	100	100	32	100	100	45	477
2	(Finland) Harri Olli	24	80	100	36	32	100	372
3	(Switzerland) Simon Ammann	80	60	50	80	40	60	370
4	(Austria) Martin Koch	60	45	24	50	18	24	221
5	(Norway) Anders Jacobsen	50	50	80	9	9	22	220
6	(Russia) Dimitry Vassiliev	—	—	40	60	60	40	200
7	(Slovenia) Robert Kranjec	22	15	14	45	36	60	192
	(Poland) Adam Małysz	—	—	—	32	80	80	192
9	(Finland) Matti Hautamäki	29	40	45	24	14	4	156
10	(Norway) Anders Bardal	26	11	36	—	50	20	143
11	(Norway) Johan Remen Evensen	11	20	60	26	7	7	131
12	(Austria) Wolfgang Loitzl	36	26	10	16	22	18	128
13	(Germany) Martin Schmitt	20	22	16	22	11	26	117
14	(France) Emmanuel Chedal	32	24	22	20	—	16	114
15	(Norway) Tom Hilde	15	32	7	—	45	3	102
16	(Switzerland) Andreas Küttel	—	—	29	29	24	15	97
17	(Finland) Ville Larinto	45	36	—	10	2	—	93
18	(Austria) Thomas Morgenstern	40	29	—	8	4	10	91
19	(Norway) Roar Ljøkelsøy	18	14	20	—	16	13	81
20	(Japan) Noriaki Kasai	—	—	—	40	3	36	79
21	(Germany) Michael Neumayer	12	18	6	18	—	12	66
22	(Poland) Kamil Stoch	—	—	—	—	26	32	58
23	(Austria) Markus Eggenhofer	16	1	9	15	—	5	46
24	(Finland) Kalle Keituri	—	—	26	12	—	6	44
25	(Czech Republic) Roman Koudelka	—	—	—	14	—	29	43
26	(Norway) Bjørn Einar Romøren	13	13	15	—	—	—	41
	(Russia) Pavel Karelin	9	12	5	3	12	—	41
28	(Germany) Michael Uhrmann	10	16	—	13	—	1	40
29	(Norway) Vegard Haukø Sklett	—	—	13	4	20	—	37
30	(Slovenia) Jernej Damjan	—	—	—	6	29	—	35

=== Nations Cup (unofficial) ===
Rank	after 9 events	Points
1	Austria	1924
2	Norway	1728
3	Finland	1475
4	Russia	973
5	Slovenia	927
6	Germany	743
7	Poland	670
8	Switzerland	467
9	Japan	353
10	Czech Republic	172
11	France	130
12	Kazakhstan	50
13	Italy	25
14	United States	15
15	Sweden	11
16	Ukraine	6
