= 2009 FIS Ski Jumping Grand Prix =

International ski jumping competition

Grand Prix 2009
Winners
- Overall: (Switzerland) Simon Ammann
- Four Nations GP: (Switzerland) Simon Ammann
- Nations Cup: Norway

Competitions
- Venues: 7
- Individual: 9
- Team: 1

The 2009 FIS Ski Jumping Grand Prix was the 16th Summer Grand Prix season in ski jumping on plastic. Season began on 8 August 2009 in Hinterzarten, Germany and ended on 3 October 2009 in Klingenthal.

Other competitive circuits this season included the World Cup and Continental Cup.

== Calendar ==
=== Men ===
Num	Season	Date	Place	Hill	Size	Winner	Second	Third	Yellow bib	Ref.
99	1	9 August 2009	(Germany) Hinterzarten	Rothaus-Schanze HS108	NH	(Switzerland) Simon Ammann	(Norway) Anders Jacobsen	(Russia) Denis Kornilov	(Switzerland) Simon Ammann	
100	2	12 August 2009	(Italy) Pragelato	Trempolino a Monte HS140	LH	(Switzerland) Simon Ammann	(Poland) Adam Małysz	(France) Emmanuel Chedal	(Switzerland) Simon Ammann	
101	3	14 August 2009	(France) Courchevel	Tremplin du Praz HS132	LH	(Switzerland) Simon Ammann	(Poland) Adam Małysz	(Czech Republic) Roman Koudelka	(Switzerland) Simon Ammann	
102	4	16 August 2009	(Switzerland) Einsiedeln	Andreas Küttel Schanze HS117	LH	(Norway) Bjørn Einar Romøren	(Japan) Daiki Ito	(Slovenia) Robert Kranjec	(Switzerland) Simon Ammann	
4th Four-Nations-Grand-Prix Overall (9–16 August 2009)						(Switzerland) Simon Ammann	(Poland) Adam Małysz	(Russia) Denis Kornilov		
103	5	22 August 2009	(Poland) Zakopane	Wielka Krokiew HS134 (night)	LH	(Austria) Gregor Schlierenzauer	(Norway) Johan Remen Evensen	(Poland) Adam Małysz	(Switzerland) Simon Ammann	
104	6	23 August 2009	(Poland) Zakopane	Wielka Krokiew HS134	LH	(Norway) Anders Jacobsen	(Austria) Gregor Schlierenzauer	(Norway) Johan Remen Evensen	(Switzerland) Simon Ammann	
105	7	29 August 2009	(Japan) Hakuba	Olympic Ski Jumps HS131 (night)	LH	(Japan) Noriaki Kasai	(Japan) Fumihisa Yumoto	(Switzerland) Simon Ammann	(Switzerland) Simon Ammann	
106	8	30 August 2009	(Japan) Hakuba	Olympic Ski Jumps HS131 (night)	LH	(Slovenia) Robert Kranjec	(Japan) Daiki Ito	(Switzerland) Simon Ammann	(Switzerland) Simon Ammann	
107	9	3 October 2009	(Germany) Vogtland Arena	Vogtlandarena HS140 (night)	LH	(Austria) Gregor Schlierenzauer	(Slovenia) Robert Kranjec	(Finland) Harri Olli	(Switzerland) Simon Ammann	

=== Men's team ===
Num	Season	Date	Place	Hill	Size	Winner	Second	Third	Yellow bib	Ref.
12	1	8 August 2009	(Germany) Hinterzarten	Rothaus-Schanze HS108 (night)	NH	Norway Bjørn Einar Romøren; Kenneth Gangnes; Anders Jacobsen; Tom Hilde	Germany Michael Neumayer; Georg Späth; Michael Uhrmann; Martin Schmitt	Finland Sami Niemi; Janne Happonen; Harri Olli; Kalle Keituri	Norway	

== Standings ==
=== Overall ===
Rank	after 9 events	Points
1	(Switzerland) Simon Ammann	537
2	(Slovenia) Robert Kranjec	477
3	(Poland) Adam Małysz	294
4	(Russia) Denis Kornilov	293
5	(Austria) Gregor Schlierenzauer	280

=== Nations Cup ===
Rank	after 10 events	Points
1	Norway	1448
2	Japan	1156
3	Austria	1005
4	Slovenia	950
5	Germany	703

=== Four Nations Grand Prix ===
Rank	after 4 events	Points
1	(Switzerland) Simon Ammann	1024.1
2	(Poland) Adam Małysz	1002.0
3	(Russia) Denis Kornilov	990.6
4	(Slovenia) Robert Kranjec	980.6
5	(Finland) Harri Olli	979.4
