= Sakano =

Sakano (written: 坂野 or 阪野, literally "slope/hill field") is a Japanese surname. Notable people with the surname include:

- Asahi Sakano (坂野 旭飛; 2005–2025), Japanese ski jumper
- Dandy Sakano (ダンディ 坂野; born 1967), Japanese comedian
- Masaru Sakano (坂野 勝; born 1942), Japanese modern pentathlete
- Toyofumi Sakano (阪野 豊史; born 1990), Japanese footballer
- Yukio Sakano (坂野 幸夫; born 1976), Japanese ski jumper

== Fictional characters ==
- Mr. Sakano, a character from the manga series Gravitation
