= Schnurr =

Schnurr may refer to:

- Dennis Marion Schnurr, American catholic prelate
- Magdalena Schnurr, German ski jumper
- Paula Schnurr, Canadian runner
- Scott Schnurr, professional wrestler who uses the name "Scotty Mac"
- Kurt Schnurr, the real name of the fictional character Airtight from the G.I. Joe franchise
