= Hrgota =

Hrgota is a South Slavic surname. Notable people with the surname include:

- Branimir Hrgota (born 1993), Swedish footballer
- Robert Hrgota (born 1988), Slovenian ski jumper
