= Fumihisa =

- Gender: Male

Origin
- Origin: Japanese
- Meaning: Different meanings depending on the kanji used

Fumihisa (written: 文久 or 史寿) is a masculine Japanese given name. Notable people with the name include:

- Fumihisa Semizuki (勢見月 文久; born 1949), Japanese sport shooter
- Fumihisa Yumoto (湯本 史寿; born 1984), Japanese ski jumper
