= 2008–09 FIS Ski Jumping World Cup =

Ski jumping championship season

2008–09 World Cup
Winners
- Overall: (Austria) Gregor Schlierenzauer
- Ski Flying: (Austria) Gregor Schlierenzauer
- Four Hills Tournament: (Austria) Wolfgang Loitzl
- Nordic Tournament: (Austria) Gregor Schlierenzauer
- FIS Team Tour: Norway
- Nations Cup: Austria

Competitions
- Venues: 20
- Individual: 27
- Team: 6
- Cancelled: 2 (1 Ind. + 1 Team)
- Rescheduled: 1

The 2008–09 FIS Ski Jumping World Cup was the 30th World Cup season in ski jumping and the 12th official World Cup season in ski flying with twelfth small crystal globe awarded.

Season began in Kuusamo, Finland on 29 November 2008 and was finished in Planica, Slovenia on 22 March 2009. The individual overall winner was Austrian ski jumper Gregor Schlierenzauer, who won 13 of the 27 individual events and with that broke Janne Ahonen's single-season record of 12 wins in a season. Schlierenzauer's 20 podiums in a single season is also a new record.

Small crystal globe in Ski Flying returned after 2000/01 season and awarded to Schlierenzauer.

A first edition of the new team competition (2 team + 3 individual events counted) was organised in Willingen, Klingenthal and Oberstdorf which was named the FIS Team Tour was also introduced this season and the winner became the Team of Norway. Gregor Schlierenzauer also won Nordic Tournament and Nations Cup went to Team of Austria.

2 events (1 individual and 1 team) were cancelled and one moved from large to normal hill.

The Nations Cup, which is determined by adding all points gained by the participants of a country, in both individual and team competitions, was won overwhelmingly by Austria with 7331 points, more than three thousand points ahead of second-placed Finland (4270 points).

== Map of world cup hosts ==
Europe
Germany	Austria Asia	Canada

== Calendar ==
=== Men's Individual ===
N – normal hill / L – large hill / F – flying hill
All	No.	Date	Place (Hill)	Size	Winner	Second	Third	Overall leader
683	1	29 November 2008	(Finland) Kuusamo (Rukatunturi HS142)	L _{472}	(Switzerland) Simon Ammann	(Austria) Wolfgang Loitzl	(Austria) Gregor Schlierenzauer	(Switzerland) Simon Ammann
684	2	6 December 2008	(Norway) Trondheim (Granåsen HS131)	L _{473}	(Austria) Gregor Schlierenzauer	(Finland) Ville Larinto	(Norway) Anders Jacobsen	(Austria) Gregor Schlierenzauer
685	3	7 December 2008	(Norway) Trondheim (Granåsen HS131)	L _{474}	(Switzerland) Simon Ammann	(Finland) Matti Hautamäki	(Austria) Gregor Schlierenzauer	(Switzerland) Simon Ammann
686	4	13 December 2008	(Italy) Pragelato (Stadio del Tramp. HS140)	L _{475}	(Switzerland) Simon Ammann	(Austria) Gregor Schlierenzauer	(Finland) Ville Larinto	(Switzerland) Simon Ammann
687	5	14 December 2008	(Italy) Pragelato (Stadio del Tramp. HS140)	L _{476}	(Japan) Fumihisa Yumoto	(Switzerland) Simon Ammann	(Norway) Johan Remen Evensen	(Switzerland) Simon Ammann
688	6	20 December 2008	(Switzerland) Engelberg (Gross-Titlis-Schanze HS137)	L _{477}	(Switzerland) Simon Ammann	(Austria) Wolfgang Loitzl	(Austria) Gregor Schlierenzauer	(Switzerland) Simon Ammann
689	7	21 December 2008	(Switzerland) Engelberg (Gross-Titlis-Schanze HS137)	L _{478}	(Austria) Gregor Schlierenzauer	(Austria) Wolfgang Loitzl	(Switzerland) Simon Ammann	(Switzerland) Simon Ammann
690	8	29 December 2008	(Germany) Oberstdorf (Schattenberg HS137)	L _{479}	(Switzerland) Simon Ammann	(Austria) Wolfgang Loitzl	(Russia) Dimitry Vassiliev	(Switzerland) Simon Ammann
691	9	1 January 2009	(Germany) Garmisch-Pa (Gr. Olympiaschanze HS140)	L _{480}	(Austria) Wolfgang Loitzl	(Switzerland) Simon Ammann	(Finland) Harri Olli	(Switzerland) Simon Ammann
692	10	4 January 2009	(Austria) Innsbruck (Bergiselschanze HS130)	L _{481}	(Austria) Wolfgang Loitzl	(Austria) Gregor Schlierenzauer	(Germany) Martin Schmitt	(Switzerland) Simon Ammann
693	11	6 January 2009	(Austria) Bischofshofen (Paul-Ausserleitner HS140)	L _{482}	(Austria) Wolfgang Loitzl	(Switzerland) Simon Ammann	(Russia) Dimitry Vassiliev	(Switzerland) Simon Ammann
57th Four Hills Tournament Overall (29 December 2008 – 6 January 2009)					(Austria) Wolfgang Loitzl	(Switzerland) Simon Ammann	(Austria) Gregor Schlierenzauer	4H Tournament
694	12	10 January 2009	(Austria) Bad Mitterndorf (Kulm HS200)	F _{070}	(Austria) Gregor Schlierenzauer	(Switzerland) Simon Ammann	(Austria) Martin Koch	(Switzerland) Simon Ammann
695	13	11 January 2009	(Austria) Bad Mitterndorf (Kulm HS200)	F _{071}	(Austria) Gregor Schlierenzauer	(Finland) Harri Olli	(Switzerland) Simon Ammann	(Switzerland) Simon Ammann
696	14	16 January 2009	(Poland) Zakopane (Wielka Krokiew HS134)	L _{483}	(Austria) Wolfgang Loitzl	(Austria) Gregor Schlierenzauer	(Germany) Martin Schmitt	(Switzerland) Simon Ammann
697	15	17 January 2009	(Poland) Zakopane (Wielka Krokiew HS134)	L _{484}	(Austria) Gregor Schlierenzauer	(Austria) Wolfgang Loitzl	(Switzerland) Simon Ammann	(Switzerland) Simon Ammann
698	16	24 January 2009	(Canada) Whistler (Wh. Olympic Park HS140)	L _{485}	(Austria) Gregor Schlierenzauer	(Austria) Wolfgang Loitzl	(Finland) Matti Hautamäki	(Austria) Gregor Schlierenzauer
699	17	25 January 2009	(Canada) Whistler (Wh. Olympic Park HS140)	L _{486}	(Austria) Gregor Schlierenzauer	(Austria) Thomas Morgenstern	(Finland) Ville Larinto	(Austria) Gregor Schlierenzauer
700	18	31 January 2009	(Japan) Sapporo (Ōkurayama HS134)	L _{487}	(Austria) Gregor Schlierenzauer	(Austria) Thomas Morgenstern	(Austria) Wolfgang Loitzl	(Austria) Gregor Schlierenzauer
		1 February 2009	(Japan) Sapporo (Ōkurayama HS134)	L _{cnx}	cancelled due to strong wind			—
701	19	8 February 2009	(Germany) Willingen (Mühlenkopfschanze HS145)	L _{488}	(Austria) Gregor Schlierenzauer	(Switzerland) Simon Ammann	(Japan) Noriaki Kasai	(Austria) Gregor Schlierenzauer
702	20	11 February 2009	(Germany) Klingenthal (Vogtland Arena HS140)	L _{489}	(Austria) Gregor Schlierenzauer	(Norway) Anders Jacobsen	(Austria) Wolfgang Loitzl	(Austria) Gregor Schlierenzauer
703	21	14 February 2009	(Germany) Oberstdorf (Heini-Klopfer HS213)	F _{072}	(Finland) Harri Olli	(Norway) Anders Jacobsen	(Norway) Johan Remen Evensen	(Austria) Gregor Schlierenzauer
1st FIS Team Tour Overall; TWO TEAM EVENTS INCLUDED (7 – 15 February 2009)					Norway	Austria	Finland	FIS Team Tour
FIS Nordic World Ski Championships 2009 (27 – 27 February • (Czech Republic) Liberec)
		8 March 2009	(Finland) Lahti (Salpausselkä HS130) (Salpausselkä HS97)	L _{cnx}	moved to normal hill due to strong wind			—
704	22	8 March 2009	(Finland) Lahti (Salpausselkä HS130) (Salpausselkä HS97)	N _{143}	(Austria) Gregor Schlierenzauer	(Switzerland) Simon Ammann	(Russia) Dimitry Vassiliev	(Austria) Gregor Schlierenzauer
705	23	10 March 2009	(Finland) Kuopio (Puijo HS127)	L _{490}	(Japan) Takanobu Okabe	(Switzerland) Simon Ammann	(Poland) Adam Małysz	(Austria) Gregor Schlierenzauer
706	24	13 March 2009	(Norway) Lillehammer (Lysgårdsbakken HS138)	L _{491}	(Finland) Harri Olli	(Russia) Dimitry Vassiliev	(Austria) Gregor Schlierenzauer	(Austria) Gregor Schlierenzauer
707	25	15 March 2009	(Norway) Vikersund (Vikersundbakken HS207)	F _{073}	(Austria) Gregor Schlierenzauer	(Switzerland) Simon Ammann	(Russia) Dimitry Vassiliev	(Austria) Gregor Schlierenzauer
13th Nordic Tournament Overall (3 – 9 March 2008)					(Austria) Gregor Schlierenzauer	(Finland) Harri Olli	(Switzerland) Simon Ammann	Nordic Tournament
708	26	20 March 2009	(Slovenia) Planica (Letalnica b. Gorišek HS215)	F _{074}	(Austria) Gregor Schlierenzauer	(Poland) Adam Małysz	(Russia) Dimitry Vassiliev	(Austria) Gregor Schlierenzauer
709	27	22 March 2009	(Slovenia) Planica (Letalnica b. Gorišek HS215)	F _{075}	(Finland) Harri Olli	(Poland) Adam Małysz	(Switzerland) Simon Ammann (Slovenia) Robert Kranjec	(Austria) Gregor Schlierenzauer
30th FIS World Cup Overall (29 November 2008 – 22 March 2009)					(Austria) Gregor Schlierenzauer	(Switzerland) Simon Ammann	(Austria) Wolfgang Loitzl	World Cup Overall

=== Men's Team ===
All	No.	Date	Place (Hill)	Size	Winner	Second	Third
		28 November 2008	(Finland) Kuusamo (Rukatunturi HS142)	L _{cnx}	cancelled after two groups jumped in 1st round due to strong wind		
40	1	29 November 2008	(Finland) Kuusamo (Rukatunturi HS142)	L _{034}	Finland Ville Larinto; Kalle Keituri; Harri Olli; Matti Hautamäki	Austria Wolfgang Loitzl; Martin Koch; Gregor Schlierenzauer; Thomas Morgenstern	Germany Felix Schoft; Michael Uhrmann; Martin Schmitt; Michael Neumayer
41	2	7 February 2009	(Germany) Willingen (Mühlenkopfschanze HS145)	L _{035}	Austria Thomas Morgenstern; Markus Eggenhofer; Andreas Kofler; Wolfgang Loitzl	Norway Roar Ljøkelsøy; Tom Hilde; Anders Bardal; Anders Jacobsen	Finland Ville Larinto; Kalle Keituri; Matti Hautamäki; Harri Olli
42	3	15 February 2009	(Germany) Oberstdorf (Heini-Klopfer HS213)	F _{006}	Finland Kalle Keituri; Juha-Matti Ruuskanen; Matti Hautamäki; Harri Olli	Russia Denis Kornilov; Pavel Karelin; Ilya Rosliakov; Dimitry Vassiliev	Austria Wolfgang Loitzl; Markus Eggenhofer; Andreas Kofler; Martin Koch
1st FIS Team Tour Overall; THREE INDIVIDUAL EVENTS INCLUDED (7 – 15 February 2009)					Norway	Austria	Finland
43	4	7 March 2009	(Finland) Lahti (Salpausselkä HS130)	L _{036}	Austria Wolfgang Loitzl; Martin Koch; Thomas Morgenstern; Gregor Schlierenzauer	Finland Ville Larinto; Kalle Keituri; Harri Olli; Matti Hautamäki	Norway Anders Bardal; Tom Hilde; Johan Remen Evensen; Anders Jacobsen
44	5	14 March 2009	(Norway) Vikersund (Vikersundbakken HS207)	F _{007}	Austria Martin Koch; Wolfgang Loitzl; Thomas Morgenstern; Gregor Schlierenzauer	Finland Matti Hautamäki; Kalle Keituri; Ville Larinto; Harri Olli	Norway Johan Remen Evensen; Bjørn Einar Romøren; Anders Bardal; Anders Jacobsen
45	6	21 March 2009	(Slovenia) Planica (Letalnica b. Gorišek HS215)	F _{008}	Norway Johan Remen Evensen; Tom Hilde; Anders Bardal; Anders Jacobsen	Poland Kamil Stoch; Łukasz Rutkowski; Stefan Hula; Adam Małysz	Russia Denis Kornilov; Pavel Karelin; Ilya Rosliakov; Dimitry Vassiliev

== Standings ==
=== Overall ===
Rank	after 27 events	Points
1	(Austria) Gregor Schlierenzauer	2083
2	(Switzerland) Simon Ammann	1776
3	(Austria) Wolfgang Loitzl	1396
4	(Finland) Harri Olli	974
5	(Russia) Dmitriy Vassiliev	845
6	(Germany) Martin Schmitt	829
7	(Austria) Thomas Morgenstern	795
8	(Norway) Anders Jacobsen	661
9	(Austria) Martin Koch	601
10	(Norway) Anders Bardal	598

=== Nations Cup ===
Rank	after 33 events	Points
1	Austria	7331
2	Finland	4270
3	Norway	4175
4	Germany	3134
5	Russia	2345
6	Switzerland	2337
7	Japan	2044
8	Poland	1574
9	Slovenia	1319
10	Czech Republic	1048

=== Prize money ===
Rank	after 33 events	Points
1	(Austria) Gregor Schlierenzauer	524,500
2	(Switzerland) Simon Ammann	334,000
3	(Austria) Wolfgang Loitzl	274,000
4	(Finland) Harri Olli	172,600
5	(Russia) Dmitriy Vassiliev	95,000
6	(Austria) Thomas Morgenstern	89,500
7	(Norway) Anders Jacobsen	84,050
8	(Finland) Ville Larinto	71,000
9	(Finland) Matti Hautamäki	70,500
10	(Poland) Adam Małysz	61,500

=== Ski Flying ===
Rank	after 6 events	Points
1	(Austria) Gregor Schlierenzauer	477
2	(Finland) Harri Olli	372
3	(Switzerland) Simon Ammann	370
4	(Austria) Martin Koch	221
5	(Norway) Anders Jacobsen	220
6	(Russia) Dmitriy Vassiliev	200
7	(Poland) Adam Małysz	192
	(Slovenia) Robert Kranjec	192
9	(Finland) Matti Hautamäki	156
10	(Norway) Anders Bardal	143

=== Four Hills Tournament ===
Rank	after 4 events	Points
1	(Austria) Wolfgang Loitzl	1123.7
2	(Switzerland) Simon Ammann	1091.1
3	(Austria) Gregor Schlierenzauer	1077.1
4	(Germany) Martin Schmitt	1055.2
5	(Russia) Dmitriy Vassiliev	1048.1
6	(Norway) Anders Jacobsen	1027.9
7	(Finland) Harri Olli	1019.2
8	(Austria) Thomas Morgenstern	1001.0
9	(Finland) Matti Hautamäki	991.4
10	(Germany) Michael Neumayer	986.3

=== Nordic Tournament ===
Rank	after 4 events	Points
1	(Austria) Gregor Schlierenzauer	1114.9
2	(Finland) Harri Olli	1114.3
3	(Switzerland) Simon Ammann	1095.0
4	(Russia) Dmitriy Vassiliev	1086.9
5	(Poland) Adam Małysz	1066.9
6	(Germany) Martin Schmitt	1056.4
7	(Austria) Wolfgang Loitzl	1037.4
8	(Austria) Thomas Morgenstern	1019.6
9	(Austria) Martin Koch	1013.9
10	(Finland) Matti Hautamäki	1012.0

=== FIS Team Tour ===
Rank	after 4 events	Points
1	Norway	4083.8
2	Austria	4032.2
3	Finland	3960.4
4	Germany	3547.7
5	Russia	3511.3
6	Czech Republic	3201.5
7	Slovenia	2418.0
8	Japan	2122.2
9	Switzerland	1796.0
10	Kazakhstan	1787.0

== See also ==
- 2008 Grand Prix (top level summer series)
- 2008–09 FIS Continental Cup (2nd level competition)
