= FIS Junior Ski Jumping World Championships 2009 =

The FIS Junior Ski Jumping World Championships 2009 (JWSC) (part of 2009 Nordic Junior World Ski Championships) is a ski jumping World Championship for juniors (age 15–20). It took place in Strbske Pleso, Slovakia, from February 2 until February 8, 2009. The competition took place on Strbske Pleso's MS 1970 B-hill which has a hill size of 100 meters, and the k-point at 90 meters. The hill record as of February 7, 2009, was 101.5 meters and held by Russian Roman Trofimov in 2008.

== Results ==
=== Ladies individual competition ===
- Winner - Magdalena Schnurr (Germany)
- 2nd place - Anna Haefele (Germany)
- 3rd place - Coline Mattel (France)
- 4th place - Naata de Leeuw (Canada)
- 5th place - Jacqueline Seifriedsberger (Austria)

=== Men's individual competition ===
- Winner - Lukas Müller (Austria)
- 2nd place - Maciej Kot (Poland)
- 3rd place - Ville Larinto (Finland)
- 4th place - Pascal Bodmer (Germany)
- 5th place - Čestmír Kožíšek (Czech Republic)

=== Men's team competition ===
- Winner - Austria
- 2nd place - Germany
- 3rd place - Poland
