= Juha-Matti Ruuskanen =

Finnish ski jumper

Personal information
- Full name: Juha-Matti Ruuskanen
- Nationality: Finland
- Born: 24 July 1984 (age 41) Kuopio, Finland

Sport
- Sport: Skiing

World Cup career
- Seasons: 2003–2007; 2009–2011
- Team podiums: 1
- Team wins: 1

Achievements and titles
- Personal bests: 190.5 m (625 ft); Vikersund, 7 Mar 2004
- Updated on 26 May 2015

Juha-Matti Ruuskanen (born 24 July 1984) is a Finnish former ski jumper who competed from 2002 to 2012, mainly at Continental Cup level. His lone World Cup victory was in a team event at the ski flying hill in Oberstdorf on 15 February 2009.
