= Asahi Sakano =

Japanese ski jumper (2005–2025)

Asahi Sakano (坂野 旭飛, Sakano Asahi; 13 August 2005 – 1 July 2025) was a Japanese ski jumper.

== Early life and career ==
Sakano was born in Sapporo on 13 August 2005. He made his debut in February 2022 at the FIS Cup in Vilach, finishing 16th and 35th. In March, he competed at the 2022 World Junior Championships in Zakopane, where he took 17th place individually, 6th in the men's team and 4th in the mixed doubles. He then made his Continental Cup debut in the same town, finishing 48th, 36th and 41st.

At the 2024 World Junior Championships, he finished 24th individually, 11th in the men's team and 8th in the mixed team. On 17 February 2024, he made his World Cup debut, finishing in 49th place in the competition in Sapporo. He competed for the second time in the World Cup a day later, taking 47th place.

== Death ==
Sakano died on 1 July 2025, at the age of 19, after falling from the third floor of a building in Sapporo's Chūō district. His death was announced by his ski club, Snow Brand Megmilk.
