= Roberto Dellasega =

Italian ski jumper

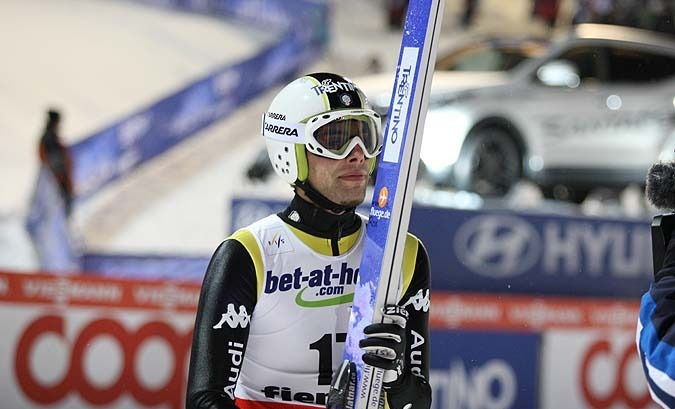
- Roberto Dellasega in 2013

Personal information
- Nationality: Italy
- Born: June 15, 1990 (age 36) Cavalese, Italy

Sport
- Sport: Skiing

World Cup career
- Seasons: 2009–2018
- Indiv. starts: 22
- Team starts: 21
- Updated on 15 July 2025

Roberto Dellasega (born 15 June 1990) is an Italian former ski jumper who competed from 2006 to 2018. At the 2010 Winter Olympics, he finished 44th in the qualifying round of the individual large hill event while being disqualified in the individual normal hill event.

Dellasega, born in Cavalese, placed third in the large hill event of the 2009 Italian championships of ski jumping. His best World Cup finish was ninth in a team large hill event at Germany in 2010 while his best individual finish was 29th in an individual large hill event at Japan that same year.
