= David Unterberger =

Austrian ski jumper (born 1988)

David Unterberger (born 23 September 1988 in Bad Ischl, Austria), is an Austrian ski jumper who competes for Austria and the club SV Bad Goisern.

His best placement in the World Cup is a 40th place in Bischofshofen 2010. He won the Universiade in Yabuli 2009.

He is the winner of 2009/2010 Continental Cup. In that season he was on podium 12 times (6 wins, 3 second places, 3 third places). The beginning of the season wasn't very good for him: he finished 64th and 33rd in Rovaniemi.
