= Julian Musiol =

German ski jumper

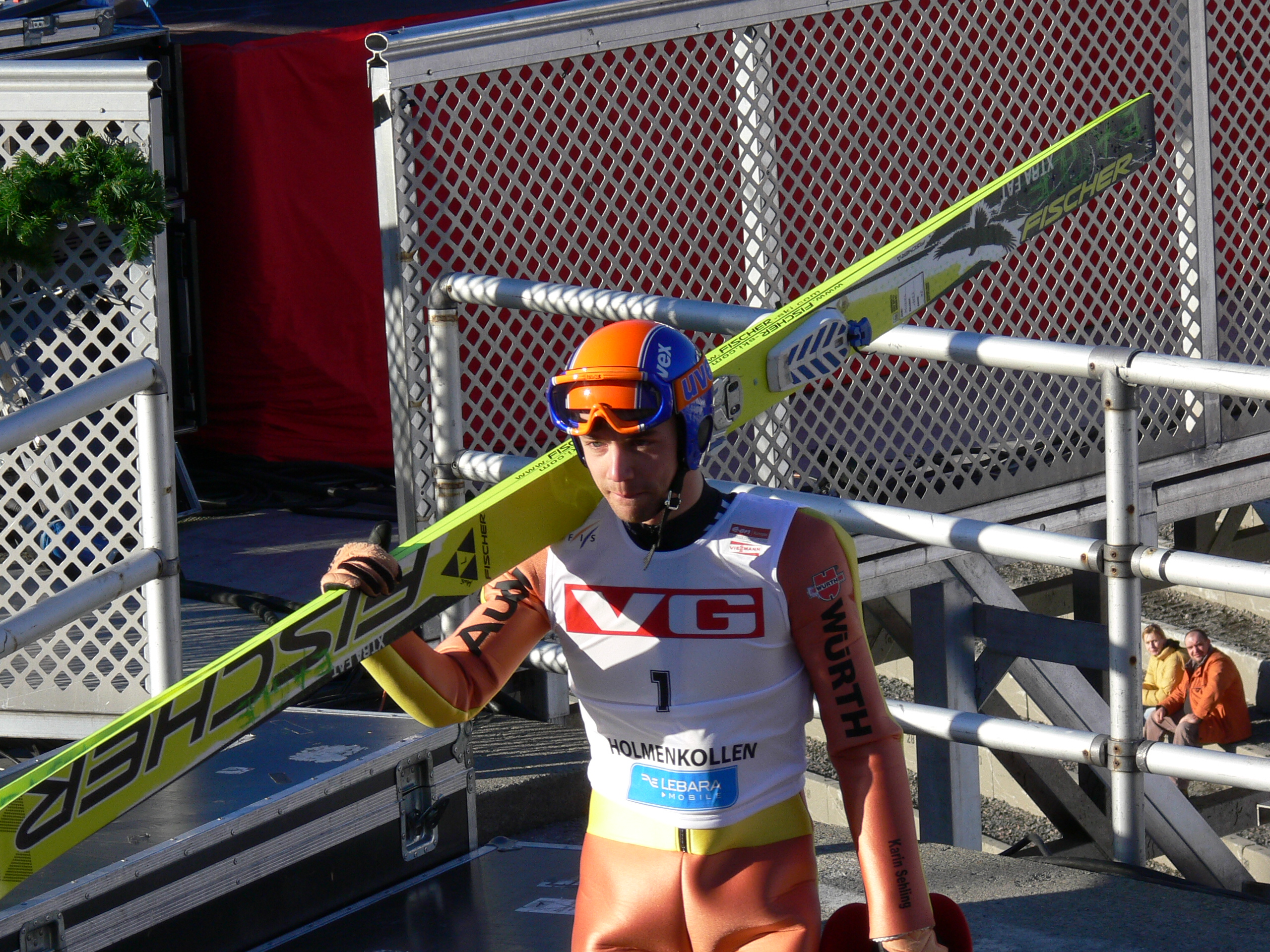

Personal information
- Born: 4 April 1986 (age 40) Suhl, East Germany

Sport
- Sport: Skiing
- Club: SCM Zella-Mehlis

World Cup career
- Seasons: 2005–present
- Indiv. wins: 0
- Updated on 1 February 2009

Julian Musiol (born 4 April 1986) is a German ski jumper of Polish descent (by his father).

He made his Continental Cup debut in January 2003, his best result being the victories from Oberhof, Germany in February 2007 and Kranj in January 2009. He finished fifth in the normal hill at the 2004 Junior World Ski Championships. He made his World Cup debut in December 2005 in Oberstdorf, his best result being two 22nd places from Sapporo in January 2006 and January 2009.

He was born in Suhl, but hails from Zella-Mehlis. He is the son of Bogdan Musioł and is trained by Heinz Kuttin.
