= Magdalena Schnurr =

German ski jumper

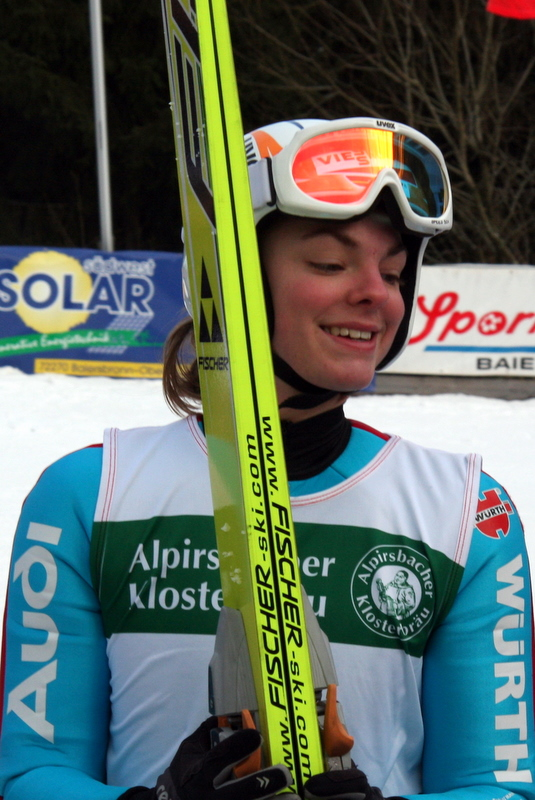

Personal information
- Born: 25 March 1992 (age 34) Baden-Baden, Germany

Sport
- Sport: Skiing
- Club: Sc Baiersbronn

World Cup career
- Seasons: 2005-
- Indiv. podiums: 8
- Indiv. wins: 4
- Updated on February 2009

Magdalena Schnurr (born 25 March 1992 in Baden-Baden) is a German ski jumper. She won the FIS Junior Ski Jumping World Championships 2009 in Štrbské Pleso. She finished in seventh place in the World Championship 2009 in Liberec. She has four wins from the Ladies Continental Cup in ski jumping (the highest level).
