= Lukas Müller (ski jumper) =

Austrian ski jumper

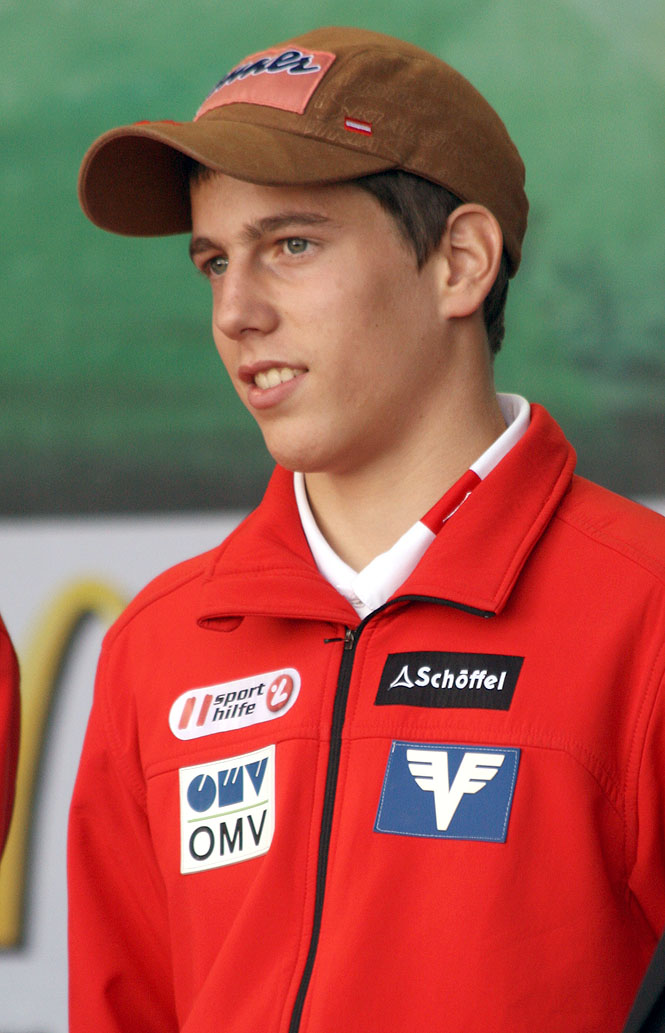
- Müller in 2009

Personal information
- Nationality: Austria
- Born: 14 March 1992 (age 34) Austria

Sport
- Sport: Skiing

World Cup career
- Seasons: 2009–2010; 2012–2013
- Indiv. starts: 16
- Updated on 18 Jan 2016

Lukas Müller (born 14 March 1992) is an Austrian former ski jumper who competed from 2007 to 2016.

== Biography ==
He won the normal hill competition at the 2009 Junior Ski Jumping World Championships. In 2016 he reached a peak position of fifth in the men's Continental Cup standings.

His career was cut short after a violent crash during a training round at the Kulm ski flying hill on 13 January 2016. He suffered serious spinal injuries and an incomplete paralysis of the legs, and later underwent surgery for his lower spine.

== Accomplishments ==
- Winner of the FIS Junior Ski Jumping World Championships in Strbske Pleso on 2–8 February 2009
- Winner of both days of the COC competition in Iron Mountain on 14–15 February 2009
