= Stadio del Trampolino =

Ski jumping hill in Pragelato, Italy

Coordinates: 45°0′24.67″N 6°56′27.67″E

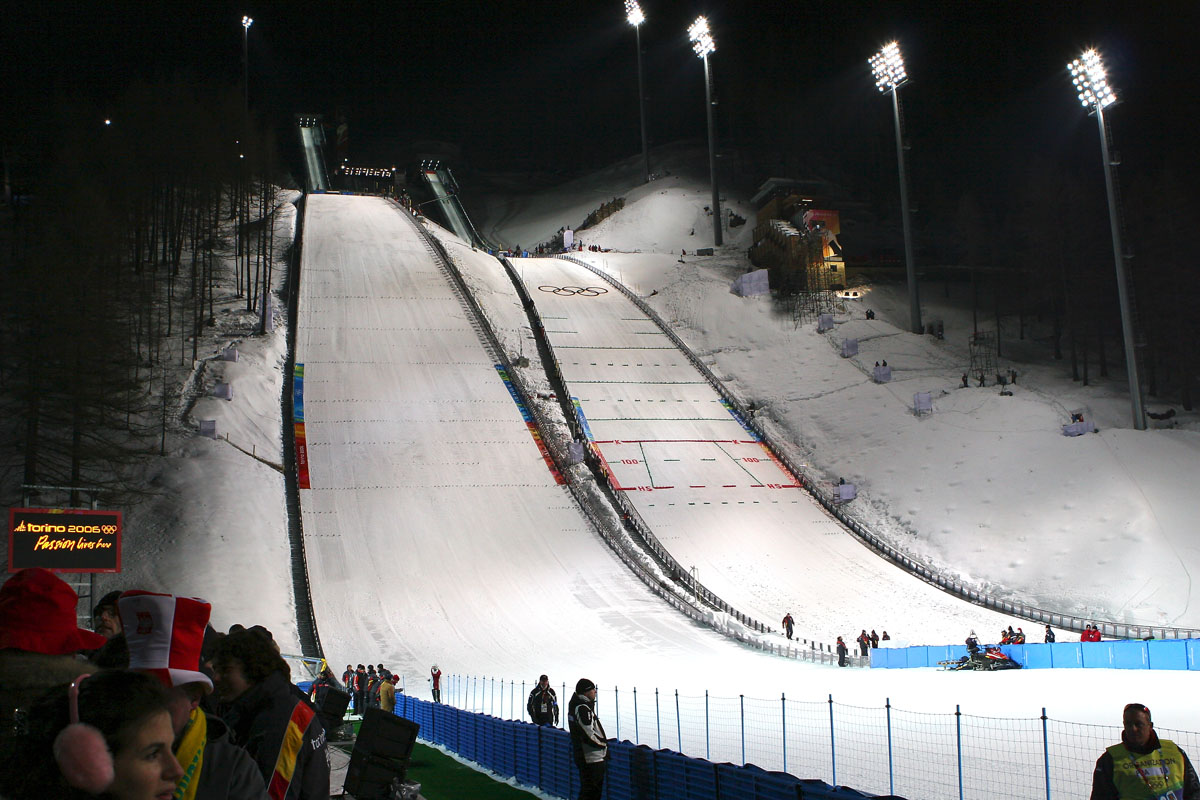
- Location: Pragelato; Italy
- Opened: 2004

Size
- K–point: K-95; K-125
- Hill size: HS106; HS140
- Hill record: (Russia) Dimitry Vassiliev & (Germany) Michael Uhrmann (104.5 in 2006) (Switzerland) Simon Ammann (144 m in 2008)

Top events
- Olympics: 2006 Winter Olympics

Stadio del Trampolino was a ski jumping hill located in Pragelato, Italy. During the 2006 Winter Olympics, it hosted the ski jumping and the ski jumping part of the Nordic combined events. It also hosted FIS Ski Jumping World Cup events in the 2004–05 and 2008–09 seasons. The construction costs of the venue exceeded €34 million.

Both big jumps were abandoned in 2010 due to high operational costs, only junior jumps (K60, K30 and K15) were used until 2017. In 2026 the venue is to be redeveloped for biathlon and roller skiing.
