= Kai Kovaljeff =

Finnish ski jumper and Nordic combined athlete

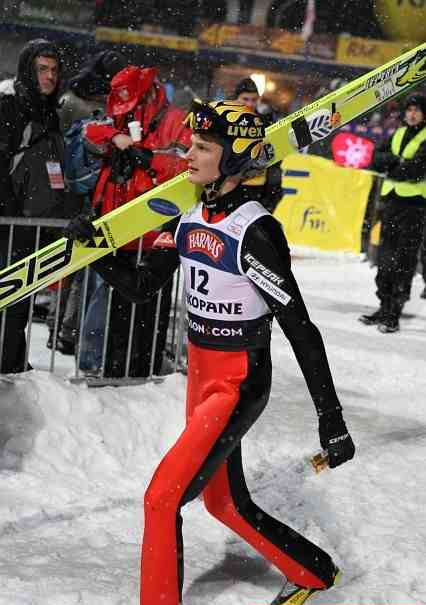
- Kovaljeff during FIS Ski Jumping World Cup in Zakopane, 2009

Personal information
- Born: 8 August 1985 (age 41) Tampere, Finland

Sport
- Sport: Skiing
- Club: Lieksan Hiihtoseura

World Cup career
- Seasons: 2009-present
- Indiv. wins: 0
- Updated on 19 January 2008

Kai Kovaljeff (born 8 August 1985 in Tampere) is a Finnish ski jumper.

He made his Continental Cup debut in September 2007, his best result being a seventh place from Villach in September 2007. He made his World Cup debut in January 2009 in Zakopane, and collected his first World Cup points with a 21st place in that race. At the end of the month in Sapporo he finished 16th. His next World Cup points came in the 2009–10 FIS Ski Jumping World Cup opener, with a 29th place in Kuusamo.
