= Markus Eggenhofer =

Austrian ski jumper

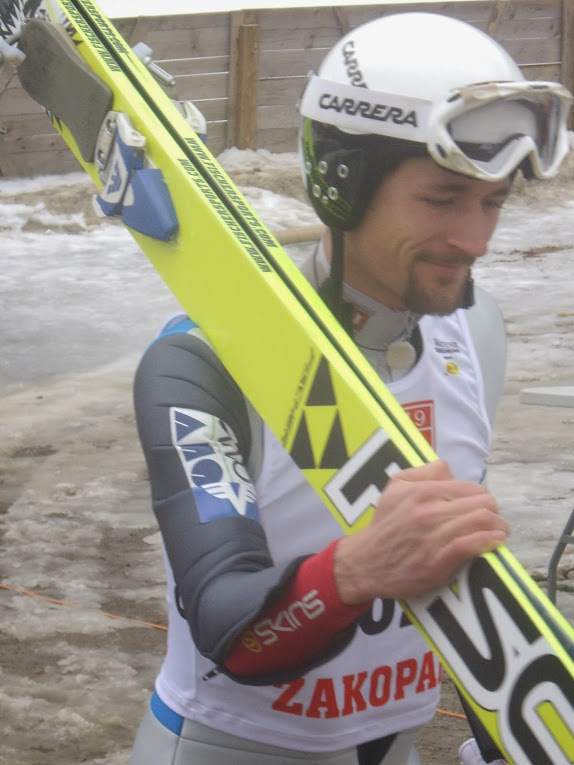
Markus Eggenhofer

Markus Eggenhofer (born 11 December 1987 in Radstadt) is an Austrian ski jumper. Eggenhofer was promoted from the Austrian "B" team to the World Cup roster ahead of the 2008–09 season, after winning the FIS Cup the season before. He made his World Cup debut in Kuusamo, Finland on 29 November 2008, where he finished in 25th place. His best individual result to date is the 8th-place finish in Engelberg, Switzerland on 20 December 2008.
