= Florian Schabereiter =

Austrian ski jumper (born 1991)

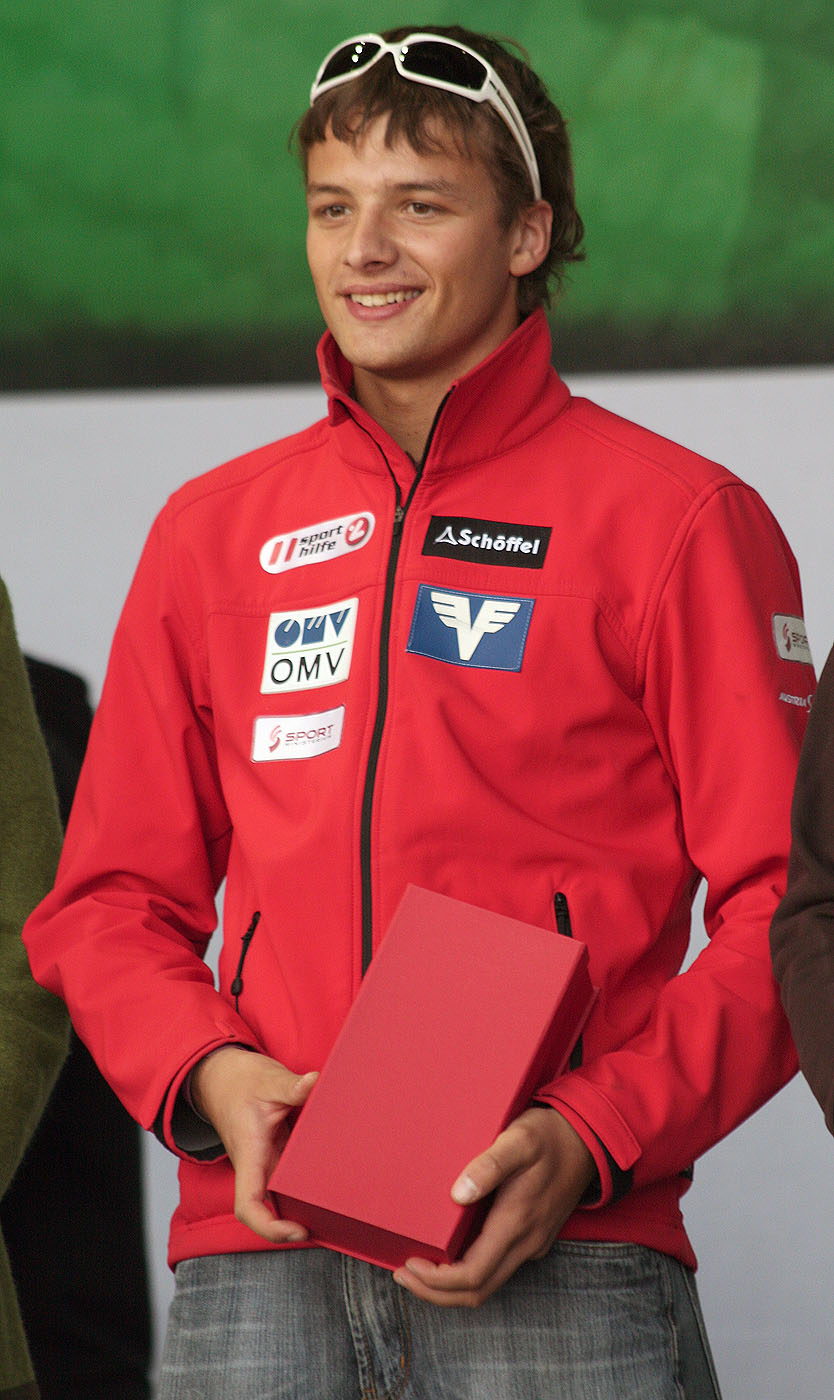
Florian Schabereiter

Florian Schabereiter (born 10 February 1991) is an Austrian ski jumper who has competed since 2006. He finished third in the team event in Willingen in February 2010 and also finished 26th in the individual large hill event at that same venue.

Schabereiter has three career victories in lesser events, including one individual normal hill event in Austria in December 2009.
