= Yukio Sakano =

Japanese ski jumper (born 1976)

Personal information
- Born: 3 February 1976 (age 50)

Sport
- Sport: Skiing
- Club: Snow Brand Ski Team

World Cup career
- Seasons: 1997; 2001-2003; 2005-2006
- Indiv. wins: 0

Yukio Sakano (坂野 幸夫, Sakano Yukio; born 3 February 1976) is a Japanese ski jumper.

In the World Cup his highest place was number 11 from January 2006 in Sapporo.
