= Pavel Karelin =

Russian ski jumper (1990–2011)

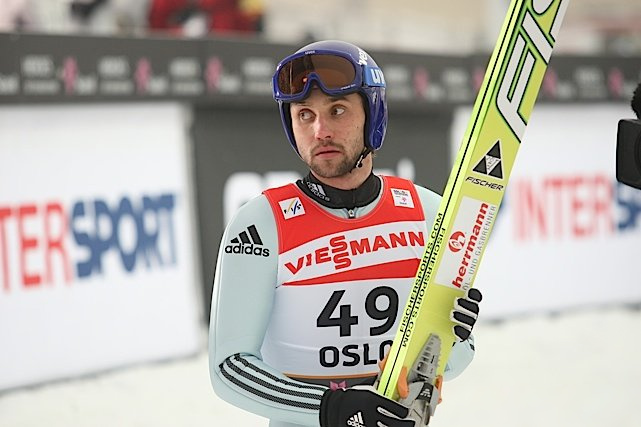
Pavel Karelin (2011)

Pavel Vladimirovich Karelin (27 April 1990 – 9 October 2011) was a Russian ski jumper from Nizhny Novgorod who competed from 2004 until his death in 2011. He made his World Cup debut on 30 November 2007, finishing 8th in team large hill event at Kuusamo, Finland. During the 2010 Winter Olympics in Vancouver, he finished tenth in the team large hill, 33rd in the individual normal hill, and 38th in the individual large hill events.

At the FIS Nordic World Ski Championships 2009, Karelin finished ninth in the team large hill and 34th in the individual large hill events.

His best World Cup finish was second in Garmisch-Partenkirchen on 1 January 2011 during the 2010–11 Four Hills Tournament, making him the second Russian ski jumper, in post-Soviet era, to manage a podium position; the first was Dimitry Vassiliev who also scored his first podium place, with a second, on 1 January in Garmisch-Partenkirchen, in 2001.

Karelin died in a car accident on 9 October 2011 in Nizhny Novgorod. He was 21.
