= Tobias Bogner =

German ski jumper

Personal information
- Full name: Tobias Bogner
- Nickname: Bogi
- Born: 28 May 1990 (age 36) Sonthofen, Germany

Sport
- Sport: Skiing
- Club: SK Berchtesgaden

World Cup career
- Seasons: 2007-
- Indiv. podiums: 0
- Indiv. wins: 0

Tobias Bogner (born 28 May 1990) is a German ski jumper. He debuted in the World Cup in the team competition in Willingen on 11 February 2007.
