= Fumihisa Yumoto =

Japanese former ski jumper (born 1984)

Fumihisa Yumoto 湯本 史寿
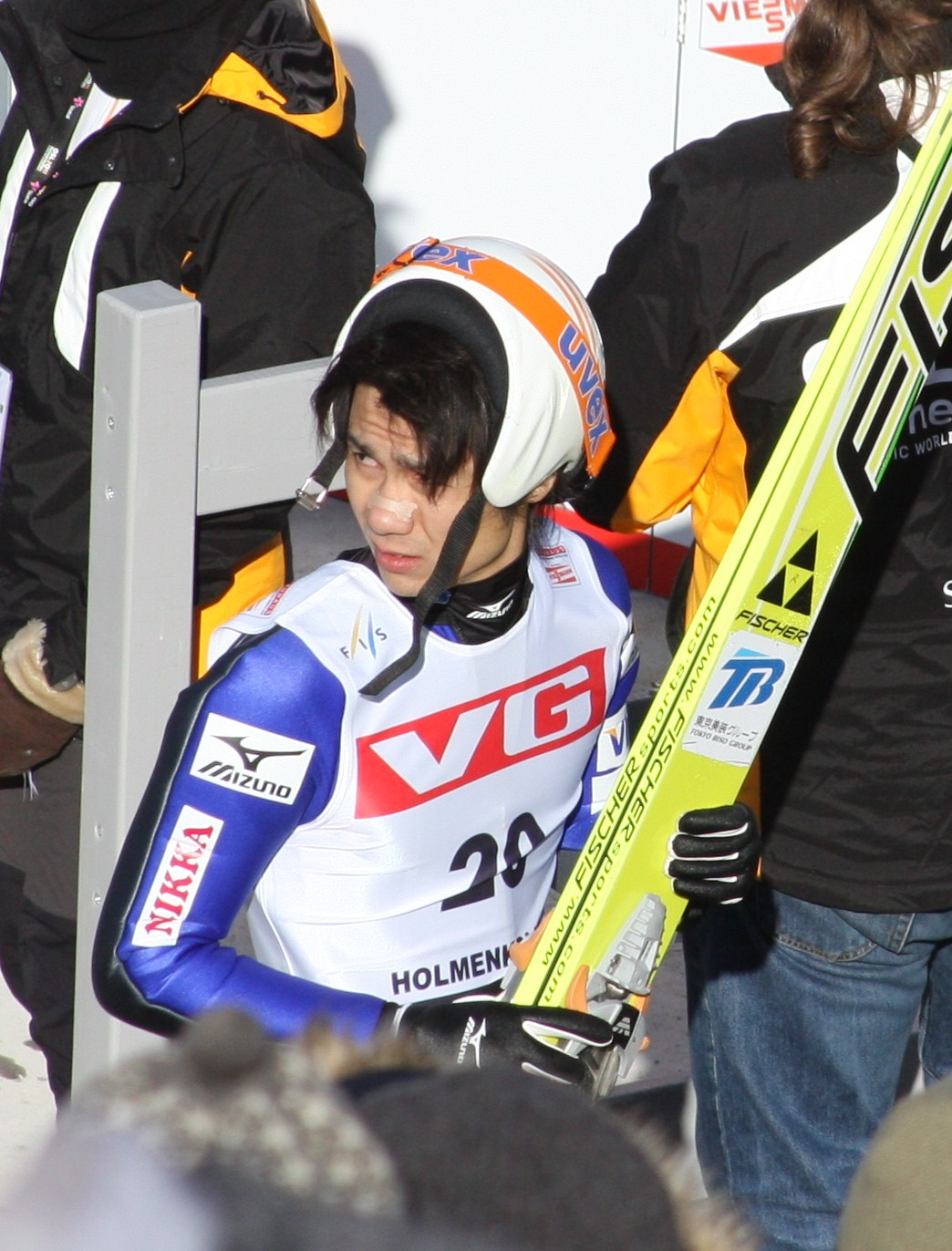

Personal information
- Full name: 湯本 史寿
- Nationality: Japan
- Born: 23 April 1984 (age 42) Kijimadaira, Honshu, Japan
- Height: 1.72 m (5 ft 7 1/2 in)

Sport
- Sport: Skiing

World Cup career
- Seasons: 2003; 2005; 2008–2012
- Indiv. starts: 63
- Indiv. podiums: 1
- Indiv. wins: 1
- Team starts: 6

Achievements and titles
- Personal bests: 203 m (666 ft); Vikersund, 13 February 2011
- Updated on 10 February 2015

Fumihisa Yumoto (湯本 史寿, Yumoto Fumihisa) (born 23 April 1984) is a Japanese former ski jumper.

== Career ==
Yumoto made his World Cup debut in Sapporo in 2003, but did not become a regular member of the Japanese World Cup team until the 2007/08 season, where his best result was a 22nd-place finish at Sapporo. On 29 November 2008, at Kuusamo, Finland, Yumoto got his first Top 10 finish in a World Cup event, when he finished in 8th place. On 14 December 2008, he got his first career victory, when he won the event at Pragelato, Italy in heavy snow conditions.

== World Cup ==
=== Standings ===
Season	Overall	4H	SF	NT
2002/03	—	—	N/A	—
2004/05	70	—	N/A	—
2007/08	58	63	N/A	45
2008/09	26	23	—	36
2009/10	38	63	—	37
2010/11	42	—	43	N/A
2011/12	71	—	—	N/A

=== Wins ===
No.	Season	Date	Location	Hill	Size
1	2008/09	14 December 2008	(Italy) Pragelato	Trampolino a Monte HS140	LH
