= Dmitriy Vassiliev =

Russian ski jumper (born 1979)

Dimitry Vassiliev Дмитрий Васильев
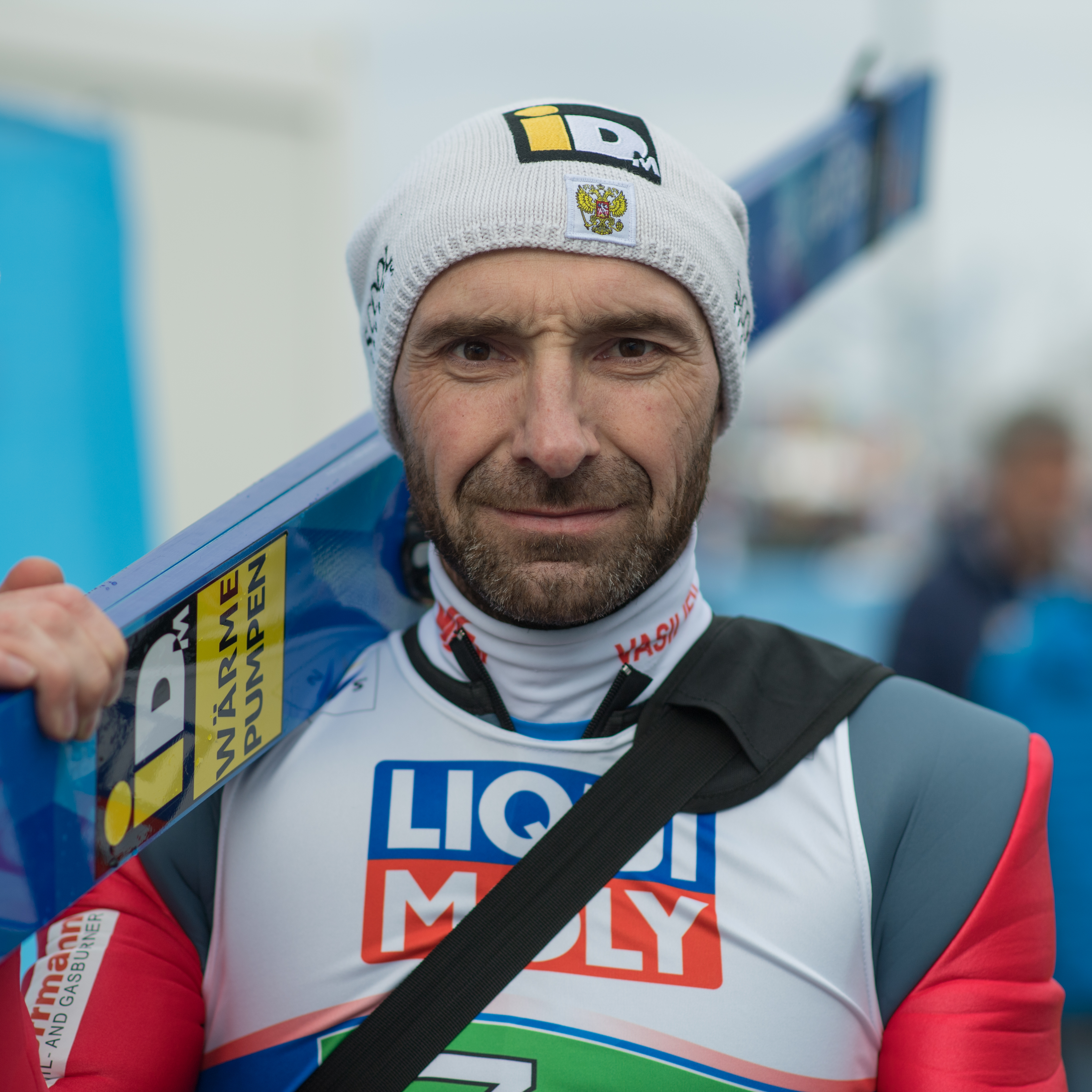
- Vassiliev in 2019

Personal information
- Full name: Dmitri Viktorovich Vassiliev
- Nationality: Russia
- Born: 26 December 1979 (age 46) Ufa, Bashkir ASSR, Soviet Union
- Height: 1.78 m (5 ft 10 in)

Sport
- Sport: Skiing
- Club: CSKA/Lokomotiv Ufa

World Cup career
- Seasons: 1999–2001; 2003–2015; 2018–2021
- Indiv. starts: 243
- Indiv. podiums: 9
- Team starts: 43
- Team podiums: 3

Achievements and titles
- Personal bests: 233.5 m (766 ft); Vikersund, 14 February 2015
- Updated on 8 January 2022

Dimitry Viktorovich Vassiliev (Russian: Дмитрий Викторович Васильев, born 26 December 1979) is a Russian former ski jumper who has competed at World Cup level from 1998 to 2021.

== World Cup career ==
Vassiliev made his World Cup debut in the 1998/99 season. His best individual finish is second in Garmisch-Partenkirchen on 1 January 2001, and he has total of nine individual podiums and three team podiums as of January 2018.

His best finish at the Ski Jumping World Championships is fifth in the normal hill team competition in Oberstdorf on 20 February 2005, while his best individual finish is seventh in the large hill competition in Sapporo on 24 February 2007.

In the Ski Flying World Championships, his best finish is seventh in the team competitions in 2004 and 2006.

In the Winter Olympics, his best finish is eighth in the team competition and tenth in the individual normal hill competition in Pragelato on 12 February 2006.

=== Near-world record ===
On 15 February 2015 in Vikersund, Vassiliev flew to a distance of 254 m (833 ft) but crashed hard onto near-flat ground. Despite not being an official ski flying world record, this remains the furthest distance ever reached in a FIS-sanctioned ski flying competition as of March 2025.

=== Summer world record ===
On 15 October 2016, Vassiliev jumped 147.5 m (484 ft) in Sochi at the Russian National Championships, improving the five-year-old summer world record on a plastic surface.

== Doping scandal ==
In 2001, during the Four Hills Tournament, Vassiliev tested positive for the substance Furosemide, which is a banned diuretic. He subsequently received a two-year ban from ski jumping.

== World Cup results ==
Season	Overall	4H	SF	RA	W5	T5	P7	NT	JP
1998/99	—	—	—	—	N/A	N/A	N/A	N/A	—
1999/00	42	37	—	—	N/A	N/A	N/A	N/A	42
2000/01	33	28	—	—	N/A	N/A	N/A	N/A	N/A
2002/03	53	72	N/A	—	N/A	N/A	N/A	N/A	N/A
2003/04	59	43	N/A	—	N/A	N/A	N/A	N/A	N/A
2004/05	29	12	N/A	61	N/A	N/A	N/A	N/A	N/A
2005/06	22	14	N/A	18	N/A	N/A	N/A	N/A	N/A
2006/07	11	10	N/A	9	N/A	N/A	N/A	N/A	N/A
2007/08	18	5	N/A	47	N/A	N/A	N/A	N/A	N/A
2008/09	5	5	6	4	N/A	N/A	N/A	N/A	N/A
2009/10	28	24	—	—	N/A	N/A	N/A	N/A	N/A
2010/11	75	—	—	N/A	N/A	N/A	N/A	N/A	N/A
2011/12	39	21	46	N/A	N/A	N/A	N/A	N/A	N/A
2012/13	22	7	—	N/A	N/A	N/A	N/A	N/A	N/A
2013/14	40	—	—	N/A	N/A	N/A	N/A	N/A	N/A
2014/15	34	15	22	N/A	N/A	N/A	N/A	N/A	N/A
2016/17	58	46	34	—	N/A	N/A	N/A	N/A	N/A
2017/18	69	66	—	—	34	N/A	—	N/A	N/A
2018/19	49	—	42	27	—	N/A	45	N/A	N/A
2019/20	66	55	—	—	—	45	N/A	N/A	N/A

== Invalid ski jumping world record ==
The longest ski jump in history.

Date	Hill	Location	Metres	Feet
15 February 2015	Vikersundbakken HS240	Vikersund, Norway	254	833

Not recognized. Crash at world record distance.
