= Robert Hrgota =

Slovenian former ski jumper

Personal information
- Born: 2 August 1988 (age 37) Celje, SFR Yugoslavia

Sport
- Sport: Skiing
- Club: SSK Velenje

World Cup career
- Seasons: 2007–2014
- Indiv. starts: 17

Achievements and titles
- Personal bests: 210 m (688 ft); Planica, 2009
- Updated on 23 December 2016

Robert Hrgota (born 2 August 1988) is a Slovenian former ski jumper. He is currently head coach of Slovenian men’s "A" ski jumping team.

== Career ==
Hrgota made his international debut in a Fis Race in Villach 2004. In 2006 he finished in the eighth place in Junior World Championships in Kranj. In 2007 in Westby, Hrgota competed in the Ski jumping Continental Cup, where he finished in the third place. 2007 in Tarvisio he won the Junior World Championships team competition together with the others in the Slovenian team. In the summer 2008 Hrgota finished in the second place in Ski jumping Continental Cup. The competition was in Velenje, Hrgota's hometown.
