= Kalle Keituri =

Finnish ski jumper (born 1984)

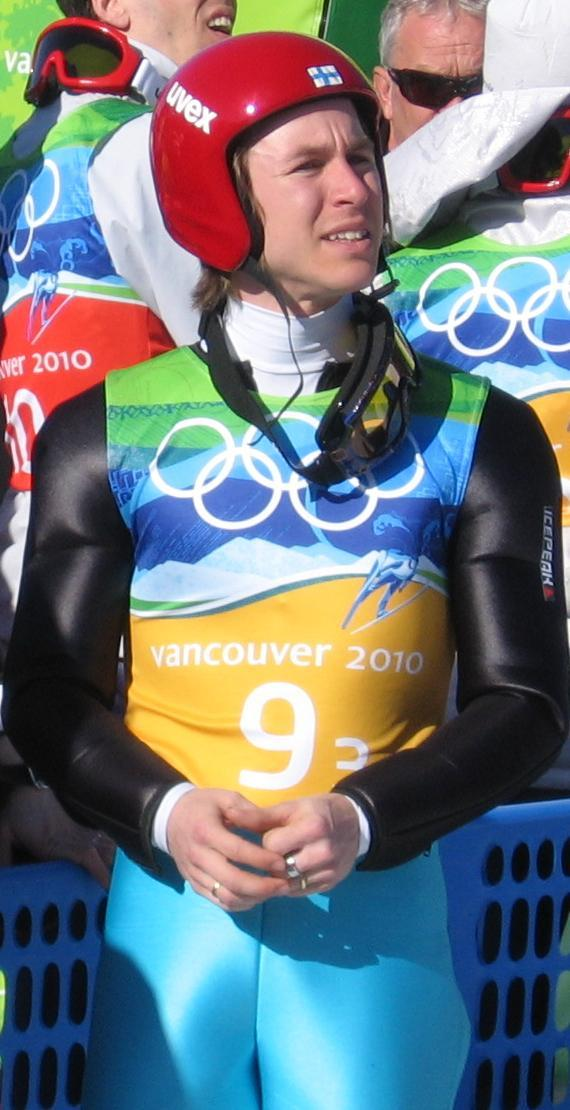
- Keituri in Vancouver, 2010

Personal information
- Nationality: Finland
- Born: 25 April 1984 (age 42) Lahti, Finland

Sport
- Sport: Skiing

World Cup career
- Seasons: 2002–2003; 2005–2012
- Team podiums: 7
- Team wins: 2

Achievements and titles
- Personal bests: 202.5 m (664 ft); Planica, 19 Mar 2005
- Updated on 15 May 2015

Kalle Keituri (born 25 April 1984) is a Finnish former ski jumper who competed from 2002 to 2014.

He debuted in the Continental Cup in 2002 after winning a bronze medal at the 2002 Junior World Championship in Schonach. On 1 March 2002 he made his World Cup debut in Lahti, finishing 19th and gaining 12 points; his overall position at the end of the season was 66th. In the following season he finished 26th in Lahti. In 2004 he did not participate in the World Cup.

The next year was Keituri's best as he reached 9th position in the overall Continental Cup standings, with 540 points; he also competed in five World Cup events. In Lahti he was 22nd, followed by 29th Lillehammer and 22nd in Planica; this gained him 22 points in the overall World Cup.

During the 2005–06 World Cup season his best performance was ninth in Titisee-Neustadt on 22 January 2006, but his final Continental Cup position was only 67th. In the 2007–08 World Cup season he achieved ninth in Kuusamo, which remains his personal best finish. The largest jump in his career was 205.5 metres in Planica.

At the 2010 Winter Olympics in Vancouver, Keituri finished fourth in the team large hill event and 22nd on the individual normal hill.
