= 2006–07 Four Hills Tournament =

Ski jumping competition series

The 2006–07 Four Hills Tournament was a series of ski jumping competitions held in the traditional venues of Oberstdorf, Garmisch-Partenkirchen, Innsbruck and Bischofshofen, located in Germany and Austria. The tournament was part of the 2006–07 Ski Jumping World Cup and points scored in each of the four competitions also counted towards the World Cup rankings. Before the tournament started on 28 December 2006 the World Cup leader was Simon Ammann.

Norwegian Anders Jacobsen won the tournament, after finishing on the podium in both hills in Austria and never finishing worse than fifth on any of the four hills. He thus became the first debutant since Toni Nieminen in 1991–92 to win the tournament. Gregor Schlierenzauer, who turned 17 on the day of the final event in Bischofshofen, won the first and last event, but finished over 15 points behind after 11th place in Innsbruck.

== Tournament review ==
Results are listed for the top 15 skiers, as well as skiers among the top six in the overall World Cup before the tournament, former overall World Cup winners, former Four Hills Tournament winners, former world record holders, and former World or Olympic champions.

=== Oberstdorf, 30 December 2006 ===
Austrian junior world champion and newcomer Gregor Schlierenzauer, who with his 16 years of age was one of the key factors and surprises of the pre season also excelled in the first day of the Four Hills Tournament. His first jump of the day (135.5 metres) was the furthest jump in competition, with only World Cup leader Simon Ammann and Martin Koch able to finish 0.5 metres short. While Andreas Küttel set a new record for the day in the second jump when he reached a distance of 136.5 metres Schlierenzauer again showed his skills and his capability of keeping his nerves in control when he jumped 142.0 metres, just 1.5 metres short to equalise the hill record set by Sigurd Pettersen in 2003. Switzerland's Andreas Küttel claimed the second position, but trailed by 9.5 points, while Adam Małysz of Poland finished in third position, 6.2 points behind Küttel. The win was Schlierenzauer's third win in five World Cup meetings. 2005–06 shared winners Janne Ahonen and Jakub Janda only finished in seventh and 21st position respectively, while Olympic champion Thomas Morgenstern just reached a top 10 ranking. With his win Schlierenzauer not only took the lead in the Four Hills Tournament, but he also overtook Ammann to lead the overall World Cup.

Pos.	Oberstdorf	Jump 1	Jump 2	Points	Pos.	Total	Points
1.	(Austria) Gregor Schlierenzauer	135.5	142.0	296.0	1.	(Austria) Gregor Schlierenzauer	296.0
2.	(Switzerland) Andreas Küttel	133.5	136.5	286.5	2.	(Switzerland) Andreas Küttel	286.5
3.	(Poland) Adam Małysz	132.0	134.0	280.3	3.	(Poland) Adam Małysz	280.3
4.	(Norway) Anders Jacobsen	131.5	135.0	279.7	4.	(Norway) Anders Jacobsen	279.7
5.	(Switzerland) Simon Ammann	135.0	133.0	276.9	5.	(Switzerland) Simon Ammann	276.9
6.	(Finland) Arttu Lappi	131.0	135.0	276.3	6.	(Finland) Arttu Lappi	276.3
7.	(Finland) Janne Ahonen	132.5	131.0	274.8	7.	(Finland) Janne Ahonen	274.8
8.	(Austria) Martin Koch	135.0	129.5	270.6	8.	(Austria) Martin Koch	286.5
9.	(Norway) Anders Bardal	130.0	129.5	267.1	9.	(Norway) Anders Bardal	267.1
10.	(Austria) Thomas Morgenstern	130.5	128.5	265.2	10.	(Austria) Thomas Morgenstern	265.2
11.	(Austria) Andreas Kofler	128.5	125.0	255.3	11.	(Austria) Andreas Kofler	255.3
12.	(Germany) Jörg Ritzerfeld	129.5	124.5	254.7	12.	(Germany) Jörg Ritzerfeld	254.7
13.	(Austria) Martin Höllwarth	127.5	125.5	254.4	13.	(Austria) Martin Höllwarth	254.4
14.	(Austria) Wolfgang Loitzl	126.5	124.5	251.8	14.	(Austria) Wolfgang Loitzl	251.8
15.	(Germany) Michael Uhrmann	128.5	122.5	249.3	15.	(Germany) Michael Uhrmann	249.3
16.	(Norway) Roar Ljøkelsøy	128.0	121.0	246.2	16.	(Norway) Roar Ljøkelsøy	246.2
17.	(Finland) Harri Olli	126.5	122.0	243.3	17.	(Finland) Harri Olli	243.3
18.	(Germany) Martin Schmitt	126.0	122.0	241.4	18.	(Germany) Martin Schmitt	241.4
19.	(Finland) Matti Hautamäki	126.5	120.0	239.7	19.	(Finland) Matti Hautamäki	239.7
20.	(Russia) Denis Kornilov	125.0	120.0	236.5	20.	(Russia) Denis Kornilov	236.5
21.	(Czech Republic) Jakub Janda	121.5	123.5	235.0	21.	(Czech Republic) Jakub Janda	235.0
23.	(Russia) Dmitry Vassiliev	123.0	120.5	232.8	23.	(Russia) Dmitry Vassiliev	232.8
24.	(Austria) Andreas Widhölzl	123.5	119.5	232.4	24.	(Austria) Andreas Widhölzl	232.4
25.	(Finland) Veli-Matti Lindström	125.0	118.0	231.9	25.	(Finland) Veli-Matti Lindström	231.9
28.	(Norway) Bjørn Einar Romøren	122.0	118.0	227.0	28.	(Norway) Bjørn Einar Romøren	227.0
29.	(Poland) Kamil Stoch	123.5	116.5	226.0	29.	(Poland) Kamil Stoch	226.0
30.	(Czech Republic) Roman Koudelka	120.0	116.0	215.8	30.	(Czech Republic) Roman Koudelka	215.8
31.	(Slovenia) Rok Benkovič	121.5	DNQ	115.2	31.	(Slovenia) Rok Benkovič	115.2
45.	(Japan) Takanobu Okabe	112.0	DNQ	96.6	49.	(Japan) Takanobu Okabe	96.6

=== Garmisch-Partenkirchen, 1 January 2007 ===
In windy and rainy conditions, the New Year's Day ski jumping (Neujahrsskispringen) was cancelled after one jump. Noriaki Kasai, who failed to qualify for the event in Oberstdorf, finished third here after having the longest jump, but without a Telemark landing he was docked style points and finished third. Andreas Küttel won the event, and is now three points behind Schlierenzauer in the overall standings. Following Małysz' 12th place and Ammann's 16th place, Jacobsen advanced to third in the overall standings and second in the World Cup standings despite not having finished on the podium thus far in the Four Hills.

Pos.	Garmisch-Partenkirchen	Jump 1	Points	Pos.	Total	Points
1.	(Switzerland) Andreas Küttel	125.5	135.9	1.	(Austria) Gregor Schlierenzauer	425.4
2.	(Finland) Matti Hautamäki	125.0	133.0	2.	(Switzerland) Andreas Küttel	422.4
3.	(Japan) Noriaki Kasai	128.0	132.9	3.	(Norway) Anders Jacobsen	407.8
4.	(Austria) Gregor Schlierenzauer	123.0	129.4	4.	(Finland) Arttu Lappi	404.4
5.	(Norway) Anders Jacobsen	122.0	128.1	5.	(Poland) Adam Małysz	404.2
5.	(Finland) Arttu Lappi	122.0	128.1	6.	(Switzerland) Simon Ammann	394.9
5.	(Norway) Bjørn Einar Romøren	122.0	128.1	7.	(Finland) Janne Ahonen	393.2
8.	(Germany) Martin Schmitt	122.0	127.6	8.	(Austria) Thomas Morgenstern	389.9
9.	(Austria) Andreas Kofler	120.5	124.9	9.	(Norway) Anders Bardal	383.8
9.	(Germany) Michael Uhrmann	120.5	124.9	10.	(Austria) Andreas Kofler	380.2
11.	(Austria) Thomas Morgenstern	124.0	124.7	11.	(Austria) Martin Koch	377.2
12.	(Poland) Adam Małysz	120.5	123.9	12.	(Germany) Michael Uhrmann	374.2
13.	(Czech Republic) Jakub Janda	120.0	123.5	13.	(Finland) Matti Hautamäki	372.7
14.	(Russia) Dmitry Vassiliev	121.5	122.2	14.	(Germany) Martin Schmitt	369.0
15.	(Czech Republic) Roman Koudelka	118.5	119.8	15.	(Germany) Jörg Ritzerfeld	367.6
16.	(Switzerland) Simon Ammann	117.5	118.5	17.	(Czech Republic) Jakub Janda	358.5
17.	(Finland) Janne Ahonen	118.0	118.4	18.	(Norway) Roar Ljøkelsøy	356.0
20.	(Norway) Anders Bardal	116.5	116.7	19.	(Norway) Bjørn Einar Romøren	355.1
23.	(Germany) Jörg Ritzerfeld	115.5	112.9	20.	(Russia) Dmitry Vassiliev	355.0
27.	(Austria) Martin Koch	112.0	106.6	24.	(Austria) Andreas Widhölzl	346.2
31.	(Austria) Andreas Widhölzl	116.0	113.8	29.	(Czech Republic) Roman Koudelka	335.6
33.	(Norway) Roar Ljøkelsøy	113.5	109.8	34.	(Slovenia) Rok Benkovič	215.8
41.	(Slovenia) Rok Benkovič	109.5	100.2	43.	(Japan) Takanobu Okabe	172.9
49.	(Japan) Takanobu Okabe	98.5	76.3	44.	(Japan) Noriaki Kasai	132.9

=== Innsbruck, 4 January 2007 ===
With neither Küttel nor Schlierenzauer able to make it past 123 metres in either leap, they lost plenty of points to winner Jacobsen, who won his second World Cup event of his career. He gained 38 points on Schlierenzauer, and went from third place to a ten-point lead, ahead of Finland's Lappi who finished fourth in the race. Schlierenzauer fell six places in the overall Four Hills standings, but remained within 20 points, or 11 metres, of Jacobsen.

Norway called up Olympic champion and last year's Innsbruck winner, Lars Bystøl, to represent them in the Innsbruck event. However, Bystøl failed to qualify.

Pos.	Innsbruck	Jump 1	Jump 2	Points	Pos.	Total	Points
1.	(Norway) Anders Jacobsen	129.0	128.5	265.0	1.	(Norway) Anders Jacobsen	672.8
2.	(Austria) Thomas Morgenstern	128.5	129.5	263.9	2.	(Finland) Arttu Lappi	662.1
3.	(Switzerland) Simon Ammann	125.5	132.0	261.5	3.	(Switzerland) Simon Ammann	656.4
4.	(Finland) Arttu Lappi	125.5	128.5	257.7	3.	(Switzerland) Andreas Küttel	656.4
5.	(Finland) Janne Ahonen	125.5	126.0	257.2	5.	(Poland) Adam Małysz	654.1
6.	(Poland) Adam Małysz	124.0	126.5	249.9	6.	(Austria) Thomas Morgenstern	653.8
7.	(Switzerland) Andreas Küttel	122.0	120.5	234.0	7.	(Austria) Gregor Schlierenzauer	652.7
8.	(Austria) Martin Höllwarth	123.0	118.5	231.2	8.	(Finland) Janne Ahonen	644.4
9.	(Austria) Manuel Fettner	123.5	118.0	230.7	9.	(Germany) Michael Uhrmann	603.9
10.	(Germany) Michael Uhrmann	115.5	126.0	229.7	10.	(Austria) Andreas Kofler	600.2
11.	(Austria) Gregor Schlierenzauer	122.0	119.0	227.3	11.	(Austria) Martin Höllwarth	596.3
12.	(Russia) Dmitry Vassiliev	122.0	117.0	224.7	12.	(Norway) Anders Bardal	592.5
13.	(Austria) Andreas Kofler	121.0	114.0	220.0	13.	(Austria) Martin Koch	590.5
14.	(Austria) Wolfgang Loitzl	115.0	120.0	219.0	14.	(Germany) Martin Schmitt	584.1
15.	(Poland) Kamil Stoch	120.0	115.5	217.9	15.	(Russia) Dmitry Vassiliev	579.7
17.	(Germany) Martin Schmitt	121.0	113.5	215.1	16.	(Germany) Jörg Ritzerfeld	575.5
18.	(Austria) Martin Koch	119.0	114.5	213.3	17.	(Austria) Wolfgang Loitzl	572.8
19.	(Czech Republic) Jakub Janda	119.5	113.5	212.9	18.	(Czech Republic) Jakub Janda	571.4
20.	(Russia) Denis Kornilov	118.5	113.5	212.1	19.	(Finland) Harri Olli	566.3
21.	(Finland) Harri Olli	116.5	116.0	211.5	20.	(Finland) Matti Hautamäki	565.0
23.	(Austria) Andreas Widhölzl	120.0	111.0	209.3	21.	(Norway) Roar Ljøkelsøy	563.5
24.	(Finland) Veli-Matti Lindström	118.5	113.0	209.2	22.	(Russia) Denis Kornilov	561.2
25.	(Norway) Anders Bardal	118.5	113.0	208.7	23.	(Poland) Kamil Stoch	559.6
26.	(Germany) Jörg Ritzerfeld	115.5	115.0	207.9	24.	(Austria) Andreas Widhölzl	555.5
27.	(Norway) Roar Ljøkelsøy	119.0	111.0	207.5	25.	(Finland) Veli-Matti Lindström	449.5
28.	(Japan) Noriaki Kasai	117.0	109.5	202.2	26.	(Norway) Bjørn Einar Romøren	458.6
29.	(Finland) Matti Hautamäki	116.5	109.5	192.3	31.	(Japan) Noriaki Kasai	335.1
33.	(Norway) Bjørn Einar Romøren	115.0	DNQ	103.5	41.	(Austria) Manuel Fettner	230.7
DNS	(Slovenia) Rok Benkovič				43.	(Slovenia) Rok Benkovič	215.8
DNS	(Japan) Takanobu Okabe				50.	(Japan) Takanobu Okabe	172.9

=== Bischofshofen, 7 January 2007 ===
Gregor Schlierenzauer took his fourth World Cup win on his seventeenth birthday, but it wasn't enough to beat Jacobsen in the overall standings; despite having won two events to Jacobsen's one, Schlierenzauer had to be content with second place overall in the Four Hills tournament.

Pos.	Innsbruck	Jump 1	Jump 2	Points	Pos.	Total	Points
1.	(Austria) Gregor Schlierenzauer	139.5	141.0	291.9	1.	(Norway) Anders Jacobsen	961.9
2.	(Norway) Anders Jacobsen	137.5	142.0	289.1	2.	(Austria) Gregor Schlierenzauer	944.7
3.	(Switzerland) Simon Ammann	135.0	137.5	275.5	3.	(Switzerland) Simon Ammann	931.9
4.	(Russia) Dmitry Vassiliev	133.5	136.0	269.1	4.	(Austria) Thomas Morgenstern	916.2
5.	(Austria) Thomas Morgenstern	133.0	132.5	262.4	5.	(Switzerland) Andreas Küttel	910.4
6.	(Austria) Arthur Pauli	132.0	131.0	254.9	6.	(Finland) Arttu Lappi	908.3
7.	(Switzerland) Andreas Küttel	130.5	132.0	254.0	7.	(Poland) Adam Małysz	906.5
8.	(Poland) Adam Małysz	129.5	133.5	252.4	8.	(Finland) Janne Ahonen	890.7
9.	(Poland) Kamil Stoch	126.5	124.5	251.3	9.	(Germany) Michael Uhrmann	852.0
10.	(Germany) Michael Uhrmann	127.0	132.5	248.1	10.	(Russia) Dmitry Vassiliev	848.8
11.	(Finland) Janne Ahonen	128.0	132.5	246.3	11.	(Austria) Martin Koch	832.5
12.	(Finland) Arttu Lappi	131.0	128.0	246.2	12.	(Austria) Andreas Kofler	828.6
13.	(Norway) Tom Hilde	127.5	129.5	243.1	13.	(Austria) Martin Höllwarth	824.7
14.	(Austria) Martin Koch	126.0	131.5	240.8	14.	(Germany) Martin Schmitt	819.9
15.	(Austria) Mario Innauer	128.5	127.5	240.8	15.	(Poland) Kamil Stoch	810.9
16.	(Norway) Roar Ljøkelsøy	125.5	128.5	237.2	17.	(Norway) Roar Ljøkelsøy	800.7
18.	(Germany) Martin Schmitt	129.0	126.5	235.8	18.	(Czech Republic) Jakub Janda	791.8
22.	(Austria) Martin Höllwarth	125.5	125.0	228.4	20.	(Finland) Matti Hautamäki	788.9
24.	(Austria) Andreas Widhölzl	124.0	124.0	224.9	22.	(Austria) Andreas Widhölzl	780.4
25.	(Finland) Matti Hautamäki	124.0	124.0	223.9	31.	(Norway) Bjørn Einar Romøren	458.6
27.	(Czech Republic) Jakub Janda	123.5	122.0	220.4	34.	(Japan) Noriaki Kasai	435.8
40.	(Norway) Lars Bystøl	121.0	DNQ	104.3	50.	(Japan) Takanobu Okabe	264.1
42.	(Japan) Noriaki Kasai	119.0	DNQ	100.7	51.	(Slovenia) Rok Benkovič	215.8
49.	(Japan) Takanobu Okabe	114.0	DNQ	91.2	58.	(Norway) Lars Bystøl	104.3

== See also ==
- 2007 in ski jumping
- 2006–07 Ski Jumping World Cup
