= 2007 in ski jumping =

== News ==
=== January ===
- 1 - Andreas Küttel wins the second competition for the 2006-07 Four Hills Tournament after he led the pack when all jumpers finished their first jump and the competition was cancelled due to poor weather conditions with wind and rain.

== Ski jumping World Cup ==
Date	Place	Winner	Overall Leader
24 November 2006	Kuusamo, Finland	(Finland) Arttu Lappi	(Finland) Arttu Lappi
2 December 2006	Lillehammer, Norway	(Switzerland) Simon Ammann	(Switzerland) Simon Ammann
3 December 2006	Lillehammer, Norway	(Austria) Gregor Schlierenzauer	(Switzerland) Simon Ammann
16 December 2006	Engelberg, Switzerland	(Austria) Gregor Schlierenzauer	(Switzerland) Simon Ammann
17 December 2006	Engelberg, Switzerland	(Norway) Anders Jacobsen	(Switzerland) Simon Ammann
30 December 2006	Oberstdorf, Germany	(Austria) Gregor Schlierenzauer	(Austria) Gregor Schlierenzauer
1 January 2007	Garmisch-Partenkirchen, Germany	(Switzerland) Andreas Küttel	(Austria) Gregor Schlierenzauer
4 January 2007	Innsbruck, Austria	(Norway) Anders Jacobsen	(Norway) Anders Jacobsen
7 January 2007	Bischofshofen, Austria	(Austria) Gregor Schlierenzauer	(Norway) Anders Jacobsen
13 January 2007	Vikersund, Norway	(Norway) Anders Jacobsen	(Norway) Anders Jacobsen
20 January 2007	Zakopane, Poland	(Slovenia) Rok Urbanc	(Norway) Anders Jacobsen
27 January 2007	Oberstdorf, Germany	(Poland) Adam Małysz	(Norway) Anders Jacobsen
28 January 2007	Oberstdorf, Germany	(Germany) Michael Uhrmann	(Norway) Anders Jacobsen

== Four Hills Tournament ==
Date	Place	Top 3	Leader
30 December 2006	Oberstdorf, Germany	(Austria) Gregor Schlierenzauer (Switzerland) Andreas Küttel (Poland) Adam Małysz	(Austria) Gregor Schlierenzauer
1 January 2007	Garmisch-Partenkirchen, Germany	(Switzerland) Andreas Küttel (Finland) Matti Hautamäki (Japan) Noriaki Kasai	(Austria) Gregor Schlierenzauer
4 January 2007	Innsbruck, Austria	(Norway) Anders Jacobsen (Austria) Thomas Morgenstern (Switzerland) Simon Ammann	(Norway) Anders Jacobsen
7 January 2007	Bischofshofen, Austria	(Austria) Gregor Schlierenzauer (Norway) Anders Jacobsen (Switzerland) Simon Ammann	(Norway) Anders Jacobsen (Austria) Gregor Schlierenzauer (Switzerland) Simon Ammann

== FIS Nordic World Ski Championships ==
, Location: Sapporo, Japan

Date	Disc.	Gold	Silver	Bronze
24 February 2007	Large Hill Individual	(Switzerland) Simon Ammann	(Finland) Harri Olli	(Norway) Roar Ljøkelsøy
25 February 2007	Large Hill Team	Austria	Norway	Japan
3 March 2007	Normall Hill Individual	(Poland) Adam Małysz	(Switzerland) Simon Ammann	(Austria) Thomas Morgenstern
