= 2006 FIS Ski Jumping Grand Prix =

International ski jumping competition

Grand Prix 2006
Winners
- Overall: (Poland) Adam Małysz
- Four Nations GP: (Austria) Andreas Kofler
- Nations Cup: Austria

Competitions
- Venues: 9
- Individual: 10
- Team: 1

The 2006 FIS Ski Jumping Grand Prix was the 13th Summer Grand Prix season in ski jumping on plastic. Season began on 5 August 2006 in Hinterzarten, Germany and ended on 3 October 2006 in Oberhof.

Other competitive circuits this season included the World Cup and Continental Cup.

== Calendar ==
=== Men ===
Num	Season	Date	Place	Hill	Size	Winner	Second	Third	Yellow bib	Ref.
69	1	6 August 2006	(Germany) Hinterzarten	Rothaus-Schanze HS108	NH	(Germany) Georg Späth	(Austria) Andreas Kofler	(Austria) Gregor Schlierenzauer	(Germany) Georg Späth	
70	2	8 August 2006	(Italy) Predazzo	Trampolino dal Ben HS134 (night)	LH	(Poland) Adam Małysz	(Switzerland) Andreas Küttel	(Czech Republic) Jakub Janda	(Poland) Adam Małysz	
71	3	12 August 2006	(Switzerland) Einsiedeln	Andreas Küttel Schanze HS117	LH	(Austria) Andreas Kofler	(Austria) Gregor Schlierenzauer	(Switzerland) Simon Ammann	(Austria) Andreas Kofler	
72	4	14 August 2006	(France) Courchevel	Tremplin du Praz HS132	LH	(Austria) Gregor Schlierenzauer	(Austria) Wolfgang Loitzl	(Poland) Adam Małysz	(Austria) Andreas Kofler	
1st Four-Nations-Grand-Prix Overall (6–14 August 2006)						(Austria) Andreas Kofler	(Poland) Adam Małysz	(Austria) Gregor Schlierenzauer		
73	5	26 August 2006	(Poland) Zakopane	Wielka Krokiew HS134 (night)	LH	(Poland) Adam Małysz	(Austria) Gregor Schlierenzauer	(Slovenia) Jernej Damjan (Norway) Anders Bardal	(Poland) Adam Małysz	
74	6	2 September 2006	(Slovenia) Kranj	Bauhenk HS109	NH	(Switzerland) Simon Ammann	(Austria) Wolfgang Loitzl	(Czech Republic) Roman Koudelka	(Poland) Adam Małysz	
75	7	9 September 2006	(Japan) Hakuba	Olympic Ski Jumps HS131 (night)	LH	(Finland) Janne Happonen	(Austria) Wolfgang Loitzl	(Czech Republic) Antonín Hájek	(Austria) Wolfgang Loitzl	
76	8	10 September 2006	(Japan) Hakuba	Olympic Ski Jumps HS131	LH	(Finland) Janne Happonen	(Switzerland) Andreas Küttel	(Czech Republic) Antonín Hájek	(Austria) Wolfgang Loitzl	
77	9	30 September 2006	(Germany) Klingenthal	Vogtland Arena HS140	LH	(Poland) Adam Małysz	(Austria) Andreas Widhölzl	(Finland) Tami Kiuru	(Poland) Adam Małysz	
78	10	3 October 2006	(Germany) Oberhof	Hans-Renner-Schanze HS140	LH	(Poland) Adam Małysz	(Norway) Anders Bardal	(Finland) Janne Ahonen	(Poland) Adam Małysz	

=== Men's team ===
Num	Season	Date	Place	Hill	Size	Winner	Second	Third	Yellow bib	Ref.
9	1	5 August 2006	(Germany) Hinterzarten	Rothaus-Schanze HS108	NH	Austria Wolfgang Loitzl; Gregor Schlierenzauer; Manuel Fettner; Andreas Kofler	Finland Tami Kiuru; Harri Olli; Janne Happonen; Matti Hautamäki	Germany Michael Neumayer; Martin Schmitt; Georg Späth; Michael Uhrmann	Austria	

== Standings ==
=== Individual ===
Rank	after 10 events	Points
1	(Poland) Adam Malysz	545
2	(Austria) Wolfgang Loitzl	486
3	(Austria) Andreas Kofler	397
4	(Switzerland) Simon Ammann	393
5	(Austria) Gregor Schlierenzauer	330

=== Nations Cup ===
Rank	after 11 events	Points
1	Austria	2261
2	Norway	980
3	Finland	971
4	Poland	902
5	Germany	845

=== Four Nations Grand Prix ===
Rank	after 4 events	Points
1	(Austria) Andreas Kofler	1002.0
2	(Poland) Adam Malysz	994.3
3	(Austria) Gregor Schlierenzauer	990.9
4	(Austria) Wolfgang Loitzl	971.9
5	(Switzerland) Simon Ammann	967.9
