= 2005 FIS Ski Jumping Grand Prix =

International ski jumping competition

Grand Prix 2005
Winners
- Overall: (Czech Republic) Jakub Janda
- Nations Cup: Austria

Competitions
- Venues: 7
- Individual: 8
- Team: 1

The 2005 FIS Ski Jumping Grand Prix was the 12th Summer Grand Prix season in ski jumping on plastic. Season began on 6 August 2005 in Hinterzarten, Germany and ended on 11 September 2005 in Hakuba.

Other competitive circuits this season included the World Cup and Continental Cup.

== Calendar ==
=== Men ===
| Num | Season | Date | Place | Hill | Size | Winner | Second | Third | Yellow bib | Ref. |
|---|---|---|---|---|---|---|---|---|---|---|
| 61 | 1 | 7 August 2005 | (Germany) Hinterzarten | Rothaus-Schanze HS108 | NH | (Austria) Wolfgang Loitzl | (Finland) Janne Ahonen | (Austria) Thomas Morgenstern | (Austria) Wolfgang Loitzl | |
| 62 | 2 | 13 August 2005 | (Switzerland) Einsiedeln | Andreas Küttel Schanze HS117 | LH | (Slovenia) Robert Kranjec | (Finland) Janne Happonen | (Czech Republic) Jakub Janda | (Austria) Wolfgang Loitzl | |
| 63 | 3 | 14 August 2005 | (France) Courchevel | Tremplin du Praz HS132 | LH | (Austria) Thomas Morgenstern | (Germany) Michael Neumayer | (Austria) Wolfgang Loitzl | (Austria) Thomas Morgenstern | |
| 64 | 4 | 27 August 2005 | (Poland) Zakopane | Wielka Krokiew HS134 (night) | LH | (Czech Republic) Jakub Janda | (Austria) Thomas Morgenstern | (Austria) Wolfgang Loitzl | (Austria) Thomas Morgenstern | |
| 65 | 5 | 31 August 2005 | (Italy) Predazzo | Trampolino dal Ben HS134 (night) | LH | (Czech Republic) Jakub Janda | (Switzerland) Andreas Küttel | (Austria) Wolfgang Loitzl | (Czech Republic) Jakub Janda | |
| 66 | 6 | 3 September 2005 | (Austria) Bischofshofen | Paul-Ausserleitner-Schanze HS140 | LH | (Switzerland) Andreas Küttel | (Czech Republic) Jakub Janda | (Germany) Michael Uhrmann | (Czech Republic) Jakub Janda | |
| 67 | 7 | 10 September 2005 | (Japan) Hakuba | Olympic Ski Jumps HS131 (night) | LH | (Czech Republic) Jakub Janda | (Finland) Janne Happonen | (Austria) Thomas Morgenstern | (Czech Republic) Jakub Janda | |
| 68 | 8 | 11 September 2005 | (Japan) Hakuba | Olympic Ski Jumps HS131 | LH | (Czech Republic) Jakub Janda | (Austria) Wolfgang Loitzl (Austria) Thomas Morgenstern | | (Czech Republic) Jakub Janda | |

=== Men's team ===
| Num | Season | Date | Place | Hill | Size | Winner | Second | Third | Yellow bib | Ref. |
|---|---|---|---|---|---|---|---|---|---|---|
| 8 | 1 | 6 August 2005 | (Germany) Hinterzarten | Rothaus-Schanze HS108 | NH | Germany Michael Neumayer; Georg Späth; Alexander Herr; Michael Uhrmann | Finland Juha-Matti Ruuskanen; Tami Kiuru; Matti Hautamäki; Janne Ahonen | Austria Wolfgang Loitzl; Andreas Widhölzl; Martin Höllwarth; Thomas Morgenstern | Germany | |

== Standings ==
=== Overall ===
| Rank | after 8 events | Points |
|---|---|---|
| 1 | (Czech Republic) Jakub Janda | 606 |
| 2 | (Austria) Wolfgang Loitzl | 470 |
| 3 | (Austria) Thomas Morgenstern | 466 |
| 4 | (Switzerland) Andreas Küttel | 297 |
| 5 | (Finland) Janne Happonen | 270 |

=== Nations Cup ===
| Rank | after 9 events | Points |
|---|---|---|
| 1 | Austria | 1623 |
| 2 | Czech Republic | 1029 |
| 3 | Germany | 1020 |
| 4 | Finland | 894 |
| 5 | Slovenia | 664 |
