= 2006–07 FIS Ski Jumping World Cup =

Ski jumping championship season

2006–07 World Cup
Winners
- Overall: (Poland) Adam Małysz
- Four Hills Tournament: (Norway) Anders Jacobsen
- Nordic Tournament: (Poland) Adam Małysz
- Nations Cup: Austria

Competitions
- Venues: 16
- Individual: 24
- Team: 2
- Cancelled: 3
- Rescheduled: 7

The 2006–07 FIS Ski Jumping World Cup was the 28th World Cup season in ski jumping and the unofficial World Cup season in ski flying with no small crystal globe awarded.

Season began in Kuusamo, Finland on 24 November 2006 and finished in Planica, Slovenia on 25 March 2007. The individual World Cup overall winner was Adam Małysz (first for Poland) and he also won Nordic Tournament. Nations Cup was taken by Team of Austria.

24 men's individual events on 16 different venues in 8 countries were held only in Europe this season (however World Championships was held in Asia). There were many problems because of weather conditions this season and schedule changed a lot. 7 individual events were rescheduled and 3 cancelled as Kuusamo, Trondheim, Harrachov, Vikersund, Zakopane, Oberstdorf and the Lillehammer didn't have much luck. There were also two men's team events held this season.

e.on Ruhrgas was this and next season's main sponsor, and therefore, this season's leader's overall jersey was red, in reference to the company, rather than the traditional yellow.

Peaks of the season were FIS Nordic World Ski Championships, 4H and Nordic Tournament.

== Map of world cup hosts ==
Europe
Germany	Austria

== Calendar ==
=== Men's Individual ===
L – large hill / F – flying hill
All	No.	Date	Place (Hill)	Size	Winner	Second	Third	Overall leader (Note: Red bib in colors of main sponsor e.on Ruhrgas (instead of yellow) was exceptionally in use for overall leader in 2006/07 and 2007/08 seasons.)	R.
632	1	24 November 2006	(Finland) Kuusamo (Rukatunturi HS142)	L _{430}	(Finland) Arttu Lappi	(Switzerland) Simon Ammann	(Norway) Anders Jacobsen	(Finland) Arttu Lappi	
		25 November 2006	(Finland) Kuusamo (Rukatunturi HS142)	L _{cnx}	cancelled due to strong wind			—	
		2 December 2005	(Norway) Trondheim (Granåsen HS131)	L _{cnx}	cancelled due to lack of snow (both events rescheduled to Lillehammer)			—	
		3 December 2006	(Norway) Trondheim (Granåsen HS131)	L _{cnx}	cancelled due to lack of snow (both events rescheduled to Lillehammer)			—	
633	2	(Note: Cancelled event from Trondheim (2 December) was rescheduled to Lillehammer (on the same day).)2 December 2006	(Norway) Lillehammer (Lysgårdsbakken HS138)	L _{431}	(Switzerland) Simon Ammann	(Switzerland) Andreas Küttel	(Austria) Thomas Morgenstern	(Switzerland) Simon Ammann	
634	3	(Note: Cancelled event from Trondheim (3 December) was rescheduled to Lillehammer (on the same day).)3 December 2006	(Norway) Lillehammer (Lysgårdsbakken HS138)	L _{432}	(Austria) Gregor Schlierenzauer	(Norway) Anders Jacobsen	(Poland) Adam Małysz	(Switzerland) Simon Ammann	
		9 December 2006	(Czech Republic) Harrachov (Čerťák HS142)	L _{cnx}	cancelled due to lack of snow (9th December event rescheduled to Klingenthal on 7 February)			—	
		10 December 2006	(Czech Republic) Harrachov (Čerťák HS142)	L _{cnx}	cancelled due to lack of snow (9th December event rescheduled to Klingenthal on 7 February)			—	
635	4	16 December 2006	(Switzerland) Engelberg (Gross-Titlis HS137)	L _{433}	(Austria) Gregor Schlierenzauer	(Norway) Anders Jacobsen	(Poland) Adam Małysz	(Switzerland) Simon Ammann	
636	5	17 December 2006	(Switzerland) Engelberg (Gross-Titlis HS137)	L _{434}	(Norway) Anders Jacobsen	(Switzerland) Simon Ammann	(Austria) Gregor Schlierenzauer	(Switzerland) Simon Ammann	
637	6	30 December 2006	(Germany) Oberstdorf (Schattenberg HS137)	L _{435}	(Austria) Gregor Schlierenzauer	(Switzerland) Andreas Küttel	(Poland) Adam Małysz	(Austria) G. Schlierenzauer	
638	7	1 January 2007	(Germany) Garmisch-Pa (Gr. Olympiaschanze HS125)	L _{436}	(Switzerland) Andreas Küttel	(Finland) Matti Hautamäki	(Japan) Noriaki Kasai	(Austria) G. Schlierenzauer	
639	8	4 January 2007	(Austria) Innsbruck (Bergiselschanze HS130)	L _{437}	(Norway) Anders Jacobsen	(Austria) Thomas Morgenstern	(Switzerland) Simon Ammann	(Norway) Anders Jacobsen	
640	9	7 January 2007	(Austria) Bischofshofen (Paul-Ausserleitner HS140)	L _{438}	(Austria) Gregor Schlierenzauer	(Norway) Anders Jacobsen	(Switzerland) Simon Ammann	(Norway) Anders Jacobsen	
55th Four Hills Tournament Overall (30 December 2006 – 7 January 2007)					(Norway) Anders Jacobsen	(Austria) Gregor Schlierenzauer	(Switzerland) Simon Ammann	4H Tournament	
641	10	13 January 2007	(Norway) Vikersund (Vikersundbakken HS207)	F _{063}	(Norway) Anders Jacobsen	(Austria) Thomas Morgenstern	(Finland) Matti Hautamäki	(Norway) Anders Jacobsen	
		14 January 2007	(Norway) Vikersund (Vikersundbakken HS207)	F _{cnx}	cancelled and rescheduled to Planica on 23 March			—	
642	11	20 January 2007	(Poland) Zakopane (Wielka Krokiew HS134)	L _{439}	(Slovenia) Rok Urbanc	(Norway) Roar Ljøkelsøy	(Finland) Matti Hautamäki	(Norway) Anders Jacobsen	
		21 January 2007	(Poland) Zakopane (Wielka Krokiew HS134)	L _{cnx}	cancelled due to strong wind			—	
		27 January 2007	(Germany) Oberstdorf; Heini-Klopfer HS213)	F _{cnx}	cancelled due to lack of snow (rescheduled to Schattenbergschanze)			—	
		28 January 2007	(Germany) Oberstdorf; Heini-Klopfer HS213)	F _{cnx}	cancelled due to lack of snow (rescheduled to Schattenbergschanze)			—	
643	12	(Note: Cancelled ski flying event from Heini-Klopfer (27 January) was rescheduled to Schattenbergschanze large hill (on the same day).)27 January 2007	(Germany) Oberstdorf; Schattenberg HS137)	L _{440}	(Poland) Adam Małysz	(Austria) Thomas Morgenstern	(Germany) Michael Uhrmann	(Norway) Anders Jacobsen	
644	13	(Note: Cancelled ski flying event from Heini-Klopfer (28 January) was rescheduled to Schattenbergschanze large hill (on the same day).)28 January 2007	(Germany) Oberstdorf; Schattenberg HS137)	L _{441}	(Germany) Michael Uhrmann	(Norway) Anders Jacobsen	(Italy) Andrea Morassi	(Norway) Anders Jacobsen	
645	14	3 February 2007	(Germany) Titisee-Neustadt (Hochfirstschanze HS142)	L _{442}	(Poland) Adam Małysz	(Austria) Andreas Kofler	(Norway) Anders Jacobsen	(Norway) Anders Jacobsen	
646	15	4 February 2007	(Germany) Titisee-Neustadt (Hochfirstschanze HS142)	L _{443}	(Poland) Adam Małysz	(Austria) Gregor Schlierenzauer	(Russia) Dmitry Vasiliev	(Norway) Anders Jacobsen	
647	16	(Note: Cancelled event from Harrachov (9 December) was rescheduled to Klingenthal (7 February).)7 February 2007	(Germany) Klingenthal (Vogtland Arena HS140)	L _{444}	(Austria) Gregor Schlierenzauer	(Switzerland) Simon Ammann	(Poland) Adam Małysz	(Norway) Anders Jacobsen	
648	17	10 February 2007	(Germany) Willingen (Mühlenkopfschanze HS145)	L _{445}	(Norway) Anders Jacobsen	(Germany) Michael Uhrmann	(Slovenia) Jernej Damjan	(Norway) Anders Jacobsen	
FIS Nordic World Ski Championships 2007 (24 February – 3 March • (Japan) Sapporo)
649	18	11 March 2007	(Finland) Lahti (Salpausselkä HS130)	L _{446}	(Poland) Adam Małysz	(Austria) Andreas Kofler	(Germany) Martin Schmitt	(Norway) Anders Jacobsen	
650	19	13 March 2007	(Finland) Kuopio (Puijo HS127)	L _{447}	(Poland) Adam Małysz	(Austria) Andreas Kofler	(Austria) Thomas Morgenstern	(Norway) Anders Jacobsen	
		16 March 2007	(Norway) Lillehammer (Lysgårdsbakken HS138)	L _{cnx}	cancelled due to weather (rescheduled to Oslo on 17 March)			—	
651	20	(Note: Cancelled event from Lillehammer (16 March) was rescheduled to Oslo (17 March).)17 March 2007	(Norway) Oslo (Holmenkollbakken HS128)	L _{448}	(Poland) Adam Małysz	(Switzerland) Andreas Küttel	(Norway) Anders Bardal	(Poland) Adam Małysz	
652	21	18 March 2007	(Norway) Oslo (Holmenkollbakken HS128)	L _{449}	(Switzerland) Simon Ammann	(Austria) Martin Koch	(Finland) Matti Hautamäki	(Norway) Anders Jacobsen	
11th Nordic Tournament Overall (11 – 18 March 2007)					(Poland) Adam Małysz	(Austria) Andreas Kofler	(Switzerland) Simon Ammann	Nordic Tournament	
653	22	(Note: Cancelled event from Vikersund (14 January) was rescheduled to Planica (23 March).)23 March 2007	(Slovenia) Planica (Letalnica b. Gorišek HS215)	F _{064}	(Poland) Adam Małysz	(Switzerland) Simon Ammann	(Slovenia) Jernej Damjan	(Poland) Adam Małysz	
654	23	24 March 2007	(Slovenia) Planica (Letalnica b. Gorišek HS215)	F _{065}	(Poland) Adam Małysz	(Norway) Anders Jacobsen	(Austria) Martin Koch	(Poland) Adam Małysz	
655	24	25 March 2007	(Slovenia) Planica (Letalnica b. Gorišek HS215)	F _{066}	(Poland) Adam Małysz	(Switzerland) Simon Ammann	(Austria) Martin Koch	(Poland) Adam Małysz	
28th FIS World Cup Overall (24 November 2006 – 25 March 2007)					(Poland) Adam Małysz	(Norway) Anders Jacobsen	(Switzerland) Simon Ammann	World Cup Overall	

=== Men's Team ===
All	No.	Date	Place (Hill)	Size	Winner	Second	Third
35	1	11 February 2007	(Germany) Willingen (Mühlenkopfschanze HS145)	L _{030}	Austria Wolfgang Loitzl; Andreas Kofler; Arthur Pauli; Gregor Schlierenzauer	Norway Tom Hilde; Anders Bardal; Anders Jacobsen; Roar Ljøkelsøy	Germany Stephan Hocke; Tobias Bogner; Jörg Ritzerfeld; Michael Uhrmann
36	2	10 March 2007	(Finland) Lahti (Salpausselkä HS130)	L _{031}	Austria Martin Höllwarth; Gregor Schlierenzauer; Andreas Kofler; Thomas Morgenstern	Norway Tom Hilde; Anders Bardal; Anders Jacobsen; Roar Ljøkelsøy	Finland Harri Olli; Tami Kiuru; Matti Hautamäki; Janne Ahonen

== Standings ==
=== Overall ===
Rank	after 24 events	Points
1	(Poland) Adam Małysz	1453
2	(Norway) Anders Jacobsen	1319
3	(Switzerland) Simon Ammann	1167
4	(Austria) Gregor Schlierenzauer	956
5	(Switzerland) Andreas Küttel	804
6	(Austria) Thomas Morgenstern	756
7	(Austria) Andreas Kofler	727
8	(Finland) Matti Hautamäki	539
9	(Finland) Janne Ahonen	529
10	(Germany) Michael Uhrmann	524

=== Nations Cup ===
Rank	after 26 events	Points
1	Austria	5088
2	Norway	3710
3	Switzerland	2442
4	Finland	2427
5	Poland	1785
6	Germany	1711
7	Russia	1456
8	Czech Republic	754
9	Slovenia	717
10	Japan	271

=== Prize money ===
Rank	after 26 events	CHF
1	(Poland) Adam Małysz	326,250
2	(Norway) Anders Jacobsen	249,800
3	(Austria) Gregor Schlierenzauer	212,150
4	(Switzerland) Simon Ammann	179,000
5	(Switzerland) Andreas Küttel	96,200
6	(Austria) Thomas Morgenstern	84,500
7	(Austria) Andreas Kofler	80,150
8	(Germany) Michael Uhrmann	69,050
9	(Finland) Matti Hautamäki	54,500
10	(Austria) Martin Koch	48,000

=== Four Hills Tournament ===
Rank	after 4 events	Points
1	(Norway) Anders Jacobsen	961.9
2	(Austria) Gregor Schlierenzauer	944.6
3	(Switzerland) Simon Ammann	931.9
4	(Austria) Thomas Morgenstern	916.2
5	(Switzerland) Andreas Küttel	910.4
6	(Finland) Arttu Lappi	908.3
7	(Poland) Adam Małysz	906.5
8	(Finland) Janne Ahonen	890.7
9	(Germany) Michael Uhrmann	852.0
10	(Russia) Dmitriy Vassiliev	848.8

=== Nordic Tournament ===
Rank	after 4 events	Points
1	(Poland) Adam Małysz	822.4
2	(Austria) Andreas Kofler	820.3
3	(Switzerland) Simon Ammann	797.1
4	(Finland) Janne Ahonen	767.4
5	(Russia) Dimitry Ipatov	767.1
6	(Austria) Wolfgang Loitzl	755.8
7	(Finland) Matti Hautamäki	745.8
8	(Switzerland) Andreas Küttel	723.9
9	(Russia) Dmitriy Vassiliev	723.2
10	(Norway) Tom Hilde	714.2

== See also ==
- 2006 Grand Prix (top level summer series)
- 2006–07 FIS Continental Cup (2nd level competition)
