= Haferl landing =

Landing technique in ski jumping

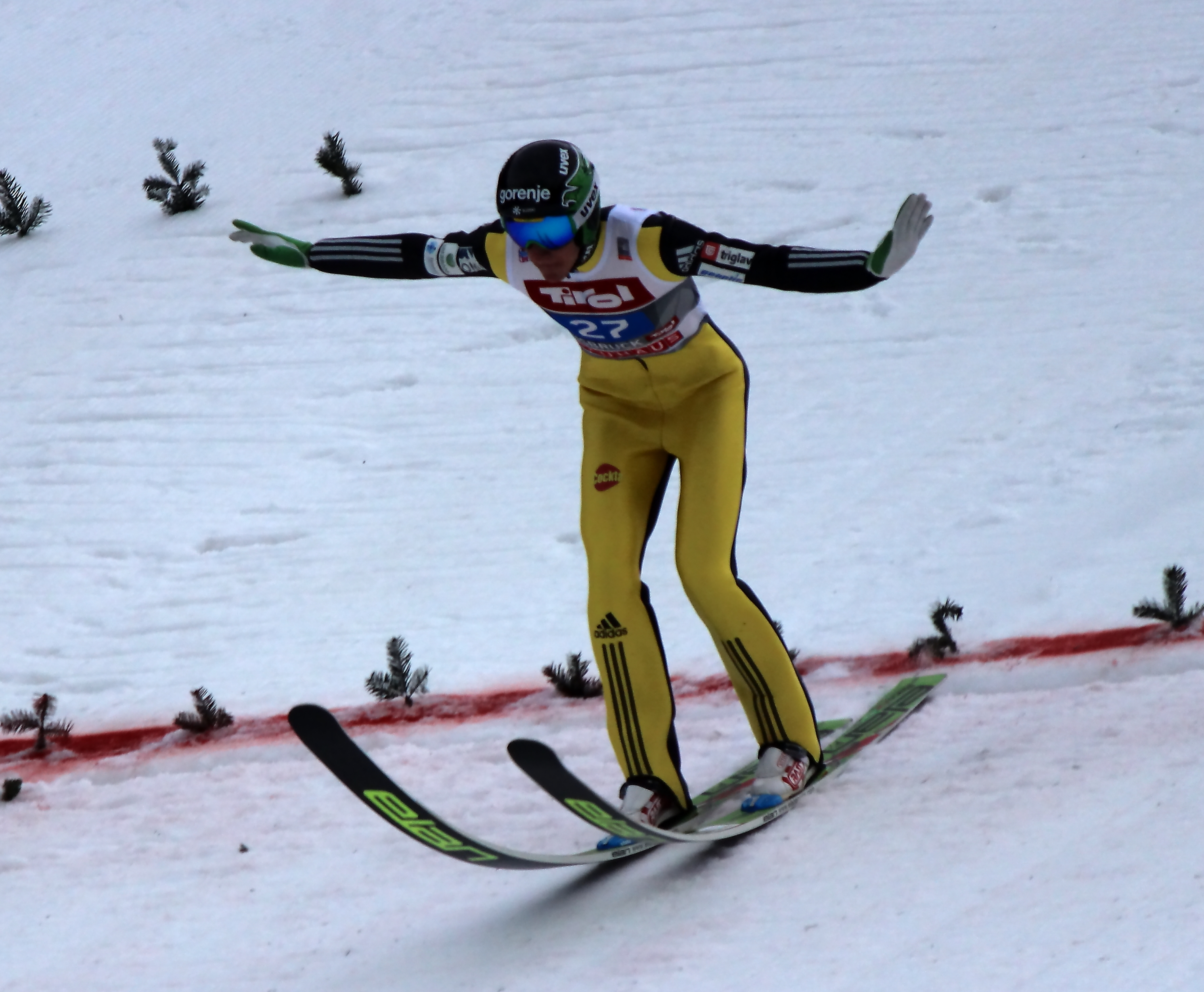
Haferl landing

The Haferl landing also called parallel landing (or kacherl landing in Austrian dialect), is a landing technique in ski jumping. To perform this landing, the athlete slightly parts their legs, bends both knees and aligns the fronts of the skis in the landing process.

== Origin of the name ==
The name alludes to the position the athlete is taking while landing, which looks like he is about to use a chamber pot (in Bavarian dialect called Haferl).

== Rating of the Haferl landing ==
In contrast to the elegant and desired Telemark landing, where the athlete performs a lunge and pushes one ski a little more to the front while the other ski is pushed backwards, for the Haferl landing the athlete is punished with the deduction of points for performance. According to the ski competition rules at least 2.0 points will be deducted, if the Telemark position is missing at the end of the landing.

== Application ==
Athletes perform the Haferl landing due to safety reasons when their jump is very far and comes close to the hill size of the ski jumping hill.

The olympic champion from Switzerland Simon Ammann could keep up with the extended class of the world leaders regarding the distance of his jumps but often lost crucial points for performance due to his Haferl landing .
