= 2005–06 FIS Ski Jumping World Cup =

Ski jumping championship season

2005–06 World Cup
Winners
- Overall: (Czech Republic) Jakub Janda
- Four Hills Tournament: (Czech Republic) Jakub Janda (Finland) Janne Ahonen
- Nordic Tournament: (Austria) Thomas Morgenstern
- Nations Cup: Austria

Competitions
- Venues: 16
- Individual: 22
- Team: 2
- Cancelled: 1
- Rescheduled: 3

The 2005–06 FIS Ski Jumping World Cup was the 27th World Cup season in ski jumping and the unofficial World Cup season in ski flying with no small crystal globe awarded.

Season began in Kuusamo, Finland on 26 November 2005 and finished in Planica, Slovenia on 19 March 2006. The individual overall World Cup was Czech ski jumper Jakub Janda], Thomas Morgenstern won Nordic Tournament and Nations Cup was taken by Team of Austria.

First and only time in history so far we had seen double Four Hills Tournament overall win with Jakub Janda and Janne Ahonen sharing the title (chances for this all almost none).

22 men's individual events on 16 different venues in 11 countries were held on the two different continents (Europe and Asia). With a quiet a few problems at the start of the season; individual opening competition in Kuusamo was rescheduled on the next day (two competitions in one day) and both events from Trondheim (due to lack of snow) were rescheduled to Lillehammer and one event in Engelberg was cancelled. There were also two men's team events held.

Peaks of the season were Winter Olympics (in Pragelato), FIS Ski Flying World Championships, Four Hills Tournament and Nordic Tournament.

== Map of world cup hosts ==
Europe
Germany	Austria	Asia

== Calendar ==
=== Men's Individual ===
L – large hill / F – flying hill
All	No.	Date	Place (Hill)	Size	Winner	Second	Third	Overall leader	R.
		25 November 2005	(Finland) Kuusamo (Rukatunturi HS142)	L _{cnx}	cancelled due to heavy snow and moved to first event next day			—	
610	1	(Note: Cancelled event from Kuusamo (25 November) was rescheduled on the next day (26 November).)26 November 2005	(Finland) Kuusamo (Rukatunturi HS142)	L _{410}	(Czech Republic) Jakub Janda	(Finland) Janne Ahonen	(Slovenia) Robert Kranjec	(Czech Republic) Jakub Janda	
611	2	26 November 2005	(Finland) Kuusamo (Rukatunturi HS142)	L _{411}	(Slovenia) Robert Kranjec	(Finland) Janne Ahonen	(Germany) Michael Uhrmann	(Finland) Janne Ahonen (Slovenia) Robert Kranjec	
		3 December 2005	(Norway) Trondheim (Granåsen HS131)	L _{cnx}	cancelled due lack of snow and rescheduled to Lillehammer			—	
		4 December 2006	(Norway) Trondheim (Granåsen HS131)	L _{cnx}	cancelled due lack of snow and rescheduled to Lillehammer			—	
612	3	3 December 2005	(Norway) Lillehammer (Lysgårdsbakken HS134)	L _{412}	(Switzerland) Andreas Küttel	(Czech Republic) Jakub Janda	(Norway) Lars Bystøl	(Czech Republic) Jakub Janda	
613	4	4 December 2005	(Norway) Lillehammer (Lysgårdsbakken HS134)	L _{413}	(Czech Republic) Jakub Janda	(Norway) Lars Bystøl	(Switzerland) Andreas Küttel	(Czech Republic) Jakub Janda	
614	5	10 December 2005	(Czech Republic) Harrachov (Čerťák HS142)	L _{414}	(Switzerland) Andreas Küttel	(Germany) Michael Uhrmann	(Finland) Janne Ahonen	(Czech Republic) Jakub Janda	
615	6	11 December 2005	(Czech Republic) Harrachov (Čerťák HS142)	L _{415}	(Czech Republic) Jakub Janda	(Finland) Janne Ahonen	(Switzerland) Andreas Küttel	(Czech Republic) Jakub Janda	
		17 December 2005	(Switzerland) Engelberg (Gross-Titlis-Schanze HS137)	L _{cnx}	cancelled due to heavy snow			—	
616	7	18 December 2005	(Switzerland) Engelberg (Gross-Titlis-Schanze HS137)	L _{416}	(Czech Republic) Jakub Janda	(Germany) Michael Uhrmann	(Austria) Andreas Kofler	(Czech Republic) Jakub Janda	
617	8	29 December 2005	(Germany) Oberstdorf (Schattenbergschanze HS137)	L _{417}	(Finland) Janne Ahonen	(Norway) Roar Ljøkelsøy	(Czech Republic) Jakub Janda	(Czech Republic) Jakub Janda	
618	9	1 January 2006	(Germany) Garmisch-Pa (Gr. Olympiaschanze HS125)	L _{418}	(Czech Republic) Jakub Janda	(Finland) Janne Ahonen	(Finland) Matti Hautamäki	(Czech Republic) Jakub Janda	
619	10	4 January 2006	(Austria) Innsbruck (Bergiselschanze HS130)	L _{419}	(Norway) Lars Bystøl	(Czech Republic) Jakub Janda	(Norway) Bjørn Einar Romøren	(Czech Republic) Jakub Janda	
620	11	6 January 2006	(Austria) Bischofshofen (Paul-Ausserleitner HS140)	L _{420}	(Finland) Janne Ahonen	(Czech Republic) Jakub Janda	(Norway) Roar Ljøkelsøy	(Czech Republic) Jakub Janda	
54th Four Hills Tournament Overall (29 December 2005 – 6 January 2006)					(Czech Republic) Jakub Janda (Finland) Janne Ahonen		(Norway) Roar Ljøkelsøy	4H Tournament	
FIS Ski Flying World Championships 2006 (13 – 14 January • (Austria) Bad Mitterndorf)
621	12	21 January 2006	(Japan) Sapporo (Ōkurayama HS134)	L _{421}	(Norway) Bjørn Einar Romøren	(Norway) Roar Ljøkelsøy	(Japan) Takanobu Okabe	(Czech Republic) Jakub Janda	
622	13	22 January 2006	(Japan) Sapporo (Ōkurayama HS134)	L _{422}	(Norway) Roar Ljøkelsøy	(Japan) Daiki Itō	(Japan) Takanobu Okabe	(Czech Republic) Jakub Janda	
623	14	28 January 2006	(Poland) Zakopane (Wielka Krokiew HS134)	L _{423}	(Finland) Matti Hautamäki	(Finland) Tami Kiuru	(Finland) Janne Ahonen	(Czech Republic) Jakub Janda	
624	15	29 January 2006	(Poland) Zakopane (Wielka Krokiew HS134)	L _{424}	(Finland) Matti Hautamäki	(Finland) Janne Ahonen	(Austria) Thomas Morgenstern	(Czech Republic) Jakub Janda	
625	16	4 February 2006	(Germany) Willingen (Mühlenkopfschanze HS145)	L _{425}	(Austria) Andreas Kofler	(Austria) Thomas Morgenstern	(Switzerland) Andreas Küttel	(Czech Republic) Jakub Janda	
2006 Winter Olympics (12 – 18 February • (Italy) Pragelato)
626	17	5 March 2006	(Finland) Lahti (Salpausselkä HS130)	L _{426}	(Finland) Janne Happonen	(Czech Republic) Jakub Janda	(Germany) Michael Uhrmann	(Czech Republic) Jakub Janda	
627	18	7 March 2006	(Finland) Kuopio (Puijo HS127)	L _{427}	(Switzerland) Andreas Küttel	(Austria) Thomas Morgenstern	(Poland) Adam Małysz	(Czech Republic) Jakub Janda	
628	19	10 March 2006	(Norway) Lillehammer (Lysgårdsbakken HS134)	L _{428}	(Austria) Thomas Morgenstern	(Norway) Bjørn Einar Romøren	(Austria) Andreas Kofler	(Czech Republic) Jakub Janda	
629	20	12 March 2006	(Norway) Oslo (Holmenkollbakken HS128)	L _{429}	(Poland) Adam Małysz	(Austria) Thomas Morgenstern	(Austria) Andreas Kofler	(Czech Republic) Jakub Janda	
10th Nordic Tournament Overall (5 – 12 March 2006)					(Austria) Thomas Morgenstern	(Switzerland) Andreas Küttel	(Finland) Janne Happonen	Nordic Tournament	
630	21	18 March 2006	(Slovenia) Planica (Letalnica b. Gorišek HS215)	F _{061}	(Norway) Bjørn Einar Romøren	(Norway) Roar Ljøkelsøy	(Austria) Martin Koch	(Czech Republic) Jakub Janda	
631	22	19 March 2006	(Slovenia) Planica (Letalnica b. Gorišek HS215)	F _{062}	(Finland) Janne Happonen	(Austria) Martin Koch	(Slovenia) Robert Kranjec	(Czech Republic) Jakub Janda	
27th FIS World Cup Overall (25 November 2005 – 19 March 2006)					(Czech Republic) Jakub Janda	(Finland) Janne Ahonen	(Switzerland) Andreas Küttel	World Cup Overall	

=== Men's Team ===
All	No.	Date	Place (Hill)	Size	Winner	Second	Third
33	1	5 February 2006	(Germany) Willingen (Mühlenkopfschanze HS145)	L	Finland Tami Kiuru; Janne Happonen; Matti Hautamäki; Janne Ahonen	Austria Andreas Kofler; Andreas Widhölzl; Martin Koch; Thomas Morgenstern	Norway Bjørn Einar Romøren; Lars Bystøl; Sigurd Pettersen; Roar Ljøkelsøy
34	2	4 March 2006	(Finland) Lahti (Salpausselkä HS130)	L _{029}	Austria Andreas Widhölzl; Andreas Kofler; Martin Koch; Thomas Morgenstern	Norway Bjørn Einar Romøren; Tommy Ingebrigtsen; Lars Bystøl; Roar Ljøkelsøy	Finland Janne Happonen; Risto Jussilainen; Janne Ahonen; Matti Hautamäki

== Standings ==
=== Overall ===
Rank	after 22 events	Points
1	(Czech Republic) Jakub Janda	1151
2	(Finland) Janne Ahonen	1024
3	(Switzerland) Andreas Küttel	980
4	(Norway) Roar Ljøkelsøy	875
5	(Austria) Thomas_Morgenstern	846
6	(Norway) Bjørn Einar Romøren	757
7	(Austria) Andreas Kofler	699
8	(Germany) Michael Uhrmann	681
9	(Poland) Adam Małysz	634
10	(Austria) Andreas Widhölzl	594

=== Nations Cup ===
Rank	after 24 events	Points
1	Austria	3611
2	Norway	3525
3	Finland	3456
4	Germany	1869
5	Switzerland	1675
6	Japan	1620
7	Czech Republic	1388
8	Slovenia	915
9	Poland	786
10	Russia	389

=== Prize money ===
Rank	after 24 events	CHF
1	(Czech Republic) Jakub Janda	184,550
2	(Finland) Janne Ahonen	158,750
3	(Switzerland) Andreas Küttel	120,500
4	(Austria) Thomas_Morgenstern	109,750
5	(Norway) Roar Ljøkelsøy	97,750
6	(Norway) Bjørn Einar Romøren	86,250
7	(Austria) Andreas Kofler	72,750
8	(Finland) Matti Hautamäki	66,250
9	(Norway) Lars Bystøl	58,550
10	(Finland) Janne Happonen	55,500

=== Four Hills Tournament ===
Rank	after 4 events	Points
1	(Finland) Janne Ahonen	1081.5
	(Czech Republic) Jakub Janda	1081.5
3	(Norway) Roar Ljøkelsøy	1057.1
4	(Switzerland) Andreas Küttel	1022.9
5	(Finland) Matti Hautamäki	1018.0
6	(Japan) Takanobu Okabe	1017.8
7	(Norway) Bjørn Einar Romøren	997.9
8	(Austria) Andreas Kofler	992.8
9	(Japan) Noriaki Kasai	981.5
10	(Germany) Georg Späth	976.7

=== Nordic Tournament ===
Rank	after 4 events	Points
1	(Austria) Thomas_Morgenstern	1094.4
2	(Switzerland) Andreas Küttel	1079.9
3	(Finland) Janne Happonen	1074.9
4	(Austria) Andreas Kofler	1068.8
5	(Poland) Adam Małysz	1068.7
6	(Czech Republic) Jakub Janda	1067.5
7	(Norway) Bjørn Einar Romøren	1059.2
8	(Austria) Andreas Widhölzl	1056.9
9	(Austria) Martin Koch	1044.5
10	(Germany) Michael Uhrmann	1042.2

== See also ==
- 2005 Grand Prix (top level summer series)
- 2005–06 FIS Continental Cup (2nd level competition)
