= Anders Jacobsen (ski jumper) =

Norwegian ski jumper

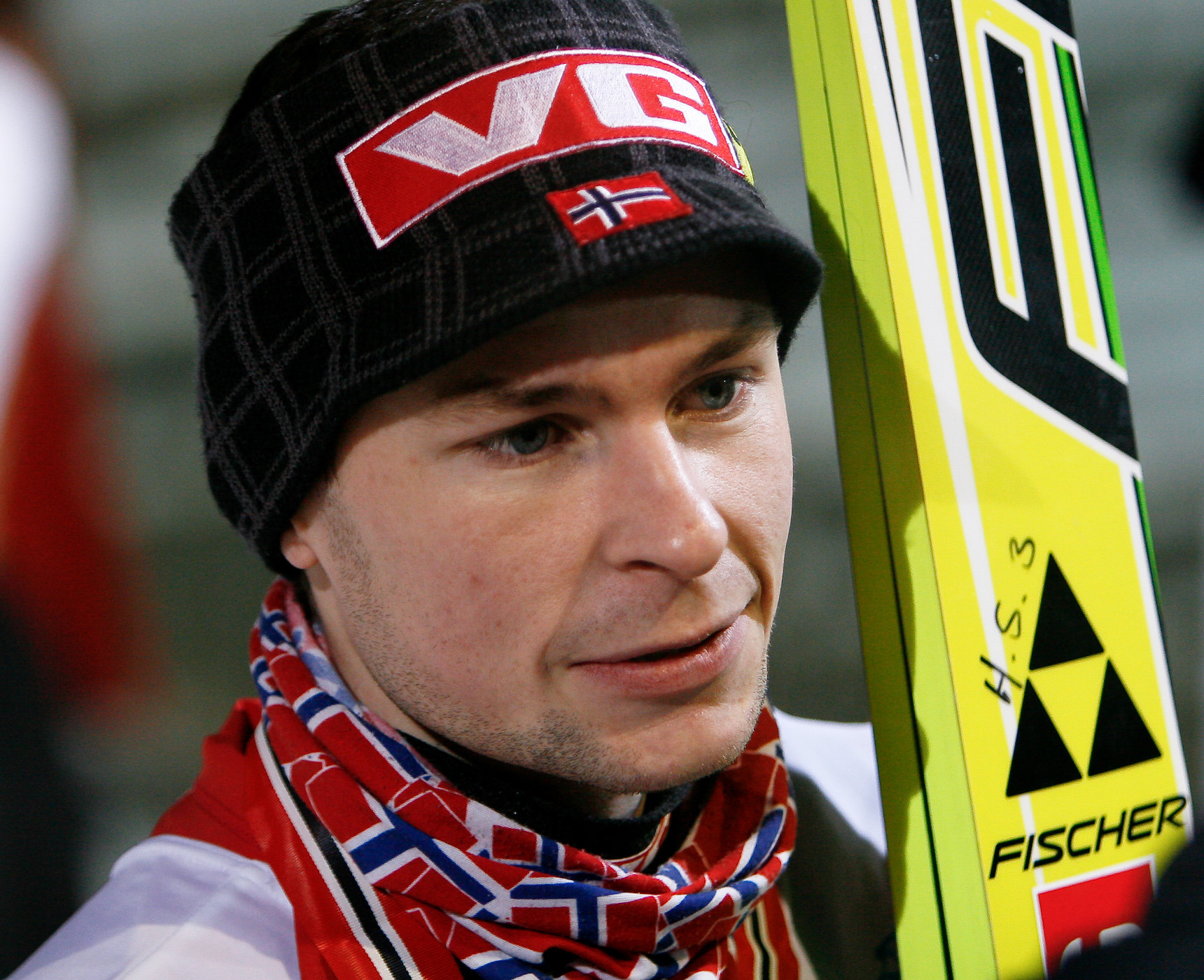
- Jacobsen in 2010

Personal information
- Nationality: Norway
- Born: 17 February 1985 (age 41) Hønefoss, Norway
- Height: 1.73 m (5 ft 8 in)

Sport
- Sport: Skiing
- Club: Ringkollen Skiklubb

World Cup career
- Seasons: 2007–2011; 2013–2015
- Indiv. starts: 164
- Indiv. podiums: 28
- Indiv. wins: 10
- Team starts: 26
- Team podiums: 20
- Team wins: 6
- Four Hills titles: 1 (2007)

Achievements and titles
- Personal bests: 230.5 m (756 ft); Planica, 20 March 2010
Medal record
Representing Norway
Men's ski jumping
Olympic Games
Bronze medal – third place	2010 Vancouver	Team LH
FIS Nordic World Ski Championships
Gold medal – first place	2015 Falun	Team LH
Silver medal – second place	2007 Sapporo	Team LH
Silver medal – second place	2009 Liberec	Team LH
Silver medal – second place	2011 Oslo	Team NH
Silver medal – second place	2011 Oslo	Team LH
Bronze medal – third place	2009 Liberec	Individual LH
Bronze medal – third place	2013 Val di Flemme	Individual LH
Men's ski flying
FIS Ski Flying World Championships
Silver medal – second place	2010 Planica	Team
Bronze medal – third place	2008 Oberstdorf	Team
Bronze medal – third place	2010 Planica	Individual
- Updated on 10 February 2016

Anders Jacobsen (Norwegian pronunciation: [ˈɑ̂nːəʂ ˈjɑ̀ːkɔpsn̩]; born 17 February 1985) is a Norwegian former ski jumper. He competed at the 2010 and 2014 Winter Olympics and won a team bronze medal in the large hill event in 2010. He is the youngest Norwegian winner of Four Hills Tournament.

== Career ==
=== Early career ===
Jacobsen made his debut in the Continental Cup on 11 January 2003, where he finished in the 50th position. In August the same year in a FIS Cup meeting in Rælingen, he placed 13th.

In 2006, Jacobsen was picked for one of the eight spots in the Norwegian World Cup team. He made his debut in the Grand Prix season on 4 August, in Hinterzarten, where he finished 7th in the team competition (with Tom Hilde, Lars Bystøl and Roar Ljøkelsøy). On 5 August, he was eighth; on 14 August, in Courchevel, he was fourth; on 24 August, in Zakopane he was seventh; on 30 September, in Klingenthal, he was sixth; on 4 October, in Oberhof, he was tenth. He was tenth in the Grand Prix, with 184 points.

=== 2006/07 season ===
After Daniel Forfang's retirement he remained in the current Norwegian squad. He made his debut in the 2006/07 Ski jumping World Cup in Kuusamo on 24 November 2006, with a third place.

Jacobsen won four World Cup events that season, including the Innsbruck event on 4 January 2007 on his way to becoming the overall winner of the 2006-07 Four Hills Tournament.

Entering the FIS Nordic World Ski Championships 2007 in Sapporo, Jacobsen led the overall Ski jumping World Cup standings. At those championships, he earned a silver medal in the team large hill. But he failed in the large hill competition, and finished 7th in the normal hill competition.

After the World Championships, Jacobsen struggled to maintain his form. He failed to qualify for the finals in Lahti, finished tenth in Kuopio, and 14th in the first Holmenkollen competition. Adam Małysz won all those races and therefore he overtook the lead in the World cup standings.

=== 2007/08 season ===
Not having his best season during 2007/2008, Jacobsen still won one world cup victory (being one of four Norwegian jumpers who each won a world cup victory that season), led the Norwegian team to three team wins in the world cup and a team-bronze in the ski flying world championships, and placed sixth overall in the world cup, behind teammates Tom Hilde and Anders Bardal.

=== 2008/09 season ===
As every Norwegian athlete, Jacobsen struggled to maintain the previous season's results in the 2008/2009 season, and had only one podium (3rd place in Trondheim early season) before entering the Four-Hills Tournament. There he showed growing shape, placing 6th overall. Before entering the World Championship, he placed second in the two last world cup races in Klingenthal and in the skiflying hill in Oberstdorf. The World Championship started dreadful for Jacobsen, falling from a bronze medal to 17th place after 86,5 m in the final round in the normal hill event. Yet again he placed third after the first round at the large hill event, winning the bronze medal after the race's cancellation. After winning a silver in the team large hill event Jacobsen won altogether two medals at the FIS Nordic World Ski Championships 2009 in Liberec. At the end of the season, he was eighth in the overall world cup standings.

=== 2009/10 season ===
Jacobsen started the season with a fifth place in the opening race in Kuusamo, but then fell during training, and his placings dropped, mostly varying between top 20 and top 30. However, during the Four Hills Tournament, in the race in Garmisch-Partenkirchen Jacobsen struck back with a fifth place, falling from second place. He eventually won his sixth world cup victory in ski flying hill in Oberstdorf on January 31.

== World Cup ==
=== Standings ===
Season	Overall	4H	SF	NT
2006/07	2nd place, silver medalist(s)	1st place, gold medalist(s)	N/A	19
2007/08	6	9	N/A	9
2008/09	8	6	5	15
2009/10	7	10	5	17
2010/11	19	10	16	N/A
2012/13	5	2nd place, silver medalist(s)	17	N/A
2013/14	51	13	—	N/A
2014/15	17	5	27	N/A

=== Wins ===
No.	Season	Date	Location	Hill	Size
1	2006/07	17 December 2006	(Switzerland) Engelberg	Gross-Titlis-Schanze HS137	LH
2	2006/07	4 January 2007	(Austria) Innsbruck	Bergiselschanze HS130	LH
3	2006/07	13 January 2007	(Norway) Vikersund	Vikersundbakken HS207 (night)	FH
4	2006/07	10 February 2007	(Germany) Willingen	Mühlenkopfschanze HS145 (night)	LH
5	2007/08	9 February 2008	(Czech Republic) Liberec	Ještěd A HS134 (night)	LH
6	2009/10	31 January 2010	(Germany) Oberstdorf	Heini-Klopfer-Skiflugschanze HS213	FH
7	2012/13	30 December 2012	(Germany) Oberstdorf	Schattenbergschanze HS137 (night)	LH
8	2012/13	1 January 2013	(Germany) Garmisch-Partenkirchen	Große Olympiaschanze HS140	LH
9	2012/13	12 January 2013	(Poland) Zakopane	Wielka Krokiew HS134 (night)	LH
10	2014/15	1 January 2015	(Germany) Garmisch-Partenkirchen	Große Olympiaschanze HS140	LH

=== Individual starts (164) ===
winner 1 ; second 2 ; third 3 ; disqualified dq ; did not compete (–); stuck in qualifications (q)
Season	1	2	3	4	5	6	7	8	9	10	11	12	13	14	15	16	17	18	19	20	21	22	23	24	25	26	27	28	29	30	31	Points
2006/07	Kuusamo	Lillehammer	Lillehammer	Engelberg	Engelberg	Oberstdorf	Garmisch-Partenkirchen	Innsbruck	Bischofshofen	Vikersund	Zakopane	Oberstdorf	Oberstdorf	Titisee-Neustadt	Titisee-Neustadt	Klingenthal	Willingen	Lahti	Kuopio	Oslo	Oslo	Planica	Planica	Planica								1319
2006/07	3	10	2	2	1	4	5	1	2	1	7	6	2	3	4	–	1	31	10	14	7	6	2	8								1319
2007/08	Kuusamo	Trondheim	Trondheim	Villach	Villach	Engelberg	Engelberg	Oberstdorf	Garmisch-Partenkirchen	Bischofshofen	Bischofshofen	Predazzo	Predazzo	Harrachov	Zakopane	Zakopane	Sapporo	Sapporo	Liberec	Liberec	Willingen	Kuopio	Kuopio	Lillehammer	Oslo	Planica	Planica					827
2007/08	6	–	–	–	–	38	10	8	16	23	8	21	3	3	2	6	4	16	16	1	10	3	15	13	6	4	8					827
2008/09	Kuusamo	Trondheim	Trondheim	Pragelato	Pragelato	Engelberg	Engelberg	Oberstdorf	Garmisch-Partenkirchen	Innsbruck	Bischofshofen	Tauplitz	Tauplitz	Zakopane	Zakopane	Whistler	Whistler	Sapporo	Willingen	Klingenthal	Oberstdorf	Lahti	Kuopio	Lillehammer	Vikersund	Planica	Planica					661
2008/09	32	3	8	10	42	35	23	6	7	10	7	4	4	–	–	dq	19	–	9	2	2	6	34	15	22	22	12					661
2009/10	Kuusamo	Lillehammer	Lillehammer	Engelberg	Engelberg	Engelberg	Oberstdorf	Garmisch-Partenkirchen	Innsbruck	Bischofshofen	Bad Mitterndorf	Bad Mitterndorf	Sapporo	Sapporo	Zakopane	Zakopane	Oberstdorf	Klingenthal	Willingen	Lahti	Kuopio	Lillehammer	Oslo									557
2009/10	5	40	36	30	18	15	24	5	5	10	40	13	–	–	–	7	1	7	2	41	3	20	15									557
2010/11	Kuusamo	Kuopio	Lillehammer	Lillehammer	Engelberg	Engelberg	Engelberg	Oberstdorf	Garmisch-Partenkirchen	Innsbruck	Bischofshofen	Harrachov	Harrachov	Sapporo	Sapporo	Zakopane	Zakopane	Zakopane	Willingen	Klingenthal	Oberstdorf	Vikersund	Vikersund	Lahti	Planica	Planica						344
2010/11	10	21	11	8	34	16	15	23	4	15	9	–	–	–	–	–	–	–	–	16	12	6	12	31	15	28						344
2012/13	Lillehammer	Lillehammer	Kuusamo	Krasnaja Polana	Krasnaja Polana	Engelberg	Engelberg	Oberstdorf	Garmisch-Partenkirchen	Innsbruck	Bischofshofen	Wisła	Zakopane	Sapporo	Sapporo	Vikersund	Vikersund	Harrachov	Harrachov	Klingenthal	Oberstdorf	Lahti	Kuopio	Trondheim	Oslo	Planica	Planica					878
2012/13	4	4	39	35	7	27	25	1	1	7	2	15	1	14	43	7	21	–	–	5	5	3	35	8	5	22	–					878
2013/14	Klingenthal	Kuusamo	Lillehammer	Lillehammer	Titisee-Neustadt	Titisee-Neustadt	Engelberg	Engelberg	Oberstdorf	Garmisch-Partenkirchen	Innsbruck	Bischofshofen	Tauplitz	Tauplitz	Wisła	Zakopane	Sapporo	Sapporo	Willingen	Willingen	Falun	Lahti	Lahti	Kuopio	Trondheim	Oslo	Planica	Planica				82
2013/14	–	–	q	–	34	17	–	–	30	26	16	11	–	–	32	29	–	–	–	–	13	37	42	–	–	–	–	–				82
2014/15	Klingenthal	Kuusamo	Kuusamo	Lillehammer	Lillehammer	Nizhny Tagil	Nizhny Tagil	Engelberg	Engelberg	Oberstdorf	Garmisch-Partenkirchen	Innsbruck	Bischofshofen	Tauplitz	Wisła	Zakopane	Sapporo	Sapporo	Willingen	Willingen	Titisee-Neustadt	Titisee-Neustadt	Vikersund	Vikersund	Lahti	Kuopio	Trondheim	Oslo	Oslo	Planica	Planica	511
2014/15	25	–	–	42	–	–	–	–	–	14	1	9	5	14	8	11	–	–	11	23	8	12	23	–	10	6	16	14	7	21	–	511

== Trivia ==
- He is the youngest Norwegian ski jumper in history to win the Four Hills Tournament (21 years old).
- Prior to his professional career, Jacobsen worked as a plumber.
