= Arttu Lappi =

Finnish ski jumper

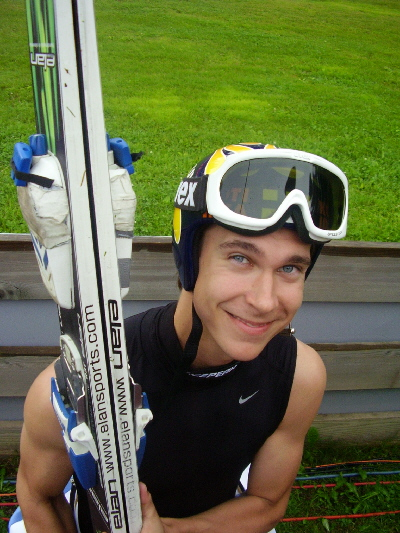
- Lappi in 2008

Personal information
- Full name: Arttu Ville Eemeli Lappi
- Nationality: Finland
- Born: 11 May 1984 (age 42) Kuopio, Finland
- Height: 1.77 m (5 ft 9 1/2 in)

Sport
- Sport: Skiing

World Cup career
- Seasons: 2002–2004; 2006–2008
- Indiv. starts: 61
- Indiv. podiums: 1
- Indiv. wins: 1
- Team starts: 2
- Team podiums: 2

Achievements and titles
- Personal bests: 204 m (669 ft); Vikersund, 11 January 2007
Medal record
Men's ski jumping
FIS Nordic World Ski Championships
Gold medal – first place	2003 Val di Fiemme	Team LH
- Updated on 10 February 2016

Arttu Ville Eemeli Lappi (born 11 May 1984) is a Finnish former ski jumper.

== Career ==
He won a gold medal in the team large event at the 2003 FIS Nordic World Ski Championships in Val di Fiemme and finished 6th in the individual normal hill at those same championships. Lappi's two individual victories were in individual large hill events in the United States in 2002 and in Kuusamo on 24 November 2006. His win in Kuusamo was his first World Cup victory.

== World Cup ==
=== Standings ===
Season	Overall	4H	NT
2001/02	48	—	25
2002/03	24	20	17
2003/04	—	57	—
2005/06	—	—	—
2006/07	15	6	36
2007/08	52	29	—

=== Wins ===
No.	Season	Date	Location	Hill	Size
1	2006/07	24 November 2006	(Finland) Kuusamo	Rukatunturi HS142 (night)	LH
