= Telemark landing =

Ski jumping landing

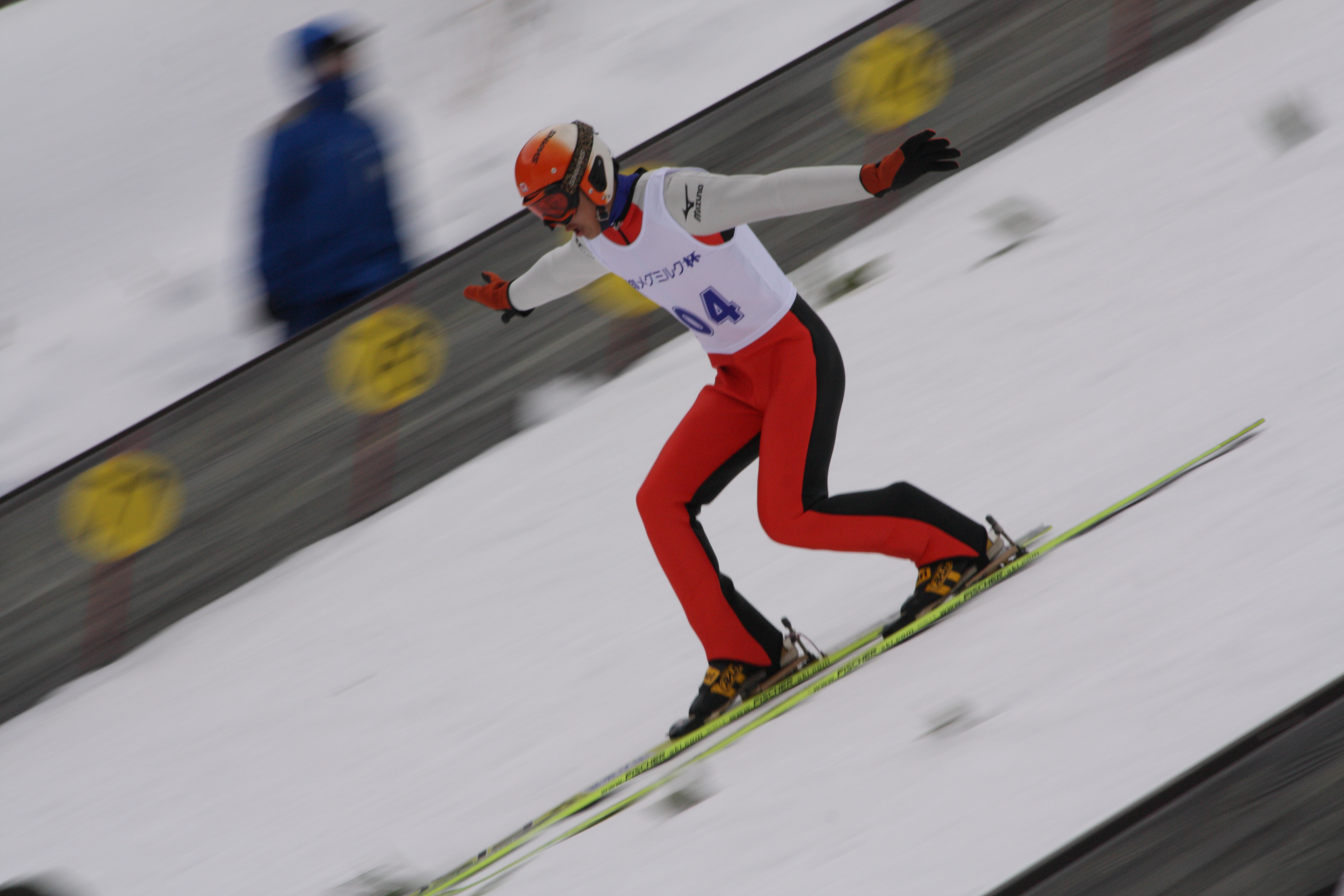
Telemark landing

The Telemark landing or just "Telemark", as it is referred to by experts, is a landing technique in ski jumping. It was first tested by Torju Torjussen in 1883 and is still considered a safe landing technique today. To perform this landing, the athlete pushes one ski a little more to the front and the other ski a little further back during the landing process. The landing point is not the ski binding but the point in the middle between the heel of the front foot and the toes of the back foot. The upper body should be erect while the knees are slightly bent to absorb the impact of the jump.

== Origin of the name ==
The name of this landing technique comes from the skiing technique known as Telemark skiing used in the Norwegian province of Telemark, where Torjussen came from and where the technique was first developed.

== Rating of the landing ==
The ski jumper should

- raise the head and upper body from a stable and ideal flight position and move the arms forwards and upwards laterally while the skis turn into a parallel position
- move into a lunge as well as slightly bend the knees just before touching the ground with the ends of the skis
- on contact with the ground, use their muscle power to actively reduce the impact that comes from landing and braking, which supports the elastic resistance forces of the skis as the ends bend back, and at the same time increase the lunge and bend the back leg even more (the Telemark position) while distributing the pressure of the landing evenly onto both legs when the skis are in a narrow position and stretching both arms horizontally forwards and upwards to maintain balance

=== Rating criteria ===
- Harmonious transition from the flight position to the landing position
- A slight step position and knee bending on first contact with the ground
- Active support of the braking coming from the elastic resistance forces of the skis as the ends bend back
- Stable handling of the landing impact through correctly bent knees (not too deep and not too long) and increasing the step position
- Fully developed Telemark leg position at the end of the breaking phase, i.e. medium step position (distance from the heel of the shoe in front to the toe cap of the back shoe approximately one shoe length, the toe cap of the back shoe should at least be behind the heel of the shoe in front) and a significantly deeper bending of the back leg
- Narrow and clean ski guidance (parallel and with a distance between the skis of not more than two ski widths as well as pressure on the total surface of both skis)

=== Deduction of points ===
- Maximum deduction of 5.0 points for the whole movement section
- Deduction of at least 2.0 points for lacking a Telemark leg position (i.e., landing with the feet parallel) at the end of the landing phase, known as a haferl landing (as an individual error)
