= Jörg Ritzerfeld =

German ski jumper

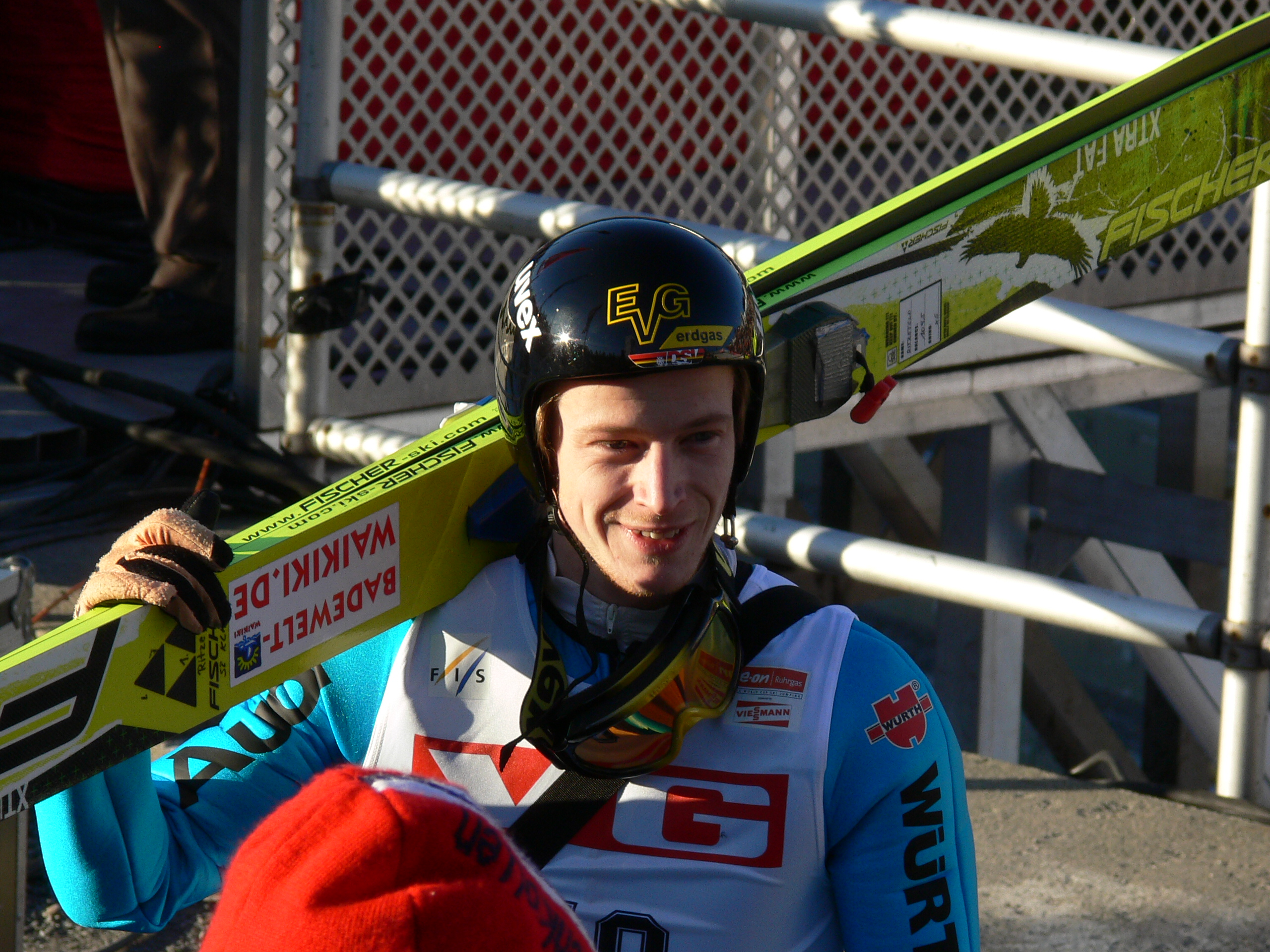
- Ritzerfeld in Oslo, 2007

Personal information
- Full name: Jörg Ritzerfeld
- Nationality: Germany
- Born: 28 June 1983 (age 43) Suhl, East Germany

Sport
- Sport: Skiing

World Cup career
- Seasons: 2001–2008
- Team podiums: 2

Achievements and titles
- Personal bests: 191.5 m (628 ft); Planica, 25 Mar 2007
- Updated on 26 May 2015

Jörg Ritzerfeld (born 28 June 1983) is a German former ski jumper who competed from 2001 to 2011. His best finishes at World Cup level were third in Pragelato on 12 February 2005 and in Willingen on 11 February 2007, both in team events.
