= Arthur Pauli =

Austrian ski jumper

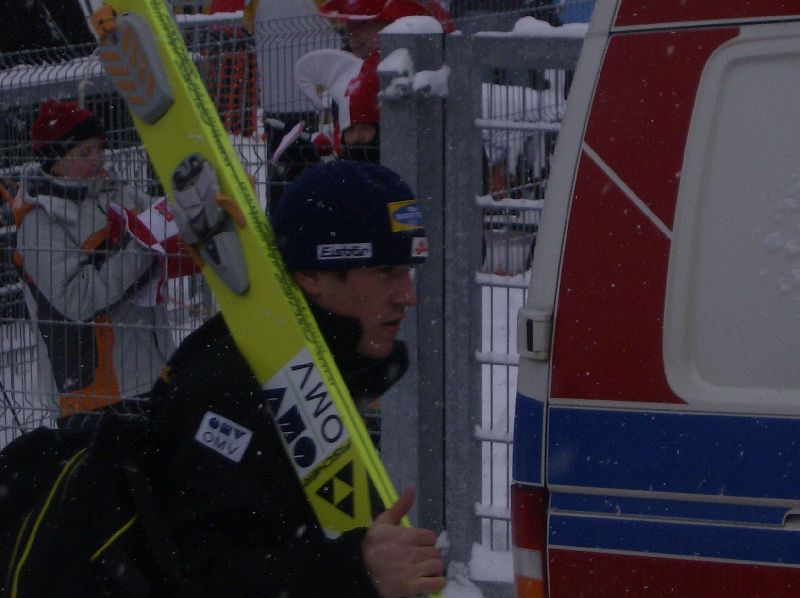

Personal information
- Full name: Arthur Pauli
- Nickname: Artl
- Born: 14 May 1989 (age 37) Ehenbichl, Austria
- Height: 174 cm (5 ft 9 in)

Sport
- Sport: Skiing
- Club: SC Ehrwald

World Cup career
- Seasons: 2007 - 2010
- Indiv. podiums: 0
- Indiv. wins: 0

Arthur Pauli (born 14 May 1989) is an Austrian former ski jumper.

He was a member of the Austrian team that won the Team World Cup at Mühlenkopfschanze, Germany in 2007.
