= Adam Małysz =

Polish ski jumper

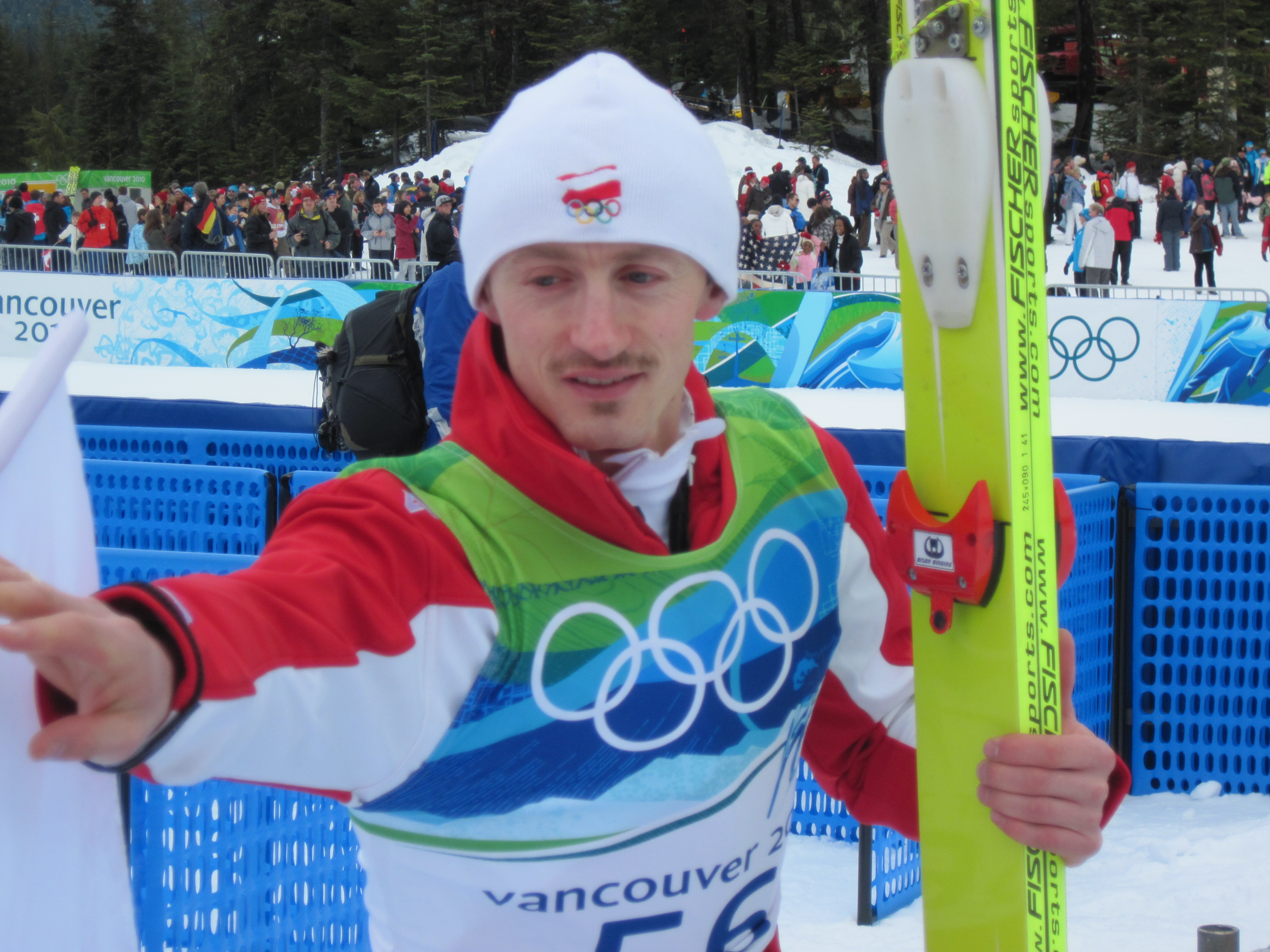
- Małysz at the 2010 Winter Olympics

Personal information
- Full name: Adam Henryk Małysz
- Nationality: Poland
- Born: 3 December 1977 (age 48) Wisła, Poland
- Height: 1.70 m (5 ft 7 in)

Sport
- Sport: Skiing

World Cup career
- Seasons: 1995–2011
- Indiv. starts: 350
- Indiv. podiums: 92
- Indiv. wins: 39
- Team podiums: 4
- Overall titles: 4 (2001, 2002, 2003, 2007)
- Four Hills titles: 1 (2001)
- Nordic titles: 3 (2001, 2003, 2007)

Achievements and titles
- Personal bests: 230.5 m (756 ft); Vikersund, 13 February 2011
Medal record
Men's ski jumping
Representing Poland
Event	1st	2nd	3rd
Olympic Games	0	3	1
Nordic World Championships	4	1	1
Ski Flying World Championships	0	0	0
Total	4	4	2
Olympic Games
Silver medal – second place	2002 Salt Lake City	Individual LH
Silver medal – second place	2010 Vancouver	Individual NH
Silver medal – second place	2010 Vancouver	Individual LH
Bronze medal – third place	2002 Salt Lake City	Individual NH
Nordic World Championships
Gold medal – first place	2001 Lahti	Individual NH
Gold medal – first place	2003 Val di Fiemme	Individual LH
Gold medal – first place	2003 Val di Fiemme	Individual NH
Gold medal – first place	2007 Sapporo	Individual NH
Silver medal – second place	2001 Lahti	Individual LH
Bronze medal – third place	2011 Oslo	Individual NH
- Updated on 30 March 2015

Adam Małysz
- Debut season: 2012
- Championships: Dakar Rally
- Best finish: 13 in 2014
- Statistics up to date as of 21 January 2014.

Adam Henryk Małysz ([ˈadam ˈmawɨʂ]; born 3 December 1977) is a Polish former ski jumper and rally driver. He competed in ski jumping from 1995 to 2011 and is one of the most successful athletes in the history of the sport. His many accomplishments include four World Cup titles (a male record shared with Matti Nykänen), four individual Winter Olympic medals, four individual World Championship gold medals (an all-time record), 39 individual World Cup competition wins, 96 World Cup podiums (individual and team), and being the first male ski jumper to win three consecutive World Cup titles. He is also a winner of the Four Hills Tournament, the only three-time winner of the Nordic Tournament, and a former ski flying world record holder.

After retiring from ski jumping, Małysz competed in the Dakar Rally in 2012, 2013 and 2014 finishing 37th, 15th and 13th respectively.

In 2018-2022 period he was a director-coordinator of ski jumping and Nordic combined at the Polish Ski Federation. On 25 June 2022, he was elected CEO of the Polish Ski Federation.

== Ski jumping career ==
Małysz began his senior-level ski jumping career on 4 January 1995, finishing seventeenth at the third event of the Four Hills Tournament in Innsbruck. In his first two World Cup seasons, he was moderately successful, winning in Oslo on 17 March 1996; in Sapporo on 18 January 1997; and in Hakuba on 26 January 1997. His breakthrough season came in 2000–01, when he won the Four Hills Tournament and ended Martin Schmitt's long run of success dating back to 1998–99. Małysz went on to dominate the season by reeling off five consecutive individual victories in Innsbruck, Bischofshofen, both ski flying competitions in Harrachov, and Park City. Further success came at the 2001 World Championships, in which he won a gold medal on the individual normal hill and silver on the individual large hill. He finished the season with a landslide points margin with three more consecutive wins in Falun, Trondheim and Oslo to claim his first Nordic Tournament title.

The 2001–02 season saw Małysz pick up where he left off, as he never once lost the lead in the World Cup standings. A streak of five wins by a highly motivated Sven Hannawald in December 2001 through January 2002 looked to threaten Małysz's run, but burnout prematurely ended Hannawald's challenge. Małysz picked up one last win of the season in Zakopane to the delight of his Polish fans, thereafter finishing consistently on the podium to claim his second World Cup title by a comfortable points margin. He also won silver on the individual large hill and bronze on the individual normal hill at the 2002 Winter Olympics in Park City.

Małysz faced stiff competition in defence of his World Cup title throughout the 2002–03 season. Despite second place at the season-opener in Kuusamo, he failed to win a competition for nearly four months. The lead of the overall standings changed hands several times until the final month of the season, by which time Małysz began to regain his form. At the 2003 World Championships in Predazzo, he won the gold medal in both the individual normal and large hill competitions. This was followed up by three straight wins, once in Oslo and twice in Lahti, securing his second Nordic Tournament title. Małysz ended the season on a high by equalling the then-world record of 225 metres (738 ft) in Planica, as well as fending off a late challenge by Sven Hannawald, who again finished runner-up in the overall World Cup standings—albeit with six wins to Małysz's three, and by a closer margin than before.

In the following years, as is the case with almost all ski jumpers in the prime of their career, Małysz was unable to maintain his previous form. He only managed twelfth in the 2003–04 season, finishing on the podium four times but without a win. 2004–05 saw an improvement with fourth place in the overall standings as well as four wins; these came on the large hill in Harrachov, the ski flying hill in Kulm, and a double win in Zakopane. The only highlights of Małysz's 2005–06 campaign, in which he finished ninth overall, were third place in Kuopio and a win in Oslo.

Małysz experienced a significant career resurgence in 2006–07, which began with a surprise win in Oberstdorf in January 2007. This was followed up by a double victory in Titisee-Neustadt, an individual gold medal on the normal hill at the 2007 World Championships, and a hat-trick of wins during the Nordic Tournament (Lahti, Kuopio, and Oslo) to win his third and final such title. The season was punctuated with a clean sweep of all three competitions in Planica, which enabled him to leapfrog his younger competitor Anders Jacobsen with only two competitions remaining. This secured Małysz a fourth World Cup title, equalling Matti Nykänen's record total in the 1980s.

Sporadic success from 2008 to 2011 saw Małysz achieve seventeen podiums, as well as silver medals in both the individual normal hill and large hill competitions at the 2010 Winter Olympics in Vancouver. A fitting end to Małysz's career came in the form of a home victory in Zakopane on 21 January 2011, an individual bronze medal on the normal hill at the 2011 World Championships in Oslo on 26 February, and third place at the season finale in Planica on 20 March. Małysz publicly announced his retirement from ski jumping six days later.

== Legacy and awards ==
Małysz's success contributed to his enormous popularity not only among ski jumping fans but throughout Poland as well. Additionally, he is the only five-time winner of the ski jumping event at the Holmenkollen Ski Festival (in 1996, 2001, 2003, 2006 and 2007), earning the Holmenkollen Medal in 2001 for his ski jumping victories (shared with Bente Skari and Thomas Alsgaard). He was also voted four times the Polish sportsman of the year (2001, 2002, 2003, 2007).

For his sporting achievements, he received the Order of Polonia Restituta:

Officer's Cross (4th Class), 2002
Commander's Cross (3rd Class), 2007
Commander's Cross with Star (2nd Class), 2010

A roundabout near Cedzyna, which was the site of a number of traffic incidents where a speeding car flew into the air, was nicknamed rondo Małysza in his honour.

== World Cup ==
=== Season titles ===
Season	Title
2000–01	Overall
2000–01	Four Hills Tournament
2000–01	Nordic Tournament
2001–02	Overall
2002–03	Overall
2002–03	Nordic Tournament
2006–07	Overall
2006–07	Nordic Tournament

=== Victories ===
	Day	Year	Location	Hill	K-point	HS	Jump 1	Jump 2	Note (points)
1.	17 March	1996	Oslo (Norway)	Holmenkollbakken	K-110	–	106,5 m	121,5 m	249.4
2.	18 January	1997	Sapporo (Japan)	Miyanomori	K-90	–	89,5 m	93,0 m	239.0
3.	26 January	1997	Hakuba Stadium (Japan)	Hakuba	K-120	–	121,0 m	125,5 m	246.7
4.	4 January	2001	Innsbruck (Austria)	Bergisel	K-108	–	111,5 m	118,5 m	259.2
5.	5 January	2001	Bischofshofen (Austria)	Paul-Ausserleitner-Schanze	K-120	–	127,0 m	134,0 m	274.8
6.	13 January	2001	Harrachov (Czech Republic)	Čerťák	K-185	–	206,5 m	194,5 m	392,7
7.	14 January	2001	Harrachov (Czech Republic)	Čerťák	K-185	–	212,0 m	194,5 m	397.8
8.	20 January	2001	Park City (United States)	Utah Olympic Park	K-120	–	129,5 m	133,5 m	276.4
9.	27 January	2001	Sapporo (Japan)	Okurayama	K-120	–	132,5 m	133,5 m	282.3
10.	28 January	2001	Sapporo (Japan)	Okurayama	K-120	–	132,5 m	136,0 m	283.8
11.	4 February	2001	Willingen (Germany)	Mühlenkopfschanze	K-120	–	142,5 m	142,5 m	316.0
12.	7 March	2001	Falun (Sweden)	Lugnet	K-115	–	119,5 m	124,0 m	259.8
13.	9 March	2001	Trondheim (Norway)	Granåsen	K-120	–	116,0 m	138,5 m	254.6
14.	11 March	2001	Oslo (Norway)	Holmenkollbakken	K-115	–	124,5 m	–	134.1
15.	23 November	2001	Kuopio (Finland)	Puijo	K-120	–	123,5 m	126,5 m	254.0
16.	1 December	2001	Titisee-Neustadt (Germany)	Hochfirstschanze	K-120	–	138,5 m	136,0 m	297.6
17.	8 December	2001	Villach (Austria)	Alpenarena	K-90	–	99,5 m	98,0 m	271.5
18.	16 December	2001	Engelberg (Switzerland)	Gross-Titlis-Schanze	K-120	–	132,0 m	134,5 m	281.7
19.	21 December	2001	Predazzo (Italy)	Trampolino Dal Ben	K-120	–	131,0 m	130,0 m	272.8
20.	22 December	2001	Predazzo (Italy)	Trampolino Dal Ben	K-120	–	132,0 m	132,5 m	282.1
21.	20 January	2002	Zakopane (Poland)	Wielka Krokiew	K-120	–	131.0 m	123,5 m	262.1
22.	9 March	2003	Oslo (Norway)	Holmenkollbakken	K-115	–	124,5 m	–	133.6
23.	14 March	2003	Lahti (Finland)	Salpausselkä	K-116	–	122,0 m	128,0 m	267.4
24.	15 March	2003	Lahti (Finland)	Salpausselkä	K-116	–	129,5 m	132,0 m	289.6
25.	11 December	2004	Harrachov (Czech Republic)	Čerťák	K-125	HS-142	143,0 m	136,0 m	284.2
26.	16 January	2005	Tauplitz (Austria)	Kulm	K-185	HS-200	207,0 m	209,5 m	412.3
27.	29 January	2005	Zakopane (Poland)	Wielka Krokiew	K-120	HS-134	129,5 m	131,0 m	268.9
28.	30 January	2005	Zakopane (Poland)	Wielka Krokiew	K-120	HS-134	132,0 m	132,0 m	278.2
29.	29 March	2006	Oslo (Norway)	Holmenkollbakken	K-115	HS-128	130,5 m	124,5 m	279.0
30.	27 January	2007	Oberstdorf (Germany)	Schattenbergschanze	K-120	HS-137	132,5 m	137,0 m	283.1
31.	3 February	2007	Titisee-Neustadt (Germany)	Hochfirstschanze	K-125	HS-142	138,5 m	145,0 m	293.8
32.	4 February	2007	Titisee-Neustadt (Germany)	Hochfirstschanze	K-125	HS-142	129,5 m	134,5 m	257.7
33.	11 March	2007	Lahti (Finland)	Salpausselkä	K-116	HS-130	125,0 m	128,0 m	265.8
34.	13 March	2007	Kuopio (Finland)	Puijo	K-120	HS-127	125,0 m	115,0 m	229.0
35.	17 March	2007	Oslo (Norway)	Holmenkollbakken	K-115	HS-128	131,0 m	122,0 m	272.9
36.	23 March	2007	Planica (Slovenia)	Letalnica	K-185	HS-215	208,5 m	221,5 m	423.5
37.	24 March	2007	Planica (Slovenia)	Letalnica	K-185	HS-215	210,5 m	217,5 m	419.6
38.	25 March	2007	Planica (Slovenia)	Letalnica	K-185	HS-215	220,0 m	–	215.0
39.	21 January	2011	Zakopane (Poland)	Wielka Krokiew	K-120	HS-134	138,5 m	128,5 m	269.9

=== Total podiums ===
1. Iron Mountain – 18 February 1996 (2nd place)
2. Lahti – 1 March 1996 (3rd place shared with Primož Peterka)
3. Falun – 13 March 1996 (2nd place)
4. Oslo/Holmenkollen – 17 March 1996 (1st place)
5. Bischofshofen – 6 January 1997 (2nd place)
6. Engelberg – 11 January 1997 (3rd place)
7. Sapporo – 18 January 1997 (1st place)
8. Hakuba – 26 January 1997 (1st place)
9. Garmisch-Partenkirchen – 1 January 2001 (3rd place)
10. Innsbruck – 4 January 2001 (1st place)
11. Bischofshofen – 6 January 2001 (1st place)
12. Harrachov (HS 205) – 13 January 2001 (1st place)
13. Harrachov (HS 205) – 14 January 2001 (1st place)
14. Salt Lake City – 20 January 2001 (1st place)
15. Sapporo – 27 January 2001(1st place)
16. Sapporo – 28 January 2001 (1st place)
17. Willingen – 3 February 2001 (2nd place)
18. Willingen – 4 February 2001 (1st place)
19. Oberstdorf (HS 213) – 4 March 2001 (2nd place)
20. Falun – 7 March 2001 (1st place)
21. Trondheim/Granasen – 9 March 2001 (1st place)
22. Oslo/Holmenkollen – 11 March 2001 (1st place)
23. Kuopio – 23 November 2001 (1st place)
24. Kuopio – 24 November 2001 (2nd place)
25. Titisee-Neustadt – 1 December 2001 (1st place)
26. Titisee-Neustadt – 2 December 2001 (2nd place)
27. Villach – 8 December 2001 (1st place)
28. Engelberg – 16 December 2001 (1st place)
29. Val di Fiemme/Predazzo – 21 December 2001 (1st place)
30. Val di Fiemme/Predazzo – 22 December 2001 (1st place)
31. Garmisch-Partenkirchen – 1 January 2002 (3rd place)
32. Innsbruck – 4 January 2002 (2nd place)
33. Zakopane – 20 January 2002 (1st place)
34. Lahti – 1 March 2002 (2nd place)
35. Trondheim – 15 March 2002 (2nd place)
36. Oslo/Holmenkollen – 17 March 2002 (3rd place)
37. Kuusamo – 29 November 2002 (2nd place)
38. Titisee-Neustadt – 14 December 2002 (3rd place)
39. Garmisch-Partenkirchen – 1 January 2003 (2nd place shared with Andreas Goldberger)
40. Zakopane – 18 January 2003 (3rd place)
41. Zakopane – 19 January 2003 (3rd place)
42. Tauplitz/Bad Mitterndorf – 1 February 2003 (3rd place)
43. Oslo/Holmenkollen – 9 March 2003 (1st place)
44. Lahti – 14 March 2003 (1st place)
45. Lahti – 15 March 2003 (1st place)
46. Planica (letalnica, HS215) – 22 March 2003 (2nd place)
47. Kuusamo – 28 November 2003 (2nd place)
48. Kuusamo – 30 November 2003 (2nd place)
49. Zakopane – 17 January 2004(2nd place)
50. Zakopane – 18 January 2004 (2nd place)
51. Harrachov (HS 142) – 11 December 2004 (1st place)
52. Oberstdorf (HS 137) – 29 December 2004 (3rd place)
53. Innsbruck – 3 January 2005 (2nd place)
54. Tauplitz/Bad Mitterndorf – 15 January 2005 (3rd place)
55. Tauplitz/Bad Mitterndorf – 16 January 2005 (1st place)
56. Titisee-Neustadt – 23 January 2005 (2nd place)
57. Zakopane – 29 January 2005 (1st place shared with Roar Ljøkelsøy)
58. Zakopane – 30 January 2005 (1st place)
59. Kuopio – 9 March 2005 (3rd place shared with Jakub Janda)
60. Kuopio – 7 March 2006 (3rd place)
61. Oslo/Holmenkollen – 12 March 2006 (1st place)
62. Lillehammer – 3 December 2006 (3rd place)
63. Engelberg – 16 December 2006 (3rd place)
64. Oberstdorf (HS 137) – 30 December 2006 (3rd place)
65. Oberstdorf (HS 137) – 27 January 2007 (1st place)
66. Titisee-Neustadt (HS 142) – 3 February 2007 (1st place)
67. Titisee-Neustadt (HS 142) – 4 February 2007 (1st place)
68. Klingenthal – 7 February 2007 (3rd place)
69. Lahti (HS 130) – 11 March 2007 (1st place)
70. Kuopio (HS 127) – 13 March 2007 (1st place)
71. Oslo/Holmenkollen (HS 128) – 17 March 2007 (1st place)
72. Planica (letalnica, HS215) – 23 March 2007 (1st place)
73. Planica (letalnica, HS215) – 24 March 2007 (1st place)
74. Planica (letalnica, HS215) – 25 March 2007 (1st place)
75. Kuopio/Puijo – 10 March 2009 (3rd place)
76. Planica (letalnica, HS215) – 20 March 2009 (2nd place)
77. Planica (letalnica, HS215) – 22 March 2009 (2nd place)
78. Lillehammer – 5 December 2009 (3rd place)
79. Klingenthal – 3 February 2010 (2nd place)
80. Lahti (HS 130) – 7 March 2010 (2nd place)
81. Kuopio (HS 127) – 9 March 2010 (2nd place)
82. Lillehammer – 12 March 2010 (3rd place)
83. Oslo/Holmenkollen – 14 March 2010 (2nd place)
84. Engelberg – 18 December 2010 (2nd place)
85. Engelberg – 19 December 2010 (3rd place)
86. Garmisch-Partenkirchen – 1 January 2011 (3rd place)
87. Innsbruck – 3 January 2011 (2nd place)
88. Harrachov (HS 205) – 8 January 2011 (3rd place)
89. Sapporo – 15 January 2011 (3rd place)
90. Zakopane – 21 January 2011 (1st place)
91. Vikersund – 13 February 2011 (3rd place)
92. Planica (letalnica, HS215) – 20 March 2011 (3rd place)

== Personal life ==
Adam Małysz was born in Wisła, Poland, to Ewa and Jan Małysz. He has an older sister – Iwona (born 1975). He graduated from a vocational high school in Ustroń, where he learned a profession (specialisation: tinsmith-roofer). He speaks German very well. On 16 June 1997, he married Izabella Polok (born 4 December 1978). The wedding took place at the Evangelical Church of St. Peter and Paul in the Wisła (Izabella is Catholic). On 31 October 1997, Izabella gave birth to their daughter – Karolina. His life motto is "Be good and that's it" and his idol is a German former ski jumper Jens Weißflog. His religion is Lutheranism.

On 1 April 2007 Małysz opened a Trophy Gallery, which includes all the major medals and trophies he won during his career, including the Crystal Globe trophies for victories in the World Cup. The Gallery is located in the building of the Izabella and Adam Małysz Foundation in Wisła, Poland.

== See also ==
- Sport in Poland
- Poland at the Winter Olympics
- List of Poles

Records
Preceded by Andreas Goldberger	World's longest ski jump 225 m (738 ft); 20 March 2003 – 20 March 2003	Succeeded by Matti Hautamäki
