= Andreas Küttel =

Swiss ski jumper

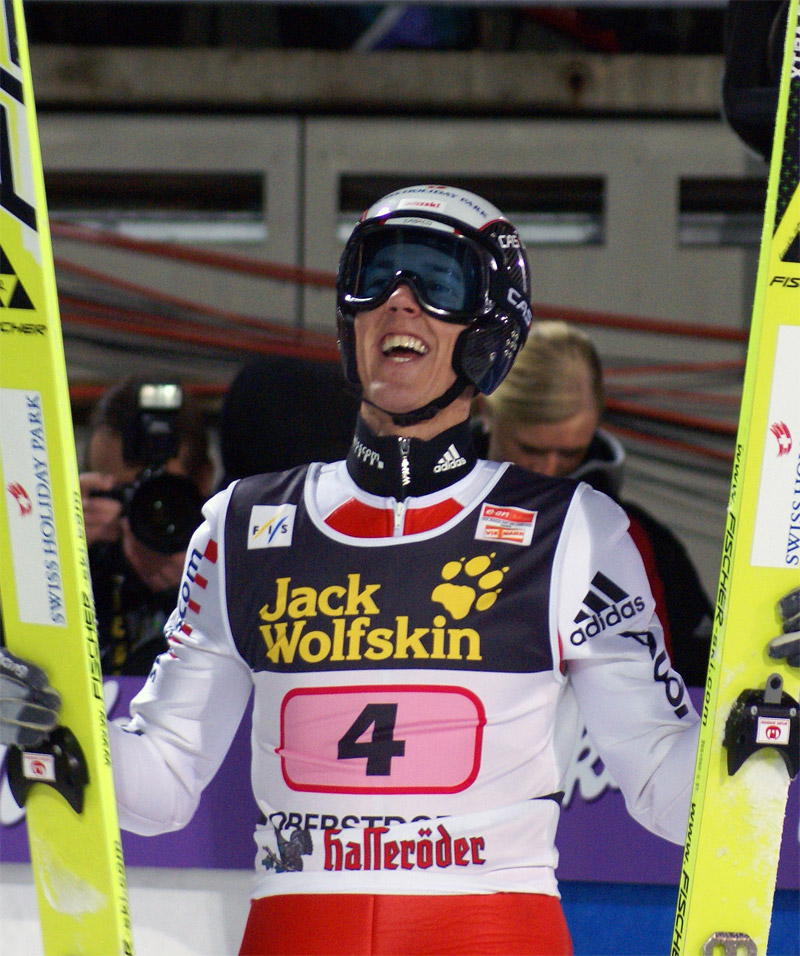
- Küttel in Oberstdorf, 2006

Personal information
- Nationality: Switzerland
- Born: 25 April 1979 (age 47) Einsiedeln, Switzerland
- Height: 1.82 m (6 ft 0 in)

Sport
- Sport: Skiing

World Cup career
- Seasons: 1996–2011
- Indiv. starts: 241
- Indiv. podiums: 15
- Indiv. wins: 5
- Team starts: 17

Achievements and titles
- Personal bests: 222 m (728 ft); Planica, 18 March 2006
Medal record
Men's ski jumping
Representing Switzerland
World Championships
Gold medal – first place	2009 Liberec	Individual LH
- Updated on 10 February 2016

Andreas Küttel (born 25 April 1979) is a Swiss former ski jumper who currently works in the field of sports science at the University of Southern Denmark.

== Career ==
Küttel won five World Cup competitions from 2005 to 2007, and placed third in the overall World Cup in 2006. He won a gold medal in the individual large hill event at the 2009 Ski Jumping World Championships. Küttel also competed at three Winter Olympics, earning his best finish of fifth in the individual normal hill event in 2006.

== World Cup ==
=== Standings ===
Season	Overall	4H	SF	NT	JP
1995/96	32	25	—	N/A	29
1996/97	—	66	—	—	—
1997/98	—	—	—	—	—
1998/99	69	—	—	—	65
1999/00	57	—	—	—	57
2000/01	48	24	—	45	N/A
2001/02	30	39	N/A	30	N/A
2002/03	60	40	N/A	—	N/A
2003/04	23	20	N/A	31	N/A
2004/05	17	14	N/A	10	N/A
2005/06	3rd place, bronze medalist(s)	4	N/A	2nd place, silver medalist(s)	N/A
2006/07	5	5	N/A	8	N/A
2007/08	7	6	N/A	21	N/A
2008/09	11	16	16	11	N/A
2009/10	33	40	36	42	N/A
2010/11	—	—	—	N/A	N/A

=== Wins ===
No.	Season	Date	Location	Hill	Size
1	2005/06	3 December 2005	(Norway) Lillehammer	Lysgårdsbakken HS134 (night)	LH
2	2005/06	9 December 2005	(Czech Republic) Harrachov	Čerťák HS142	LH
3	2005/06	7 March 2006	(Finland) Kuopio	Puijo HS127 (night)	LH
4	2006/07	1 January 2007	(Germany) Garmisch-Partenkirchen	Große Olympiaschanze HS125	LH
5	2007/08	23 December 2007	(Switzerland) Engelberg	Gross-Titlis-Schanze HS137	LH
