= Veikko Törmänen =

Finnish artist (born 1945)

- Born: 7 June 1945; Kuusamo, Finland
- Known for: Painting, installation

Veikko Johannes Törmänen (born 7 June 1945) is a Finnish artist, who paints and makes graphic art. His works were displayed for the first time in a solo exhibition in Oulu, Finland, in 1972.

Törmänen paints abstract works and makes installations. He has collaborated with architects and has made many public works since 1979. His works combine various techniques and materials.

In the 1970s Törmänen painted gouache and water colour works based on a close study of objects. In the end of the 1980s he painted large, structuredcolor fields with events taking place along the sides of the works. At this time he also produced collages of various objects and experimented with different materials. In the beginning of the 1990s he was struck by the shape of dot, stating that at that time he blew up the color fields into the black dots in his works. He was fascinated by the fact that dot is the basic element of industrially produced image. His show in Oulu Art Museum in 1999 was titled "Contrast".

According to art critics Törmänen's art relies on a peculiar diversion of visual sense, dealing with purely aesthetic optical illusion. He has been considered a reducer, whose works consist of colour, form and their interplay. Törmänen states that his aesthetics is the visual experience they produce and that he doesn't tell stories. He says that he has always wanted to embody movement and interaction, a kind of mirroring of different elements with each others.

Among his paintings and installations Törmänen has designed unconventional chairs and other objects. An example of this work is the interior design of the guest room in the State Provincial Office of Oulu with paintings, fireplace, an iron chair and a glass table. He has stated he is not afraid of decoration anymore.

Törmänen was born in Kuusamo, but lives and works in Oulu. He is married to author Sinikka Laine.

== Public works ==
- Moving Out, The Travel, The Time, August, a series of serigraphy, Lassintalo, Oulu, 1978
- Celebration Day, oil, Rajakylä primary school, Oulu, 1980
- Pause, oil, Myllyoja primary school, Oulu, 1980
- Forte Fortissimo, oil/acrylics, Music Hall, Oulu, 1985
- East West Home is Best, serigraphy, Knuutilankangas primary school, Oulu, 1989
- Northeast, acrylics, Kuusamo library, 1990
- Border Remarks, a series of collage, The Center for Youth and Culture, Oulu. 1993
- Calendar, collage, The State Provincial Office of Oulu, 1995
- Arche of Life, mural, Oulu Cathedral, 1997
- Grid, painting on concrete, Laanila school, 2002
- Blossoming, steel/acrylics, Jouni La Réserve, Nice, 2006
- Upwards, acrylics, Modern Art Museum Ars Nova, Turku, 2007
- Reflection, ODL Health Centre, Oulu, 2008

== Literature ==
- Ilpo Okkonen, Ullamaria Pallasmaa: Reunahuomautuksia. Veikko Törmänen teoksia 1975-2007, Studio Ilpo Okkonen Oy, 2008 ISBN 978-952-5109-22-1 (in Finnish, English, and French)
- Reijo Rinnekangas: Pohjoista valoa, Pohjoinen, 1990 ISBN 951-749-119-0 (in Finnish)
