= Karoliina Honkala =

Finnish chemist and academic

- Born: 1973 (age 52–53); Kuusamo
- Education: University of Oulu
- Scientific career
- Workplaces: University of Jyväskylä; Technical University of Denmark
- Thesis: Ab initio studies of O, O[sub2, CO and NO on Al(111) and Pd(111) surfaces] (2001)

Karoliina Honkala (born 1973) is a Finnish chemist who is a professor at the University of Jyväskylä. Her research considers heterogeneous and electro-catalysis. She was awarded the 2015 Berzelius Award of the Nordic Catalysis Society and elected to the Finnish Academy of Science and Letters in 2022.

== Academic career ==
Honkala was born in Kuusamo. She was a doctoral student in computational chemistry at the University of Oulu. Her doctoral research involved Ab initio studies of oxygen, carbon monoxide and nitrogen monoxide on metal (Al(111) and Pd(111)) surfaces. Honkala was then made a research professor at the Technical University of Denmark. She moved to the Academy of Finland in 2005, where she worked as a postdoctoral researcher.

== Research and career ==
In 2006, Honkala moved to the University of Jyväskylä. That year she was made a docent in physical chemistry. She was made a professor of Computational Nanocatalysis in 2016. Her research considers surface science and catalysis. She has focused on the heterogeneous catalysis of hydrocarbonsl, catalysis on the surface of substances and electro-catalysis.

Whilst her initial research involved improving catalytic activity, she has made considerable efforts to improve selectivity for specific reactions. She has mainly considered transition metals, nanostructure surfaces and nano clusters. She has developed several computational strategies, including density functional theory and Monte Carlo methods.

== Academic service ==
Honkala has served as President of the Finnish Catalyst Association. She has represented Finland on the Council of the European Federation for Catalysis. She was awarded the 2015 Berzelius Award of the Nordic Catalysis Society and was elected to the Finnish Academy of Science and Letters in 2022.

== Selected publications ==
- Honkala K; Hellman A; Ioannis N Remediakis; Logadottir A; Anna Carlsson; Dahl S; Christensen CH; Nørskov JK (1 January 2005). "Ammonia synthesis from first-principles calculations". Science. 307 (5709): 555–558. doi:10.1126/science.1106435. ISSN 0036-8075. PMID 15681379. Wikidata Q47622744.
- Ronnie T Vang; Karoliina Honkala; Søren Dahl; et al. (23 January 2005). "Controlling the catalytic bond-breaking selectivity of Ni surfaces by step blocking". Nature Materials. 4 (2): 160–162. doi:10.1038/nmat1311. ISSN 1476-1122. PMID 15665835. Wikidata Q81308426.
- Hellman A; Baerends EJ; Małgorzata Biczysko; et al. (1 September 2006). "Predicting catalysis: understanding ammonia synthesis from first-principles calculations". The Journal of Physical Chemistry B. 110 (36): 17719–17735. doi:10.1021/jp056982h. ISSN 1520-6106. PMID 16956255. Wikidata Q40290697.
