= Törmäsenvaara =

Village in Kuusamo, Finland

Coordinates: 65°54′22″N 29°28′16″E

Törmäsenvaara is a village in the town of Kuusamo in North Ostrobothnia, Finland.
