= Hyrynsalmi-Kuusamo Line =

Hyrynsalmi–Kuusamo

Technical
- Line length: 178 km (111 mi)
- Track gauge: 750 mm (2 ft 5 1/2 in)

The Hyrynsalmi–Kuusamo railway line was built by the German Wehrmacht in the middle of Finland near the Soviet border.

== History ==
After Hyrynsalmi got a railway connection in 1939, the Wehrmacht tried to reach the city of Kuusamo 178 km away during World War II. A Heeresfeldbahn was built with the track gauge of 750 mm. Construction began on 1 July, 1942. By July of 1943 around 129-187 tons of goods per day were being transported by over 30 locomotives and 1,507 cars. Locomotives were of various types, including the HF-110C and KML-3. Nine of the locomotives used (designated HF M 13792-13800) were H130D models.

The Heeresfeldbahn was mostly complete by 1944. Stations included Vääkiö in Suomussalmi, Korvu and Isokumpu in Taivalkoski and Sänkikangas in Kuusamo, with the control center in Hyrynsalmi. Close to 3,000 people worked to build the line, mostly Russian prisoners of war along with forced laborers from Poland. Working conditions were poor and discipline harsh. Many died from starvation, punishment, and exposure to the elements.

With the advance of the Soviet Army in the Fall of 1944, operation of the track was shut down, starting on September 14th. The Germans destroyed military installations, private property, and other buildings to keep them from being used by the Finns and Soviets, as well as the railway itself. They also burned villages situated along the railroad during their retreat. After World War II was over, the Soviets demanded that the Finns remove the remaining tracks. Locals have referred to the line as the "Railroad of Death".

A Finnish 1,524 mm (5 ft) broad gauge line between Hyrynsalmi and Taivalkoski opened in 1961, which mostly shared the old route as far as Korvua. The line was closed in 2005.

== Gallery ==
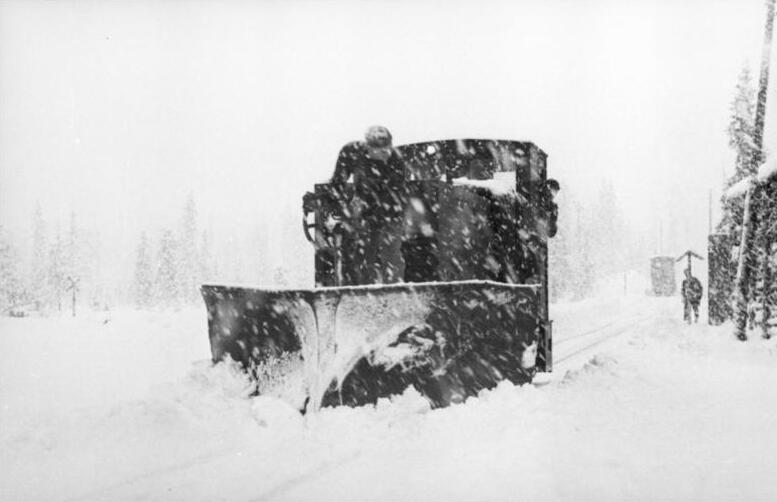
HF130C locomotive with snow plow

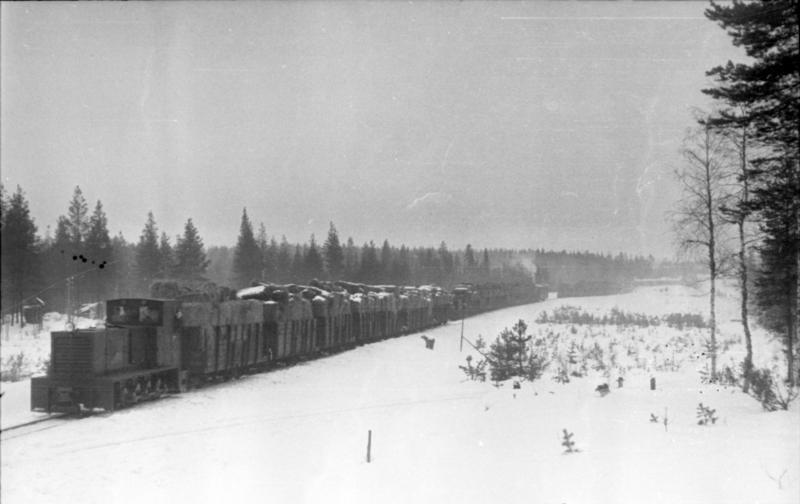
HF130C locomotive

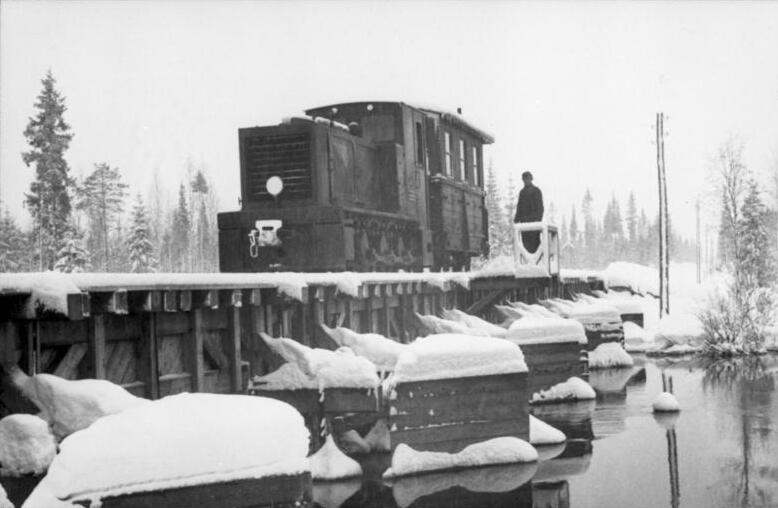
HF130C locomotive

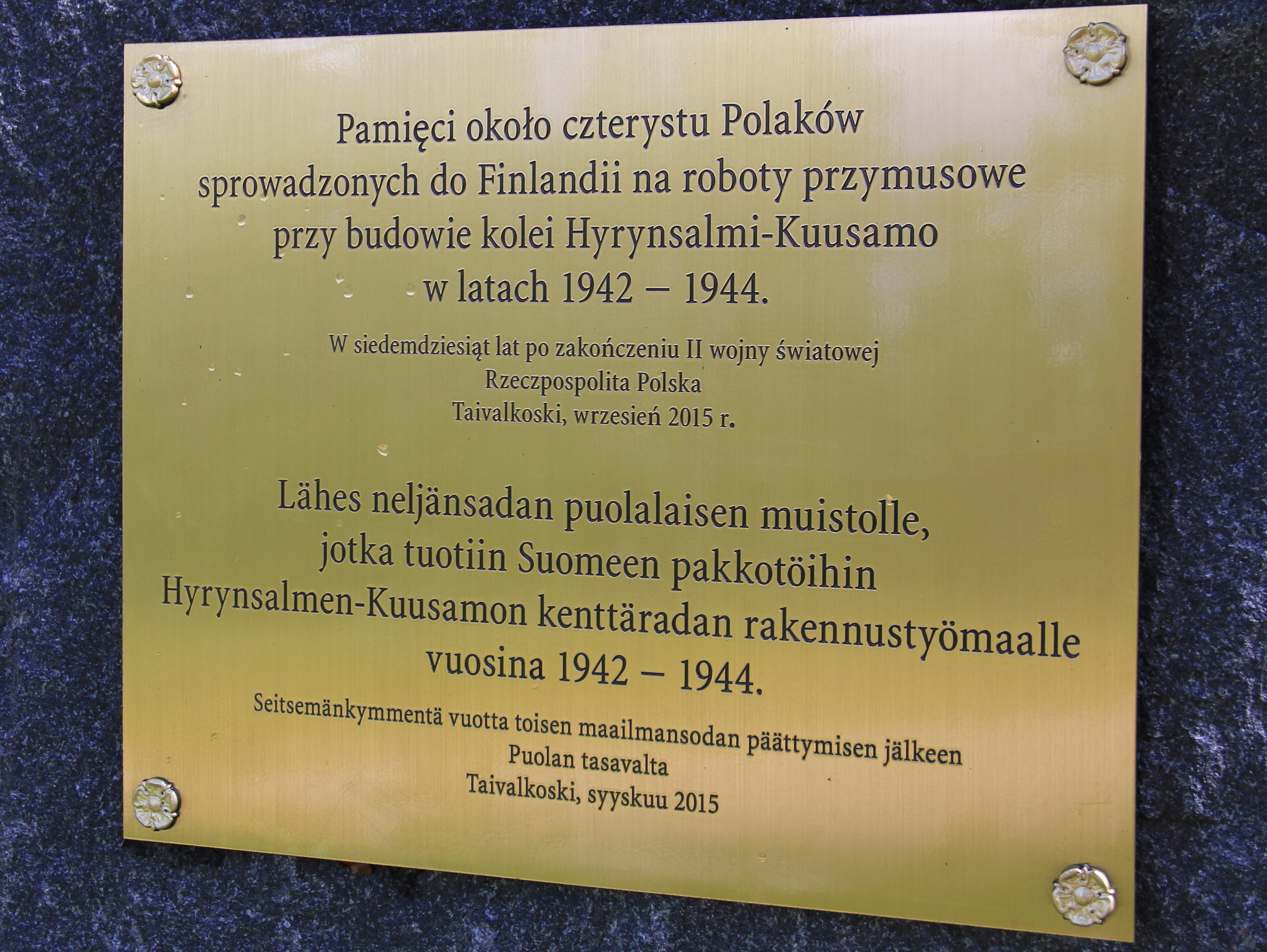
Plaque in memorial for victims of Hyrynsalmi – Kuusamo trench railway line in Taivalkoski, Finland.

== Literature ==
- Lars Westerlund: Saksan vankileirit Suomessa ja raja-alueilla 1941-1944 , Helsinki: Tammi, 2008, ISBN 978-951314277-3.
- DVD "Kuolemanrata". A film by Timo Koivisto, Nimbus-Filmi, 1999.
