= Kuusamo =

- Town and municipality
- Kuusamon kaupunki Kuusamo stad
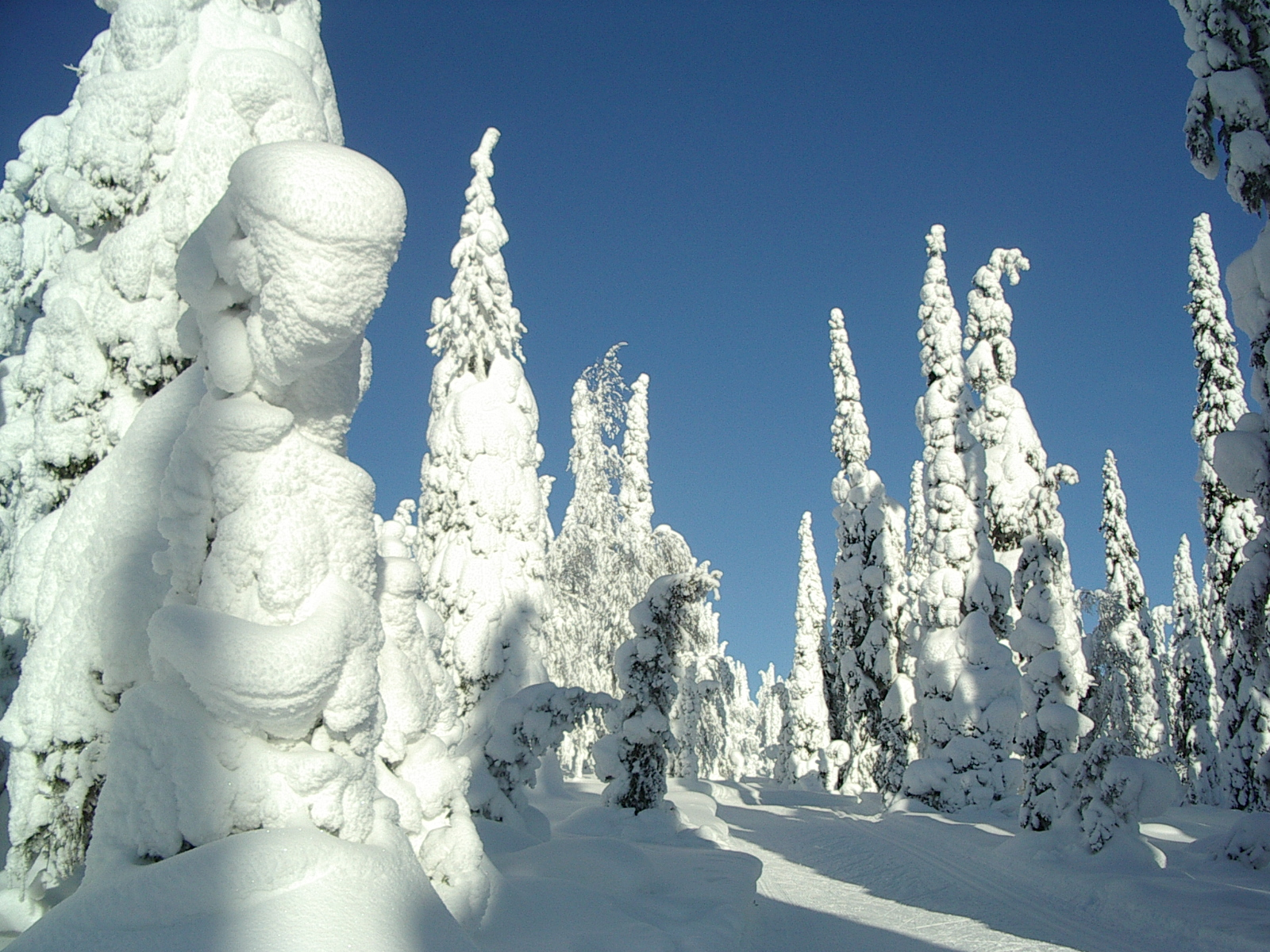
- Snow-covered trees in Kuusamo

- Coat of arms

- Location of Kuusamo in Finland
- Interactive map of Kuusamo
- Coordinates: 65°58′N 029°11′E
- Country: Finland
- Region: North Ostrobothnia
- Sub-region: Koillismaa
- Charter: 1868

Government
  - Town manager: Jouko Manninen

Area (2018-01-01)
  - Total: 5,808.92 km^{2} (2,242.84 sq mi)
  - Land: 4,978.85 km^{2} (1,922.34 sq mi)
  - Water: 830.81 km^{2} (320.78 sq mi)
  - Rank: 11th largest in Finland

Population (2025-12-31)
  - Total: 14,800
  - Rank: 75th largest in Finland
  - Density: 2.97/km^{2} (7.7/sq mi)

Population by native language
  - Finnish: 94.7% (official)
  - Swedish: 0.3%
  - Others: 5%

Population by age
  - 0 to 14: 14.8%
  - 15 to 64: 56.9%
  - 65 or older: 28.3%
- Time zone: UTC+02:00 (EET)
  - Summer (DST): UTC+03:00 (EEST)
- Website: www.kuusamo.fi/en/

Kuusamo (Finnish: [ˈkuːsɑmo]; Northern Sami: Guossán; Inari Sami: Kuáccám; Russian: Куусамо) is a town and municipality in Finland. It is located in Koillismaa, the northeastern part of the Northern Ostrobothnia region. The municipality has a population of 14,800 (31 December 2025) and covers an area of 5,808.92 square kilometres (2,242.84 sq mi) of which 830.81 km^{2} (320.78 sq mi) is water. The population density is 2.97 inhabitants per square kilometre (7.7/sq mi).

The municipality is unilingually Finnish.

Kuusamo is a major center for winter sports and receives approximately a million tourists every year. One of the largest ski resorts in Finland, Ruka, is situated in Kuusamo. Ruka is also the host of many international competitions in ski jumping, cross-country skiing, and Nordic combined. The 2005 World Championships of Freestyle Skiing was held in Kuusamo. Kuusamo Airport is located 6 kilometres (4 mi) northeast of Kuusamo's town centre.

== History ==
=== Sami settlement ===
Until the 17th century, the area of Kuusamo was inhabited by the semi-nomadic Sami. During the cold season they lived in the villages Maanselkä and Kitka. In spring they moved to the rivers and in summer, after the melting of the ice, to the lakes; there they fished and gathered berries and mushrooms; in autumn they hunted reindeer, bears and beavers in the forest. Apart from fishing and hunting the Sami earned their living by trading fur with the Finns settled on the coast of the Gulf of Bothnia and the Karelians of the White Sea coast.

As a Sami settlement the area belonged to Kuusamo Kemi-Lappmark at the time. Nominally it belonged to the territory of the Swedish province of Västerbotten, but the Swedish rule was limited to the collection of taxes. At the same time Russia collected taxes in the territory it deemed state-less.

=== Swedish domination ===
From the 15th century Finnish fishermen also took advantage of the fishing grounds on the lower reaches of the river Iijoki near Kuusamo. They took regular trips of a few weeks from Kuusamo, but because the land could not provide hay for the cattle other than near the river, they founded no fixed settlements. Only when, in 1673, the Swedish government granted all settlers in Lapland a tax exemption for 15 years, did settlers from Savo and Kainuu settle in Kuusamo. They practiced slash and burn as a form of shifting cultivation. This put the Sami's hunting way of life at risk. Within a few decades the Sami population was assimilated or ousted by the Finnish settlers. By 1718 there were only two Sámi families in Kuusamo, who had already adopted the Finnish language.

The first parish in Kuusamo was founded in 1685. In 1687 a temporary chapel was built, in 1695 the first church. From the end of the 17th century the area around the lake Kuusamojärvi began to be called Kuusamo. The precise etymology of the name is unclear, however, one possible derivation is from a Sami word for "spruce forest".

The Swedish–Russian border had already been withdrawn east of Kuusamo in the 1595 Treaty of Teusina, but was long and porous. With the constant influx of new settlers, Kuusamo grew steadily in the 18th century. Agriculture, cattle and reindeer husbandry replaced nomadic cropping. Kuusamo around 1770 had about 2,000 inhabitants. In 1775 Kuusamo was removed from Lappmark and added to the newly formed province of Oulu. Because the population had increased, a new, larger church was built between 1797 and 1804. By the beginning of the 19th century the population had reached 3000 inhabitants, but a famine in 1803 and a smallpox epidemic the following year reduced the population again.

=== Russian domination ===
In 1809, Kuusamo, like the rest of Finland, came under Russian rule. In the first half of the 19th century, the area was ravaged several times by devastating famine and epidemics. Kuusamo was spared by the catastrophic crop failure in 1867, and its population grew steadily thereafter. By 1886, 7,000 people inhabited the city; by 1894, that number grew to 8,000. With the advent of forestry at the end of the 19th century, workers moved into the area, so Kuusamo reached a population of 10,500 by 1910. In 1868, in Finland's administrative reform the parish of Kuusamo became a municipality.

=== Since independence ===
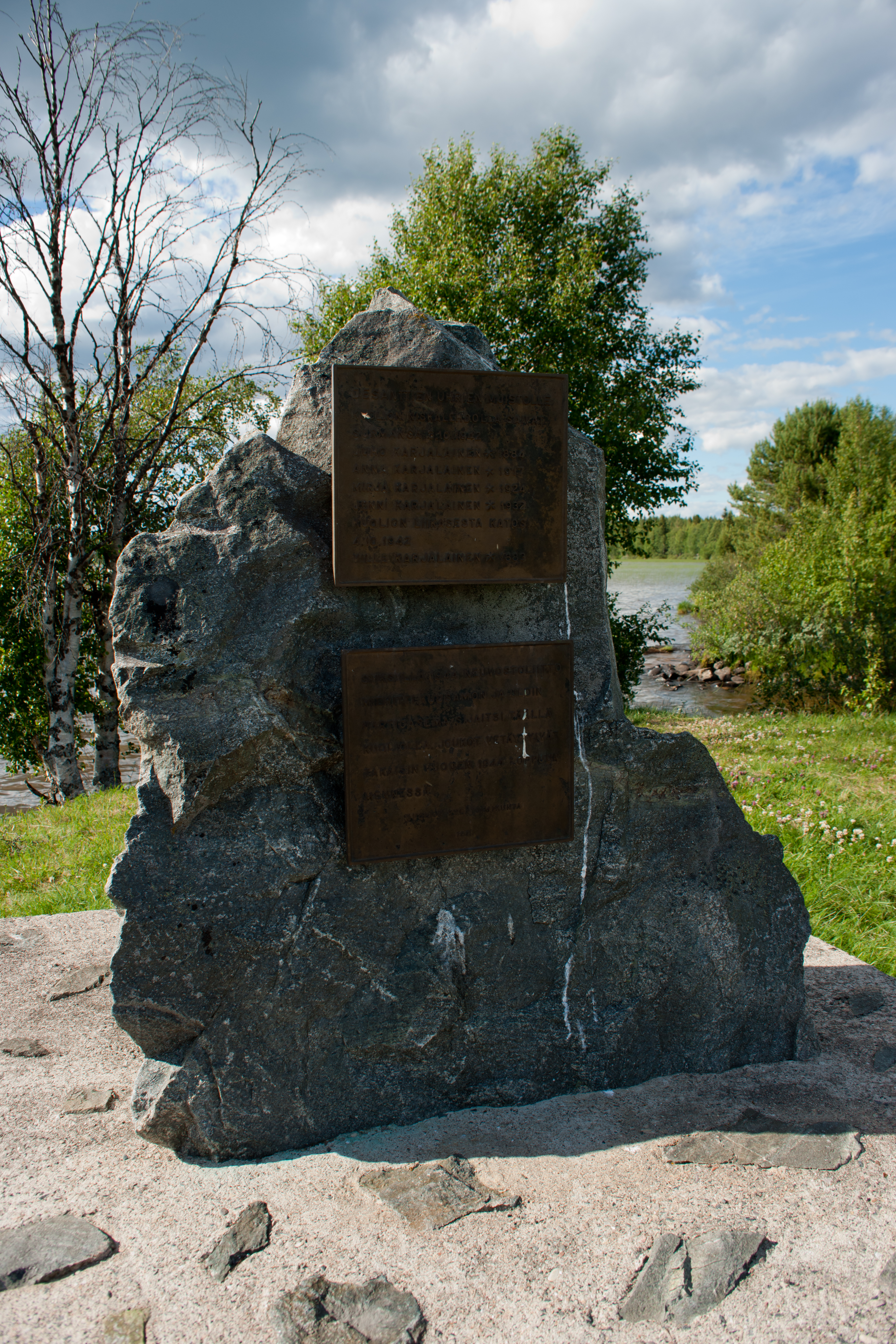
Memorial to civilians killed in the Second World War

After the independence of Finland in 1917, the Russian border was closed and so Kuusamo was cut off from its hinterland. The forestry sector suffered as no wood could be rafted from Kuusamo to the ports on the White Sea. Even the reindeer economy suffered as some of the herds remained on the Russian side of the border. Therefore, between the wars agriculture developed as the most important part of the economy. By 1925 the population had risen to 14,634, but it fell by around 2000 the next year through the detachment of the villages and Posio Suolijärvi Kuusamo.

At the start of the Winter War Kuusamo was evacuated in December 1939 for fear of a Soviet invasion. In the Moscow Peace Treaty, the Winter War ended on 14 March 1940, Finland lost large parts of Karelia, the eastern areas of Salla and Kuusamo to the Soviet Union. The ceded part of Kuusamo had an area of 1653 square kilometers and included the villages Paanajärvi, Tavajärvi, Vatajärvi, Enojärvi, Pukari and Kenttikylä. Its 2100 residents were relocated to other parts of Kuusamo. During the Continuation War of 1941-1944 Kuusamo was used as a supply depot by German and Finnish troops. The Germans built the Hyrynsalmi-Kuusamo Line to move troops and supplies from Hyrynsalmi. When it appeared that Germany might lose the war, Finland secretly negotiated a separate peace with the Soviet Union. After news of the armistice, the civilian population once again abandoned the town for fear of Russian occupation. The Russians did briefly occupy Kuusamo and burned the village to the ground upon their departure. One of the requirements on the treaty was the removal of any and all German troops currently on Finnish soil, which escalated into a minor separate war commonly known as the Lapland War between the Finns and the Germans.

In the years between 1945 and 1952 Kuusamo was rebuilt. By the late 1960s, the population had grown to almost 21,000. As agriculture in the village could not offer enough jobs for the baby boomer generation, the population began to decline rapidly. In 1954, the first ski run on the Rukatunturi was created. Through the expansion of the Ruka ski center, Kuusamo became a tourist center. In 2000, the municipality of Kuusamo was made a town.

== Geography ==
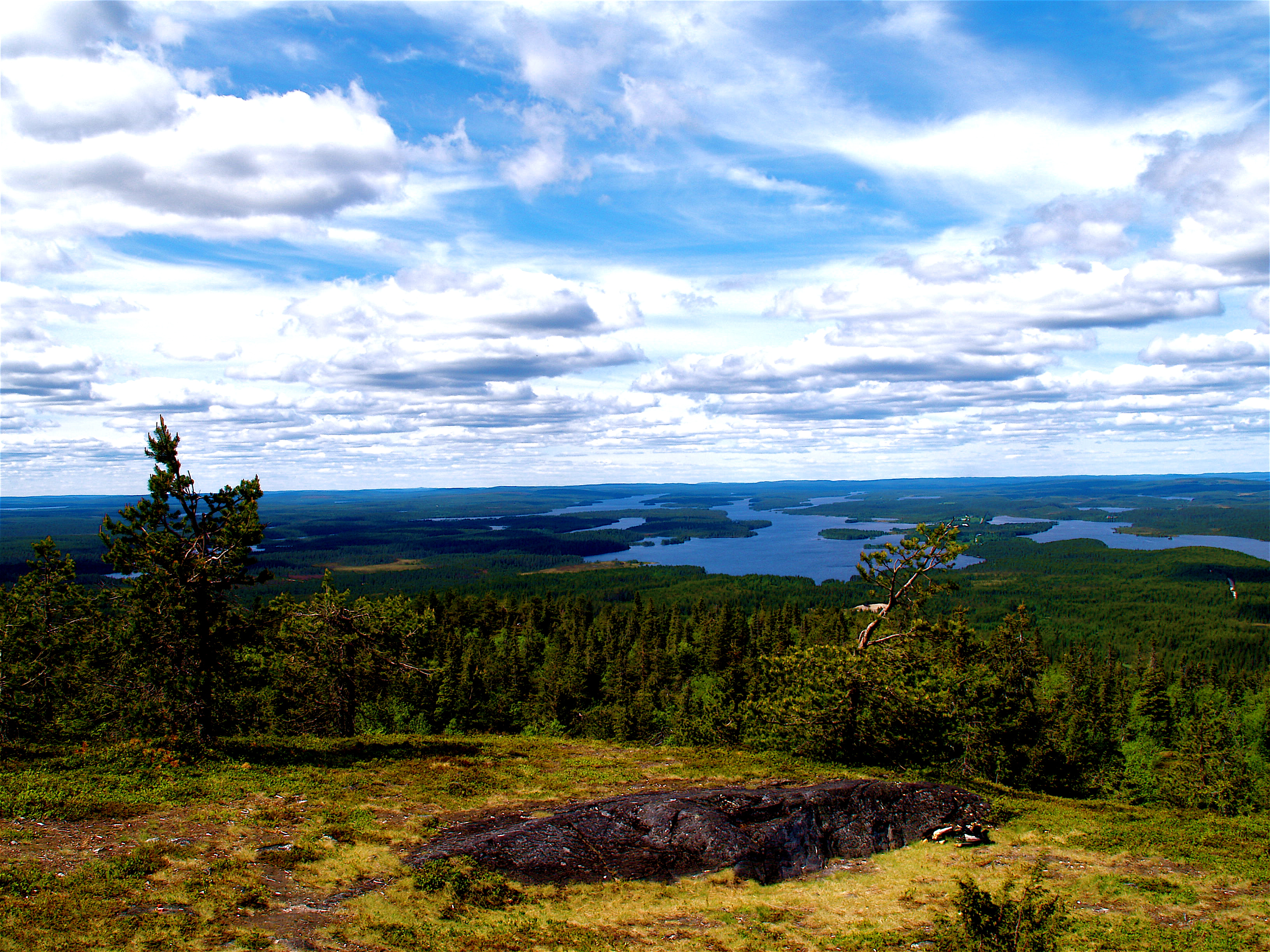

Kuusamo lies in the east of Finland in the Northern Ostrobothnia region on the border with Russia. The town of Kuusamo is only a small part of the municipality. The neighboring municipalities of Kuusamo are Suomussalmi in the south, Taivalkoski and Posio in the west, Salla in the north and Russia in the east. The nearest large towns are Rovaniemi, 192 kilometres (119 mi) northwest, Oulu 215 km (134 mi) southwest, and Kajaani 247 km (153 mi) south. The distance to the capital Helsinki is 796 km (495 mi).

Kuusamo covers an area of 5,808.92 square kilometres (2,242.84 sq mi) of which 830.81 km^{2} (320.78 sq mi) is water. The community center of Kuusamo, where nearly two-thirds of the population live, is only a small part of the territory. The rest of the municipality consists of sparsely populated, mostly wooded areas. Therefore, the population density of Kuusamo is only 2.97 inhabitants per square kilometre (7.7/sq mi). Apart from the city, villages include Alakitka, Heikkilä, Hiltunen, Irni, Jokilampi, Kallunki, Kantokylä, Kemilä, Kero, Kesäniemi, Kiitämäjärvi, Koskenkylä, Kuolio, Kurvinen, Kärpänkylä, Käylä, Lämsänkylä, Maaselänkylä, Murtovaara, Poussu, Puutteenkylä, Rukajärvi, Määttälänvaara, Soivio, Suorajärvi, Tammela, Teeriranta, Törmäsenvaara, Vasaraperä, Virrankylä, Vuotunki, Lehto and Kiviperä.

=== Landscape and nature ===
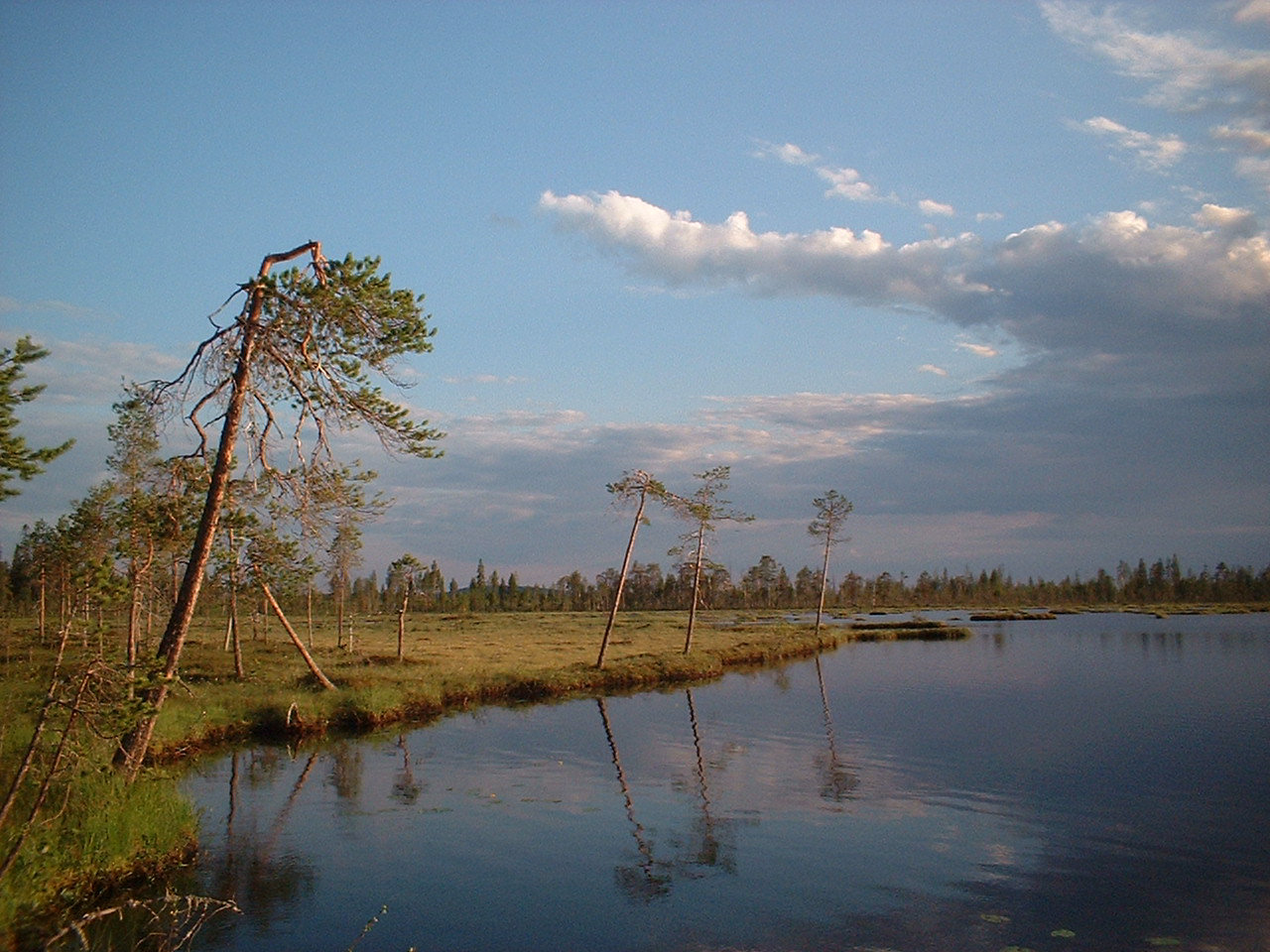
Marshland near Liikasenvaara

The city lies on a roughly 250-meter-high plateau, from which the waters flow in five directions. In the area of Kuusamo there are many hills (Finn. vaara) and fells (Finn. tunturi). The highest elevations are Valtavaara (492 m), Kuntivaara (481 m), Iivaara (469 m) and Rukatunturi (492 m), the site of the Ruka ski center.

Ninety percent of the land area is forested. The forests consist mainly of pine trees (70%) with some spruce (20%) and deciduous trees (10%). 801 km^{2} (309 sq mi) or 14% of the area of Kuusamo is covered by water. The largest of the 166 lakes in the area are Joukamojärvi, Kiitämä, Kitka, Kurkijärvi, Kuusamojärvi, Muojärvi and Suininki. Rivers in the area include Oulankajoki, Kitkajoki, Kuusinkijoki and Pistojoki flowing eastward to the White Sea and Iijoki westward to the Gulf of Bothnia.

The 270 km^{2} (100 sq mi) area of Oulanka National Park is shared between northern Kuusamo and neighboring Salla municipality. The landscape is dominated by pine forests, Oulankajoki river and its side branches with their sandbanks and rapids, and in the northern part vast marsh areas. In the wilderness live 30 species of mammals and 120 species of birds, including brown, stone and white-tailed eagle. Wolves and lynxes are rare. Rapids in Oulankajoki include Kiutaköngäs, Taivalköngäs, Jyrävä, Niskakoski, and Myllykoski. Near the southern border with Suomussalmi is the canyon lake Julma Ölkky with cliffs up to 50 m (160 ft) high.

According to IQAir, Kuusamo's air quality is the cleanest in the world; small particulates are present in the air at only 0.2 μg/m^{3}.

=== Climate ===
The average annual temperature is 0.7 °C, annual precipitation 643 millimetres (25.3 in). The warmest month is July with an average temperature of +15.0 °C, coldest January with −11.5 °C. The coldest ever measured temperature was −48 °C in Kiutaköngäs. The warmest temperature ever measured is 32,5 °C in Välikangas. Kuusamo is one of the snowiest areas in Finland: the ground is snow-covered for about 200 days a year, from late October until mid-May, with a depth of 80–90 centimetres (31–35 in).

The center of Kuusamo is located approximately 60 km (37 mi) south of the Arctic Circle, so does not technically experience midnight sun or polar night play a major role, but does experience very long days (White nights) in the summer and sees very little direct sunlight around the winter solstice . From 14 to 29 June, Kuusamo has nearly midnight sun.

Climate data for Kuusamo Airport, (1991-2020 normals, extremes 1959–present)
Month	Jan	Feb	Mar	Apr	May	Jun	Jul	Aug	Sep	Oct	Nov	Dec	Year
Record high °C (°F)	6.1 (43.0)	5.8 (42.4)	9.8 (49.6)	16.6 (61.9)	26.8 (80.2)	29.9 (85.8)	31.3 (88.3)	29.4 (84.9)	22.1 (71.8)	15.2 (59.4)	9.1 (48.4)	6.2 (43.2)	31.3 (88.3)
Mean maximum °C (°F)	0.8 (33.4)	1.0 (33.8)	4.8 (40.6)	11.0 (51.8)	20.5 (68.9)	24.3 (75.7)	25.8 (78.4)	23.8 (74.8)	17.8 (64.0)	9.8 (49.6)	4.2 (39.6)	1.8 (35.2)	26.8 (80.2)
Mean daily maximum °C (°F)	−7.9 (17.8)	−7.5 (18.5)	−2.3 (27.9)	3.3 (37.9)	10.1 (50.2)	16.4 (61.5)	19.5 (67.1)	16.6 (61.9)	10.6 (51.1)	3.0 (37.4)	−2.3 (27.9)	−5.6 (21.9)	4.5 (40.1)
Daily mean °C (°F)	−11.5 (11.3)	−11.3 (11.7)	−6.9 (19.6)	−0.9 (30.4)	5.5 (41.9)	11.8 (53.2)	15.0 (59.0)	12.4 (54.3)	7.2 (45.0)	0.6 (33.1)	−4.8 (23.4)	−8.6 (16.5)	0.7 (33.3)
Mean daily minimum °C (°F)	−15.9 (3.4)	−15.8 (3.6)	−11.9 (10.6)	−5.8 (21.6)	0.7 (33.3)	7.0 (44.6)	10.5 (50.9)	8.3 (46.9)	3.9 (39.0)	−1.7 (28.9)	−7.7 (18.1)	−12.4 (9.7)	−3.4 (25.9)
Mean minimum °C (°F)	−32.8 (−27.0)	−31.3 (−24.3)	−27.2 (−17.0)	−19.0 (−2.2)	−7.0 (19.4)	0.1 (32.2)	3.6 (38.5)	1.2 (34.2)	−3.5 (25.7)	−12.6 (9.3)	−21.2 (−6.2)	−27.6 (−17.7)	−34.7 (−30.5)
Record low °C (°F)	−45.2 (−49.4)	−44.6 (−48.3)	−39.5 (−39.1)	−30.1 (−22.2)	−18.5 (−1.3)	−4.2 (24.4)	−0.9 (30.4)	−4.4 (24.1)	−10.2 (13.6)	−26.5 (−15.7)	−35.8 (−32.4)	−38.8 (−37.8)	−45.2 (−49.4)
Average precipitation mm (inches)	45 (1.8)	36 (1.4)	36 (1.4)	35 (1.4)	51 (2.0)	67 (2.6)	88 (3.5)	66 (2.6)	56 (2.2)	58 (2.3)	54 (2.1)	50 (2.0)	643 (25.3)
Average precipitation days	11	10	9	8	10	10	11	10	10	12	13	13	127
Average relative humidity (%)	87	86	80	73	69	66	72	79	84	89	92	90	81
Source 1: FMI
Source 2: FMI open data

Climate data for Kuusamo Kiutaköngäs, (1991-2020 normals, extremes 1966–present)
Month	Jan	Feb	Mar	Apr	May	Jun	Jul	Aug	Sep	Oct	Nov	Dec	Year
Record high °C (°F)	7.9 (46.2)	6.6 (43.9)	11.3 (52.3)	18.2 (64.8)	28.4 (83.1)	31.0 (87.8)	32.1 (89.8)	31.0 (87.8)	23.3 (73.9)	15.0 (59.0)	9.4 (48.9)	6.5 (43.7)	32.1 (89.8)
Mean maximum °C (°F)	1.4 (34.5)	1.7 (35.1)	6.0 (42.8)	12.7 (54.9)	21.3 (70.3)	25.5 (77.9)	26.9 (80.4)	25.0 (77.0)	18.9 (66.0)	10.3 (50.5)	4.7 (40.5)	2.4 (36.3)	27.9 (82.2)
Mean daily maximum °C (°F)	−8.5 (16.7)	−7.8 (18.0)	−1.3 (29.7)	4.7 (40.5)	11.0 (51.8)	17.3 (63.1)	20.5 (68.9)	17.6 (63.7)	11.6 (52.9)	3.5 (38.3)	−2.2 (28.0)	−5.8 (21.6)	5.1 (41.2)
Daily mean °C (°F)	−12.1 (10.2)	−11.8 (10.8)	−6.9 (19.6)	−0.5 (31.1)	5.7 (42.3)	12.0 (53.6)	15.1 (59.2)	12.3 (54.1)	7.2 (45.0)	0.8 (33.4)	−4.6 (23.7)	−8.8 (16.2)	0.7 (33.3)
Mean daily minimum °C (°F)	−18.1 (−0.6)	−17.8 (0.0)	−13.5 (7.7)	−6.3 (20.7)	0.1 (32.2)	6.1 (43.0)	9.7 (49.5)	7.6 (45.7)	3.1 (37.6)	−2.1 (28.2)	−8.4 (16.9)	−13.6 (7.5)	−4.4 (24.1)
Mean minimum °C (°F)	−35.7 (−32.3)	−35.4 (−31.7)	−29.8 (−21.6)	−20.6 (−5.1)	−7.2 (19.0)	−1.1 (30.0)	2.6 (36.7)	−0.1 (31.8)	−4.4 (24.1)	−14.5 (5.9)	−23.2 (−9.8)	−30.7 (−23.3)	−37.9 (−36.2)
Record low °C (°F)	−48.0 (−54.4)	−44.4 (−47.9)	−42.2 (−44.0)	−32.4 (−26.3)	−17.8 (0.0)	−4.3 (24.3)	−2.4 (27.7)	−4.9 (23.2)	−11.0 (12.2)	−28.5 (−19.3)	−39.7 (−39.5)	−45.0 (−49.0)	−48.0 (−54.4)
Average precipitation mm (inches)	34 (1.3)	27 (1.1)	29 (1.1)	30 (1.2)	46 (1.8)	63 (2.5)	82 (3.2)	63 (2.5)	55 (2.2)	51 (2.0)	42 (1.7)	39 (1.5)	560 (22.0)
Average precipitation days	9	8	8	8	10	10	11	10	10	11	11	11	117
Source 1: https://helda.helsinki.fi/items/d7ce3a4f-bf47-4453-be76-2a0de738c59a
Source 2: https://kilotavu.com/asema-taulukko.php?asema=101887

== Population ==
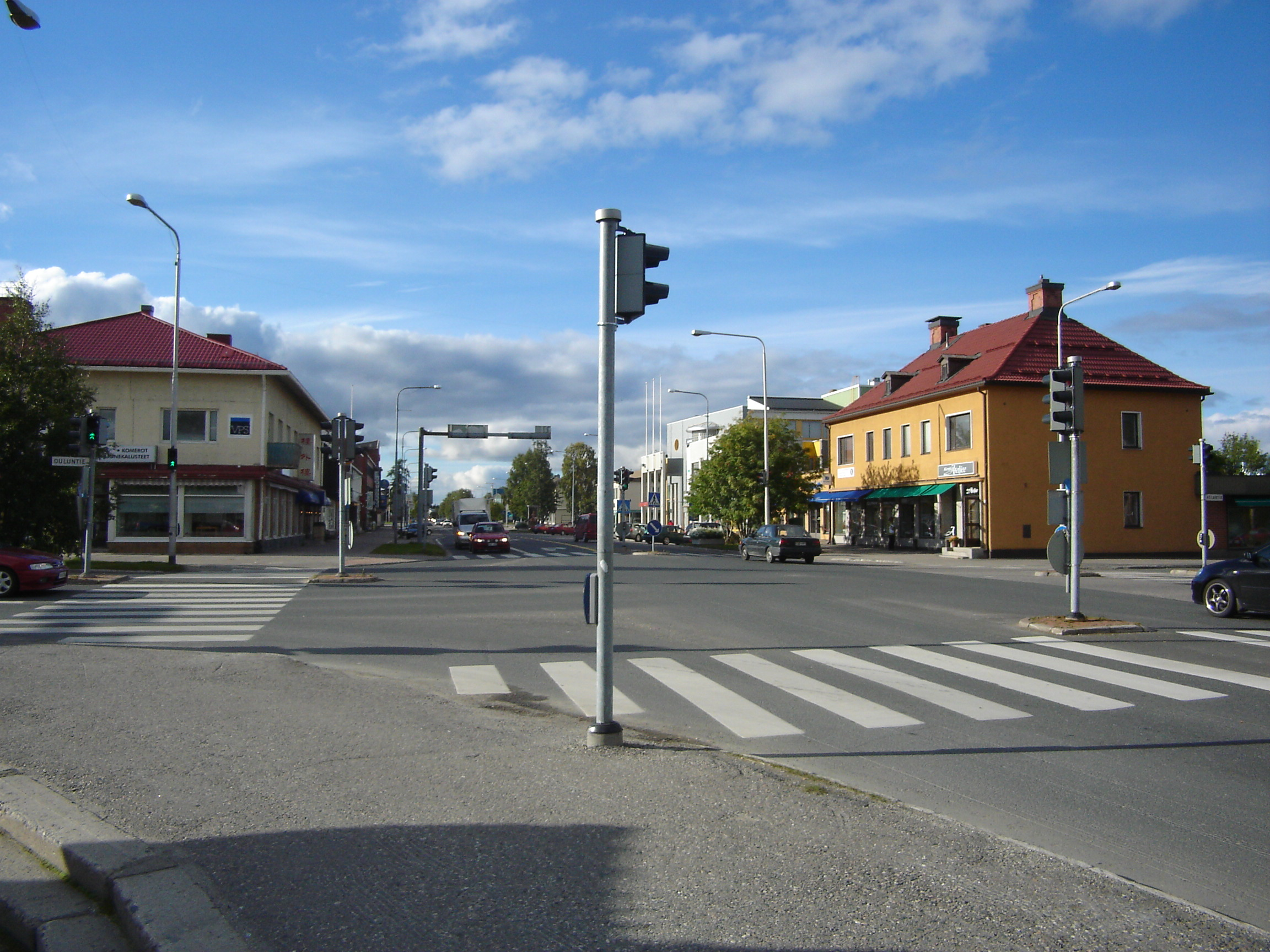
The Kuusamo centre

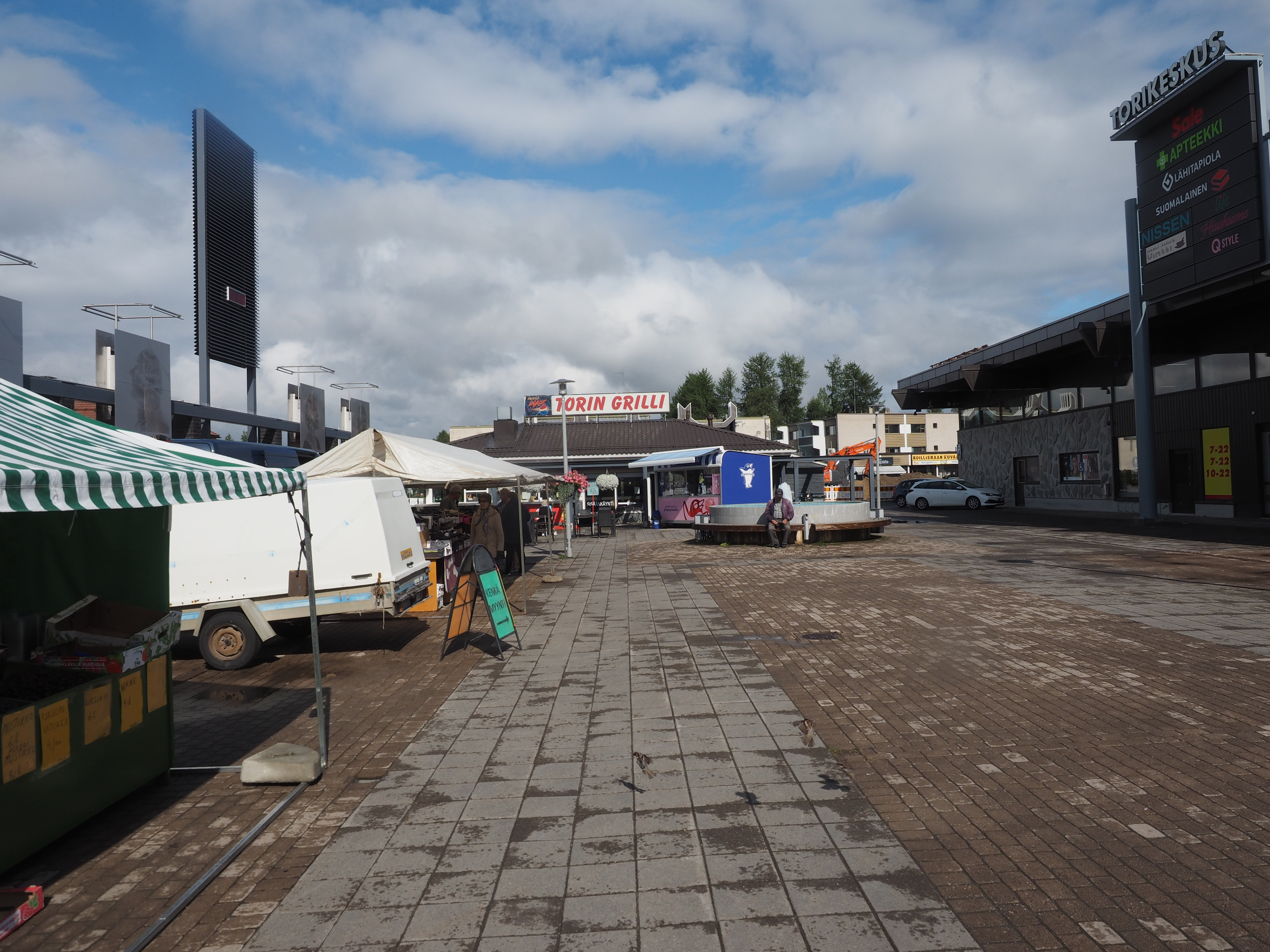
Kuusamo Market Square

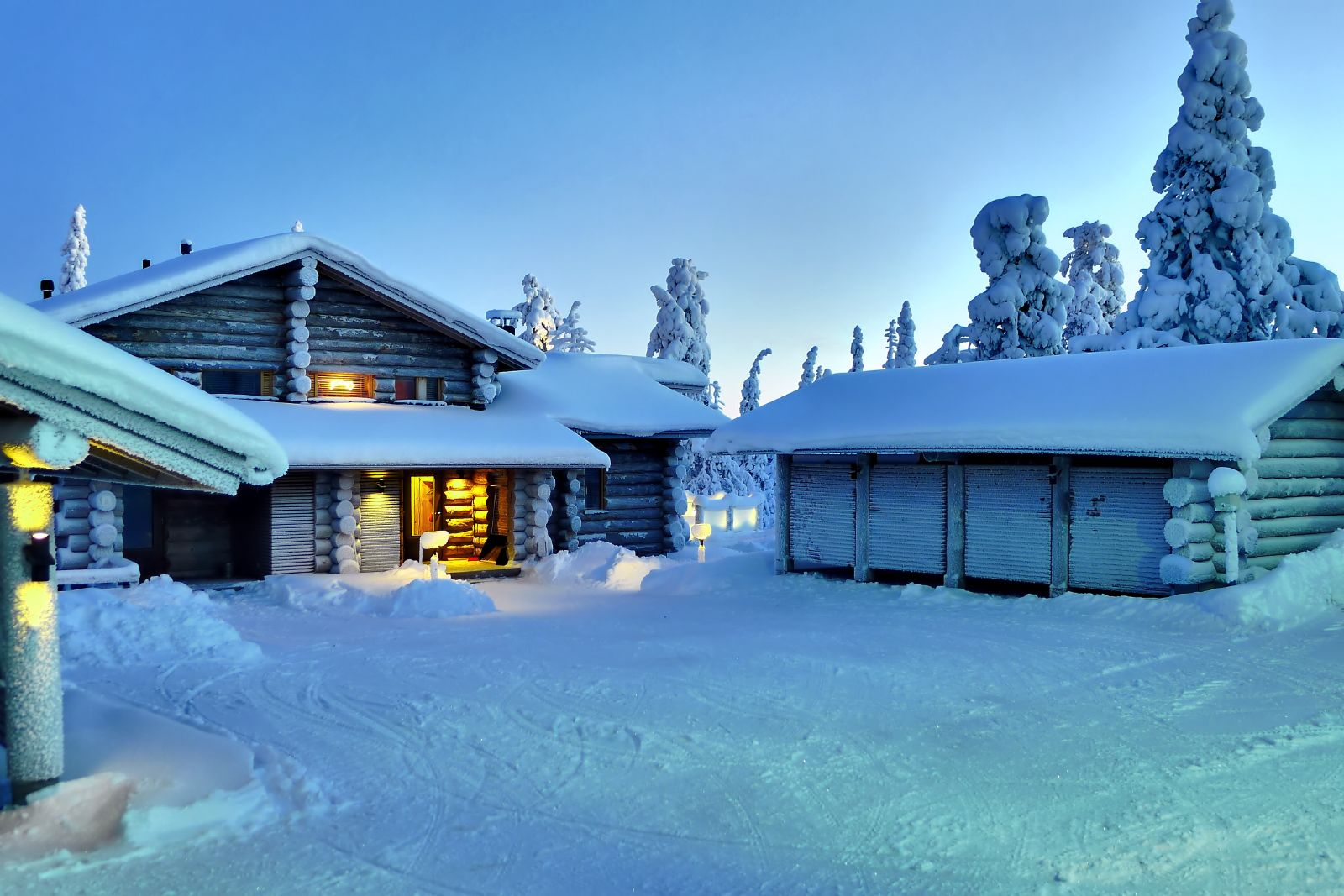
A cottage at the Rukatunturi fell

On 31 December 2025 Kuusamo had 14,800 inhabitants. Nearly two-thirds of the population lives in the city center, called the village of Kuusamo, the rest is divided among the villages in the rural hinterland. Like most communities in the Northern and Eastern Finland, there has been marked migration to larger urban areas. The population peaked in the late 1960s at nearly 21,000 residents. With the exception of a period in the 1990s, the population has steadily declined since then.

The migration has had an effect on Kuusamo's age structure, as it is mainly young people who leave the town. For example, between 1998 and 2001, the percentage of people aged less than 15 years fell from 25% to 23%, while the share of those aged over 64 years rose from 12 to 14%.

Year	Population
1960	18,639
1965	20,795
1970	19,974
1980	18,161
1985	17,923
1990	18,061
1995	18,687
2000	17,891
2001	17,729
2003	17,405
2005	17,113
2008	16,779

== Economy ==
The main economic activities in Kuusamo include forestry, reindeer husbandry, small industries and tourism. The unemployment rate, at 16.2% (2003) is relatively high.

In 2002 there were 248 farms in Kuusamo. Given the climatic conditions, milk and meat production have a major role, including reindeer meat from the approximately 10,000 semi-domesticated reindeer which roam the pastures in Kuusamo. The forestry and wood processing industry also employs over 1,000 people.

=== Tourism ===
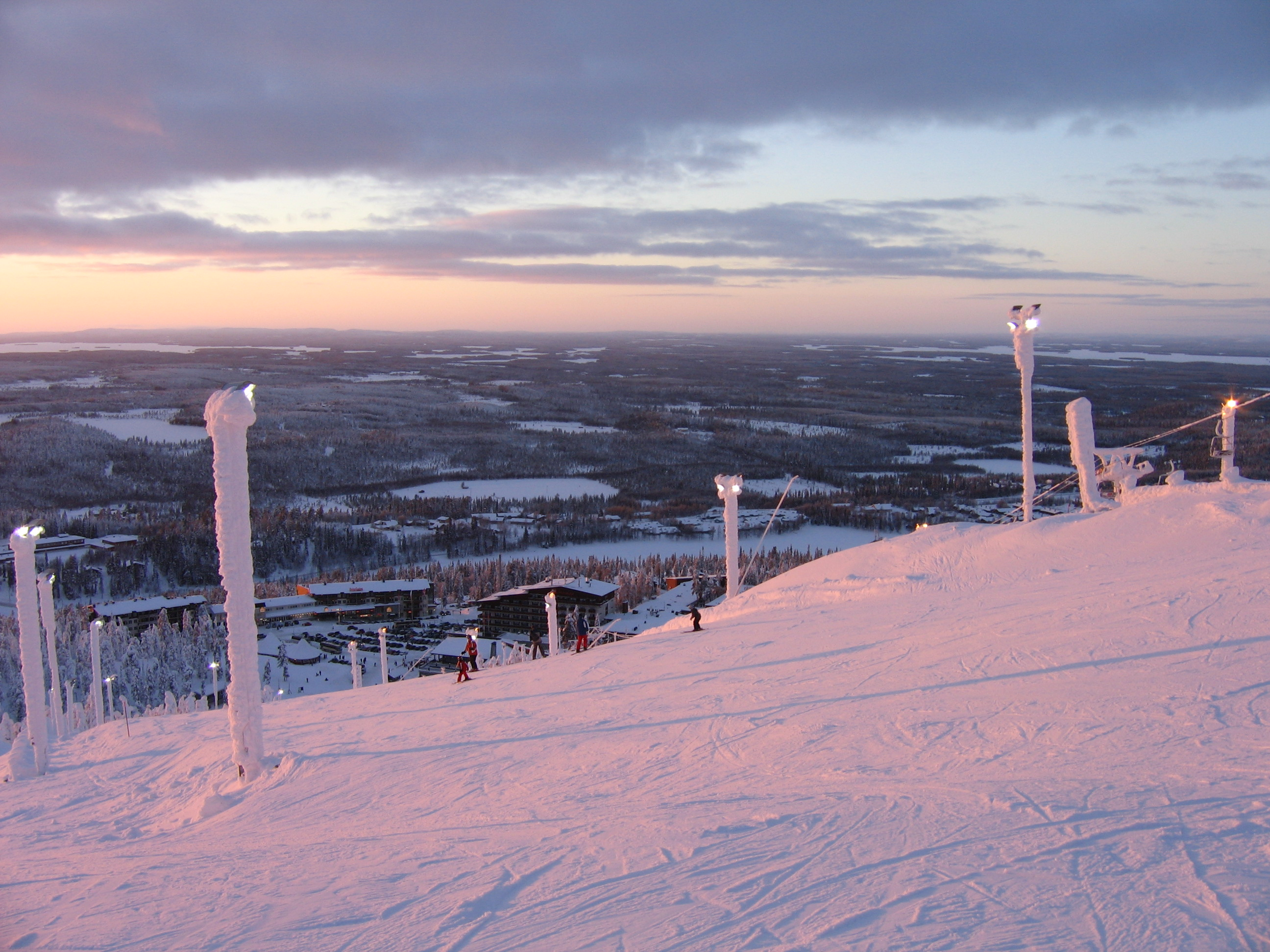
Ruka in winter

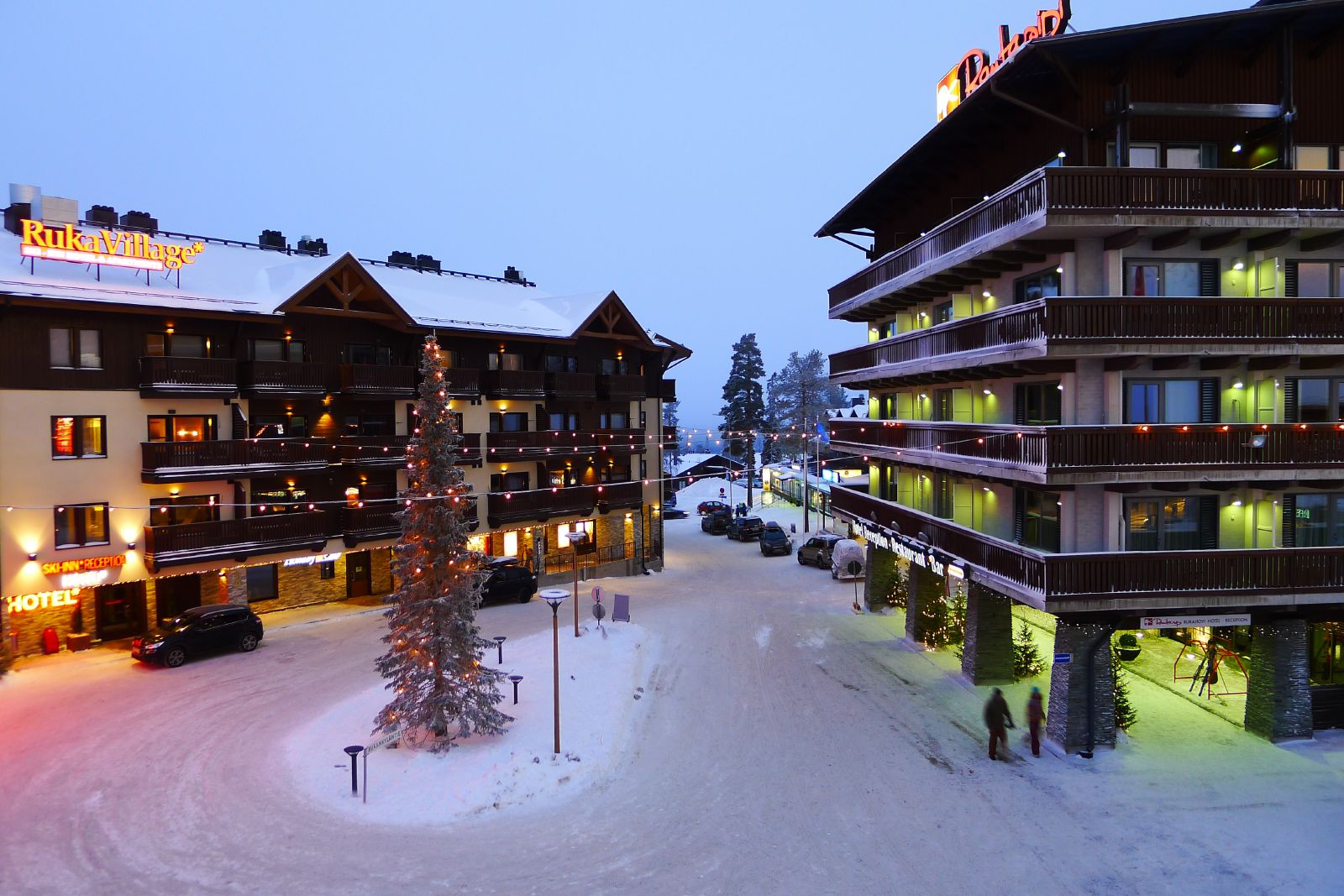
The Ruka village

Around one million tourists visit Kuusamo annually. During 2024 there were 545 000 registered overnights, of which 390 000 were Finnish (72 %) and 155 000 (28 %) foreigners. Un-registered overnights 2024: 491 000. These numbers do not include overnights in privately owned cottages. There are around 7,500 cottages (mökki) in Kuusamo, more than any other municipality in Finland.

Tourism income in Kuusamo on 2024 was 149 MEur (18 % of the total turnover across all industries). Tourism provided year-round employment for 649 residents of Kuusamo in 2024 (17,1 % of the total full-time equivalent jobs in the region).

The Ruka ski center, centered on the 492-metre Rukatunturi, is one of the largest in Finland with a total of 12,000 beds, five hotels and 28 restaurants. Activities include skiing, snowmobile tours and excursions with reindeer and dog sleds. Ruka benefits from a long snowy season, from October to May, and snow-how in snow making.

In summer, Kuusamo is a popular wilderness destination for fishing, kayaking and hiking. The most popular hiking trail is Bear's Ring (Karhunkierros), which runs for 80 km (50 mi), mostly in the Oulanka National Park.

== Transportation ==
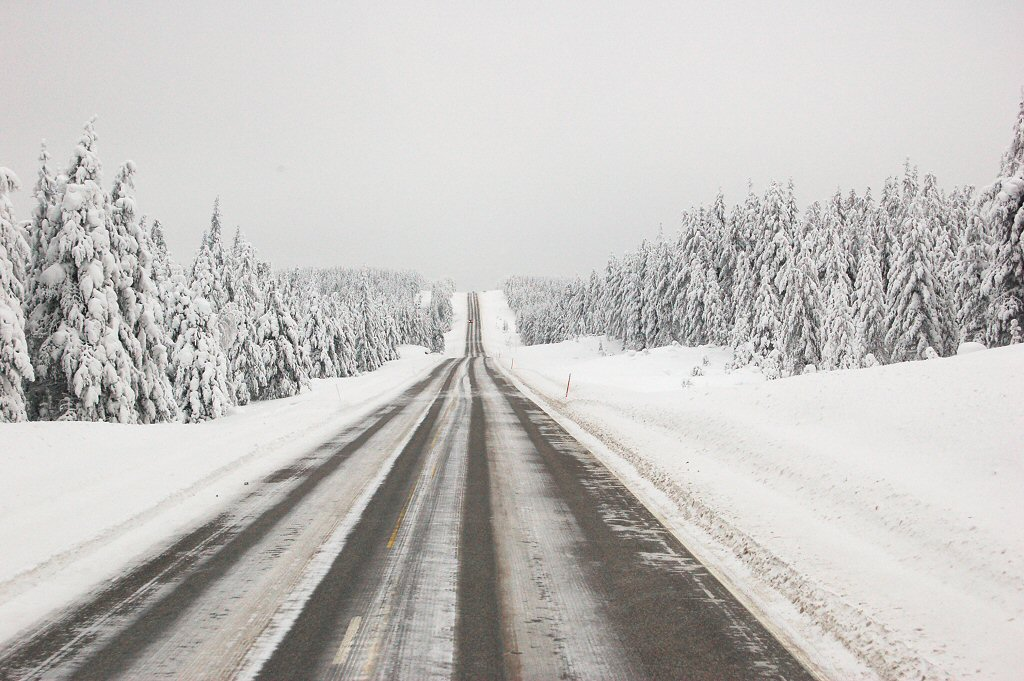
National road 20 in Kuusamo

National highway 5 (E63) connects Kuusamo to Southern Finland. Highway 20 leads from Kuusamo to Oulu, and the main road 81 to Rovaniemi. In Suoperä at Kuusamo, there is a border crossing to Russia, opened for international traffic in 2006. In 2007, 17,000 border crossings recorded.

Kuusamo Airport is 6 km (4 mi) from the city center and 27 km (17 mi) from Ruka. It was opened in 1969 and has since been expanded several times. The airline Finnair offers daily direct flights from Helsinki, adding charter flights during the tourist season. Seasonal flights are offered by Lufthansa from Frankfurt, Edelweiss Air from Zürich and Eurowings from Düsseldorf. In 2024, 129,373 passengers used the airport.

== Culture and attractions ==
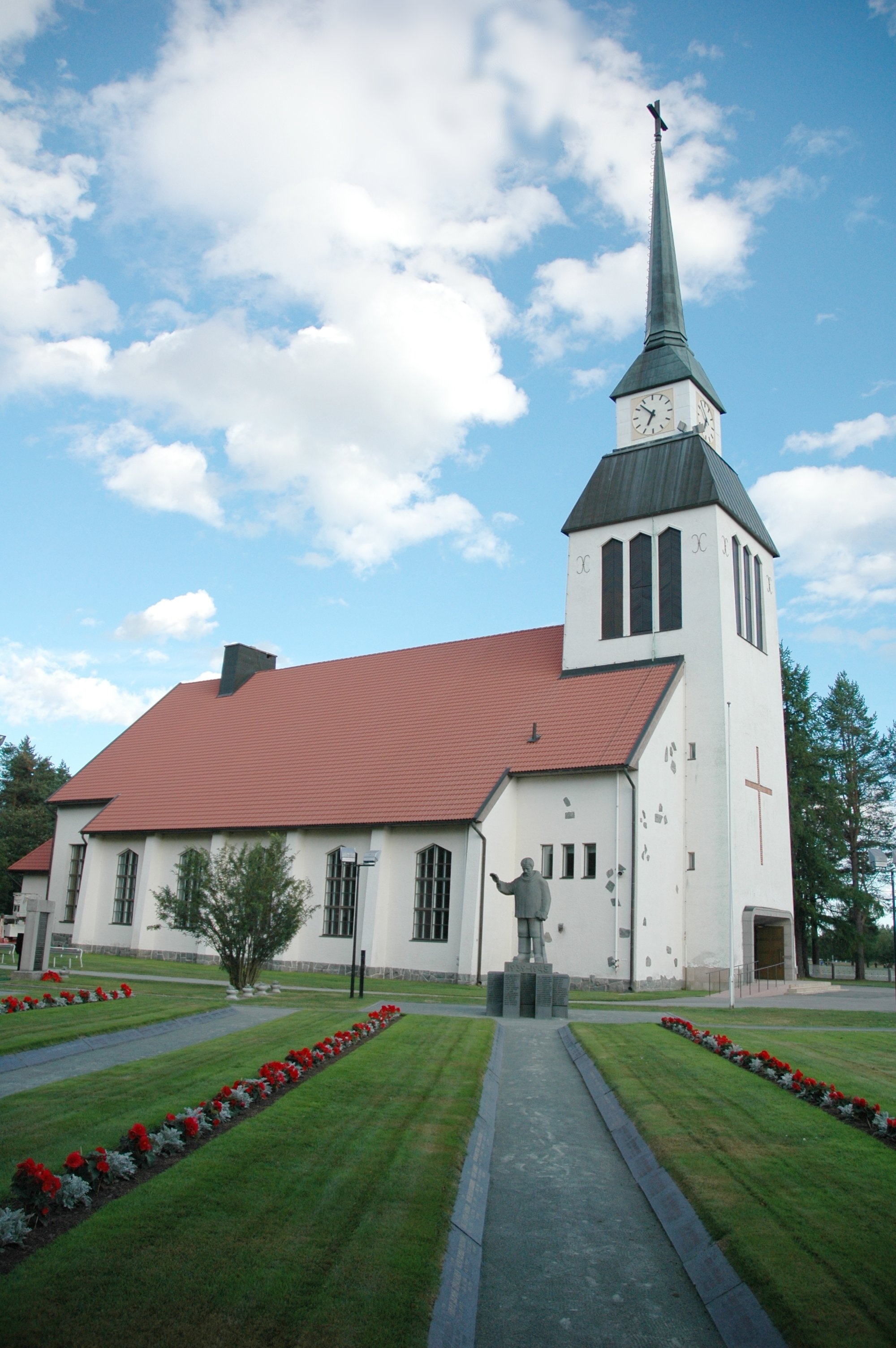
The Church of Kuusamo

While Kuusamo mainly attracts visitors because of its natural environment, the city has produced little of interest in the traditional sense. Because the city center was completely destroyed in the Lapland War and then had to be rebuilt quickly and economically, Kuusamo is seen as largely uninteresting from an architectural point of view. In contrast - at least considering the small population - the cultural life of the city is relatively lively.

The Kuusamo Hall in the town center, completed in 1996, acts as a convention and cultural center. In it one can find regular musical and theatrical performances as well as changing art exhibitions. The Kuusamo Local History Museum is an outdoor museum that has been established on a historic farm. Additionally, a school museum is set up in the old school of Kirkkoketo.

The church in the center of Kuusamo was built in 1951. It stands on the site of the old wooden church from 1802, which was burnt down in 1944 Lapland War by German troops. At that time German soldiers buried the two church bells (one endowed to the church by Charles XI of Sweden in 1698, and the other originating from the year 1721) in the cemetery to secure them from the advancing Soviet troops. The bells were considered lost until 1959, when the former German regimental commander visited Kuusamo and revealed the location of the buried bells. Today these same bells are housed in the rebuilt church.

== Sports ==
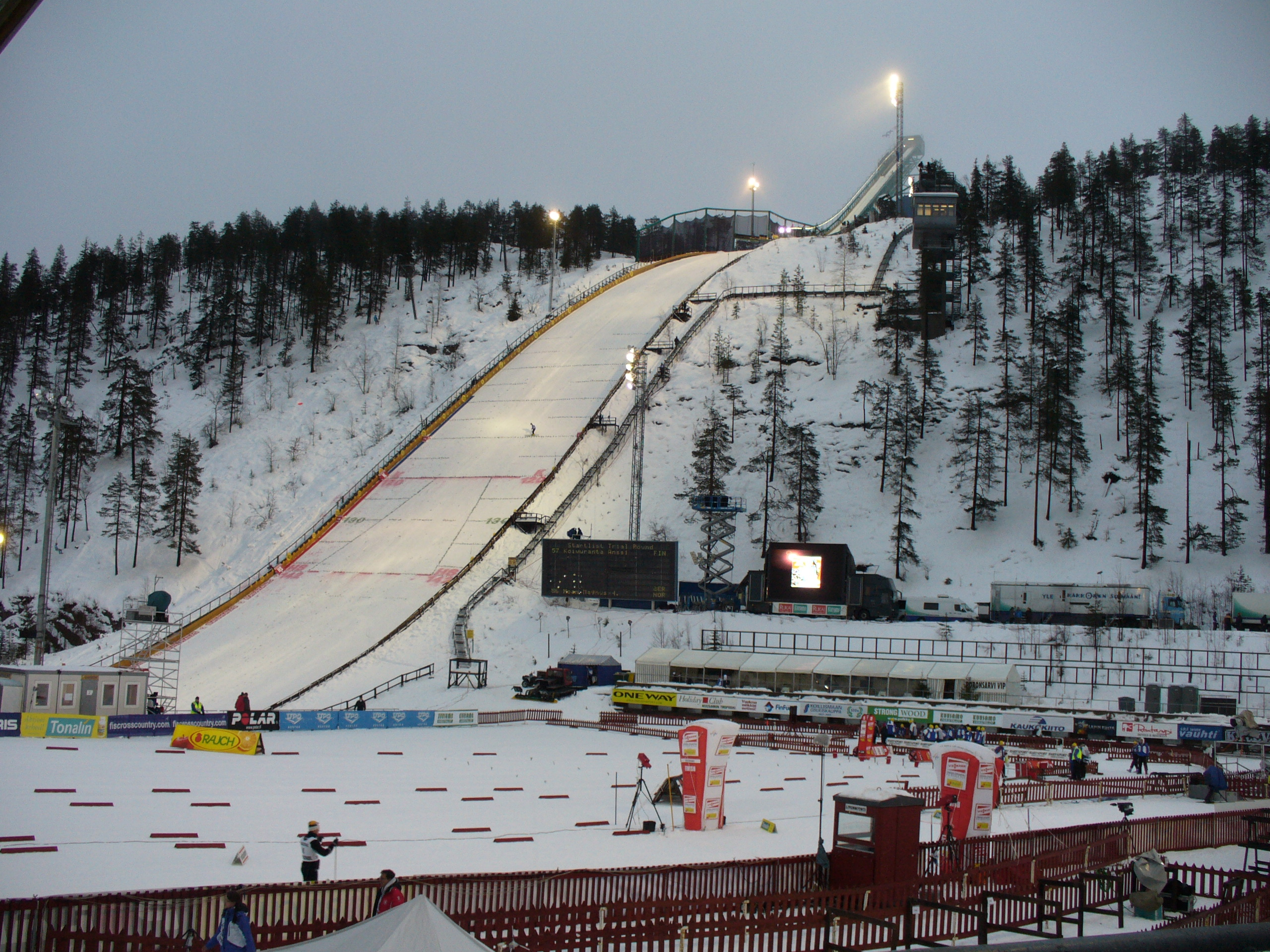
Rukatunturi ski jumping hill

Kuusamo is the venue of several international winter sports competitions. In Ruka skiing there is a stadium with the Rukatunturi-hill (HS142) and a smaller-K64 ski jumping hill and lighted trails and a biathlon facility. Since 2002, the World Cup kick-off in ski jumping and Nordic combined and cross country skiing World Cup races in Ruka Nordic Opening in late November at a joint event in Kuusamo. In 2024 Ruka Nordic hosted nearly 30,000 spectators.

== International relations ==
=== Twin towns—Sister cities ===
Kuusamo is twinned with:

- Hørning Municipality, Denmark
- Avesta Municipality, Sweden
- Askøy Municipality, Norway
- Loukhsky District, Russia

== Notable people ==
- Alexander Kuoppala, former Children Of Bodom guitarist
- Enni Rukajärvi, slopestyle snowboarder and 2014 Winter Olympics silver medalist
- Karoliina Honkala, Finnish chemist
- Anssi Koivuranta, ski-jumper, former Nordic combined athlete
- Pirkko Määttä, cross-country skier
- Jarkko Oikarinen, developer of IRC
- Kalevi Oikarainen, cross-country skier
- Veikko Törmänen, visual artist
- Meeri Koutaniemi, photographer
