= Kuusamo Airport =

Airport in Kuusamo, Finland

Kuusamo Airport Kuusamon lentoasema

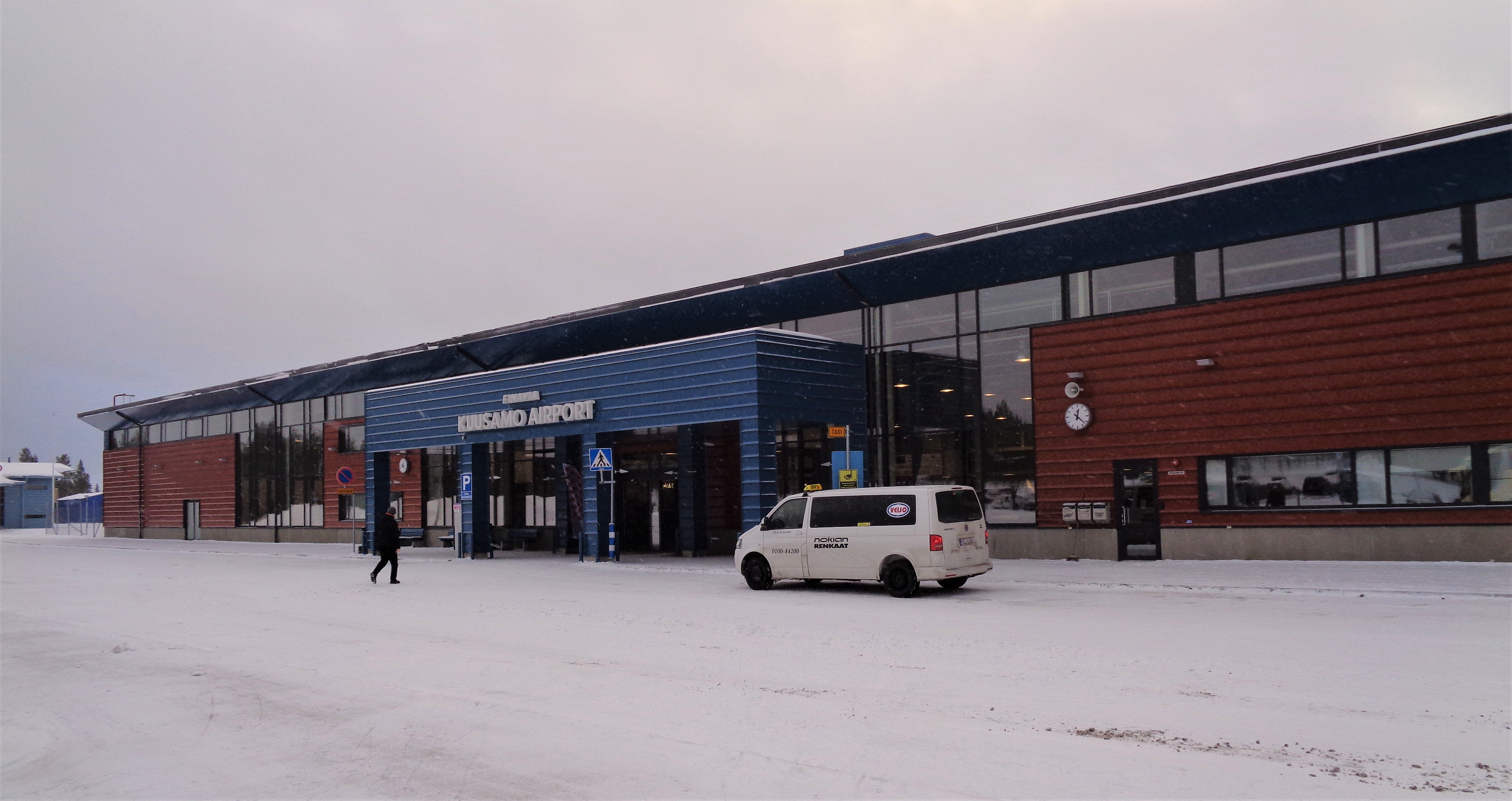
- IATA: KAO; ICAO: EFKS

Summary
- Airport type: Public
- Operator: Finavia
- Serves: Kuusamo, Finland
- Elevation AMSL: 866 ft (264 m)
- Coordinates: 65°59′25″N 029°13′55″E
- Website: www.finavia.fi/en/airports/kuusamo

Map
- Location within Finland

Runways
Direction	Length		Surface
Direction	m	ft	Surface
12/30	2,460	8,071	Asphalt

Statistics (2025)
- Passengers: 129,373
- Landings: 955
- Source: AIP Finland

Kuusamo Airport (IATA: KAO, ICAO: EFKS) is an airport in Kuusamo, Finland. It is located 6 kilometres (4 mi) northeast of Kuusamo's town centre.

== Airlines and destinations ==
The following airlines operate regular scheduled and charter flights at Kuusamo Airport:

Airlines	Destinations
airBaltic	Seasonal: Berlin (begins 12 December 2026), Hamburg (begins 12 December 2026), London–Gatwick (begins 13 December 2026), Manchester (begins 13 December 2026), Riga (begins 11 December 2026)
Edelweiss Air	Seasonal: Zürich
Eurowings	Seasonal: Berlin (begins 20 December 2026), Düsseldorf
Finnair	Helsinki
Jet2.com	Seasonal charter: Manchester
Lufthansa	Seasonal: Frankfurt
Transavia	Seasonal: Rotterdam
TUI Airways	Seasonal: Birmingham, London–Gatwick, Manchester
TUI fly Netherlands	Seasonal: Rotterdam

== Statistics ==
Annual passenger statistics for Kuusamo Airport
Year	Domestic passengers	International passengers	Total passengers	Change
2005	87,802	13,476	101,278	−0.6% ▼
2006	87,366	23,680	111,046	+9.6% ▲
2007	84,279	24,115	108,394	−2.3% ▼
2008	78,738	24,192	102,930	−4.8% ▼
2009	75,136	18,947	94,083	−8.6% ▼
2010	68,953	13,544	82,497	−12.3% ▼
2011	81,283	10,476	91,759	+11.2% ▲
2012	75,521	10,965	86,486	−5.7% ▼
2013	62,415	12,168	74,583	−13.8% ▼
2014	62,789	10,643	73,432	−1.5% ▼
2015	57,478	11,427	68,905	−6.2% ▼
2016	62,902	13,946	76,848	+11.5% ▲
2017	67,183	20,569	87,752	+14.2% ▲
2018	79,515	34,054	113,569	+29.4% ▲
2019	78,103	35,890	113,993	+0.4% ▲
2020	47,689	23,254	70,943	−37.8% ▼
2021	53,315	20,894	74,209	+4.6% ▲
2022	67,754	49,350	117,104	+57.8% ▲
2023	63,874	56,677	120,551	+2.9% ▲
2024	62,318	63,995	126,313	+4.8% ▲
2025	60,707	68,666	129,373	+2.4% ▲

== See also ==
- List of the largest airports in the Nordic countries
