= Sinikka Laine =

Finnish writer

- Born: 17 October 1945 (age 80); Riihimäki, Finland
- Occupations: Author, Novelist

Sinikka Laine-Törmänen (born 17 October 1945) is a Finnish author primarily of young adult fiction. Her first novel Ohari was published in 1982.

Laine has won many literary awards and her novel Tyttö tuulesta, poika pimeästä (1986) won the Finnish state literature award (Finnish: Valtion kirjallisuuspalkinto).

Laine was born in Riihimäki, but lives and works in Oulu. She is married to artist Veikko Törmänen.

== Works ==
=== Novels ===
- Ohari, WSOY 1982. ISBN 951-0-11369-7
- Ei kenenkään, ei koskaan, WSOY 1984. ISBN 951-0-12189-4
- Tyttö tuulesta, poika pimeästä, WSOY 1986. ISBN 951-0-13861-4
- Silkkiuikku, WSOY 1988 (as Danish translation: Sommerpigen, 1990) ISBN 951-0-15266-8 (Danish translation: ISBN 87-00-69234-4)
- Sininen ruoho, WSOY 1990, ISBN 951-0-16616-2
- Jos et pelkää pimeää, WSOY 1991. ISBN 951-0-17070-4
- Töyhtö, WSOY 1992. ISBN 951-0-18245-1
- Myrtti, yhden talven tyttö, WSOY 1994. ISBN 951-0-19020-9
- Kuujuhla, WSOY 1995. ISBN 951-0-20404-8
- Hyvästi, valkoinen, WSOY 1996. ISBN 951-0-20654-7

=== Short stories ===
- Sata munkkipossua in Sanojen portille lyhyesti (Edited by Asko Martinheimo), WSOY 1986
- Taiteilijaelämää, Kaltio 4 / 2003
