= Kärpänkylä =

Village in Kuusamo, Finland

Coordinates: 65°56′N 029°48′E

Kärpänkylä is a village in Kuusamo, Finland.
