= 2012–13 Polish ski jumping team =

Polish ski jumping team's performance in the 2012–13 season

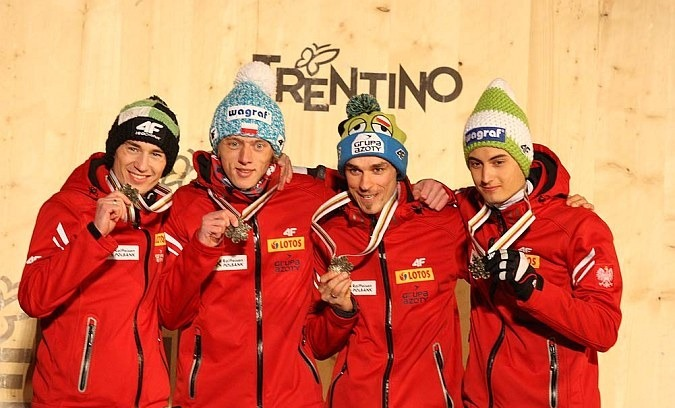
Poles with bronze medals at the World Ski Championships

Polish national ski jumping team in the 2012–13 season represented Poland in international ski jumping competitions during the 2012 summer season and the 2012–13 winter season.

In the Summer Grand Prix, the team took 4th place in the team classification, and Polish ski jumpers reached the podium three times (these were Maciej Kot and Dawid Kubacki). In the top 10 of the general classification were Kot (5th) and Kubacki (8th). In the Summer Continental Cup, Poles finished on the podium three times, and Kubacki was ranked 8th in the general classification.

In the World Cup, Polish athletes achieved seven podium finishes in individual competitions (including three victories – two by Kamil Stoch and one by Piotr Żyła) and two podiums in team competitions. In the Nations Cup general classification, Poland was 5th, and the highest-ranked individual athlete was Stoch, who finished 3rd. 10 Polish representatives scored points, setting a national record in the World Cup. Of these, three were ranked in the top 20. Meanwhile, two of them were among the top 10 ski flyers of the season.

The team won two medals at the World Ski Championships in Predazzo – a gold in the individual large hill competition, won by Kamil Stoch, and a bronze in the men's team competition.

In the Continental Cup, Polish representatives placed in the top 3 eight times, achieved by Klemens Murańka, Jan Ziobro, Stefan Hula, and Krzysztof Biegun.

== Team Composition ==
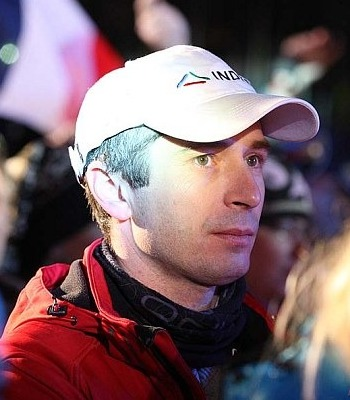
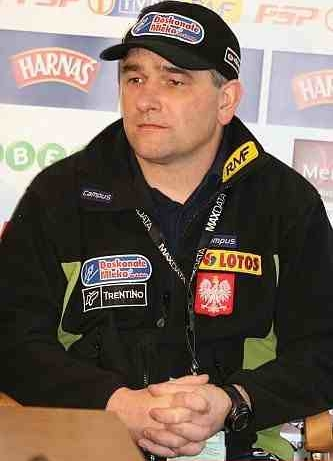
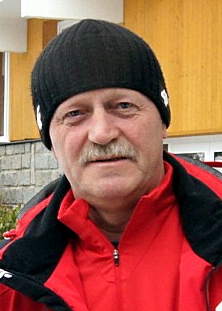
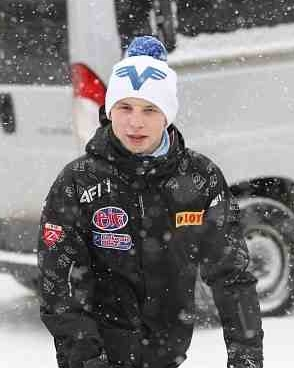
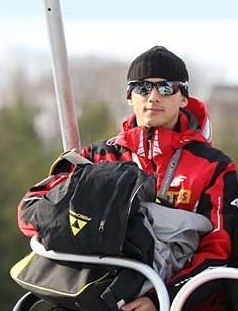
Coaches of the A team: Łukasz Kruczek, Zbigniew Klimowski, and Piotr Fijas, along with service technician Kacper Skrobot and physiotherapist Łukasz Gębala

On 24 April 2012, the team was divided into two squads: the Olympic (A) team and the youth (B) team, further split into five smaller groups with assigned coaches.

The first group of the A team included Kamil Stoch, Piotr Żyła, Maciej Kot, and Krzysztof Miętus, coached by Łukasz Kruczek. The second group, under Zbigniew Klimowski, comprised Stefan Hula and Dawid Kubacki. The third group, trained by Piotr Fijas in Poland, included Jan Ziobro, Andrzej Zapotoczny, Jakub Kot, and Łukasz Rutkowski. Additionally, Grzegorz Sobczyk served as Kruczek's assistant, Łukasz Gębala as physiotherapist, and Kacper Skrobot as serviceman. Other staff included physician Aleksander Winiarski, biomechanist Piotr Krężałek, psychologist Kamil Wódka, motor skills consultant Michał Wilk, and coach Jan Szturc.

Kruczek noted that despite the new subgroup system, training would follow a similar approach to previous seasons.

The first youth team group, coached by Robert Mateja, included Aleksander Zniszczoł, Klemens Murańka, Bartłomiej Kłusek, and Tomasz Byrt. The second group, under Maciej Maciusiak, consisted of Mateusz Kojzar, Krzysztof Biegun, Szymon Szostok, and Grzegorz Miętus. Wojciech Topór assisted Mateja, and Adam Małysz served as a consultant for both teams.

Polish Ski Federation president Apoloniusz Tajner emphasized the focus on individualized training. All groups had secured training resources, with differences in travel per diem and equipment access. Strong performances could lead to group reassignments.

At the start of the summer season, Tomasz Byrt was removed from the youth team and suspended for failing to follow the training plan and leaving consultations without permission.

== Summer season ==
On 20 May, the first training camp of the A team for the season began in Kołobrzeg. This was followed by training on the Skalite ski jumping hills in Szczyrk, which lasted until 9 June, where suits of a new cut were tested for the first time. The next camp took place from 18 to 24 June in Szczyrk and Wisła – daily training was held on the facilities in both towns (the normal hill in Szczyrk and the large hill in Wisła), with the exception of Piotr Żyła, who trained only on Malinka. During this period, the junior team trained in Zakopane.

Before the season, the International Ski Federation introduced new rules. These included new regulations regarding suits – they were required to be more form-fitting than before. Additionally, coaches gained the option to change the inrun length for their athlete in exchange for a points penalty.

=== Summer Grand Prix ===
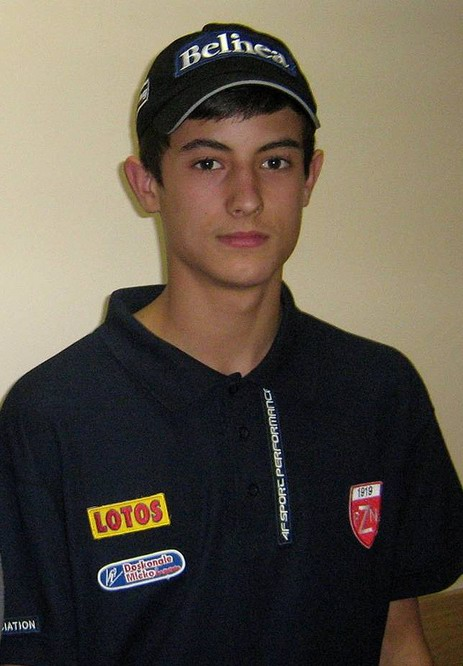
Maciej Kot – top Polish performer in the 2012 Summer Grand Prix

The 2012 FIS Ski Jumping Grand Prix began in Wisła on the Malinka ski jumping hill. 10 Polish jumpers competed in the individual event qualifications, with Kamil Stoch and Piotr Żyła pre-qualified. Dawid Kubacki won the qualifications with a 122-meter jump, and 8 Polish jumpers advanced to the main event, with Klemens Murańka and Rafał Śliż failing to qualify.

On 20 July 2012, the team event in Wisła was limited to one round due to a lighting failure. The Polish team, consisting of Żyła, Stoch, Kubacki, and Kot, finished 2nd, 1.2 points behind Slovenia, with Kot achieving the best individual score. The next day, in the individual event, Kot led after the first round with a 128-meter jump, 7.2 points ahead of Simon Ammann. Stoch was 3rd with the same distance. Kot won his first Summer Grand Prix event with a 123-meter second jump, while Stoch dropped to 7th. Other Poles in the top 20 included Bartłomiej Kłusek, Kubacki, Żyła, and Krzysztof Biegun, with Andrzej Zapotoczny, Aleksander Zniszczoł, Marcin Bachleda, and Krzysztof Miętus failing to advance to the second round. Poland took the lead in the team standings.

The next competition of the series was held in Courchevel. The best result was achieved by Kubacki, who, after two jumps of 122.5 m, finished in 5th place. Kot was 7th, maintaining his position as the leader of the LGP. Żyła finished 15th, while Kłusek, after a poor second-round jump, took the last point-scoring position. Krzysztof Miętus did not score any points. Kubacki moved up to 8th place in the overall standings. Poland, which did not participate in the mixed team event, dropped from 1st to 3rd place in the team classification, behind Germany and Japan.

On 19 August in Hinterzarten, Poland competed with the same lineup. Kubacki delivered the best-rated jump in the trial round. After the first competition round, the highest-ranked Polish jumper was Kubacki in 5th place, following a jump of 98.5 m. Ultimately, after the second attempt of 103.5 m, he finished 6th. Żyła was 7th, and Kot 11th. Miętus and Kłusek placed in the 40s. Kot lost his position as leader to Andreas Wank and dropped to 3rd place in the overall standings. After the competition, the team headed to training in Ramsau am Dachstein.

In the first competition in Hakuba, on 25 August, Kubacki once again proved the best among the Poles. After the first round he was in 13th place, but the second-longest jump of the contest (129.5 m) allowed him to finish 5th. Kłusek was 14th, Miętus 23rd, while Biegun and Zniszczoł did not score points. In the second competition, a day later, problematic weather conditions prevailed. Kubacki took 3rd place on the podium after jumps of 113 m and 127 m, despite being only 11th at the halfway point of the contest. Other Poles who scored points were Kłusek (for 8th place) and Zniszczoł (for 14th). After the competitions in Japan, which ended the first period of the season, Kubacki advanced to 4th place in the overall standings, just 6 points behind 3rd -placed Reruhi Shimizu. Maciej Kot dropped to 9th place.

For the competitions in Almaty at the Sunkar International Ski Jumping Complex, only two Polish jumpers were sent. On the first day of competition, Kłusek finished 18th, while Żyła, who had been 4th after a 130 m jump, was disqualified in the final round for an irregular suit. In the second, single-round contest, only Żyła scored points, placing 20th.

Six Polish ski jumpers were entered for the events in Hinzenbach, but Kłusek failed to pass the qualification round. Maciej Kot claimed victory once again, also leading after the first round. He jumped 87.5 m and 88.5 m. Stoch took 9th place, while Kubacki finished 19th. Żyła and Zniszczoł did not advance to the second round. In the overall standings, Kot advanced to 6th place, overtaking, among others, Kubacki.

The final round was held in Klingenthal. After the first round of competition, Kot was placed 4th, thanks to a 133 m jump. He maintained this position after reaching 130 m in the final round, thereby securing 5th place in the overall standings of the series. Stoch (11th) and Żyła (27th) also scored points. Kłusek and Kubacki were classified in the 40s, while Zniszczoł did not qualify for the main competition.

==== Overall standings ====
Place	Athlete	Appearances	Points
5.	Maciej Kot	5	310
8.	Dawid Kubacki	7	218
25.	Kamil Stoch	3	89
26.	Bartłomiej Kłusek	8	84
26.	Piotr Żyła	7	84
58.	Aleksander Zniszczoł	4	18
67.	Krzysztof Biegun	3	11
72.	Krzysztof Miętus	5	8

=== Summer Continental Cup ===
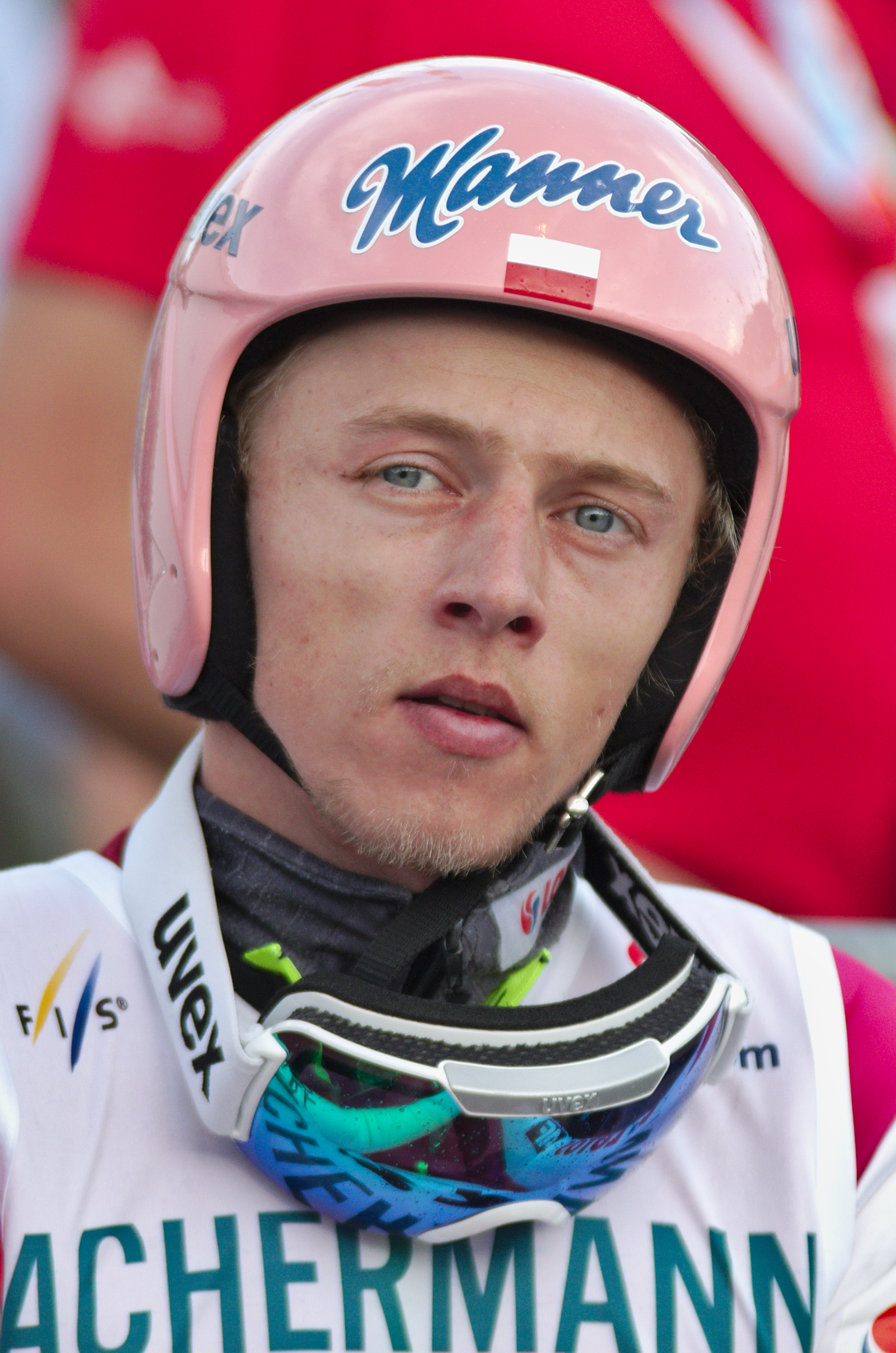
Dawid Kubacki – top Polish performer in the 2012 Summer Continental Cup

The 2012 Summer Continental Cup season began at the turn of June and July with two competitions in Stams, Austria. In the opening contest, Dawid Kubacki took 2nd place, having been ranked 8th after the first round. He recorded jumps of 103.5 m and 110 m, finishing 1.3 points behind the winner, Mackenzie Boyd-Clowes. Jan Ziobro and Marcin Bachleda also scored points, while five other Poles competed as well. The following day, Kubacki again reached the podium, this time in 3rd place. After the first round he was 11th with a jump of 106 m, but in the second round he flew 113 m, the longest jump of the entire competition. This allowed him to take the lead in the overall standings. Bachleda and Biegun also scored points. During these events, Polish athletes were disqualified three times for irregular suits.

During the first competition in Kranj on 7 July, the best-ranked Pole was Kłusek. His jumps of 107 m and 106 m gave him 5th place in the contest. Biegun finished 12th, which was his best result in the Continental Cup to that point. Bachleda, Kubacki, and Zniszczoł also scored points. For Dawid Kubacki, a relatively low 23rd place meant losing his lead in the overall Continental Cup standings. In this event, Szymon Szostok made his debut in competitions of this rank outside Poland, but he did not score points. In the second competition in the Slovenian town, the highest-placed Pole was once again Kłusek, who took 15th place after jumps of 107 m and 96 m. Zniszczoł also scored points, while Kubacki was disqualified due to an irregular suit. Compared to the standings after the round in Stams, Kubacki dropped from 1st to 5th place in the overall ranking.

On 14 and 15 July, Continental Cup events were held in Krasnaya Polyana on the ski jumps that later hosted competitions during the 2014 Winter Olympics. In the first contest, four Poles scored points. The best among them was Kubacki, who finished 8th with jumps of 134 m and 126 m; also advancing to the final round were Miętus, Kłusek, and Ziobro. On the second day, Kubacki reached the podium for the third time in that edition, initially finishing 5th (126 m and 130.5 m), but after the disqualification of Vassiliev and Hrgota he was promoted to 3rd place. Zniszczoł, Kłusek, and Miętus were classified in the 30s. In the overall standings, compared to the situation after the Kranj competitions, Kubacki moved up one place – he was 4th with a total of 240 points.

On 11 August, in the first competition in Kuopio, only one Pole – Szymon Szostok – failed to score points. Grzegorz Miętus, after jumps of 115.5 m in the first round and two metres farther in the second, finished in 8th place. Making his first start that summer, Stefan Hula placed 12th, followed by Biegun in 13th, Ziobro in 19th, Zniszczoł in 22nd, and Zapotoczny in 23rd. For the latter, these were his first points of that summer. In the second competition, the best among the Polish jumpers was Biegun, who, after attempts of 120 m and 116 m, took 8th place. Four other Poles also scored points. Zapotoczny was 7th after the first round (122 m), but with a second jump of only 106 m, he dropped to 24th in the final standings.

During the first competition in Lillehammer, on 8 September, only two Poles scored points – Łukasz Rutkowski, for whom it was the first appearance of the season, finished 20th, while Zniszczoł placed 28th. The following day, three Polish representatives scored points – Grzegorz Miętus was 20th, Łukasz Rutkowski 26th, and Zniszczoł took the last scoring position, 30th. In the overall standings, the best Pole, Dawid Kubacki, dropped from 4th to 7th place.

On 15 September, during the first competition in Chaykovsky, the best-placed Pole was Biegun, who finished 10th. Two places behind him was Jan Ziobro. Three other Poles also scored points. The next day, the best result among the Poles was achieved by Ziobro, who, after jumps of 126.5 m and 132.5 m, finished 5th. Five other Poles also scored points.

The final round of the Continental Cup took place in Klingenthal. In the first competition, held on 22 September, the best Pole was again Ziobro – after two jumps of 123.5 m, just like the week before, he finished 5th, this time ex aequo with Ole Marius Ingvaldsen. Zniszczoł was 12th, and Miętus and Zapotoczny also scored points. In the final competition of the series, held the next day, the best of the Polish representatives again placed 5th. This time, however, it was Grzegorz Miętus, who jumped 134 m in the first round and half a metre farther in the second. Zniszczoł and Biegun followed, classified in 9th and 10th place, respectively.

==== Podium standings ====
No.	Date	Location	Ski jumping hill	K-point	HS	Athlete	Jump 1	Jump 2	Points	Place	Deficit	Winner	Source
1.	30 June 2012	(Austria) Stams	Brunnentalschanzen	K-105	HS 115	Dawid Kubacki	103.5 m	110.0 m	233.3 pts	2.	1.3 pts	Mackenzie Boyd-Clowes	
2.	1 July 2012	(Austria) Stams	Brunnentalschanzen	K-105	HS 115	Dawid Kubacki	106.0 m	113.0 m	241.2 pts	3.	9.0 pts	Lukas Müller	
3.	15 July 2012	(Russia) Krasnaya Polyana	RusSki Gorki Jumping Center	K-125	HS 140	Dawid Kubacki	126.0 m	130.5 m	224.0 pts	3.	11.7 pts	Anders Jacobsen	

==== General standings ====
Place	Athlete	Appearances	Points
8.	Dawid Kubacki	6	240
17.	Grzegorz Miętus	12	161
21.	Krzysztof Biegun	14	145
21.	Jan Ziobro	14	145
25.	Aleksander Zniszczoł	12.	136
41.	Bartłomiej Kłusek	6	78
63.	Andrzej Zapotoczny	10	42
66.	Marcin Bachleda	4	34
66.	Stefan Hula	4	34
77.	Krzysztof Miętus	10	23
80.	Łukasz Rutkowski	6	20

=== Other competitions ===
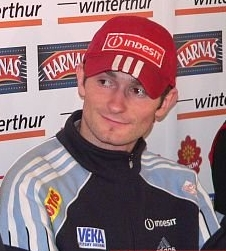
Rafał Śliż – 2nd place in the first FIS Cup competition in Wisła

On 21–22 July, the international Pokal der Wohnungsbaugessellschaft competition took place in Bad Freienwalde. Victory in the open category (ages 11–29) on the K-60 hill was claimed by Bartłomiej Czyż (68.5 m and 69.5 m), with Łukasz Podżorski 2nd (66 m and 68.5 m). Other Polish athletes won in their respective age categories: Łukasz Podżorski (17 years), Tomasz Pilch (12–13 years), Kacper Kupczak (18–21 years), Anna Twardosz (special K-21 class), Monika Luber (16 years women), Mateusz Małyjurek (special K-42 class), and Marcin Małyjurek (special K-21 class).

On 26–29 July, the FIS Schüler Grand Prix was held, where the highest-placed Poles were Wiktor Fickowski, 8th in the 11-year-old category, and Dawid Heberny, 8th in the 12-year-old category. In the team event, the Polish teams finished 7th and 8th.

Sebastian Okas represented Poland at the FIS Cup in Kuopio on 8–9 August 2012, finishing 31st and 39th.

On 20 August, during the FIS Youth Cup (for athletes born in 1998 or later) on the HS77 hill in Hinterzarten, Dawid Jarząbek won with jumps of 77 m and 75.5 m. Paweł Wąsek placed 16th, Paweł Chyc 26th, and Bartosz Czyż 39th.

On 1 September, the Jiří Raška Memorial was held in Frenštát pod Radhoštěm. Bartłomiej Kłusek finished 4th, and Andrzej Zapotoczny 5th.

During the FIS Cup in Wisła on 8–9 September, in the first competition, Rafał Śliż was 2nd (jumps of 123.5 m and 125 m). Points were also scored by: Artur Kukuła (4th), Dawid Kanik (9th), Wojciech Gąsienica-Kotelnicki (11th), Jakub Wolny (19th), Stanisław Biela (22nd), Jakub Kot (23rd), Konrad Janota (25th), Mateusz Kojzar (25th), Łukasz Podżorski (29th), and Jan Zięba (30th). Athletes outside the top 30 included: Krystian Gryczuk, Szymon Szostok, Piotr Świerczek, Michał Milczanowski, Wojciech Fąferko, Piotr Mojżesz, Sebastian Okas, and Patryk Dunajski.

In the second competition, Artur Kukuła was 2nd (122.5 m and 124.5 m), and points were also scored by: Gąsienica-Kotelnicki (6th), Kanik (10th), Janota (19th), Podżorski (21st), Kojzar (24th), Adam Ruda (27th), and Wolny (28th). Athletes who did not score points included: Gryczuk, Kot, Biela, Milczanowski, Szostok, Świerczek, Zięba, Mojżesz, Przemysław Kantyka, Fąferko, Dunajski, and Okas.

== Winter season ==
=== World Cup ===
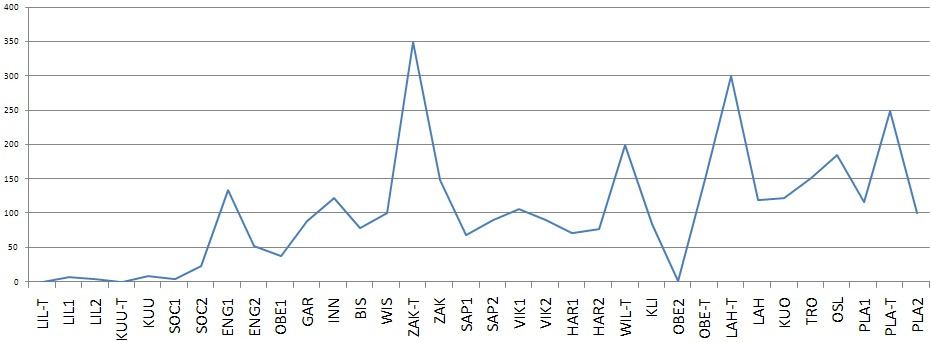
Points scored by Poland in individual World Cup competitions

Poland began its 2012–13 FIS Ski Jumping World Cup campaign with an individual normal hill competition in Lillehammer on 24 November. Points were scored by Maciej Kot (25th place) and Kamil Stoch (30th). Outside the top 30 were Dawid Kubacki, Krzysztof Miętus, and Piotr Żyła, while Bartłomiej Kłusek failed to qualify. On the large hill, only Miętus scored points, finishing 26th with jumps of 128.5 m and 125.5 m. Stoch and Żyła placed in the 40s, and the remaining Poles in the 50s of the results table. Poland was 10th in the Nations Cup standings, with Maciej Kot as the highest-ranked individual Pole (32nd place, 6 points). The team's performance was described in the media as "very weak".

The next competitions were held in Rukatunturi, with Kłusek absent from the team. In the team event, Poland, composed of Stoch, Żyła, Kubacki, and Kot, finished last in 11th place, with Kubacki recording the longest jump at 123.5 m. In the individual competition, Kubacki scored his first World Cup points, finishing 22nd with jumps of 127.5 m and 115.5 m. Kot was 32nd, while Miętus and Żyła placed in the 50s, and Stoch did not advance to the main competition.

Subsequently, Żyła and Stoch traveled with head coach Łukasz Kruczek to training in Ramsau am Dachstein, Austria. For the World Cup in Krasnaya Polyana, the team consisted of Dawid Kubacki, Maciej Kot, Bartłomiej Kłusek, and Krzysztof Miętus, with coach Zbigniew Klimowski. In both Russian competitions, points were scored by Kot and Kubacki. In the first, they placed 28th and 30th, respectively, and in the second, 22nd and 17th. Coach Kruczek later admitted he had considered resigning after the weak early-season results, but the athletes opposed it.

For the competitions in Engelberg, Switzerland, before the Four Hills Tournament, Kamil Stoch and Piotr Żyła joined the team. The first competition was on 15 December. Stoch led after the first round with a jump of 132.5 m, holding a 0.8-point advantage over 2nd-placed Schlierenzauer. In the second round, he jumped 134 m and finished 2nd, 0.1 points behind Andreas Kofler. Kubacki finished 9th, Kot 17th, Miętus 23rd, Murańka 28th, and Żyła did not score points. This was the largest number of points scored by Poles at that time (134 points). In the second Swiss competition, three Poles scored points: Kot 13th, Stoch 14th, and Kubacki 17th. Stoch was the highest-ranked Pole in the overall standings (18th), and Poland moved up to 7th in the Nations Cup.

Seven Poles were entered for the 2012–13 Four Hills Tournament. Before the first competition in Oberstdorf, Stoch won the trial round. In the first round, he outperformed his KO-system opponent, Jaka Hvala, jumping 132.5 m and ranking 5th. He ultimately finished 13th after landing at 125 m in the final round, trailing the leader, Jacobsen, by 44.3 points. Hula finished 21st, Kubacki 26th, and Murańka 28th. Żyła, Miętus, and Kot were eliminated in the KO round.

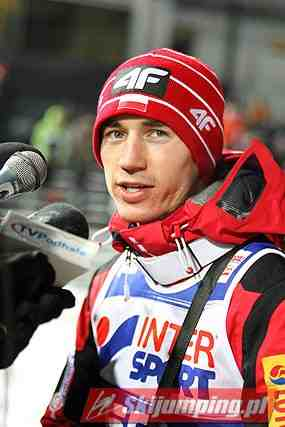
Kamil Stoch – 3rd-place finisher in the overall standings of the 2012–13 World Cup

For the Garmisch-Partenkirchen competition, all Poles qualified except Murańka, who was disqualified. In the first round, Stoch defeated Simon Ammann and was 2nd after a 142 m jump. Kot was 6th (134.5 m), and Kubacki and Żyła also advanced. In the final round, Stoch dropped to 6th (tied with Dmitriy Vassiliev), Kot moved up to 5th, Kubacki was 28th, and Żyła 30th. After this competition, Stoch moved to 7th in the Four Hills overall standings, 60.2 points behind the leader.

Before the Innsbruck event, Klemens Murańka was sent back to Poland. All other Polish representatives qualified, with Stoch and Kot 2nd in qualifying alongside Jacobsen, and Miętus 5th. After the first round, Stoch was 4th with a 124.5 m jump. In the second round, he jumped 1.5 m less and finished 2nd, 12.8 points behind winner Schlierenzauer. Kot was 9th, Żyła (a lucky loser) 22nd, and Miętus 27th; the remaining Poles did not score points. After these competitions, Stoch moved to 6th in the Four Hills standings, 60.5 points behind the leader. In the top 30, Kot was 24th, Kubacki 26th, and Żyła 30th.

In the qualifications for the Bischofshofen competition, the highest-placed Polish jumper was Stoch, who finished 2nd. After the first round, in which he jumped 131 m, he was in 4th place. 5th-placed Maciej Kot jumped one meter farther; Stefan Hula (who defeated Severin Freund) and Piotr Żyła also advanced. In the final round, Stoch maintained his position, jumping 131.5 m slightly late on the take-off. Kot fell to 10th place, while Hula and Żyła finished in the last point-scoring positions.

In the overall World Cup standings, compared to the situation before the Tournament, Kamil Stoch moved up from 18th to 8th place, while Maciej Kot advanced from 30th to 19th. Two Polish representatives scored their first points of the season – Piotr Żyła, ranked 47th, and Stefan Hula, one position higher. Other Poles dropped in the rankings. In the Nations Cup, Poland moved up from 7th to 6th place, ahead of Russia.

On January 8, 10 Polish jumpers started in the qualifications for the Wisła competition, 8 of whom advanced to the main event (Jan Ziobro and Klemens Murańka were eliminated). Maciej Kot won the qualification round. The following day, the first-ever competition on the Malinka ski jumping hill took place under variable wind conditions. After the opening round, the highest-placed Pole was Piotr Żyła, 12th after a jump of 125 m. Kamil Stoch was three positions lower with 122 m. Maciej Kot and Stefan Hula also advanced, while Aleksander Zniszczoł, Łukasz Rutkowski, Krzysztof Miętus (40s), Dawid Kubacki, and Bartłomiej Kłusek (50s) finished the round. In the final round, Żyła jumped 123 m, achieving the highest position of his career so far, 6th place. Stoch was 7th, Kot 13th, and Hula 27th. Some Polish jumpers complained about fatigue due to the high frequency of competitions at the start of the year.

On January 11, a team competition was held at Wielka Krokiew. Poland jumped in the lineup: Żyła, Kot, Miętus, and Stoch. After the first round, they were leading, ahead of Slovenia by 25.7 points. They ultimately finished 2nd, with one factor being Miętus' jump of 108 m. Qualifications for the individual event took place on January 12. Among the 11 Polish representatives, 8 advanced to the top 40, while Kamil Stoch was prequalified. Only Murańka and Kłusek failed to advance.

After the first competition round, Stoch was the leader (jumping 133 m). Kot (9th), Ziobro (11th), Żyła, Zniszczoł, Hula, and Miętus also advanced. Kubacki and Rutkowski did not score points. Stoch ultimately stood on the lowest podium step, surpassed by Norwegian jumpers after a 127 m jump. Kot moved up to 5th, Żyła 18th, Ziobro 20th, and the rest finished in the 30s. After the home competitions, Poland advanced to 5th place in the Nations Cup, ahead of Japan. Individually, Stoch moved from 8th to 7th, along with several other Polish jumpers.

The next World Cup round took place in Sapporo a week later. In the first competition, the highest-placed Pole was Stoch (9th). Kot was 10th, while Żyła and Hula also scored points, and Miętus was disqualified. The second competition was held in difficult weather conditions. Stoch placed 5th, Kot 14th, Kubacki 18th (after being in the top 10 after the first jump), Żyła 22nd, and Miętus 25th. After the competitions in Japan, Stoch advanced another position.

The first ski flying competitions of the 2012–13 season took place in Vikersund. Kamil Stoch achieved the highest Polish result, finishing 5th. After the first round, he was 3rd, but despite matching the Polish record with a 232.5-meter jump in the second round, he dropped in the rankings. Piotr Żyła placed 6th, with Maciej Kot (16th) and Krzysztof Miętus (25th) also scoring points. In the second competition, Stoch was the highest-placed Pole in 7th, followed by Żyła (10th), Kot (14th), Miętus (22nd), and Kubacki (28th). After these events, Stoch moved to 5th in the overall World Cup standings, overtaking Andreas Kofler. In the ski flying standings, Stoch was 6th, and Żyła was 8th.

The same Polish team competed in Harrachov. The first competition, postponed to 3 February 2013 due to challenging wind conditions, saw Stoch finish 9th, benefiting from over 50 points of compensation for a lowered gate in his first jump. Miętus was 14th, Kot 16th, and Żyła 22nd. Kubacki, disrupted by a strong gust in his second jump, earned one point. In the single-round second competition held the same day, Stoch was 8th with a 177.5-meter jump, followed by Żyła (13th), Kot (16th), Miętus (21st), and Kubacki (34th). Coach Łukasz Kruczek described the day as "crazy" and the competitions as risky. After Harrachov, Stoch dropped from 6th to 8th in the ski flying standings, while maintaining 5th in the overall World Cup standings.

For the opening individual competition of the FIS Team Tour 2013 in Willingen, only three Poles qualified, but it was canceled. The team competition was held on 9 February 2013 with Poland fielding Żyła, Miętus, Kubacki, and Stoch, finishing 5th.

On 13 February 2013, the Klingenthal competition saw Żyła take 6th place with jumps of 135 m and 128.5 m. Miętus, 7th after a 145-meter first jump, finished 11th. Kot placed 13th, while Stoch, disqualified in the second round, was 30th. Kubacki did not score points. Poland retained 5th place in the FIS Team Tour standings but widened the gap to leaders Slovenia.

Due to the upcoming World Championships, the Oberstdorf ski flying events on 16 February 2013 featured Poland's junior team: Klemens Murańka, Krzysztof Biegun, Jan Ziobro, Bartłomiej Kłusek, and Aleksander Zniszczoł. For Biegun, Ziobro, and Kłusek, it was their debut on a flying hill, and for Biegun, his World Cup debut. Only Zniszczoł failed to qualify. In the trial round, all Poles finished in the bottom 10, but Biegun (175.5 m) and Ziobro (173.5 m) set personal bests. In the competition, only Biegun scored, jumping 180 m and 172 m to finish 30th. Biegun entered the overall World Cup standings at 80th. Poland, previously 5th in the FIS Team Tour, was overtaken by Japan and the Czech Republic.

The final FIS Team Tour event was the team ski flying competition in Oberstdorf on 17 February 2013. Poland replaced Kłusek with Zniszczoł, with Biegun jumping 197.5 m in the first group. Poland was 6th after the first round and held that position until the end.

The first World Cup events after the World Championships were in Lahti. Stoch led both training sessions and trial rounds for both competitions. In the team event on 9 March 2013, Poland (Kot, Żyła, Miętus, Stoch) was 4th after the first round, 2.3 points behind 3rd-placed Austria. They ultimately finished 3rd. In the individual competition on 10 March 2013, Stoch placed 5th with jumps of 124 m and 123.5 m, having been second after the first round. Kot took 6th (125.5 m, 125.5 m), Żyła was 12th, and Miętus 19th. Kubacki and Hula did not score points.

In the Kuopio competition on 12 March 2013, Stoch led after the first round with a 135 m jump, holding a 7.9-point advantage over second-placed Severin Freund. He jumped 129 m in the second round to secure victory. Żyła placed 15th, and Kubacki 24th. Kot, Hula, and Miętus did not score points. After the Finland competitions, Stoch maintained 5th in the overall World Cup standings, reducing the gap to 4th-placed Anders Jacobsen from 97 to 45 points. Kot moved from 18th to 17th, and Żyła from 26th to 25th.

The Trondheim competition began on 14 March 2013. Żyła won the qualifications with a 140 m jump. Stoch secured his second consecutive victory with jumps of 131 m and 140 m, placing 3rd after the first round. Żyła was 9th, Kubacki 17th, Kot 24th, and Hula 29th. Miętus finished last. After this competition, Stoch advanced to 3rd in the overall World Cup standings.

The next day, 16 March 2013, competition began at Holmenkollbakken. After the first jump, Stoch (132 m) was 2nd, and Żyła (135.5 m) 3rd. In the final round, Żyła jumped 133.5 m to secure his first career victory, tied with Gregor Schlierenzauer. Stoch, jumping from a lowered gate at the coach's request, landed at 121 m and dropped to 4th. Kot was 11th, and Kubacki 20th. Miętus did not score points, and Hula was disqualified in qualifications. Thanks to his victory, Żyła moved from 24th to 19th in the overall World Cup standings.

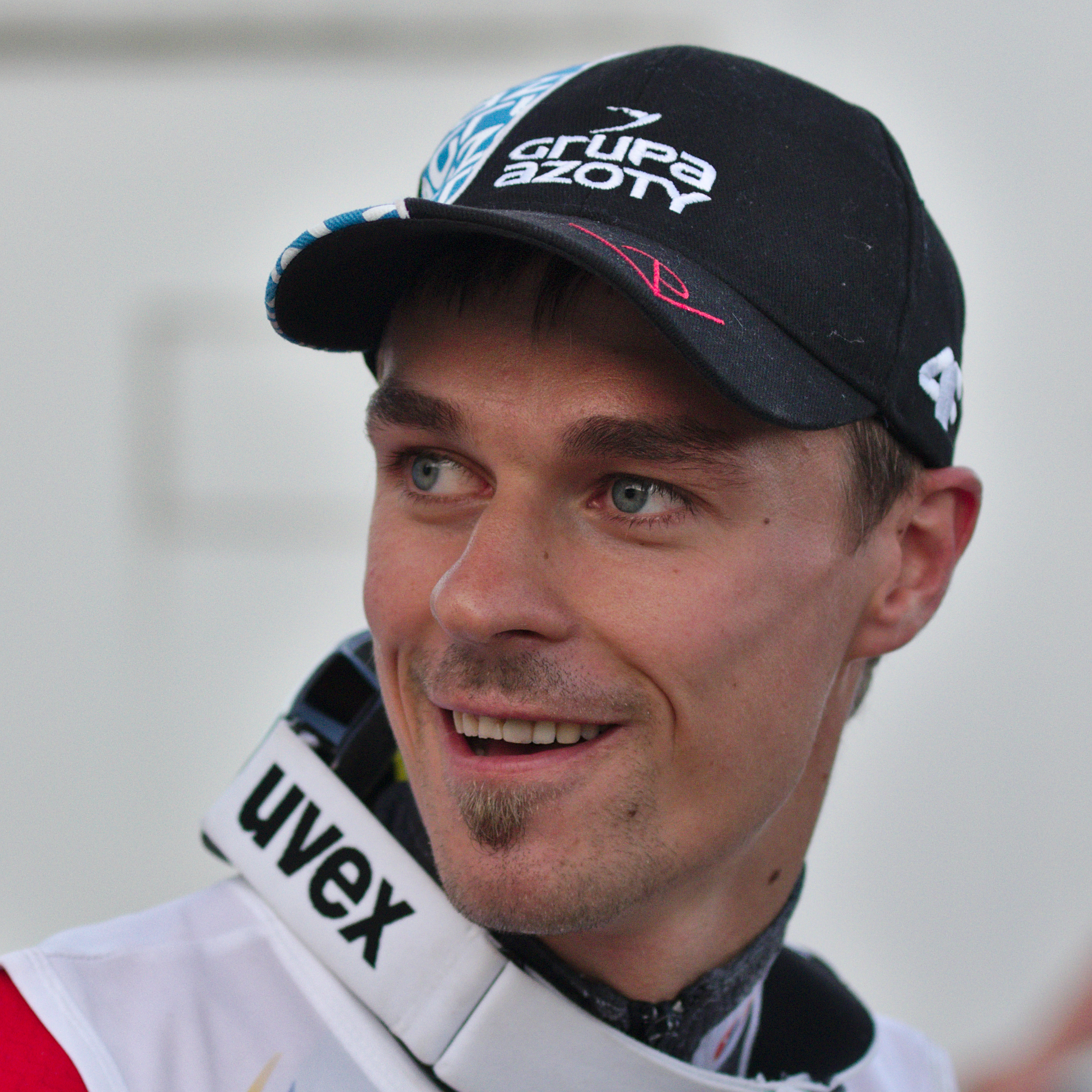
Piotr Żyła – 8th in the Ski Flying World Cup in the 2012–13 season

The season-ending World Cup events began on 21 March 2013 at Letalnica bratov Gorišek. In the official training, Stoch and Żyła took the top two spots. Only Hula failed to qualify for the first competition. After the first round, Żyła was 4th with a 212.5 m jump, Kot 6th with 205.5 m, and Stoch 11th with 200 m. Kubacki and Miętus did not advance to the second round. In the final round, Stoch held 11th, Kot dropped to 8th, and Żyła jumped 216.5 m to secure 3rd place. Stoch reduced his gap to 2nd-placed Anders Bardal in the overall World Cup standings to 63 points. The team competition followed, with Poland (Żyła, Kot, Miętus, Stoch) placing 5th after the first round and moving to 4th in the second.

In the final World Cup competition on 24 March 2013, Poland fielded Stoch, Kot, Żyła, and Kubacki. Żyła achieved the highest placement, finishing 5th with jumps of 201.5 m and 216 m. Stoch was 8th, Kot 18th, and Kubacki 21st.

Stoch maintained third place in the 2012–13 overall World Cup standings, as his only rival, Severin Freund, finished 9th in the final competition. Żyła's performance moved him to 15th, overtaking Kot, who dropped from 17th to 18th. In the ski flying standings, Żyła overtook Stoch to finish 8th, with Stoch in 9th and Kot in 16th.

==== Overall World Cup standings ====
Place	Athlete	Points	Deficit	Change
3.	Kamil Stoch	953	667	+2
15.	Piotr Żyła	485	1,135	+4
18.	Maciej Kot	460	1,160	+17
36.	Dawid Kubacki	142	1,478	DNS
38.	Krzysztof Miętus	103	1,517	+12
54.	Stefan Hula	28	1,592	DNS
65.	Jan Ziobro	11	1,609	DNS
68.	Aleksander Zniszczoł	8	1,612	-21
75.	Klemens Murańka	6	1,614	-19
81.	Krzysztof Biegun	1	1,619	DNS

==== Ski flying World Cup standings ====
Place	Athlete	Points	Deficit	Change
8.	Piotr Żyła	200	344	+15
9.	Kamil Stoch	198	346	-3
16.	Maciej Kot	108	436	+16
30.	Krzysztof Miętus	42	502	+13
42.	Dawid Kubacki	14	530	DNS
58.	Krzysztof Biegun	1	543	DNS

==== Four Hills Tournament overall standings ====
Place	Athlete	Appearances	Jumps	Points	Deficit	Change
4.	Kamil Stoch	4	8	1,027.2	-73.0	+4
20.	Maciej Kot	4	7	840.6	-259.6	+14
23.	Piotr Żyła	4	7	798.8	-301.4	+16
30.	Stefan Hula	4	6	704.2	-396.0	+32
31.	Dawid Kubacki	4	6	698.0	-402.2	+32
37.	Krzysztof Miętus	4	5	569.1	-531.1	DNS
51.	Klemens Murańka	1	2	242.6	-857.6	DNS

==== Podium finishes in World Cup competitions ====
No.	Date	Location	Ski jumping hill	K-point	HS	Athlete	Jump 1	Jump 2	Points	Place	Deficit	Winner	Source
1.	15 December 2012	(Switzerland) Engelberg	Gross-Titlis-Schanze	K-125	HS-137	Kamil Stoch	132.5 m	134.0 m	272.5 pts	2.	0.1 pts	Andreas Kofler	
2.	4 January 2013	(Austria) Innsbruck	Bergisel	K-120	HS-130	Kamil Stoch	124.5 m	123.0 m	240.9 pts	2.	12.8 pts	Gregor Schlierenzauer	
3.	12 January 2013	(Poland) Zakopane	Wielka Krokiew	K-120	HS-134	Kamil Stoch	133.0 m	127.0 m	268.7 pts	3.	4.6 pts	Anders Jacobsen	
4.	12 March 2013	(Finland) Kuopio	Puijo	K-120	HS-127	Kamil Stoch	135.0 m	129.0 m	268.1 pts	1.	–	–	
5.	15 March 2013	(Norway) Trondheim	Granåsen	K-123	HS-140	Kamil Stoch	131.0 m	140.0 m	280.4 pts	1.	–	–	
6.	17 March 2013	(Norway) Oslo	Holmenkollbakken	K-120	HS-134	Piotr Żyła	135.5 m	133.5 m	270.1 pts	1.	–	–	
7.	22 March 2013	(Slovenia) Planica	Letalnica	K-185	HS-215	Piotr Żyła	212.5 m	216.5 m	402.5 pts	3.	9.7 pts	Gregor Schlierenzauer	

=== Continental Cup ===
In the first Continental Cup competition held on 8 December in Almaty, five Polish ski jumpers participated. Klemens Murańka took 2nd place with jumps of 131.5 m and 128.5 m. Aleksander Zniszczoł finished 8th, while the other Polish representatives (Jan Ziobro, Stefan Hula, Stanisław Biela) did not score points. The next day, Murańka again took 2nd place with jumps of 129.5 m and 133 m. Biela placed 28th, earning points, while Zniszczoł was disqualified. After the Kazakhstan events, Murańka was 2nd in the overall Continental Cup standings. For the competitions held on 27–28 December 2012 in Engelberg, Switzerland, a different group of athletes was sent. Jan Ziobro took 3rd place in the first competition, moving up from 9th after a 115.5 m first jump with a 124 m second jump, the longest of the event. Stefan Hula and Łukasz Rutkowski also scored points, finishing in the 20s. Jan Ziobro, Stefan Hula, Łukasz Rutkowski, Andrzej Zapotoczny and Jakub Kot finished outside the top 30. In the second Engelberg competition, Hula took 2nd place with jumps of 132.5 m and 130 m. Rutkowski was 16th, while the other Poles did not advance to the second round.

On 5 January 2013, Poland hosted the Continental Cup in Zakopane. Only one round was held. Of the 13 Polish jumpers, four scored points: Murańka was 6th, Marcin Bachleda 11th, Zniszczoł 14th, and Rutkowski 18th. The next day, the full competition was held. Zniszczoł, leading after the first round, was disqualified in the second for an irregular suit. Murańka placed 5th, Ziobro 7th, Bartłomiej Kłusek 11th, Rutkowski 15th, and Krzysztof Biegun 19th. After the home events, Murańka solidified his 2nd-place position in the overall standings, increasing his lead over the 3rd-placed jumper to 79 points while trailing leader Stefan Kraft by 100 points. Hula dropped from 9th to 19th.

For the Continental Cup events in Sapporo from 11 to 13 January 2013, three Polish jumpers were sent. One competition was held on the normal hill and two on the large hill. Zapotoczny scored points in all three, finishing 20th, 11th, and 19th. Kot earned points with 30th and 27th places, while Biela scored in the final event with 30th. The next events took place on 19–20 January 2013 in Bischofshofen, Austria. Ziobro was the highest-placed Pole in the first competition, finishing 7th. Hula was 10th, and Zapotoczny 26th. Other Poles placed in the 50s and 60s. In the second competition, Ziobro placed 5th, with Hula and Kot also scoring points.

The following competitions were held in Titisee-Neustadt. In the first, Hula finished 8th and Ziobro 26th. The second competition consisted of one round. Rafał Śliż was the highest-placed Pole at 13th (127 m), followed by Ziobro (26th, 124.5 m) and Rutkowski (30th, 123.5 m). Other Poles did not score points. In Planica in early February 2013, the same group competed. Hula took 2nd place with jumps of 128.5 m and 125.5 m. Ziobro was 10th, Rutkowski 17th, Śliż 28th, with Kot and Zapotoczny in the 60s and 70s. Later that day, Hula won with jumps of 129 m and 130 m, beating Stefan Kraft by 5.4 points. Ziobro, Rutkowski, and Kot also scored points. Hula's two podiums propelled him to 6th in the overall standings with 339 points, while Murańka dropped from the top 10 to 13th.

Less than a week later, three competitions were held in Iron Mountain on 9–10 February 2013. In the first, Zniszczoł placed 7th, moving up from 24th after the first round. Kłusek, Grzegorz Miętus, and Biegun finished in the 20s, with Murańka 21st. Biela did not score. In the second competition that day, Biegun was 7th, Murańka 14th, Kłusek 18th, and Zniszczoł 27th. Biela and Miętus were in the 40s. On 10 February 2013, Murańka placed 5th, Kłusek 12th, Biegun 17th, and Zniszczoł 27th, with Biela and Miętus in the 40s. Despite earning points, Murańka dropped from 13th to 14th in the overall standings, and Hula fell from the top 10 to 12th. In mid-February 2013, competitions were held in Brotterode, Germany. In the first, only Rutkowski scored points, finishing 17th with two 109 m jumps. In the second, Rutkowski was 9th, with Zapotoczny and Miętus in the late 20s.

On 23–24 February 2013, Continental Cup events were held in Wisła, Poland. In the first competition, Biegun led after a 124.5 m first jump, 0.1 points ahead of Matic Benedik. His 124 m second jump earned him 3rd place. Ziobro was 6th, Miętus 9th, and Kłusek 18th. The next day, Ziobro took 3rd with jumps of 124.5 m and 126.5 m. Biegun was 10th, Rutkowski 15th, Miętus 23rd, and Zniszczoł 24th. Ziobro's podium moved him from 22nd to 17th in the overall standings, while Biegun climbed from 55th to 30th.

The next Continental Cup round was held in Liberec in early March. In the first competition, all Poles scored points, a first for the season. Rutkowski was 4th with jumps of 96.5 m and 98 m, 0.5 points off the podium. Biegun was 5th, Ziobro 13th, Murańka 15th, Kłusek 22nd, and Zniszczoł 23rd. In the single-round second competition, four Poles scored: Ziobro was 8th, Zniszczoł 9th, Murańka 18th, and Rutkowski 28th. Kłusek and Biegun placed in the 60s. Ziobro's points returned him to 15th in the overall standings. For the events on the normal hill in Vikersund, Norway, on 8–9 March 2013, eight Poles competed. In the first, Ziobro took 2nd with jumps of 115 m and 119.5 m, Biegun was 6th, and Biela 20th. The others (Murańka, Zniszczoł, Kłusek, Kot) placed between the 50s and 70s, except Miętus, who was disqualified. In the second competition, only Biegun (12th) and Miętus (25th) scored points. After Norway, Ziobro advanced from 15th to 11th in the overall standings.

The final Continental Cup events were held in Nizhny Tagil, Russia, on 16–17 March 2013, without Kot. Ziobro took 3rd place with jumps of 93.5 m and 94 m. Biegun was 9th, Kłusek 18th, Miętus 23rd, and Biela 30th. In the last competition, Kłusek placed 6th, dropping from second after the first round. Ziobro was 8th, Biegun 9th, Miętus 11th, and Zniszczoł 26th. Biela did not score. Ziobro's performance earned him 8th place in the final 2012–13 Continental Cup standings with 548 points, the only Pole in the top 20. Murańka dropped from 20th to 21st.

==== Continental Cup overall standings ====
Place	Athlete	Points	Deficit	Change
8.	Jan Ziobro	548	119	+65
21.	Klemens Murańka	350	317	+16
22.	Stefan Hula	339	328	–
23.	Krzysztof Biegun	324	343	DNS
35.	Łukasz Rutkowski	192	475	DNS
39.	Bartłomiej Kłusek	154	513	-8
43.	Aleksander Zniszczoł	144	523	-22
63.	Grzegorz Miętus	90	577	+9
81.	Andrzej Zapotoczny	55	612	+38
100.	Marcin Bachleda	24	643	-17
104.	Rafał Śliż	23	644	+18
109.	Jakub Kot	18	649	-35
111.	Stanisław Biela	16	651	DNS

=== World Championships ===
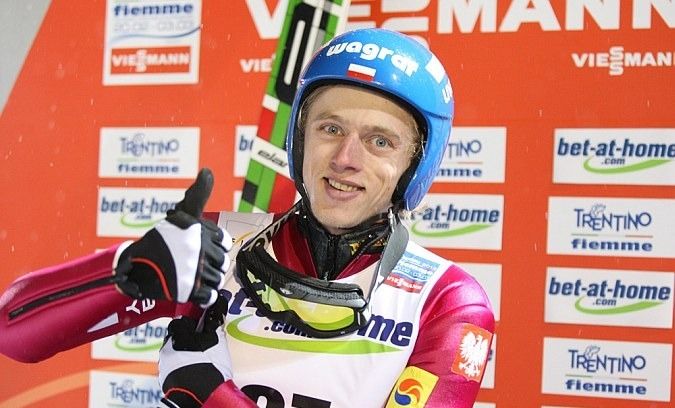
Dawid Kubacki after his qualification jump

The Polish team at the FIS Nordic World Ski Championships 2013 included 6 ski jumpers: Kamil Stoch, Maciej Kot, Piotr Żyła, Dawid Kubacki, Krzysztof Miętus, and Stefan Hula.

The first official jumps took place on Wednesday, February 20, during the training sessions ahead of the individual competition on the normal hill. In all three sessions, the best result among the Poles was achieved by Dawid Kubacki. In the first series, after a jump of 99.5 m, he placed 5th out of 58 competitors. Miętus was 12th (97 m), Stoch 16th (96 m), Żyła 19th (93.5 m), Kot 26th (89 m), and the lowest-ranked Pole was Hula in 32nd (93 m). Maciej Kot commented that the conditions during this training were "changeable and difficult".

In the second series, Kubacki was the only athlete to surpass 100 m (by 5.5 m), finishing 1st on the leaderboard. Also in the top 10 were Miętus (99.5 m, 8th place) and Kot (96 m, 10th place). Żyła improved, placing 15th with a 97 m jump. Stoch finished 19th (95 m), and Hula 21st (94 m). In the third training session, Kubacki came in 4th with 98.5 m. One spot behind him was Stoch (100 m). Żyła placed 8th (96.5 m), followed by Kot with the same distance. Hula (95.5 m) and Miętus (93.5 m) placed 20th and 21st. Kot admitted that he used a different suit in each session, while Kubacki, after his good training performances, told the Polish Press Agency:

The last training sessions in Szczyrk helped me a lot. Already there everything was working the way it should. Besides, I can't hide that I like this hill. In the summer, during camps, I was also jumping well here.

The following day, three more official training sessions took place. In the first, Piotr Żyła took 2nd place with a 99 m jump. Kubacki was 9th (98 m), Kot 11th (97.5 m), Stoch 16th (95 m), Hula 22nd (95.5 m), and Miętus 26th (93.5 m). In the second session, the highest-ranked Pole was Stoch in 7th place (96.5 m). Kubacki was 16th, Żyła 17th (both 96 m), Miętus 25th (93.5 m), Kot 29th (94 m), and Hula 35th (90.5 m). In the final training, Stoch (99 m) and Kubacki (98.5 m) closed out the top 10, while the other Poles recorded results around the 30th positions.

Coach Łukasz Kruczek selected the following 4 jumpers for the qualification: Piotr Żyła, Maciej Kot, Dawid Kubacki, and Kamil Stoch. The latter, due to his position in the overall World Cup standings, was automatically qualified, but still produced a 99.5 m jump. The other three all placed in the top 10 of the qualifying round: Kubacki was 5th (99.5 m), Kot 6th (101.5 m), and Żyła 10th (100.5 m).

In the trial round before the individual competition, the best result belonged to Kamil Stoch, who landed at 103 m. Kot was 6th (99 m), Kubacki 11th (101.5 m), and Żyła 20th (94.5 m). In the competition itself, Kubacki jumped first among the Poles. His 93.5 m jump did not qualify him for the final round, and he finished 31st. Piotr Żyła, after a 95.5 m jump, was briefly ranked 6th, but at the end of the round was placed 26th. Maciej Kot, with 101.5 m, was 3rd, and after the first series he sat in 11th place. Kamil Stoch, starting from the 11th gate after the jury raised the inrun, landed at 102 m. He became the leader. Only four jumpers followed him, and he was surpassed solely by Anders Bardal. The Pole trailed Bardal by 2.8 points, while leading 3rd-placed Schlierenzauer by 1.3 points.

The second series began from a gate five positions higher than the first. Żyła, after landing at 95 m, temporarily placed 2nd and ultimately finished 23rd, gaining three positions compared to the first round. Kot jumped two meters farther, and though he did not lead after his attempt, he maintained his 11th place. Stoch's second jump was 97 m, five meters shorter than his first. He also struggled at the landing – all three style judges gave him 17 points. After his attempt, he dropped to 7th place and ultimately finished 8th. In post-competition interviews, he admitted to being very dissatisfied with the result – despite being relaxed, he made a mistake during the jump:

Right now, I feel really terrible and don't know what to say. I don't want to say something I'll later regret. I keep messing up competitions, and these are some of the most important in my life. There was a huge chance to do something great here, and I just let it slip away. That's what makes me the most angry.

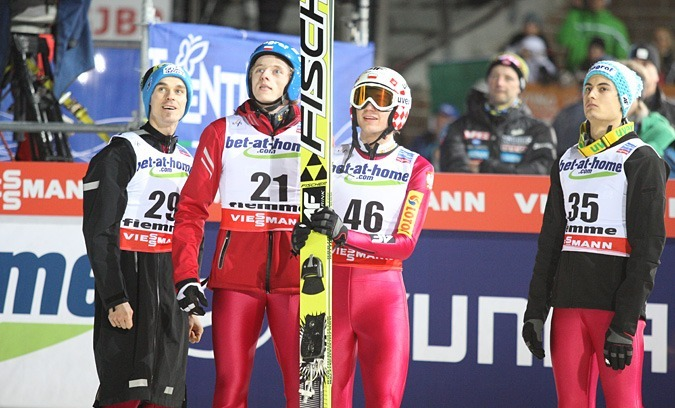
Polish team awaiting Kamil Stoch's result on the large hill

On 25 February, the official trainings on the large hill began. In the classification of the first one, Stoch placed highest – he was 7th after a jump of 118.5 m. Two places lower was Kot, who jumped one metre farther. Miętus was 16th (115.5 m), and the other Poles were in the 30s (Żyła – 22nd, Hula – 24th, and Kubacki – 26th). In the next series, Stoch was 2nd, improving by 10 metres, Żyła was 6th (126 m), Kot 7th (126.5 m), Kubacki 16th (124 m), Miętus 20th (123.5 m), and Hula 31st (120 m). In the third series, Stoch was the best competitor among all 55 starters. He was the only one to exceed the 130-metre mark, by half a metre. Kot was 4th (124.5 m), Kubacki 5th (128.5 m), Żyła 12th (122 m), Miętus 15th (124.5 m), and once again the weakest of the Poles was Hula, who placed 23rd with 117.5 m.

On the second day of training, some of the Polish representatives did not jump. In the first two sessions, these were Stoch and Kot. In the first series, Kubacki was 17th (120 m), Żyła 19th (119 m), Miętus 30th (116 m), and Hula 32nd (114.5 m). In the next round, Kubacki and Żyła were in the middle of the 20s, Miętus was 19th, and Hula, after a 115 m jump, placed 41st. In the last training session, only the two weakest Poles so far – Miętus and Hula – took part. The former proved better, landing at 125 m, five metres farther than Hula.

In the trial round before qualifications, the furthest Pole was Kot, who, after reaching 121.5 m, placed 8th. Kubacki was 12th, Stoch 17th, and Żyła 31st.

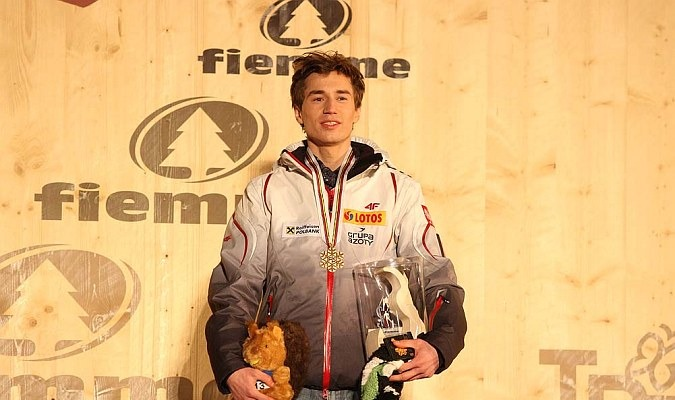
Kamil Stoch with the gold medal at Val di Fiemme

In the trial round before the main competition, Stoch was 2nd after reaching 127.5 m. Kubacki was the first Pole to jump in the competition itself. His 126.5 m attempt placed him 2nd at that moment, but after the first round he dropped to 19th. Piotr Żyła finished two places lower after a 124 m jump, while Maciej Kot was 18th after going one metre farther. Kamil Stoch delivered the longest jump of the first series – 131.5 m – for which he received three style marks of 19.5, one 19, and one perfect 20. This allowed him to overtake then-leader Peter Prevc by 5.1 points and lead after the first round. In the second series, Żyła jumped 126.5 m and, after his attempt, was in 2nd place, eventually finishing 19th. Kubacki managed 126 m and slipped to 20th, while Kot fell to 27th after a 122.5 m jump. The last competitor of the contest was Kamil Stoch, defending his lead from the first series. He landed at 130 m, in less favourable wind conditions than Prevc. He did not receive any style mark below 19. After all adjustments, he overtook the Slovenian by 6.1 points and claimed the world championship title.

This is my second victory in Predazzo, after last year's World Cup. It's hard to describe how I feel after this success. It was an incredible day for me; I won the gold medal. I always dreamed of a world championship gold, maybe even an Olympic one – now I know dreams can come true! You just need the right motivation, effort, and hard work.

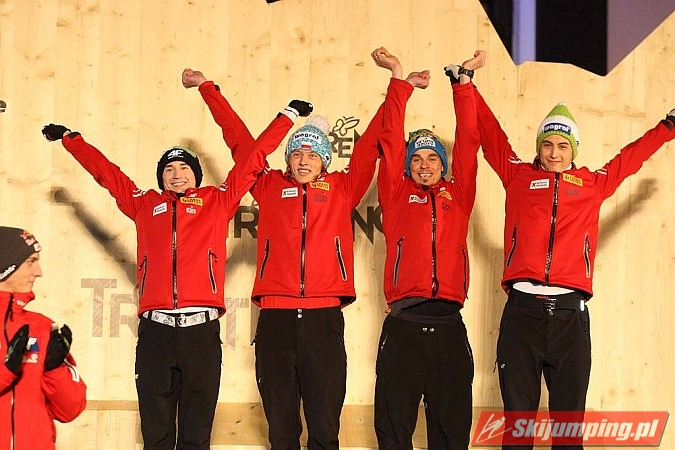
Bronze medalists in the team event

On 2 March, the team event was held. Poland competed with the lineup: Maciej Kot, Piotr Żyła, Dawid Kubacki, and Kamil Stoch. Kot's first jump measured 123 m and placed the team 5th. They held that position after Żyła's 122 m and Kubacki's 126 m. In the final group, Stoch achieved the best distance of the first round – 134 m – moving Poland up to 4th, just two points behind Norway, although initially the results incorrectly showed them five points behind Germany. In the final round, Kot managed 126 m and the position remained unchanged. After Żyła repeated that distance, Poland advanced to 3rd place. Kubacki landed two metres farther, but the team dropped back to 4th. The final jump for Poland was by Stoch, who reached 130 m from a shortened inrun, as requested by the coach. Initially, Poland was ranked 4th, 0.8 points behind Germany. However, after verification it turned out Norway's score had been miscalculated, and as a result the Polish team secured the bronze medal with a 3.7-point advantage over Norway. It was the first team medal in the history of the Polish national ski jumping team.

We believed in the medal only when it was hanging around the athletes' necks, but indeed, the scenario life prepared for us was like something from a good thriller (...) Everything worked perfectly, and as we predicted, it was very tight, with details deciding the medal positions.

==== Team event ====
Date	Event	Athlete	Round 1			Round 2			Total score	Place	Source
Date	Event	Athlete	Distance	Score	Team score	Distance	Score	Team score	Total score	Place	Source
2 March 2013	Men's team large hill	Maciej Kot	123.0 m	121.6	558.5	128.5 m	140.7	562.5	1,121.0	3.	
2 March 2013	Men's team large hill	Piotr Żyła	122.0 m	135.9	558.5	126.0 m	134.7	562.5	1,121.0	3.	
2 March 2013	Men's team large hill	Dawid Kubacki	126.0 m	138.9	558.5	128.0 m	137.3	562.5	1,121.0	3.	
2 March 2013	Men's team large hill	Kamil Stoch	134.0 m	152.1	558.5	130.0 m	149.8	562.5	1,121.0	3.	

=== Junior World Championships ===
==== Individual competition ====
Date	Event	Athlete	Round 1		Round 2		Total score	Place	Source
Date	Event	Athlete	Distance	Points	Distance	Points	Total score	Place	Source
24 January 2013	Men's individual competition (HS 100)	Klemens Murańka	101.0 m	137.0 pts	96.0 m	127.0 pts	264.0 pts	2.	
24 January 2013	Men's individual competition (HS 100)	Bartłomiej Kłusek	99.0 m	131.5 pts	96.5 m	126.5 pts	258.0 pts	4.	
24 January 2013	Men's individual competition (HS 100)	Aleksander Zniszczoł	95.5 m	122.5 pts	95.5 m	123.0 pts	245.5 pts	9.	
24 January 2013	Men's individual competition (HS 100)	Grzegorz Miętus	86.5 m	104.0 pts	NQ		104.0 pts	39.	

==== Team competition ====
Date	Event	Athlete	Round 1			Round 2			Total score	Place	Source
Date	Event	Athlete	Distance	Points	Team points	Distance	Points	Team points	Total score	Place	Source
26 January 2013	Men's team competition	Bartłomiej Kłusek	94.0 m	121.5 pts	520.0 pts	98.5 m	131.5 pts	542.0 pts	1062.0 pts	2.	
26 January 2013	Men's team competition	Krzysztof Biegun	98.0 m	130.0 pts	520.0 pts	96.5 m	127.5 pts	542.0 pts	1062.0 pts	2.	
26 January 2013	Men's team competition	Aleksander Zniszczoł	102.0 m	139.5 pts	520.0 pts	101.0 m	137.0 pts	542.0 pts	1062.0 pts	2.	
26 January 2013	Men's team competition	Klemens Murańka	97.0 m	129.0 pts	520.0 pts	105.0 m	146.0 pts	542.0 pts	1062.0 pts	2.	

=== European Youth Olympic Winter Festival ===
==== Individual competition ====
Date	Event	Athlete	Round 1		Round 2		Total score	Place	Source
Date	Event	Athlete	Distance	Points	Distance	Points	Total score	Place	Source
18 February 2013	Men's individual competition (HS 100)	Przemysław Kantyka	86.0 m	103.0 pts	84.5 m	99.5 pts	202.5 pts	23.	
18 February 2013	Men's individual competition (HS 100)	Łukasz Podżorski	83.5 m	97.0 pts	85.5 m	101.5 pts	198.5 pts	25.	
18 February 2013	Men's individual competition (HS 100)	Sebastian Okas	82.5 m	95.0 pts	NQ		95.0 pts	31.	
18 February 2013	Men's individual competition (HS 100)	Krzysztof Leja	78.5 m	85.5 pts	NQ		85.5 pts	39.	

==== Team competition ====
Date	Event	Athlete	Round 1			Round 2			Total score	Place	Source
Date	Event	Athlete	Distance	Points	Team points	Distance	Points	Team points	Total score	Place	Source
20 February 2013	Men's team competition	Sebastian Okas	82.5 m	95.0 pts	388.0 pts	NQ			388.0 pts	10.	
20 February 2013	Men's team competition	Krzysztof Leja	83.0 m	95.5 pts	388.0 pts	NQ			388.0 pts	10.	
20 February 2013	Men's team competition	Przemysław Kantyka	86.0 m	103.0 pts	388.0 pts	NQ			388.0 pts	10.	
20 February 2013	Men's team competition	Łukasz Podżorski	82.5 m	94.5 pts	388.0 pts	NQ			388.0 pts	10.	

=== Other competitions ===
On 19 and 20 January 2013, FIS Cup competitions were held on the HS-100 hill in Râșnov, Romania. Six Polish athletes participated. In the first competition, Krzysztof Leja was the highest-placed Pole, finishing 5th with jumps of 86 m and 89.5 m. Also in the top 10 were: 7th-placed Przemysław Kantyka (83.5 m and 89 m), 8th-placed Adam Ruda (84.5 m and 89 m), and 10th-placed Łukasz Podżorski (82 m and 86.5 m). Sebastian Okas took 15th place, while Michał Milczanowski finished 20th.

In the second competition, Kantyka finished on the podium in 3rd place with jumps of 91.5 m and 93 m. Podżorski was 5th (89.5 m and 93.5 m), Okas 10th (87.5 m and 92 m), Ruda 11th, Leja 14th, and Milczanowski 20th. After these competitions, Artur Kukuła remained the highest-ranked Pole in the overall FIS Cup standings (15th position), followed by Kantyka (30th position). In total, 16 Polish athletes were ranked in the standings.

== Women's competitions ==
Poland was represented by Joanna Szwab at the FIS Cup events in Râșnov on 19–20 January. In the first competition, she was classified 8th out of 9 participants with jumps of 54.5 m and 47.5 m. In the second competition, she placed 6th out of 10 with jumps of 60 m and 57 m.

On 19 February, in the women's individual competition of the 2013 European Youth Olympic Winter Festival, Joanna Szwab took 16th place with jumps of 60 m and 57 m.

=== Women's FIS Cup overall standings ===
Place	Athlete	Appearances	Points	Source
13.	Joanna Szwab	2	72	

=== European Youth Olympic Winter Festival – women's competition ===
Date	Event	Athlete	Round 1		Round 2		Total score	Place	Source
Date	Event	Athlete	Distance	Points	Distance	Points	Total score	Place	Source
19 February 2013	Women's individual competition (HS 71)	Joanna Szwab	60.0 m	99.4 pts	57.0 m	91.2 pts	190.6 pts	16.	

== Post-season ==
Kamil Stoch described the season as "sinusoidal". Maciej Kot called it the best season of his career to date. Piotr Żyła noted that the season was "tough" but expressed satisfaction with it. Łukasz Kruczek stated: "If someone had offered us such a season outcome before the winter, we would have taken it blindly".

On 27 March 2013, the Polish National Championships individual competition was held in Wisła, won by Maciej Kot, with the top 12 places taken by national team athletes. The following day, President of Poland Bronisław Komorowski met with the ski jumping team, congratulated them on their successes, and presented them with silver cufflinks featuring an eagle.

On 11 January 2014, the results of the 2013 Przegląd Sportowy Plebiscite were announced. The Polish team won the Discovery of the Year award, and Łukasz Kruczek was named Coach of the Year. Kamil Stoch took 2nd place in the competition for the best athlete award.
