= List of Polish medalists at the FIS Nordic Junior World Ski Championships =

Polish medalists at the FIS Nordic Junior World Ski Championships lists athletes representing Poland who have won at least one medal at the FIS Nordic Junior World Ski Championships.

Before the first Junior World Championships in 1977, the European Junior Nordic Ski Championships were held, where Polish athletes won six medals: three silver and three bronze. Silver medals were secured by Nordic combined skiers Jan Legierski in 1971 and 1972, and Stanisław Kawulok in 1973. Bronze medals were won by Adam Krzysztofiak in ski jumping in 1969, and Andrzej Staszel and Andrzej Zarycki in Nordic combined in 1972 and 1976, respectively. The inaugural Junior World Championships took place in 1977, and since 1979, they have been held annually.

The first Polish medalist at the Junior World Championships was Ryszard Łabaj, who won bronze in the 10 km classic cross-country race in 1992. In 2003, Justyna Kowalczyk earned a silver medal in the women's sprint. In 2004, Mateusz Rutkowski claimed Poland's first gold medal in the individual ski jumping event on the K-90 hill, with the Polish ski jumping team also securing a silver medal that year. Gold medals were also won by cross-country skiers Justyna Kowalczyk in 2006 and Sylwia Jaśkowiec in 2009, each earning two titles. In 2009, Poland achieved its best performance, winning two gold, one silver, and one bronze medal. In 2014, Jakub Wolny won gold in the individual ski jumping event, and the team of Wolny, Aleksander Zniszczoł, Krzysztof Biegun, and Klemens Murańka won gold in the team event.

Poland has won 29 medals in total: 9 gold, 14 silver, and 6 bronze. Justyna Kowalczyk is the most decorated athlete with three medals (two gold, one silver), while Murańka and Zniszczoł each have four medals (one gold, three silver).

Polish medalists at the FIS Nordic Junior World Ski Championships
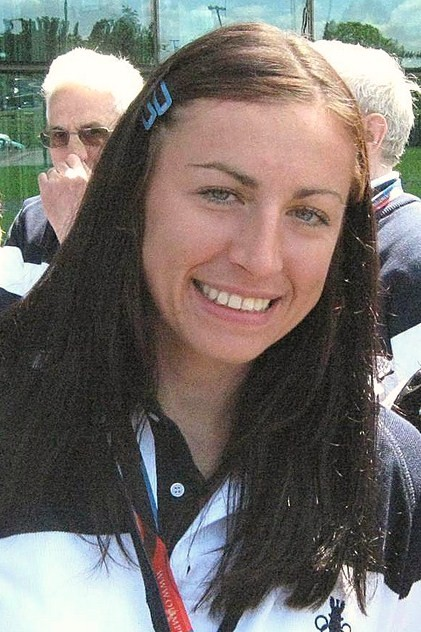
Justyna Kowalczyk – winner of two gold and one silver medal

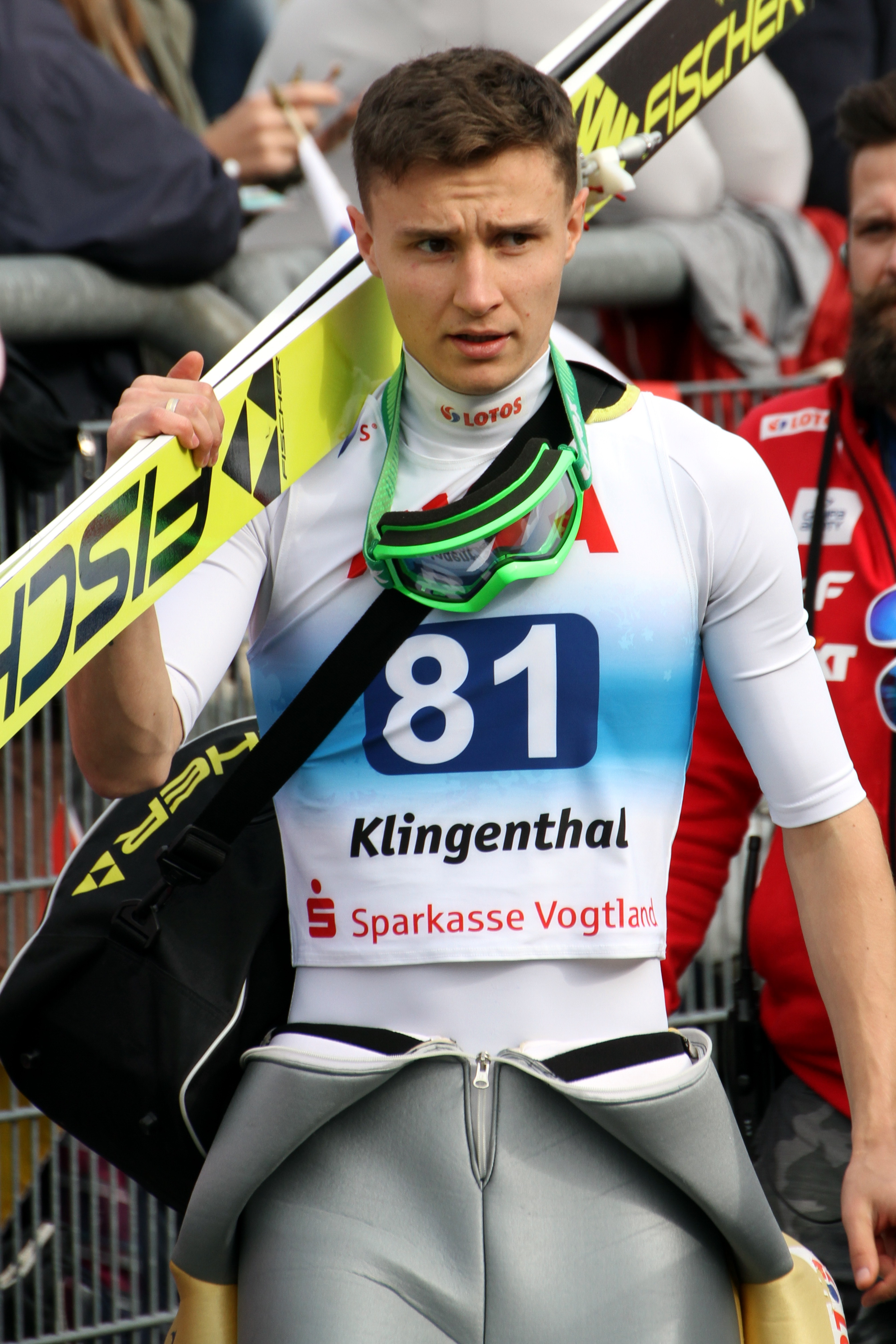
Klemens Murańka – one gold and three silver medals

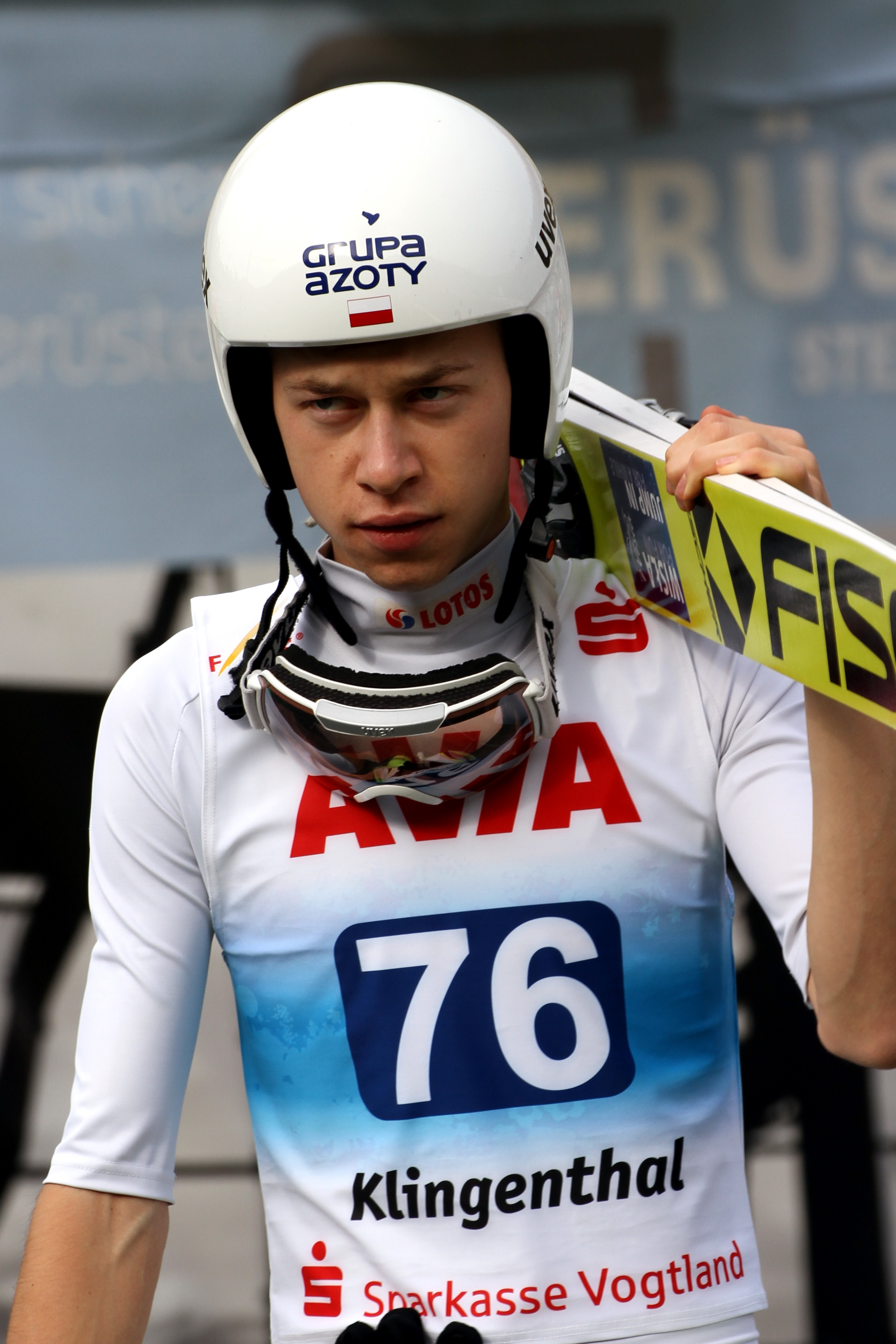
Aleksander Zniszczoł – one gold and three silver medals

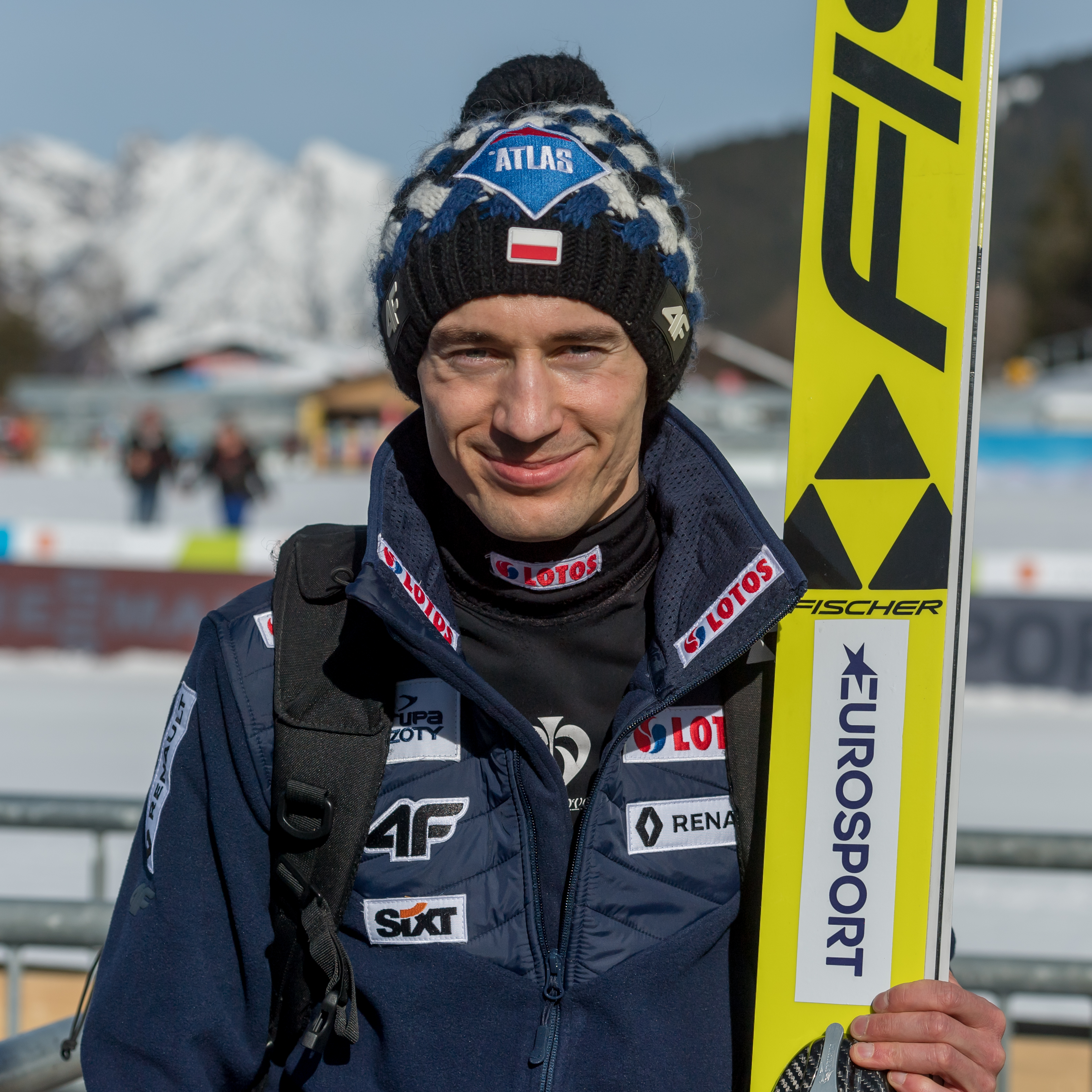
Kamil Stoch – two silver medals

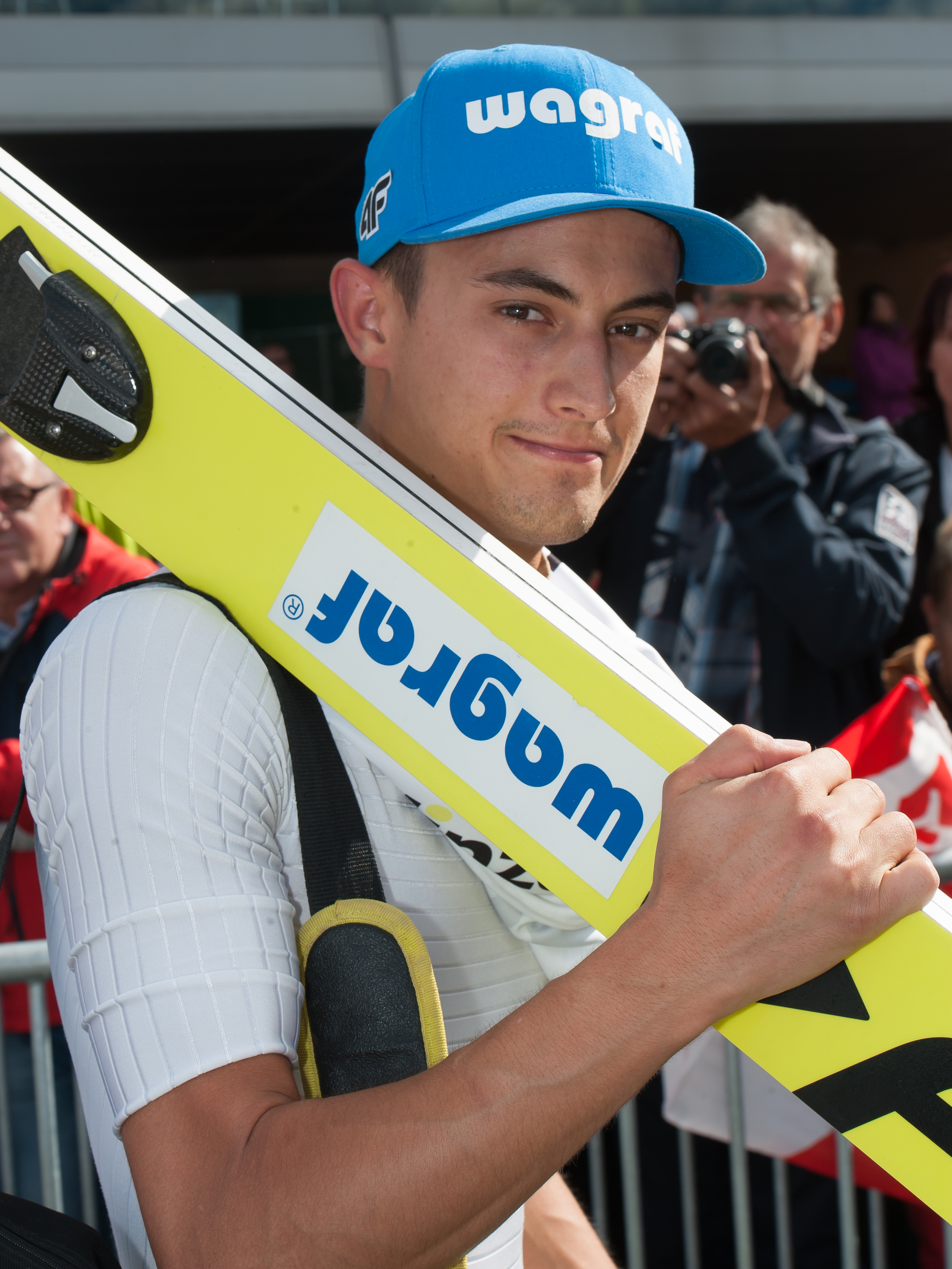
Maciej Kot – one silver and two bronze medals

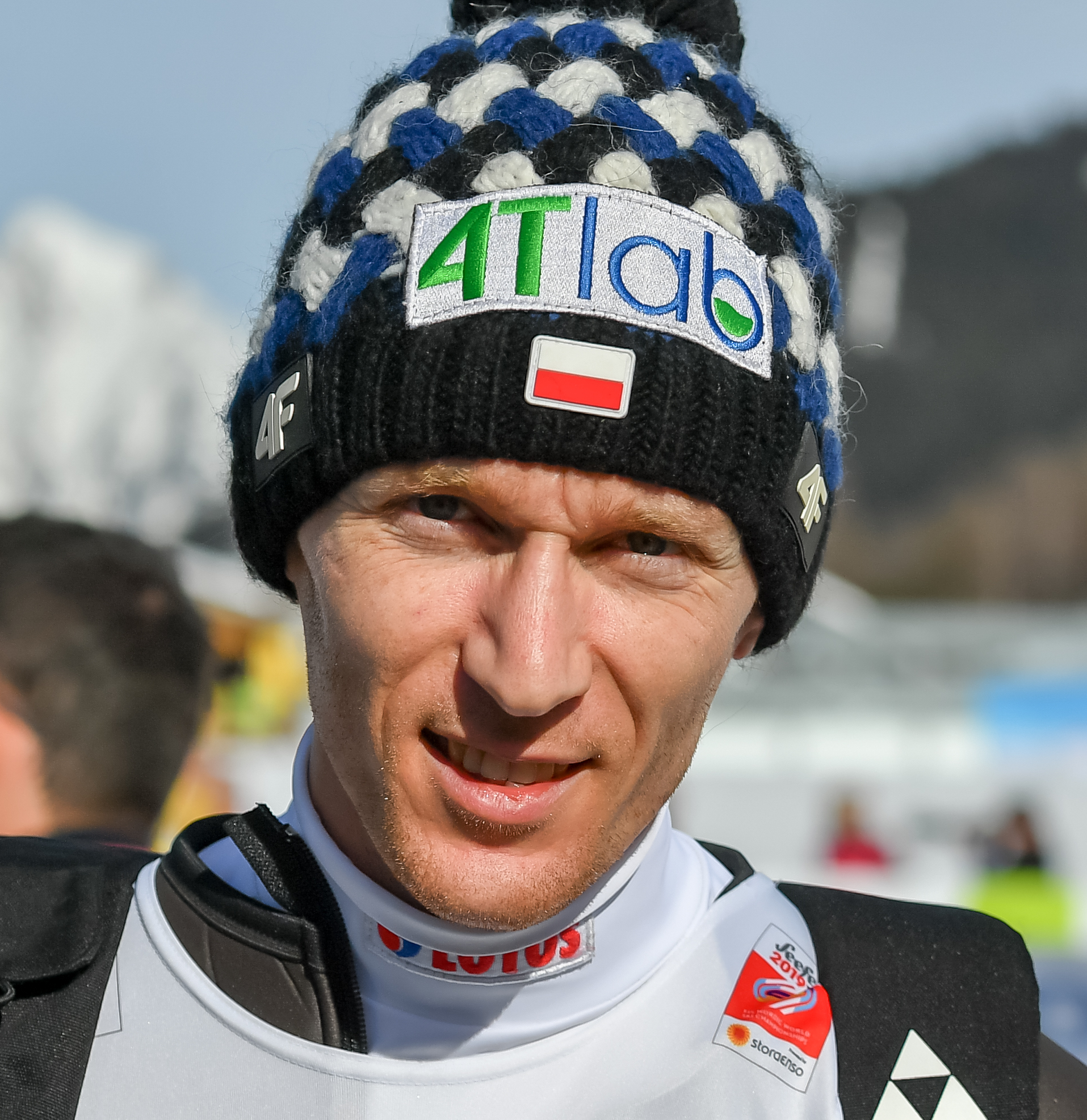
Stefan Hula – one silver medal

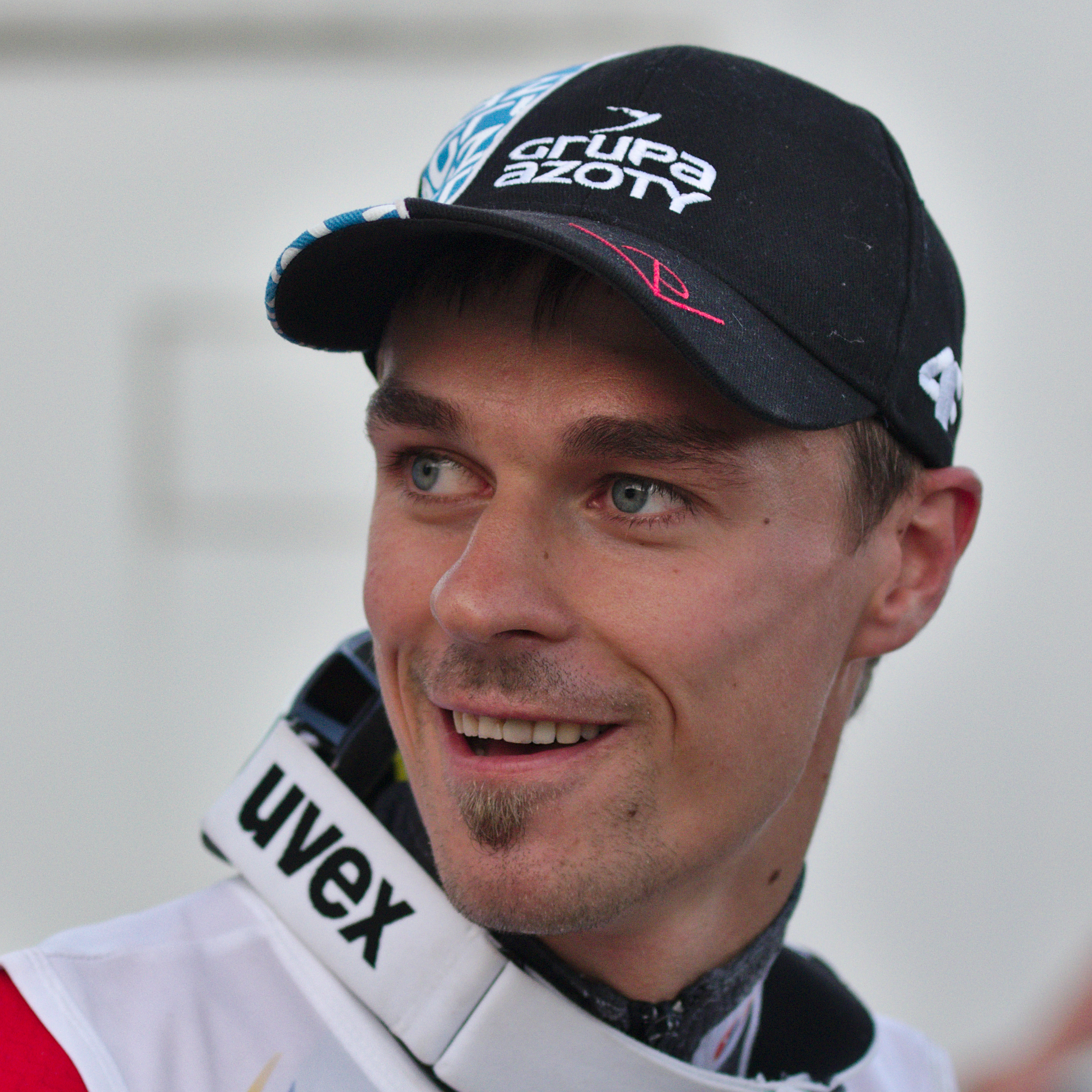
Piotr Żyła – one silver medal

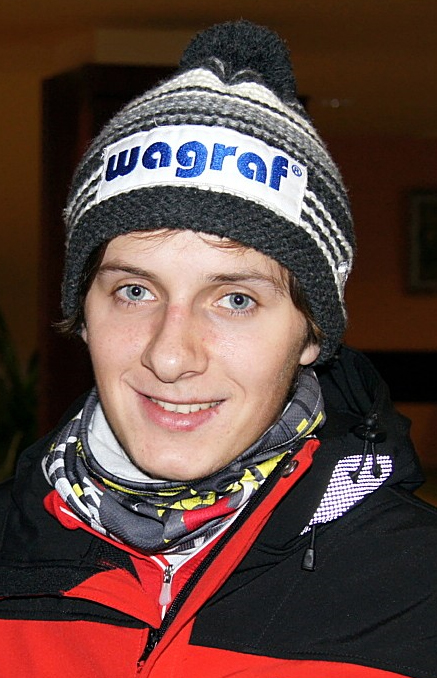
Krzysztof Miętus – one bronze medal

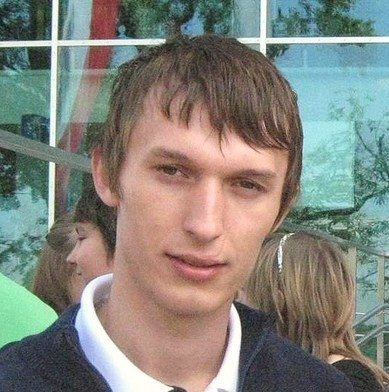
Łukasz Rutkowski – one bronze medal

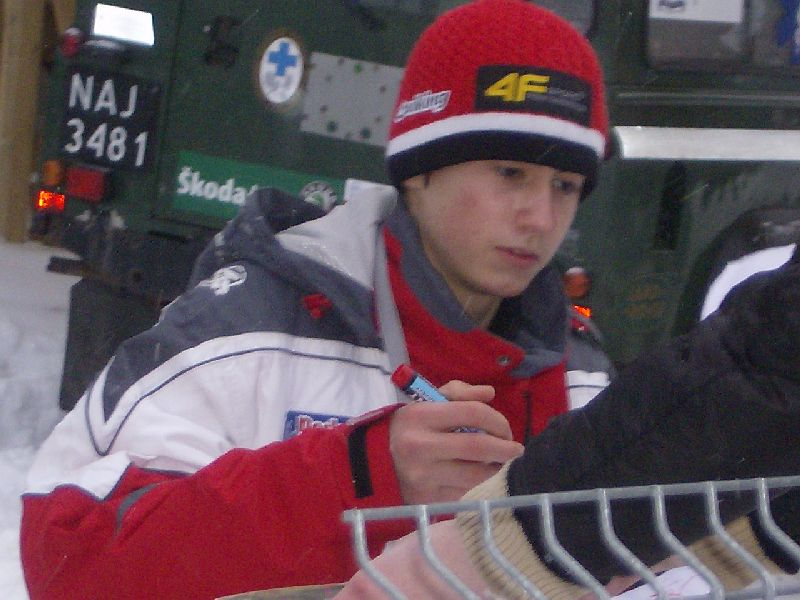
Jakub Kot – one bronze medal

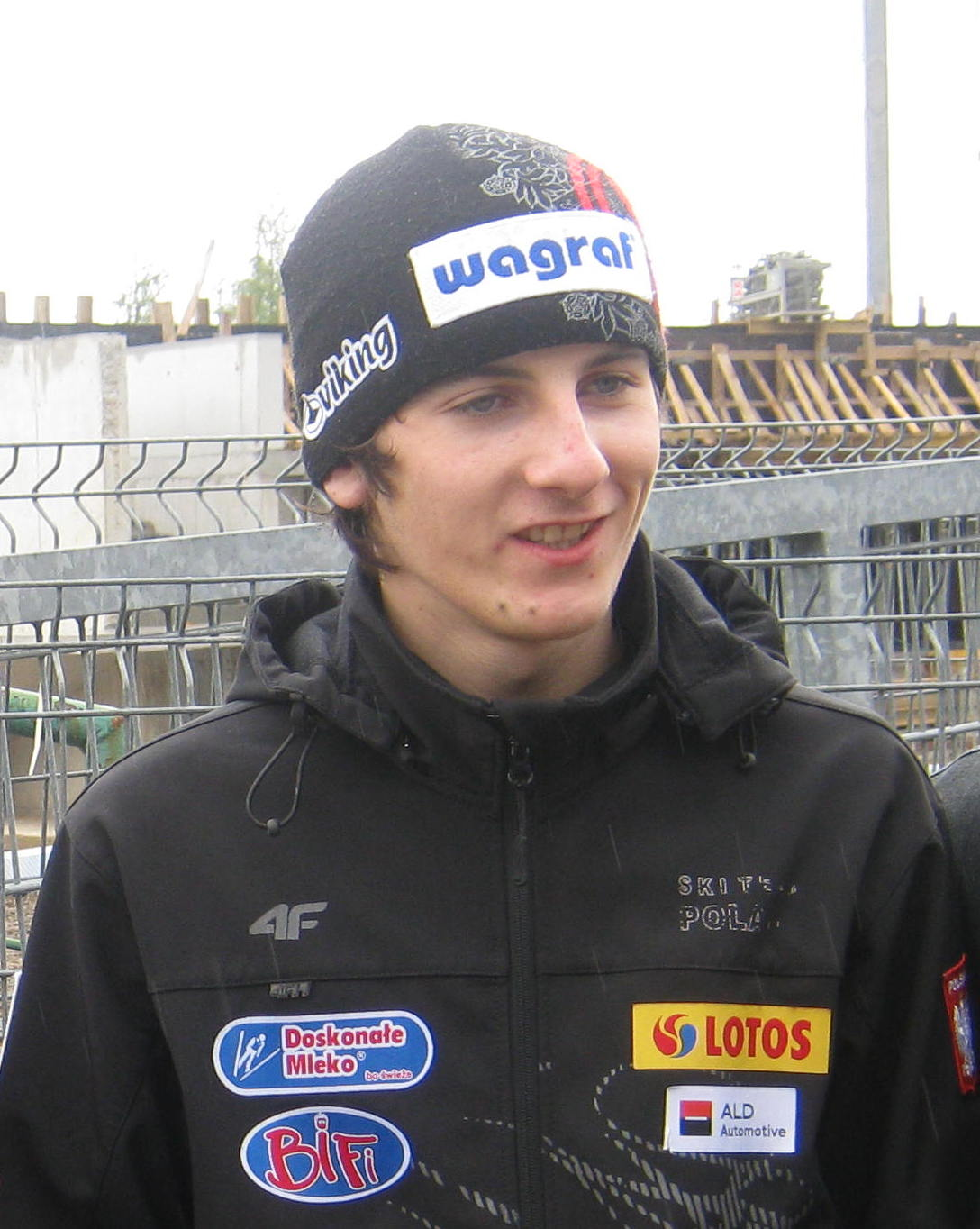
Grzegorz Miętus – one bronze medal

== Medalists by year ==
No.	Year and venue	Medal	Athlete	Discipline	Event	Source
1.	1992, Vuokatti	Bronze	Ryszard Łabaj	Cross-country skiing	10 km classic	
2.	2003, Sollefteå	Silver	Justyna Kowalczyk	Cross-country skiing	Sprint freestyle	
3.	2004, Stryn	Silver	Kamil Stoch; Dawid Kowal; Stefan Hula; Mateusz Rutkowski	Ski jumping	Team normal hill	
4.	2004, Stryn	Gold	Mateusz Rutkowski	Ski jumping	Individual normal hill	
5.	2005, Rovaniemi	Silver	Paweł Urbański; Wojciech Topór; Piotr Żyła; Kamil Stoch	Ski jumping	Team normal hill	
6.	2006, Kranj	Gold	Justyna Kowalczyk	Cross-country skiing	10 km classic	
7.	2006, Kranj	Gold	Justyna Kowalczyk	Cross-country skiing	15 km pursuit	
8.	2008, Zakopane	Bronze	Krzysztof Miętus; Maciej Kot; Dawid Kowal; Łukasz Rutkowski	Ski jumping	Team normal hill	
9.	2009, Praz de Lys-Sommand	Gold	Sylwia Jaśkowiec	Cross-country skiing	10 km freestyle	
10.	2009, Praz de Lys-Sommand	Gold	Sylwia Jaśkowiec	Cross-country skiing	15 km pursuit	
11.	2009, Štrbské Pleso	Silver	Maciej Kot	Ski jumping	Individual normal hill	
12.	2009, Štrbské Pleso	Bronze	Andrzej Zapotoczny; Jakub Kot; Grzegorz Miętus; Maciej Kot	Ski jumping	Team normal hill	
13.	2012, Erzurum	Silver	Aleksander Zniszczoł	Ski jumping	Individual normal hill	
14.	2012, Erzurum	Silver	Klemens Murańka; Tomasz Byrt; Bartłomiej Kłusek; Aleksander Zniszczoł	Ski jumping	Team normal hill	
15.	2013, Liberec	Silver	Klemens Murańka	Ski jumping	Individual normal hill	
16.	2013, Liberec	Silver	Bartłomiej Kłusek; Krzysztof Biegun; Aleksander Zniszczoł; Klemens Murańka	Ski jumping	Team normal hill	
17.	2014, Predazzo	Gold	Jakub Wolny	Ski jumping	Individual normal hill	
18.	2014, Predazzo	Gold	Jakub Wolny; Aleksander Zniszczoł; Krzysztof Biegun; Klemens Murańka	Ski jumping	Team normal hill	
19.	2019, Lahti	Silver	Monika Skinder	Cross-country skiing	Sprint classic	
20.	2020, Oberwiesenthal	Silver	Izabela Marcisz	Cross-country skiing	Sprint freestyle	
21.	2020, Oberwiesenthal	Bronze	Izabela Marcisz	Cross-country skiing	5 km classic	
22.	2020, Oberwiesenthal	Silver	Izabela Marcisz	Cross-country skiing	15 km freestyle	
23.	2021, Vuokatti	Gold	Monika Skinder	Cross-country skiing	Sprint classic	
24.	2021, Vuokatti	Bronze	Karolina Kaleta	Cross-country skiing	Sprint classic	
25.	2021, Vuokatti	Gold	Izabela Marcisz	Cross-country skiing	10 km freestyle	
26.	2022, Lygna	Silver	Monika Skinder	Cross-country skiing	Sprint freestyle	
27.	2023, Whistler	Bronze	Jan Habdas	Ski jumping	Individual normal hill	
28.	2023, Whistler	Silver	Marcin Wróbel; Klemens Joniak; Kacper Tomasiak; Jan Habdas	Ski jumping	Team normal hill	
29.	2023, Whistler	Silver	Izabela Marcisz	Cross-country skiing	10 km freestyle	

== Medalists by discipline ==
=== Cross-country skiing ===
No.	Date	Venue	Medal	Athlete	Distance	Technique	Time	Deficit	Winner	Source
1.	18 March 1992	(Finland) Vuokatti	Bronze	Ryszard Łabaj	10 km	Classic	–	–	Mathias Fredriksson	
2.	8 February 2003	(Sweden) Sollefteå	Silver	Justyna Kowalczyk	Sprint	Freestyle	–	–	Nicole Fessel	
3.	2 February 2006	(Slovenia) Kranj	Gold	Justyna Kowalczyk	10 km	Classic	28:07.0	–		
4.	4 February 2006	(Slovenia) Kranj	Gold	Justyna Kowalczyk	7.5 km + 7.5 km	Classic, freestyle	44:14.7	–		
5.	29 January 2009	(France) Praz de Lys-Sommand	Gold	Sylwia Jaśkowiec	10 km	Freestyle	28:39.1	–		
6.	31 January 2009	(France) Praz de Lys-Sommand	Gold	Sylwia Jaśkowiec	7.5 km + 7.5 km	Classic, freestyle	49:09.2	–		
7.	20 January 2019	(Finland) Lahti	Silver	Monika Skinder	Sprint	Classic			Kristine Stavås Skistad	
8.	29 February 2020	(Germany) Oberwiesenthal	Silver	Izabela Marcisz	Sprint	Freestyle			Louise Lindström	
9.	2 March 2020	(Germany) Oberwiesenthal	Bronze	Izabela Marcisz	5 km	Classic	14:17.2		Helene Marie Fossesholm	
10.	4 March 2020	(Germany) Oberwiesenthal	Silver	Izabela Marcisz	15 km	Freestyle	37:04.9		Helene Marie Fossesholm	
11.	9 February 2021	(Finland) Vuokatti	Gold	Monika Skinder	Sprint	Classic	2:33.24	–		
12.	9 February 2021	(Finland) Vuokatti	Bronze	Karolina Kaleta	Sprint	Classic	2:33.97	+0.73	Monika Skinder	
13.	12 February 2021	(Finland) Vuokatti	Gold	Izabela Marcisz	10 km	Freestyle	28:13.6	–		
14.	26 February 2022	(Norway) Lygna	Silver	Monika Skinder	Sprint	Freestyle	2:35.28	+0.49	Moa Hansson	
15.	3 February 2023	(Canada) Whistler	Silver	Izabela Marcisz	10 km	Freestyle	26:14.5	+1.5	Helen Hoffmann	

=== Ski jumping ===
No.	Date	Venue	Medal	Athlete	Hill	Jump 1	Jump 2	Score		Deficit	Winner	Source
1.	5 February 2004	(Norway) Stryn	Silver	Kamil Stoch	Normal	87.0 m	92.5 m	225.5	904.5	50.5	Austria: Roland Müller; Christoph Lenz; Nicolas Fettner; Thomas Morgenstern	
1.	5 February 2004	(Norway) Stryn	Silver	Dawid Kowal	Normal	86.0 m	87.5 m	206.5	904.5	50.5	Austria: Roland Müller; Christoph Lenz; Nicolas Fettner; Thomas Morgenstern	
1.	5 February 2004	(Norway) Stryn	Silver	Stefan Hula	Normal	83.0 m	91.0 m	214.0	904.5	50.5	Austria: Roland Müller; Christoph Lenz; Nicolas Fettner; Thomas Morgenstern	
1.	5 February 2004	(Norway) Stryn	Silver	Mateusz Rutkowski	Normal	96.0 m	97.0 m	258.5	904.5	50.5	Austria: Roland Müller; Christoph Lenz; Nicolas Fettner; Thomas Morgenstern	
2.	7 February 2004	(Norway) Stryn	Gold	Mateusz Rutkowski	Normal	104.5 m	95.5 m	273.5	–			
3.	23 March 2005	(Finland) Rovaniemi	Silver	Paweł Urbański	Normal	95.5 m	90.0 m	240.0	978.0	4.0	Slovenia: Mitja Mežnar; Matevž Šparovec; Jurij Tepeš; Nejc Frank	
3.	23 March 2005	(Finland) Rovaniemi	Silver	Wojciech Topór	Normal	92.0 m	87.0 m	223.5	978.0	4.0	Slovenia: Mitja Mežnar; Matevž Šparovec; Jurij Tepeš; Nejc Frank	
3.	23 March 2005	(Finland) Rovaniemi	Silver	Piotr Żyła	Normal	94.0 m	95.0 m	247.5	978.0	4.0	Slovenia: Mitja Mežnar; Matevž Šparovec; Jurij Tepeš; Nejc Frank	
3.	23 March 2005	(Finland) Rovaniemi	Silver	Kamil Stoch	Normal	95.5 m	101.5 m	267.0	978.0	4.0	Slovenia: Mitja Mežnar; Matevž Šparovec; Jurij Tepeš; Nejc Frank	
4.	29 February 2008	(Poland) Zakopane	Bronze	Krzysztof Miętus	Normal	82.5 m	87.5 m	226.0	942.5	28.5	Germany: Felix Schoft; Severin Freund; Pascal Bodmer; Andreas Wank	
4.	29 February 2008	(Poland) Zakopane	Bronze	Maciej Kot	Normal	86.5 m	88.5 m	240.0	942.5	28.5	Germany: Felix Schoft; Severin Freund; Pascal Bodmer; Andreas Wank	
4.	29 February 2008	(Poland) Zakopane	Bronze	Dawid Kowal	Normal	87.0 m	84.0 m	232.5	942.5	28.5	Germany: Felix Schoft; Severin Freund; Pascal Bodmer; Andreas Wank	
4.	29 February 2008	(Poland) Zakopane	Bronze	Łukasz Rutkowski	Normal	90.0 m	90.0 m	244.0	942.5	28.5	Germany: Felix Schoft; Severin Freund; Pascal Bodmer; Andreas Wank	
5.	5 February 2009	(Slovakia) Štrbské Pleso	Silver	Maciej Kot	Normal	92.5 m	96.5 m	249.0		4.0	Lukas Müller	
6.	6 February 2009	(Slovakia) Štrbské Pleso	Bronze	Andrzej Zapotoczny	Normal	91.5 m	90.5 m	230.0	937.0	44.5	Austria: Thomas Thurnbichler; Michael Hayböck; Florian SchabereiterLukas Müller	
6.	6 February 2009	(Slovakia) Štrbské Pleso	Bronze	Jakub Kot	Normal	91.0 m	92.5 m	234.5	937.0	44.5	Austria: Thomas Thurnbichler; Michael Hayböck; Florian SchabereiterLukas Müller	
6.	6 February 2009	(Slovakia) Štrbské Pleso	Bronze	Grzegorz Miętus	Normal	90.0 m	92.0 m	231.5	937.0	44.5	Austria: Thomas Thurnbichler; Michael Hayböck; Florian SchabereiterLukas Müller	
6.	6 February 2009	(Slovakia) Štrbské Pleso	Bronze	Maciej Kot	Normal	89.5 m	96.0 m	241.0	937.0	44.5	Austria: Thomas Thurnbichler; Michael Hayböck; Florian SchabereiterLukas Müller	
7.	23 February 2012	(Turkey) Erzurum	Silver	Aleksander Zniszczoł	Normal	107.5 m	109.5 m	280.5		6.0	Nejc Dežman	
8.	25 February 2012	(Turkey) Erzurum	Silver	Klemens Murańka	Normal	103.5 m	101.0 m	257.5	985.5	3.0	Norway: Espen Røe; Mats Søhagen Berggaard; Simen Key Grimsrud; Phillip Sjøen	
8.	25 February 2012	(Turkey) Erzurum	Silver	Tomasz Byrt	Normal	99.0 m	97.0 m	240.5	985.5	3.0	Norway: Espen Røe; Mats Søhagen Berggaard; Simen Key Grimsrud; Phillip Sjøen	
8.	25 February 2012	(Turkey) Erzurum	Silver	Bartłomiej Kłusek	Normal	98.0 m	95.5 m	232.0	985.5	3.0	Norway: Espen Røe; Mats Søhagen Berggaard; Simen Key Grimsrud; Phillip Sjøen	
8.	25 February 2012	(Turkey) Erzurum	Silver	Aleksander Zniszczoł	Normal	99.5 m	105.5 m	255.5	985.5	3.0	Norway: Espen Røe; Mats Søhagen Berggaard; Simen Key Grimsrud; Phillip Sjøen	
9.	24 January 2013	(Czech Republic) Liberec	Silver	Klemens Murańka	Normal	101.0 m	96.0 m	264.0		19.5	Jaka Hvala	
10.	26 January 2013	(Czech Republic) Liberec	Silver	Bartłomiej Kłusek	Normal	94.0 m	98.5 m	253.0	1,062.0	16.5	Slovenia; Anže Semenič; Ernest Prišlič; Cene Prevc; Jaka Hvala	
10.	26 January 2013	(Czech Republic) Liberec	Silver	Krzysztof Biegun	Normal	98.0 m	96.5 m	257.5	1,062.0	16.5	Slovenia; Anže Semenič; Ernest Prišlič; Cene Prevc; Jaka Hvala	
10.	26 January 2013	(Czech Republic) Liberec	Silver	Aleksander Zniszczoł	Normal	102.0 m	101.0 m	276.5	1,062.0	16.5	Slovenia; Anže Semenič; Ernest Prišlič; Cene Prevc; Jaka Hvala	
10.	26 January 2013	(Czech Republic) Liberec	Silver	Klemens Murańka	Normal	97.0 m	105.0 m	275.0	1,062.0	16.5	Slovenia; Anže Semenič; Ernest Prišlič; Cene Prevc; Jaka Hvala	
11.	31 January 2014	(Italy) Predazzo	Gold	Jakub Wolny	Normal	91.0 m	99.0 m	231.5		–		
12.	1 February 2014	(Italy) Predazzo	Gold	Jakub Wolny	Normal	98.5 m	96.5 m	264.1	1,027.0	–		
12.	1 February 2014	(Italy) Predazzo	Gold	Aleksander Zniszczoł	Normal	101.5 m	96.5 m	267.4	1,027.0	–		
12.	1 February 2014	(Italy) Predazzo	Gold	Krzysztof Biegun	Normal	92.5 m	102.0 m	255.6	1,027.0	–		
12.	1 February 2014	(Italy) Predazzo	Gold	Klemens Murańka	Normal	100.5 m	93.0 m	239.9	1,027.0	–		
13.	2 February 2023	(Canada) Whistler	Bronze	Jan Habdas	Normal	96.0 m	94.5 m	256.3		1.6	Vilho Palosaari	
14.	4 February 2023	(Canada) Whistler	Silver	Marcin Wróbel	Normal	94.0 m	92.5 m	223.7	925.8	46.7	Austria: Julijan Smid; Louis Obersteiner; Stephan Embacher; Jonas Schuster	
14.	4 February 2023	(Canada) Whistler	Silver	Klemens Joniak	Normal	98.5 m	98.5 m	240.1	925.8	46.7	Austria: Julijan Smid; Louis Obersteiner; Stephan Embacher; Jonas Schuster	
14.	4 February 2023	(Canada) Whistler	Silver	Kacper Tomasiak	Normal	99.0 m	97.0 m	240.6	925.8	46.7	Austria: Julijan Smid; Louis Obersteiner; Stephan Embacher; Jonas Schuster	
14.	4 February 2023	(Canada) Whistler	Silver	Jan Habdas	Normal	99.0 m	99.0 m	262.3	925.8	46.7	Austria: Julijan Smid; Louis Obersteiner; Stephan Embacher; Jonas Schuster	
