= Kotikova =

Kotikova may refer to:

- Feminine form of the Russian surname Kotikov
- Kotíková, feminine form of the Czech surname Kotík
