= Miętus =

Miętus, also spelled Mientus, is a Polish surname. Notable people with this surname include:

- Andy Mientus (born 1986), American actor
- Grzegorz Miętus (born 1993), Polish ski jumper
- Krzysztof Miętus (born 1991), Polish ski jumper
