= Kotik (disambiguation) =

Kotík is a Czech-language surname, while Kotik is a Russian-language surname.

Kotik may also refer to:

- Ignacy Hryniewiecki (1856-1881), Russian revolutionary, known as Kotik
- Kotik (Alexander Rybak song)
- Kotik Letaev, a 1918 novel by Andrei Bely
