= Kot =

Kot is the surname of a Polish nobility (szlachta) family. The surname derives from the nickname with the literal meaning 'cat'.

The first mention of the Polish name was in the 13th century. Adam Boniecki describes the surname in his Herbarz polski as belonging to Piława coat of arms. The Kot family uses the Doliwa, Pilawa, Rola, or Kot Morski coat of arms.

It may also be derived from the nickname "Kot" in some other Slavic languages, e.g., Czech and Russian.

Notable people with the surname include:

- Andrzej Kot (1946–2015), Polish designer
- Antoni Kot (born 1945), Polish footballer
- Aleksandra Kot (born 2000), Polish politician serving as a member of the Sejm
- Ales Kot, Czech-American comic book writer
- Antoni Kot, Polish footballer
- Eric Kot (born 1966), Hong Kong singer and actor
- Greg Kot (born 1957), American music journalist and author
- Igor Kot (born 1980), Russian footballer
- Jakub Kot (born 1990), Polish ski jumper
- Karol Kot (1946–1968), Polish serial killer
- Maciej Kot (born 1991), Polish ski jumper
- Myroslava Kot (1933–2014), Ukrainian embroider
- Natalia Kot (born 1938), Polish artistic gymnast
- Serhat Kot (born 1997), Turkish footballer
- Serhiy Kot (1958–2022), Ukrainian historian
- Stanisław Kot (1885–1975), Polish scientist and politician, member of the Polish Government in Exile
- Tomasz Kot (born 1977), Polish actor
- Wincenty Kot (c. 1395 – 1448) Archbishop of Gniezno and Primate of Poland, vice-cancellarius regni Poloniae.
