= Kotyk =

Kotyk (Ukrainian: Котик) is a gender-neutral Ukrainian surname that may refer to:

- Ken Kotyk (born 1981), Canadian bobsledder
- Seamus Kotyk (born 1980), Canadian ice hockey coach
- Valentyn Kotyk (1930–1944), Soviet Pioneer and partisan scout
- Valentyna Kotyk (born 1978), Ukrainian football player

== See also ==
- Kotik/Kotík, Russian and Czech equivalents
- Kot
