= FIS Nordic Junior World Ski Championships =

Nordic skiing event for youths

- Status: active
- Genre: sports competition
- Date: January–March
- Frequency: annual
- Location: various
- Inaugurated: 1977
- Organiser: FIS

The FIS Nordic Junior World Ski Championships is an annual Nordic skiing event organized by the International Ski Federation (FIS). The Junior World Championships was started in 1977 and was first hosted in Sainte-Croix, Switzerland. The Junior World Championship events include Nordic skiing's three disciplines: cross-country skiing, ski jumping, and Nordic combined (the latter being a combination sport consisting of both cross-country and ski jumping).

== Editions ==
Year	Location	Country	Top of the medal table	Events
FIS Nordic Junior World Ski Championships
1977	Sainte-Croix	Switzerland	East Germany	6
1979	Mont-Sainte-Anne	Canada	East Germany	6
1980	Örnsköldsvik	Sweden	Soviet Union	6
1981	Schonach	West Germany	Norway	6
1982	Murau	Austria	Norway	6
1983	Kuopio	Finland	Soviet Union	6
1984	Trondheim	Norway	Norway	7
1985	Randa / Täsch / Zermatt	Switzerland	Soviet Union	7
1986	Lake Placid	United States	Soviet Union	10
1987	Asiago	Italy	Soviet Union	10
1988	Saalfelden	Austria	Soviet Union	10
1989	Vang / Hamar	Norway	Soviet Union	10
1990	Les Saisies / Štrbské Pleso	France / Czechoslovakia	Soviet Union	10
1991	Reit im Winkl	Germany	Norway	10
1992	Vuokatti	Finland	Finland	10
1993	Harrachov	Czech Republic	Norway	10
1994	Breitenwang	Austria	Russia	10
1995	Gällivare	Sweden	Russia	10
1996	Asiago	Italy	Russia	10
1997	Canmore	Canada	Estonia	10
1998	St. Moritz / Pontresina	Switzerland	Finland	10
1999	Saalfelden	Austria	Finland	10
2000	Štrbské Pleso	Slovakia	Russia	12 (Note: The individual ski jumping event was cancelled due to weather conditions.)
2001	Karpacz	Poland	Finland	13
2002	Schonach	Germany	Germany	10 (Note: Women's cross-country 4×5 km relay, men's cross-country 4×10 km relay and the Nordic combined team event were cancelled due to weather conditions.)
2003	Sollefteå	Sweden	Russia	13
2004	Stryn	Norway	Russia	13
2005	Rovaniemi	Finland	Norway	13
FIS Nordic Junior and U23 World Ski Championships
2006	Kranj	Slovenia	Norway	20
2007	Planica (sj & nc) / Tarvisio (cc)	Slovenia / Italy	Norway	20
2008	Zakopane (sj & nc) / Mals (cc)	Poland / Italy	Germany	20
2009	Štrbské Pleso (sj & nc) / Praz de Lys-Sommand (cc)	Slovakia / France	Norway	20
2010	Hinterzarten	Germany	Norway	20
2011	Otepää	Estonia	Norway	19 (Note: Nordic combined team event cancelled.)
2012	Erzurum	Turkey	Russia	21
2013	Liberec	Czech Republic	Germany	21
2014	Val di Fiemme	Italy	Austria	21
2015	Almaty	Kazakhstan	Norway	21
2016	Râșnov	Romania	Norway	21
2017	Park City	United States	Russia	22
2018	Kandersteg (sj & nc) / Goms (cc)	Switzerland	Norway	22
2019	Lahti	Finland	Russia	23
2020	Oberwiesenthal	Germany	Norway	24
2021	Lahti / Vuokatti	Finland	Norway	20
2022	Zakopane (sj & nc) / Lygna (cc)	Poland / Norway	Russia	22
2023	Whistler	Canada	Norway	23
2024	Planica	Slovenia	Norway	24
2025	Lake Placid (sj & nc) / Schilpario (cc)	United States / Italy	Norway	24
2026	Lillehammer	Norway	Norway	24
2027	Otepää	Estonia		
2028	Falun	Sweden		

Notes:

- 1984: First with Nordic combined team event
- 1986: First with 30 km (men) and 15 km (women) in cross-country skiing / First with ski jumping team event
- 2000: First with a sprint in cross-country skiing / First with sprint (5 km) in Nordic combined
- 2006: First with ski jumping for women / First with under-23 events
- 2008: Originally scheduled in Szczyrk and Wisła
- 2016: First with the mixed team in ski jumping
- 2019: Originally scheduled in Vuokatti / First with Nordic combined for women
- 2021: Originally scheduled in Szczyrk, Wisła and Zakopane
- 2022: Originally scheduled in 2021
- 2026: Originally scheduled in Trondheim

== Multiple winners ==
=== Cross-country skiing ===
==== Men ====
Rank	Athlete	Country	From	To	Gold	Silver	Bronze	Total
1	Petter Northug	Norway	2005	2006	6	2	–	8
2	Gennady Lazutin	Soviet Union	1984	1986	6	–	–	6
3	Petr Sedov	Russia	2008	2010	5	2	1	8
4	Sergey Ustiugov	Russia	2011	2012	5	1	–	6
5	Alexey Chervotkin	Russia	2013	2015	4	1	2	7
6	Mathias Fredriksson	Sweden	1992	1993	4	1	1	6
7	German Karachevsky	Soviet Union	1987	1988	4	–	–	4
7	Dmitriy Rostovtsev	Russia	2012	2013	4	–	–	4
9	Bruno Carrara	Italy	1995	1997	3	1	1	5
10	Thomas Alsgaard	Norway	1991	1992	3	1	–	4
10	Jon Rolf Skamo Hope	Norway	2017	2018	3	1	–	4

==== Women ====
Rank	Athlete	Country	From	To	Gold	Silver	Bronze	Total
1	Ingvild Flugstad Østberg	Norway	2008	2010	7	3	–	10
2	Yuliya Chepalova	Russia	1993	1996	6	1	1	8
3	Pirjo Muranen	Finland	1998	2001	5	4	1	10
4	Astrid Uhrenholdt Jacobsen	Norway	2005	2007	5	1	1	7
5	Milla Grosberghaugen Andreassen	Norway	2023	2025	4	2	2	8
6	Lina Andersson	Sweden	1998	2001	4	1	1	6
7	Gabriele Hess	East Germany/Germany	1988	1991	4	1	–	5
8	Irina Khazova	Russia	2003	2004	4	–	1	5
9	Charlotte Kalla	Sweden	2006	2007	3	3	1	7
10	Victoria Carl	Germany	2013	2015	3	2	2	7

=== Nordic combined ===
==== Men ====
Rank	Athlete	Country	From	To	Gold	Silver	Bronze	Total
1	Björn Kircheisen	Germany	2001	2003	6	–	–	6
2	Petter Tande	Norway	2002	2005	5	1	3	9
3	Trond Einar Elden	Norway	1988	1990	5	–	–	5
4	Halldor Skard	Norway	1990	1993	4	1	–	5
5	Bernhard Flaschberger	Austria	2014	2016	4	–	–	4
6	Hannu Manninen	Finland	1994	1998	3	2	–	5
7	Manuel Faißt	Germany	2012	2013	3	1	1	5
8	Tom Beetz	Germany	2005	2006	3	1	–	4
8	Florian Dagn	Austria	2016	2019	3	1	–	4
10	Alessandro Pittin	Italy	2008	2009	3	–	1	4

==== Women ====
Rank	Athlete	Country	From	To	Gold	Silver	Bronze	Total
1	Gyda Westvold Hansen	Norway	2019	2021	3	2	–	5
2	Jenny Nowak	Germany	2020	2020	1	1	–	2
3	Ayane Miyazaki	Japan	2019	2020	1	–	1	2
4	Marte Leinan Lund	Norway	2020	2021	2	1	–	3
5	Maria Gerboth	Germany	2020	2020	–	1	–	1
6	Anja Nakamura	Japan	2019	2019	–	–	2	2
7	Lisa Hirner	Austria	2020	2021	–	1	2	3

=== Ski jumping ===
==== Men ====
Rank	Athlete	Country	From	To	Gold	Silver	Bronze	Total
1	Heinz Kuttin	Austria	1988	1990	5	–	–	5
2	Janne Ahonen	Finland	1993	1994	4	–	–	4
2	Michael Hayböck	Austria	2009	2011	4	–	–	4
4	Thomas Morgenstern	Austria	2003	2004	3	1	–	4
5	Lukas Müller	Austria	2009	2012	3	–	1	4
6	Janne Happonen	Finland	2001	2002	3	–	–	3
6	Olli Happonen	Finland	1992	1994	3	–	–	3
6	Michael Uhrmann	Germany	1995	1996	3	–	–	3
9	Jurij Tepeš	Slovenia	2005	2007	2	2	1	5
10	Stefan Kaiser	Austria	1999	2001	2	1	2	5

==== Women ====
Rank	Athlete	Country	From	To	Gold	Silver	Bronze	Total
1	Sara Takanashi	Japan	2012	2014	5	–	–	5
2	Ema Klinec	Slovenia	2012	2018	4	3	1	8
3	Nika Križnar	Slovenia	2016	2018	4	1	1	6
4	Marita Kramer	Austria	2019	2020	3	–	1	4
5	Anna Shpyneva	Russia	2019	2019	3	–	–	3
6	Gianina Ernst	Germany	2015	2018	2	2	–	4
7	Lidiia Iakovleva	Russia	2018	2019	2	2	–	4
8	Pauline Heßler	Germany	2013	2017	2	–	1	3
8	Yūki Itō	Japan	2011	2014	2	–	1	3
8	Yurina Yamada	Japan	2012	2015	2	–	1	3
8	Lisa Eder	Austria	2019	2020	2	–	1	3

== See also ==
- FIS Nordic World Ski Championships
- List of Polish medalists at the FIS Nordic Junior World Ski Championships
