= Kotikov =

Kotikov, feminine Kotikova is a Russian surname. Ukrainian aquivalent: Kotykov/Kotykova, Belarusian: Kotsikau/Kotsikava. Notable people with the surname include:

- Aleksandr Kotikov (1902-1981), Soviet major general
- Anna Kotikova, Russian volleyball player
- Ivan Kotikov (1865-1920), Russian major general
- Mikhail Kotikov (1897-1981), Soviet major general

== See also ==
- Kotik
