= Antoni Kot =

Polish footballer (born 1945)

Personal information
- Date of birth: 26 March 1945 (age 81)
- Height: 1.78 m (5 ft 10 in)
- Position: Defender

Senior career*
Years	Team	Apps	(Gls)
1962–1978	Odra Opole		
1978–1983	Slagelse B&I		

International career
- Poland U18
1971	Poland	1	(0)

Managerial career
- 1984–1985: Odra Opole
- 1986–1987: Odra Opole
Medal record
Men's football
Representing Poland
UEFA European Under-18 Championship
Third place	1978 Poland
- * Club domestic league appearances and goals

Antoni Kot (born 26 March 1945) is a Polish former footballer who played as a defender. He played in one match for the Poland national football team in 1971. Besides Poland, he played in Denmark.

== Honours ==
Odra Opole

- Polish League Cup: 1977

Poland U18

- UEFA European Under-18 Championship third place: 1978
