= Zbigniew Klimowski =

Polish ski jumper

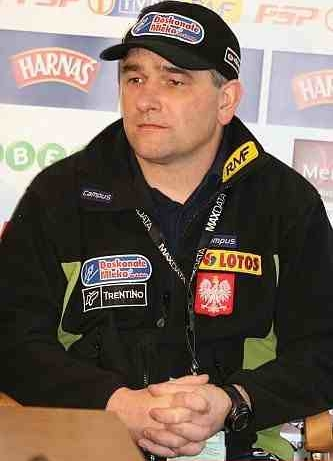
- Zbigniew Klimowski in 2007

Personal information
- Nationality: Polish
- Born: 18 January 1967 (age 59) Nowy Targ, Poland

Sport
- Sport: Ski jumping

Zbigniew Klimowski (born 18 January 1967) is a Polish ski jumper. He competed in the large hill event at the 1992 Winter Olympics.
