= Jakub Kot =

Polish ski jumper

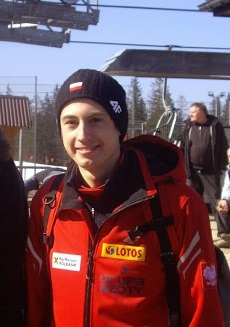

Personal information
- Full name: Jakub Kot
- Nationality: Poland
- Born: 19 January 1990 (age 36) Limanowa, Poland

Sport
- Sport: Skiing
- Club: AZS Zakopane

World Cup career
- Seasons: 2009–2017
- Indiv. starts: 4

Achievements and titles
- Personal bests: 182.5 m (599 ft); Oberstdorf, 29 Jan 2010
Medal record
Men's ski jumping
Representing Poland
Universiade
Bronze medal – third place	2011 Erzurum	Team NH
Bronze medal – third place	2013 Osrblie	Team NH
World Junior Championship
Bronze medal – third place	2009 Štrbské Pleso	Team NH
- Updated on 13 December 2016

Jakub Kot (born 19 January 1990) is a Polish former ski jumper, and a member of the Polish youth ski jumping team.

== Personal life ==
Kot was born in Limanowa, Poland, but raised in Zakopane. His father Rafał was a physiotherapist for the Polish ski jumping team. Jakub's younger brother, Maciej, is also a ski jumper. On 22 October 2016 in Zakopane, he married Joanna Pilch. They have two daughters, born in 2017 and 2018.

== Career ==
He was part of the youth team of Poland. He debuted in the Continental Cup in the season 2007/2008. He competed at the World Junior Championships 2009 in Štrbské Pleso, where the individual was 20th and won a bronze medal in the normal hill with Polish team – Maciej Kot, Grzegorz Miętus and Andrzej Zapotoczny. On 26 March 2013 he won the Polish Championship with the team AZS Zakopane – Krzysztof Miętus, Grzegorz Miętus and his brother Maciej Kot.
