= Myroslava Kot =

Ukrainian artist (1933–2014)

- Myroslava Kot in 2007
- Born: Myroslava Buha; 5 October 1933; Warsaw, Poland
- Died: 29 December 2014 (aged 81); Drohobych, Lviv Oblast, Ukraine
- Known for: Embroidery
- Awards: Merited Master of Folk Arts of Ukraine (1995)
- Website: myroslava-kot.org/en/

Myroslava Petrivna Kot (née Buha; 5 October 1933 in Warsaw, Poland – 29 December 2014 in Drohobych, Ukraine) was a Ukrainian embroiderer. From 1991, she was the head of the Department of Methodology and History of Ukrainian Decorative and Applied Arts at the Teachers’ Training College in Drohobych. She was awarded Master of Folk Crafts of Ukraine in 1995, and an Honorary Citizen of Drohobych in 2012.

Myroslava Kot studied Ukrainian embroidery paying particular attention to Drohobych patterns. Her works have been exhibited in Ukraine, Canada and the United States. 19 of her students became Ukraine People’s Masters of Decorative and Applied Arts.

== Selected publications ==
- Кот, Мирослава (1999). Вишивка Дрогобиччини. Традиції та сучасність. ІН НАНУ. ISBN 966-02-1334-4.
- Кот, Мирослава (2007). Українська вишита сорочка - традиції та сучасність. OCLC 210178875.
