= Kotik =

Kotik is a Russian-language surname. Kotík is a Czech surname, with feminine form Kotíková. The Ukrainian equivalent is Kotyk. Notable people with the surname include:

- Artyom Kotik (born 2001), Russian footballer
- Jan Kotík (1916–2002), Czech artist
- Jan Jakub Kotík (1972–2007), Czech artist, son of Petr, grandson of Jan
- Nick Kotik (born 1950), American politician
- Petr Kotik (born 1942), Czech composer, son of Jan
- Yechezkel Kotik (1847–1921), Yiddish writer

== See also ==
- Kot, a Polish surname
- Kotov, a Russian surname
- Kotikova
