= Tomasz Byrt =

Polish ski jumper

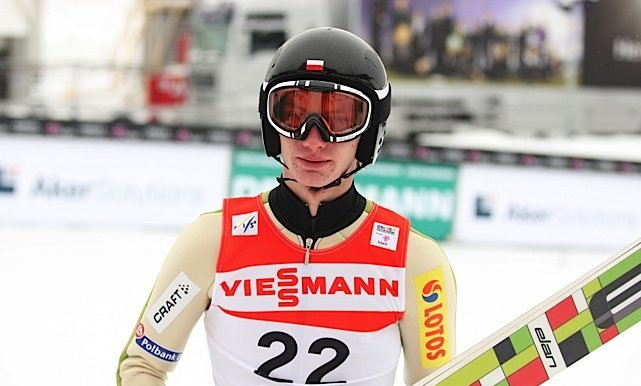

Personal information
- Full name: Tomasz Byrt
- Born: 25 January 1993 (age 33) Cieszyn, Poland

Sport
- Sport: Skiing
- Club: KS Wisła

World Cup career
- Seasons: 2011–2012
- Indiv. podiums: 1 Team
- Updated on 30 Mar 2015

Tomasz Byrt (born 25 January 1993) is a Polish ski jumper.

== History ==
He stood on the podium at a World Cup event in Lahti at 18 and won a silver medal at the Junior World Championships the following year. Despite these early achievements, Byrt's career faced setbacks, leading to his exclusion from the national team. Post his ski jumping career, Byrt transitioned to working as a delivery driver for a pizzeria in Wisła. He also focuses on his role as a father.
