= Krzysztof Miętus =

Polish ski jumper

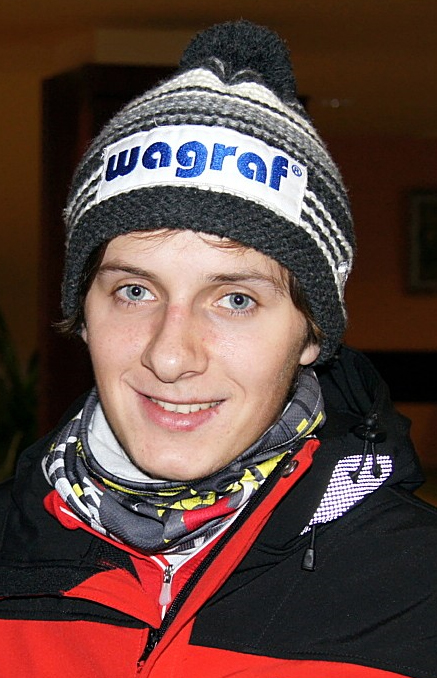

Personal information
- Full name: Krzysztof Miętus
- Nationality: Poland
- Born: 8 March 1991 (age 35) Zakopane, Poland
- Height: 1.72 m (5 ft 8 in)

Sport
- Sport: Skiing
- Club: AZS Zakopane

World Cup career
- Seasons: 2008–2018
- Indiv. starts: 60

Achievements and titles
- Personal bests: 210 m (690 ft); Vikersund, 23 Feb 2012
Medal record
Men's ski jumping
World Junior Championship
Bronze medal – third place	2008 Zakopane	Team NH
- Updated on 13 December 2016

Krzysztof Miętus ([ˈkʂɨʂtɔf ˈmjɛntus]; born 8 March 1991) is a Polish ski jumper, who has competed since 2008. He is a member of Polish youth team and participated in the Winter Olympics in Vancouver 2010.

== Personal life ==
Krzysztof Miętus was born in Zakopane, Poland, but he lives in Dzianisz, Poland. His younger brother, Grzegorz, was also a ski jumper.

== Career ==
One of his major achievements was the third place in winter Polish Championship in Zakopane in 2007, and the silver medal in summer Polish Championships in 2011. At the World Junior Championship took third place in team competition in Zakopane together with Maciej Kot, Łukasz Rutkowski and Dawid Kowal. In 2011, he won the qualification for the Lotos Poland Tour competition in Zakopane. He took part in World Junior Championships in Tarvisio (2007), Zakopane (2008), Hinterzarten (2010) and the Estonian Otepää (2011). At the 2010 Winter Olympics, he finished 36th both in the individual large and normal hill events. Miętus's best World Cup finish was fifth in the team large hill event at Finland in 2009.

== Olympic Games ==
Krzysztof Miętus started at Olympic Games once – in Vancouver 2010. He was 36th on normal and large hills.

=== Individual ===
2010 (Canada) Vancouver/Whistler	–	36th place (K-95), 36th place (K-125)

=== Krzysztof Miętus's starts at Olympic Games ===
Place	Day	Year	Locality	Hill	Point K	HS	Competition	Jump 1	Jump 2	Note (points)	Loss (points)	Winner
36.	February 13	2010	(Canada) Whistler	Whistler Olympic Park	K-95	HS-106	individual	94.0 m	-	109.0	167.5	Simon Ammann
36.	February 20	2010	(Canada) Whistler	Whistler Olympic Park	K-125	HS-140	individual	111.5 m	-	84.7	198.9	Simon Ammann
