= Łukasz Rutkowski =

Polish ski jumper

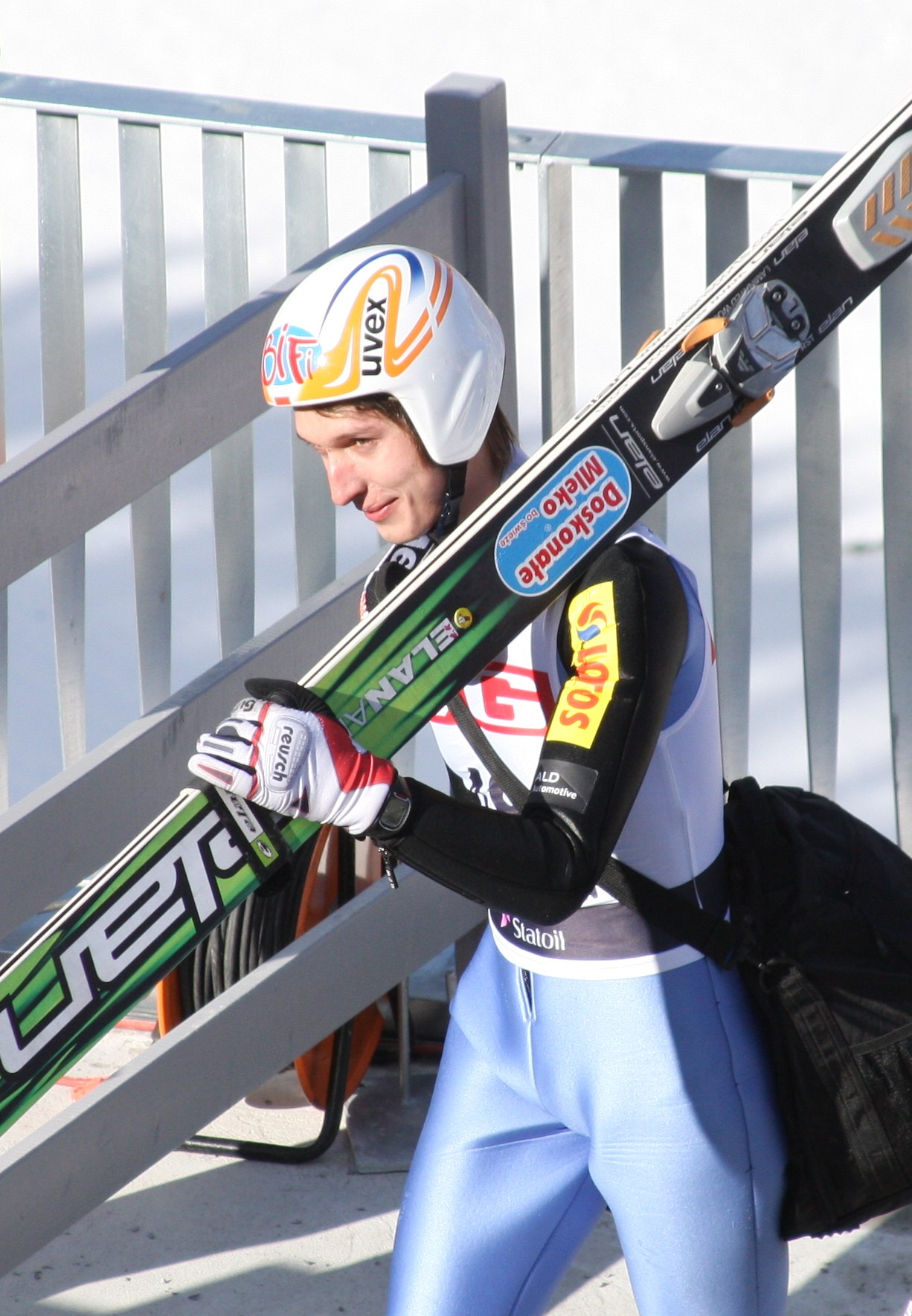

Personal information
- Born: January 22, 1988 (age 38) Zakopane, Poland

Sport
- Sport: Skiing
- Club: TS Wisła Zakopane

World Cup career
- Seasons: 2006-2018

Achievements and titles
- Personal bests: 203,5 m (Tauplitz, 2010)
Medal record
Representing Poland
World Junior Championship
| Bronze medal – third place | 2008 Zakopane | Team NH |
- Updated on 22 February 2014

Łukasz Rutkowski (born 22 January 1988 in Zakopane) is a Polish former ski jumper.

== Personal life ==
Łukasz Rutkowski was born in Zakopane, Poland. He had an older brother Mateusz (1986–2024), who was also a ski jumper.

In 2017, along with his brother Mateusz, he founded the Rutkow-Ski Sports Club that is dedicated to training children and youth.

== Career ==
He made his Continental Cup debut in February 2006, his best result being a sixth place from Vikersund in March 2008. He also finished seventh in the normal hill at both the 2006 and 2008 Junior World Championships; at the latter event he also won a bronze medal in the team competition. He made his World Cup debut in January 2008 in Zakopane, and collected his first World Cup points with a 27th place in December 2008 in Engelberg. His best result is a 24th place in January 2009 in Zakopane. At the FIS Nordic World Ski Championships 2009 in Liberec, he finished fourth in the team large hill event. Rutkowski finished sixth in the team large hill event at the 2010 Winter Olympics in Vancouver.
