= Grzegorz Miętus =

Polish ski jumper (1993–2026)

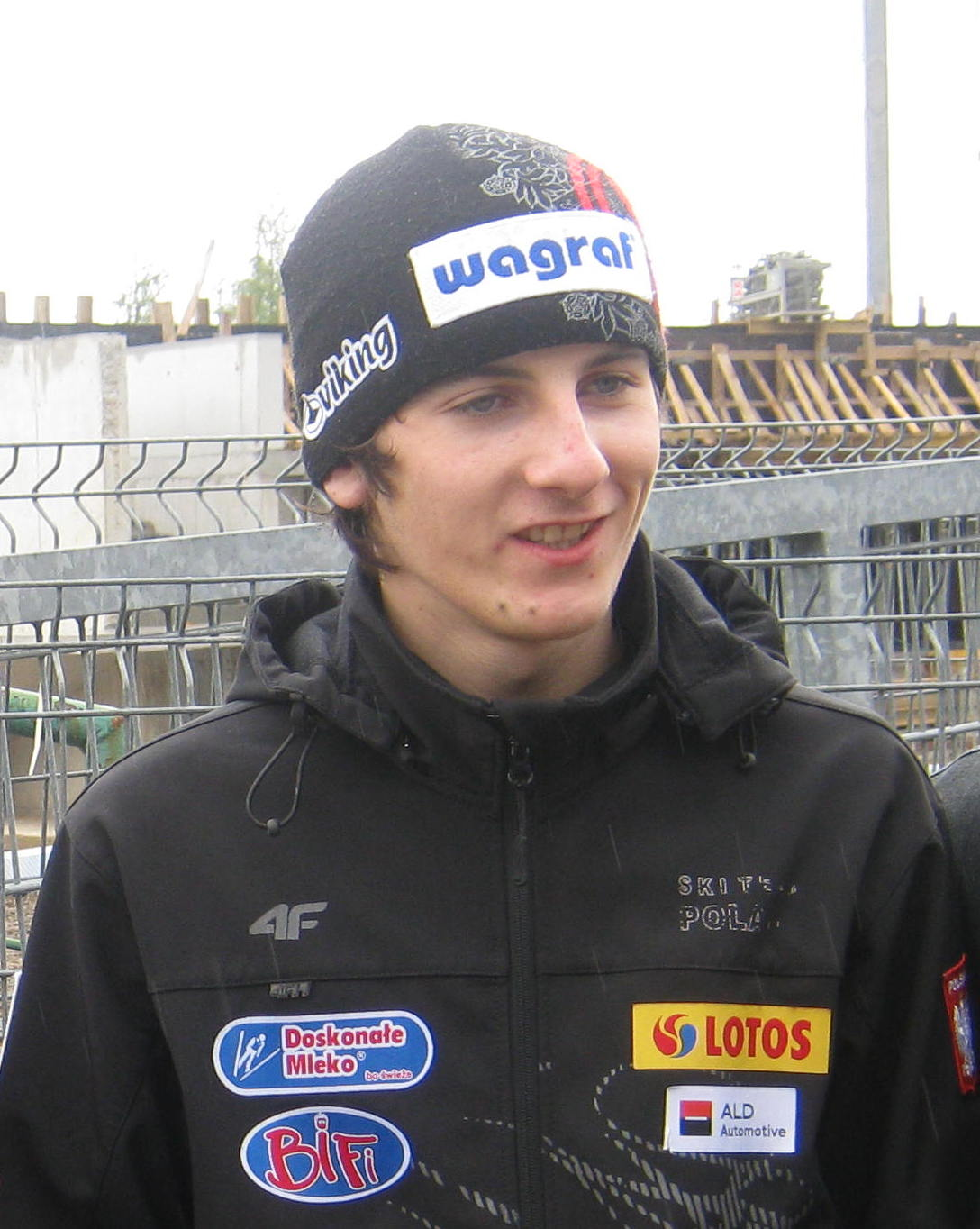
- Miętus in 2010

Personal information
- Nationality: Poland
- Born: 20 February 1993 Zakopane, Poland
- Died: 4 July 2026 (aged 33)

Sport
- Sport: Skiing
- Club: AZS Zakopane

World Cup career
- Seasons: 2007–2016
- Indiv. starts: 4

Achievements and titles
- Personal bests: 137.5 m (451 ft); Klingenthal, 3 October 2009
Medal record
Men's ski jumping
Representing Poland
World Junior Championship
| Bronze medal – third place | 2009 Štrbské Pleso | Team NH |

Grzegorz Miętus ([ˈɡʐɛɡɔʐ ˈmjɛntus]; 20 February 1993 – 4 July 2026) was a Polish ski jumper.

== Background ==
Grzegorz Miętus was born on 20 February 1993 in Zakopane, Poland, but lived in Dzianisz.

His elder brother, Krzysztof Miętus, competed in ski jumping at the 2010 Winter Olympics.

== Career ==
On 2 February 2008, he debuted in the Continental Cup in Zakopane on large hill, where he placed 43rd. He competed at the World Junior Championships 2009 in Štrbské Pleso, where he finished 20th and won a bronze medal in the normal hill with Polish team, alongside Maciej Kot, Jakub Kot, and Andrzej Zapotoczny. On 20 December 2009, he won a first Continental Cup competition in Otepää. He debuted in the Ski Jumping World Cup on 22 January 2010, in Zakopane, where he finished 48th and 47th. On 3 February 2010, he won his first points in World Cup competition in Klingenthal, where he placed 22nd.

After retiring from ski jumping, he became a coach focusing on mentoring young ski jumpers.

== Death ==
Miętus died on 4 July 2026 in Zakopane. The cause of his death has not been made public. He had been reported missing days prior.

He is survived by his wife and two sons.
