= 2012–13 FIS Ski Jumping Continental Cup =

Ski-jumping competition series

FIS Ski Jumping Continental Cup 2012/13
Discipline	Men	Women
Summer	(Czech Republic) Jan Matura	(Austria) Daniela Iraschko (Austria) Jacqueline Seifriedsberger
Winter	(Slovenia) Anže Semenič	(Russia) Irina Avvakumova

Competition
Edition	11th (Summer), 22nd (Winter)	5th (Summer), 9th (Winter)
Locations	7 (Summer), 13 (Winter)	1 (Summer), 2 (Winter)
Individual	14 (Summer), 27 (Winter)	2 (Summer), 4 (Winter)
Cancelled	— (Summer), 3 (Winter)	— (Summer), 3 (Winter)
Rescheduled	— (Summer), 9 (Winter)	— (Summer), — (Winter)

The 2012/13 FIS Ski Jumping Continental Cup was the 22nd in a row (20th official) Continental Cup winter season and the 11th official summer season in ski jumping for men.

This was also the 9th winter and the 5th summer season for women. Coline Mattel won summer and Daniela Iraschko winter overall.

Other competitions this season were World Cup and Grand Prix.

== Men's Summer ==
Individual men's events in the CC history

Total	F	L	N	Winners
119	—	58	61

after large hill event in Klingenthal (23 September 2012)

=== Calendar ===
All	No.	Date	Place (Hill)	Size	Winner	Second	Third	Overall leader	R.
106	1	30 June 2012	(Austria) Stams (Brunnentalschanze HS115)	L _{047}	(Canada) M. Boyd-Clowes	(Poland) Dawid Kubacki	(Austria) Wolfgang Loitzl	(Canada) M. Boyd-Clowes	
107	2	1 July 2012	(Austria) Stams (Brunnentalschanze HS115)	L _{048}	(Austria) Lukas Müller	(Norway) Anders Jacobsen	(Poland) Dawid Kubacki	(Poland) Dawid Kubacki	
108	3	7 July 2012	(Slovenia) Kranj (Bauhenk HS109)	N _{060}	(Norway) Anders Jacobsen	(Slovenia) Jurij Tepeš	(Slovenia) Peter Prevc	(Norway) Anders Jacobsen	
109	4	8 July 2012	(Slovenia) Kranj (Bauhenk HS109)	N _{061}	(Slovenia) Peter Prevc	(Czech Republic) Jan Matura	(Slovenia) Jaka Hvala	(Norway) Anders Jacobsen	
110	5	14 July 2012	(Russia) Sochi (RusSki Gorki HS140)	L _{049}	(Czech Republic) Jan Matura	(Norway) Anders Jacobsen	(Slovenia) Tomaž Naglič	(Norway) Anders Jacobsen	
111	6	15 July 2012	(Russia) Sochi (RusSki Gorki HS140)	L _{050}	(Norway) Anders Jacobsen	(Slovenia) Tomaž Naglič	(Poland) Dawid Kubacki	(Norway) Anders Jacobsen	
112	7	10 August 2012	(Finland) Kuopio (Puijo HS127)	L _{051}	(Slovenia) Tomaž Naglič	(Germany) Andreas Wellinger	(Finland) Janne Happonen	(Norway) Anders Jacobsen	
113	8	11 August 2012	(Finland) Kuopio (Puijo HS127)	L _{052}	(Czech Republic) Jan Matura	(Norway) Fredrik Bjerkeengen	(Germany) Andreas Wellinger	(Czech Republic) Jan Matura	
114	9	8 September 2012	(Norway) Lillehammer (Lysgårdsbakken HS138)	L _{053}	(Germany) Andreas Wellinger	(Austria) Wolfgang Loitzl	(Czech Republic) Jan Matura	(Czech Republic) Jan Matura	
115	10	9 September 2012	(Norway) Lillehammer (Lysgårdsbakken HS138)	L _{054}	(Austria) Wolfgang Loitzl	(Slovenia) Cene Prevc	(Germany) Stephan Leyhe	(Czech Republic) Jan Matura	
116	11	15 September 2012	(Russia) Chaykovsky (Snezhinka HS140)	L _{055}	(Austria) Wolfgang Loitzl	(Russia) Alexey Romashov	(Austria) Stefan Hayböck	(Czech Republic) Jan Matura	
117	12	16 September 2012	(Russia) Chaykovsky (Snezhinka HS140)	L _{056}	(Austria) Wolfgang Loitzl	(Russia) Denis Kornilov	(Germany) Karl Geiger	(Czech Republic) Jan Matura	
118	13	22 September 2012	(Germany) Klingenthal (Vogtland Arena HS140)	L _{057}	(Austria) Wolfgang Loitzl	(Finland) Lauri Asikainen	(Czech Republic) Jan Matura	(Czech Republic) Jan Matura	
119	14	23 September 2012	(Germany) Klingenthal (Vogtland Arena HS140)	L _{058}	(Austria) Wolfgang Loitzl	(Germany) Karl Geiger	(Czech Republic) Jakub Janda	(Czech Republic) Jan Matura	
11th FIS Summer Continental Cup Men's Overall (30 June – 23 September 2012)					(Czech Republic) Jan Matura	(Austria) Wolfgang Loitzl	(Norway) Anders Jacobsen	Summer Overall	

==== Overall ====
Rank	after 14 events	Points
1	(Czech Republic) Jan Matura	742
2	(Austria) Wolfgang Loitzl	680
3	(Norway) Anders Jacobsen	478
4	(Slovenia) Tomaž Naglič	395
5	(Germany) Karl Geiger	346
6	(Austria) Lukas Müller	318
7	(Germany) Andreas Wellinger	314
8	(Poland) Dawid Kubacki	240
9	(Slovenia) Peter Prevc	226
10	(Germany) Stephan Leyhe	215

== Men's Winter ==
Individual men's events in the CC history

Total	F	L	N	Winners
749	4	365	380

after normal hill event in Nizhny Tagil (17 March 2013)

=== Calendar ===
All	No.	Date	Place (Hill)	Size	Winner	Second	Third	Overall leader	R.
		1 December 2012	(Kazakhstan) Almaty (Sunkar HS140)	L _{cnx}	cancelled and rescheduled to 8 December			—	
		2 December 2012	(Kazakhstan) Almaty (Sunkar HS140)	L _{cnx}	cancelled and rescheduled to 9 December			—	
722	1	(Note: Men's large hill competition in Almaty (1 December) was rescheduled on 8 December.)8 December 2012	(Kazakhstan) Almaty (Sunkar HS140)	L _{343}	(Austria) Stefan Kraft	(Poland) Klemens Murańka	(Austria) David Zauner	(Austria) Stefan Kraft	
723	2	(Note: Men's large hill competition in Almaty (2 December) was rescheduled on 9 December.)9 December 2012	(Kazakhstan) Almaty (Sunkar HS140)	L _{344}	(Austria) Stefan Kraft	(Poland) Klemens Murańka	(Austria) David Zauner	(Austria) Stefan Kraft	
		8 December 2012	(Turkey) Erzurum (Kiremitliktepe HS140)	L _{cnx}	cancelled due to organisational problems			—	
		9 December 2012	(Turkey) Erzurum (Kiremitliktepe HS140)	L _{cnx}	cancelled due to organisational problems			—	
		15 December 2012	(Finland) Lahti (Puijo HS127)	L _{cnx}	cancelled due to strong wind and rescheduled on next day			—	
		(Note: Men's large hill competition in Lahti (15 December) was rescheduled on first event at 16 December and finally cancelled.)16 December 2012	(Finland) Lahti (Puijo HS127)	L _{cnx}	finally cancelled due to strong wind (rescheduled in Iron Mountain on 9 February)			—	
		16 December 2012	(Finland) Lahti (Puijo HS127)	L _{cnx}	cancelled due to strong wind			—	
724	3	27 December 2012	(Switzerland) Engelberg (Gross-Titlis HS137)	L _{345}	(Austria) Stefan Kraft	(Austria) Thomas Diethart	(Poland) Jan Ziobro	(Austria) Stefan Kraft	
725	4	28 December 2012	(Switzerland) Engelberg (Gross-Titlis HS137)	L _{346}	(Germany) Martin Schmitt	(Poland) Stefan Hula	(Germany) Felix Schoft	(Austria) Stefan Kraft	
726	5	(Note: Men's large hill competition in Zakopane (5 January) had only one round.)5 January 2013	(Poland) Zakopane (Wielka Krokiew HS134)	L _{347}	(Germany) Daniel Wenig	(Germany) Maximilian Mechler	(Germany) Marinus Kraus	(Austria) Stefan Kraft	
727	6	6 January 2013	(Poland) Zakopane (Wielka Krokiew HS134)	L _{348}	(Slovenia) Anže Semenič	(Germany) Danny Queck	(Norway) K.R. Elverum Sorsell	(Austria) Stefan Kraft	
728	7	11 January 2013	(Japan) Sapporo (Miyanomori HS100 (Ōkurayama HS134)	N _{376}	(Germany) Felix Schoft	(Austria) Lukas Müller	(South Korea) Choi Seou	(Austria) Stefan Kraft	
729	8	12 January 2013	(Japan) Sapporo (Miyanomori HS100 (Ōkurayama HS134)	L _{349}	(Switzerland) Gregor Deschwanden	(Norway) O. Marius Ingvaldsen	(Germany) Felix Schoft	(Austria) Stefan Kraft	
730	9	13 January 2013	(Japan) Sapporo (Miyanomori HS100 (Ōkurayama HS134)	L _{350}	(Norway) K.R. Elverum Sorsell	(Japan) Takanobu Okabe	(Slovenia) Miran Zupančič	(Austria) Stefan Kraft	
731	10	19 January 2013	(Austria) Bischofshofen (Paul-Ausserleitner HS140)	L _{351}	(Austria) Manuel Fettner	(Austria) Martin Koch	(Germany) Marinus Kraus	(Austria) Stefan Kraft	
732	11	20 January 2013	(Austria) Bischofshofen (Paul-Ausserleitner HS140)	L _{352}	(Austria) Manuel Fettner	(Austria) Martin Koch	(Czech Republic) Čestmír Kožíšek	(Germany) Felix Schoft	
733	12	26 January 2013	(Germany) Titisee-Neustadt (Hochfirstschanze HS142)	L _{353}	(Norway) Fredrik Bjerkeengen	(Austria) Manuel Fettner	(United States) Nicholas Alexander	(Norway) O. M. Ingvaldsen	
734	13	(Note: Men's large hill competition in Titisee-Neustadt (27 January) had only one round.)27 January 2013	(Germany) Titisee-Neustadt (Hochfirstschanze HS142)	L _{354}	(Austria) Manuel Fettner	(Norway) K. R. Elverum Sorsell (Slovenia) Rok Justin		(Norway) K. R. E. Sorsell	
		2 February 2012	(Slovenia) Kranj (Bauhenk HS109)	N _{cnx}	cancelled and rescheduled to Planica on same dates			—	
		3 February 2012	(Slovenia) Kranj (Bauhenk HS109)	N _{cnx}	cancelled and rescheduled to Planica on same dates			—	
		(Note: Cancelled men's normal hill competition in Kranj (2 February) was rescheduled on large hill in Planica)2 February 2013	(Slovenia) Planica (Bloudkova velikanka HS139)	L _{cnx}	cancelled due to heavy snowfall and rescheduled on 3 February			—	
735	14	(Note: Cancelled men's normal hill competition in Kranj (2 February) was rescheduled on large hill in Planica and again rescheduled on 1st event on 3 February.)3 February 2013	(Slovenia) Planica (Bloudkova velikanka HS139)	L _{355}	(Austria) Stefan Kraft	(Poland) Stefan Hula	(Slovenia) Anže Semenič	(Austria) Stefan Kraft	
736	15	(Note: Cancelled men's normal hill competition in Kranj (3 February) was rescheduled on large hill in Planica)3 February 2013	(Slovenia) Planica (Bloudkova velikanka HS139)	L _{356}	(Poland) Stefan Hula	(Austria) Stefan Kraft	(Norway) Vegard Swensen	(Austria) Stefan Kraft	
737	16	9 February 2013	(United States) Iron Mountain (Pine Mountain HS133)	L _{357}	(Norway) Fredrik Bjerkeengen	(Slovenia) Matic Benedik	(Germany) Christian Heim	(Austria) Stefan Kraft	
738	17	(Note: Men's large hill competition in Lahti (15 December) and rescheduled on 16 December was finally cancelled and replaced in Iron Mountain on 9 February (1st event of the day).)9 February 2013	(United States) Iron Mountain (Pine Mountain HS133)	L _{358}	(Slovenia) Anže Semenič	(Slovenia) Matic Benedik	(Austria) Thomas Diethart	(Austria) Stefan Kraft	
739	18	10 February 2013	(United States) Iron Mountain (Pine Mountain HS133)	L _{359}	(Slovenia) Anže Semenič	(Slovenia) Andraž Pograjc	(Slovenia) Matic Benedik (Germany) Felix Schoft	(Austria) Stefan Kraft	
740	18	16 February 2013	(Germany) Brotterode (Ingelsbergschanze HS117)	L _{360}	(Germany) Danny Queck	(Slovenia) Matic Benedik	(Slovenia) Anže Semenič	(Austria) Stefan Kraft	
741	19	17 February 2013	(Germany) Brotterode (Ingelsbergschanze HS117)	L _{361}	(Slovenia) Andraž Pograjc	(Norway) A. Pedersen Rønsen	(Norway) O. Marius Ingvaldsen	(Slovenia) Andraž Pograjc	
742	20	23 February 2013	(Poland) Wisla (Malinka HS134)	L _{362}	(Germany) Danny Queck	(Slovenia) Matic Benedik	(Poland) Krzysztof Biegun	(Slovenia) Andraž Pograjc	
743	21	24 February 2013	(Poland) Wisla (Malinka HS134)	L _{363}	(Norway) A. Pedersen Rønsen	(Slovenia) Matic Benedik	(Poland) Jan Ziobro	(Slovenia) Matic Benedik	
744	22	2 March 2013	(Czech Republic) Liberec (Ještěd B HS100)	N _{377}	(Germany) Marinus Kraus	(Norway) K.R. Elverum Sorsell	(Slovenia) Matic Kramaršič	(Slovenia) Matic Benedik	
745	23	(Note: Men's large hill competition in Liberec (3 March) had only one round.)3 March 2013	(Czech Republic) Liberec (Ještěd B HS100)	N _{378}	(Germany) Marinus Kraus	(Norway) Fredrik Bjerkeengen (Slovenia) Matic Kramaršič		(Slovenia) Matic Benedik	
746	24	(Note: Originally scheduled men's large hill competition in Vikersund (9 March) was rescheduled on 8 March.)8 March 2013	(Norway) Vikersund (Vikersundbakken HS117)	L _{364}	(Germany) Maximilian Mechler	(Poland) Jan Ziobro	(Germany) Marinus Kraus	(Slovenia) Matic Benedik	
747	25	(Note: Originally scheduled men's large hill competition in Vikersund (10 March) was rescheduled on 9 March.)9 March 2013	(Norway) Vikersund (Vikersundbakken HS117)	L _{365}	(Norway) Johann André Forfang	(Austria) Manuel Poppinger	(Germany) Marinus Kraus	(Slovenia) Anže Semenič	
		9 March 2013	(Norway) Vikersund (Vikersundbakken HS117)	L _{cnx}	originally scheduled, cancelled and rescheduled on 8 March			—	
		10 March 2013	(Norway) Vikersund (Vikersundbakken HS117)	L _{cnx}	originally scheduled, cancelled and rescheduled to 9 March			—	
		16 March 2013	(Russia) Nizhny Tagil (Tramplin Stork HS134 / 100)	L _{cnx}	moved to large hill due to bad weather conditions on same date			—	
748	26	(Note: Originally scheduled men's large hill competition in Nizhny Tagil (16 March) was moved to normal hill due to bad weather conditions.)16 March 2013	(Russia) Nizhny Tagil (Tramplin Stork HS134 / 100)	N _{379}	(Slovenia) Rok Justin	(Russia) Alexsander Sardyko	(Poland) Jan Ziobro	(Slovenia) Anže Semenič	
		17 March 2013	(Russia) Nizhny Tagil (Tramplin Stork HS134 / 100)	L _{cnx}	moved to large hill due to bad weather conditions on same date			—	
749	27	(Note: Originally scheduled men's large hill competition in Nizhny Tagil (17 March) was moved to normal hill due to bad weather conditions.)17 March 2013	(Russia) Nizhny Tagil (Tramplin Stork HS134 / 100)	N _{380}	(Slovenia) Rok Justin	(Austria) Thomas Diethart	(Russia) Ilmir Hazetdinov	(Slovenia) Anže Semenič	
22nd FIS Winter Continental Cup Men's Overall (8 December 2012 – 17 March 2013)					(Slovenia) Anže Semenič	(Norway) Fredrik Bjerkeengen	(Slovenia) Matic Benedik	Winter Overall	

==== Overall ====
Rank	after 27 events	Points
1	(Slovenia) Anže Semenič	667
2	(Norway) Fredrik Bjerkeengen	656
3	(Slovenia) Matic Benedik	651
4	(Norway) Atle Pedersen Rønsen	647
5	(Germany) Marinus Kraus	636
6	(Norway) Kim René Elverum Sorsell	633
7	(Slovenia) Andraž Pograjc	583
8	(Poland) Jan Ziobro	548
9	(Germany) Felix Schoft	531
10	(Austria) Stefan Kraft	525

== Women's Individual ==
Individual women's events in the CC history

Total	L	N	M	Winners
38	—	27	11

after normal hill event in Lillehammer (9 September 2012)

=== Summer ===
All	No.	Date	Place (Hill)	Size	Winner	Second	Third	Overall leader	R.
37	1	8 September 2012	(Norway) Lillehammer (Lysgårdsbakken HS100)	N _{026}	(Austria) Daniela Iraschko	(Austria) J. Seifriedsberger	(Finland) Julia Kykkänen	(Austria) Daniela Iraschko	
38	2	9 September 2012	(Norway) Lillehammer (Lysgårdsbakken HS100)	N _{027}	(Austria) J. Seifriedsberger	(Austria) Daniela Iraschko	(Slovenia) Anja Tepeš	(Austria) J. Seifriedsberger (Austria) Daniela Iraschko	
5th FIS Summer Continental Cup Women's Overall (8 – 9 September 2012)					(Austria) Daniela Iraschko (Austria) J. Seifriedsberger		(Slovenia) Anja Tepeš	Summer Overall	

==== Overall ====
Rank	after 2 events	Points
1	(Austria) Daniela Iraschko	180
	(Austria) Jacqueline Seifriedsberger	180
3	(Slovenia) Anja Tepeš	100
4	(Finland) Julia Kykkänen	82
5	(Switzerland) Bigna Windmüller	76
6	(Canada) Atsuko Tanaka	74
	(Slovenia) Eva Logar	74
8	(Canada) Alexandra Pretorius	72
10	(Italy) Elena Runggaldier	62

== Women's Winter ==
Individual women's events in the CC history

Total	L	N	M	Winners
134	9	110	15

after normal hill event in Örnsköldsvik (10 March 2013)

=== Calendar ===
All	No.	Date	Place (Hill)	Size	Winner	Second	Third	Overall leader	R.
		30 November 2012	(Norway) Notodden (Tveitanbakken HS100)	N _{cnx}	cancelled due to high temperatures (1st event rescheduled in Örnsköldsvik on 9 March)			—	
		1 December 2012	(Norway) Notodden (Tveitanbakken HS100)	N _{cnx}	cancelled due to high temperatures (1st event rescheduled in Örnsköldsvik on 9 March)			—	
131	1	2 March 2013	(Germany) Oberwiesenthal (Fichtelbergschanzen HS106)	N _{107}	(Slovenia) Ema Klinec	(Czech Republic) M. Doleželová	(Germany) Juliane Seyfarth	(Slovenia) Ema Klinec	
		3 March 2013	(Germany) Oberwiesenthal (Fichtelbergschanzen HS106)	N _{cnx}	cancelled due to problems with the inrun			—	
132	2	9 March 2013	(Sweden) Örnsköldsvik (Paradiskullen HS100)	N _{108}	(Russia) Irina Avvakumova (Finland) Julia Kykkänen		(Russia) A. Barannikova	(Russia) Irina Avvakumova	
133	3	(Note: Women's normal hill cancelled competition in Notodden (30 November) was rescheduled in Örnsköldsvik on 9 March (2nd event of the day).)9 March 2013	(Sweden) Örnsköldsvik (Paradiskullen HS100)	N _{109}	(Russia) Irina Avvakumova	(Finland) Julia Kykkänen	(Germany) Ramona Straub	(Russia) Irina Avvakumova	
134	4	10 March 2013	(Sweden) Örnsköldsvik (Paradiskullen HS100)	N _{110}	(Russia) Irina Avvakumova	(Germany) Ramona Straub	(Finland) Julia Kykkänen	(Russia) Irina Avvakumova	
9th FIS Winter Continental Cup Women's Overall (2 March – 10 March 2013)					(Russia) Irina Avvakumova	(Finland) Julia Kykkänen	(Germany) Ramona Straub	Winter Overall	

==== Overall ====
Rank	after 4 events	Points
1	(Russia) Irina Avvakumova	350
2	(Finland) Julia Kykkänen	240
3	(Germany) Ramona Straub	230
4	(Russia) Anastasiya Barannikova	187
5	(Germany) Pauline Heßler	160
6	(Russia) Sofya Tikhonova	142
7	(Russia) Alexsandra Kustova	138
8	(United States) Nita Englund	131
9	(United States) Nina Lussi	105
10	(Slovenia) Ema Klinec	100

== Europa Cup vs. Continental Cup ==
- Last two Europa Cup seasons (1991/92 and 1992/93) are recognized as first two Continental Cup seasons by International Ski Federation (FIS), although Continental Cup under this name officially started first season in 1993/94 season.

== See also ==
- Poland at the 2012–13 FIS Ski Jumping Continental Cup
- 2012–13 FIS World Cup
- 2012 FIS Grand Prix
