= 2011–12 FIS Ski Jumping Continental Cup =

Ski-jumping competition series

FIS Ski Jumping Continental Cup 2011/12
Discipline	Men	Women
Summer	(Poland) Aleksander Zniszczoł	(France) Coline Mattel
Winter	(Norway) Andreas Stjernen	(Austria) Daniela Iraschko

Competition
Edition	10th (Summer), 21st (Winter)	4th (Summer), 8th (Winter)
Locations	5 (Summer), 13 (Winter)	5 (Summer), 4 (Winter)
Individual	10 (Summer), 27 (Winter)	8 (Summer), 7 (Winter)
Cancelled	2 (Summer), 2 (Winter)	— (Summer), 1 (Winter)
Rescheduled	— (Summer), 5 (Winter)	— (Summer), 1 (Winter)

The 2011/12 FIS Ski Jumping Continental Cup was the 21st in a row (19th official) Continental Cup winter season and the 10th official summer season in ski jumping for men. Aleksander Zniszczoł won summer overall and Andreas Stjernen winter overall.

This was also the 8th winter and the 4rd summer season for women. Coline Mattel won summer and Daniela Iraschko winter overall.

Other competitions this season were World Cup and Grand Prix.

== Men's Summer ==
Individual men's events in the CC history

Total	F	L	N	Winners
105	—	46	59

after large hill event in Klingenthal (25 September 2011)

=== Summer ===
All	No.	Date	Place (Hill)	Size	Winner	Second	Third	Overall leader	R.
96	1	2 July 2011	(Slovenia) Kranj (Bauhenk HS109)	N _{058}	(Slovenia) Robert Kranjec	(Bulgaria) Vladimir Zografski	(Poland) Dawid Kubacki	(Slovenia) Robert Kranjec	
97	2	3 July 2011	(Slovenia) Kranj (Bauhenk HS109)	N _{059}	(Slovenia) Jure Šinkovec	(Slovenia) Peter Prevc	(Poland) Grzegorz Miętus (Bulgaria) Vladimir Zografski	(Bulgaria) Vladimir Zografski	
98	3	9 July 2011	(Austria) Stams (Brunnentalschanze HS115)	L _{039}	(Slovenia) Peter Prevc	(Poland) A. Zniszczoł	(Slovenia) Jure Šinkovec	(Slovenia) Peter Prevc	
99	4	10 July 2011	(Austria) Stams (Brunnentalschanze HS115)	L _{040}	(Slovenia) Peter Prevc	(Norway) Anders Fannemel	(Japan) Junshirō Kobayashi	(Slovenia) Peter Prevc	
100	5	30 July 2011	(France) Courchevel (Tremplin du Praz HS132)	L _{041}	(Germany) Andreas Wank	(Austria) Stefan Kraft	(Austria) Manuel Poppinger	(Slovenia) Peter Prevc	
101	6	31 July 2011	(France) Courchevel (Tremplin du Praz HS132)	L _{042}	(Germany) Andreas Wank	(Canada) M. Boyd-Clowes	(Slovenia) Tomaž Naglič	(Slovenia) Peter Prevc	
102	7	10 September 2011	(Norway) Trondheim (Granåsen HS138)	L _{043}	(Poland) A. Zniszczoł	(Norway) Anders Fannemel	(Norway) Tom Hilde	(Poland) A. Zniszczoł	
103	8	11 September 2011	(Norway) Trondheim (Granåsen HS138)	L _{044}	(Slovenia) Peter Prevc	(Poland) A. Zniszczoł	(Norway) A. Pedersen Rønsen	(Poland) A. Zniszczoł	
		17 September 2011	(Turkey) Erzurum (Kiremitliktepe HS140)	L _{cnx}	cancelled			—	
		17 September 2011	(Turkey) Erzurum (Kiremitliktepe HS140)	L _{cnx}	cancelled			—	
104	9	24 September 2011	(Germany) Klingenthal (Vogtland Arena HS140)	L _{045}	(Poland) Piotr Żyła	(Norway) K.R. Elverum Sorsell	(Italy) Andrea Morassi	(Poland) A. Zniszczoł	
105	10	25 September 2011	(Germany) Klingenthal (Vogtland Arena HS140)	L _{046}	(Poland) Piotr Żyła	(Germany) Andreas Wank	(Estonia) Kaarel Nurmsalu	(Poland) A. Zniszczoł	
10th FIS Summer Continental Cup Men's Overall (2 July – 25 September 2011)					(Poland) A. Zniszczoł	(Slovenia) Peter Prevc	(Germany) Andreas Wank	Summer Overall	

==== Overall ====
Rank	after 10 events	Points
1	(Poland) Aleksander Zniszczoł	541
2	(Slovenia) Peter Prevc	470
3	(Germany) Andreas Wank	426
4	(Austria) Stefan Kraft	345
5	(Poland) Piotr Żyła	272
6	(Norway) Anders Fannemel	255
7	(Slovenia) Jure Šinkovec	216
8	(Slovenia) Robert Hrgota	191
9	(Norway) Kim René Elverum Sorsell	158
10	(Austria) Manuel Poppinger	157

== Men's Winter ==
Individual men's events in the CC history

Total	F	L	N	Winners
721	4	342	375

after large hill event in Lahti (11 March 2012)

=== Calendar ===
All	No.	Date	Place (Hill)	Size	Winner	Second	Third	Overall leader	R.
		29 November 2011	(Finland) Rovaniemi (Ounasvaara HS100)	N _{cnx}	cancelled due to lack of snow and rescheduled to 28 November			—	
695	1	(Note: Cancelled men's normal hill competition in Rovaniemi (19 November) was rescheduled on 28 November.)28 November 2011	(Finland) Rovaniemi (Ounasvaara HS100)	N _{369}	(Austria) Michael Hayböck	(Norway) Kenneth Gangnes	(Norway) A. Pedersen Rønsen	(Austria) Michael Hayböck	
696	2	(Note: Cancelled men's normal hill competition in Rovaniemi (30 November) was rescheduled on 29 November.)29 November 2011	(Finland) Rovaniemi (Ounasvaara HS100)	N _{370}	(Norway) Vegard Haukø Sklett	(Norway) A. Pedersen Rønsen	(Austria) Michael Hayböck	(Austria) Michael Hayböck	
		30 November 2011	(Finland) Rovaniemi (Ounasvaara HS100)	N _{cnx}	cancelled due to lack of snow and rescheduled to 29 November			—	
697	3	13 December 2011	(Kazakhstan) Almaty (Sunkar HS140)	L _{323}	(Austria) Michael Hayböck	(Poland) Aleksander Zniszczoł	(Norway) A. Pedersen Rønsen	(Austria) Michael Hayböck	
698	4	14 December 2011	(Kazakhstan) Almaty (Sunkar HS140)	L _{324}	(Austria) Michael Hayböck	(Slovenia) Žiga Mandl	(Germany) Markus Eisenbichler	(Austria) Michael Hayböck	
		17 December 2011	(Turkey) Erzurum (Kiremitliktepe HS109 / 140)	N _{cnx}	cancelled due to floodlight problems and recheduled on the next day			—	
699	5	(Note: Cancelled men's normal hill competition in Erzurum (17 December) was rescheduled on 18 December.)18 December 2011	(Turkey) Erzurum (Kiremitliktepe HS109 / 140)	N _{371}	(Germany) Danny Queck	(Austria) Michael Hayböck	(Norway) A. Pedersen Rønsen	(Austria) Michael Hayböck	
700	6	18 December 2011	(Turkey) Erzurum (Kiremitliktepe HS109 / 140)	L _{325}	(Norway) A. Pedersen Rønsen	(Poland) Tomasz Byrt	(Austria) Manuel Poppinger	(Austria) Michael Hayböck	
701	7	27 December 2011	(Switzerland) Engelberg (Gross-Titlis HS137)	L _{326}	(Norway) Kenneth Gangnes	(Slovenia) Jaka Hvala	(Austria) Wolfgang Loitzl	(Austria) Michael Hayböck	
702	8	28 December 2011	(Switzerland) Engelberg (Gross-Titlis HS137)	L _{327}	(Norway) Kenneth Gangnes (Austria) Wolfgang Loitzl		(Slovenia) Jaka Hvala	(Austria) Michael Hayböck	
		7 January 2012	(Slovenia) Kranj (Bauhenk HS109)	N _{cnx}	cancelled due to high temperatures and lack of snow			—	
		8 January 2012	(Slovenia) Kranj (Bauhenk HS109)	N _{cnx}	cancelled due to high temperatures and lack of snow			—	
703	9	14 January 2012	(Germany) Titisee-Neustadt (Hochfirstschanze HS142)	L _{328}	(Austria) Manuel Fettner	(Poland) Stefan Hula	(Norway) Robert Johansson	(Austria) Michael Hayböck	
704	10	15 January 2012	(Germany) Titisee-Neustadt (Hochfirstschanze HS142)	L _{329}	(Austria) Manuel Fettner	(Czech Republic) Antonín Hájek	(Norway) Andreas Stjernen	(Austria) Michael Hayböck	
705	11	20 January 2012	(Japan) Sapporo (Miyanomori HS100) (Ōkurayama HS134)	N _{372}	(Norway) Andreas Stjernen	(Norway) O. Marius Ingvaldsen	(Canada) M. Boyd-Clowes	(Austria) Michael Hayböck	
706	12	21 January 2012	(Japan) Sapporo (Miyanomori HS100) (Ōkurayama HS134)	L _{330}	(Germany) Felix Schoft	(Slovenia) Dejan Judež	(Japan) Kazuyoshi Funaki	(Austria) Michael Hayböck	
707	13	22 January 2012	(Japan) Sapporo (Miyanomori HS100) (Ōkurayama HS134)	L _{331}	(Norway) Andreas Stjernen	(Japan) Kento Sakuyama	(Slovenia) Robert Hrgota	(Norway) Andreas Stjernen	
708	14	28 January 2012	(Austria) Bischofshofen (Paul-Ausserleitner HS140)	L _{332}	(Austria) Stefan Kraft	(Slovenia) Robert Hrgota	(Norway) Vegard Swensen	(Norway) Andreas Stjernen	
709	15	29 January 2012	(Austria) Bischofshofen (Paul-Ausserleitner HS140)	L _{333}	(Slovenia) Anže Lanišek	(Poland) Aleksander Zniszczoł	(Poland) Klemens Murańka	(Norway) Andreas Stjernen	
710	16	4 February 2012	(Germany) Brotterode (Ingelsbergschanze HS117)	L _{334}	(Norway) Anders Fannemel	(Norway) Simen Grimsrud	(Norway) O. Marius Ingvaldsen	(Norway) Andreas Stjernen	
711	17	5 February 2012	(Germany) Brotterode (Ingelsbergschanze HS117)	L _{335}	(Austria) Michael Hayböck	(Norway) Anders Fannemel	(Norway) Vegard Swensen	(Austria) Michael Hayböck	
		11 February 2012	(United States) Iron Mountain (Pine Mountain HS133)	L _{cnx}	cancelled due to strong wind and rescheduled to next day			—	
712	18	(Note: Cancelled men's large hill competition in Iron Mountain (11 February) was rescheduled on 12 February.)12 February 2012	(United States) Iron Mountain (Pine Mountain HS133)	L _{336}	(Germany) Marinus Kraus	(Germany) Markus Eisenbichler	(Norway) Robert Johansson	(Austria) Michael Hayböck	
		12 February 2012	(United States) Iron Mountain (Pine Mountain HS133)	L _{cnx}	cancelled due to bad weather and rescheduled to Oslo on 17 February			—	
713	19	(Note: Cancelled men's large hill competition in Iron Mountain (12 February) was rescheduled to Oslo on 17 February.)17 February 2012	(Norway) Oslo (Midtstubakken HS106)	N _{373}	(Norway) Andreas Stjernen	(Norway) Kenneth Gangnes	(Germany) Danny Queck	(Norway) Andreas Stjernen (Austria) Michael Hayböck	
714	20	18 February 2012	(Norway) Oslo (Midtstubakken HS106)	N _{374}	(Norway) Andreas Stjernen	(Norway) Kenneth Gangnes	(Austria) Michael Hayböck	(Norway) Andreas Stjernen	
715	21	19 February 2012	(Norway) Oslo (Midtstubakken HS106)	N _{375}	(Norway) Andreas Stjernen	(Slovenia) Mitja Mežnar	(Slovenia) Žiga Mandl	(Norway) Andreas Stjernen	
716	22	25 February 2012	(Poland) Wisla (Malinka HS134)	L _{337}	(Austria) Manuel Fettner	(Norway) Robert Johansson	(Slovenia) Mitja Mežnar	(Norway) Andreas Stjernen	
717	23	26 February 2012	(Poland) Wisla (Malinka HS134)	L _{338}	(Switzerland) Marco Grigoli	(Norway) Andreas Stjernen	(Norway) Kenneth Gangnes	(Norway) Andreas Stjernen	
718	24	3 March 2012	(Italy) Val di Fiemme (Trampolino dal Ben HS134)	L _{339}	(Austria) Wolfgang Loitzl	(Austria) Stefan Kraft	(Switzerland) Marco Grigoli	(Norway) Andreas Stjernen	
719	25	4 March 2012	(Italy) Val di Fiemme (Trampolino dal Ben HS134)	L _{340}	(Austria) Wolfgang Loitzl	(Austria) Lukas Müller	(Poland) Bartłomiej Kłusek	(Norway) Andreas Stjernen	
720	26	10 March 2012	(Finland) Lahti (Puijo HS127)	L _{341}	(Austria) Wolfgang Loitzl	(Austria) Manuel Poppinger	(Norway) Vegard Swensen	(Norway) Andreas Stjernen	
721	27	11 March 2012	(Finland) Lahti (Puijo HS127)	L _{342}	(Norway) Robert Johansson	(Norway) Kenneth Gangnes	(Austria) Stefan Kraft	(Norway) Andreas Stjernen	
21st FIS Winter Continental Cup Men's Overall (28 November 2011 – 11 March 2012)					(Norway) Andreas Stjernen	(Norway) Kenneth Gangnes	(Austria) Michael Hayböck	Winter Overall	

==== Overall ====
Rank	after 27 events	Points
1	(Norway) Andreas Stjernen	1017
2	(Norway) Kenneth Gangnes	899
3	(Austria) Michael Hayböck	834
4	(Slovenia) Žiga Mandl	684
5	(Slovenia) Mitja Mežnar	606
6	(Slovenia) Tomaž Naglič	597
7	(Austria) Wolfgang Loitzl	570
8	(Norway) Robert Johansson	559
9	(Norway) Ole Marius Ingvaldsen	549
10	(Norway) Vegard Swensen	542

== Women's Summer ==
Individual women's events in the CC history

Total	L	N	M	Winners
36	—	25	11

after normal hill event in Trondheim (11 September 2011)

=== Summer ===
All	No.	Date	Place (Hill)	Size	Winner	Second	Third	Overall leader	R.
29	1	19 July 2011	(Poland) Szczyrk (Skalite HS106)	N _{020}	(France) Coline Mattel	(Japan) Sara Takanashi	(Slovenia) Maja Vtič	(France) Coline Mattel	
30	2	22 July 2011	(Poland) Zakopane (Średnia Krokiew HS94)	N _{021}	(Slovenia) Maja Vtič	(Italy) Lisa Demetz	(Germany) Katharina Althaus	(Slovenia) Maja Vtič	
31	3	13 August 2011	(Germany) Bischofsgrün (Ochsenkopfschanze HS71)	M _{010}	(France) Coline Mattel	(Japan) Sara Takanashi	(Slovenia) Maja Vtič	(France) Coline Mattel	
32	4	14 August 2011	(Germany) Bischofsgrün (Ochsenkopfschanze HS71)	M _{011}	(France) Coline Mattel	(Japan) Sara Takanashi	(Slovenia) Eva Logar	(France) Coline Mattel	
33	5	19 August 2011	(Germany) Oberwiesenthal (Fichtelbergschanzen HS106)	N _{022}	(Austria) J. Seifriedsberger	(France) Léa Lemare	(Austria) Daniela Iraschko	(France) Coline Mattel	
34	6	20 August 2011	(Germany) Oberwiesenthal (Fichtelbergschanzen HS106)	N _{023}	(Austria) J. Seifriedsberger	(Slovenia) Ema Klinec	(France) Coline Mattel	(France) Coline Mattel	
35	7	10 September 2011	(Norway) Trondheim (Granåsen HS105)	N _{024}	(Austria) Daniela Iraschko (Austria) J. Seifriedsberger		(France) Coline Mattel	(France) Coline Mattel	
36	8	11 September 2011	(Norway) Trondheim (Granåsen HS105)	N _{025}	(Austria) Daniela Iraschko	(Austria) J. Seifriedsberger	(Germany) Katharina Althaus	(France) Coline Mattel	
4th FIS Summer Continental Cup Women's Overall (19 July – 11 September 2011)					(France) Coline Mattel	(Japan) Sara Takanashi	(Austria) Daniela Iraschko	Summer Overall	

==== Overall ====
Rank	after 8 events	Points
1	(France) Coline Mattel	539
2	(Japan) Sara Takanashi	436
3	(Austria) Daniela Iraschko	360
4	(Slovenia) Maja Vtič	351
5	(Austria) Jacqueline Seifriedsberger	325
6	(Germany) Katharina Althaus	281
7	(Japan) Ayumi Watase	206
8	(Slovenia) Ema Klinec	204
9	(Slovenia) Eva Logar	201
10	(France) Léa Lemare	189

== Women's Winter ==
Individual women's events in the CC history

Total	L	N	M	Winners
130	9	106	15

after normal hill event in Liberec (18 February 2012)

=== Calendar ===
All	No.	Date	Place (Hill)	Size	Winner	Second	Third	Overall leader	R.
124	1	29 November 2011	(Finland) Rovaniemi (Ounasvaara HS100)	N _{100}	(Slovenia) Katja Požun	(Slovenia) Špela Rogelj	(Japan) Sara Takanashi	(Slovenia) Katja Požun	
125	2	(Note: Cancelled women's normal hill competition in Rovaniemi (30 November) was rescheduled on 29 November (2nd event of the day).)29 November 2011	(Finland) Rovaniemi (Ounasvaara HS100)	N _{101}	(Japan) Sara Takanashi	(Slovenia) Urša Bogataj	(Slovenia) Katja Požun	(Japan) Sara Takanashi (Slovenia) Katja Požun	
		30 November 2011	(Finland) Rovaniemi (Ounasvaara HS100)	N _{cnx}	cancelled due to lack of snow and rescheduled to 29 November			—	
126	3	9 December 2011	(Norway) Notodden (Tveitanbakken HS100)	N _{102}	(Austria) Daniela Iraschko	(United States) Sarah Hendrickson	(Austria) J. Seifriedsberger	(Slovenia) Katja Požun	
127	4	10 December 2011	(Norway) Notodden (Tveitanbakken HS100)	N _{103}	(Norway) Anette Sagen	(Austria) Daniela Iraschko	(United States) Sarah Hendrickson	(Slovenia) Špela Rogelj	
128	5	20 January 2012	(Poland) Zakopane (Średnia Krokiew HS94)	N _{104}	(United States) Sarah Hendrickson	(Austria) Daniela Iraschko	(Slovenia) Ema Klinec	(Austria) Daniela Iraschko	
129	6	21 January 2012	(Poland) Zakopane (Średnia Krokiew HS94)	N _{105}	(Austria) Daniela Iraschko	(United States) Sarah Hendrickson	(Slovenia) Ema Klinec	(Austria) Daniela Iraschko	
130	7	18 February 2012	(Czech Republic) Liberec (Ještěd B HS100)	N _{106}	(United States) Sarah Hendrickson	(Austria) Daniela Iraschko	(Japan) Sara Takanashi	(Austria) Daniela Iraschko	
		19 February 2012	(Czech Republic) Liberec (Ještěd B HS100)	N _{cnx}	cancelled due to heavy snowfall			—	
8th FIS Winter Continental Cup Women's Overall (29 November 2011 – 18 February 2012)					(Austria) Daniela Iraschko	(United States) Sarah Hendrickson	(Slovenia) Maja Vtič	Winter Overall	

==== Overall ====
Rank	after 7 events	Points
1	(Austria) Daniela Iraschko	440
2	(United States) Sarah Hendrickson	420
3	(Slovenia) Maja Vtič	256
4	(Japan) Sara Takanashi	220
5	(Slovenia) Špela Rogelj	211
6	(Slovenia) Katja Požun	206
7	(Slovenia) Urša Bogataj	182
8	(Austria) Jacqueline Seifriedsberger	152
9	(Netherlands) Wendy Vuik	139
10	(Slovenia) Ema Klinec	136
	(Norway) Anette Sagen	136

== Europa Cup vs. Continental Cup ==
- Last two Europa Cup seasons (1991/92 and 1992/93) are recognized as first two Continental Cup seasons by International Ski Federation (FIS), although Continental Cup under this name officially started first season in 1993/94 season.

== See also ==
- 2011–12 FIS World Cup
- 2011 FIS Grand Prix
