= Poland at the 2012–13 FIS Ski Jumping Continental Cup =

The Polish national ski jumping team in the 2012–13 FIS Ski Jumping Continental Cup amassed a total of 2,277 points, securing 5th place among all competing nations. Polish athletes achieved 9 podium finishes, with 4 individuals contributing: Klemens Murańka, Jan Ziobro, Stefan Hula, and Krzysztof Biegun. Notably, Hula secured a victory in Planica. 13 Polish competitors earned points, with Tomasz Byrt being the only participant who did not score.

Initially, Klemens Murańka led the Polish contingent in points, followed by Stefan Hula, who later transitioned to the World Cup. Ultimately, Jan Ziobro achieved the highest individual ranking among Poles, finishing 8th in the overall standings.

== Background ==
The 2012–13 Continental Cup season featured 26 competitions. In the previous season, Polish ski jumpers reached the podium 6 times. Aleksander Zniszczoł was the highest-ranked Pole, finishing 21st, with 13 Polish athletes scoring points.

== Season overview ==
=== Almaty (8–9 December 2012) ===
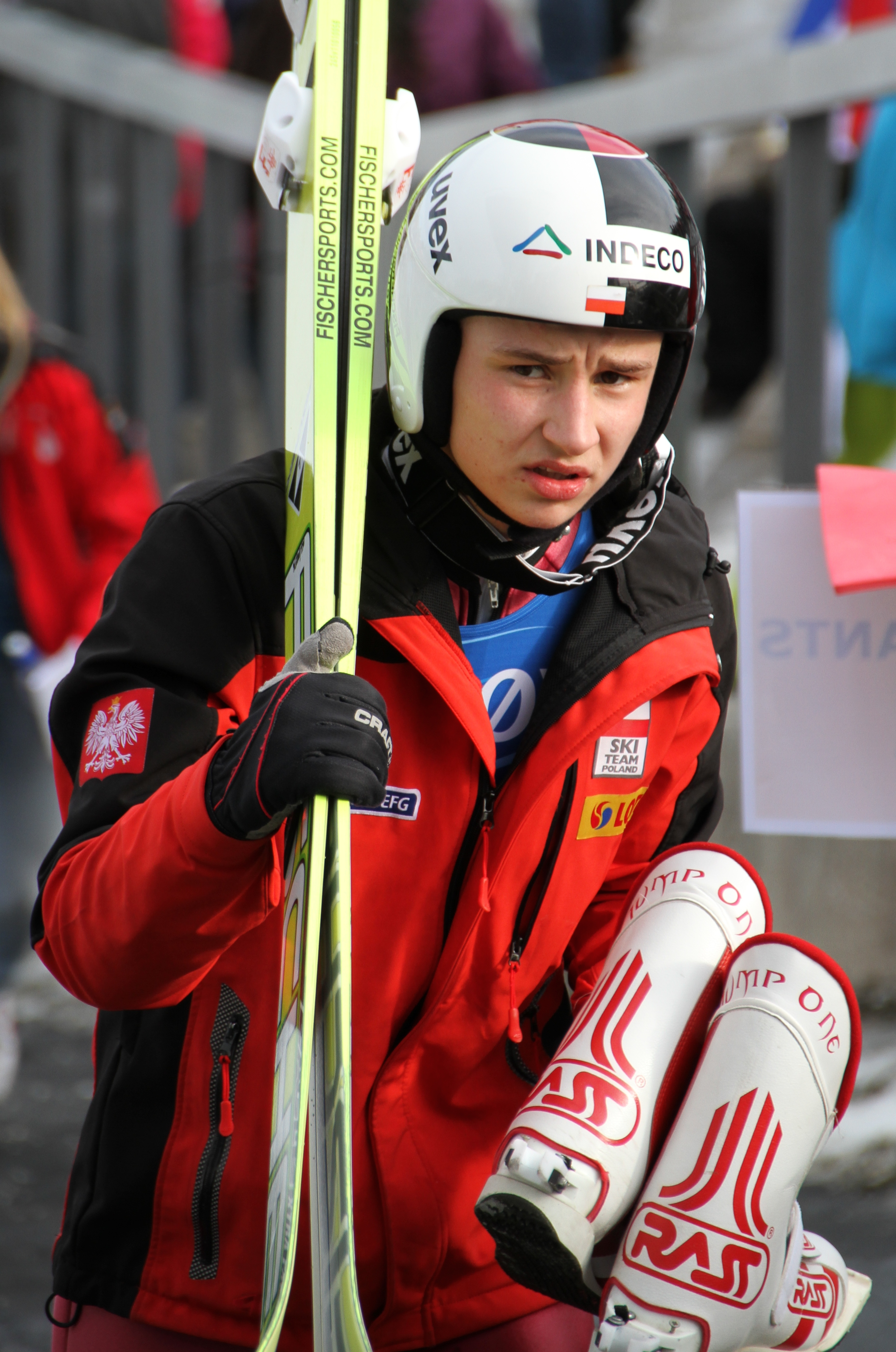
Klemens Murańka, the vice-leader of the overall standings after the initial competitions

The first competition of the Continental Cup, held on 8 December 2012 in Almaty, featured 5 Polish ski jumpers. After the first round, Klemens Murańka held 2nd place with a 131.5 m jump, one point ahead of 3rd-placed Maximilian Mechler and 16 points behind leader Stefan Kraft. Aleksander Zniszczoł was 14th with a 124 m jump, while Jan Ziobro, Stefan Hula, and debutant Stanisław Biela placed outside the top 30, with jumps of 120 m (31st, 0.8 points shy of 30th), 114 m (40th), and 106 m (46th), respectively. In the second round, Zniszczoł jumped 123 m to climb to 8th, while Murańka maintained 2nd with a 128.5 m jump, edging out David Zauner by 0.2 points but remaining 16 points behind Kraft.

The following day, 9 December 2012, two Poles scored points. Murańka again took 2nd after a 129.5 m first-round jump, trailing Kraft by 4.1 points. Biela advanced to 28th with a 118.5 m jump. Ziobro (33rd, 117 m) and Hula (34th, 116 m) finished in the 4th ten, while Zniszczoł was disqualified for an irregular suit. In the second round, Biela held 28th with a 117 m jump, and Murańka secured 2nd with a 133 m jump, 3.8 points behind Kraft. After two rounds, Kraft led the standings, with Murańka 40 points behind in 2nd, Zniszczoł in 16th, and Biela in 35th.

=== Engelberg (27–28 December 2012) ===
On 27 December 2012, different Polish competitors – Jan Ziobro, Stefan Hula, Łukasz Rutkowski, Andrzej Zapotoczny, and Jakub Kot – competed in Engelberg. After the first round of the first competition, Ziobro was 9th with a 115.5 m jump, 17 points behind Kraft. Hula and Rutkowski, both with 108.5 m jumps, were 18th (tied with Cene Prevc) and 20th, respectively. Zapotoczny and Kot placed 54th and 82nd out of 88 competitors. In the final round, Rutkowski jumped 117.5 m to reach 19th, Hula maintained 18th with a 116 m jump, and Ziobro's 124 m jump – the longest of the competition – earned him 3rd place, 14 points behind the winner.

The second Engelberg competition on 28 December 2012 saw Hula in 2nd after a 132.5 m first-round jump and Rutkowski in 17th with a 127 m jump. Ziobro (42nd), Zapotoczny (67th), and Kot (disqualified) did not advance. In the final round, Rutkowski moved to 16th with a 125 m jump, while Hula held second with a 130 m jump. Hula's performance earned him a call-up to the 2012–13 Four Hills Tournament. In the overall standings, Murańka held 2nd, Hula entered at 9th with 93 points, Ziobro was 19th with 60 points, Rutkowski was 32nd with 27 points, Zniszczoł dropped to 29th, and Biela fell to 54th.

=== Zakopane (5–6 January 2013) ===
On 5 January 2013, Poland hosted a Continental Cup event in Zakopane. The competition consisted of one round due to weather conditions. 4 of the 13 Polish competitors scored points: Murańka was 6th (129 m), Marcin Bachleda was 11th (130.5 m), Zniszczoł was 14th (127 m), and Rutkowski was 18th (126 m). Ziobro placed 31st, Grzegorz Miętus 50th, Zapotoczny 51st, Kot 53rd, Rafał Śliż 58th, Bartłomiej Kłusek 61st, Biela 64th, while Byrt and Biegun were disqualified. The next day's full competition saw Zniszczoł lead after the first round with a 131.5 m jump, 9.7 points ahead of Anže Semenič. Murańka was 9th (123.5 m), Ziobro 10th (123 m, tied with Antonín Hájek), Rutkowski 22nd (119.5 m), Kłusek 26th (118 m, tied with Alexandre Mabboux), and Biegun 29th (117 m). Kot (38th), Miętus (40th), Zapotoczny (45th), Bachleda (54th), Śliż (75th), Biela, and Byrt (both disqualified) did not score. In the final round, Biegun moved to 19th (122.5 m, tied with two Norwegians), Kłusek to 11th (125.5 m), Rutkowski to 15th (123.5 m), Ziobro to 7th (122 m), Murańka to 5th (125 m), while Zniszczoł was disqualified, finishing 30th.

After the Zakopane events, Murańka solidified his position as the vice-leader, increasing his lead over the 3rd-placed competitor to 79 points but trailing Kraft by 100 points. Hula dropped to 19th, Zniszczoł to 32nd, Biela to 65th, Ziobro rose to 18th, and Rutkowski to 30th. Kłusek and Bachleda entered the standings tied at 41st, while Biegun was 52nd.

=== Sapporo (11–13 January 2013) ===
For the 11–13 January 2013 competitions in Sapporo, Poland sent Zapotoczny, Kot, and Biela. In the first competition on the normal hill, Zapotoczny (23rd, 86 m) and Kot (27th, 84 m, tied with Matic Kramaršič) advanced to the second round, while Biela was 48th. In the final round, Zapotoczny moved to 20th (88 m), while Kot dropped to 30th (80 m). The second competition at the Okurayama Ski Jump Stadium large hill saw Kot in 12th (123.5 m, tied with Takanobu Okabe) and Zapotoczny in 15th (125 m) after the first round, with Biela in 36th. In the second round, Zapotoczny rose to 11th (117 m), while Kot fell to 27th (108 m). In the third competition on the K-120 hill, Zapotoczny was 10th (125 m), Biela 27th (112.5 m), and Kot 41st (101 m) after the first round. In the second round, Zapotoczny dropped to 19th (95 m), and Biela fell to 30th (86.5 m, the shortest jump of the round).

In the overall standings, Zapotoczny climbed from 65th to 44th, and Kot from 82nd to 80th. Murańka dropped from second to 5th, while other Poles' rankings declined.

=== Bischofshofen (19–20 January 2013) ===
The 19–20 January 2013 competitions in Bischofshofen featured Ziobro, Hula, Zapotoczny, Rutkowski, Kot, and Biela. In the first competition, Ziobro was 5th (128.5 m, tied with David Unterberger), Hula 13th (126.5 m), and Zapotoczny 15th (126 m, tied with Nicholas Alexander). Rutkowski (46th), Kot (52nd), and Biela (58th) did not advance. In the second round, Zapotoczny dropped to 26th (120 m), Hula rose to 10th (129.5 m), and Ziobro finished 7th (129 m). In the second competition, Ziobro was 7th (128.5 m), Kot 19th (122.5 m), and Hula 22nd (121.5 m). Rutkowski (33rd), Biela (49th), and Zapotoczny (62nd) did not score. In the final round, Hula dropped to 23rd (113 m), Kot to 24th (111 m), and Ziobro rose to 5th (125 m).

In the overall standings, Murańka fell to 6th, Ziobro rose to 12th, Zniszczoł to 41st, and Kot to 78th, while other Poles' rankings dropped.

=== Titisee-Neustadt (26–27 January 2013) ===
The 26–27 January 2013 competitions in Titisee-Neustadt included the same group, except Rafał Śliż replaced Biela. In the first competition, Hula was 9th (131.5 m) and Ziobro 19th (129 m) after the first round. Zapotoczny (41st), Kot (46th), Rutkowski (62nd), and Śliż (disqualified) did not advance. In the final round, Ziobro finished 26th (124.5 m), and Hula 8th (131.5 m). The second competition had one round, with Śliż in 13th (127 m), Ziobro 26th (124.5 m), Rutkowski 30th (123.5 m), Hula 34th, Zapotoczny 48th, and Kot 64th.

In the standings, Murańka dropped to 8th, Ziobro to 15th, Hula rose to 20th, Śliż entered at 80th, and other Poles' rankings fell.

=== Planica (3 February 2013) ===
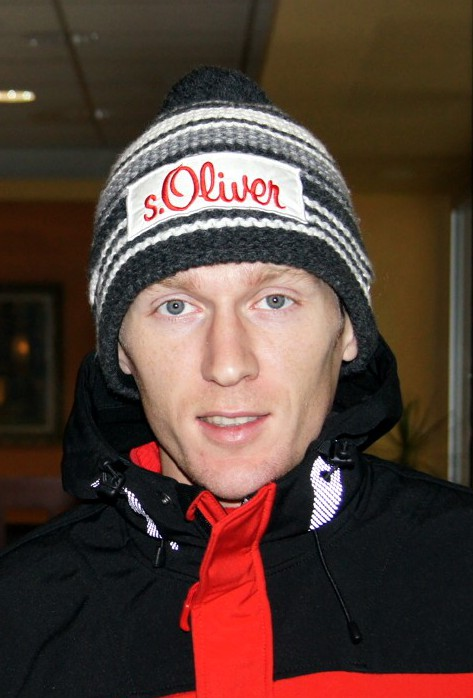
Stefan Hula, winner of the Planica competition

In Planica on 3 February 2013, the same group competed. In the first competition, Hula was 2nd (128.5 m), Śliż 9th, Ziobro 11th (both 124 m), and Rutkowski 21st (121 m). Kot and Zapotoczny were in the 60s and 70s. In the final round, Rutkowski rose to 17th (124.5 m), Ziobro to 10th (122 m), Śliż dropped to 28th (111 m), and Hula held second (125.5 m). In the second competition, Hula led after a 129 m first-round jump, with Rutkowski (23rd, 123 m), Kot (25th, 121 m), and Ziobro (28th, 121 m, tied with Mats Søhagen Berggaard) advancing. Śliż (48th) and Zapotoczny (56th) did not score. In the final round, Kot finished 25th (120.5 m), Rutkowski 22nd (121.5 m), Ziobro 20th (123.5 m), and Hula won with a 130 m jump, scoring 245.7 points, 5.4 points ahead of Kraft.

Hula's two podiums propelled him to 6th in the standings with 339 points. Murańka fell to 13th, Ziobro held 15th, Rutkowski rose to 43rd, Kot to 87th, and other Poles' rankings slightly declined.

=== Iron Mountain (9–10 February 2013) ===
In Iron Mountain on 9–10 February 2013, Poland sent Zniszczoł, Kłusek, Miętus, Biegun, Murańka, and Biela. In the first competition, Murańka was 13th (130.5 m), Kłusek 14th (128 m), Biegun 20th (127.5 m), Miętus 21st (126.5 m), Zniszczoł 24th (125.5 m), and Biela 34th. In the second round, Zniszczoł rose to 7th (129 m), Miętus to 17th (109 m), Biegun to 20th (106 m), Kłusek to 13th (114.5 m), and Murańka dropped to 21st (105.5 m). In the second competition, Biegun was 8th (124.5 m), Murańka 19th (126 m), Kłusek 22nd (125.5 m), Zniszczoł 29th (125.5 m), with Biela and Miętus in the 40s. In the final round, Zniszczoł rose to 27th (125.5 m), Kłusek to 18th (125.5 m), Murańka to 14th (126 m), and Biegun to 7th (124.5 m). In the third competition, Biegun was 10th (123 m, tied with Ole Marius Ingvaldsen), Murańka 12th (123 m), Kłusek 22nd (115.5 m), Zniszczoł 25th (115.5 m), with Biela (37th) and Miętus (38th) out of the points. In the final round, Zniszczoł dropped to 27th (110 m), Kłusek rose to 12th (126 m), Murańka to 5th (130.5 m), and Biegun to 17th (117 m).

Murańka dropped to 14th in the standings, Zniszczoł rose to 41st, Kłusek to 50th, Biegun to 52nd, and Miętus entered at 95th with 14 points. Biela fell to 112th, Hula to 12th, Ziobro to 20th, and other Poles' rankings declined.

=== Brotterode (16–17 February 2013) ===
In Brotterode on 16–17 February 2013, Rutkowski, Zapotoczny, Miętus, and Kot competed. In the first competition, only Rutkowski scored, dropping from 14th (109 m, tied with Tobias Lugert) to 17th (109 m, tied with Robert Johansson). Kot was 37th, Miętus 41st, and Zapotoczny was disqualified. In the second competition, Rutkowski (22nd, 106 m), Zapotoczny (26th, 103.5 m), and Miętus (30th, 103 m) scored, while Kot was 51st. In the final round, Zapotoczny (28th) and Miętus (30th) fell short of 100 m, while Rutkowski's 108 m jump secured 9th.

Rutkowski rose to 38th in the standings, while Hula remained the top Pole at 13th, with others' rankings falling.

=== Wisła (23–24 February 2013) ===
In Wisła on 23–24 February 2013, Ziobro, Rutkowski, Biegun, Kłusek, Zniszczoł, and Miętus competed. In the first competition, Biegun led after a 124.5 m jump, 0.1 points ahead of Matic Benedik. Miętus was 6th (122.5 m), Kłusek 16th (120 m), Ziobro 21st (120 m, tied with Florian Altenburger), Rutkowski 33rd, and Zniszczoł 55th. In the second round, Ziobro rose to 6th (127.5 m), Kłusek dropped to 18th (121 m), Miętus to 9th (122.5 m), and Biegun took third (124 m) behind Danny Queck and Benedik. In the second competition, Ziobro led after a 124.5 m jump, followed by Biegun (6th, 123.5 m), Miętus (13th, 121.5 m), Kłusek (19th, 120 m), Zniszczoł (24th, 119 m), and Rutkowski (34th). In the final round, Rutkowski rose to 15th (122.5 m), Zniszczoł to 24th (120 m), Kłusek to 34th (116 m), Miętus to 23rd (119 m), Biegun to 10th (121.5 m), and Ziobro took third (126.5 m) behind Atle Pedersen Rønsen.

Jan Ziobro moved up from 22nd to 17th place in the overall standings, Biegun from 55th to 30th, and Miętus from 101st to 70th. Rutkowski maintained 38th place, and Zniszczoł 47th. Meanwhile, Kłusek dropped from 52nd to 53rd. The highest-placed Pole remained Stefan Hula, previously 13th, who was now in 15th place. Former series vice-leader Murańka fell to 19th position.

=== Liberec (March 2013) ===
In Liberec at the beginning of March, the participants were Jan Ziobro, Klemens Murańka, Krzysztof Biegun, Łukasz Rutkowski, Bartłomiej Kłusek, and Aleksander Zniszczoł. In the first of the competitions, all of them scored points, which was the first such case that season. After the first jump, Rutkowski was the highest-placed, sitting in 12th position after a long jump of 96.5 m. Biegun was classified one place lower after jumping half a meter farther. Tied in 15th place were Kłusek (95 m) and Murańka (95.5 m). 17th was Ziobro (95 m, along with two other jumpers), and 23rd was Zniszczoł (92.5 m, tied with Vegard Swensen). In the final round, Zniszczoł maintained his position with a jump of 94 m. Ziobro advanced to 13th place after a jump of 97 m, sharing the position with Žiga Mandl. Murańka maintained 15th place with 95.5 m. Kłusek, after jumping 91.5 m, dropped to 22nd place. Both Biegun and Rutkowski landed at 98 m and ultimately took neighboring positions: 5th and 4th, with Rutkowski losing 0.5 points to the podium. In the second competition in this Czech town, four Poles scored points. Only one round was held. Jan Ziobro took 8th place (98 m), Zniszczoł 9th (97 m, tied with two other jumpers), Murańka 18th (96 m), and Rutkowski 28th (92.5 m). Kłusek and Biegun finished in the 6th ten positions.

The points he earned allowed Jan Ziobro to return to 15th place in the overall standings. Since then, he became the highest-ranked Polish representative – previously it had been Stefan Hula, who dropped from 15th to 20th place. Klemens Murańka moved up from 19th to 18th place. Krzysztof Biegun advanced from 30th to 26th, Łukasz Rutkowski from 38th to 29th, Aleksander Zniszczoł from 47th to 41st, and Bartłomiej Kłusek from 52nd to 50th. The positions of the remaining Polish jumpers slightly declined.

=== Vikersund (8–9 March 2013) ===
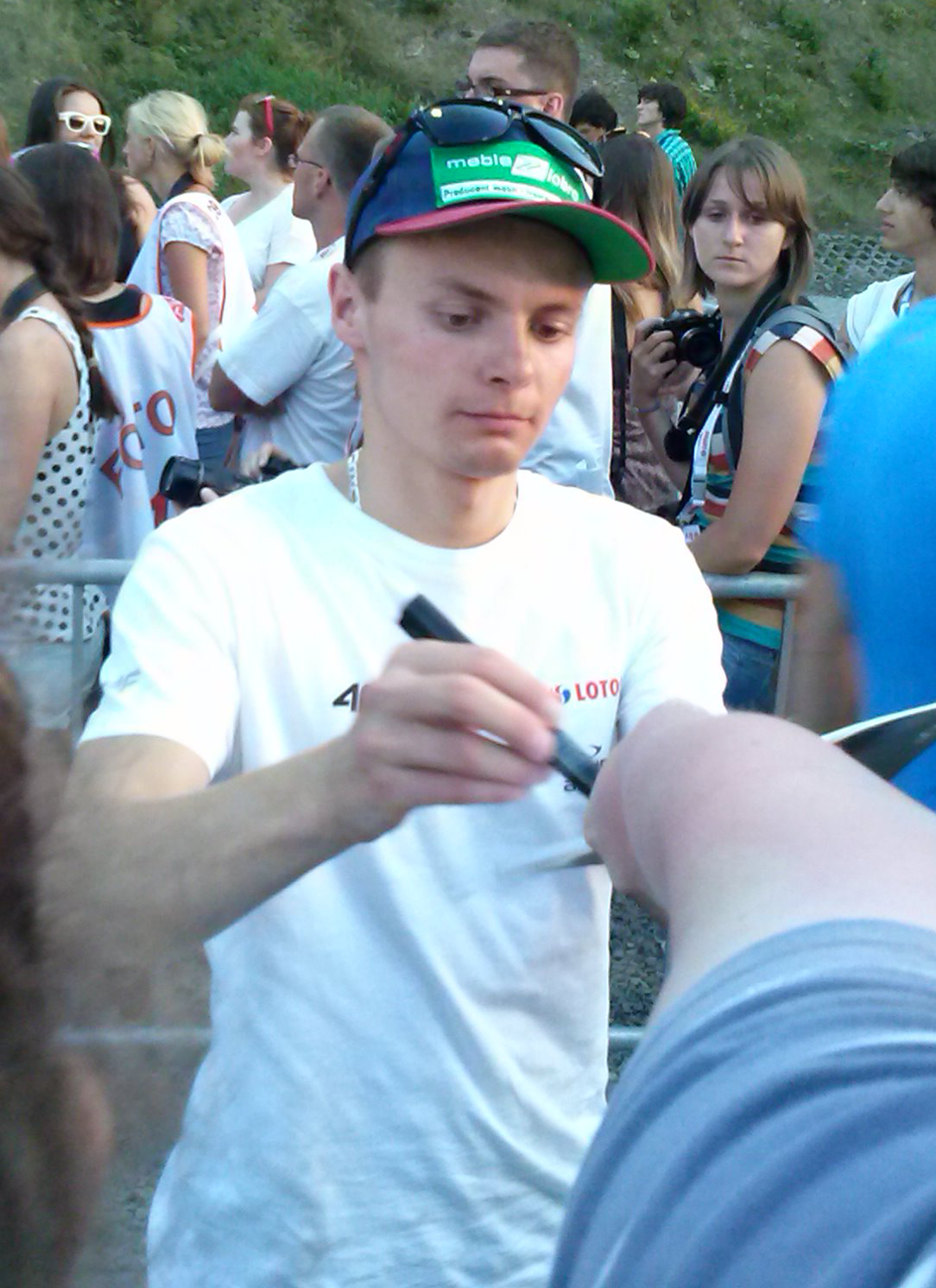
Jan Ziobro, the highest-ranked Polish jumper in the 2012–13 season

For the normal hill competitions in Vikersund, Norway, held on 8–9 March, 8 Polish jumpers participated. They were Jan Ziobro, Klemens Murańka, Krzysztof Biegun, Aleksander Zniszczoł, Bartłomiej Kłusek, Grzegorz Miętus, Jakub Kot, and Stanisław Biela. After the first round of the 8 March competition, Ziobro was the highest-placed, in 4th position after a jump of 115 m, tied with Maximilian Mechler. Behind him, Biegun was in 6th place with 113.5 m, and Biela was 18th with 109.5 m. Miętus was disqualified, while the remaining Polish jumpers placed between the 5th and 7th tens. After the final round, in which Biela jumped 109 m, he finished in 20th place. Biegun maintained 6th place with a jump of 115 m, and Ziobro reached the second step of the podium after the longest jump of the competition, 119.5 m.

In the second competition, only two Polish representatives scored points. After the first round, Biegun was in 20th place (108.5 m) and Miętus in 30th (107 m). After the second round, both improved their positions – Miętus moved up to 25th with a jump of 101 m, and Biegun to 12th, landing 10 meters further. Biela finished 38th, Ziobro 40th, and the remaining four Poles placed between the 5th and 7th tens.

After the competitions in Norway, three Polish jumpers improved their positions in the overall standings – Ziobro moved up from 15th to 11th, Biegun from 26th to 25th, and Biela from 124th to 108th. The positions of the remaining jumpers declined. In the second 10 of the table was still Murańka, in 20th place; however, Hula dropped out of it.

=== Nizhny Tagil (March 2013) ===
A week later, the final competitions of the Continental Cup were held in Nizhny Tagil. The only change in the squad compared to Vikersund was the absence of Jakub Kot. After the opening round of the first competition, the best-placed Pole was Jan Ziobro – 5th with a jump of 93.5 m, only half a point behind the two athletes tied for 3rd. Bartłomiej Kłusek and Krzysztof Biegun (both 89.5 m) were 12th, tied with Fredrik Bjerkeengen. Stanisław Biela (87 m) was 28th, while Miętus (86 m) was 29th, tied with Aleksandr Shuwalov. Klemens Murańka finished 32nd, and Aleksander Zniszczoł 37th. In the final round, Miętus recorded 89.5 m and advanced to 23rd place. Biela landed at 62 m and dropped to 30th. Biegun jumped 92.5 m and moved up to 9th, while Kłusek fell to 18th with a 90 m jump. Ziobro achieved 94 m and finished on the bottom step of the podium.

In the last competition of the season, all Poles qualified for the second round except for Stanisław Biela, who was 43rd. The highest-placed was Kłusek in 2nd after a 97 m jump, four points behind leader Rok Justin. Ziobro was 12th (93.5 m), tied with two others, while Miętus (92.5 m) and Biegun (93 m) shared 16th. Zniszczoł was 26th (89.5 m), and Murańka 27th (89 m). In the final round, Murańka jumped 87.5 m and dropped to 28th, tied with Mikhail Maksimochkin. Zniszczoł held on to 26th with 87 m. Both Miętus and Biegun improved from 16th – Miętus to 11th (93 m), Biegun to 9th (94 m, tied with Jan Mayländer). Jan Ziobro ultimately finished 8th with a 96.5 m jump, while Kłusek placed 6th with 91.5 m.

=== Final standings ===
After the competitions in Russia, Jan Ziobro moved into the top 10 in the final standings of the 2012–13 Continental Cup season. He finished 8th with a total of 548 points. He was the only Pole in the top 20 of this ranking, as Klemens Murańka dropped from 20th to 21st, and Stefan Hula from 21st to 22nd. Krzysztof Biegun advanced from 25th to 23rd, Bartłomiej Kłusek from 52nd to 39th, and Grzegorz Miętus from 71st to 63rd. The positions of the remaining Polish athletes did not change significantly.

== Standings in the general classification ==
Place	Athlete	Points	Deficit	Change
8.	Jan Ziobro	548	-119	+65
21.	Klemens Murańka	350	-317	+16
22.	Stefan Hula	339	-328	–
23.	Krzysztof Biegun	324	-343	NQ
35.	Łukasz Rutkowski	192	-475	NQ
39.	Bartłomiej Kłusek	154	-513	-8
43.	Aleksander Zniszczoł	144	-523	-22
63.	Grzegorz Miętus	90	-577	+9
81.	Andrzej Zapotoczny	55	-612	+38
100.	Marcin Bachleda	24	-643	-17
104.	Rafał Śliż	23	-644	+18
109.	Jakub Kot	18	-649	-35
111.	Stanisław Biela	16	-651	DNS

== Podium finishes ==
No.	Date	Place	Ski jumping hill	Hill size	Athele	1st jump	2nd jump	Points	Position	Deficit	Winner	Source
1.	8 December 2012	(Kazakhstan) Almaty	Sunkar International Ski Jumping Complex	K-125	Klemens Murańka	131.5 m	128.5 m	262.6	2nd	16.0	Stefan Kraft	
2.	9 December 2012	(Kazakhstan) Almaty	Sunkar International Ski Jumping Complex	K-125	Klemens Murańka	129.5 m	133.0 m	267.8	2nd	3.8	Stefan Kraft	
3.	27 December 2012	(Switzerland) Engelberg	Gross-Titlis-Schanze	K-125	Jan Ziobro	115.5 m	124.0 m	233.9	3rd	14.0	Stefan Kraft	
4.	28 December 2012	(Switzerland) Engelberg	Gross-Titlis-Schanze	K-125	Stefan Hula	132.5 m	130.0 m	250.0	2nd	5.0	Martin Schmitt	
5.	3 February 2013	(Slovenia) Planica	Bloudkova velikanka	K-125	Stefan Hula	128.5 m	125.5 m	245.0	2nd	3.0	Stefan Kraft	
6.	3 February 2013	(Slovenia) Planica	Bloudkova velikanka	K-125	Stefan Hula	129.0 m	130.0 m	245.7	1st	–	–	
7.	23 February 2013	(Poland) Wisła	Malinka	K-120	Krzysztof Biegun	124.5 m	124.0 m	245.8	3rd	6.8	Danny Queck	
8.	24 February 2013	(Poland) Wisła	Malinka	K-120	Jan Ziobro	124.5 m	126.5 m	247.8	3rd	6.0	Atle Pedersen Rønsen	
9.	16 March 2013	(Russia) Nizhny Tagil	Tramplin Stork	K-90	Jan Ziobro	93.5 m	94.0 m	237.5	3rd	13.0	Rok Justin	

== Placements in individual Continental Cup competitions ==
Jan Ziobro
Almaty	Almaty	Engelberg	Engelberg	Zakopane	Zakopane	Sapporo	Sapporo	Sapporo	Bischofshofen	Bischofshofen	Titisee-Neustadt	Titisee-Neustadt	Kranj	Kranj	Iron Mountain	Iron Mountain	Iron Mountain	Brotterode	Brotterode	Wisła	Wisła	Liberec	Liberec	Vikersund	Vikersund	Nizhny Tagil	Nizhny Tagil	Points
31	33	3	42	31	7	–	–	–	7	5	26	26	10	20	–	–	–	–	–	6	3	13	8	2	40	3	8	548
Klemens Murańka
Almaty	Almaty	Engelberg	Engelberg	Zakopane	Zakopane	Sapporo	Sapporo	Sapporo	Bischofshofen	Bischofshofen	Titisee-Neustadt	Titisee-Neustadt	Kranj	Kranj	Iron Mountain	Iron Mountain	Iron Mountain	Brotterode	Brotterode	Wisła	Wisła	Liberec	Liberec	Vikersund	Vikersund	Nizhny Tagil	Nizhny Tagil	Points
2	2	–	–	6	5	–	–	–	–	–	–	–	–	–	21	14	5	–	–	–	–	15	18	62	61	32	28	350
Stefan Hula
Almaty	Almaty	Engelberg	Engelberg	Zakopane	Zakopane	Sapporo	Sapporo	Sapporo	Bischofshofen	Bischofshofen	Titisee-Neustadt	Titisee-Neustadt	Kranj	Kranj	Iron Mountain	Iron Mountain	Iron Mountain	Brotterode	Brotterode	Wisła	Wisła	Liberec	Liberec	Vikersund	Vikersund	Nizhny Tagil	Nizhny Tagil	Points
40	34	18	2	–	–	–	–	–	10	23	8	34	–	–	–	–	–	–	–	–	–	–	–	–	–	–	–	339
Krzysztof Biegun
Almaty	Almaty	Engelberg	Engelberg	Zakopane	Zakopane	Sapporo	Sapporo	Sapporo	Bischofshofen	Bischofshofen	Titisee-Neustadt	Titisee-Neustadt	Kranj	Kranj	Iron Mountain	Iron Mountain	Iron Mountain	Brotterode	Brotterode	Wisła	Wisła	Liberec	Liberec	Vikersund	Vikersund	Nizhny Tagil	Nizhny Tagil	Points
–	–	–	–	DSQ	19	–	–	–	–	–	–	–	–	–	20	7	17	–	–	3	10	8	5	6	9	9	9	305
Aleksander Zniszczoł
Almaty	Almaty	Engelberg	Engelberg	Zakopane	Zakopane	Sapporo	Sapporo	Sapporo	Bischofshofen	Bischofshofen	Titisee-Neustadt	Titisee-Neustadt	Kranj	Kranj	Iron Mountain	Iron Mountain	Iron Mountain	Brotterode	Brotterode	Wisła	Wisła	Liberec	Liberec	Vikersund	Vikersund	Nizhny Tagil	Nizhny Tagil	Points
8	DSQ	–	–	14	30	–	–	–	–	–	–	–	–	–	7	27	27	–	–	55	24	9	9	37	26	26	37	220
Łukasz Rutkowski
Almaty	Almaty	Engelberg	Engelberg	Zakopane	Zakopane	Sapporo	Sapporo	Sapporo	Bischofshofen	Bischofshofen	Titisee-Neustadt	Titisee-Neustadt	Kranj	Kranj	Iron Mountain	Iron Mountain	Iron Mountain	Brotterode	Brotterode	Wisła	Wisła	Liberec	Liberec	Vikersund	Vikersund	Nizhny Tagil	Nizhny Tagil	Points
–	–	19	16	18	15	–	–	–	46	33	62	30	17	22	–	–	–	17	9	33	15	–	–	–	–	–	–	203
Bartłomiej Kłusek
Almaty	Almaty	Engelberg	Engelberg	Zakopane	Zakopane	Sapporo	Sapporo	Sapporo	Bischofshofen	Bischofshofen	Titisee-Neustadt	Titisee-Neustadt	Kranj	Kranj	Iron Mountain	Iron Mountain	Iron Mountain	Brotterode	Brotterode	Wisła	Wisła	Liberec	Liberec	Vikersund	Vikersund	Nizhny Tagil	Nizhny Tagil	Points
–	–	–	–	61	11	–	–	–	–	–	–	–	–	–	13	18	12	–	–	18	34	22	56	18	68	18	6	154
Grzegorz Miętus
Almaty	Almaty	Engelberg	Engelberg	Zakopane	Zakopane	Sapporo	Sapporo	Sapporo	Bischofshofen	Bischofshofen	Titisee-Neustadt	Titisee-Neustadt	Kranj	Kranj	Iron Mountain	Iron Mountain	Iron Mountain	Brotterode	Brotterode	Wisła	Wisła	Liberec	Liberec	Vikersund	Vikersund	Nizhny Tagil	Nizhny Tagil	Points
–	–	–	–	50	40	–	–	–	–	–	–	–	–	–	17	40	38	41	30	9	23	11	25	62	DSQ	30	43	105
Andrzej Zapotoczny
Almaty	Almaty	Engelberg	Engelberg	Zakopane	Zakopane	Sapporo	Sapporo	Sapporo	Bischofshofen	Bischofshofen	Titisee-Neustadt	Titisee-Neustadt	Kranj	Kranj	Iron Mountain	Iron Mountain	Iron Mountain	Brotterode	Brotterode	Wisła	Wisła	Liberec	Liberec	Vikersund	Vikersund	Nizhny Tagil	Nizhny Tagil	Points
–	–	54	67	51	45	20	11	19	26	62	41	48	70	56	–	–	–	DSQ	28	–	–	–	–	–	–	–	–	90
Jakub Kot
Almaty	Almaty	Engelberg	Engelberg	Zakopane	Zakopane	Sapporo	Sapporo	Sapporo	Bischofshofen	Bischofshofen	Titisee-Neustadt	Titisee-Neustadt	Kranj	Kranj	Iron Mountain	Iron Mountain	Iron Mountain	Brotterode	Brotterode	Wisła	Wisła	Liberec	Liberec	Vikersund	Vikersund	Nizhny Tagil	Nizhny Tagil	Points
–	–	82	DSQ	53	38	30	27	41	52	24	46	64	60	25	–	–	–	37	51	–	–	–	–	–	–	–	–	36
Marcin Bachleda
Almaty	Almaty	Engelberg	Engelberg	Zakopane	Zakopane	Sapporo	Sapporo	Sapporo	Bischofshofen	Bischofshofen	Titisee-Neustadt	Titisee-Neustadt	Kranj	Kranj	Iron Mountain	Iron Mountain	Iron Mountain	Brotterode	Brotterode	Wisła	Wisła	Liberec	Liberec	Vikersund	Vikersund	Nizhny Tagil	Nizhny Tagil	Points
–	–	–	–	11	54	–	–	–	–	–	–	–	–	–	–	–	–	–	–	–	–	–	–	–	–	–	–	20
Stanisław Biela
Almaty	Almaty	Engelberg	Engelberg	Zakopane	Zakopane	Sapporo	Sapporo	Sapporo	Bischofshofen	Bischofshofen	Titisee-Neustadt	Titisee-Neustadt	Kranj	Kranj	Iron Mountain	Iron Mountain	Iron Mountain	Brotterode	Brotterode	Wisła	Wisła	Liberec	Liberec	Vikersund	Vikersund	Nizhny Tagil	Nizhny Tagil	Points
46	28	–	–	64	DSQ	48	36	30	58	49	–	–	–	–	34	40	37	–	–	–	–	59	75	–	–	30	43	7
Rafał Śliż
Almaty	Almaty	Engelberg	Engelberg	Zakopane	Zakopane	Sapporo	Sapporo	Sapporo	Bischofshofen	Bischofshofen	Titisee-Neustadt	Titisee-Neustadt	Kranj	Kranj	Iron Mountain	Iron Mountain	Iron Mountain	Brotterode	Brotterode	Wisła	Wisła	Liberec	Liberec	Vikersund	Vikersund	Nizhny Tagil	Nizhny Tagil	Points
–	–	–	–	58	75	–	–	–	–	–	DSQ	13	9	28	–	–	–	–	–	–	–	–	–	–	–	–	–	28
Tomasz Byrt
Almaty	Almaty	Engelberg	Engelberg	Zakopane	Zakopane	Sapporo	Sapporo	Sapporo	Bischofshofen	Bischofshofen	Titisee-Neustadt	Titisee-Neustadt	Kranj	Kranj	Iron Mountain	Iron Mountain	Iron Mountain	Brotterode	Brotterode	Wisła	Wisła	Liberec	Liberec	Vikersund	Vikersund	Nizhny Tagil	Nizhny Tagil	Points
–	–	–	–	DSQ	DSQ	–	–	–	–	–	–	–	–	–	–	–	–	–	–	–	–	–	–	–	–	–	–	0
