= Rune André Østby =

Norwegian alpine skier (born 1973)

Rune André Østby (born 1973) is a Norwegian alpine skier.

He competed in two events at the 1991 Junior World Championships, and then four events at the 1992 Junior World Championships. His best placement was 7th in the 1992 slalom.

He made his World Cup debut in December 1994 in Tignes, and competed in eleven races, a 14th place from January 1996 in Flachau being his best result. He also competed in the giant slalom at the 1996 World Championships.

He represented the club Ullensaker SK.
