= Ullensaker SK =

Norwegian sports club

Logo.

Ullensaker Skiklubb is a Norwegian sports club from Ullensaker, founded in 1958. It has sections for alpine skiing, Telemark skiing, cross-country skiing, ski jumping, and biathlon.

World-level alpine skier Ole Kristian Furuseth was a member of the club. Other members include ski jumpers Kim Rene Elverum Sorsell and Jan Erik Strømberg, cross-country skier Silje Ekroll Jahren, and alpine skier Cathrine Meisingset.
