= Mitja Mežnar =

Slovenian ski jumper

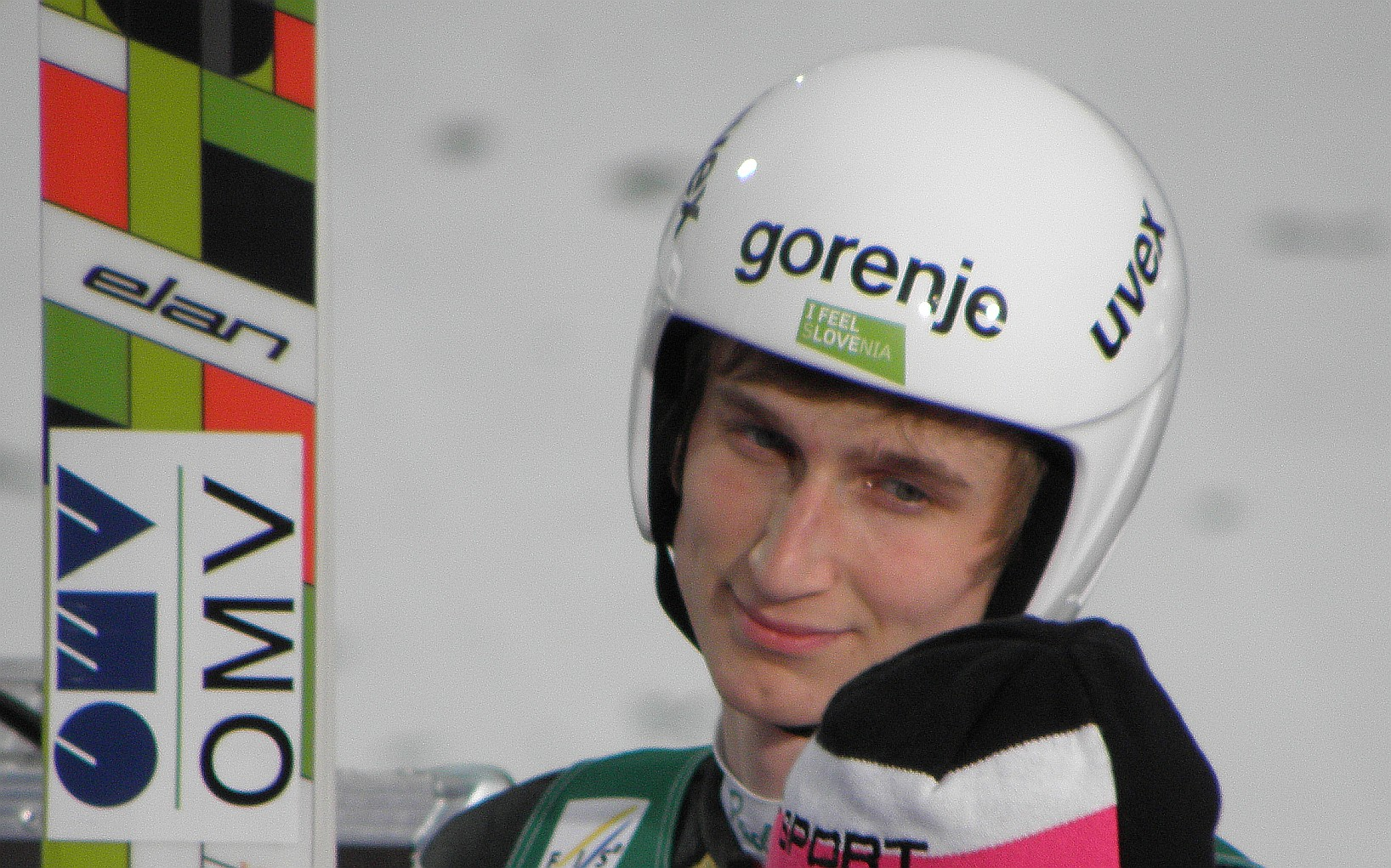
Mežnar at the 2011 World Championships

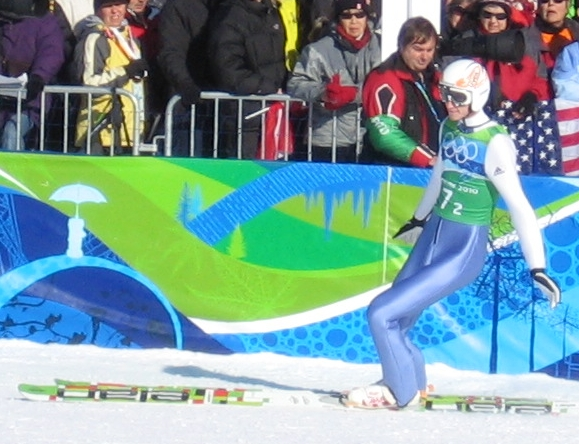
Mežnar at the 2010 Winter Olympics

Mitja Mežnar (born 30 June 1988 in Kranj) is a Slovenian ski jumper who has competed since 2003.

== Sports career ==
At the 2010 Winter Olympics in Vancouver, he finished eighth in the team large hill and 29th in the individual large hill events.

At the FIS Nordic World Ski Championships 2009 in Liberec, Mežnar finished eighth in the team large hill, 31st in the individual normal hill, and 47th in the individual large hill events.

His best World Cup finish was fifth in the team large hill event in Finland in March 2010.

On 27 May 2023 Mitja Mežnar pushed Primož Roglič forward when he had problems when the chain of his bike dropped, so that he could lead him to a historic victory at the Giro d'Italia
