= Kiremitliktepe Ski Jump =

Ski jumping venue in Turkey

Kiremitliktepe Türk Telekom Ski Jumping Towers
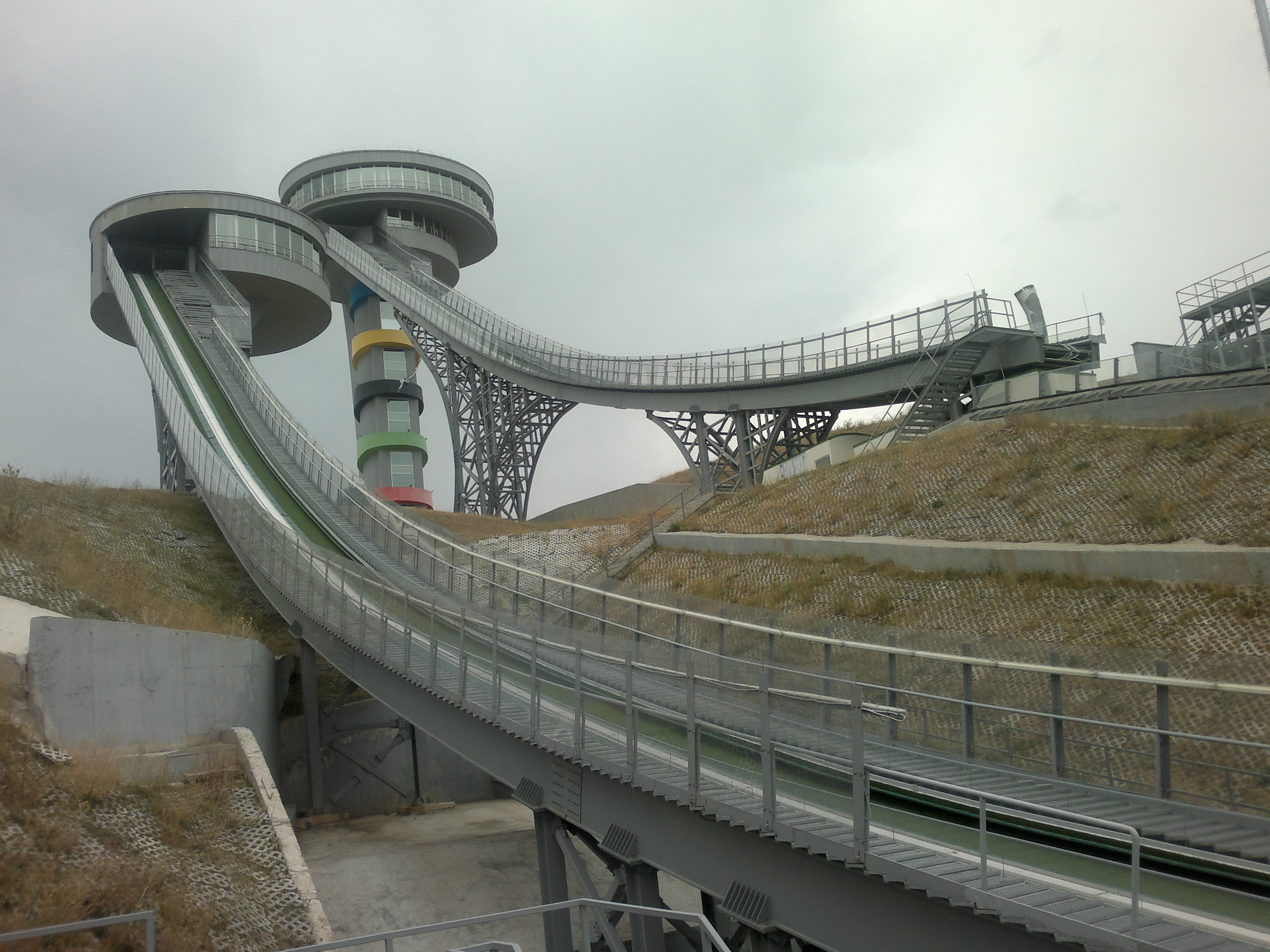
- The K-95 /left) and K-125 (right) ski jumping towers at Kiremitliktepe, Erzurum.
- Location: Erzurum; Turkey
- Coordinates: 39.89323°N 41.25202°E
- Operator: Erzurum GSİM
- Opened: September 2010

Size
- K–point: 125 m; 95 m
- Hill size: HS140 (K-125); HS109 (K-95)
- Hill record: 143.5 m (K-125); (Slovenia) Matej Dobovsek, 2011-01-29, UNI; 112.0 m (K-95); (Poland) Klemens Murańka, 2012-02-23, JWSC
- Spectator capacity: 10,000

Location of Kiremitliktepe Ski Jump in Turkey

The Kiremitliktepe Ski Jump (Turkish: Kiremitliktepe Kayakla Atlama Kuleleri), or officially Türk Telekom Ski Jumping Towers, is a ski jumping venue located on the Kiremitlik Hill at the base of Palandöken Mountain just southwest of Erzurum in eastern Turkey. Completed in September 2010, the complex consists of a large hill (K-125) and a normal hill (K-95) jumping tower, as well as three additional smaller slopes of K-65, K-40 and K-20 for training purposes and for use by young jumpers.

== Design and construction ==
The construction of the ski jumping center was part of a project of the Ministry of Youth and Sports and the Turkey Ski Federation that was needed for the realization of the 2011 Winter Universiade in Erzurum. The ski jumping facility was designed in modernist style by the Slovene architecture firm Atelje S, partner of the co-contractor MANA Original company from the same country, which won the project's international request for tender along with the Turkish Sarıdağlar construction company in March 2008.

Erzurum is located on a high plateau at 1,950 m (6,400 ft) AMSL in Eastern Anatolia region. The Kiremitliktepe Ski Jump, situated on the highway D.950 about 3 km (1.9 mi) southwest of the city, is at the base of Palandöken Mountain that rise up to 3,271 m (10,732 ft) altitude.

The center with five ski jumping slopes covers an area of 30 ha (74 acres). The two Olympic-size towers has cylindrical structures at the top. The 43 m (141 ft) tall main tower has five ring structures on it with the colors of Olympic rings symbolizing the Olympic sprit. Atop the main tower, a restaurant is situated.

The construction, carried out by the Sarıdağlar company, was completed within ten months, and the sport complex opened in September 2010. It cost €20 million. The venue was renamed in January 2011 after the Turkish telecommunications company Türk Telekom, the main sponsor of the 2011 Winter Universiade. Its new name will be lasting until 2016.

=== 2014 landslide ===
On July 15, 2014, there was a huge landslide on the Kiremitlik Hill with the result that hills were severely damaged. On investigation it was noted that the construction completely lacked foundations, the ski slopes and seating being laid directly onto bare earth. Due to the collapse, the future of the Kiremitliktepe Ski Jump and also of ski jumping in Turkey became doubtful. However, the ski runs were competently rebuilt using proper foundations and the facilities were operating again by 2018, hosting international events.

== Facilities ==
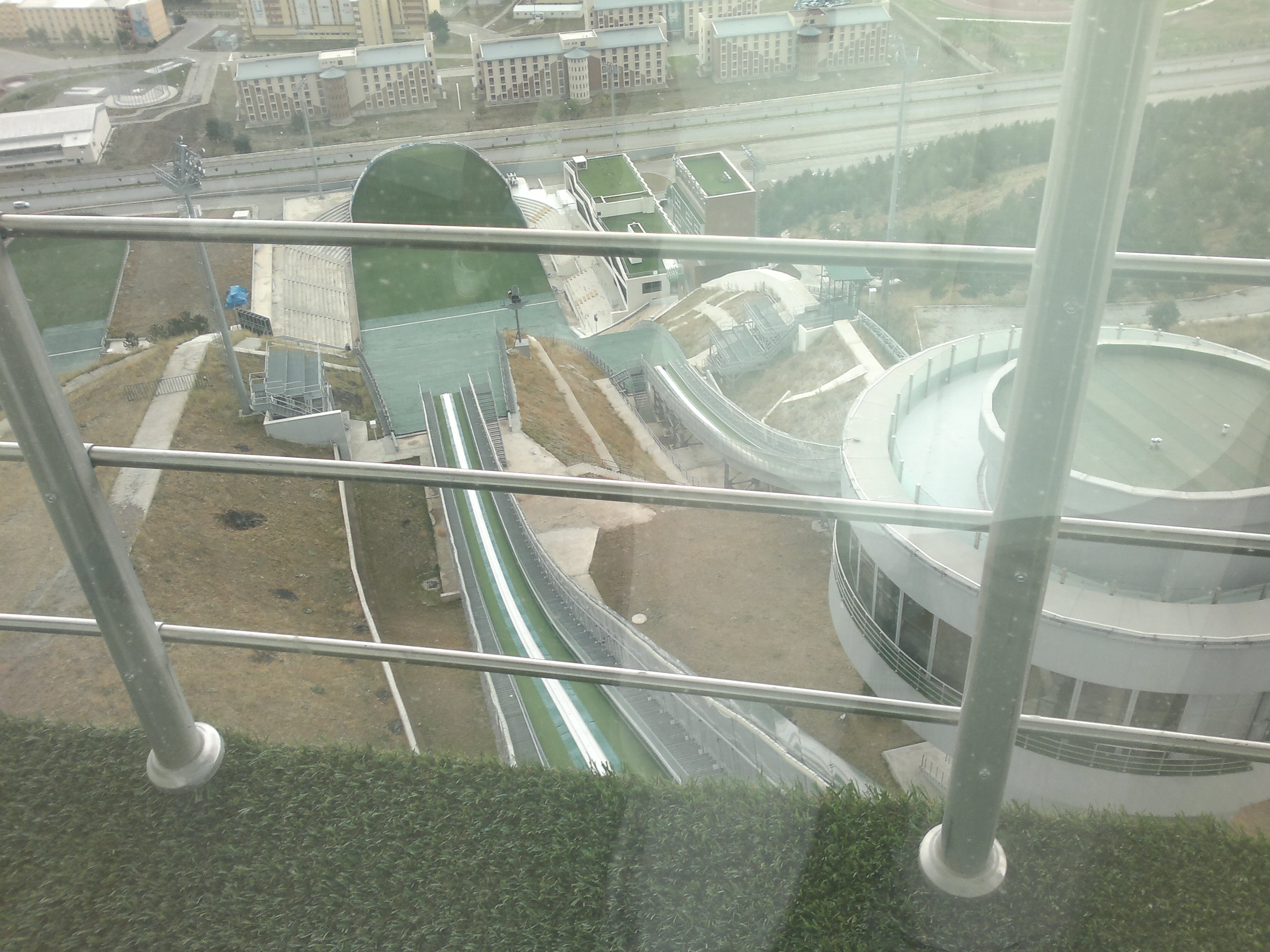
K125 inrun (left), K-95 inrun (right) and landing area with bleachers around as seen from the main tower of Kiremitliktepe Ski Jump.

The multi-purpose facility allows organization of ski jumping events at highest level year around. The high-tech ice-ceramic track inruns and plastic matt covered ski-jump landing area enable equal competition conditions in winter season as well as during the rest of the year irrespectively of the weather. The venue has 10,000 spectator capacity.

The complex offers accommodation in the hotel near the large hill and in the bungalows on top of the center, and catering in the restaurant atop the main ski jump tower. There is a gym hall for training, and saunas and massage pools for relaxation.

Also during the time when no competitions are held, the facility attracts local population and tourists for recreation activities and social events at the hotel restaurant and the restaurant atop the 43m-high tower, which offers a panoramic view of the entire city.

=== Large hill ===
The large hill has a K-point of 125 and a hill size of 140 with a 43.47 m (142.6 ft) high jumping tower. It has a 99 m (325 ft) long inrun with an angle of 35°, a take-off angle of 11°, which is 7 m (23 ft) long and 3 m (9.8 ft) high. The slope for the landing is 34.57°. The total height is 136.8 m (449 ft).

Hill record was set with 143.5 m by Matej Dobovsek from Slovenia at the 2011 Winter Universiade on January 29, 2011.

=== Normal hill ===
The normal hill's K-point is 95 and hill size 109. It has a jumping tower of 20.98 m (68.8 ft) height. The inrun is 88 m (289 ft) long at an angle of 35°. The take-off length is 6.5 m (21 ft), the height 2.5 m (8.2 ft) with an angle of 10.5°. The landing's angle is 34.25°. The normal hill has a total height of 107.1 m (351 ft).

Aleksander Zniszczoł from Poland set a hill record with 111.5 m at the FIS Junior World Ski Championships on February 21, 2012. Women's record belongs to Japanese Sara Takanashi with 110.5 m set at same event on the same day.

== Events hosted ==
The first international event, which took place at the Kiremitliktepe Ski Jump, was the FIS Ski Jumping Continental Cup on December 18-19, 2010. The next competition was the Winter Universiade held from January 28 to February 3, 2011. The venue hosted again the FIS Ski Jumping Continental Cup's ski jumping event in December 2011 and Nordic combined event in January 2012. The 2012 FIS Junior World Ski Championships were held at the ski jumping facility from February 22 to 25.
