= Kim Rene Elverum Sorsell =

Norwegian ski jumper

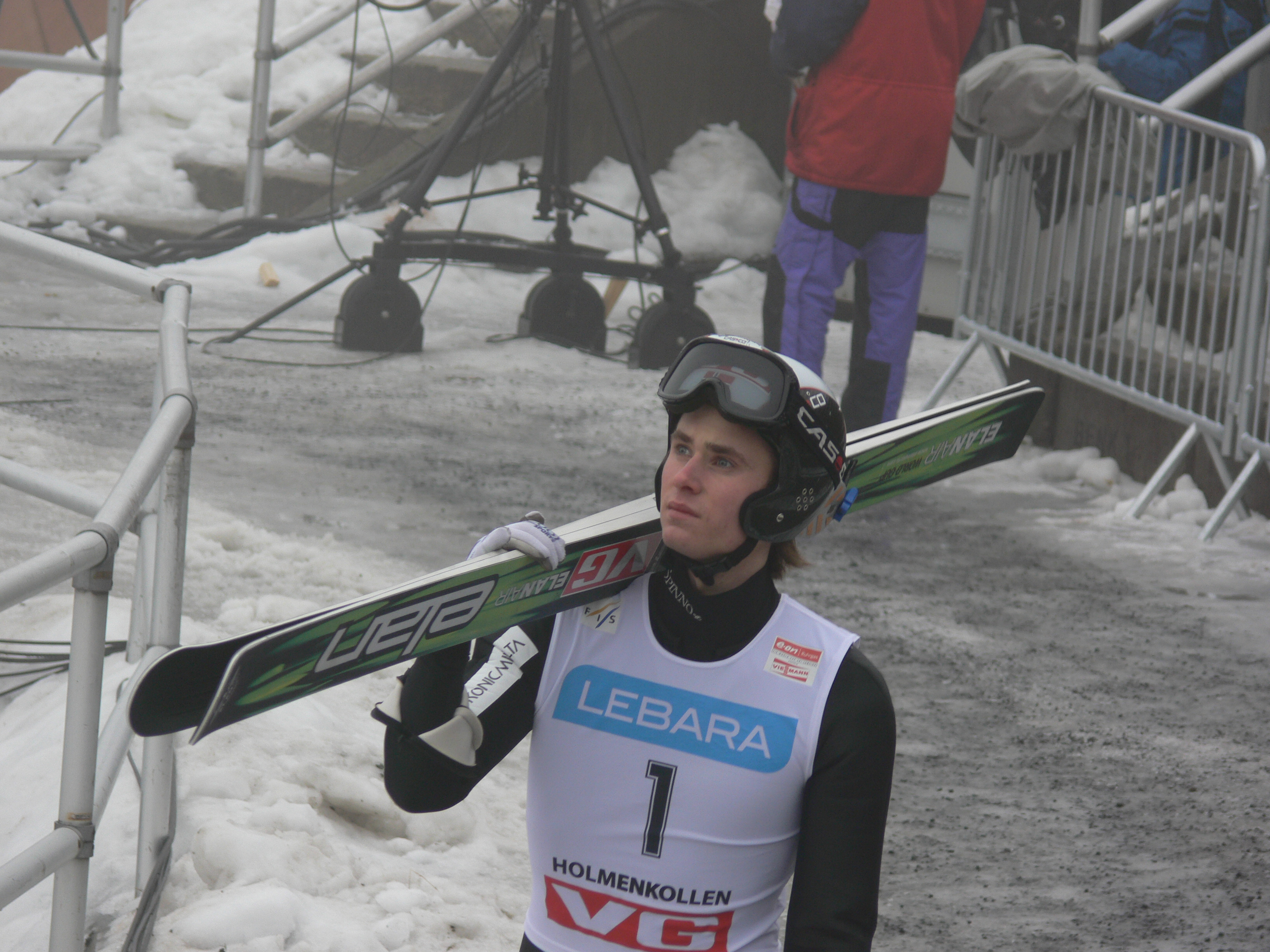

Personal information
- Full name: Kim Rene Elverum Sorsell
- Born: 6 October 1988 (age 37) Norway

Sport
- Sport: Skiing
- Club: Ullensaker SK

World Cup career
- Seasons: 2007-present
- Indiv. podiums: 0
- Indiv. wins: 0
- Updated on 4 December 2010

Kim Rene Elverum Sorsell (born 6 October 1988) is a Norwegian ski jumper.

He made his debut in the World Cup in December 2007 in Trondheim, where he finished 43rd. His first finished among the top 30 in the World Cup with a 22nd place from December 2008 in Trondheim, and among the top 20 with a 17th place in January 2009 in Sapporo. The 2009–10 season was more meagre, but in the 2010–11 World Cup opener he finished 24th in Lillehammer.

He hails from Frogner, Akershus, and represents Ullensaker SK.
