= Jan Ziobro (ski jumper) =

Polish ski jumper

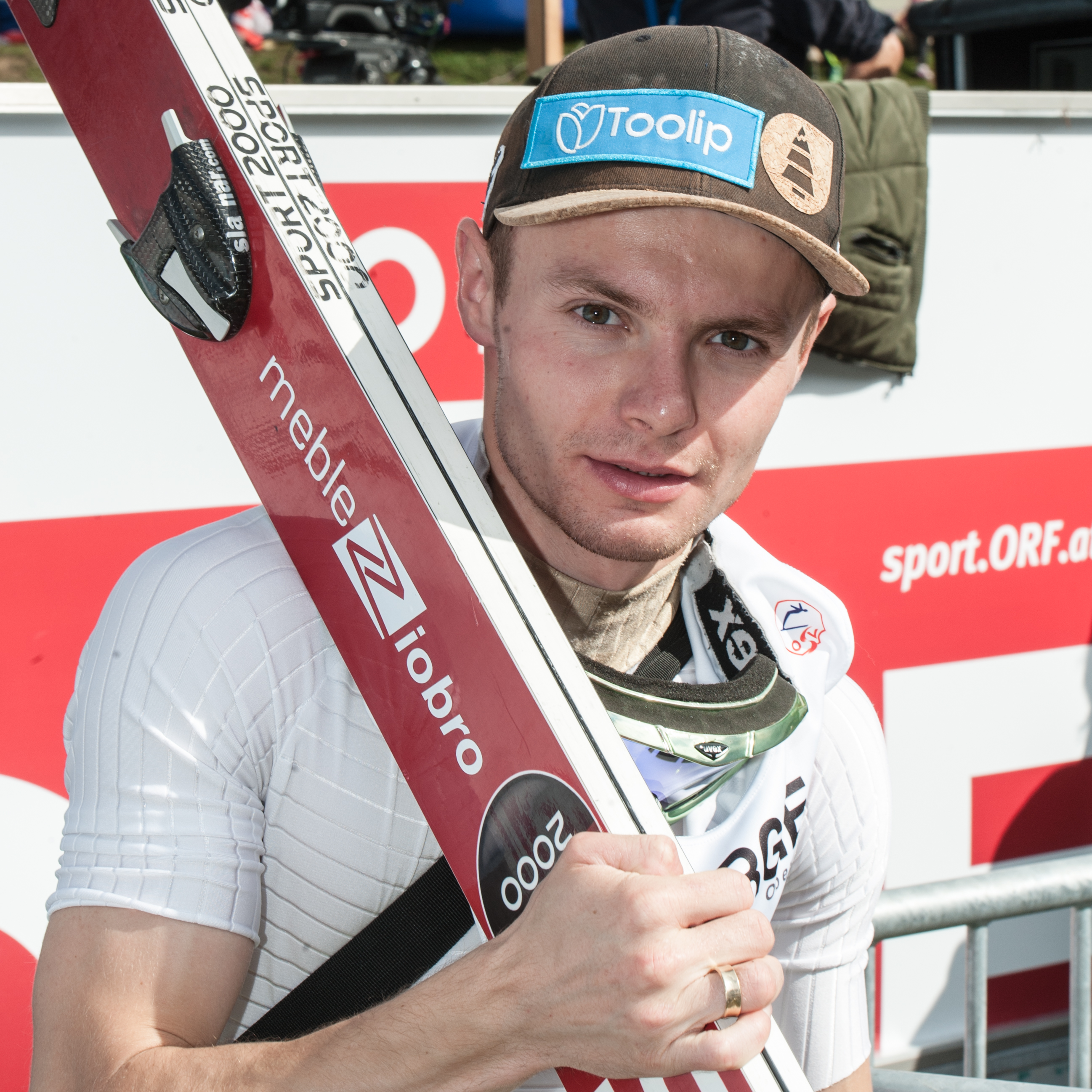

Personal information
- Full name: Jan Ziobro
- Nationality: Poland
- Born: 24 June 1991 (age 35) Rabka-Zdrój, Poland

Sport
- Sport: Skiing
- Club: WKS Zakopane

World Cup career
- Seasons: 2011–2018
- Indiv. starts: 76
- Indiv. podiums: 2
- Indiv. wins: 1

Achievements and titles
- Personal bests: 216 m (709 ft); Oberstdorf, 4 Feb 2017
Medal record
Men's ski jumping
World Championships
Bronze medal – third place	2015 Falun	Team LH
- Updated on 19 March 2017

Jan Ziobro (Polish pronunciation: [ˈjan ˈʑɔbrɔ], born 24 June 1991) is a Polish former ski jumper, a member of the national team, a participant of the 2014 Winter Olympic Games, a bronze medalist at 2015 World Championship in team.

== Personal life ==
Jan Ziobro was born in Rabka Zdrój, Poland and raised in Spytkowice. He has a sister and four brothers. His brother-in-law is former ski jumper Krystian Długopolski. Ziobro works as a painter for his family's furniture company, Meble Ziobro, which sponsors him and Czech Jakub Janda. In August 2013, he proposed to his girlfriend Angelika Kowalczyk. On September 20, 2014, they married in a private ceremony in Spytkowice. They have two daughters, born in 2014 and 2016.

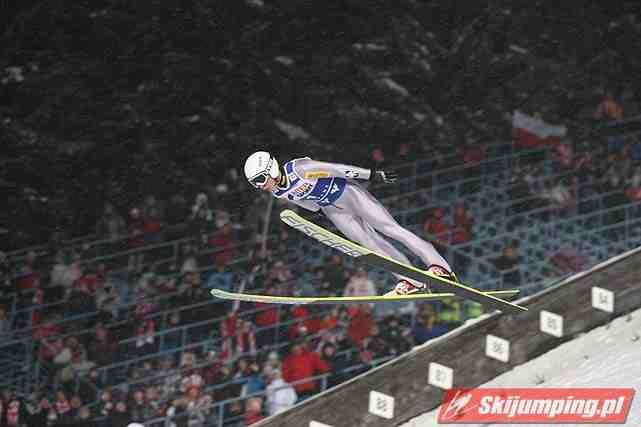
Jan Ziobro during qualification round of FIS Ski Jumping World Cup in Zakopane, 2012.

== Career ==
Ziobro made his first appearance in the FIS Ski Jumping World Cup on November 27, 2011, in Kuusamo.

=== 2013/2014 ===
He won his first World Cup event on December 21, 2013, in Engelberg, while his countryman Kamil Stoch finished second. On that day he also equaled the hill's record with his jump of 141 meters. A day later, Ziobro landed on the podium again, finishing third as Stoch won. It was the first time in ski jumping history that two Poles finished on the podium in two consecutive contests.

Ziobro competed at the 2014 Winter Olympics in Sochi. In the men's normal hill individual event, he finished in 13th place. He was 15th on the large hill and 4th in the team event.

=== 2014/2015 ===
Ziobro debuted in the World Championships 2015 in Falun, Sweden. He was 8th in the competition on the normal hill Lugnet (K-90). On February 28, 2015, Polish team in squad: Ziobro, Kamil Stoch, Piotr Żyła and Klemens Murańka achieved bronze medal of World Championships 2015 in team.

== Olympic Games ==
=== Individual ===
2014 (Russia) Sochi/Krasnaya Polyana	–	13th place (K-90), 15th place (K-125)

=== Team ===
2014 (Russia) Sochi/Krasnaya Polyana	–	4th place

=== Jan Ziobro's starts at Olympic Games ===
Place	Day	Year	Locality	Hill	Point K	HS	Competition	Jump 1	Jump 2	Note (points)	Lost (points)	Winner
13.	February 9	2014	Krasnaya Polyana	RusSki Gorki	K-95	HS-106	individual	101.0 m	99.0 m	252.4	25.6	Kamil Stoch
15.	February 15	2014	Krasnaya Polyana	RusSki Gorki	K-125	HS-140	individual	128.5 m	129.5 m	246.6	32.1	Kamil Stoch
4.	February 17	2014	Krasnaya Polyana	RusSki Gorki	K-125	HS-140	team	130.5 m	133.0 m	1011.8 (257.5)	29.3	Germany

== World Championships ==
=== Individual ===
2015 (Sweden) Falun	–	8th place (K-90)

=== Team ===
2015 (Sweden) Falun	–	bronze medal (K-120)

=== Jan Ziobro's starts at World Championships ===
Place	Day	Year	Locality	Hill	Point K	HS	Competition	Jump 1	Jump 2	Note (points)	Loss (points)	Winner
8.	21 February	2015	Falun	Lugnet	K-90	HS-100	individual	91.5 m	91.5 m	228.6	24.1	Rune Velta
3.	28 February	2015	Falun	Lugnet	K-120	HS-134	team	116.0	125.5	848.1 (192.8)	44.5	Norway

== World Cup ==
=== Season standings ===
Season	Overall	Ski-Flying	Four Hills Tournament	Raw Air
2011–12	—	—	—	—
2012–13	65	—	—	—
2013–14	25	24	22	—
2014–15	50	—	66	—
2015–16	—	—	—	—
2016–17	31	27	31	58

=== Individual starts ===
Season	1	2	3	4	5	6	7	8	9	10	11	12	13	14	15	16	17	18	19	20	21	22	23	24	25	26	27	28	29	30	31	Points
2010/11	Kuusamo	Kuopio	Lillehammer	Lillehammer	Engelberg	Engelberg	Engelberg	Oberstdorf	Garmisch-Partenkirchen	Innsbruck	Bischofshofen	Harrachov	Harrachov	Sapporo	Sapporo	Zakopane	Zakopane	Zakopane	Willingen	Klingenthal	Oberstdorf	Vikersund	Vikersund	Lahti	Planica	Planica						0
2010/11	–	–	–	–	–	–	–	–	–	–	–	–	–	–	–	q	–	–	–	–	–	–	–	–	–	–						0
2011/12	Kuusamo	Lillehammer	Lillehammer	Harrachov	Harrachov	Engelberg	Engelberg	Oberstdorf	Garmisch-Partenkirchen	Innsbruck	Bischofshofen	Bad Mitterndorf	Bad Mitterndorf	Zakopane	Zakopane	Sapporo	Sapporo	Predazzo	Predazzo	Willingen	Oberstdorf	Lahti	Trondheim	Oslo	Planica	Planica						0
2011/12	46	39	49	q	48	44	q	–	–	–	–	–	–	q	–	–	–	–	–	–	–	–	–	–	–	–						0
2012/13	Lillehammer	Lillehammer	Kuusamo	Krasnaja Polana	Krasnaja Polana	Engelberg	Engelberg	Oberstdorf	Garmisch-Partenkirchen	Innsbruck	Bischofshofen	Wisła	Zakopane	Sapporo	Sapporo	Vikersund	Vikersund	Harrachov	Harrachov	Klingenthal	Oberstdorf	Lahti	Kuopio	Trondheim	Oslo	Planica	Planica					11
2012/13	–	–	–	–	–	–	–	–	–	–	–	q	20	–	–	–	–	–	–	–	–	–	–	–	–	–	–					11
2013/14	Klingenthal	Kuusamo	Lillehammer	Lillehammer	Titisee-Neustadt	Titisee-Neustadt	Engelberg	Engelberg	Oberstdorf	Garmisch-Partenkirchen	Innsbruck	Bischofshofen	Tauplitz	Tauplitz	Wisła	Zakopane	Sapporo	Sapporo	Willingen	Willingen	Falun	Lahti	Lahti	Kuopio	Trondheim	Oslo	Planica	Planica				312
2013/14	9	37	44	44	44	48	1	3	17	33	24	24	17	30	6	21	–	–	21	38	21	q	38	q	21	43	q	47				312
2014/15	Klingenthal	Kuusamo	Kuusamo	Lillehammer	Lillehammer	Nizhny Tagil	Nizhny Tagil	Engelberg	Engelberg	Oberstdorf	Garmisch-Partenkirchen	Innsbruck	Bischofshofen	Tauplitz	Wisła	Zakopane	Sapporo	Sapporo	Willingen	Willingen	Titisee-Neustadt	Titisee-Neustadt	Vikersund	Vikersund	Lahti	Kuopio	Trondheim	Oslo	Oslo	Planica	Planica	55
2014/15	34	q	q	19	31	31	40	20	36	50	q	–	–	–	23	43	18	27	32	25	37	–	–	–	40	31	44	28	q	–	–	55
2015/16	Klingenthal	Lillehammer	Lillehammer	Nizhny Tagil	Nizhny Tagil	Engelberg	Engelberg	Oberstdorf	Garmisch-Partenkirchen	Innsbruck	Bischofshofen	Willingen	Zakopane	Sapporo	Sapporo	Trondheim	Vikersund	Vikersund	Vikersund	Lahti	Lahti	Kuopio	Almaty	Almaty	Wisła	Titisee-Neustadt	Titisee-Neustadt	Planica	Planica			0
2015/16	34	–	33	39	47	–	–	–	–	–	–	31	45	–	–	–	–	–	–	–	–	–	42	–	47	–	–	–	–			0
2016/17	Kuusamo	Kuusamo	Klingenthal	Lillehammer	Lillehammer	Engelberg	Engelberg	Oberstdorf	Garmisch-Partenkirchen	Innsbruck	Bischofshofen	Wisła	Wisła	Zakopane	Willingen	Oberstdorf	Oberstdorf	Sapporo	Sapporo	Pyeongchang	Pyeongchang	Oslo	Trondheim	Vikersund	Planica	Planica						122
2016/17	–	–	–	–	–	–	–	42	44	23	22	19	38	14	15	12	27	9	39	30	36	46	q	q	q	28						122
2017/18	Wisła	Kuusamo	Nizhny Tagil	Nizhny Tagil	Titisee-Neustadt	Engelberg	Engelberg	Oberstdorf	Garmisch-Partenkirchen	Innsbruck	Bischofshofen	Tauplitz	Tauplitz	Zakopane	Willingen	Willingen	Lahti	Oslo	Lillehammer	Trondheim	Vikersund	Planica	Planica

=== Victories ===
	Day	Year	Location	Hill	Point K	HS	Jump 1	Jump 2	Note (points)
1.	December 21	2013	Engelberg	Gross-Titlis-Schanze	K-125	HS-137	134,0 m	141,0 m	275.4

=== Podiums ===
	Day	Year	Location	Hill	Point K	HS	Jump 1	Jump 2	Note (points)	Place	Lost (points)	Winner
1.	December 21	2013	Engelberg	Gross-Titlis-Schanze	K-125	HS-137	134,0 m	141,0 m	275.4	1.	–	
2.	December 22	2013	Engelberg	Gross-Titlis-Schanze	K-125	HS-137	128,0 m	133,0 m	270.0	3.	4.7	Kamil Stoch
