= Felix Schoft =

German ski jumper (born 1990)

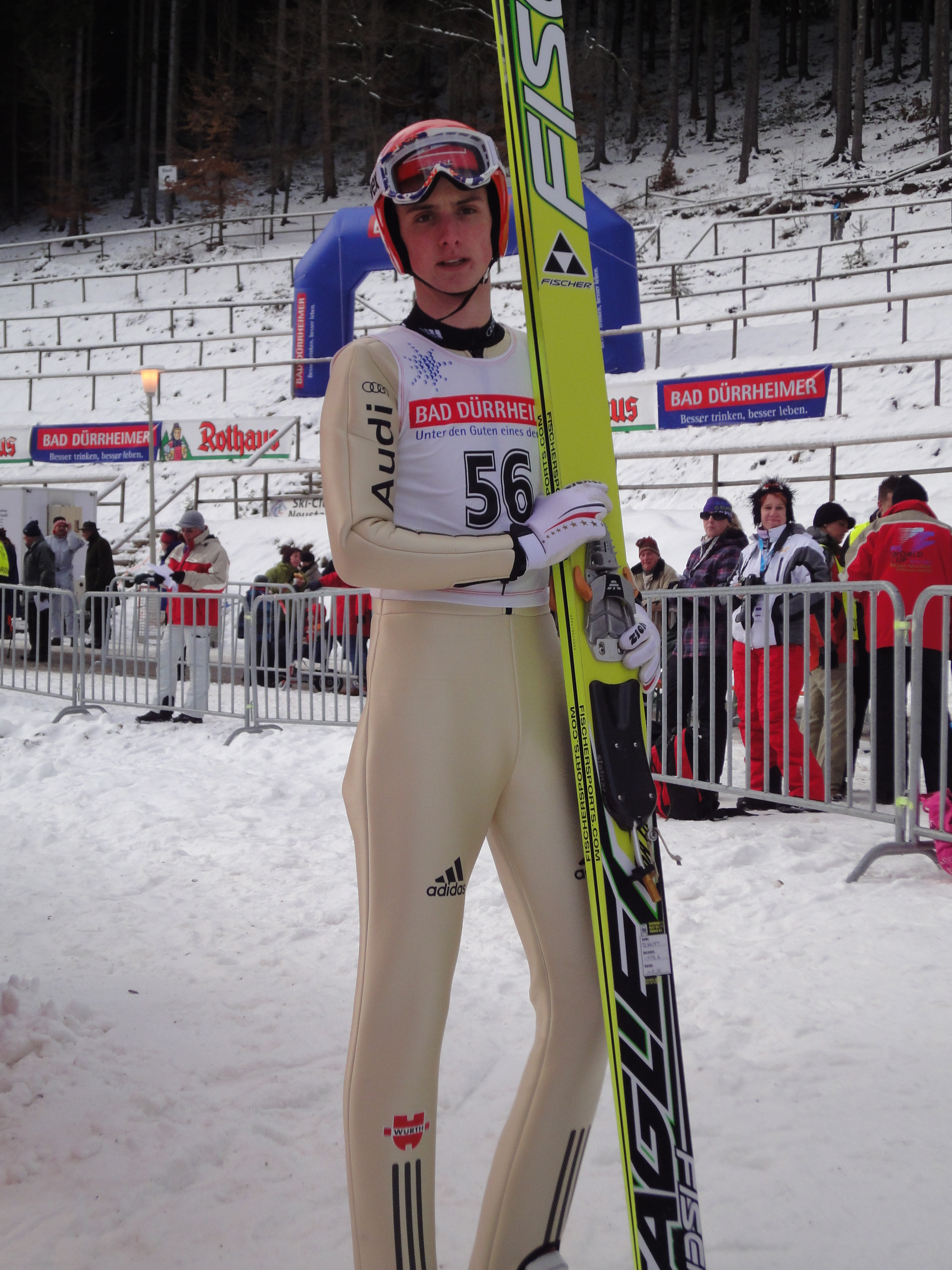

Personal information
- Full name: Felix Schoft
- Nickname: Schofti
- Born: 6 July 1990 (age 36) Germany
- Height: 6 ft 3 in (1.91 m)

Sport
- Sport: Skiing
- Club: SC Partenkirchen

World Cup career
- Seasons: 2007–present
- Indiv. podiums: 0
- Indiv. wins: 0
- Updated on 15 December 2008

Felix Schoft (born 6 July 1990) is a German ski jumper.

In the World Cup he finished once among the top 20, with a seventeenth place from Pragelato in December 2008.
