= Stefan Hula Jr. =

Polish ski jumper

Stefan Hula
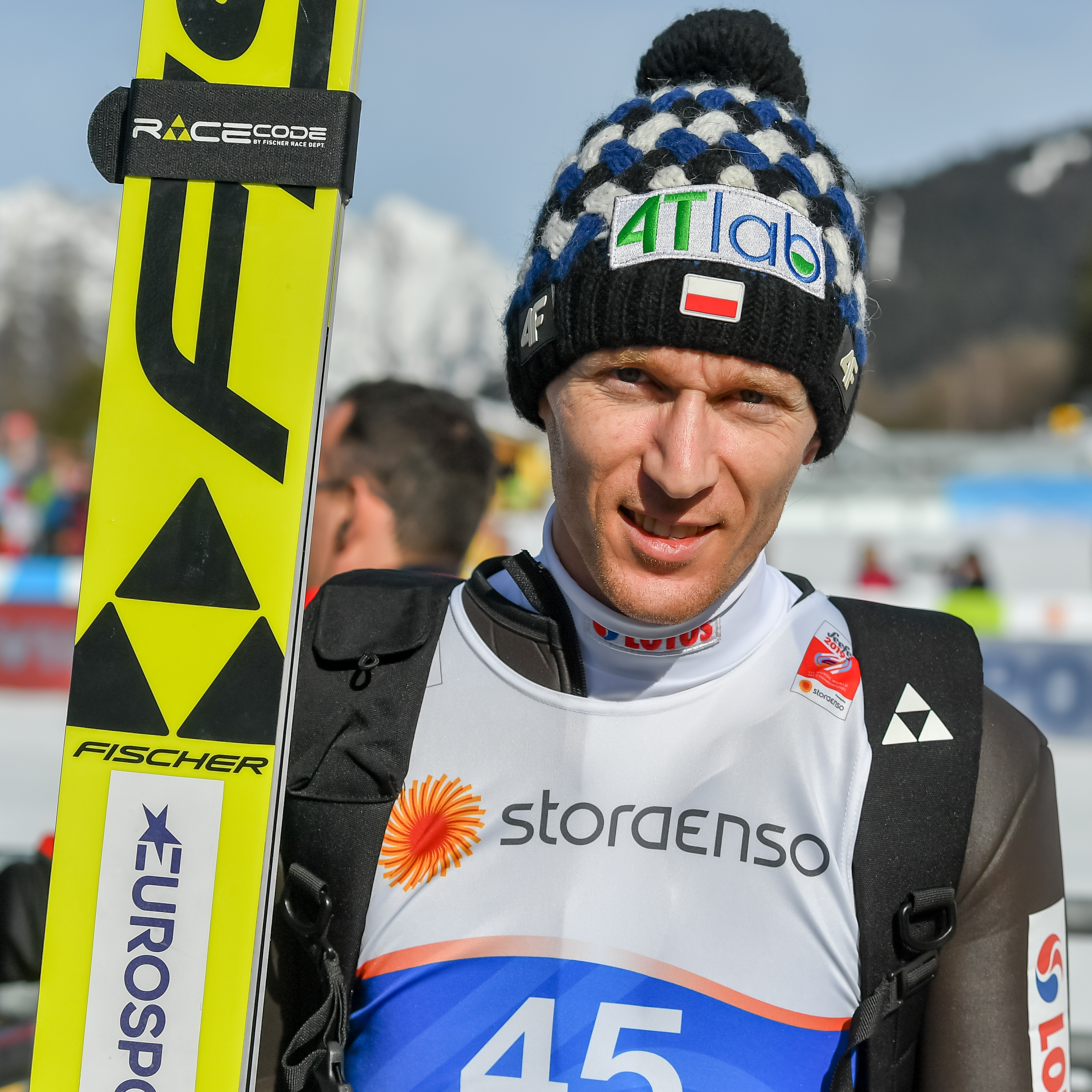
- Hula at the 2019 World Championships in Seefeld

Personal information
- Full name: Stefan Jarosław Hula
- Nationality: Poland
- Born: 29 September 1986 (age 40) Bielsko-Biała, Poland
- Height: 1.74 m (5 ft 9 in)

Sport
- Sport: Skiing
- Club: KS Eve-nement Zakopane

World Cup career
- Seasons: 2006–2023
- Indiv. starts: 208
- Team podiums: 7
- Team wins: 1

Achievements and titles
- Personal bests: 226.0 m (741.5 ft); Vikersund, 16 March 2018
Medal record
Representing Poland
Men's ski jumping
Olympic Games
Bronze medal – third place	2018 Pyeongchang	Team LH
Men's ski flying
World Championships
Bronze medal – third place	2018 Oberstdorf	Team
- Updated on 12 December 2020

Stefan Jarosław Hula (born 29 September 1986) is a Polish former ski jumper, four-time Olympian (2006, 2010, 2018 and 2022), a bronze medalist of the 2018 Olympic Games in team.

== Personal life ==
Hula was born in Bielsko-Biała, Poland. He has a brother, Przemysław, and two sisters, Katarzyna and Magdalena, who trained in sledging. His father, also named Stefan, was a former Nordic combined skier and bronze medalist at the 1974 FIS Nordic World Ski Championships in Falun.

In May 2012, he married Marcelina. Together, they run the company "Huligans", where Marcelina sews suits for ski jumpers (she sewed the suit in which Kamil Stoch won two gold medals at the Olympic Games in Sochi). They have two daughters, born in 2011 and 2017.

== Career ==
At the 2006 Ski Flying World Championships, Hula finished ninth in the team and 37th in the individual events. His best individual World Cup finish was 6th in a large hill event in Kuopio, Finland in 2016. His best individual career finish was second twice in lesser events in 2005. In season 2017/18, he beat his best result and took 5th place in Oberstdorf.

On 21 January 2018 Hula and his teammates Stoch, Kubacki, and Żyła, won the first ever medal, a bronze, for Poland in ski flying in team competition. It was also the first medal for Hula in senior competition. On 21 January 2018 coach Horngacher officially appointed Stefan Hula to 2018 Winter Olympics. On 27 January 2018 he was chosen to team competition in Zakopane. Hula with teammates won team competition in Poland for the first time. It was also a first podium in World Cup for Hula. Next day, in individual competition Hula was leading after 1 round and overall took 4th place, which is his best individual result in World Cup.

Hula made his best at the 2018 Winter Olympics. In normal hill event, he was leading after the first jump, but he ended up in 5th place. On 19 February 2018, Hula and his teammates Maciej Kot, Dawid Kubacki and Kamil Stoch achieved the first medal in an Olympic team competition for Poland. They claimed bronze behind Norway and Germany.

== Olympic Games ==
Place	Day	Year	Locality	Hill	Point K	HS	Competition	Jump 1	Jump 2	Note (points)	Loss (points)	Winner
29.	12 February	2006	Pragelato	Trampolino a Monte	K-95	HS-106	individual	95.5 m	90.5 m	218.0	48.5	Lars Bystøl
5.	20 February	2006	Pragelato	Trampolino a Monte	K-125	HS-140	team	118.0 m	119.0 m	894.4 (201.1)	89.6	Austria
31.	13 February	2010	Whistler	Whistler Olympic Park	K-95	HS-106	individual	95.0 m	—	112.5	164.0	Simon Ammann
19.	20 February	2010	Whistler	Whistler Olympic Park	K-125	HS-140	individual	122.5 m	124.0 m	217.2	66.4	Simon Ammann
6.	22 February	2010	Whistler	Whistler Olympic Park	K-125	HS-140	team	129.0 m	127.5 m	996.7 (240.7)	111.2	Austria
5.	10 February	2018	Pyeongchang	Alpensia	K-98	HS-109	individual	111.0 m	105.5 m	248.8	10.3	Andreas Wellinger
15.	17 February	2018	Pyeongchang	Alpensia	K-125	HS-140	individual	132.0 m	129.5 m	253.4	32.3	Kamil Stoch
3.	19 February	2018	Pyeongchang	Alpensia	K-125	HS-142	team	130.0 m	134.0 m	1072.4 (264.6)	26.1	Norway
26.	6 February	2022	Zhangjiakou	Snow Ruyi National Ski Jumping Centre	K-95	HS-106	individual	103.0 m	93.5 m	237.8		Ryōyū Kobayashi

== World Championships ==
Place	Day	Year	Locality	Hill	Point K	HS	Competition	Jump 1	Jump 2	Note (points)	Loss (points)	Winner
26.	21 February	2009	Liberec	Ještěd	K-90	HS-100	individual	94.5 m	89.5 m	234.5	47.5	Wolfgang Loitzl
4.	28 February	2009	Liberec	Ještěd	K-120	HS-134	team	127.0 m	125.0 m	972.1 (252.6)	62.2	Austria
4.	27 February	2011	Oslo	Midtstubakken	K-95	HS-106	team	97.5 m	93.0 m	953.0 (212.9)	72.5	Austria
33.	3 March	2011	Oslo	Holmenkollbakken	K-120	HS-134	individual	118.0 m	—	104.8	172.7	Gregor Schlierenzauer
5.	5 March	2011	Oslo	Holmenkollbakken	K-120	HS-134	team	113.5 m	—	435.6 (64.4)	64.4	Austria
4.	24 February	2019	Innsbruck	Bergisel	K-120	HS-130	team	113.5 m	116.5 m	909.1 (197.8)	78.4	Germany
12.	1 March	2019	Seefeld	Toni-Seelos-Olympiaschanze	K-99	HS-109	individual	88.0 m	100.0 m	205.8	12.5	Dawid Kubacki

== Ski Flying World Championships ==
Place	Day	Year	Locality	Hill	Point K	HS	Competition	Jump 1	Jump 2	Jump 3	Jump 4	Note (points)	Loss (points)	Winner
37.	13–14 January	2006	Tauplitz	Kulm	K-185	HS-203	individual	140.5 m	—	—	—	114.6	673.6	Roar Ljøkelsøy
9.	15 January	2006	Tauplitz	Kulm	K-185	HS-203	team	137.5 m		—		463.7 (158.1)	1044.2	Norway
10.	24 February	2008	Oberstdorf	Heini-Klopfer-Skiflugschanze	K-185	HS-213	team	120.0 m		—		573.8 (84.0)	979.5	Austria
4.	21 March	2010	Planica	Letalnica bratov Gorišek	K-185	HS-215	team	192.5 m		179.0 m		1452.5 (329.6)	188.9	Austria
21.	15–16 January	2016	Tauplitz	Kulm	K-200	HS-225	individual	202.5 m	167.5 m	193.0 m	—	450.4	189.7	Peter Prevc
5.	17 January	2016	Tauplitz	Kulm	K-200	HS-225	team	191.5 m		189.5 m		1211.9 (309.7)	255.8	Norway
13.	19–20 January	2018	Oberstdorf	Heini-Klopfer-Skiflugschanze	K-200	HS-235	individual	193.0 m	196.5 m	192.5 m	—	550.0	101.9	Daniel Andre Tande
3.	21 January	2018	Oberstdorf	Heini-Klopfer-Skiflugschanze	K-200	HS-235	team	206.0 m		210.0 m		1592.1 (392.9)	70.1	Norway

== World Cup ==
=== Season standings ===
Season	Overall	Ski-Flying	Four Hills Tournament	Raw Air	Willingen Five	Planica 7	Titisee-Neustadt Five
2005–06	54	–	52	–	–	–	—
2006–07	60	43	65	–	–	–	—
2007–08	72	–	–	–	–	–	—
2008–09	44	46	–	–	–	–	—
2009–10	63	42	35	–	–	–	—
2010–11	39	34	41	–	–	–	—
2011–12	–	–	62	–	–	–	—
2012–13	54	–	30	–	–	–	—
2013–14	79	–	–	–	–	–	—
2014–15	78	–	–	–	–	—	–
2015–16	26	36	25	–	—	–	–
2016–17	32	–	20	78	–	–	—
2017–18	13	15	12	13	7	10	—
2018–19	40	—	36	39	27	66	—
2019–20	46	—	35	—	—	—	41
2020–21							

=== Individual starts ===
Season	1	2	3	4	5	6	7	8	9	10	11	12	13	14	15	16	17	18	19	20	21	22	23	24	25	26	27	28	29	30	31	Points
2005/06	Kuusamo	Kuusamo	Lillehammer	Lillehammer	Harrachov	Harrachov	Engelberg	Oberstdorf	Garmisch-Partenkirchen	Innsbruck	Bischofshofen	Sapporo	Sapporo	Zakopane	Zakopane	Willingen	Lahti	Kuopio	Lillehammer	Oslo	Planica	Planica										19
2005/06	–	–	–	–	–	–	–	–	–	47	45	–	–	22	21	–	q	q	46	q	40	–										19
2006/07	Kuusamo	Lillehammer	Lillehammer	Engelberg	Engelberg	Oberstdorf	Garmisch-Partenkirchen	Innsbruck	Bischofshofen	Vikersund	Zakopane	Oberstdorf	Oberstdorf	Titisee-Neustadt	Titisee-Neustadt	Klingenthal	Willingen	Lahti	Kuopio	Oslo	Oslo	Planica	Planica	Planica								26
2006/07	12	29	48	q	q	–	q	q	50	29	50	42	46	49	q	–	–	q	40	41	46	–	–	–								26
2007/08	Kuusamo	Trondheim	Trondheim	Villach	Villach	Engelberg	Engelberg	Oberstdorf	Garmisch-Partenkirchen	Bischofshofen	Bischofshofen	Predazzo	Predazzo	Harrachov	Zakopane	Zakopane	Sapporo	Sapporo	Liberec	Liberec	Willingen	Kuopio	Kuopio	Lillehammer	Oslo	Planica	Planica					10
2007/08	–	–	–	–	–	–	–	–	–	–	–	–	–	29	24	35	29	30	39	32	51	–	–	–	–	–	–					10
2008/09	Kuusamo	Trondheim	Trondheim	Pragelato	Pragelato	Engelberg	Engelberg	Oberstdorf	Garmisch-Partenkirchen	Innsbruck	Bischofshofen	Tauplitz	Tauplitz	Zakopane	Zakopane	Whistler	Whistler	Sapporo	Willingen	Klingenthal	Oberstdorf	Lahti	Kuopio	Lillehammer	Vikersund	Planica	Planica					51
2008/09	–	–	–	–	–	–	–	–	–	–	–	–	–	18	39	34	32	10	38	50	–	39	26	38	24	–	–					51
2009/10	Kuusamo	Lillehammer	Lillehammer	Engelberg	Engelberg	Engelberg	Oberstdorf	Garmisch-Partenkirchen	Innsbruck	Bischofshofen	Bad Mitterndorf	Bad Mitterndorf	Sapporo	Sapporo	Zakopane	Zakopane	Oberstdorf	Klingenthal	Willingen	Lahti	Kuopio	Lillehammer	Oslo									20
2009/10	–	–	–	39	37	27	37	48	41	25	31	29	30	37	29	q	–	–	–	45	47	35	26									20
2010/11	Kuusamo	Kuopio	Lillehammer	Lillehammer	Engelberg	Engelberg	Engelberg	Oberstdorf	Garmisch-Partenkirchen	Innsbruck	Bischofshofen	Harrachov	Harrachov	Sapporo	Sapporo	Zakopane	Zakopane	Zakopane	Willingen	Klingenthal	Oberstdorf	Vikersund	Vikersund	Lahti	Planica	Planica						95
2010/11	38	44	29	47	q	36	7	35	45	43	34	21	18	–	–	24	40	13	q	29	q	–	–	q	30	27						95
2011/12	Kuusamo	Lillehammer	Lillehammer	Harrachov	Harrachov	Engelberg	Engelberg	Oberstdorf	Garmisch-Partenkirchen	Innsbruck	Bischofshofen	Bad Mitterndorf	Bad Mitterndorf	Zakopane	Zakopane	Sapporo	Sapporo	Predazzo	Predazzo	Willingen	Oberstdorf	Lahti	Trondheim	Oslo	Planica	Planica						0
2011/12	33	41	q	33	35	40	33	q	q	50	55	–	–	46	32	q	45	–	–	–	–	–	–	–	–	–						0
2012/13	Lillehammer	Lillehammer	Kuusamo	Krasnaja Polana	Krasnaja Polana	Engelberg	Engelberg	Oberstdorf	Garmisch-Partenkirchen	Innsbruck	Bischofshofen	Wisła	Zakopane	Sapporo	Sapporo	Vikersund	Vikersund	Harrachov	Harrachov	Klingenthal	Oberstdorf	Lahti	Kuopio	Trondheim	Oslo	Planica	Planica					28
2012/13	–	–	–	–	–	–	–	21	44	39	29	27	21	–	–	–	–	–	–	–	–	50	45	29	q	q	–					28
2013/14	Klingenthal	Kuusamo	Lillehammer	Lillehammer	Titisee-Neustadt	Titisee-Neustadt	Engelberg	Engelberg	Oberstdorf	Garmisch-Partenkirchen	Innsbruck	Bischofshofen	Tauplitz	Tauplitz	Wisła	Zakopane	Sapporo	Sapporo	Willingen	Willingen	Falun	Lahti	Lahti	Kuopio	Trondheim	Oslo	Planica	Planica				3
2013/14	–	q	47	–	–	–	–	–	–	–	–	–	–	–	44	42	36	28	38	46	–	–	–	–	–	–	–	–				3
2014/15	Klingenthal	Kuusamo	Kuusamo	Lillehammer	Lillehammer	Nizhny Tagil	Nizhny Tagil	Engelberg	Engelberg	Oberstdorf	Garmisch-Partenkirchen	Innsbruck	Bischofshofen	Tauplitz	Wisła	Zakopane	Sapporo	Sapporo	Willingen	Willingen	Titisee-Neustadt	Titisee-Neustadt	Vikersund	Vikersund	Lahti	Kuopio	Trondheim	Oslo	Oslo	Planica	Planica	4
2014/15	42	q	49	–	–	–	–	q	34	–	–	–	–	–	27	q	–	–	–	–	–	–	q	q	–	–	–	–	–	–	–	4
2015/16	Klingenthal	Lillehammer	Lillehammer	Nizhny Tagil	Nizhny Tagil	Engelberg	Engelberg	Oberstdorf	Garmisch-Partenkirchen	Innsbruck	Bischofshofen	Willingen	Zakopane	Sapporo	Sapporo	Trondheim	Vikersund	Vikersund	Vikersund	Lahti	Lahti	Kuopio	Almaty	Almaty	Wisła	Titisee-Neustadt	Planica	Planica	Planica			227
2015/16	–	22	10	23	q	22	32	42	24	27	24	18	21	16	14	38	26	36	q	14	30	6	–	–	16	20	33	26	25			227
2016/17	Kuusamo	Kuusamo	Klingenthal	Lillehammer	Lillehammer	Engelberg	Engelberg	Oberstdorf	Garmisch-Partenkirchen	Innsbruck	Bischofshofen	Wisła	Wisła	Zakopane	Willingen	Oberstdorf	Oberstdorf	Sapporo	Sapporo	Pyeongchang	Pyeongchang	Oslo	Trondheim	Vikersund	Planica	Planica						110
2016/17	27	31	18	18	19	16	36	18	16	42	24	20	q	24	32	36	34	42	33	47	46	q	–	–	–	–						110
2017/18	Wisła	Kuusamo	Nizhny Tagil	Nizhny Tagil	Titisee-Neustadt	Engelberg	Engelberg	Oberstdorf	Garmisch-Partenkirchen	Innsbruck	Bischofshofen	Tauplitz	Zakopane	Willingen	Willingen	Lahti	Oslo	Lillehammer	Trondheim	Vikersund	Planica	Planica										431
2017/18	7	21	27	40	13	22	13	5	27	11	14	14	4	6	12	17	42	9	11	17	21	13										431
2018/19	Wisła	Kuusamo	Kuusamo	Nizhny Tagil	Nizhny Tagil	Engelberg	Engelberg	Oberstdorf	Garmisch-Partenkirchen	Innsbruck	Bischofshofen	Predazzo	Predazzo	Zakopane	Sapporo	Sapporo	Oberstdorf	Oberstdorf	Oberstdorf	Lahti	Willingen	Willingen	Oslo	Lillehammer	Trondheim	Vikersund	Planica	Planica				69
2018/19	38	20	44	21	36	31	27	43	43	30	36	29	30	17	27	25	q	q	q	–	22	34	36	24	46	q	q					69
2019/20	Wisła HS134	Kuusamo HS142	Nizhny Tagil HS134	Nizhny Tagil HS134	Klingenthal HS140	Engelberg HS140	Engelberg HS140	Oberstdorf HS137	Garmisch-Partenkirchen HS142	Innsbruck HS130	Bischofshofen HS142	Predazzo HS104	Predazzo HS104	Titisee-Neustadt HS142	Titisee-Neustadt HS142	Zakopane HS140	Sapporo HS137	Sapporo HS137	Willingen HS145	Tauplitz HS235	Tauplitz HS235	Râșnov HS97	Râșnov HS97	Lahti HS130	Lahti HS130	Lillehammer HS140	Lillehammer HS140					31
2019/20	38	22	q	25	q	25	25	30	40	50	49	32	28	40	39	q	—	—	—	—	—	—	—	—	—	—	—					31
2020/21	Wisła HS134	Kuusamo HS142	Kuusamo HS142	Nizhny Tagil HS134	Nizhny Tagil HS134	Engelberg HS140	Engelberg HS140	Oberstdorf HS137	Garmisch-Partenkirchen HS142	Innsbruck HS130	Bischofshofen HS142	Titisee-Neustadt HS142	Titisee-Neustadt HS142	Zakopane HS140	Lahti HS130	Willingen HS145	Willingen HS145	TBD	TBD	TBD	TBD	Râșnov HS97	Oslo HS134	Lillehammer HS140	Trondheim HS138	Vikersund HS240	Planica HS240	Planica HS240				2
2020/21	29	–	–	41	35																											2

=== Team victories ===
	Day	Year	Location	Hill	Point K	HS	Jump 1	Jump 2	Note (points)
1.	27 January	2018	Zakopane	Wielka Krokiew	K-125	HS-140	136,0 m	135,5 m	1092.0 pkt (279.4)
