= Atle Pedersen Rønsen =

Norwegian ski jumper (born 1988)

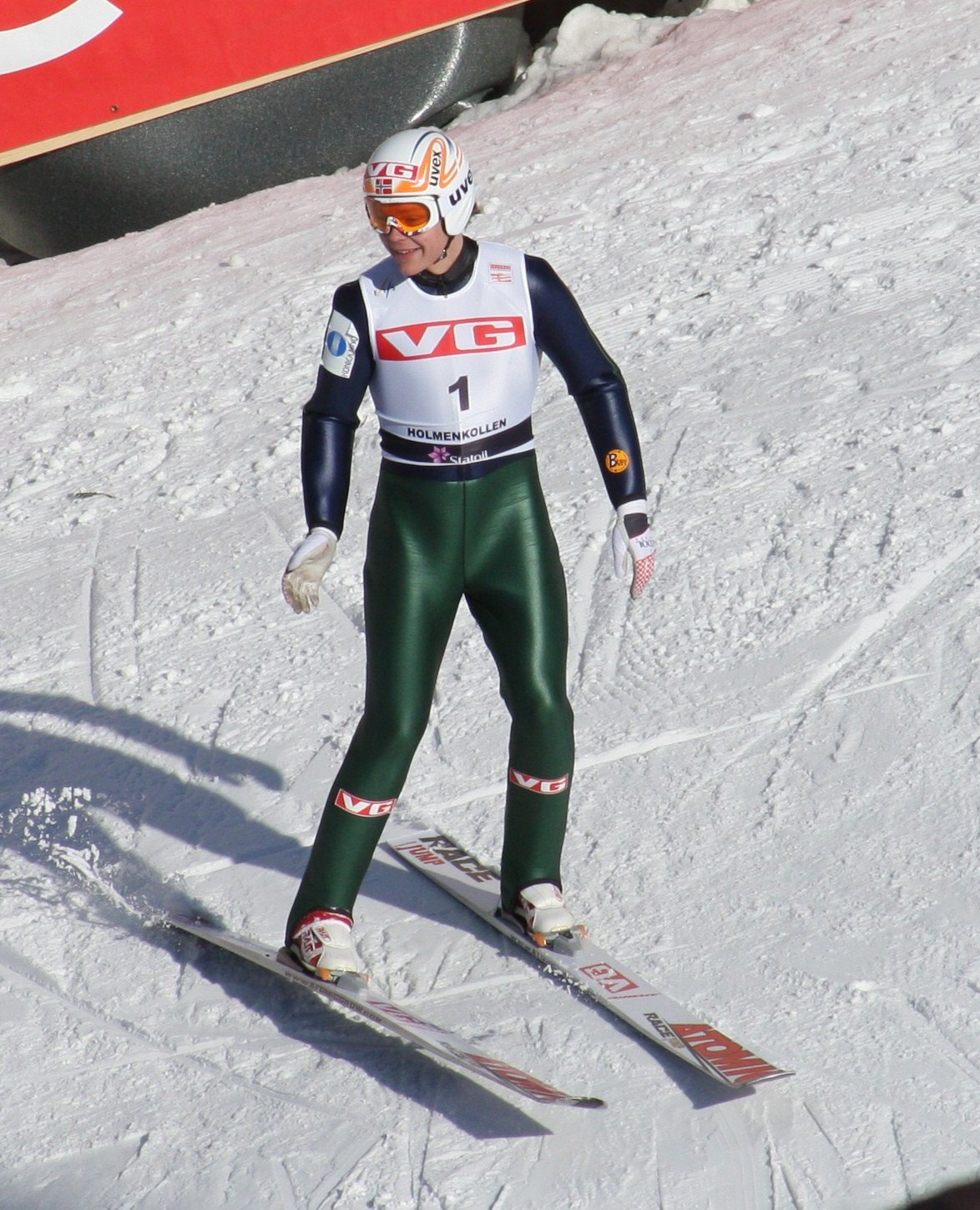
- Rønsen in Holmenkollen, 2010

Personal information
- Born: 13 August 1988 (age 37)

Sport
- Sport: Skiing
- Club: Eidsvold IF

World Cup career
- Seasons: 2010–2014
- Indiv. podiums: 0
- Indiv. wins: 0

Achievements and titles
- Personal bests: 188.5 m (618 ft); Kulm, 15 Jan 2012
- Updated on 22 Apr 2015

Atle Pedersen Rønsen (born 13 August 1988) is a Norwegian ski jumper. His best individual World Cup finish is 11th in Bischofshofen on 6 January 2012. His best successes have been in the Continental Cup, where he has won four times.
