= Ole Marius Ingvaldsen =

Norwegian ski jumper

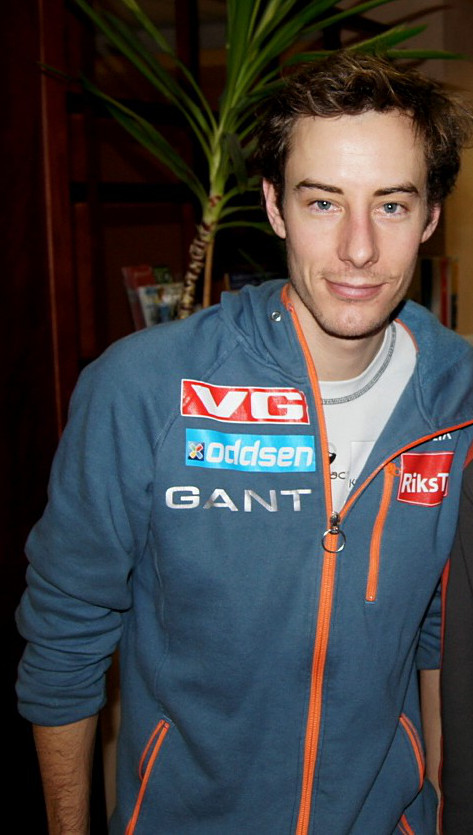

Personal information
- Full name: Ole Marius Besseberg Ingvaldsen
- Born: 2 October 1985 (age 40)

Sport
- Sport: Skiing
- Club: Steinkjer SK

World Cup career
- Seasons: 2010-present
- Indiv. podiums: 0
- Indiv. wins: 0
- Updated on 4 December 2010

Ole Marius Ingvaldsen (born 2 October 1985) is a Norwegian ski jumper.

In January 2008 he recorded his best placement in the Continental Cup, with a second place in Sapporo. He made his debut in the World Cup in December 2008 in Trondheim, where he finished 45th. He first finished among the top 30 in the World Cup with a 20th place from December 2010 in Lillehammer.

He hails from Steinkjer Municipality, and represents Steinkjer SK.
