= Ski jumping at the 2013 FIS Nordic Junior World Ski Championships =

Ski jumping competitions took place on 20–27 January 2013 in Liberec, Czech Republic, as the part of the 2013 FIS Nordic Junior World Ski Championships. This competition falls under the governing body of the International Ski Federation.

All three competitions – two individual (men and women) and one team (men) – took place on the normal hill, Ještěd. The women's competition took place for the eighth time, while men competed for the 33rd time.

The title team champion defended Norway (men) and Japan (women). The individual gold medalist, Nejc Dežman from Slovenia, couldn't participate in the Championship as he became a senior. The silver medalist took part in the Championships – Jaka Hvala and Aleksander Zniszczoł. Individuals of the individual women event was defended by Sara Takanashi from Japan.

It was the second time that the Junior World Ski Jumping Championships took place in Czech Republic. In 1993 the Junior Championships were in Harrachov.

76 men from 22 countries and 51 women from 12 countries competed in the Championships. In all, there were 127 jumpers representing 23 nations.

== Before the competition ==
=== Favorites ===
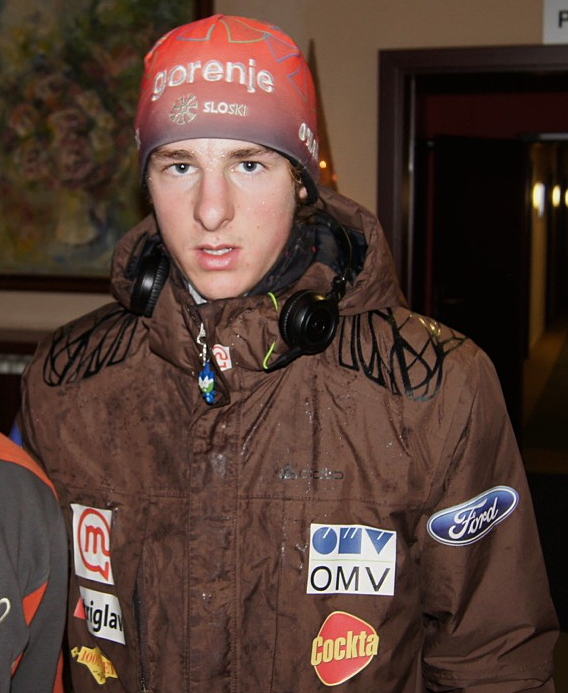
Jaka Hvala – one of the favourites in the individual men competition

Before the Championships, the favorites were Jaka Hvala (Slovenia), Andreas Wellinger (Germany), Karl Geiger (Germany), Stefan Kraft (Austria), and Aleksander Zniszczoł (Poland).

Among women, the favorites were Sarah Hendrickson (USA), Sara Takanashi (Japan), Coline Mattel (France) and Evelyn Insam (Italy).

In the team competition, the favorites were Slovenia and Poland (men) and again Slovenia, Japan and Germany (women).

== The competitions ==
On 24 January, the individual competitions (men and women) took place. In the women's competition, Sara Takanashi(Japan) won first place. The silver medal by Evelyn Insam, and the bronze one – Katja Požun. In the men's competition, the winner was Jaka Hvala, who had almost 20 points more that the second Klemens Murańka. In third place was Stefan Kraft.

On 26 January, the team competitions took place. In the women's competition the winner was Slovenia. The silver medal was France, and the bronze one - Germany. In the men competition the winner was Slovenia, too. The second place for Poland, and the third – Germany.

== Ski jumping hills ==
All four competitions took place on the normal hill (Ještěd, HS 100) in Liberec.

Ski jumping hill	Place	Construction point	Hill size	Official record		
Ještěd	Liberec	K90	HS100	114 m	Mats Søhagen Berggaard	15 February 2011

== Jury ==
The Chief of Competition was Horst Tielmann. The FIS Technical Delegate was Ryszard Guńka, and his assistant – Thomas Hasslberger.

== The results ==
=== Men competition ===
==== Individual competition (24.01.2013) ====
Rank	Jumper	Country	Jump 1		Jump 2		Total
Rank	Jumper	Country	Distance	Points	Distance	Points	Total
1	Jaka Hvala	Slovenia	103,0	142,5	102,0	141,0	283,5
2	Klemens Murańka	Poland	101,0	137,0	96,0	127,0	264,0
3	Stefan Kraft	Austria	99,0	132,5	95,5	126,0	258,5
4	Bartłomiej Kłusek	Poland	99,0	131,5	96,5	126,5	258,0
5	Andreas Wellinger	Germany	100,0	132,5	95,0	123,5	256,0
6	Reruhi Shimizu	Japan	95,5	124,0	96,0	125,0	249,0
7	Karl Geiger	Germany	96,5	125,0	94,5	121,5	246,5
8	Mats Søhagen Berggaard	Norway	94,5	123,0	95,0	123,0	246,0
9	Aleksander Zniszczoł	Poland	95,5	122,5	95,5	123,0	245,5
10	Ronan Lamy Chappuis	France	93,5	119,5	96,0	125,0	244,5
11	Cene Prevc	Slovenia	94,0	122,0	93,0	119,0	241,0
12	Thomas Lackner	Austria	94,0	120,5	93,0	119,0	239,5
13	Yukiya Satō	Japan	91,0	113,0	96,0	125,0	238,0
14	Anže Semenič	Slovenia	93,5	118,0	93,5	118,5	236,5
15	Killian Peier	Switzerland	98,0	126,0	90,0	110,0	236,0
16	Juho Ojala	Finland	92,0	115,5	93,5	119,5	235,0
16	Vojtěch Štursa	Czech Republic	94,5	123,0	90,0	112,0	235,0
18	Jonas Gropen Søgård	Norway	95,5	124,0	89,5	110,5	234,5
19	Remus Tudor	Romania	93,0	115,5	93,0	117,0	232,5
19	Philipp Aschenwald	Austria	91,5	114,0	93,0	118,5	232,5
21	Ruben de Wit	Netherlands	93,0	117,0	92,0	115,0	232,0
22	Wladislaw Bojarincew	Russia	92,0	114,5	92,0	116,0	230,5
23	Shingo Nishikata	Japan	91,5	114,5	91,5	115,0	229,5
24	Pascal Kälin	Switzerland	90,5	113,5	91,0	113,0	226,5
25	Brian Wallace	USA	92,0	117,0	88,5	109,0	226,0
26	Tomáš Friedrich	Czech Republic	92,0	115,5	88,5	107,5	223,0
27	Jarkko Määttä	Finland	92,0	116,5	87,0	105,0	221,5
28	Michaił Maksimoczkin	Russia	91,5	114,5	86,0	101,0	215,5
29	Martti Nõmme	Estland	93,0	114,5	85,5	100,5	215,0
30	Benjamin Raffort	France	91,5	113,5	83,5	96,5	210,0
31	Florian Altenburger	Austria	90,5	112,5	nq		112,5
32	Daniel-André Tande	Norway	90,0	112,0	nq		112,0
32	Oldrik van der Aalst	Netherlands	92,5	112,0	nq		112,0
34	Antti Aalto	Finland	90,5	109,0	nq		109,0
35	Jan Souček	Czech Republic	88,5	108,5	nq		108,5
35	Matic Benedik	Slovenia	89,5	108,5	nq		108,5
37	Tomoya Watanabe	Japan	88,0	107,0	nq		107,0
38	Johann André Forfang	Norway	86,5	104,5	nq		104,5
39	Grzegorz Miętus	Poland	86,5	104,0	nq		104,0
40	Christian Heim	Germany	87,0	103,5	nq		103,5
40	Miika Ylipulli	Finland	86,5	103,5	nq		103,5
42	Michael Dreher	Germany	85,5	102,5	nq		102,5
43	Wołodymyr Werediuk	Ukraine	86,0	101,5	nq		101,5
44	Siim-Tanel Sammelselg	Estland	86,0	101,0	nq		101,0
45	Federico Cecon	Italy	85,5	100,5	nq		100,5
45	Sorin Iulian Pîtea	Romania	85,5	100,5	nq		100,5
47	Dejan Funtarow	Bulgaria	84,5	96,5	nq		96,5
48	Julien Faivre Rampant	France	81,5	92,5	nq		92,5
49	William Rhoads	USA	81,0	90,5	nq		90,5
50	Sacha Gardet	France	81,0	90,0	nq		90,0
51	Park Je-un	South Korea	80,5	89,5	nq		89,5
52	Alex Insam	Italy	79,5	87,5	nq		87,5
53	Sabyrżan Muminow	Kazakhstan	78,5	83,5	nq		83,5
54	Nicholas Mattoon	USA	77,0	82,0	nq		82,0
55	Filip Sakala	Czech Republic	79,0	81,0	nq		81,0
56	Maksim Migaczow	Russia	75,0	76,5	nq		76,5
57	Ákos Szilágyi	Hungary	71,0	68,0	nq		68,0
58	Daniel Simow	Bulgaria	66,5	54,0	nq		54,0
59	Christian Friberg	USA	61,0	46,5	nq		46,5
60	Andrij Kłymczuk	Ukraine	62,5	43,5	nq		43,5
61	Pawieł Kołmakow	Kazakhstan	56,5	33,5	nq		33,5
62	Kristaps Nežborts	Latvia	52,0	27,5	nq		27,5
–	Zeno di Lenardo	Italy	83,5	DSQ			
–	Siergiej Szułajew	Russia	81,0	DSQ			
–	Si Jeong-heon	South Korea	51,0	DSQ			

==== Team competition (26.01.2013) ====
Rank	Team	Jumpers	Jump 1		Jump 2		Points	Total
Rank	Team	Jumpers	Distance	Points	Distance	Points	Points	Total
1.	Slovenia	Anže Semenič	97,5	129,5	98,5	130,5	260,0	1086,5
1.	Slovenia	Ernest Prišlič	95,5	123,5	100,5	133,0	256,5	1086,5
1.	Slovenia	Cene Prevc	101,5	140,0	102,5	141,0	281,0	1086,5
1.	Slovenia	Jaka Hvala	101,0	137,5	107,0	151,5	289,0	1086,5
2.	Poland	Bartłomiej Kłusek	94,0	121,5	98,5	131,5	253,0	1062,0
2.	Poland	Krzysztof Biegun	98,0	130,0	96,5	127,5	257,5	1062,0
2.	Poland	Aleksander Zniszczoł	102,0	139,5	101,0	137,0	276,5	1062,0
2.	Poland	Klemens Murańka	97,0	129,0	105,0	146,0	275,0	1062,0
3.	Germany	Karl Geiger	96,5	126,0	101,0	136,5	262,5	1038,5
3.	Germany	Michael Dreher	95,0	125,0	95,5	125,0	250,0	1038,5
3.	Germany	Tobias Löffler	96,5	126,0	97,0	126,5	252,5	1038,5
3.	Germany	Andreas Wellinger	98,5	131,5	103,0	142,0	273,5	1038,5
4.	Austria	Thomas Lackner	93,5	119,5	97,5	129,5	249,0	1034,0
4.	Austria	Florian Altenburger	89,0	109,0	96,0	125,0	234,0	1034,0
4.	Austria	Philipp Aschenwald	101,5	139,0	102,0	139,5	278,5	1034,0
4.	Austria	Stefan Kraft	100,0	135,5	101,0	137,0	272,5	1034,0
5.	Norway	Daniel-André Tande	95,5	125,0	100,0	134,5	259,5	967,0
5.	Norway	Jonas Gropen Søgård	91,5	114,0	87,5	106,5	220,5	967,0
5.	Norway	Sigurd Nymoen Søberg	94,0	118,5	97,5	128,0	246,5	967,0
5.	Norway	Mats Søhagen Berggaard	91,0	116,0	95,0	124,5	240,5	967,0
6.	Japan	Shingo Nishikata	89,5	111,0	92,5	117,0	228,0	965,0
6.	Japan	Yukiya Satō	91,5	114,0	101,5	136,5	250,5	965,0
6.	Japan	Tomoya Watanabe	87,0	105,0	85,0	100,5	205,5	965,0
6.	Japan	Reruhi Shimizu	99,0	132,5	106,0	148,5	281,0	965,0
7.	Russia	Jewgienij Klimow	95,5	125,0	93,5	120,5	245,5	929,5
7.	Russia	Siergiej Szułajew	85,5	98,0	82,0	93,5	191,5	929,5
7.	Russia	Michaił Maksimoczkin	97,5	130,5	91,5	115,5	246,0	929,5
7.	Russia	Władisław Bojarincew	95,5	123,5	95,0	123,0	246,5	929,5
8.	Finland	Antti Aalto	91,0	111,0	93,0	115,0	226,0	919,0
8.	Finland	Miika Ylipulli	85,0	100,0	88,0	107,5	207,5	919,0
8.	Finland	Jarkko Määttä	94,0	122,0	92,5	118,5	240,5	919,0
8.	Finland	Juho Ojala	92,0	117,0	96,5	128,0	245,0	919,0
9.	Czech Republic	Tomáš Friedrich	82,5	94,5	nq		94,5	409,0
9.	Czech Republic	Jan Souček	87,0	104,0	nq		104,0	409,0
9.	Czech Republic	David Bartoš	90,0	111,0	nq		111,0	409,0
9.	Czech Republic	Vojtěch Štursa	93,0	119,5	nq		119,5	409,0
10.	France	Julien Faivre Rampant	82,5	94,5	nq		94,5	425,0
10.	France	Benjamin Raffort	85,0	100,0	nq		100,0	425,0
10.	France	Sacha Gardet	88,5	106,5	nq		106,5	425,0
10.	France	Ronan Lamy Chappuis	95,0	124,0	nq		124,0	425,0
11.	Switzerland	Pascal Kälin	91,5	115,5	nq		115,5	416,0
11.	Switzerland	Luca Egloff	80,5	83,0	nq		83,0	416,0
11.	Switzerland	Andreas Schuler	83,0	92,0	nq		92,0	416,0
11.	Switzerland	Killian Peier	97,0	125,5	nq		125,5	416,0
12.	Italy	Alex Insam	76,5	80,5	nq		80,5	393,0
12.	Italy	Zeno di Lenardo	85,0	99,5	nq		99,5	393,0
12.	Italy	Daniele Varesco	89,0	109,5	nq		109,5	393,0
12.	Italy	Federico Cecon	87,0	103,5	nq		103,5	393,0
13.	United States	Christian Friberg	76,5	81,0	nq		81,0	366,5
13.	United States	William Rhoads	77,5	82,0	nq		82,0	366,5
13.	United States	Nicholas Mattoon	86,0	101,5	nq		101,5	366,5
13.	United States	Brian Wallace	86,5	102,0	nq		102,0	366,5

=== Women ===
==== Individual competition (24.01.2013) ====
Rank	Jumper	Country	Jump 1		Jump 2		Total
Rank	Jumper	Country	Distance	Points	Distance	Points	Total
1	Sara Takanashi	Japan	98,5	132,0	102,0	136,0	268,0
2	Evelyn Insam	Italy	96,5	128,0	100,0	131,5	259,5
3	Katja Požun	Slovenia	94,5	122,0	99,0	131,5	253,5
4	Coline Mattel	France	95,0	123,5	95,0	123,0	246,5
5	Urša Bogataj	Slovenia	93,0	117,5	96,0	124,0	241,5
6	Sarah Hendrickson	USA	9,0	111,5	97,0	129,5	241,0
7	Špela Rogelj	Slovenia	89,0	108,0	96,0	125,5	233,5
8	Michaela Doleželová	Czech Republic	90,0	110,5	93,5	119,5	230,0
9	Ema Klinec	Slovenia	89,5	111,0	91,5	116,0	227,0
10	Léa Lemare	France	89,0	110,0	92,0	116,0	226,0
11	Katharina Althaus	Germany	86,0	103,5	92,0	117,0	220,5
12	Yūki Itō	Japonan	87,0	106,5	90,0	113,5	220,0
13	Chiara Hölzl	Austria	89,5	106,0	88,0	105,5	211,5
14	Pauline Heßler	Germany	88,0	108,0	85,0	98,5	206,5
15	Sofja Tichonowa	Russia	86,0	102,5	86,5	103,0	205,5
16	Gyda Enger	Norway	80,0	87,0	91,0	114,0	201,0
17	Ramona Straub	Germany	86,5	103,0	83,0	95,5	198,5
18	Svenja Würth	Germany	80,0	87,0	90,5	108,0	195,0
19	Julia Clair	France	82,0	92,5	85,0	100,0	192,5
20	Maren Lundby	Norway	80,0	89,0	85,0	101,5	190,5
21	Aleksandra Kustowa	Russia	83,0	93,5	82,0	91,5	185,0
22	Daniela Haralambie	Romania	79,5	87,5	82,5	95,0	182,5
23	Sonja Schoitsch	Austria	78,5	82,5	83,5	95,5	179,0
24	Yuka Kobayashi	Japan	78,0	81,0	80,5	89,0	170,0
25	Liu Qi	China	79,0	80,0	82,5	89,0	169,0
26	Veronica Gianmoena	Italy	76,0	76,5	82,0	90,0	166,5
27	Katharina Keil	Austria	73,0	73,5	79,5	87,0	160,5
28	Jenny Synnøve Hagemoen	Norway	78,0	84,5	73,0	72,5	157,0
29	Emilee Anderson	USA	74,5	73,5	76,0	76,0	149,5
30	Nina Lussi	USA	72,0	71,0	75,5	78,0	149,0
31	Darja Gruszyna	Russia	71,0	66,0	nq		66,0
31	Michaela Rajnochová	Czech Republic	70,0	66,0	nq		66,0
33	Océane Avocat Gros	France	70,0	65,5	nq		65,5
33	Jun Maruyama	Japan	69,5	65,5	nq		65,5
35	Manuela Malsiner	Italy	70,5	62,0	nq		62,0
36	Barbora Blažková	Czech Republic	67,5	61,0	nq		61,0
37	Zdena Pešatová	Czech Republic	68,0	60,5	nq		60,5
38	Anna Odine Strøm	Norway	67,5	58,0	nq		58,0
39	Li Xueyao	China	67,0	57,5	nq		57,5
40	Ji Cheng	China	62,5	48,0	nq		48,0
41	Chang Xinyue	China	54,5	26,5	nq		26,5
42	Manon Maurer	USA	47,0	17,0	nq		17,0
–	Stiefanija Nadymowa	Russia	57,5	DSQ			

==== Team competition (26.01.2013) ====
Rank	Team	Jumpers	Jump 1		Jump 2		Points	Total
Rank	Team	Jumpers	Distance	Points	Distance	Points	Points	Total
1.	Slovenia	Urša Bogataj	97,5	128,0	95,5	123,0	251,0	1009,0
1.	Slovenia	Ema Klinec	92,0	116,5	91,5	116,5	233,0	1009,0
1.	Slovenia	Špela Rogelj	100,0	127,5	103,0	142,0	269,5	1009,0
1.	Slovenia	Katja Požun	94,5	122,0	99,5	133,5	255,5	1009,0
2.	France	Léa Lemare	88,0	108,0	96,5	124,5	232,5	787,0
2.	France	Océane Avocat Gros	66,0	57,5	66,5	58,5	116,0	787,0
2.	France	Julia Clair	81,5	92,5	92,5	116,5	209,0	787,0
2.	France	Coline Mattel	91,5	115,5	91,0	114,0	229,5	787,0
3.	Germany	Ramona Straub	86,5	104,0	88,5	107,5	211,5	762,0
3.	Germany	Pauline Heßler	DSQ		83,5	98,0	98,0	762,0
3.	Germany	Svenja Würth	90,0	110,0	93,5	116,5	226,5	762,0
3.	Germany	Katharina Althaus	91,0	114,5	89,5	111,5	226,0	762,0
4.	Norway	Gyda Enger	89,5	109,5	93,5	119,5	229,0	759,5
4.	Norway	Anna Odine Strøm	72,0	66,5	70,0	63,0	129,5	759,5
4.	Norway	Jenny Synnøve Hagemoen	76,0	80,5	90,0	113,5	194,0	759,5
4.	Norway	Maren Lundby	86,5	104,0	86,0	103,0	207,0	759,5
5.	Japan	Yuka Kobayashi	DSQ		74,5	77,0	77,0	726,5
5.	Japan	Mizuki Yamaguchi	65,0	51,0	82,5	94,5	145,5	726,5
5.	Japan	Yūki Itō	91,0	115,5	95,0	124,0	239,5	726,5
5.	Japan	Sara Takanashi	101,5	136,5	97,5	128,0	264,5	726,5
6.	Russia	Stiefanija Nadymowa	71,5	67,5	72,0	69,5	137,0	650,0
6.	Russia	Aleksandra Kustowa	84,5	99,0	90,0	108,0	207,0	650,0
6.	Russia	Darja Gruszyna	75,5	78,0	61,0	43,5	121,5	650,0
6.	Russia	Sofja Tichonowa	83,0	94,5	80,5	90,0	184,5	650,0
7.	Czech Republic	Michaela Rajnochová	70,5	66,0	69,5	65,5	131,5	647,5
7.	Czech Republic	Zdena Pešatová	77,5	80,5	78,0	80,5	161,0	647,5
7.	Czech Republic	Barbora Blažková	71,0	67,5	71,0	68,5	136,0	647,5
7.	Czech Republic	Michaela Doleželová	86,0	101,0	92,5	118,0	219,0	647,5
8.	United States	Manon Maurer	50,0	24,5	47,0	17,5	42,0	617,0
8.	United States	Nina Lussi	72,5	72,0	73,5	69,0	141,0	617,0
8.	United States	Emilee Anderson	77,5	80,5	78,0	83,5	164,0	617,0
8.	United States	Sarah Hendrickson	96,5	126,5	106,0	143,5	270,0	617,0
