= Poland at the 2012–13 FIS Ski Jumping World Cup =

The Polish national ski jumping team in the 2012–13 FIS Ski Jumping World Cup season achieved a record-breaking total of 3,447 points. This surpassed all previous seasons. The team secured 5th place in the Nations Cup. 10 athletes contributed to the points tally, a record at the time.

The season began with poor results, prompting the coach to consider resignation. However, the team rebounded, achieving seven podium finishes in individual competitions, including three victories by Kamil Stoch and Piotr Żyła. Stoch was the highest-ranked Polish athlete, finishing 3rd in the overall World Cup standings. The team also secured two podium finishes in team events.

== Background ==
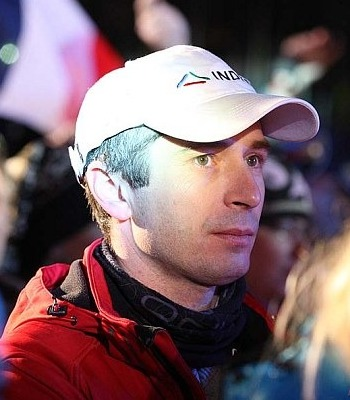
Łukasz Kruczek, head coach of the A-team since the 2008–09 season

The previous World Cup season (2011–12) was the first without the team's former leader, Adam Małysz, who retired. Poland finished 6th in the Nations Cup, with Kamil Stoch as the top individual performer, placing 5th overall and earning seven podium finishes in individual World Cup events.

In the 2012 Summer Grand Prix, Maciej Kot was the top Polish performer, finishing 5th overall, while Dawid Kubacki placed 8th.

The first group of the A-team, coached by Łukasz Kruczek, included Kamil Stoch, Piotr Żyła, Maciej Kot, and Krzysztof Miętus.

== Season overview ==
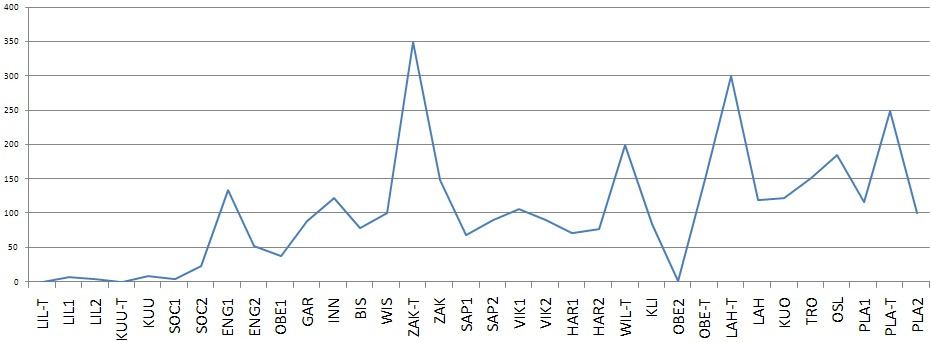
Points scored by Poland in individual World Cup competitions

=== Early struggles ===
==== Individual competitions in Lillehammer ====
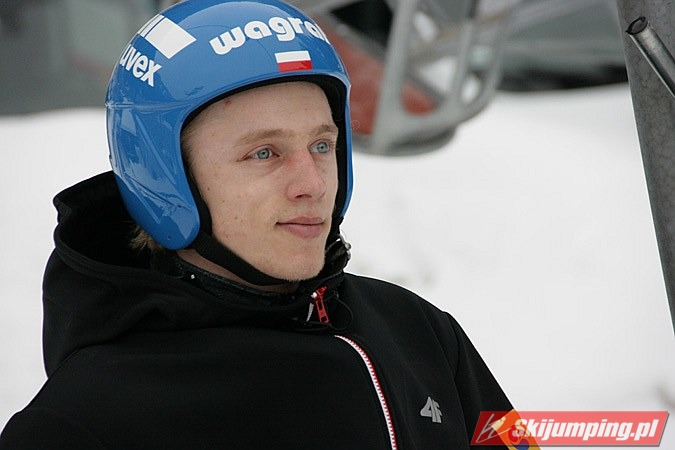
Dawid Kubacki, the top Polish point scorer until the Sochi competitions

The Polish team began the 2012–13 World Cup season with an individual competition on the normal hill in Lillehammer on 24 November. In the qualifications held the previous day, Krzysztof Miętus (5th), Dawid Kubacki, Piotr Żyła, and Maciej Kot placed in the top 40. Kamil Stoch was prequalified, while Bartłomiej Kłusek finished 45th.

In the main competition, Dawid Kubacki jumped 91.5 meters, placing 34th. Krzysztof Miętus (89 meters) and Piotr Żyła (90.5 meters) finished 44th and 36th, respectively, failing to advance to the final round. Maciej Kot's 93-meter jump secured 23rd place, qualifying him for the second round. Kamil Stoch, with a 91.5-meter jump, took 30th place in the first round, narrowly beating Tom Hilde by 0.2 points. In the second round, Stoch's 87.5-meter jump, the second shortest of the round, resulted in a final 30th place with 220 points. Kot, jumping 92 meters, dropped to 25th with 231.1 points. The Polish performance was described as weak.

Coach Łukasz Kruczek noted that the athletes "tried to jump better than usual", leading to forced efforts. Kot acknowledged the need to improve his takeoff technique.

In the large hill competition, all Polish athletes qualified, but only Krzysztof Miętus scored points. His 128.5-meter jump placed him 29th after the first round. A second-round jump of 125.5 meters moved him to 26th. Other Poles finished outside the top 30: Stoch (36th, 128.5 meters), Żyła (43rd, 122.5 meters), Kubacki (45th, 122.5 meters), Kłusek (46th, 121 meters), and Kot (48th, 120 meters).

After Lillehammer's two individual competitions and one mixed team event (in which Poland did not participate), the team ranked 10th in the Nations Cup with 12 points. Individually, Maciej Kot was the highest-ranked Pole at 32nd with 6 points, followed by Miętus (34th, 5 points) and Stoch (40th, 1 point). Media described the team's performance as "very poor".

==== Team and individual competitions in Rukatunturi ====
For the qualifications in Rukatunturi on 29 November, the same athletes were entered, except Kłusek. Kamil Stoch failed to qualify, finishing 50th with a 106.5-meter jump. Stoch competed in the team event the next day, jumping 104.5 meters in the first group. Piotr Żyła (110 meters) and Dawid Kubacki (123.5 meters) followed, briefly moving Poland to second-to-last place after the third group. However, Maciej Kot's 103.5-meter jump dropped the team to last (11th) with 354.3 points, 749.8 points behind winners Germany.

In the individual competition on 1 December, only Kubacki reached the second round, placing 22nd after a 127.5-meter first-round jump, earning his first World Cup points. Kot finished 32nd (115.5 meters), Miętus 47th (102.5 meters), and Żyła 48th (94.5 meters). Kubacki's 116-meter second-round jump maintained his 22nd place, adding 9 points.

Stoch and Żyła then trained in Ramsau am Dachstein, Austria, with Kruczek, while Kubacki, Kot, Kłusek, and Miętus, coached by Zbigniew Klimowski, competed in Sochi.

==== Individual competitions in Sochi ====
In the first Sochi competition on 8 December, Kubacki placed 15th after a 98.5-meter first-round jump, and Kot was 27th (97 meters). Miętus finished 43rd (94 meters), and Kłusek 47th (93.5 meters). In the second round, Kubacki's 93.5-meter jump dropped him to 30th, while Kot's 96.5-meter jump placed him 28th. Poland fell to 13th in the Nations Cup, overtaken by Bulgaria.

In the second Sochi event, Kubacki was 16th (97.5 meters) and Kot 23rd (97 meters) after the first round. Kubacki's second 97.5-meter jump dropped him to 17th, while Kot's 96.5-meter jump moved him to 22nd. Kłusek placed 40th (95 meters), and Miętus failed to qualify. Kubacki was the top Pole in the overall standings (36th), with Poland last in the Nations Cup.

Kruczek later admitted considering resignation due to the early season struggles, but the athletes opposed it.

==== Individual competitions in Engelberg ====
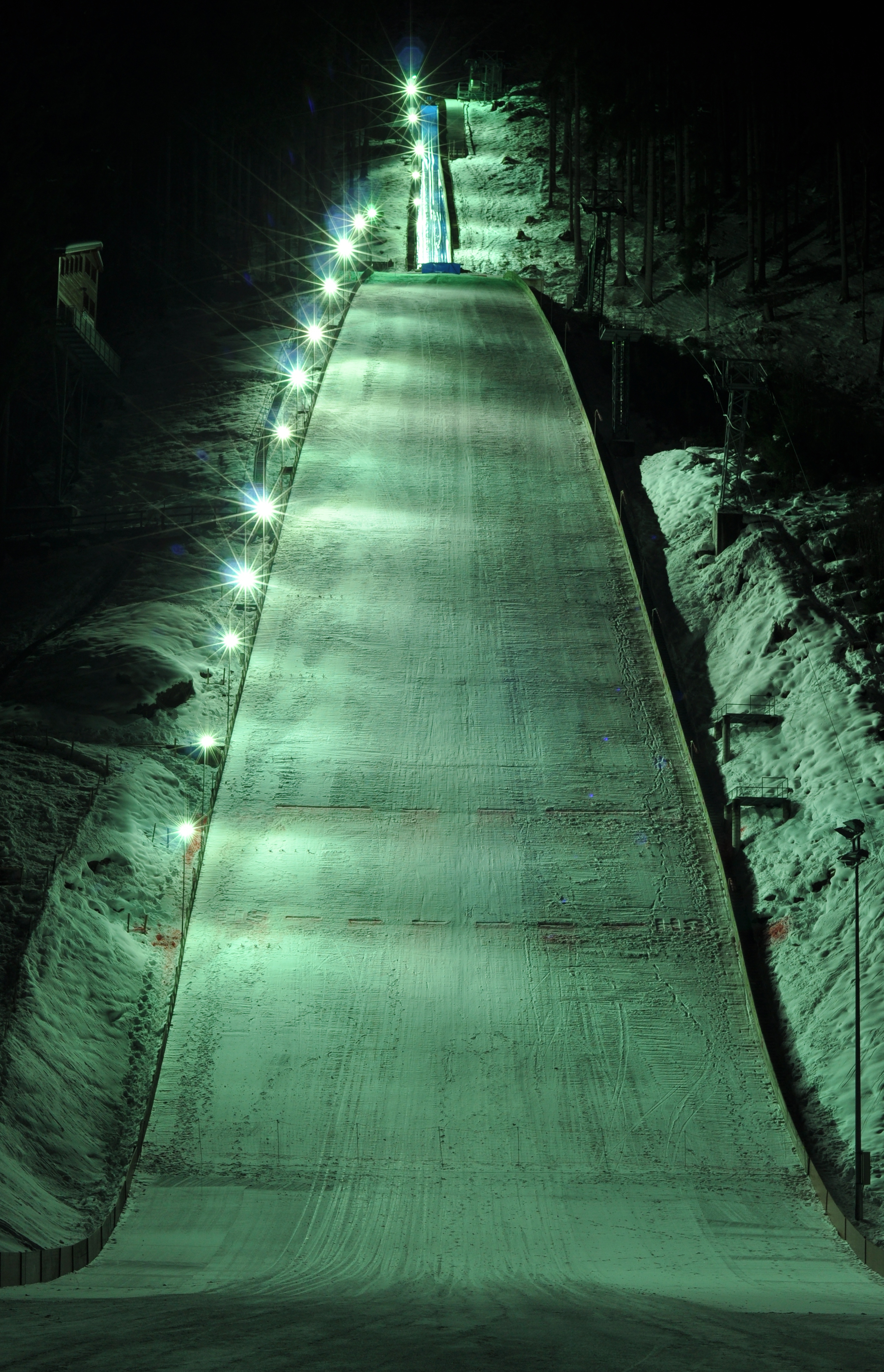
Gross-Titlis-Schanze, site of Kamil Stoch's "great comeback"

Stoch and Żyła rejoined the team for the Engelberg competitions, held before the Four Hills Tournament. In the first event on 15 December, only Żyła failed to score points, placing 36th (122 meters). Stoch led after a 132.5-meter first-round jump, 0.8 points ahead of Schlierenzauer. Kubacki was 5th (132 meters), Miętus 19th (128.5 meters), Kot 23rd (126 meters), and Murańka 29th (127 meters). In the second round, Stoch's 134-meter jump earned 2nd place, 0.1 points behind winner Andreas Kofler. Kubacki finished 9th (128.5 meters), Kot 17th (129 meters), Miętus 23rd (124 meters), and Murańka 28th (127 meters).

In the second Engelberg event, three Poles scored points. Stoch was 7th (131 meters) and Kot 8th (131.5 meters) after the first round. Kubacki was 15th (128 meters), and Miętus tied for 30th (126 meters). Żyła (37th, 120.5 meters) and Murańka (40th, 119 meters) missed the second round. In the final round, Kot dropped to 13th (123.5 meters), Stoch to 14th (123.5 meters), Kubacki to 17th (130 meters), and Miętus to 31st (122.5 meters).

After Engelberg, Kubacki climbed from 32nd to 26th, Kot from 34th to 30th, Miętus from 44th to 39th, and Stoch from 49th to 18th in the overall standings. Murańka, with three points, was 48th. Poland moved from 12th to seventh in the Nations Cup.

=== Four Hills Tournament ===
Poland had a quota of seven athletes for the 2012–13 Four Hills Tournament. Stefan Hula, Piotr Żyła, Klemens Murańka, Krzysztof Miętus, Maciej Kot, Dawid Kubacki, and Kamil Stoch competed in Oberstdorf. Qualification results determined the following knockout (KO) system pairings:

- Maciej Kot vs. Maximilian Mechler
- Sebastian Colloredo vs. Stefan Hula
- Klemens Murańka vs. Michael Hayböck
- Jaka Hvala vs. Kamil Stoch
- Martin Koch vs. Dawid Kubacki
- Gregor Deschwanden vs. Piotr Żyła
- Krzysztof Miętus vs. Severin Freund

Stoch won the practice round. In the competition, Stoch's 132.5-meter jump won his KO pair, placing 5th after the KO round, 9 points behind the leader. Hvala, his opponent, jumped 127 meters and qualified as a lucky loser. Murańka's 129.5-meter jump beat Hayböck (124.5 meters), placing 20th. Kubacki's 127-meter jump defeated Koch (118.5 meters), earning 25th. Hula's 128.5-meter jump beat Colloredo (126.5 meters), placing 27th. Żyła (125 meters, 31st), Miętus (129 meters, 33rd), and Kot (111.5 meters, 50th) lost their KO pairs. In the final round, Hula climbed to 21st (126 meters), Kubacki dropped to 26th (124.5 meters), Murańka to 28th (118.5 meters), and Stoch to 13th (125 meters), 44.3 points behind winner Jacobsen.

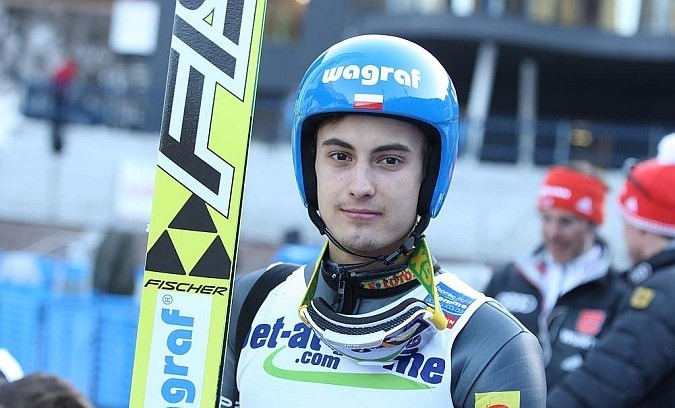
Maciej Kot, who placed in the top 10 in three Four Hills Tournament events

All Poles except Murańka, disqualified for an irregular suit, qualified for Garmisch-Partenkirchen. KO pairings were:

- Michael Hayböck vs. Maciej Kot
- Krzysztof Miętus vs. Dawid Kubacki
- Stefan Hula vs. Lauri Asikainen
- Piotr Żyła vs. Martin Koch
- Simon Ammann vs. Kamil Stoch

Stoch's 142-meter jump tied for 2nd with Tom Hilde, 2.8 points behind Schlierenzauer. Kot's 134.5-meter jump placed 6th, beating Hayböck by 13.3 points. Żyła (128 meters) and Kubacki (126.5 meters) were 28th and 29th, respectively. Miętus (38th, 126 meters) and Hula (44th, 124.5 meters) missed the final round. In the second round, Żyła's 122-meter jump earned 30th place and his first point of the season. Kubacki climbed to 28th (126.5 meters), Kot to 5th (135 meters), and Stoch to 6th (131.5 meters), tying with Dmitriy Vassiliev. Stoch rose to 7th in the tournament standings, 60.2 points behind the leader, with Kubacki 19th, Kot 33rd, Hula 30th, Żyła 34th, Murańka 38th, and Miętus 40th.

Murańka was sent to Poland for Continental Cup events before Innsbruck. All remaining Poles qualified, with Stoch and Kot tying for 1st (excluding prequalified athletes) and Miętus 3rd in qualifications. KO pairings were:

- Dawid Kubacki vs. Severin Freund
- Piotr Żyła vs. Taku Takeuchi
- Stefan Hula vs. Richard Freitag
- Yuta Watase vs. Krzysztof Miętus
- Anders Johnson vs. Maciej Kot
- Anton Kalinitschenko vs. Kamil Stoch

Stoch's 124.5-meter jump placed 4th, beating Kalinitschenko by 30.7 points. Kot's 121.5-meter jump earned 8th, 25.5 points ahead of Johnson. Miętus (117.5 meters) was 28th, 9.7 points better than Watase. Żyła (125 meters) qualified as a lucky loser, placing 20th but losing to Takeuchi by 0.1 points. Kubacki (36th, 117.5 meters) and Hula (39th, 118.5 meters) lost their KO pairs. In the final round, Miętus climbed to 27th (118 meters), Żyła dropped to 22nd (117.5 meters), Kot to 9th (119 meters), and Stoch to 2nd (123 meters), 12.8 points behind Schlierenzauer.

Stoch rose to 6th in the tournament standings, 60.5 points behind the leader. Kot moved to 24th, Żyła to 30th, Miętus to 36th, while Kubacki dropped to 26th, Hula to 34th, and Murańka to 45th.

In Bischofshofen qualifications, Stoch was 2nd, and all Poles qualified. KO pairings were:

- Stefan Hula vs. Severin Freund
- Krzysztof Miętus vs. Andreas Wank
- Piotr Żyła vs. Dawid Kubacki
- Maciej Kot vs. Richard Freitag
- Vegard Swensen vs. Kamil Stoch

Stoch's 131-meter jump placed 4th, 25.6 points ahead of Swensen. Kot's 132-meter jump earned 5th, 3.2 points better than Freitag. Hula tied for 19th (127 meters), 2.3 points ahead of Freund. Żyła was 31st among qualifiers. Miętus (39th, 123 meters) and Kubacki (42nd, 125 meters) missed the final round. In the second round, Żyła advanced to the scoring 30th position after a jump of 124.5 m, while Hula, landing at 122 m, dropped to 29th place. Kot, with a jump of 126 m, fell to 10th place (after the competition he stated that due to "swaying" on the inrun he made a mistake at the take-off). Meanwhile, Kamil Stoch maintained 4th place after a jump of 131.5 m, which, in his opinion, was very late.

Stoch finished 4th overall in the Four Hills Tournament with 1,027.2 points, 2 points behind 3rd-placed Tom Hilde and 73 points behind winner Schlierenzauer. He noted losing the podium by "one meter". Kot was 20th, Żyła 23rd, Hula 30th, Kubacki 31st, Miętus 37th, and Murańka 51st. Compared to the previous year, Poland had one more athlete in the final standings, with two in the top 30 versus one previously.

In the World Cup standings, Stoch rose to 8th, Kot to 19th, Żyła to 47th, and Hula to 46th. Kubacki dropped to 29th, Miętus to 42nd, and Murańka to 55th. Poland climbed to 6th in the Nations Cup, overtaking Russia.

=== Competitions in Poland and Japan ===
==== Individual competition in Wisła ====
On 8 January, in the qualifications for the competition in Wisła, 10 home competitors took part, 8 of whom advanced to the main competition: Maciej Kot (1st place), Dawid Kubacki (4th), Krzysztof Miętus (9th), Piotr Żyła (17th), Aleksander Zniszczoł (27th), Stefan Hula (31st), Bartłomiej Kłusek (34th), and Łukasz Rutkowski (38th). The other two placed outside the top 40: Jan Ziobro (43rd) and Klemens Murańka (47th). Meanwhile, Kamil Stoch, thanks to his position in the top 10 of the overall standings, was pre-qualified.

The next day marked the first competition ever held on the Malinka ski jumping hill. It took place in variable wind conditions. After the first round, the highest-ranked Pole was Piotr Żyła, who, after a 125 m jump, held 12th place. He admitted he was so nervous that he had trouble fastening his skis. Three places lower was Kamil Stoch, who jumped 122 m, which he considered the result of a late take-off and leaning too far forward. Maciej Kot was 17th (117.5 m). Stefan Hula placed 24th (120 m). Failing to qualify for the second round were: Aleksander Zniszczoł (116.5 m), Łukasz Rutkowski (117.5 m), and Krzysztof Miętus (112 m), who placed 35th–37th, as well as Dawid Kubacki, who, after a 111 m jump, finished 44th, and Bartłomiej Kłusek, who ended in 46th place after landing at 100 m.

In the second round, Hula dropped to 27th after a 117 m jump, while the other Poles improved their positions. Kot's attempt measured 125 m and moved him up to 13th place, while Stoch jumped 124.5 m and finished 7th. Meanwhile, Żyła achieved the best result of his career so far, finishing 6th after a 123 m jump.

After the competition, some Polish athletes complained of fatigue caused by the high frequency of competitions at the start of the year.

==== Team and individual competitions in Zakopane ====
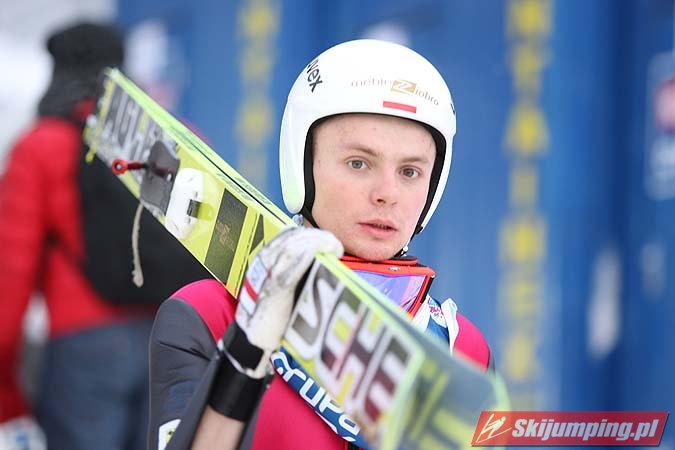
Jan Ziobro earned his first World Cup points in Zakopane

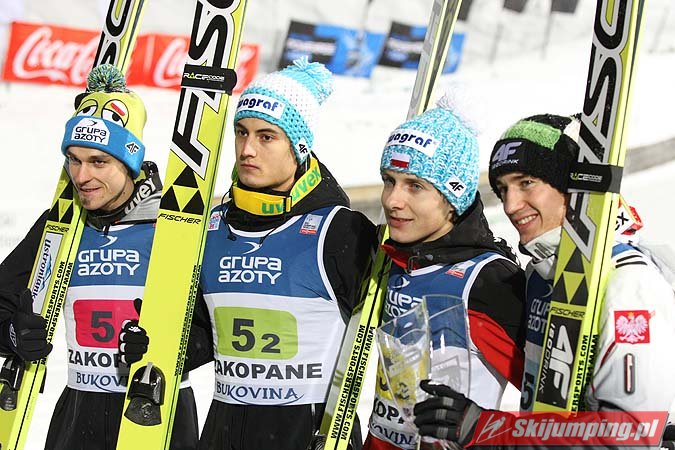
Polish team during the team competition in Zakopane

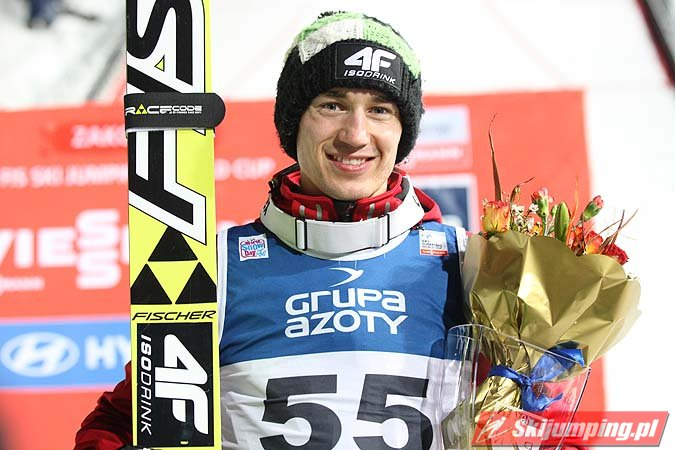
Kamil Stoch with flowers for 3rd place in the individual competition

On 11 January, a team competition was held on Wielka Krokiew. The first Pole to jump was Piotr Żyła, who reached 129 m, placing the Polish team in 2nd. After Maciej Kot's attempt of 133 m, the host nation took the lead. They maintained first place after Krzysztof Miętus landed at 118 m. In the last group, Kamil Stoch jumped 133 m – after the first round, Poland's lead over second-place Slovenia was 25.7 points.

In the second round, Żyła achieved 128.5 m and increased the lead over Slovenia by 3.2 points. Kot landed one and a half metres shorter, with the lead then at 24.1 points. In the third group, Miętus landed at 108 m, and the Polish team dropped to 2nd place, trailing Slovenia by 17.7 points. In the final group, Stoch jumped 130 m, and with Peter Prevc reaching 123.5 m, the Polish representatives finished in 2nd place overall, 9.1 points behind. In the unofficial individual standings, three Poles were among the top 4.

Qualifications for the individual event took place the same day as the main competition, on 12 January. Out of 11 host nation representatives entered, 8 Poles made it into the top 40, which guaranteed qualification, and in addition, Kamil Stoch was pre-qualified. The following Poles advanced: Kot, Żyła, Zniszczoł, Kubacki, Rutkowski, Hula, Krzysztof Miętus and Ziobro. Those who did not qualify for the first round were Murańka and Kłusek.

In the competition, Rutkowski was the first to jump, reaching 117.5 m. Ziobro jumped 129 m, which put him in the lead. Zniszczoł landed three and a half metres shorter and was in 2nd place. Hula reached 120.5 m and was 3rd , and after Krzysztof Miętus landed half a metre less, the top 4 positions were all occupied by Polish jumpers. Piotr Żyła jumped 124.5 m, which placed him 2nd, behind Ziobro. Dawid Kubacki, after a jump of 121.5 m, was 11th. Maciej Kot reached the same distance as the leader and pushed Ziobro into 2nd place, beating him by 1.1 points. Soon, however, the lead was taken by Norway's Fannemel, and then other foreign jumpers rotated into first place. Kamil Stoch jumped 133 m, which secured him the lead after the first round of competition on Wielka Krokiew, with a 3.4-point advantage over Jacobsen in 2nd. Also advancing to the second round were Kot in 9th place, Ziobro 11th, Żyła 17th (tied with Tepes), Zniszczoł 20th, Hula 27th, and Miętus 29th. Outside the top 30 were Kubacki in 32nd and Rutkowski in 46th.

In the second round, Krzysztof Miętus held his position with a jump of 114 m. Hula advanced to 21st after jumping 122.5 m. Zniszczoł fell to 23rd after landing half a metre longer. Żyła dropped to 18th despite a 130.5 m jump, one of the longest of the round, though made in favourable wind conditions. Jan Ziobro finished 20th after a 120.5 m jump. Maciej Kot landed at 128.5 m, half a metre shorter than in the first round, which moved him up to 5th. Kamil Stoch reached 127 m and fell to 3rd place – overtaken by Norwegians Jacobsen and Bardal, who both exceeded 130 m. According to Stoch, he failed to win due to a delayed take-off.

Compared to the situation after the conclusion of the Four Hills Tournament, the Polish team moved up to 5th place in the Nations Cup with 599 points, overtaking Japan. Individually, Stoch advanced from 8th to 7th, reducing his gap to the leader from 519 points to 455. Kot moved from 19th to 17th, Żyła from 47th to 35th, and Hula from 46th to 42nd. Meanwhile, Kubacki dropped from 29th to 33rd, Miętus from 42nd to 45th, and Murańka from 55th to 58th. Ziobro entered the standings in 49th place, earning his first World Cup points, while Zniszczoł appeared in 53rd.

==== Individual competitions in Sapporo ====
A week later, the first of two individual competitions took place in Sapporo, Japan. The Polish team consisted of Kamil Stoch, Maciej Kot, Dawid Kubacki, Piotr Żyła, and Krzysztof Miętus. After the first round, the highest-ranked Pole was Stoch, in 10th place, following a jump of 127.5 m. Maciej Kot was 19th with a jump of 121 m, while Dawid Kubacki was five places lower, jumping 1.5 m farther. Piotr Żyła shared 29th place with Peter Frenette after a 117.5 m jump. Krzysztof Miętus was disqualified for wearing an improper suit. In the second round, all Polish athletes improved their positions: Żyła moved up to 26th with a 119 m jump, Kubacki to 23rd with 118 m, Kot to 10th after a 138 m jump (only Tom Hilde jumped 1 m farther), and Stoch climbed one place higher to 9th with a 129 m jump.

The second competition at Okurayama was held under challenging weather conditions, with frequent interruptions. After the first round, Stoch was again the highest-ranked Pole, jumping 133 m and placing 6th, 3.2 points behind the leader, Jan Matura. Kubacki was 9th with a jump of 129.5 m, and Kot, who tied for the longest jump of the round at 135 m (tied with Wank), was two places lower. Miętus was 22nd after jumping 122 m, and Żyła occupied the last qualifying position, jumping 117.5 m.

In the final round, Stoch jumped 127.5 m, moving up to 5th place. Kot lost his top 10 position due to a delay caused by weather conditions and landed at 112.5 m, finishing 14th. Kubacki fell to 18th after a 109 m jump, Żyła improved to 22nd, and Miętus dropped to 25th, surpassing 100 m by only 2.5 m.

After the competitions in Japan, Stoch moved up one position in the overall World Cup standings to 6th with 459 points, 381 points behind the leader Thomas Morgenstern (who did not participate in Sapporo). Kot dropped one place to 18th, Kubacki rose from 33rd to 32nd, and Żyła and Miętus retained their positions at 35th and 45th, respectively. All Polish athletes who did not jump at Okurayama fell in the overall standings.

=== Aviation competitions and FIS Team Tour ===
==== Individual ski flying competitions in Vikersund ====
All Polish athletes who entered the qualifications for the individual ski flying competition in Vikersund advanced: Piotr Żyła (3rd place after a 214 m jump), Krzysztof Miętus, Dawid Kubacki (new personal best – 177.5 m), and Maciej Kot. Kamil Stoch was pre-qualified and jumped 218.5 m. After the first round of the main competition on 26 January, Stoch was the highest-ranked Pole. He jumped 213.5 m, placing 3rd, 2.5 points behind Andreas Schlierenzauer and 3.9 points behind the leader, Simon Ammann. Kot was 10th with a new personal best of 204.5 m, Żyła was 11th with a jump four meters shorter, and Miętus placed 28th after jumping 168.5 m. Only Kubacki did not advance to the second round, jumping 150.5 m and finishing 32nd.

In the final round, Miętus jumped 195.5 m, moving up three places. Żyła jumped 225 m and finished 6th overall. Kot again improved his personal best to 207 m but fell to 16th place. Stoch equaled Żyła's Polish record with a 232.5 m jump but finished 5th, behind Robert Kranjec and Andreas Stjernen, who reached the same distance. He lost 4.9 points to the winner, Schlierenzauer. Stoch stated after the competition that he had shortened his flight to land safely with a telemark, but was unable to do so.

During the second competition on the world's largest ski flying hill, all Polish athletes scored points. After the first round, Stoch was 8th with a 207 m jump, and Żyła was 9th with 216 m. Kot (202 m) and Miętus (198.5 m) were at the bottom of the second top 10. Kubacki was 30th with 166.5 m but moved up after Kozisek was disqualified. In the final round, Kubacki jumped 11 meters farther, finishing 28th. Miętus fell to 22nd with a jump of 172 m, Kot improved to 14th with a new personal best of 211 m, Żyła finished 10th (215 m), and Stoch 7th (222 m).

After the Vikersund competitions, Stoch rose to 5th in the overall standings, overtaking Andreas Kofler. He was 102 points behind Jacobsen and 66 points ahead of 6th-placed Tom Hilde. Kot dropped to 19th, Żyła moved up to 26th, becoming the 3rd-highest-scoring Pole of the season due to Kubacki's fall to 34th. Miętus climbed from 45th to 43rd. Poles who did not compete in Vikersund fell in the rankings (except Jan Ziobro, who remained 55th). In the ski flying classification, Stoch was 6th, Żyła 8th (both qualifying for the next ski flying competition), Kot 16th, Miętus 23rd, and Kubacki 31st.

==== Individual competitions in Harrachov ====
The same representatives of Poland were entered for the ski flying competitions in Harrachov. All of them qualified for the first competition – Kot, after a jump of 205 m, took 2nd place, Kubacki and Miętus placed in the second 10, while Stoch and Żyła were pre-qualified due to their positions in the Ski Flying World Cup standings. The main competition was postponed by one day, to 3 February, and was interrupted several times due to windy conditions. After the first round, the highest-ranked Pole was Stoch, who placed 12th after a jump of 181.5 m. His distance was one of the weakest among the athletes who advanced to the second round (only Żyła, ranked 23rd, jumped closer), but he received over 50 points of compensation for a lowered inrun gate. Miętus was 15th with a jump of 197.5 m, Kot was classified four places lower after a 190 m attempt. Żyła, mentioned earlier, jumped 172.5 m and was one place ahead of Kubacki, who had jumped 194.5 m. In the final round, Kubacki fell to 30th place after reaching only 114.5 m. His attempt was disrupted by a gust of wind, and later he said that he had to make an "emergency landing". Żyła jumped 171.5 m and moved up one place, while Kot advanced to 16th after landing at 179 m. Miętus reached 174.5 m and placed 14th. Stoch was the only one of the team to improve his distance compared to the first round. He jumped 187 m and finally took 9th place.

The second, single-round competition on the Czech hill was held later the same day. Stoch was 8th with a jump of 177.5 m, Żyła 13th (169 m), Kot 16th (163.5 m), Miętus 21st (159.5 m), while Kubacki failed to score points – he was 34th after a 148 m jump.

After the Harrachov events, coach Kruczek described the day as "crazy" and the competitions as risky. He also said that Kot had problems with his inrun position. Stoch remained in 5th place in the overall World Cup standings, increasing his gap to the leader to 599 points, but moving closer to the three athletes directly ahead of him, who had not competed in the Czech Republic. He trailed Jacobsen, in 4th place, by 41 points (previously 102). Kot returned to 18th place, while Żyła and Kubacki did not change their positions (26th and 34th, respectively). Miętus advanced from 43rd to 39th. The other Poles dropped to lower positions than before. In the Ski Flying World Cup standings, Stoch fell from 6th to 8th place, previously occupied by Żyła, who was now ranked 11th. Kot moved from 16th to 15th, Miętus from 23rd to 21st, and Kubacki dropped from 31st to 40th.

==== Team and individual competition on the large hill in Willingen ====
For the opening FIS Team Tour individual competition in Willingen, apart from Stoch, who was in the top 10 of the World Cup, only Piotr Żyła and Dawid Kubacki qualified. In the qualification round held on 8 February, they placed 24th and 39th, respectively. Stefan Hula and Maciej Kot finished in non-qualifying positions, 45th and 46th.

The following day, the team competition was held. In the first group Żyła jumped 127 m, placing the Polish team 8th. Miętus landed three metres farther, moving the team up to 6th. After Kubacki's 138 m attempt, the Poles advanced to 5th place, which they maintained after the fourth group, where Stoch reached 139.5 m. The second jumps of the Poles were, respectively: 122 m, 126.5 m, 132 m, and 140 m. After each group, the Polish team remained 5th. They lost 81.3 points to the winners, Slovenia. The individual competition scheduled for the following day was cancelled.

==== Individual competition on the large hill in Klingenthal ====
On 12 February, the qualifications for the Klingenthal competition were held. All entered Polish athletes advanced: Kubacki (6th place), Kot (28th), Żyła (34th), and Miętus (38th), while Stoch was prequalified.

After the first round of the competition, the highest-ranked Pole was Żyła in 5th place with a jump of 135 m. At that moment, he was leading ahead of Krzysztof Miętus, who jumped 10 metres farther but landed half a metre short of the hill record. After all athletes had jumped, Miętus was 7th. Kot was in 13th place (129 m), Stoch 18th (125.5 m), and Kubacki was the only Polish jumper not to score points, finishing 31st (121.5 m).

In the final round, Stoch landed at 131 m, moving up several positions, but was later disqualified for an incorrect suit and dropped to 30th place. Kot maintained 13th place with a jump of 124 m, Miętus fell to 11th with 121.5 m, marking his highest career position to date. Żyła ultimately finished 6th after a second jump of 128.5 m. The Polish jumpers retained 5th place in the FIS Team Tour standings, although they increased their deficit to the leaders, Slovenia.

==== Individual and team competitions on the ski flying hill in Oberstdorf ====
Due to the approaching World Championships, the Polish team at the ski flying events in Oberstdorf consisted of juniors: Klemens Murańka, Krzysztof Biegun, Jan Ziobro, Bartłomiej Kłusek, and Aleksander Zniszczoł. For Biegun, it was his World Cup and ski flying debut, while Ziobro and Kłusek had never competed in ski flying events before. In the main competition, Murańka (18th in qualifications), Biegun (21st), Ziobro (27th), and Kłusek (28th) advanced. Zniszczoł failed to pass the qualifiers, finishing 34th. During the training and qualification rounds, the debutants set personal bests: Biegun – 172.5 m, Ziobro – 159.5 m, and Kłusek – 156.5 m.

In the trial round, all Polish jumpers were in the last 10 places, though Biegun and Ziobro improved their personal bests to 175.5 m and 173.5 m, respectively. In the main competition, only Biegun scored points. After a first jump of 180 m, which was another personal best, he was 29th. Landing 8 metres shorter in the second round dropped him to 30th. Murańka was 33rd (177 m), Kłusek 39th (158.5 m), and Ziobro was disqualified for an incorrect suit.

Following this event, Biegun appeared 80th in the World Cup overall standings and 53rd in the ski flying classification. Compared to the situation before Oberstdorf, Stoch maintained 5th place in the overall World Cup after earning one point, though his deficit to Jacobsens was 41 points and to 4th-placed Freund 97 points. Kranjec reduced Stoch's lead over him from 51 to 7 points. Kot and Żyła held their positions (18th and 26th), Kubacki fell from 34th to 36th, and Miętus moved from 39th to 38th. All other Polish jumpers slightly dropped in the standings. Due to their absence in Oberstdorf, all main team members fell in the ski flying World Cup ranking: Stoch from 8th to 9th, Żyła from 11th to 13th, Kot from 15th to 18th, Miętus from 21st to 25th, and Kubacki from 40th to 48th. Poland, previously 5th in the FIS Team Tour, was overtaken by Japan and the Czech Republic.

The last event of the FIS Team Tour was the team ski flying competition in Oberstdorf. Compared to the individual event, Zniszczoł replaced Kłusek in the Polish lineup. In the first group, Biegun jumped 197.5 m, a personal best, and the team was 5th. Ziobro jumped 172 m in the second group, maintaining Poland's position. Zniszczoł then jumped 166.5 m, with Poland overtaken by Japan. Murańka landed at 176 m, while the Japanese competitor Takeuchi jumped 23.5 m farther. After the first round, Poland was 6th, 38.8 points behind Japan. In the final round, Poland retained 6th place after each group; the second jump distances were 184 m, 180.5 m (Ziobro's personal best), 179.5 m, and 178 m. The team ultimately finished 6th, 107.7 points behind Japan and 80.8 points ahead of the Czech Republic.

=== Final part with three victories ===
==== Team and individual competition on the large hill in Lahti ====
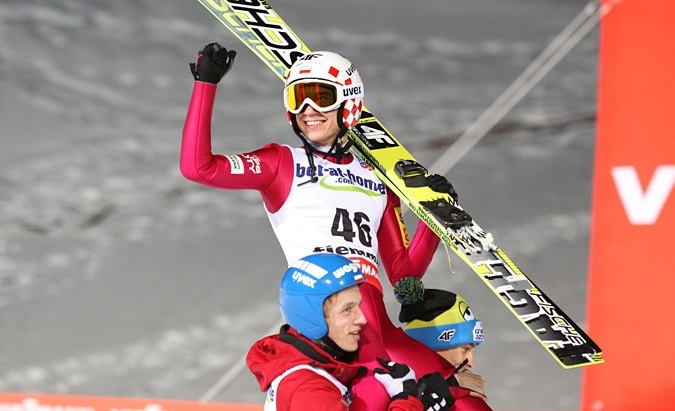
After winning the world championship title in Predazzo, Stoch went on to claim two more World Cup victories

The first World Cup competition after the World Championships – where the Poles had won two medals (Stoch's individual gold and a team bronze) – took place in Lahti. The same group of Poles that had competed at the World Championships took part. Thanks to an increased quota for Poland, allowing six jumpers, Stefan Hula joined the Poles who had already been competing in the World Cup. In both training rounds before the qualifications, Stoch achieved the best results, gaining a several-point advantage over his rivals. All Polish representatives qualified: Maciej Kot, who won the qualifications, Piotr Żyła (4th place), Krzysztof Miętus (15th), Dawid Kubacki (18th), and Stefan Hula (27th). Kamil Stoch was prequalified and did not jump.

The following day, Stoch won the trial round before the team event with a jump of 128 m. In the competition, Kot jumped first, achieving 119 m, which, in difficult weather conditions, gave Poland the lead after the first group. Piotr Żyła landed at 115.5 m – later admitting that he leaned too far forward and had to "save the jump". Krzysztof Miętus reached 119 m, while Kamil Stoch jumped 121.5 m from a lowered inrun. After the first round, Poland was in 4th place, only 2.3 points behind the Austrians in 3rd.

In the second round, Kot jumped 127.5 m, once again recording the best result in his group. Żyła landed 3.5 m shorter, and Miętus reached 120.5 m. Stoch again jumped from a lowered inrun, achieving 124 m – the best in his group. His Austrian rival scored 15 points less in the last round. This meant that the Polish team advanced to the lowest podium spot in the final standings, finishing 2.6 points behind Austria in 2nd place and 43.3 points behind the winning German team.

The next day, Stoch was once again the best in the trial round before the individual competition. After the first round, he was the highest-ranked Pole, sitting in 2nd place with a jump of 124 m. Maciej Kot was 8th with 125.5 m, Krzysztof Miętus was 20th with 117 m, and Piotr Żyła was 21nd after jumping half a metre further. Meanwhile, Dawid Kubacki and Stefan Hula placed 47th and 50th, respectively, and did not advance to the final round. Żyła's second jump measured 126.5 m, the second-best in that series, which moved him up to 12th place. Miętus, after landing at 121 m, climbed one place to 19th, while Kot, with another 125.5 m, advanced to 6th. Stoch landed at 123.5 m, half a metre shorter than in his first attempt, and dropped to 5th place. Ahead of him were Jacobsen and Freund, with whom he was directly competing for a spot on the overall World Cup podium.

==== Individual competition on the large hill in Kuopio ====
On 11 March, the qualifications for the Kuopio competition were held. Kot placed 5th, Żyła was 14th, Miętus 19th, Kubacki 23rd, and Hula 28th. Stoch was prequalified.

After the first round of the competition, Stoch led the standings with a jump of 135 m, holding a 7.9-point advantage over 2nd-placed Severin Freund. Kubacki was 16th with a 127 m jump, and Żyła was 25th with 123 m. The other three Poles – Miętus, Hula, and Kot – were outside the top 30, finishing 38th, 45th, and 47th, respectively. In the second round, Żyła landed at 129 m, moving up 10 places to 15th. Kubacki fell to 24th after jumping 117 m. Jumping last, Kamil Stoch reached 129 m and secured victory, finishing 10.9 points ahead of 2nd-placed Ito.

After the competitions in Finland, Stoch maintained 5th place in the overall World Cup standings, reducing his deficit to 4th-placed Jacobsen from 97 points to 45 points. Kot moved up from 18th to 17th, Żyła from 25th to 26th. Kubacki, Miętus, Hula, Ziobro, and Biegun kept their positions (36th, 38th, 53rd, 63rd, and 80th, respectively). Zniszczoł dropped from 66th to 67th, and Murańka from 73rd to 74th.

==== Individual competition on the large hill in Trondheim ====
The Trondheim competition began on 14 March, with Stoch winning both official training sessions. Piotr Żyła won the qualifications with a jump of 140 m, just one meter short of the hill record. The other Poles also qualified: Kubacki was 7th, Kot 9th, Hula 14th, and Miętus 35th. Stoch was prequalified and did not jump.

In the trial round the next day, Stoch placed 2nd. After the first round of the main competition, he landed at 131 m and was 3rd, trailing 3.6 points behind the leader Kranjec and 3.5 points behind 2nd-placed Freitag. Żyła was 10th with 129 m, Kot 13th with 127 m. In the third group of 10, Kubacki was 25th with 123.5 m, and Hula 29th with 121. Miętus was last, 50th, with 113 m. In the final round, Hula maintained his position with a jump of 127 m, while Kubacki moved up to 17th with 131.5 m. Kot fell to 24th with a jump of 126.5 m. Żyła advanced one spot to 9th after landing at 131 m. Stoch jumped 140 m, although his left ski shifted from a parallel position. He earned a total score of 280.4 points and claimed his second consecutive victory.

After Trondheim, Kamil Stoch moved up to 3rd place in the overall standings, as Freund and Jacobsen, previously ahead of him, finished 9th and 6th. His lead over 4th-placed Freund was two points. Żyła advanced from 24th to 23rd, while the remaining Polish competitors held their positions.

==== Individual competition on the large hill in Oslo ====
The next day, the competition began at Holmenkollbakken. Dawid Kubacki achieved the best result in the first training session. The following athletes qualified: Żyła (4th), Kot (6th), Miętus (16th), and Kubacki (25th). Stoch was prequalified and again did not jump in this round. Stefan Hula was disqualified for an invalid suit. Stoch won the trial round before the competition.

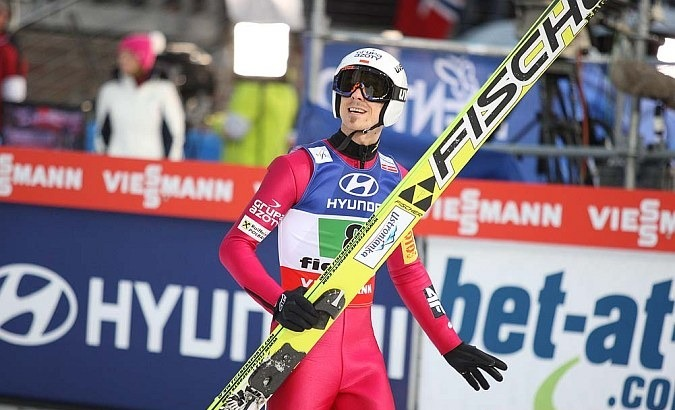
Piotr Żyła stood on the podium twice in the final part of the season

After the first jump, two Poles were in the top 3. Kamil Stoch was 2ndwith a jump of 132 m, trailing leader Kranjec by 1.6 points, while Piotr Żyła was 3rd, landing 3.5 m further but 4.5 points behind the Slovenian. Kot was 14th with 131.5 m, and Kubacki 30th with 124.5 m. Miętus did not advance to the second round, finishing 46th with 120 m. Kubacki's second jump of 125.5 m moved him to 20th place. Kot jumped 127 m and rose to 11th. Żyła's second jump reached 133.5 m, earning him the same total score as the previous leader Gregor Schlierenzauer. Stoch, jumping 121 m from a lowered inrun as requested by coach Kruczek, fell to 4th place. Kranjec landed at 126 m, resulting in a tie between Żyła and Schlierenzauer, marking the first career victory for the Polish jumper.

After the Oslo competition, Stoch's lead over the 4th-place athlete in the overall standings (Jacobsen, replacing Freund) increased from 2 points to 28. His deficit to 2nd-placed Bardal decreased from 85 to 71 points. Kot remained 17th, while Żyła moved from 24th to 19th thanks to the victory. Jan Ziobro fell from 63rd to 64th, and the remaining Polish competitors kept their positions.

==== Individual and team competitions in Planica ====
The season finale of the 2012–13 World Cup took place at Letalnica bratov Gorišek in Planica on 21 March. In the official training, Kamil Stoch and Piotr Żyła occupied the top two positions. In the qualifications for the first individual competition, Maciej Kot (10th), Piotr Żyła (15th), Dawid Kubacki (21st), and Krzysztof Miętus (29th) advanced, while Stefan Hula missed out and Kamil Stoch was prequalified.

After the first round of the main competition, the highest-placed Pole was Piotr Żyła, who was 4th after a jump of 212.5 m. Kot landed seven meters shorter, occupying 6th place, and Stoch was 11th with exactly 200 m. Kubacki and Miętus did not advance to the second round, finishing in 35th and 36th positions respectively, with jumps of 175.5 m and 182 m. In the final round, Stoch again reached 200 m, maintaining his position, while Kot fell to 8th place after a jump of 198.5 m. Piotr Żyła jumped 216.5 m, overtaking the previous 3rd-place Noriaki Kasai by 3.4 points and securing the lowest position on the podium.

Kamil Stoch reduced his deficit to the 2nd-place World Cup overall leader Bardal to 63 points, while his advantage over the 4th-place competitor shrank to 25 points. Freund occupied 4th place and, due to Jacobsen's injury, was Stoch's only rival for a podium finish in the overall standings. Maciej Kot remained in 17th place, and Piotr Żyła moved from 19th to 18th, seven points behind Kot. Other Polish representatives either held their positions or dropped by one place. In the ski flying standings, Stoch retained 9th place, Żyła advanced from 13th to 10th, and Kot from 18th to 16th. Miętus fell from 25th to 29th, Kubacki from 48th to 51st, and Biegun from 53rd to 56th.

Next was the team competition. In the first group, Piotr Żyła jumped 206.5 m with low judges' scores, which was the 5th-best result. Kot jumped two meters shorter, allowing Poland to rise to 3rd place, but after Miętus' jump of 192 m, the team returned to 5th place. This position was maintained after Stoch's jump of 202 m. In the second series, Żyła reached 214.5 m and Kot 207.5 m, moving Poland to 4th place. Miętus jumped 193.5 m, and Stoch achieved 211.5 m. The Polish team finished 4th, 3.5 points behind 3rd-place Austria.

In the trial round before the final competition, Żyła placed 2nd with a jump of 218 m. Poland could field four competitors in this competition: Stoch, Kot, Żyła, and Kubacki. After the first round, the highest-placed was the World Champion from Predazzo in 4th place, with 205.5 m. Żyła was 14th with 201.5 m, Kot 19th with 191 m, and Kubacki 22nd with 189 m. In the second round, Kubacki reached 190.5 m, moving up one place. Kot jumped 194 m, also gaining one position. Żyła jumped 216 m, which secured him 5th place. Stoch landed 207 m, finishing in 8th place.

Kamil Stoch retained 3rd place in the final overall World Cup standings for the 2012–13 season, as his only competitor, Severin Freund, finished 9th in the competition. Piotr Żyła, thanks to his high placement, moved up to 15th, overtaking Maciej Kot, who fell from 17th to 18th. The other Polish athletes did not change their positions. Żyła also advanced in the ski flying standings, surpassing Stoch to take 8th place. Stoch remained 9th, Kot 16th, Miętus fell from 29th to 30th, Biegun from 56th to 58th, and Kubacki rose from 51st to 42nd.

== Statistics ==
=== World Cup overall standings ===
Place	Athlete	Points	Deficit	Change
3.	Kamil Stoch	953	-667	+2
15.	Piotr Żyła	485	-1,135	+4
18.	Maciej Kot	460	-1,160	+17
36.	Dawid Kubacki	142	-1,478	NS
38.	Krzysztof Miętus	103	-1,517	+12
54.	Stefan Hula	28	-1,592	NS
65.	Jan Ziobro	11	-1,609	NS
68.	Aleksander Zniszczoł	8	-1,612	-21
75.	Klemens Murańka	6	-1,614	-19
81.	Krzysztof Biegun	1	-1,619	NS

=== World Cup ski flying standings ===
Place	Athlete	Points	Deficit	Change
8.	Piotr Żyła	200	-344	+15
9.	Kamil Stoch	198	-346	-3
16.	Maciej Kot	108	-436	+16
30.	Krzysztof Miętus	42	-502	+13
42.	Dawid Kubacki	14	-530	NS
58.	Krzysztof Biegun	1	-543	NS

=== Four Hills Tournament overall standings ===
Place	Athlete	Events	Jumps	Points	Deficit	Change
4.	Kamil Stoch	4	8	1,027.2	-73.0	+4
20.	Maciej Kot	4	7	840.6	-259.6	+14
23.	Piotr Żyła	4	7	798.8	-301.4	+16
30.	Stefan Hula	4	6	704.2	-396.0	+32
31.	Dawid Kubacki	4	6	698.0	-402.2	+32
37.	Krzysztof Miętus	4	5	569.1	-531.1	NS
51.	Klemens Murańka	1	2	242.6	-857.6	NS

=== Individual World Cup podiums ===
No.	Date	Year	Location	Hill	K-Point	HS	Athlete	Jump 1	Jump 2	Score	Pos.	Deficit	Winner	Source
1.	15 December	2012	(Switzerland) Engelberg	Gross-Titlis-Schanze	K-125	HS-137	Kamil Stoch	132.5 m	134.0 m	272.5 pts	2nd	0.1 pts	Andreas Kofler	
2.	4 January	2013	(Austria) Innsbruck	Bergisel	K-120	HS-130	Kamil Stoch	124.5 m	123.0 m	240.9 pts	2nd	12.8 pts	Gregor Schlierenzauer	
3.	12 January	2013	(Poland) Zakopane	Wielka Krokiew	K-120	HS-134	Kamil Stoch	133.0 m	127.0 m	268.7 pts	3rd	4.6 pts	Anders Jacobsen	
4.	12 March	2013	(Finland) Kuopio	Puijo	K-120	HS-127	Kamil Stoch	135.0 m	129.0 m	268.1 pts	1st	–	–	
5.	15 March	2013	(Norway) Trondheim	Granåsen	K-123	HS-140	Kamil Stoch	131.0 m	140.0 m	280.4 pts	1st	–	–	
6.	17 March	2013	(Norway) Oslo	Holmenkollbakken	K-120	HS-134	Piotr Żyła	135.5 m	133.5 m	270.1 pts	1st	–	–	
7.	22 March	2013	(Slovenia) Planica	Letalnica	K-185	HS-215	Piotr Żyła	212.5 m	216.5 m	402.5 pts	3rd	9.7 pts	Gregor Schlierenzauer	

=== Individual competition results ===
Kamil Stoch
Lillehammer	Lillehammer	Ruka	Krasnaja Polana	Krasnaja Polana	Engelberg	Engelberg	Oberstdorf	Garmisch-Partenkirchen	Innsbruck	Bischofshofen	Wisła	Zakopane	Sapporo	Sapporo	Vikersund	Vikersund	Harrachov	Harrachov	Klingenthal	Oberstdorf	Lahti	Kuopio	Trondheim	Oslo	Planica	Planica	points
30	36	q	–	–	2	14	13	6	2	4	7	3	9	5	5	7	9	8	30	–	5	1	1	4	11	8	953
'Piotr Żyła'
Lillehammer	Lillehammer	Ruka	Krasnaja Polana	Krasnaja Polana	Engelberg	Engelberg	Oberstdorf	Garmisch-Partenkirchen	Innsbruck	Bischofshofen	Wisła	Zakopane	Sapporo	Sapporo	Vikersund	Vikersund	Harrachov	Harrachov	Klingenthal	Oberstdorf	Lahti	Kuopio	Trondheim	Oslo	Planica	Planica	points
36	43	48	–	–	36	37	31	30	22	30	6	18	26	22	6	10	22	13	6	–	12	15	9	1	3	5	485
'Maciej Kot'
Lillehammer	Lillehammer	Ruka	Krasnaja Polana	Krasnaja Polana	Engelberg	Engelberg	Oberstdorf	Garmisch-Partenkirchen	Innsbruck	Bischofshofen	Wisła	Zakopane	Sapporo	Sapporo	Vikersund	Vikersund	Harrachov	Harrachov	Klingenthal	Oberstdorf	Lahti	Kuopio	Trondheim	Oslo	Planica	Planica	points
25	48	32	28	22	17	13	50	5	9	10	13	5	10	14	16	14	16	16	13	–	6	47	24	11	8	18	460
'Krzysztof Miętus'
Lillehammer	Lillehammer	Ruka	Krasnaja Polana	Krasnaja Polana	Engelberg	Engelberg	Oberstdorf	Garmisch-Partenkirchen	Innsbruck	Bischofshofen	Wisła	Zakopane	Sapporo	Sapporo	Vikersund	Vikersund	Harrachov	Harrachov	Klingenthal	Oberstdorf	Lahti	Kuopio	Trondheim	Oslo	Planica	Planica	points
44	26	47	43	q	23	31	33	38	27	39	37	29	–	25	25	23	14	21	11	–	19	38	50	46	36	–	103
'Dawid Kubacki'
Lillehammer	Lillehammer	Ruka	Krasnaja Polana	Krasnaja Polana	Engelberg	Engelberg	Oberstdorf	Garmisch-Partenkirchen	Innsbruck	Bischofshofen	Wisła	Zakopane	Sapporo	Sapporo	Vikersund	Vikersund	Harrachov	Harrachov	Klingenthal	Oberstdorf	Lahti	Kuopio	Trondheim	Oslo	Planica	Planica	points
34	45	22	30	17	9	17	26	28	36	42	44	32	23	18	32	28	30	34	31	–	47	24	17	20	35	21	142
'Stefan Hula'
Lillehammer	Lillehammer	Ruka	Krasnaja Polana	Krasnaja Polana	Engelberg	Engelberg	Oberstdorf	Garmisch-Partenkirchen	Innsbruck	Bischofshofen	Wisła	Zakopane	Sapporo	Sapporo	Vikersund	Vikersund	Harrachov	Harrachov	Klingenthal	Oberstdorf	Lahti	Kuopio	Trondheim	Oslo	Planica	Planica	points
–	–	–	–	–	–	–	21	44	39	29	27	21	–	–	–	–	–	–	–	–	50	45	29	q	q	–	28
'Jan Ziobro'
Lillehammer	Lillehammer	Ruka	Krasnaja Polana	Krasnaja Polana	Engelberg	Engelberg	Oberstdorf	Garmisch-Partenkirchen	Innsbruck	Bischofshofen	Wisła	Zakopane	Sapporo	Sapporo	Vikersund	Vikersund	Harrachov	Harrachov	Klingenthal	Oberstdorf	Lahti	Kuopio	Trondheim	Oslo	Planica	Planica	points
–	–	–	–	–	–	–	–	–	–	–	q	20	–	–	–	–	–	–	–	–	–	–	–	–	–	–	11
'Aleksander Zniszczoł'
Lillehammer	Lillehammer	Ruka	Krasnaja Polana	Krasnaja Polana	Engelberg	Engelberg	Oberstdorf	Garmisch-Partenkirchen	Innsbruck	Bischofshofen	Wisła	Zakopane	Sapporo	Sapporo	Vikersund	Vikersund	Harrachov	Harrachov	Klingenthal	Oberstdorf	Lahti	Kuopio	Trondheim	Oslo	Planica	Planica	points
–	–	–	–	–	–	–	–	–	–	–	35	23	–	–	–	–	–	–	–	q	–	–	–	–	–	–	8
'Klemens Murańka'
Lillehammer	Lillehammer	Ruka	Krasnaja Polana	Krasnaja Polana	Engelberg	Engelberg	Oberstdorf	Garmisch-Partenkirchen	Innsbruck	Bischofshofen	Wisła	Zakopane	Sapporo	Sapporo	Vikersund	Vikersund	Harrachov	Harrachov	Klingenthal	Oberstdorf	Lahti	Kuopio	Trondheim	Oslo	Planica	Planica	points
–	–	–	–	–	28	40	28	q	–	–	q	q	–	–	–	–	–	–	–	40	–	–	–	–	–	–	6
'Krzysztof Biegun'
Lillehammer	Lillehammer	Ruka	Krasnaja Polana	Krasnaja Polana	Engelberg	Engelberg	Oberstdorf	Garmisch-Partenkirchen	Innsbruck	Bischofshofen	Wisła	Zakopane	Sapporo	Sapporo	Vikersund	Vikersund	Harrachov	Harrachov	Klingenthal	Oberstdorf	Lahti	Kuopio	Trondheim	Oslo	Planica	Planica	points
–	–	–	–	–	–	–	–	–	–	–	–	–	–	–	–	–	–	–	–	30	–	–	–	–	–	–	1
'Bartłomiej Kłusek'
Lillehammer	Lillehammer	Ruka	Krasnaja Polana	Krasnaja Polana	Engelberg	Engelberg	Oberstdorf	Garmisch-Partenkirchen	Innsbruck	Bischofshofen	Wisła	Zakopane	Sapporo	Sapporo	Vikersund	Vikersund	Harrachov	Harrachov	Klingenthal	Oberstdorf	Lahti	Kuopio	Trondheim	Oslo	Planica	Planica	points
q	46	–	47	40	–	–	–	–	–	–	46	q	–	–	–	–	–	–	–	39	–	–	–	–	–	–	0
'Łukasz Rutkowski'
Lillehammer	Lillehammer	Ruka	Krasnaja Polana	Krasnaja Polana	Engelberg	Engelberg	Oberstdorf	Garmisch-Partenkirchen	Innsbruck	Bischofshofen	Wisła	Zakopane	Sapporo	Sapporo	Vikersund	Vikersund	Harrachov	Harrachov	Klingenthal	Oberstdorf	Lahti	Kuopio	Trondheim	Oslo	Planica	Planica	points
–	–	–	–	–	–	–	–	–	–	–	36	46	–	–	–	–	–	–	–	–	–	–	–	–	–	–	0
Legend
1 2 3 4-10 11-30 below 30 – – disqualified q – did not qualify – – did not start
