= Poland at the 2012 FIS Ski Jumping Grand Prix =

Polish ski jumping team performance in the 2012 Summer Grand Prix

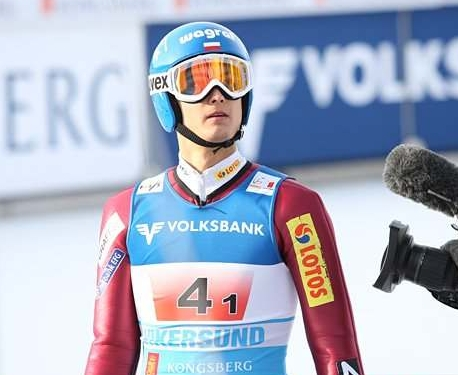
Maciej Kot, 5th in the overall standings. Photo from February 2012

The Polish national ski jumping team competed in the 19th edition of the FIS Ski Jumping Grand Prix in 2012.

The Polish team amassed 1,172 points, securing 4th place in the team standings, with 8 athletes contributing points. In the sole men's team competition, Poland finished 2nd. Individually, Maciej Kot achieved the best result, placing 5th overall with two victories. Dawid Kubacki ranked 8th, earning one 3rd-place podium finish.

== Background ==
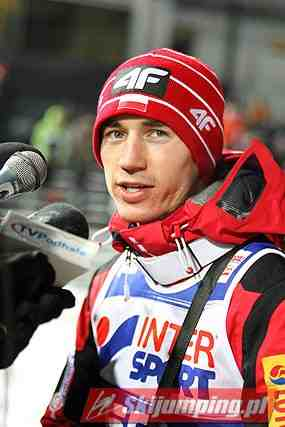
Kamil Stoch, 2nd in the previous Summer Grand Prix edition

The previous Summer Grand Prix season marked the first without Poland's long-time leader, Adam Małysz, who retired. Poland was 2nd in the team standings, with Kamil Stoch finishing 2nd overall, winning two events, and Piotr Żyła and Maciej Kot placing in the top 10. The prior year, Stoch was 2nd, Małysz 3rd, and Kubacki 5th.

In the 2011–12 FIS Ski Jumping World Cup, Poland placed 6th in the Nations Cup, with Stoch finishing 5th overall, earning seven individual podiums.

The International Ski and Snowboard Federation introduced new rules before the season, including tighter-fitting suits. These changes led to 29 disqualifications in the opening 2012 Summer Continental Cup events in Kranj.

== Season overview ==
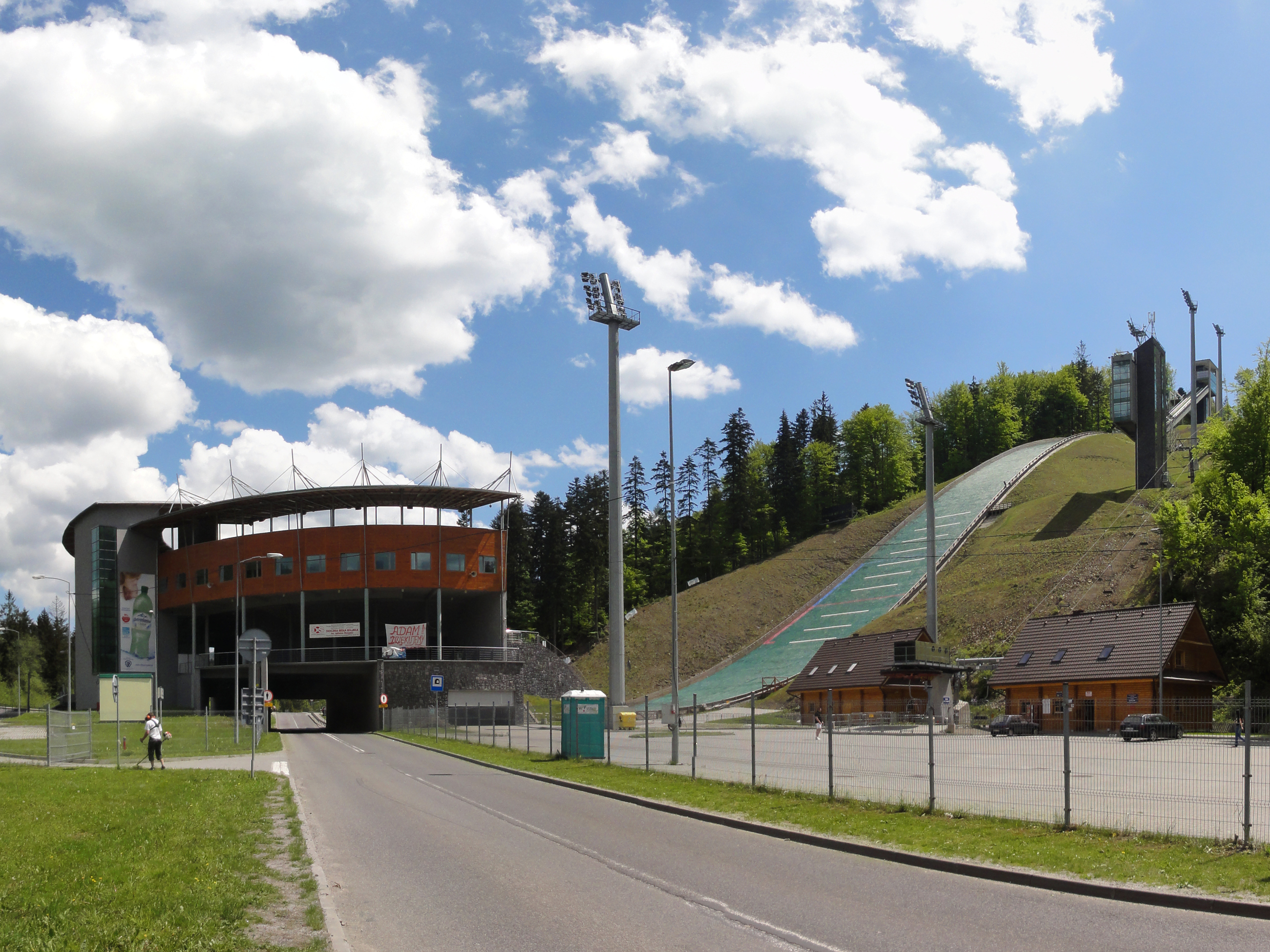
Malinka ski jumping hill in Wisła

=== Team and individual competitions in Wisła ===
The 2012 FIS Ski Jumping Grand Prix began in Wisła, Poland, at the Malinka ski jumping hill. On 19 July, qualifications for the individual event saw 10 Polish jumpers compete, including six from the national quota. Kamil Stoch and Piotr Żyła were pre-qualified due to their 2011–12 FIS Ski Jumping World Cup rankings. Dawid Kubacki won the qualifications with a 122 m jump, joined by seven other Poles in the top 40: Bartłomiej Kłusek, Maciej Kot, Krzysztof Biegun, Marcin Bachleda, Krzysztof Miętus, and Andrzej Zapotoczny. Klemens Murańka and Rafał Śliż failed to qualify. The next day, the team participated in a training session with children and met fans.

On 20 July, the team competition at Wisła's Malinka hill was limited to one round due to a lighting failure. Piotr Żyła jumped 120.5 m, placing Poland 5th after the first group. Subsequent jumps by Kamil Stoch (122.5 m), Dawid Kubacki (123.5 m), and Maciej Kot (125 m) advanced Poland to 2nd place, 1.2 points behind Slovenia. Kot earned the highest individual score of 128.1 points.

The individual competition followed on 21 July. Krzysztof Biegun opened with a 120.5 m jump, leading briefly, but Andrzej Zapotoczny and Marcin Bachleda ended in the first round (31st and 41st). Biegun was 17th after the first round, while Bartłomiej Kłusek's 121.5 m jump placed him 13th. Dawid Kubacki's 120.5 m jump ranked him 23rd. Among pre-qualified jumpers, Krzysztof Miętus' 108.5 m jump was the shortest, placing him last (50th). Aleksander Zniszczoł finished 33rd (117.5 m). Maciej Kot led with a 128 m jump, 7.2 points ahead of Simon Ammann, while Kamil Stoch tied for 3rd with a 128 m jump.

In the second round, Piotr Żyła's 124 m jump moved him to 16th, and Kubacki's 120.5 m jump lifted him to 15th. Biegun's 117.5 m jump dropped him to 20th, while Kłusek held 13th with 122.5 m. Stoch's 124.5 m jump resulted in a 7th-place finish. Kot's 123 m jump secured his first Summer Grand Prix individual victory. Poland took the lead in the team standings. Kot noted pressure before his second jump but credited his work with the team psychologist:

There was no big burst of joy; although this is the biggest success of my career so far, there's no need to make a big fuss. It's just the start of summer, and many top jumpers weren't here. The victory is pleasing, boosts confidence, and shows our work is on the right track. We're preparing for winter, after all.

— Maciej Kot

Coach Łukasz Kruczek praised Stoch's progress, noting his performance exceeded expectations despite recent struggles. Stoch acknowledged the coach's trust.

=== Individual competition in Courchevel ===
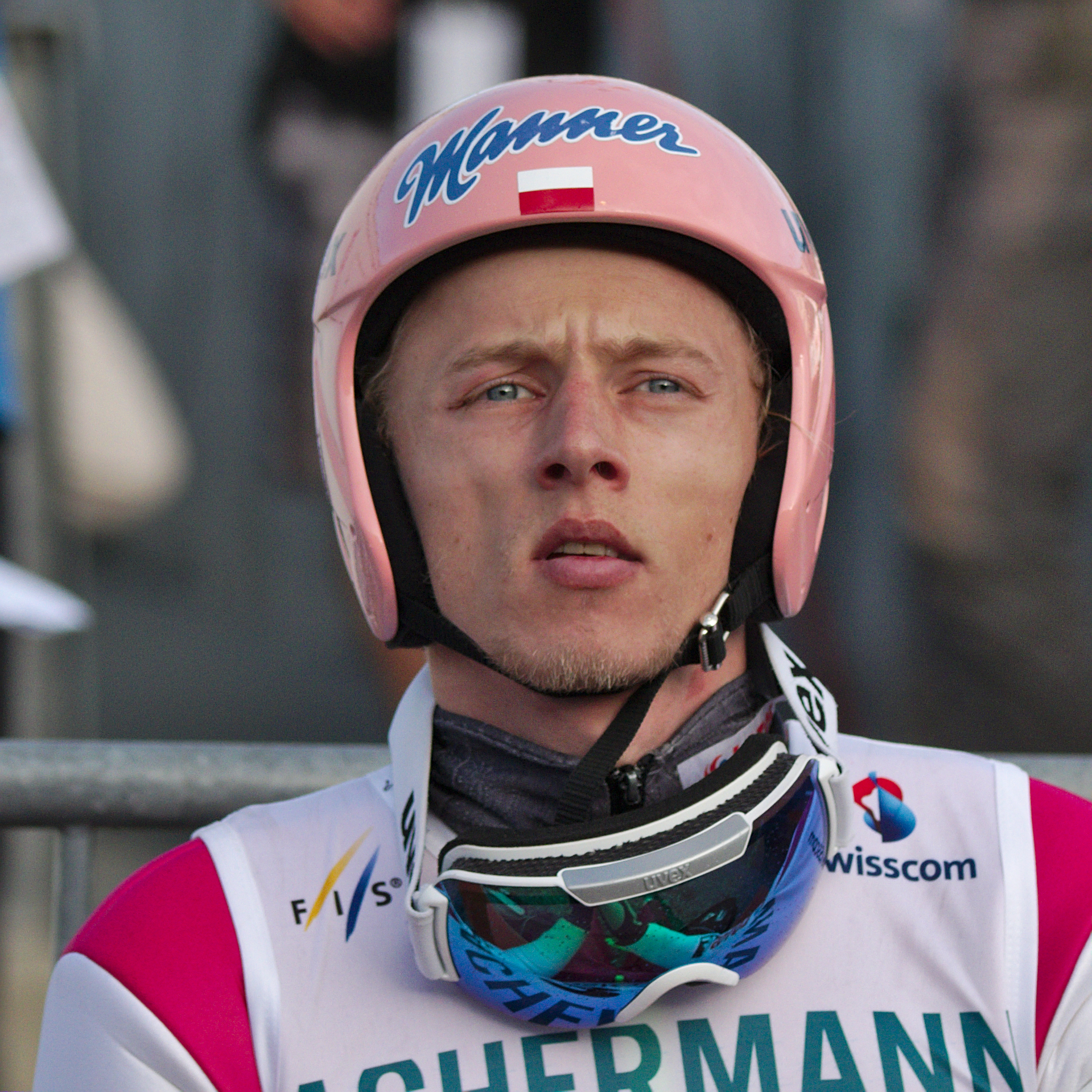
Dawid Kubacki, highest-ranked in Courchevel. Photo from 2014

In qualifications for the 15 August Courchevel event, Dawid Kubacki placed 3rd, joined by Piotr Żyła and Krzysztof Miętus in the top 40. Maciej Kot and Bartłomiej Kłusek were pre-qualified due to their overall rankings. Stoch did not compete.

In the first round, Miętus finished 46th (110.5 m), ending his participation. Kubacki (122.5 m) tied for 4th with Andreas Wank, Kot (123.5 m) was 6th, Kłusek (116 m) 16th, and Żyła (115.5 m) 21st.

In the second round, Żyła's 123.5 m jump moved him to 15th, Kłusek's 113.5 m dropped him to 30th, Kot's 122 m placed him 7th, and Kubacki's 122.5 m secured 5th. Coach Kruczek noted the team maintained their Wisła form and planned to refine Kubacki's jumping style.

Kot retained the overall lead, increasing his advantage to 27 points. Kubacki rose to 8th, while Stoch (15th), Żyła (17th), Kłusek (22nd), and Biegun (30th) dropped. Poland fell to 3rd in the team standings, behind Germany and Japan, as they did not compete in Courchevel's mixed team event.

=== Individual competition in Hinterzarten ===
On 19 August in Hinterzarten, all five Polish jumpers (Kubacki, Kot, Żyła, Miętus, Kłusek) qualified for the main event. Kubacki had the best trial round jump. After the first round, Kubacki was 5th (98.5 m), describing his jump as "not fully committed" and less fluid. Żyła tied for 7th with Yuta Watase (98.5 m), Kot was 11th (91.5 m, affected by unfavorable wind), and Miętus and Kłusek were in the 30s. In the second round, Kot (96 m) and Żyła (103.5 m) held their positions, while Kubacki (103.5 m) dropped to 6th, 0.4 points behind Watase and 10.6 behind winner Andreas Wank.

Kot dropped to 3rd overall, overtaken by Reruhi Shimizu and Wank. Kubacki rose to 7th, Żyła to 10th, while Stoch (20th), Kłusek (26th), and Biegun (39th) fell. Poland dropped to 4th in the team standings, missing the mixed team event. Kruczek noted Miętus' technical struggles and Kot's challenges with wind conditions and the abolished air corridor. The team trained in Ramsau am Dachstein afterward.

=== Individual competitions in Hakuba ===
In the first Hakuba event on 25 August, Bartłomiej Kłusek led Poles after the first round with a 7th-place 120.5 m jump, followed by Kubacki (13th, 120.5 m) and Krzysztof Miętus (27th, 115 m). In the second round, Kłusek's 121.5 m jump dropped him to 14th, Kubacki's 129.5 m (second-longest) earned 5th, and Miętus' 122 m moved him to 23rd. Krzysztof Biegun (38th) and Aleksander Zniszczoł (43rd) scored no points.

The second Hakuba event on 26 August faced variable weather. After the first round, Kłusek was 8th (119.5 m), Kubacki 11th (113 m), Zniszczoł 13th (115 m), Miętus 35th (102 m), and Biegun 46th (93.5 m). In the second round, Zniszczoł fell to 14th (126 m), Kłusek held 8th (115.5 m), and Kubacki's 127 m jump secured 3rd, 0.2 points ahead of Vladimir Zografski. Kubacki noted his first jump was marred by stress and felt the podium was aided by poor conditions for others.

After Hakuba, Kubacki rose to 4th overall, 6 points behind Shimizu and 203 behind Wank. Kot fell to 8th, Kłusek rose to 14th, Żyła dropped to 17th, Stoch to 31st, and Biegun to 48th. Zniszczoł and Miętus earned their first points, ranking 40th and 52nd. Poland returned to 3rd in the team standings.

=== Individual competitions in Almaty ===
In Almaty at the Sunkar International Ski Jumping Complex, only Bartłomiej Kłusek and Piotr Żyła competed. In the first event, Kłusek was 16th after the first round (126.5 m), and Żyła 4th (130 m). Kłusek's second-round 120 m jump dropped him to 18th, while Żyła was disqualified for an improper suit. In the single-round second event, Żyła placed 20th (123 m) and Kłusek 38th.

Kubacki dropped to 7th, Kot to 9th, and other Poles fell in the standings. Poland remained 4th in the team rankings.

=== Individual competition in Hinzenbach ===
For the 29–30 September Hinzenbach event, six Poles were entered, but Kłusek failed qualifications (54th). Żyła and Zniszczoł ended in the first round (38th and 34th). Kubacki's 83.5 m jump placed him 20th, Stoch's 87 m jump 15th, and Kot's 87.5 m jump made him the leader with 117 points, 2.6 ahead of Taku Takeuchi. In the second round, Kubacki (82.5 m) and Stoch (88 m) finished 19th and 9th, while Kot's 88.5 m jump secured his second victory.

Kruczek noted issues with Żyła, Kłusek, and Zniszczoł's approach positions and praised Stoch's 9th place on the challenging hill:

We hadn't faced the world's elite for a while, as they competed without us. We heard about their performances and came here for a test to see where we stand, whether we're lagging, and how to adjust our technical training to be well-prepared for winter.

— Łukasz Kruczek

Kot rose to 6th overall with 260 points, 173 behind Wank and 45 behind Ammann. Stoch climbed to 30th, while Kubacki (8th), Kłusek (20th), Żyła (24th, tied with Severin Freund), Zniszczoł (55th, tied with Dejan Judež), Biegun (63rd), and Miętus (67th, tied with Anders Johnson) dropped.

=== Individual competition in Klingenthal ===
In Klingenthal, Zniszczoł failed qualifications (41st, 0.4 points short). Stoch placed 3rd in qualifications. After the first round, Kot was 4th (133 m, 3 points behind Shimizu), Stoch 17th (129.5 m), Żyła 18th (131 m), Kłusek 31st (127 m), and Kubacki 37th (122.5 m). In the second round, Kot held 4th (130 m), Stoch rose to 11th (133 m), and Żyła dropped to 27th (124.5 m).

== Statistics ==
=== Overall standings ===
Rank	Athlete	Events	Points
5	Maciej Kot	5	310
8	Dawid Kubacki	7	218
25	Kamil Stoch	3	89
26	Bartłomiej Kłusek	8	84
26	Piotr Żyła	7	84
58	Aleksander Zniszczoł	4	18
67	Krzysztof Biegun	3	11
72	Krzysztof Miętus	5	8

=== Individual competition results ===
Maciej Kot
Wisła	Courchevel	Hinterzarten	Hakuba	Hakuba	Almaty	Almaty	Hinzenbach	Klingenthal	Points
1	7	11	–	–	–	–	1	4	310
Dawid Kubacki
Wisła	Courchevel	Hinterzarten	Hakuba	Hakuba	Almaty	Almaty	Hinzenbach	Klingenthal	Points
15	5	6	5	3	–	–	19	37	218
Kamil Stoch
Wisła	Courchevel	Hinterzarten	Hakuba	Hakuba	Almaty	Almaty	Hinzenbach	Klingenthal	Points
7	–	–	–	–	–	–	9	11	89
Bartłomiej Kłusek
Wisła	Courchevel	Hinterzarten	Hakuba	Hakuba	Almaty	Almaty	Hinzenbach	Klingenthal	Points
13	30	36	14	8	18	38	q	31	84
Piotr Żyła
Wisła	Courchevel	Hinterzarten	Hakuba	Hakuba	Almaty	Almaty	Hinzenbach	Klingenthal	Points
16	15	7	–	–	29	20	38	27	84
Aleksander Zniszczoł
Wisła	Courchevel	Hinterzarten	Hakuba	Hakuba	Almaty	Almaty	Hinzenbach	Klingenthal	Points
33	–	–	43	14	–	–	34	q	18
Krzysztof Biegun
Wisła	Courchevel	Hinterzarten	Hakuba	Hakuba	Almaty	Almaty	Hinzenbach	Klingenthal	Points
20	–	–	38	46	–	–	–	–	11
Krzysztof Miętus
Wisła	Courchevel	Hinterzarten	Hakuba	Hakuba	Almaty	Almaty	Hinzenbach	Klingenthal	Points
50	46	35	23	35	–	–	–	–	8
Andrzej Zapotoczny
Wisła	Courchevel	Hinterzarten	Hakuba	Hakuba	Almaty	Almaty	Hinzenbach	Klingenthal	Points
31	–	–	–	–	–	–	–	–	0
Marcin Bachleda
Wisła	Courchevel	Hinterzarten	Hakuba	Hakuba	Almaty	Almaty	Hinzenbach	Klingenthal	Points
41	–	–	–	–	–	–	–	–	0
Klemens Murańka
Wisła	Courchevel	Hinterzarten	Hakuba	Hakuba	Almaty	Almaty	Hinzenbach	Klingenthal	Points
q	–	–	–	–	–	–	–	–	0
Rafał Śliż
Wisła	Courchevel	Hinterzarten	Hakuba	Hakuba	Almaty	Almaty	Hinzenbach	Klingenthal	Points
q	–	–	–	–	–	–	–	–	0
Legend
1 2 3 4-10 11-30 Below 30 q – Athlete did not qualify: – Athlete did not compete
