= Océane Avocat Gros =

French ski jumper

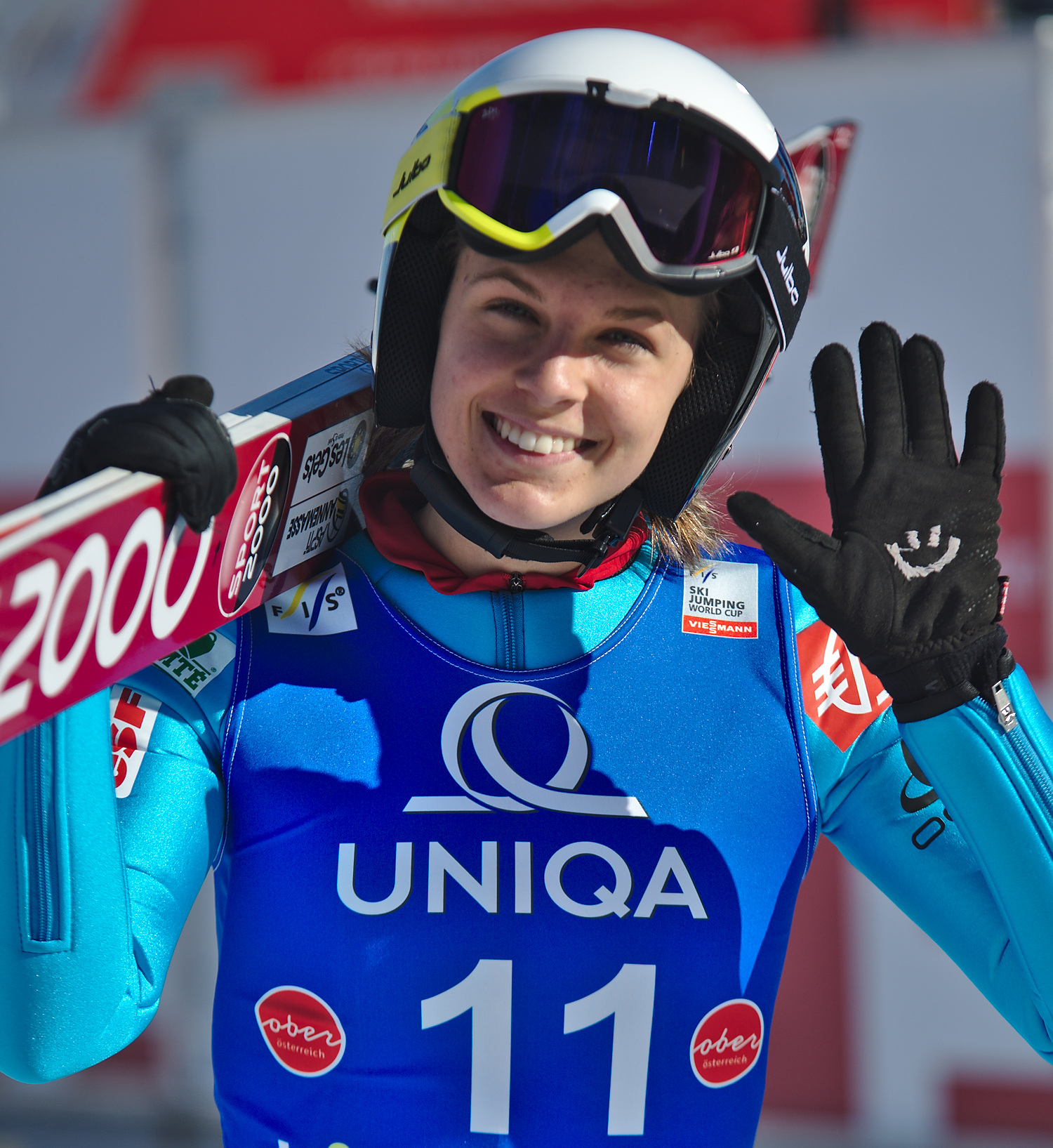
- Avocat Gros in Hinzenbach, 2017

Personal information
- Nationality: France
- Born: 23 April 1997 (age 29)

Sport
- Sport: Skiing
- Club: ASPTT Annemasse

World Cup career
- Seasons: 2017–2021
- Indiv. starts: 39
- Team starts: 2
Medal record
Women's ski jumping
Junior World Championships
Silver medal – second place	Liberec 2013	Team NH
- Updated on 28 January 2023

Océane Avocat Gros (born 23 April 1997) is a French ski jumper. She has competed at World Cup level since the 2016/17 season, with her best individual World Cup result being 19th place in Pyeongchang on 15 February 2017. At the 2013 Junior World Championships, she won a team silver medal.
