= Ski jumping at the 2013 Winter Universiade =

Ski jumping at the 2013 Winter Universiade was held at the Trampolino Dal Ben in Predazzo from December 14 to December 20, 2013.

== Men's events ==
Event	Gold		Silver		Bronze	
Normal hill	Sami Niemi; Finland	270.3	Krzysztof Biegun; Poland	267.2	Mikhail Maksimochkin; Russia	265.8
Large hill	Krzysztof Biegun; Poland	278.6	Sami Niemi; Finland	267.4	Junshiro Kobayashi; Japan	259.2
Large hill team	Poland (POL); Aleksander Zniszczoł; Bartłomiej Kłusek; Krzysztof Biegun	755.5	Russia (RUS); Roman Trofimov; Alexander Sardyko; Mikhail Maksimochkin	727.7	Austria (AUT); Daniel Huber; David Unterberger; Clemens Aigner	721.9

== Women's events ==
Event	Gold		Silver		Bronze	
Normal hill	Katja Požun; Slovenia	261.0	Michaela Doleželová; Czech Republic	250.5	Irina Avvakumova; Russia	245.3

== Mixed events ==
Event	Gold		Silver		Bronze	
Team	Russia (RUS); Irina Avvakumova; Mikhail Maksimochkin	508.1	Finland (FIN); Julia Kykkänen; Sami Niemi	505.1	Slovenia (SLO); Katja Požun; Mitja Mežnar	500.6
