= 2012 FIS Ski Jumping Grand Prix =

International ski jumping competition

Grand Prix 2012
Discipline	Men	Women
Overall	(Germany) Andreas Wank	(Japan) Sara Takanashi
Nations Cup	Japan	Japan

Competition
Edition	19th	1st
Locations	7	3
Individual	9	4
Team	1	—
Mixed	2	2

The 2012 FIS Ski Jumping Grand Prix was the 19th Summer Grand Prix season in ski jumping on plastic for men and the 1st for ladies.

Mixed team was also introduced for the 1st time in history.

Season began on 20 July 2012 in Wisła, Poland and ends on 3 October 2012 in Klingenthal, Germany.

Other competitive circuits this season included the World Cup and Continental Cup.

== Calendar ==
=== Men ===
Num	Season	Date	Place	Hill	Size	Winner	Second	Third	Yellow bib	Ref.
128	1	21 July 2012	(Poland) Wisła	Malinka HS134	LH	(Poland) Maciej Kot	(Switzerland) Simon Ammann	(Austria) Wolfgang Loitzl	(Poland) Maciej Kot	
129	2	15 August 2012	(France) Courchevel	Tremplin du Praz HS132	LH	(Japan) Reruhi Shimizu	(Germany) Andreas Wank	(Norway) Tom Hilde	(Poland) Maciej Kot	
130	3	19 August 2012	(Germany) Hinterzarten	Rothaus-Schanze HS108	NH	(Germany) Andreas Wank	(Japan) Reruhi Shimizu	(Czech Republic) Lukáš Hlava	(Germany) Andreas Wank	
131	4	25 August 2012	(Japan) Hakuba	Olympic Ski Jumps HS131 (night)	LH	(Germany) Andreas Wank	(Switzerland) Simon Ammann	(Japan) Noriaki Kasai	(Germany) Andreas Wank	
132	5	26 August 2012	(Japan) Hakuba	Olympic Ski Jumps HS131	LH	(Germany) Andreas Wank	(Slovenia) Jurij Tepeš	(Poland) Dawid Kubacki	(Germany) Andreas Wank	
133	6	22 September 2012	(Kazakhstan) Almaty	Sunkar HS140	LH	(Slovenia) Jurij Tepeš	(Norway) Anders Fannemel	(Norway) Tom Hilde	(Germany) Andreas Wank	
134	7	23 September 2012	(Kazakhstan) Almaty	Sunkar HS140	LH	(Japan) Taku Takeuchi	(Slovenia) Jurij Tepeš	(Norway) Anders Bardal	(Germany) Andreas Wank	
135	8	30 September 2012	(Austria) Hinzenbach	Aigner-Schanze HS94	NH	(Poland) Maciej Kot	(Germany) Severin Freund	(Japan) Taku Takeuchi	(Germany) Andreas Wank	
136	9	3 October 2012	(Germany) Klingenthal	Vogtland Arena HS140	LH	(Germany) Severin Freund	(Japan) Taku Takeuchi	(Austria) Thomas Morgenstern	(Germany) Andreas Wank	

=== Ladies ===
Num	Season	Date	Place	Hill	Size	Winner	Second	Third	Yellow bib	Ref.
1	1	15 August 2012	(France) Courchevel	Tremplin du Praz HS96	NH	(Canada) Alexandra Pretorius	(Austria) Daniela Iraschko	(Austria) Jacqueline Seifriedsberger	(Canada) Alexandra Pretorius	
2	2	17 August 2012	(Germany) Hinterzarten	Rothaus-Schanze HS108 (night)	NH	(Austria) Daniela Iraschko	(Japan) Sara Takanashi	(Germany) Carina Vogt	(Austria) Daniela Iraschko-Stolz	
3	3	22 September 2012	(Kazakhstan) Almaty	Sunkar HS106	NH	(Japan) Sara Takanashi	(Slovenia) Katja Požun	(Canada) Alexandra Pretorius	(Japan) Sara Takanashi	
4	4	23 September 2012	(Kazakhstan) Almaty	Sunkar HS106	NH	(Japan) Sara Takanashi	(Russia) Irina Avvakumova	(Canada) Alexandra Pretorius	(Japan) Sara Takanashi	

=== Mixed ===
Num	Season	Date	Place	Hill	Size	Winner	Second	Third	Yellow bib	Ref.
1	1	14 August 2012	(France) Courchevel	Tremplin du Praz HS96	NH	Japan Yūki Itō; Sara Takanashi; Noriaki Kasai; Yuta Watase	Germany Katharina Althaus; Ulrike Gräßler; Pascal Bodmer; Andreas Wank	Austria Jacqueline Seifriedsberger; Daniela Iraschko; David Zauner; Michael Hayböck	Germany	
2	2	18 August 2012	(Germany) Hinterzarten	Rothaus-Schanze HS108 (night)	NH	Austria Jacqueline Seifriedsberger; Daniela Iraschko; Michael Hayböck; Gregor Schlierenzauer	Japan Sara Takanashi; Kaori Iwabuchi; Reruhi Shimizu; Yuta Watase	Germany Ulrike Gräßler; Carina Vogt; Richard Freitag; Andreas Wank	Germany	

=== Men's team ===
Num	Season	Date	Place	Hill	Size	Winner	Second	Third	Yellow bib	Ref.
16	1	20 July 2012	(Poland) Wisła	Malinka HS134 (night)	LH	Slovenia Jurij Tepeš; Robert Hrgota; Peter Prevc; Robert Kranjec	(Poland) Poland Piotr Żyła; Kamil Stoch; Dawid Kubacki; Maciej Kot	Germany Andreas Wank; Maximilian Mechler; Michael Neumayer; Richard Freitag	Slovenia	

== Men's standings ==
=== Overall ===
Rank	after 9 events	Points
1	(Germany) Andreas Wank	449
2	(Slovenia) Jurij Tepeš	378
3	(Japan) Taku Takeuchi	352
4	(Japan) Reruhi Shimizu	327
5	(Poland) Maciej Kot	310

=== Nations Cup ===
Rank	after 12 events	Points
1	Japan	1832
2	Germany	1717
3	Slovenia	1404
4	Poland	1172
5	Norway	1026

== Ladies' standings ==
=== Overall ===
Rank	after 4 events	Points
1	(Japan) Sara Takanashi	312
2	(Canada) Alexandra Pretorius	249
3	(Austria) Daniela Iraschko	180
4	(Germany) Carina Vogt	154
5	(Russia) Irina Avvakumova	148

=== Nations Cup ===
Rank	after 6 events	Points
1	Japan	1057
2	Germany	705
3	Austria	640
4	Canada	494
5	United States	442

== See also ==
- Poland at the 2012 FIS Ski Jumping Grand Prix
