= Daria Grushina =

Russian ski jumper (born 1998)

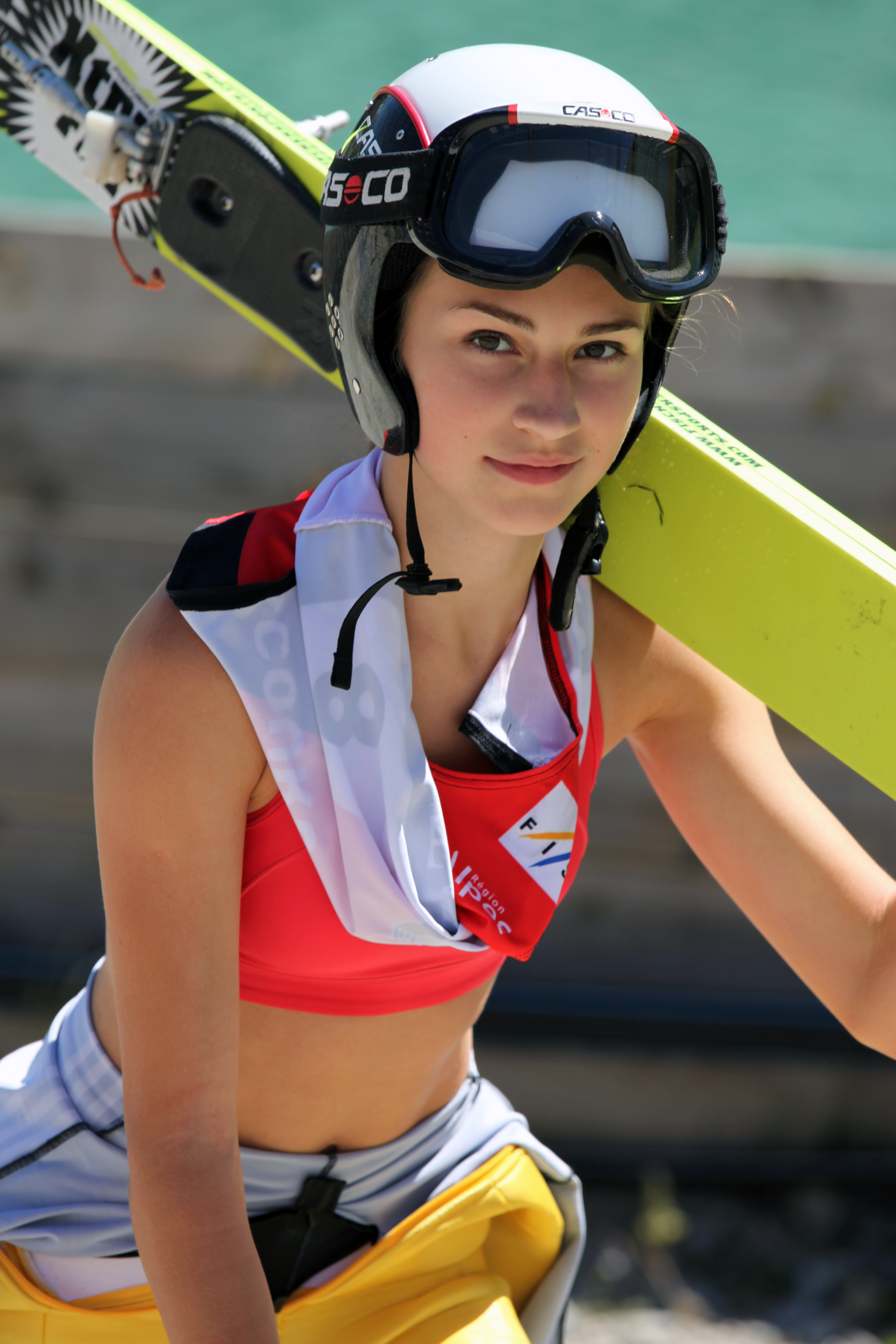

Personal information
- Full name: Дарья Грушина
- Born: 26 March 1998 (age 28) Saint Petersburg, Russia

Sport
- Sport: Skiing

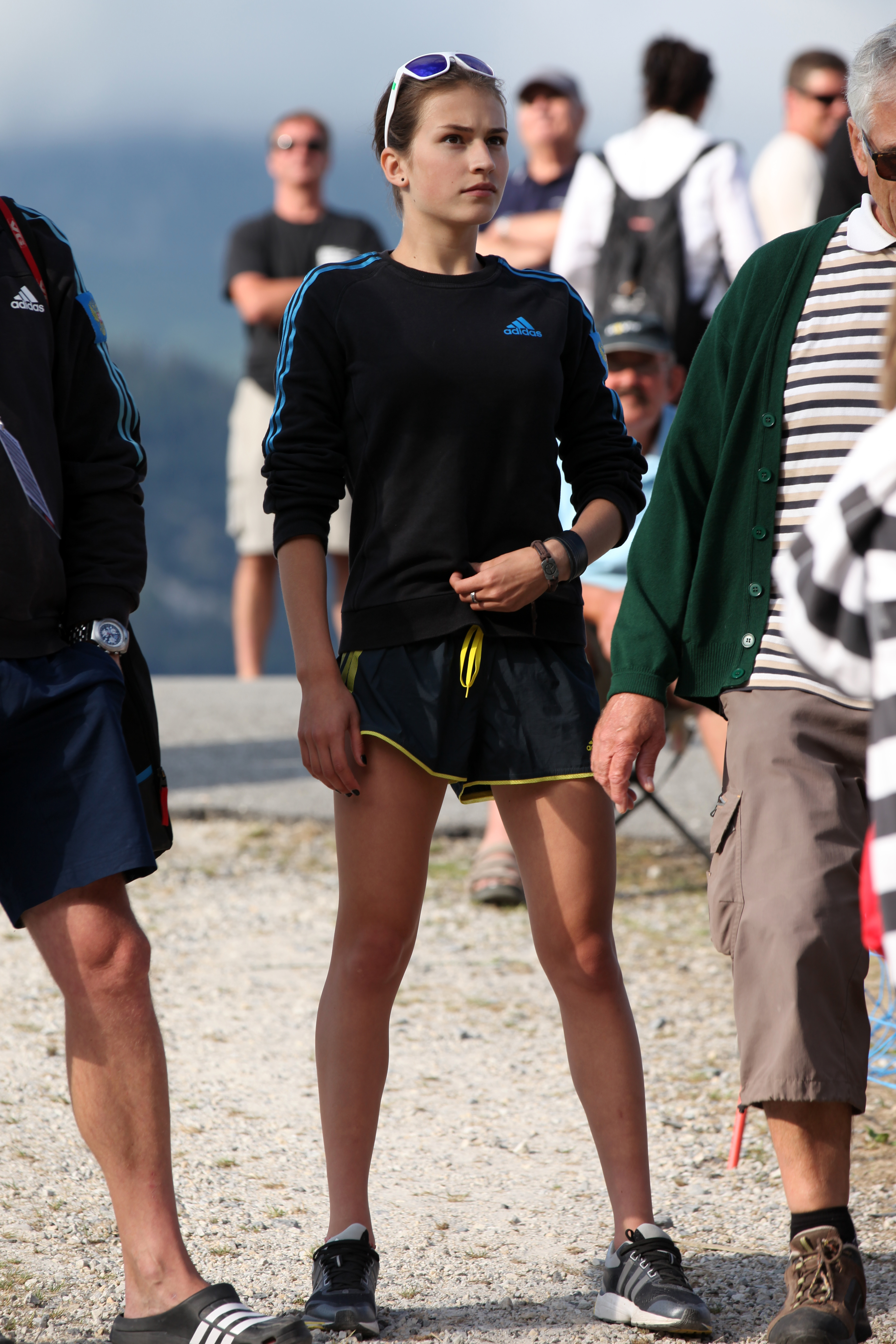
Daria Grushina at the Summer Grand Prix in Courchevel, 2013.

Daria Grushina, russ.: Дарья Грушина, born 26 March 1998 in Saint Petersburg, is a Russian ski jumper, member of the National Team and the 2013 vice National Champion.

== Sports career ==
Since 2013, Grushina has taken part in international FIS competitions. At the Junior World Championships in Liberec (24 and 26 January 2013) Grushina placed 31st and 6th in the individual and the team ranking respectively. A week before, at the FIS Cup in Rasnov (19 and 20 January 2013) Grushina placed 4th and 2nd. In the Continental Cup, Grushina could gain points as well: in Örnsköldsvik (9 and 10 March 2013), she placed 12nd and 14th.

Despite her young age, in 2013, Grushina also started to take part in FIS elite competitions, i.e. the Summer Grand Prix events in Hinterzarten (26 July 2013) and Courchevel (15 August 2013). Aged barely 15, as the third youngest participant, in Courchevel Grushina could beat two Italian professional jumpers, Lisa Demetz and Evelyn Insam, and her older Russian teammates Anastasia Gladysheva and Stefaniya Nadymova. The Courchevel winner was Ema Klinec, the competition's second youngest participant.

According to the official FIS CUP standings, Grushina was on the 6th position (of 31) in «2013» and the 18th position (of 32) in «2014». In the Continental Cup Standings, Grushina she was ranked 14 (of 35).

Grushina attends an elite sports school in Saint-Petersburg and is a member of the Junior National Team. On 7 December 2012, Grushina had the honour of inaugurating the Olympic K95 ski jump in Sochi.

Before entering the FIS platform, Grushina took part in international competitions as well. For example, on 5 February 2012, she won the Carinthian Cup in Villach.
