= Aleksander Zniszczoł =

Polish ski jumper (born 1994)

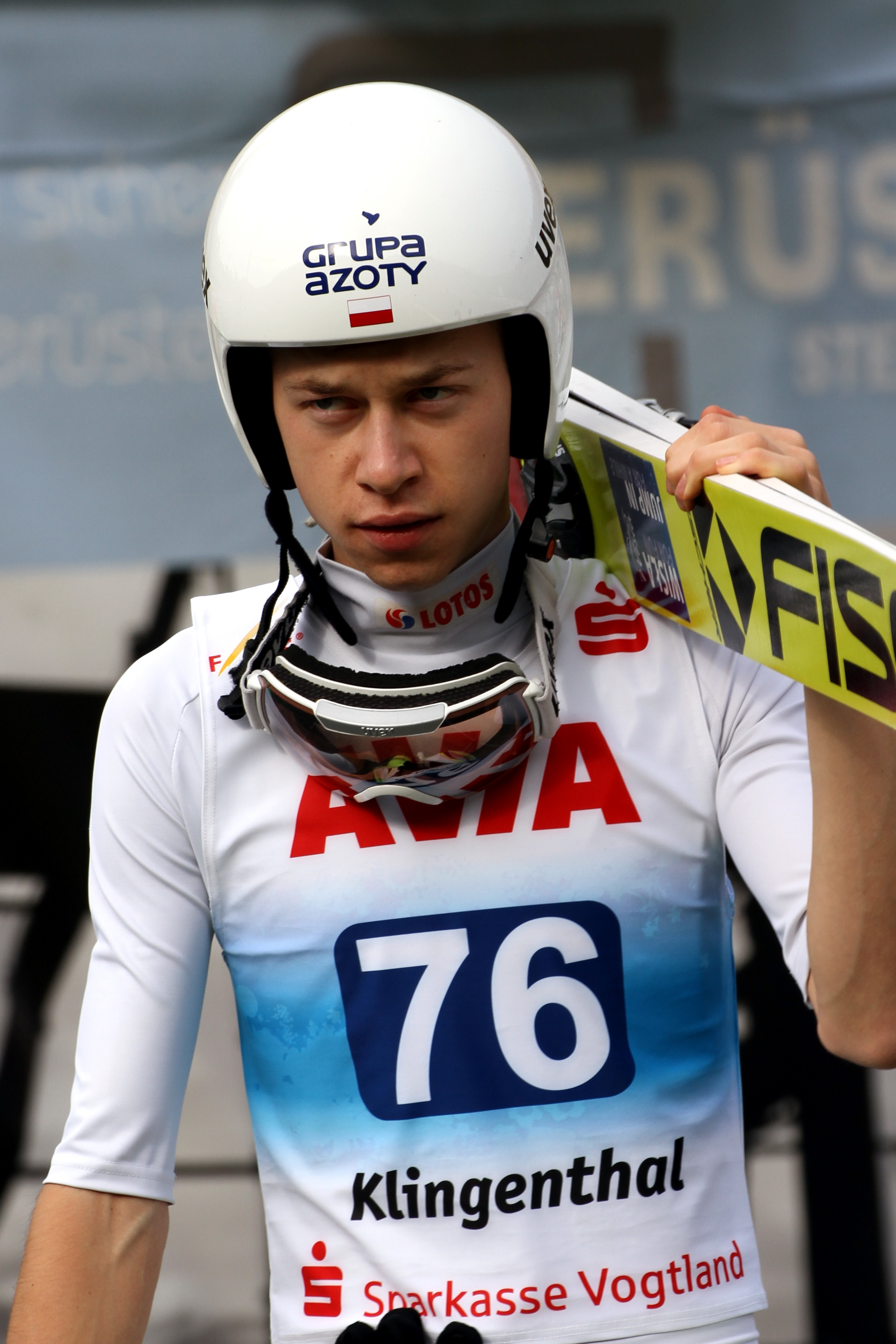

Personal information
- Full name: Aleksander Zniszczoł
- Nationality: Poland
- Born: March 8, 1994 (age 32) Cieszyn, Poland
- Height: 1.79 m (5 ft 10 in)

Sport
- Sport: Skiing
- Club: KS Wisła Ustronianka

World Cup career
- Seasons: 2007–present
- Indiv. starts: 58
- Team podiums: 1

Achievements and titles
- Personal bests: 243 m (797 ft); Vikersund, 17 March 2025
Medal record
Representing Poland
Winter Universiade
Gold medal – first place	2013 Trentino	Team NH
World Junior Championship
Gold medal – first place	2014 Val di Fiemme	Team NH
Silver medal – second place	2013 Liberec	Team NH
Silver medal – second place	2012 Erzurum	Team NH
Silver medal – second place	2012 Erzurum	Individual NH
- Updated on 12 December 2020

Aleksander Zniszczoł (born 8 March 1994) is a Polish ski jumper, a member of the Polish national ski jumping team and a 2014 Junior World Champion in the team competition.

== Personal life ==
Zniszczoł is studying at the University School of Physical Education in Katowice. On 28 May 2017, he married Magdalena Lazar. On 6 April 2018, his wife gave birth to their daughter.

== Career ==
In the season 2006/2007, he won the general classification Lotos Cup and the next season he was third. On 24 July 2010, he won the silver medal of the Polish Championships with his club Wisla Ustronianka. On 30 July 2010, he debuted in Continental Cup in Courchevel, France placing 46th. On 20 January 2012, he debuted in the World Cup in Zakopane, Poland and was 9th after jumping on distance – 124.5 m and 123 m. On 3 March 2012, he placed third in the World Cup in Lahti, Finland in team competition with Maciej Kot, Kamil Stoch and Klemens Murańka. He is a three-time silver medalist of World Junior Championship from Liberec and Erzurum (twice with team and once individual) and gold medalist in team competition of World Junior Championship from Val di Fiemme 2014 with Jakub Wolny, Klemens Murańka and Krzysztof Biegun. On 9 January 2015, during the training he set a new personal record of 213.5 metres, in Bad Mittendorf.

== World championships ==
=== Individual ===
2015 (Sweden) Falun	–	40th place (K-120)

=== Aleksander Zniszczoł's starts at World Championships ===
Place	Day	Year	Locality	Hill	Point K	HS	Competition	Jump 1	Jump 2	Note (points)	Loss (points)	Winner
40.	26 February	2015	(Sweden) Falun	Lugnet	K-120	HS-134	individual	110.0 m	—	80.6	188.1	Severin Freund

== World Cup ==
=== Season standings ===
Season	Overall	Ski-Flying	Four Hills Tournament	Raw Air	Willingen Five	Titisee-Neustadt Five
2011–12	47	37	61	–	–	–
2012–13	68	–	–	–	–	–
2013–14	NQ	–	–	–	–	–
2014–15	48	36	37	–	–	–
2015–16	–	–	–	–	–	–
2016–17	62	–	–	–	–	–
2017–18	NQ	–	–	–	–	–
2018–19	NQ	–	51	–	–	–
2019–20	51	–	–	59	38	39
2020–21	40	–	31	–	–	–
2021–22	66	42	–	–	–	–
2022–23	32	20	–	24	–	–
2023–24	19	9	–	9	–	–
2024–25	19	36	–	–	–	–
2025–26	–	–	–	–	–	–

=== Individual starts ===
Season	1	2	3	4	5	6	7	8	9	10	11	12	13	14	15	16	17	18	19	20	21	22	23	24	25	26	27	28	29	30	31	Points
2011/12	Kuusamo	Lillehammer	Lillehammer	Harrachov	Harrachov	Engelberg	Engelberg	Oberstdorf	Garmisch-Partenkirchen	Innsbruck	Bischofshofen	Bad Mitterndorf	Bad Mitterndorf	Zakopane	Zakopane	Sapporo	Sapporo	Predazzo	Predazzo	Willingen	Oberstdorf	Lahti	Trondheim	Oslo	Planica	Planica						60
2011/12	–	–	–	–	–	–	–	48	48	q	–	–	–	9	14	–	–	–	–	–	–	q	41	q	18	–						60
2012/13	Lillehammer	Lillehammer	Kuusamo	Krasnaja Polana	Krasnaja Polana	Engelberg	Engelberg	Oberstdorf	Garmisch-Partenkirchen	Innsbruck	Bischofshofen	Wisła	Zakopane	Sapporo	Sapporo	Vikersund	Vikersund	Harrachov	Harrachov	Klingenthal	Oberstdorf	Lahti	Kuopio	Trondheim	Oslo	Planica	Planica					8
2012/13	–	–	–	–	–	–	–	–	–	–	–	35	23	–	–	–	–	–	–	–	q	–	–	–	–	–	–					8
2013/14	Klingenthal	Kuusamo	Lillehammer	Lillehammer	Titisee-Neustadt	Titisee-Neustadt	Engelberg	Engelberg	Oberstdorf	Garmisch-Partenkirchen	Innsbruck	Bischofshofen	Tauplitz	Tauplitz	Wisła	Zakopane	Sapporo	Sapporo	Willingen	Willingen	Falun	Lahti	Lahti	Kuopio	Trondheim	Oslo	Planica	Planica				0
2013/14	–	–	–	–	–	–	–	–	–	–	–	–	–	–	40	40	–	–	–	–	–	–	–	–	–	–	–	–				0
2014/15	Klingenthal	Kuusamo	Kuusamo	Lillehammer	Lillehammer	Nizhny Tagil	Nizhny Tagil	Engelberg	Engelberg	Oberstdorf	Garmisch-Partenkirchen	Innsbruck	Bischofshofen	Tauplitz	Wisła	Zakopane	Sapporo	Sapporo	Willingen	Willingen	Titisee-Neustadt	Titisee-Neustadt	Vikersund	Vikersund	Lahti	Kuopio	Trondheim	Oslo	Oslo	Planica	Planica	75
2014/15	–	40	44	29	28	–	–	q	q	32	41	28	50	27	21	31	19	30	15	43	22	29	32	18	–	–	–	–	–	–	–	75
2015/16	Klingenthal	Lillehammer	Lillehammer	Nizhny Tagil	Nizhny Tagil	Engelberg	Engelberg	Oberstdorf	Garmisch-Partenkirchen	Innsbruck	Bischofshofen	Willingen	Zakopane	Sapporo	Sapporo	Trondheim	Vikersund	Vikersund	Vikersund	Lahti	Lahti	Kuopio	Almaty	Almaty	Wisła	Titisee-Neustadt	Planica	Planica	Planica			0
2015/16	–	–	–	–	–	–	–	–	–	–	–	–	–	–	–	–	–	–	–	–	–	–	–	–	q	–	–	–	–			0
2016/17	Kuusamo	Kuusamo	Klingenthal	Lillehammer	Lillehammer	Engelberg	Engelberg	Oberstdorf	Garmisch-Partenkirchen	Innsbruck	Bischofshofen	Wisła	Wisła	Zakopane	Willingen	Oberstdorf	Oberstdorf	Sapporo	Sapporo	Pyeongchang	Pyeongchang	Oslo	Trondheim	Vikersund	Planica	Planica						9
2016/17	41	33	q	31	22	32	46	–	–	–	–	–	–	–	–	–	–	–	–	–	–	–	–	–	–	–						9
2017/18	Wisła	Kuusamo	Nizhny Tagil	Nizhny Tagil	Titisee-Neustadt	Engelberg	Engelberg	Oberstdorf	Garmisch-Partenkirchen	Innsbruck	Bischofshofen	Tauplitz	Tauplitz	Zakopane	Willingen	Willingen	Lahti	Oslo	Lillehammer	Trondheim	Vikersund	Planica	Planica									0
2017/18	38	–	–	–	–	–	–	–	–	–	–	–	–	–	–	–	42	–	–	–	–	–	–	–	–	–						0
2018/19	Wisła	Kuusamo	Kuusamo	Nizhny Tagil	Nizhny Tagil	Engelberg	Engelberg	Oberstdorf	Garmisch-Partenkirchen	Innsbruck	Bischofshofen	Predazzo	Predazzo	Zakopane	Sapporo	Sapporo	Oberstdorf	Oberstdorf	Oberstdorf	Lahti	Willingen	Willingen	Oslo	Lillehammer	Trondheim	Vikersund	Planica	Planica				0
2018/19	q	–	–	–	–	–	–	42	44	q	q	–	–	45	–	–	–	–	–	–	–	–	–	–	–	–	–	–				0
2019/20	Wisła HS134	Kuusamo HS142	Nizhny Tagil HS134	Nizhny Tagil HS134	Klingenthal HS140	Engelberg HS140	Engelberg HS140	Oberstdorf HS137	Garmisch-Partenkirchen HS142	Innsbruck HS130	Bischofshofen HS142	Predazzo HS104	Predazzo HS104	Titisee-Neustadt HS142	Titisee-Neustadt HS142	Zakopane HS140	Sapporo HS137	Sapporo HS137	Willingen HS145	Tauplitz HS235	Tauplitz HS235	Râșnov HS97	Râșnov HS97	Lahti HS130	Lahti HS130	Lillehammer HS140	Lillehammer HS140					18
2019/20	44	—	—	—	—	—	—	—	—	—	—	—	—	34	41	35	41	40	37	30	28	24	24	48	50	q	q					18
2020/21	Wisła HS134	Kuusamo HS142	Kuusamo HS142	Nizhny Tagil HS134	Nizhny Tagil HS134	Engelberg HS140	Engelberg HS140	Oberstdorf HS137	Garmisch-Partenkirchen HS142	Innsbruck HS130	Bischofshofen HS142	Titisee-Neustadt HS142	Titisee-Neustadt HS142	Zakopane HS140	Lahti HS130	Willingen HS145	Willingen HS145	TBD	TBD	TBD	TBD	Râșnov HS97	Oslo HS134	Lillehammer HS140	Trondheim HS138	Vikersund HS240	Planica HS240	Planica HS240				81
2020/21	35	–	–	6	19	25	48	45	35	19	25	36	28	–	29	34	40	–	–	–	–	–										81
2021/22	Nizhny Tagil HS134	Nizhny Tagil HS134	Kuusamo HS142	Kuusamo HS142	Wisła HS134	Klingenthal HS140	Klingenthal HS140	Engelberg HS140	Engelberg HS140	Oberstdorf HS137	Garmisch-Partenkirchen HS142	Innsbruck HS130	Bischofshofen HS142	Bischofshofen HS142	Zakopane HS140	Sapporo HS137	Sapporo HS137	Sapporo HS137	Titisee-Neustadt HS142	Titisee-Neustadt HS142	Willingen HS145	Willingen HS145	Lahti HS130	Lahti HS130	Lillehammer HS140	Oslo HS134	Oslo HS134	Oberstdorf HS137	Oberstdorf HS137	Planica HS240	Planica HS240			8
2021/22	—	—	37	42	26	37	42	–	–	–	–	–	–	–	48	—	—	—	48	43	–	–	–	–	–	–	–	32	28	—	—			8
2022/23	Wisła HS134	Wisła HS134	Kuusamo HS142	Kuusamo HS142	Titisee-Neustadt HS142	Titisee-Neustadt HS142	Engelberg HS140	Engelberg HS140	Oberstdorf HS137	Garmisch-Partenkirchen HS142	Innsbruck HS130	Bischofshofen HS142	Zakopane HS140	Sapporo HS137	Sapporo HS137	Sapporo HS137	Bad Mittendorf HS235	Bad Mittendorf HS235	Willingen HS145	Lake Placid HS128	Lake Placid HS128	Râșnov HS97	Oslo HS134	Oslo HS134	Lillehammer HS140	Lillehammer HS140	Vikersund HS240	Vikersund HS240	Lahti HS130	Planica HS240	Planica HS240			181
2022/23	31	45	35	40	29	45	46	37	–	–	–	–	27	25	17	19	20	27	13	21	–	31	q	26	17	20	18	21	14	14	17			181
2023/24	Kuusamo HS142	Kuusamo HS142	Lillehammer HS140	Lillehammer HS140	Klingenthal HS140	Klingenthal HS140	Engelberg HS140	Engelberg HS140	Oberstdorf HS137	Garmisch-Partenkirchen HS142	Innsbruck HS130	Bischofshofen HS142	Wisła HS134	Szczyrk HS137	Zakopane HS104	Willingen HS145	Willingen HS145	Lake Placid HS128	Lake Placid HS128	Sapporo HS137	Sapporo HS137	Oberstdorf HS137	Oberstdorf HS137	Lahti HS130	Lahti HS130	Oslo HS134	Oslo HS134	Trondheim HS105/138	Trondheim HS105/138	Vikersund HS240	Vikersund HS240	Planica HS240	Planica HS240	524
2023/24	32	q	41	33	–	–	–	–	37	21	16	20	21	—	11	8	8	6	9	25	14	19	23	8	3	41	10	22	18	10	7	14	3	524
