= Krzysztof Biegun =

Polish ski jumper

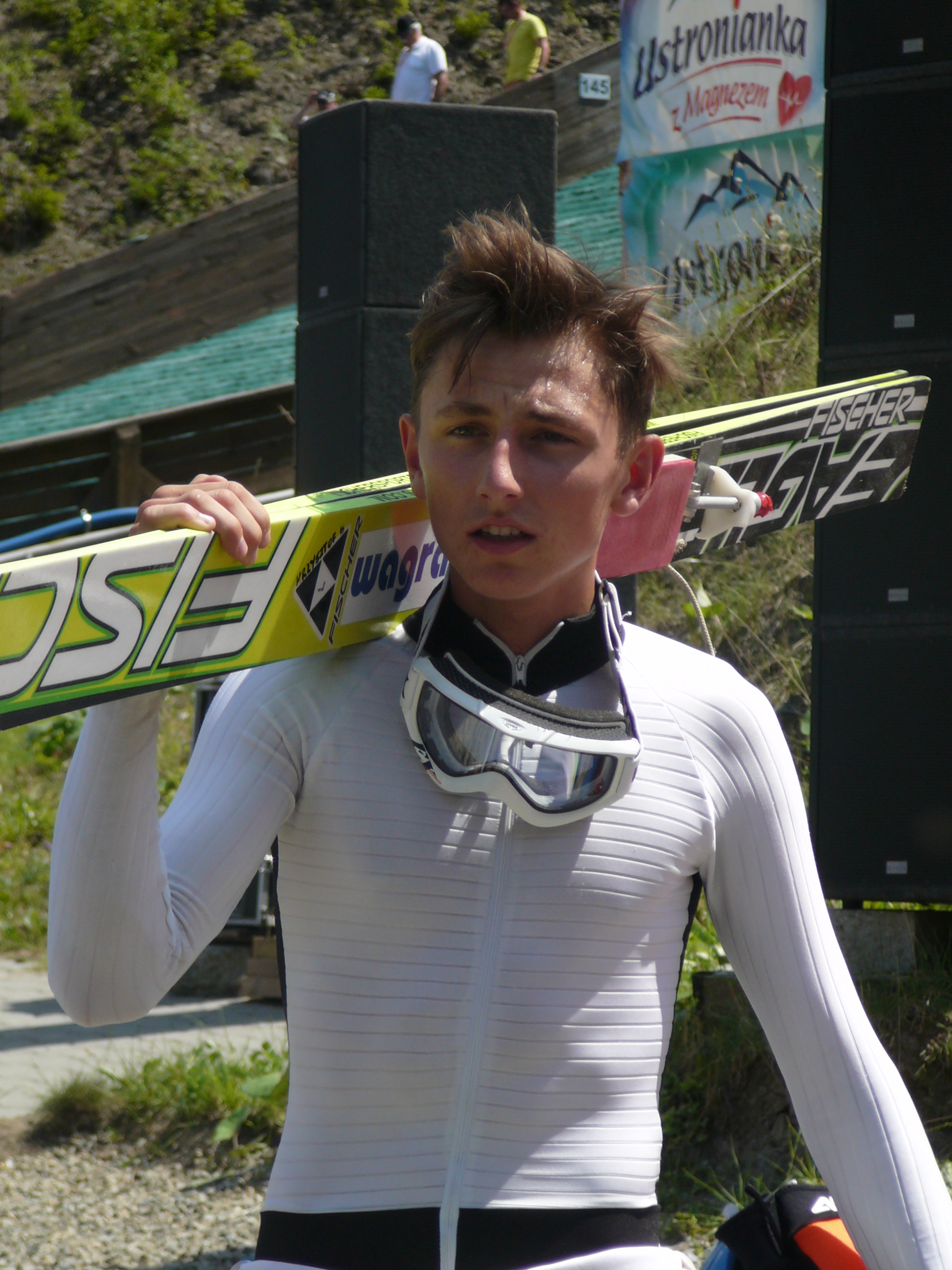

Personal information
- Full name: Krzysztof Biegun
- Nationality: Poland
- Born: 21 May 1994 (age 32) Gilowice, Poland
- Height: 1.70 m (5 ft 7 in)

Sport
- Sport: Skiing
- Club: LKS Sokół Szczyrk

World Cup career
- Seasons: 2013–2018
- Indiv. starts: 13
- Indiv. podiums: 1
- Indiv. wins: 1
- Team starts: 2

Achievements and titles
- Personal bests: 197.5 m (648 ft); Oberstdorf, 17 February 2013
Medal record
Men's ski jumping
World Junior Championship
Gold medal – first place	2014 Val di Fiemme	Team NH
- Updated on 17 March 2019

Krzysztof Biegun (born 21 May 1994) is a Polish ski jumper.

== Career ==
Biegun's debut in FIS Ski Jumping World Cup took place in February 2013 in Oberstdorf. On 24 November 2013, he won the event in Klingenthal at large hill. At the 2013 Winter Universiade he took the silver medal in the normal hill event and gold medals in both the large hill and large hill team events.

== World Cup ==
=== Season standings ===
Season	Overall	Ski-Flying	Four Hills Tournament
2012–13	81	58	–
2013–14	35	–	35
2014–15	–	–	–

=== Individual victories ===
No.	Season	Date	Location	Hill	Size
1	2013/14	24 November 2013	(Germany) Klingenthal	Vogtlandarena HS140	LH

=== Individual starts ===
Season	1	2	3	4	5	6	7	8	9	10	11	12	13	14	15	16	17	18	19	20	21	22	23	24	25	26	27	28	29	30	31	Points
2012/13	Lillehammer	Lillehammer	Kuusamo	Krasnaja Polana	Krasnaja Polana	Engelberg	Engelberg	Oberstdorf	Garmisch-Partenkirchen	Innsbruck	Bischofshofen	Wisła	Zakopane	Sapporo	Sapporo	Vikersund	Vikersund	Harrachov	Harrachov	Klingenthal	Oberstdorf	Lahti	Kuopio	Trondheim	Oslo	Planica	Planica					1
2012/13	–	–	–	–	–	–	–	–	–	–	–	–	–	–	–	–	–	–	–	–	30	–	–	–	–	–	–					1
2013/14	Klingenthal	Kuusamo	Lillehammer	Lillehammer	Titisee-Neustadt	Titisee-Neustadt	Engelberg	Engelberg	Oberstdorf	Garmisch-Partenkirchen	Innsbruck	Bischofshofen	Tauplitz	Tauplitz	Wisła	Zakopane	Sapporo	Sapporo	Willingen	Willingen	Falun	Lahti	Lahti	Kuopio	Trondheim	Oslo	Planica	Planica				144
2013/14	1	18	32	36	–	–	–	–	27	31	q	–	–	–	20	15	–	–	–	–	–	–	–	–	–	–	–	–				144
2014/15	Klingenthal	Kuusamo	Kuusamo	Lillehammer	Lillehammer	Nizhny Tagil	Nizhny Tagil	Engelberg	Engelberg	Oberstdorf	Garmisch-Partenkirchen	Innsbruck	Bischofshofen	Tauplitz	Wisła	Zakopane	Sapporo	Sapporo	Willingen	Willingen	Titisee-Neustadt	Titisee-Neustadt	Vikersund	Vikersund	Lahti	Kuopio	Trondheim	Oslo	Oslo	Planica	Planica	0
2014/15	–	43	45	–	–	–	–	–	–	–	–	q	q	–	–	–	–	–	–	–	–	–	q	33	–	–	–	–	–	–	–	0
2015/16	Klingenthal	Lillehammer	Lillehammer	Nizhny Tagil	Nizhny Tagil	Engelberg	Engelberg	Oberstdorf	Garmisch-Partenkirchen	Innsbruck	Bischofshofen	Willingen	Zakopane	Sapporo	Sapporo	Trondheim	Vikersund	Vikersund	Vikersund	Lahti	Lahti	Kuopio	Almaty	Almaty	Wisła	Titisee-Neustadt	Titisee-Neustadt	Planica	Planica			0
2015/16	–	–	–	–	–	–	–	–	–	–	–	–	39	–	–	–	–	–	–	–	–	–	–	–	q	–	–	–	–			0
