= 2010–11 FIS Ski Jumping Continental Cup =

Ski-jumping competition series

FIS Ski Jumping Continental Cup 2010/11
Discipline	Men	Women
Summer	(Poland) Kamil Stoch	(Austria) Daniela Iraschko
Winter	(Slovenia) Rok Zima	(Austria) Daniela Iraschko

Competition
Edition	9th (Summer), 20th (Winter)	3rd (Summer), 7th (Winter)
Locations	8 (Summer), 14 (Winter)	6 (Summer), 10 (Winter)
Individual	15 (Summer), 29 (Winter)	11 (Summer), 20 (Winter)
Cancelled	— (Summer), — (Winter)	— (Summer), 3 (Winter)
Rescheduled	2 (Summer), — (Winter)	— (Summer), 1 (Winter)

The 2010/11 FIS Ski Jumping Continental Cup was the 20th in a row (18th official) Continental Cup winter season and the 9th official summer season in ski jumping for men.

This was also the 7th winter and the 3rd summer season for women. FIS Ladies Winter Tournament win went to Coline Mattel.

Other competitions this season were World Cup and Grand Prix.

== Men's Summer ==
Individual men's events in the CC history

Total	F	L	N	Winners
95	—	38	57

after large hill event in Wisla (3 October 2010)

=== Calendar ===
All	No.	Date	Place (Hill)	Size	Winner	Second	Third	Overall leader	R.
81	1	2 July 2010	(Slovenia) Kranj (Bauhenk HS109)	N _{052}	(Austria) Andreas Strolz	(Poland) Kamil Stoch	(Poland) Dawid Kubacki	(Austria) Andreas Strolz	
82	2	3 July 2010	(Slovenia) Kranj (Bauhenk HS109)	N _{053}	(Poland) Kamil Stoch	(Poland) Krzysztof Mietus	(Austria) Andreas Strolz	(Poland) Kamil Stoch	
83	3	4 July 2010	(Slovenia) Velenje (Grajski grič HS94)	N _{054}	(Poland) Kamil Stoch	(Poland) Stefan Hula	(Austria) David Unterberger	(Poland) Kamil Stoch	
84	4	(Note: Men competition from Garmisch-Partenkirchen (9 July) had only one round.)9 July 2010	(Germany) Garmisch-Pa (Gr. Olympiaschanze HS140)	L _{030}	(Poland) Kamil Stoch	(Poland) Stefan Hula	(Austria) Andreas Strolz	(Poland) Kamil Stoch	
85	5	10 July 2010	(Germany) Garmisch-Pa (Gr. Olympiaschanze HS140)	L _{031}	(Poland) Kamil Stoch	(Austria) Andreas Strolz	(Poland) Dawid Kubacki	(Poland) Kamil Stoch	
86	6	(Note: Cancelled men's competition from Courchevel (31 July) was rescheduled to 30 July.)30 July 2010	(France) Courchevel (Tremplin du Praz HS132)	L _{032}	(Czech Republic) Jakub Janda	(Czech Republic) Antonin Hajek	(Germany) Danny Queck	(Poland) Kamil Stoch	
		31 July 2010	(France) Courchevel (Tremplin du Praz HS132)	L _{cnx}	cancelled and rescheduled to 30 July			—	
87	7	(Note: Cancelled men's competition from Courchevel (1 August) was rescheduled to 31 July.)31 July 2010	(France) Courchevel (Tremplin du Praz HS132)	L _{033}	(Czech Republic) Jakub Janda	(Czech Republic) Antonin Hajek	(Slovenia) Rok Zima	(Poland) Kamil Stoch	
		1 August 2010	(France) Courchevel (Tremplin du Praz HS132)	L _{cnx}	cancelled and rescheduled to 31 July			—	
88	8	11 September 2010	(Norway) Lillehammer (Lysgårdsbakken HS138	L _{034}	(France) Emmanuel Chedal	(Poland) Rafał Śliż	(France) V. D.-Sevoie	(Poland) Kamil Stoch	
89	9	12 September 2010	(Norway) Lillehammer (Lysgårdsbakken HS138	L _{035}	(Slovenia) Rok Zima	(France) V. D.-Sevoie	(Czech Republic) Jakub Janda	(Poland) Kamil Stoch	
90	10	18 September 2010	(Norway) Oslo (Midtstubakken HS106)	N _{055}	(Poland) Rafał Śliż	(Austria) Thomas Diethart	(Czech Republic) Lukas Hlava	(Poland) Kamil Stoch	
91	11	(Note: Men's competition from Oslo (19 September) had only one round.)19 September 2010	(Norway) Oslo (Midtstubakken HS106)	N _{056}	(Norway) B. Einar Romøren	(Austria) Michael Hayböck	(Slovenia) Jure Šinkovec	(Poland) Kamil Stoch	
92	12	(Note: Men's normal hill HS105 competition Almaty (originally scheduled on 25 September) was switched with large hill HS140 event.)25 September 2010	(Kazakhstan) Almaty (Gorney Gigant HS140/105)	L _{036}	(Poland) Kamil Stoch	(Czech Republic) Jakub Janda (Bulgaria) Vladimir Zografski		(Poland) Kamil Stoch	
93	13	(Note: Men's large hill HS140 competition Almaty (originally scheduled on 26 September) was switched with normal hill HS105 event.)26 September 2010	(Kazakhstan) Almaty (Gorney Gigant HS140/105)	N _{057}	(Poland) Kamil Stoch	(Bulgaria) Vladimir Zografski	(Poland) Łukasz Rutkowski (Poland) Tomasz Byrt	(Poland) Kamil Stoch	
94	14	2 October 2010	(Poland) Wisła (Malinka HS134)	L _{037}	(Norway) Anders Fannemel	(Poland) Stefan Hula	(Slovenia) Robert Hrgota	(Poland) Kamil Stoch	
95	15	3 October 2010	(Poland) Wisła (Malinka HS134)	L _{038}	(Norway) Anders Fannemel	(Slovenia) Jure Šinkovec	(Finland) Anssi Koivuranta	(Poland) Kamil Stoch	
9th FIS Summer Continental Cup Men's Overall (2 July – 3 October 2010)					(Poland) Kamil Stoch	(Czech Republic) Jakub Janda	(Austria) Andreas Strolz	Summer Overall	

==== Overall ====
Rank	after 15 events	Points
1	(Poland) Kamil Stoch	680
2	(Czech Republic) Jakub Janda	484
3	(Austria) Andreas Strolz	396
4	(Poland) Stefan Hula	364
5	(Bulgaria) Vladimir Zografski	323
6	(Czech Republic) Antonín Hájek	283
7	(France) Emmanuel Chedal	250
8	(Slovenia) Rok Zima	244
9	(Poland) Marcin Bachleda	230
10	(Germany) Danny Queck	229

== Men's Winter ==
Individual men's events in the CC history

Total	F	L	N	Winners
694	4	322	368

after large hill event in Wisla (12 March 2011)

=== Calendar ===
All	No.	Date	Place (Hill)	Size	Winner	Second	Third	Overall leader	R.
666	1	7 December 2010	(Finland) Rovaniemi (Ounasvaara HS100)	N _{363}	(Germany) Stephan Hocke	(Germany) Andreas Wank	(Germany) Julian Musiol (Norway) O. Marius Ingvaldsen	(Germany) Stephan Hocke	
667	2	8 December 2010	(Finland) Rovaniemi (Ounasvaara HS100)	N _{364}	(Germany) Stephan Hocke	(Finland) Anssi Koivuranta	(Germany) Richard Freitag	(Germany) Stephan Hocke	
668	3	10 December 2010	(Norway) Vikersund (Vikersundbakken HS117)	L _{300}	(Norway) K. R. Elverum Sorsell	(Finland) Anssi Koivuranta	(Germany) Stephan Hocke	(Germany) Stephan Hocke	
669	4	11 December 2010	(Norway) Vikersund (Vikersundbakken HS117)	L _{301}	(Germany) Stephan Hocke	(Germany) Richard Freitag	(Norway) K. R. Elverum Sorsell	(Germany) Stephan Hocke	
670	5	18 December 2010	(Turkey) Erzurum (Kiremitliktepe HS109)	N _{365}	(Finland) Anssi Koivuranta (Austria) Stefan Thurnbichler		(Norway) K. R. Elverum Sorsell	(Germany) Stephan Hocke	
671	6	19 December 2010	(Turkey) Erzurum (Kiremitliktepe HS109)	N _{366}	(Austria) Stefan Thurnbichler	(Austria) Mario Innauer	(Norway) K. R. Elverum Sorsell	(Germany) Stephan Hocke	
672	7	27 December 2010	(Switzerland) Engelberg (Gross-Titlis HS137)	L _{302}	(Finland) Olli Muotka	(Austria) Mario Innauer	(Switzerland) Marco Grigoli	(Germany) Stephan Hocke	
673	8	28 December 2010	(Switzerland) Engelberg (Gross-Titlis HS137)	L _{303}	(Austria) Mario Innauer	(Slovenia) Matic Kramaršič	(Finland) Olli Muotka (Austria) Thomas Diethart	(Germany) Stephan Hocke	
674	9	7 January 2011	(Japan) Sapporo (Ōkurayama HS134)	L _{304}	(Slovenia) Mitja Mežnar	(Japan) Kazuyoshi Funaki	(Slovenia) Matic Kramaršič	(Germany) Stephan Hocke	
675	10	8 January 2011	(Japan) Sapporo (Ōkurayama HS134)	L _{305}	(Slovenia) Mitja Mežnar	(Slovenia) Matjaž Pungertar	(Slovenia) Jernej Damjan	(Germany) Stephan Hocke	
676	11	9 January 2011	(Japan) Sapporo (Ōkurayama HS134)	L _{306}	(Slovenia) Jernej Damjan	(United States) Peter Frenette	(Slovenia) Rok Zima	(Germany) Stephan Hocke	
677	12	12 January 2011	(South Korea) Pyeongchang (Alpensia HS140)	L _{307}	(Slovenia) Matjaž Pungertar	(Germany) Julian Musiol (Slovenia) Rok Zima		(Germany) Stephan Hocke	
678	13	13 January 2011	(South Korea) Pyeongchang (Alpensia HS140)	L _{308}	(Slovenia) Matjaž Pungertar	(Slovenia) Rok Zima	(Slovenia) Robert Hrgota	(Slovenia) Matjaž Pungertar	
679	14	22 January 2011	(Germany) Titisee-Neustadt (Hochfirstschanze HS142)	L _{309}	(Germany) Maximilian Mechler	(Slovenia) Matic Kramaršič	(Austria) Manuel Poppinger	(Slovenia) Matjaž Pungertar	
680	15	23 January 2011	(Germany) Titisee-Neustadt (Hochfirstschanze HS142)	L _{310}	(Germany) Maximilian Mechler	(Slovenia) Rok Zima	(Germany) Felix Schoft	(Slovenia) Matjaž Pungertar	
681	16	29 January 2011	(Austria) Bischofshofen (Paul-Ausserleitner HS140)	L _{311}	(Austria) Stefan Thurnbichler	(Germany) Maximilian Mechler	(Germany) Felix Brodauf	(Slovenia) Matjaž Pungertar	
682	17	30 January 2011	(Austria) Bischofshofen (Paul-Ausserleitner HS140)	L _{312}	(Austria) Stefan Thurnbichler	(Germany) Felix Schoft	(Germany) Maximilian Mechler	(Austria) S. Thurnbichler	
683	18	5 February 2011	(Germany) Brotterode (Ingelsbergschanze HS117)	L _{313}	(Austria) Stefan Kraft	(Germany) Felix Schoft	(Slovenia) Rok Urbanc	(Austria) S. Thurnbichler	
684	19	6 February 2011	(Germany) Brotterode (Ingelsbergschanze HS117)	L _{314}	(Austria) Thomas Diethart	(Germany) Felix Schoft	(Norway) Vegard Haukø Sklett	(Germany) Julian Musiol	
685	20	12 February 2011	(United States) Iron Mountain (Pine Mountain HS133)	L _{315}	(Austria) Andreas Strolz	(Slovenia) Matjaž Pungertar	(Slovenia) Rok Zima	(Slovenia) Matjaž Pungertar	
686	21	13 February 2011	(United States) Iron Mountain (Pine Mountain HS133)	L _{316}	(Slovenia) Matej Dobovšek	(Austria) Markus Eggenhofer	(Austria) David Unterberger	(Slovenia) Matjaž Pungertar	
687	22	19 February 2011	(Slovenia) Kranj (Bauhenk HS109)	N _{367}	(Slovenia) Dejan Judež	(Norway) Andreas Stjernen	(Austria) Stefan Thurnbichler	(Slovenia) Matjaž Pungertar	
688	23	20 February 2011	(Slovenia) Kranj (Bauhenk HS109)	N _{368}	(Austria) Mario Innauer	(Slovenia) Jure Šinkovec	(Slovenia) Dejan Judež	(Austria) S. Thurnbichler	
689	24	26 February 2011	(Poland) Zakopane (Wielka Krokiew HS134)	L _{317}	(Austria) Mario Innauer	(Germany) Andreas Wank	(Slovenia) Rok Zima	(Austria) Mario Innauer	
690	25	27 February 2011	(Poland) Zakopane (Wielka Krokiew HS134)	L _{318}	(Austria) Thomas Thurnbichler	(Germany) Markus Eisenbichler	(Austria) Michael Hayböck	(Austria) Mario Innauer	
691	26	5 March 2011	(Finland) Kuopio (Puijo HS127)	L _{319}	(Norway) Andreas Stjernen	(Slovenia) Matej Dobovšek	(Germany) Maximilian Mechler	(Austria) Mario Innauer	
692	27	6 March 2011	(Finland) Kuopio (Puijo HS127)	L _{320}	(Germany) Maximilian Mechler	(Finland) Jarkko Määttä	(Austria) Michael Hayböck	(Austria) Mario Innauer	
693	28	11 March 2011	(Poland) Wisła (Malinka HS134)	L _{321}	(Austria) Michael Hayböck	(Norway) K. R. Elverum Sorsell	(Germany) Andreas Wank	(Slovenia) Rok Zima	
694	29	12 March 2011	(Poland) Wisła (Malinka HS134)	L _{322}	(Slovenia) Matic Kramaršič	(Slovenia) Matjaž Pungertar	(Slovenia) Dejan Judež	(Slovenia) Rok Zima	
20th FIS Winter Continental Cup Men's Overall (7 December 2010 – 12 March 2011)					(Slovenia) Rok Zima	(Austria) Mario Innauer	(Germany) Andreas Wank	Winter Overall	

==== Overall ====
Rank	after 29 events	Points
1	(Slovenia) Rok Zima	826
2	(Austria) Mario Innauer	776
3	(Germany) Andreas Wank	750
4	(Slovenia) Dejan Judež	696
5	(Slovenia) Matjaž Pungertar	693
6	(Austria) Stefan Thurnbichler	667
7	(Germany) Felix Schoft	631
8	(Germany) Maximilian Mechler	592
9	(Norway) Andreas Stjernen	573
10	(Slovenia) Matic Kramaršič	562

== Women's Summer ==
Individual women's events in the CC history

Total	L	N	M	Winners
28	—	19	9

after normal hill event in Liberec (1 October 2010)

=== Calendar ===
All	No.	Date	Place (Hill)	Size	Winner	Second	Third	Overall leader	R.
18	1	14 August 2010	(Germany) Bischofsgrün (Ochsenkopfschanze HS71)	M _{008}	(Germany) Jenna Mohr	(United States) Abby Hughes	(United States) Sarah Hendrickson	(Germany) Jenna Mohr	
19	2	15 August 2010	(Germany) Bischofsgrün (Ochsenkopfschanze HS71)	M _{009}	(United States) Sarah Hendrickson	(Japan) Sara Takanashi	(Germany) Anna Häfele	(United States) S. Hendrickson	
20	3	20 August 2010	(Germany) Oberwiesenthal (Fichtelbergschanzen HS106)	N _{011}	(Austria) J. Seifriedsberger	(France) Coline Mattel	(United States) Sarah Hendrickson	(United States) S. Hendrickson	
21	4	21 August 2010	(Germany) Oberwiesenthal (Fichtelbergschanzen HS106)	N _{012}	(Austria) J. Seifriedsberger	(France) Coline Mattel	(Japan) Yūki Itō	(United States) S. Hendrickson	
22	5	11 September 2010	(Norway) Lillehammer (Lysgårdsbakken HS100)	N _{013}	(Austria) Daniela Iraschko	(Austria) J. Seifriedsberger	(United States) Jessica Jerome	(Austria) J. Seifriedsberger	
23	6	12 September 2010	(Norway) Lillehammer (Lysgårdsbakken HS100)	N _{014}	(Austria) Daniela Iraschko	(France) Coline Mattel	(Norway) Line Jahr	(France) Coline Mattel	
24	7	18 September 2010	(Norway) Oslo (Midtstubakken HS106)	N _{015}	(Austria) Daniela Iraschko	(France) Coline Mattel	(Austria) J. Seifriedsberger	(France) Coline Mattel	
25	8	19 September 2010	(Norway) Oslo (Midtstubakken HS106)	N _{016}	(Austria) Daniela Iraschko	(France) Coline Mattel	(Germany) Juliane Seyfarth	(France) Coline Mattel	
26	9	25 September 2010	(Sweden) Falun (Lugnet HS98)	N _{017}	(Austria) Daniela Iraschko	(United States) Lindsey Van	(United States) Jessica Jerome	(France) Coline Mattel	
27	10	26 September 2010	(Sweden) Falun (Lugnet HS98)	N _{018}	(Austria) Daniela Iraschko	(Austria) J. Seifriedsberger	(United States) Lindsey Van	(Austria) Daniela Iraschko	
28	11	1 October 2010	(Czech Republic) Liberec (Ještěd B HS100)	N _{019}	(Italy) Elena Runggaldier	(Austria) J. Seifriedsberger	(Norway) Line Jahr	(Austria) Daniela Iraschko	
3rd FIS Summer Continental Cup Women's Overall (14 August – 1 October 2010)					(Austria) Daniela Iraschko	(Austria) J. Seifriedsberger	(France) Coline Mattel	Summer Overall	

==== Overall ====
Rank	after 11 events	Points
1	(Austria) Daniela Iraschko	600
2	(Austria) Jacqueline Seifriedsberger	590
3	(France) Coline Mattel	503
4	(Japan) Sara Takanashi	397
5	(Japan) Yūki Itō	366
6	(Norway) Line Jahr	347
7	(United States) Jessica Jerome	315
8	(United States) Lindsey Van	291
9	(Japan) Ayumi Watase	279
	(Germany) Melanie Faißt	279

== Women's Winter ==
Individual women's events in the CC history

Total	L	N	M	Winners
123	9	98	16

after normal hill event in Zaō (9 March 2011)

=== Calendar ===
All	No.	Date	Place (Hill)	Size	Winner	Second	Third	Overall leader	R.
104	1	7 December 2010	(Finland) Rovaniemi (Ounasvaara HS100)	N _{085}	(United States) Jessica Jerome	(Austria) Daniela Iraschko	(Norway) Line Jahr	(United States) Jessica Jerome	
105	2	8 December 2010	(Finland) Rovaniemi (Ounasvaara HS100)	N _{086}	(Austria) Daniela Iraschko	(United States) Jessica Jerome	(United States) Lindsey Van	(Austria) Daniela Iraschko (United States) Jessica Jerome	
106	3	11 December 2010	(Norway) Vikersund (Vikersundbakken HS117)	L _{004}	(Austria) Daniela Iraschko	(United States) Sarah Hendrickson	(United States) Lindsey Van	(Austria) Daniela Iraschko	
107	4	12 December 2010	(Norway) Vikersund (Vikersundbakken HS117)	L _{005}	(Austria) Daniela Iraschko	(France) Coline Mattel	(United States) Lindsey Van	(Austria) Daniela Iraschko	
108	5	18 December 2010	(Norway) Notodden (Tveitanbakken HS100)	N _{087}	(Austria) Daniela Iraschko	(United States) Jessica Jerome	(Italy) Elena Runggaldier	(Austria) Daniela Iraschko	
109	6	19 December 2010	(Norway) Notodden (Tveitanbakken HS100)	N _{088}	(France) Coline Mattel	(Austria) Daniela Iraschko	(Germany) Melanie Faißt	(Austria) Daniela Iraschko	
110	7	8 January 2011	(Germany) Schonach (Langenwaldschanze HS106)	N _{089}	(Austria) Daniela Iraschko	(France) Coline Mattel	(Germany) Melanie Faißt	(Austria) Daniela Iraschko	
		9 January 2011	(Germany) Schonach (Langenwaldschanze HS106)	N _{cnx}	cancelled due to strong wind and rain (rescheduled to Hinterzarten on 12 January morning)			—	
111	8	(Note: Cancelled men's normal hill competition in Schonach (9 January) was rescheduled to Hinterzarten on 12 January (morning event).)12 January 2011	(Germany) Hinterzarten (Rothaus-Schanze HS108)	N _{090}	(Austria) Daniela Iraschko	(France) Coline Mattel	(Slovenia) Eva Logar	(Austria) Daniela Iraschko	
112	9	12 January 2011	(Germany) Hinterzarten (Rothaus-Schanze HS108)	N _{091}	(France) Coline Mattel	(Austria) Daniela Iraschko	(United States) Lindsey Van	(Austria) Daniela Iraschko	
113	10	15 January 2011	(Germany) Braunlage (Wurmbergschanze HS100)	N _{092}	(France) Coline Mattel	(Austria) Daniela Iraschko	(Austria) J. Seifriedsberger	(Austria) Daniela Iraschko	
114	11	16 January 2011	(Germany) Braunlage (Wurmbergschanze HS100)	N _{093}	(France) Coline Mattel	(Austria) Daniela Iraschko	(Germany) Melanie Faißt	(Austria) Daniela Iraschko	
FIS Ladies Winter Tournament (2 – 10 January 2010)					(France) Coline Mattel	(Austria) Daniela Iraschko	(United States) Jessica Jerome	Winter Tournament	
115	12	22 January 2011	(Slovenia) Ljubno (Savina HS95)	N _{094}	(Austria) Daniela Iraschko	(Slovenia) Eva Logar	(Slovenia) Maja Vtič	(Austria) Daniela Iraschko	
116	13	23 January 2011	(Slovenia) Ljubno (Savina HS95)	N _{095}	(Austria) Daniela Iraschko	(Germany) Juliane Seyfarth	(Slovenia) Maja Vtič	(Austria) Daniela Iraschko	
117	14	5 February 2011	(Germany) Brotterode (Ingelsbergschanze HS117)	L _{006}	(Austria) Daniela Iraschko	(France) Coline Mattel	(Italy) Lisa Demetz	(Austria) Daniela Iraschko	
118	15	6 February 2011	(Germany) Brotterode (Ingelsbergschanze HS117)	L _{007}	(Austria) Daniela Iraschko	(France) Coline Mattel	(Germany) Melanie Faißt	(Austria) Daniela Iraschko	
119	16	12 February 2011	(Poland) Zakopane (Średnia Krokiew HS94)	N _{096}	(France) Coline Mattel	(Japan) Sara Takanashi	(Slovenia) Eva Logar	(Austria) Daniela Iraschko	
120	17	13 February 2011	(Poland) Zakopane (Średnia Krokiew HS94)	N _{097}	(France) Coline Mattel	(Japan) Sara Takanashi	(Italy) Elena Runggaldier	(Austria) Daniela Iraschko	
121	18	19 February 2011	(Austria) Ramsau (W90-Mattensprungan. HS117)	L _{008}	(Japan) Sara Takanashi	(Germany) Ulrike Gräßler	(Austria) J. Seifriedsberger	(Austria) Daniela Iraschko	
122	19	20 February 2011	(Austria) Ramsau (W90-Mattensprungan. HS117)	L _{009}	(Japan) Sara Takanashi	(Germany) Ulrike Gräßler	(Germany) Melanie Faißt	(Austria) Daniela Iraschko	
		1 March 2011	(Japan) Hakuba (Olympic Hills HS98)	N _{cnx}	cancelled due to the financial problems of the organizers			—	
		2 March 2011	(Japan) Hakuba (Olympic Hills HS98)	N _{cnx}	cancelled due to the financial problems of the organizers			—	
123	20	9 March 2011	(Japan) Zaō (Yamagata HS106)	N _{098}	(Japan) Yūki Itō	(Austria) J. Seifriedsberger	(Slovenia) Maja Vtič	(Austria) Daniela Iraschko	
		10 March 2011	(Japan) Zaō (Yamagata HS106)	N _{cnx}	cancelled due to too strong winds			—	
7th FIS Winter Continental Cup Women's Overall (7 December 2010 – 9 March 2011)					(Austria) Daniela Iraschko	(France) Coline Mattel	(Slovenia) Eva Logar	Winter Overall	

==== Overall ====
Rank	after 20 events	Points
1	(Austria) Daniela Iraschko	1445
2	(France) Coline Mattel	1100
3	(Slovenia) Eva Logar	704
4	(Germany) Melanie Faißt	697
5	(Austria) Jacqueline Seifriedsberger	629
6	(United States) Jessica Jerome	598
7	(Germany) Ulrike Gräßler	567
8	(Germany) Juliane Seyfarth	543
9	(United States) Lindsey Van	519
10	(Slovenia) Maja Vtič	506

== Europa Cup vs. Continental Cup ==
- Last two Europa Cup seasons (1991/92 and 1992/93) are recognized as first two Continental Cup seasons by International Ski Federation (FIS), although Continental Cup under this name officially started first season in 1993/94 season.

== See also ==
- 2010–11 FIS World Cup
- 2010 FIS Grand Prix
