= 2010 FIS Ski Jumping Grand Prix =

International ski jumping competition

Grand Prix 2010
Winners
- Overall: (Japan) Daiki Ito
- The Nations GP: (Poland) Adam Małysz
- Nations Cup: Poland

Competitions
- Venues: 7
- Individual: 9
- Team: 1

The 2010 FIS Ski Jumping Grand Prix was the 17th Summer Grand Prix season in ski jumping on plastic. Season began on 7 August 2010 in Hinterzarten, Germany and ended on 3 October 2010 in Klingenthal.

Other competitive circuits this season included the World Cup and Continental Cup.

== Calendar ==
=== Men ===
Num	Season	Date	Place	Hill	Size	Winner	Second	Third	Yellow bib	Ref.
108	1	8 August 2010	(Germany) Hinterzarten	Rothaus-Schanze HS108	NH	(Poland) Adam Małysz	(Austria) Thomas Morgenstern	(Finland) Kalle Keituri	(Poland) Adam Małysz	
109	2	13 August 2010	(France) Courchevel	Tremplin du Praz HS132	LH	(Japan) Daiki Ito	(Austria) David Zauner (Austria) Thomas Morgenstern		(Austria) Thomas Morgenstern	
110	3	15 August 2010	(Switzerland) Einsiedeln	Andreas Küttel Schanze HS117	LH	(Japan) Daiki Ito	(Poland) Adam Małysz	(Poland) Maciej Kot	(Japan) Daiki Ito	
The-Nations-Grand-Prix Overall (8–15 August 2010)						(Poland) Adam Małysz	(Austria) Thomas Morgenstern	(Japan) Daiki Ito		
111	4	20 August 2010	(Poland) Wisła	Malinka HS134 (night)	LH	(Poland) Adam Małysz	(Poland) Kamil Stoch	(Japan) Daiki Ito	(Poland) Adam Małysz	
112	5	21 August 2010	(Poland) Wisła	Malinka HS134	LH	(Poland) Kamil Stoch	(Japan) Daiki Ito	(Norway) Tom Hilde	(Poland) Adam Małysz (Japan) Daiki Ito	
113	6	28 August 2010	(Japan) Hakuba	Olympic Ski Jumps HS131 (night)	LH	(Japan) Daiki Ito	(Poland) Dawid Kubacki	(Poland) Kamil Stoch	(Japan) Daiki Ito	
114	7	29 August 2010	(Japan) Hakuba	Olympic Ski Jumps HS131 (night)	LH	(Poland) Kamil Stoch	(Poland) Dawid Kubacki	(Japan) Fumihisa Yumoto	(Japan) Daiki Ito	
115	8	1 October 2010	(Czech Republic) Liberec	Ještěd A HS134 (night)	LH	(Poland) Adam Małysz	(Norway) Tom Hilde	(Poland) Kamil Stoch	(Japan) Daiki Ito	
116	9	3 October 2010	(Germany) Klingenthal	Vogtland Arena HS140	LH	(Poland) Kamil Stoch	(Austria) Thomas Morgenstern	(Austria) Gregor Schlierenzauer	(Japan) Daiki Ito	

=== Men's team ===
Num	Season	Date	Place	Hill	Size	Winner	Second	Third	Yellow bib	Ref.
13	1	7 August 2010	(Germany) Hinterzarten	Rothaus-Schanze HS108	NH	Poland Maciej Kot; Krzysztof Miętus; Dawid Kubacki; Adam Małysz	Norway Bjørn Einar Romøren; Johan Remen Evensen; Anders Jacobsen; Tom Hilde	Germany Michael Neumayer; Andreas Wank; Severin Freund; Michael Uhrmann	Poland	

== Standings ==
=== Overall ===
Rank	after 9 events	Points
1	(Japan) Daiki Ito	530
2	(Poland) Kamil Stoch	500
3	(Poland) Adam Małysz	480
4	(Austria) Gregor Schlierenzauer	383
5	(Poland) Dawid Kubacki	348

=== Nations Cup ===
Rank	after 10 events	Points
1	Poland	2173
2	Japan	1351
3	Austria	997
4	Norway	910
5	Germany	812

=== The Nations Grand Prix ===
Rank	after 3 events	Points
1	(Poland) Adam Małysz	648.6
2	(Austria) Thomas Morgenstern	633.7
3	(Japan) Daiki Ito	632.5
4	(Finland) Kalle Keituri	599.2
5	(Switzerland) Simon Ammann	592.8
