= Innauer =

Innauer is a surname. Notable people with the surname include:

- Mario Innauer (born 1990), Austrian ski jumper
- Toni Innauer (born 1958), Austrian ski jumper
