= 2019–20 Four Hills Tournament =

Ski jumping competition

Four Hills Tournament at the 2019–20 FIS Ski Jumping World Cup
- Venue: Schattenbergschanze, Große Olympiaschanze, Bergiselschanze, Paul-Ausserleitner-Schanze
- Location: Austria, Germany
- Dates: 29 December 2019 – 6 January 2020

Medalists
gold medal	(Poland) Dawid Kubacki
silver medal	(Norway) Marius Lindvik
bronze medal	(Germany) Karl Geiger

The 2019–20 Four Hills Tournament took place at the four traditional venues of Oberstdorf, Garmisch-Partenkirchen, Innsbruck, and Bischofshofen, located in Germany and Austria, between 29 December 2019 and 6 January 2020.

== Results ==
=== Oberstdorf ===
HS 137 Schattenbergschanze, Germany
29 December 2019

Rank	Name	Nationality	Jump 1 (m)	Round 1 (pts)	Jump 2 (m)	Round 2 (pts)	Total Points
1	Ryōyū Kobayashi	Japan	138.0	154.8	134.0	150.3	305.1
2	Karl Geiger	Germany	135.0	147.1	134.0	148.8	295.9
3	Dawid Kubacki	Poland	132.0	143.8	133.0	150.9	294.7
4	Stefan Kraft	Austria	131.0	145.6	132.0	145.6	291.2
5	Piotr Żyła	Poland	132.0	141.3	129.0	140.2	281.5
6	Philipp Aschenwald	Austria	132.5	140.6	129.5	139.7	280.3
7	Yukiya Satō	Japan	129.5	134.8	132.0	145.3	280.1
8	Robert Johansson	Norway	134.0	139.7	130.5	140.1	279.8
9	Domen Prevc	Slovenia	129.5	137.2	134.0	142.3	279.5
10	Marius Lindvik	Norway	139.0	143.1	124.5	135.4	278.5

=== Garmisch-Partenkirchen ===
HS 142 Große Olympiaschanze, Germany
1 January 2020

Rank	Name	Nationality	Jump 1 (m)	Round 1 (pts)	Jump 2 (m)	Round 2 (pts)	Total Points
1	Marius Lindvik	Norway	143.5	147.7	136.0	142.1	289.8
2	Karl Geiger	Germany	132.0	138.7	141.5	146.3	285.0
3	Dawid Kubacki	Poland	137.0	140.2	139.5	143.8	284.0
4	Ryōyū Kobayashi	Japan	132.0	137.7	141.0	144.4	282.1
5	Daiki Itō	Japan	131.0	133.4	136.5	140.0	273.4
6	Daniel Huber	Austria	136.5	136.6	134.0	135.5	272.1
7	Constantin Schmid	Germany	134.5	135.4	134.5	136.1	271.5
8	Roman Koudelka	Czech Republic	135.0	135.1	133.0	132.2	267.3
9	Johann André Forfang	Norway	132.0	132.4	135.0	133.8	266.2
10	Markus Eisenbichler	Germany	129.0	130.1	134.5	136.0	266.1

=== Innsbruck ===
HS 128 Bergiselschanze, Austria
4 January 2020

Rank	Name	Nationality	Jump 1 (m)	Round 1 (pts)	Jump 2 (m)	Round 2 (pts)	Total Points
1	Marius Lindvik	Norway	133.0	139.5	120.5	113.8	253.3
2	Dawid Kubacki	Poland	133.0	138.2	120.5	113.8	252.0
3	Daniel-André Tande	Norway	126.0	122.8	131.0	126.5	249.3
4	Stefan Kraft	Austria	123.0	124.8	127.5	120.2	245.0
5	Stephan Leyhe	Germany	125.0	126.6	125.0	115.0	241.6
6	Gregor Schlierenzauer	Austria	127.5	127.5	126.0	112.5	240.0
7	Johann André Forfang	Norway	131.0	129.2	120.5	109.2	238.4
8	Karl Geiger	Germany	117.5	111.8	126.0	124.7	236.5
9	Peter Prevc	Slovenia	127.0	127.6	122.0	108.7	236.3
10	Domen Prevc	Slovenia	125.0	126.7	122.0	107.9	234.6

=== Bischofshofen ===
HS 142 Paul-Ausserleitner-Schanze, Austria
6 January 2020

Rank	Name	Nationality	Jump 1 (m)	Round 1 (pts)	Jump 2 (m)	Round 2 (pts)	Total Points
1	Dawid Kubacki	Poland	143.0	151.6	140.5	149.3	300.9
2	Karl Geiger	Germany	140.0	147.7	136.0	143.3	291.0
3	Marius Lindvik	Norway	139.0	146.5	137.0	142.9	289.4
4	Stefan Kraft	Austria	138.0	144.2	137.0	143.2	287.4
5	Peter Prevc	Slovenia	136.5	139.6	138.0	144.0	283.6
6	Daniel-André Tande	Norway	137.5	141.4	135.0	137.9	279.3
7	Ryōyū Kobayashi	Japan	135.5	137.8	138.0	141.2	279.0
8	Daiki Itō	Japan	137.0	140.3	134.0	136.1	276.4
9	Domen Prevc	Slovenia	140.0	143.0	133.0	132.5	275.5
10	Philipp Aschenwald	Austria	136.0	135.2	135.0	139.4	274.6

== Overall standings ==
The final standings after all four events:

Rank	Name	Nationality	Oberstdorf	Garmisch- Partenkirchen	Innsbruck	Bischofshofen	Total Points
1st place, gold medalist(s)	Dawid Kubacki	Poland	294.7 (3)	284.0 (3)	252.0 (2)	300.9 (1)	1,131.6
2nd place, silver medalist(s)	Marius Lindvik	Norway	278.5 (10)	289.8 (1)	253.3 (1)	289.4 (3)	1,111.0
3rd place, bronze medalist(s)	Karl Geiger	Germany	295.9 (2)	285.0 (2)	236.5 (8)	291.0 (2)	1,108.4
4	Ryōyū Kobayashi	Japan	305.1 (1)	282.1 (4)	229.8 (14)	279.0 (7)	1,096.0
5	Stefan Kraft	Austria	291.2 (4)	262.4 (13)	245.0 (4)	287.4 (4)	1,086.0
6	Johann André Forfang	Norway	272.5 (15)	266.2 (9)	238.4 (7)	273.9 (11)	1,051.0
7	Domen Prevc	Slovenia	279.5 (9)	261.3 (17)	234.6 (10)	275.5 (9)	1,050.9
8	Peter Prevc	Slovenia	265.3 (21)	263.6 (12)	236.3 (9)	283.6 (5)	1,048.8
9	Daiki Itō	Japan	267.3 (18)	273.4 (5)	221.9 (18)	276.4 (8)	1,039.0
10	Stephan Leyhe	Germany	276.6 (13)	261.6 (16)	241.6 (5)	257.7 (18)	1,037.5
