= Dejan Judež =

Slovenian ski jumper (born 1990)

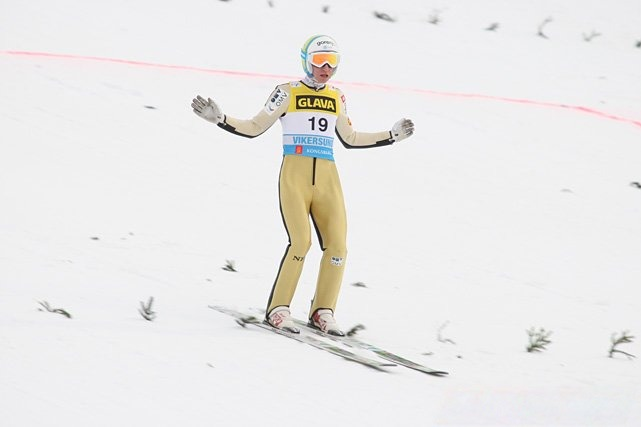
Dejan Judež

Dejan Judež (born 2 August 1990 in Zagorje ob Savi) is a Slovenian ski jumper.

Judež became a national champion of Slovenia in 2011. On 18 March 2011 he made his first appearance in World Cup and also won his first points for 25th place.
