= Dawid Kubacki =

Polish ski jumper (born 1990)

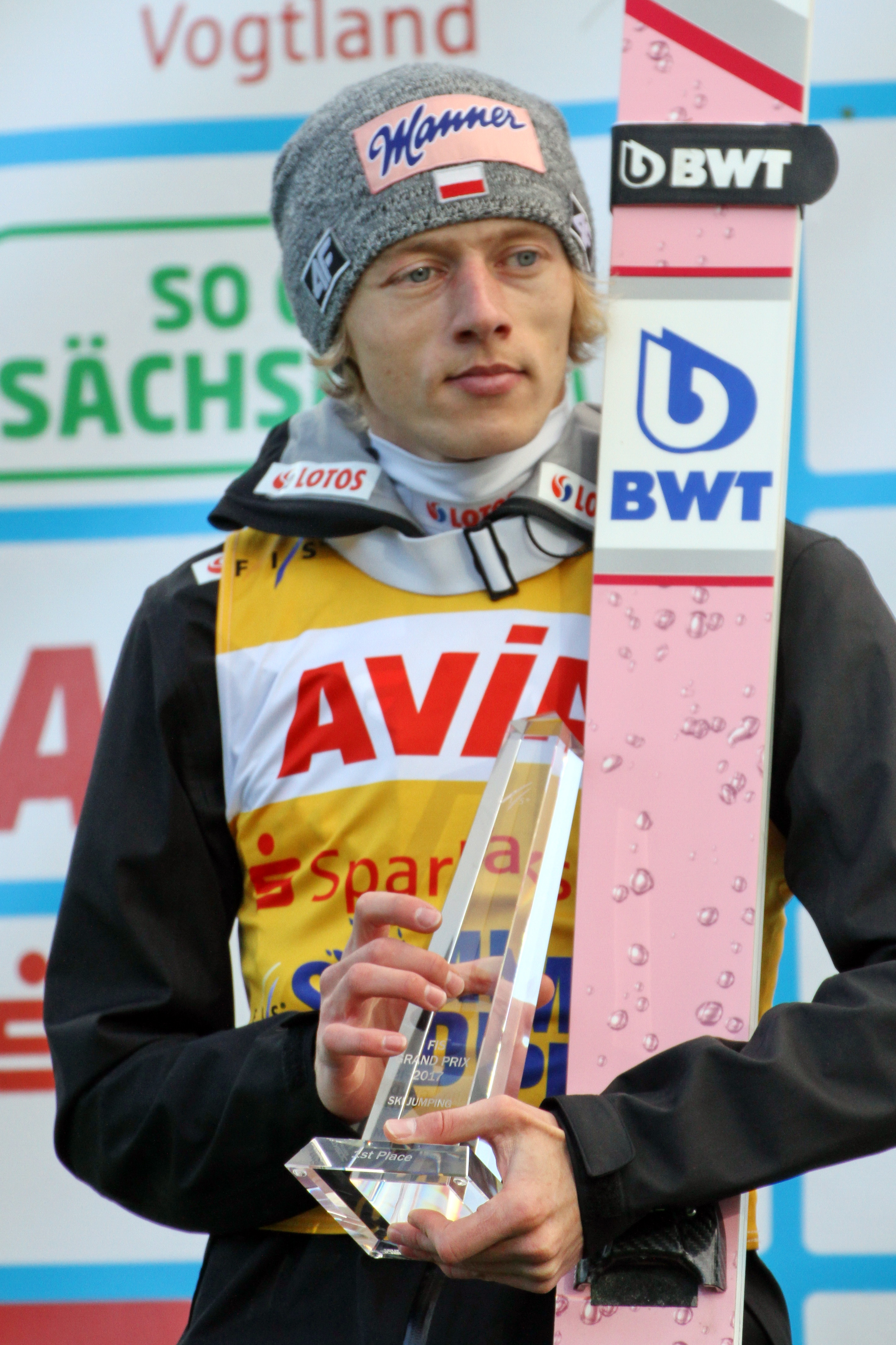
- Kubacki in Klingenthal, 2017

Personal information
- Nationality: Poland
- Born: 12 March 1990 (age 36) Nowy Targ, Poland
- Height: 1.80 m (5 ft 11 in)

Sport
- Sport: Skiing
- Club: Wisła Zakopane

World Cup career
- Seasons: 2008–present
- Indiv. starts: 231
- Indiv. podiums: 38
- Indiv. wins: 11
- Team podiums: 22
- Team wins: 7
- Four Hills titles: 1 (2020)

Achievements and titles
- Personal bests: 236.5 m (776 ft); Planica, 25 March 2018
Medal record
Event	1st	2nd	3rd
Olympic Games	0	0	2
World Championships	2	0	3
Ski Flying World Championships	0	0	2
European Games	1	0	0
Total	3	0	7
Representing Poland
Men's ski jumping
Olympic Games
Bronze medal – third place	2018 Pyeongchang	Team LH
Bronze medal – third place	2022 Beijing	Individual NH
World Championships
Gold medal – first place	2017 Lahti	Team LH
Gold medal – first place	2019 Seefeld	Individual NH
Bronze medal – third place	2013 Val di Fiemme	Team LH
Bronze medal – third place	2021 Oberstdorf	Team LH
Bronze medal – third place	2023 Planica	Individual LH
European Games
Gold medal – first place	2023 Kraków–Małopolska	Individual LH
Men's ski flying
Ski Flying World Championships
Bronze medal – third place	2018 Oberstdorf	Team
Bronze medal – third place	2020 Planica	Team
- Updated on 3 March 2023

Dawid Grzegorz Kubacki (Polish pronunciation: [ˈdavid kuˈbat͡ski]; born 12 March 1990) is a Polish ski jumper. He is a member of the national team and competed at the Winter Olympics in 2014, 2018 and 2022, winning two bronze medals. He is the 2019 World Champion on the normal hill and winner of the 2019-20 Four Hills Tournament, as well as the 2017 World Champion and bronze medal winner at the 2013 World Championships in the large hill team competitions.

== Personal life ==
The oldest of two siblings, Kubacki was born in Nowy Targ. Kubacki is married to Marta (née Majcher), a former fencer, whom he met at university. They were engaged in August 2018 and married on 1 May 2019. They have two daughters, born in 2020 and 2023, and a son, born in 2026.

A Catholic, he makes the sign of the cross before each jump.

== Career ==
On 25 September 2005, he debuted in the FIS Cup competition in Bischofshofen. On 14 January 2006, he scored his first points in the FIS Ski Jumping World Cup, taking 22nd place in the competition in Harrachov. On 18 March 2007, for the first time, he took part in the Continental Cup. He was 26th in the competition in Zakopane.

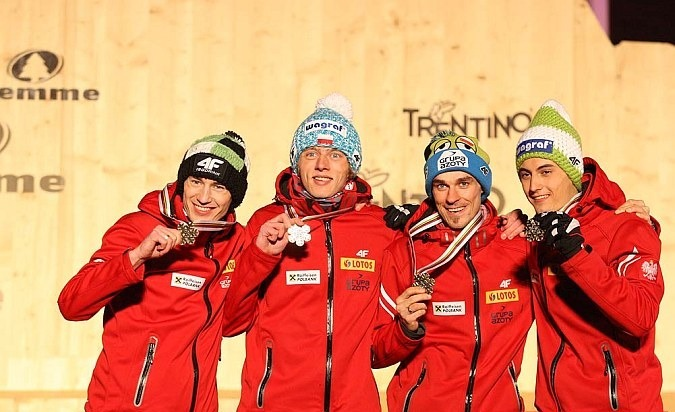
Medal ceremony of the 2013 World Championship after winning bronze in team: Stoch, Kubacki, Żyła and Kot.

=== 2012/2013 ===
In individual competitions at FIS Nordic World Ski Championships 2013 took 31st place on the normal hill and 20th on the large hill. On 2 March 2013, he won a bronze medal in the team competition with his teammates Kamil Stoch, Maciej Kot, and Piotr Żyła. Kubacki jumped 126 m and 128 m. His team originally took fourth place, but after re-counting the scores because of Thomas Morgenstern, who noticed a mistake with the points and at the request of the Germans, they finished in third place (The Norwegian team was originally in front of the Polish team, but Anders Bardal's jump was badly counted).

=== 2014/2015 ===
Kubacki took part in the World Championships 2015 in Falun, Sweden. He was in the competition on the large hill Lugnet (K-120) and qualified to the second round, but he only took 29th place.

=== 2016/2017 ===
On 3 December 2016, the Polish national team, again composed of Żyła, Stoch, Kubacki and Kot won Poland's first ever World Cup team event. In Zakopane, the Polish team, again composed of Stoch, Kubacki, Kot, and Żyła, achieved the second place in the team event. On 28 January 2017 Poland won their second team competition in history in Willingen.

On 4 March 2017, the Polish national team, again composed of Żyła, Kubacki, Kot and Stoch, achieved their first title in the team event at the 2017 World Championships. They beat Norway and Austria at Salpausselkä K116 in Lahti, Finland.

=== 2017/2018 ===
The summer season was very successful for him. He won 5 out of 9 competitions: in Wisła, Hinterzarten, Courchevel, Hinzenbach and Klingenthal. He won all the competitions in which he took off because he missed four competitions in Hakuba, Japan, and Chaykovsky, Russia. He repeated the feat of Takanobu Okabe from 1994 (1st edition). On 3 October 2017, he won the overall classification of the 2017 FIS Ski Jumping Grand Prix with 500 points. He maintained the winning streak of Poles in this tournament, repeating the success of Maciej Kot from the previous year. In addition, Poland triumphed in the Nations Cup classification.

Kubacki achieved good results since the very start of the winter season after winning the overall classification of the Summer Grand Prix. On 30 December 2017, Kubacki reached the lowest level of the podium in Oberstdorf, behind the winner Kamil Stoch. He waited for 143 competitions for his first individual podium. He had a chance to reach overall podium of 2017-18 Four Hills Tournament, but he lost his chance in the last jump in Bischofshofen and in the final ranking, he took 6th place, which was his best result in Four Hills tournament in career. On 21 January 2018, the Polish national team, composed of Stoch, Hula, Kubacki, and Żyła, won the first ever medal, a bronze, for Poland in ski flying in team competition. On the same day, coach Horngacher officially appointed him to the 2018 Winter Olympics. Once again, Kubacki placed third in the competition, this time in Willingen.

On 19 February 2018, Kubacki and his teammates Maciej Kot, Stefan Hula and Kamil Stoch achieved Poland's first medal in the team event at the Olympics. They claimed a bronze behind Norway and Germany.

== Olympic Games ==
Place	Day	Year	Locality	Hill	Point K	HS	Competition	Jump 1	Jump 2	Note (points)	Lost (points)	Winner
32.	9 February	2014	Krasnaya Polyana	RusSki Gorki	K-95	HS-106	individual	97.5 m	—	118.3	159.7	Kamil Stoch
35.	10 February	2018	Pyeongchang	Alpensia	K-98	HS-109	individual	88.0 m	—	92.0	167.3	Andreas Wellinger
10.	17 February	2018	Pyeongchang	Alpensia	K-125	HS-142	individual	134.5 m	126.0 m	258.0	27.7	Kamil Stoch
3.	19 February	2018	Pyeongchang	Alpensia	K-125	HS-142	team	138.5 m	134.5 m	1072.4 (275.0)	26.1	Norway
3.	6 February	2022	Zhangjiakou	Snow Ruyi	K-95	HS-106	individual	104.0 m	103.0 m	265.9	9.1	Ryōyū Kobayashi
6.	7 February	2022	Zhangjiakou	Snow Ruyi	K-95	HS-106	mixed team	96.0 m	101.0 m	763.2 (238.2)	238.2	Slovenia
26.	12 February	2022	Zhangjiakou	Snow Ruyi	K-125	HS-140	individual	131.0 m	131.5 m	251.2	44.9	Marius Lindvik
6.	14 February	2022	Zhangjiakou	Snow Ruyi	K-125	HS-140	team	122.0 m	126.0 m	880.1 (203.0)	62.6	Austria

== World Championships ==
Place	Day	Year	Locality	Hill	Point K	HS	Competition	Jump 1	Jump 2	Note (points)	Loss (points)	Winner
31.	23 February	2013	Predazzo	Trampolino Dal Ben	K-95	HS-106	individual	93.5 m	—	103.4	149.0	Anders Bardal
20.	28 February	2013	Predazzo	Trampolino Dal Ben	K-120	HS-134	individual	126.5 m	126.0 m	265.3	30.5	Kamil Stoch
3.	2 March	2013	Predazzo	Trampolino Dal Ben	K-120	HS-134	team	126.0 m	128.0 m	1121.0 (276.2)	14.9	Austria
29.	26 February	2015	Falun	Lugnet	K-120	HS-134	individual	115.5 m	115.5 m	188.7	80.0	Severin Freund
8.	25 February	2017	Lahti	Salpausselkä	K-90	HS-97	individual	96.5 m	93.5 m	251.5	19.3	Stefan Kraft
8.	2 March	2017	Lahti	Salpausselkä	K-116	HS-130	individual	128.5 m	123.0 m	263.8	15.5	Stefan Kraft
1.	4 March	2017	Lahti	Salpausselkä	K-116	HS-130	team	129,0 m	119,5 m	1104.2 (267.6)	—	—
12.	23 February	2019	Innsbruck	Bergisel	K-120	HS-130	individual	128.5 m	125.5 m	240.2	39.2	Markus Eisenbichler
4.	24 February	2019	Innsbruck	Bergisel	K-120	HS-130	team	127.0 m	126.5 m	909.1 (237.6)	78.4	Germany
1.	1 March	2019	Seefeld	Toni-Seelos-Olympiaschanze	K-99	HS-109	individual	93.0 m	104.5 m	218.3	—	—
6.	2 March	2019	Seefeld	Toni-Seelos-Olympiaschanze	K-99	HS-109	mixed team	112.0 m	110.0 m	914.9 (265.4)	97.3	Germany
5.	27 February	2021	Oberstdorf	Schattenbergschanze	K-95	HS-106	individual	102.0 m	99.0 m	257.1	11.7	Piotr Żyła
6.	28 February	2021	Oberstdorf	Schattenbergschanze	K-95	HS-106	mixed team	97.0 m	103.0 m	837.6 (259.9)	163.2	Germany
15.	5 March	2021	Oberstdorf	Schattenbergschanze	K-120	HS-137	individual	130.5 m	119.0 m	235.8	40.7	Stefan Kraft
3.	6 March	2021	Oberstdorf	Schattenbergschanze	K-120	HS-137	team	131.0 m	127.5 m	1031.2 (257.3)	15.4	Germany

== Ski Flying World Championships ==
Place	Day	Year	Locality	Hill	Point K	HS	Competition	Jump 1	Jump 2	Jump 3	Jump 4	Note (points)	Loss (points)	Winner
15.	15–16 January	2016	Tauplitz	Kulm	K-200	HS-225	individual	208.0 m	200.5 m	206.5 m	—	519.1	121.0	Peter Prevc
5.	17 January	2016	Tauplitz	Kulm	K-200	HS-225	team	166.0 m		190.0 m		1211.9 (266.0)	255.8	Norway
10.	19–20 January	2018	Oberstdorf	Heini-Klopfer-Skiflugschanze	K-200	HS-235	individual	207.5 m	208.0 m	215.5 m	—	589.8	62.1	Daniel Andre Tande
3.	21 January	2018	Oberstdorf	Heini-Klopfer-Skiflugschanze	K-200	HS-235	team	204.5 m		221.5 m		1592.1 (400.5)	70.1	Norway
15.	11–12 December	2020	Planica	Letalnica bratov Gorišek	K-200	HS-240	individual	219.0 m	215.5 m	211.0 m	196.0 m	754.4	122.8	Karl Geiger
3.	13 December	2020	Planica	Letalnica bratov Gorišek	K-200	HS-240	team	211.0 m		209.0 m		1665.5 (393.0)	62.2	Norway
5.	13 March	2022	Vikersund	Vikersundbakken	K-200	HS-240	team	213.0 m		212.0 m		1495.8 (373.1)	215.7	Slovenia

== World Cup ==
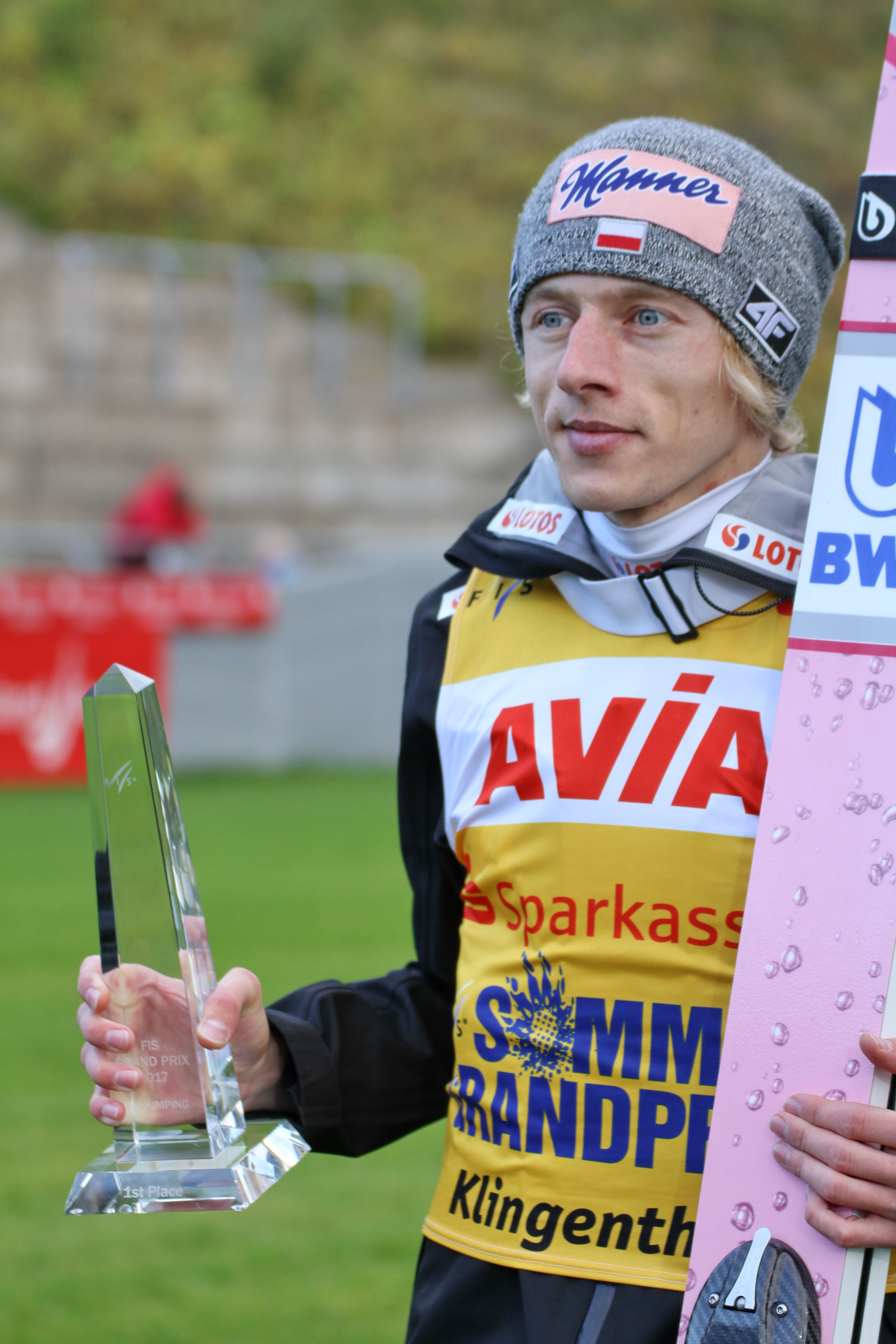
Kubacki after winning competition of the 2017 FIS Ski Jumping Grand Prix in Klingenthal.

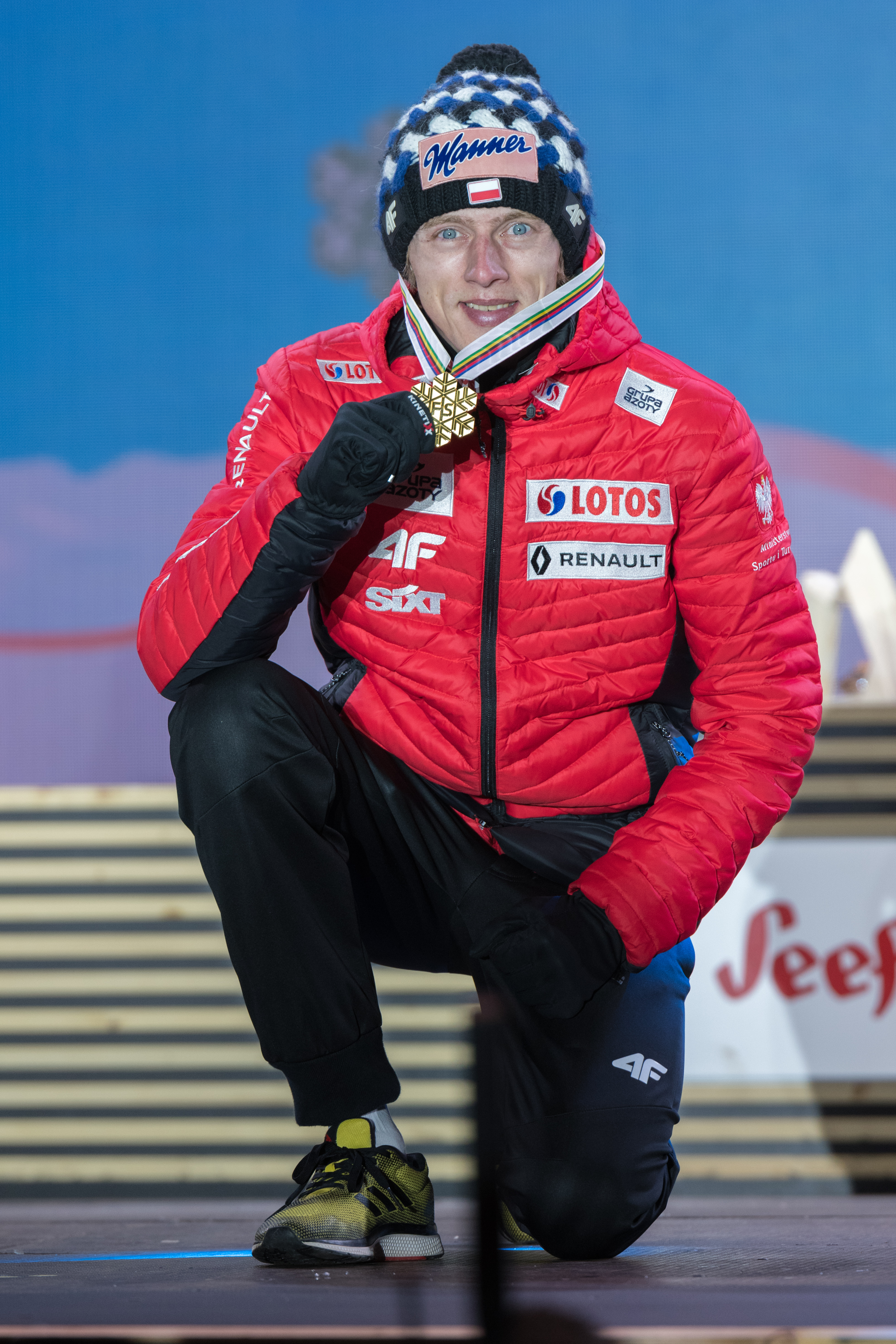
Kubacki after medal ceremony of the FIS Nordic World Ski Championships 2019 in Seefeld.

=== Season standings ===
Season	Overall	Ski-Flying	Four Hills Tournament	Raw Air	Willingen Five	Planica7	Titisee-Neustadt Five
2007–08	–	–	–	–	–	—	—
2008–09	–	–	–	–	–	—	—
2009–10	–	–	–	–	–	—	—
2010–11	–	–	43	–	–	—	—
2011–12	–	–	63	—	—	—	—
2012–13	36	42	31	—	—	—	—
2013–14	49	–	55	—	—	—	—
2014–15	53	–	36	—	—	—	—
2015–16	29	25	35	—	—	—	—
2016–17	19	18	15	18	—	—	—
2017–18	9	16	6	8	6	16	—
2018–19	5	5	4	7	5	7	—
2019–20	4	12	1	16	14	—	2
2020–21	8	19	3	—	5	15	—
2021–22	27	11	22	21	—	17	—
2022–23	4	22	2	23	—	—	—

=== Individual starts ===
Season	1	2	3	4	5	6	7	8	9	10	11	12	13	14	15	16	17	18	19	20	21	22	23	24	25	26	27	28	29	30	31	32	Points
2007/08	Kuusamo HS142	Trondheim HS131	Trondheim HS131	Villach HS98	Villach HS98	Engelberg HS137	Engelberg HS137	Oberstdorf HS137	Garmisch-Partenkirchen HS140	Bischofshofen HS140	Bischofshofen HS140	Predazzo HS134	Predazzo HS134	Harrachov HS205	Zakopane HS134	Zakopane HS134	Sapporo HS134	Sapporo HS134	Liberec HS134	Liberec HS134	Willingen HS145	Kuopio HS127	Kuopio HS127	Lillehammer HS138	Oslo HS128	Planica HS215	Planica HS215						0
2007/08	–	–	–	–	–	–	–	–	–	–	–	–	–	–	q	q	–	–	–	–	–	–	–	–	–	–	–						0
2008/09	Kuusamo HS142	Trondheim HS140	Trondheim HS140	Pragelato HS140	Pragelato HS140	Engelberg HS137	Engelberg HS137	Oberstdorf HS137	Garmisch-Partenkirchen HS140	Innsbruck HS130	Bischofshofen HS140	Tauplitz HS200	Tauplitz HS200	Zakopane HS134	Zakopane HS134	Whistler HS140	Whistler HS140	Sapporo HS134	Willingen HS145	Klingenthal HS140	Oberstdorf HS213	Lahti HS97	Kuopio HS127	Lillehammer HS138	Vikersund HS207	Planica HS215	Planica HS215						0
2008/09	–	–	–	–	–	–	–	–	–	–	–	–	–	49	–	–	–	–	–	–	–	–	–	–	–	–	–						0
2009/10	Kuusamo HS142	Lillehammer HS138	Lillehammer HS138	Engelberg HS137	Engelberg HS137	Engelberg HS137	Oberstdorf HS137	Garmisch-Partenkirchen HS140	Innsbruck HS130	Bischofshofen HS140	Bad Mitterndorf HS200	Bad Mitterndorf HS200	Sapporo HS134	Sapporo HS134	Zakopane HS134	Zakopane HS134	Oberstdorf HS213	Klingenthal HS140	Willingen HS145	Lahti HS130	Kuopio HS127	Lillehammer HS138	Oslo HS134										0
2009/10	–	–	–	–	–	–	–	–	–	–	–	–	37	32	40	43	–	–	–	–	–	–	–										0
2010/11	Kuusamo HS142	Kuopio HS127	Lillehammer HS138	Lillehammer HS138	Engelberg HS137	Engelberg HS137	Engelberg HS137	Oberstdorf HS137	Garmisch-Partenkirchen HS140	Innsbruck HS130	Bischofshofen HS140	Harrachov HS205	Harrachov HS205	Sapporo HS134	Sapporo HS134	Zakopane HS134	Zakopane HS134	Zakopane HS134	Willingen HS145	Klingenthal HS140	Oberstdorf HS213	Vikersund HS225	Vikersund HS225	Lahti HS130	Planica HS215	Planica HS215							0
2010/11	q	q	q	44	q	q	32	40	40	48	43	q	q	–	–	47	q	–	–	–	–	–	–	–	–	–							0
2011/12	Kuusamo HS142	Lillehammer HS100	Lillehammer HS138	Harrachov HS142	Harrachov HS142	Engelberg HS137	Engelberg HS137	Oberstdorf HS137	Garmisch-Partenkirchen HS140	Innsbruck HS130	Bischofshofen HS140	Bad Mitterndorf HS200	Bad Mitterndorf HS200	Zakopane HS134	Zakopane HS134	Sapporo HS134	Sapporo HS134	Predazzo HS134	Predazzo HS134	Willingen HS145	Oberstdorf HS213	Lahti HS97	Trondheim HS140	Oslo HS134	Planica HS215	Planica HS215							0
2011/12	36	46	q	34	q	q	q	–	–	–	36	–	–	–	–	–	–	–	–	–	–	–	–	–	–	–							0
2012/13	Lillehammer HS100	Lillehammer HS138	Kuusamo HS142	Krasnaja Polana HS106	Krasnaja Polana HS106	Engelberg HS137	Engelberg HS137	Oberstdorf HS137	Garmisch-Partenkirchen HS140	Innsbruck HS130	Bischofshofen HS140	Wisła HS134	Zakopane HS134	Sapporo HS134	Sapporo HS134	Vikersund HS225	Vikersund HS225	Harrachov HS205	Harrachov HS205	Klingenthal HS140	Oberstdorf HS213	Lahti HS130	Kuopio HS127	Trondheim HS140	Oslo HS134	Planica HS215	Planica HS215						142
2012/13	34	45	22	30	17	9	17	26	28	36	42	44	32	23	18	32	28	30	34	31	–	47	24	17	20	35	21						142
2013/14	Klingenthal HS140	Kuusamo HS142	Lillehammer HS100	Lillehammer HS138	Titisee-Neustadt HS142	Titisee-Neustadt HS142	Engelberg HS137	Engelberg HS137	Oberstdorf HS137	Garmisch-Partenkirchen HS140	Innsbruck HS130	Bischofshofen HS140	Tauplitz HS200	Tauplitz HS200	Wisła HS134	Zakopane HS134	Sapporo HS134	Sapporo HS134	Willingen HS145	Willingen HS145	Falun HS134	Lahti HS130	Lahti HS130	Kuopio HS127	Trondheim HS140	Oslo HS134	Planica HS139	Planica HS139					87
2013/14	22	30	q	31	17	42	17	17	–	–	47	35	q	33	28	38	–	–	34	22	24	20	26	35	31	35	38	41					87
2014/15	Klingenthal HS140	Kuusamo HS142	Kuusamo HS142	Lillehammer HS138	Lillehammer HS138	Nizhny Tagil HS134	Nizhny Tagil HS134	Engelberg HS137	Engelberg HS137	Oberstdorf HS137	Garmisch-Partenkirchen HS140	Innsbruck HS130	Bischofshofen HS140	Tauplitz HS225	Wisła HS134	Zakopane HS134	Sapporo HS134	Sapporo HS134	Willingen HS145	Willingen HS145	Titisee-Neustadt HS142	Titisee-Neustadt HS142	Vikersund HS225	Vikersund HS225	Lahti HS130	Kuopio HS100	Trondheim HS140	Oslo HS134	Oslo HS134	Planica HS225	Planica HS225		35
2014/15	33	44	38	q	35	23	54	28	q	40	38	22	31	–	16	40	36	35	–	–	–	31	–	–	–	–	–	–	–	40	–		35
2015/16	Klingenthal HS140	Lillehammer HS100	Lillehammer HS100	Nizhny Tagil HS134	Nizhny Tagil HS134	Engelberg HS137	Engelberg HS137	Oberstdorf HS137	Garmisch-Partenkirchen HS140	Innsbruck HS130	Bischofshofen HS140	Willingen HS145	Zakopane HS134	Sapporo HS134	Sapporo HS134	Trondheim HS140	Vikersund HS225	Vikersund HS225	Vikersund HS225	Lahti HS130	Lahti HS100	Kuopio HS127	Almaty HS140	Almaty HS140	Wisła HS134	Titisee-Neustadt HS142	Planica HS225	Planica HS225	Planica HS225				182
2015/16	33	56	36	25	21	35	34	–	31	24	46	–	16	25	32	13	23	22	32	27	11	7	30	25	20	27	39	24	23				182
2016/17	Kuusamo HS142	Kuusamo HS142	Klingenthal HS140	Lillehammer HS138	Lillehammer HS138	Engelberg HS140	Engelberg HS140	Oberstdorf HS137	Garmisch-Partenkirchen HS140	Innsbruck HS130	Bischofshofen HS140	Wisła HS134	Wisła HS134	Zakopane HS134	Willingen HS145	Oberstdorf HS225	Oberstdorf HS225	Sapporo HS137	Sapporo HS137	Pyeongchang HS140	Pyeongchang HS109	Oslo HS134	Trondheim HS140	Vikersund HS225	Planica HS225	Planica HS225							345
2016/17	16	14	13	13	14	22	18	16	20	17	18	21	36	8	14	28	17	23	35	19	8	23	37	17	23	15							345
2017/18	Wisła HS134	Kuusamo HS142	Nizhny Tagil HS134	Nizhny Tagil HS134	Titisee-Neustadt HS142	Engelberg HS140	Engelberg HS140	Oberstdorf HS137	Garmisch-Partenkirchen HS140	Innsbruck HS130	Bischofshofen HS140	Tauplitz HS235	Zakopane HS140	Willingen HS145	Willingen HS145	Lahti HS130	Oslo HS134	Lillehammer HS140	Trondheim HS140	Vikersund HS240	Planica HS240	Planica HS240											633
2017/18	10	8	11	19	11	8	20	3	12	20	9	33	7	3	7	4	26	2	9	16	9	21											633
2018/19	Wisła HS134	Kuusamo HS142	Kuusamo HS142	Nizhny Tagil HS134	Nizhny Tagil HS134	Engelberg HS140	Engelberg HS140	Oberstdorf HS137	Garmisch-Partenkirchen HS142	Innsbruck HS130	Bischofshofen HS142	Predazzo HS135	Predazzo HS135	Zakopane HS140	Sapporo HS137	Sapporo HS137	Oberstdorf HS235	Oberstdorf HS235	Oberstdorf HS235	Lahti HS130	Willingen HS145	Willingen HS145	Oslo HS134	Lillehammer HS140	Trondheim HS138	Vikersund HS240	Planica HS240	Planica HS240					988
2018/19	8	35	12	20	11	13	5	5	3	18	2	2	1	12	15	12	2	22	3	28	5	5	24	8	18	10	7	6					988
2019/20	Wisła HS134	Kuusamo HS142	Nizhny Tagil HS134	Nizhny Tagil HS134	Klingenthal HS140	Engelberg HS140	Engelberg HS140	Oberstdorf HS137	Garmisch-Partenkirchen HS142	Innsbruck HS130	Bischofshofen HS142	Predazzo HS104	Predazzo HS104	Titisee-Neustadt HS142	Titisee-Neustadt HS142	Zakopane HS140	Sapporo HS137	Sapporo HS137	Willingen HS145	Tauplitz HS235	Tauplitz HS235	Râșnov HS97	Râșnov HS97	Lahti HS130	Lahti HS130	Lillehammer HS140	Lillehammer HS140						1169
2019/20	7	12	5	17	14	22	47	3	3	2	1	3	3	1	1	3	3	6	15	5	32	8	4	6	11	25	8						1169
2020/21	Wisła HS134	Kuusamo HS142	Kuusamo HS142	Nizhny Tagil HS134	Nizhny Tagil HS134	Engelberg HS140	Engelberg HS140	Oberstdorf HS137	Garmisch-Partenkirchen HS142	Innsbruck HS130	Bischofshofen HS142	Titisee-Neustadt HS142	Titisee-Neustadt HS142	Zakopane HS140	Lahti HS130	Willingen HS147	Willingen HS147	Klingenthal HS140	Klingenthal HS140	Zakopane HS140	Zakopane HS140	Râșnov HS97	Planica HS240	Planica HS240	Planica HS240								786
2020/21	11	3	3	–	–	9	8	15	1	3	15	7	6	15	23	5	10	6	7	11	6	4	31	16	18								786
2021/22	Nizhny Tagil HS134	Nizhny Tagil HS134	Kuusamo HS142	Kuusamo HS142	Wisła HS134	Klingenthal HS140	Klingenthal HS140	Engelberg HS140	Engelberg HS140	Oberstdorf HS137	Garmisch-Partenkirchen HS142	Bischofshofen HS142	Bischofshofen HS142	Bischofshofen HS142	Zakopane HS140	Titisee-Neustadt HS142	Titisee-Neustadt HS142	Willingen HS147	Willingen HS147	Lahti HS130	Lahti HS130	Lillehammer HS140	Oslo HS134	Oslo HS134	Oberstdorf HS235	Oberstdorf HS235	Planica HS240	Planica HS240					231
2021/22	13	35	33	44	32	–	–	48	42	28	39	21	27	27	–	–	–	27	14	13	7	15	18	33	18	7	26	9					231
2022/23	Wisła HS134	Wisła HS134	Kuusamo HS142	Kuusamo HS142	Titisee-Neustadt HS142	Titisee-Neustadt HS142	Engelberg HS140	Engelberg HS140	Oberstdorf HS137	Garmisch-Partenkirchen HS142	Innsbruck HS130	Bischofshofen HS142	Zakopane HS140	Sapporo HS137	Sapporo HS137	Sapporo HS137	Tauplitz HS235	Tauplitz HS235	Willingen HS147	Willingen HS147	Lake Placid	Lake Placid	Râșnov	Oslo	Oslo	Lillehammer	Lillehammer	Vikersund	Vikersund	Lahti	Planica	Planica	1592
2022/23	1	1	4	6	2	1	2	1	3	3	1	3	2	2	4	11	10	17	3	17	5	7	–	9	3	19	1	8	–	–	–	–	1592

=== Victories ===
	Day	Year	Location	Hill	Point K	HS	Jump 1	Jump 2	Note (points)
1.	13 January	2019	Predazzo	Trampolino Giuseppe Dal Ben	K-120	HS-135	129.5 m	131.5 m	271.1
2.	6 January	2020	Bischofshofen	Paul-Ausserleitner-Schanze	K-125	HS-142	143.0 m	140.5 m	300.9
3.	18 January	2020	Titisee-Neustadt	Hochfirstschanze	K-125	HS-142	140.5 m	141.0 m	290.1
4.	19 January	2020	Titisee-Neustadt	Hochfirstschanze	K-125	HS-142	143.0 m	133.5 m	283.3
5.	1 January	2021	Garmisch-Partenkirchen	Große Olympiaschanze	K-125	HS-142	139.0 m	144.0 m	282.1
6.	5 November	2022	Wisła	Malinka	K-120	HS-134	130.5 m	132.5 m	272.2
7.	6 November	2022	Wisła	Malinka	K-120	HS-134	131.0 m	133.5 m	287.0
8.	11 December	2022	Titisee-Neustadt	Hochfirstschanze	K-125	HS-142	139.5 m	143.0 m	309.7
9.	18 December	2022	Engelberg	Gross-Titlis-Schanze	K-125	HS-140	141.5 m	135.5 m	300.4
10.	4 January	2023	Innsbruck	Bergiselschanze	K-120	HS-128	127.0 m	121.5 m	265.2
11.	16 March	2023	Lillehammer	Lysgårdsbakken	K-123	HS-140	137.5 m	138.5 m	283.1

=== Individual podiums ===
	Day	Year	Location	Hill	Point K	HS	Jump 1	Jump 2	Note (points)	Place	Lost (points)	Winner
1.	30 December	2017	Oberstdorf	Schattenbergschanze	K-120	HS-137	126.5 m	129.0 m	270.1	3.	9.6	Kamil Stoch
2.	3 February	2018	Willingen	Mühlenkopfschanze	K-130	HS-145	145.0 m	139.5 m	254.8	3.	6.5	Daniel Andre Tande
3.	13 March	2018	Lillehammer	Lysgårdsbakken	K-123	HS-140	139.0 m	140.5 m	278.7	2.	27.7	Kamil Stoch
4.	1 January	2019	Garmisch-Partenkirchen	Große Olympiaschanze	K-125	HS-142	133.5 m	133.0 m	256.2	3.	10.4	Ryōyū Kobayashi
5.	4 January	2019	Bischofshofen	Paul-Ausserleitner-Schanze	K-125	HS-142	138.0 m	130.0 m	268.3	2.	13.8	Ryōyū Kobayashi
6.	12 January	2019	Predazzo	Trampolino Dal Ben	K-120	HS-135	122.0 m	131.5 m	288.5	2.	26.5	Ryōyū Kobayashi
7.	13 January	2019	Predazzo	Trampolino Dal Ben	K-120	HS-135	129.5 m	131.5 m	271.1	1.	–	–
8.	1 February	2019	Oberstdorf	Heini-Klopfer-Skiflugschanze	K-200	HS-235	221.5 m	218.0 m	424.8	2.	5.3	Timi Zajc
9.	3 February	2019	Oberstdorf	Heini-Klopfer-Skiflugschanze	K-200	HS-235	207.0 m	228.5 m	405.4	3.	7.8	Kamil Stoch
10.	29 December	2019	Oberstdorf	Schattenbergschanze	K-120	HS-137	132.0 m	133.0 m	294.7	3.	10.4	Ryōyū Kobayashi
11.	1 January	2020	Garmisch-Partenkirchen	Große Olympiaschanze	K-125	HS-142	137.0 m	139.5 m	284.0	3.	5.8	Marius Lindvik
12.	4 January	2020	Innsbruck	Bergiselschanze	K-120	HS-130	133.0 m	120.5 m	252.0	2.	1.3	Marius Lindvik
13.	6 January	2020	Bischofshofen	Paul-Ausserleitner-Schanze	K-125	HS-142	143.0 m	140.5 m	300.9	1.	–	–
14.	11 January	2020	Predazzo	Trampolino Giuseppe Dal Ben	K-95	HS-104	98.5 m	104.0 m	279.9	3.	14.7	Karl Geiger
15.	12 January	2020	Predazzo	Trampolino Giuseppe Dal Ben	K-95	HS-104	102.5 m	101.0 m	278.2	3.	7.0	Karl Geiger
16.	18 January	2020	Titisee-Neustadt	Hochfirstschanze	K-125	HS-142	140.5 m	141.0 m	290.1	1.	–	–
17.	19 January	2020	Titisee-Neustadt	Hochfirstschanze	K-125	HS-142	143.0 m	133.5 m	283.3	1.	–	–
18.	26 January	2020	Zakopane	Wielka Krokiew	K-125	HS-140	140.0 m	133.0 m	287.8	3.	7.9	Kamil Stoch
19.	1 February	2020	Sapporo	Ōkurayama	K-123	HS-137	136.0 m	126.0 m	229.5	3.	14.8	Yukiya Satō
20.	28 November	2020	Kuusamo	Rukatunturi	K-120	HS-142	139.0 m	132.5 m	293.9	3.	19.5	Markus Eisenbichler
21.	29 November	2020	Kuusamo	Rukatunturi	K-120	HS-142	132.0 m	139.0 m	265.6	3.	16.4	Halvor Egner Granerud
22.	1 January	2021	Garmisch-Partenkirchen	Große Olympiaschanze	K-125	HS-142	139.0 m	144.0 m	282.1	1.	–	–
23.	3 January	2021	Innsbruck	Bergiselschanze	K-120	HS-128	126.0 m	127.0 m	248.3	3.	13.3	Kamil Stoch
24.	5 November	2022	Wisła	Malinka	K-120	HS-134	130.5 m	132.5 m	272.2	1.	–	–
25.	6 November	2022	Wisła	Malinka	K-120	HS-134	131.0 m	133.5 m	287.0	1.	–	–
26.	9 December	2022	Titisee-Neustadt	Hochfirstschanze	K-125	HS-142	130.5 m	144.0 m	271.5	2.	1.3	Anže Lanišek
27.	11 December	2022	Titisee-Neustadt	Hochfirstschanze	K-125	HS-142	139.5 m	143.0 m	309.7	1.	–	–
28.	17 December	2022	Engelberg	Gross-Titlis-Schanze	K-125	HS-140	139.0 m	140.0 m	317.0	2.	3.3	Anže Lanišek
29.	18 December	2022	Engelberg	Gross-Titlis-Schanze	K-125	HS-140	141.5 m	135.5 m	300.4	1.	–	–
30.	29 December	2022	Oberstdorf	Schattenbergschanze	K-120	HS-137	140.5 m	136.0 m	294.9	3.	17.5	Halvor Egner Granerud
31.	1 January	2023	Garmisch-Partenkirchen	Große Olympiaschanze	K-125	HS-142	136.0 m	138.5 m	294.4	3.	9.3	Halvor Egner Granerud
32.	4 January	2023	Innsbruck	Bergiselschanze	K-120	HS-128	127.0 m	121.5 m	265.2	1.	–	–
33.	6 January	2023	Bischofshofen	Paul-Ausserleitner-Schanze	K-125	HS-142	135.5 m	140.0 m	303.7	3.	9.7	Halvor Egner Granerud
34.	15 January	2023	Zakopane	Wielka Krokiew	K-125	HS-140	137.5 m	124.0 m	286.6	2.	1.1	Halvor Egner Granerud
35.	20 January	2023	Sapporo	Ōkurayama	K-123	HS-137	137.0 m	125.5 m	264.3	2.	7.2	Ryōyū Kobayashi
36.	4 February	2023	Willingen	Mühlenkopfschanze	K-130	HS-147	147.0 m	137.0 m	281.3	3.	15.3	Halvor Egner Granerud
37.	12 March	2023	Oslo	Holmenkollbakken	K-120	HS-134	127.0 m	130.0 m	257.7	3.	8.4	Stefan Kraft
38.	16 March	2023	Lillehammer	Lysgårdsbakken	K-123	HS-140	137.5 m	138.5 m	283.1	1.	–	–

=== Team victories ===
	Day	Year	Location	Hill	Point K	HS	Jump 1	Jump 2	Note (points)
1.	3 December	2016	Klingenthal	Vogtlandarena	K-125	HS-140	132.5 m	134.5 m	1128.7 (268.3)
2.	28 January	2017	Willingen	Mühlenkopfschanze	K-130	HS-145	134.0 m	137.5 m	931.5 (220.6)
3.	27 January	2018	Zakopane	Wielka Krokiew	K-125	HS-140	128.5 m	133.0 m	1092.0 (260.1)
4.	17 November	2018	Wisła	Malinka	K-120	HS-134	127.0 m	114.5 m	1026.6 (242.1)
5.	15 February	2019	Willingen	Mühlenkopfschanze	K-130	HS-145	120.5 m	135.0 m	979.4 (228.0)
6.	23 March	2019	Planica	Letalnica	K-200	HS-240	229.5 m	230.0 m	1627.9 (395.2)
7.	14 December	2019	Klingenthal	Vogtlandarena	K-125	HS-140	133.5 m	137.0 m	968.7 (254.2)

== State awards ==
- 2017 Honorary Badge of Lesser Poland Voivodeship – Cross of Małopolska
- 2019 Knight's Cross of Polonia Restituta
