= Malinka (ski jumping hill) =

Ski jumping hill in Wisła, Poland

Coordinates: 49°37′42″N 18°54′54″E

- Skocznia narciarska im. Adama Małysza
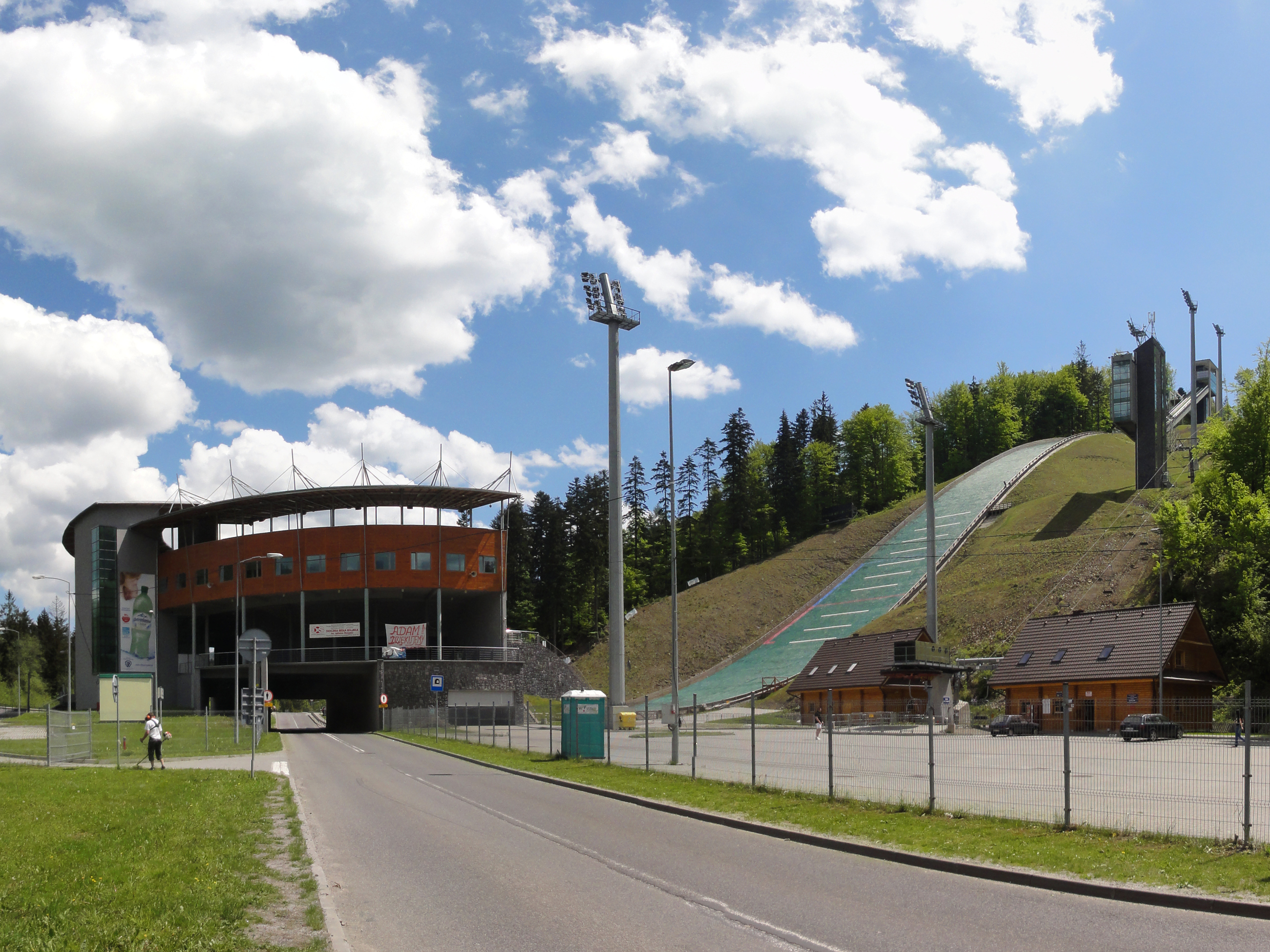
- Location: Wisła, Poland
- Opened: 1933
- Renovated: 1954, 1970, 2003-2008

Size
- K–point: 120 metres (394 ft)
- Hill size: 134 metres (440 ft)
- Hill record: 144.5 m (474 ft) (Germany) Andreas Wellinger (13 January 2024)

Adam Małysz Ski Jumping Hill in Wisła-Malinka is a ski jumping hill in Wisła, Poland.

== History ==
This venue hosts competitions of FIS Ski Jumping Continental Cup, FIS Ski Jumping Grand Prix and FIS Ski Jumping World Cup. Before the last renovation (2004-2008) this ski jump hosted only local events. Since 2010 the HS 134 in Wisła has been annual host of summer Grand Prix events. The first World Cup competition on Adam Małysz ski jump took place on January 9, 2013. Norway's Anders Bardal won the first place and Austria's Stefan Kraft set up a hill record of 139 meters during qualification.

Very special of the new built Malinka ski jumping hill is the road, which had to be barricade during training jumps on the old hill and no leading through a tunnel below the artificial hill in the outrun. Above this street is the main stand which will host 2,500 spectators and official buildings. The facilities are constructed out of stone, wood, glass, aluminium and natural concrete.

== Events ==
=== Men ===
Date	Hillsize	Competition	Winner	Second	Third
(night) 20 August 2010	HS134	SGP	(Poland) Adam Małysz	(Poland) Kamil Stoch	(Japan) Daiki Itō
21 August 2010	HS134	SGP	(Poland) Kamil Stoch	(Japan) Daiki Itō	(Norway) Tom Hilde
17 July 2011	HS134	SGP	(Austria) Thomas Morgenstern	(Russia) Pavel Karelin	(Austria) Gregor Schlierenzauer
(night) 20 July 2012	HS134	SGP-T	Slovenia Jurij Tepeš; Robert Hrgota; Peter Prevc; Robert Kranjec	Poland Piotr Żyła; Kamil Stoch; Dawid Kubacki; Maciej Kot	Germany Andreas Wank; Maximilian Mechler; Michael Neumayer; Richard Freitag
21 July 2012	HS134	SGP	(Poland) Maciej Kot	(Switzerland) Simon Ammann	(Austria) Wolfgang Loitzl
(night) 9 January 2013	HS134	WC	(Norway) Anders Bardal	(Germany) Richard Freitag	(Norway) Rune Velta
(night) 2 August 2013	HS134	SGP-T	Poland Maciej Kot; Krzysztof Biegun; Dawid Kubacki; Kamil Stoch	Germany Severin Freund; Michael Neumayer; Andreas Wellinger; Richard Freitag	Slovenia Robert Kranjec; Peter Prevc; Jaka Hvala; Matjaž Pungertar
3 August 2013	HS134	SGP	(Germany) Andreas Wellinger	(Poland) Maciej Kot	(Czech Republic) Roman Koudelka
(night) 16 January 2014	HS134	WC	(Germany) Andreas Wellinger	(Poland) Kamil Stoch	(Austria) Michael Hayböck
(night) 25 July 2014	HS134	SGP-T	Poland Maciej Kot; Piotr Żyła; Dawid Kubacki; Kamil Stoch	Czech Republic Jakub Janda; Lukáš Hlava; Antonín Hájek; Roman Koudelka	Austria Michael Hayböck; Stefan Kraft; Thomas Diethart; Gregor Schlierenzauer
26 July 2014	HS134	SGP	(Slovenia) Peter Prevc	(Poland) Piotr Żyła	(Germany) Andreas Wellinger
(night) 15 January 2015	HS134	WC	(Austria) Stefan Kraft	(Slovenia) Peter Prevc	(Germany) Severin Freund
(night) 31 July 2015	HS134	SGP-T	Poland Maciej Kot; Piotr Żyła; Dawid Kubacki; Kamil Stoch	Germany Andreas Wank; Stephan Leyhe; Richard Freitag; Andreas Wellinger	Norway Johann André Forfang; Kenneth Gangnes; Phillip Sjøen; Anders Fannemel
(night) 1 August 2015	HS134	SGP	(Poland) Dawid Kubacki	(Poland) Piotr Żyła	(Norway) Kenneth Gangnes
(night) 4 March 2016	HS134	WC	(Czech Republic) Roman Koudelka	(Norway) Kenneth Gangnes	(Japan) Noriaki Kasai
5 March 2016	HS134	WC	strong wind		
(night) 14 January 2017	HS134	WC	(Poland) Kamil Stoch	(Austria) Stefan Kraft	(Germany) Andreas Wellinger
(night) 15 January 2017	HS134	WC	(Poland) Kamil Stoch	(Norway) Daniel-André Tande	(Slovenia) Domen Prevc
14 July 2017	HS134	SGP-T	Poland Piotr Żyła; Kamil Stoch; Dawid Kubacki; Maciej Kot	Norway Anders Fannemel; Robert Johansson; Kenneth Gangnes; Daniel-André Tande	Germany Andreas Wank; Karl Geiger; Andreas Wellinger; Stephan Leyhe
(night) 15 July 2017	HS134	SGP	(Poland) Dawid Kubacki	(Poland) Maciej Kot	(Germany) Karl Geiger
(night) 18 November 2017	HS134	WC-T	Norway Johann André Forfang; Anders Fannemel; Daniel-André Tande; Robert Johansson	Austria Daniel Huber; Clemens Aigner; Michael Hayböck; Stefan Kraft: - - - - - - - - - - - - -; Poland Piotr Żyła; Dawid Kubacki; Maciej Kot; Kamil Stoch	
19 November 2017	HS134	WC	(Japan) Junshirō Kobayashi	(Poland) Kamil Stoch	(Austria) Stefan Kraft
(night) 17 November 2018	HS134	WC-T	Poland Piotr Żyła; Jakub Wolny; Dawid Kubacki; Kamil Stoch	Germany Karl Geiger; Markus Eisenbichler; Stephan Leyhe; Richard Freitag	Austria Michael Hayböck; Clemens Aigner; Daniel Huber; Stefan Kraft
(night) 18 November 2018	HS134	WC	(Russia) Evgeniy Klimov	(Germany) Stephan Leyhe	(Japan) Ryōyū Kobayashi
(night) 23 November 2019	HS134	WC-T	Austria Philipp Aschenwald; Daniel Huber; Jan Hörl; Stefan Kraft	Norway Daniel-André Tande; Thomas Aasen Markeng; Marius Lindvik; Robert Johansson	Poland Piotr Żyła; Jakub Wolny; Kamil Stoch; Dawid Kubacki
24 November 2019	HS134	WC	(Norway) Daniel-André Tande	(Slovenia) Anže Lanišek	(Poland) Kamil Stoch
(night) 21 November 2020	HS134	WC-T	Austria Michael Hayböck; Philipp Aschenwald; Daniel Huber; Stefan Kraft	Germany Constantin Schmid; Pius Paschke; Karl Geiger; Markus Eisenbichler	Poland Piotr Żyła; Klemens Murańka; Dawid Kubacki; Kamil Stoch
(night) 22 November 2020	HS134	WC	(Germany) Markus Eisenbichler	(Germany) Karl Geiger	(Austria) Daniel Huber
