= Mario Innauer =

Austrian ski jumper

Personal information
- Full name: Mario Innauer
- Born: 10 January 1990 (age 36) Graz, Austria

Sport
- Sport: Skiing
- Club: SV Innsbruck-Bergisel

World Cup career
- Seasons: 2007-2013
- Indiv. podiums: 0
- Indiv. wins: 0

Mario Innauer (born 10 January 1990) is an Austrian former ski jumper. He is the son of Olympic gold medalist Toni Innauer.

Mario Innauer's best World Cup result was reached in 2007 in Titisee-Neustadt, where he came in fifth.

After an injury in 2011 he continued to jump into 2013 when he announced his retirement from the sport.
