= Antonín Hájek =

Czech ski jumper (1987–2022)

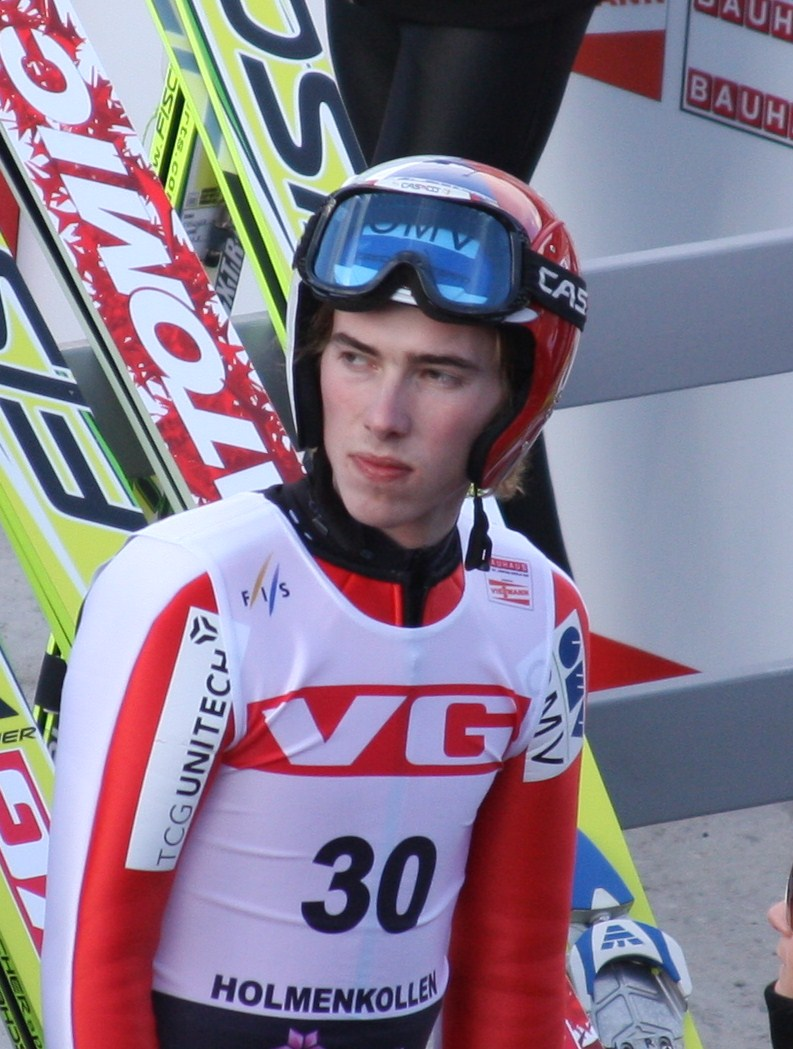

Personal information
- Born: 12 February 1987 Frýdlant, Czechoslovakia
- Died: September 2022 (aged 35) Malaysia
- Occupation: Ski jumping coach
- Years active: 2004–2015; 2016–2022 (coach)

Sport
- Country: Czech Republic
- Sport: ski jumping

Achievements and titles
- Olympic finals: 2010 Winter Olympics; 2014 Winter Olympics

Antonín Hájek (Czech pronunciation: [ˈantoɲiːn ˈɦaːjɛk]; 12 February 1987 – September 2022) was a Czech ski jumper. His specialties included both individual ski jumping and ski flying. Hájek's best result in the World Cup was a fourth place in Tauplitz and Sapporo in 2010. He held the Czech ski jumping distance record at 236 meters.

== Life and career ==
Hájek had an accident in Oberstdorf in 2005, crashing in the trial round; he did not suffer major injuries and walked from the hill by himself.

Hájek was involved in a car accident during the spring of 2008, and barely survived. Four months after the accident he could not walk, ruling out a comeback. But he began to train again in February 2009, and made great progress during the summer of 2009. He staged his comeback in Continental Cup in Rovaniemi in December 2009. His first World Cup competition after his comeback was in Tauplitz on 9 January 2010, and his fourth place score on that day was his best World Cup result. Hájek jumped 236 m at Planica on 20 March 2010 at the ski flying World Championships; this was the third longest jump in ski jumping history at the time. It set the Czech distance record.

Hájek's results from the 2010 Winter Olympics were seventh in both the individual and team large hill events, and 21st in the individual normal hill event. His best finish at the FIS Nordic World Ski Championships was ninth in the team large hill event at Sapporo in 2007.

At the 2014 Winter Olympics, he placed 28th individually.

Hájek retired in September 2015, reportedly after being expelled from the national team.

=== Disappearance and death ===
On 10 March 2023, the Czech Ski Association announced that Hájek had been found dead in Malaysia. It was subsequently confirmed that he went missing in Langkawi, and died in September 2022, at the age of 35.
