= Wisła =

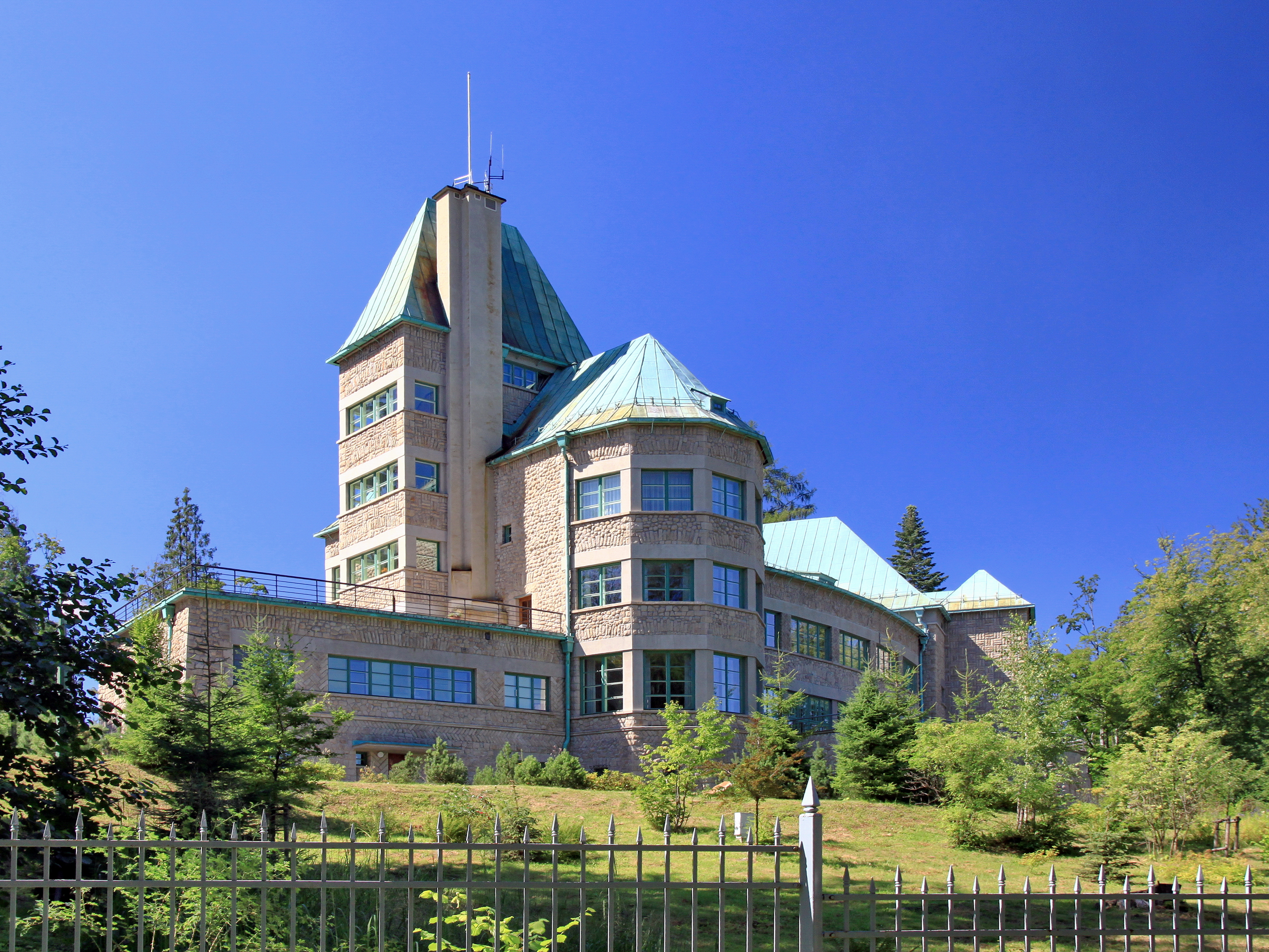
- Presidential Castle in Wisła in August 2013

- Coat of arms
- Interactive map of Wisła
- Location within Poland
- Coordinates: 49°39′03″N 18°52′07″E
- Country: Poland
- Voivodeship: Silesian
- County: Cieszyn
- Gmina: Wisła (urban gmina)
- First mentioned: 1615
- Town rights: 1962

Government
  - Mayor: Tomasz Bujok

Area
  - Total: 110.26 km^{2} (42.57 sq mi)
- Elevation: 513 m (1,683 ft)

Population (2019-06-30)
  - Total: 11,132
  - Density: 100.96/km^{2} (261.49/sq mi)
- Time zone: UTC+1 (CET)
  - Summer (DST): UTC+2 (CEST)
- Postal code: 43-460
- Car plates: SCI
- Website: www.wisla.pl

Wisła (Polish: [ˈviswa]; Czech: Visla; Silesian: Wistula; German: Weichsel [ˈvaɪksl̩]) is a town in Cieszyn County, Silesian Voivodeship, southern Poland, with a population of about 11,132 (2019), near the border with the Czech Republic. It is situated in the Silesian Beskids mountain range in the historical region of Cieszyn Silesia and ethnic region of the Silesian Gorals. Wisła is the Polish name for the Vistula River, which has its source in the mountains near the town.

It is the only town in Poland with a majority Lutheran population (as of 2006 roughly two-thirds of the population were Protestant, which is a drop from 94,4% in 1900).

Wisła is a popular year-round tourist destination, being home to Malinka, a ski jumping hill. It is also known for being the home town of ski jumper Adam Małysz. Wisła is also the home of the Beskid Museum displaying agricultural tools, folk costumes and goatskin bagpipes from the surrounding region.

== History ==
The first people to settle in Wisła in the late 16th or early 17th century came from two directions: from Ustroń up the river Vistula and Gorals searching for new pastures in the mountains (see also: Vlachs). It was first mentioned in 1615. Politically the village belonged then to the Duchy of Teschen, a fee of the Kingdom of Bohemia, which after 1526 became part of the Habsburg monarchy. It was first recognized as a developed village of the Teschener Kammer, named na Wisłach, in 1643.

The majority of its inhabitants were Lutherans. After issuing the Patent of Toleration in 1781, they subsequently organized a local Lutheran parish as one of over ten in the region.

After Revolutions of 1848 in the Austrian Empire, a modern municipal division was introduced in the re-established Austrian Silesia. The village as a municipality was subscribed to the political district of Bielsko and the legal district of Skoczów. In the second half of the 19th century it became increasingly popular as a tourist destination.

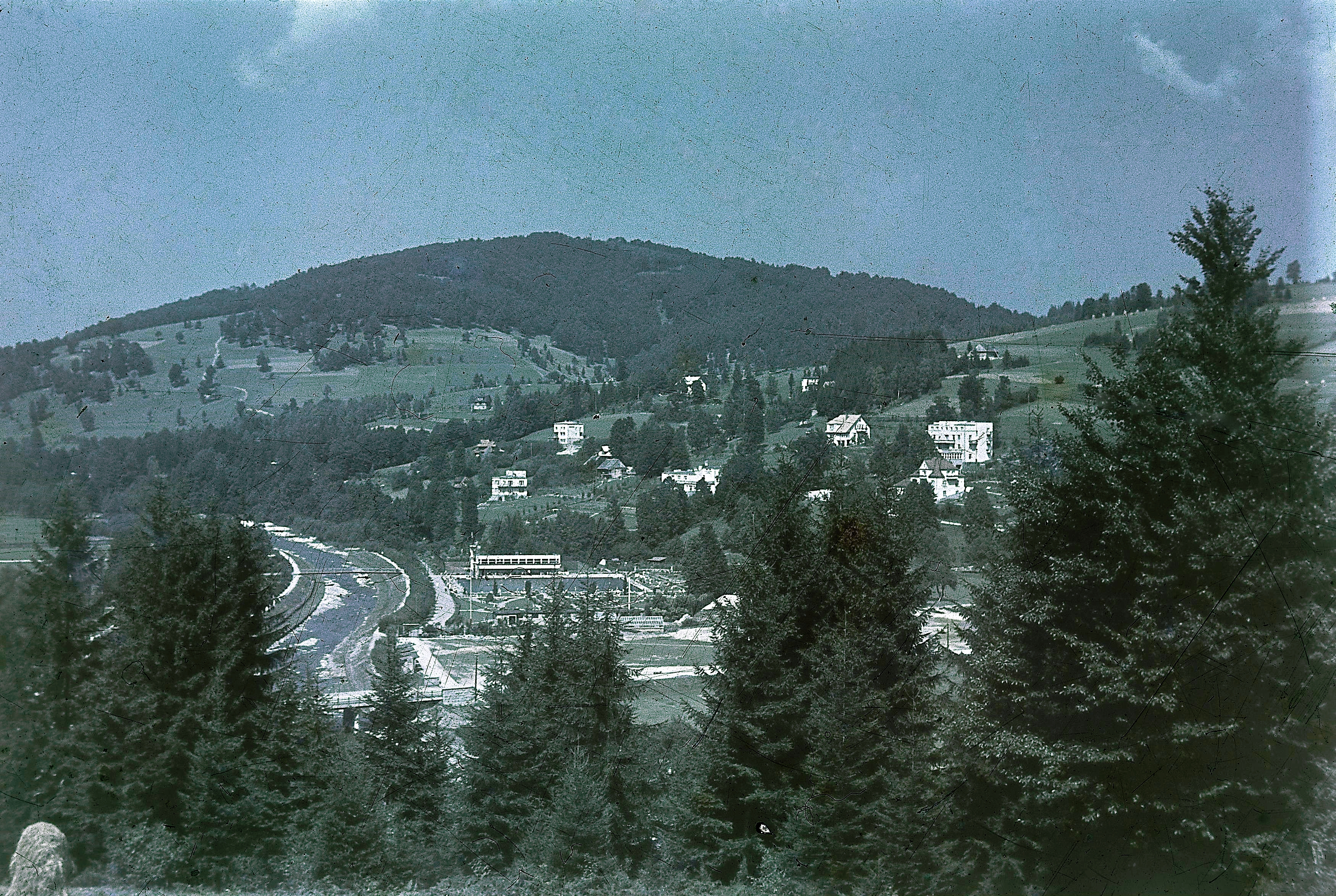
Panorama of Wisła in 1939

According to the censuses conducted in 1880, 1890, 1900 and 1910 the population of the municipality grew from 4261 in 1880 to 4685 in 1910 with a majority being native Polish-speakers (98.5%-99%) and a small minority German-speaking (at most 64 or 1.5% in 1880) and at most 4 people Czech-speaking (in 1910), in terms of religion majority were Protestants (94.9% in 1910), followed by Roman Catholics (232 or 5% in 1910) and 6 Jews. The village was also traditionally inhabited by a specific subgroup of Silesian Gorals, speaking Cieszyn Silesian dialect.

After World War I, fall of Austria-Hungary, Polish–Czechoslovak War and the division of Cieszyn Silesia in 1920, it became a part of Poland. According to the 1921 census, Wisła had a population of 4,225, 99.3% Polish and 0.5% German by ethnicity, and 93.2% Protestant, 5.6% Catholic and 0.1% Jewish by confession.

It was then annexed by Nazi Germany at the beginning of World War II. After the war it was restored to Poland. It gained town rights in 1962.

== Tourism ==
In the winter Wisła is known for its skiing: Malinka, a ski jump hill, is located here and hosts international competitions. In the summer, hiking through its many mountain trails is popular. To support its recent growth in tourism, many hotels have been built, the largest of which is Hotel Gołębiewski.

In Wisła a trail starts that leads to the Stożek Wielki, a mountain on the border with the Czech Republic that reaches a height of 978 meters.

Interesting sights in Wisła are:

- Wisła Castle – one of the official residences of the President of Poland, built in 1929–1930 by Adolf Szyszko-Bohusz
- Lutheran Church – klassicist church from 1838
- Habsburg hunting lodge – originally built on the Przysłop Pass, transferred to Wisła in 1985
- Galeria „Sportowe Trofea Adama Małysza” w Wiśle – museum of Adam Małysz

== Notable residents ==
- Juliusz Bursche (1862–1942), Lutheran bishop
- Adam Małysz (born 1977), ski jumper
- Piotr Żyła (born 1987), ski jumper
- Julian Ochorowicz (1850–1917), philosopher, psychologist, inventor
- Jerzy Pilch (1952–2020), writer and columnist

== Twin towns – sister cities ==
Wisła is twinned with:

- Bully-les-Mines, France
- Čoka, Serbia
- Hukvaldy, Czech Republic
- Nepomuk, Czech Republic
- Rheinhausen, Germany
- Turčianske Teplice, Slovakia

== Gallery ==
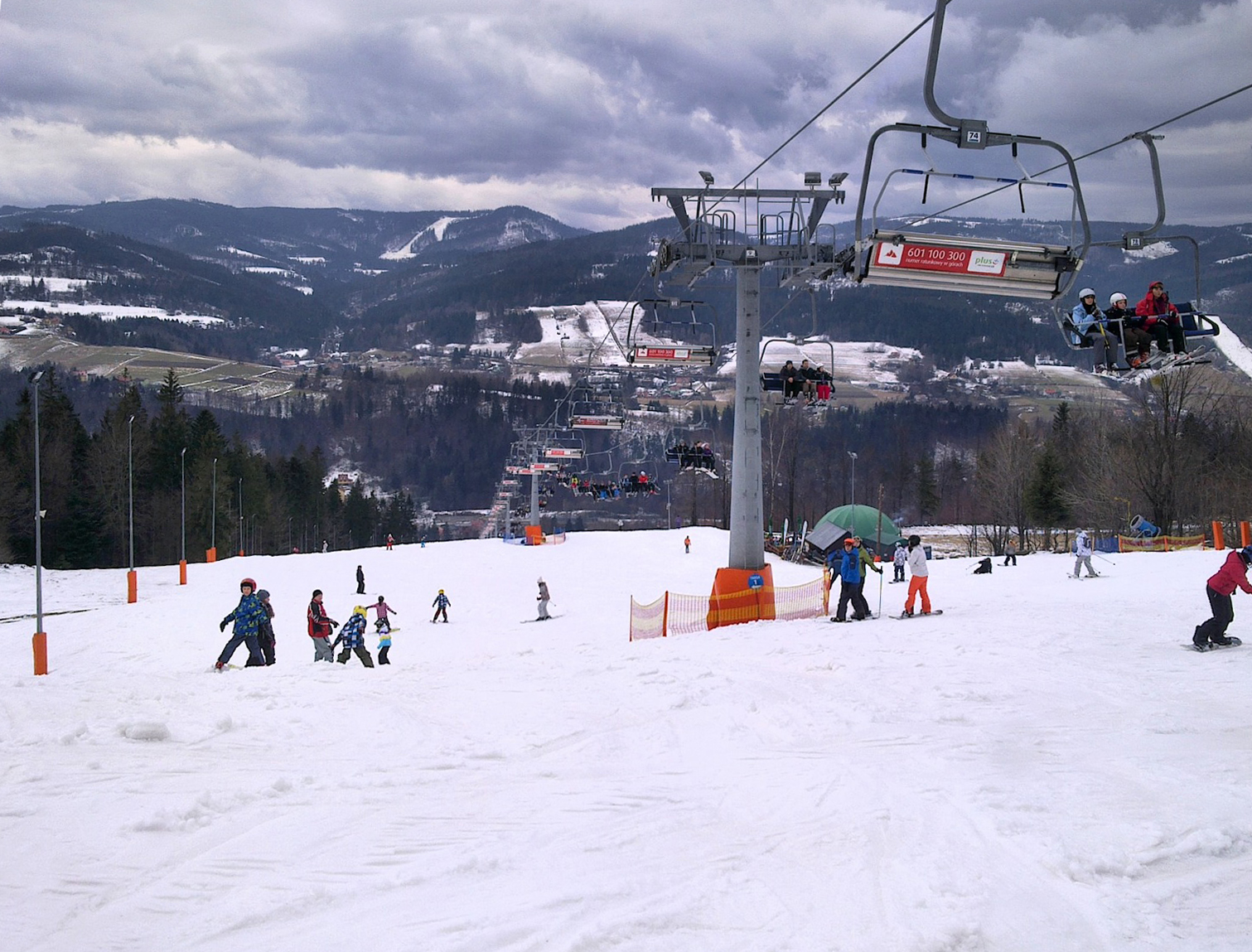
Nowa Osada skiing station

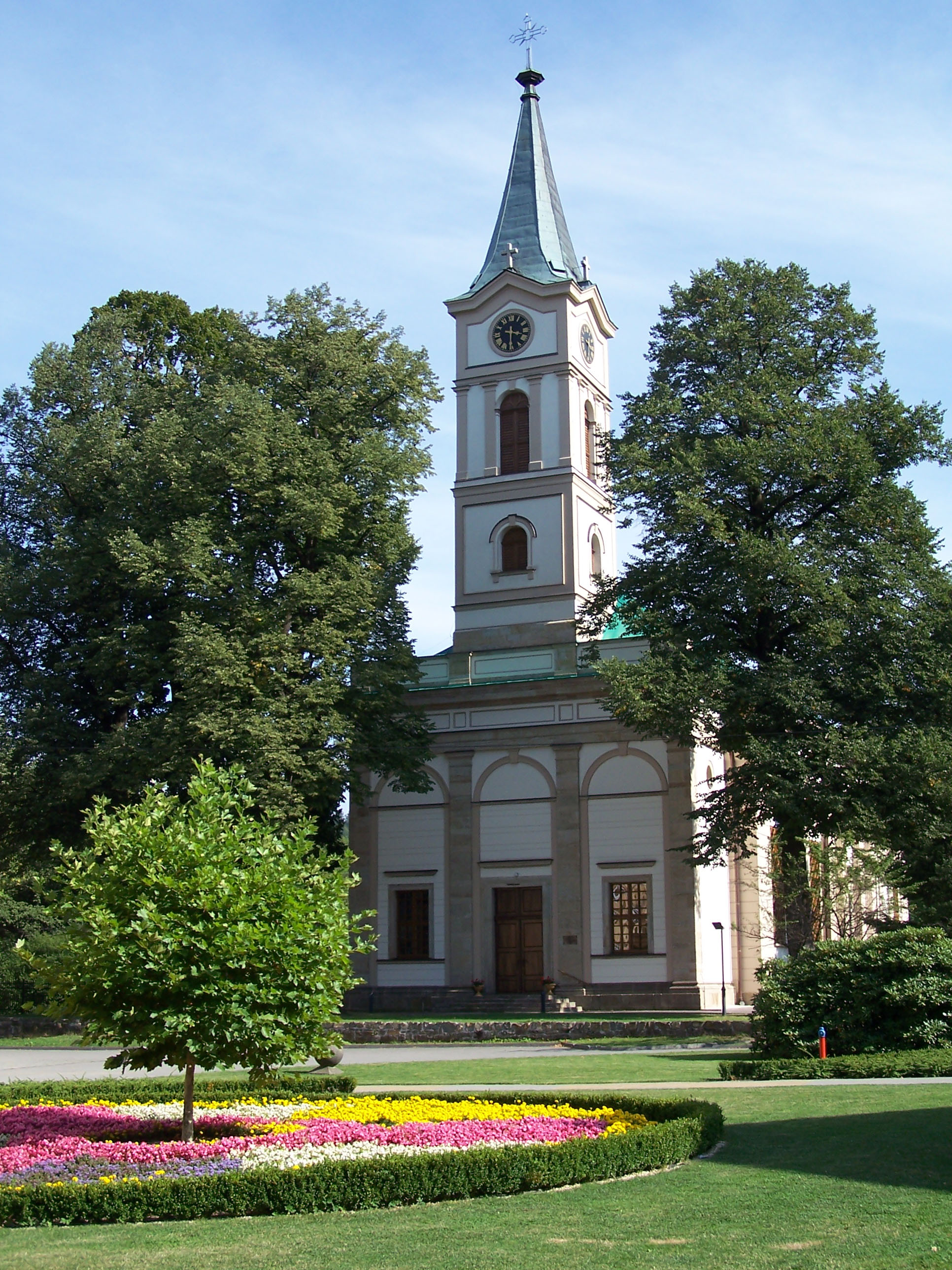
Lutheran church of the Apostles Peter and Paul

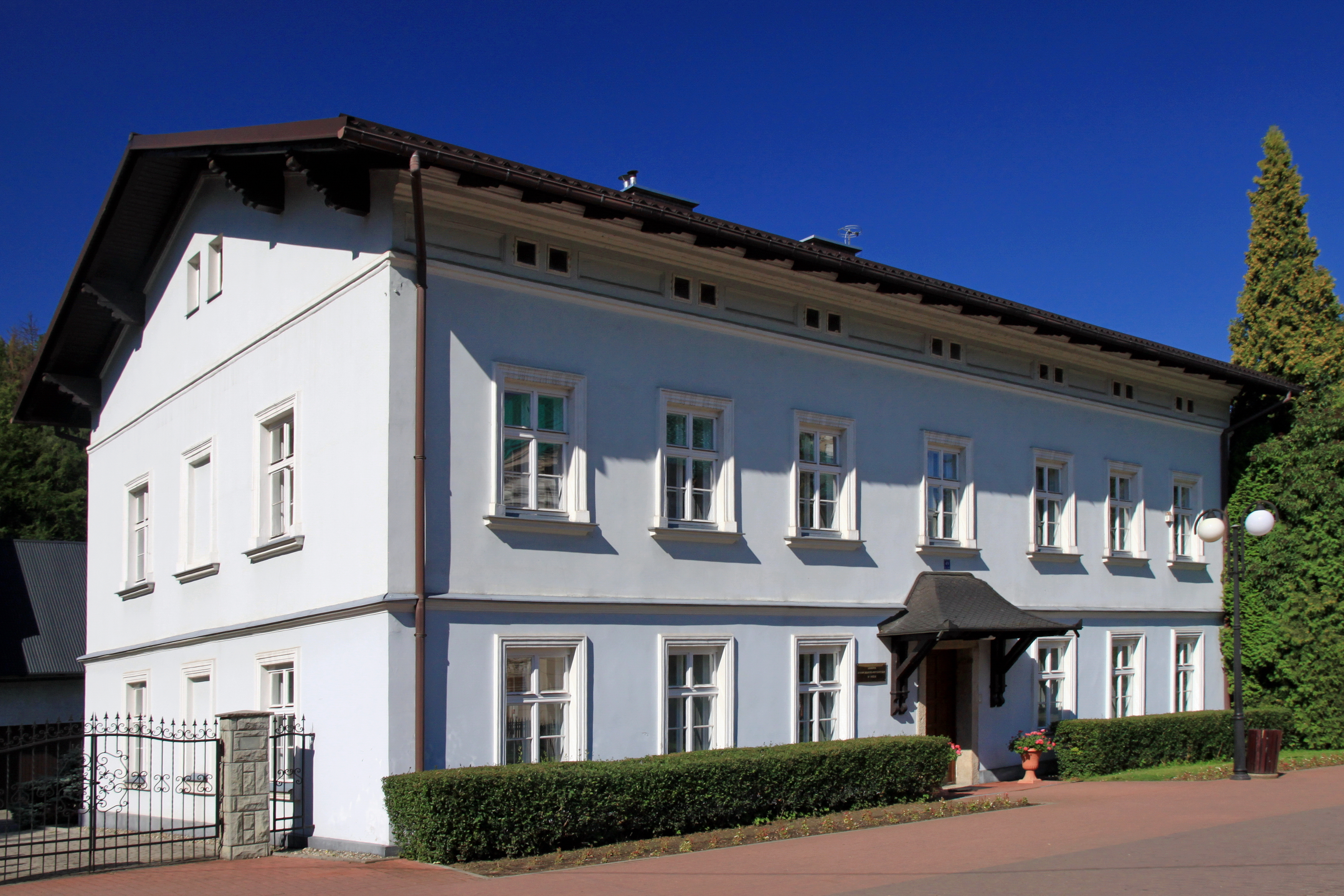
Lutheran rectory

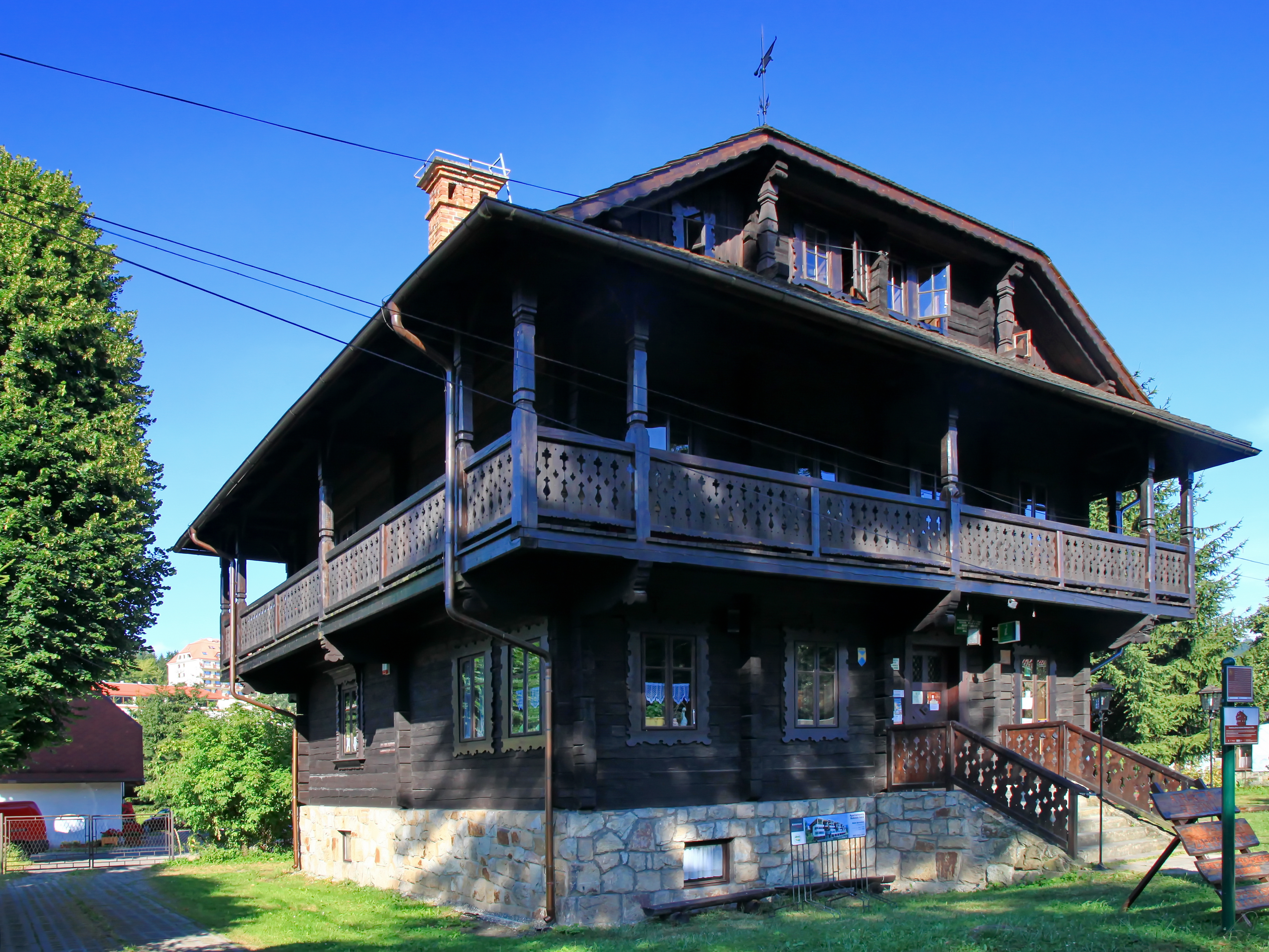
Former Habsburg Hunting Palace

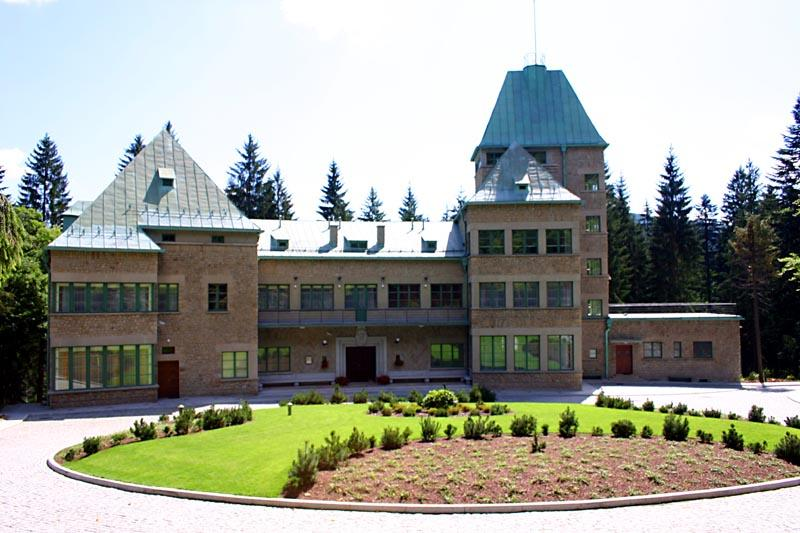
Presidential Castle

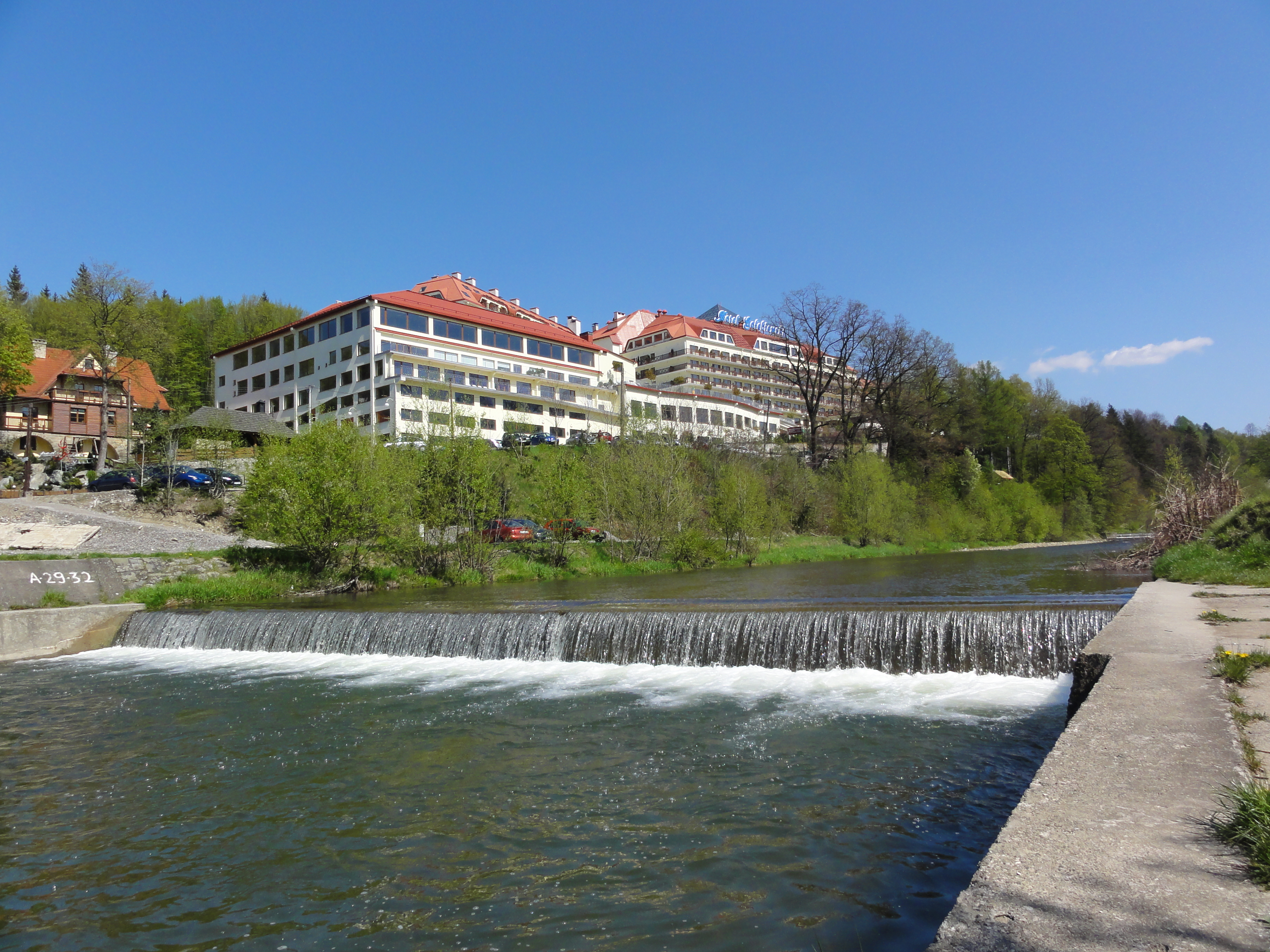
Gołębiewski Hotel

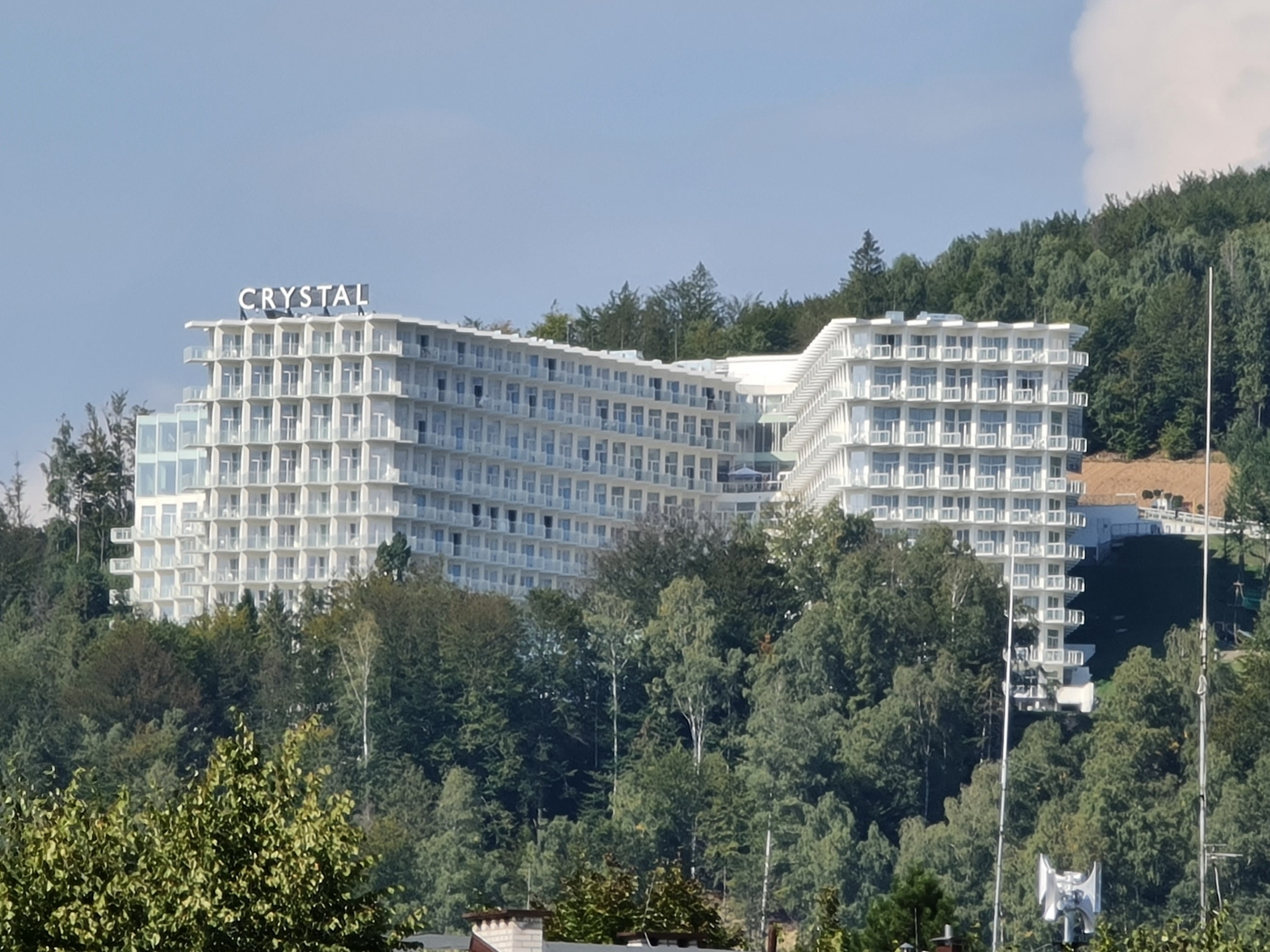
Crystal Mountain Hotel
