= 2015–16 FIS Cup (ski jumping) =

FIS Cup 2015/16
Discipline	Men	Women
Overall	(Germany) Danny Queck	(Poland) Kinga Rajda

Competition
Edition	11th	4th
Locations	12	4
Individual	24	8
Cancelled	6	4
Rescheduled	6	2

The 2015/16 FIS Cup (ski jumping) was the 11th FIS Cup season in ski jumping for men and the 4th for ladies.

Other competitive circuits this season included the World Cup, Grand Prix, Continental Cup, FIS Race and Alpen Cup.

== Calendar ==
=== Men ===
Season	Date	Place	Hill	Size	Winner	Second	Third	Yellow bib	Ref.
1	11 July 2015	(Austria) Villach	Villacher Alpenarena HS98	NH	(Germany) Danny Queck	(Romania) Eduard Torok	(Slovenia) Ernest Prišlič	(Germany) Danny Queck	
2	12 July 2015	(Austria) Villach	Villacher Alpenarena HS98	NH	(Germany) Tim Heinrich	(Austria) Lukas Müller	(Germany) Danny Queck	(Germany) Danny Queck	
3	20 August 2015	(Finland) Kuopio	Puijo HS127	LH	(Slovenia) Andraž Pograjc	(Austria) Florian Altenburger	(Slovenia) Ernest Prišlič	(Germany) Danny Queck	
4	21 August 2015	(Finland) Kuopio	Puijo HS127	LH	(Austria) Florian Altenburger	(Poland) Adam Ruda	(Slovenia) Andraž Pograjc	(Germany) Danny Queck	
5	29 August 2015	(Poland) Szczyrk	Skalite HS106	NH	(Germany) Michael Dreher	(Slovenia) Žiga Jelar	(Poland) Artur Kukuła	(Germany) Danny Queck	
6	30 August 2015	(Poland) Szczyrk	Skalite HS106	NH	(Germany) Michael Dreher	(Germany) Danny Queck	(Poland) Artur Kukuła	(Germany) Danny Queck	
7	12 September 2015	(Switzerland) Einsiedeln	Andreas Küttel Schanze HS117	LH	(Austria) Simon Greiderer	(Poland) Andrzej Stękała	(Germany) Adrian Sell	(Germany) Danny Queck	
8	13 September 2015	(Switzerland) Einsiedeln	Andreas Küttel Schanze HS117	LH	(Switzerland) Killian Peier	(Poland) Krzysztof Leja	(Slovenia) Tilen Bartol	(Germany) Danny Queck	
9	26 September 2015	(Romania) Râșnov	Trambulina Valea Cărbunării HS100	NH	(Slovenia) Jure Šinkovec	(Germany) Tim Fuchs	(Germany) David Siegel	(Germany) Danny Queck	
10	27 September 2015	(Romania) Râșnov	Trambulina Valea Cărbunării HS100	NH	(Poland) Andrzej Stękała	(Slovenia) Jure Šinkovec	(Germany) Tim Fuchs	(Germany) Danny Queck	
11	10 December 2015	(Norway) Notodden	Tveitanbakken HS100	NH	(Germany) Michael Dreher	(Germany) Martin Hamann	(Germany) Danny Queck	(Germany) Danny Queck	
12	11 December 2015	(Norway) Notodden	Tveitanbakken HS100	NH	(Germany) Danny Queck	(Slovenia) Miran Zupančič	(Norway) Robin Pedersen	(Germany) Danny Queck	
	18 December 2015	(Czech Republic) Harrachov	Čerťák HS100	NH	postponed to end of season				
	19 December 2015	(Czech Republic) Harrachov	Čerťák HS 100	NH	postponed to end of season				
13	16 January 2016	(Poland) Zakopane	Wielka Krokiew HS134	LH	(Austria) Stefan Huber	(Austria) Thomas Diethart	(Austria) Ulrich Wolgennant	(Germany) Danny Queck	
14	17 January 2016	(Poland) Zakopane	Wielka Krokiew HS134	LH	(Austria) Daniel Huber	(Austria) Ulrich Wolgennant	(Slovenia) Jure Šinkovec	(Germany) Danny Queck	
15	23 January 2016	(South Korea) Pyeongchang	Alpensia HS109	NH	(South Korea) Heung-chul Choi	(South Korea) Seu Choi	(Slovenia) Rok Justin	(Germany) Danny Queck	
16	24 January 2016	(South Korea) Pyeongchang	Alpensia HS109	NH	(Slovenia) Rok Justin	(Japan) Yuya Yamada	(Japan) Takehiro Nagai	(Germany) Danny Queck	
	6 February 2016	(Canada) Calgary	Canada Olympic Park HS 99	NH	replaced in Whistler				
	7 February 2016	(Canada) Calgary	Canada Olympic Park HS 99	NH	replaced in Whistler				
17	6 February 2016	(Canada) Whistler	Whistler Olympic Park HS106	NH	(Poland) Jakub Kot	(United States) A. J. Brown	(Canada) Joshua Maurer	(Germany) Danny Queck	
18	7 February 2016	(Canada) Whistler	Whistler Olympic Park HS106	NH	(Poland) Jakub Kot	(United States) A. J. Brown	(Norway) Stian Andre Skinnes	(Germany) Danny Queck	
19	12 February 2016	(United States) Eau Claire	Silver Mine Hill HS95	NH	(Austria) Daniel Huber	(Austria) Stefan Huber	(United States) Christian Friberg	(Germany) Danny Queck	
20	13 February 2016	(United States) Eau Claire	Silver Mine Hill HS95	NH	(Austria) Stefan Huber	(United States) Christian Friberg	(Austria) Daniel Huber	(Germany) Danny Queck	
	4 March 2016	(Slovenia) Kranj	Bauhenk HS 109	NH	rescheduled to Planica				
	5 March 2016	(Slovenia) Kranj	Bauhenk HS109	NH	rescheduled to Planica				
21	5 March 2016	(Slovenia) Planica	Normal hill HS104	NH	(Slovenia) Miha Kveder	(Slovenia) Mitja Mežnar	(Kazakhstan) Sabirzhan Muninov	(Germany) Danny Queck	
22	6 March 2016	(Slovenia) Planica	Normal hill HS104	NH	(Germany) Danny Queck	(Slovenia) Anže Lavtižar	(Slovenia) Žiga Jelar	(Germany) Danny Queck	
23	11 March 2016	(Czech Republic) Harrachov	Čerťák HS100	NH	(Austria) Simon Greiderer	(Austria) Mika Schwann	(Germany) Danny Queck	(Germany) Danny Queck	
24	12 March 2016	(Czech Republic) Harrachov	Čerťák HS100	NH	(Germany) Danny Queck	(Austria) Lucas Schaffer	(Slovenia) Žiga Jelar	(Germany) Danny Queck	

=== Ladies ===
Season	Date	Place	Hill	Size	Winner	Second	Third	Yellow bib	Ref.
1	11 July 2015	(Austria) Villach	Villacher Alpenarena HS98	NH	(Austria) Jacqueline Seifriedsberger	(Germany) Luisa Görlich	(Slovenia) Urša Bogataj	(Austria) Jacqueline Seifriedsberger	
2	12 July 2015	(Austria) Villach	Villacher Alpenarena HS98	NH	(Austria) Jacqueline Seifriedsberger	(Slovenia) Urša Bogataj	(Germany) Luisa Görlich (Slovenia) Ema Klinec	(Austria) Jacqueline Seifriedsberger	
3	29 August 2015	(Poland) Szczyrk	Skalite HS106	NH	(Poland) Kinga Rajda	(Germany) Arantxa Lancho	(Poland) Magdalena Palasz	(Austria) Jacqueline Seifriedsberger	
4	30 August 2015	(Poland) Szczyrk	Skalite HS106	NH	(Romania) Daniela Haralambie	(Germany) Arantxa Lancho	(Poland) Kinga Rajda	(Austria) Jacqueline Seifriedsberger	
5	26 September 2015	(Romania) Râșnov	Trambulina Valea Cărbunării HS100	MH	(Romania) Daniela Haralambie	(Austria) Linda Grabner	(Poland) Kinga Rajda	(Poland) Kinga Rajda	
6	27 September 2015	(Romania) Râșnov	Trambulina Valea Cărbunării HS100	MH	(Romania) Daniela Haralambie	(Austria) Linda Grabner	(Poland) Kinga Rajda	(Romania) Daniela Haralambie	
	18 December 2015	(Czech Republic) Harrachov	Čerťák HS 100	NH	postponed to end of season				
	19 December 2015	(Czech Republic) Harrachov	Čerťák HS 100	NH	postponed to end of season				
	23 January 2016	(South Korea) Pyeongchang	Alpensia HS109	NH	cancelled				
	24 January 2016	(South Korea) Pyeongchang	Alpensia HS109	NH	cancelled				
7	11 March 2016	(Czech Republic) Harrachov	Čerťák HS100	NH	(Slovenia) Nika Križnar	(Slovenia) Špela Rogelj	(France) Julia Clair	(Poland) Kinga Rajda	
8	12 March 2016	(Czech Republic) Harrachov	Čerťák HS100	NH	(Slovenia) Špela Rogelj	(Slovenia) Urša Bogataj	(France) Julia Clair	(Poland) Kinga Rajda	

== Overall standings ==
=== Men ===
Rank	after all 24 events	Points
1	(Germany) Danny Queck	796
2	(Germany) Michael Dreher	460
3	(Austria) Simon Greiderer	405
4	(Poland) Jakub Kot	380
5	(Slovenia) Ernest Prislič	359

=== Ladies ===
Rank	after all 8 events	Points
1	(Poland) Kinga Rajda	376
2	(Romania) Daniela Haralambie	330
3	(Slovenia) Urša Bogataj	270
4	(Poland) Magdalena Palasz	201
5	(Austria) Jacqueline Seifriedsberger	200
