= 2015–16 FIS Ski Jumping Continental Cup =

Ski-jumping competition series

FIS Ski Jumping Continental Cup 2015/16
Discipline	Men	Women
Summer	(Norway) Daniel-André Tande	(Slovenia) Ema Klinec (Japan) Sara Takanashi (Norway) Maren Lundby (Norway) Line Jahr
Winter	(Norway) Tom Hilde	(Switzerland) Sabrina Windmüller

Competition
Edition	14th (Summer), 25th (Winter)	8th (Summer), 12th (Winter)
Locations	7 (Summer), 13 (Winter)	2 (Summer), 1 (Winter)
Individual	14 (Summer), 27 (Winter)	4 (Summer), 2 (Winter)
Cancelled	— (Summer), 1 (Winter)	— (Summer), — (Winter)
Rescheduled	— (Summer), 5 (Winter)	— (Summer), — (Winter)

The 2015/16 FIS Ski Jumping Continental Cup was the 25th in a row (23rd official) Continental Cup winter season and the 14th official summer season in ski jumping for men.

This was also the 12th winter and the 8th summer season for women. The only time in history (not before or after), four competitors won the overall ranking, including other levels of ski jumping competitions.

Other competitive circuits this season included also the World Cup, Grand Prix, FIS Cup, FIS Race and Alpen Cup.

== Men's Summer ==
Individual men's events in the CC history

Total	F	L	N	Winners
157	—	84	73

after large hill event in Klingenthal (4 October 2016)

=== Calendar ===
All	No.	Date	Place (Hill)	Size	Winner	Second	Third	Overall leader	R.
144	1	4 July 2015	(Slovenia) Kranj (Bauhenk HS109)	N _{068}	(Poland) Dawid Kubacki	(Germany) Karl Geiger	(Slovenia) Peter Prevc	(Poland) Dawid Kubacki	
145	2	5 July 2015	(Slovenia) Kranj (Bauhenk HS109)	N _{069}	(Poland) Dawid Kubacki	(Slovenia) Peter Prevc	(Slovenia) Anže Lanišek	(Poland) Dawid Kubacki	
146	3	8 August 2015	(Poland) Wisła (Malinka HS134)	L _{077}	(Norway) J. Ødegård Bjøreng	(Poland) P. Kantyka	(Austria) Philipp Aschenwald	(Poland) Dawid Kubacki	
147	4	9 August 2015	(Poland) Wisła (Malinka HS134)	L _{078}	(Poland) Klemens Murańka	(Slovenia) Rok Justin	(Poland) Stefan Hula	(Poland) Dawid Kubacki	
148	5	22 August 2015	(Finland) Kuopio (Puijo HS127)	L _{079}	(Austria) Florian Altenburger	(Slovenia) Anže Lanišek	(Germany) Tim Fuchs	(Poland) P. Kantyka	
149	6	23 August 2015	(Finland) Kuopio (Puijo HS127)	L _{080}	(Slovenia) Andraž Pograjc	(Germany) Tim Fuchs	(Austria) Florian Altenburger	(Poland) P. Kantyka	
150	7	28 August 2015	(Czech Republic) Frenštát (Areal Horečky HS106)	N _{070}	(Poland) Klemens Murańka	(Italy) S. Colloredo	(Austria) Clemens Aigner	(Slovenia) Anže Lanišek	
151	8	29 August 2015	(Czech Republic) Frenštát (Areal Horečky HS106)	N _{071}	(Austria) Clemens Aigner	(Poland) Klemens Murańka	(Czech Republic) Tomas Vancura	(Slovenia) Anže Lanišek	
152	9	12 September 2015	(Austria) Stams (Brunnentalschanze HS115)	L _{081}	(Norway) Daniel-André Tande	(Poland) Maciej Kot	(Germany) Michael Neumayer	(Slovenia) Anže Lanišek	
153	10	13 September 2015	(Austria) Stams (Brunnentalschanze HS115)	L _{082}	(Norway) Daniel-André Tande	(Poland) Maciej Kot	(France) R. Lamy Chappuis	(Slovenia) Anže Lanišek	
154	11	19 September 2015	(Norway) Oslo (Midtstubakken HS106)	N _{072}	(Norway) H. Egner Granerud	(Czech Republic) Jakub Janda	(Norway) Andreas Stjernen	(Slovenia) Anže Lanišek	
155	12	20 September 2015	(Norway) Oslo (Midtstubakken HS106)	N _{073}	(Norway) Daniel-André Tande	(Norway) Fredrik Bjerkeengen	(Poland) Maciej Kot	(Norway) D.-André Tande	
156	13	3 October 2015	(Germany) Klingenthal (Vogtland Arena HS140)	L _{083}	(Norway) Daniel-André Tande	(Slovenia) Domen Prevc	(Poland) Dawid Kubacki	(Norway) D.-André Tande	
157	14	4 October 2015	(Germany) Klingenthal (Vogtland Arena HS140)	L _{084}	(Slovenia) Domen Prevc	(Norway) Andreas Stjernen	(Poland) Maciej Kot	(Norway) D.-André Tande	
14th FIS Summer Continental Cup Men's Overall (4 July – 4 October 2015)					(Norway) Daniel-André Tande	(Poland) Dawid Kubacki	(Poland) Maciej Kot	Summer Overall	

=== Overall ===
Rank	after 14 events	Points
1	(Norway) Daniel-André Tande	505
2	(Poland) Dawid Kubacki	446
3	(Poland) Maciej Kot	404
4	(Slovenia) Anže Lanišek	335
5	(Poland) Stefan Hula	325
6	(Austria) Florian Altenburger	321
7	(Poland) Klemens Murańka	312
8	(Poland) Przemysław Kantyka	283
9	(Slovenia) Andraž Pograjc	280
10	(Norway) Andreas Stjernen	277

== Men's Winter ==
Individual men's events in the CC history

Total	F	L	N	Winners
826	4	426	396

after normal hill event in Chaykovsky (13 March 2016)

=== Calendar ===
All	No.	Date	Place (Hill)	Size	Winner	Second	Third	Overall leader	R.
800	1	11 December 2015	(Norway) Rena (Renabakkene HS111 / 139)	L _{403}	(Poland) Andrzej Stękała	(Norway) H. Egner Granerud	(Slovenia) Tilen Bartol	(Poland) Andrzej Stękała	
801	2	(Note: Men's large hill originally scheduled competition in Rena (12 December) was moved from HS139 to HS111 hill.)12 December 2015	(Norway) Rena (Renabakkene HS111 / 139)	L _{404}	(Slovenia) Tilen Bartol	(Norway) H. Egner Granerud	(Norway) Fredrik Bjerkeengen	(Norway) H. Egner Granerud	
		12 December 2015	(Norway) Rena (Renabakkene HS111 / 139)	L _{cnx}	moved from HS139 to HS111 hill			—	
802	3	13 December 2015	(Norway) Rena (Renabakkene HS111 / 139)	L _{405}	(Slovenia) Tilen Bartol	(Poland) Andrzej Stękała	(Germany) Karl Geiger	(Slovenia) Tilen Bartol	
803	4	19 December 2015	(Finland) Rovaniemi (Ounasvaaran hyppy HS100)	N _{394}	(Germany) Karl Geiger	(Norway) Fredrik Bjerkeengen	(Norway) H. Egner Granerud	(Slovenia) Tilen Bartol	
804	5	20 December 2015	(Finland) Rovaniemi (Ounasvaaran hyppy HS100)	N _{395}	(Germany) David Siegel	(Germany) Karl Geiger	(Slovenia) Tilen Bartol	(Slovenia) Tilen Bartol	
805	6	27 December 2015	(Switzerland) Engelberg (Gross-Titlis-Schanze HS137)	L _{406}	(Austria) Clemens Aigner	(Poland) Dawid Kubacki	(Austria) Markus Schiffner	(Slovenia) Tilen Bartol	
806	7	28 December 2015	(Switzerland) Engelberg (Gross-Titlis-Schanze HS137)	L _{407}	(Norway) Tom Hilde	(Poland) Andrzej Stękała	(Austria) Clemens Aigner	(Slovenia) Tilen Bartol	
		9 January 2015	(Germany) Oberwiesenthal (Fichtelbergschanzen HS106)	N _{cnx}	cancelled before season and replaced in Garmisch-Pa; which was originally scheduled one week later			—	
		10 January 2015	(Germany) Oberwiesenthal (Fichtelbergschanzen HS106)	N _{cnx}	cancelled before season and replaced in Garmisch-Pa; which was originally scheduled one week later			—	
807	8	(Note: First planned in Oberwiesenthal (9 January) – got replaced in Garmisch-Pa on same date (but originally planned on 16 January).)9 January 2016	(Germany) Garmisch-Pa (Gr. Olympiaschanze HS140)	L _{408}	(Germany) David Siegel	(Austria) Thomas Hofer	(Norway) Tom Hilde	(Slovenia) Tilen Bartol	
808	9	(Note: First planned in Oberwiesenthal (10 January) – got replaced in Garmisch-Pa on same date (but originally planned on 17 January).)10 January 2016	(Germany) Garmisch-Pa (Gr. Olympiaschanze HS140)	L _{409}	(Austria) Thomas Hofer	(Poland) Dawid Kubacki	(Czech Republic) Tomas Vancura	(Slovenia) Tilen Bartol	
		16 January 2015	(Germany) Garmisch-Pa (Gr. Olympiaschanze HS140)	L _{cnx}	moved one week earlier to replace Oberwiesenthal (9 and 10 January); those dates were replaced with two Willingen events on same dates			—	
		17 January 2015	(Germany) Garmisch-Pa (Gr. Olympiaschanze HS140)	L _{cnx}	moved one week earlier to replace Oberwiesenthal (9 and 10 January); those dates were replaced with two Willingen events on same dates			—	
		(Note: Originally planned for Garmisch-Pa – Men's large hill cancelled competition in Willingen (16 January) got cancelled.)16 January 2016	(Germany) Willingen (Mühlenkopfschanze HS145)	L _{cnx}	cancelled and rescheduled on first event next day			—	
809	10	(Note: Men's large hill cancelled competition in Willingen (16 January) – originally planned for Ga-Pa – was rescheduled on 17 January (1st event of the day).)17 January 2016	(Germany) Willingen (Mühlenkopfschanze HS145)	L _{410}	(Austria) Florian Altenburger	(Germany) David Siegel	(Norway) Tom Hilde	(Germany) David Siegel	
810	11	(Note: Men's large hill second competition in Willingen (17 January) – originally planned for Garmisch-Pa – had only one round due to bad weather.)17 January 2016	(Germany) Willingen (Mühlenkopfschanze HS145)	L _{411}	(Austria) Thomas Hofer	(Germany) David Siegel	(Germany) Pius Paschke	(Germany) David Siegel	
811	12	22 January 2016	(Japan) Sapporo (Okurayama HS100) (Okurayama HS134)	N _{396}	(Czech Republic) Tomáš Vančura	(Austria) Markus Schiffner	(Slovenia) Jaka Hvala	(Germany) David Siegel	
812	13	23 January 2016	(Japan) Sapporo (Okurayama HS100) (Okurayama HS134)	L _{412}	(Norway) Tom Hilde	(Slovenia) Jaka Hvala	(Czech Republic) Lukáš Hlava	(Germany) David Siegel	
813	14	24 January 2016	(Japan) Sapporo (Okurayama HS100) (Okurayama HS134)	L _{413}	(Slovenia) Jaka Hvala	(Germany) Karl Geiger	(Slovenia) Bor Pavlovčič	(Germany) David Siegel	
814	15	30 January 2016	(Austria) Bischofshofen (Paul-Ausserleitner HS140)	L _{414}	(Germany) Karl Geiger	(Norway) Tom Hilde	(Austria) Thomas Hofer	(Germany) Karl Geiger	
815	16	(Note: Men's large hill competition in Bischofshofen (31 January) had only one round due to bad weather.)31 January 2016	(Austria) Bischofshofen (Paul-Ausserleitner HS140)	L _{415}	(Germany) M. Eisenbichler	(Italy) Alex Insam	(Poland) Piotr Żyła	(Germany) Karl Geiger	
816	17	6 February 2016	(Slovenia) Planica (Bloudkova velikanka HS139)	L _{416}	(Austria) Philipp Aschenwald	(Slovenia) Anže Semenič	(Slovenia) Tomaž Naglič	(Germany) Karl Geiger	
817	18	7 February 2016	(Slovenia) Planica (Bloudkova velikanka HS139)	L _{417}	(Austria) Philipp Aschenwald	(Germany) M. Eisenbichler	(Austria) Clemens Aigner	(Germany) Karl Geiger	
818	19	13 February 2016	(Poland) Zakopane (Wielka Krokiew HS134)	L _{418}	(Austria) Ulrich Wohlgenannt	(Austria) Philipp Aschenwald	(Austria) Clemens Aigner	(Germany) Karl Geiger	
819	20	14 February 2016	(Poland) Zakopane (Wielka Krokiew HS134)	L _{419}	(Austria) Ulrich Wohlgenannt	(Austria) Thomas Diethart	(Poland) Jan Ziobro	(Germany) Karl Geiger	
820	21	20 February 2016	(United States) Iron Mountain (Pine Mountain HS133)	L _{420}	(United States) Michael Glasder	(Poland) Bartłomiej Kłusek	(Slovenia) Ernest Prišlič	(Austria) Clemens Aigner	
821	22	21 February 2016	(United States) Iron Mountain (Pine Mountain HS133)	L _{421}	(Austria) Florian Altenburger	(Austria) Elias Tollinger	(Austria) Clemens Aigner	(Austria) Clemens Aigner	
822	23	27 February 2016	(Germany) Brotterode (Inselbergschanze HS117)	L _{422}	(Poland) Bartłomiej Kłusek	(Austria) Daniel Huber	(Germany) Tim Heinrich	(Austria) Clemens Aigner	
		28 February 2016	(Germany) Brotterode (Inselbergschanze HS117)	L _{cnx}	cancelled due to strong wind			—	
823	24	4 March 2016	(Norway) Vikersund (Vikersundbakken HS117)	L _{423}	(Slovenia) Rok Justin	(Norway) Tom Hilde	(Norway) H. Egner Granerud	(Austria) Clemens Aigner	
824	25	5 March 2016	(Norway) Vikersund (Vikersundbakken HS117)	L _{424}	(Germany) David Siegel	(Norway) Tom Hilde	(Norway) H. Egner Granerud	(Austria) Clemens Aigner	
825	26	12 March 2016	(Russia) Chaykovsky (Snezhinka HS140)	L _{425}	(Germany) M. Eisenbichler	(Germany) Karl Geiger	(Slovenia) Cene Prevc	(Austria) Clemens Aigner	
826	27	13 March 2016	(Russia) Chaykovsky (Snezhinka HS140)	L _{426}	(Germany) Karl Geiger	(Austria) Markus Schiffner	(Germany) Martin Hamann	(Norway) Tom Hilde	
25th FIS Winter Continental Cup Men's Overall (11 December 2015 – 13 March 2016)					(Norway) Tom Hilde	(Austria) Clemens Aigner	(Germany) Karl Geiger	Winter Overall	

=== Overall ===
Rank	after 27 events	Points
1	(Norway) Tom Hilde	818
2	(Austria) Clemens Aigner	805
3	(Germany) Karl Geiger	754
4	(Austria) Markus Eisenbichler	597
5	(Germany) David Siegel	559
6	(Austria) Thomas Hofer	550
7	(Czech Republic) Tomáš Vančura	548
8	(Norway) Halvor Egner Granerud	538
9	(Austria) Elias Tollinger	529
10	(Austria) Florian Altenburger	528

== Women's Summer ==
Individual women's events in the CC history

Total	L	N	M	Winners
46	—	35	11

after normal hill event in Oslo (20 September 2015)

=== Calendar ===
All	No.	Date	Place (Hill)	Size	Winner	Second	Third	Overall leader	R.
43	1	28 August 2015	(Germany) Oberwiesenthal (Fichtelbergschanzen HS106)	N _{032}	(Slovenia) Ema Klinec	(Japan) Sara Takanashi	(Germany) Katharina Althaus	(Slovenia) Ema Klinec	
44	2	29 August 2015	(Germany) Oberwiesenthal (Fichtelbergschanzen HS106)	N _{033}	(Japan) Sara Takanashi	(Slovenia) Ema Klinec	(Germany) Katharina Althaus	(Japan) Sara Takanashi (Slovenia) Ema Klinec	
45	3	19 September 2015	(Norway) Oslo (Midtstubakken HS106)	N _{034}	(Norway) Maren Lundby	(Norway) Line Jahr	(Germany) Agnes Reich	(Japan) Sara Takanashi (Slovenia) Ema Klinec	
46	4	20 September 2015	(Norway) Oslo (Midtstubakken HS106)	N _{035}	(Norway) Line Jahr	(Norway) Maren Lundby	(Czech Republic) Zdena Pesatova	(Slovenia) Ema Klinec (Japan) Sara Takanashi (Norway) Maren Lundby (Norway) Line Jahr	
8th FIS Summer Continental Cup Women's Overall (28 August – 20 September 2015)					(Slovenia) Ema Klinec (Japan) Sara Takanashi (Norway) Maren Lundby (Norway) Line Jahr			Summer Overall	

=== Overall ===
Rank	after 4 events	Points
1	(Slovenia) Ema Klinec	180
	(Japan) Sara Takanashi	180
	(Norway) Maren Lundby	180
	(Norway) Line Jahr	180
5	(Italy) Elena Runggaldier	144
6	(Romania) Daniela Haralambie	134
7	(Austria) Julia Huber	126
8	(Czech Republic) Zdena Pešatová	121
9	(Germany) Katharina Althaus	120
10	(Germany) Luisa Görlich	116

== Women's Winter ==
Individual women's events in the CC history

Total	L	N	M	Winners
146	9	122	15

after normal hill event in Notodden (12 December 2015)

=== Calendar ===
All	No.	Date	Place (HIll)	Size	Winner	Second	Third	Overall leader	R.
145	1	11 December 2015	(Norway) Notodden (Tveitanbakken HS100)	N _{121}	(Switzerland) Sabrina Windmüller	(Austria) Julia Huber	(Norway) Anna Odine Strøm	(Switzerland) Sabrina Windmüller	
146	2	12 December 2015	(Norway) Notodden (Tveitanbakken HS100)	N _{122}	(Switzerland) Sabrina Windmüller	(Germany) Pauline Heßler	(Austria) Julia Huber	(Switzerland) Sabrina Windmüller	
12th FIS Winter Continental Cup Women's Overall (11 – 12 December 2015)					(Switzerland) Sabrina Windmüller	(Austria) Julia Huber	(Norway) Anna Odine Strøm	Winter Overall	

=== Overall ===
Rank	after 2 events	Points
1	(Switzerland) Sabrina Windmüller	200
2	(Austria) Julia Huber	140
3	(Norway) Anna Odine Strøm	110
4	(Austria) Claudia Purker	95
5	(Germany) Pauline Heßler	80
6	(Norway) Silje Opseth	77
7	(Finland) Susanna Forsström	65
8	(Russia) Lidiia Iakovleva	64
9	(Norway) Tonje Bakke	62
10	(France) Océane Avocat Gros	46
	(South Korea) Park Guy-lim	46

== Europa Cup vs. Continental Cup ==
- Last two Europa Cup seasons (1991/92 and 1992/93) are recognized as first two Continental Cup seasons by International Ski Federation (FIS), although Continental Cup under this name officially started first season in 1993/94 season.

== See also ==
- 2015–16 FIS World Cup
- 2015 FIS Grand Prix
- 2015–16 FIS Cup
- 2015–16 FIS Race
- 2015–16 FIS Alpen Cup
