= 2013–14 FIS Ski Jumping Continental Cup =

Ski-jumping competition series

FIS Ski Jumping Continental Cup 2013/14
Discipline	Men	Women
Summer	(Germany) Marinus Kraus	(Slovenia) Ema Klinec
Winter	(Austria) Manuel Fettner	(United States) Nina Lussi

Competition
Edition	12th (Summer), 23rd (Winter)	6th (Summer), 10th (Winter)
Locations	5 (Summer), 11 (Winter)	1 (Summer), 3 (Winter)
Individual	10 (Summer), 24 (Winter)	2 (Summer), 6 (Winter)
Cancelled	— (Summer), 6 (Winter)	2 (Summer), 2 (Winter)
Rescheduled	— (Summer), 6 (Winter)	— (Summer), — (Winter)

The 2014/15 FIS Ski Jumping Continental Cup was the 23rd in a row (21st official) Continental Cup winter season and the 11th official summer season in ski jumping for men.

This was also the 10th winter and the 6th summer season for women. Ema Klinec won summer and Nina Lussi winter overall.

Other competitions this season were World Cup and Grand Prix.

== Men's Summer ==
Individual men's events in the CC history

Total	F	L	N	Winners
129	—	66	63

after large hill event in Klingenthal (22 September 2013)

=== Calendar ===
All	No.	Date	Place (Hill)	Size	Winner	Second	Third	Overall leader	R.
120	1	29 June 2013	(Austria) Stams (Brunnentalschanze HS115)	L _{059}	(Poland) Krzysztof Biegun	(Germany) Daniel Wenig	(Germany) Stephan Leyhe	(Poland) Krzysztof Biegun	
121	2	30 June 2013	(Austria) Stams (Brunnentalschanze HS115)	L _{060}	(Czech Republic) Jakub Janda	(Slovenia) Rok Justin	(Poland) Jan Ziobro	(Czech Republic) Jakub Janda	
122	3	6 July 2013	(Slovenia) Kranj (Bauhenk HS109)	N _{062}	(Czech Republic) Jakub Janda	(Poland) Krzysztof Biegun	(Czech Republic) Čestmír Kožíšek	(Czech Republic) Jakub Janda	
123	4	7 July 2013	(Slovenia) Kranj (Bauhenk HS109)	N _{063}	(Slovenia) Nejc Dežman	(Poland) Krzysztof Biegun	(Slovenia) Jaka Hvala	(Poland) Krzysztof Biegun	
124	5	3 August 2013	(Finland) Kuopio (Puijo HS127)	L _{061}	(Czech Republic) Jakub Janda	(Slovenia) Jernej Damjan	(Germany) Daniel Wenig	(Czech Republic) Jakub Janda	
125	6	4 August 2013	(Finland) Kuopio (Puijo HS127)	L _{062}	(Finland) Jarkko Määttä	(Slovenia) Jernej Damjan	(Czech Republic) Čestmír Kožíšek	(Czech Republic) Jakub Janda	
126	7	14 September 2013	(Norway) Lillehammer (Lysgårdsbakken HS138)	L _{063}	(Austria) Markus Schiffner	(Germany) Marinus Kraus	(Norway) Fredrik Bjerkeengen	(Czech Republic) Jakub Janda	
127	8	15 September 2013	(Norway) Lillehammer (Lysgårdsbakken HS138)	L _{064}	(Germany) Marinus Kraus	(Austria) Martin Koch	(Slovenia) Anže Lanišek	(Czech Republic) Jakub Janda	
128	9	21 September 2013	(Germany) Klingenthal (Vogtland Arena HS140)	L _{065}	(Poland) Klemens Murańka	(Russia) M. Maksimochkin	(Austria) Thomas Diethart	(Czech Republic) Jakub Janda	
129	10	22 September 2013	(Germany) Klingenthal (Vogtland Arena HS140)	L _{066}	(Poland) Klemens Murańka	(Italy) Roberto Dellasega	(Slovenia) Peter Prevc	(Germany) Marinus Kraus	
12th FIS Summer Continental Cup Men's Overall (29 June – 22 September 2013)					(Austria) Marinus Kraus	(Czech Republic) Jakub Janda	(Poland) Krzysztof Biegun	Summer Overall	

==== Overall ====
Rank	after 10 events	Points
1	(Germany) Marinus Kraus	409
2	(Czech Republic) Jakub Janda	401
3	(Poland) Krzysztof Biegun	292
4	(Poland) Klemens Murańka	273
5	(Germany) Daniel Wenig	268
6	(Czech Republic) Čestmír Kožíšek	264
7	(Slovenia) Jernej Damjan	237
8	(Germany) Markus Eisenbichler	200
9	(Slovenia) Rok Justin	193
10	(Slovenia) Nejc Dežman	191
	(Germany) Stephan Leyhe	191

== Men's Winter ==
Individual men's events in the CC history

Total	F	L	N	Winners
773	4	381	388

after large hill event in Nizhny Tagil (15 March 2014)

=== Calendar ===
All	No.	Date	Place (Hill)	Size	Winner	Second	Third	Overall leader	R.
		13 December 2013	(Norway) Rena (Renabakkene HS139 / 111)	L _{cnx}	both events moved from HS139 to HS111 hill on same dates			—	
		14 December 2013	(Norway) Rena (Renabakkene HS139 / 111)	L _{cnx}	both events moved from HS139 to HS111 hill on same dates			—	
750	1	(Note: Men's large hill HS139 competition in Rena (13 December) was moved to HS111 hill.)13 December 2013	(Norway) Rena (Renabakkene HS139 / 111)	L _{366}	(Slovenia) Jernej Damjan	(Poland) Stefan Hula	(Austria) Manuel Poppinger	(Slovenia) Jernej Damjan	
751	2	(Note: Men's large hill HS139 competition in Rena (14 December) was moved to HS111 hill.)14 December 2013	(Norway) Rena (Renabakkene HS139 / 111)	L _{367}	(Austria) Michael Hayböck	(Slovenia) Jernej Damjan	(Austria) Manuel Poppinger	(Slovenia) Jernej Damjan	
		15 December 2013	(Norway) Rena (Renabakkene HS139 / 111)	L _{cnx}	cancelled due to bad weather conditions			—	
752	3	20 December 2013	(Finland) Lahti (Salpausselkä HS130)	L _{368}	(Austria) Michael Hayböck	(Slovenia) Jernej Damjan	(Slovenia) Nejc Dežman	(Slovenia) Jernej Damjan	
753	4	21 December 2013	(Finland) Lahti (Salpausselkä HS130)	L _{369}	(Austria) Michael Hayböck	(Austria) Manuel Fettner	(Slovenia) Jernej Damjan	(Austria) Michael Hayböck	
754	5	27 December 2013	(Switzerland) Engelberg (Gross-Titlis-Schanze HS137)	L _{370}	(Austria) Manuel Fettner	(Austria) Manuel Poppinger	(Austria) Simon Greiderer	(Austria) Michael Hayböck	
755	6	28 December 2013	(Switzerland) Engelberg (Gross-Titlis-Schanze HS137)	L _{371}	(Austria) Manuel Poppinger	(Norway) Daniel-André Tande	(Austria) Manuel Fettner	(Austria) M. Poppinger	
		4 January 2014	(Poland) Wisła (Malinka HS134)	L _{cnx}	cancelled due to high temperatures and lack of snow (one of those two event was replaced in Sapporo on 16 January)			—	
		5 January 2014	(Poland) Wisła (Malinka HS134)	L _{cnx}	cancelled due to high temperatures and lack of snow (one of those two event was replaced in Sapporo on 16 January)			—	
756	7	11 January 2014	(France) Courchevel (Tremplin du Praz HS96)	N _{381}	(Slovenia) Rok Justin	(Germany) Pius Paschke	(France) R. Lamy Chappuis	(Austria) M. Poppinger	
757	8	12 January 2014	(France) Courchevel (Tremplin du Praz HS96)	N _{382}	(Slovenia) Rok Justin	(Germany) Karl Geiger	(Slovenia) Matjaž Pungertar	(Austria) M. Poppinger	
758	9	(Note: One of two cancelled men's large hill competition in Wisła was rescheduled to Sapporo on 16 January.)16 January 2014	(Japan) Sapporo (Miyanomori HS100) (Ōkurayama HS134)	N _{383}	(Slovenia) Nejc Dežman	(Germany) Danny Queck (Switzerland) Gregor Deschwanden		(Austria) M. Poppinger	
759	10	17 January 2014	(Japan) Sapporo (Miyanomori HS100) (Ōkurayama HS134)	N _{384}	(Slovenia) Nejc Dežman	(Slovenia) Robert Hrgota (Japan) Takanobu Okabe		(Slovenia) Nejc Dežman	
760	11	18 January 2014	(Japan) Sapporo (Miyanomori HS100) (Ōkurayama HS134)	L _{372}	(Germany) Markus Eisenbichler	(Japan) Junshiro Kobayashi	(Norway) Simen Key Grimsrud	(Slovenia) Nejc Dežman	
761	12	19 January 2014	(Japan) Sapporo (Miyanomori HS100) (Ōkurayama HS134)	L _{373}	(Germany) Markus Eisenbichler	(Japan) Junshiro Kobayashi	(Slovenia) Robert Hrgota	(Slovenia) Nejc Dežman	
		25 January 2014	(Austria) Bischofshofen (Paul-Ausserleitner HS140)	L _{cnx}	cancelled due to high temperatures and lack of snow (both events were replaced in Seefeld on 20 and 21 February)			—	
		26 January 2014	(Austria) Bischofshofen (Paul-Ausserleitner HS140)	L _{cnx}	cancelled due to high temperatures and lack of snow (both events were replaced in Seefeld on 20 and 21 February)			—	
		1 February 2014	(Slovenia) Planica (Bloudkova velikanka HS139)	L _{cnx}	cancelled due to heavy snowfall (2nd event was moved to Brotterode on 14 February)			—	
		2 February 2014	(Slovenia) Planica (Bloudkova velikanka HS139)	L _{cnx}	cancelled due to heavy snowfall (2nd event was moved to Brotterode on 14 February)			—	
762	13	7 February 2014	(United States) Iron Mountain (Pine Mountain HS133)	L _{374}	(Poland) Klemens Murańka	(Germany) Karl Geiger	(Slovenia) Nejc Dežman	(Slovenia) Nejc Dežman	
763	14	8 February 2014	(United States) Iron Mountain (Pine Mountain HS133)	L _{375}	(Slovenia) Anže Lanišek	(Slovenia) Nejc Dežman	(Slovenia) Andraž Pograjc	(Slovenia) Nejc Dežman	
		9 February 2014	(United States) Iron Mountain (Pine Mountain HS133)	L _{cnx}	cancelled due to strong wind			—	
764	15	(Note: Cancelled men's large hill competition in Planica (2 February) was rescheduled to Brotterode on 14 February.)14 February 2014	(Germany) Brotterode (Inselbergschanze HS117)	L _{376}	(Germany) Karl Geiger	(Germany) Markus Eisenbichler	(Austria) Stefan Kraft	(Slovenia) Nejc Dežman	
765	16	15 February 2014	(Germany) Brotterode (Inselbergschanze HS117)	L _{377}	(Austria) Manuel Fettner	(Germany) Karl Geiger	(Austria) Daniel Huber	(Slovenia) Nejc Dežman	
766	17	16 February 2014	(Germany) Brotterode (Inselbergschanze HS117)	L _{378}	(Germany) Karl Geiger	(Slovenia) Matjaž Pungertar	(Austria) Daniel Huber	(Slovenia) Nejc Dežman	
767	18	(Note: Cancelled men's large hill competition in Bischofshofen (25 January) was rescheduled to Seefeld on 20 February.)20 February 2014	(Austria) Seefeld (Toni-Seelos HS109)	N _{385}	(Austria) Wolfgang Loitzl	(Austria) Manuel Fettner	(Norway) O. Marius Ingvaldsen	(Slovenia) Nejc Dežman	
768	19	(Note: Cancelled men's large hill competition in Bischofshofen (26 January) was rescheduled to Seefeld on 21 February.)21 February 2014	(Austria) Seefeld (Toni-Seelos HS109)	N _{386}	(Austria) Manuel Fettner	(Austria) Manuel Poppinger	(Germany) Danny Queck	(Slovenia) Nejc Dežman	
		22 February 2014	(Germany) Garmisch-Pa (Gr. Olympiaschanze HS140)	L _{cnx}	cancelled due to high temperatures and lack of snow			—	
		23 February 2014	(Germany) Garmisch-Pa (Gr. Olympiaschanze HS140)	L _{cnx}	cancelled due to high temperatures and lack of snow			—	
769	20	1 March 2014	(Sweden) Falun (Lugnet HS100)	N _{387}	(Slovenia) Rok Justin	(Slovenia) Cene Prevc	(Germany) Daniel Wenig	(Slovenia) Nejc Dežman	
770	21	2 March 2014	(Sweden) Falun (Lugnet HS100)	N _{388}	(Germany) Daniel Wenig	(Slovenia) Rok Justin	(Austria) Stefan Hayböck	(Slovenia) Nejc Dežman	
771	22	8 March 2014	(Poland) Zakopane (Wielka Krokiew HS134)	L _{379}	(Slovenia) Anže Semenič	(Germany) Daniel Wenig	(Slovenia) Cene Prevc	(Slovenia) Nejc Dežman	
772	23	9 March 2014	(Poland) Zakopane (Wielka Krokiew HS134)	L _{380}	(Norway) Bjørn Einar Romøren	(Slovenia) Anže Lanišek	(Slovenia) Cene Prevc	(Slovenia) Nejc Dežman	
773	24	(Note: Men's large hill competition in Nizhny Tagil (15 March) had only one round due to wind and snowfall.)15 March 2014	(Russia) Nizhny Tagil (Tramplin Stork HS134)	L _{381}	(Slovenia) Rok Justin	(Austria) Manuel Fettner	(Russia) M. Maksimochkin	(Austria) Manuel Fettner	
		16 March 2014	(Russia) Nizhny Tagil (Tramplin Stork HS134)	L _{cnx}	cancelled due to strong wind			—	
23rd FIS Winter Continental Cup Men's Overall (13 December 2013 – 15 March 2014)					(Austria) Manuel Fettner	(Slovenia) Nejc Dežman	(Slovenia) Rok Justin	Winter Overall	

==== Overall ====
Rank	after 24 events	Points
1	(Austria) Manuel Fettner	803
2	(Slovenia) Nejc Dežman	731
3	(Slovenia) Rok Justin	689
4	(Germany) Daniel Wenig	655
5	(Germany) Karl Geiger	601
6	(Germany) Pius Paschke	566
7	(Slovenia) Robert Hrgota	553
8	(Slovenia) Anže Lanišek	527
9	(Germany) Markus Eisenbichler	514
10	(Germany) Danny Queck	512

== Women's Summer ==
Individual women's events in the CC history

Total	L	N	M	Winners
40	—	29	11

after normal hill event in Lillehammer (15 September 2013)

=== Calendar ===
All	No.	Date	Place (Hill)	Size	Winner	Second	Third	Overall leader	R.
		9 August 2013	(France) Gérardmer (Tremplin des Bas-Rupts HS72)	M _{cnx}	cancelled due to financial problems			—	
		10 August 2013	(France) Gérardmer (Tremplin des Bas-Rupts HS72)	M _{cnx}	cancelled due to financial problems			—	
39	1	14 September 2013	(Norway) Lillehammer (Lysgårdsbakken HS100)	N _{028}	(Slovenia) Ema Klinec	(United States) Jessica Jerome	(Norway) Line Jahr	(Slovenia) Ema Klinec	
40	2	15 September 2013	(Norway) Lillehammer (Lysgårdsbakken HS100)	N _{029}	(Slovenia) Ema Klinec	(Norway) Line Jahr	(United States) Jessica Jerome	(Slovenia) Ema Klinec	
6th FIS Summer Continental Cup Women's Overall (14 – 15 September 2012)					(Slovenia) Ema Klinec	(United States) Jessica Jerome	(Norway) Line Jahr	Summer Overall	

=== Overall ===
Rank	after 2 events	Points
1	(Slovenia) Ema Klinec	200
2	(United States) Jessica Jerome	140
	(Norway) Line Jahr	140
4	(Norway) Helena Olsson Smeby	95
	(Norway) Maren Lundby	95
6	(Slovenia) Barbara Klinec	72
7	(Germany) Gianina Ernst	69
8	(United States) Nina Lussi	68
9	(Germany) Pauline Heßler	56
10	(Canada) Jasmine Sepandj	50
	(Norway) Anna Odine Strøm	50

== Women's Winter ==
Individual women's events in the CC history

Total	L	N	M	Winners
140	9	116	15

after normal hill event in Falun (2 March 2014)

=== Winter ===
All	No.	Date	Place (Hill)	Size	Winner	Second	Third	Overall leader	R.
135	1	13 December 2013	(Norway) Notodden (Tveitanbakken HS100)	N _{111}	(Norway) Anette Sagen	(Norway) Gyda Enger	(United States) Alissa Johnson	(Norway) Anette Sagen	
136	2	14 December 2013	(Norway) Notodden (Tveitanbakken HS100)	N _{112}	(Norway) Anette Sagen	(Norway) Gyda Enger	(Norway) Anna Odine Strøm	(Norway) Anette Sagen	
137	3	15 February 2014	(Finland) Lahti (Salpausselkä HS100)	N _{113}	(Germany) Juliane Seyfarth	(Germany) Anna Häfele	(Norway) Anna Odine Strøm	(Norway) Anette Sagen	
138	4	16 February 2014	(Finland) Lahti (Salpausselkä HS100)	N _{114}	(Germany) Anna Häfele	(Germany) Juliane Seyfarth	(Russia) Sofia Tikhonova	(Germany) Juliane Seyfarth	
139	5	1 March 2014	(Sweden) Falun (Lugnet HS100)	N _{115}	(United States) Nina Lussi	(Poland) Joanna Szwab	(Netherlands) Wendy Vuik	(Germany) Juliane Seyfarth	
140	6	2 March 2014	(Sweden) Falun (Lugnet HS100)	N _{116}	(Finland) S. Forsström	(United States) Nina Lussi	(United States) Nita Englund	(United States) Nina Lussi	
		22 March 2014	(Germany) Ruhpolding (Toni-Plenk-Schanze HS100)	N _{cnx}	lack of snow and warm temperatures			—	
		23 March 2014	(Germany) Ruhpolding (Toni-Plenk-Schanze HS100)	N _{cnx}	lack of snow and warm temperatures			—	
10th FIS Winter Continental Cup Women's Overall (13 December 2013 – 2 March 2014)					(United States) Nina Lussi	(Finland) S. Forsström	(Germany) Juliane Seyfarth	Winter Overall	

==== Overall ====
Rank	after 6 events	Points
1	(United States) Nina Lussi	298
2	(Finland) Susanna Forsström	257
3	(Germany) Jullianee Seyfarth	251
4	(Norway) Anna Odine Strøm	210
5	(Norway) Anette Sagen	200
6	(Germany) Anna Häfele	180
7	(Russia) Sofja Tichonowa	166
8	(Norway) Gyda Enger	160
9	(Germany) Anna Rupprecht	152
	(United States) Nita Englund	152

== Europa Cup vs. Continental Cup ==
- Last two Europa Cup seasons (1991/92 and 1992/93) are recognized as first two Continental Cup seasons by International Ski Federation (FIS), although Continental Cup under this name officially started first season in 1993/94 season.

== See also ==
- 2013–14 FIS World Cup
- 2013 FIS Grand Prix
- 2013–14 FIS Alpen Cup
