= 2013–14 FIS Ski Jumping Alpen Cup =

Alpen Cup 2013/14
Discipline	Men	Women
Overall	(Austria) Patrick Streitler	(Austria) Elisabeth Raudaschl

Competition
Edition	24th	6th
Locations	6	5
Individual	12	10
Cancelled	—	4

The 2013/14 FIS Ski Jumping Alpen Cup was the 24th Alpen Cup season in ski jumping for men and the 6th for ladies. It began on 14 August 2013 in Pöhla, Germany and ended on 9 March 2014 in Chaux-Neuve, France.

Other competitive circuits this season included the World Cup, Grand Prix and Continental Cup.

== Calendar ==
=== Men ===
Season	Date	Place	Hill	Size	Winner	Second	Third	Ref.
1	13 September 2013	(Switzerland) Einsiedeln	Andreas Küttel Schanze HS117	LH	(Germany) Tim Fuchs	(Austria) Patrick Streitler	(Germany) Michael Herrmann	
2	14 September 2013	(Switzerland) Einsiedeln	Andreas Küttel Schanze HS117	LH	(Germany) Tim Fuchs	(Austria) Patrick Streitler	(Austria) Elias Tollinger	
3	27 September 2013	(Germany) Oberwiesenthal	Fichtelbergschanzen HS106	NH	(Switzerland) Killian Peier	(Germany) Tim Fuchs	(Slovenia) Anže Lanišek (Slovenia) Cene Prevc	
4	28 September 2013	(Germany) Oberwiesenthal	Fichtelbergschanzen HS106	NH	(Slovenia) Anže Lanišek	(Germany) Tim Fuchs	(Slovenia) Cene Prevc	
5	14 December 2013	(Austria) Seefeld	Toni-Seelos-Olympiaschanze HS109	NH	(Austria) Patrick Streitler	(Austria) Elias Tollinger	(Switzerland) Andreas Schuler	
6	15 December 2013	(Austria) Seefeld	Toni-Seelos-Olympiaschanze HS109	NH	(Austria) Patrick Streitler	(Austria) Elias Tollinger	(Slovenia) Cene Prevc	
7	10 January 2014	(Italy) Predazzo	Trampolino dal Ben HS106	NH	(Slovenia) Anže Lanišek	(Germany) Michael Herrmann	(Germany) Sebastian Bradatsch	
8	11 January 2014	(Italy) Predazzo	Trampolino dal Ben HS106	NH	(Germany) Sebastian Bradatsch (Austria) Stefan Huber		(Slovenia) Žiga Jelar	
9	7 February 2014	(Slovenia) Kranj	Bauhenk HS109	NH	(Germany) Paul Winter	(Germany) Sebastian Bradatsch	(Austria) Stefan Huber	
10	8 February 2014	(Slovenia) Kranj	Bauhenk HS109	NH	(Austria) Elias Tollinger	(Slovenia) Cene Prevc	(Germany) Paul Winter	
11	8 March 2014	(France) Chaux-Neuve	La Côté Feuillée HS118	LH	(Germany) Paul Winter	(Germany) David Siegel	(Germany) Martin Hamann	
12	9 March 2014	(France) Chaux-Neuve	La Côté Feuillée HS118	LH	(Austria) Elias Tollinger	(Austria) Patrick Streitler	(Germany) Dominik Mayländer	

=== Ladies ===
Season	Date	Place	Hill	Size	Winner	Second	Third	Ref.
1	14 August 2013	(Germany) Pöhla	Pöhlbachschanze HS65	MH	(Germany) Gianina Ernst	(Germany) Melanie Häckert	(Czech Republic) Zdena Pesatová	
2	15 August 2013	(Germany) Pöhla	Pöhlbachschanze HS65	MH	(Germany) Gianina Ernst	(Germany) Melanie Häckert	(Austria) Elisabeth Raudaschl	
3	17 August 2013	(Germany) Bischofsgrün	Ochsenkopfschanze HS71	MH	(Austria) Elisabeth Raudaschl	(Germany) Veronika Zobel	(Czech Republic) Zdena Pesatová	
4	18 August 2013	(Germany) Bischofsgrün	Ochsenkopfschanze HS71	MH	(Austria) Elisabeth Raudaschl	(Germany) Gianina Ernst	(Germany) Anna Rupprecht	
5	13 September 2013	(Switzerland) Einsiedeln	Simon Ammann Schanze HS77	MH	(Austria) Lisa Wiegele	(Austria) Elisabeth Raudaschl	(Germany) Agnes Reisch	
6	14 September 2013	(Switzerland) Einsiedeln	Simon Ammann Schanze HS77	MH	(Austria) Elisabeth Raudaschl	(Austria) Timna Moser	(Austria) Sonja Schoitsch	
7	21 December 2013	(Germany) Rastbüchl	Baptist-Kitzlinger-Schanze HS70	MH	(Austria) Elisabeth Raudaschl	(Germany) Melanie Häckert	(Austria) Claudia Purker	
8	22 December 2013	(Germany) Rastbüchl	Baptist-Kitzlinger-Schanze HS70	MH	(Germany) Melanie Häckert	(Austria) Elisabeth Raudaschl	(Germany) Sophia Görlich	
9	10 January 2014	(Italy) Predazzo	Trampolino dal Ben HS106	NH	(Slovenia) Ema Klinec	(Germany) Anna Rupprecht	(Slovenia) Urša Bogataj	
10	11 January 2014	(Italy) Predazzo	Trampolino dal Ben HS106	NH	(Slovenia) Urša Bogataj	(Germany) Anna Rupprecht	(Germany) Melanie Häckert	
	7 February 2014	(Austria) Achomitz	Natursprunganlage HS80	MH	cancelled			
	8 February 2014	(Austria) Achomitz	Natursprunganlage HS80	MH	cancelled			
	22 February 2014	(Slovenia) Žiri	Nordijski Center Račeva HS66	MH	cancelled			
	23 February 2014	(Slovenia) Žiri	Nordijski Center Račeva HS66	MH	cancelled			

== Overall standings ==
=== Men ===
Rank	after 12 events	Points
1	(Austria) Patrick Streitler	648
2	(Austria) Elias Tollinger	618
3	(Germany) Sebastian Bradatsch	500
4	(Slovenia) Cene Prevc	460
5	(Germany) Paul Winter	455

=== Ladies ===
Rank	after 10 events	Points
1	(Austria) Elisabeth Raudaschl	750
2	(Germany) Melanie Häckert	594
3	(Germany) Anna Rupprecht	404
4	(Austria) Sonja Schoitsch	392
5	(Germany) Veronika Zobel	363
