= 2013 FIS Ski Jumping Grand Prix =

Grand Prix 2013
Discipline	Men	Women
Overall	(Germany) Andreas Wellinger	(Japan) Sara Takanashi
Nations Cup	Germany	Japan

Competition
Edition	20th	2nd
Locations	9	4
Individual	11	6
Team	1	—
Mixed	2	2
Cancelled	1	—

The 2013 FIS Ski Jumping Grand Prix was the 20th Summer Grand Prix season in ski jumping on plastic for men and the 2nd for ladies.

Season began on 26 July 2013 in Hinterzarten, Germany and ends on 3 October 2013 in Klingenthal, Germany.

For men Andreas Wellinger was the overall and team of Germany was the Nations Cup winner.

For ladies Sara Takanashi was the overall and team of Japan was the Nations Cup winner.

Other competitive circuits this season included the World Cup, Continental Cup and Alpen Cup.

== Calendar ==
=== Men ===
Num	Season	Date	Place	Hill	Size	Winner	Second	Third	Yellow bib	Ref.
137	1	28 July 2013	(Germany) Hinterzarten	Rothaus-Schanze HS108	NH	(Germany) Richard Freitag	(Germany) Andreas Wellinger	(Slovenia) Matjaž Pungertar	(Germany) Richard Freitag	
138	2	3 August 2013	(Poland) Wisła	Malinka HS134	LH	(Germany) Andreas Wellinger	(Poland) Maciej Kot	(Czech Republic) Roman Koudelka	(Germany) Andreas Wellinger	
139	3	15 August 2013	(France) Courchevel	Tremplin du Praz HS132	LH	(Germany) Andreas Wellinger	(Germany) Andreas Wank	(Germany) Michael Neumayer	(Germany) Andreas Wellinger	
140	4	17 August 2013	(Switzerland) Einsiedeln	Andreas Küttel Schanze HS117	LH	(Poland) Kamil Stoch	(Poland) Maciej Kot	(Germany) Andreas Wellinger	(Germany) Andreas Wellinger	
141	5	23 August 2013	(Japan) Hakuba	Olympic Ski Jumps HS131 (night)	LH	(Poland) Krzysztof Biegun	(Switzerland) Simon Ammann	(Czech Republic) Čestmír Kožíšek	(Germany) Andreas Wellinger	
142	6	24 August 2013	(Japan) Hakuba	Olympic Ski Jumps HS131 (night)	LH	(Japan) Noriaki Kasai (Slovenia) Jernej Damjan		(Poland) Jan Ziobro	(Germany) Andreas Wellinger	
143	7	14 September 2013	(Russia) Nizhny Tagil	Tramplin Stork HS100 (night)	NH	(Norway) Anders Bardal	(Norway) Tom Hilde	(Czech Republic) Jakub Janda	(Germany) Andreas Wellinger	
144	8	15 September 2013	(Russia) Nizhny Tagil	Tramplin Stork HS134	LH	(Czech Republic) Jakub Janda	(Slovenia) Jernej Damjan	(Poland) Krzysztof Biegun (Norway) Anders Bardal	(Germany) Andreas Wellinger	
145	9	21 September 2013	(Kazakhstan) Almaty	Sunkar HS140	LH	(Norway) Anders Bardal	(Slovenia) Jernej Damjan	(Czech Republic) Antonín Hájek	(Germany) Andreas Wellinger	
146	10	22 September 2013	(Kazakhstan) Almaty	Sunkar HS140	LH	(Slovenia) Matjaž Pungertar	(Slovenia) Jernej Damjan	(Japan) Reruhi Shimizu	(Slovenia) Jernej Damjan	
		29 September 2013	(Austria) Hinzenbach	Aigner-Schanze HS94	NH	strong wind				
147	11	3 October 2013	(Germany) Klingenthal	Vogtland Arena HS140	LH	(Germany) Andreas Wellinger	(Austria) Andreas Kofler	(Finland) Janne Ahonen	(Germany) Andreas Wellinger	

=== Ladies ===
Num	Season	Date	Place	Hill	Size	Winner	Second	Third	Yellow bib	Ref.
5	1	26 July 2013	(Germany) Hinterzarten	Rothaus-Schanze HS108	NH	(Canada) Alexandra Pretorius	(Japan) Sara Takanashi	(Slovenia) Katja Požun	(Canada) Alexandra Pretorius	
6	2	15 August 2013	(France) Courchevel	Tremplin du Praz HS96	NH	(Slovenia) Ema Klinec	(United States) Sarah Hendrickson	(Japan) Yūki Itō	(Japan) Sara Takanashi	
7	3	13 September 2013	(Russia) Nizhny Tagil	Tramplin Stork HS100	NH	(Japan) Sara Takanashi	(France) Coline Mattel	(Slovenia) Katja Požun	(Japan) Sara Takanashi	
8	4	14 September 2013	(Russia) Nizhny Tagil	Tramplin Stork HS100	NH	(Japan) Sara Takanashi	(France) Coline Mattel	(Germany) Katharina Althaus	(Japan) Sara Takanashi	
9	5	21 September 2013	(Kazakhstan) Almaty	Sunkar HS106	NH	(Japan) Sara Takanashi	(France) Coline Mattel	(Japan) Yurina Yamada	(Japan) Sara Takanashi	
10	6	22 September 2013	(Kazakhstan) Almaty	Sunkar HS106	NH	(Japan) Sara Takanashi	(Slovenia) Katja Požun	(Canada) Atsuko Tanaka	(Japan) Sara Takanashi	

=== Mixed ===
Num	Season	Date	Place	Hill	Size	Winner	Second	Third	Yellow bib	Ref.
3	1	27 July 2013	(Germany) Hinterzarten	Rothaus-Schanze HS108	NH	Japan Yūki Itō; Noriaki Kasai; Sara Takanashi; Yuta Watase	Slovenia Maja Vtič; Nejc Dežman; Katja Požun; Matjaž Pungertar	Germany Ulrike Gräßler; Andreas Wank; Svenja Würth; Richard Freitag	Japan	
4	2	14 August 2013	(France) Courchevel	Tremplin du Praz HS132	LH	Germany Svenja Würth; Michael Neumayer; Ulrike Gräßler; Andreas Wellinger	Japan Yūki Itō; Yuta Watase; Sara Takanashi; Taku Takeuchi	France Léa Lemare; Nicolas Mayer; Coline Mattel; Vincent Descombes Sevoie	Germany	

=== Men's team ===
Num	Season	Date	Place	Hill	Size	Winner	Second	Third	Yellow bib	Ref.
17	1	2 August 2013	(Poland) Wisła	Malinka HS134	LH	Poland Maciej Kot; Krzysztof Biegun; Dawid Kubacki; Kamil Stoch	Germany Severin Freund; Michael Neumayer; Andreas Wellinger; Richard Freitag	Slovenia Robert Kranjec; Peter Prevc; Jaka Hvala; Matjaž Pungertar	Germany	

== Men's standings ==
=== Individual ===
Rank	after 11 events	Points
1	(Germany) Andreas Wellinger	440
2	(Slovenia) Jernej Damjan	419
3	(Norway) Anders Bardal	323
4	(Slovenia) Matjaž Pungertar	320
5	(Poland) Krzysztof Biegun	290

=== Nations Cup ===
Rank	after 14 events	Points
1	Germany	2116
2	Poland	1932
3	Slovenia	1736
4	Japan	1411
5	Czech Republic	1144

== Ladies' standings ==
=== Individual ===
Rank	after 6 events	Points
1	(Japan) Sara Takanashi	525
2	(France) Coline Mattel	334
3	(Slovenia) Katja Požun	286
4	(Canada) Atsuko Tanaka	184
5	(Slovenia) Eva Logar	180

=== Nations Cup ===
Rank	after 8 events	Points
1	Japan	1292
2	Slovenia	1214
3	Germany	841
4	France	835
5	Canada	616
