= 2015 FIS Ski Jumping Grand Prix =

International ski jumping competition

Grand Prix 2015
| Discipline | Men | Women |
| Overall | (Japan) Kento Sakuyama | (Japan) Sara Takanashi |
| Nations Cup | Germany | Japan |

Competition
| Edition | 22nd | 4th |
| Locations | 8 | 3 |
| Individual | 11 | 5 |
| Team | 2 | — |
| Cancelled | 1 | — |

The 2015 FIS Ski Jumping Grand Prix was the 22nd Summer Grand Prix season in ski jumping on plastic for men and the 4th for ladies.

Other competitive circuits this season included the World Cup, Continental Cup, FIS Cup, FIS Race and Alpen Cup.

== Calendar ==
=== Men ===
| Num | Season | Date | Place | Hill | Size | Winner | Second | Third | Yellow bib | Ref. |
|---|---|---|---|---|---|---|---|---|---|---|
| 157 | 1 | 1 August 2015 | (Poland) Wisła | Malinka HS134 (night) | LH | (Poland) Dawid Kubacki | (Poland) Piotr Żyła | (Norway) Kenneth Gangnes | (Poland) Dawid Kubacki | |
| | | 2 August 2015 | (Poland) Zakopane | Wielka Krokiew HS134 (night) | LH | before season; technical reasons | | | | |
| 158 | 2 | 8 August 2015 | (Germany) Hinterzarten | Rothaus-Schanze HS108 (night) | NH | (Poland) Dawid Kubacki | (Germany) Severin Freund | (Japan) Kento Sakuyama | (Poland) Dawid Kubacki | |
| 159 | 3 | 14 August 2015 | (France) Courchevel | Tremplin du Praz HS132 | LH | (Germany) Severin Freund | (Japan) Kento Sakuyama | (Slovenia) Peter Prevc | (Poland) Dawid Kubacki | |
| 160 | 4 | 15 August 2015 | (Switzerland) Einsiedeln | Andreas Küttel Schanze HS117 | LH | (Germany) Severin Freund | (Slovenia) Peter Prevc | (Poland) Kamil Stoch | (Germany) Severin Freund | |
| 161 | 5 | 29 August 2015 | (Japan) Hakuba | Olympic Ski Jumps HS131 (night) | LH | (Germany) Michael Neumayer | (Slovenia) Robert Kranjec | (Japan) Kento Sakuyama | (Germany) Severin Freund | |
| 162 | 6 | 30 August 2015 | (Japan) Hakuba | Olympic Ski Jumps HS131 | LH | (Japan) Kento Sakuyama | (Japan) Taku Takeuchi | (Czech Republic) Jakub Janda | (Japan) Kento Sakuyama | |
| | | 5 September 2015 | (Russia) Chaykovsky | Snezhinka HS140 | LH | strong wind; moved to normal hill | | | | |
| 163 | 7 | 5 September 2015 | (Russia) Chaykovsky | Snezhinka HS106 | NH | (Norway) Kenneth Gangnes | (Slovenia) Robert Kranjec | (Norway) Joachim Hauer | (Japan) Kento Sakuyama | |
| 164 | 8 | 6 September 2015 | (Russia) Chaykovsky | Snezhinka HS140 | LH | (Norway) Kenneth Gangnes | (Poland) Jan Ziobro | (Norway) Joachim Hauer | (Japan) Kento Sakuyama | |
| 165 | 9 | 12 September 2015 | (Kazakhstan) Almaty | Sunkar HS140 (night) | LH | (Austria) Stefan Kraft | (Slovenia) Robert Kranjec | (Russia) Ilmir Hazetdinov | (Japan) Kento Sakuyama | |
| 166 | 10 | 13 September 2015 | (Kazakhstan) Almaty | Sunkar HS140 (night) | LH | (Japan) Junshirō Kobayashi | (Austria) Stefan Kraft | (Japan) Kento Sakuyama | (Japan) Kento Sakuyama | |
| 167 | 11 | 27 September 2015 | (Austria) Hinzenbach | Aigner-Schanze HS94 | NH | (Austria) Gregor Schlierenzauer | (Slovenia) Peter Prevc | (Norway) Kenneth Gangnes | (Japan) Kento Sakuyama | |

=== Ladies ===
| Num | Season | Date | Place | Hill | Size | Winner | Second | Third | Yellow bib | Ref. |
|---|---|---|---|---|---|---|---|---|---|---|
| 13 | 1 | 14 August 2015 | (France) Courchevel | Tremplin du Praz HS96 | NH | (Japan) Sara Takanashi | (Japan) Yūki Itō | (Austria) Daniela Iraschko-Stolz | (Japan) Sara Takanashi | |
| 14 | 2 | 5 September 2015 | (Russia) Chaykovsky | Snezhinka HS106 (night) | NH | (Japan) Sara Takanashi | (Norway) Maren Lundby | (Norway) Line Jahr | (Japan) Sara Takanashi | |
| 15 | 3 | 6 September 2015 | (Russia) Chaykovsky | Snezhinka HS106 | NH | (Japan) Sara Takanashi | (Japan) Yūki Itō | (Norway) Line Jahr | (Japan) Sara Takanashi | |
| 16 | 4 | 12 September 2015 | (Kazakhstan) Almaty | Sunkar HS106 | NH | (Japan) Sara Takanashi | (United States) Nita Englund | (Japan) Yūki Itō | (Japan) Sara Takanashi | |
| 17 | 5 | 13 September 2015 | (Kazakhstan) Almaty | Sunkar HS106 | NH | (Japan) Sara Takanashi | (Japan) Yūki Itō | (Austria) Jacqueline Seifriedsberger | (Japan) Sara Takanashi | |

=== Men's team ===
| Num | Season | Date | Place | Hill | Size | Winner | Second | Third | Yellow bib | Ref. |
|---|---|---|---|---|---|---|---|---|---|---|
| 19 | 1 | 31 July 2015 | (Poland) Wisła | Malinka HS134 (night) | LH | Poland Maciej Kot; Piotr Żyła; Dawid Kubacki; Kamil Stoch | Germany Andreas Wank; Stephan Leyhe; Richard Freitag; Andreas Wellinger | Norway Johann André Forfang; Kenneth Gangnes; Phillip Sjøen; Anders Fannemel | Poland | |
| 20 | 2 | 7 August 2015 | (Germany) Hinterzarten | Rothaus-Schanze HS108 (night) | NH | Germany Severin Freund; Stephan Leyhe; Andreas Wellinger; Andreas Wank | Poland Maciej Kot; Piotr Żyła; Dawid Kubacki; Kamil Stoch | Norway Rune Velta; Phillip Sjøen; Kenneth Gangnes; Anders Fannemel | Poland | |

== Men's standings ==
=== Overall ===
| Rank | after 11 events | Points |
|---|---|---|
| 1 | (Japan) Kento Sakuyama | 561 |
| 2 | (Norway) Kenneth Gangnes | 402 |
| 3 | (Slovenia) Robert Kranjec | 349 |
| 4 | (Germany) Severin Freund | 325 |
| 5 | (Poland) Dawid Kubacki | 280 |

=== Nations Cup ===
| Rank | after 13 events | Points |
|---|---|---|
| 1 | Germany | 1842 |
| 2 | Poland | 1796 |
| 3 | Japan | 1654 |
| 4 | Slovenia | 1538 |
| 5 | Norway | 1408 |

=== Prize money ===
| Rank | after 13 events | CHF |
|---|---|---|
| 1 | (Norway) Kenneth Gangnes | 16,000 |
| 2 | (Germany) Severin Freund | 15,000 |
| 2 | (Japan) Kento Sakuyama | 15,000 |
| 3 | (Poland) Dawid Kubacki | 13,000 |
| 5 | (Slovenia) Robert Kranjec | 10,500 |

== Ladies' standings ==
=== Overall ===
| Rank | after 5 events | Points |
|---|---|---|
| 1 | (Japan) Sara Takanashi | 500 |
| 2 | (Japan) Yūki Itō | 350 |
| 3 | (United States) Nita Englund | 209 |
| 4 | (Norway) Maren Lundby | 192 |
| 5 | (France) Julia Clair | 187 |

=== Nations Cup ===
| Rank | after 5 events | Points |
|---|---|---|
| 1 | Japan | 975 |
| 2 | Slovenia | 545 |
| 3 | Russia | 384 |
| 4 | Norway | 376 |
| 5 | France | 302 |

=== Prize money ===
| Rank | after 5 events | CHF |
|---|---|---|
| 1 | (Japan) Sara Takanashi | 12,500 |
| 2 | (Japan) Yūki Itō | 6,000 |
| 3 | (Norway) Maren Lundby | 2,000 |
| | (United States) Nita Englund | 2,000 |
| | (Norway) Line Jahr | 2,000 |
