= Eduard Torok =

Romanian ski jumper (born 1997)

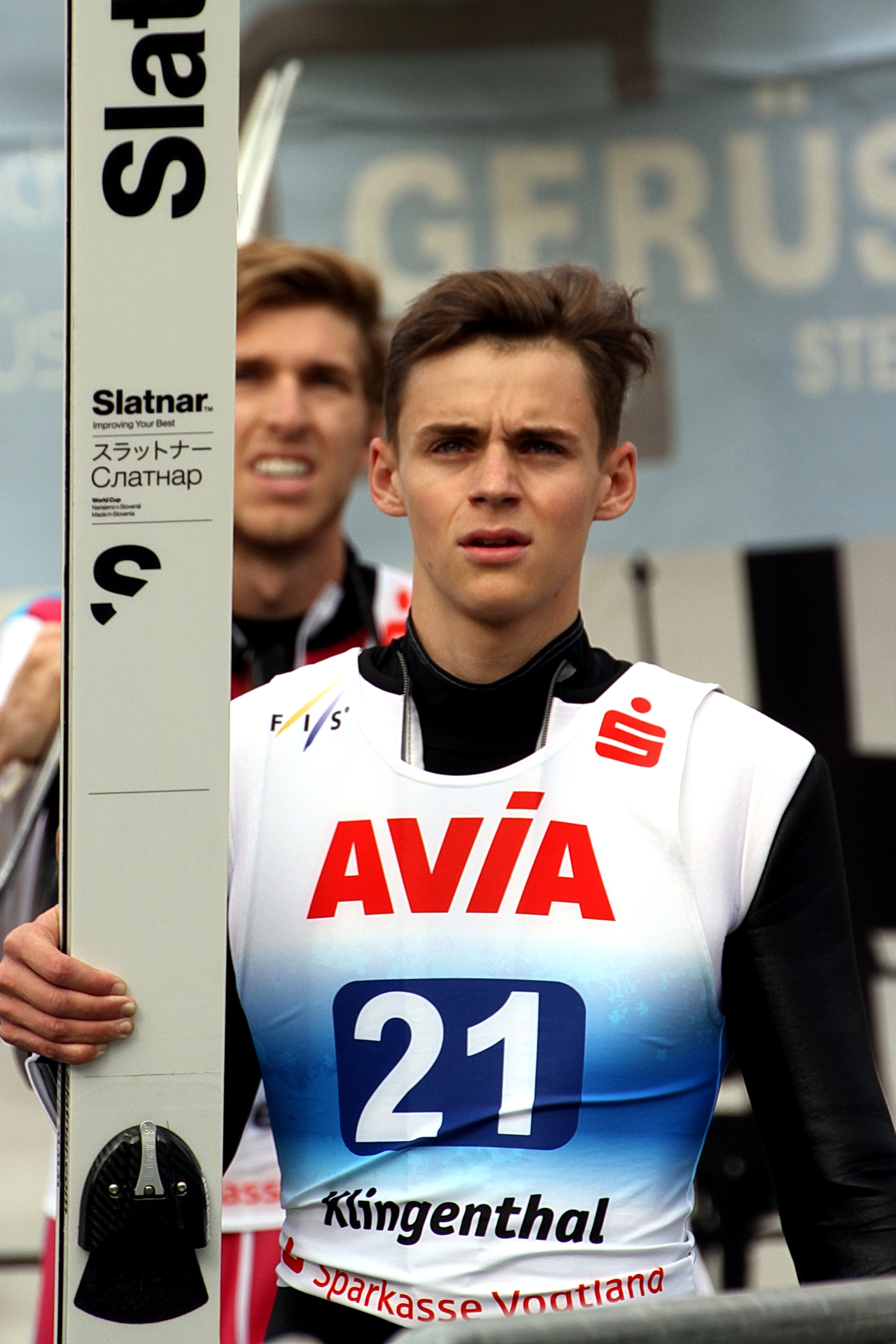

Personal information
- Nationality: Romania (2010–2017); Hungary (2019)
- Born: 2 May 1997 (age 29) Brașov, Romania
- Height: 1.78

Sport
- Sport: Skiing
- Club: Dinamo Brasov - Koszegi SE

World Cup career
- Seasons: 2014
- Indiv. starts: 1

Achievements and titles
- Personal bests: 128 m (420 ft); Engelberg, 27 December 2013

Eduard Torok (born 2 May 1997) is a Romanian ski jumper who also competed for Hungary.

== Career ==
He started his career at CSS Dinamo Râșnov club. Torok made his World Cup debut in Sapporo in 2014, where he finished in 45th position, competed for Romania. After he started to compete for Hungary, he also switched the club and now performing for Koszegi Sport Egyesulet, a Hungarian ski club.

== World Cup ==
=== Standings ===
| Season | Overall | 4H | SF |
|---|---|---|---|
| 2013/14 | — | — | — |
| 2014/15 | — | — | — |

=== Individual starts (1) ===
| Season | 1 | 2 | 3 | 4 | 5 | 6 | 7 | 8 | 9 | 10 | 11 | 12 | 13 | 14 | 15 | 16 | 17 | 18 | 19 | 20 | 21 | 22 | 23 | 24 | 25 | 26 | 27 | 28 | 29 | 30 | 31 | Points |
| 2013/14 | Klingenthal | Kuusamo | Lillehammer | Lillehammer | Titisee-Neustadt | Titisee-Neustadt | Engelberg | Engelberg | Oberstdorf | Garmisch-Partenkirchen | Innsbruck | Bischofshofen | Tauplitz | Tauplitz | Wisła | Zakopane | Sapporo | Sapporo | Willingen | Willingen | Falun | Lahti | Lahti | Kuopio | Trondheim | Oslo | Planica | Planica | | | | 0 |
| 2013/14 | – | – | – | – | – | – | – | – | – | – | – | – | – | – | – | – | q | 45 | – | – | – | – | – | – | – | – | q | q | | | | 0 |
| 2014/15 | Klingenthal | Kuusamo | Kuusamo | Lillehammer | Lillehammer | Nizhny Tagil | Nizhny Tagil | Engelberg | Engelberg | Oberstdorf | Garmisch-Partenkirchen | Innsbruck | Bischofshofen | Tauplitz | Wisła | Zakopane | Sapporo | Sapporo | Willingen | Willingen | Titisee-Neustadt | Titisee-Neustadt | Vikersund | Vikersund | Lahti | Kuopio | Trondheim | Oslo | Oslo | Planica | Planica | 0 |
| 2014/15 | – | – | – | – | – | – | – | q | q | – | – | – | – | – | – | – | – | – | – | – | – | – | – | – | – | – | – | – | – | – | – | 0 |
