= 2013–14 Four Hills Tournament =

Ski jumping competition

Four Hills Tournament at the 2013–14 FIS Ski Jumping World Cup
- Venue: Schattenbergschanze, Große Olympiaschanze, Bergiselschanze, Paul-Ausserleitner-Schanze
- Location: Austria, Germany
- Dates: 29 December 2013 – 6 January 2014

Medalists
gold medal	(Austria) Thomas Diethart
silver medal	(Austria) Thomas Morgenstern
bronze medal	(Switzerland) Simon Ammann

The 2013–14 Four Hills Tournament took place at the four traditional venues of Oberstdorf, Garmisch-Partenkirchen, Innsbruck, and Bischofshofen, located in Germany and Austria, between 29 December 2013 and 6 January 2014.

== Results ==
=== Oberstdorf ===
HS 137 Schattenbergschanze, Germany
29 December 2013

Rank	Name	Nationality	Jump 1 (m)	Jump 2 (m)	Points
1	Simon Ammann	Switzerland	139.0	133.0	301.9
2	Anders Bardal	Norway	133.0	133.5	297.9
3	Thomas Diethart	Austria	139.0	134.5	297.3
3	Peter Prevc	Slovenia	139.5	134.0	297.3
5	Thomas Morgenstern	Austria	132.0	134.5	296.8
6	Noriaki Kasai	Japan	133.0	130.5	294.5
7	Michael Hayböck	Austria	131.0	129.5	284.6
8	Marinus Kraus	Germany	130.5	130.0	282.0
9	Gregor Schlierenzauer	Austria	130.5	137.0	281.6
10	Severin Freund	Germany	130.5	127.5	279.3

=== Garmisch-Partenkirchen ===
HS 140 Große Olympiaschanze, Germany
1 January 2014

Rank	Name	Nationality	Jump 1 (m)	Jump 2 (m)	Points
1	Thomas Diethart	Austria	141.0	140.5	296.1
2	Thomas Morgenstern	Austria	139.0	139.0	285.1
3	Simon Ammann	Switzerland	133.5	139.0	278.5
4	Anders Fannemel	Norway	138.0	136.5	275.7
5	Andreas Wellinger	Germany	134.0	134.5	267.2
6	Noriaki Kasai	Japan	135.0	133.0	265.3
7	Kamil Stoch	Poland	135.0	131.0	264.9
8	Gregor Schlierenzauer	Austria	133.5	133.0	264.8
9	Richard Freitag	Germany	133.0	133.5	264.2
10	Anssi Koivuranta	Finland	136.5	129.5	263.9

=== Innsbruck ===
HS 130 Bergiselschanze, Austria
4 January 2014

Rank	Name	Nationality	Jump 1 (m)	Jump 2 (m)	Points
1	Anssi Koivuranta	Finland	132.5	Cancelled (wind)	127.5
2	Simon Ammann	Switzerland	133.5	Cancelled (wind)	126.3
3	Kamil Stoch	Poland	126.5	Cancelled (wind)	126.2
4	Gregor Schlierenzauer	Austria	131.5	Cancelled (wind)	125.4
5	Thomas Diethart	Austria	126.5	Cancelled (wind)	122.7
6	Peter Prevc	Slovenia	128.0	Cancelled (wind)	122.1
7	Noriaki Kasai	Japan	126.0	Cancelled (wind)	121.3
8	Thomas Morgenstern	Austria	119.5	Cancelled (wind)	118.8
9	Jarkko Määttä	Finland	125.5	Cancelled (wind)	117.5
10	Denis Kornilov	Russia	128.0	Cancelled (wind)	117.4

=== Bischofshofen ===
HS 140 Paul-Ausserleitner-Schanze, Austria
6 January 2014

Rank	Name	Nationality	Jump 1 (m)	Jump 2 (m)	Points
1	Thomas Diethart	Austria	138.5	140.0	296.5
2	Peter Prevc	Slovenia	139.5	138.5	294.8
3	Thomas Morgenstern	Austria	137.0	142.0	293.6
4	Simon Ammann	Switzerland	137.5	137.0	285.7
5	Noriaki Kasai	Japan	133.5	137.5	281.0
6	Anders Bardal	Norway	133.5	134.5	278.4
7	Anders Fannemel	Norway	132.0	135.5	276.1
8	Kamil Stoch	Poland	134.0	133.5	275.1
9	Andreas Wellinger	Germany	134.0	133.5	273.3
10	Severin Freund	Germany	133.0	133.5	271.7

== Overall standings ==
The final standings after all four events:

Rank	Name	Nationality	Oberstdorf	Garmisch- Partenkirchen	Innsbruck	Bischofshofen	Total Points
1st place, gold medalist(s)	Thomas Diethart	Austria	297.3 (3)	296.1 (1)	122.7 (5)	296.5 (1)	1,012.6
2nd place, silver medalist(s)	Thomas Morgenstern	Austria	296.8 (5)	285.1 (2)	118.8 (8)	293.6 (3)	994.3
3rd place, bronze medalist(s)	Simon Ammann	Switzerland	301.9 (1)	278.5 (3)	126.3 (2)	285.7 (4)	992.4
4	Peter Prevc	Slovenia	297.3 (3)	257.1 (18)	122.1 (6)	294.8 (2)	971.3
5	Noriaki Kasai	Japan	294.5 (6)	265.3 (6)	121.3 (7)	281.0 (5)	962.1
6	Anders Bardal	Norway	297.9 (2)	260.6 (13)	113.7 (14)	278.4 (6)	950.6
7	Kamil Stoch	Poland	272.0 (13)	264.9 (7)	126.2 (3)	275.1 (8)	938.2
8	Gregor Schlierenzauer	Austria	281.6 (9)	264.8 (8)	125.4 (4)	260.2 (18)	932.0
9	Michael Hayböck	Austria	284.6 (7)	253.2 (24)	102.3 (34)	266.7 (14)	906.8
10	Andreas Wellinger	Germany	243.2 (29)	267.2 (5)	112.0 (18)	273.3 (9)	895.7
