= 2015–16 FIS Race (ski jumping) =

FIS Race 2015/16

The 2015/16 FIS Race (ski jumping) was the 17th FIS Race regular season as the fourth level of ski jumping competition since 1999/00. Although even before the world cup and in the old days FIS Race events were all top level organized competitions.

Other competitive circuits this season included the World Cup, Grand Prix, Continental Cup, FIS Cup and Alpen Cup.

== Calendar ==
=== Men ===
Season	Date	Place	Hill	Size	Winner	Second	Third	Ref.
1	24 September 2015	(Romania) Râșnov	Trambulina Valea Cărbunării HS71	MH	(Turkey) Muhammet Irfan Cintimar	(Turkey) Ayberk Demir	(Turkey) Fatih Arda Ipcioglu	
2	25 September 2015	(Romania) Râșnov	Trambulina Valea Cărbunării HS71	MH	(Turkey) Muhammet Irfan Cintimar	(Turkey) Fatih Arda Ipcioglu	(Turkey) Munir Gungen	
3	6 February 2016	(Canada) Whistler	Whistler Olympic Park HS106	NH	(United Kingdom) Sam Bolton	(Canada) Cory Rogans	(Canada) Max Stretch	
4	4 March 2016	(Japan) Sapporo	Miyanomori HS100	NH	(Japan) Junshirō Kobayashi	(Japan) Yukiya Sato	(Japan) Yuya Yamada	
5	6 March 2016	(Japan) Sapporo	Ōkurayama HS134	LH	cancelled			

=== Ladies ===
Season	Date	Place	Hill	Size	Winner	Second	Third	Ref.
1	24 September 2015	(Romania) Râșnov	Trambulina Valea Cărbunării HS71	MH	(Poland) Kinga Rajda	(Romania) Carina Alexandra Militaru	(Hungary) Virág Vörös	
2	25 September 2015	(Romania) Râșnov	Trambulina Valea Cărbunării HS71	MH	(Poland) Kinga Rajda	(Romania) Carina Alexandra Militaru	(Romania) Andrea Trambitas	
3	6 February 2016	(Canada) Whistler	Whistler Olympic Park HS106	NH	(Canada) Eleora Hamming	(Canada) Natasha Bodnarchuk	(Canada) Abigail Strate	
4	4 March 2016	(Japan) Sapporo	Miyanomori HS100	NH	(Japan) Sara Takanashi	(Japan) Yūka Setō	(Japan) Yūki Itō	
5	6 March 2016	(Japan) Sapporo	Ōkurayama HS134	LH	cancelled			
