= 2015–16 FIS Ski Jumping Alpen Cup =

Alpen Cup 2015/16
Discipline	Men	Women
Overall	(Germany) Jonathan Siegel	(Germany) Agnes Reich

Competition
Edition	26th	8th
Locations	2	4
Individual	10	12
Cancelled	7	8
Rescheduled	2	2

The 2015/16 FIS Ski Jumping Alpen Cup was the 26th Alpen Cup season in ski jumping for men and the 8th for ladies.

Other competitive circuits this season included the World Cup, Grand Prix, Continental Cup, FIS Cup and FIS Race.

== Calendar ==
=== Men ===
Season	Date	Place	Hill	Size	Winner	Second	Third	Ref.
1	5 September 2015	(Switzerland) Einsiedeln	Andreas Küttel Schanze HS117	LH	(Slovenia) Domen Prevc	(Germany) Tim Fuchs	(Austria) Markus Rupitsch	
2	6 September 2015	(Switzerland) Einsiedeln	Andreas Küttel Schanze HS117	LH	(Slovenia) Domen Prevc	(Germany) Tim Fuchs	(Austria) Markus Rupitsch	
3	26 September 2015	(Germany) Hinterzarten	Rothaus-Schanze HS108	NH	(Slovenia) Domen Prevc	(Italy) Alex Insam	(Germany) Jonathan Siegel	
4	27 September 2015	(Germany) Hinterzarten	Rothaus-Schanze HS108	NH	(Slovenia) Domen Prevc	(Slovenia) Žiga Jelar	(Austria) Clemens Leitner	
5	19 December 2015	(Austria) Seefeld	Toni-Seelos-Olympiaschanze HS109	NH	(Slovenia) Timi Zajc	(Germany) Jonathan Siegel	(Austria) Thomas Hofer	
6	20 December 2015	(Austria) Seefeld	Toni-Seelos-Olympiaschanze HS109	NH	(Germany) Jonathan Siegel	(Germany) Adrian Sell	(Slovenia) Bor Pavlovčič	
7	15 January 2016	(Germany) Oberwiesenthal	Fichtelbergschanzen HS106	NH	(Germany) Jonathan Siegel	(Slovenia) Jan Kus	(Austria) Clemens Leitner (Germany) Adrian Sell	
8	16 January 2016	(Germany) Oberwiesenthal	Fichtelbergschanzen HS106	NH	(France) Paul Brasme	(Slovenia) Jan Kus	(Germany) Paul Winter	
	16 January 2016	(Germany) Hinterzarten	Rothaus-Schanze HS108	NH	lack of snow; rescheduled to Oberwiesenthal			
	7 January 2016	(Germany) Hinterzarten	Rothaus-Schanze HS108	NH	lack of snow; rescheduled to Oberwiesenthal			
	13 February 2016	(Slovenia) Kranj	Bauhenk HS109	NH	lack of snow; rescheduled to Planica			
	14 February 2016	(Slovenia) Kranj	Bauhenk HS109	NH	lack of snow; rescheduled to Planica			
9	13 February 2016	(Slovenia) Planica	Normal hill HS104	NH	(Austria) Janni Reisenauer	(Italy) Alex Insam	(Slovenia) Rok Tarman	
10	14 February 2016	(Slovenia) Planica	Normal hill HS104	NH	(Austria) Janni Reisenauer	(Italy) Alex Insam	(Slovenia) Rok Tarman	
	12 March 2016	(Germany) Oberstdorf	Schattenbergschanze HS106	NH	postponed for one week to Baiersbronn			
	13 March 2016	(Germany) Oberstdorf	Schattenbergschanze HS106	NH	postponed for one week to Baiersbronn			
11	19 March 2016	(Germany) Baiersbronn	Ruhesteinschanze HS90	NH	(Germany) David Siegel	(Austria) Markus Rupitsch	(Austria) Clemens Leitner	
12	20 March 2016	(Germany) Baiersbronn	Ruhesteinschanze HS90	NH	(Germany) David Siegel	(Austria) Markus Rupitsch	(Austria) Mika Schwann	

=== Ladies ===
Season	Date	Place	Hill	Size	Winner	Second	Third	Ref.
1	9 August 2015	(Germany) Klingenthal	Vogtlandschanzen HS65	MH	(Germany) Agnes Reisch	(Czech Republic) Zdena Pesatova	(Austria) Julia Huber	
2	10 August 2015	(Germany) Klingenthal	Vogtlandschanzen HS65	MH	(Germany) Agnes Reisch	(Czech Republic) Zdena Pesatova	(Germany) Sophia Görlich	
3	12 August 2015	(Germany) Pöhla	Pöhlbachschanze HS65	MH	(Czech Republic) Zdena Pesatova	(Germany) Agnes Reisch	(Germany) Sophia Görlich	
4	13 August 2015	(Germany) Pöhla	Pöhlbachschanze HS65	MH	(Czech Republic) Zdena Pesatova	(Germany) Agnes Reisch	(Italy) Lara Malsiner	
5	15 August 2015	(Germany) Bischofsgrün	Ochsenkopfschanze HS71	MH	(Germany) Agnes Reisch	(Italy) Lara Malsiner	(Slovenia) Anita Seretinek	
6	16 August 2015	(Germany) Bischofsgrün	Ochsenkopfschanze HS71	MH	(Germany) Agnes Reisch	(Czech Republic) Zdena Pesatova	(Germany) Sophia Görlich	
7	5 September 2015	(Switzerland) Einsiedeln	Simon Ammann Schanze HS77	MH	(Slovenia) Nika Križnar	(Slovenia) Katra Komar	(Austria) Linda Grabner	
8	6 September 2015	(Switzerland) Einsiedeln	Simon Ammann Schanze HS77	MH	(Slovenia) Nika Križnar	(Slovenia) Katra Komar	(France) Lucile Morat	
	19 December 2015	(Germany) Rastbüchl	Baptist Kitzlinger Schanze HS79	MH	replaced in Villach			
	20 December 2015	(Germany) Rastbüchl	Baptist Kitzlinger Schanze HS79	MH	replaced in Villach			
	19 December 2015	(Austria) Villach	Villacher Alpenarena HS78	MH	lack of snow			
	20 December 2015	(Austria) Villach	Villacher Alpenarena HS78	MH	lack of snow			
9	9 January 2016	(Slovenia) Žiri	Nordijski center Račeva HS66	MH	(Italy) Lara Malsiner	(Slovenia) Nika Križnar	(France) Lucile Moarat	
10	10 January 2016	(Slovenia) Žiri	Nordijski center Račeva HS66	MH	(Slovenia) Nika Križnar	(Italy) Lara Malsiner	(Slovenia) Jerneja Brecl	
11	15 January 2016	(Germany) Oberwiesenthal	Fichtelbergschanzen HS106	NH	(Germany) Pauline Heßler	(Germany) Agnes Reisch	(Austria) Claudia Purker	
12	16 January 2016	(Germany) Oberwiesenthal	Fichtelbergschanzen HS106	NH	(Germany) Agnes Reisch	(Germany) Pauline Heßler	(Austria) Claudia Purker	
	16 January 2016	(Germany) Hinterzarten	Rothaus-Schanze HS108	NH	lack of snow; rescheduled to Oberwiesenthal			
	17 January 2016	(Germany) Hinterzarten	Rothaus-Schanze HS108	NH	lack of snow; rescheduled to Oberwiesenthal			
	12 March 2016	(Germany) Oberstdorf	Schattenbergschanze HS106	NH	postponed for one week			
	13 March 2016	(Germany) Oberstdorf	Schattenbergschanze HS106	NH	postponed for one week			
13	19 March 2016	(Germany) Baiersbronn	Ruhesteinschanze HS90	NH	(Germany) Luisa Görlich	(France) Lucile Morat	(Germany) Agnes Reisch	
14	20 March 2016	(Germany) Baiersbronn	Ruhesteinschanze HS90	NH	(Germany) Luisa Görlich	(France) Lucile Morat	(Germany) Agnes Reisch	

=== Men's team ===
Season	Date	Place	Hill	Size	Winner	Second	Third	Ref.
	15 January 2016	(Germany) Hinterzarten	Rothaus-Schanze HS108	NH	lack of snow			

== Overall standings ==
=== Men ===
Rank	after 12 events	Points
1	(Germany) Jonathan Siegel	503
2	(Germany) Adrian Sell	475
3	(Slovenia) Jan Kus	435
4	(Austria) Janni Reisenauer	426
5	(Italy) Alex Insam	426

=== Ladies ===
Rank	after 14 events	Points
1	(Germany) Agnes Reich	860
2	(Italy) Lara Malsiner	726
3	(Austria) Julia Huber	490
4	(Slovenia) Nika Križnar	486
5	(Czech Republic) Zdena Pešatová	476
