= Park Guy-lim =

South Korean ski jumper

Personal information
- Nationality: South Korean
- Born: 27 February 1999 (age 27) South Korea
- Education: Korea National Sport University

Sport
- Country: South Korea
- Sport: Ski jumping
- Coached by: Kang Chil-ku

Korean name
- Hangul: 박규림
- RR: Bak Gyurim
- MR: Pak Kyurim

Park Guy-lim (born 27 February 1999) is a South Korean ski jumper. Park competed at the 2018 Winter Olympics for South Korea.
