= Thomas Hofer =

Swiss swimmer

Personal information
- Born: 21 January 1958 (age 68)

Sport
- Sport: Swimming

Thomas Hofer (born 21 January 1958) is a Swiss former backstroke swimmer. He competed in two events at the 1976 Summer Olympics.
