= 2013–14 FIS Ski Jumping World Cup =

Ski jumping championship season

| Discipline | Men | Women |
| Overall | (Poland) Kamil Stoch | (Japan) Sara Takanashi |
| Nations Cup | Austria | Japan |
| Ski flying | (Slovenia) Peter Prevc | — |
| Four Hills Tournament | (Austria) Thomas Diethart | — |

Competition
| Edition | 35th | 3rd |
| Locations | 20 | 11 |
| Individual | 28 | 18 |
| Team | 4 | — |
| Mixed | 1 | 1 |
| Cancelled | 0 | 1 |
| Rescheduled | 1 | 2 |

The 2013–14 FIS Ski Jumping World Cup was the 35th World Cup season in ski jumping for men, the 17th official World Cup season in ski flying and the 3rd World Cup season for women.

Season began on 23 November 2013 in Klingenthal, Germany and ended on 23 March 2014 in Planica, Slovenia. Women's World Cup began on 7 December 2011 in Lillehammer, Norway and ended on 22 March 2014 in Planica, Slovenia.

Kamil Stoch won the men's overall title, leading overall standings for most of the season and managed to secure the title in the second-to-last event in Planica and also won most events of the season (six). He won his first overall and the first for Poland after Małysz in 2006.

The Four Hills Tournament was won by Thomas Diethart of Austria, who won events in Garmisch-Partenkirchen and Bischofshofen and finished third in Oberstdorf. Before the beginning of the Tournament, Diethart competed at only four World Cup events. This was a huge surprise, he was basically unknown to the wider audience.

Peaks of the season were Winter Olympics (premiere for women), FIS Ski Flying World Championships and the Four Hills Tournament.

Due to Planica's ski flying hill being renovated, the World Cup finals took place at HS139 hill instead of the HS215.

In women's cup, Sara Takanashi won 15 out of 18 events and secured her second consecutive overall title.

== Map of world cup hosts ==
Europe
| Germany | Austria | Asia |

== Men's Individual ==
=== Calendar ===
N – normal hill / L – large hill / F – flying hill
| All | No. | Date | Place (Hill) | Size | Winner | Second | Third | Overall leader | R. |
|---|---|---|---|---|---|---|---|---|---|
| 812 | 1 | (Note: Men's individual event in Klingenthal (24 November) had only one round due to strong wind.)24 November 2013 | (Germany) Klingenthal (Vogtland Arena HS140) | L _{567} | (Poland) Krzysztof Biegun | (Germany) Andreas Wellinger | (Slovenia) Jurij Tepeš | (Poland) Krzysztof Biegun | |
| 813 | 2 | 29 November 2013 | (Finland) Kuusamo (Rukatunturi) | L _{568} | (Austria) Gregor Schlierenzauer | (Germany) Marinus Kraus | (Austria) Thomas Morgenstern | (Poland) Krzysztof Biegun | |
| | | 30 November 2013 | (Finland) Kuusamo (Rukatunturi) | L _{cnx} | cancelled due to strong wind after 37 jumpers (wind and rescheduled to Lahti on 28 February) | | | — | |
| 814 | 3 | 7 December 2013 | (Norway) Lillehammer (Lysgårdsbakken HS100 / 138) | N _{149} | (Austria) Gregor Schlierenzauer | (Japan) Taku Takeuchi | (Germany) Richard Freitag | (Austria) G. Schlierenzauer | |
| 815 | 4 | 8 December 2013 | (Norway) Lillehammer (Lysgårdsbakken HS100 / 138) | L _{569} | (Germany) Severin Freund | (Norway) Anders Bardal | (Japan) Daiki Ito | (Austria) G. Schlierenzauer | |
| 816 | 5 | 14 December 2013 | (Germany) Titisee-Neustadt (Hochfirstschanze HS142) | L _{570} | (Austria) Thomas Morgenstern | (Poland) Kamil Stoch | (Switzerland) Simon Ammann | (Austria) G. Schlierenzauer | |
| 817 | 6 | 15 December 2013 | (Germany) Titisee-Neustadt (Hochfirstschanze HS142) | L _{571} | (Poland) Kamil Stoch | (Switzerland) Simon Ammann | (Japan) Noriaki Kasai | (Austria) G. Schlierenzauer | |
| 818 | 7 | 21 December 2013 | (Switzerland) Engelberg (Gross-Titlis-Schanze HS137) | L _{572} | (Poland) Jan Ziobro | (Poland) Kamil Stoch | (Norway) Anders Bardal | (Poland) Kamil Stoch | |
| 819 | 8 | 22 December 2013 | (Switzerland) Engelberg (Gross-Titlis-Schanze HS137) | L _{573} | (Poland) Kamil Stoch | (Germany) Andreas Wellinger | (Poland) Jan Ziobro | (Poland) Kamil Stoch | |
| 820 | 9 | 29 December 2013 | (Germany) Oberstdorf (Schattenbergschanze HS137) | L _{574} | (Switzerland) Simon Ammann | (Norway) Anders Bardal | (Austria) Thomas Diethart (Slovenia) Peter Prevc | (Poland) Kamil Stoch | |
| 821 | 10 | 1 January 2014 | (Germany) Garmisch-Pa (Gr. Olympiaschanze HS140) | L _{575} | (Austria) Thomas Diethart | (Austria) Thomas Morgenstern | (Switzerland) Simon Ammann | (Poland) Kamil Stoch | |
| 822 | 11 | (Note: Men's individual event in Innsbruck (4 January) had only one round due to strong wind.)4 January 2014 | (Austria) Innsbruck (Bergiselschanze HS130) | L _{576} | (Finland) Anssi Koivuranta | (Switzerland) Simon Ammann | (Poland) Kamil Stoch | (Poland) Kamil Stoch | |
| 823 | 12 | 6 January 2014 | (Austria) Bischofshofen (Paul-Ausserleitner HS140) | L _{577} | (Austria) Thomas Diethart | (Slovenia) Peter Prevc | (Austria) Thomas Morgenstern | (Poland) Kamil Stoch | |
| 62nd Four Hills Tournament Overall (29 December 2013 – 6 January 2014) | | | | | (Austria) Thomas Diethart | (Austria) Thomas Morgenstern | (Switzerland) Simon Ammann | 4H Tournament | |
| 824 | 13 | 11 January 2014 | (Austria) Bad Mitterndorf (Kulm HS200) | F _{098} | (Japan) Noriaki Kasai | (Slovenia) Peter Prevc | (Austria) Gregor Schlierenzauer | (Poland) Kamil Stoch | |
| 825 | 14 | 12 January 2014 | (Austria) Bad Mitterndorf (Kulm HS200) | F _{099} | (Slovenia) Peter Prevc | (Austria) Gregor Schlierenzauer | (Japan) Noriaki Kasai | (Poland) Kamil Stoch | |
| 826 | 15 | 16 January 2014 | (Poland) Wisła (Malinka HS134) | L _{578} | (Germany) Andreas Wellinger | (Poland) Kamil Stoch | (Austria) Michael Hayböck | (Poland) Kamil Stoch | |
| 827 | 16 | (Note: Men's individual event in Zakopane (19 January) had only one round due to strong wind.)19 January 2014 | (Poland) Zakopane (Wielka Krokiew HS134) | L _{579} | (Norway) Anders Bardal | (Slovenia) Peter Prevc | (Germany) Richard Freitag | (Poland) Kamil Stoch | |
| 828 | 17 | 25 January 2014 | (Japan) Sapporo (Ōkurayama HS134) | L _{580} | (Slovenia) Peter Prevc | (Slovenia) Jernej Damjan | (Japan) Noriaki Kasai | (Slovenia) Peter Prevc | |
| 829 | 18 | 26 January 2014 | (Japan) Sapporo (Ōkurayama HS134) | L _{581} | (Slovenia) Jernej Damjan | (Slovenia) Peter Prevc | (Slovenia) Robert Kranjec | (Slovenia) Peter Prevc | |
| 830 | 19 | 1 February 2014 | (Germany) Willingen (Mühlenkopfschanze HS145) | L _{582} | (Poland) Kamil Stoch | (Germany) Severin Freund | (Slovenia) Jernej Damjan | (Slovenia) Peter Prevc | |
| 831 | 20 | 2 February 2014 | (Germany) Willingen (Mühlenkopfschanze HS145) | L _{583} | (Poland) Kamil Stoch | (Germany) Severin Freund | (Slovenia) Peter Prevc | (Poland) Kamil Stoch | |
2014 Winter Olympics (9 – 15 February • (Russia) Sochi)
| 832 | 21 | 26 February 2014 | (Sweden) Falun (Lugnet HS134) | L _{584} | (Germany) Severin Freund | (Slovenia) Peter Prevc | (Japan) Noriaki Kasai | (Slovenia) Peter Prevc | |
| 833 | 22 | 28 February 2014 | (Finland) Lahti (Salpausselkä HS130) | L _{585} | (Germany) Severin Freund | (Austria) Stefan Kraft | (Poland) Kamil Stoch | (Slovenia) Peter Prevc | |
| 834 | 23 | 2 March 2014 | (Finland) Lahti (Salpausselkä HS130) | L _{586} | (Poland) Kamil Stoch | (Germany) Severin Freund | (Austria) Gregor Schlierenzauer | (Poland) Kamil Stoch | |
| 835 | 24 | 4 March 2014 | (Finland) Kuopio (Puijo HS127) | L _{587} | (Poland) Kamil Stoch | (Germany) Severin Freund | (Norway) Anders Bardal | (Poland) Kamil Stoch | |
| 836 | 25 | 7 March 2014 | (Norway) Trondheim (Granåsen HS140) | L _{588} | (Norway) Anders Bardal | (Austria) Andreas Kofler | (Japan) Noriaki Kasai | (Poland) Kamil Stoch | |
| 837 | 26 | 9 March 2014 | (Norway) Oslo (Holmenkollbakken HS134) | L _{589} | (Germany) Severin Freund | (Norway) Anders Bardal | (Poland) Kamil Stoch | (Poland) Kamil Stoch | |
FIS Ski Flying World Championships 2014 (14 March • (Czech Republic) Harrachov)
| 838 | 27 | 21 March 2014 | (Slovenia) Planica (Bloudkova velikanka HS139) | L _{590} | (Germany) Severin Freund | (Norway) Anders Bardal | (Slovenia) Peter Prevc | (Poland) Kamil Stoch | |
| 839 | 28 | 23 March 2014 | (Slovenia) Planica (Bloudkova velikanka HS139) | L _{591} | (Slovenia) Peter Prevc | (Germany) Severin Freund | (Norway) Anders Bardal | (Poland) Kamil Stoch | |
| 35th FIS World Cup Men's Overall (24 November 2013 – 23 March 2014) | | | | | (Poland) Kamil Stoch | (Slovenia) Peter Prevc | (Germany) Severin Freund | World Cup Overall | |

=== Standings ===
==== Overall ====
| Rank | after 28 events | Points |
|---|---|---|
| 1 | (Poland) Kamil Stoch | 1420 |
| 2 | (Slovenia) Peter Prevc | 1312 |
| 3 | (Germany) Severin Freund | 1303 |
| 4 | (Norway) Anders Bardal | 1071 |
| 5 | (Japan) Noriaki Kasai | 1062 |
| 6 | (Austria) Gregor Schlierenzauer | 943 |
| 7 | (Switzerland) Simon Ammann | 733 |
| 8 | (Austria) Thomas Diethart | 666 |
| 9 | (Germany) Andreas Wellinger | 601 |
| 10 | (Austria) Stefan Kraft | 539 |

==== Ski Flying ====
| Rank | after 2 events | Points |
|---|---|---|
| 1 | (Slovenia) Peter Prevc | 180 |
| 2 | (Japan) Noriaki Kasai | 160 |
| 3 | (Austria) Gregor Schlierenzauer | 140 |
| 4 | (Switzerland) Simon Ammann | 74 |
| 5 | (Slovenia) Jurij Tepeš | 72 |
| | (Germany) Severin Freund | 72 |
| 7 | (Poland) Kamil Stoch | 69 |
| 8 | (Czechoslovakia) Jan Matura | 60 |
| 9 | (Slovenia) Robert Kranjec | 58 |
| 10 | (Norway) Anders Fannemel | 56 |

==== Nations Cup ====
| Rank | after 33 events | Points |
|---|---|---|
| 1 | Austria | 5407 |
| 2 | Germany | 4735 |
| 3 | Slovenia | 4402 |
| 4 | Poland | 3790 |
| 5 | Norway | 3162 |
| 6 | Japan | 2685 |
| 7 | Czech Republic | 1337 |
| 8 | Finland | 1090 |
| 9 | Switzerland | 957 |
| 10 | Russia | 254 |

==== Four Hills tournament ====
| Rank | after 4 events | Points |
|---|---|---|
| 1 | (Austria) Thomas Diethart | 1012.6 |
| 2 | (Austria) Thomas Morgenstern | 994.3 |
| 3 | (Switzerland) Simon Ammann | 992.4 |
| 4 | (Slovenia) Peter Prevc | 971.3 |
| 5 | (Japan) Noriaki Kasai | 962.1 |
| 6 | (Norway) Anders Bardal | 950.6 |
| 7 | (Poland) Kamil Stoch | 938.2 |
| 8 | (Austria) Gregor Schlierenzauer | 932.0 |
| 9 | (Austria) Michael Hayböck | 906.8 |
| 10 | (Germany) Andreas Wellinger | 895.7 |

==== Prize money ====
| Rank | after 33 events | CHF |
|---|---|---|
| 1 | (Poland) Kamil Stoch | 147,500 |
| 2 | (Germany) Severin Freund | 146,450 |
| 3 | (Slovenia) Peter Prevc | 145,600 |
| 4 | (Norway) Anders Bardal | 120,300 |
| 5 | (Austria) Gregor Schlierenzauer | 119,150 |
| 6 | (Japan) Noriaki Kasai | 110,700 |
| 7 | (Austria) Thomas Diethart | 85,600 |
| 8 | (Germany) Andreas Wellinger | 76,550 |
| 9 | (Switzerland) Simon Ammann | 73,250 |
| 10 | (Austria) Stefan Kraft | 68,800 |

== Women's Individual ==
=== Calendar ===
N – normal hill / L – large hill
| All | No. | Date | Place (Hill) | Size | Winner | Second | Third | Overall leader | R. |
|---|---|---|---|---|---|---|---|---|---|
| 30 | 1 | 7 December 2013 | (Norway) Lillehammer (Lysgårdsbakken HS100) | N _{029} | (Japan) Sara Takanashi | (Austria) D. Iraschko-Stolz (Germany) Gianina Ernst | | (Japan) Sara Takanashi | |
| 31 | 2 | 21 December 2013 | (Germany) Hinterzarten (Rothaus-Schanze HS108) | N _{030} | (Japan) Sara Takanashi | (Austria) D. Iraschko-Stolz | (Russia) Irina Avvakumova | (Japan) Sara Takanashi | |
| 32 | 3 | 22 December 2013 | (Germany) Hinterzarten (Rothaus-Schanze HS108) | N _{031} | (Japan) Sara Takanashi | (Russia) Irina Avvakumova | (Germany) Carina Vogt | (Japan) Sara Takanashi | |
| 33 | 4 | 3 January 2014 | (Russia) Chaykovsky (Snezhinka HS106) | N _{032} | (Japan) Sara Takanashi | (Germany) Carina Vogt | (Russia) Irina Avvakumova | (Japan) Sara Takanashi | |
| 34 | 5 | 4 January 2014 | (Russia) Chaykovsky (Snezhinka HS106) | N _{033} | (Russia) Irina Avvakumova | (Germany) Carina Vogt | (Japan) Sara Takanashi | (Japan) Sara Takanashi | |
| 35 | 6 | 11 January 2014 | (Japan) Sapporo (Miyanomori HS100) | N _{034} | (Japan) Sara Takanashi | (Germany) Carina Vogt | (Russia) Irina Avvakumova | (Japan) Sara Takanashi | |
| 36 | 7 | 12 January 2014 | (Japan) Sapporo (Miyanomori HS100) | N _{035} | (Japan) Sara Takanashi | (France) Coline Mattel | (Russia) Irina Avvakumova | (Japan) Sara Takanashi | |
| 37 | 8 | 18 January 2014 | (Japan) Zaō (Yamagata HS100) | N _{036} | (Japan) Sara Takanashi | (Japan) Yuki Ito | (Germany) Carina Vogt | (Japan) Sara Takanashi | |
| 38 | 9 | 19 January 2014 | (Japan) Zaō (Yamagata HS100) | N _{037} | (Japan) Sara Takanashi | (Germany) Carina Vogt | (Switzerland) Bigna Windmüller | (Japan) Sara Takanashi | |
| | | 25 January 2014 | (Slovenia) Ljubno (Savina HS95) | N _{cnx} | cancelled due to lack of snow and high temperatures (rescheduled to Planica on 25 and 26 January) | | | — | |
| | | 26 January 2014 | (Slovenia) Ljubno (Savina HS95) | N _{cnx} | cancelled due to lack of snow and high temperatures (rescheduled to Planica on 25 and 26 January) | | | — | |
| 39 | 10 | (Note: Women's individual cancelled event in Ljubno (25 January) was rescheduled to Planica on the same day.)25 January 2014 | (Slovenia) Planica (Normal hill HS104) | N _{038} | (Austria) D. Iraschko-Stolz | (Japan) Sara Takanashi | (Germany) Carina Vogt | (Japan) Sara Takanashi | |
| 40 | 11 | (Note: Women's individual cancelled event in Ljubno (26 January) was rescheduled to Planica on the same day.)26 January 2014 | (Slovenia) Planica (Normal hill HS104) | N _{039} | (Austria) D. Iraschko-Stolz | (Japan) Sara Takanashi | (Germany) Carina Vogt | (Japan) Sara Takanashi | |
| 41 | 12 | 1 February 2014 | (Austria) Hinzenbach (Aigner-Schanze HS94) | N _{040} | (Japan) Sara Takanashi | (Austria) D. Iraschko-Stolz | (Slovenia) Maja Vtič | (Japan) Sara Takanashi | |
| 42 | 13 | 2 February 2014 | (Austria) Hinzenbach (Aigner-Schanze HS94) | N _{041} | (Japan) Sara Takanashi | (Austria) D. Iraschko-Stolz | (Finland) Julia Kykkänen | (Japan) Sara Takanashi | |
2014 Winter Olympics (11 February • (Russia) Sochi)
| 43 | 14 | 1 March 2014 | (Romania) Râșnov (Trambulina Valea HS100) | N _{042} | (Japan) Sara Takanashi | (Norway) Maren Lundby | (Japan) Yuki Ito | (Japan) Sara Takanashi | |
| 44 | 15 | 2 March 2014 | (Romania) Râșnov (Trambulina Valea HS100) | N _{043} | (Japan) Sara Takanashi | (United States) Jessica Jerome | (Italy) Evelyn Insam | (Japan) Sara Takanashi | |
| 45 | 16 | 8 March 2014 | (Norway) Oslo (Holmenkollbakken HS134) | L _{002} | (Japan) Sara Takanashi | (Slovenia) Katja Požun | (Japan) Yuki Ito | (Japan) Sara Takanashi | |
| 46 | 17 | 15 March 2014 | (Sweden) Falun (Lugnet HS100) | N _{044} | (Japan) Sara Takanashi | (Japan) Yuki Ito | (Finland) Julia Kykkänen | (Japan) Sara Takanashi | |
| | | 16 March 2014 | (Sweden) Falun (Lugnet HS100) | N _{cnx} | cancelled due to strong wind | | | — | |
| 47 | 18 | 22 March 2014 | (Slovenia) Planica (Bloudkova velikanka HS139) | L _{003} | (Japan) Sara Takanashi | (Japan) Yuki Ito | (France) Julia Clair | (Japan) Sara Takanashi | |
| 3rd FIS World Cup Women's Overall (7 December 2013 – 22 March 2014) | | | | | (Japan) Sara Takanashi | (Japan) Yuki Ito | (Germany) Carina Vogt | World Cup Overall | |

=== Standings ===
==== Overall ====
| Rank | after 18 events | Points |
|---|---|---|
| 1 | (Japan) Sara Takanashi | 1720 |
| 2 | (Germany) Carina Vogt | 806 |
| 3 | (Japan) Yuki Ito | 759 |
| 4 | (Russia) Irina Avvakumova | 731 |
| 5 | (Austria) Daniela Iraschko-Stolz | 682 |
| 6 | (Slovenia) Maja Vtič | 542 |
| 7 | (Norway) Maren Lundby | 487 |
| 8 | (France) Coline Mattel | 453 |
| 9 | (Finland) Julia Kykkänen | 429 |
| 10 | (United States) Jessica Jerome | 374 |

==== Nations Cup ====
| Rank | after 19 events | Points |
|---|---|---|
| 1 | Japan | 2981 |
| 2 | Germany | 2364 |
| 3 | Slovenia | 1933 |
| 4 | Norway | 1464 |
| 5 | Austria | 1031 |
| 6 | France | 1005 |
| 7 | Russia | 818 |
| 8 | Italy | 546 |
| 9 | United States | 542 |
| 10 | Finland | 455 |

==== Prize money ====
| Rank | after 19 events | CHF |
|---|---|---|
| 1 | (Japan) Sara Takanashi | 59,100 |
| 2 | (Japan) Yuki Ito | 29,640 |
| 3 | (Austria) Daniela Iraschko-Stolz | 25,660 |
| 4 | (Germany) Carina Vogt | 24,180 |
| 5 | (Russia) Irina Avvakumova | 21,090 |
| 6 | (Norway) Maren Lundby | 17,925 |
| 7 | (Slovenia) Maja Vtič | 15,780 |
| 8 | (France) Coline Mattel | 12,780 |
| 9 | (Finland) Julia Kykkänen | 12,060 |
| 10 | (United States) Jessica Jerome | 10,860 |

== Team events ==
=== Calendar ===
| All | No. | Date | Place (Hill) | Size | Winner | Second | Third | R. |
Men's team
| 67 | 1 | (Note: Men's team event in Klingenthal (23 November) had only one round due to strong wind conditions.)23 November 2013 | (Germany) Klingenthal (Vogtland Arena HS140) | L _{050} | Slovenia Jurij Tepeš; Robert Kranjec; Jaka Hvala; Peter Prevc | Germany Andreas Wank; Karl Geiger; Andreas Wellinger; Severin Freund | Japan Daiki Ito; Reruhi Shimizu; Noriaki Kasai; Taku Takeuchi | |
| 68 | 2 | 18 January 2014 | (Poland) Zakopane (Wielka Krokiew HS134) | L _{051} | Slovenia Jurij Tepeš; Robert Kranjec; Jernej Damjan; Peter Prevc | Germany Andreas Wank; Richard Freitag; Andreas Wellinger; Severin Freund | Austria Michael Hayböck; Manuel Poppinger; Thomas Diethart; Gregor Schlierenzauer | |
| 69 | 3 | 1 March 2014 | (Finland) Lahti (Salpausselkä HS130) | L _{052} | Austria Thomas Diethart; Stefan Kraft; Michael Hayböck; Gregor Schlierenzauer | Germany Andreas Wank; Marinus Kraus; Andreas Wellinger; Severin Freund | Norway Anders Fannemel; Andreas Stjernen; Rune Velta; Anders Bardal | |
| 70 | 4 | 22 March 2014 | (Slovenia) Planica (Bloudkova velikanka HS139) | L _{053} | Austria Stefan Kraft; Andreas Kofler; Thomas Diethart; Gregor Schlierenzauer | Poland Maciej Kot; Piotr Żyła; Klemens Murańka; Kamil Stoch | Norway Andreas Stjernen; Tom Hilde; Anders Fannemel; Anders Bardal | |
Mixed team
| 2 | 1 | 6 December 2013 | (Norway) Lillehammer (Lysgårdsbakken HS100) | N _{002} | Japan Yūki Itō; Daiki Itō; Sara Takanashi; Taku Takeuchi | Austria J. Seifriedsberger; Thomas Morgenstern; Daniela Iraschko-Stolz; Gregor Schlierenzauer | Norway Maren Lundby; Rune Velta; Anette Sagen; Anders Bardal | |

== Achievements ==
First World Cup career victory

- (Poland) Krzysztof Biegun, 19, in his 2nd season – the WC 1 in Klingenthal; it also was his first podium
- (Poland) Jan Ziobro, 22, in his 3rd season – the WC 8 in Engelberg; it also was his first podium
- (Austria) Thomas Diethart, 21, in his 4th season – the WC 11 in Garmisch-Partenkirchen; first podium was 2013–14 WC 10 in Oberstdorf
- (Finland) Anssi Koivuranta, 25, in his 5th season – the WC 12 in Innsbruk; it also was his first podium
- (Russia) Irina Avvakumova, 22, in her 1st season – the WC 5 in Chaykovsky; first podium was 2013–14 WC 2 in Hinterzarten
- (Slovenia) Peter Prevc, 21, in his 5th season – the WC 15 in Bad Mitterndorf; first podium was 2012–13 WC 27 in Planica
- (Germany) Andreas Wellinger, 18, in his 2nd season – the WC 16 in Wisła; first podium was 2012–13 WC 5 in Sochi
- (Slovenia) Jernej Damjan, 30, in his 11th season – the WC 22 in Sapporo; first podium was 2006–07 WC 17 in Willingen

First World Cup podium

- (Germany) Marinus Kraus, 22, in his 2nd season – no. 2 in the WC 2 in Kuusamo
- (Germany) Gianina Ernst, 14, in her 1st season – no. 2 in the WC 1 in Lillehammer
- (Russia) Irina Avvakumova, 22, in her 1st season – no. 3 in the WC 2 in Hinterzarten
- (Finland) Julia Kykkänen, 19, in her 3rd season – no. 3 in the WC 7 in Hinzenbach
- (Austria) Thomas Diethart, 21, in his 4th season – no. 3 in the WC 10 in Obersdorf
- (Austria) Michael Hayböck, 22, in his 5th season – no. 3 in the WC 15 in Wisła

Victory in this World Cup (in brackets victory for all time)

- (Japan) Sara Takanashi, 15 (24) first places
- (Poland) Kamil Stoch, 6 (13) first places
- (Germany) Severin Freund, 5 (9) first places
- (Slovenia) Peter Prevc, 3 (3) first places
- (Austria) Gregor Schlierenzauer, 2 (52) first places
- (Austria) Thomas Diethart, 2 (2) first places
- (Austria) Thomas Morgenstern, 1 (23) first places
- (Switzerland) Simon Ammann, 1 (21) first places
- (Japan) Noriaki Kasai, 1 (16) first places
- (Norway) Anders Bardal, 1 (6) first places
- (Austria) Daniela Iraschko-Stolz, 1 (4) first places
- (Poland) Krzysztof Biegun, 1 (1) first place
- (Poland) Jan Ziobro, 1 (1) first place
- (Finland) Anssi Koivuranta, 1 (1) first place
- (Russia) Irina Avvakumova, 1 (1) first place
- (Germany) Andreas Wellinger, 1 (1) first place
- (Slovenia) Jernej Damjan, 1 (1) first place

== Retirements ==
Following are notable ski-jumpers who announced their retirement:

- (Austria) Thomas Morgenstern – after 12 seasons
- (Austria) Martin Koch – after 16 seasons
- (Germany) Martin Schmitt – after 18 seasons
- (Norway) Bjørn Einar Romøren – after 14 seasons

== See also ==
- 2013 Grand Prix (top level summer series)
- 2013–14 FIS Continental Cup (2nd level competition)
