= Nina Lussi =

American ski jumper (born 1994)

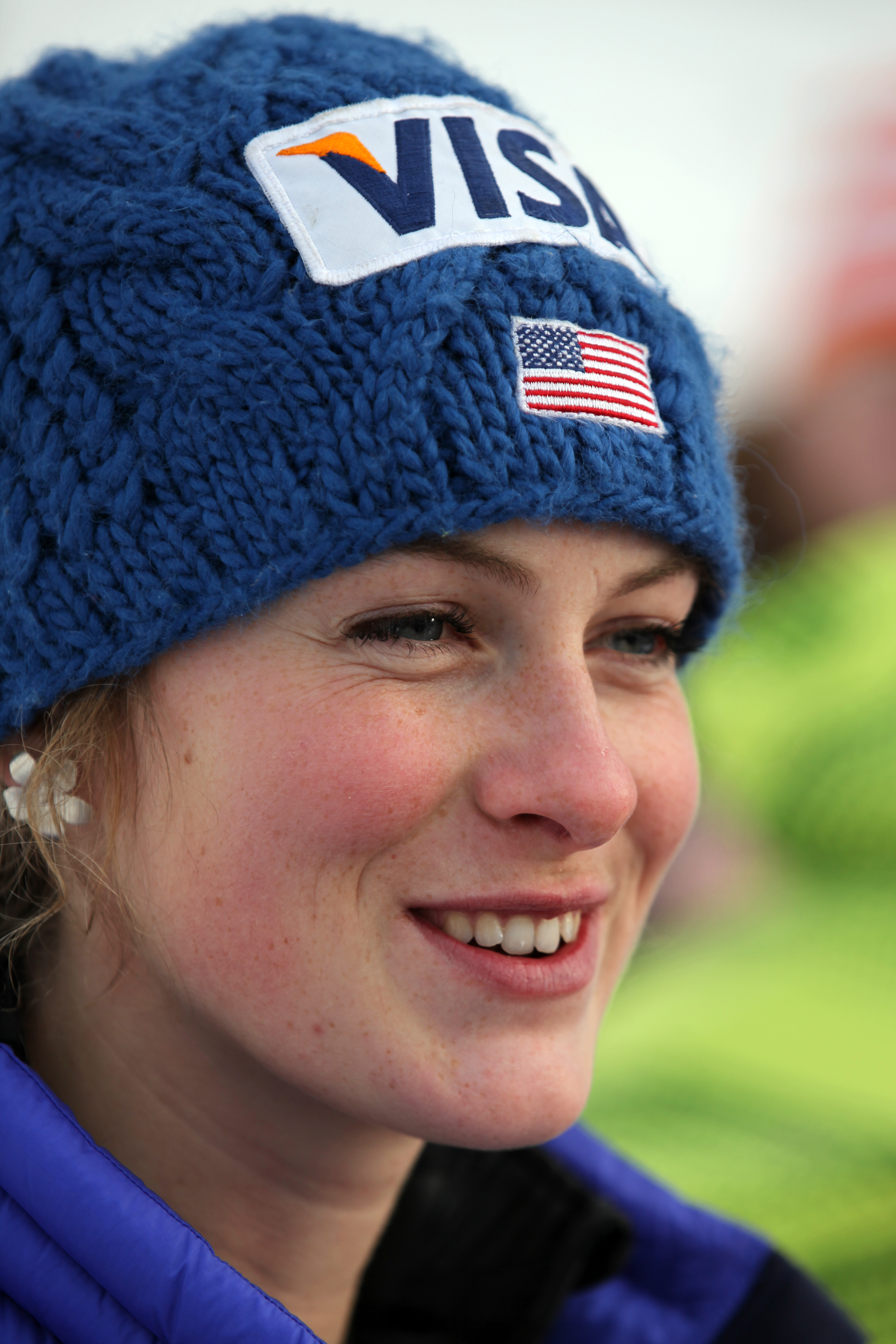
- Lussi in 2013

Personal information
- Born: March 29, 1994 (age 32) Lake Placid, New York, U.S.
- Height: 5 ft 10 in (178 cm)

Sport
- Sport: Skiing
- Club: New York Ski Educational Foundation

World Cup career
- Seasons: 2012-
- Indiv. podiums: 0
- Indiv. wins: 0

Achievements and titles
- Personal best: 135m
- Updated on January 13, 2013

Nina Lussi (born March 29, 1994, in Lake Placid, New York) is an American ski jumper and four-time national champion.

As a young jumper, Lussi won several Junior Olympic titles in Special Jumping and Nordic Combined. She also competed in track and field in the 400 meters and triple jump. Her debut on the international circuit was in 2009 at the Junior World Championships in Strebske Pleso, Slovakia, where she placed 26th. Nina Lussi graduated from the Austrian Schigymnasium Stams in 2013 and went on to study business at the University of Utah.

Lussi's best results are the Continental Cup competitions in Falun, Sweden (March 1, 2014, March 2, 2014), where she placed 1st and 2nd respectively. Her first World Cup start was in Hinzenbach, Austria (February 4, 2012). Lussi's personal best is 135 meters in Planica, Slovenia.

Nina Lussi is the great-granddaughter of famous figure skating coach Gustave Lussi. She has two siblings Miles and Danielle who are inactive ski jumpers. Miles is a water skier at California Polytechnic State University, San Luis Obispo. Danielle is a student at Harvard University and is on the polo team as well as a writer for The Harvard Crimson.
