= Sebastian Bradatsch =

German ski jumper

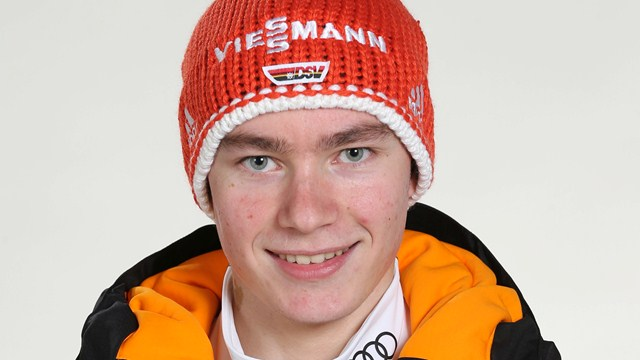

Personal information
- Born: May 8, 1996 (age 30) Magdeburg, Germany
- Height: 1.67 m (5 ft 6 in)

Sport
- Sport: Skiing
- Club: WSC 07 Ruhla

World Cup career
- Seasons: 2011–present
- Indiv. podiums: 2
- Indiv. wins: 1

Sebastian Bradatsch (born 8 May 1996) is a German ski jumper who has been competing since 2011.

== Career ==
International debut of Sebastian Bradatsch took place on February 26, 2011 in German town of Baiersbronn. After that he featured several competitions including Alpencup. In 2012 Bradatsch succeeded in scoring two jumping hills records: in Schonach (106,5 meter) and Oberstdorf (also 106,5 meter). Year 2013 was successful for him as well. Participation in 2013 European Youth Olympic Winter Festival in Romanian Râșno brought Sebastian Bradatsch gold medal in Mixed-Team and silver in Team competition. In the end of 2013 he participated as a part of German national team (in Qualification) in jumping during new year season with no access to world championships. At Junior World Championships 2014 in Val di Fiemme he passed a bit to get a medal and was ranked as fourth. At same championship he reached 5th place in Team competition with Paul Winter, Michael Herrmann und Dominik Mayländer. Four Hills Tournament 2014/15 was featured by Sebastian Bradatsch as a part of German team in Oberstdorf and Garmisch-Partenkirchen. Management: 24passion GbR
