= Matjaž Pungertar =

Slovenian ski jumper (born 1990)

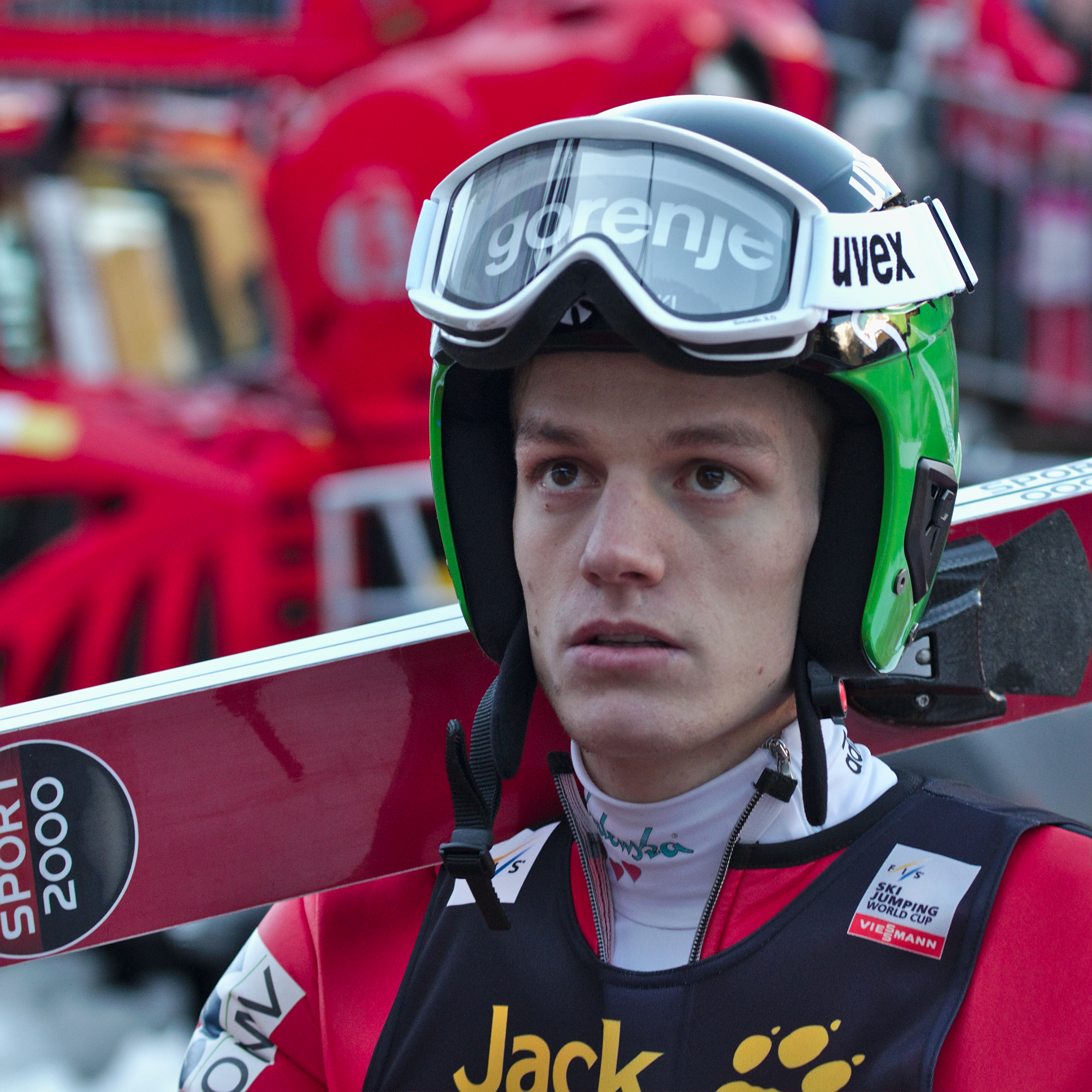

Personal information
- Full name: Matjaž Pungertar
- Born: 14 August 1990 (age 35) Ljubljana, SFR Yugoslavia

Sport
- Sport: Skiing
- Club: SSK Mengeš

World Cup career
- Seasons: 2012–2015
- Indiv. starts: 60
- Updated on 28 February 2016

Matjaž Pungertar (born 14 August 1990) is a Slovenian ski jumper. He competed in the 2015 World Cup season and represented Slovenia at the FIS Nordic World Ski Championships 2015 in Falun.
