= David Siegel (ski jumper) =

German ski jumper

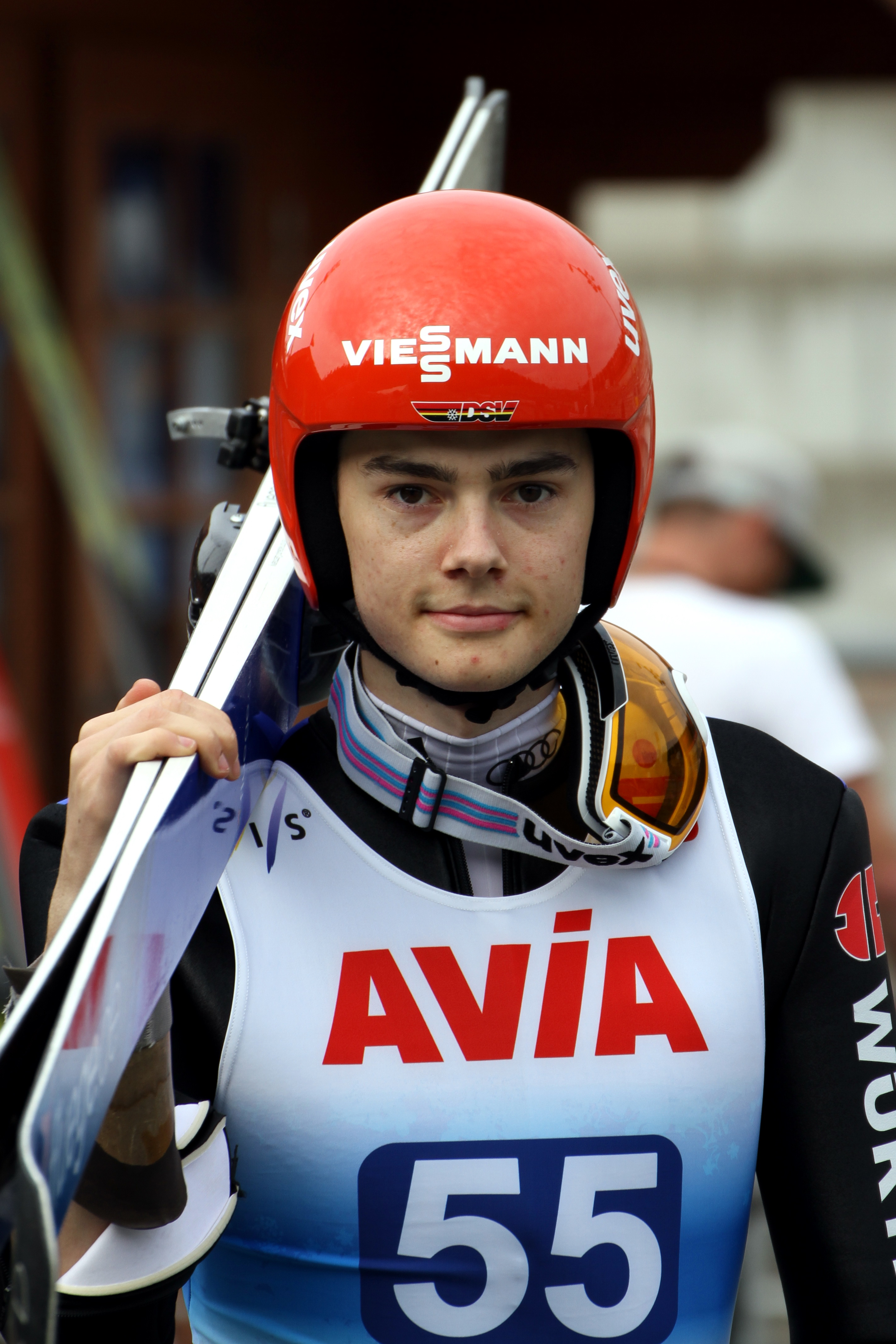

Personal information
- Nationality: Germany
- Born: 28 August 1996 (age 29)
- Height: 1.82 m (6 ft 0 in)

Sport
- Sport: Skiing
- Club: SV Baiersbronn

World Cup career
- Indiv. starts: 32
- Team starts: 1
- Team podiums: 1
- Team wins: 1

Achievements and titles
- Personal bests: 192.5 m (632 ft); Vikersund, 16 March 2018
Medal record
Men's ski jumping
Representing Germany
Junior World Championships
Gold medal – first place	2016 Râșnov	Individual NH
Gold medal – first place	2016 Râșnov	Team NH
Bronze medal – third place	2016 Râșnov	Mixed Team NH
- Updated on 27 March 2023

David Siegel (born 28 August 1996) is a German former ski jumper and representative of the club SV Baiersbronn. We was three-time medalist at the 2016 Nordic Junior World Ski Championships, with gold individually and as a team, and bronze in the mixed team competition.

== Career ==
Siegel starts for SV Baiersbronn. He began his international career on 25 and 26 February 2012 with two competitions in the FIS Cup in Baiersbronn, where he finished fourth and eighth. In August of the same year, Siegel competed for the first time in the Alpine Ski Jumping Cup in Einsiedeln. On 16 and 17 August 2014, Siegel made his debut in the Continental Cup in Kuopio. He finished 19th and 40th in these competitions. Since then, regular appearances in the FIS, Alpine and Continental Cup followed.

On 19 and 20 December 2015, Siegel achieved his best results so far in the Continental Cup in Rovaniemi, Finland. After finishing eighth on 19 December, Siegel won the second competition the following day, earning his first Continental Cup victory. Federal coach Werner Schuster nominated him for the first time in the national group in the competitions of the 2015–16 Four Hills Tournament. In Oberstdorf, however, he retired in the qualifying. In the second competition of the tour in Garmisch-Partenkirchen, he finished 16th and won his first World Cup points.

In October 2016, Siegel won the German Championships 2016 in Oberhof ahead of Andreas Wellinger and Richard Freitag in the absence of previous year's winner Severin Freund.

He finished the 2018–19 Four Hills Tournament in 22nd place overall. The best individual result of his career so far was achieved on the weekend after the 4-Hills Tournament with fifth place in Val di Fiemme, Italy. On 19 January 2019, Siegel achieved his first World Cup victory together with Karl Geiger, Markus Eisenbichler and Stephan Leyhe in the team competition in Zakopane. In the second round, however, he crashed hard after landing and suffered a cruciate ligament tear, which meant the season's out. Also the following season missed seals due to this injury, in which also the inner ligament, the meniscus and even more in the right knee ripped. In his comeback in August 2020 at the Grand Prix in Wisła, Siegel reached the points.

On 30 May 2023, Siegel announced the end of his athletic career.

=== Team victories ===
	Day	Year	Location	Hill	Point K	HS	Jump 1	Jump 2	Note (points)
1.	19 January	2019	Zakopane	Wielka Krokiew	K-125	HS-140	135,0 m	142,5 m	1157.5 (268.6)
