= Andraž Pograjc =

Slovenian ski jumper

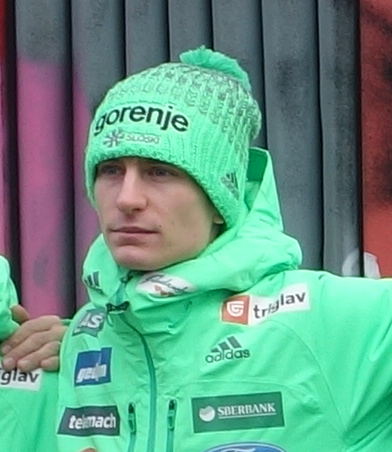

Personal information
- Full name: Andraž Pograjc
- Born: 26 September 1991 (age 34) Trbovlje, Slovenia

Sport
- Sport: Skiing
- Club: SSK Costella Ilirija

World Cup career
- Seasons: 2013–
- Indiv. podiums: 0 (+1 team)
- Indiv. wins: 0 (+1 team)

Achievements and titles
- Personal best: 212.5 m (Planica 2013)
- Updated on 23 March 2013

Andraž Pograjc (born 26 September 1991 in Trbovlje) is a Slovenian ski jumper.

== Career ==
Pograjc is a member of club SSK Costella Ilirija. His world cup debut was on March 10, 2013 in Lahti where he reached 30th place and his first WC points.

In the 2013 Planica world cup ski flying event he reached 17th place individual, personal best jump at 212.5 meters and his best world cup career result, 1st place in team event.

== World Cup ==
=== Team podiums ===
Season	Date	Location	Place
2012–13	23 Mar 2013	Planica, Slovenia	1st
