= Thomas Diethart =

Austrian ski jumper (born 1992)

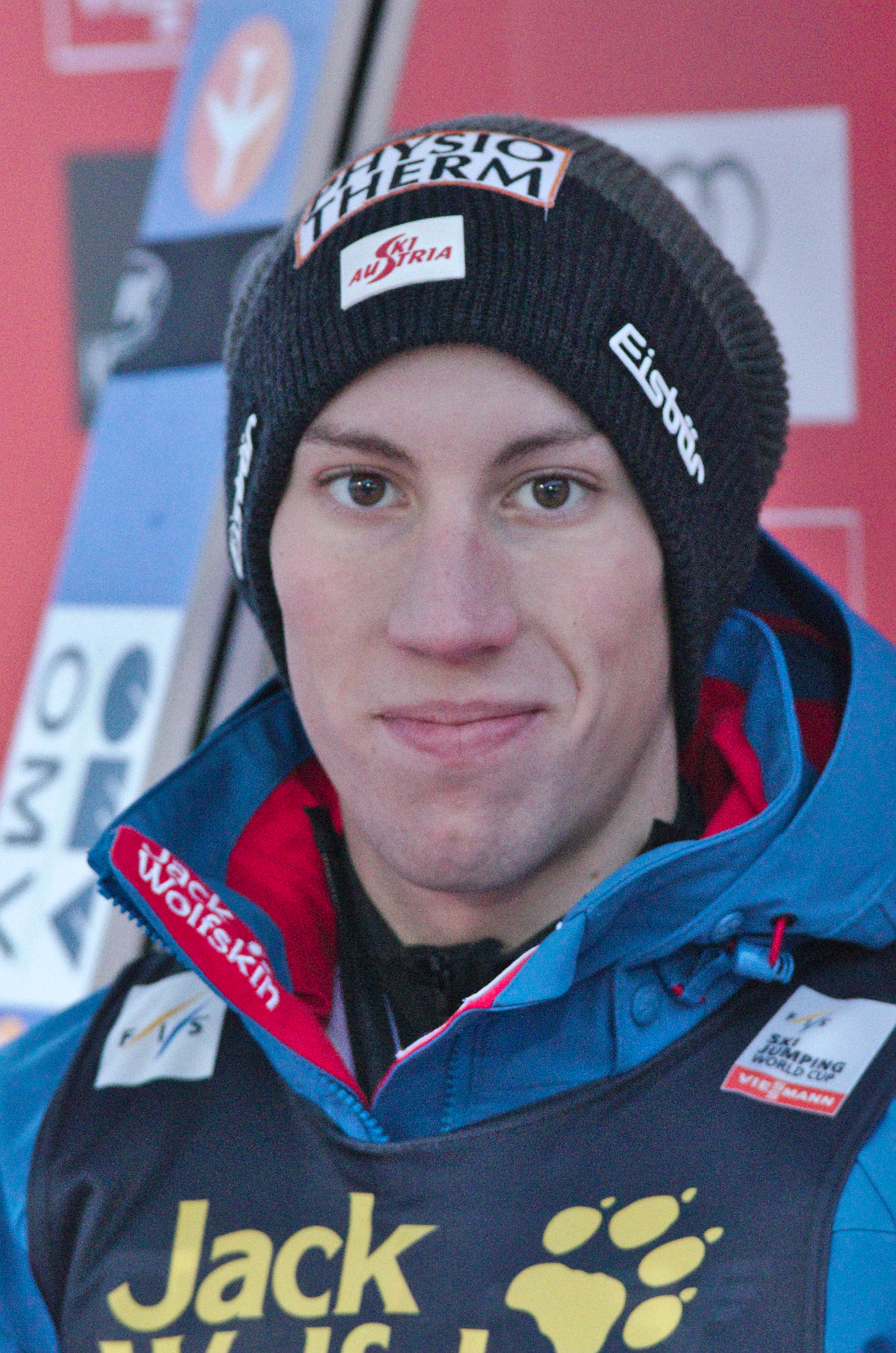
- Diethart in Engelberg, 2014

Personal information
- Nationality: Austria
- Born: 25 February 1992 (age 34) Tulln an der Donau, Austria
- Height: 1.72 m (5 ft 8 in)

Sport
- Sport: Skiing

World Cup career
- Seasons: 2011; 2014–2015
- Indiv. starts: 41
- Indiv. podiums: 3
- Indiv. wins: 2
- Team starts: 4
- Team podiums: 4
- Team wins: 2
- Four Hills titles: 1 (2014)

Achievements and titles
- Personal bests: 192.5 m (632 ft); Harrachov, 13 March 2014
Medal record
Men's ski jumping
Olympic Games
Silver medal – second place	2014 Sochi	Team LH
- Updated on 14 February 2016

Thomas Diethart (born 25 February 1992) is an Austrian former ski jumper who won the 2014 Four Hills Tournament.

== Career ==
Diethart's debut in the FIS Ski Jumping World Cup took place in January 2011 in Innsbruck. He won his first podium, a third place, in Oberstdorf in 2013. His first world cup win took place just a few days later in Garmisch-Partenkirchen, when he won against his teammate Thomas Morgenstern and the Swiss Simon Ammann. After a 5th place in Innsbruck, he proceeded to win his second world cup jump in Bischofshofen, which also meant the triumph of the well-respected Four Hills Tournament.

Diethart competed for Austria at the 2014 Winter Olympics in Sochi, Russia in men's ski jumping in both the individual normal hill and large hill events. In the normal hill he qualified for the finals and placed fourth, while, in the large hill he did not qualify for the finals and placed 32nd. Then as part of the Austrian team along with Michael Hayböck, Thomas Morgenstern and Gregor Schlierenzauer he took a silver in the team large hill competition at the same games.

== World Cup ==
=== Standings ===
Season	Overall	4H	SF
2010/11	75	46	—
2013/14	8	1st place, gold medalist(s)	—
2014/15	43	16	44

=== Wins ===
No.	Season	Date	Location	Hill	Size
1	2013/14	1 January 2014	(Germany) Garmisch-Pa	Große Olympiaschanze HS137 (night)	LH
2	2013/14	6 January 2014	(Austria) Bischofshofen	Paul-Ausserleitner HS140 (night)	LH
