= Julia Clair =

French ski jumper

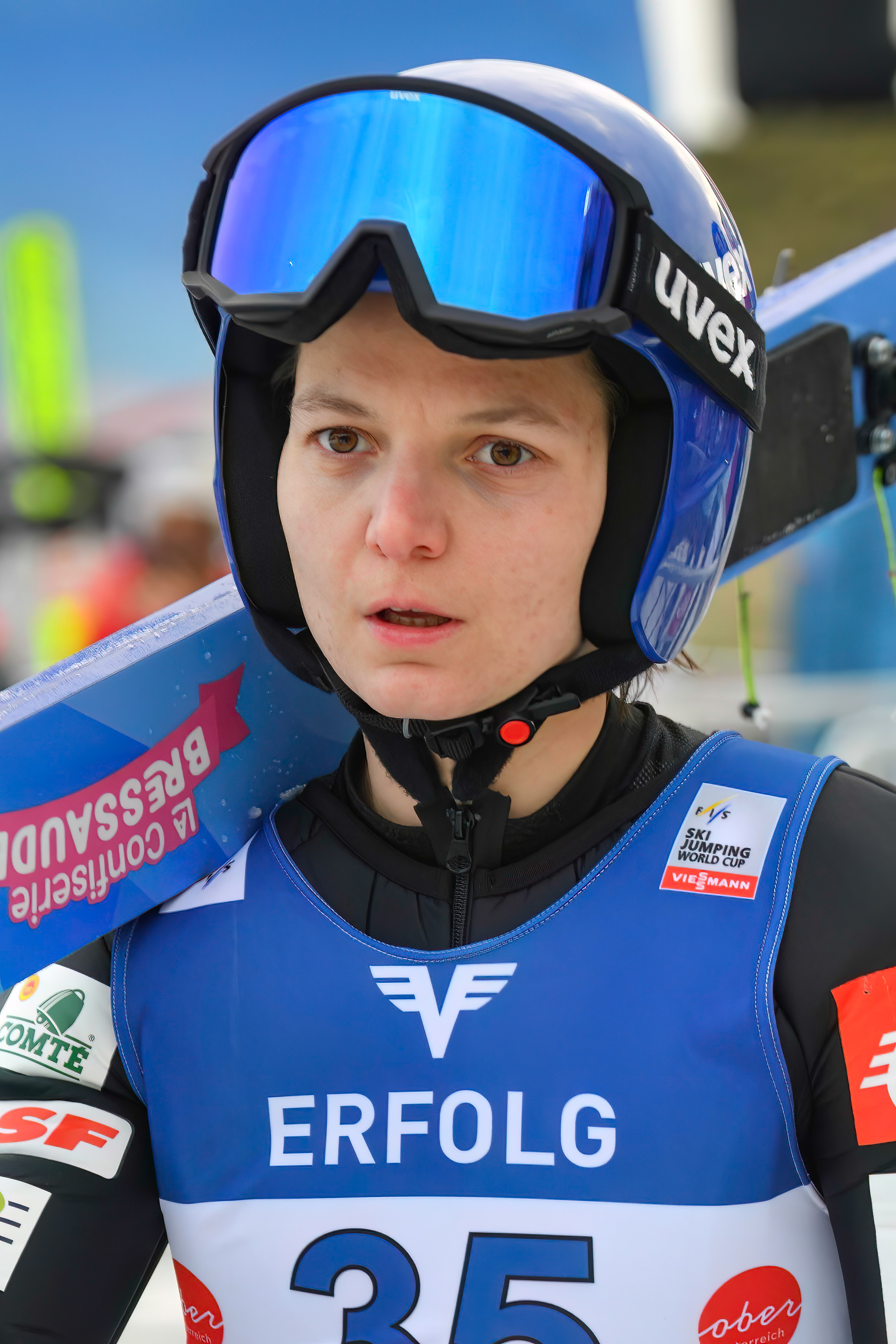
- Clair in 2023
- Born: 20 March 1994 (age 31); Saint-Dié-des-Vosges, Vosges, France
- Height: 163 cm (5 ft 4 in)

Julia Clair (born 20 March 1994) is a French former ski jumper. She was born in Saint-Dié-des-Vosges, and represents the club SC Xonrupt. Her junior career includes a silver medal at the 2013 Junior World Championships in Erzurum, and a bronze medal at the 2014 Junior World Championships in Val di Fiemme. She competed at the 2014 Winter Olympics in Sochi, in the ladies normal hill. In May 2024, she announced her retirement.
