= 2017–18 FIS Ski Jumping Continental Cup =

Ski-jumping competition series

Continental Cup 2017/18
Discipline	Men	Women
Beskidy Tour	(Poland) Klemens Murańka	—
Summer	(Poland) Klemens Murańka	(Poland) Kamila Karpiel
Winter	(Norway) Marius Lindvik	(Russia) Lidiia Iakovleva

Competition
Edition	16th (summer), 27th (winter)	10th (summer), 14th (winter)
Locations	8 (summer), 14 (winter)	2 (summer), 3 (winter)
Individual	13 (summer), 29 (winter)	4 (summer), 6 (winter)

The 2017/18 FIS Ski Jumping Continental Cup was the 27th in a row (25th official) Continental Cup winter season in ski jumping for men and the 14th for ladies. This was also the 16th summer continental cup season for men and 10th for ladies.

After twenty-eight years break, the total 29th edition of the "Beskidy Tour" returned to the ski jumping, first time as part of the Continental Cup. Competition was originally held between 1958 and 1989 as FIS Race event. A total of three competitions at three different hills in two countries took place from 18–20 August 2017. Competition was held in Szczyrk, Wisła and Frenštát pod Radhoštěm. Overall winner became Klemens Murańka from Poland.

Other competitive circuits this season included the World Cup, Grand Prix, FIS Cup, FIS Race and Alpen Cup.

== Map of continental cup hosts ==
All 23 locations hosting continental cup events in summer (8 for men / 2 for ladies) and in winter (14 for men / 3 for ladies) this season.

2017–18 FIS Ski Jumping Continental Cup (Europe)	2017–18 FIS Ski Jumping Continental Cup (Asia) 2017–18 FIS Ski Jumping Continental Cup (North America)

Men Ladies Men & Ladies

== Men's Summer ==
Individual men's events in the CC history

Total	F	L	N	Winners
184	—	101	83

after large hill event in Klingenthal (1 October 2017)

=== Calendar ===
All	No.	Date	Place (Hill)	Size	Winner	Second	Third	Overall leader	R.
172	1	7 July 2017	(Slovenia) Kranj (Bauhenk HS109)	N _{078}	(Poland) Klemens Murańka	(Slovenia) Miran Zupančič	(Slovenia) Bor Pavlovčič	(Poland) Klemens Murańka	
173	2	8 July 2017	(Slovenia) Kranj (Bauhenk HS109)	N _{079}	(Poland) Klemens Murańka	(Slovenia) Rok Justin	(United States) Kevin Bickner	(Poland) Klemens Murańka	
174	3	18 August 2017	(Poland) Szczyrk (Skalite HS106)	N _{080}	(Poland) A. Zniszczoł	(Poland) Klemens Murańka	(Slovenia) Miran Zupančič	(Poland) Klemens Murańka	
175	4	19 August 2017	(Poland) Wisła (Malinka HS134)	L _{095}	(Slovenia) Miran Zupančič	(Poland) Klemens Murańka	(Italy) Alex Insam	(Poland) Klemens Murańka	
176	5	20 August 2017	(Czech Republic) Frenštát (Areal Horečky HS106)	N _{081}	(Austria) Maximilian Steiner	(Switzerland) Andreas Schuler	(Poland) Klemens Murańka	(Poland) Klemens Murańka	
1st (29th) Beskidy Tour Continental Cup Overall (18 – 20 August 2017)					(Poland) Klemens Murańka	(Slovenia) Miran Zupančič	(Slovenia) Žiga Jelar	Beskidy Tour	
177	6	9 September 2017	(Austria) Stams (Brunnentalschanze HS115)	L _{096}	(Austria) Stefan Kraft	(Austria) Daniel Huber	(Slovenia) Tilen Bartol	(Poland) Klemens Murańka	
178	7	10 September 2017	(Austria) Stams (Brunnentalschanze HS115)	L _{097}	(Austria) Daniel Huber	(Austria) Stefan Kraft	(France) Vincent D. Sevoie	(Poland) Klemens Murańka	
179	8	16 September 2017	(Norway) Trondheim (Granåsen HS140)	L _{098}	(Germany) Pius Paschke	(Slovenia) Tilen Bartol	(Slovenia) Timi Zajc	(Poland) Klemens Murańka	
180	9	17 September 2017	(Norway) Trondheim (Granåsen HS140)	L _{099}	(Slovenia) Timi Zajc	(Slovenia) Tilen Bartol	(Germany) Constantin Schmid	(Poland) Klemens Murańka	
181	10	23 September 2017	(Romania) Râșnov (Trambulina Valea HS100)	N _{082}	(Germany) Pius Paschke	(Slovenia) Timi Zajc	(Norway) Joachim Hauer	(Poland) Klemens Murańka	
182	11	24 September 2017	(Romania) Râșnov (Trambulina Valea HS100)	N _{083}	(Germany) Pius Paschke	(Slovenia) Tilen Bartol	(Austria) Daniel Huber	(Poland) Klemens Murańka	
183	12	30 September 2017	(Germany) Klingenthal (Vogtland Arena HS140)	L _{100}	(Norway) Joachim Hauer	(Slovenia) Tilen Bartol	(Slovenia) Domen Prevc	(Poland) Klemens Murańka	
184	13	1 October 2017	(Germany) Klingenthal (Vogtland Arena HS140)	L _{101}	(Slovenia) Tilen Bartol	(Slovenia) Timi Zajc	(Norway) Joachim Hauer	(Poland) Klemens Murańka	
16th FIS Summer Continental Cup Men's Overall (7 July – 1 October 2017)					(Poland) Klemens Murańka	(Slovenia) Tilen Bartol	(Germany) Pius Paschke	Summer Overall	

==== Overall ====
Rank	after 13 events	Points
1	(Poland) Klemens Murańka	700
2	(Slovenia) Tilen Bartol	627
3	(Germany) Pius Paschke	562
4	(Slovenia) Timi Zajc	484
5	(Austria) Daniel Huber	389
6	(Norway) Joachim Hauer	361
7	(Slovenia) Miran Zupančič	322
8	(Poland) Aleksander Zniszczoł	267
9	(Germany) Constantin Schmid	207
10	(France) V. Descombes Sevoie	200

==== Beskidy Tour ====
Rank	after 3 events	Points
1	(Poland) Klemens Murańka	769.3
2	(Slovenia) Miran Zupančič	765.5
3	(Slovenia) Žiga Jelar	753.5
4	(Austria) Maximilian Steiner	753.4
5	(Poland) Aleksander Zniszczoł	752.0
6	(Germany) Pius Paschke	748.5
7	(Switzerland) Andreas Schuler	743.7
8	(Italy) Alex Insam	741.8
9	(Finland) Andreas Alamommo	724.3
10	(Poland) Bartłomiej Kłusek	724.1

== Men's Winter ==
Individual men's events in the CC history

Total	F	L	N	Winners
884	4	477	403

after normal hill event in Chaykovsky (19 March 2018)

=== Calendar ===
All	No.	Date	Place (Hill)	Size	Winner	Second	Third	Overall leader	R.
857	1	9 December 2017	(Canada) Whistler (Whistler Olympic Park HS104)	N _{401}	(Poland) Tomasz Pilch	(Austria) Philipp Aschenwald	(Norway) Marius Lindvik	(Poland) Tomasz Pilch	
858	2	10 December 2017	(Canada) Whistler (Whistler Olympic Park HS104)	N _{402}	(Germany) Andreas Wank	(France) Jonathan Learoyd	(Slovenia) Žiga Jelar	(Poland) Tomasz Pilch	
		16 December 2017	(Finland) Lahti (Salpausselkä HS130)	L _{cnx}	cancelled due to lack of snow (rescheduled to Ruka on same dates)			—	
		17 December 2017	(Finland) Lahti (Salpausselkä HS130)	L _{cnx}	cancelled due to lack of snow (rescheduled to Ruka on same dates)			—	
859	3	16 December 2017	(Finland) Ruka (Rukatunturi HS142)	L _{453}	(Poland) Tomasz Pilch	(Slovenia) Nejc Dežman	(Slovenia) Žiga Jelar	(Poland) Tomasz Pilch	
860	4	17 December 2017	(Finland) Ruka (Rukatunturi HS142)	L _{454}	(Slovenia) Jurij Tepeš	(Slovenia) Žiga Jelar	(Norway) Joachim Hauer	(Poland) Tomasz Pilch	
861	5	27 December 2017	(Switzerland) Engelberg (Gross-Titlis-Schanze HS140)	L _{455}	(France) Jonathan Learoyd	(Czech Republic) Viktor Polášek	(Switzerland) Killian Peier	(Poland) Tomasz Pilch	
862	6	28 December 2017	(Switzerland) Engelberg (Gross-Titlis-Schanze HS140)	L _{456}	(Austria) Ulrich Wohlgenannt	(Poland) Tomasz Pilch	(Norway) Marius Lindvik	(Poland) Tomasz Pilch	
863	7	6 January 2018	(Germany) Titisee-Neustadt (Hochfirstschanze HS142)	L _{457}	(Norway) Marius Lindvik	(Slovenia) Nejc Dežman	(France) Vincent Descombes Sevoie	(Poland) Tomasz Pilch	
864	8	7 January 2018	(Germany) Titisee-Neustadt (Hochfirstschanze HS142)	L _{458}	(Germany) David Siegel	(Norway) Marius Lindvik	(Norway) Sondre Ringen	(Norway) Marius Lindvik	
865	9	10 January 2018	(Austria) Bischofshofen (Paul-Ausserleitner HS140)	L _{459}	(Norway) Tom Hilde	(Germany) Andreas Wank	(Czech Republic) Čestmír Kožíšek	(Poland) Tomasz Pilch	
866	10	11 January 2018	(Austria) Bischofshofen (Paul-Ausserleitner HS140)	L _{460}	(Germany) David Siegel	(Germany) Andreas Wank	(Czech Republic) Nejc Dežman	(Poland) Tomasz Pilch	
		13 January 2018	(Austria) Bischofshofen (Paul-Ausserleitner HS140)	L _{cnx}	cancelled and rescheduled on 10 January			—	
		14 January 2018	(Austria) Bischofshofen (Paul-Ausserleitner HS140)	L _{cnx}	cancelled and rescheduled on 11 January			—	
		19 January 2018	(Turkey) Erzurum (Kiremitliktepe HS140)	L _{cnx}	cancelled and rescheduled on 20 January (first event of the day)			—	
867	11	20 January 2018	(Turkey) Erzurum (Kiremitliktepe HS140)	L _{461}	(Germany) David Siegel	(France) Jonathan Learoyd	(Norway) Marius Lindvik	(Poland) Tomasz Pilch	
868	12	20 January 2018	(Turkey) Erzurum (Kiremitliktepe HS140)	L _{462}	(Slovenia) Anže Lanišek	(Norway) Marius Lindvik	(Slovenia) Tomaž Naglič	(Norway) Marius Lindvik	
869	13	26 January 2018	(Japan) Sapporo (Miyanomori HS100) (Okurayama HS137)	N _{403}	(Slovenia) Robert Kranjec	(Norway) Sondre Ringen	(Austria) Daniel Huber	(Norway) Marius Lindvik	
870	14	27 January 2018	(Japan) Sapporo (Miyanomori HS100) (Okurayama HS137)	L _{463}	(Austria) Daniel Huber	(Russia) Evgeniy Klimov	(Norway) Tom Hilde	(Norway) Marius Lindvik	
871	15	28 January 2018	(Japan) Sapporo (Miyanomori HS100) (Okurayama HS137)	L _{464}	(Slovenia) Robert Kranjec	(Slovenia) Nejc Dežman	(Austria) Daniel Huber	(Slovenia) Nejc Dežman	
872	16	3 February 2018	(Slovenia) Planica (Bloudkova velikanka HS138)	L _{465}	(Slovenia) Anže Lanišek	(Austria) Philipp Aschenwald	(Germany) Pius Paschke	(Slovenia) Nejc Dežman	
873	17	4 February 2018	(Slovenia) Planica (Bloudkova velikanka HS138)	L _{466}	(Slovenia) Anže Lanišek	(Slovenia) Jurij Tepeš	(Austria) Philipp Aschenwald	(Germany) Andreas Wank	
874	18	10 February 2018	(United States) Iron Mountain (Pine Mountain HS133)	L _{467}	(Norway) Marius Lindvik	(Poland) Jakub Wolny	(Norway) Halvor Egner Granerud	(Norway) Marius Lindvik	
875	19	11 February 2018	(United States) Iron Mountain (Pine Mountain HS133)	L _{468}	(Norway) Halvor Egner Granerud	(Slovenia) Anže Lanišek	(Norway) Marius Lindvik	(Norway) Marius Lindvik	
876	20	18 February 2018	(Germany) Brotterode (Inselbergschanze HS117)	L _{469}	(Slovenia) Nejc Dežman	(Germany) David Siegel	(Germany) Andreas Wank	(Slovenia) Nejc Dežman	
877	21	18 February 2018	(Germany) Brotterode (Inselbergschanze HS117)	L _{470}	(Germany) David Siegel	(Poland) Jakub Wolny	(Slovenia) Anže Lanišek	(Slovenia) Nejc Dežman	
878	22	24 February 2018	(Germany) Klingenthal (Vogtland Arena HS140)	L _{471}	(Norway) Marius Lindvik	(Austria) Philipp Aschenwald	(Poland) Jakub Wolny	(Norway) Marius Lindvik	
879	23	25 February 2018	(Germany) Klingenthal (Vogtland Arena HS140)	L _{472}	(Norway) Marius Lindvik	(Poland) Jakub Wolny	(Slovenia) Anže Lanišek	(Norway) Marius Lindvik	
880	24	3 March 2018	(Norway) Rena (Renabakkene HS139)	L _{473}	(Germany) Andreas Wank	(Norway) Sondre Ringen	(Germany) David Siegel	(Norway) Marius Lindvik	
881	25	4 March 2018	(Norway) Rena (Renabakkene HS139)	L _{474}	(Austria) Manuel Poppinger	(Norway) Marius Lindvik (Germany) Andreas Wank		(Norway) Marius Lindvik	
882	26	10 March 2018	(Poland) Zakopane (Wielka Krokiew HS140)	L _{475}	(Austria) Manuel Fettner	(Slovenia) Bor Pavlovčič	(Austria) Ulrich Wohlgenannt	(Norway) Marius Lindvik	
883	27	11 March 2018	(Poland) Zakopane (Wielka Krokiew HS140)	L _{476}	(Austria) Manuel Fettner	(Slovenia) Bor Pavlovčič	(Austria) Daniel Huber	(Norway) Marius Lindvik	
884	28	17 March 2018	(Russia) Chaykovsky (Snezhinka HS140)	L _{477}	(Austria) Stefan Huber	(Germany) Constantin Schmid	(Slovenia) Cene Prevc	(Norway) Marius Lindvik	
		18 March 2018	(Russia) Chaykovsky (Snezhinka HS140)	L _{cnx}	cancelled due to strong wind			—	

==== Overall ====
Rank	after 29 events	Points
1	(Norway) Marius Lindvik	1102
2	(Germany) Andreas Wank	1040
3	(Germany) David Siegel	968
4	(Slovenia) Nejc Dežman	869
5	(Slovenia) Anže Lanišek	795
6	(Austria) Philipp Aschenwald	694
7	(Poland) Tomasz Pilch	575
8	(Slovenia) Tomaž Naglič	554
9	(Slovenia) Bor Pavlovčič	550
10	(Austria) Daniel Huber	528

== Women's Summer ==
Individual women's events in the CC history

Total	L	N	M	Winners
53	—	42	11

after normal hill event in Trondheim (16 September 2017)

=== Calendar ===
All	No.	Date	Place (Hill)	Size	Winner	Second	Third	Overall leader	R.
50	1	18 August 2017	(Germany) Oberwiesenthal (Fichtelbergschanzen HS106)	N _{039}	(Germany) Ramona Straub	(Poland) Kamila Karpiel	(Japan) Ren Mikase	(Germany) Ramona Straub	
51	2	19 August 2017	(Germany) Oberwiesenthal (Fichtelbergschanzen HS106)	N _{040}	(Poland) Kamila Karpiel	(Germany) Ramona Straub	(Russia) Anna Shpyneva	(Germany) Ramona Straub (Poland) Kamila Karpiel	
52	3	15 September 2017	(Norway) Trondheim (Granåsen HS105)	N _{041}	(Germany) Juliane Seyfarth	(Russia) Aleksandra Barantceva	(Poland) Kamila Karpiel	(Poland) Kamila Karpiel	
53	4	16 September 2017	(Norway) Trondheim (Granåsen HS105)	N _{042}	(Germany) Juliane Seyfarth	(Russia) Lidiia Iakovleva	(Norway) Thea Sofie Kleven	(Poland) Kamila Karpiel	

==== Overall ====
Rank	after 4 events	Points
1	(Poland) Kamila Karpiel	280
2	(Germany) Ramona Straub	262
3	(Germany) Juliane Seyfarth	200
4	(Russia) Lidiia Iakovleva	182
5	(Russia) Anna Shpyneva	154
6	(Russia) Aleksandra Barantceva	147
7	(Russia) Maria Iakovleva	131
8	(Norway) Thea Sofie Kleven	128
9	(Finland) Susanna Forsström	122
10	(Norway) Anniken Mork	95

== Women's Winter ==
Individual women's events in the CC history

Total	L	N	M	Winners
154	11	128	15

after normal hill event in Brotterode (18 February 2018)

=== Calendar ===
All	No.	Date	Place (Hill)	Size	Winner	Second	Third	Overall leader	R.
149	1	15 December 2017	(Norway) Notodden (Tveitanbakken HS100)	N _{125}	(Russia) Lidiia Iakovleva	(Russia) Mariia Iakovleva	(Russia) Anna Shpyneva	(Russia) Lidiia Iakovleva	
150	2	16 December 2017	(Norway) Notodden (Tveitanbakken HS100)	N _{126}	(Russia) A. Barantceva	(Russia) Lidiia Iakovleva	(Austria) Marita Kramer	(Russia) Lidiia Iakovleva	
151	3	20 January 2018	(Slovenia) Planica (Normal hill HS102)	N _{127}	(Austria) D. Iraschko-Stolz	(Russia) A. Barantceva	(Slovenia) Jerneja Brecl	(Russia) Lidiia Iakovleva (Russia) A. Barantceva	
152	4	21 January 2018	(Slovenia) Planica (Normal hill HS102)	N _{128}	(Austria) D. Iraschko-Stolz	(Russia) A. Barantceva	(Slovenia) Jerneja Brecl	(Russia) A. Barantceva	
153	5	16 February 2018	(Germany) Brotterode (Inselbergschanze HS117)	L _{010}	(Austria) D. Iraschko-Stolz	(Slovenia) Jerneja Brecl	(Russia) Lidiia Iakovleva	(Russia) A. Barantceva	
154	6	18 February 2018	(Germany) Brotterode (Inselbergschanze HS117)	L _{011}	(Austria) D. Iraschko-Stolz	(Russia) Lidiia Iakovleva	(France) Julia Clair	(Russia) Lidiia Iakovleva	

==== Overall ====
Rank	after 6 events	Points
1	(Russia) Lidiia Iakovleva	415
2	(Austria) Daniela Iraschko-Stolz	400
3	(Russia) Aleksandra Barantceva	382
4	(Russia) Anna Shpyneva	271
5	(Slovenia) Jerneja Brecl	236
6	(Russia) Maria Iakovleva	208
7	(Austria) Marita Kramer	151
8	(Kazakhstan) Valentina Sderzhikova	113
9	(France) Julia Clair	110
10	(Slovenia) Katra Komar	107

== Participants ==
Overall, total of 22 countries for both men and ladies participated in this season:

Asia (4)
Japan; Kazakhstan	South Korea; Turkey
Europe (14)
Austria; Czech Republic; Estonia; Finland; France; Germany; Hungary; Italy	Norway; Poland; Romania; Russia; Slovenia; Sweden; Switzerland; Ukraine
North America (2)
Canada	United States

== Europa Cup vs. Continental Cup ==
- Last two Europa Cup seasons (1991/92 and 1992/93) are recognized as first two Continental Cup seasons by International Ski Federation (FIS), although Continental Cup under this name officially started first season in 1993/94 season.

== See also ==
- 2017–18 FIS World Cup
- 2017 FIS Grand Prix
- 2017–18 FIS Cup
- 2017–18 FIS Race
- 2017–18 FIS Alpen Cup
