= 2017–18 FIS Cup (ski jumping) =

FIS Cup 2017/18
Discipline	Men	Women
Overall	(Austria) Elias Tollinger	(Slovenia) Nika Križnar

Competition
Edition	13th	6th
Locations	11	7
Individual	22	14
Cancelled	3	0

The 2017/18 FIS Cup (ski jumping) was the 13th FIS Cup season in ski jumping for men and the 6th for ladies.

Other competitive circuits this season included the World Cup, Grand Prix, Continental Cup, FIS Race and Alpen Cup.

== Calendar ==
=== Men ===
#	Date	Place	Hill	Size	Winner	Second	Third	Yellow bib	R.
1	1 July 2017	(Austria) Villach	Villacher Alpenarena HS98	NH	(Slovenia) Timi Zajc	(Italy) Federico Cecon	(Italy) Giovanni Bresadola	(Slovenia) Timi Zajc	
2	2 July 2017	(Austria) Villach	Villacher Alpenarena HS98	NH	(Germany) Lukas Wagner	(Austria) Elias Tollinger	(Austria) Ulrich Wohlgenannt	(Germany) Lukas Wagner	
3	12 August 2017	(Finland) Kuopio	Puijo HS127	LH	(Slovenia) Timi Zajc	(Finland) Eetu Nousiainen	(Germany) Pius Paschke	(Slovenia) Timi Zajc	
4	13 August 2017	(Finland) Kuopio	Puijo HS127	LH	(Slovenia) Timi Zajc	(Poland) Przemysław Kantyka	(Germany) Pius Paschke	(Slovenia) Timi Zajc	
5	16 September 2017	(Switzerland) Kandersteg	Lötschberg-Schanze HS106	NH	(Austria) Markus Rupitsch	(Japan) Masamitsu Itō	(Germany) Dominik Mayländer	(Slovenia) Timi Zajc	
6	17 September 2017	(Switzerland) Kandersteg	Lötschberg-Schanze HS106	NH	(Japan) Masamitsu Itō	(Switzerland) Andreas Schuler	(Germany) Dominik Mayländer	(Slovenia) Timi Zajc	
7	21 September 2017	(Romania) Râșnov	Trambulina Valea Cărbunării HS100	NH	(Austria) Markus Rupitsch	(Germany) Dominik Mayländer	(Austria) Philipp Aschenwald	(Slovenia) Timi Zajc	
8	22 September 2017	(Romania) Râșnov	Trambulina Valea Cărbunării HS100	NH	(Germany) Dominik Mayländer	(Slovenia) Aljaž Osterc	(Austria) Mika Schwann	(Slovenia) Timi Zajc	
9	7 December 2017	(Canada) Whistler	Whistler Olympic Park HS104	NH	(Austria) Elias Tollinger	(Slovenia) Nejc Dežman	(Austria) Florian Altenburger	(Austria) Elias Tollinger	
10	8 December 2017	(Canada) Whistler	Whistler Olympic Park HS106	NH	(Slovenia) Nejc Dežman	(Germany) Martin Hamann	(Germany) Andreas Wank	(Austria) Elias Tollinger	
11	15 December 2017	(Norway) Notodden	Tveitanbakken HS100	NH	(Norway) Sondre Ringen	(Austria) Ulrich Wohlgenannt	(Norway) Joakim Aune	(Austria) Elias Tollinger	
12	16 December 2017	(Norway) Notodden	Tveitanbakken HS100	NH	(Austria) Ulrich Wohlgenannt	(Poland) Przemysław Kantyka	(Germany) Paul Winter	(Poland) Przemysław Kantyka	
13	13 January 2018	(Poland) Zakopane	Wielka Krokiew HS140	LH	(Austria) Maximillian Steiner	(Austria) Stefan Huber	(Austria) Markus Rupitsch	(Poland) Przemysław Kantyka	
14	14 January 2018	(Poland) Zakopane	Wielka Krokiew HS140	LH	(Austria) Stefan Huber	(Austria) Maximillian Steiner	(Slovenia) Miran Zupančič	(Austria) Elias Tollinger	
15	20 January 2018	(Slovenia) Planica	Normal hill HS102	LH	(Austria) Markus Schiffner	(Slovenia) Žak Mogel	(Austria) Janni Reisenauer	(Austria) Elias Tollinger	
16	21 January 2018	(Slovenia) Planica	Normal hill HS102	LH	(Germany) Dominik Mayländer	(Austria) Thomas Hofer	(Austria) Maximilian Steiner	(Austria) Elias Tollinger	
17	10 February 2018	(Germany) Rastbüchl	Baptist Kitzlinger Schanze HS78	MH	(Poland) Tomasz Pilch	(Austria) Elias Tollinger	(Slovenia) Cene Prevc	(Austria) Elias Tollinger	
18	11 February 2018	(Germany) Rastbüchl	Baptist Kitzlinger Schanze HS78	MH	(Poland) Tomasz Pilch	(Austria) Markus Schiffner	(Austria) Markus Rupitsch	(Austria) Elias Tollinger	
19	24 February 2018	(Austria) Villach	Villacher Alpenarena HS98	NH	(Slovenia) Andraž Pograjc	(Austria) Markus Schiffner	(Austria) Jan Hörl	(Austria) Elias Tollinger	
20	25 February 2018	(Austria) Villach	Villacher Alpenarena HS98	NH	(Austria) Elias Tollinger	(Austria) Thomas Lackner	(Austria) Mika Schwann (Germany) Fabian Seidl	(Austria) Elias Tollinger	
	9 March 2018	(Japan) Sapporo	Miyanomori HS100	NH	rescheduled from FIS Cup to FIS Race				
	11 March 2018	(Japan) Sapporo	Ōkurayama HS137	LH	rescheduled from FIS Cup to FIS Race				
21	17 March 2018	(Sweden) Falun	Lugnet HS100	NH	(Germany) Julian Hahn	(Germany) Dominik Maylaender	(Germany) Philipp Raimund	(Austria) Elias Tollinger	
	18 March 2018	(Sweden) Falun	Lugnet HS100	NH	strong wind				

=== Ladies ===
#	Date	Place	Hill	Size	Winner	Second	Third	Yellow bib	R.
1	1 July 2017	(Austria) Villach	Villacher Alpenarena HS98	NH	(Slovenia) Nika Križnar	(Germany) Luisa Görlich	(Romania) Daniela Haralambie	(Slovenia) Nika Križnar	
2	2 July 2017	(Austria) Villach	Villacher Alpenarena HS98	NH	(Slovenia) Nika Križnar	(Germany) Juliane Seyfarth	(Romania) Daniela Haralambie	(Slovenia) Nika Križnar	
3	16 September 2017	(Switzerland) Kandersteg	Lötschberg-Schanze HS106	NH	(France) Léa Lemare	(Slovenia) Nika Križnar	(France) Julia Clair	(Slovenia) Nika Križnar	
4	17 September 2017	(Switzerland) Kandersteg	Lötschberg-Schanze HS106	NH	(Slovenia) Nika Križnar	(France) Léa Lemare	(Czech Republic) Barbora Blažková	(Slovenia) Nika Križnar	
5	21 September 2017	(Romania) Râșnov	Trambulina Valea Cărbunării HS100	NH	(Romania) Daniela Haralambie	(Poland) Kamila Karpiel	(Czech Republic) Stepanka Ptackova	(Slovenia) Nika Križnar	
6	22 September 2017	(Romania) Râșnov	Trambulina Valea Cărbunării HS100	NH	(Romania) Daniela Haralambie	(Poland) Kamila Karpiel	(Poland) Kinga Rajda	(Romania) Daniela Haralambie	
7	7 December 2017	(Canada) Whistler	Whistler Olympic Park HS104	NH	(Canada) Abigail Strate	(Canada) Natalie Eilers	(Canada) Atsuko Tanaka	(Romania) Daniela Haralambie	
8	8 December 2017	(Canada) Whistler	Whistler Olympic Park HS106	NH	(Canada) Abigail Strate	(Canada) Atsuko Tanaka	(South Korea) Guylim Park	(Romania) Daniela Haralambie	
9	10 February 2018	(Germany) Rastbüchl	Baptist Kitzlinger Schanze HS78	MH	(Germany) Agnes Reisch	(Germany) Jenny Nowak	(Austria) Marita Kramer	(Romania) Daniela Haralambie	
10	11 February 2018	(Germany) Rastbüchl	Baptist Kitzlinger Schanze HS78	MH	(Germany) Agnes Reisch	(Austria) Marita Kramer	(Germany) Pauline Heßler	(Romania) Daniela Haralambie	
11	24 February 2018	(Austria) Villach	Villacher Alpenarena HS98	NH	(Slovenia) Nika Križnar	(Slovenia) Ema Klinec	(Slovenia) Špela Rogelj	(Slovenia) Nika Križnar	
12	25 February 2018	(Austria) Villach	Villacher Alpenarena HS98	NH	(Slovenia) Nika Križnar	(Slovenia) Ema Klinec	(Germany) Luisa Görlich	(Slovenia) Nika Križnar	
13	17 March 2018	(Sweden) Falun	Lugnet HS100	NH	(Germany) Luisa Görlich	(Germany) Agnes Reisch	(Germany) Pauline Hessler	(Slovenia) Nika Križnar	
	18 March 2018	(Sweden) Falun	Lugnet HS100	NH	strong wind				

== Overall standings ==
=== Men ===
Rank	after all 21 events	Points
1	(Austria) Elias Tollinger	757
2	(Germany) Dominik Mayländer	594
3	(Austria) Markus Rupitsch	514
4	(Poland) Przemysław Kantyka	395
5	(Austria) Stefan Huber	386

=== Ladies ===
Rank	after all 13 events	Points
1	(Slovenia) Nika Križnar	580
2	(Germany) Luisa Görlich	388
3	(Romania) Daniela Haralambie	382
4	(Germany) Agnes Reisch	362
5	(Germany) Selina Freitag	256
