= 2017 FIS Ski Jumping Grand Prix =

International ski jumping competition

Grand Prix 2017
Discipline	Men	Women
Overall	(Poland) Dawid Kubacki	(Japan) Sara Takanashi
Nations Cup	Poland	Japan

Competition
Edition	24th	6th
Locations	7	3
Individual	9	5
Team	1	—

The 2017 FIS Ski Jumping Grand Prix was the 24th Summer Grand Prix season in ski jumping on plastic for men and the 6th for ladies.

Other competitive circuits this season included the World Cup, Continental Cup, FIS Cup, FIS Race and Alpen Cup.

== Map of grand prix hosts ==
All eight scheduled locations for men (8) and for ladies (2) in this season. Only Almaty was canceled before the season start.

2017 FIS Ski Jumping Grand Prix (Europe)	2017 FIS Ski Jumping Grand Prix (Asia)

== Calendar ==
=== Men ===
Num	Season	Date	Place	Hill	Size	Winner	Second	Third	Yellow bib	Ref.
178	1	15 July 2017	(Poland) Wisła	Malinka HS134 (night)	LH	(Poland) Dawid Kubacki	(Poland) Maciej Kot	(Germany) Karl Geiger	(Poland) Dawid Kubacki	
179	2	29 July 2017	(Germany) Hinterzarten	Rothaus-Schanze HS108 (night)	NH	(Poland) Dawid Kubacki	(Germany) Stephan Leyhe	(Poland) Piotr Żyła	(Poland) Dawid Kubacki	
180	3	12 August 2017	(France) Courchevel	Tremplin du Praz HS137	LH	(Poland) Dawid Kubacki	(Poland) Maciej Kot	(Czech Republic) Roman Koudelka (Russia) Denis Kornilov	(Poland) Dawid Kubacki	
181	4	26 August 2017	(Japan) Hakuba	Olympic Ski Jumps HS131 (night)	LH	(Japan) Junshirō Kobayashi	(Norway) Kenneth Gangnes	(Poland) Klemens Murańka	(Poland) Dawid Kubacki	
182	5	27 August 2017	(Japan) Hakuba	Olympic Ski Jumps HS131	LH	(Japan) Junshirō Kobayashi	(Japan) Ryōyū Kobayashi	(Slovenia) Anže Lanišek	(Poland) Dawid Kubacki	
183	6	9 September 2017	(Russia) Chaykovsky	Snezhinka HS140	LH	(Slovenia) Anže Lanišek	(Russia) Evgeniy Klimov	(Russia) Denis Kornilov	(Poland) Dawid Kubacki	
		10 September 2017	(Russia) Chaykovsky	Snezhinka HS140	LH	strong wind; moved to the normal hill HS102				
184	7	(Note: One round men's individual event because of wind in Chaykovsky on 10 September 2017. Moved from large (HS140) to normal (HS102) hill.)10 September 2017	(Russia) Chaykovsky	Snezhinka HS102	NH	(Slovenia) Anže Lanišek	(Japan) Junshirō Kobayashi	(Russia) Evgeniy Klimov	(Slovenia) Anže Lanišek	
185	8	1 October 2017	(Austria) Hinzenbach	Aigner-Schanze HS94	NH	(Poland) Dawid Kubacki	(Poland) Piotr Żyła	(Czech Republic) Roman Koudelka	(Poland) Dawid Kubacki	
186	9	3 October 2017	(Germany) Klingenthal	Vogtland Arena HS140	LH	(Poland) Dawid Kubacki	(Germany) Andreas Wellinger	(Norway) Johann André Forfang	(Poland) Dawid Kubacki	

=== Ladies ===
Num	Season	Date	Place	Hill	Size	Winner	Second	Third	Yellow bib	Ref.
21	1	11 August 2017	(France) Courchevel	Tremplin du Praz HS96	NH	(Germany) Katharina Althaus	(Japan) Sara Takanashi	(Japan) Yūki Itō	(Germany) Katharina Althaus	
22	2	18 August 2017	(Czech Republic) Frenštát pod Radhoštěm	Areal Horečky HS106	NH	(Japan) Yūki Itō	(France) Lucile Morat	(Norway) Maren Lundby	(Japan) Yūki Itō	
23	3	19 August 2017	(Czech Republic) Frenštát pod Radhoštěm	Areal Horečky HS106	NH	(Japan) Sara Takanashi	(Norway) Maren Lundby	(Japan) Yūki Itō	(Japan) Yūki Itō	
24	4	9 September 2017	(Russia) Chaykovsky	Snezhinka HS102	NH	(Japan) Sara Takanashi	(Finland) Julia Kykkänen	(Russia) Irina Avvakumova	(Japan) Sara Takanashi	
25	5	10 September 2017	(Russia) Chaykovsky	Snezhinka HS140	LH	(Japan) Sara Takanashi	(Russia) Irina Avvakumova	(Norway) Maren Lundby (Slovenia) Maja Vtič	(Japan) Sara Takanashi	

=== Men's team ===
Num	Season	Date	Place	Hill	Size	Winner	Second	Third	Yellow bib	Ref.
22	1	14 July 2017	(Poland) Wisła	Malinka HS134	LH	Poland Piotr Żyła; Kamil Stoch; Dawid Kubacki; Maciej Kot	Norway Anders Fannemel; Robert Johansson; Kenneth Gangnes; Daniel-André Tande	Germany Andreas Wank; Karl Geiger; Andreas Wellinger; Stephan Leyhe	Poland	

== Men's standings ==
=== Overall ===
Rank	after 9 events	Points
1	(Poland) Dawid Kubacki	500
2	(Slovenia) Anže Lanišek	353
3	(Japan) Junshirō Kobayashi	332
4	(Poland) Maciej Kot	270
5	(Russia) Evgeniy Klimov	232

=== Nations Cup ===
Rank	after 10 events	Points
1	Poland	1807
2	Norway	1230
3	Slovenia	1157
4	Germany	908
5	Japan	665

=== Prize money ===
Rank	after 10 events	CHF
1	(Poland) Dawid Kubacki	26,500
2	(Japan) Junshirō Kobayashi	13,000
3	(Slovenia) Anže Lanišek	12,500
4	(Poland) Maciej Kot	8,500
5	(Poland) Piotr Żyła	7,000

== Ladies' standings ==
=== Overall ===
Rank	after 5 events	Points
1	(Japan) Sara Takanashi	380
2	(Russia) Irina Avvakumova	290
3	(Norway) Maren Lundby	276
4	(France) Lucile Morat	256
5	(Japan) Yūki Itō	220

=== Nations Cup ===
Rank	after 5 events	Points
1	Japan	853
2	Slovenia	570
3	Russia	446
4	Germany	340
5	France	326

=== Prize money ===
Rank	after 5 events	CHF
1	(Japan) Sara Takanashi	9,000
2	(Japan) Yūki Itō	4,500
3	(Russia) Irina Avvakumova	4,000
4	(Norway) Maren Lundby	3,500
5	(Germany) Katharina Althaus	2,500
