= 2024–25 FIS Ski Jumping Alpen Cup =

International ski jumping competitions

Discipline	Men	Women
Overall	(Austria) Nikolaus Humml	(Czech Republic) Anežka Indráčková
- Nations Cup: Germany

Competition
Edition	35th	17th
Locations	6	6
Individual	12	12
Cancelled	1	1

The 2024–25 FIS Ski Jumping Alpen Cup, organized by the International Ski Federation (FIS), is the 35th FIS Ski Jumping Alpen Cup for men, and 17th season for women as the fourth level of international ski jumping competitions for men, and third level for women.

The season started on 9 September 2024 in Pöhla, Germany for women and on 14 September 2024 in Hinterzarten, Germany for men and it will conclude on 8 March 2024 in Oberhof, Germany.

Jannik Faißt from Germany and Tina Erzar from Slovenia are the defending champions from the previous season in respectively men and woman classification.

== Map of Alpen Cup hosts ==
Europe
Location of all 7 Alpen Cup hosts of the season

== Men ==
=== Calendar ===
No.	Date	Place (Hill)	Size	Winner	Second	Third	R.
1	14 September 2024	(Germany) Hinterzarten (Adler Ski Stadium HS109)	N	(Austria) Simon Steinberger	(Austria) Clemens Vinatzer	(Austria) Lukas Haagen	
2	15 September 2024	(Germany) Hinterzarten (Adler Ski Stadium HS109)	N	(Slovenia) Žiga Jančar	(Austria) Nikolaus Humml	(Slovenia) Urban Šimnic	
3	27 September 2024	(Czech Republic) Liberec (Ještěd B HS100)	N	(Austria) Johannes Pölz	(Austria) Nikolaus Humml	(Slovenia) Žiga Jančar	
4	28 September 2024	(Czech Republic) Liberec (Ještěd B HS100)	N	(Czech Republic) David Rygl	(Austria) Simon Steinberger	(Germany) Simon Steinbeißer	
	20 December 2024	(Austria) Seefeld in Tirol (Toni-Seelos-Olympiaschanze HS109)	N	cancelled due to soft snow on the hill			
5	21 December 2024	(Austria) Seefeld in Tirol (Toni-Seelos-Olympiaschanze HS109)	N	(Austria) Lukas Haagen	(Austria) Johannes Pölz	(Austria) Matthias Wieser	
6	10 January 2025	(France) Chaux-Neuve (La Côte Feuillée HS118)	L	(Austria) Lukas Haagen (Austria) Nikolaus Humml		(Germany) Max Unglaube	
7	11 January 2025	(France) Chaux-Neuve (La Côte Feuillée HS118)	L	(Austria) Jakob Steinberger	(Austria) Johannes Pölz	(Austria) Nikolaus Humml	
8	25 January 2025	(Poland) Szczyrk (Skalite HS104)	N	(Slovenia) Žiga Jančar	(Austria) Simon Steinberger	(Slovenia) Urban Šimnic	
9	26 January 2024	(Poland) Szczyrk (Skalite HS104)	N	(Austria) Simon Steinberger	(Poland) Wiktor Szozda	(Austria) Lukas Haagen	
10	7 March 2024	(Germany) Oberhof (Kanzlersgrund HS100)	N				
11	8 March 2024	(Germany) Oberhof (Kanzlersgrund HS100)	N				
35th Alpen Cup Overall (14 September 2024 – 8 March 2025)							

==== Overall leaders ====
No.	Holder	Date gained	Place	Date forfeited	Place	Number of competitions
1.	(Austria) Simon Steinberger	14 September 2024	(Germany) Hinterzarten	15 September 2024	(Germany) Hinterzarten	1
2.	(Slovenia) Žiga Jančar	15 September 2024	(Germany) Hinterzarten	28 September 2024	(Czech Republic) Liberec	2
3.	(Austria) Nikolaus Humml	28 September 2024	(Czech Republic) Liberec			6

== Women ==
=== Calendar ===
No.	Date	Place (Hill)	Size	Winner	Second	Third	R.
1	9 September 2024	(Germany) Pöhla (Pöhlbachschanze HS66)	M	(Germany) Lara Sophie Legenmajer	(Germany) Lisa Feicht	(Germany) Sina Kiechle	
2	10 September 2024	(Germany) Pöhla (Pöhlbachschanze HS66)	M	(Germany) Lara Sophie Legenmajer	(Poland) Natalia Słowik	(Germany) Lia Böhme	
3	14 September 2024	(Germany) Hinterzarten (Adler Ski Stadium HS109)	N	(Slovenia) Jerica Jesenko	(Germany) Anna-Fay Scharfenberg	(Germany) Julina Kreibich	
4	15 September 2024	(Germany) Hinterzarten (Adler Ski Stadium HS109)	N	(Germany) Julina Kreibich	(Slovenia) Jerica Jesenko	(Germany) Anna-Fay Scharfenberg	
5	27 September 2024	(Czech Republic) Liberec (Ještěd B HS100)	N	(Czech Republic) Anežka Indráčková	(Italy) Martina Zanitzer	(Slovenia) Urša Vidmar	
6	28 September 2024	(Czech Republic) Liberec (Ještěd B HS100)	N	(Czech Republic) Anežka Indráčková	(Italy) Martina Zanitzer	(Slovenia) Taja Kosir	
	20 December 2024	(Austria) Seefeld in Tirol (Toni-Seelos-Olympiaschanze HS109)	N	cancelled due to soft snow on the hill			
7	21 December 2024	(Austria) Seefeld in Tirol (Toni-Seelos-Olympiaschanze HS109)	N	(Slovenia) Tina Erzar	(Czech Republic) Anežka Indráčková	(Slovenia) Lucija Jurgec	
8	10 January 2025	(France) Chaux-Neuve (La Côte Feuillée HS118)	L	(Slovenia) Tina Erzar	(Czech Republic) Anežka Indráčková	(Germany) Julina Kreibich	
9	11 January 2025	(France) Chaux-Neuve (La Côte Feuillée HS118)	L	(Czech Republic) Anežka Indráčková	(Slovenia) Tina Erzar	(Germany) Lia Böhme	
10	25 January 2025	(Poland) Szczyrk (Skalite HS104)	N	(Slovenia) Tina Erzar	(Germany) Kim Amy Duschek	(Slovenia) Tinkara Komar	
11	26 January 2024	(Poland) Szczyrk (Skalite HS104)	N	(Slovenia) Tina Erzar	(Germany) Kim Amy Duschek	(Slovenia) Lucija Jurgec	
12	7 March 2024	(Germany) Oberhof (Kanzlersgrund HS100)	N				
13	8 March 2024	(Germany) Oberhof (Kanzlersgrund HS100)	N				
17th Alpen Cup Overall (9 September 2024 – 8 March 2025)							

==== Overall leaders ====
No.	Holder	Date gained	Place	Date forfeited	Place	Number of competitions
1.	(Germany) Lara Sophie Legenmajer	9 September 2024	(Germany) Pöhla	21 December 2024	(Austria) Seefeld in Tirol	6
2.	(Czech Republic) Anežka Indráčková	21 December 2024	(Austria) Seefeld in Tirol			4

== Standings ==
=== Men ===
Rank	after 9 of 11 events	Points
	(Austria) Nikolaus Humml	489
2	(Austria) Johannes Pölz	451
3	(Slovenia) Žiga Jančar	448
4	(Austria) Lukas Haagen	419
5	(Austria) Simon Steinberger	376
6	(Slovenia) Urban Šimnic	303
7	(Austria) Jakob Steinberger	271
8	(Austria) Clemens Vinatzer	265
9	(Germany) Robin Kloss	221
10	(Austria) Matthias Wieser	199

=== Women ===
Rank	after 11 of 13 events	Points
	(Czech Republic) Anežka Indráčková	516
2	(Slovenia) Tina Erzar	480
3	(Germany) Kim Amy Duschek	380
4	(Germany) Anna-Fay Scharfenberg	356
5	(Germany) Julina Kreibich	328
6	(Germany) Lia Böhme	327
7	(Slovenia) Jerica Jesenko	303
8	(Slovenia) Lucija Jurgec	297
9	(Slovenia) Tinkara Komar	281
10	(Italy) Martina Zanitzer	273

=== Nations Cup ===
Rank	after 20 of 24 events	Points
	Slovenia	3499
2	Germany	3390
3	Austria	3373
4	Czech Republic	842
5	Poland	764
6	Italy	604
7	France	281
8	Switzerland	159
9	Latvia	4

== Podium table by nation ==
Table showing the Alpen Cup podium places (gold–1st place, silver–2nd place, bronze–3rd place) by the countries represented by the athletes.

Rank	Nation	Gold	Silver	Bronze	Total
1	Austria	7	7	4	18
2	Slovenia	7	2	8	17
3	Czech Republic	4	2	0	6
4	Germany	3	4	8	15
5	Italy	0	2	0	2
5	Poland	0	2	0	2
Totals (6 entries)		21	19	20	60
