= FIS Cup (ski jumping) =

Series of international ski jumping events

- Genre: ski jumping
- Locations: Europe; Japan; United States; Turkey (rarely); Canada (rarely); South Korea (rarely)
- Inaugurated: 2005/06 (men); 2012/13 (women)
- Organiser: International Ski Federation

The FIS Cup (ski jumping) is a series of ski jumping competitions arranged yearly by the International Ski Federation. It is considered the third level of international ski jumping, ranking below the World Cup and the Continental Cup. Most of the events are held on normal hills, with a construction point of 90 meters. Jumpers rarely compete the entire season in the FIS Cup. If a jumper performs well in the FIS Cup, he is often moved up to the Continental Cup. Men's circuit was introduced in 2005/06 and women started their first season in 2012/13

Higher competitive circuits are the World Cup, the Summer Grand Prix and the Continental Cup; the lower circuits include the FIS Race and the Alpen Cup.

== Standings ==
=== Men ===
Season	Winner	Second	Third
2005/06	(Austria) Mario Innauer	(Poland) Wojciech Skupień	(Austria) Gregor Schlierenzauer
2006/07	(Austria) Nicolas Fettner	(Austria) Stefan Innerwinkler	(Russia) Pavel Karelin
2007/08	(Austria) Markus Eggenhofer	(Austria) Nicolas Fettner	(Poland) Łukasz Rutkowski
2008/09	(Germany) Felix Brodauf	(Germany) David Winkler	(Germany) Marc Krauspenhaar
2009/10	(Germany) Felix Brodauf	(Germany) Nico Hermann	(Germany) Jörg Ritzerfeld
2010/11	(Slovakia) Tomáš Zmoray	(Austria) Lukas Müller	(Russia) Ilmir Hazetdinov
2011/12	(Slovenia) Cene Prevc	(Slovenia) Rok Justin	(Germany) Michael Dreher
2012/13	(Austria) David Unterberger	(Germany) Markus Eisenbichler	(Austria) Markus Schiffner
2013/14	(Switzerland) Marco Grigoli	(Switzerland) Pascal Egloff	(Slovakia) Tomáš Zmoray
2014/15	(Poland) Andrzej Stękała	(Slovenia) Žiga Mandl	(Poland) Przemysław Kantyka
2015/16	(Germany) Danny Queck	(Germany) Michael Dreher	(Austria) Simon Greiderer
2016/17	(Poland) Paweł Wąsek	(Japan) Juken Iwasa	(Slovenia) Aljaž Osterc
2017/18	(Austria) Elias Tollinger	(Germany) Dominik Mayländer	(Austria) Markus Rupitsch
2018/19	(Germany) Fabian Seidl	(Switzerland) Luca Egloff	(Germany) Johannes Schubert
2019/20	(Germany) Tim Fuchs	(Austria) Stefan Rainer	(Austria) Maximilian Steiner
2020/21	(Austria) Maximilian Ortner	(Austria) Stefan Huber	(Austria) Francisco Mörth
2021/22	(Austria) Francisco Mörth	(Austria) Mika Schwann	(Austria) Janni Reisenauer
2022/23	(Austria) Maximilian Lienher	(Austria) Janni Reisenauer	(Austria) Niklas Bachlinger
2023/24	(Austria) Stefan Rainer	(Austria) Francisco Mörth	(Austria) Timon-Pascal Kahofer

=== Women ===
Season	Winner	Second	Third
2012/13	(Russia) Sofia Tikhonova	(Romania) Daniela Haralambie	(Slovenia) Ema Klinec
2013/14	(Slovenia) Urša Bogataj	(Russia) Sofia Tikhonova	(Czech Republic) Michaela Doleželová (Slovenia) Ema Klinec
2014/15	(Germany) Gianina Ernst	(Romania) Daniela Haralambie	(Germany) Svenja Würth
2015/16	(Poland) Kinga Rajda	(Romania) Daniela Haralambie	(Slovenia) Urša Bogataj
2016/17	(Romania) Daniela Haralambie	(Poland) Kinga Rajda	(Romania) Andreea Diana Trâmbițaș
2017/18	(Slovenia) Nika Križnar	(Germany) Luisa Görlich	(Romania) Daniela Haralambie
2018/19	(Romania) Daniela Haralambie	(Austria) Elisabeth Raudaschl	(Canada) Abigail Strait
2019/20	(Czech Republic) Klára Ulrichová	(Czech Republic) Štěpánka Ptáčková	(Czech Republic) Karolína Indráčková
2020/21	(Slovenia) Jerneja Repinc Zupančič	(Austria) Katharina Ellmauer	(Slovenia) Nika Vetrih
2021/22	(Switzerland) Sina Arnet	(Austria) Julia Mühlbacher	(Italy) Lara Malsiner
2022/23	(Germany) Juliane Seyfarth	(Slovenia) Taja Bodlaj	(Poland) Nicole Konderla
