= 2017–18 FIS Ski Jumping Alpen Cup =

Alpen Cup 2017/18
Discipline	Men	Women
Overall	(Switzerland) Sandro Hauswirth	(Germany) Jenny Nowak
Alpen Cup Tournament	—	(Austria) Lisa Eder

Competition
Edition	28th	10th
Locations	6	8
Individual	12	14
Cancelled	1	2

The 2017/18 FIS Ski Jumping Alpen Cup was the 28th Alpen Cup season in ski jumping for men and the 10th for ladies.

Other competitive circuits this season included the World Cup, Grand Prix, Continental Cup, FIS Cup and FIS Race.

== Calendar ==
=== Men ===
Season	Date	Place	Hill	Size	Winner	Second	Third	Ref.
1	9 September 2017	(Switzerland) Kandersteg	Lötschberg-Schanze HS106	NH	(Slovenia) Aljaž Osterc	(Austria) Philipp Haagen	(Germany) Cedrik Weigel	
2	10 September 2017	(Switzerland) Kandersteg	Lötschberg-Schanze HS106	NH	(Switzerland) Sandro Hauswirth	(Slovenia) Jan Kus	(Austria) Philipp Haagen	
3	23 September 2017	(Italy) Predazzo - Passo Rolle	Trampolino dal Ben HS106	NH	(Germany) Justin Lisso	(France) Jonathan Learoyd	(Slovenia) Jan Kus	
4	24 September 2017	(Italy) Predazzo - Passo Rolle	Trampolino dal Ben HS106	NH	(Germany) Justin Lisso	(Germany) Luca Roth	(Slovenia) Jan Kus	
5	14 December 2017	(Austria) Seefeld	Toni-Seelos-Olympiaschanze HS109	NH	(Austria) Clemens Leitner	(Austria) Julian Wienerroither	(Germany) Cedrik Weigel	
6	15 December 2017	(Austria) Seefeld	Toni-Seelos-Olympiaschanze HS109	NH	(Switzerland) Sandro Hauswirth	(Slovenia) Aljaž Osterc	(Austria) Clemens Leitner	
7	13 January 2018	(Germany) Hinterzarten	Rothaus-Schanze HS108	NH	(Austria) Jan Hoerl	(Germany) Luca Roth	(Switzerland) Sandro Hauswirth	
8	14 January 2018	(Germany) Hinterzarten	Rothaus-Schanze HS108	NH	(Austria) Jan Hoerl	(Slovenia) Aljaž Osterc (Germany) Philipp Raimund		
9	17 February 2018	(Slovenia) Kranj	Bauhenk HS109	NH	(Slovenia) Domen Prevc	(Slovenia) Žak Mogel	(Austria) Maximilian Lienher	
10	18 February 2018	(Slovenia) Kranj	Bauhenk HS109	NH	(Austria) Jan Hörl	(Switzerland) Sandro Hauswirth	(Austria) Maximilian Lienher	
11	9 March 2018	(France) Chaux-Neuve	La Côté Feuillée HS118	LH	(Switzerland) Sandro Hauswirth	(Slovenia) Jan Kus	(Austria) Mika Schwann	
12	10 March 2018	(France) Chaux-Neuve	La Côté Feuillée HS118	LH	(Slovenia) Žak Mogel	(Austria) Mika Schwann	(Slovenia) Aljaž Osterc	

=== Ladies ===
Season	Date	Place	Hill	Size	Winner	Second	Third	Ref.
1	6 August 2017	(Germany) Klingenthal	Mühlleithen Vogtlandschanzen HS85	MH	(Austria) Julia Mühlbacher	(Germany) Josephin Laue	(Austria) Lisa Eder	
2	7 August 2017	(Germany) Klingenthal	Mühlleithen Vogtlandschanzen HS85	MH	(Germany) Alexandra Seifert	(Germany) Jenny Nowak	(Austria) Lisa Hirner	
3	9 August 2017	(Germany) Pöhla	Pöhlbachschanze HS66	MH	(Austria) Lisa Eder	(Germany) Jenny Nowak	(Germany) Alexandra Seifert	
4	10 August 2017	(Germany) Pöhla	Pöhlbachschanze HS66	MH	(Austria) Lisa Eder	(Germany) Jenny Nowak	(Austria) Lisa Hirner	
5	11 August 2017	(Germany) Bischofsgrün	Ochsenkopfschanze HS71	MH	(Slovenia) Katra Komar	(Austria) Lisa Hirner	(Germany) Jenny Nowak	
6	12 August 2017	(Germany) Bischofsgrün	Ochsenkopfschanze HS71	MH	(Austria) Lisa Eder	(Slovenia) Katra Komar	(Slovenia) Kaja Urbanija Čož	
2nd Alpen Cup Tournament Overall (6–12 August 2017)					(Austria) Lisa Eder	(Germany) Jenny Nowak	(Germany) Alexandra Seifert	
7	23 September 2017	(Italy) Predazzo - Passo Rolle	Trampolino dal Ben HS104	NH	(France) Océane Paillard	(Italy) Lara Malsiner	(France) Joséphine Pagnier	
8	24 September 2017	(Italy) Predazzo - Passo Rolle	Trampolino dal Ben HS104	NH	(France) Océane Paillard	(Italy) Lara Malsiner	(Germany) Selina Freitag	
9	16 December 2017	(Austria) Seefeld	Toni-Seelos-Olympiaschanze HS75	MH	(Germany) Jenny Nowak	(Slovenia) Jerneja Brecl	(Austria) Lisa Hirner	
	17 December 2017	(Austria) Seefeld	Toni-Seelos-Olympiaschanze HS75	MH	canceled			
10	13 January 2018	(Germany) Hinterzarten	Rothaus-Schanze HS108	NH	(Slovenia) Jerneja Brecl	(Poland) Kinga Rajda	(Slovenia) Katra Komar	
11	14 January 2018	(Germany) Hinterzarten	Rothaus-Schanze HS108	NH	(Slovenia) Jerneja Brecl	(Slovenia) Katra Komar	(Germany) Jenny Nowak	
	17 February 2018	(Germany) Baiersbronn	Ruhesteinschanze HS90	NH	canceled			
12	18 February 2018	(Germany) Baiersbronn	Ruhesteinschanze HS90	NH	(Austria) Lisa Eder	(Slovenia) Jerneja Repinc Zupančič	(Germany) Jenny Nowak	
13	10 March 2018	(France) Chaux-Neuve	La Côté Feuillée HS60	LH	(Austria) Lisa Eder	(France) Océane Paillard	(France) Romane Dieu	
14	11 March 2018	(France) Chaux-Neuve	La Côté Feuillée HS60	LH	(Austria) Lisa Eder	(France) Océane Paillard	(Italy) Marina Ambrosi	

=== Men's team ===
Season	Date	Place	Hill	Size	Winner	Second	Third	Ref.
	13 January 2018	(Germany) Hinterzarten	Rothaus-Schanze HS108	NH	canceled			

== Standings ==
=== Men ===
Rank	after 12 events	Points
1	(Switzerland) Sandro Hauswirth	687
2	(Slovenia) Jan Kus	561
3	(Slovenia) Aljaž Osterc	557
4	(Germany) Luca Roth	503
5	(Slovenia) Žak Mogel	447

=== Ladies ===
Rank	after 14 events	Points
1	(Germany) Jenny Nowak	744
2	(Austria) Lisa Eder	691
3	(Germany) Alexandra Seifert	542
4	(France) Océane Paillard	455
5	(Slovenia) Katra Komar	442

=== Ladies' Alpen Cup Tournament ===
Rank	after 6 events	Points
1	(Austria) Lisa Eder	1280.4
2	(Germany) Jenny Nowak	1273.4
3	(Germany) Alexandra Seifert	1252.3
4	(Austria) Julia Mühlbacher	1232.2
5	(Austria) Lisa Hirner	1219.3
