= Lidiia Iakovleva =

Lidiia Iakovleva may refer to:

- Lidiia Iakovleva (ski jumper)
- Lidiia Iakovleva (gymnast)
