= 2017–18 FIS Race (ski jumping) =

FIS Race 2017/18
Discipline	Men	Women

Competition
Locations	3	4
Individual	4	6

The 2017/18 FIS Race (ski jumping) was the 19th FIS Race regular season as the fourth level of ski jumping competition since 1999/00. Although even before the world cup and in the old days FIS Race events were all top level organized competitions.

Other competitive circuits this season included the World Cup, Grand Prix, Continental Cup, FIS Cup and Alpen Cup.

== Calendar ==
=== Men ===
Season	Date	Place	Hill	Size	Winner	Second	Third	Ref.
1	12 August 2017	(Slovenia) Planica	Planica Youth Hills HS80	MH	(Kazakhstan) Sergey Tkachenko	(Kazakhstan) Ilya Kratov	(Romania) Daniel Cacina	
2	13 August 2017	(Slovenia) Planica	Planica Youth Hills HS80	MH	(Kazakhstan) Sergey Tkachenko	(Kazakhstan) Ilya Kratov	(Romania) Sorin Mitrofan	
3	20 September 2017	(Romania) Râșnov	Trambulina Valea Cărbunării HS71	MH	(Czech Republic) Radek Selcer	(Czech Republic) Jakub Sikola	(Russia) Ilya Baskakov	
4	20 February 2018	(United States) Lake Placid	MacKenzie Intervale HS100	NH				
5	9 March 2018	(Japan) Sapporo	Miyanomori HS100	NH	(Japan) Tomofumi Naito	(Japan) Hiroaki Watanabe	(Japan) Yūmu Harada	
6	11 March 2018	(Japan) Sapporo	Ōkurayama HS134	LH	(Japan) Daiki Itō	(Japan) Shōhei Tochimoto	(Japan) Tomofumi Naito	

=== Ladies ===
Season	Date	Place	Hill	Size	Winner	Second	Third	Ref.
1	12 August 2017	(Slovenia) Planica	Planica Youth Hills HS80	MH	(Poland) Kamila Karpiel	(Romania) Diana Trambitas	(Hungary) Virág Vörös	
2	13 August 2017	(Slovenia) Planica	Planica Youth Hills HS80	MH	(Poland) Kamila Karpiel	(Romania) Diana Trambitas	(Kazakhstan) Valentina Sderzhikova	
3	20 September 2017	(Romania) Râșnov	Trambulina Valea Cărbunării HS71	MH	(Poland) Kamila Karpiel	(Poland) Anna Twardosz	(Poland) Paulina Cieślar	
4	20 February 2018	(United States) Lake Placid	MacKenzie Intervale HS100	NH				
5	9 March 2018	(Japan) Sapporo	Miyanomori HS100	NH	(Japan) Nozomi Maruyama	(Japan) Misaki Shigeno	(Japan) Ayuka Takeda	
6	11 March 2018	(Japan) Sapporo	Ōkurayama HS137	LH	(Japan) Misaki Shigeno	(Japan) Yūka Kobayashi	(Japan) Shihori Ōi	
