= Snezhinka (ski jumping venue) =

Ski jumping hill in Chaykovsky, Russia

Coordinates: 56.738310°N 54.043231°E

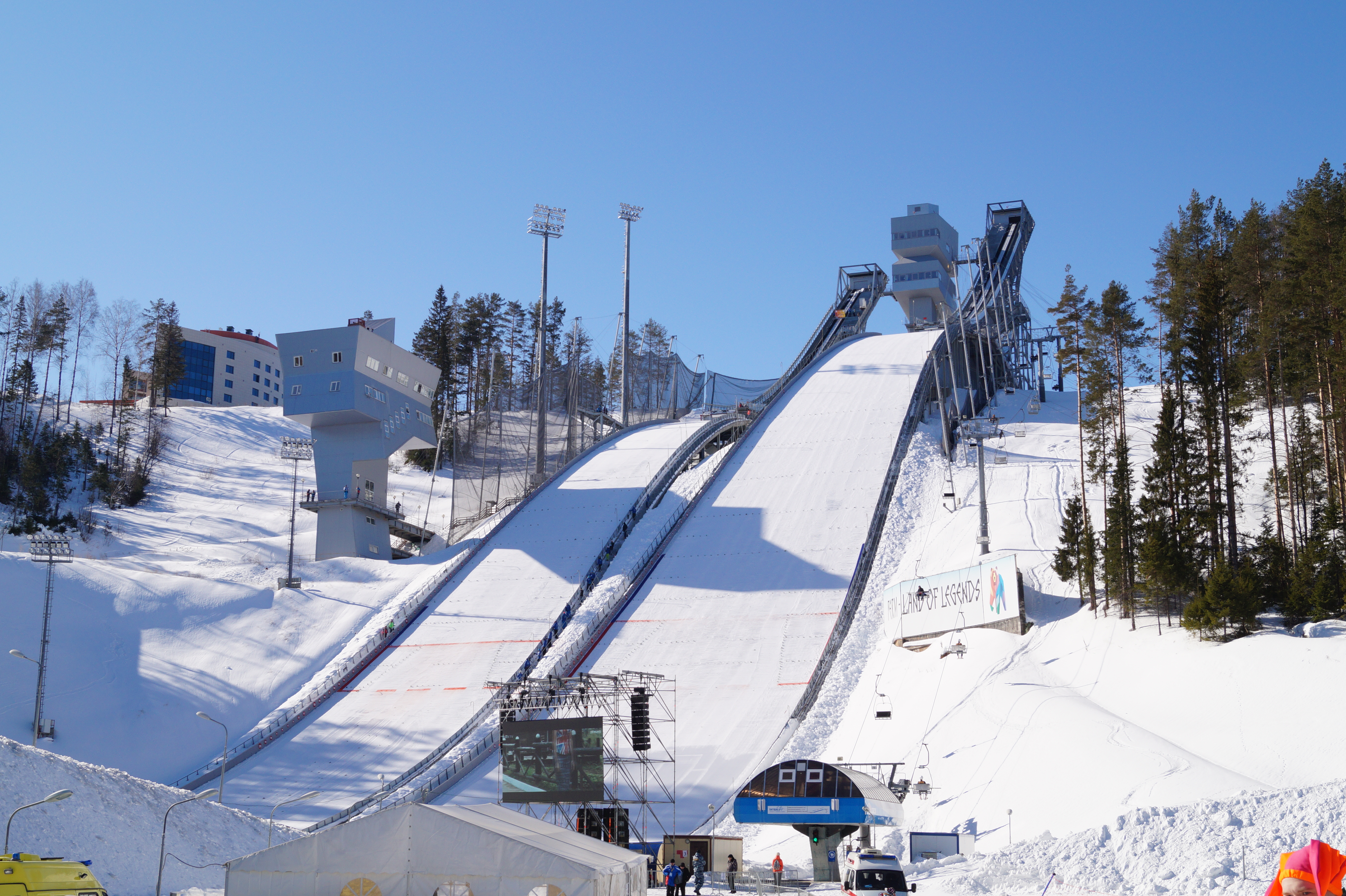
- Location: Chaykovsky, Russia
- Opened: 15 September 2012

Size
- K–point: 95, 125 m
- Hill size: 102, 140 m
- Hill record: 147.0 m (482 ft) (Russia) Evgeniy Klimov (10 January 2017); 109.5 m (359 ft) (Slovenia) Anže Lanišek (10 September 2017)

Snezhinka (Russian: Снежинка) is a ski jumping venue in Chaykovsky, Russia.

== History ==
First K40 hill was opened in 1980. K125 and K95 hills were opened in 2012. It hosted four FIS Ski jumping World Cup events for women in 2014, as well as several Summer Grand Prix events for women and men. There are also smaller K20, K40 and K65 hills.

== Events ==
=== Men ===
Date	Hillsize	Competition	Winner	Second	Third
5 September 2015	HS140	SGP	strong wind, moved to normal hill		
5 September 2015	HS106	SGP	(Norway) Kenneth Gangnes	(Slovenia) Robert Kranjec	(Norway) Joachim Hauer
6 September 2015	HS140	SGP	(Norway) Kenneth Gangnes	(Poland) Jan Ziobro	(Norway) Joachim Hauer
10 September 2016	HS140	SGP	(Slovenia) Robert Kranjec	(Slovenia) Anže Semenič	(Germany) Karl Geiger
11 September 2016	HS140	SGP	(Slovenia) Anže Semenič	(Czech Republic) Tomáš Vančura	(Czech Republic) Vojtěch Štursa
9 September 2017	HS140	SGP	(Slovenia) Anže Lanišek	(Russia) Evgeniy Klimov	(Russia) Denis Kornilov
10 September 2017	HS102	SGP	(Slovenia) Anže Lanišek	(Japan) Junshirō Kobayashi	(Russia) Evgeniy Klimov

=== Ladies ===
Date	Hillsize	Competition	Winner	Second	Third
3 January 2014	HS106	WC	(Japan) Sara Takanashi	(Germany) Carina Vogt	(Russia) Irina Avvakumova
4 January 2014	HS106	WC	(Russia) Irina Avvakumova	(Germany) Carina Vogt	(Japan) Sara Takanashi
(night) 5 September 2015	HS106	SGP	(Japan) Sara Takanashi	(Norway) Maren Lundby	(Norway) Line Jahr
6 September 2015	HS106	SGP	(Japan) Sara Takanashi	(Japan) Yūki Itō	(Norway) Line Jahr
10 September 2016	HS106	SGP	(Japan) Sara Takanashi	(Norway) Maren Lundby	(Slovenia) Maja Vtič
11 September 2016	HS106	SGP	(Japan) Sara Takanashi	(Germany) Carina Vogt	(Russia) Irina Avvakumova
9 September 2017	HS102	SGP	(Japan) Sara Takanashi	(Finland) Julia Kykkänen	(Russia) Irina Avvakumova
10 September 2017	HS102	SGP	(Japan) Sara Takanashi	(Russia) Irina Avvakumova	(Norway) Maren Lundby
9 September 2018	HS140	SGP	(Slovenia) Ema Klinec	(Norway) Maren Lundby	(Japan) Sara Takanashi

=== Mixed team ===
Date	Hillsize	Competition	Winner	Second	Third
8 September 2018	HS140	SGP	Japan Nozomi Maruyama; Yukiya Satō; Sara Takanashi; Junshirō Kobayashi	Slovenia Jerneja Brecl; Jurij Tepeš; Ema Klinec; Robert Kranjec	Norway Anna Odine Strøm; Robin Pedersen; Maren Lundby; Fredrik Bjerkeengen
