= FIS Ski Jumping Grand Prix =

Ski jumping competition

Ski Jumping Summer Grand Prix
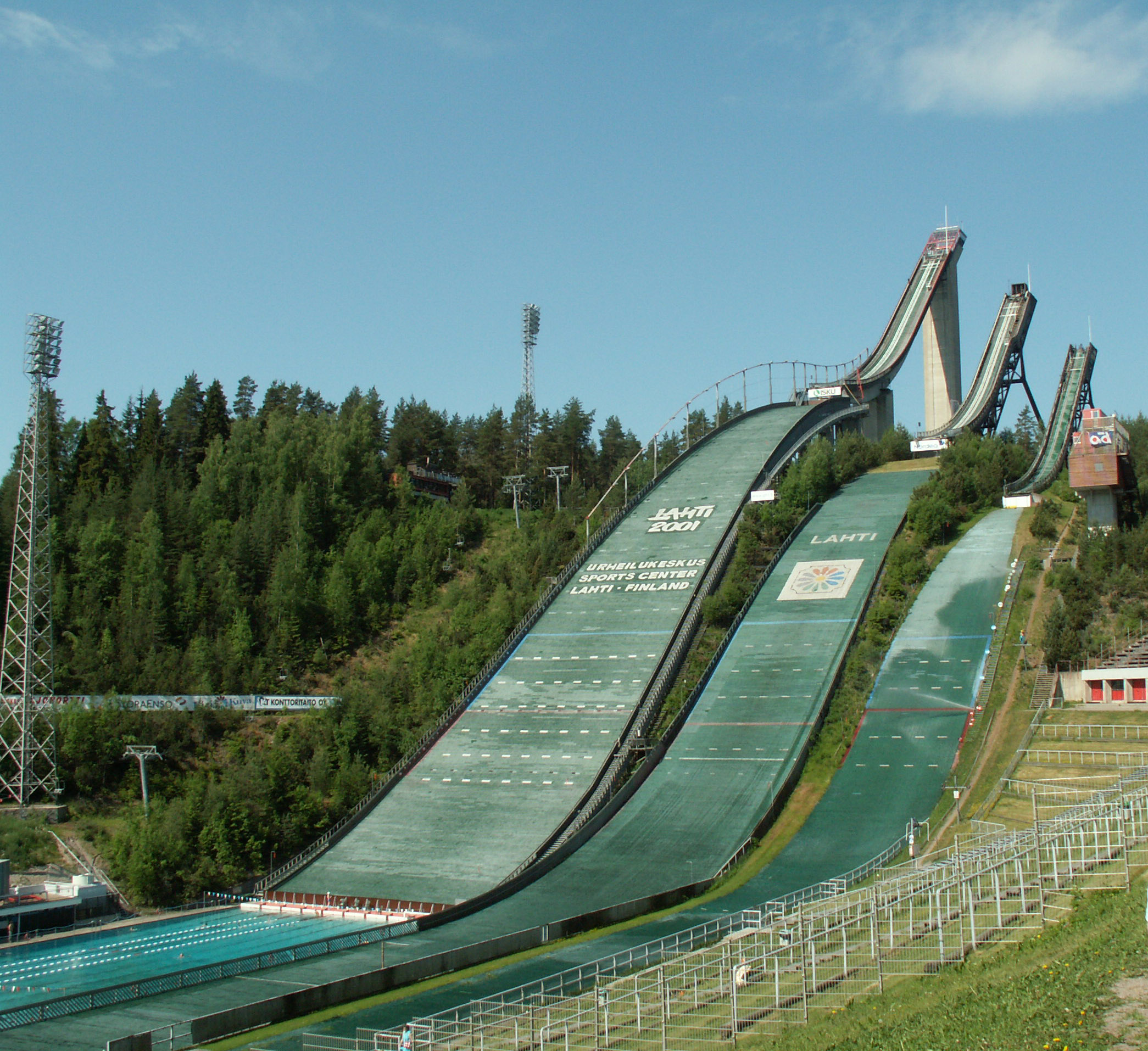
- Genre: summer ski jumping
- Locations: Europe, Japan, Russia, Kazakhstan
- Inaugurated: 28 August 1994 (men); 28 August 1994 (men's team); 14 August 2012 (mixed team); 15 August 2012 (ladies)
- Organiser: International Ski Federation
- People: Sandro Pertille (men); Chika Yoshida (women)

The FIS Ski Jumping Grand Prix is a summer circuit yearly arranged by International Ski Federation. This competition for men was first arranged in 1994 and for the first time for women in 2012. The competition is held on ski jumps with artificial surfaces. There are about 10 competitions per season, held in the months between July and October. Regular venues for the competition are Courchevel, Hakuba, Einsiedeln, Wisła, Hinterzarten and Klingenthal. First official mixed team event with four jumpers (two men and two women) was organized in 2012. The most successful participants are Adam Małysz and Thomas Morgenstern, each having won the Grand Prix three times.

A similar level of competition held in winter is the World Cup; the lower circuits include the Continental Cup, the FIS Cup, the FIS Race and the Alpen Cup.

== Men's standings ==
=== Overall ===
Season	Winner	Second	Third
1994	(Japan) Takanobu Okabe	(Finland) Ari-Pekka Nikkola	(Austria) Andreas Goldberger
1995	(Austria) Andreas Goldberger	(Japan) Kazuyoshi Funaki	(Finland) Ari-Pekka Nikkola
1996	(Finland) Ari-Pekka Nikkola	(Finland) Mika Laitinen	(Japan) Masahiko Harada
1997	(Japan) Masahiko Harada	(Norway) Espen Bredesen	(Austria) Martin Höllwarth
1998	(Japan) Masahiko Harada	(Japan) Kazuyoshi Funaki	(Germany) Martin Schmitt
1999	(Germany) Sven Hannawald	(Austria) Andreas Goldberger	(Finland) Janne Ahonen
2000	(Finland) Janne Ahonen	(Finland) Matti Hautamäki	(Japan) Hideharu Miyahira
2001	(Poland) Adam Małysz	(Austria) Andreas Goldberger	(Austria) Stefan Horngacher
2002	(Austria) Andreas Widhölzl	(Finland) Janne Ahonen	(United States) Clint Jones
2003	(Austria) Thomas Morgenstern	(Finland) Akseli Kokkonen	(Austria) Martin Höllwarth
2004	(Poland) Adam Małysz	(Austria) Martin Höllwarth	(Norway) Daniel Forfang
2005	(Czech Republic) Jakub Janda	(Austria) Wolfgang Loitzl	(Austria) Thomas Morgenstern
2006	(Poland) Adam Małysz	(Austria) Wolfgang Loitzl	(Austria) Andreas Kofler
2007	(Austria) Thomas Morgenstern	(Poland) Adam Małysz	(Austria) Gregor Schlierenzauer
2008	(Austria) Gregor Schlierenzauer	(Switzerland) Simon Ammann	(Germany) Michael Uhrmann
2009	(Switzerland) Simon Ammann	(Slovenia) Robert Kranjec	(Poland) Adam Małysz
2010	(Japan) Daiki Itō	(Poland) Kamil Stoch	(Poland) Adam Małysz
2011	(Austria) Thomas Morgenstern	(Poland) Kamil Stoch	(Norway) Tom Hilde
2012	(Germany) Andreas Wank	(Slovenia) Jurij Tepeš	(Japan) Taku Takeuchi
2013	(Germany) Andreas Wellinger	(Slovenia) Jernej Damjan	(Norway) Anders Bardal
2014	(Slovenia) Jernej Damjan	(Norway) Phillip Sjøen	(Japan) Taku Takeuchi
2015	(Japan) Kento Sakuyama	(Norway) Kenneth Gangnes	(Slovenia) Robert Kranjec
2016	(Poland) Maciej Kot	(Germany) Andreas Wellinger	(Poland) Kamil Stoch
2017	(Poland) Dawid Kubacki	(Slovenia) Anže Lanišek	(Japan) Junshirō Kobayashi
2018	(Russia) Evgeniy Klimov	(Germany) Karl Geiger	(Poland) Piotr Żyła
2019	(Poland) Dawid Kubacki	(Japan) Yukiya Satō	(Slovenia) Timi Zajc
2020	(Poland) Dawid Kubacki	(Poland) Kamil Stoch	(Poland) Piotr Żyła
2021	(Norway) Halvor Egner Granerud	(Poland) Dawid Kubacki	(Austria) Jan Hörl
2022	(Poland) Dawid Kubacki	(Austria) Manuel Fettner	(Poland) Kamil Stoch
2023	(Bulgaria) Vladimir Zografski	(Switzerland) Gregor Deschwanden	(Japan) Ren Nikaido
2024	(Poland) Paweł Wąsek	(Austria) Stefan Kraft	(Norway) Marius Lindvik
2025	(Germany) Philipp Raimund	(Japan) Sakutaro Kobayashi	(Austria) Niklas Bachlinger
2026	(Japan) Naoki Nakamura		

=== Nations Cup ===
Season	Winner	Second	Third
1999	Japan	Austria	Germany
2000	Finland	Japan	Norway
2001	Austria	Japan	Slovenia
2002	Austria	Finland	United States
2003	Austria	Finland	Slovenia
2004	Austria	Japan	Norway
2005	Austria	Czech Republic	Germany
2006	Austria	Norway	Finland
2007	Austria	Poland	Germany
2008	Austria	Germany	Switzerland
2009	Norway	Japan	Austria
2010	Poland	Japan	Austria
2011	Austria	Poland	Germany
2012	Japan	Germany	Slovenia
2013	Germany	Poland	Slovenia
2014	Norway	Slovenia	Germany
2015	Germany	Poland	Japan
2016	Poland	Slovenia	Germany
2017	Poland	Norway	Slovenia
2018	Poland	Japan	Germany
2019	Japan	Poland	Slovenia
2020	Poland	Slovenia	Switzerland
2021	Norway	Austria	Poland
2022	Poland	Austria	Germany
2023	Austria	Germany	Poland
2024	Austria	Norway	Poland
2025	Austria	Japan	Poland
2026			

=== Poland Tour ===
Season	Winner	Second	Third
2011	(Austria) Thomas Morgenstern	(Austria) Gregor Schlierenzauer	(Poland) Kamil Stoch

=== Four Nations Grand Prix ===
Season	Winner	Second	Third
2006	(Austria) Andreas Kofler	(Poland) Adam Małysz	(Austria) Gregor Schlierenzauer
2007	(Austria) Thomas Morgenstern	(Poland) Adam Małysz	(Austria) Gregor Schlierenzauer
2008	(Austria) Gregor Schlierenzauer	(Austria) Andreas Kofler	(Switzerland) Simon Ammann
2009	(Switzerland) Simon Ammann	(Poland) Adam Małysz	(Russia) Denis Kornilov
Three Nations Grand Prix
2010	(Poland) Adam Małysz	(Austria) Thomas Morgenstern	(Japan) Daiki Itō

== Women's standings ==
=== Overall ===
Season	Winner	Second	Third
2012	(Japan) Sara Takanashi	(Canada) Alexandra Pretorius	(Austria) Daniela Iraschko
2013	(Japan) Sara Takanashi	(France) Coline Mattel	(Slovenia) Katja Požun
2014	(Japan) Sara Takanashi	(Germany) Katharina Althaus	(Russia) Irina Avvakumova
2015	(Japan) Sara Takanashi	(Japan) Yūki Itō	(United States) Nita Englund
2016	(Japan) Sara Takanashi	(Germany) Carina Vogt	(Russia) Irina Avvakumova (2)
2017	(Japan) Sara Takanashi	(Russia) Irina Avvakumova	(Norway) Maren Lundby
2018	(Japan) Sara Takanashi	(Slovenia) Ema Klinec	(Norway) Maren Lundby (2)
2019	(Japan) Sara Takanashi (8)	(Slovenia) Nika Križnar	(Germany) Juliane Seyfarth
2020	cancelled due to the COVID-19 pandemic		
2021	(Slovenia) Urša Bogataj	(Japan) Sara Takanashi	(Austria) Marita Kramer
2022	(Slovenia) Urša Bogataj (2)	(Slovenia) Nika Križnar (2)	(France) Joséphine Pagnier
2023	(Slovenia) Nika Križnar	(Japan) Sara Takanashi (2)	(Canada) Alexandria Loutitt
2024	(Italy) Lara Malsiner	(Italy) Annika Sieff	(Japan) Sara Takanashi
2025	(Japan) Nozomi Maruyama	(Slovenia) Nika Prevc	(Japan) Sara Takanashi (2)
2026	(Slovenia) Ema Klinec	(Poland) Anna Twardosz	(Japan) Yūki Itō

=== Nations Cup ===
Season	Winner	Second	Third
2012	Japan	Germany	Austria
2013	Japan	Germany	Slovenia
2014	Japan	Slovenia	Russia
2015	Japan	Slovenia	Russia
2016	Japan	Germany	Russia
2017	Japan	Slovenia	Russia
2018	Japan	Slovenia (4)	Germany
2019	Slovenia	Japan	Germany
2020	cancelled due to the COVID-19 pandemic		
2021	Slovenia	Japan	Russia (5)
2022	Slovenia	Germany (4)	Austria (2)
2023	Slovenia (4)	Japan (3)	Germany (3)
2024	Japan (8)	Italy	Slovenia (2)
2025	Japan (9)	Slovenia (5)	Germany (4)
2026			

== Men's statistics ==
retired male ski jumper

Events	Winners
228	79

update: 7 October 2023

=== Wins ===
Rank		Wins
1	(Poland) Dawid Kubacki	14
2	(Poland) Adam Małysz	13
	(Austria) Gregor Schlierenzauer	13
4	(Poland) Kamil Stoch	12
5	(Japan) Masahiko Harada	10
	(Austria) Thomas Morgenstern	10
7	(Austria) Andreas Widhölzl	9
8	(Poland) Maciej Kot	7
9	(Switzerland) Simon Ammann	6
10	(Finland) Janne Ahonen	5
	(Czech Republic) Jakub Janda	5
	(Japan) Ryōyū Kobayashi	5
	(Germany) Andreas Wellinger	5

=== Podiums ===
Rank		Podiums
1	(Poland) Adam Małysz	28
2	(Poland) Kamil Stoch	27
2	(Austria) Thomas Morgenstern	26
	(Austria) Gregor Schlierenzauer	26
5	(Poland) Dawid Kubacki	24
6	(Finland) Janne Ahonen	19
7	(Switzerland) Simon Ammann	16
	(Poland) Piotr Żyła	16
9	(Japan) Masahiko Harada	14
10	(Poland) Maciej Kot	13

Overall titles (after 2025, including jumpers who have won at least once or scored second at least twice, excluding info about a jumper being retired)
Rank	Name	First	Second	Third
1	(Poland) Adam Małysz	3	1	2
2	(Poland) Dawid Kubacki	3	1	0
3	(Austria) Thomas Morgenstern	3	0	1
4	(Japan) Masahiko Harada	2	0	1
5	(Austria) Andreas Goldberger	1	2	1
6	(Finland) Ari-Pekka Nikkola	1	1	1
6	(Finland) Janne Ahonen	1	1	1
8	(Switzerland) Simon Ammann	1	1	0
8	(Germany) Andreas Wellinger	1	1	0
8	(Slovenia) Jernej Damjan	1	1	0
11	(Austria) Gregor Schlierenzauer	1	0	1
12	(Japan) Takanobu Okabe	1	0	0
12	(Germany) Sven Hannawald	1	0	0
12	(Austria) Andreas Widhölzl	1	0	0
12	(Czech Republic) Jakub Janda	1	0	0
12	(Japan) Daiki Ito	1	0	0
12	(Germany) Andreas Wank	1	0	0
12	(Japan) Kento Sakuyama	1	0	0
12	(Poland) Maciej Kot	1	0	0
12	(Russia) Evgenii Klimov	1	0	0
12	(Norway) Halvor Egner Granerud	1	0	0
12	(Bulgaria) Vladimir Zografski	1	0	0
12	(Poland) Paweł Wąsek	1	0	0
12	(Germany) Philipp Raimund	1	0	0
25	(Poland) Kamil Stoch	0	2	2
26	(Japan) Kazuyoshi Funaki	0	2	0
26	(Austria) Wolfgang Loitzl	0	2	0

== Women's statistics ==
retired female ski jumper

Events	Winners
53	11

update: 7 October 2023

=== Wins ===
Rank		Wins
1	(Japan) Sara Takanashi	26
2	(Slovenia) Nika Križnar	9
3	(Slovenia) Urša Bogataj	7
4	(Slovenia) Ema Klinec	3
5	(Canada) Alexandra Pretorius	2
6	(Austria) Daniela Iraschko-Stolz	1
	(Germany) Katharina Schmid	1
	(Japan) Yūki Itō	1
	(Austria) Marita Kramer	1
	(Russia) Irina Avvakumova	1
	(Austria) Eva Pinkelnig	1

=== Podiums ===
Rank		Podiums
1	(Japan) Sara Takanashi	36
2	(Slovenia) Nika Križnar	14
3	(Japan) Yūki Itō	13
4	(Slovenia) Urša Bogataj	12
5	(Norway) Maren Lundby	9
	(Slovenia) Ema Klinec	9
7	(Russia) Irina Avvakumova	6
8	(Austria) Marita Kramer	5
9	(Slovenia) Katja Požun	4
	(Canada) Alexandra Pretorius	4
	(Germany) Katharina Schmid	4
	(Canada) Alexandria Loutitt	4

Overall titles (after 2025, including jumpers who have won at least once or scored second at least twice, excluding info about a jumper being retired)
Rank	Name	First	Second	Third
1	(Japan) Sara Takanashi	8	2	2
2	(Slovenia) Urša Bogataj	2	0	0
3	(Slovenia) Nika Križnar	1	2	0
4	(Italy) Lara Malsiner	1	0	0
4	(Japan) Nozomi Maruyama	1	0	0
