= FIS Ski Jumping Alpen Cup =

Annual ski jumping competition in the Alps

The FIS Ski Jumping Alpen Cup (known as Alpen Cup) is a ski jumping tournament held in Alps yearly by the International Ski Federation since 1990.

== History ==
The first season of this competition took place in the 1990/91 season. The summer season was introduced in 1996/97. In the 1999/00 season two separate classifications, summer and winter, were introduced for the first time, while both together counted for overall classification. From the 2000–01 season one only overall classification exists, joining the points from summer and winter together.

This competition is only for junior ski jumpers of maximum 20 years old. Until the 2005/06 season, the limit was 18 years old. Until the 2006–07 season, only jumpers from Alpine countries were allowed to compete. From the 2007/08 season onward, ski jumpers from Eastern European countries: Bulgarians, Czechs, Poles, Romanians, Slovaks and Hungarians, can compete too.

In the years 2000-2004 and from the 2013/14 season, the Alpen Cup takes place also in the women's category.

Higher competitive circuits are the World Cup, the Summer Grand Prix and the Continental Cup; the lower circuits include the FIS Cup and the FIS Race.

== Men's standings ==
=== Overall ===
Season	Winner	Second	Third
1990/91	(Socialist Federal Republic of Yugoslavia) Damjan Fras	(Germany) Gerd Segmund	(Germany) Marc Noelke
1991/92	(Austria) Andreas Beck	(Austria) Christian Reinthaler	(France) Jerome Gay
1992/93	(Austria) Adolf Grugger	(Austria) Andreas Beck (Austria) Gerhard Gattinger (Austria) Gerhard Schallert	
1993/94	(Austria) Andreas Widhölzl	(Slovenia) Anže Zupan	(Austria) Reinhard Schwarzenberger
1994/95	(Slovenia) Jaka Grosar	(Austria) Karl-Heinz Dorner	(Slovenia) Primož Peterka
1995/96	(Slovenia) Primož Peterka	(Slovenia) Matija Stegnar	(Austria) Markus Eigentler
1996/97	(Austria) Wolfgang Loitzl	(Austria) Markus Eigentler	(Austria) Falko Krismayr
1997/98	(Germany) Georg Späth	(Austria) Martin Koch	(Slovenia) Tadej Lenič
1998/99	(Slovenia) Primož Urh-Zupan	(Austria) Florian Liegl	(Austria) Stefan Kaiser
1999/00	(Austria) Manuel Fettner	(Austria) Stefan Kaiser	(Austria) Stefan Thurnbichler
2000/01	(Germany) Jörg Ritzerfeld	(Austria) Mathias Hafele	(Germany) Maximilian Mechler
2001/02	(Germany) Maximilian Mechler	(Slovenia) Rok Benkovič	(Austria) Christoph Strickner
2002/03	(Slovenia) Rok Urbanc	(Slovenia) Jaka Oblak	(Austria) Roland Müller
2003/04	(Germany) Tobias Bogner	(Slovenia) Jurij Tepeš	(Germany) Julian Musiol
2004/05	(Austria) Arthur Pauli	(Slovenia) Jurij Tepeš	(Slovenia) Nejc Frank
2005/06	(Austria) Mario Innauer	(Austria) Arthur Pauli	(Austria) Thomas Thurnbichler
2006/07	(Slovenia) Mitja Mežnar	(Austria) David Unterberger	(Germany) Tobias Bogner
2007/08	(Austria) David Unterberger	(Germany) Danny Queck	(Austria) Manuel Poppinger
2008/09	(Austria) Lukas Müller	(Austria) Michael Hayböck	(Austria) Manuel Poppinger
2009/10	(Austria) Thomas Diethart	(Austria) Johannes Obermayr	(Austria) Thomas Lackner
2010/11	(Austria) Thomas Lackner	(Austria) Stefan Kraft	(Slovenia) Jaka Hvala
2011/12	(Slovenia) Anže Lanišek	(Slovenia) Jaka Hvala	(Slovenia) Rok Justin
2012/13	(Slovenia) Cene Prevc	(Slovenia) Matic Benedik	(Austria) Elias Tollinger
2013/14	(Austria) Patrick Streitler	(Austria) Elias Tollinger	(Germany) Sebastian Bradatsch
2014/15	(Austria) Simon Greider	(Slovenia) Cene Prevc	(France) Paul Brasme
2015/16	(Germany) Jonathan Siegel	(Germany) Adrian Sell	(Italy) Alex Insam
2016/17	(Slovenia) Žiga Jelar	(Slovenia) Timi Zajc	(Austria) Markus Rupitsch
2017/18	(Switzerland) Sandro Hauswirth	(Slovenia) Jan Kus	(Slovenia) Žiga Jelar
2018/19	(Austria) David Haagen	(Switzerland) Dominik Peter	(Germany) Luca Roth
2019/20	(Austria) Marco Wörgötter	(Slovenia) Mark Hafnar	(Slovenia) Žak Mogel
2020/21	(Austria) Markus Müller	(Austria) Marco Wörgötter	(Austria) Julijan Smid
2021/22	(Austria) Maximilian Ortner	(Slovenia) Mark Hafnar	(Slovenia) Maksim Bartolj
2022/23	(Austria) Stephan Embacher	(Slovenia) Maksim Bartolj	(Austria) Louis Obersteiner
2023/24	(Germany) Jannik Faißt	(Austria) Simon Steinberger	(Austria) Johannes Pölz

=== Summer ===
Season	Winner	Second	Third
1999	(Germany) Uli Basler	(Austria) Stefan Thurnbichler	(Slovenia) Primož Urh-Zupan (Slovenia) Jure Bogataj

== Ladies' standings ==
=== Overall ===
Season	Winner	Second	Third
2000/01	(Austria) Daniela Iraschko	(Austria) Eva Ganster	(Germany) Heidi Roth
2001/02	(Austria) Daniela Iraschko (Austria) Eva Ganster		(Germany) Angelika Kühhorn
2002/03	(Austria) Daniela Iraschko	(Austria) Eva Ganster	(Austria) Katrin Stefaner
2003/04	(Austria) Daniela Iraschko	(Slovenia) Monika Pogladič	(Austria) Eva Ganster
2012/13	(Slovenia) Ema Klinec	(Germany) Ramona Straub	(Austria) Chiara Hölzl
2013/14	(Austria) Elisabeth Raudaschl	(Germany) Melanie Haeckert	(Germany) Anna Rupprecht
2014/15	(Germany) Agnes Reisch	(Austria) Elisabeth Raudaschl	(Germany) Luisa Goerlich
2015/16	(Germany) Agnes Reisch	(Italy) Lara Malsiner	(Austria) Julia Huber
2016/17	(Germany) Selina Freitag	(Slovenia) Jerneja Brecl	(Slovenia) Katra Komar
2017/18	(Germany) Jenny Nowak	(Austria) Lisa Eder	(Germany) Alexandra Seifert
2018/19	(Austria) Lisa Hirner	(Slovenia) Jerneja Repinc Zupančič	(Germany) Josephin Laue
2019/20	(Italy) Jessica Malsiner	(Italy) Annika Sieff	(Austria) Vanessa Moharitsch
2020/21	(Slovenia) Nika Prevc	(Austria) Vanessa Moharitsch	(Austria) Hannah Wiegele
2021/22	(Slovenia) Nika Prevc	(Slovenia) Jerneja Repinc Zupančič	(Switzerland) Emely Torazza
2022/23	(France) Lilou Zepchi	(Slovenia) Taja Bodlaj	(Slovenia) Tinkara Komar
2023/24	(Slovenia) Tina Erzar	(Austria) Meghann Wadsak	(France) Lilou Zepchi
