= Markus Schiffner =

Austrian ski jumper

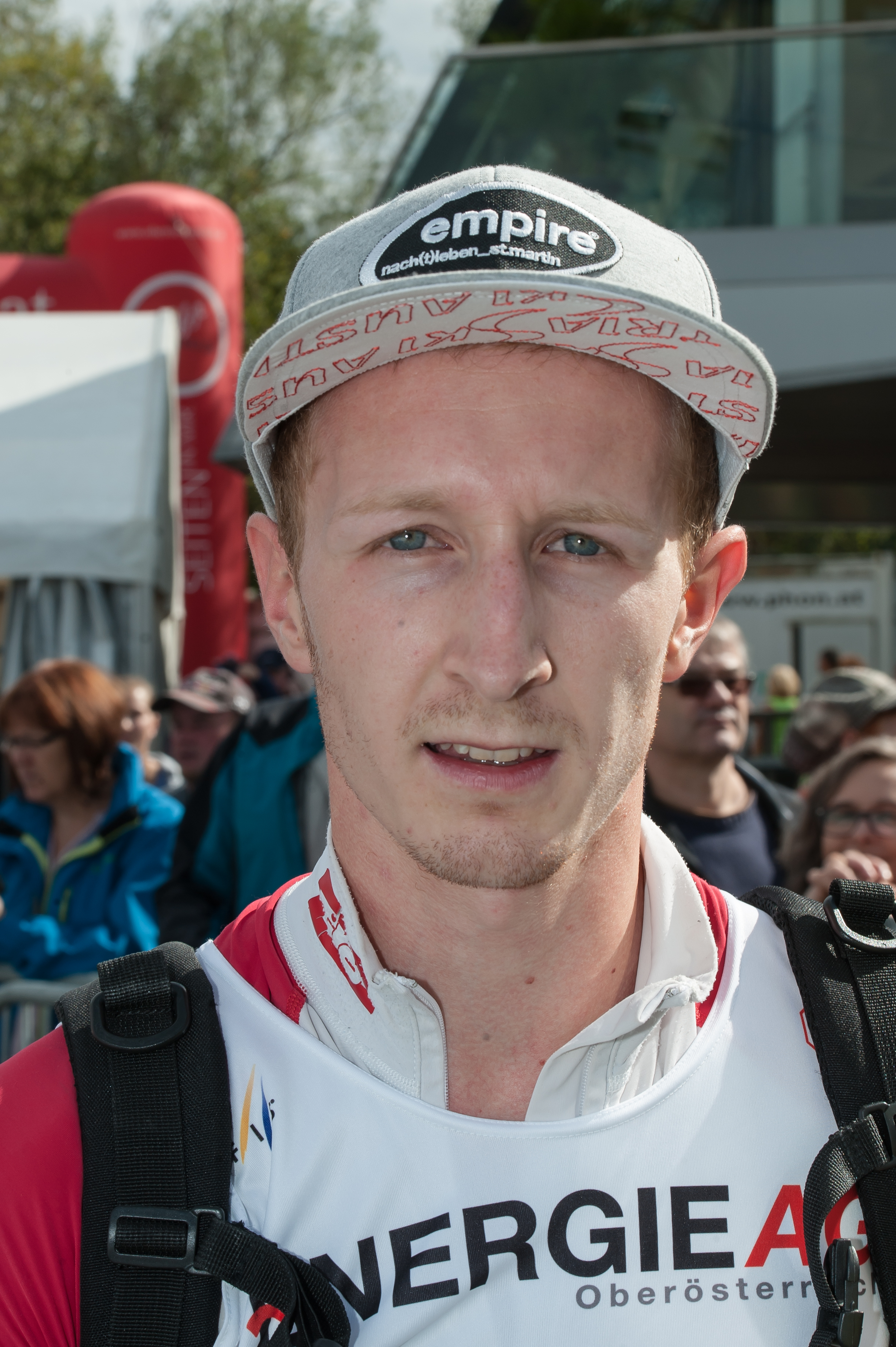

Markus Schiffner (born 5 June 1992 in Linz) is an Austrian ski jumper.

== Career ==
Schiffner made his international debut in a FIS race in Hinterzarten on 23 February 2008. His first World Cup competition was 4 January 2014 in Innsbruck, Austria, where he finished as number 46. He received his first World Cup points in Engelberg in 2015, and his best individual result is an 11th place in Bischofshofen in 2017.

== World Cup results ==
=== Season standings ===
Season	Overall	Ski-Flying	Four Hills Tournament
2013–14	-	–	65
2015–16	65	–	59
2016–17	37	-	21
