= Tomáš Zmoray =

Slovak ski jumper (born 1989)

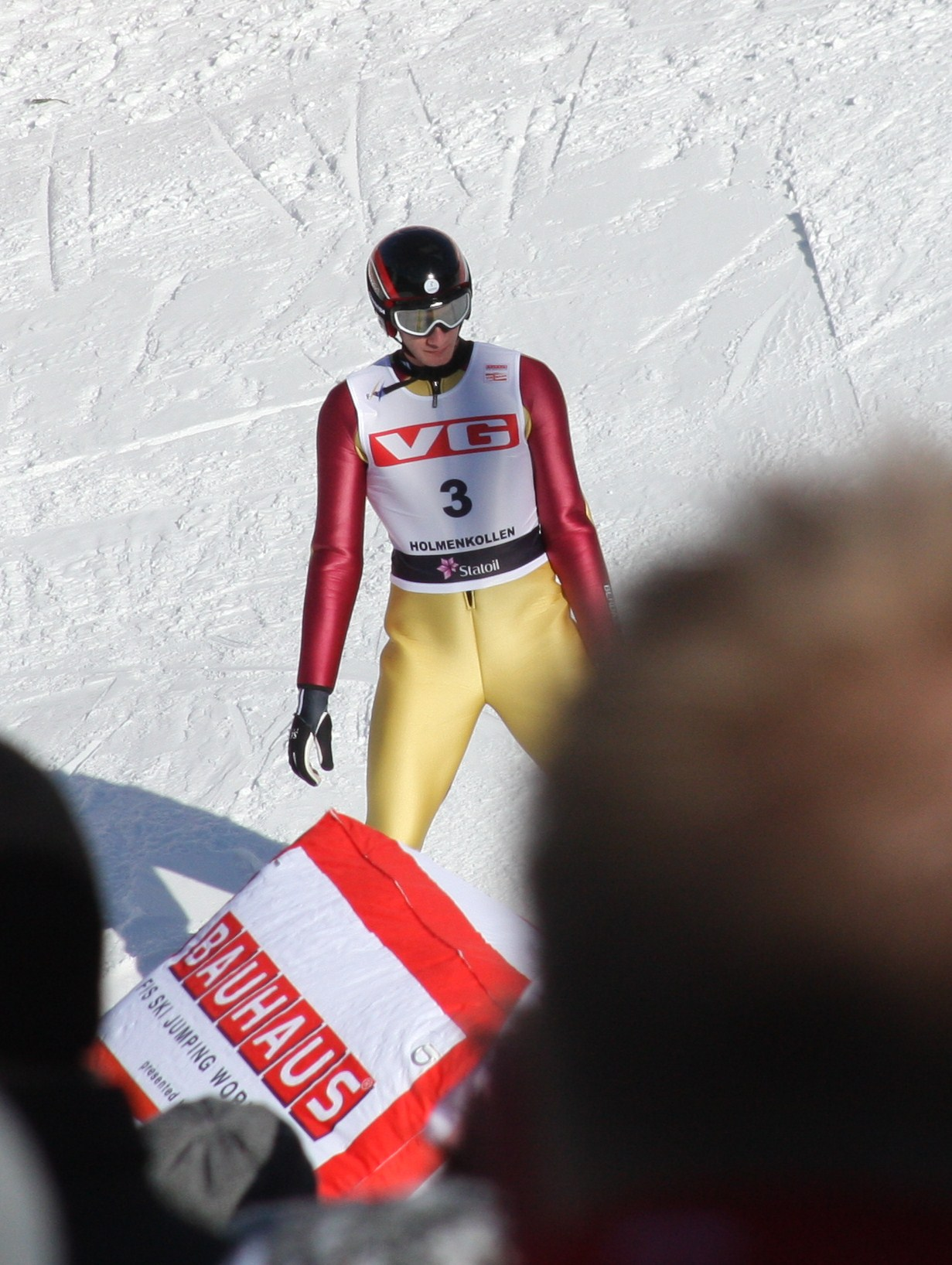
Tomáš Zmoray

Tomáš Zmoray (born 26 July 1989 in Banská Bystrica) is a Slovak ski jumper who has competed since 2005. At the 2010 Winter Olympics in Vancouver, he finished 42nd in the individual normal hill and 43rd in the individual large hill events.

At the FIS Nordic World Ski Championships 2009 in Liberec, Zmoray finished 50th in the individual normal hill event.

His best World Cup finish was 36th in the individual large hill event in Oslo, at Holmenkollbakken in March 2010.
