= Vogtland Arena =

Ski jumping venue in Klingenthal, Germany

Coordinates: 50°23′02″N 12°26′56″E

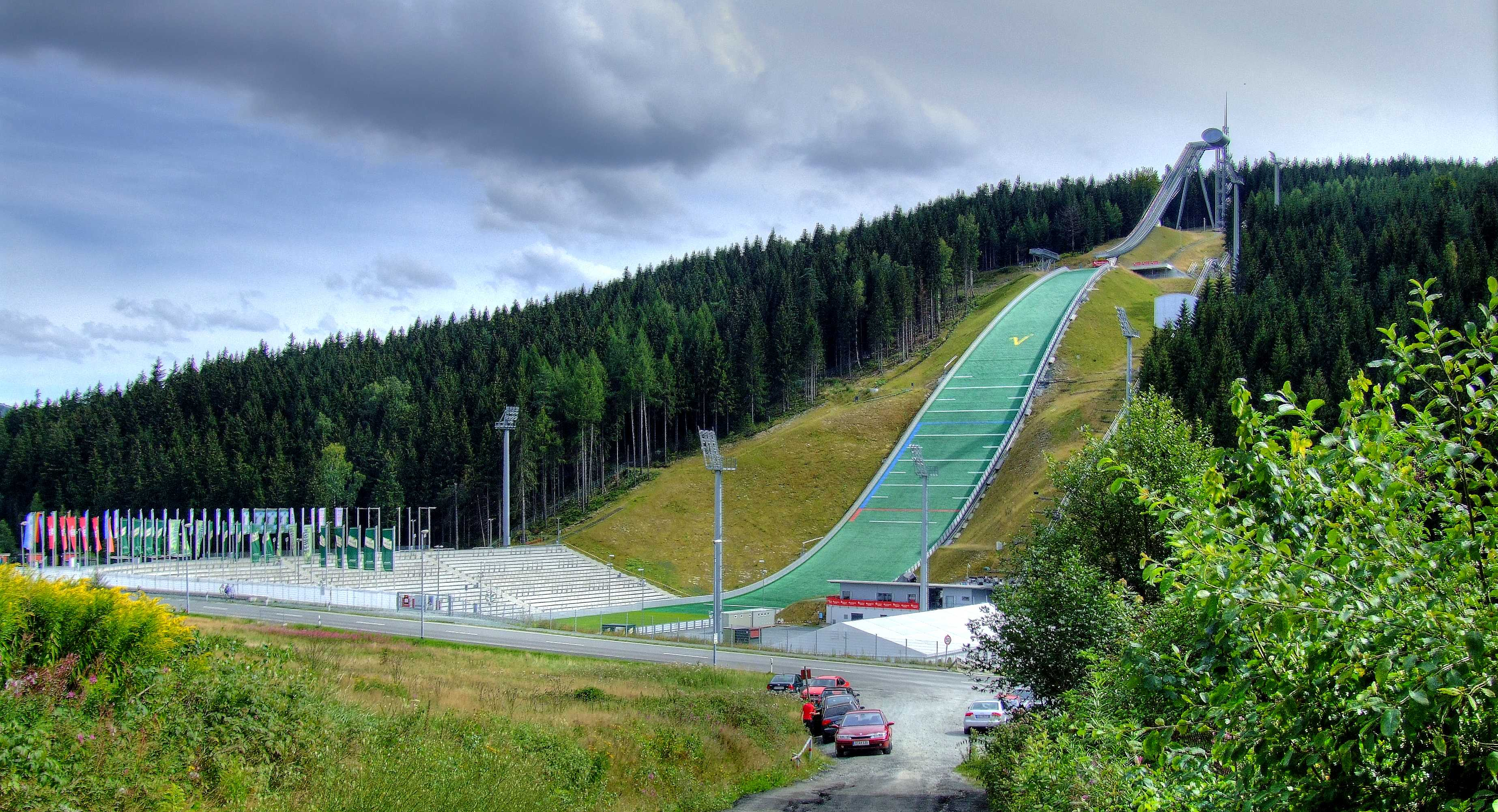
- Location: Klingenthal, Germany
- Opened: 2006

Size
- K–point: K-125
- Hill size: HS140
- Hill record: 146.5 m (481 ft) (Germany) Michael Uhrmann (2 February 2011) (Germany) Andreas Wellinger (10 December 2023) (Switzerland) Gregor Deschwanden (10 December 2023)

The Vogtland Arena is a winter sports center, located in the German town of Klingenthal (Saxony), on the northern slope of the Schwarzberg mountain in Vogtland, from which the complex takes its name. It opened in 2006.

It includes a large ski jumping hill with a construction point of K125 and a size of HS 140 and is one of the most modern architecture among World Cup hills.

== Hill parameters ==
- Construction point: 125 m
- Hill size (HS): 140 m
- Official hill record: 146.5 m – (Germany) Michael Uhrmann (2 February 2011), (Germany) Andreas Wellinger and (Switzerland) Gregor Deschwanden (10 December 2023)
- Hill record: 149.5 m – (Norway) Marius Lindvik (24 February 2018)
- Inrun length: 97.5 m
- Inrun angle: 35°
- Take-off length: 6.8 m
- Take-off angle: 11°
- Take-off height: 3.25 m
- Landing angle: 34.5°
- Average speed: 93.9 km/h

== History ==
Vogtland Arena was constructed from 2003 to 2005. Its official inaugural event was a Nordic combined Summer Grand Prix competition on 27 August 2006. Before that, in February 2006, the Czech national ski jumping championships had already been held there. In March 2006, Vogtland Arena saw a second-tier Nordic combined world cup competition and in September 2006 a Summer Grand Prix in ski jumping. On 7 February 2007, local club VSC Klingenthal took over one of the cancelled Ski Jumping World Cup events of Harrachov, making this the first FIS winter competition at the arena. Once again in 2007, a Summer Grand Prix ski jumping event took place there. In January 2008, the arena saw its first Nordic Combined World Cup event.

Since the 2008–09 season, Klingenthal has been a regular venue of the Ski Jumping World Cup, forming a part of the FIS Team Tour. In 2022, the Continental Cup held its Nordic combined event at Vogtland Arena.
