= Lidiia Iakovleva (ski jumper) =

Russian ski jumper (born 2001)

Lidia Yakovleva
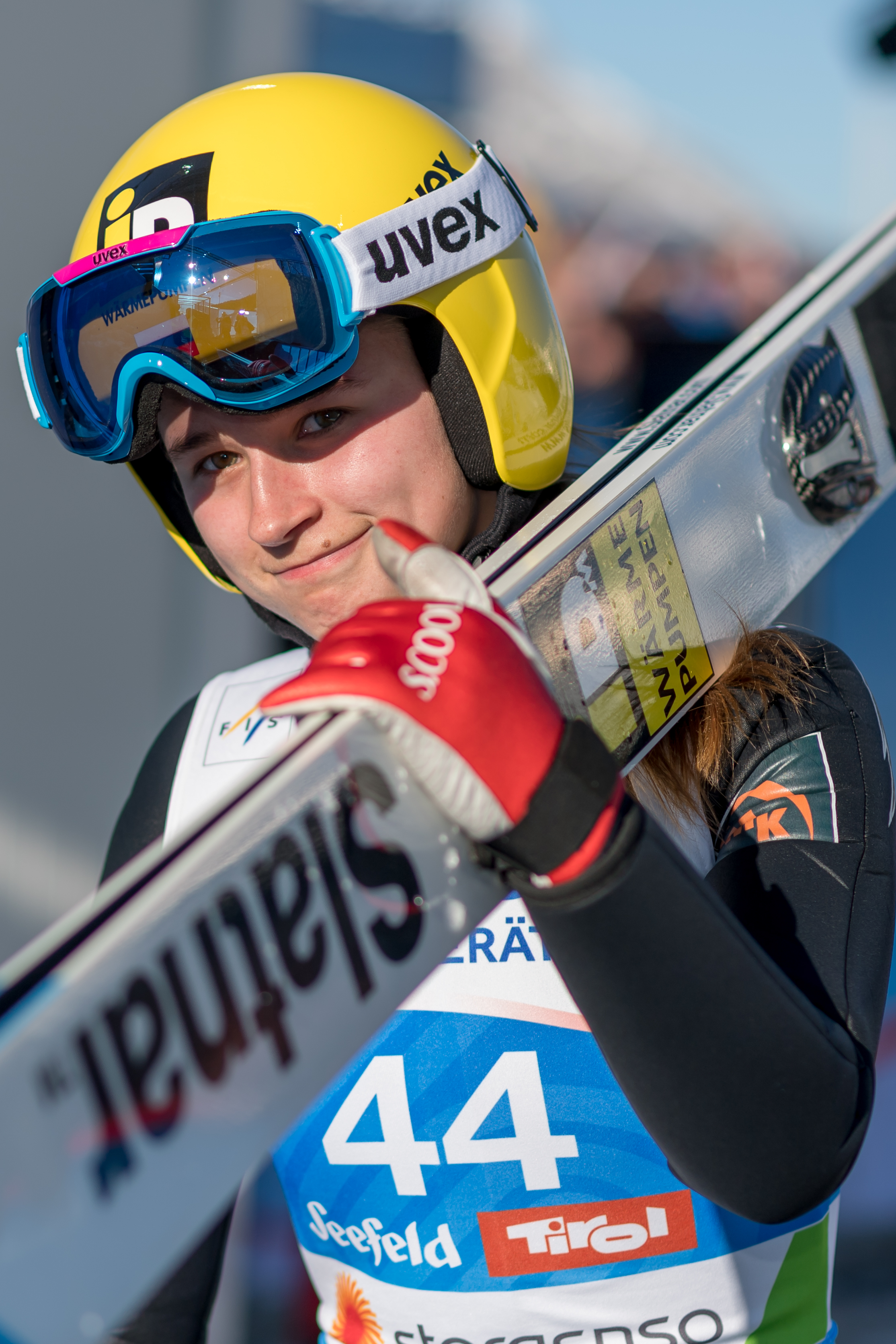

Personal information
- Full name: Lidia Artyomovna Yakovleva
- Nationality: Russia
- Born: 14 August 2001 (age 24) Kirov, Russia

Sport
- Sport: Skiing
- Club: Dynamo Sankt Petersburg

World Cup career
- Seasons: 2018–present
- Indiv. starts: 38
- Indiv. podiums: 1
- Indiv. wins: 1
- Team starts: 3
Medal record
Junior World Championships
Gold medal – first place	2019 Lahti	Team normal hill
Gold medal – first place	2019 Lahti	Mixed normal hill
Silver medal – second place	2019 Lahti	Individual normal hill
- Updated on 13 March 2022

Lidia Artyomovna Yakovleva (Russian: Лидия Артёмовна Яковлева; born 14 August 2001) is a Russian ski jumper.

== Career ==
She won her first World Cup event in Lillehammer in just her fourth World Cup performance.

== World Cup ==
=== Standings ===
Season	Overall	ST	AK	L3	RA	BB
2017/18	—	NA	NA	—	NA	N/A
2018/19	13	NA	NA	4	33	28
2019/20	23	NA	NA	N/A	—	N/A
2021/22	46	33	—	N/A	—	N/A

=== Individual wins ===
No.	Season	Date	Location	Hill	Size
31	2018/19	1 December 2018	(Norway) Lillehammer	Lysgårdsbakken HS98 (night)	NH
