= Irina Avvakumova =

Russian ski jumper (born 1991)

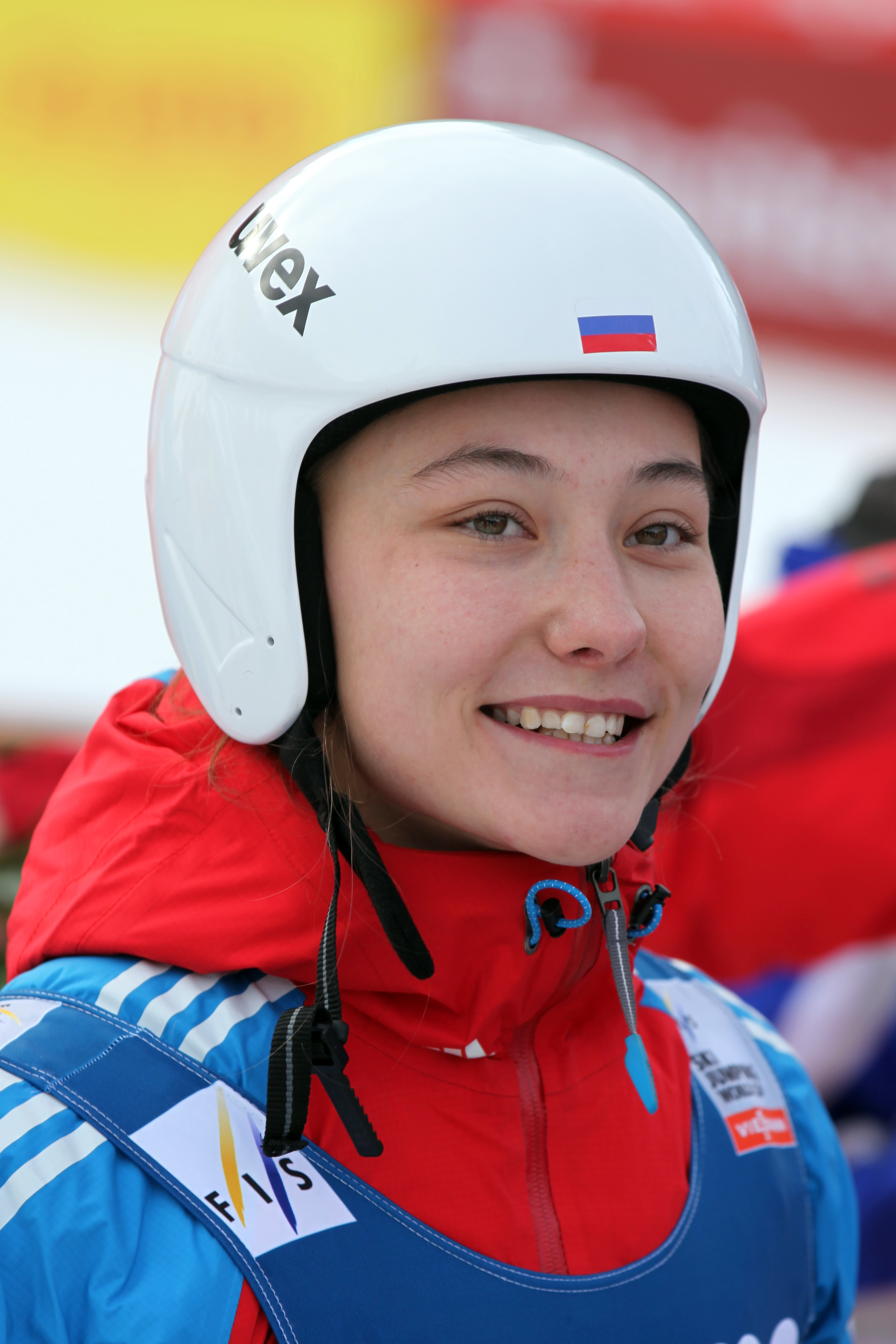
- Avvakumova in Hinterzarten in 2013.

Personal information
- Full name: Irina Andreyevna Taktayeva
- Nationality: Russia
- Born: 14 September 1991 (age 34) Mysa, Gatchinsky District, Leningrad Oblast, RSFSR, USSR (now Russia)

Sport
- Sport: Skiing
- Club: Moscow RGSH Stolitsa; Dinamo

World Cup career
- Seasons: 2012–2022
- Indiv. starts: 145
- Indiv. podiums: 12
- Indiv. wins: 1
- Team starts: 9
- Team podiums: 2
Medal record
Women's ski jumping
Representing ROC
Olympic Games
Silver medal – second place	2022 Beijing	Mixed team
- Updated on 13 March 2022

Irina Andreyevna Avvakumova (née Taktayeva Russian: Ирина Андреевна Аввакумова (Тактаева); born 14 September 1991) is a Russian former ski jumper. She is a multiple-time Russian national ski jumping champion and the Continental Cup winner in the 2012/13 season. At the 2013 Winter Universiade in Predazzo, Avvakumova won a gold medal in the team competition and bronze in the individual competition. She represented Russia at the 2014 Winter Olympics in Sochi, finishing in the 16th position. At the 2018 Winter Olympics, she finished fourth, the best placement of any ski jumper from independent Russia.

== Career ==
=== Early years ===
In 2005 Avvakumova changed from cross-country skiing to ski jumping. In 2011, she participated in her first World Cup event in Lillehammer, placing 40th.

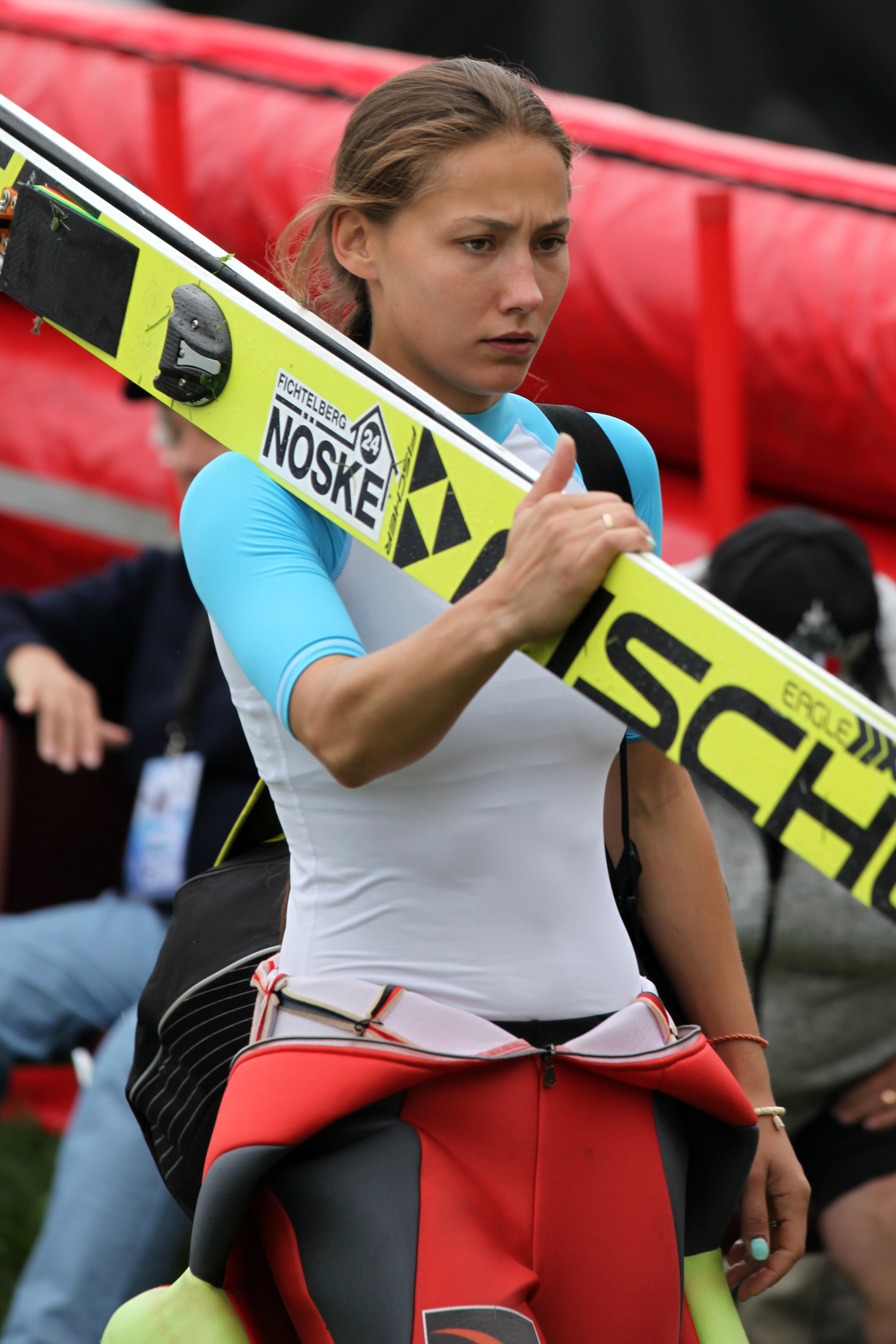
Irina Avvakumova in Courchevel, 2015

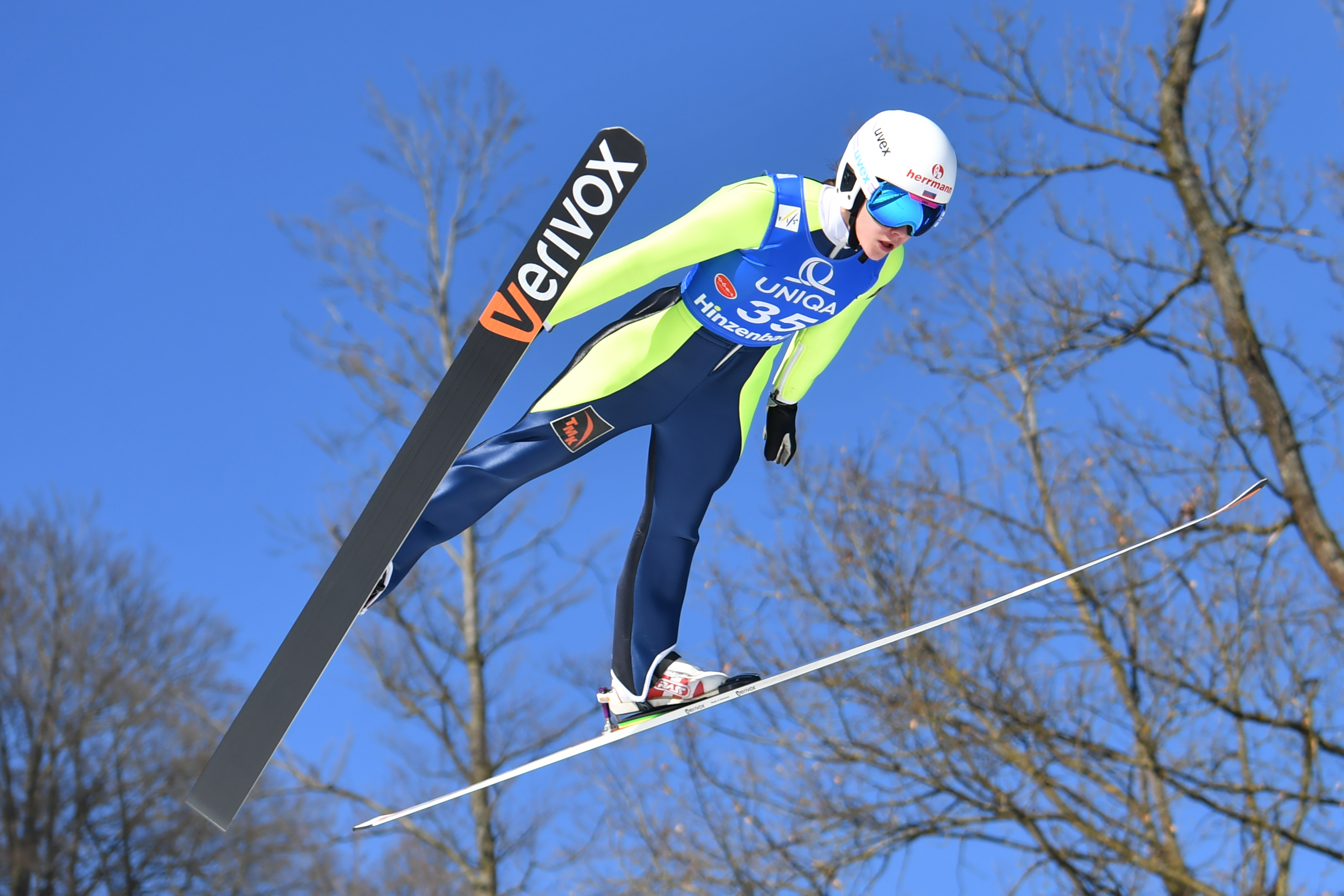
Hinzenbach, Austria, FIS Ski Jumping World Cup Ladies 2017

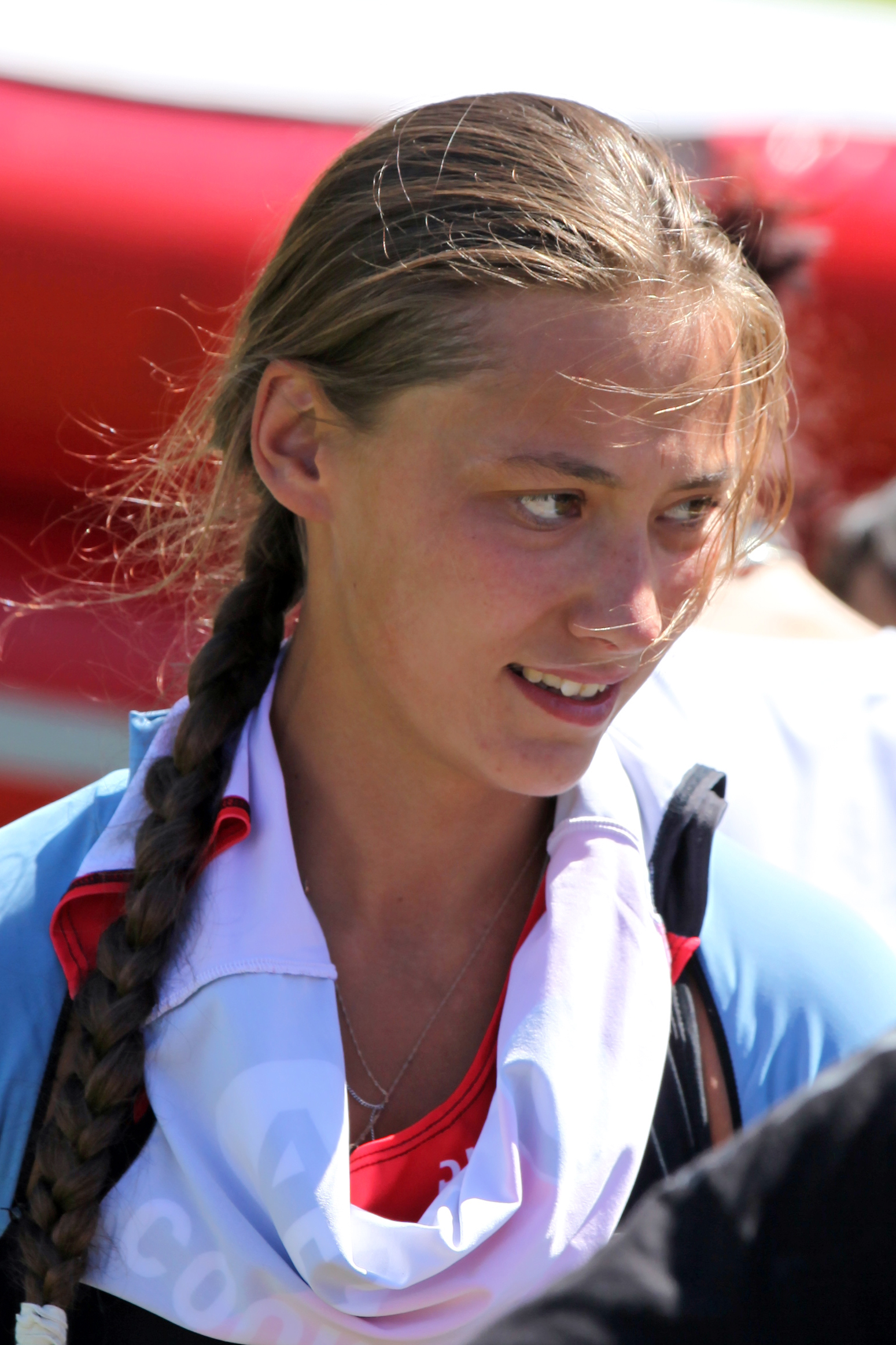
Irina Avvakumova at the Summer Grand Prix ski jumping event in Courchevel.

=== World Cup debut (2012) ===
In 2012 her best World Cup results were the 13th and 14th positions in Zao and Hinzenbach, respectively. With her Russian team, she placed 11th in Lillehammer (23 November 2012). At the Summer Grand Prix Ski Jumping Final in Almaty Avvakumova won the silver medal. In 2012/13, Avvakumova won the Continental Cup, participating in four events and winning three in Örnköldsvik.

=== World Championships (2013) ===
In 2013, she represented Russia in the World Championships in Val di Fiemme and placed 13th in the individual ranking and 9th in the team ranking. At the Summer Grand Prix events in 2013, Avvakumova achieved top ten positions in Hinterzarten 8th and Courchevel 10th.

=== First world cup win (2014) ===
In the World Cup series, Avvakumova established herself among the world's best female jumpers placing third and second at Hinterzarten. On 4 January 2014, she won the World Cup event in Chaykovsky, Russia, becoming the first Russian ski jumper (both male and female) ever to win the World Cup event.

Avvakumova's coaches are Konstantin Shaitanov, Roman Kerov, and Roman Pashkin.

== World Cup ==
=== Standings ===
Season	Overall	ST	AK	L3	RA	BB
2011/12	33	N/A	N/A	N/A	N/A	N/A
2012/13	31	N/A	N/A	N/A	N/A	N/A
2013/14	4	N/A	N/A	N/A	N/A	N/A
2014/15	11	N/A	N/A	N/A	N/A	N/A
2015/16	7	N/A	N/A	N/A	N/A	N/A
2016/17	9	N/A	N/A	N/A	N/A	N/A
2017/18	5	N/A	N/A	6	N/A	N/A
2019/20	19	N/A	N/A	N/A	28	N/A
2020/21	7	N/A	N/A	N/A	N/A	7
2021/22 (Note: On 1 March 2022, following the 2022 Russian invasion of Ukraine, FIS decided not to allow athletes from Russian and Belarus to take part in FIS competitions, with an immediate effect.)	27	17	17	N/A	—	N/A

=== Wins ===
No.	Season	Date	Location	Hill	Size
1	2013/14	4 January 2014	(Russia) Chaykovsky	Snezhinka HS106	NH

== Higher education ==
Since 2009 Avvakumova has studied sports at the Moscow State Academy of Physical Education, Youth and Tourism МГАФК (Московская государственная академия физической культуры, formerly known as МОГИФК) in Malakhovka.

== Private life ==
Avvakumova lives in Chulkovo (Чулково), a small village south east of Moscow. Her mother, Svetlana (Светлана Сергеевна Тактаева), is a teacher at the СОШ №20, the local high school Irina attended.

In Russian media and several rankings, Avvakumova's maiden name Taktaeva (also Taktayeva, Russian Тактаева), is also used or rather used again. On 23 December 2011, Irina Taktaeva married Maxim Avvakumov and from 2012/2013 on all rankings should have changed to Avvakumova, as did the FIS ranking. However, in her new VK account, Irina reverted to her maiden name and explains that she is divorced.

Irina's father's surname, Taktaev, is of Tatar origin, and her father, Andrey, is from Izhevsk (Ижевск), but Irina herself emphasizes that she is Russian.
