= Pöhla =

- Village of Schwarzenberg
- Interactive map of Pöhla
- Location within Germany Location within Saxony
- Coordinates: 50°30′39″N 12°48′57″E
- Country: Germany
- State: Saxony
- District: Aue-Schwarzenberg
- Town: Schwarzenberg
- Subdivisions: 2

Area
  - Total: 11.79 km^{2} (4.55 sq mi)
- Elevation: 550–600 m (1,800–1,970 ft)

Population (2006-12-31)
  - Total: 1,267
  - Density: 107.5/km^{2} (278.3/sq mi)
- Time zone: UTC+01:00 (CET)
  - Summer (DST): UTC+02:00 (CEST)
- Postal codes: 08352
- Dialling codes: 03774
- Vehicle registration: ERZ, ASZ
- Website: www.poehla.de

Pöhla is a village and a former municipality lying in the valley of the river Pöhlwasser, in the district of Aue-Schwarzenberg in Saxony, Germany. Since 1 January 2008, it is part of the town Schwarzenberg.

== Geography ==
=== Constituent communities ===
Pöhla has two main centres, Großpöhla (“Great Pöhla”) with Siegelhof and Kleinpöhla (“Little Pöhla”) with Pfeilhammer.

== History ==
The community of Pöhla only came into being in its current form in the mid 19th century. On 13 December 1855, the two current constituent communities of Großpöhla and Kleinpöhla were joined under the collective name of Pöhla. The name is of Slavic origin and comes from the word bjelo, meaning “light” or “white”, often used in placenames. The community's namesake is the stream that flows through it, called the Pöhlwasser.

At first, the constituent communities of Großpöhla and Kleinpöhla each developed by themselves. The first documentary mention came in 1406 under the names die Behl and die Böhl and refers to an estate. In 1495, the socage records still show only zwene Menner in der Bele (two men). It is assumed that in the first half of the 16th century what was to become the Pfeilhammer – an ironworks – was built on the Pöhlwasser's left bank, raising the population so that in 1551, there were two estate owners, six cottagers and nine other inhabitants in Pöhla. Over the centuries the Pfeilhammer remained one of the village's main employers and contributed to the rise in the villagers’ numbers.

On the other (right) side of the Pöhlwasser, another settlement had been growing at the same time. To distinguish the two places, the name "Kleinpöhla" was used for the one on the left bank and the name "Großpöhla" for the one on the right bank. Not only did the river Pöhlwasser split the two villages apart at this time, but it also marked the boundary between the later united Ämter of Schwarzenberg and Crottendorf. Großpöhla was laid out as a forest homestead village (Waldhufendorf). At the four homesteads dwelt 26 property-owning men, among them eleven “small cottagers”, with their families in the late 16th century. By the early 19th century, Großpöhla already consisted of 75 houses and roughly 750 inhabitants, whose livelihoods lay in, among other things, lace tatting, spoon making, woodworking, mining and ironworking. In the village were a probate court and a secondary customs post from Schwarzenberg. Near the community was found a private limekiln.

Today, Pöhla has almost no more economic importance. It is thought that tourism and winter sport might help the community to a new upswing.

The community is seeking to dissolve its link with the administrative community with Markersbach and Raschau which has stood since 1995, a measure opposed by the mayors and councils of those two communities. A plebiscite held in Pöhla on 26 November 2006 has not come to fruition yet, although a majority voted to split away from the administrative community and at the same time amalgamate with the district seat of Schwarzenberg. Also, a repeated application to Saxony's interior ministry has yet to yield results. Between January and July 2007, Pöhla's councillors let their mandate rest, as on legal grounds they could see no possibility of implementing the plebiscite. The community's mayor approved this move even though it might have been seen as an infringement against the Saxony municipal code. The issue was taken up once again on 19 July because important deeds could not be performed without council resolutions. It is foreseen that on 16 and 24 October, the two partner communities of Markersbach and Raschau, which are seeking a unified community of Raschau-Markersbach, will endorse the existing administrative community's dissolution, thereby paving the way for Pöhla's amalgamation with Schwarzenberg.

=== Population development ===
The following population figures refer to 31 December in each given year.

1982 to 1988

- 1982 − 1738
- 1983 − 1718
- 1984 − 1691
- 1985 − 1625
- 1986 − 1584
- 1987 − 1554
- 1988 − 1537

1989 to 1995

- 1989 − 1469
- 1990 − 1427
- 1991 − 1407
- 1992 − 1387
- 1993 − 1372
- 1994 − 1357
- 1995 − 1356

1996 to 2002

- 1996 − 1357
- 1997 − 1374
- 1998 − 1383
- 1999 − 1402
- 2000 − 1384
- 2001 − 1382
- 2002 − 1352

2003 to 2006

- 2003 − 1316
- 2004 − 1291
- 2005 − 1275
- 2006 − 1267

Source: Statistisches Landesamt des Freistaates Sachsen

== Sightseeing ==
- Visitor mine opened in 1992 in the Luchsbach Valley with Europe’s biggest tin chamber.
- Likewise in the Luchsbach Valley is found the Erbstollen Morgenstern visitor mine. Already in the 17th century there was intensive tin and silver mining on the Hahnel. The Förderverein Luchsbachtal e. V. got the upper mine working “honorarily” once again with ABM (“Arbeitsbeschaffungsmaßnahmen” – make-work measures) forces brought to bear. The gallery reaches 190 m into the ground, of which 80 m is open to visitors. The temperature inside is 11-12 °C the year round.
- Bergbaulehrpfad (“Mining Lore Trail”) that goes to the old mining works as well as those run by SDAG Wismut (as of 1946)
- Manor houses belonging to the old hammereworks
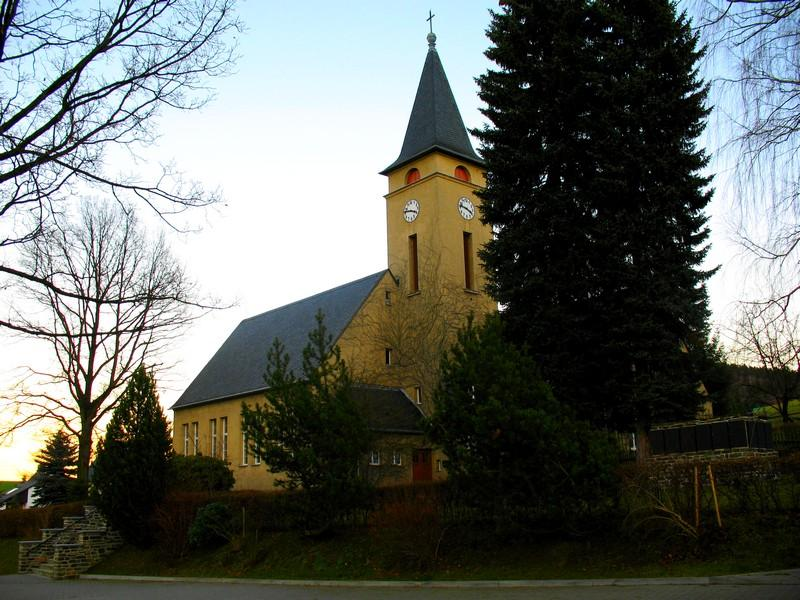
Evangelical Lutheran church: hall church built in 1933 with rectory built onto it

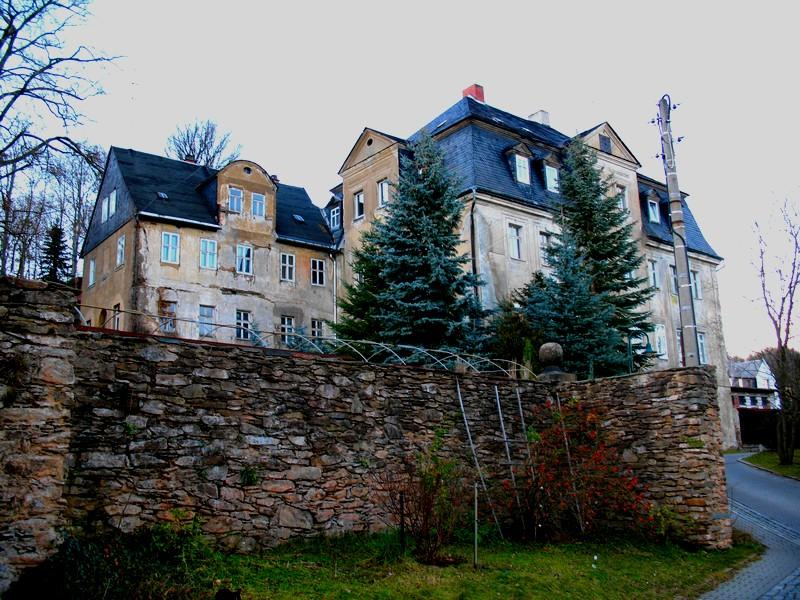
Pfeilhammer Manor House: rebuilt in 1802-1806 after a fire.

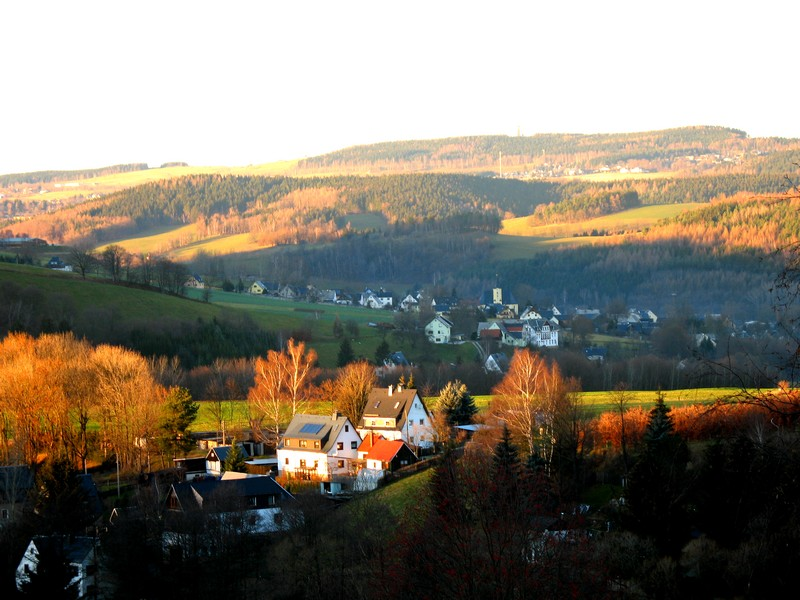
View from the waterworks over the lower constituent community. In the background the church of Grünstädtel. On the horizon the Spiegelwald (forest).

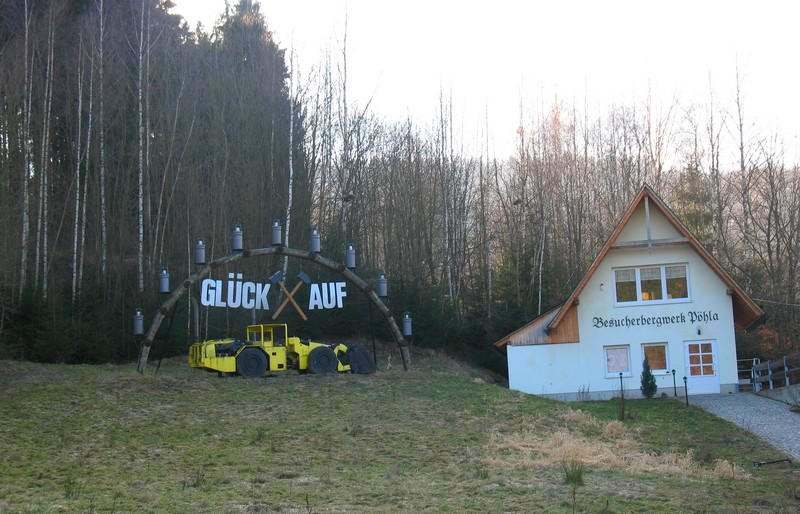
Pöhla visitor mine with Europe's biggest tin chambers.

== Famous people ==
- The poet of the song Dar Vugelbeerbaam Max Schreyer (1845–1922) was active here from 1893 to 1919 as chief forester.
- The ski jumper Jens Weißflog grew up here.
