= Nejc Dežman =

Slovenian ski jumper

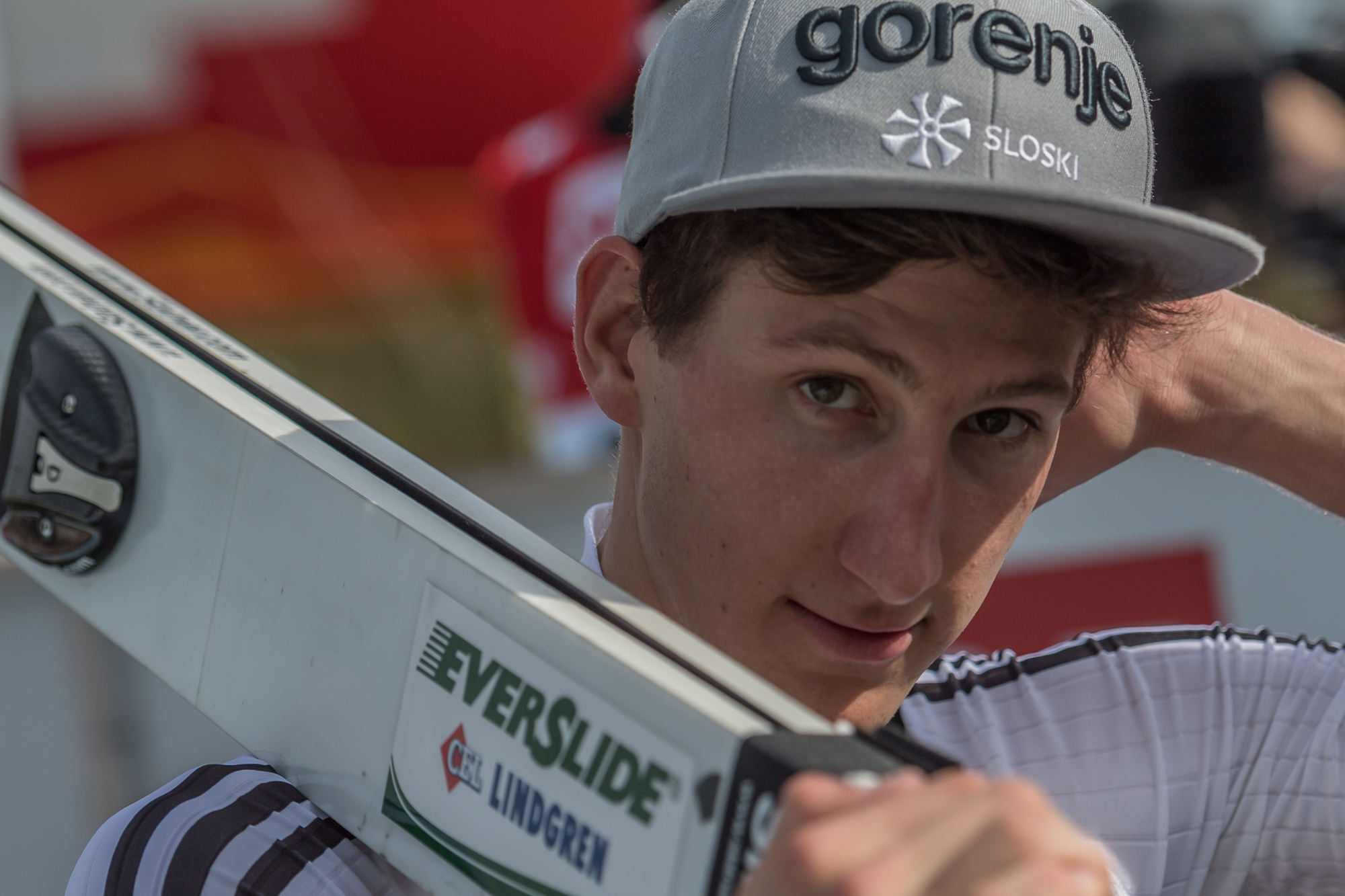

Personal information
- Full name: Nejc Dežman
- Born: 7 December 1992 (age 33) Kranj, Slovenia

Sport
- Sport: Skiing

World Cup career
- Seasons: 2012–2018
- Indiv. starts: 65
- Team starts: 8
- Team podiums: 2
- Team wins: 1

Achievements and titles
- Personal bests: 224 m (735 ft); Vikersund, 19 March 2017
Medal record
Men's ski jumping Junior World Championships
Gold medal – first place	2012 Erzurum	Individual NH

Nejc Dežman (born 7 December 1992) is a retired Slovenian ski jumper.

Dežman's first World Cup performance was in Kulm in 2012. He received a gold medal at the 2012 Junior World Championships in individual normal hill.
