= FIS Race (ski jumping) =

Ski jumping competition series

The FIS Race (ski jumping) is the oldest series of ski jumping competitions arranged yearly by the International Ski Federation. It is considered the fourth level of international ski jumping, ranking below the World Cup, Continental Cup and FIS Cup. Most of the events are held on normal hills and large hills, with a construction point of 90 meters. All top level and other international events before the World Cup was founded were part of FIS (race) competitions.

Higher competitive circuits are the World Cup, the Summer Grand Prix and the Continental Cup; the lower circuits include the FIS Cup and the Alpen Cup.

== History ==
International Ski Federation was founded in 1924 and in 1979 World Cup was introduced. Between this period of time FIS Race was the top level of international ski jumping competition, not counting Olympics and world championships. All these events listed down below were the top-level competitions of those times. Even competition such as Four Hills Tournament was part of FIS race before World Cup (1953–1979). When World Cup was introduced there were suddenly no FIS races anymore. There was a huge gap of this competition in 1980s. But they returned in 1990s but as a fourth level of competition with many annual events. But since 2006, when a new third level of competition FIS Cup was introduced, the number of events drastically fell. Nowadays only a few FIS races are annually organized.

== FIS Race events ==
- Four Hills Tournament (1953–1979)
- Kongsberg Cup & Trophy (1953–1976)
- Holmenkollen Ski Festival (1933–1979, 1990)
- International Ski Flying Week (1953–1962)
- KOP Ski Flying Week (1963–1980)
- Janez Polda Memorial (1965–1979)
- Grand Prix of Nations (1968–1976)
- Bohemia Tournament (1960–1979)
- Tatra Cup (1967–1979)
- Copper Peak Ski Flying (1970–1978)
- Thunder Bay International (1975–1979)
- Swiss Ski Jumping Tournament (1951–1979)
- Sapporo International (1959–1979)
- Czech-Marusarz Memorial (1953–1979)
- Norwegian Tournament
- Flubergrennet (1969–1979)
- 3 Countries Tournament (1968–1979)
- Friendship Tournament (1965–1979)
- Iron Mountain International (1965–1979)
- Garmisch Wintersportwoche (1937–1962)
- Murau International (1970–1979)
