= 2020–21 FIS Cup (ski jumping) =

16th FIS Cup season

FIS Cup 2020/21
Discipline	Men	Women
Overall	(Austria) Maximilian Ortner	(Slovenia) Jerneja Repinc Zupančič

Competition
Edition	16th	9th
Locations	11	6
Individual	21	12
Cancelled	7	4

The 2020/21 FIS Cup (ski jumping) was the 16th FIS Cup season in ski jumping for men and the 9th for women.

Other competitive circuits this season include the World Cup, Grand Prix, Continental Cup, FIS Race and Alpen Cup.

== Calendar ==
=== Men ===
#	Date	Place	Hill	Size	Winner	Second	Third	Yellow bib	R.
	12 September 2020	(South Korea) Pyeongchang	Alpensia Ski Jumping Centre HS109	NH	Cancelled				
	13 September 2020	(South Korea) Pyeongchang	Alpensia Ski Jumping Centre HS109	NH	Cancelled				
	3 October 2020	(Austria) Villach	Villacher Alpenarena HS98	NH	Cancelled				
	4 October 2020	(Austria) Villach	Villacher Alpenarena HS98	NH	Cancelled				
1	3 October 2020	(Romania) Râșnov	Trambulina Valea Cărbunării HS97	NH	(Ukraine) Yevhen Marusiak	(Romania) Nicolae Sorin Mitrofan	(Romania) Andrei Feldorean	(Ukraine) Yevhen Marusiak	
2	4 October 2020	(Romania) Râșnov	Trambulina Valea Cărbunării HS97	NH	(Ukraine) Vitaliy Kalinichenko	(Ukraine) Yevhen Marusiak	(Czech Republic) Bendetikt Holub	(Ukraine) Yevhen Marusiak	
3	12 December 2020	(Switzerland) Kandersteg	Nordic Arena HS106	NH	(Austria) Niklas Bachlinger	(Austria) Stefan Rainer	(Austria) Maximilian Ortner	(Ukraine) Yevhen Marusiak	
4	13 December 2020	(Switzerland) Kandersteg	Nordic Arena HS106	NH	(Austria) Niklas Bachlinger	(Austria) Stefan Rainer	(Austria) Daniel Tschofenig	(Austria) Niklas Bachlinger	
5	9 January 2021	(Poland) Zakopane	Wielka Krokiew HS140	LH	(Austria) Elias Medwed	(Austria) Stefan Huber	(Slovenia) Jernej Presečnik	(Austria) Niklas Bachlinger	
6	10 January 2021	(Poland) Zakopane	Wielka Krokiew HS140	LH	(Austria) Elias Medwed	(Austria) Ulrich Wohlgennant	(Slovenia) Jernej Presečnik	(Austria) Niklas Bachlinger	
7	19 January 2021	(Poland) Szczyrk	Skalite HS104	NH	(Germany) Richard Freitag	(Austria) Mika Schwann	(Poland) Jarosław Krzak	(Austria) Stefan Huber	
8	20 January 2021	(Poland) Szczyrk	Skalite HS104	NH	(Germany) Philipp Raimund	(Austria) Timon-Pascal Kahofer	(Germany) David Siegel	(Austria) Stefan Huber	
	23 January 2021	(Norway) Notodden	Tveitanbakken HS98	NH	Cancelled				
	24 January 2021	(Norway) Notodden	Tveitanbakken HS98	NH	Cancelled				
	27 January 2021	(China) Zhangjiakou	Snow Ruyi National Ski Jumping Centre HS106	NH	Cancelled				
9	6 February 2021	(Finland) Lahti	Salpausselkä HS100	NH	(Austria) Hannes Landerer	(Switzerland) Dominik Peter	(Austria) Maximilian Ortner	(Austria) Stefan Huber	
10	7 February 2021	(Finland) Lahti	Salpausselkä HS100	NH	(Switzerland) Dominik Peter	(Austria) Maximilian Ortner	(Slovenia) Žak Mogel	(Austria) Stefan Huber	
11	20 February 2021	(Austria) Villach	Villacher Alpenarena HS98	NH	(Austria) Maximilian Ortner	(Austria) Francisco Mörth	(Austria) Stefan Huber	(Austria) Stefan Huber	
12	21 February 2021	(Austria) Villach	Villacher Alpenarena HS98	NH	(Austria) Maximilian Ortner	(Austria) Francisco Mörth	(Austria) Mika Schwann	(Austria) Maximilian Ortner	
13	27 February 2021	(Germany) Oberhof	Kanzlersgrund HS100	NH	(Austria) Maximilian Ortner	(Germany) Philipp Raimund	(Austria) Francisco Mörth	(Austria) Maximilian Ortner	
14	28 February 2021	(Germany) Oberhof	Kanzlersgrund HS100	NH	(Austria) Francisco Mörth	(Austria) Maximilian Ortner	(Slovenia) Mark Hafnar	(Austria) Maximilian Ortner	

=== Women ===
#	Date	Place	Hill	Size	Winner	Second	Third	Yellow bib	R.
	3 October 2020	(Austria) Villach	Villacher Alpenarena HS98	NH	Cancelled				
	4 October 2020	(Austria) Villach	Villacher Alpenarena HS98	NH	Cancelled				
	3 October 2020	(Romania) Râșnov	Trambulina Valea Cărbunării HS97	NH	Cancelled				
	4 October 2020	(Romania) Râșnov	Trambulina Valea Cărbunării HS97	NH	Cancelled				
1	11 December 2020	(Switzerland) Kandersteg	Nordic Arena HS106	NH	(France) Julia Clair	(Italy) Lara Malsiner	(France) Joséphine Pagnier	(France) Julia Clair	
2	12 December 2020	(Switzerland) Kandersteg	Nordic Arena HS106	NH	(France) Joséphine Pagnier	(France) Julia Clair	(Italy) Lara Malsiner	(France) Julia Clair	
3	19 January 2021	(Poland) Szczyrk	Skalite HS104	NH	(Czech Republic) Karolína Indráčková	(Slovenia) Nika Vetrih	(Poland) Kamila Karpiel	(France) Julia Clair	
4	20 January 2021	(Poland) Szczyrk	Skalite HS104	NH	(Slovenia) Nika Vetrih	(Czech Republic) Klára Ulrichová	(Slovenia) Jerneja Repinc Zupančič	(France) Julia Clair (Slovenia) Nika Vetrih	
5	20 February 2021	(Austria) Villach	Villacher Alpenarena HS98	NH	(Slovenia) Tinkara Komar	(Germany) Lia Böhme	(Austria) Katharina Ellmauer	(France) Julia Clair (Slovenia) Nika Vetrih	
6	21 February 2021	(Austria) Villach	Villacher Alpenarena HS98	NH	(Czech Republic) Štěpánka Ptáčková	(Austria) Sahra Schuller	(Slovenia) Tinkara Komar	(Austria) Katharina Ellmauer	
7	27 February 2021	(Germany) Oberhof	Kanzlersgrund HS100	NH	(Slovenia) Jerneja Repinc Zupančič	(Slovenia) Nika Prevc	(Austria) Katharina Ellmauer	(Austria) Katharina Ellmauer	
8	28 February 2021	(Germany) Oberhof	Kanzlersgrund HS100	NH	(Slovenia) Jerneja Repinc Zupančič	(Austria) Vanessa Moharitsch	(Germany) Pauline Heßler	(Slovenia) Jerneja Repinc Zupančič	

== Overall standings ==
=== Men ===
Rank	after all 14 events	Points
1	(Austria) Maximilian Ortner	630
2	(Austria) Stefan Huber	488
3	(Austria) Francisco Mörth	387
4	(Austria) Clemens Aigner	371
5	(Austria) Mika Schwann	329

=== Women ===
Rank	after all 8 events	Points
1	(Slovenia) Jerneja Repinc Zupančič	305
2	(Austria) Katharina Ellmauer	287
3	(Slovenia) Nika Vetrih	240
4	(Slovenia) Tinkara Komar	206
5	(Slovenia) Nika Prevc	188
