= 2019–20 FIS Ski Jumping Continental Cup =

Ski-jumping competition series

Continental Cup 2019/20
Discipline	Men	Women
Summer	(Poland) Klemens Murańka	(Austria) Marita Kramer
Winter	(Austria) Clemens Leitner	(Russia) Ksenia Kablukova

Competition
Edition	18th (summer), 28th (winter)	12th (summer), 16th (winter)
Locations	8 (summer), 11 (winter)	4 (summer), 3 (winter)
Individual	16 (summer), 21 (winter)	7 (summer), 6 (winter)
Cancelled	9 (winter)	1 (summer)
Rescheduled	.	.

The 2019/20 FIS Ski Jumping Continental Cup is the 29th in a row (27th official) Continental Cup winter season in ski jumping for men and the 16th for ladies. This is also the 18th summer continental cup season for men and 12th for ladies.

Other competitive circuits this season include the World Cup, Grand Prix, FIS Cup, FIS Race and Alpen Cup.

== Map of continental cup hosts ==
All 23 locations hosting continental cup events in summer (8 for men / 4 for ladies) and in winter (15 for men / 3 for ladies) this season.

2019–20 FIS Ski Jumping Continental Cup (Europe)	2019–20 FIS Ski Jumping Continental Cup (Asia) 2019–20 FIS Ski Jumping Continental Cup (North America)

Men Ladies Men & Ladies

== Men's Individual ==
Individual men's events in the Continental Cup history

Total	F	L	N	Winners	Competition
213	—	116	97		Summer
933	4	523	406		Winter

after large hill event in Lahti (8 March 2020)

=== Summer ===
Num	Season	Date	Place	Hill	Size	Winner	Second	Third	Yellow bib	Ref.
198	1	5 July 2018	(Slovenia) Kranj	Bauhenk HS109	N _{092}	(Russia) Evgeniy Klimov (Slovenia) Timi Zajc		(Germany) Pius Paschke	(Russia) Evgeniy Klimov (Slovenia) Timi Zajc	
199	2	6 July 2019	(Slovenia) Kranj	Bauhenk HS109	NH	(Russia) Evgeniy Klimov	(Slovenia) Timi Zajc	(Germany) Pius Paschke	(Russia) Evgeniy Klimov	
200	3	13 July 2019	(Kazakhstan) Shchuchinsk	Lyzhnyy Tramplin Burabay HS140	L _{107}	(Austria) Maximilian Lienher	(Japan) Naoki Nakamura	(Kazakhstan) Sergey Tkachenko	(Russia) Evgeniy Klimov	
201	4	14 July 2019	(Kazakhstan) Shchuchinsk	Lyzhnyy Tramplin Burabay HS140	LH	(Japan) Keiichi Satō	(Japan) Naoki Nakamura	(South Korea) Choi Heung-chul	(Japan) Keiichi Satō	
202	5	10 August 2019	(Poland) Wisła	Malinka HS134	LH	(Poland) Klemens Murańka	(Poland) Andrzej Stękała	(Germany) Philipp Raimund	(Japan) Keiichi Satō	
203	6	11 August 2019	(Poland) Wisła	Malinka HS134	LH	(Poland) Klemens Murańka	(Germany) Moritz Baer	(Poland) Paweł Wąsek	(Japan) Keiichi Satō	
204	7	16 August 2019	(Czech Republic) Frenštát pod Radhoštěm	Areal Horečky HS106	NH	(Norway) Joakim Aune	(Slovenia) Rok Justin	(Poland) Klemens Murańka	(Poland) Klemens Murańka	
205	8	17 August 2019	(Czech Republic) Frenštát pod Radhoštěm	Areal Horečky HS106	NH	(Poland) Paweł Wąsek	(Slovenia) Rok Justin	(Norway) Joakim Aune	(Poland) Klemens Murańka	
206	9	31 August 2019	(Romania) Râșnov	Trambulina Valea Cărbunării HS97	NH	(Slovenia) Rok Justin	(Austria) Markus Schiffner	(Poland) Stefan Hula	(Poland) Klemens Murańka	
207	10	1 September 2019	(Romania) Râșnov	Trambulina Valea Cărbunării HS97	N _{097}	(Slovenia) Rok Justin	(Norway) Andreas Granerud Buskum	(Norway) Joakim Aune	(Slovenia) Rok Justin	
208	11	14 September 2019	(Norway) Lillehammer	Lysgårdsbakken HS140	LH	(Poland) Klemens Murańka	(Germany) Philipp Raimund	(Slovenia) Rok Justin	(Slovenia) Rok Justin	
209	12	15 September 2019	(Norway) Lillehammer	Lysgårdsbakken HS140	LH	(Switzerland) Simon Ammann	(Germany) Pius Paschke	(Austria) Clemens Leitner	(Slovenia) Rok Justin	
210	13	21 September 2019	(Austria) Stams	Brunnentalschanze HS115	LH	(Japan) Taku Takeuchi	(Germany) Pius Paschke	(Poland) Stefan Hula	(Slovenia) Rok Justin	
211	14	22 September 2019	(Austria) Stams	Brunnentalschanze HS115	LH	(Japan) Taku Takeuchi	(Poland) Klemens Murańka	(Germany) Pius Paschke	(Slovenia) Rok Justin	
212	15	28 September 2019	(Germany) Klingenthal	Vogtland Arena HS140	LH	(Slovenia) Domen Prevc	(Poland) Klemens Murańka	(Canada) Mackenzie Boyd-Clowes	(Poland) Klemens Murańka	
213	16	29 September 2019	(Germany) Klingenthal	Vogtland Arena HS140	L _{116}	(Slovenia) Domen Prevc	(Poland) Klemens Murańka	(Canada) Mackenzie Boyd-Clowes	(Poland) Klemens Murańka	

=== Winter ===
Num	Season	Date	Place	Hill	Size	Winner	Second	Third	Yellow bib	Ref.
913	1	7 December 2019	(Norway) Vikersund	Vikersundbakken HS117	L _{505}	(Japan) Taku Takeuchi	(Japan) Keiichi Satō	(Austria) Clemens Aigner	(Japan) Taku Takeuchi	
914	2	8 December 2019	(Norway) Vikersund	Vikersundbakken HS117	LH	(Norway) Anders Håre	(Norway) Sondre Ringen	(Japan) Yūken Iwasa	(Japan) Taku Takeuchi	
915	3	14 December 2019	(Finland) Ruka	Rukatunturi HS142	LH	(Japan) Keiichi Satō	(Japan) Taku Takeuchi	(Austria) Clemens Leitner	(Japan) Taku Takeuchi	
916	4	15 December 2019	(Finland) Ruka	Rukatunturi HS142	LH	(Japan) Taku Takeuchi	(Austria) Clemens Leitner	(Japan) Keiichi Satō	(Japan) Taku Takeuchi	
		27 December 2019	(Switzerland) Engelberg	Gross-Titlis-Schanze HS140	LH	weather conditions				
		28 December 2019	(Switzerland) Engelberg	Gross-Titlis-Schanze HS140	LH	weather conditions				
		3 January 2020	(Germany) Titisee-Neustadt	Hochfirstschanze HS142	LH	weather conditions				
		4 January 2020	(Germany) Titisee-Neustadt	Hochfirstschanze HS142	LH	weather conditions				
917	5	11 January 2020	(Austria) Bischofshofen	Paul-Ausserleitner-Schanze HS142	LH	(Austria) Clemens Leitner	(Austria) Stefan Huber	(Austria) Clemens Aigner	(Japan) Taku Takeuchi	
918	6	12 January 2020	(Austria) Bischofshofen	Paul-Ausserleitner-Schanze HS142	LH	(Austria) Clemens Aigner	(Austria) Clemens Leitner	(Austria) Stefan Huber	(Austria) Clemens Leitner	
919	7	18 January 2020	(Germany) Klingenthal	Vogtland Arena HS140	LH	(Austria) Stefan Huber	(Slovenia) Žiga Jelar	(Norway) Robin Pedersen	(Austria) Clemens Leitner	
920	8	19 January 2020	(Germany) Klingenthal	Vogtland Arena HS140	LH	(Norway) Robin Pedersen	(Austria) Clemens Aigner	(Austria) Stefan Huber	(Austria) Clemens Leitner	
921	9	25 January 2020	(Japan) Sapporo	Okurayama HS137	LH	(Austria) Clemens Leitner	(Poland) Klemens Murańka	(Japan) Taku Takeuchi	(Austria) Clemens Leitner	
922	10	26 January 2020	(Japan) Sapporo	Okurayama HS137	LH	(Poland) Klemens Murańka	(Norway) Anders Håre	(Japan) Hiroaki Watanabe	(Austria) Clemens Leitner	
923	11	1 February 2020	(Slovenia) Planica	Bloudkova velikanka HS138	LH	(Austria) Stefan Huber	(Slovenia) Anže Semenič	(Slovenia) Žiga Jelar	(Austria) Clemens Leitner	
924	12	2 February 2020	(Slovenia) Planica	Bloudkova velikanka HS138	LH	(Slovenia) Anže Semenič	(Slovenia) Žiga Jelar	(Norway) Anders Håre	(Austria) Clemens Leitner	
925	13	8 February 2020	(Germany) Brotterode	Inselbergschanze HS117	LH	(Slovenia) Rok Justin	(Austria) Ulrich Wohlgenannt	(Norway) Andreas Granerud Buskum	(Austria) Clemens Leitner	
926	14	9 February 2020	(Germany) Brotterode	Inselbergschanze HS117	LH	(Norway) Joacim Ødegård Bjøreng	(Poland) Paweł Wąsek	(Poland) Stefan Hula	(Austria) Clemens Leitner	
927	15	15 February 2020	(United States) Iron Mountain	Pine Mountain Ski Jump HS133	LH	(Austria) Clemens Aigner	(Poland) Paweł Wąsek	(Austria) Markus Schiffner	(Austria) Clemens Leitner	
928	16	16 February 2020	(United States) Iron Mountain	Pine Mountain Ski Jump HS133	LH	(Austria) Clemens Aigner	(Austria) Markus Schiffner	(Slovenia) Lovro Kos	(Austria) Clemens Aigner	
929	17	22 February 2020	(Italy) Val di Fiemme	Trampolino dal Ben HS106	N _{405}	(Poland) Maciej Kot	(Austria) Clemens Aigner	(Germany) Moritz Baer	(Austria) Clemens Aigner	
930	18	23 February 2020	(Italy) Val di Fiemme	Trampolino dal Ben HS106	N _{406}	(Poland) Maciej Kot	(Austria) Clemens Aigner	(Slovenia) Mark Hafnar	(Austria) Clemens Aigner	
931	19	29 February 2020	(Norway) Rena	Renabakkene HS139	LH	(Austria) Clemens Leitner	(Germany) Martin Hamann	(Austria) Clemens Aigner	(Austria) Clemens Aigner	
		1 March 2020	(Norway) Rena	Renabakkene HS139	LH	weather conditions				
932	20	7 March 2020	(Finland) Lahti	Salpausselkä HS130	LH	(Austria) Clemens Leitner	(Slovenia) Lovro Kos	(Slovenia) Bor Pavlovčič	(Austria) Clemens Leitner	
933	21	8 March 2020	(Finland) Lahti	Salpausselkä HS130	L _{523}	(Austria) Clemens Leitner	(Slovenia) Lovro Kos	(Poland) Paweł Wąsek	(Austria) Clemens Leitner	
		14 March 2020	(Poland) Zakopane	Wielka Krokiew HS140	LH	coronavirus pandemic				
		15 March 2020	(Poland) Zakopane	Wielka Krokiew HS140	LH	coronavirus pandemic				
		21 March 2020	(Russia) Chaykovsky	Snezhinka HS102	NH	coronavirus pandemic				
		22 March 2020	(Russia) Chaykovsky	Snezhinka HS140	LH	coronavirus pandemic				

== Women's Individual ==
Individual women's events in the Continental Cup history

Total	L	N	M	Winners	Competition
62	2	49	11		Summer
166	17	134	15		Winter

after large hill event in Brotterode (9 February 2020)

=== Summer ===
Num	Season	Date	Place	Hill	Size	Winner	Second	Third	Yellow bib	Ref.
56	1	13 July 2019	(Kazakhstan) Shchuchinsk	Lyzhnyy Tramplin Burabay HS99	N _{045}	(Norway) Gyda Westvold Hansen	(Kazakhstan) Veronika Shishkina	(Kazakhstan) Valentina Sderzhikova	(Norway) Gyda Westvold Hansen	
57	2	14 July 2019	(Kazakhstan) Shchuchinsk	Lyzhnyy Tramplin Burabay HS99	NH	(Norway) Gyda Westvold Hansen	(Russia) Kristina Prokopieva	(Kazakhstan) Valentina Sderzhikova	(Norway) Gyda Westvold Hansen	
58	3	8 August 2019	(Poland) Szczyrk	Skalite HS104	NH	(Austria) Marita Kramer	(Austria) Claudia Purker	(Poland) Kinga Rajda	(Norway) Gyda Westvold Hansen	
59	4	9 August 2019	(Poland) Szczyrk	Skalite HS104	NH	(Austria) Marita Kramer	(Japan) Misaki Shigeno	(Poland) Kinga Rajda	(Norway) Gyda Westvold Hansen (Austria) Marita Kramer	
60	5	14 September 2019	(Norway) Lillehammer	Lysgårdsbakken HS98	N _{049}	(Japan) Sara Takanashi	(Japan) Yūki Itō	(Japan) Nozomi Maruyama	(Norway) Gyda Westvold Hansen	
		15 September 2019	(Norway) Lillehammer	Lysgårdsbakken HS98	NH	strong wind				
61	6	21 September 2019	(Austria) Stams	Brunnentalschanze HS115	L _{001}	(Austria) Eva Pinkelnig	(Austria) Marita Kramer	(Slovenia) Urša Bogataj	(Austria) Marita Kramer	
62	7	22 September 2019	(Austria) Stams	Brunnentalschanze HS115	L _{002}	(Slovenia) Ema Klinec	(Austria) Marita Kramer	(Slovenia) Urša Bogataj	(Austria) Marita Kramer	

=== Winter ===
Num	Season	Date	Place	Hill	Size	Winner	Second	Third	Yellow bib	Ref.
161	1	13 December 2019	(Norway) Notodden	Tveitanbakken HS100	N _{133}	(Italy) Jessica Malsiner	(Russia) Kristina Prokopieva (Austria) Sophie Sorschag		(Italy) Jessica Malsiner	
162	2	14 December 2019	(Norway) Notodden	Tveitanbakken HS100	N _{134}	(Austria) Sophie Sorschag	(Norway) Thea Minyan Bjørseth	(Austria) Julia Mühlbacher	(Austria) Sophie Sorschag	
163	3	25 January 2020	(Norway) Rena	Renabakkene HS111	L _{014}	(Russia) Ksenia Kabłukova	(Germany) Pia Lilian Kübler	(Germany) Pauline Heßler	(Austria) Sophie Sorschag	
164	4	26 January 2020	(Norway) Rena	Renabakkene HS111	LH	(Austria) Sophie Sorschag	(Russia) Irma Makhinia	(Russia) Ksenia Kabłukova	(Austria) Sophie Sorschag	
165	5	8 February 2020	(Germany) Brotterode	Inselbergschanze HS117	LH	(Germany) Pauline Hessler	(Russia) Ksenia Kabłukova	(Slovenia) Jerneja Repinc Zupančič	(Austria) Sophie Sorschag	
166	6	9 February 2020	(Germany) Brotterode	Inselbergschanze HS117	L _{017}	(Russia) Ksenia Kabłukova	(Germany) Pauline Hessler	(Germany) Pia Lilian Kübler	(Russia) Ksenia Kabłukova	

== Men's standings ==
=== Summer ===
Rank	after 16 events	Points
1	(Poland) Klemens Murańka	724
2	(Slovenia) Rok Justin	599
3	(Germany) Pius Paschke	556
4	(Germany) Moritz Baer	390
5	(Austria) Clemens Leitner	342

=== Winter ===
Rank	after 21 events	Points
1	(Austria) Clemens Leitner	1085
2	(Austria) Clemens Aigner	931
3	(Japan) Taku Takeuchi	563
4	(Germany) Martin Hamann	559
5	(Austria) Stefan Huber	532

== Ladies' standings ==
=== Summer ===
Rank	after 7 events	Points
1	(Austria) Marita Kramer	360
2	(Norway) Gyda Westvold Hansen	222
3	(Czech Republic) Karolína Indráčková	194
4	(Austria) Claudia Purker	159
5	(Austria) Eva Pinkelnig	150

=== Winter ===
Rank	after 6 events	Points
1	(Russia) Ksenia Kablukova	385
2	(Austria) Sophie Sorschag	320
3	(Germany) Pauline Hessler	285
4	(Germany) Pia Lilian Kübler	264
5	(Russia) Irma Makhinia	235

== Europa Cup vs. Continental Cup ==
Last two seasons of Europa Cup in 1991/92 and 1992/93 are recognized as first two Continental Cup seasons by International Ski Federation, although Continental Cup under this name officially started first season in 1993/94 season.
