= 2023–24 FIS Ski Jumping Continental Cup =

Ski-jumping competition series

Winners
- Summer: (Germany) Pius Paschke
- Nations Cup Summer: Austria
- Winter: (Austria) Maximilian Ortner
- Nations Cup Winter: Austria

Competitions
- Venues: 4 (summer), 12 (winter)
- Individual: 9 (summer), 27 (winter)
- Cancelled: 1

The 2023–24 FIS Ski Jumping Continental Cup, organized by the International Ski Federation (FIS) was the 33rd (30th official) (Note: Last two seasons of Europa Cup in 1991/92 and 1992/93 are recognized as first two Continental Cup seasons by International Ski Federation, although Continental Cup under this name officially started first season in 1993/94 season.) Continental Cup winter season and the 22nd Summer Continental Cup season in ski jumping for men.

The season started on 9 September 2023 in Oslo, Norway and concluded on 17 March 2024 in Zakopane, Poland.

Other competitive circuits this season included the World Cup, Grand Prix, Inter-Continental Cup, FIS Cup, Alpen Cup and New Star Trophy.

From this season, the women's Continental Cup has ended, which has been running continuously since the 2004–05 season. They are now merged with the FIS Cup and created as the new competition Inter-Continental Cup.

For the first time in the history of Continental Cup, the winter competition in Zakopane was held in hybrid conditions – the inrun track was covered with ice, while the landing hill was entirely covered with plastic mattings.

== Map of Continental Cup hosts ==
All 16 locations hosting Continental Cup events (4 summer / 12 winter) in this season.

Europe	Asia 2023–24 FIS Ski Jumping Continental Cup (Asia) North America 2023–24 FIS Ski Jumping Continental Cup (North America)

Summer Winter

== Men's Individual ==
Individual men's events in the Continental Cup history

Total	F	L	N	Winners	Competition
245	—	139	106		Summer
1030	4	618	408		Winter

after large hill event in Zakopane (17 March 2024)

=== Summer ===
N – normal hill / L – large hill
All	#	Date	Place (Hill)	Size	Winner	Second	Third	Overall	R.
237	1	9 September 2023	(Norway) Oslo (Midtstubakken HS106)	N _{105}	(Norway) Robert Johansson	(Austria) Maximilian Steiner	(Austria) Clemens Leitner	(Norway) Robert Johansson	
238	2	10 September 2023	(Norway) Oslo (Midtstubakken HS106)	N _{106}	(Norway) Robert Johansson	(Japan) Tomofumi Naitō	(Estonia) Artti Aigro	(Norway) Robert Johansson	
239	3	16 September 2023	(Austria) Stams (Brunnentalschanze HS115)	L _{133}	(Austria) Marco Wörgötter	(Austria) Clemens Aigner	(Austria) Jonas Schuster	(Norway) Robert Johansson	
240	4	17 September 2023	(Austria) Stams (Brunnentalschanze HS115)	L _{134}	(Austria) Clemens Leitner	(Austria) Jonas Schuster	(Austria) Marco Wörgötter	(Austria) Clemens Leitner	
241	5	23 September 2023	(Germany) Klingenthal (Vogtland Arena HS140)	L _{135}	(Slovenia) Domen Prevc	(Austria) Clemens Leitner	(Germany) Pius Paschke	(Austria) Clemens Leitner	
242	6	24 September 2023	(Germany) Klingenthal (Vogtland Arena HS140)	L _{136}	(Slovenia) Lovro Kos	(Norway) Benjamin Østvold	(Germany) Pius Paschke	(Austria) Clemens Leitner	
243	7	6 October 2023	(United States) Lake Placid (MacKenzie Intervale HS128)	L _{137}	(Germany) Pius Paschke	(Poland) Maciej Kot	(Austria) Clemens Aigner	(Austria) Clemens Leitner	
244	8	(Note: One round only due to strong wind.)7 October 2023	(United States) Lake Placid (MacKenzie Intervale HS128)	L _{138}	(Norway) Fredrik Villumstad	(Germany) Stephan Leyhe (Germany) Pius Paschke		(Germany) Pius Paschke	
245	9	7 October 2023	(United States) Lake Placid (MacKenzie Intervale HS128)	L _{139}	(Austria) Clemens Aigner	(Austria) Maximilian Steiner	(Germany) Stephan Leyhe	(Germany) Pius Paschke	

==== Overall (Summer) ====
Rank	after all 9 events	Points
	(Germany) Pius Paschke	466
2	(Austria) Clemens Leitner	442
3	(Austria) Maximilian Steiner	398
4	(Norway) Fredrik Villumstad	388
5	(Germany) Stephan Leyhe	387
6	(Austria) Clemens Aigner	379
7	(Poland) Maciej Kot	294
8	(Austria) Jonas Schuster	292
9	(Norway) Benjamin Østvold	261
10	(Austria) Marco Wörgötter	258

==== Nations Cup (Summer) ====
Rank	after all 9 events	Points
1	Austria	2230
2	Norway	1278
3	Germany	1158
4	Slovenia	676
5	Poland	543
6	United States	249
7	Japan	135
8	Estonia	66
9	Ukraine	38
10	Finland; Italy	32

=== Winter ===
N – normal hill / L – large hill
All	#	Date	Place (Hill)	Size	Winner	Second	Third	Overall	R.
1004	1	9 December 2023	(Norway) Lillehammer (Lysgårdsbakken HS140)	L _{592}	(Germany) Luca Roth	(Poland) Aleksander Zniszczoł	(Austria) Clemens Aigner	(Germany) Luca Roth	
1005	2	10 December 2023	(Norway) Lillehammer (Lysgårdsbakken HS140)	L _{593}	(Austria) Clemens Aigner	(Austria) Clemens Leitner	(Slovenia) Žak Mogel	(Austria) Clemens Aigner	
1006	3	(Note: Rescheduled from 16 December 2023)15 December 2023	(Finland) Ruka (Rukatunturi HS142)	L _{594}	(Norway) Benjamin Østvold	(Poland) Aleksander Zniszczoł	(Austria) Stephan Embacher	(Poland) Aleksander Zniszczoł	
1007	4	(Note: Rescheduled from 17 December 2023)16 December 2023	(Finland) Ruka (Rukatunturi HS142)	L _{595}	(Austria) Clemens Leitner	(Norway) Robin Pedersen	(Austria) Clemens Aigner	(Austria) Clemens Aigner	
1008	5	27 December 2023	(Switzerland) Engelberg (Gross-Titlis HS140)	L _{596}	(Norway) Anders Håre	(Austria) Stephan Embacher	(Germany) Martin Hamann	(Austria) Clemens Leitner	
1009	6	28 December 2023	(Switzerland) Engelberg (Gross-Titlis HS140)	L _{597}	(Austria) Stephan Embacher	(Germany) Constantin Schmid	(Norway) S. Ulven Jørgensen	(Austria) Clemens Leitner	
1010	7	6 January 2024	(Germany) Garmisch-Pa (Olympiaschanze HS142)	L _{598}	(Germany) Constantin Schmid	(Norway) S. Ulven Jørgensen	(Poland) Klemens Murańka	(Germany) Constantin Schmid	
1011	8	(Note: Rescheduled from 7 January 2024.)6 January 2024	(Germany) Garmisch-Pa (Olympiaschanze HS142)	L _{599}	(Norway) Robin Pedersen	(Slovenia) Žak Mogel	(Germany) Constantin Schmid	(Germany) Constantin Schmid	
1012	9	13 January 2024	(Austria) Innsbruck (Bergiselschanze HS128)	L _{600}	(Norway) Robin Pedersen	(Austria) Jonas Schuster	(Austria) Clemens Leitner	(Norway) Robin Pedersen	
1013	10	14 January 2024	(Austria) Innsbruck (Bergiselschanze HS128)	L _{601}	(Norway) Robin Pedersen	(Slovenia) Maksim Bartolj	(Austria) Daniel Huber	(Norway) Robin Pedersen	
1014	11	20 January 2024	(Japan) Sapporo (Ōkurayama HS137)	L _{602}	(Austria) Francisco Mörth	(Austria) Daniel Huber	(Austria) Jonas Schuster	(Norway) Robin Pedersen	
1015	12	21 January 2024	(Japan) Sapporo (Ōkurayama HS137)	L _{603}	(Norway) Robin Pedersen	(Austria) Francisco Mörth	(Austria) Daniel Huber	(Norway) Robin Pedersen	
1016	13	21 January 2024	(Japan) Sapporo (Ōkurayama HS137)	L _{604}	(Germany) Felix Hoffmann	(Norway) Robin Pedersen	(Austria) Daniel Huber	(Norway) Robin Pedersen	
1017	14	27 January 2024	(Germany) Willingen (Mühlenkopf HS147)	L _{605}	(Austria) Daniel Huber	(Germany) Felix Hoffmann	(Austria) Maximilian Ortner	(Norway) Robin Pedersen	
1018	15	28 January 2024	(Germany) Willingen (Mühlenkopf HS147)	L _{606}	(Norway) Benjamin Østvold	(Austria) Daniel Huber	(Austria) Jonas Schuster	(Norway) Robin Pedersen	
1019	16	(Note: Rescheduled from 3 February 2024.)4 February 2024	(Norway) Lillehammer (Lysgårdsbakken HS140) (Note: Competition moved from Rena)	L _{607}	(Poland) Maciej Kot	(Norway) Fredrik Villumstad	(Slovenia) Maksim Bartolj	(Norway) Robin Pedersen	
1020	17	4 February 2024	(Norway) Lillehammer (Lysgårdsbakken HS140)	L _{608}	(Austria) Maximilian Ortner	(Austria) Jonas Schuster	(Poland) Jakub Wolny	(Norway) Robin Pedersen	
1021	18	17 February 2024	(Germany) Brotterode (Inselbergschanze HS117)	L _{609}	(Norway) Pål-Håkon Bjørtomt	(Norway) Fredrik Villumstad	(Germany) Luca Roth	(Norway) Robin Pedersen	
1022	19	18 February 2024	(Germany) Brotterode (Inselbergschanze HS117)	L _{610}	(Austria) Maximilian Ortner	(Austria) Jonas Schuster	(Germany) Constantin Schmid	(Norway) Robin Pedersen	
1023	20	(Note: Rescheduled from 23 February 2024.)24 February 2024	(United States) Iron Mountain (Pine Mountain Ski Jump HS133)	L _{611}	(Austria) Jonas Schuster	(Austria) Francisco Mörth	(Germany) Markus Eisenbichler	(Austria) Jonas Schuster	
1024	21	24 February 2024	(United States) Iron Mountain (Pine Mountain Ski Jump HS133)	L _{612}	(Germany) Markus Eisenbichler	(Norway) Anders Håre	(Germany) Ben Bayer	(Austria) Jonas Schuster	
		25 February 2024	(United States) Iron Mountain (Pine Mountain Ski Jump HS133)	L _{cnx}	cancelled due to strong wind			—	
1025	22	(Note: Competition moved from Kranj)2 March 2024	(Slovenia) Planica (Bloudkova velikanka HS138)	L _{613}	(Austria) Clemens Aigner	(Austria) Jonas Schuster	(Austria) Hannes Landerer	(Austria) Jonas Schuster	
1026	23	3 March 2024	(Slovenia) Planica (Bloudkova velikanka HS138)	L _{614}	(Austria) Clemens Aigner	(Austria) Maximilian Ortner	(Austria) Jonas Schuster	(Austria) Jonas Schuster	
1027	24	9 March 2024	(Finland) Lahti (Salpausselkä HS130)	L _{615}	(Slovenia) Žak Mogel	(Germany) Markus Eisenbichler	(Austria) Maximilian Ortner	(Austria) Jonas Schuster	
1028	25	10 March 2024	(Finland) Lahti (Salpausselkä HS130)	L _{616}	(Germany) Markus Eisenbichler	(Austria) Maximilian Ortner	(Austria) Stephan Embacher	(Austria) Jonas Schuster	
1029	26	16 March 2024	(Poland) Zakopane (Wielka Krokiew HS140)	L _{617}	(Austria) Clemens Aigner	(Austria) Maximilian Ortner	(Germany) Markus Eisenbichler	(Austria) Maximilian Ortner	
1030	27	17 March 2024	(Poland) Zakopane (Wielka Krokiew HS140)	L _{618}	(Poland) Paweł Wąsek	(Austria) Clemens Aigner	(Slovenia) Žak Mogel	(Austria) Maximilian Ortner	
33rd FIS Continental Cup Overall (9 December 2023 – 17 March 2024)					(Austria) Maximilian Ortner	(Austria) Jonas Schuster	(Austria) Francisco Mörth	Winter Overall	

==== Overall (Winter) ====
Rank	after all 27 events	Points
	(Austria) Maximilian Ortner	1243
2	(Austria) Jonas Schuster	1195
3	(Austria) Francisco Mörth	806
4	(Norway) Robin Pedersen	800
5	(Austria) Clemens Leitner	787
6	(Slovenia) Maksim Bartolj	783
7	(Slovenia) Žak Mogel	741
8	(Austria) Clemens Aigner	709
9	(Germany) Constantin Schmid	649
10	(Germany) Felix Hoffmann	641

==== Nations Cup (Winter) ====
Rank	after all 27 events	Points
1	Austria	6790
2	Norway	3726
3	Germany	3541
4	Slovenia	2373
5	Poland	1679
6	Japan	407
7	Switzerland	245
8	France	200
9	Kazakhstan	167
10	United States	101

== Podium table by nation ==
Table showing the Continental Cup podium places (gold–1st place, silver–2nd place, bronze–3rd place) by the countries represented by the athletes.

Rank	Nation	Gold	Silver	Bronze	Total
1	Austria	14	19	18	51
2	Norway	11	7	1	19
3	Germany	6	5	10	21
4	Slovenia	3	2	3	8
5	Poland	2	3	2	7
6	Japan	0	1	0	1
7	Estonia	0	0	1	1
Totals (7 entries)		36	37	35	108
