= 2023 FIS Ski Jumping Grand Prix =

Ski Jumping Grand Prix

Discipline	Men	Women
Overall	(Bulgaria) Vladimir Zografski	(Slovenia) Nika Križnar
Nations Cup	Austria	Slovenia

Competition
Edition	30th	12th
Locations	5	4
Individual	9	7
Mixed	1	1
Cancelled	2	2

Overall champions

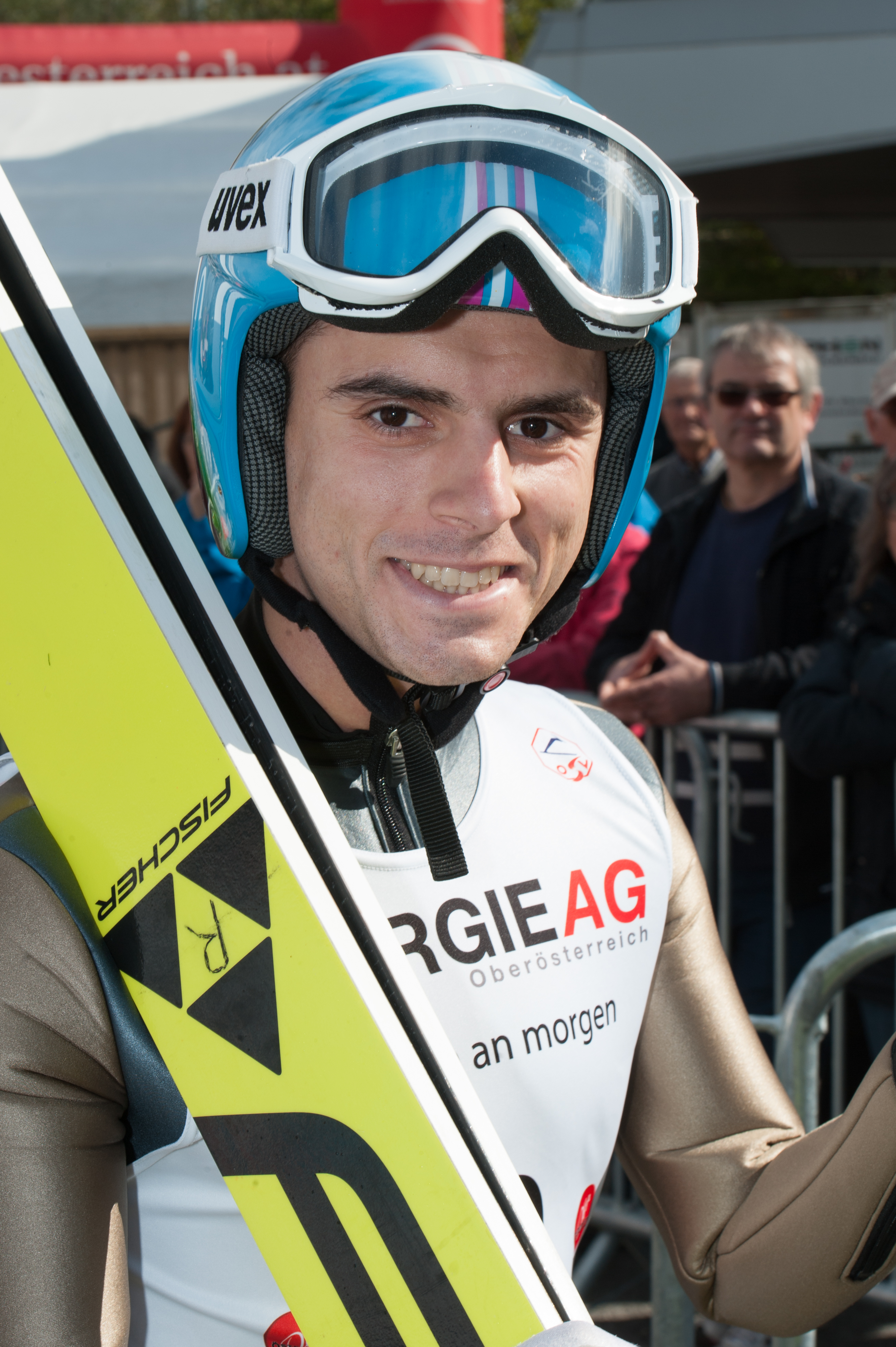
Vladimir Zografski wins the trophy and became the first ever Bulgarian athlete to top the overall standing at the highest level of ski jumping.

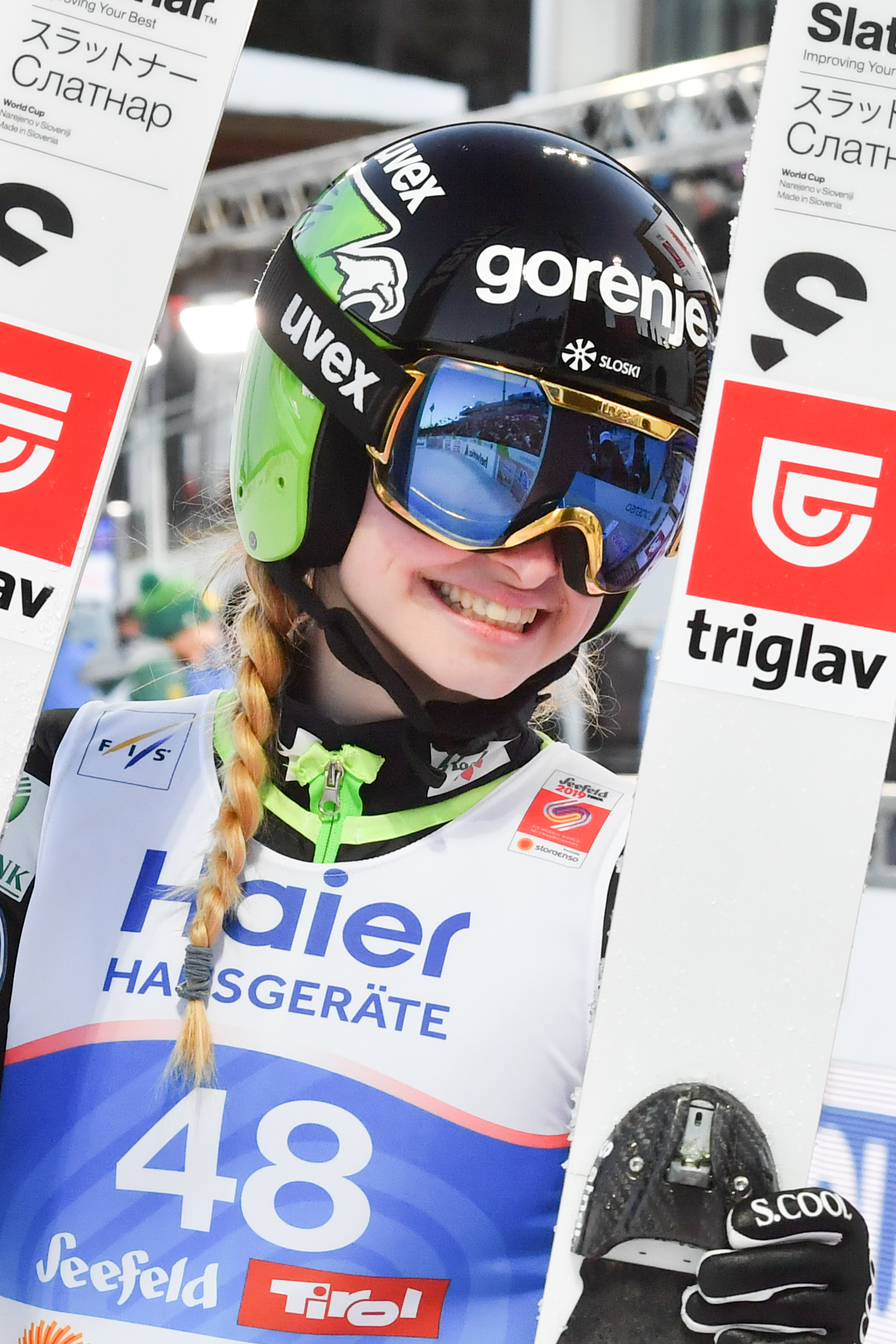
Nika Križnar won her first overall Grand Prix title in her career.

The 2023 FIS Ski Jumping Grand Prix was the 30th Summer Grand Prix season in ski jumping for men and the 12th for women.

Gregor Deschwanden and Vladimir Zografski won their first Grand Prix competitions in their career.

For the first time ever there was the same podium in the first three Women's Grand Prix competitions (1st–Križnar, 2nd–Takanashi, 3rd Loutitt).

As of the victory in Szczyrk, Piotr Żyła became the third oldest Grand Prix winner competition in history (after Noriaki Kasai and Michael Neumayer).

Taking third place in the competition in Râșnov, Fatih Arda İpcioğlu won the first podium of the highest-ranking competition in the history of Turkish ski jumping.

== Map of Grand Prix hosts ==
All 5 locations hosting world cup events for men (5), for women (4) and shared (4) in this season.

(France) Courchevel	(Poland) Szczyrk	(Romania) Râșnov	(Austria) Hinzenbach	(Germany) Klingenthal
Tremplin du Praz	Skalite	Trambulină Valea Cărbunării	Aigner-Schanze	Vogtland Arena
Europe

Shared (Men and Women) Men Only

== Men ==
Grand Prix history in real time

Total	LH	NH	Winners
228	172	56	79

after LH event in Klingenthal (7 October 2023)

=== Calendar ===
NH – normal hill / LH – large hill
All	#	Date	Place (Hill)	Event	Winner	Second	Third	Yellow bib	R.
2023 European Games • (Poland) Kraków-Małopolska (29 June–1 July)
		28 July 2023	(Germany) Hinterzarten (Adler Ski Stadium HS111)	LH _{cnx}	cancelled due to financial problems				
		29 July 2023	(Germany) Hinterzarten (Adler Ski Stadium HS111)	LH _{cnx}	cancelled due to financial problems				
220	1	29 July 2023	(France) Courchevel (Tremplin du Praz HS132)	LH _{170}	(Switzerland) Gregor Deschwanden	(Bulgaria) Vladimir Zografski	(Austria) Marco Wörgötter	(Switzerland) Gregor Deschwanden	
221	2	30 July 2023	(France) Courchevel (Tremplin du Praz HS132)	LH _{171}	(Bulgaria) Vladimir Zografski	(Switzerland) Gregor Deschwanden	(Austria) Marco Wörgötter	(Switzerland) Gregor Deschwanden (Bulgaria) Vladimir Zografski	
222	3	5 August 2023	(Poland) Szczyrk (Skalite HS104)	NH _{051}	(Bulgaria) Vladimir Zografski	(Poland) Aleksander Zniszczoł	(Poland) Piotr Żyła	(Bulgaria) Vladimir Zografski	
223	4	(Note: One round only due to strong wind.)6 August 2023	(Poland) Szczyrk (Skalite HS104)	NH _{052}	(Poland) Piotr Żyła	(Bulgaria) Vladimir Zografski	(Germany) Luca Roth	(Bulgaria) Vladimir Zografski	
224	5	23 September 2023	(Romania) Râșnov (Trambulina Valea Cărbunării HS97)	NH _{053}	(Switzerland) Gregor Deschwanden	(Japan) Ren Nikaido	(Turkey) Fatih Arda İpcioğlu	(Bulgaria) Vladimir Zografski	
225	6	24 September 2023	(Romania) Râșnov (Trambulina Valea Cărbunării HS97)	NH _{054}	(Bulgaria) Vladimir Zografski	(Switzerland) Gregor Deschwanden	(Switzerland) Remo Imhof	(Bulgaria) Vladimir Zografski	
226	7	30 September 2023	(Austria) Hinzenbach (Aigner-Schanze HS90)	NH _{055}	(Germany) Andreas Wellinger	(Germany) Stephan Leyhe	(Austria) Daniel Tschofenig	(Bulgaria) Vladimir Zografski	
227	8	1 October 2023	(Austria) Hinzenbach (Aigner-Schanze HS90)	NH _{056}	(Switzerland) Gregor Deschwanden	(Bulgaria) Vladimir Zografski	(Austria) Daniel Tschofenig	(Bulgaria) Vladimir Zografski	
228	9	7 October 2023	(Germany) Klingenthal (Vogtland Arena HS140)	LH _{172}	(Austria) Manuel Fettner	(Poland) Dawid Kubacki	(Austria) Daniel Tschofenig	(Bulgaria) Vladimir Zografski	
30th FIS Grand Prix overall (29 July–7 October)					(Bulgaria) Vladimir Zografski	(Switzerland) Gregor Deschwanden	(Japan) Ren Nikaido		

=== Standings ===
==== Overall ====
Rank	after all 9 events	Points
	(Bulgaria) Vladimir Zografski	604
2	(Switzerland) Gregor Deschwanden	582
3	(Japan) Ren Nikaido	315
4	(Poland) Piotr Żyła	220
5	(Poland) Dawid Kubacki	198
6	(Germany) Andreas Wellinger	182
7	(Poland) Aleksander Zniszczoł	181
8	(Austria) Daniel Tschofenig	180
9	(Germany) Stephan Leyhe	166
10	(Austria) Manuel Fettner	157

==== Nations Cup ====
Rank	after all 10 events	Points
	Austria	1298
2	Germany	1038
3	Poland	927
4	Japan	916
5	Switzerland	912
6	Norway	638
7	Bulgaria	604
8	Slovenia	277
9	Italy	167
10	United States	148

==== Prize money ====
Rank	after all 10 payouts	CHF
1	(Bulgaria) Vladimir Zografski	24 500
2	(Switzerland) Gregor Deschwanden	21 000
3	(Japan) Ren Nikaido (Germany) Andreas Wellinger	7 250
5	(Poland) Piotr Żyła	7 000
6	(Austria) Daniel Tschofenig	6 500
7	(Austria) Manuel Fettner	6 000
8	(Austria) Marco Wörgötter	4 000
9	(Germany) Stephan Leyhe (Poland) Aleksander Zniszczoł	3 500

== Women ==
Grand Prix history in real time

Total	LH	NH	Winners
53	17	36	11

after LH event in Klingenthal (7 October 2023)

=== Calendar ===
NH – normal hill / LH – large hill
All	#	Date	Place (Hill)	Event	Winner	Second	Third	Yellow bib	R.
2023 European Games • (Poland) Kraków-Małopolska (27–30 June)
		28 July 2023	(Germany) Hinterzarten (Adler Ski Stadium HS111)	LH _{cnx}	cancelled due to financial problems				
		29 July 2023	(Germany) Hinterzarten (Adler Ski Stadium HS111)	LH _{cnx}	cancelled due to financial problems				
47	1	29 July 2023	(France) Courchevel (Tremplin du Praz HS132)	LH _{015}	(Slovenia) Nika Križnar	(Japan) Sara Takanashi	(Canada) Alexandria Loutitt	(Slovenia) Nika Križnar	
48	2	30 July 2023	(France) Courchevel (Tremplin du Praz HS132)	LH _{016}	(Slovenia) Nika Križnar	(Japan) Sara Takanashi	(Canada) Alexandria Loutitt	(Slovenia) Nika Križnar	
49	3	5 August 2023	(Poland) Szczyrk (Skalite HS104)	NH _{033}	(Slovenia) Nika Križnar	(Japan) Sara Takanashi	(Canada) Alexandria Loutitt	(Slovenia) Nika Križnar	
50	4	6 August 2023	(Poland) Szczyrk (Skalite HS104)	NH _{034}	(Slovenia) Nika Križnar	(Slovenia) Nika Prevc	(Canada) Alexandria Loutitt	(Slovenia) Nika Križnar	
51	5	23 September 2023	(Romania) Râșnov (Trambulina Valea Cărbunării HS97)	NH _{035}	(Slovenia) Nika Križnar	(Slovenia) Ema Klinec	(Japan) Nozomi Maruyama	(Slovenia) Nika Križnar	
52	6	24 September 2023	(Romania) Râșnov (Trambulina Valea Cărbunării HS97)	NH _{036}	(Slovenia) Nika Križnar	(Slovenia) Ema Klinec	(Slovenia) Nika Prevc	(Slovenia) Nika Križnar	
53	7	7 October 2023	(Germany) Klingenthal (Vogtland Arena HS140)	LH _{017}	(Slovenia) Ema Klinec	(Slovenia) Nika Križnar	(Austria) Jacqueline Seifriedsberger	(Slovenia) Nika Križnar	
12th FIS Grand Prix overall (29 July–7 October)					(Slovenia) Nika Križnar	(Japan) Sara Takanashi	(Canada) Alexandria Loutitt		

=== Standings ===
==== Overall ====
Rank	after all 7 events	Points
	(Slovenia) Nika Križnar	680
2	(Japan) Sara Takanashi	326
3	(Canada) Alexandria Loutitt	322
4	(Slovenia) Nika Prevc	314
5	(Slovenia) Ema Klinec	260
6	(Canada) Abigail Strate	252
7	(Japan) Haruka Iwasa	199
8	(Japan) Kurumi Ichinohe	182
9	(Japan) Nozomi Maruyama	162
10	(Slovenia) Ajda Košnjek	157

==== Nations Cup ====
Rank	after all 8 events	Points
	Slovenia	1667
2	Japan	1319
3	Germany	786
4	Canada	590
5	Austria	287
6	Norway	284
7	China	206
8	Finland	151
9	Italy	146
10	Switzerland	127

==== Prize money ====
Rank	after all 8 payouts	CHF
1	(Slovenia) Nika Križnar	16 500
2	(Japan) Sara Takanashi	5 750
3	(Slovenia) Ema Klinec	5 250
4	(Canada) Alexandria Loutitt	4 250
5	(Slovenia) Nika Prevc	3 250
6	(Germany) Katharina Schmid	2 000
7	(Germany) Selina Freitag (Japan) Nozomi Maruyama	1 750
9	(Austria) Jacqueline Seifriedsberger (Canada) Abigail Strate	1 500

== Mixed team ==
World Cup history in real time

Total	LH	NH	Winners
10	5	5	4

after LH event in Klingenthal (8 October 2023)

Num	Season	Date	Place	Event	Winner	Second	Third	Yellow bib	Ref.
10	1	8 October 2023	(Germany) Klingenthal (Vogtland Arena HS140)	LH_{005}	Germany Selina Freitag; Martin Hamann; Katharina Schmid; Andreas Wellinger	Japan Sara Takanashi; Ren Nikaido; Yūki Itō; Ryōyū Kobayashi	Austria Marita Kramer; Daniel Tschofenig; Jacqueline Seifriedsberger; Manuel Fettner	Austria (men); Slovenia (women)	

== Podium table by nation ==
Table showing the Grand Prix podium places (gold–1st place, silver–2nd place, bronze–3rd place) by the countries represented by the athletes.

Rank	Nation	Gold	Silver	Bronze	Total
1	Slovenia	7	4	1	12
2	Bulgaria	3	3	0	6
3	Switzerland	3	2	1	6
4	Germany	2	1	1	4
5	Poland	1	2	1	4
6	Austria	1	0	7	8
7	Japan	0	5	1	6
8	Canada	0	0	4	4
9	Turkey	0	0	1	1
Totals (9 entries)		17	17	17	51

== Points distribution ==
The table shows the number of points won in the 2023 FIS Ski Jumping Grand Prix for men and women.

Place	1	2	3	4	5	6	7	8	9	10	11	12	13	14	15	16	17	18	19	20	21	22	23	24	25	26	27	28	29	30
Individual	100	80	60	50	45	40	36	32	29	26	24	22	20	18	16	15	14	13	12	11	10	9	8	7	6	5	4	3	2	1
Mixed Team	200	175	150	125	100	75	50	25

== See also ==
- 2023–24 FIS Ski Jumping World Cup
- 2023–24 FIS Ski Jumping Continental Cup
- 2023–24 FIS Ski Jumping Inter-Continental Cup
- 2023–24 FIS Cup (ski jumping)
