= 2019–20 FIS Cup (ski jumping) =

FIS Cup 2019/20
Discipline	Men	Women
Overall	(Germany) Tim Fuchs	(Czech Republic) Klára Ulrichová

Competition
Edition	15th	8th
Locations	11	8
Individual	22	16
Cancelled	2	-

The 2019/20 FIS Cup (ski jumping) was the 15th FIS Cup season in ski jumping for men and the 8th for women.

Other competitive circuits this season include the World Cup, Grand Prix, Continental Cup, FIS Race and Alpen Cup.

== Calendar ==
=== Men ===
#	Date	Place	Hill	Size	Winner	Second	Third	Yellow bib	R.
1	6 July 2019	(Poland) Szczyrk	Skalite HS104	NH	(Germany) Tim Fuchs	(Austria) Maximilian Lienher	(Austria) Maximilian Steiner	(Germany) Tim Fuchs	
2	7 July 2019	(Poland) Szczyrk	Skalite HS104	NH	(Austria) Claudio Mörth	(Austria) Maximilian Steiner	(Austria) Maximilian Lienher	(Austria) Claudio Mörth	
3	11 July 2019	(Kazakhstan) Shchuchinsk	Lyzhnyy Tramplin Burabay HS99	NH	(Austria) Maximilian Lienher	(Germany) Luca Roth	(Slovenia) Cene Prevc	(Austria) Maximilian Lienher	
4	12 July 2019	(Kazakhstan) Shchuchinsk	Lyzhnyy Tramplin Burabay HS99	NH	(Austria) Maximilian Lienher	(Slovenia) Cene Prevc	(Germany) Luca Roth	(Austria) Maximilian Lienher	
5	3 August 2019	(Slovenia) Ljubno	Savina Ski Jumping Center HS94	NH	(Austria) Stefan Rainer	(Slovenia) Tjaš Grilc	(United States) Casey Larson	(Austria) Maximilian Lienher	
6	4 August 2019	(Slovenia) Ljubno	Savina Ski Jumping Center HS94	NH	(Slovenia) Jernej Presečnik	(Slovenia) Tjaš Grilc	(United States) Casey Larson	(Austria) Maximilian Lienher	
7	17 August 2019	(South Korea) Pyeongchang	Alpensia Ski Jumping Centre HS109	NH	(Germany) Tim Fuchs	(South Korea) Choi Heung-chul	(Japan) Shinnosuke Fujita	(Germany) Tim Fuchs	
8	18 August 2019	(South Korea) Pyeongchang	Alpensia Ski Jumping Centre HS109	NH	(Japan) Ren Nikaido	(South Korea) Choi Seou	(Japan) Shinnosuke Fujita	(Germany) Tim Fuchs	
9	24 August 2019	(Romania) Râșnov	Trambulina Valea Cărbunării HS97	NH	(Austria) Markus Rupitsch	(Poland) Adam Niznik	(Japan) Yuto Nakamura	(Germany) Tim Fuchs	
10	25 August 2019	(Romania) Râșnov	Trambulina Valea Cărbunării HS97	NH	(Austria) Markus Rupitsch	(Poland) Adam Niznik	(Japan) Shinya Komaba	(Germany) Tim Fuchs	
11	5 October 2019	(Austria) Villach	Villacher Alpenarena HS98	NH	(Norway) Christian Ingebrigtsen	(Poland) Adam Niżnik	(Norway) Matias Braathen	(Germany) Tim Fuchs	
12	6 October 2019	(Austria) Villach	Villacher Alpenarena HS98	NH	(Norway) Matias Braathen	(Finland) Jarkko Määttä	(Austria) Peter Resinger	(Germany) Tim Fuchs	
13	13 December 2019	(Norway) Notodden	Tveitanbakken HS98	NH	(Austria) Stefan Rainer	(Russia) Ilya Mankov	(Norway) Sander Vossan Eriksen	(Germany) Tim Fuchs	
14	14 December 2019	(Norway) Notodden	Tveitanbakken HS98	NH	(Germany) Fabian Seidl	(Austria) Stefan Rainer	(Norway) Anders Ladehaug	(Germany) Tim Fuchs	
15	21 December 2019	(Germany) Oberwiesenthal	Fichtelbergschanzen HS105	NH	(Russia) Danił Sadreev	(Austria) Maximilian Steiner	(Austria) Stefan Rainer	(Germany) Tim Fuchs	
16	22 December 2019	(Germany) Oberwiesenthal	Fichtelbergschanzen HS105	NH	(Slovenia) Jaka Hvala (Germany) Tim Fuchs		(Austria) Maximilian Steiner	(Germany) Tim Fuchs	
17	18 January 2019	(Poland) Zakopane	Wielka Krokiew HS140	LH	(Austria) Maximilian Steiner	(Austria) Stefan Rainer	(Austria) Josef Ritzer	(Germany) Tim Fuchs	
18	19 January 2019	(Poland) Zakopane	Wielka Krokiew HS140	LH	(Austria) Stefan Rainer	(Austria) Maximilian Steiner	(Austria) Francisco Mörth	(Germany) Tim Fuchs	
19	25 January 2020	(Germany) Rastbüchl	Baptist Kitzlinger Schanze HS78	MH	(Austria) Thomas Lackner	(Italy) Federico Cecon	(Austria) Stefan Rainer	(Germany) Tim Fuchs	
20	26 January 2020	(Germany) Rastbüchl	Baptist Kitzlinger Schanze HS78	MH	(Austria) Stefan Rainer	(Germany) Felix Hoffmann	(Germany) Justin Nietzel	(Austria) Stefan Rainer	
21	15 February 2020	(Austria) Villach	Villacher Alpenarena HS98	NH	(Austria) Marco Wörgötter	(Austria) Peter Resinger	(Slovenia) Mark Hafnar	(Austria) Stefan Rainer	
22	16 February 2020	(Austria) Villach	Villacher Alpenarena HS98	NH	(Austria) Marco Wörgötter	(Austria) Thomas Lackner	(Slovenia) Jernej Presečnik	(Germany) Tim Fuchs	
	22 February 2020	(Czech Republic) Liberec	Ještěd B HS100	NH	Cancelled				
	23 February 2020	(Czech Republic) Liberec	Ještěd B HS100	NH	Cancelled				

=== Women ===
#	Date	Place	Hill	Size	Winner	Second	Third	Yellow bib	R.
1	6 July 2019	(Poland) Szczyrk	Skalite HS104	NH	(Slovenia) Špela Rogelj	(Czech Republic) Karolína Indráčková	(Japan) Yūka Setō	(Slovenia) Špela Rogelj	
2	7 July 2019	(Poland) Szczyrk	Skalite HS104	NH	(Slovenia) Špela Rogelj	(Czech Republic) Karolína Indráčková	(Japan) Yūka Setō	(Slovenia) Špela Rogelj	
3	11 July 2019	(Kazakhstan) Shchuchinsk	Lyzhnyy Tramplin Burabay HS99	NH	(Kazakhstan) Valentina Sderzhikova	(Russia) Kristina Prokopieva	(Russia) Aleksandra Barantceva	(Slovenia) Špela Rogelj	
4	12 July 2019	(Kazakhstan) Shchuchinsk	Lyzhnyy Tramplin Burabay HS99	NH	(Russia) Irma Machinya	(Kazakhstan) Valentina Sderzhikova	(Russia) Kristina Prokopieva	(Slovenia) Špela Rogelj	
5	3 August 2019	(Slovenia) Ljubno	Savina Ski Jumping Center HS94	NH	(Slovenia) Urša Bogataj	(Slovenia) Nika Križnar	(Slovenia) Špela Rogelj	(Slovenia) Špela Rogelj	
6	4 August 2019	(Slovenia) Ljubno	Savina Ski Jumping Center HS94	NH	(Slovenia) Nika Križnar	(Slovenia) Urša Bogataj	(Slovenia) Jerneja Brecl	(Slovenia) Špela Rogelj	
7	24 August 2019	(Romania) Râșnov	Trambulina Valea Cărbunării HS97	NH	(Romania) Daniela Haralambie	(Czech Republic) Klára Ulrichová	(Hungary) Virág Vörös	(Slovenia) Špela Rogelj	
8	25 August 2019	(Romania) Râșnov	Trambulina Valea Cărbunării HS97	NH	(Romania) Daniela Haralambie	(Czech Republic) Štěpánka Ptáčková	(Czech Republic) Klára Ulrichová	(Czech Republic) Klára Ulrichová	
9	5 October 2019	(Austria) Villach	Villacher Alpenarena HS98	NH	(Germany) Agnes Reisch	(Austria) Julia Mühlbacher	(Austria) Sophie Sorschag	(Czech Republic) Klára Ulrichová	
10	6 October 2019	(Austria) Villach	Villacher Alpenarena HS98	NH	(Germany) Agnes Reisch	(Austria) Julia Mühlbacher	(Czech Republic) Karolína Indráčková	(Czech Republic) Klára Ulrichová	
11	21 December 2019	(Germany) Oberwiesenthal	Fichtelbergschanzen HS105	NH	(Germany) Selina Freitag	(Czech Republic) Klára Ulrichová	(Poland) Kinga Rajda	(Czech Republic) Klára Ulrichová	
12	22 December 2019	(Germany) Oberwiesenthal	Fichtelbergschanzen HS106	NH	(Poland) Kinga Rajda	(Czech Republic) Klára Ulrichová	(Germany) Selina Freitag	(Czech Republic) Klára Ulrichová	
13	25 January 2020	(Germany) Rastbüchl	Baptist Kitzlinger Schanze HS78	MH	(China) Wang Liangyao	(Czech Republic) Štěpánka Ptáčková	(Slovenia) Lara Logar	(Czech Republic) Klára Ulrichová	
14	26 January 2020	(Germany) Rastbüchl	Baptist Kitzlinger Schanze HS78	MH	(China) Wang Liangyao	(Slovenia) Lara Logar	(Austria) Elisabeth Raudaschl	(Czech Republic) Klára Ulrichová	
15	15 February 2020	(Austria) Villach	Villacher Alpenarena HS98	NH	(Japan) Yūka Setō	(Japan) Nozomi Maruyama	(Italy) Manuela Malsiner	(Czech Republic) Klára Ulrichová	
16	16 February 2020	(Austria) Villach	Villacher Alpenarena HS98	NH	(Austria) Sophie Sorschag	(Italy) Manuela Malsiner	(Czech Republic) Štěpánka Ptáčková	(Czech Republic) Klára Ulrichová	

== Overall standings ==
=== Men ===
Rank	after all 22 events	Points
1	(Germany) Tim Fuchs	797
2	(Austria) Stefan Rainer	772
3	(Austria) Maximilian Steiner	631
4	(Poland) Adam Niżnik	509
5	(Austria) Maximilian Lienher	463

=== Women ===
Rank	after all 16 events	Points
1	(Czech Republic) Klára Ulrichová	649
2	(Czech Republic) Štěpánka Ptáčková	430
3	(Czech Republic) Karolína Indráčková	372
4	(Romania) Daniela Haralambie	346
5	(Poland) Kinga Rajda	339
