= 2020 FIS Ski Jumping Grand Prix =

Grand Prix 2020
Discipline	Men	Women

Competition
Edition	27th	9th
Locations	1	1
Individual	2	1
Team	—	—
Mixed	—	—
Cancelled	6	5

The 2020 FIS Ski Jumping Grand Prix was the 27th Summer Grand Prix season in ski jumping for men and the 9th for ladies. On July 31, the International Ski Federation announced the decision that due to the cancellation of most competitions in the series, no prize will be awarded to the winner of the general classification.

Other competitive circuits this season included the World Cup, Continental Cup, FIS Cup, FIS Race and Alpen Cup.

== Calendar ==
=== Men ===
Num	Season	Date	Place	Hill	Size	Winner	Second	Third	Yellow bib	Ref.
204	1	22 August 2020	(Poland) Wisła	Malinka HS134 (night)	LH	(Poland) Dawid Kubacki	(Poland) Kamil Stoch	(Poland) Piotr Żyła	(Poland) Dawid Kubacki	
205	2	23 August 2020	(Poland) Wisła	Malinka HS134 (night)	LH	(Poland) Dawid Kubacki	(Poland) Kamil Stoch	(Poland) Piotr Żyła	(Poland) Dawid Kubacki	
		5 September 2020	(Kazakhstan) Shchuchinsk	National Ski Center HS140 (night)	LH	Cancelled due to the coronavirus pandemic				
		6 September 2020	(Kazakhstan) Shchuchinsk	National Ski Center HS140 (night)	LH	Cancelled due to the coronavirus pandemic				
		12 September 2020	(Russia) Chaykovsky	Snezhinka HS140 (night)	LH	Cancelled due to the coronavirus pandemic				
		13 September 2020	(Russia) Chaykovsky	Snezhinka HS140 (night)	LH	Cancelled due to the coronavirus pandemic				
		27 September 2020	(Austria) Hinzenbach	Aigner-Schanze HS90	NH	Cancelled due to the coronavirus pandemic				
		3 October 2020	(Germany) Klingenthal	Vogtland Arena HS140	LH	Cancelled due to the coronavirus pandemic				

=== Ladies ===
Num	Season	Date	Place	Hill	Size	Winner	Second	Third	Yellow bib	Ref.
34	1	15 August 2020	(Czech Republic) Frenštát pod Radhoštěm	Areal Horečky HS106	NH	(Slovenia) Nika Križnar	(Austria) Marita Kramer	(Slovenia) Ema Klinec	(Slovenia) Nika Križnar	
		5 September 2020	(Kazakhstan) Shchuchinsk	National Ski Center HS99	NH	Cancelled due to the coronavirus pandemic				
		6 September 2020	(Kazakhstan) Shchuchinsk	National Ski Center HS99	NH	Cancelled due to the coronavirus pandemic				
		12 September 2020	(Russia) Chaykovsky	Snezhinka HS140 (night)	LH	Cancelled due to the coronavirus pandemic				
		13 September 2020	(Russia) Chaykovsky	Snezhinka HS140 (night)	LH	Cancelled due to the coronavirus pandemic				
		3 October 2020	(Germany) Klingenthal	Vogtland Arena HS140	LH	Cancelled due to the coronavirus pandemic				
