= 2023–24 FIS Ski Jumping Inter-Continental Cup =

Ski-jumping competition series

2023–24 FIS Inter-Continental Cup
Winners
- Summer (Overall): (Italy) Annika Sieff
- Summer (Nations Cup): Italy
- Winter (Overall): (Slovenia) Tina Erzar
- Winter (Nations Cup): Norway

Competitions
- Venues: 2 (Summer), 6 (Winter)
- Individual: 4 (Summer), 12 (Winter)
- Cancelled: 5 (Summer), 4 (Winter)

The 2023–24 FIS Ski Jumping Inter-Continental Cup, the women's second level competition, equaled men's Continental Cup and organized by the International Ski Federation (FIS) was the 1st edition of the Women's Inter-Continental Cup – the second highest competition series of ski jumping for women, which was created as a result of combining two previous competitions – and succeeded the women's Continental Cup (2004/05) season and the FIS Cup (2012/13).

The season started on 9 September 2023 in Oslo, Norway and concluded on 9 March 2024 in Lahti, Finland. Five events were cancelled in summer and four in winter.

Annika Sieff and Team of Italy won summer overall; Tina Erzar and Team of Norway in winter.

Other competitive circuits this season include the World Cup, Grand Prix, Continental Cup, FIS Cup, Alpen Cup and New Star Trophy.

== Women's Summer ==
Individual summer events in the ICC history

Total	L	N	Winners
4	—	4	3

after normal hill event in Stams (17 September 2023)

=== Calendar ===
N – normal hill / L – large hill
All	#	Date	Place (Hill)	Ev.	Winner	Second	Third	Overall leader	R.
		2 September 2023	(Slovenia) Ljubno (Savina HS94)	N _{cnx}	cancelled due to flooding in Slovenia and partial destruction of the hill			—	
		3 September 2023	(Slovenia) Ljubno (Savina HS94)	N _{cnx}	cancelled due to flooding in Slovenia and partial destruction of the hill			—	
1	1	9 September 2023	(Norway) Oslo (Midtstubakken HS106)	N _{001}	(Norway) I. S. Midtskogen	(Italy) Annika Sieff	(Italy) Lara Malsiner	(Norway) I. S. Midtskogen	
2	2	10 September 2023	(Norway) Oslo (Midtstubakken HS106)	N _{002}	(Italy) Annika Sieff	(Norway) I. S. Midtskogen	(Norway) Kjersti Græsli	(Norway) I. S. Midtskogen (Italy) Annika Sieff	
3	3	16 September 2023	(Austria) Stams (Brunnentalschanze HS115)	N _{003}	(France) Joséphine Pagnier	(Italy) Annika Sieff	(Germany) Pia Lilian Kübler	(Italy) Annika Sieff	
4	4	17 September 2023	(Austria) Stams (Brunnentalschanze HS115)	N _{004}	(Italy) Annika Sieff	(France) Joséphine Pagnier	(Switzerland) Sina Arnet	(Italy) Annika Sieff	
		6 October 2023	(United States) Lake Placid (MacKenzie Intervale HS128)	L _{cnx}	cancelled due to lack interest from other countries.			—	
		7 October 2023	(United States) Lake Placid (MacKenzie Intervale HS128)	L _{cnx}	cancelled due to lack interest from other countries.			—	
		8 October 2023	(United States) Lake Placid (MacKenzie Intervale HS128)	L _{cnx}	cancelled due to lack interest from other countries.			—	
1st FIS Summer Inter-Continental Cup Overall (13 – 28 September 2025)					(Switzerland) Sina Arnet	(Japan) Yū Saitō	(China) Ping Zeng	Summer Overall	

==== Overall ====
Rank	after 4 events	Points
	(Italy) Annika Sieff	360
2	(Italy) Lara Malsiner	196
3	(Norway) Ingvild Synnøve Midtskogen (France) Joséphine Pagnier	180
5	(Norway) Heidi Dyhre Traaserud	136
6	(Germany) Pia Lilian Kübler	110
7	(Switzerland) Sina Arnet	105
8	(Norway) Kjersti Græsli	86
9	(United States) Josie Johnson	85
10	(Poland) Nicole Konderla	82

==== Nations Cup ====
Rank	after 4 events	Points
	Italy	639
2	Norway	575
3	Slovenia	262
4	Germany	261
5	Poland	227
6	France	203
7	United States	182
8	Switzerland	172
9	Czech Republic	154
10	Austria	57

== Women's Winter ==
Individual summer events in the ICC history

Total	L	N	Winners
12	6	6	5

after large hill event in Lahti (9 March 2024)

=== Calendar ===
N – normal hill / L – large hill
All	#	Date	Place (Hill)	Ev.	Winner	Second	Third	Overall leader	R.
1	1	9 December 2023	(Norway) Lillehammer (Lysgårdsbakken HS98)	N _{001}	(Slovenia) Tina Erzar	(Germany) Agnes Reisch	(Czech Republic) Anežka Indráčková	(Slovenia) Tina Erzar	
2	2	10 December 2023	(Norway) Lillehammer (Lysgårdsbakken HS98)	N _{002}	(Germany) Agnes Reisch	(Germany) Juliane Seyfarth	(Czech Republic) Anežka Indráčková	(Germany) Agnes Reisch	
3	3	15 December 2023	(Norway) Notodden (Tveitanbakken HS98)	N _{003}	(Norway) I. Synnøve Midtskogen	(Norway) H. D. Traaserud	(Norway) Kjersti Græsli	(Norway) I. S. Midtskogen	
4	4	16 December 2023	(Norway) Notodden (Tveitanbakken HS98)	N _{004}	(Norway) I. Synnøve Midtskogen	(Norway) Kjersti Græsli	(Norway) H. Wiegele	(Norway) I. S. Midtskogen	
5	5	6 January 2024	(Sweden) Falun (Lugnet HS100)	N _{005}	(Austria) Hannah Wiegele	(Austria) Katharina Ellmauer	(Norway) Kjersti Græsli	(Norway) I. S. Midtskogen	
6	6	7 January 2024	(Sweden) Falun (Lugnet HS100)	N _{006}	(Austria) Hannah Wiegele	(Austria) Katharina Ellmauer	(Norway) Kjersti Græsli	(Norway) Kjersti Græsli	
7	7	12 January 2024	(Austria) Innsbruck (Bergiselschanze HS128)	L _{001}	(Czech Republic) Anežka Indráčková	(Norway) H. D. Traaserud	(Austria) Hannah Wiegele	(Norway) Kjersti Græsli	
8	8	13 January 2024	(Austria) Innsbruck (Bergiselschanze HS128)	L _{002}	(Austria) Hannah Wiegele	(Slovenia) Tina Erzar	(Norway) H. D. Traaserud	(Austria) H. Wiegele	
2024 Winter Youth Olympics (20 – 21 January • (South Korea) Gangwon)
		3 February 2024	(Poland) Szczyrk (Skalite HS104)	N _{cnx}	cancelled			—	
		4 February 2024	(Poland) Szczyrk (Skalite HS104)	N _{cnx}	cancelled			—	
2024 Nordic Junior World Ski Championships (5 – 11 February • (Slovenia) Planica)
9	9	17 February 2024	(Germany) Brotterode (Inselbergschanze HS117)	L _{003}	(Slovenia) Tina Erzar	(Norway) Kjersti Græsli	(Czech Republic) Veronika Jenčová	(Austria) H. Wiegele	
10	10	18 February 2024	(Germany) Brotterode (Inselbergschanze HS117)	L _{004}	(Slovenia) Tina Erzar	(Norway) I. Synnøve Midtskogen	(Norway) Kjersti Græsli	(Slovenia) Tina Erzar	
		23 February 2024	(Austria) Villach (Villacher Alpenarena HS98)	N _{cnx}	cancelled due to high temperatures and lack of snow			—	
		24 February 2024	(Austria) Villach (Villacher Alpenarena HS98)	N _{cnx}	cancelled due to high temperatures and lack of snow			—	
11	11	8 March 2024	(Finland) Lahti (Salpausselkä HS130)	L _{005}	(Slovenia) Tina Erzar	(Austria) Hannah Wiegele	(Austria) Katharina Ellmauer	(Slovenia) Tina Erzar	
12	12	9 March 2023	(Finland) Lahti (Salpausselkä HS130)	L _{006}	(Slovenia) Tina Erzar	(Austria) Hannah Wiegele	(Austria) Katharina Ellmauer	(Slovenia) Tina Erzar	
1st FIS Winter Ski Jumping Inter-Continental Cup Overall (9 December 2023 – 9 March 2024)					(Slovenia) Tina Erzar	(Norway) Kjersti Græsli	(Austria) Hannah Wiegele	Winter Overall	

==== Winter ====
Rank	after 12 events	Points
	(Slovenia) Tina Erzar	654
2	(Austria) Hannah Wiegele	572
3	(Norway) Kjersti Græsli	436
4	(Norway) Ingvild Synnøve Midtskogen	420
5	(Norway) Heidi Dyhre Traaserud	400
6	(Austria) Katharina Ellmauer	393
7	(Italy) Martina Ambrosi	296
8	(Slovenia) Urša Vidmar	291
9	(Czech Republic) Anežka Indráčková	265
10	(Slovenia) Jerica Jesenko	240

==== Nations Cup ====
Rank	after 12 events	Points
	Norway	1810
2	Slovenia	1460
3	Germany	1118
4	Austria	1035
5	Czech Republic	800
6	Italy; Poland	501
8	United States	287
9	Finland	273
10	Ukraine	212

== Podium table by nation ==
Table showing the Inter-Continental Cup podium places (gold–1st place, silver–2nd place, bronze–3rd place) by the countries represented by the athletes.

Rank	Nation	Gold	Silver	Bronze	Total
1	Slovenia	5	1	0	6
2	Norway	3	6	7	16
3	Austria	3	4	3	10
4	Italy	2	2	1	5
5	Germany	1	2	1	4
6	France	1	1	0	2
7	Czech Republic	1	0	3	4
8	Switzerland	0	0	1	1
Totals (8 entries)		16	16	16	48

== See also ==
- 2023–24 FIS Ski Jumping World Cup
- 2023 FIS Ski Jumping Grand Prix
- 2023–24 FIS Ski Jumping Continental Cup (men)
