= 2019 FIS Ski Jumping Grand Prix =

International ski jumping competition

Grand Prix 2019
Discipline	Men	Women
Overall	(Poland) Dawid Kubacki	(Japan) Sara Takanashi
Nations Cup	Japan	Slovenia

Competition
Edition	26th	8th
Locations	7	4
Individual	8	3
Team	2	—
Mixed	1	1

The 2019 FIS Ski Jumping Grand Prix was the 26th Summer Grand Prix season in ski jumping for men and the 8th for ladies.

Other competitive circuits this season included the World Cup, Continental Cup, FIS Cup, FIS Race and Alpen Cup.

== Calendar ==
=== Men ===
Num	Season	Date	Place	Hill	Size	Winner	Second	Third	Yellow bib	Ref.
196	1	21 July 2019	(Poland) Wisła	Malinka HS134 (night)	LH	(Slovenia) Timi Zajc	(Poland) Dawid Kubacki	(Russia) Evgeniy Klimov	(Slovenia) Timi Zajc	
197	2	27 July 2019	(Germany) Hinterzarten	Rothaus-Schanze HS108	NH	(Germany) Karl Geiger	(Austria) Gregor Schlierenzauer	(Germany) Richard Freitag	(Germany) Karl Geiger	
198	3	10 August 2019	(France) Courchevel	Tremplin du Praz HS135	LH	(Slovenia) Timi Zajc	(Norway) Robert Johansson	(Japan) Naoki Nakamura	(Slovenia) Timi Zajc	
199	4	18 August 2019	(Poland) Zakopane	Wielka Krokiew HS140 (night)	LH	(Poland) Kamil Stoch	(Poland) Dawid Kubacki	(Japan) Yukiya Satō	(Slovenia) Timi Zajc	
200	5	23 August 2019	(Japan) Hakuba	Olympic Ski Jumps HS131 (night)	LH	(Japan) Ryōyū Kobayashi	(Japan) Yukiya Satō	(Japan) Keiichi Satō	(Slovenia) Timi Zajc	
201	6	24 August 2019	(Japan) Hakuba	Olympic Ski Jumps HS131 (night)	LH	(Japan) Ryōyū Kobayashi	(Japan) Keiichi Satō	(Japan) Yukiya Satō	(Japan) Yukiya Satō	
202	7	29 September 2019	(Austria) Hinzenbach	Aigner-Schanze HS90	NH	(Poland) Dawid Kubacki	(Austria) Philipp Aschenwald	(Poland) Piotr Żyła	(Japan) Yukiya Satō	
203	8	5 October 2019	(Germany) Klingenthal	Vogtland Arena HS140	LH	(Slovenia) Anže Lanišek	(Norway) Marius Lindvik	(Poland) Piotr Żyła	(Poland) Dawid Kubacki	

=== Ladies ===
Num	Season	Date	Place	Hill	Size	Winner	Second	Third	Yellow bib	Ref.
31	1	26 July 2019	(Germany) Hinterzarten	Rothaus-Schanze HS108 (night)	NH	(Japan) Sara Takanashi	(Norway) Maren Lundby	(Slovenia) Nika Križnar	(Japan) Sara Takanashi	
32	2	9 August 2019	(France) Courchevel	Tremplin du Praz HS135	LH	(Japan) Sara Takanashi	(Austria) Chiara Hölzl	(Germany) Juliane Seyfarth	(Japan) Sara Takanashi	
33	3	18 August 2019	(Czech Republic) Frenštát pod Radhoštěm	Areal Horečky HS106	NH	(Slovenia) Nika Križnar	(Germany) Juliane Seyfarth	(Slovenia) Urša Bogataj	(Japan) Sara Takanashi	

=== Men's team ===
Num	Season	Date	Place	Hill	Size	Winner	Second	Third	Yellow bib	Ref.
24	1	20 July 2019	(Poland) Wisła	Malinka HS134 (night)	LH	Poland Piotr Żyła; Aleksander Zniszczoł; Kamil Stoch; Dawid Kubacki	Slovenia Tilen Bartol; Anže Lanišek; Peter Prevc; Timi Zajc	Norway Johann André Forfang; Robin Pedersen; Marius Lindvik; Daniel-André Tande	Poland	
25	2	17 August 2019	(Poland) Zakopane	Wielka Krokiew HS140	LH	Japan Naoki Nakamura; Keiichi Satō; Yukiya Satō; Junshirō Kobayashi	Poland Piotr Żyła; Jakub Wolny; Kamil Stoch; Dawid Kubacki	Norway Halvor Egner Granerud; Thomas Aasen Markeng; Marius Lindvik; Johann André Forfang	Slovenia	

=== Mixed team ===
Num	Season	Date	Place	Hill	Size	Winner	Second	Third	Yellow bib	Ref.
6	1	27 July 2019	(Germany) Hinterzarten	Rothaus-Schanze HS108	NH	Germany Juliane Seyfarth; Karl Geiger; Agnes Reich; Richard Freitag	Japan Nozomi Maruyama; Junshirō Kobayashi; Sara Takanashi; Keiichi Satō	Slovenia Nika Križnar; Peter Prevc; Urša Bogataj; Žiga Jelar	Slovenia	

== Men's standings ==
=== Overall ===
Rank	after 8 events	Points
1	(Poland) Dawid Kubacki	305
2	(Japan) Yukiya Satō	294
3	(Slovenia) Timi Zajc	268
4	(Japan) Ryōyū Kobayashi	261
5	(Germany) Karl Geiger	232

=== Nations Cup ===
Rank	after 11 events	Points
1	Japan	2185
2	Poland	1950
3	Slovenia	1427
4	Norway	1421
5	Germany	1243

=== Prize money ===
Rank	after 11 events	CHF
1	(Poland) Dawid Kubacki	14,000
2	(Slovenia) Timi Zajc	11,000
	(Japan) Ryōyū Kobayashi	11,000
4	(Japan) Yukiya Satō	8,500
5	(Poland) Kamil Stoch	7,500

== Ladies' standings ==
=== Overall ===
Rank	after 3 events	Points
1	(Japan) Sara Takanashi (2× winner)	200
2	(Slovenia) Nika Križnar (1× winner)	200
3	(Germany) Juliane Seyfarth	172
4	(Slovenia) Urša Bogataj	160
5	(Norway) Maren Lundby	125

=== Nations Cup ===
Rank	after 4 events	Points
1	Slovenia	715
2	Japan	563
3	Germany	530
4	Austria	314
5	Norway	268

=== Prize money ===
Rank	after 4 events	CHF
1	(Japan) Sara Takanashi	5,750
2	(Slovenia) Nika Križnar	4,250
3	(Germany) Juliane Seyfarth	3,750
4	(Slovenia) Urša Bogataj	2,500
5	(Norway) Maren Lundby	1,750
