= 2019–20 FIS Race (ski jumping) =

FIS Race 2019/20

The 2019/20 FIS Race (ski jumping) is the 20th FIS Race regular season as the fourth level of ski jumping competition since 1999/00. Although even before the world cup and in the old days FIS Race events were all top level organized competitions.

Other competitive circuits this season included the World Cup, Grand Prix, Continental Cup, FIS Cup and Alpen Cup.

== Calendar ==
=== Men ===
Season	Date	Place	Hill	Size	Winner	Second	Third	Ref.
1	23 August 2019	(Romania) Râșnov	Trambulina Valea Cărbunării HS71	MH	(Romania) Radu Mihai Păcurar	(Czech Republic) Radek Rýdl	(Finland) Kasperi Valto	
	6 March 2020	(Japan) Sapporo	Miyanomori HS100	NH	coronavirus pandemic			
	8 March 2020	(Japan) Sapporo	Ōkurayama HS137	LH	coronavirus pandemic			

=== Ladies ===
Season	Date	Place	Hill	Size	Winner	Second	Third	Ref.
1	23 August 2019	(Romania) Râșnov	Trambulina Valea Cărbunării HS71	MH	(Czech Republic) Štěpánka Ptáčková	(Czech Republic) Klára Ulrichová	(Czech Republic) Veronika Jenčová	
	6 March 2020	(Japan) Sapporo	Miyanomori HS100	NH	coronavirus pandemic			
	8 March 2020	(Japan) Sapporo	Ōkurayama HS137	LH	coronavirus pandemic			
