= 2020–21 FIS Ski Jumping Continental Cup =

Ski-jumping competition series

Continental Cup 2020/21
Discipline	Men	Women
Summer	(Germany) Martin Hamann	—
Winter	(Austria) Markus Schiffner	(Austria) Hannah Wiegele

Competition
Edition	19th (summer), 28th (winter)	17th (winter)
Locations	5 (summer), 14 (winter)	2 (summer), 3 (winter)
Individual	2 (summer), 29 (winter)	4 (summer), 6 (winter)
Cancelled	6 (summer), 10 (winter)	4 (summer), 4 (winter)
Rescheduled	2 (summer), 4 (winter)	.

The 2020/21 FIS Ski Jumping Continental Cup is the 30th in a row (28th official) Continental Cup winter season in ski jumping for men and the 17th for ladies. This is also the 19th summer continental cup season for men.

Other competitive circuits this season include the World Cup, Grand Prix, FIS Cup and Alpen Cup.

== Map of continental cup hosts ==
All 20 locations hosting continental cup events in summer (5 for men / 3 for ladies) and in winter (14 for men / 3 for ladies) this season.

2020–21 FIS Ski Jumping Continental Cup (Europe)	2020–21 FIS Ski Jumping Continental Cup (Asia) 2020–21 FIS Ski Jumping Continental Cup (North America)

Men Ladies Men & Ladies

== Men's Individual ==
Individual men's events in the Continental Cup history

Total	F	L	N	Winners	Competition
215	—	118	97		Summer
952	4	542	406		Winter

after large hill event in Chaykovsky (28 March 2021)

=== Summer ===
Num	#	Date	Place	Hill	Event	Winner	Second	Third	Yellow bib	Ref.
		29 August 2020	(Japan) Hakuba	Hakuba Ski Jumping Stadium HS131	L _{cnx}	Cancelled				
		30 August 2020	(Japan) Hakuba	Hakuba Ski Jumping Stadium HS131	L _{cnx}	Cancelled				
214	1	18 September 2020	(Poland) Wisła	Malinka HS134	L _{117}	(Germany) Martin Hamann	(Norway) Sander Vossan Eriksen	(Slovenia) Anže Lanišek	(Germany) Martin Hamann	
215	2	19 September 2020	(Poland) Wisła	Malinka HS134	L _{118}	(Germany) Martin Hamann	(Norway) Sander Vossan Eriksen	(Austria) Timon-Pascal Kahofer	(Germany) Martin Hamann	
		19 September 2020	(Austria) Stams	Brunnentalschanze HS115	L _{cnx}	cancelled				
		20 September 2020	(Austria) Stams	Brunnentalschanze HS115	L _{cnx}	cancelled				
		26 September 2020	(Germany) Klingenthal	Vogtland Arena HS140	L _{cnx}	cancelled				
		27 September 2020	(Germany) Klingenthal	Vogtland Arena HS140	L _{cnx}	cancelled				
		10 October 2020	(Romania) Râșnov	Trambulina Valea Cărbunării HS97	N _{cnx}	cancelled				
		11 October 2020	(Romania) Râșnov	Trambulina Valea Cărbunării HS97	N _{cnx}	cancelled				

=== Winter ===
Num	#	Date	Place	Hill	Event	Winner	Second	Third	Yellow bib	Ref.
		12 December 2020	(Norway) Lillehammer	Lysgårdsbakken HS140	LH	Cancelled				
		13 December 2020	(Norway) Lillehammer	Lysgårdsbakken HS140	LH	Cancelled				
934	1	18 December 2020	(Finland) Ruka	Rukatunturi HS142	L _{524}	(Austria) Stefan Rainer	(Austria) Jan Hörl	(Norway) Benedik Jakobsen Heggli	(Austria) Stefan Rainer	
935	2	19 December 2020	(Finland) Ruka	Rukatunturi HS142	LH	(Austria) Jan Hörl	(Poland) Jakub Wolny	(Finland) Eetu Nousiainen	(Austria) Jan Hörl	
936	3	19 December 2020	(Finland) Ruka	Rukatunturi HS142	LH	(Austria) Stefan Rainer	(Austria) Jan Hörl	(Austria) Clemens Leitner	(Austria) Jan Hörl	
937	4	27 December 2020	(Switzerland) Engelberg	Gross-Titlis-Schanze HS140	LH	(Poland) Jakub Wolny	(Slovenia) Tilen Bartol	(Austria) Gregor Schlierenzauer	(Austria) Jan Hörl	
938	5	28 December 2020	(Switzerland) Engelberg	Gross-Titlis-Schanze HS140	LH	(Austria) Maximilian Steiner	(Slovenia) Tilen Bartol	(Austria) Manuel Fettner	(Austria) Stefan Rainer	
		9 January 2021	(Slovenia) Planica	Bloudkova velikanka HS138	LH	Cancelled				
		10 January 2021	(Slovenia) Planica	Bloudkova velikanka HS138	LH	Cancelled				
939	6	16 January 2021	(Austria) Innsbruck	Bergisel HS128	LH	(Poland) Aleksander Zniszczoł	(Norway) Anders Håre	(Austria) Niklas Bachlinger	(Austria) Stefan Rainer	
940	7	16 January 2021	(Austria) Innsbruck	Bergisel HS128	LH	(Switzerland) Simon Ammann	(Austria) Niklas Bachlinger	(Slovenia) Lovro Kos	(Austria) Stefan Rainer	
		23 January 2021	(Germany) Garmisch-Partenkirchen	Große Olympiaschanze HS142	LH	Cancelled				
		24 January 2021	(Germany) Garmisch-Partenkirchen	Große Olympiaschanze HS142	LH	Cancelled				
		27 January 2021	(China) Zhangjiakou	Snow Ruyi HS106	NH	Cancelled				
		28 January 2021	(China) Zhangjiakou	Snow Ruyi HS106	NH	Cancelled				
		30 January 2021	(Japan) Sapporo	Okurayama HS137	LH	Cancelled				
		31 January 2021	(Japan) Sapporo	Okurayama HS137	LH	Cancelled				
941	8	5 February 2021	(Germany) Willingen	Mühlenkopfschanze HS147	LH	(Austria) Ulrich Wohlgenannt	(Austria) Markus Schiffner	(Slovenia) Cene Prevc	(Austria) Stefan Rainer	
942	9	5 February 2021	(Germany) Willingen	Mühlenkopfschanze HS147	LH	(Austria) Ulrich Wohlgenannt	(Austria) Markus Schiffner	(Norway) Sondre Ringen	(Austria) Stefan Rainer	
943	10	6 February 2021	(Germany) Willingen	Mühlenkopfschanze HS147	LH	(Austria) Ulrich Wohlgenannt	(Slovenia) Cene Prevc	(Austria) Markus Schiffner	(Austria) Ulrich Wohlgenannt	
944	11	6 February 2021	(Germany) Willingen	Mühlenkopfschanze HS147	LH	(Austria) Ulrich Wohlgenannt	(United States) Decker Dean	(Norway) Anders Håre	(Austria) Ulrich Wohlgenannt	
		13 February 2021	(United States) Iron Mountain	Pine Mountain Ski Jump HS133	LH	Cancelled				
		14 February 2021	(United States) Iron Mountain	Pine Mountain Ski Jump HS133	LH	Cancelled				
945	12	13 February 2021	(Germany) Klingenthal	Vogtland Arena HS140	LH	(Austria) Markus Schiffner	(Slovenia) Cene Prevc	(Austria) Manuel Fettner	(Austria) Ulrich Wohlgenannt	
946	13	14 February 2021	(Germany) Klingenthal	Vogtland Arena HS140	LH	(Austria) Markus Schiffner	(Slovenia) Cene Prevc	(Austria) Manuel Fettner	(Austria) Markus Schiffner	
947	14	20 February 2021	(Germany) Brotterode	Inselbergschanze HS117	LH	(Poland) Stefan Hula	(Austria) Markus Schiffner	(Japan) Junshirō Kobayashi	(Austria) Markus Schiffner	
948	15	21 February 2021	(Germany) Brotterode	Inselbergschanze HS117	LH	(Poland) Tomasz Pilch	(Japan) Junshirō Kobayashi	(Poland) Maciej Kot	(Austria) Markus Schiffner	
		6 March 2021	(Norway) Rena	Renabakkene HS139	LH	Cancelled				
		7 March 2021	(Norway) Rena	Renabakkene HS139	LH	Cancelled				
949	16	14 March 2021	(Poland) Zakopane	Wielka Krokiew HS140	LH	(Austria) Ulrich Wohlgenannt	(Austria) Manuel Fettner	(Slovenia) Cene Prevc	(Austria) Markus Schiffner	
950	17	14 March 2021	(Poland) Zakopane	Wielka Krokiew HS140	LH	(Austria) Ulrich Wohlgenannt	(Austria) Markus Schiffner	(Slovenia) Cene Prevc	(Austria) Markus Schiffner	
951	18	28 March 2021	(Russia) Chaykovsky	Snezhinka HS140	LH	(Poland) Aleksander Zniszczoł	(Austria) Manuel Fettner	(Poland) Stefan Hula	(Austria) Markus Schiffner	
952	19	28 March 2021	(Russia) Chaykovsky	Snezhinka HS140	L _{542}	(Poland) Stefan Hula	(Austria) Daniel Tschofenig	(Poland) Tomasz Pilch	(Austria) Markus Schiffner	

== Women's Individual ==
Individual women's events in the Continental Cup history

Total	L	N	M	Winners	Competition
62	2	49	11		Summer
168	19	134	15		Winter

after large hill event in Brotterode (21 February 2021)

=== Summer ===
Num	#	Date	Place	Hill	Event	Winner	Second	Third	Yellow bib	Ref.
		19 September 2020	(Austria) Stams	Brunnentalschanze HS115	LH	Cancelled				
		20 September 2020	(Austria) Stams	Brunnentalschanze HS115	LH	Cancelled				
		10 October 2020	(Romania) Râșnov	Trambulina Valea Cărbunării HS97	NH	Cancelled				
		11 October 2020	(Romania) Râșnov	Trambulina Valea Cărbunării HS97	NH	Cancelled				

=== Winter ===
Num	#	Date	Place	Hill	Event	Winner	Second	Third	Yellow bib	Ref.
		12 December 2020	(Norway) Lillehammer	Lysgårdsbakken HS140	LH	Cancelled				
		13 December 2020	(Norway) Lillehammer	Lysgårdsbakken HS140	LH	Cancelled				
		23 January 2021	(Norway) Notodden	Tveitanbakken HS100	NH	Cancelled				
		24 January 2021	(Norway) Notodden	Tveitanbakken HS100	NH	Cancelled				
167	1	20 February 2021	(Germany) Brotterode	Inselbergschanze HS117	L _{018}	(Austria) Hannah Wiegele	(Germany) Pauline Heßler	(Austria) Julia Mühlbacher	(Austria) Hannah Wiegele	
168	2	21 February 2021	(Germany) Brotterode	Inselbergschanze HS117	L _{019}	(Austria) Hannah Wiegele	(Russia) Ksenia Kablukova	(Slovenia) Jerneja Repinc Zupančič	(Austria) Hannah Wiegele	

== Men's standings ==
=== Summer ===
Rank	after 2 events	Points
1	(Germany) Martin Hamann	200
2	(Norway) Sander Vossan Eriksen	160
3	(Slovenia) Anže Lanišek	100
4	(Austria) Timon-Pascal Kahofer	96
5	(Austria) Markus Schiffner	90

=== Winter ===
Rank	after 19 events	Points
1	(Austria) Markus Schiffner	794
2	(Austria) Ulrich Wohlgenannt	661
3	(Austria) Manuel Fettner	566
4	(Poland) Aleksander Zniszczoł	527
5	(Slovenia) Cene Prevc	497

== Ladies' standings ==
=== Summer ===
Rank	after 0 events	Points
1
2
3
4
5

=== Winter ===
Rank	after 2 events	Points
1	(Austria) Hannah Wiegele	200
2	(Russia) Ksenia Kablukova	120
3	(Austria) Julia Mühlbacher	110
3	(Slovenia) Jerneja Repinc Zupančič	110
5	(Russia) Aleksandra Barantceva	85

== Europa Cup vs. Continental Cup ==
Last two seasons of Europa Cup in 1991/92 and 1992/93 are recognized as first two Continental Cup seasons by International Ski Federation, although Continental Cup under this name officially started first season in 1993/94 season.
