= 2023–24 FIS Cup (ski jumping) =

19th FIS Cup season in ski jumping for men

Winners
- Men: (Austria) Stefan Rainer
- Nations Cup: Austria

Competitions
- Venues: 10
- Individual: 20
- Cancelled: 4
- Rescheduled: 2

The 2023–24 FIS Cup (ski jumping), organized by the International Ski Federation (FIS) was the 19th FIS Cup season in ski jumping for men.

The season started on 26 August 2023 in Szczyrk, Poland and concluded on 15 March 2024 in Zakopane, Poland. The series included 20 competitions (8 in summer and 12 in winter).

Other competitive circuits this season included the World Cup, Grand Prix, Inter-Continental Cup, Continental Cup, Alpen Cup and New Star Trophy.

Maximilian Lienher from Austria was the defending overall champions from the previous season, but he did not defend the title. The new winner of the series was Stefan Rainer from Austria.

From this season – after 11 seasons – the women's FIS Cup has ended, which has been running continuously since the 2012–13 season. They are now merged with the Continental Cup and created as the new competition Inter-Continental Cup.

For the first time in the history of FIS Cup, the winter competition in Oberhof was held in hybrid conditions – the inrun track was covered with ice, while the landing hill was entirely covered with plastic mattings.

== Map of FIS Cup hosts ==
All 10 locations hosting FIS Cup events in this season (1 cancelled – Ljubno).

Europe

Cancelled

== Calendar ==
N – normal hill / L – large hill
#	Date	Place (Hill)	Event	Winner	Second	Third	R.
1	26 August 2023	(Poland) Szczyrk (Skalite HS104)	N	(Austria) Niklas Bachlinger	(Austria) Jonas Schuster	(Poland) Klemens Murańka	
2	27 August 2023	(Poland) Szczyrk (Skalite HS104)	N	(Poland) Klemens Murańka	(Austria) Jonas Schuster	(Germany) Adrian Tittel	
	2 September 2023	(Slovenia) Ljubno (Savina Ski Jumping Center HS94)	N	canceled due to flooding in Slovenia and partial destruction of the hill			
	3 September 2023	(Slovenia) Ljubno (Savina Ski Jumping Center HS94)	N	canceled due to flooding in Slovenia and partial destruction of the hill			
3	16 September 2023	(Switzerland) Einsiedeln (Andreas Küttel-Schanze HS117)	L	(Austria) Francisco Mörth	(Switzerland) Remo Imhof	(Germany) Simon Steinbeißer	
4	17 September 2023	(Switzerland) Einsiedeln (Andreas Küttel-Schanze HS117)	L	(Slovenia) Matija Vidic	(Austria) Francisco Mörth	(Poland) Andrzej Stękała	
5	(Note: Rescheduled from 9 September 2023)7 October 2023	(Austria) Villach (Villacher Alpenarena HS98)	N	(Austria) Stefan Rainer	(Austria) Timon-Pascal Kahofer	(Austria) Francisco Mörth	
6	(Note: Rescheduled from 10 September 2023)8 October 2023	(Austria) Villach (Villacher Alpenarena HS98)	N	(Austria) Stefan Rainer	(Austria) Timon-Pascal Kahofer	(Austria) Francisco Mörth	
7	14 October 2023	(Romania) Râșnov (Trambulina Valea Cărbunării HS97)	N	(Austria) Francisco Mörth	(Austria) Stefan Rainer	(Germany) Simon Steinbeißer	
8	15 October 2023	(Romania) Râșnov (Trambulina Valea Cărbunării HS97)	N	(Austria) Francisco Mörth	(Austria) Stefan Rainer	(United States) Jason Colby	
9	(Note: One round only)9 December 2023	(Switzerland) Kandersteg (Lötschberg-Schanze HS106)	N	(Austria) Marco Wörgötter	(Austria) Stephan Embacher	(Austria) Stefan Rainer	
10	10 December 2023	(Switzerland) Kandersteg (Lötschberg-Schanze HS106)	N	(Austria) Stephan Embacher	(Austria) Stefan Rainer	(Austria) Marco Wörgötter	
11	15 December 2023	(Norway) Notodden (Tveitanbakken HS98)	N	(Austria) Francisco Mörth	(Austria) Stefan Rainer	(Austria) Ulrich Wohlgenannt	
12	16 December 2023	(Norway) Notodden (Tveitanbakken HS98)	N	(Austria) Stefan Rainer	(Austria) Francisco Mörth	(Austria) Marco Wörgötter	
13	6 January 2024	(Sweden) Falun (Lugnet HS100)	N	(Austria) Ulrich Wohlgenannt	(Germany) Adrian Tittel	(Austria) Markus Ruptisch	
14	7 January 2024	(Sweden) Falun (Lugnet HS100)	N	(Austria) Ulrich Wohlgenannt	(Austria) Timon-Pascal Kahofer	(Austria) Markus Ruptisch (Germany) Adrian Tittel	
2024 Winter Youth Olympics (20–21 January • Gangwon, South Korea)
15	3 February 2024	(Poland) Szczyrk (Skalite HS104)	N	(Austria) Hannes Landerer	(Austria) Marco Wörgötter	(Austria) David Haagen (Austria) Stefan Rainer	
16	4 February 2024	(Poland) Szczyrk (Skalite HS104)	N	(Austria) Hannes Landerer	(Austria) Markus Rupitsch	(Austria) Marco Wörgötter	
2024 Nordic Junior World Ski Championships (5–11 February • Planica, Slovenia)
	23 February 2024	(Austria) Villach (Villacher Alpenarena HS98)	N	cancelled due to high temperatures and lack of snow			
	24 February 2024	(Austria) Villach (Villacher Alpenarena HS98)	N	cancelled due to high temperatures and lack of snow			
17	2 March 2024	(Germany) Oberhof (Kanzlersgrund HS100) (Note: Ice track and plastic cover (hybrid))	N	(Austria) Timon-Pascal Kahofer	(Austria) Ulrich Wohlgenannt	(Austria) Stefan Rainer	
18	3 March 2024	(Germany) Oberhof (Kanzlersgrund HS100)	N	(Austria) Ulrich Wohlgenannt	(Austria) Timon-Pascal Kahofer	(Germany) Finn Braun	
19	14 March 2023	(Poland) Zakopane (Wielka Krokiew HS140)	L	(Kazakhstan) Danil Vassilyev	(Germany) Martin Hamann	(Austria) Ulrich Wohlgenannt	
20	15 March 2023	(Poland) Zakopane (Wielka Krokiew HS140)	L	(Austria) Stefan Rainer	(Austria) Johannes Pölz	(Austria) Ulrich Wohlgenannt	
19th FIS Cup Overall (26 August 2023 – 15 March 2024)				(Austria) Stefan Rainer	(Austria) Francisco Mörth	(Austria) Timon-Pascal Kahofer	

=== Overall leaders ===
No.	Holder	Date gained	Place	Date forfeited	Place	Number of competitions
1.	(Austria) Niklas Bachlinger	26 August 2023	(Poland) Szczyrk	27 August 2023	(Poland) Szczyrk	1
2.	(Poland) Klemens Murańka	27 August 2023	(Poland) Szczyrk	16 September 2023	(Switzerland) Einsiedeln	1
3.	(Austria) Jonas Schuster	27 August 2023	(Poland) Szczyrk	16 September 2023	(Switzerland) Einsiedeln	1
4.	(Austria) Francisco Mörth	16 September 2023	(Switzerland) Einsiedeln	10 December 2023	(Switzerland) Kandersteg	7
5.	(Austria) Stefan Rainer	10 December 2023	(Switzerland) Kandersteg	Overall Winner		11

== Standings ==
=== Individual ===
Rank	after all 20 events	Points
	(Austria) Stefan Rainer	1175
2	(Austria) Francisco Mörth	759
3	(Austria) Timon-Pascal Kahofer	750
4	(Austria) Ulrich Wohlgenannt	742
5	(Austria) Markus Rupitsch	441
6	(Austria) Niklas Bachlinger	437
7	(Austria) Marco Wörgötter	405
8	(Austria) David Haagen	376
9	(Poland) Adam Niżnik	356
10	(Germany) Simon Steinbeißer	350

=== Nations Cup ===
Rank	after all 20 events	Points
1	Austria	7263
2	Poland	1941
3	Germany	1872
4	Slovenia	761
5	Norway	444
6	Romania	345
7	Switzerland	341
8	Kazakhstan	241
9	Finland	197
10	France	185

== Podium table by nation ==
Table showing the FIS Cup podium places (gold–1st place, silver–2nd place, bronze–3rd place) by the countries represented by the athletes.

Rank	Nation	Gold	Silver	Bronze	Total
1	Austria	17	17	14	48
2	Poland	1	0	2	3
3	Kazakhstan	1	0	0	1
3	Slovenia	1	0	0	1
5	Germany	0	2	5	7
6	Switzerland	0	1	0	1
7	United States	0	0	1	1
Totals (7 entries)		20	20	22	62
