= 2019–20 FIS Ski Jumping Alpen Cup =

Alpen Cup 2019/20
Discipline	Men	Women
Overall	(Austria) Marco Wörgötter	(Italy) Jessica Malsiner
Alpen Cup Tournament	—	(Italy) Jessica Malsiner

Competition
Edition	30th	12th
Locations	5	6
Individual	10	12
Cancelled	4	4
Rescheduled	2	

The 2019/20 FIS Ski Jumping Alpen Cup is the 30th Alpen Cup season in ski jumping for men and the 12th for ladies.

Other competitive circuits this season included the World Cup, Grand Prix, Continental Cup, FIS Cup and FIS Race.

== Calendar ==
=== Men ===
Season	Date	Place	Hill	Size	Winner	Second	Third	Ref.
1	13 September 2019	(Slovenia) Velenje	Grajski grič HS75	MH	(Austria) Marco Wörgötter	(Slovenia) Mark Hafnar	(Slovenia) Lovro Vodušek	
2	14 September 2019	(Slovenia) Velenje	Grajski grič HS75	MH	(Austria) Marco Wörgötter	(Slovenia) Lovro Vodušek	(Austria) Elias Medwed	
3	20 September 2019	(Italy) Predazzo	Trampolino dal Ben HS104	NH	(Austria) Marco Wörgötter	(France) Mathis Contamine	(Austria) Elias Medwed	
4	21 September 2019	(Italy) Predazzo	Trampolino dal Ben HS104	NH	(Austria) Marco Wörgötter	(Slovenia) Žak Mogel	(Austria) Peter Resinger	
5	20 December 2019	(Austria) Seefeld	Toni-Seelos-Olympiaschanze HS109	NH	(Slovenia) Žak Mogel	(Slovenia) Rok Masle	(Austria) Josef Ritzer	
6	21 December 2019	(Austria) Seefeld	Toni-Seelos-Olympiaschanze HS109	NH	(Austria) Marco Wörgötter	(France) Mathis Contamine (Austria) Markus Müller		
7	10 January 2020	(Germany) Oberstdorf	Schattenbergschanze HS137	LH	(Slovenia) Mark Hafnar	(Slovenia) Tjaš Grilc	(Switzerland) Dominik Peter	
8	11 January 2020	(Germany) Oberstdorf	Schattenbergschanze HS137	LH	(Slovenia) Mark Hafnar	(Slovenia) Tjaš Grilc	(Switzerland) Dominik Peter	
	7 February 2020	(Slovenia) Kranj	Bauhenk HS109	NH	rescheduled in Planica on 7–8 February 2020			
	8 February 2020	(Slovenia) Kranj	Bauhenk HS109	NH	rescheduled in Planica on 7–8 February 2020			
9	7 February 2020	(Slovenia) Planica	Normal hill HS102	NH	(Slovenia) Jernej Presečnik	(Slovenia) Jan Bombek	(Austria) Markus Müller	
10	8 February 2020	(Slovenia) Planica	Normal hill HS102	NH	(Slovenia) Jernej Presečnik	(Slovenia) Jan Bombek	(Slovenia) Gorazd Završnik	
	14 March 2020	(France) Chaux-Neuve	La Côté Feuillée HS64	MH	coronavirus pandemic			
	15 March 2020	(France) Chaux-Neuve	La Côté Feuillée HS64	MH	coronavirus pandemic			

=== Ladies ===
Season	Date	Place	Hill	Size	Winner	Second	Third	Ref.
1	4 August 2019	(Germany) Klingenthal	Mühlleithen Vogtlandschanzen HS85	MH	(Slovenia) Nika Prevc	(Italy) Daniela Dejori	(Austria) Sigrun Kleinrath	
2	5 August 2019	(Germany) Klingenthal	Mühlleithen Vogtlandschanzen HS85	MH	(Germany) Jenny Nowak	(Austria) Sigrun Kleinrath	(Austria) Silva Verbič	
3	7 August 2019	(Germany) Pöhla	Pöhlbachschanze HS66	MH	(Italy) Jessica Malsiner	(Italy) Annika Sieff	(Italy) Daniela Dejori	
4	8 August 2019	(Germany) Pöhla	Pöhlbachschanze HS66	MH	(Italy) Jessica Malsiner	(Italy) Daniela Dejori	(Austria) Vanessa Moharitsch	
5	9 August 2019	(Germany) Bischofsgrün	Ochsenkopfschanze HS71	MH	(Austria) Vanessa Moharitsch	(Italy) Annika Sieff	(Italy) Jessica Malsiner	
6	10 August 2019	(Germany) Bischofsgrün	Ochsenkopfschanze HS71	MH	(Germany) Lia Böhme	(Switzerland) Emely Torazza	(Austria) Julia Mühlbacher	
4th Alpen Cup Tournament Overall (4–10 August 2019)					(Italy) Jessica Malsiner	(Italy) Annika Sieff	(Italy) Daniela Dejori	
7	13 September 2019	(Slovenia) Velenje	Grajski grič HS75	MH	(Slovenia) Jerica Jesenko	(Germany) Michelle Göbel	(Slovenia) Nika Prevc	
8	14 September 2019	(Slovenia) Velenje	Grajski grič HS75	MH	(Slovenia) Jerica Jesenko	(Slovenia) Pia Mazi	(Slovenia) Lara Logar	
9	21 September 2019	(Italy) Predazzo	Trampolino dal Ben HS104	NH	(Austria) Lisa Hirner	(Italy) Jessica Malsiner	(Austria) Vanessa Moharitsch	
10	22 September 2019	(Italy) Predazzo	Trampolino dal Ben HS104	NH	(Italy) Jessica Malsiner	(Austria) Lisa Hirner	(Slovenia) Pia Mazi	
11	21 December 2019	(Austria) Seefeld	Toni-Seelos-Olympiaschanze HS109	NH	(Austria) Lisa Eder	(Slovenia) Nika Prevc	(Austria) Julia Mühlbacher	
12	22 December 2019	(Austria) Seefeld	Toni-Seelos-Olympiaschanze HS109	NH	(Austria) Lisa Eder	(Austria) Julia Mühlbacher	(Austria) Vanessa Moharitsch (France) Lucile Morat	
	1 February 2020	(Germany) Schonach	Langenwaldschanze HS98	NH	canceled			
	2 February 2020	(Germany) Schonach	Langenwaldschanze HS98	NH	canceled			
	14 March 2020	(France) Chaux-Neuve	La Côté Feuillée HS64	MH	coronavirus pandemic			
	15 March 2020	(France) Chaux-Neuve	La Côté Feuillée HS64	MH	coronavirus pandemic			

=== Mixed team ===
Season	Date	Place	Hill	Size	Winner	Second	Third	Ref.
1	15 September 2019	(Slovenia) Velenje	Grajski grič HS75	MH	Slovenia III Lara Logar; Mark Hafnar; Pia Mazi; Lovro Vodušek	Italy I Jessica Malsiner; Giovanni Bresadola; Annika Sieff; Francesco Cecon	Austria I Katharina Ellmauer; Elias Medwed; Hannah Wiegele; Marco Wörgötter	

== Standings ==
=== Men ===
Rank	after 10 events	Points
1	(Austria) Marco Wörgötter	545
2	(Slovenia) Mark Hafnar	368
3	(Slovenia) Žak Mogel	335
4	(Slovenia) Jan Bombek	330
5	(Slovenia) Lovro Vodušek	329

=== Ladies ===
Rank	after 12 events	Points
1	(Italy) Jessica Malsiner	715
2	(Italy) Annika Sieff	545
3	(Austria) Vanessa Moharitsch	462
4	(Austria) Julia Mühlbacher	438
5	(Slovenia) Nika Prevc	359

=== Ladies' Alpen Cup Tournament ===
Rank	after 6 events	Points
1	(Italy) Jessica Malsiner	1294.7
2	(Italy) Daniela Dejori	1279.2
3	(Italy) Annika Sieff	1272.5
4	(Austria) Julia Mühlbacher	1264.5
5	(Austria) Vanessa Moharitsch	1244.2
