= Sergey Tkachenko =

Kazakhstani ski jumper (born 1999)

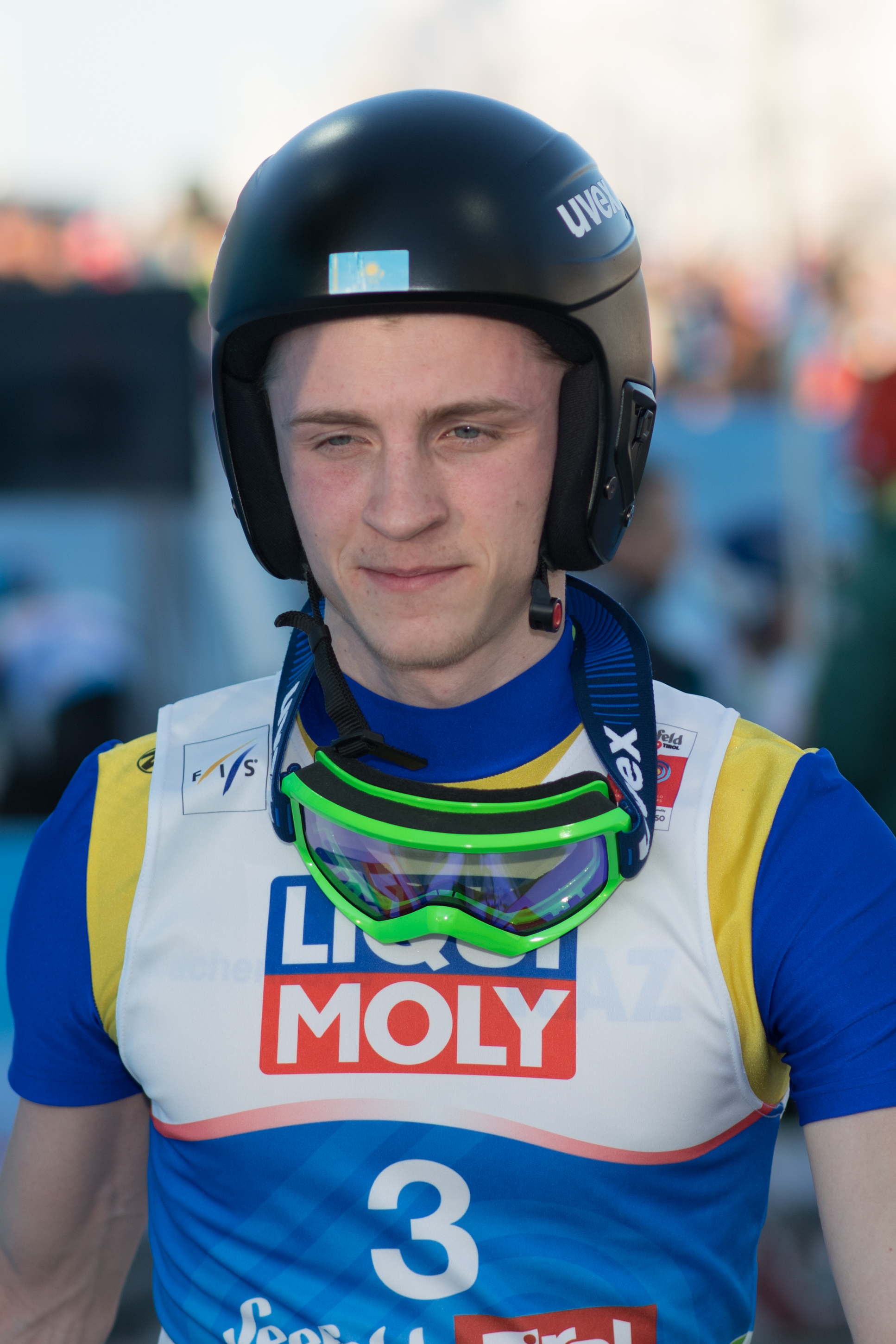
- Sergey Tkachenko in 2019

Personal information
- Nationality: Kazakhstan
- Born: 8 June 1999 (age 27) Ridder, Kazakhstan
- Height: 167 cm (5 ft 6 in)

Sport
- Sport: Skiing
- Club: Ski Club VKO

World Cup career
- Seasons: 2017–present
- Indiv. starts: 29
- Team starts: 7

Achievements and titles
- Personal bests: 199.5 m (655 ft) NR; Vikersund, 15 March 2019
Medal record
Men's ski jumping
World Junior Championship
Bronze medal – third place	2019 Lahti	Individual NH
- Updated on 6 March 2022

Sergey Tkachenko (Russian: Сергей Ткаченко; born 8 June 1999) is a Kazakhstani ski jumper. He competed in two events at the 2018 Winter Olympics.

== Summer world record ==
On 11 July 2018 at the opening event of Burabay Ski Jumps hill in Shchuchinsk, Kazakhstan he set the summer world record distance at 151 metres (495 ft), longest standing on plastic mat.

== World Cup ==
=== Standings ===
Season	Overall	4H	SF	RA	W6	T5	P7
2016/17	—	—	—	77	N/A	N/A	N/A
2017/18	—	—	—	—	—	—	—
2019/20	56	51	—	45	—	38	N/A
2020/21	—	—	—	N/A	—	N/A	—
2021/22				67	N/A	N/A	

=== Individual starts (29) ===
did not compete (–); failed to qualify (q)
Season	1	2	3	4	5	6	7	8	9	10	11	12	13	14	15	16	17	18	19	20	21	22	23	24	25	26	27	28	29	Points
2016/17	Kuusamo	Kuusamo	Klingenthal	Lillehammer	Lillehammer	Engelberg	Engelberg	Oberstdorf	Garmisch-Partenkirchen	Innsbruck	Bischofshofen	Wisła	Wisła	Zakopane	Willingen	Oberstdorf	Oberstdorf	Sapporo	Sapporo	Pyeongchang	Pyeongchang	Oslo	Trondheim	Vikersund	Planica	Planica				0
2016/17	–	–	–	–	–	–	–	–	–	–	–	q	q	q	–	–	–	–	–	q	q	q	–	–	–	–				0
2017/18	Wisła	Kuusamo	Nizhny Tagil	Nizhny Tagil	Titisee-Neustadt	Engelberg	Engelberg	Oberstdorf	Garmisch-Partenkirchen	Innsbruck	Bischofshofen	Tauplitz	Zakopane	Willingen	Willingen	Lahti	Oslo	Lillehammer	Trondheim	Vikersund	Planica	Planica								0
2017/18	q	q	–	–	–	q	q	–	–	–	–	–	–	–	–	–	–	–	–	–	–	–								0
2018/19	Wisła	Kuusamo	Kuusamo	Nizhny Tagil	Nizhny Tagil	Engelberg	Engelberg	Oberstdorf	Garmisch-Partenkirchen	Innsbruck	Bischofshofen	Predazzo	Predazzo	Zakopane	Sapporo	Sapporo	Oberstdorf	Oberstdorf	Oberstdorf	Lahti	Willingen	Willingen	Oslo	Lillehammer	Trondheim	Vikersund	Planica	Planica		0
2018/19	q	–	–	q	q	q	q	q	q	47	q	q	33	40	–	–	–	–	–	–	–	–	47	q	41	35	q	–		0
2019/20	Wisła	Kuusamo	Nizhny Tagil	Nizhny Tagil	Klingenthal	Engelberg	Engelberg	Oberstdorf	Garmisch-Partenkirchen	Innsbruck	Bischofshofen	Val di Fiemme	Val di Fiemme	Titisee-Neustadt	Titisee-Neustadt	Zakopane	Sapporo	Sapporo	Willingen	Tauplitz	Tauplitz	Râșnov	Râșnov	Lahti	Lahti	Oslo	Lillehammer			13
2019/20	q	–	39	46	q	32	24	35	q	q	35	41	29	37	35	42	–	–	–	–	–	32	41	40	40	q	27			13
2020–21	Wisła	Ruka	Ruka	Nizhny Tagil	Nizhny Tagil	Engelberg	Engelberg	Oberstdorf	Garmisch-Partenkirchen	Innsbruck	Bischofshofen	Titisee-Neustadt	Titisee-Neustadt	Zakopane	Lahti	Willingen	Willingen	Klingenthal	Klingenthal	Szczyrk	Szczyrk	Râșnov	Planica	Planica	Planica					0
2020–21	–	–	–	–	–	–	–	–	–	–	–	–	–	–	–	–	–	50	48	q	47	–	q	–	–					0
2021/22	Nizhny Tagil	Nizhny Tagil	Ruka	Ruka	Wisła	Klingenthal	Klingenthal	Engelberg	Engelberg	Oberstdorf	Garmisch-Partenkirchen	Bischofshofen	Bischofshofen	Bischofshofen	Zakopane	Titisee-Neustadt	Titisee-Neustadt	Willingen	Willingen	Lahti	Lahti	Lillehammer	Oslo	Oslo	Oberstdorf	Oberstdorf	Planica	Planica		0
2021/22	–	–	–	–	q	49	31	q	46	q	q	q	q	q	q	–	–	–	–	48	q	q	q	–						0
