= Burabay Ski Jumps =

Ski jumping complex in Burabay, Kazakhstan

Coordinates: 52°56′36″N 70°14′09″E

National Ski Center
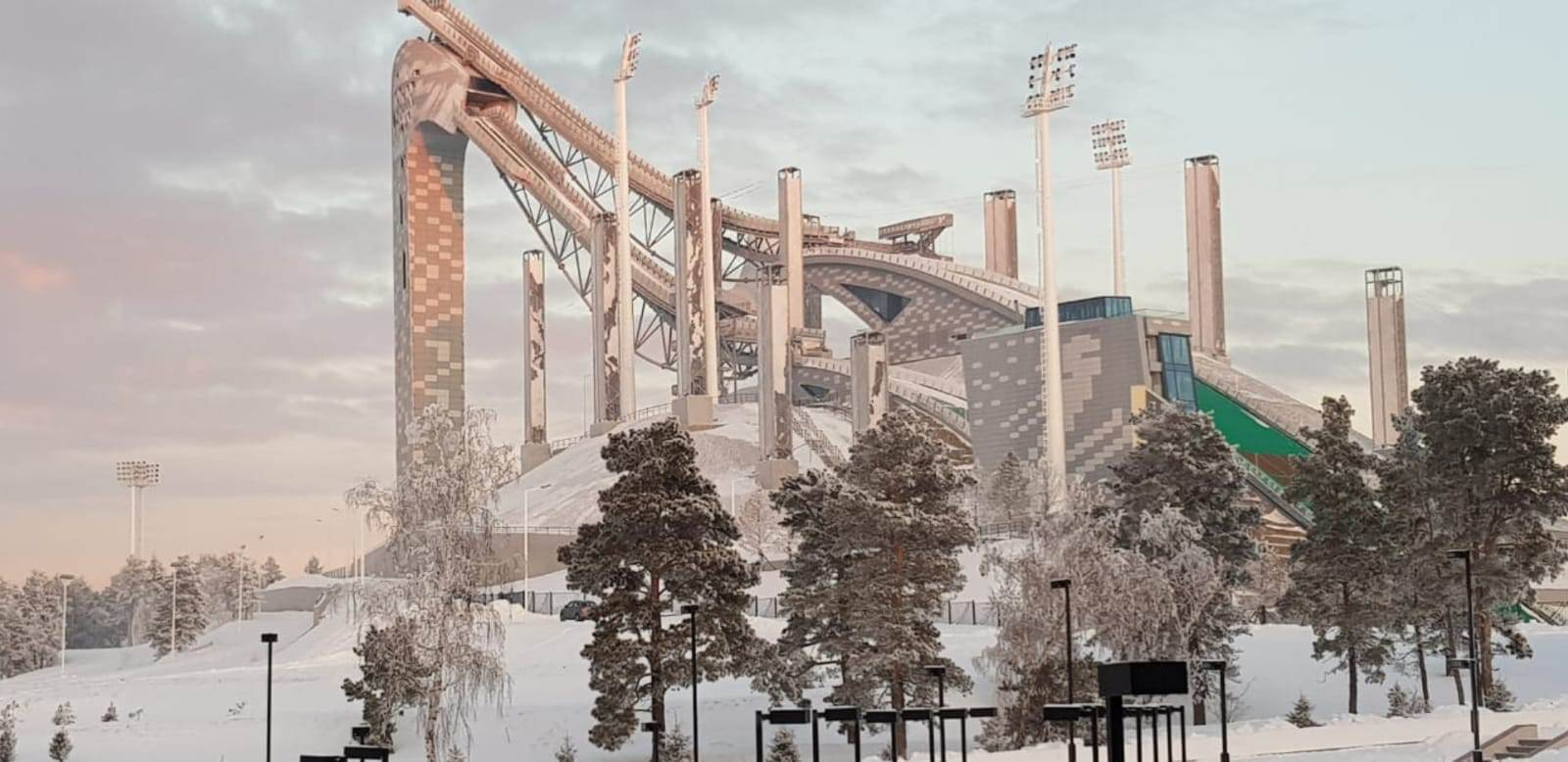
- Location: Shchuchinsk, Kazakhstan
- Opened: 11 July 2018

Size
- K–point: 90, 125 m
- Hill size: 99, 140 m
- Longest jump (unofficial / fall): 154 m (505 ft)* (Slovenia) Jurij Tepeš (opening jump, 11 July 2018)
- Hill record: Summer world record: 151 m (495 ft) (Kazakhstan) Sergey Tkachenko (opening jump, 11 July 2018) --------------------------------------- Competition record: 144.5 m (474 ft) (Austria) Maximilian Lienher (Continental Cup, 13 July 2019) --------------------------------------- 101 m (331 ft) (Austria) Maximilian Lienher (FIS Cup, 12 July 2019) --------------------------------------- 98.5 m (323 ft) (Norway) Gyda Westvold Hansen (Continental Cup, 14 July 2019)

The National Ski Center is a modern ski jumping complex with one normal and one large hill in Shchuchinsk, Kazakhstan. It is located in Burabay District in the northern part of the country.

== History ==
Construction started in 2009 and the complex was officially opened by Kazakh president Nursultan Nazarbayev in July 2018. The first official competition took place on 11 July 2019 on the normal hill at the FIS Cup competition.

== Longest jump on plastic ever ==
=== Invalid World Record ===
On 11 July 2018 at the opening event, Slovenian ski jumper Jurij Tepeš touched the ground at a distance of 154 metres (505 ft). This was a test jump, and so was not officially valid. However, it is the longest summer jump in the history of plastic mat ski jumping, a material which has been in use since 1954.

=== Summer world record ===
On 11 July 2018 at the opening event, Kazakh ski jumper Sergey Tkachenko set the summer world record distance at 151 metres (495 ft).

== Competitions ==
=== Men ===
Date	Hillsize	Event	Winner	Second	Third
11 July 2019	HS99	FC	(Austria) Maximilian Lienher	(Germany) Luca Roth	(Slovenia) Cene Prevc
12 July 2019	HS99	FC	(Austria) Maximilian Lienher	(Slovenia) Cene Prevc	(Germany) Luca Roth
13 July 2019	HS140	CC	(Austria) Maximilian Lienher	(Japan) Naoki Nakamura	(Kazakhstan) Sergey Tkachenko
14 July 2019	HS140	CC	(Japan) Keiichi Satō	(Japan) Naoki Nakamura	(South Korea) Choi Heung-chul

=== Ladies ===
Date	Hillsize	Event	Winner	Second	Third
11 July 2019	HS99	FC	(Kazakhstan) Valentina Sderzhikova	(Russia) Kristina Prokopieva	(Russia) Aleksandra Barantceva
12 July 2019	HS99	FC	(Russia) Irma Machinya	(Kazakhstan) Valentina Sderzhikova	(Russia) Kristina Prokopieva
13 July 2019	HS99	CC	(Norway) Gyda Westvold Hansen	(Kazakhstan) Veronika Shishkina	(Kazakhstan) Valentina Sderzhikova
14 July 2019	HS99	CC	(Norway) Gyda Westvold Hansen	(Russia) Kristina Prokopieva	(Kazakhstan) Valentina Sderzhikova

== See also ==
- Shchuchinsk
- Burabay District
