= Maximilian Ortner =

Austrian ski jumper (born 2002)

Medal record

Men's ski jumping

Representing Austria

World Championships
Silver medal – second place	2025 Trondheim	Team LH

Maximilian Ortner (born 4 June 2002) is an Austrian ski jumper.

Ortner's FIS Ski Jumping World Cup debut took place in Bischofshofen on 6 January 2023 where he finished 28th. His achieved his first career podium in World Cup on 23 November 2024 in Lillehammer, where he placed third. He also won a silver medal at the Men's team large hill event with the Austrian team at the FIS Nordic World Ski Championships 2025.
