= Luca Roth =

German ski jumper (born 2000)

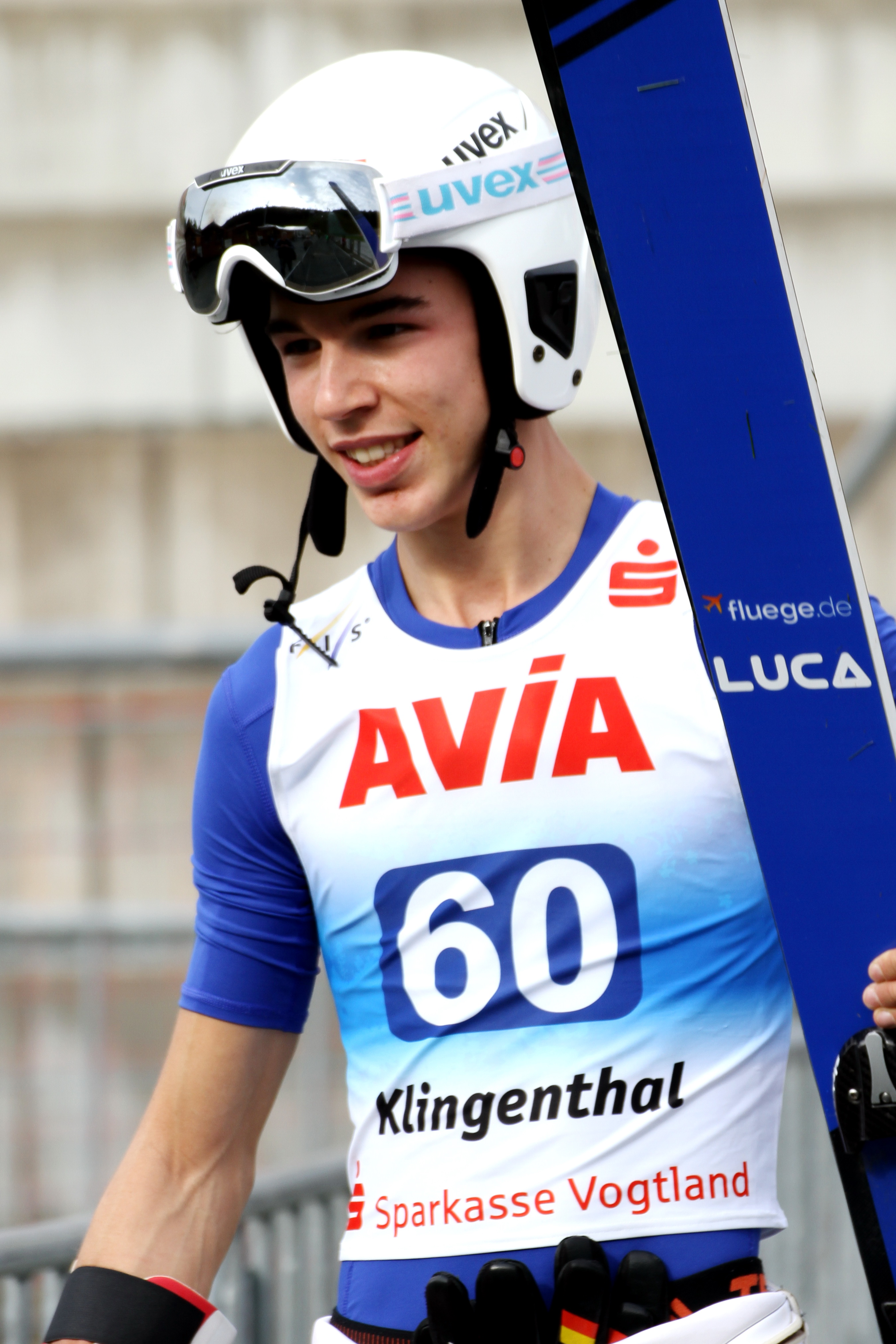

Personal information
- Nationality: Germany
- Born: 14 April 2000 (age 26) Meßstetten, Germany
- Height: 1.86 m (6 ft 1 in)

Sport
- Sport: Skiing
- Club: SV Meßstetten

World Cup career
- Indiv. starts: 7

Achievements and titles
- Personal bests: 201.0 m (659.4 ft); Oberstdorf, 17 March 2022

Luca Roth (born 14 April 2000) is a German ski jumper and representative of the club SV Meßstetten. Silver individual medalist at the 2019 Nordic Junior World Ski Championships, three-time team medalist (2019–20).

== Career ==
Roth starts for SV Meßstetten. He made his debut on 17 January 2015 in Oberwiesenthal in the Alpencup, where he finished 54th. In September 2016, Roth competed for the first time in the FIS Cup in Hinterzarten, where he finished 23rd and 16th. Since then, further participations in both competition series followed.

After strong performances in the Alpine Cup, he made his debut on 18 August 2017 in the Continental Cup in Szczyrk, where he finished 11th.

He finished 11th at the 2017 German Championships in Oberwiesenthal. On 27 December 2018, he jumped into the top ten of a Continental Cup competition at the Vogtland Arena in Klingenthal for the first time and finished sixth in the series on the following day. At the 2019 Nordic Junior Ski World Championships in Lahti, Finland, he won the World Team Jumping Championship (together with Kilian Märkl, Philipp Raimund and Constantin Schmid), second place in individual jumping and third place in the mixed team competition (together with Agnes Reisch, Selina Freitag and Constantin Schmid). a complete set of medals.

Roth attended the ski boarding school Furtwangen, where he graduated in summer 2018. He trains at the Hinterzarten base.
