= Skalite (ski jumping hill) =

Ski jumping hills in Szczyrk, Poland

Coordinates: 49.7235°N 19.0208°E

Skalite hills
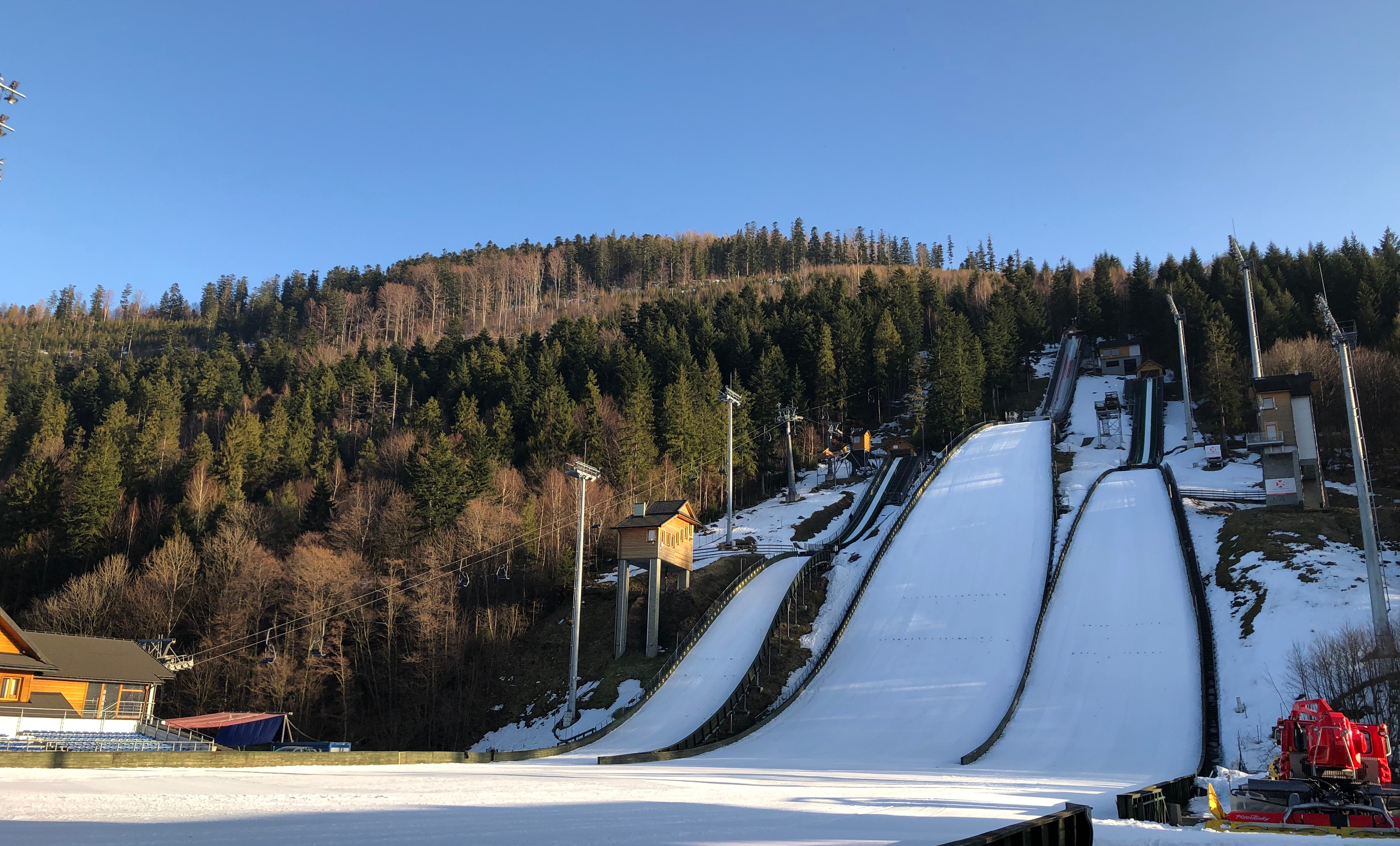
- Location: Szczyrk, Poland
- Opened: 1937
- Renovated: 1953, 2007

Size
- K–point: K-95
- Hill size: HS 104
- Hill record: 103,5 m (331.4 ft) (Finland) Eetu Nousiainen (17 January 2024)

Skocznia Skalite im. Beskidzkich Olimpijczyków (Beskid Olympians Skalite Ski Jumping Hill) is a complex of three Polish ski jumping hills located in Szczyrk – on the northern slope of the Skalite mountain (864 m), at an altitude of 620 m.

It includes the K95 normal hill and smaller facilities K70 and K40. On the largest hill most often takes place FIS Cup competitions.

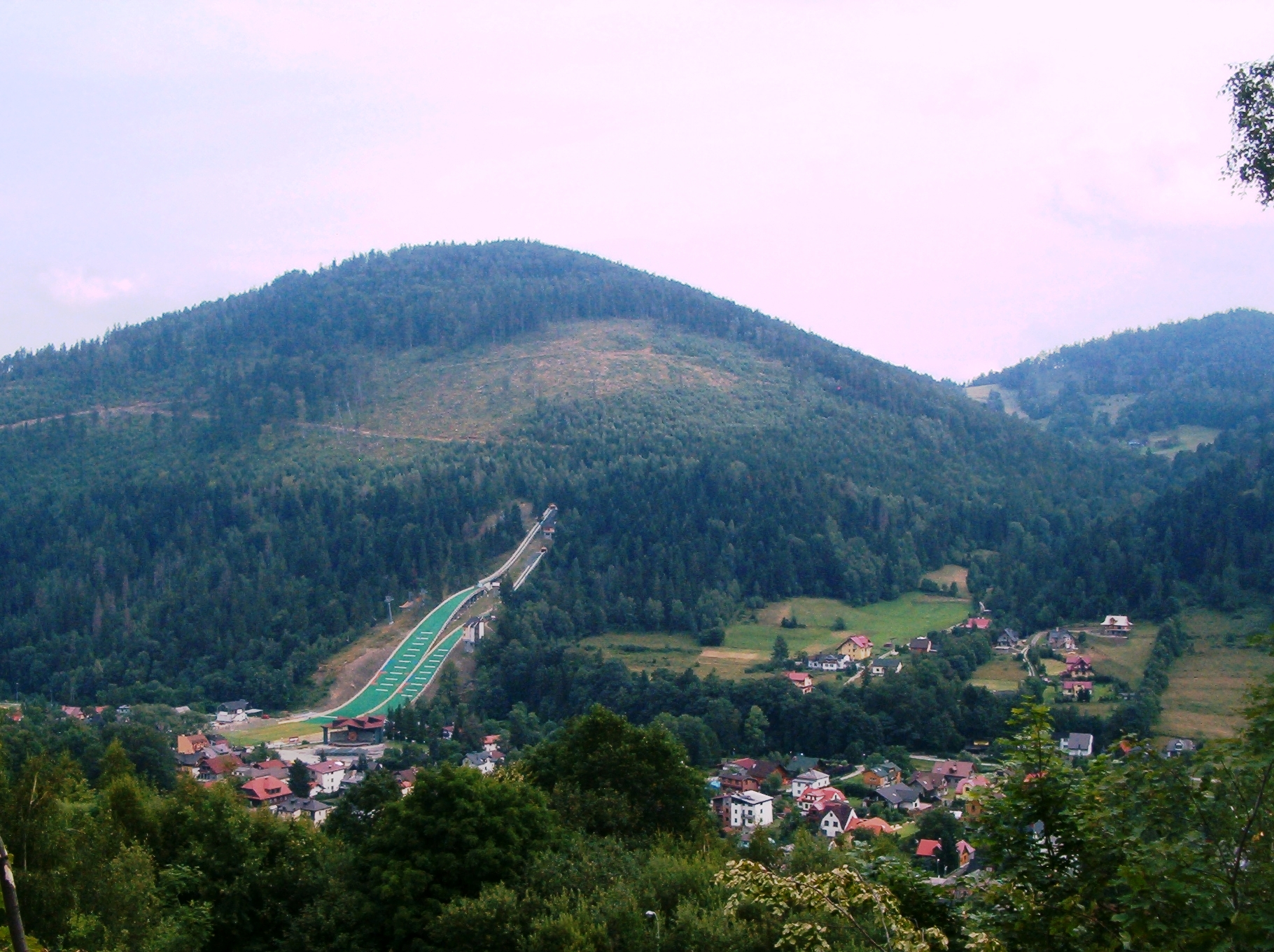

== Hill parameters ==
- Construction point: 95 m
- Hill size (HS): 104 m
- Official hill record: 103,5 m – (Finland) Eetu Nousiainen (17 January 2024)
- Hill record: 116.0 m – (Poland) Krzysztof Leja (1 March 2011)
- Inrun length: 82.5 m
- Inrun angle: 34.8°
- Take-off length: 6 m
- Take-off angle: 11°
- Take-off height: 2.5 m
- Landing angle: 33.7°
- Average speed: 88.5 km/h

== History ==
The history of the Skalite ski jump in Szczyrk dates back to 1937, when the first competition was held there. For many years, Skalite was the arena of important events, both national and international. The most important series, which took place in Skalite, was the Beskid Mountains Cup.

An important moment was awarding of the organization of the Junior World Championships in 2008 to Szczyrk. On this occasion, at the turn of 2007 and 2008, the ski jump was rebuilt at a record pace. However, the championship was postponed to Zakopane due to lack of snow, but the new hill with a construction point located at 95 meters was opened on the occasion of the FIS Cup competition.

In July 2011 was held the Summer Grand Prix competition. Szczyrk was also on the provisional World Cup calendar for the 2015/2016 season, but the competition did not take place.

== World Cup ==
In the 2023–24 season, the inaugural world cup competition was scheduled at the Skalite ski jumping hill on 17 January as part of the PolSKI Tour. However, the competition was cancelled after the 40th jumper due to strong wind.
