= 2014–15 FIS Ski Jumping Continental Cup =

Ski-jumping competition series

FIS Ski Jumping Continental Cup 2014/15
Discipline	Men	Women
Summer	(Poland) Jakub Wolny	(Japan) Sara Takanashi
Winter	(Slovenia) Anže Semenič	(Norway) Anette Sagen

Competition
Edition	13th (Summer), 24th (Winter)	7th (Summer), 11th (Winter)
Locations	7 (Summer), 12 (Winter)	1 (Summer), 2 (Winter)
Individual	14 (Summer), 26 (Winter)	2 (Summer), 4 (Winter)
Cancelled	— (Summer), 3 (Winter)	— (Summer), — (Winter)
Rescheduled	— (Summer), 3 (Winter)	— (Summer), 1 (Winter)

The 2014/15 FIS Ski Jumping Continental Cup was the 24th in a row (22nd official) Continental Cup winter season and the 13th official summer season in ski jumping for men.

This was also the 11th winter and the 7th summer season for women. Sara Takanashi won summer and Anette Sagen winter overall.

Other competitions were World Cup, Grand Prix and Alpen Cup.

== Men's Summer ==
Individual men's events in the CC history

Total	F	L	N	Winners
143	—	76	67

after large hill event in Trondheim (28 September 2014)

=== Calendar ===
All	No.	Date	Place (Hill)	Size	Winner	Second	Third	Overall leader	R.
130	1	5 July 2014	(Slovenia) Kranj (Bauhenk HS109)	N _{064}	(Slovenia) Peter Prevc	(Slovenia) Cene Prevc	(Slovenia) Andraž Pograjc	(Slovenia) Peter Prevc	
131	2	6 July 2014	(Slovenia) Kranj (Bauhenk HS109)	N _{065}	(Slovenia) Peter Prevc	(Slovenia) Cene Prevc	(Slovenia) Miran Zupančič	(Slovenia) Peter Prevc	
132	3	1 August 2014	(Poland) Wisła (Malinka HS134)	L _{067}	(Slovenia) Cene Prevc	(Poland) Piotr Żyła	(Slovenia) Miran Zupančič	(Slovenia) Cene Prevc	
133	4	2 August 2014	(Poland) Wisła (Malinka HS134)	L _{068}	(Poland) Piotr Żyła	(Slovenia) Mitja Mežnar	(Poland) Jan Ziobro	(Slovenia) Cene Prevc	
134	5	16 August 2014	(Finland) Kuopio (Puijo HS127)	L _{069}	(Slovenia) Cene Prevc	(Slovenia) Miran Zupančič	(Germany) Stephan Leyhe	(Slovenia) Cene Prevc	
135	6	17 August 2014	(Finland) Kuopio (Puijo HS127)	L _{070}	(Slovenia) Cene Prevc	(Slovenia) Miran Zupančič	(Finland) Olli Muotka	(Slovenia) Cene Prevc	
136	7	29 August 2014	(Czech Republic) Frenštát (Areal Horečky HS106)	N _{066}	(Austria) Markus Schiffner	(Germany) Danny Queck	(Slovenia) Jure Šinkovec	(Slovenia) Cene Prevc	
137	8	30 August 2014	(Czech Republic) Frenštát (Areal Horečky HS106)	N _{067}	(Slovenia) Jure Šinkovec	(Czech Republic) Jakub Janda	(Germany) Pius Paschke	(Slovenia) Cene Prevc	
138	9	13 September 2014	(Germany) Klingenthal (Vogtland Arena HS140)	L _{071}	(Slovenia) Anže Lanišek	(Slovenia) Peter Prevc	(Germany) Markus Eisenbichler	(Slovenia) Cene Prevc	
139	10	14 September 2014	(Germany) Klingenthal (Vogtland Arena HS140)	L _{072}	(Poland) Jakub Wolny	(Slovenia) Peter Prevc	(Austria) Wolfgang Loitzl	(Slovenia) Cene Prevc	
140	11	20 September 2014	(Austria) Stams (Brunnentalschanze HS115)	L _{073}	(Poland) Jakub Wolny	(Germany) Michael Neumayer	(Slovenia) Miran Zupančič	(Slovenia) Cene Prevc	
141	12	21 September 2014	(Austria) Stams (Brunnentalschanze HS115)	L _{074}	(Poland) Jakub Wolny	(Slovenia) Anže Lanišek	(Germany) Pius Paschke	(Poland) Jakub Wolny	
142	13	27 September 2014	(Norway) Trondheim (Granåsen HS140)	L _{075}	(Slovenia) Anže Lanišek	(Germany) Michael Neumayer	(Norway) Kenneth Gangnes	(Poland) Jakub Wolny	
143	14	28 September 2014	(Norway) Trondheim (Granåsen HS140)	L _{076}	(Germany) Karl Geiger	(Germany) Markus Eisenbichler	(Czech Republic) Antonín Hájek	(Poland) Jakub Wolny	
13th FIS Summer Continental Cup Men's Overall (5 July – 28 September 2014)					(Poland) Jakub Wolny	(Slovenia) Cene Prevc	(Slovenia) Miran Zupančič	Summer Overall	

==== Overall ====
Rank	after 14 events	Points
1	(Poland) Jakub Wolny	515
2	(Slovenia) Cene Prevc	482
3	(Slovenia) Miran Zupančič	461
4	(Slovenia) Peter Prevc	439
5	(Germany) Danny Queck	364
6	(Slovenia) Anže Lanišek	346
7	(Slovenia) Andraž Pograjc	322
8	(Slovenia) Jure Šinkovec	318
9	(Germany) Michael Neumayer	279
10	(Germany) Stephan Leyhe	271

== Men's Winter ==
Individual men's events in the CC history

Total	F	L	N	Winners
799	4	402	393

after large hill event in Nizhny Tagil (15 March 2015)

=== Calendar ===
All	No.	Date	Place (Hill)	Size	Winner	Second	Third	Overall leader	R.
774	1	12 December 2014	(Norway) Rena (Renabakkene HS139)	L _{380}	(Germany) Stephan Leyhe	(Norway) J. André Forfang	(Switzerland) Killian Peier	(Germany) Stephan Leyhe	
		13 December 2014	(Norway) Rena (Renabakkene HS139)	L _{cnx}	cancelled due to strong wind and rescheduled to the next day			—	
775	2	(Note: Men's large hill cancelled competition in Rena (13 December) was rescheduled on 14 December (1st event of the day).)14 December 2014	(Norway) Rena (Renabakkene HS139)	L _{381}	(Austria) Manuel Fettner	(Norway) J. André Forfang	(Austria) Manuel Poppinger	(Norway) J. André Forfang	
776	3	14 December 2014	(Norway) Rena (Renabakkene HS139)	L _{382}	(Norway) J. André Forfang	(Slovenia) Anže Semenič	(Germany) Stephan Leyhe (Norway) Phillip Sjøen	(Norway) J. André Forfang	
		20 December 2014	(Germany) Garmisch-Pa (Gr. Olympiaschanze HS140)	L _{cnx}	cancelled due to warm weather and lack of snow			—	
		21 December 2014	(Germany) Garmisch-Pa (Gr. Olympiaschanze HS140)	L _{cnx}	cancelled due to warm weather and lack of snow			—	
777	4	27 December 2014	(Switzerland) Engelberg (Gross-Titlis-Schanze HS137)	L _{383}	(Slovenia) Rok Justin	(Poland) Bartłomiej Kłusek	(Norway) Tom Hilde	(Norway) J. André Forfang	
778	5	28 December 2014	(Switzerland) Engelberg (Gross-Titlis-Schanze HS137)	L _{384}	(Norway) Tom Hilde	(Slovenia) Miran Zupančič	(Slovenia) Rok Justin	(Norway) J. André Forfang	
779	6	(Note: Men's large hill competition in Wisła (10 January) had only one round due to heavy rain.)10 January 2015	(Poland) Wisła (Malinka HS134)	L _{385}	(Poland) Jan Ziobro	(Poland) Klemens Murańka	(Germany) Andreas Wank	(Norway) J. André Forfang	
780	7	(Note: Men's large hill competition in Wisła (11 January) had only one round due to strong wind.)11 January 2015	(Poland) Wisła (Malinka HS134)	L _{386}	(Poland) Maciej Kot	(Poland) Klemens Murańka	(Poland) Dawid Kubacki	(Norway) J. André Forfang	
781	8	16 January 2015	(Japan) Sapporo (Miyanomori HS100) (Okurayama HS134)	N _{391}	(Slovenia) Miran Zupančič	(Norway) Kenneth Gangnes	(Austria) Clemens Aigner	(Slovenia) Miran Zupančič	
782	9	17 January 2015	(Japan) Sapporo (Miyanomori HS100) (Okurayama HS134)	L _{387}	(Norway) Phillip Sjøen	(United States) William Rhoads	(Norway) Kenneth Gangnes	(Norway) Kenneth Gangnes	
783	10	(Note: Men's large hill competition in Sapporo (18 January), 2nd event of the day only one round due to bad weather.)18 January 2015	(Japan) Sapporo (Miyanomori HS100) (Okurayama HS134)	L _{388}	(Norway) Manuel Poppinger	(Slovenia) Anže Semenič (Slovenia) Tomaž Naglič		(Norway) Kenneth Gangnes	
784	11	24 January 2015	(Slovenia) Planica (Bloudkova velikanka HS139)	L _{389}	(Slovenia) Anže Lanišek	(Slovenia) Tomaž Naglič	(Norway) J. Ødegård Bjøreng	(Slovenia) Anže Semenič	
785	12	(Note: Men's large hill competition in Planica (25 January) had only one round.)25 January 2015	(Slovenia) Planica (Bloudkova velikanka HS139)	L _{390}	(Poland) Klemens Murańka	(Slovenia) Jaka Hvala	(Slovenia) Andraž Pograjc	(Slovenia) Miran Zupančič	
786	13	31 January 2015	(Poland) Zakopane (Wielka Krokiew HS134)	L _{391}	(Poland) Dawid Kubacki	(Germany) Daniel Wenig	(Austria) Ulrich Wohlgenannt	(Slovenia) Miran Zupančič	
787	14	1 February 2015	(Poland) Zakopane (Wielka Krokiew HS134)	L _{392}	(Norway) A. Pedersen Rønsen	(Austria) Ulrich Wohlgenannt	(Poland) Dawid Kubacki	(Slovenia) Miran Zupančič	
788	15	7 February 2015	(Germany) Brotterode (Inselbergschanze HS117)	L _{393}	(Poland) Krzysztof Biegun	(Norway) Robert Johansson	(Norway) Joachim Hauer	(Slovenia) Miran Zupančič	
		8 February 2015	(Germany) Brotterode (Inselbergschanze HS117)	L _{cnx}	cancelled due to strong wind (rescheduled in Titisee-Neustadt on 28 February)			—	
789	16	14 February 2015	(Finland) Lahti (Salpausselkä HS130)	L _{394}	(Norway) H. Egner Granerud	(Slovenia) Anže Lanišek	(Finland) Janne Ahonen	(Slovenia) Miran Zupančič	
790	17	15 February 2015	(Finland) Lahti (Salpausselkä HS130)	L _{395}	(Slovenia) Anže Lanišek	(Poland) Maciej Kot	(Germany) Karl Geiger	(Slovenia) Miran Zupančič	
		20 February 2015	(United States) Iron Mountain (Pine Mountain HS133)	L _{cnx}	cancelled due to heavy snowfall and rescheduled on the next day			—	
791	18	(Note: Men's large hill cancelled competition in Iron Mountain (20 February) was rescheduled on 21 February (1st event of the day).)21 February 2015	(United States) Iron Mountain (Pine Mountain HS133)	L _{396}	(Slovenia) Anže Semenič	(Poland) Maciej Kot	(Austria) Ulrich Wohlgenannt	(Slovenia) Miran Zupančič	
792	19	21 February 2015	(United States) Iron Mountain (Pine Mountain HS133)	L _{397}	(Germany) Andreas Wank	(Slovenia) Anže Semenič	(Norway) Joachim Hauer	(Slovenia) Anže Semenič	
		22 February 2015	(United States) Iron Mountain (Pine Mountain HS133)	L _{cnx}	cancelled due to strong wind			—	
793	20	(Note: Men's large hill cancelled competition in Brotterode (8 February) was rescheduled Titisee-Neustadt (28 February) at 1st event of the day.)28 February 2015	(Germany) Titisee-Neustadt (Hochfirstschanze HS142)	L _{398}	(Norway) Kenneth Gangnes	(Slovenia) Jaka Hvala	(Norway) Daniel-André Tande	(Slovenia) Anže Semenič	
794	21	28 February 2015	(Germany) Titisee-Neustadt (Hochfirstschanze HS142)	L _{399}	(Norway) Daniel-André Tande	(Germany) Andreas Wank	(Germany) Pius Paschke	(Slovenia) Anže Semenič	
795	22	1 March 2015	(Germany) Titisee-Neustadt (Hochfirstschanze HS142)	L _{400}	(Norway) H. Egner Granerud	(Germany) Stephan Leyhe	(Germany) Andreas Wank (Poland) Krzysztof Biegun	(Slovenia) Anže Semenič	
796	23	7 March 2015	(Austria) Seefeld (Toni-Seelos HS109)	N _{392}	(Poland) Dawid Kubacki	(Poland) Aleksander Zniszczoł	(Norway) Daniel-André Tande	(Slovenia) Anže Semenič	
797	24	8 March 2015	(Austria) Seefeld (Toni-Seelos HS109)	N _{393}	(Norway) Daniel-André Tande	(Norway) Kenneth Gangnes	(Poland) Dawid Kubacki	(Slovenia) Anže Semenič	
798	25	14 March 2015	(Russia) Nizhny Tagil (Tramplin Stork HS140)	L _{401}	(Slovenia) Anže Semenič	(Poland) Andrzej Stękała	(Norway) Daniel-André Tande	(Slovenia) Anže Semenič	
799	26	15 March 2015	(Russia) Nizhny Tagil (Tramplin Stork HS140)	L _{402}	(Slovenia) Anže Semenič	(Germany) Stephan Leyhe	(Norway) Tom Hilde	(Slovenia) Anže Semenič	
24th FIS Winter Continental Cup Men's Overall (12 December 2014 – 15 March 2015)					(Slovenia) Anže Semenič	(Norway) Kenneth Gangnes	(Slovenia) Miran Zupančič	Winter Overall	

==== Overall ====
Rank	after 26 events	Points
1	(Slovenia) Anže Semenič	901
2	(Norway) Kenneth Gangnes	638
3	(Slovenia) Miran Zupančič	607
4	(Germany) Andreas Wank	602
5	(Slovenia) Jaka Hvala	591
6	(Germany) Stephan Leyhe	502
7	(Austria) Ulrich Wohlgenannt	471
8	(Poland) Dawid Kubacki	466
9	(Slovenia) Anže Lanišek	463
10	(Norway) Tom Hilde	433

== Women's Summer ==
Individual women's events in the CC history

Total	L	N	M	Winners
42	—	31	11

after normal hill event in Trondheim (28 September 2014)

=== Calendar ===
All	No.	Date	Place (Hill)	Size	Winner	Second	Third	Overall leader	R.
41	1	27 September 2014	(Norway) Trondheim (Granåsen HS105)	N _{030}	(Japan) Sara Takanashi	(United States) Sarah Hendrickson	(Norway) Maren Lundby	(Japan) Sara Takanashi	
42	2	28 September 2014	(Norway) Trondheim (Granåsen HS105)	N _{031}	(Japan) Sara Takanashi	(United States) Sarah Hendrickson	(France) Coline Mattel	(Japan) Sara Takanashi	
7th FIS Summer Continental Cup Women's Overall (27 – 28 September 2014)					(Japan) Sara Takanashi	(United States) Sarah Hendrickson	(France) Coline Mattel	Summer Overall	

==== Overall ====
Rank	after 2 events	Points
1	(Japan) Sara Takanashi	200
2	(United States) Sarah Hendrickson	160
3	(France) Coline Mattel	110
4	(France) Julia Clair	86
5	(Finland) Julia Kykkänen	74
	(Finland) Julia Kykkänen	74
7	(United States) Nita Englund	69
8	(Italy) Evelyn Insam	68
9	(Russia) Anastasiya Gladysheva	62
10	(United States) Tara Geraghty-Moats	48

== Women's Winter ==
Individual women's events in the CC history

Total	L	N	M	Winners
144	9	120	15

after normal hill event in Falun (18 January 2015)

=== Calendar ===
All	No.	Date	Place (Hill)	Size	Winner	Second	Third	Overall leader	R.
141	1	12 December 2014	(Norway) Notodden (Tveitanbakken HS100)	N _{117}	(Austria) J. Seifriedsberger	(Austria) D. Iraschko-Stolz	(Norway) Maren Lundby	(Austria) J. Seifriedsberger	
142	2	13 December 2014	(Norway) Notodden (Tveitanbakken HS100)	N _{118}	(Austria) D. Iraschko-Stolz	(Austria) Eva Pinkelnig	(Austria) J. Seifriedsberger	(Austria) D. Iraschko-Stolz	
		17 January 2015	(Sweden) Falun (Lugnet HS100)	N _{cnx}	cancelled due to strong wind and rescheduled on next day			—	
143	3	(Note: Women's normal hill cancelled competition in Falun (17 January) was rescheduled on 18 January (1st event of the day).)18 January 2015	(Sweden) Falun (Lugnet HS100)	N _{119}	(Norway) Anette Sagen	(Canada) Taylor Henrich	(Finland) Susanna Forsström	(Austria) D. Iraschko-Stolz	
144	4	18 January 2015	(Sweden) Falun (Lugnet HS100)	N _{120}	(Canada) Taylor Henrich	(Norway) Anette Sagen	(Czech Republic) Zdena Pešatová	(Norway) Anette Sagen	
11th FIS Winter Continental Cup Women's Overall (12 December 2014 – 18 January 2015)					(Norway) Anette Sagen	(Austria) D. Iraschko-Stolz	(Canada) Taylor Henrich	Winter Overall	

==== Overall ====
Rank	after 4 events	Points
1	(Norway) Anette Sagen	235
2	(Austria) Daniela Iraschko-Stolz	180
	(Canada) Taylor Henrich	180
4	(Austria) Jacqueline Seifriedsberger	160
5	(Austria) Eva Pinkelnig	125
6	(Finland) Susanna Forsström	113
7	(Czech Republic) Zdena Pešatová	105
8	(United States) Sarah Hendrickson	95
9	(Norway) Maren Lundby	92
10	(United States) Abby Hughes	90
	(France) Léa Lemare	90

== Europa Cup vs. Continental Cup ==
- Last two Europa Cup seasons (1991/92 and 1992/93) are recognized as first two Continental Cup seasons by International Ski Federation (FIS), although Continental Cup under this name officially started first season in 1993/94 season.

== See also ==
- 2014–15 FIS World Cup
- 2014 FIS Grand Prix
- 2014–15 FIS Alpen Cup
