= 2014 FIS Ski Jumping Grand Prix =

International ski jumping competition

Grand Prix 2014
Discipline	Men	Women
Overall	(Slovenia) Jernej Damjan	(Japan) Sara Takanashi
Nations Cup	Norway	Japan

Competition
Edition	21st	3rd
Locations	7	1
Individual	9	2
Team	1	—

The 2014 FIS Ski Jumping Grand Prix was the 21st Summer Grand Prix season in ski jumping on plastic for men and the 3rd for ladies. The season began on 25 July 2014 in Wisła, Poland and will end on 4 October 2014 in Klingenthal, Germany.

First time in history of ski jumping a new rule of three series in individual events was introduced which was tested for ski flying events in the winter. A rule where three jumps counted in total points, including the qualification round a day before. 48 qualified jumpers advance in first round of competition where they were divided in 4 groups of 12 competitors. In the final round advanced 24 jumpers, 6 best of each group started from back order. There was a big confusion even amongst competitors. That's why they cancelled this rule and wasn't used in the ski flying events.

Other competitive circuits this season included the World Cup, Continental Cup and Alpen Cup.

== Calendar ==
=== Men ===
Num	Season	Date	Place	Hill	Size	Winner	Second	Third	Yellow bib	Ref.
148	1	26 July 2014	(Poland) Wisła	Malinka HS134	LH	(Slovenia) Peter Prevc	(Poland) Piotr Żyła	(Germany) Andreas Wellinger	(Slovenia) Peter Prevc	
149	2	9 August 2014	(Switzerland) Einsiedeln	Andreas Küttel Schanze HS117	LH	(Austria) Gregor Schlierenzauer	(Poland) Piotr Żyła	(Austria) Michael Hayböck	(Poland) Piotr Żyła	
150	3	15 August 2014	(France) Courchevel	Tremplin du Praz HS132	LH	(Norway) Andreas Stjernen	(Norway) Phillip Sjøen	(Austria) Kamil Stoch	(Norway) Andreas Stjernen (Slovenia) Peter Prevc	
151	4	23 August 2014	(Japan) Hakuba	Olympic Ski Jumps HS131 (night)	LH	(Norway) Phillip Sjøen	(Slovenia) Jernej Damjan	(Norway) Daniel-André Tande	(Norway) Phillip Sjøen	
152	5	24 August 2014	(Japan) Hakuba	Olympic Ski Jumps HS131	LH	(Norway) Phillip Sjøen	(Norway) Daniel-André Tande	(Slovenia) Jernej Damjan	(Norway) Phillip Sjøen	
153	6	20 September 2014	(Kazakhstan) Almaty	Sunkar HS140 (night)	LH	(Slovenia) Jernej Damjan	(Japan) Reruhi Shimizu	(Russia) Vladislav Boyarintsev	(Norway) Phillip Sjøen	
154	7	21 September 2014	(Kazakhstan) Almaty	Sunkar HS140	LH	(Japan) Taku Takeuchi	(Slovenia) Jernej Damjan	(Norway) Phillip Sjøen	(Norway) Phillip Sjøen	
155	8	28 September 2014	(Austria) Hinzenbach	Aigner-Schanze HS94	NH	(Czech Republic) Roman Koudelka	(Austria) Gregor Schlierenzauer	(Germany) Marinus Kraus	(Slovenia) Jernej Damjan	
156	9	4 October 2014	(Germany) Klingenthal	Vogtland Arena HS140	LH	(Germany) Richard Freitag	(Czech Republic) Roman Koudelka	(Norway) Rune Velta	(Slovenia) Jernej Damjan	

=== Ladies ===
Num	Season	Date	Place	Hill	Size	Winner	Second	Third	Yellow bib	Ref.
11	1	20 September 2014	(Kazakhstan) Almaty	Sunkar HS106	NH	(Japan) Sara Takanashi	(Russia) Irina Avvakumova	(Japan) Yūki Itō	(Japan) Sara Takanashi	
12	2	21 September 2014	(Kazakhstan) Almaty	Sunkar HS106	NH	(Japan) Sara Takanashi	(Germany) Katharina Althaus	(Slovenia) Maja Vtič	(Japan) Sara Takanashi	

=== Men's team ===
Num	Season	Date	Place	Hill	Size	Winner	Second	Third	Yellow bib	Ref.
18	1	25 July 2014	(Poland) Wisła	Malinka HS134 (night)	LH	Poland Maciej Kot; Piotr Żyła; Dawid Kubacki; Kamil Stoch	Czech Republic Jakub Janda; Lukáš Hlava; Antonín Hájek; Roman Koudelka	Austria Michael Hayböck; Stefan Kraft; Thomas Diethart; Gregor Schlierenzauer	Poland	

== Men's standings ==
=== Overall ===
Rank	after 9 events	Points
1	(Slovenia) Jernej Damjan	441
2	(Norway) Phillip Sjøen	382
3	(Japan) Taku Takeuchi	316
4	(Austria) Gregor Schlierenzauer	244
5	(Japan) Junshirō Kobayashi	224

=== Nations Cup ===
Rank	after 10 events	Points
1	Norway	1396
2	Slovenia	1194
3	Germany	1088
4	Japan	1068
5	Poland	962

== Ladies' standings ==
=== Overall ===
Rank	after 2 events	Points
1	(Japan) Sara Takanashi	200
2	(Germany) Katharina Althaus	125
3	(Russia) Irina Avvakumova	112
4	(Slovenia) Maja Vtič	100
5	(Japan) Yūki Itō	96

=== Nations Cup ===
Rank	after 2 events	Points
1	Japan	296
2	Slovenia	190
3	Russia	183
4	Germany	142
5	Norway	123
