= 2014–15 FIS Ski Jumping Alpen Cup =

Alpen Cup 2014/15
Discipline	Men	Women
Overall	(Austria) Simon Greider	(Germany) Agnes Reisch

Competition
Edition	25th	7th
Locations	6	7
Individual	12	14
Cancelled	4	6
Rescheduled	4	4

The 2014/15 FIS Ski Jumping Alpen Cup was the 25th Alpen Cup season in ski jumping for men and the 7th for ladies. It began on 13 August 2014 in Pöhla, Germany and ended on 8 March 2015 in Chaux-Neuve, France.

Other competitive circuits this season included the World Cup, Grand Prix and Continental Cup.

== Calendar ==
=== Men ===
Season	Date	Place	Hill	Size	Winner	Second	Third	Ref.
1	13 September 2014	(Switzerland) Einsiedeln	Andreas Küttel Schanze HS117	LH	(Austria) Patrick Streitler	(Switzerland) Killian Peier	(Austria) Elias Tollinger	
2	14 September 2014	(Switzerland) Einsiedeln	Andreas Küttel Schanze HS117	LH	(Austria) Philipp Aschenwald	(Italy) Daniele Varesco	(Austria) Elias Tollinger	
3	26 September 2014	(Austria) Tschagguns	Zelfen HS108	NH	(Austria) Maximilian Steiner (Austria) Felix Greber		(Germany) Dominik Mayländer	
4	27 September 2014	(Austria) Tschagguns	Zelfen HS108	NH	(Austria) Simon Greiderer (Slovenia) Tilen Bartol		(Slovenia) Domen Prevc	
	19 December 2014	(Austria) Seefeld	Toni-Seelos-Olympiaschanze HS109	NH	rescheduled in January			
	20 December 2014	(Austria) Seefeld	Toni-Seelos-Olympiaschanze HS109	NH	rescheduled in January			
5	5 January 2015	(Austria) Seefeld	Toni-Seelos-Olympiaschanze HS109	NH	(Austria) Simon Greiderer	(Slovenia) Anže Lavtižar (France) Paul Brasme		
6	6 January 2015	(Austria) Seefeld	Toni-Seelos-Olympiaschanze HS109	NH	(Switzerland) Killian Peier	(Austria) Philipp Aschenwald	(Austria) Simon Greiderer	
	10 January 2015	(Germany) Schonach	Langenwaldschanze HS106	NH	rescheduled to Oberwiesenthal			
	11 January 2015	(Germany) Schonach	Langenwaldschanze HS106	NH	rescheduled to Oberwiesenthal			
7	16 January 2015	(Germany) Oberwiesenthal	Fichtelbergschanzen HS106	NH	(Germany) Sebastian Bradatsch	(Slovenia) Cene Prevc	(Austria) Simon Greiderer	
8	17 January 2015	(Germany) Oberwiesenthal	Fichtelbergschanzen HS106	NH	(Slovenia) Cene Prevc	(Germany) Sebastian Bradatsch	(Germany) Tim Fuchs	
9	14 February 2015	(Slovenia) Kranj	Bauhenk HS109	NH	(Slovenia) Cene Prevc	(France) Paul Brasme	(Austria) Markus Rupitsch	
10	15 February 2015	(Slovenia) Kranj	Bauhenk HS109	NH	(Slovenia) Cene Prevc	(France) Paul Brasme	(Austria) Markus Rupitsch	
11	7 March 2015	(France) Chaux-Neuve	La Côté Feuillée HS118	LH	(Austria) Alexander Hayböck	(Austria) Janni Reisenauer	(Austria) Domen Prevc	
12	8 March 2015	(France) Chaux-Neuve	La Côté Feuillée HS118	LH	(Slovenia) Domen Prevc	(Austria) Janni Reisenauer	(Germany) Dominik Mayländer	

=== Ladies ===
Season	Date	Place	Hill	Size	Winner	Second	Third	Ref.
1	13 August 2014	(Germany) Pöhla	Pöhlbachschanze HS65	MH	(Germany) Agnes Reisch	(Germany) Luisa Görlich	(Austria) Veronica Gianmoena	
2	14 August 2014	(Germany) Pöhla	Pöhlbachschanze HS65	MH	(Germany) Agnes Reisch	(Romania) Dana Vasilica Haralambie	(Germany) Luisa Görlich	
3	16 August 2014	(Germany) Bischofsgrün	Ochsenkopfschanze HS71	MH	(Germany) Agnes Reisch	(Austria) Claudia Purker	(Germany) Luisa Görlich	
4	17 August 2014	(Germany) Bischofsgrün	Ochsenkopfschanze HS71	MH	(Germany) Agnes Reisch	(Romania) Dana Vasilica Haralambie	(Czech Republic) Jana Mrakotova	
5	13 September 2014	(Switzerland) Einsiedeln	Simon Ammann Schanze HS77	MH	(Germany) Agnes Reisch	(Germany) Sophia Görlich	(Germany) Henriette Kraus	
6	14 September 2014	(Switzerland) Einsiedeln	Simon Ammann Schanze HS77	MH	(Germany) Agnes Reisch	(Germany) Luisa Görlich	(Austria) Elisabeth Raudaschl	
7	27 September 2014	(Austria) Tschagguns	Zelfen HS66	MH	(Austria) Claudia Purker	(Germany) Sophia Görlich	(Italy) Lara Malsiner	
8	28 September 2014	(Austria) Tschagguns	Zelfen HS66	MH	(Germany) Pauline Hessler	(Austria) Elisabeth Raudaschl	(Germany) Sophia Görlich	
	20 December 2014	(Germany) Rastbüchl	Baptist Kitzlinger Schanze HS79	MH	rescheduled to Seefeld			
	21 December 2014	(Germany) Rastbüchl	Baptist Kitzlinger Schanze HS79	MH	rescheduled to Seefeld			
9	5 January 2015	(Austria) Seefeld	Toni-Seelos-Olympiaschanze HS109	NH	(Austria) Julia Huber	(Austria) Lisa Wiegele	(Austria) Elisabeth Raudaschl	
10	6 January 2015	(Austria) Seefeld	Toni-Seelos-Olympiaschanze HS109	NH	(Germany) Henriette Kraus	(Italy) Lara Malsiner	(Germany) Agnes Reich	
	10 January 2015	(Germany) Schonach	Langenwaldschanze HS106	NH	rescheduled to Oberwiesenthal			
	11 January 2015	(Germany) Schonach	Langenwaldschanze HS106	NH	rescheduled to Oberwiesenthal			
11	16 January 2015	(Germany) Oberwiesenthal	Fichtelbergschanzen HS106	NH	(Austria) Elisabeth Raudaschl	(Germany) Henriette Kraus	(Germany) Pauline Hessler	
12	17 January 2015	(Germany) Oberwiesenthal	Fichtelbergschanzen HS106	NH	(Germany) Pauline Hessler	(Germany) Henriette Kraus	(Germany) Agnes Reich	
	7 February 2015	(Slovenia) Žiri	Nordijski center Račeva HS66	MH	cancelled			
	8 February 2015	(Slovenia) Žiri	Nordijski center Račeva HS66	MH	cancelled			
13	7 March 2015	(France) Chaux-Neuve	La Côté Feuillée HS60	MH	(Germany) Agnes Reich	(Germany) Luisa Görlich	(France) Oceane Paillard	
14	8 March 2015	(France) Chaux-Neuve	La Côté Feuillée HS60	MH	(Germany) Agnes Reich	(Germany) Luisa Görlich	(Austria) Elisabeth Raudaschl	

== Overall standings ==
=== Men ===
Rank	after 12 events	Points
1	(Austria) Simon Greiderer	484
2	(Slovenia) Cene Prevc	402
3	(France) Paul Brasme	395
4	(Austria) Maximilian Steiner	387
5	(Slovenia) Tilen Bartol	361

=== Ladies ===
Rank	after 14 events	Points
1	(Germany) Agnes Reisch	1001
2	(Austria) Elisabeth Raudaschl	720
3	(Germany) Luisa Görlich	661
4	(Germany) Henritte Kraus	586
5	(Italy) Lara Malsiner	534
