= Bozhkov =

Bozhkov (Bulgarian: Божков) is a Bulgarian masculine surname, its feminine counterpart is Bozhkova. It may refer to

- Alexander Bozhkov (1951–2009), Bulgarian politician
- Daniel Bozhkov (born 1983), Bulgarian footballer
- Stefan Bozhkov (1923–2014), Bulgarian footballer and manager
- Svetla Bozhkova (born 1951), Bulgarian discus thrower
- Valentin Bozhkov (born 1958), Bulgarian ski jumper
- Vasil Bozhkov (born 1956), Bulgarian
