= FIS Ski Flying World Championships 2018 =

25th edition of the FIS Ski Flying World Championships

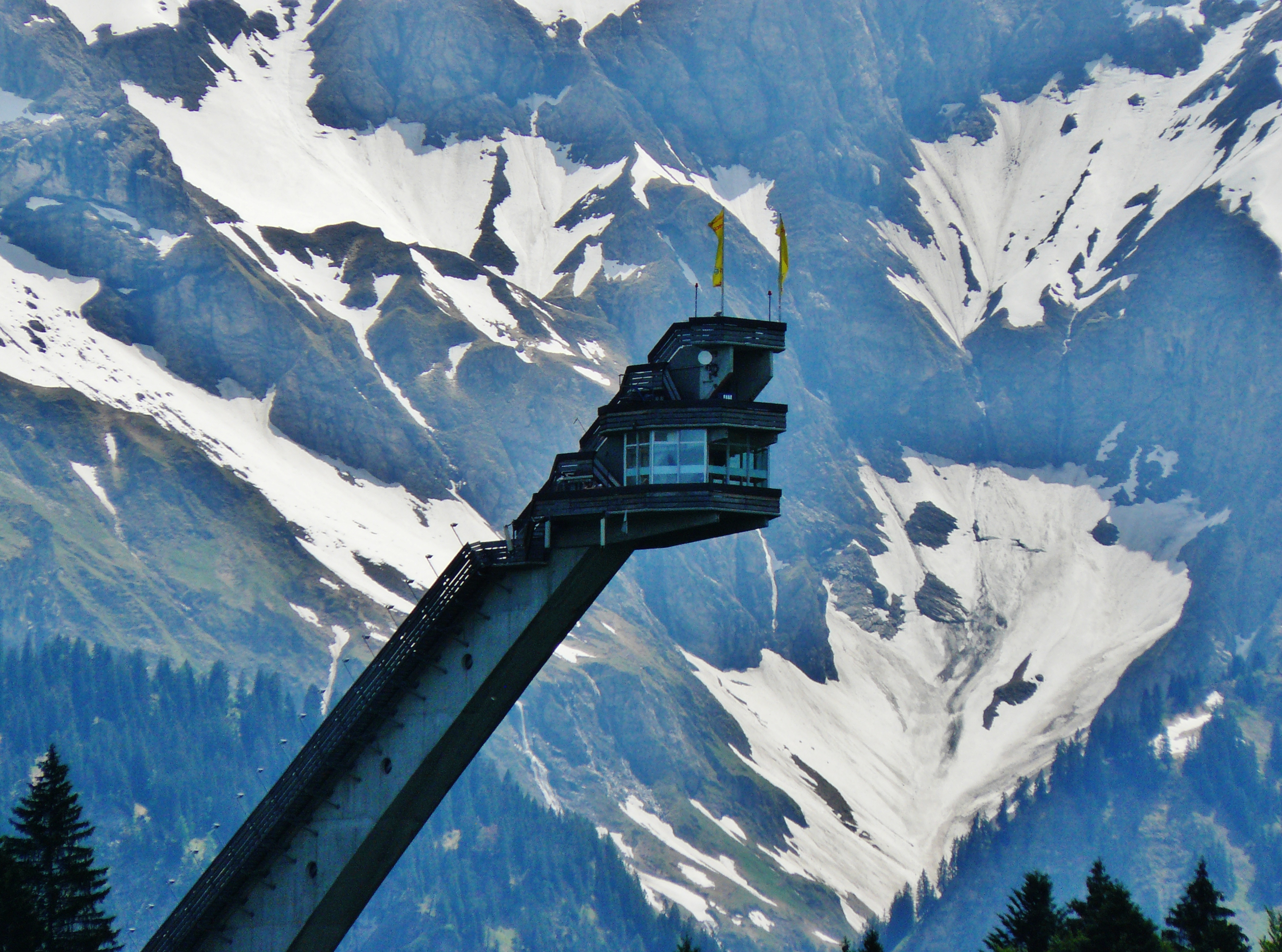
- Host city: Oberstdorf, Germany
- Nations: 16
- Athletes: 54
- Sport: Ski flying
- Events: 2
- Opening: 18 January 2018
- Closing: 21 January 2018
- Main venue: Heini-Klopfer-Skiflugschanze
- Individual prize money (US$): 74,500
- Team prize money (US$): 72,500

The FIS Ski Flying World Championships 2018 was the 25th Ski Flying World Championships. It was held between 18 and 21 January 2018 in Oberstdorf, Germany and for the sixth time on this location. They hosted world championships at Heini-Klopfer-Skiflugschanze already in 1973, 1981, 1988, 1998 and 2008. There was total prize money of 142,000 swiss francs (72,000 for individual and 70,000 for team event).

Peter Prevc was the defending individual champion and Norway (Anders Fannemel, Johann André Forfang, Daniel-André Tande and Kenneth Gangnes) was defending the team title.

Daniel-André Tande became the new individual world champion and Norway (Robert Johansson, Andreas Stjernen, Johann André Forfang and Daniel-André Tande) took the team title.

== Prize money ==
A total prize of 142,000 swiss francs was awarded: 72,000 CHF to the Top6 individuals and 70,000 CHF to the Top3 teams.

Event	Gold	Silver	Bronze	4th to 6th place
Individual	CHF 28,750	CHF 18,000	CHF 10,800	CHF 14,440
Team event	CHF 35,000	CHF 21,000	CHF 14,800	not awarded

== Schedule ==
Heini-Klopfer-Skiflugschanze (K200 / HS235)
Date	Competition	Longest jump of the day	Metres	Feet
17 January 2018	Hill test	wind conditions		
18 January 2018	Training 1	(Norway) Daniel-André Tande	223.5	733
18 January 2018	Training 2	(United States) William Rhoads	182.5	599
18 January 2018	Training 2	T2 canceled after 3 jumps; wind conditions		
18 January 2018	Qualifications	moved on next day; wind conditions		
19 January 2018	Trial round D1	canceled; qualifications instead		
19 January 2018	Qualifications	(Norway) Daniel-André Tande	238.5	782
19 January 2018	1st round Individual	(Poland) Kamil Stoch	230.0	755
19 January 2018	2nd round Individual	(Norway) Daniel-André Tande	227.0	745
20 January 2018	Trial round D2	(Norway) Andreas Stjernen	216.5	710
20 January 2018	3rd round Individual	(Norway) Andreas Stjernen	223.5	733
20 January 2018	4th round Individual	(Italy) Sebastian Colloredo	178.0	584
20 January 2018	4th round Individual	4th round canceled after 3 jumps; wind		
21 January 2018	Trial round TE	(Norway) Andreas Stjernen	230.5	756
21 January 2018	1st round Team event	(Norway) Andreas Stjernen	231.0	758
21 January 2018	2nd round Team event	(Poland) Dawid Kubacki	221.5	727

== Results ==
=== Qualifying ===
Second training canceled after 3 jumps; wind conditions
Rank	Bib	Name	Training 1	Training 2	Qualifying	Points	Note
1	53	(Norway) Daniel-André Tande	223.5		238.5	222.1	Q
2	34	(Poland) Kamil Stoch	214.5		232.0	210.7	Q
3	54	(Norway) Andreas Stjernen	206.5		217.0	210.1	Q
4	41	(Poland) Stefan Hula	179.0		217.0	208.2	Q
5	46	(Austria) Stefan Kraft	204.5		217.0	203.7	Q
6	26	(Germany) Richard Freitag	207.0		219.5	201.5	Q
7	52	(Switzerland) Simon Ammann	208.5		214.5	193.6	Q
8	47	(Slovenia) Anže Semenič	211.5		209.0	193.2	Q
	21	(Poland) Dawid Kubacki	171.5		211.5	193.2	Q
10	51	(Norway) Robert Johansson	211.5		211.5	192.6	Q
11	29	(Slovenia) Jernej Damjan	203.5		209.5	188.3	Q
12	50	(Japan) Noriaki Kasai	DNS		201.0	185.0	Q
13	49	(Slovenia) Peter Prevc	188.0		200.5	184.7	Q
14	38	(Poland) Piotr Żyła	192.0		201.5	182.5	Q
15	28	(Norway) Johann André Forfang	203.5		204.5	181.9	Q
16	40	(Germany) Andreas Wellinger	176.5		198.5	180.9	Q
17	36	(Austria) Manuel Poppinger	177.0		199.0	179.2	Q
18	43	(Austria) Michael Hayböck	185.5		189.5	177.6	Q
19	45	(Germany) Markus Eisenbichler	215.0		197.5	176.6	Q
20	35	(Germany) Stephan Leyhe	190.0		195.5	175.2	Q
21	32	(United States) Kevin Bickner	156.5		201.0	175.0	Q
22	30	(Japan) Ryōyū Kobayashi	193.0		199.5	174.3	Q
23	5	(Russia) Dimitry Vassiliev	DNS		197.0	171.3	Q
24	37	(Slovenia) Tilen Bartol	195.0		189.0	164.4	Q
25	20	(Japan) Junshirō Kobayashi	156.5		192.5	163.9	Q
26	3	(Russia) Alexey Romashov	164.0	134.0	190.0	160.9	Q
27	48	(Austria) Clemens Aigner	179.5		183.5	158.7	Q
28	11	(Russia) Denis Kornilov	178.0		182.5	155.5	Q
29	4	(Italy) Alex Insam	168.5		184.5	153.9	Q
30	27	(Italy) Sebastian Colloredo	171.5		180.0	149.4	Q
31	18	(Canada) MacKenzie Boyd-Clowes	166.5		185.5	146.8	Q
32	19	(Finland) Janne Ahonen	181.5		177.5	142.8	Q
33	44	(Slovenia) Domen Prevc	171.5		163.5	142.7	Q
34	17	(Switzerland) Andreas Schuler	170.5		170.0	134.4	Q
35	8	(Finland) Antti Aalto	156.0		157.5	134.3	Q
36	15	(Switzerland) Gregor Deschwanden	171.5		168.5	132.8	Q
37	7	(Russia) Mikhail Nazarov	158.0		150.0	128.7	Q
38	14	(United States) Michael Glasder	182.5		161.5	128.2	Q
39	24	(France) Vincent Descombes Sevoie	166.5		162.0	125.6	Q
40	22	(Finland) Eetu Nousiainen	160.0		154.0	118.8	Q
not qualified
	25	(Switzerland) Killian Peier	176.0		151.0	113.5	
	2	(United States) William Rhoads	174.5	182.5	147.5	108.6	
	42	(Czech Republic) Čestmír Kožíšek	156.0		124.0	88.7	
	1	(Kazakhstan) Marat Zhaparov	126.5	114.0	125.0	81.3	
	10	(Kazakhstan) Konstantin Sokolenko	107.0		111.0	70.1	
	6	(Italy) Davide Bresadola	110.0		112.0	66.3	
	9	(Estonia) Martti Nomme	DNS		DNS		
	16	(Finland) Jarkko Määttä	DNS		DNS		
internal team qualification: did not enter in qualifying round
	39	(Norway) Anders Fannemel	183.5		DNS		
	33	(Poland) Maciej Kot	177.5		DNS		
	31	(Norway) Halvor Egner Granerud	184.5		DNS		
	23	(Germany) Karl Geiger	187.5		DNS		
	13	(Austria) Florian Altenburger	162.5		DNS		
	12	(Slovenia) Žiga Jelar	181.5		DNS		

=== Trial rounds ===
1st day individual trial round canceled; wind conditions
Bib	Individual (Day 2)	20 January
1	(Russia) Mikhail Nazarov	160.0
2	(Italy) Sebastian Colloredo	177.0
3	(Japan) Junshirō Kobayashi	203.5
4	(Japan) Noriaki Kasai	DNS
5	(Italy) Alex Insam	175.0
6	(Russia) Alexey Romashov	147.0
7	(Finland) Janne Ahonen	182.5
8	(Slovenia) Domen Prevc	173.5
9	(United States) Kevin Bickner	188.0
10	(Russia) Denis Kornilov	187.5
11	(Poland) Piotr Żyła	201.0
12	(Germany) Stephan Leyhe	181.0
13	(Austria) Manuel Poppinger	181.5
14	(Austria) Clemens Aigner	185.0
15	(Slovenia) Jernej Damjan	DNS
16	(Switzerland) Simon Ammann	168.5
17	(Poland) Stefan Hula	181.0
18	(Slovenia) Anže Semenič	199.0
19	(Germany) Markus Eisenbichler	199.5
20	(Japan) Junshirō Kobayashi	194.0
21	(Poland) Dawid Kubacki	203.5
22	(Norway) Johann André Forfang	207.5
23	(Germany) Andreas Wellinger	196.0
24	(Slovenia) Peter Prevc	195.5
25	(Norway) Andreas Stjernen	216.5
26	(Norway) Robert Johansson	208.5
27	(Austria) Stefan Kraft	194.0
28	(Poland) Kamil Stoch	215.5
29	(Germany) Richard Freitag	209.0
30	(Norway) Daniel-André Tande	211.5

Bib	Team event	21 January
1 1	(Finland) Antti Aalto	186.5
2 1	(Russia) Alexey Romashov	167.5
3 1	(Switzerland) Andreas Schuler	186.5
4 1	(Slovenia) Jernej Damjan	203.5
5 1	(Austria) Clemens Aigner	192.0
6 1	(Poland) Piotr Żyła	206.0
7 1	(Germany) Andreas Wellinger	198.5
8 1	(Norway) Robert Johansson	209.0
1 2	(Finland) Jarkko Määttä	170.5
2 2	(Russia) Mikhail Nazarov	169.5
3 2	(Switzerland) Killian Peier	164.5
4 2	(Slovenia) Anže Semenič	228.5
5 2	(Austria) Manuel Poppinger	213.0
6 2	(Poland) Stefan Hula	207.0
7 2	(Germany) Stephan Leyhe	200.0
8 2	(Norway) Andreas Stjernen	230.5
1 3	(Finland) Eetu Nousiainen	178.5
2 3	(Russia) Denis Kornilov	195.5
3 3	(Switzerland) Gregor Deschwanden	156.0
4 3	(Slovenia) Domen Prevc	218.0
5 3	(Austria) Michael Hayböck	211.0
6 3	(Poland) Dawid Kubacki	221.5
7 3	(Germany) Markus Eisenbichler	201.0
8 3	(Norway) Johann André Forfang	215.0
1 4	(Finland) Janne Ahonen	191.5
2 4	(Russia) Dmitry Vassiliev	193.0
3 4	(Switzerland) Simon Ammann	DNS
4 4	(Slovenia) Peter Prevc	200.0
5 4	(Austria) Stefan Kraft	208.5
6 4	(Poland) Kamil Stoch	198.0
7 4	(Germany) Richard Freitag	204.5
8 4	(Norway) Daniel-André Tande	211.5

== Competition ==
=== Individual ===
Individual
- Date: 19–20 January 2018
- Competitors: 40 from 12 nations
- Winning score: 651.9

Medalists
gold medal	(Norway) Daniel-André Tande
silver medal	(Poland) Kamil Stoch
bronze medal	(Germany) Richard Freitag

Medalist
Daniel-André Tande	Kamil Stoch	Richard Freitag
Norway	Poland	Germany

4th round canceled after three jumpers
Rank	Bib1	Bib2	Name	19 January (Day 1)		20 January (Day 2)		Total
Rank	Bib1	Bib2	Name	1st round	2nd round	3rd round	4th round	Total
1	47	30	(Norway) Daniel-André Tande	212.0	227.0	200.0		651.9
2	29	28	(Poland) Kamil Stoch	230.0	219.0	211.5		638.6
3	23	29	(Germany) Richard Freitag	228.0	225.0	190.5		627.6
4	40	27	(Austria) Stefan Kraft	218.0	208.5	206.0		608.4
5	48	25	(Norway) Andreas Stjernen	193.0	203.0	223.5		606.9
6	43	24	(Slovenia) Peter Prevc	222.5	199.0	218.0		600.1
7	34	23	(Germany) Andreas Wellinger	206.0	207.0	213.0		599.7
8	25	22	(Norway) Johann André Forfang	207.0	207.5	225.5		599.2
9	45	26	(Norway) Robert Johansson	204.0	213.5	201.0		599.0
10	19	21	(Poland) Dawid Kubacki	207.5	208.0	215.5		589.8
11	39	19	(Germany) Markus Eisenbichler	197.5	205.5	203.0		560.1
12	46	16	(Switzerland) Simon Ammann	203.5	177.0	207.5		559.2
13	35	17	(Poland) Stefan Hula	193.0	196.5	192.5		550.0
14	41	18	(Slovenia) Anže Semenič	214.5	178.0	186.0		538.8
15	26	15	(Slovenia) Jernej Damjan	216.0	174.5	197.5		533.8
16	27	20	(Japan) Ryoyu Kobayashi	207.5	205.5	165.5		528.4
17	33	11	(Poland) Piotr Żyła	190.0	183.5	198.5		525.8
18	42	14	(Austria) Clemens Aigner	202.0	181.5	194.5		524.5
19	11	10	(Russia) Denis Kornilov	188.0	183.5	191.0		509.6
20	30	12	(Germany) Stephan Leyhe	183.5	197.5	184.5		502.9
21	38	8	(Slovenia) Domen Prevc	179.5	187.5	192.5		501.1
22	17	7	(Finland) Janne Ahonen	182.0	194.5	192.0		500.0
23	31	13	(Austria) Manuel Poppinger	187.0	195.5	177.5		498.0
24	28	9	(United States) Kevin Bickner	201.5	167.0	181.0		494.3
25	44	4	(Japan) Noriaki Kasai	218.5	123.5	209.0		493.6
26	3	6	(Russia) Alexey Romashov	184.0	191.0	168.5		455.5
27	4	5	(Italy) Alex Insam	174.5	185.0	159.5		443.4
28	24	2	(Italy) Sebastian Colloredo	159.0	184.0	191.5	178.0	439.0
29	18	3	(Japan) Junshirō Kobayashi	171.5	169.0	165.0	170.0	408.7
30	7	1	(Russia) Mikhail Nazarov (lucky loser)	160.5	161.0	175.0	167.5	396.6
not qualified for 2nd round
31	37		(Austria) Michael Hayböck (drop out in 1R)	171.5	DNS			126.0
32	8		(Finland) Antti Aalto	160.0	DNQ			117.6
33	5		(Russia) Dimitry Vassiliev	159.0	DNQ			113.5
34	13		(Switzerland) Gregor Deschwanden	150.5	DNQ			111.8
35	20		(Finland) Eetu Nousiainen	161.0	DNQ			111.4
36	16		(Canada) MacKenzie Boyd-Clowes	147.5	DNQ			102.3
37	15		(Switzerland) Andreas Schuler	141.5	DNQ			98.1
38	12		(United States) Michael Glasder	140.0	DNQ			95.9
39	32		(Slovenia) Tilen Bartol	144.0	DNQ			95.3
40	21		(France) Vincent Descombes Sevoie	133.0	DNQ			79.9

=== Team ===
Team
- Date: 21 January 2018
- Competitors: 32 from 8 nations
- Teams: 8
- Winning score: 1662.2

Medalists
gold medal	Norway
silver medal	Slovenia
bronze medal	Poland

Rank	Bib	Name	1st round	2nd round	Total
1	8	Norway 1 Robert Johansson; 2 Andreas Stjernen; 3 Johann André Forfang; 4 Daniel-André Tande	219.5; 231.0; 214.0; 224.0	218.0; 208.0; 217.0; 202.5	1662.2; 399.9; 427.3; 405.0; 430.0
2	4	Slovenia 1 Jernej Damjan; 2 Anže Semenič; 3 Domen Prevc; 4 Peter Prevc	212.0; 207.5; 214.0; 202.0	220.0; 220.5; 216.0; 193.0	1615.8; 405.4; 411.7; 406.3; 392.4
3	6	Poland 1 Piotr Żyła; 2 Stefan Hula; 3 Dawid Kubacki; 4 Kamil Stoch	212.5; 206.0; 204.5; 209.5	204.0; 210.0; 221.5; 204.0	1592.1; 382.0; 392.9; 400.5; 416.7
4	7	Germany 1 Andreas Wellinger; 2 Stephan Leyhe; 3 Markus Eisenbichler; 4 Richard Freitag	226.0; 200.0; 200.0; 221.5	212.0; 186.5; 210.5; 216.5	1581.2; 402.2; 363.3; 379.4; 436.3
5	5	Austria 1 Clemens Aigner; 2 Manuel Poppinger; 3 Michael Hayböck; 4 Stefan Kraft	200.0; 194.5; 187.0; 200.0	202.0; 208.0; 212.0; 202.0	1488.3; 360.5; 372.4; 363.4; 392.5
6	3	Switzerland 1 Andreas Schuler; 2 Killian Peier; 3 Gregor Deschwanden; 4 Simon Ammann	172.0; 175.5; 183.0; 201.0	193.0; 176.5; 190.5; 216.5	1350.6; 310.7; 306.8; 327.3; 405.8
7	2	Russia 1 Alexey Romashov; 2 Mikhail Nazarov; 3 Denis Kornilov; 4 Dmitry Vassiliev	176.5; 167.0; 191.0; 206.0	188.5; 172.5; 176.0; 191.5	1283.2; 306.4; 287.5; 316.3; 373.0
8	1	Finland 1 Antti Aalto; 2 Jarkko Määttä; 3 Eetu Nousiainen; 4 Janne Ahonen	177.0; 172.0; 177.0; 192.0	184.0; 174.5; 180.0; 189.0	1262.2; 304.8; 298.0; 300.9; 358.5
