= Prevc =

Prevc (Slovene: [ˈpɾéːwts]) is a Slovene surname. Notable people with the surname include the Prevc family, all professional ski jumpers:

- Cene Prevc (born 1996)
- Domen Prevc (born 1999)
- Nika Prevc (born 2005)
- Peter Prevc (born 1992)
