= Anže Semenič =

Slovenian ski jumper

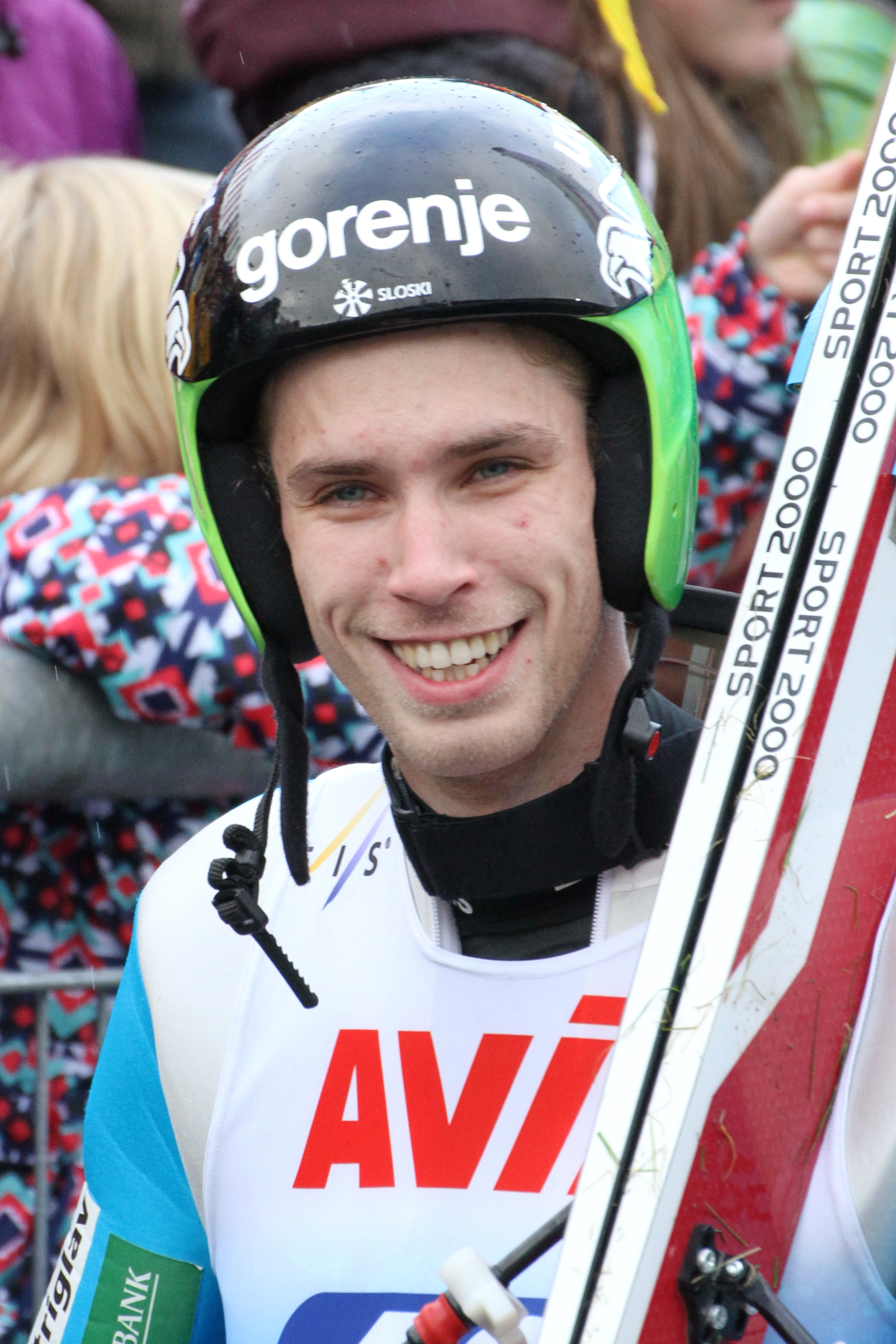
- Semenič in Klingenthal, 2017

Personal information
- Nationality: Slovenia
- Born: 1 August 1993 (age 33) Kranj, Slovenia
- Height: 1.90 m (6 ft 3 in)

Sport
- Sport: Ski jumping

World Cup career
- Seasons: 2013–2022
- Indiv. starts: 88
- Indiv. podiums: 1
- Indiv. wins: 1
- Team starts: 14
- Team podiums: 6
- Team wins: 2

Achievements and titles
- Personal bests: 249.5 m (819 ft); Planica, 25 March 2022
Medal record
Men's ski jumping
Ski Flying World Championships
Silver medal – second place	2018 Oberstdorf	Team event

Anže Semenič (born 1 August 1993) is a Slovenian former ski jumper.

He competed at World Cup level from 2013 to 2022.

== Career ==
Semenič won the 2014–15 Continental Cup overall title, and made his World Cup debut in 2013. With the Slovenia national team, he won his first World Cup competition in the team event in Planica in March 2015.

In 2016, he achieved his first Grand Prix win in Nizhny Tagil, before winning his first and only individual World Cup event in Zakopane during the 2017–18 season.

== World Cup ==
=== Standings ===
Season	Overall	4H	SF	RA
2012–13	—	—	—	N/A
2013–14	—	—	—	N/A
2014–15	53	—	28	N/A
2015–16	64	68	40	N/A
2016–17	45	47	26	35
2017–18	22	34	18	52
2018–19	28	28	15	35
2019–20	37	—	20	37
2020–21	51	—	29	N/A
2021–22	61	—	31	53

=== Individual wins ===
No.	Season	Date	Location	Hill	Size
1	2017–18	28 January 2018	(Poland) Zakopane	Wielka Krokiew HS140	LH

=== Individual starts ===
winner (1); second (2); third (3); did not compete (–); failed to qualify (q); disqualified (DQ)
Season	1	2	3	4	5	6	7	8	9	10	11	12	13	14	15	16	17	18	19	20	21	22	23	24	25	26	27	28	29	30	31	Points
2012–13	Lillehammer	Lillehammer	Kuusamo	Krasnaja Polana	Krasnaja Polana	Engelberg	Engelberg	Oberstdorf	Garmisch-Partenkirchen	Innsbruck	Bischofshofen	Wisła	Zakopane	Sapporo	Sapporo	Vikersund	Vikersund	Harrachov	Harrachov	Klingenthal	Oberstdorf	Lahti	Kuopio	Trondheim	Oslo	Planica	Planica					0
2012–13	–	–	–	–	–	–	–	–	–	–	–	40	37	–	–	–	–	–	–	–	–	–	–	34	50	39	–					0
2013–14	Klingenthal	Kuusamo	Lillehammer	Lillehammer	Titisee-Neustadt	Titisee-Neustadt	Engelberg	Engelberg	Oberstdorf	Garmisch-Partenkirchen	Innsbruck	Bischofshofen	Tauplitz	Tauplitz	Wisła	Zakopane	Sapporo	Sapporo	Willingen	Willingen	Falun	Lahti	Lahti	Kuopio	Trondheim	Oslo	Planica	Planica				0
2013–14	–	–	–	–	–	–	–	–	–	–	–	–	–	–	–	–	–	–	–	–	–	–	–	–	–	–	DQ	–				0
2014–15	Klingenthal	Kuusamo	Kuusamo	Lillehammer	Lillehammer	Nizhny Tagil	Nizhny Tagil	Engelberg	Engelberg	Oberstdorf	Garmisch-Partenkirchen	Innsbruck	Bischofshofen	Tauplitz	Wisła	Zakopane	Sapporo	Sapporo	Willingen	Willingen	Titisee-Neustadt	Titisee-Neustadt	Vikersund	Vikersund	Lahti	Kuopio	Trondheim	Oslo	Oslo	Planica	Planica	35
2014–15	–	–	–	–	–	–	–	–	–	–	–	–	–	–	–	–	–	–	–	–	–	–	26	27	–	–	–	–	–	10	–	35
2015–16	Klingenthal	Lillehammer	Lillehammer	Nizhny Tagil	Nizhny Tagil	Engelberg	Engelberg	Oberstdorf	Garmisch-Partenkirchen	Innsbruck	Bischofshofen	Willingen	Zakopane	Sapporo	Sapporo	Oslo	Trondheim	Vikersund	Vikersund	Lahti	Lahti	Kuopio	Almaty	Almaty	Wisła	Titisee-Neustadt	Planica	Planica	Planica			8
2015–16	–	47	–	47	29	43	–	q	q	q	50	q	–	–	–	–	–	–	–	–	–	–	47	42	–	–	29	27	–			8
2016–17	Kuusamo	Kuusamo	Klingenthal	Lillehammer	Lillehammer	Engelberg	Engelberg	Oberstdorf	Garmisch-Partenkirchen	Innsbruck	Bischofshofen	Wisła	Wisła	Zakopane	Willingen	Oberstdorf	Oberstdorf	Sapporo	Sapporo	Pyeongchang	Pyeongchang	Oslo	Trondheim	Vikersund	Planica	Planica						41
2016–17	–	–	–	–	–	–	–	q	46	36	44	q	–	–	38	DQ	20	26	44	44	39	28	q	19	21	–						41
2017–18	Wisła	Kuusamo	Nizhny Tagil	Nizhny Tagil	Titisee-Neustadt	Engelberg	Engelberg	Oberstdorf	Garmisch-Partenkirchen	Innsbruck	Bischofshofen	Tauplitz	Zakopane	Willingen	Willingen	Lahti	Oslo	Lillehammer	Trondheim	Vikersund	Planica	Planica										256
2017–18	48	17	9	21	18	26	31	42	34	–	25	8	1	15	15	q	q	48	48	q	30	17										256
2018–19	Wisła	Kuusamo	Kuusamo	Nizhny Tagil	Nizhny Tagil	Engelberg	Engelberg	Oberstdorf	Garmisch-Partenkirchen	Innsbruck	Bischofshofen	Val di Fiemme	Val di Fiemme	Zakopane	Sapporo	Sapporo	Oberstdorf	Oberstdorf	Oberstdorf	Lahti	Willingen	Willingen	Oslo	Lillehammer	Trondheim	Vikersund	Planica	Planica				203
2018–19	26	60	47	–	–	–	–	36	27	37	21	10	15	43	12	24	19	12	18	22	28	29	q	q	q	19	20	9				203
2019–20	Wisła	Kuusamo	Nizhny Tagil	Nizhny Tagil	Klingenthal	Engelberg	Engelberg	Oberstdorf	Garmisch-Partenkirchen	Innsbruck	Bischofshofen	Val di Fiemme	Val di Fiemme	Titisee-Neustadt	Titisee-Neustadt	Zakopane	Sapporo	Sapporo	Willingen	Tauplitz	Tauplitz	Râșnov	Râșnov	Lahti	Lahti	Oslo	Lillehammer	Trondheim	Vikersund			60
2019–20	q	30	q	q	34	q	53	–	–	–	q	–	–	–	–	–	–	–	10	45	12	–	–	33	36	q	20					60
2020–21	Wisła	Ruka	Ruka	Nizhny Tagil	Nizhny Tagil	Engelberg	Engelberg	Oberstdorf	Garmisch-Partenkirchen	Innsbruck	Bischofshofen	Titisee-Neustadt	Titisee-Neustadt	Zakopane	Lahti	Willingen	Willingen	Klingenthal	Klingenthal	Szczyrk	Szczyrk	Râșnov	Planica	Planica	Planica							30
2020–21	q	24	37	34	21	–	–	–	–	–	–	–	–	–	–	–	–	–	–	–	–	–	30	19	–							30
2021–22	Nizhny Tagil	Nizhny Tagil	Ruka	Ruka	Wisła	Klingenthal	Klingenthal	Engelberg	Engelberg	Oberstdorf	Garmisch-Partenkirchen	Bischofshofen	Bischofshofen	Bischofshofen	Zakopane	Titisee-Neustadt	Titisee-Neustadt	Willingen	Willingen	Lahti	Lahti	Lillehammer	Oslo	Oslo	Oberstdorf	Oberstdorf	Planica	Planica				17
2021–22	–	–	–	–	–	–	–	–	–	–	–	–	–	–	–	–	–	–	–	29	43	49	q	q	–	–	16	–				17
