= Trusetal =

Former municipality in Thuringia, Germany

- Stadtteil of Brotterode-Trusetal
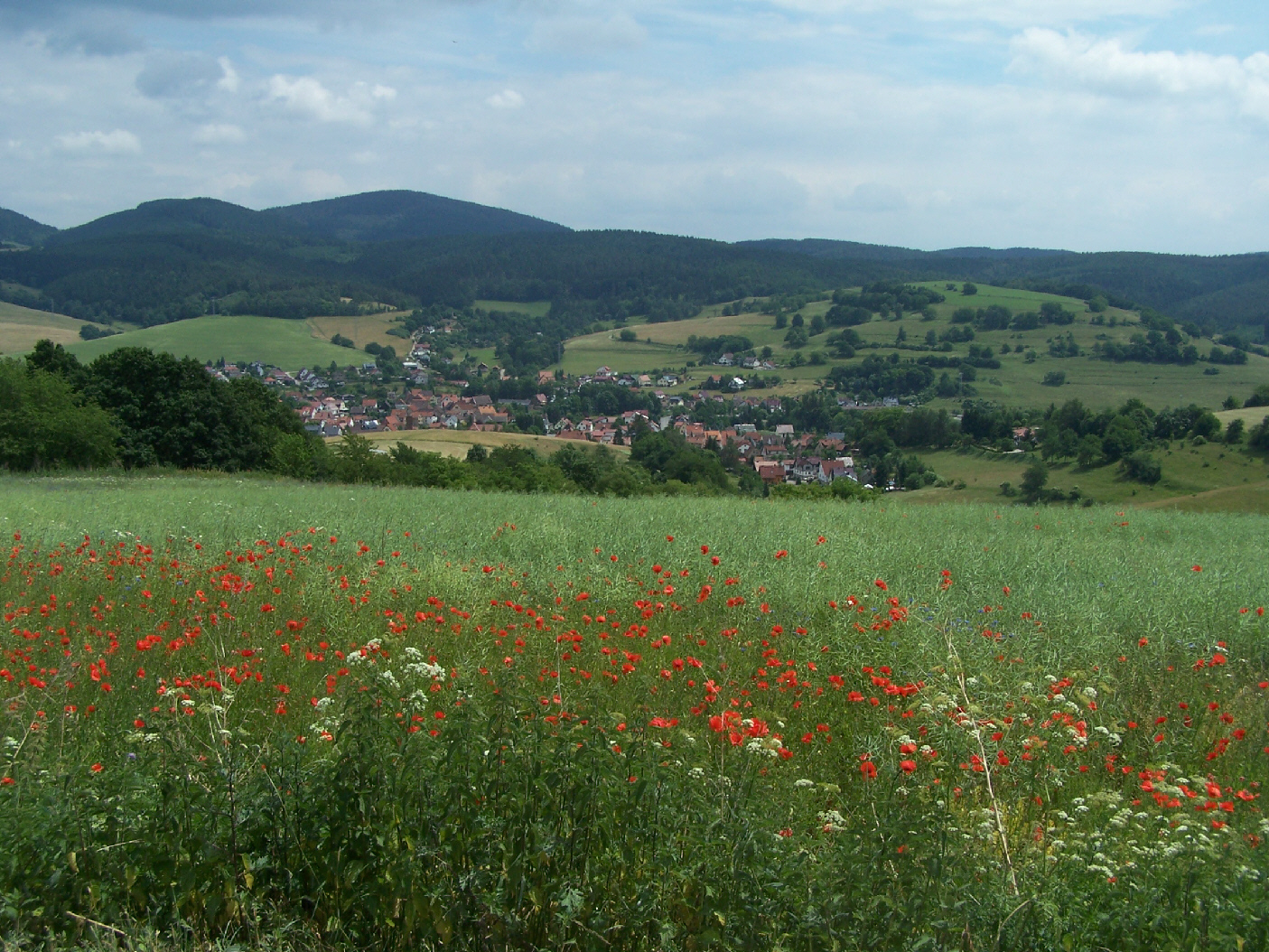
- Trusetal

- Coat of arms
- Interactive map of Trusetal
- Location within Germany Location within Thuringia
- Coordinates: 50°47′N 10°25′E
- Country: Germany
- State: Thuringia
- District: Schmalkalden-Meiningen
- Town: Brotterode-Trusetal

Area
  - Total: 25.88 km^{2} (9.99 sq mi)
- Elevation: 350 m (1,150 ft)

Population (2010-12-31)
  - Total: 3,914
  - Density: 151.2/km^{2} (391.7/sq mi)
- Time zone: UTC+01:00 (CET)
  - Summer (DST): UTC+02:00 (CEST)
- Postal codes: 98596
- Dialling codes: 03 68 40
- Vehicle registration: SM
- Website: www.trusetal.de

Trusetal (German pronunciation: [ˈtʁuːzəˌtaːl], lit. 'Truse Valley') is a former municipality in the district Schmalkalden-Meiningen, in Thuringia, Germany. Since 1 December 2011, it is part of the town Brotterode-Trusetal.

== Notable people ==
- Frank Ullrich
- Vicki Vomit
