= Brotterode-Trusetal =

- Town
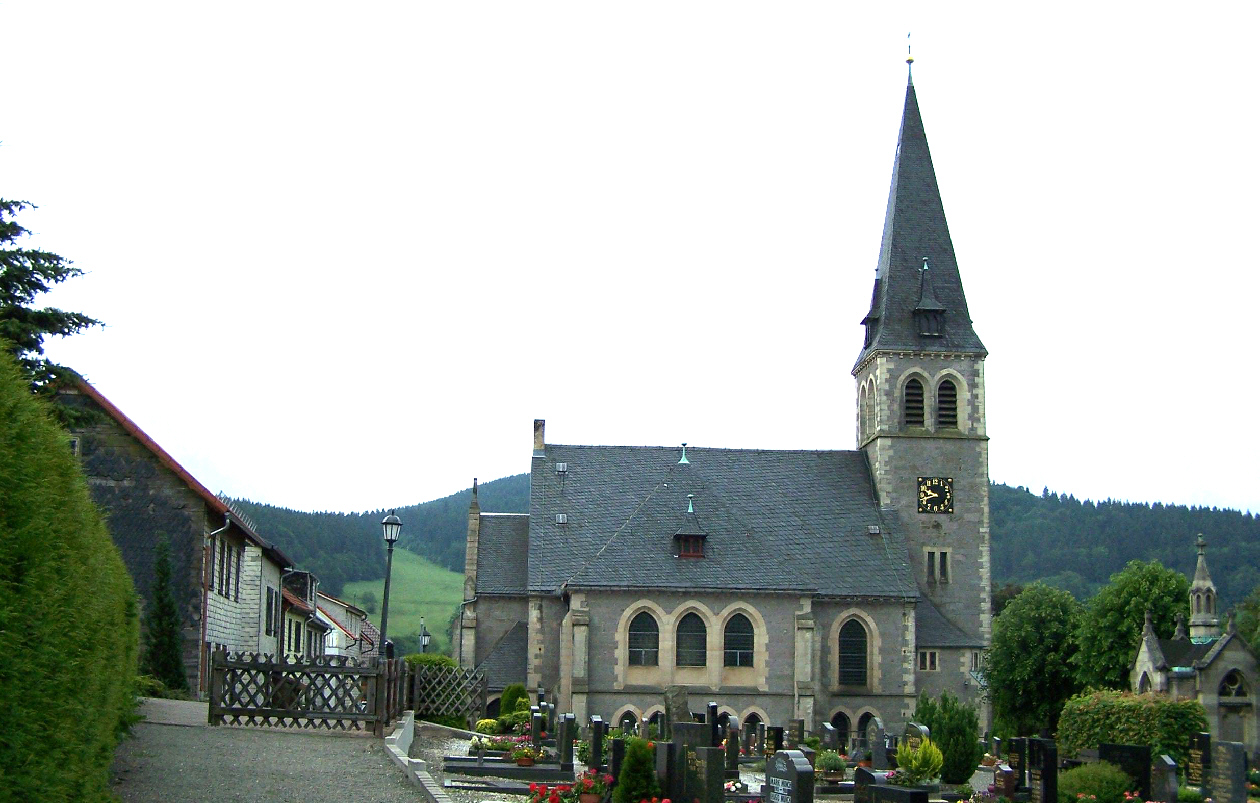
- Protestant church in Brotterode

- Coat of arms

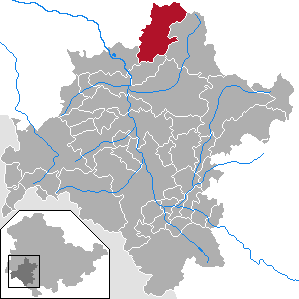
- Location of Brotterode-Trusetal within Schmalkalden-Meiningen district
- Interactive map of Brotterode-Trusetal
- Location within Germany Location within Thuringia
- Coordinates: 50°49′29.79″N 10°26′44.27″E
- Country: Germany
- State: Thuringia
- District: Schmalkalden-Meiningen

Government
  - Mayor (2019–25): Kay Goßmann

Area
  - Total: 49.68 km^{2} (19.18 sq mi)
- Elevation: 595 m (1,952 ft)

Population (2025-12-31)
  - Total: 5,571
  - Density: 112.1/km^{2} (290.4/sq mi)
- Time zone: UTC+01:00 (CET)
  - Summer (DST): UTC+02:00 (CEST)
- Postal codes: 98599
- Dialling codes: 036840
- Vehicle registration: SM

Brotterode-Trusetal (German pronunciation: [bʁɔtəˈʁoːdə ˈtʁuːzəˌtaːl]) is a town in the Schmalkalden-Meiningen district, in Thuringia, Germany. It was formed on 1 December 2011 by the merger of the former municipalities Brotterode and Trusetal.

== Notable people ==
- Mathias Jung
