= Brotterode =

Townl in Thuringia, Germany

- Stadtteil of Brotterode-Trusetal
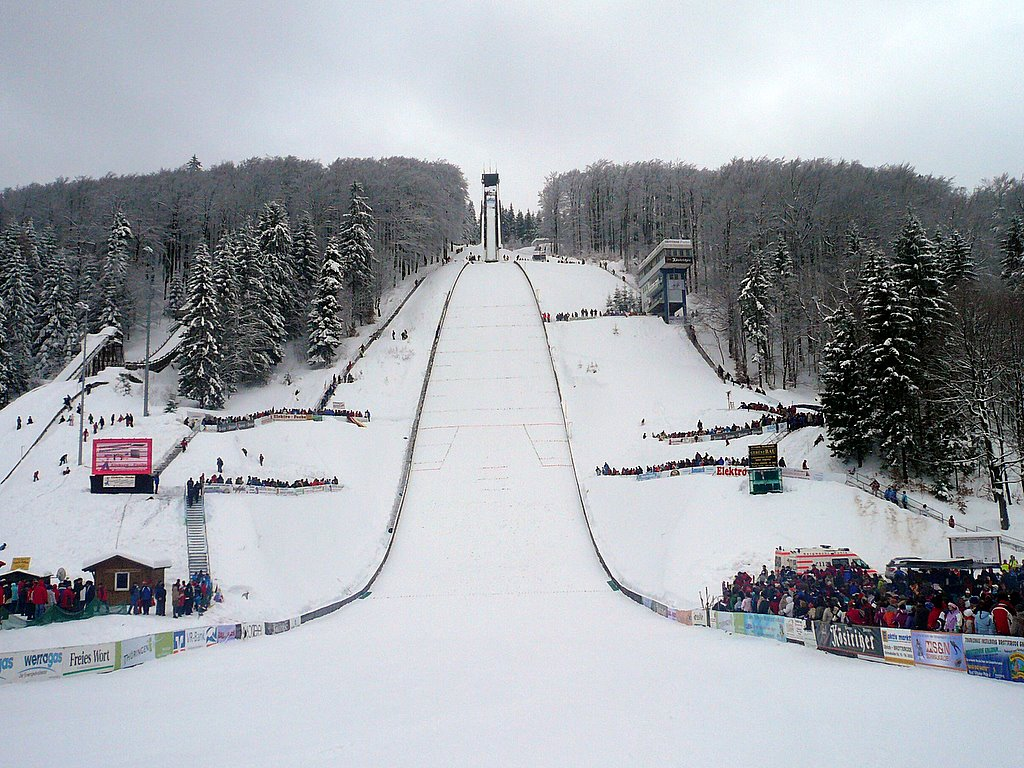
- Inselbergschanze in Brotterode

- Coat of arms
- Interactive map of Brotterode
- Location within Germany Location within Thuringia
- Coordinates: 50°50′N 10°26′E
- Country: Germany
- State: Thuringia
- District: Schmalkalden-Meiningen
- Town: Brotterode-Trusetal

Area
  - Total: 23.81 km^{2} (9.19 sq mi)
- Elevation: 595 m (1,952 ft)

Population (2010-12-31)
  - Total: 2,750
  - Density: 115/km^{2} (299/sq mi)
- Time zone: UTC+01:00 (CET)
  - Summer (DST): UTC+02:00 (CEST)
- Postal codes: 98599
- Dialling codes: 036840
- Vehicle registration: SM

Brotterode (German pronunciation: [bʁɔtəˈʁoːdə]) is a town and a former municipality next to the Rennsteig in the Thuringian Forest, in the Schmalkalden-Meiningen district, in Thuringia, central Germany. Since 1 December 2011, it is part of the town Brotterode-Trusetal. It is situated 11 km north of Schmalkalden, and 19 km southeast of Eisenach.

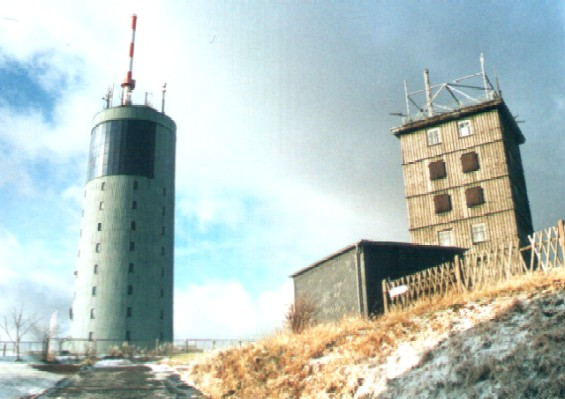
New Telecom-Tower and old Weather-Station-Tower on the Großer Inselberg.

== History ==
Brotterode was first mentioned in 1039 under the name of "Brunuwardesrot". In the Middle Ages (around 1360) it was the residence of a Vogt. In 1583 it became a possession of the Landgrave of Hesse. Before World War II, it was part of the Prussian province of Hesse-Nassau.

In 1895, the Great Fire of Brotterode almost completely destroyed the village. 729 out of 842 buildings were burned down, but the village was gradually rebuilt in the following years. In 1936 Brotterode obtained city rights.

Today Brotterode is famous for tourism, winter sports, and hiking.

== Main sights ==
Next to Brotterode is the Großer Inselsberg which is, with 916.5 meters, one of the highest mountains in the Thuringian Forest.

Named after it is the ski jumping hill Inselbergschanze with a current record of 123.5 meters.

== International relations ==
Brotterode is twinned with:

- Bad Vilbel, Germany
- Saint-Martin-le-Vinoux, France

== Notable people ==
- Hans-Georg Aschenbach
- Theodor Ilgen
- Axel Lesser
- Ingo Lesser
