= Jernej Damjan =

Slovenian ski jumper (born 1983)

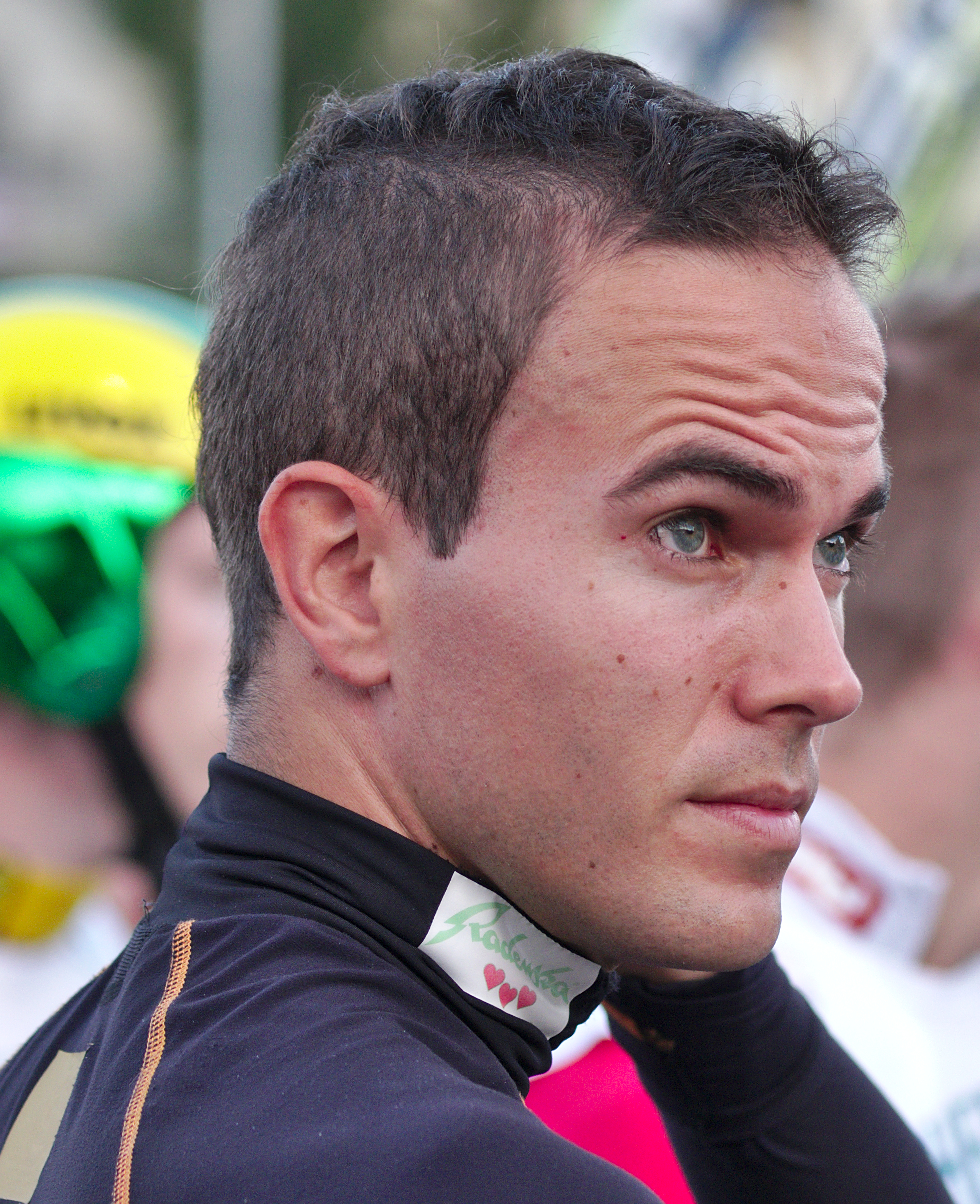
- Damjan in 2014

Personal information
- Born: 28 May 1983 (age 43) Ljubljana, SR Slovenia, SFR Yugoslavia
- Height: 1.71 m (5 ft 7 in)

Sport
- Sport: Ski jumping

World Cup career
- Seasons: 2004–2015; 2017–2019
- Indiv. starts: 271
- Indiv. podiums: 8
- Indiv. wins: 2
- Team starts: 38
- Team podiums: 9
- Team wins: 2

Achievements and titles
- Personal bests: 228.5 m (750 ft); Kulm, 13 January 2018
Medal record
Men's ski jumping
FIS Nordic World Ski Championships
Bronze medal – third place	2005 Oberstdorf	Team NH
Bronze medal – third place	2011 Oslo	Team LH
Men's ski flying
FIS Ski Flying World Championships
Silver medal – second place	2018 Oberstdorf	Team
Bronze medal – third place	2012 Vikersund	Team

Jernej Damjan (born 28 May 1983) is a Slovenian former ski jumper.

== Career ==
Damjan won a bronze medal in the team normal hill event at the 2005 FIS Nordic World Ski Championships in Oberstdorf, and finished 6th in the individual normal hill event. His best individual finish at the Winter Olympics was 9th place in the normal hill event at the 2014 Winter Olympics. His best individual finish at the FIS Ski Flying World Championships was 12th place in 2008.

== Tournament results ==
=== Olympic Games ===
Event	Normal hill	Large hill	Team event
Representing Slovenia
(Italy) 2006 Turin	35	28	10
(Canada) 2010 Vancouver	38	33	—
(Russia) 2014 Sochi	9	17	5
(South Korea) 2018 Pyeongchang	28	16	5

=== World Championships ===
2 medals (2 bronze)

Event	Normal hill	Large hill	Team (NH)	Team (LH)	Mixed team
Representing Slovenia
(Germany) 2005 Oberstdorf	6	13	3rd place, bronze medalist(s)	4	—N/a
(Japan) 2007 Sapporo	25	45	—N/a	10	—N/a
(Czech Republic) 2009 Liberec	41	37	—N/a	7	—N/a
(Norway) 2011 Oslo	51	13	6	3rd place, bronze medalist(s)	—N/a
(Sweden) 2015 Falun	23	25	—N/a	6	—
(Finland) 2017 Lahti	32	21	—N/a	5	—
(Austria) 2019 Seefeld	11	—	—N/a	—	—

=== Ski Flying World Championships ===
2 medals (1 silver, 1 bronze)

Event	Individual	Team
Representing Slovenia
(Austria) 2006 Tauplitz/Bad Mitterndorf	25	5
(Germany) 2008 Oberstdorf	12	12
(Slovenia) 2010 Planica	25	6
(Norway) 2012 Vikersund	41	3rd place, bronze medalist(s)
(Czech Republic) 2014 Harrachov	33	—N/a
(Germany) 2018 Oberstdorf	15	2nd place, silver medalist(s)

== World Cup ==
=== Standings ===
Season	Overall	4H	SF	RA	W5	P7	NT
2003–04	55	—	N/A	N/A	N/A	N/A	48
2004–05	15	23	N/A	N/A	N/A	N/A	17
2005–06	25	71	N/A	N/A	N/A	N/A	19
2006–07	23	26	N/A	N/A	N/A	N/A	27
2007–08	15	18	N/A	N/A	N/A	N/A	34
2008–09	37	38	30	N/A	N/A	N/A	32
2009–10	31	18	33	N/A	N/A	N/A	34
2010–11	41	—	38	N/A	N/A	N/A	N/A
2011–12	33	26	—	N/A	N/A	N/A	N/A
2012–13	—	—	—	N/A	N/A	N/A	N/A
2013–14	13	37	21	N/A	N/A	N/A	N/A
2014–15	14	22	15	N/A	N/A	N/A	N/A
2016–17	28	27	18	22	N/A	N/A	N/A
2017–18	17	10	33	15	18	30	N/A
2018–19	46	39	—	65	33	56	N/A

=== Individual wins ===
No.	Season	Date	Location	Hill	Size
1	2013–14	26 January 2014	(Japan) Sapporo	Ōkurayama HS134	LH
2	2017–18	26 November 2017	(Finland) Kuusamo	Rukatunturi HS142	LH
