= 2014–15 FIS Ski Jumping World Cup =

Sporting competition

Discipline	Men	Women
Overall	(Germany) Severin Freund	(Austria) Daniela Iraschko-Stolz
Nations Cup	Germany	Austria
Ski flying	(Slovenia) Peter Prevc	—
Four Hills Tournament	(Austria) Stefan Kraft	—

Competition
Edition	36th	4th
Locations	21	8
Individual	31	13
Team	5	—
Cancelled	1	1
Rescheduled	4	0

The 2014–15 FIS Ski Jumping World Cup was the 36th World Cup season in ski jumping for men, the 18th official World Cup season in ski flying and the 4th World Cup season for women.

Season began on 22 November 2014 and ended on 22 March 2015 in Planica, Slovenia. Women's WC began on 5 December 2014 in Lillehammer, Norway and ended on 13 March 2015 in Oslo, Norway.

Severin Freund won the World Cup overall for the first time. Freund and Prevc ended the season with the identical number of points but Freund was awarded the title on the basis of higher number of wins during the season (nine for Freund and three for Prevc). And the men's Nations Cup was taken by Team of Germany.

Peter Prevc (20 March) and Jurij Tepeš (22 March) became the sixth and seventh man in ski jumping history to achieve a "perfect jump", with all five judges awarding them top style marks (5x20). Both of those marks were awarded at the season final in Planica.

February 2015 saw an improvement of the world record in ski jumping distance. On 14 February, Peter Prevc set the new mark with 250 m (820 ft) in Vikersund, Norway. His achievement was beaten the next day by Anders Fannemel from Norway with 251 m (823 ft), which was the world record until March 2017. Russian ski jumper Dmitri Vassiliev jumped 254 metres (833 ft), then longest ever, but crashed on the back and didn't count it.

The 63rd Four Hills Tournament offered extra prize money. Stefan Kraft won it for the first time, followed by Michael Hayböck and Peter Prevc.

In women's World cup Daniela Iraschko-Stolz won her first overall title and Austria won their first Nations cup.

== World records ==
List of world record distances (both official and invalid) achieved within this World Cup season.

Date	Athlete	Hill	Round	Place	Metres	Feet
14 February 2015	(Slovenia) Peter Prevc	Vikersundbakken HS225	Final	Vikersund, Norway	250	820
15 February 2015	(Russia) Dmitri Vassiliev	Vikersundbakken HS225	Qualifying	Vikersund, Norway	254	833
15 February 2015	(Norway) Anders Fannemel	Vikersundbakken HS225	First	Vikersund, Norway	251.5	825

Longest jump in history at that time, but invalid due to Vassiliev falling upon landing.

== Map of world cup hosts ==
Europe
Germany	Austria	Asia

== Men's Individual ==
=== Calendar ===
N – normal hill / L – large hill / F – flying hill
All	No.	Date	Place (Hill)	Size	Winner	Second	Third	Overall leader	R.
840	1	23 November 2014	(Germany) Klingenthal (Vogtland Arena HS140)	L _{592}	(Czech Republic) Roman Koudelka	(Austria) Stefan Kraft	(Germany) Andreas Wellinger	(Czech Republic) Roman Koudelka	
841	2	28 November 2014	(Finland) Ruka (Rukatunturi HS142)	L _{593}	(Switzerland) Simon Ammann	(Japan) Daiki Ito	(Japan) Noriaki Kasai	(Switzerland) Simon Ammann	
842	3	29 November 2014	(Finland) Ruka (Rukatunturi HS142)	L _{594}	(Switzerland) Simon Ammann (Japan) Noriaki Kasai		(Germany) Severin Freund	(Switzerland) Simon Ammann	
843	4	6 December 2014	(Norway) Lillehammer (Lysgårdsbakken HS138)	L _{595}	(Austria) G. Schlierenzauer	(Norway) Anders Fannemel	(Austria) Michael Hayböck	(Switzerland) Simon Ammann	
844	5	(Note: Men's individual cancelled event in Lillehammer (7 December) had only one round.)7 December 2014	(Norway) Lillehammer (Lysgårdsbakken HS138)	L _{596}	(Czech Republic) Roman Koudelka	(Slovenia) Peter Prevc	(Austria) Michael Hayböck	(Czech Republic) Roman Koudelka	
845	6	13 December 2014	(Russia) Nizhny Tagil (Tramplin Stork HS134)	L _{597}	(Norway) Anders Fannemel	(Austria) G. Schlierenzauer	(Germany) Severin Freund	(Norway) Anders Fannemel	
846	7	(Note: Men's individual cancelled event in Nizhny Tagil (14 December) had only one round.)14 December 2014	(Russia) Nizhny Tagil (Tramplin Stork HS134)	L _{598}	(Germany) Severin Freund	(Norway) Anders Fannemel	(Austria) Stefan Kraft	(Norway) Anders Fannemel	
847	8	20 December 2014	(Switzerland) Engelberg (Gross-Titlis HS137)	L _{599}	(Germany) Richard Freitag	(Czech Republic) Roman Koudelka	(Austria) Michael Hayböck (Slovenia) Jernej Damjan	(Norway) Anders Fannemel	
848	9	21 December 2014	(Switzerland) Engelberg (Gross-Titlis HS137)	L _{600}	(Czech Republic) Roman Koudelka	(Switzerland) Simon Ammann	(Austria) Michael Hayböck	(Norway) Anders Fannemel	
		28 December 2014	(Germany) Oberstdorf (Schattenberg HS137)	L _{cnx}	cancelled due to strong wind and snowfall and moved on next day			—	
849	10	(Note: Men's individual cancelled event due to strong wind in Oberstdorf (28 December) was rescheduled to 29 December.)29 December 2014	(Germany) Oberstdorf (Schattenberg HS137)	L _{601}	(Austria) Stefan Kraft	(Austria) Michael Hayböck	(Slovenia) Peter Prevc	(Austria) Michael Hayböck	
850	11	1 January 2015	(Germany) Garmisch-Pa (Gr. Olympiaschanze HS140)	L _{602}	(Norway) Anders Jacobsen	(Switzerland) Simon Ammann	(Slovenia) Peter Prevc	(Austria) Michael Hayböck	
851	12	4 January 2015	(Austria) Innsbruck (Bergiselschanze HS130)	L _{603}	(Germany) Richard Freitag	(Austria) Stefan Kraft	(Switzerland) Simon Ammann (Japan) Noriaki Kasai	(Austria) Michael Hayböck	
852	13	6 January 2015	(Austria) Bischofshofen (Paul-Ausserleitner HS140)	L _{604}	(Austria) Michael Hayböck	(Japan) Noriaki Kasai	(Austria) Stefan Kraft	(Austria) Michael Hayböck	
63rd Four Hills Tournament Overall (29 December 2014 – 6 January 2015)					(Austria) Stefan Kraft	(Austria) Michael Hayböck	(Slovenia) Peter Prevc	4H Tournament	
853	14	10 January 2015	(Austria) Bad Mitterndorf (Kulm HS225)	F _{100}	(Germany) Severin Freund	(Austria) Stefan Kraft	(Slovenia) Jurij Tepeš	(Austria) Michael Hayböck	
		11 January 2015	(Austria) Bad Mitterndorf (Kulm HS225)	F _{cnx}	cancelled due to strong wind			—	
854	15	(Note: Men's individual event in Wisła (15 January) had only one round.)15 January 2015	(Poland) Wisła (Malinka HS134)	L _{605}	(Austria) Stefan Kraft	(Slovenia) Peter Prevc	(Germany) Severin Freund	(Austria) Stefan Kraft	
855	16	18 January 2015	(Poland) Zakopane (Wielka Krokiew HS134)	L _{606}	(Poland) Kamil Stoch	(Austria) Stefan Kraft	(Germany) Severin Freund	(Austria) Stefan Kraft	
856	17	24 January 2015	(Japan) Sapporo (Ōkurayama HS134)	L _{607}	(Slovenia) Peter Prevc	(Austria) Stefan Kraft	(Czech Republic) Roman Koudelka	(Austria) Stefan Kraft	
857	18	25 January 2015	(Japan) Sapporo (Ōkurayama HS134)	L _{608}	(Czech Republic) Roman Koudelka	(Poland) Kamil Stoch	(Slovenia) Peter Prevc	(Austria) Stefan Kraft	
858	19	30 January 2015	(Germany) Willingen (Mühlenkopfschanze HS145)	L _{609}	(Poland) Kamil Stoch	(Slovenia) Peter Prevc	(Germany) Severin Freund	(Austria) Stefan Kraft	
859	20	1 February 2015	(Germany) Willingen (Mühlenkopfschanze HS145)	L _{610}	(Germany) Severin Freund	(Norway) Rune Velta	(Czech Republic) Roman Koudelka	(Austria) Stefan Kraft	
		7 February 2015	(Czech Republic) Liberec (Ještěd "A" HS134)	L _{cnx}	cancelled due to financial and TV problems (both events rescheduled to Titisee-Neustadt on same dates)			—	
		8 February 2015	(Czech Republic) Liberec (Ještěd "A" HS134)	L _{cnx}	cancelled due to financial and TV problems (both events rescheduled to Titisee-Neustadt on same dates)			—	
860	21	(Note: Men's individual cancelled event from Liberec (7 February) was rescheduled to Titisee-Neustadt on same day.)7 February 2015	(Germany) Titisee-Neustadt (Hochfirstschanze HS142)	L _{611}	(Germany) Severin Freund	(Austria) Stefan Kraft	(Slovenia) Peter Prevc	(Austria) Stefan Kraft	
861	22	(Note: Men's individual cancelled event from Liberec (8 February) was rescheduled to Titisee-Neustadt on same day.)8 February 2015	(Germany) Titisee-Neustadt (Hochfirstschanze HS142)	L _{612}	(Norway) Anders Fannemel	(Poland) Kamil Stoch	(Czech Republic) Roman Koudelka	(Austria) Stefan Kraft	
862	23	14 February 2015	(Norway) Vikersund (Vikersundbakken HS225)	F _{101}	(Slovenia) Peter Prevc	(Norway) Anders Fannemel	(Japan) Noriaki Kasai	(Slovenia) Peter Prevc	
863	24	15 February 2015	(Norway) Vikersund (Vikersundbakken HS225)	F _{102}	(Germany) Severin Freund	(Norway) Anders Fannemel	(Norway) J. André Forfang	(Slovenia) Peter Prevc	
FIS Nordic World Ski Championships 2015 (21 – 26 February • (Sweden) Falun)
864	25	8 March 2015	(Finland) Lahti (Salpausselkä HS130)	L _{613}	(Austria) Stefan Kraft	(Germany) Severin Freund	(Norway) Anders Fannemel	(Slovenia) Peter Prevc	
		10 March 2015	(Finland) Kuopio (Puijo HS127 / 100)	L _{cnx}	due to strong wind rescheduled to normal hill			—	
865	26	(Note: Men's individual cancelled large hill HS127 event due to strong wind in Kuopio (10 March) was rescheduled to normal hill HS100. With only one round held.)10 March 2015	(Finland) Kuopio (Puijo HS127 / 100)	N _{150}	(Germany) Severin Freund	(Norway) Anders Bardal	(Austria) Stefan Kraft (Switzerland) Simon Ammann	(Austria) Stefan Kraft	
866	27	12 March 2015	(Norway) Trondheim (Granåsen HS140)	L _{614}	(Germany) Severin Freund	(Slovenia) Peter Prevc	(Norway) Rune Velta	(Germany) Severin Freund	
867	28	14 March 2015	(Norway) Oslo (Holmenkollbakken HS134)	L _{615}	(Germany) Severin Freund	(Slovenia) Peter Prevc	(Norway) Rune Velta	(Germany) Severin Freund	
868	29	15 March 2015	(Norway) Oslo (Holmenkollbakken HS134)	L _{616}	(Germany) Severin Freund	(Japan) Noriaki Kasai	(Slovenia) Peter Prevc (Poland) Kamil Stoch	(Germany) Severin Freund	
869	30	20 March 2015	(Slovenia) Planica (Letalnica b. Gorišek HS225)	F _{103}	(Slovenia) Peter Prevc	(Slovenia) Jurij Tepeš	(Austria) Stefan Kraft	(Germany) Severin Freund	
870	31	22 March 2015	(Slovenia) Planica (Letalnica b. Gorišek HS225)	F _{104}	(Slovenia) Jurij Tepeš	(Slovenia) Peter Prevc	(Norway) Rune Velta	(Germany) Severin Freund	
36th FIS World Cup Men's Overall (23 November 2014 – 22 March 2015)					(Germany) Severin Freund	(Slovenia) Peter Prevc	(Austria) Stefan Kraft	World Cup Overall	

=== Standings ===
==== Overall ====
Rank	after 31 events	Points
1	(Germany) Severin Freund (9 wins)	1729
2	(Slovenia) Peter Prevc (3 wins)	1729
3	(Austria) Stefan Kraft	1578
4	(Norway) Anders Fannemel	1161
5	(Austria) Michael Hayböck	1157
6	(Japan) Noriaki Kasai	1137
7	(Czech Republic) Roman Koudelka	1113
8	(Norway) Rune Velta	848
9	(Poland) Kamil Stoch	820
10	(Austria) Gregor Schlierenzauer	739

==== Nations Cup ====
Rank	after 36 events	Points
1	Germany	5533
2	Norway	5469
3	Austria	5193
4	Slovenia	4994
5	Japan	3501
6	Poland	2282
7	Czech Republic	1839
8	Switzerland	950
9	Finland	760
10	Russia	487

==== Prize money ====
Rank	after 36 events	CHF
1	(Germany) Severin Freund	198,900
2	(Slovenia) Peter Prevc	194,300
3	(Austria) Stefan Kraft	188,300
4	(Norway) Anders Fannemel	136,850
5	(Austria) Michael Hayböck	129,950
6	(Japan) Noriaki Kasai	122,200
7	(Czech Republic) Roman Koudelka	111,000
8	(Norway) Rune Velta	105,700
9	(Germany) Richard Freitag	88,200
10	(Poland) Kamil Stoch	84,900

==== Ski Flying ====
Rank	after 5 events	Points
1	(Slovenia) Peter Prevc	345
2	(Germany) Severin Freund	336
3	(Slovenia) Jurij Tepeš	287
4	(Japan) Noriaki Kasai	227
5	(Norway) Rune Velta	200
6	(Norway) Anders Fannemel	197
7	(Austria) Stefan Kraft	190
8	(Norway) Johann André Forfang	151
9	(Germany) Michael Neumayer	107
10	(Japan) Daiki Ito	99

==== Four Hills Tournament ====
Rank	after 4 events	Points
1	(Austria) Stefan Kraft	1106.7
2	(Austria) Michael Hayböck	1100.7
3	(Slovenia) Peter Prevc	1077.2
4	(Japan) Noriaki Kasai	1074.8
5	(Norway) Anders Jacobsen	1060.1
6	(Germany) Richard Freitag	1056.8
7	(Austria) Gregor Schlierenzauer	1050.2
8	(Germany) Severin Freund	1022.5
9	(Czech Republic) Roman Koudelka	1013.4
10	(Poland) Kamil Stoch	1009.4

== Women's Individual ==
=== Calendar ===
N – normal hill / L – large hill
All	No.	Date	Place (Hill)	Size	Winner	Second	Third	Overall leader	Ref.
48	1	5 December 2014	(Norway) Lillehammer (Lysgårdsbakken HS100)	N _{045}	(Slovenia) Špela Rogelj	(Austria) Daniela Iraschko-Stolz	(Japan) Sara Takanashi	(Slovenia) Špela Rogelj	
49	2	10 January 2015	(Japan) Sapporo (Miyanomori HS100)	N _{046}	(Japan) Sara Takanashi	(Austria) Daniela Iraschko-Stolz	(Slovenia) Špela Rogelj	(Slovenia) Špela Rogelj (Japan) Sara Takanashi (Austria) D. Iraschko-Stolz	
50	3	11 January 2015	(Japan) Sapporo (Miyanomori HS100)	N _{047}	(Japan) Sara Takanashi	(Germany) Carina Vogt	(Austria) Chiara Hölzl	(Japan) Sara Takanashi	
		17 January 2015	(Japan) Zaō (Yamagata HS100)	N _{cnx}	cancelled due to strong wind and postponed on next day			—	
		(Note: Women's individual cancelled event from Zaō (17 January) rescheduled to 18 January was finally cancelled.)18 January 2015	(Japan) Zaō (Yamagata HS100)	N _{cnx}	the rescheduled event finally cancelled due to bad weather			—	
51	4	(Note: Women's individual event in Zaō (18 January) had only one round.)18 January 2015	(Japan) Zaō (Yamagata HS100)	N _{048}	(Germany) Carina Vogt	(Russia) Irina Avvakumova	(Slovenia) Špela Rogelj	(Japan) Sara Takanashi	
52	5	24 January 2015	(Germany) Oberstdorf (Schattenberg HS106)	N _{049}	(Austria) Daniela Iraschko-Stolz	(Germany) Carina Vogt	(Japan) Sara Takanashi	(Japan) Sara Takanashi	
53	6	25 January 2015	(Germany) Oberstdorf (Schattenberg HS106)	N _{050}	(Austria) Daniela Iraschko-Stolz	(Germany) Carina Vogt	(Canada) Taylor Henrich	(Austria) D. Iraschko-Stolz	
54	7	31 January 2015	(Austria) Hinzenbach (Aigner-Schanze HS94)	N _{051}	(Austria) Daniela Iraschko-Stolz	(Germany) Carina Vogt	(Japan) Sara Takanashi	(Austria) D. Iraschko-Stolz	
55	8	1 February 2015	(Austria) Hinzenbach (Aigner-Schanze HS94)	N _{052}	(Germany) Carina Vogt	(Austria) Daniela Iraschko-Stolz	(Slovenia) Špela Rogelj	(Austria) D. Iraschko-Stolz	
56	9	7 February 2015	(Romania) Râșnov (Trambulina Valea HS100)	N _{053}	(Austria) Daniela Iraschko-Stolz	(Japan) Sara Takanashi	(Norway) Maren Lundby	(Austria) D. Iraschko-Stolz	
57	10	(Note: Women's individual event in Râșnov (8 February) had only one round.)8 February 2015	(Romania) Râșnov (Trambulina Valea HS100)	N _{054}	(Japan) Sara Takanashi	(United States) Nita Englund	(Austria) Daniela Iraschko-Stolz	(Austria) D. Iraschko-Stolz	
58	11	14 February 2015	(Slovenia) Ljubno (Savina HS95)	N _{055}	(Japan) Sara Takanashi	(Austria) Daniela Iraschko-Stolz	(United States) Sarah Hendrickson	(Austria) D. Iraschko-Stolz	
59	12	15 February 2015	(Slovenia) Ljubno (Savina HS95)	N _{056}	(Austria) Daniela Iraschko-Stolz (Japan) Sara Takanashi		(United States) Sarah Hendrickson	(Austria) D. Iraschko-Stolz	
FIS Nordic World Ski Championships 2015 (20 February • (Sweden) Falun)
60	13	13 March 2015	(Norway) Oslo (Holmenkollbakken HS134)	L _{004}	(Japan) Sara Takanashi	(United States) Sarah Hendrickson	(Canada) Taylor Henrich	(Austria) D. Iraschko-Stolz	
4th FIS World Cup Women's Overall (5 December 2014 – 13 March 2015)					(Austria) Daniela Iraschko-Stolz	(Japan) Sara Takanashi	(Germany) Carina Vogt	World Cup Overall	

=== Standings ===
==== Overall ====
Rank	after 13 events	Points
1	(Austria) Daniela Iraschko-Stolz	1007
2	(Japan) Sara Takanashi	973
3	(Germany) Carina Vogt	672
4	(Slovenia) Špela Rogelj	581
5	(Japan) Yuki Ito	434
6	(Slovenia) Maja Vtič	418
7	(Austria) Eva Pinkelnig	408
8	(United States) Sarah Hendrickson	399
9	(Austria) J. Seifriedsberger	370
10	(United States) Nita Englund	332

==== Nations Cup ====
Rank	after 13 events	Points
1	Austria	1970
2	Japan	1638
3	Germany	1481
4	Slovenia	1337
5	United States	1013
6	Norway	659
7	Russia	490
8	France	368
9	Canada	230
10	Finland	121

==== Prize money ====
Rank	after 13 events	CHF
1	(Austria) Daniela Iraschko-Stolz	29,910
2	(Japan) Sara Takanashi	28,890
3	(Germany) Carina Vogt	20,160
4	(Slovenia) Špela Rogelj	17,430
5	(Japan) Yuki Ito	13,020
6	(Slovenia) Maja Vtič	12,540
7	(Austria) Eva Pinkelnig	12,240
8	(United States) Sarah Hendrickson	11,940
9	(Austria) J. Seifriedsberger	10,890
10	(United States) Nita Englund	9,495

== Team events ==
=== Calendar ===
All	No.	Date	Place (Hill)	Size	Winner	Second	Third	R.
Men's team
71	1	22 November 2014	(Germany) Klingenthal (Vogtland Arena HS140)	L _{054}	Germany Markus Eisenbichler; Richard Freitag; Andreas Wellinger; Severin Freund	Japan Reruhi Shimizu; Daiki Ito; Noriaki Kasai; Taku Takeuchi	Norway Rune Velta; Anders Jacobsen; Anders Fannemel; Anders Bardal	
72	2	17 January 2015	(Poland) Zakopane (Wielka Krokiew HS134)	L _{055}	Germany Michael Neumayer; Marinus Kraus; Richard Freitag; Severin Freund	Austria Michael Hayböck; Gregor Schlierenzauer; Thomas Diethart; Stefan Kraft	Slovenia Jurij Tepeš; Nejc Dežman; Jernej Damjan; Peter Prevc	
73	3	31 January 2015	(Germany) Willingen (Mühlenkopfschanze HS145)	L _{056}	Slovenia Jurij Tepeš; Nejc Dežman; Jernej Damjan; Peter Prevc	Germany Markus Eisenbichler; Marinus Kraus; Richard Freitag; Severin Freund	Norway Tom Hilde; Anders Jacobsen; Anders Fannemel; Rune Velta	
74	4	7 March 2015	(Finland) Lahti (Salpausselkä HS130)	L _{057}	Norway Anders Bardal; Anders Jacobsen; Anders Fannemel; Rune Velta	Germany Richard Freitag; Marinus Kraus; Markus Eisenbichler; Severin Freund	Japan Shōhei Tochimoto; Taku Takeuchi; Daiki Ito; Noriaki Kasai	
75	5	(Note: Men's team event in Planica (21 March) had only one round.)21 March 2015	(Slovenia) Planica (Letalnica bratov Gorišek HS225	F _{016}	Slovenia Jurij Tepeš; Anže Semenič; Robert Kranjec; Peter Prevc	Austria Stefan Kraft; Michael Hayböck; Manuel Poppinger; Gregor Schlierenzauer	Norway Johann André Forfang; Kenneth Gangnes; Anders Fannemel; Rune Velta	

== Achievements ==
First World Cup career victory

- (Czech Republic) Roman Koudelka (25), in his 9th season – the WC 1 in Klingenthal; first podium was 2010-11 WC 13 in Harrachov
- (Slovenia) Špela Rogelj (20), in her 4th season – the WC 1 in Lillehammer
- (Norway) Anders Fannemel (23), in his 5th season – the WC 6 in Nizhny Tagil; first podium was 2012-13 WC 2 in Lillehammer
- (Austria) Stefan Kraft (21), in his 4th season – the WC 10 in Oberstdorf; first podium was 2012-13 WC 11 in Bischofshofen
- (Austria) Michael Hayböck (23), in his 6th season – the WC 13 in Bischofshofen; first podium was 2013-14 WC 15 in Wisla
- (Germany) Carina Vogt (22), in her 4th season – the WC 4 in Zaō; first podium was 2012-13 WC 11 in Zaō

First World Cup podium

- (Slovenia) Špela Rogelj (20), in her 4th season
- (Austria) Chiara Hölzl (17), in her 3rd season - no. 3 in the WC 3 in Sapporo
- (Canada) Taylor Henrich (19), in her 4th season - no. 3 in the WC 6 in Oberstdorf
- (Norway) Johann André Forfang (19), in his 1st season - no. 3 in the WC 24 in Vikersund

Victory in this World Cup (in brackets victory for all time)

- (Germany) Severin Freund - 9 (18) first place
- (Japan) Sara Takanashi - 6 (30) first place
- (Austria) Daniela Iraschko-Stolz - 5 (10) first place
- (Czech Republic) Roman Koudelka - 4 (4) first place
- (Slovenia) Peter Prevc - 3 (6) first place
- (Austria) Stefan Kraft - 3 (3) first place
- (Switzerland) Simon Ammann - 2 (23) first place
- (Poland) Kamil Stoch - 2 (15) first place
- (Germany) Richard Freitag - 2 (5) first place
- (Germany) Carina Vogt - 2 (2) first place
- (Norway) Anders Fannemel - 2 (2) first place
- (Austria) Gregor Schlierenzauer - 1 (53) first place
- (Japan) Noriaki Kasai - 1 (17) first place
- (Norway) Anders Jacobsen - 1 (10) first place
- (Slovenia) Jurij Tepeš - 1 (2) first place
- (Slovenia) Špela Rogelj - 1 (1) first place
- (Austria) Michael Hayböck - 1 (1) first place

== See also ==
- 2014 Grand Prix (top level summer series)
- 2014–15 FIS Continental Cup (2nd level competition)
