= Valentin Bozhkov =

Bulgarian ski jumper (born 1958)

Valentin Bozhichkov (Bulgarian: Валентин Божичков, born May 2, 1958, in Samokov) is a Bulgarian ski jumper that competed in the 1984 Winter Olympics in Sarajevo. He took 37th place in the Normal hill (70 metres hill).
