= Phillip Sjøen =

Norwegian ski jumper (born 1995)

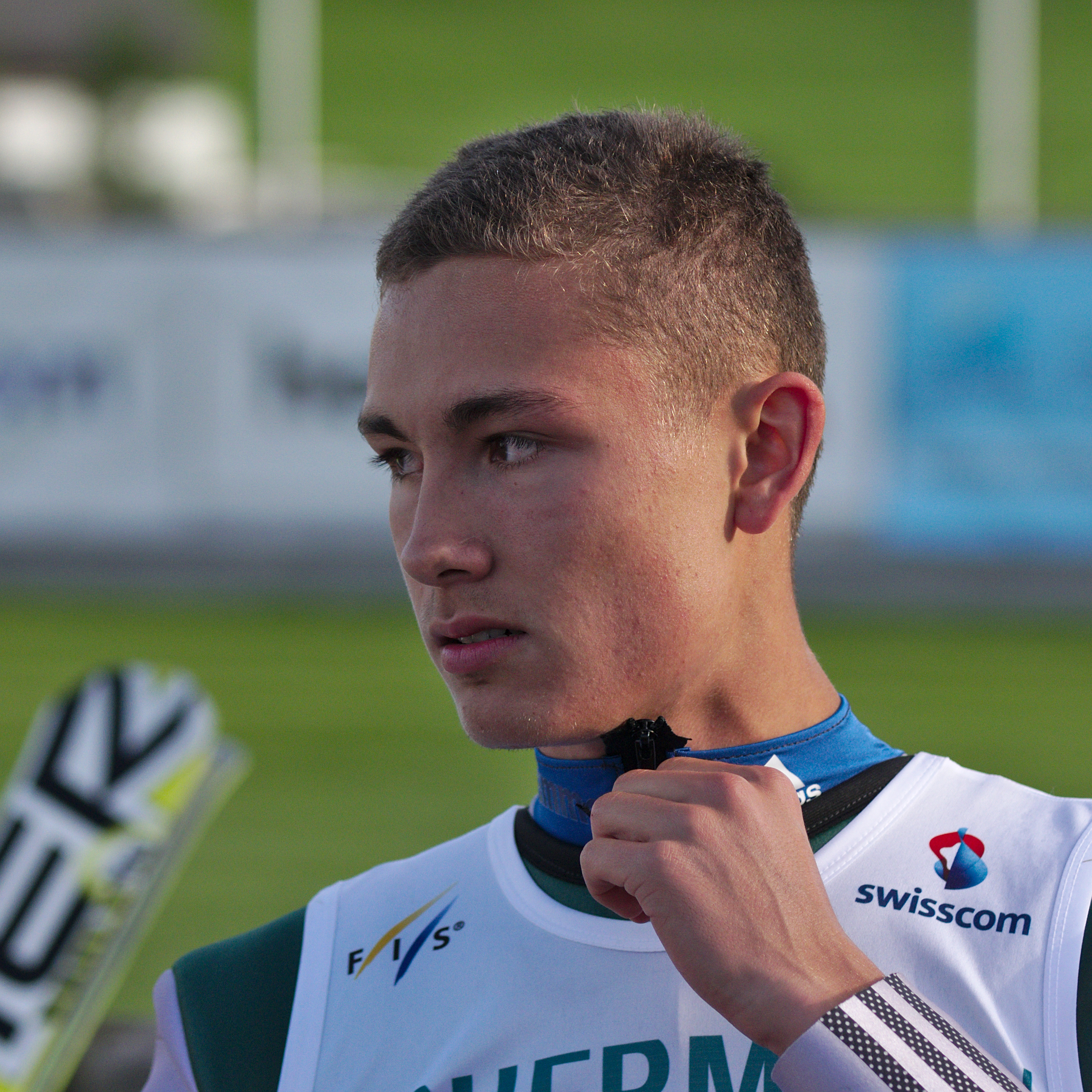

Personal information
- Full name: Phillip Sjøen
- Born: 24 December 1995 (age 30) Oslo, Norway

Sport
- Sport: Skiing
- Club: Bækkelagets SK

World Cup career
- Seasons: -
Medal record
Men's ski jumping
Representing Norway

Phillip Sjøen (born 24 December 1995) is a Norwegian former ski jumper.

He was born in Oslo, but resides in Fagerstrand.

Sjøen competed in the 2015 World Cup season.

He was selected to represent Norway at the FIS Nordic World Ski Championships 2015 in Falun.
