= Cene Prevc =

Slovenian ski jumper (born 1996)

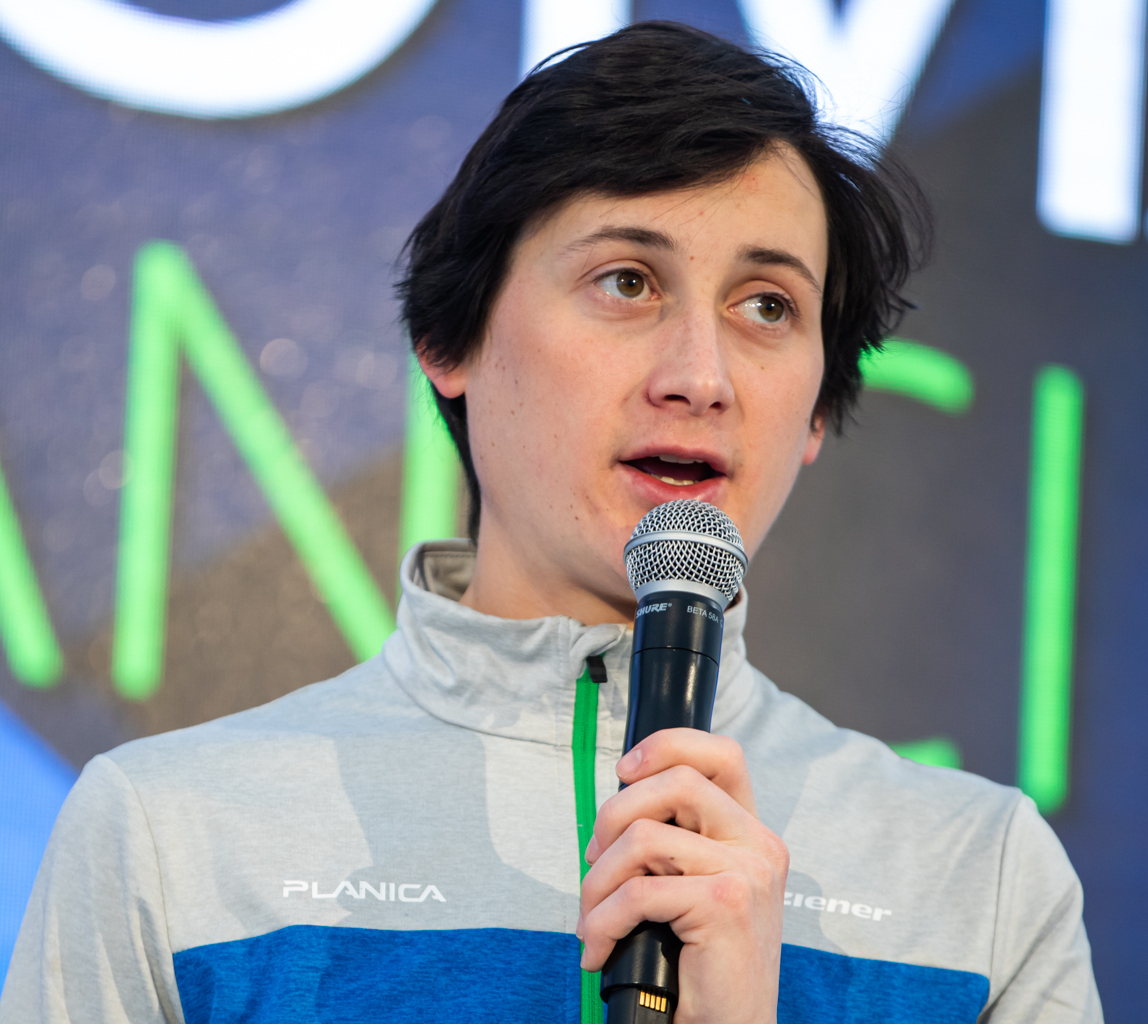
- Prevc in 2023

Personal information
- Born: 12 March 1996 (age 30) Kranj, Slovenia
- Height: 1.70 m (5 ft 7 in)

Sport
- Sport: Ski jumping

World Cup career
- Seasons: 2013–2018; 2020–2022
- Indiv. starts: 73
- Indiv. podiums: 1
- Team starts: 8
- Team podiums: 5
- Team wins: 1

Achievements and titles
- Personal bests: 246 m (807 ft); Planica, 27 March 2022
Medal record
Representing Slovenia
Men's ski jumping
Olympic Games
Silver medal – second place	2022 Beijing	Team LH

Cene Prevc (born 12 March 1996) is a retired Slovenian ski jumper.

== Career ==
On 18 February 2013, Prevc won the individual event at the 2013 European Youth Olympic Winter Festival (EYOF) with a combined points of 261.0. With this victory Cene followed the path of his brother Peter, who also won the EYOF individual event back in 2009. He made his World Cup debut in the 2013–14 season in Planica.

In 2022, he ended his ski jumping career to focus on his studies.

== Personal life ==
Prevc was born in Kranj to Božidar and Julijana Prevc; the family has since been living in the village of Dolenja Vas. He has two brothers and two sisters. Both of his brothers, Peter and Domen, and one of his sisters, Nika, are also FIS Ski Jumping World Cup jumpers. His youngest sister, Ema, does not ski jump, and instead practices ballet. His father, who owns a furniture business, is also an international ski jumping referee.

== World Cup results ==
=== Standings ===
Season	Overall	4H	SF	RA
2012–13	—	—	—	N/A
2013–14	70	—	—	N/A
2014–15	59	—	—	N/A
2015–16	—	—	—	N/A
2016–17	40	24	41	—
2017–18	—	—	—	—
2019–20	33	45	—	—
2020–21	38	26	27	N/A
2021–22	10	40	21	4

=== Individual starts ===
winner (1); second (2); third (3); did not compete (–); failed to qualify (q)
Season	1	2	3	4	5	6	7	8	9	10	11	12	13	14	15	16	17	18	19	20	21	22	23	24	25	26	27	28	29	30	31	Points
2012–13	Lillehammer	Lillehammer	Kuusamo	Krasnaja Polana	Krasnaja Polana	Engelberg	Engelberg	Oberstdorf	Garmisch-Partenkirchen	Innsbruck	Bischofshofen	Wisła	Zakopane	Sapporo	Sapporo	Vikersund	Vikersund	Harrachov	Harrachov	Klingenthal	Oberstdorf	Lahti	Kuopio	Trondheim	Oslo	Planica	Planica					0
2012–13	–	–	–	–	–	–	–	–	–	q	q	–	–	–	–	–	–	–	–	–	–	–	–	–	–	–	–					0
2013–14	Klingenthal	Kuusamo	Lillehammer	Lillehammer	Titisee-Neustadt	Titisee-Neustadt	Engelberg	Engelberg	Oberstdorf	Garmisch-Partenkirchen	Innsbruck	Bischofshofen	Tauplitz	Tauplitz	Wisła	Zakopane	Sapporo	Sapporo	Willingen	Willingen	Falun	Lahti	Lahti	Kuopio	Trondheim	Oslo	Planica	Planica				19
2013–14	–	–	–	–	–	–	–	–	–	–	–	–	–	–	–	–	–	–	–	–	–	–	–	–	–	–	16	27				19
2014–15	Klingenthal	Kuusamo	Kuusamo	Lillehammer	Lillehammer	Nizhny Tagil	Nizhny Tagil	Engelberg	Engelberg	Oberstdorf	Garmisch-Partenkirchen	Innsbruck	Bischofshofen	Tauplitz	Wisła	Zakopane	Sapporo	Sapporo	Willingen	Willingen	Titisee-Neustadt	Titisee-Neustadt	Vikersund	Vikersund	Lahti	Kuopio	Trondheim	Oslo	Oslo	Planica	Planica	27
2014–15	–	–	–	–	–	–	–	–	–	–	–	–	–	–	–	–	–	–	–	–	–	–	–	–	17	43	18	38	41	q	–	27
2015–16	Klingenthal	Lillehammer	Lillehammer	Nizhny Tagil	Nizhny Tagil	Engelberg	Engelberg	Oberstdorf	Garmisch-Partenkirchen	Innsbruck	Bischofshofen	Willingen	Zakopane	Sapporo	Sapporo	Trondheim	Vikersund	Vikersund	Vikersund	Lahti	Lahti	Kuopio	Almaty	Almaty	Wisła	Titisee-Neustadt	Planica	Planica	Planica			0
2015–16	–	–	–	–	–	–	–	–	–	–	–	–	–	–	–	–	–	–	–	–	–	–	–	–	–	–	46	q	–			0
2016–17	Kuusamo	Kuusamo	Klingenthal	Lillehammer	Lillehammer	Engelberg	Engelberg	Oberstdorf	Garmisch-Partenkirchen	Innsbruck	Bischofshofen	Wisła	Wisła	Zakopane	Willingen	Oberstdorf	Oberstdorf	Sapporo	Sapporo	Pyeongchang	Pyeongchang	Oslo	Trondheim	Vikersund	Planica	Planica						67
2016–17	–	–	–	–	–	30	29	8	24	40	34	26	q	21	28	33	24	44	40	36	42	–	–	–	q	–						67
2017–18	Wisła	Kuusamo	Nizhny Tagil	Nizhny Tagil	Titisee-Neustadt	Engelberg	Engelberg	Oberstdorf	Garmisch-Partenkirchen	Innsbruck	Bischofshofen	Tauplitz	Zakopane	Willingen	Willingen	Lahti	Oslo	Lillehammer	Trondheim	Vikersund	Planica	Planica										0
2017–18	–	–	–	–	–	–	–	–	–	–	–	–	–	–	–	–	–	–	–	–	39	–										0
2019–20	Wisła	Kuusamo	Nizhny Tagil	Nizhny Tagil	Klingenthal	Engelberg	Engelberg	Oberstdorf	Garmisch-Partenkirchen	Innsbruck	Bischofshofen	Val di Fiemme	Val di Fiemme	Titisee-Neustadt	Titisee-Neustadt	Zakopane	Sapporo	Sapporo	Willingen	Tauplitz	Tauplitz	Râșnov	Râșnov	Lahti	Lahti	Oslo	Lillehammer					112
2019–20	–	–	–	–	–	–	–	–	–	36	22	19	15	26	19	38	19	32	–	–	–	21	15	13	35	–	–					112
2020–21	Wisła	Ruka	Ruka	Nizhny Tagil	Nizhny Tagil	Engelberg	Engelberg	Oberstdorf	Garmisch-Partenkirchen	Innsbruck	Bischofshofen	Titisee-Neustadt	Titisee-Neustadt	Zakopane	Lahti	Willingen	Willingen	Klingenthal	Klingenthal	Szczyrk	Szczyrk	Râșnov	Planica	Planica	Planica							83
2020–21	–	–	–	–	–	37	10	19	29	23	q	37	36	24	–	–	–	–	–	–	–	17	26	22	–							83
2021–22	Nizhny Tagil	Nizhny Tagil	Ruka	Ruka	Wisła	Klingenthal	Klingenthal	Engelberg	Engelberg	Oberstdorf	Garmisch-Partenkirchen	Bischofshofen	Bischofshofen	Bischofshofen	Zakopane	Titisee-Neustadt	Titisee-Neustadt	Willingen	Willingen	Lahti	Lahti	Lillehammer	Oslo	Oslo	Oberstdorf	Oberstdorf	Planica	Planica				657
2021–22	8	5	20	5	6	22	7	11	13	27	15	–	–	–	12	6	17	14	3	9	10	7	5	6	24	37	29	7				657
