= Manuel Poppinger =

Austrian ski jumper

Medal record

Men's ski jumping

Representing Austria

World Championships
Silver medal – second place	2015 Falun	Team LH

Men's ski flying

FIS Ski Flying World Championships
Bronze medal – third place	2016 Bad Mitterndorf	Team

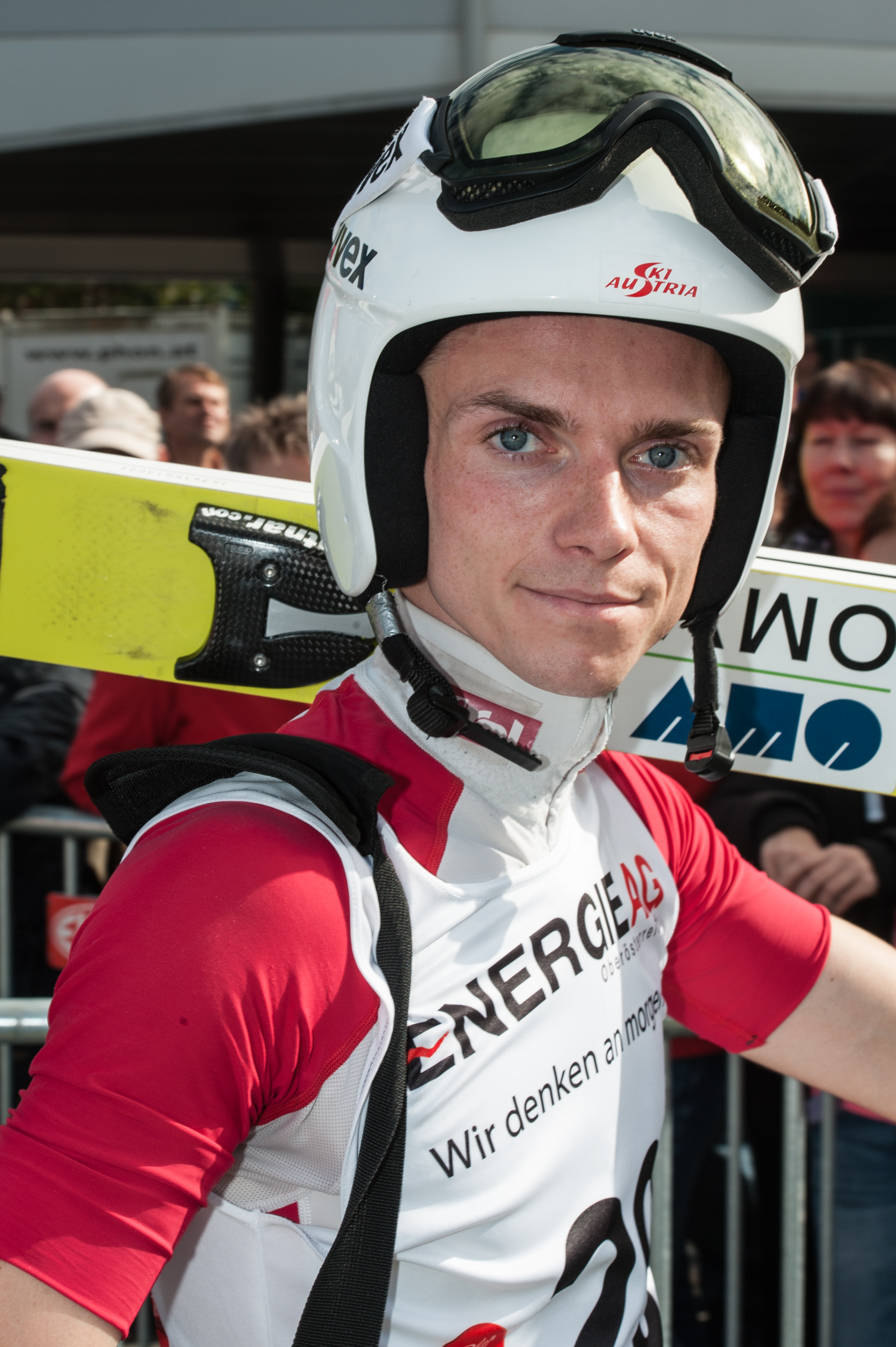
Manuel Poppinger in 2015

Manuel Poppinger (born 19 May 1989) is an Austrian ski jumper. His best World Cup finish was third in a team event in Zakopane in January 2014, while his best individual finish was eighth in Kulm.
