= List of ski jumping venues in the United States =

Ski jumping hills of U.S.

The following are ski jumping venues in the United States in current use for Nordic competition and training. USA Nordic Sport competition includes around 30 ski jumping clubs in 12 states. A venue may include multiple permanent jumps denoted by K point or hill size in meters. Some jumps have an artificial surface which allows ski jumping at any time of the year.

List of ski jumping venues in the United States
Venue	City	State	Hill sizes (m)	Built	Updated	Certification	Photo	Notes
Utah Olympic Park Jumps	Park City	Utah	HS134, HS100, K40, K10	2001		Olympics		
Lake Placid Olympic Ski Jumping Complex	Lake Placid	New York	HS128, HS100, K65, K48, K20, K10	1921	2021	Olympics		
Pine Mountain Jump	Iron Mountain	Michigan	HS133	1938	2020	Continental Cup		
Snowflake Ski Jump	Westby	Wisconsin	K106, K65, K40, K20, K10, K5	1961	1999	Four Hills SuperTour		
Harris Hill Ski Jump	Brattleboro	Vermont	HS98, 18, 10	1922	2009	FIS Cup		
Suicide Hill Ski Jump	Ishpeming	Michigan	HS96, HS66, K40, K25, K13	1925				
Norge Cary Hill	Fox River Grove	Illinois	HS77, 40, 22, 10, 5	1906	2003			
Howelsen Hill Ski Area	Steamboat Springs	Colorado	HS75		1977	Continental Cup		
Karl Eid Jumping Complex	Anchorage	Alaska	HS71, 40, 20, 10	1983	2018			
Bush Lake Ski Jump	Bloomington	Minnesota	70, 25, 10		2002			
Ole Mangseth Memorial Ski Jump	Coleraine	Minnesota	70, 40, 20, 10	1941	1989			
Satre Hill	Salisbury	Connecticut	K70, K20	1926	2010			Reconstructed K30 to return for 2026
Chester Krause Jump	Iola	Wisconsin	60, 40, 25, 15, 5	1996				
Blackhawk Ski Jump	Middleton	Wisconsin	60, 30, 15, 5		2020			
Mt. Washington Nordic Ski Complex	Eau Claire	Wisconsin	55, 30, 15, 7	2021				
Tri-Norse Ski Jump	Rome	Wisconsin	55, 22, 10, 5	1932				
Nansen Ski Jump	Milan	New Hampshire	K39, K20, K10	2021				Big Nansen Ski Jump Upgrade in progress
Storrs Hill	Lebanon	New Hampshire	50	1954	2017			
Carver Lake, Harrington Hill	Maplewood	Minnesota	K46, K30, K20, K10	1972				
Pine Valley Recreation Area	Cloquet	Minnesota	K40, K20, K10, K5	1963				
Proctor Academy Ski Hill	Andover	New Hampshire	K38, K30, K18, K10	1950				
Class of '77 Ski Jumping Complex at Vermont Academy	Saxtons River	Vermont	K35, K20, K10	1925	2002			private
Kennett Ski Jump	Albany	New Hampshire	K34, K20, K10, K5	1960	2020			
Roger Burt Memorial Ski Jumps, Oak Hill	Hanover	New Hampshire	K32, K20, K10		1981			
Gene Ross Memorial Ski Jump	Plymouth	New Hampshire	K28	2016				
"D" Hill	Leavenworth	Washington	27, 15	2003	2009			Bakke Hill closed in 1978
Cameron Ski Jump	Cameron	Wisconsin	7	2016				

== See also ==
- List of ski jumping hills#United States
- U.S. National Ski Jumping Championships
- Freestyle skiing
- U.S. Ski & Snowboard
