= U.S. National Ski Jumping Championships =

Annual sports competition

U.S. National Championship

Tournament information
- Sport: Ski jumping
- Location: United States
- Established: 1905
- Administrator: National Ski Association of America, United States Ski Association, U.S. Ski & Snowboard

U.S. National Ski Jumping Championships in the winter sport of ski jumping are decided annually in the United States, starting in 1905.

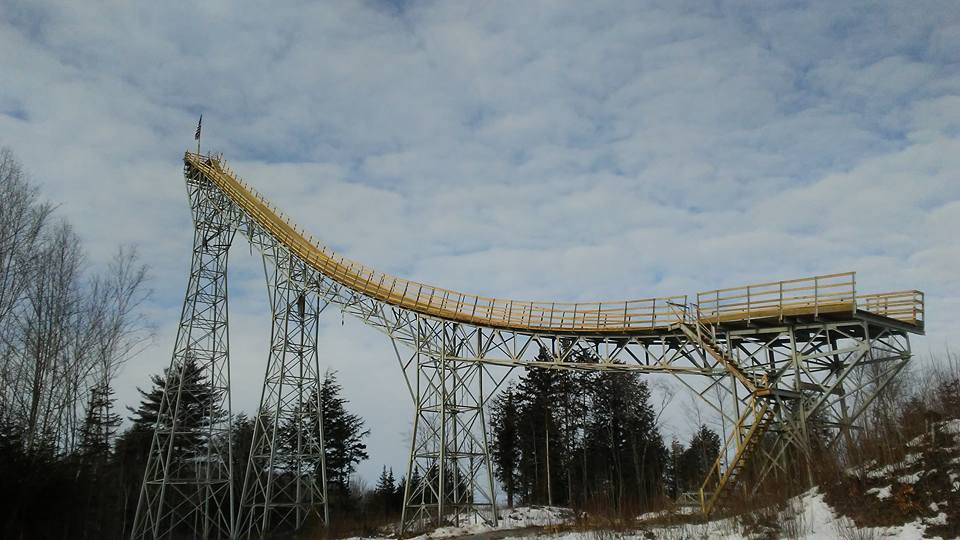
Nansen ski hill, NH

== Origins ==
Ski jumping national championships organized by the National Ski Association of America (NSA) were held annually from 1905 to 1962. Ski jumping, a winter sport competed on specially constructed ski hills, had been introduced by Norwegian immigrants to the U.S. in the 1880s, with ski clubs and annual tournaments beginning shortly afterwards. The National Ski Association, formed by five Midwestern clubs, established categories of participation, scoring rules, and scheduled sanctioned meets, including the National Championship Tournament.

== NSA National Championship Tournament ==
The National Championships were a stand-alone annual competition held during a two-day tournament (typically in February, not the end of the ski season). The tournaments were hosted at a member club jumping hill scheduled in advance. Points were awarded by three judges based on distance covered and proper form, combined over two jumps. Champion is the jumper who gets the most points per class, with a separate award for greatest standing distance. As an open competition through 1950, the entrants and tournament champion need not be a U.S. citizen. The National Ski Tournament featured Professional/Expert and Amateur/Novice class divisions, and may also include exhibition, Senior/veteran (over 31 years), and Junior (under 18 years) participation. Starting in 1948, the Class A (Expert) National Champion was awarded the Torger Tokle Memorial Trophy. No championships were held in 1919 and 1943–45, and in the years 1938, 1946 and 1952 separate open and closed competition national championships were awarded. Class B national championships were held 1908–1957. The 1904 Ishpeming annual tournament won by Conrad Thompson is cited by some sources as the first national championship, but this event was prior to official NSA tournaments.

NSA U.S. National Ski Jumping Champions
Year	Site	class A Champion	Sponsor	class B Champion	Sponsor	Notes
1905	Ishpeming, MI	Ole Westgaard	Coleraine, MN	n/a		
1906	Ishpeming, MI	Ole Feiring	Duluth, MN	n/a		
1907	Ashland, WI	Olaf Jonnum	Coleraine, MN	n/a		
1908	Duluth, MN	John Evenson	Duluth, MN	H. Trannum	Duluth, MN	
1909	Eau Claire, WI	John Evenson	Duluth, MN	Ingolf Sand	Minneapolis, MN	
1910	Coleraine, MN	Anders Haugen	Chippewa Falls, WI	Barney Riley	Coleraine, MN	
1911	Chippewa Falls, WI	Francis Kempe	Red Wing, MN	Barney Riley	Coleraine, MN	
1912	Fox River Grove, IL	Lars Haugen	Chippewa Falls, WI	Carl Solberg	St. Paul, MN	
1913	Ironwood, MI	Ragnar Omtvedt	Chicago, IL	John Jobe	Ironwood, MI	
1914	Virginia, MN	Ragnar Omtvedt	Chicago, IL	Sigurd Bergerson	Virginia, MN	
1915	Duluth, MN	Lars Haugen	Chippewa Falls, WI	Sigurd Bergerson	Duluth, MN	
1916	Glenwood, MN	Henry Hall	Steamboat Springs, CO	Andrew Olson	Iola, WI	
1917	St. Paul, MN	Ragnar Omtvedt	Chicago, IL	Ludvig Hoiby	Northfield, MN	
1918	Fox River Grove, IL	Lars Haugen	Chippewa Falls, WI	Sverre Hendricksen	Virginia, MN	
1919	cancelled	n/a		n/a		
1920	Chippewa Falls, WI	Anders Haugen	Steamboat Springs, CO	Sverre Hendricksen	Superior, WI	
1921	Genesee, CO	Carl Howelson	Steamboat Springs, CO	Einar Jensen	Chicago, IL	
1922	Fox River Grove, IL	Lars Haugen	Chippewa Falls, WI	Ragnar Omtvedt	Chicago, IL	
1923	Glenwood, MN	Anders Haugen	Orchard Lake, MN	Werner Forsberg	Ironwood, MI	
1924	Brattleboro, VT	Lars Haugen	Canton, SD	Tarald Hoidalen	Chicago, IL	
1925	Canton, SD	Alfred Ohrn	Chicago, IL	Halvor Bjorngaard	Red Wing, MN	
1926	Duluth, MN	Anders Haugen	Grand Beach, MI	Hans Troye	Madison WI	
1927	Genesee, CO	Lars Haugen	Minneapolis, MN	Hans Thorsdalen	Minneapolis, MN	
1928	Red Wing, MN	Lars Haugen	Minneapolis, MN	Steffan Trogstad	Superior, WI	
1929	Brattleboro, VT	Strand Mikkelsen	Greenfield, MA	Guttorm Paulsen	Chicago, IL	
1930	Canton, SD	Casper Oimoen	Minot, ND	John Steele	Denver, CO	
1931	Fox River Grove, IL	Casper Oimoen	Minot, ND	George Gunderson	Racine, WI	
1932	Lake Tahoe, CA	Anton Lekang	New York, NY	Hjalmar Hvam	Portland, OR	
1933	Salisbury, CT	Roy Mikkelsen	Chicago, IL	Olav Aasen	New York, NY	
1934	Fox River Grove, IL	Casper Oimoen	Minot, ND	James Hendricksen	Wisconsin Rapids, WI	
1935	Canton, SD	Roy Mikkelsen	Auburn, CA	Barney McLean	Hot Sulphur Springs, CO	
1936	Red Wing, MN	George Kotlarek	Duluth, MN	Eugene Wilson	Coleraine, MN	
1937	Salt Lake City, UT	Sigmund Ruud	Norway	Walter Johnson	Minneapolis, MN	
1938	Brattleboro, VT	Birger Ruud (open)	Norway	Ray Lambert	Lebanon, NH	
1938	Brattleboro, VT	Sig Ulland (closed)	Leavenworth, WA	Ray Lambert	Lebanon, NH	
1939	St. Paul, MN	Reidar Andersen	Norway	Len Soler	St. Paul, MN	
1940	Berlin, NH	Alf Engen	Sun Valley, ID	Ellsworth Mitchell	Ishpeming, MI	
1941	Snoqualmie Pass, WA	Torger Tokle	Brooklyn, NY	Robert Riley	Coleraine, MN	
1942	Duluth, MN	Ola Aanjesen	Norway	Max Rentsch	Minneapolis, MN	
1943	cancelled	n/a		n/a		
1944	cancelled	n/a		n/a		
1945	cancelled	n/a		n/a		
1946	Steamboat Springs, CO	Alf Engen (open)	Sun Valley, ID	W. Fahlstrom	Lake Placid, NY	
1946	Steamboat Springs, CO	Arthur Devlin (closed)	Lake Placid, NY	W. Fahlstrom	Lake Placid, NY	
1947	Ishpeming, MI	Arnholdt Kongsgård	Norway	Kenneth Oja	Ishpeming, MI	
1948	Snoqualmie Pass, WA	Arne Ulland	Norway	Neil Bergstrom	Iron Mountain, MI	
1949	Salt Lake City, UT	Petter Hugsted	Norway	Willis S. Olson	Eau Claire, WI	
1950	Duluth, MN	Olavi Kuronen	Finland	Dave Freeman	Iron Mountain, MI	
1951	Brattleboro, VT	Arthur E. Tokle	Chicago, IL	Keith Zuehlke	Eau Claire, WI	
1952	Salisbury, CT	Merrill Barber (open)	Brattleboro, VT	Earl Hill	Detroit, MI	
1952	Salisbury, CT	Clarence Hill (closed)	Ishpeming, MI	Earl Hill	Detroit, MI	
1953	Steamboat Springs, CO	Arthur E. Tokle	Chicago, IL	Richard Rahoi	Iron Mountain, MI	
1954	Ishpeming, MI	Roy Sherwood	Salisbury, CT	Raymond Gauthier	Ishpeming, MI	
1955	Leavenworth, WA	Rudy Maki	Ishpeming, MI	Jack Hooper	Iron Mountain, MI	
1956	Westby, WI	Keith Zuehlke	Eau Claire, WI	Jerry Lewis	Duluth, MN	
1957	Berlin, NH	Ansten Samuelstuen	Steamboat Springs, CO	William P. Erickson	Iron Mountain, MI	
1958	Iron Mountain, MI	Willis S. Olson	Eau Claire, WI	n/a		
1959	Leavenworth, WA	William P. Erickson	Iron Mountain, MI	n/a		
1960	Iron Mountain, MI	James Brennan	Leavenworth, WA	n/a		
1961	Brattleboro, VT	Ansten Samuelstuen	Steamboat Springs, CO	n/a		
1962	Fox River Grove, IL	Ansten Samuelstuen	Steamboat Springs, CO	n/a		

The National Ski Association was succeeded by the United States Ski Association (USSA) as the U.S. national governing body for skiing.

== USSA National Ski Jumping Champions ==
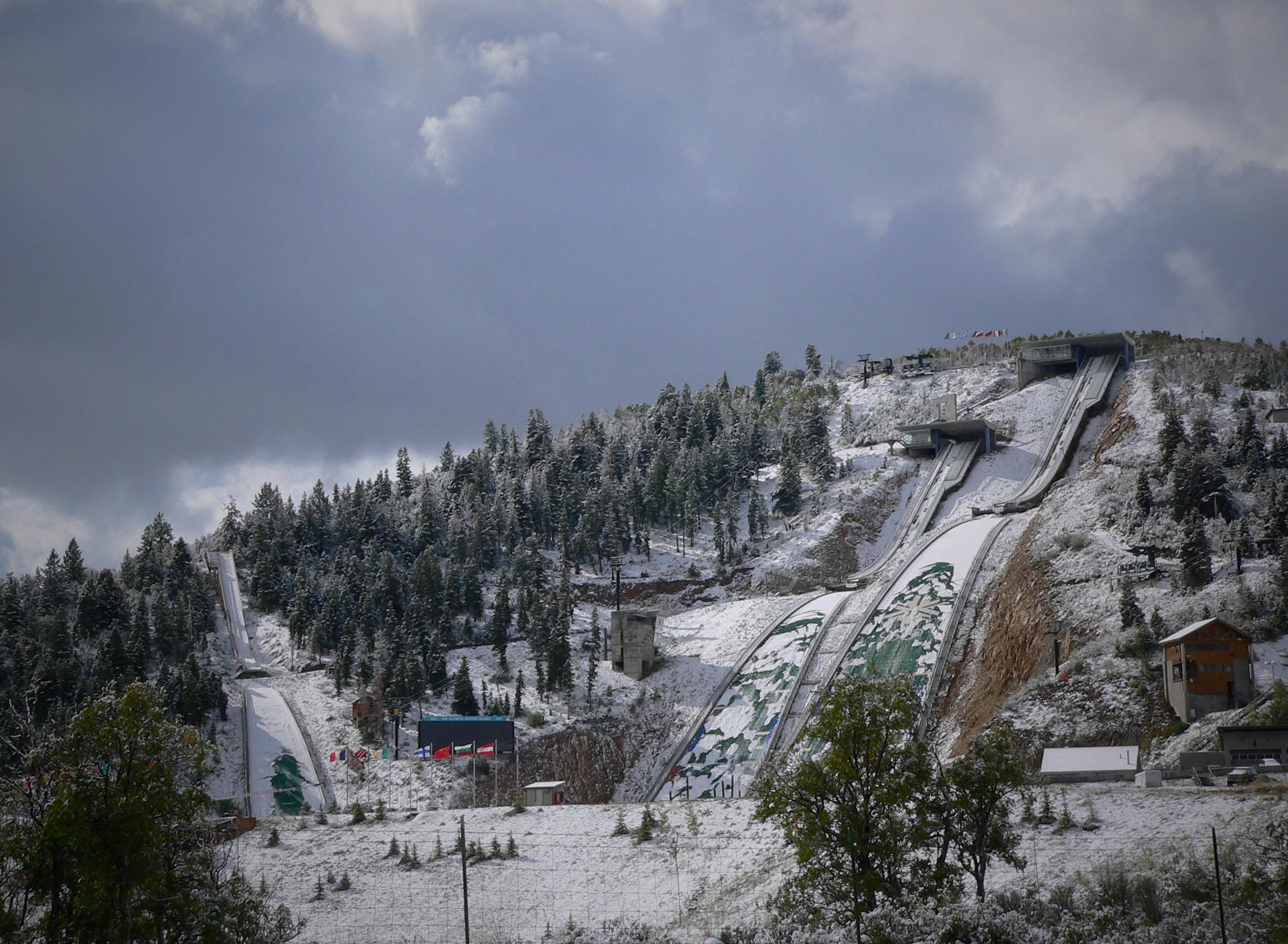
Utah Olympic Park jumps

Starting in 1981, ski jumping championships were competed on both Normal and Large Hills, with hill size measured in meters. In 1997 USSA was renamed the U.S. Ski and Snowboard Association (USSA). Women's national championship was added starting in 1997. Since 2010 the championships have been awarded by season (as does the FIS), which means that the championships held in October 2013 count as 2014 champions.

USSA National Ski Jumping Champions
Year	Site	Hill	Champion	Notes
1963	Steamboat Springs, CO	Howelsen Hill (K90)	Gene Kotlarek	
1964	Ishpeming, MI	Suicide Hill (K90)	John Balfanz	
1965	Berlin, NH	Big Nansen Ski Jump (K82)	David Hicks	
1966	Iron Mountain, MI	Pine Mountain Jump	Gene Kotlarek	
1967	Leavenworth, WA	Bakke Hill (K100)	Gene Kotlarek	
1968	Westby, WI	Snowflake Ski Jump (K100)	Jay Martin	
1969	Brattleboro, VT	Harris Hill (K88)	Adrian Watt	
1970	Eau Claire, WI	Silver Mine Hill (K85)	Bill Bakke	
1971	Durango, CO	(K70)	Jerry Martin	
1972	Berlin, NH	Big Nansen Ski Jump (K82)	Greg Swor	
1973	Ishpeming, MI	Suicide Hill (K90)	Jerry Martin	
1974	Leavenworth, WA	Bakke Hill (K100)	Ron Steele	
1975	Brattleboro, VT	Harris Hill (K88)	Jerry Martin	
1976	Olympic Valley, CA	Papoose Peak Jumps (K80)	Jim Denney	
1977	Gilford, NH	Torger Tokle Memorial Ski Jump (K87)	Jim Denney	
1978	Leavenworth, WA	Bakke Hill (K100)	Mike Devecka	
1979	Ishpeming, MI	Suicide Hill (K90)	Jeff Davis	
1980	Eau Claire, WI	Silver Mine Hill (K85)	Walter Malmquist	
1981	Steamboat Springs, CO	Howelsen Hill (K90, K114)	Horst Bulau	
1982	Lake Placid, NY	MacKenzie Intervale (K90)	Reed Zuehlke	
1982	Lake Placid, NY	MacKenzie Intervale (K120)	Jeff Hastings	
1983	Eau Claire, WI	Silver Mine Hill (K85)	Mark Konopacke	
1983	Westby, WI	Snowflake Ski Jump (K106)	Jeff Hastings	
1984	Steamboat Springs, CO	Howelsen Hill (K90, K114)	Jeff Hastings	
1985	Gilford, NH	Torger Tokle Memorial Ski Jump (K87)	Chris Hastings	
1986	Steamboat Springs, CO	Howelsen Hill (K90)	Rick Mewborn	
1986	Steamboat Springs, CO	Howelsen Hill (K114)	Mike Holland	
1987	Ishpeming, MI	Suicide Hill (K90)	Chris Hastings	
1987	Steamboat Springs, CO	Howelsen Hill (K114)	Mike Holland	
1988	Steamboat Springs, CO	Howelsen Hill (K90)	Mark Konopacke	
1988	Steamboat Springs, CO	Howelsen Hill (K114)	Mike Holland	
1989	Lake Placid, NY	MacKenzie Intervale (K90, K114)	Mike Holland	
1990	Eau Claire, WI	Silver Mine Hill (K85)	Jim Holland	
1990	Westby, WI	Snowflake Ski Jump (K106)	Jim Holland	
1991	Steamboat Springs, CO	Howelsen Hill (K90)	Jim Holland, Mark Konopacke	
1991	Steamboat Springs, CO	Howelsen Hill (K114)	Ryan Heckman	
1992	Brattleboro, VT	Harris Hill (K88)	Jim Holland	
1992	Lake Placid, NY	MacKenzie Intervale (K120)	Jim Holland	
1993	Westby, WI	Snowflake Ski Jump (K106)	Jim Holland	
1994	Steamboat Springs, CO	Howelsen Hill (K90)	Randy Weber	
1994	Steamboat Springs, CO	Howelsen Hill (K114)	Todd Lodwick	
1995	Park City, UT	Utah Olympic Park Jumps (K90)	Randy Weber	
1996	Lake Placid, NY	MacKenzie Intervale (K90, K120)	Randy Weber	
1997	Westby, WI	Snowflake Ski Jump (K106) Men	Casey Colby	
1997	Westby, WI	Snowflake Ski Jump (K106) Women	Karla Keck	
1998	Steamboat Springs, CO	Howelsen Hill (K90) Men	Randy Weber	
1998	Steamboat Springs, CO	Howelsen Hill (K114)	Todd Lodwick	
1998	Steamboat Springs, CO	Howelsen Hill (K90) Women	Lindsey Van	
1999	Lake Placid, NY	MacKenzie Intervale (K90) Men	Todd Lodwick	
1999	Lake Placid, NY	MacKenzie Intervale (K120) Men	Alan Alborn	
1999	Lake Placid, NY	MacKenzie Intervale (HS100) Women	Lindsey Van	
2000	Steamboat Springs, CO	Howelsen Hill (K90) Men	Brendan Doran	
2000	Steamboat Springs, CO	Howelsen Hill (K114) Men	Clint Jones	
2000	Steamboat Springs, CO	Howelsen Hill (K70, K114) Women	Lindsey Van	
2001	Park City, UT	Utah Olympic Park Jumps (K90) Men	Alan Alborn	
2001	Park City, UT	Utah Olympic Park Jumps (K120) Men	Bill Demong	
2001	Park City, UT	Utah Olympic Park Jumps (K90, K120) Women	Lindsey Van	
2002	Steamboat Springs, CO	Howelsen Hill (K90, K114) Men	Alan Alborn	
2002	Steamboat Springs, CO	Howelsen Hill (K70, K114) Women	Jessica Jerome	
2003	Steamboat Springs, CO	Howelsen Hill (K90) Men	Alan Alborn	
2003	Steamboat Springs, CO	Howelsen Hill (HS127) Men	Johnny Spillane	
2003	Steamboat Springs, CO	Howelsen Hill (K70) Women	Jessica Jerome	
2004	Steamboat Springs, CO	Howelsen Hill (HS100, HS127) Men	Todd Lodwick	
2004	Steamboat Springs, CO	Howelsen Hill (HS100, HS127) Women	Lindsey Van	
2005	Steamboat Springs, CO	Howelsen Hill (HS100, HS127) Men	Todd Lodwick	
2005	Steamboat Springs, CO	Howelsen Hill (HS127) Women	Lindsey Van	
2005	Steamboat Springs, CO	Howelsen Hill (HS100) Women	Jessica Jerome	
2006	Steamboat Springs, CO	Howelsen Hill (HS100) Men	Todd Lodwick	
2006	Steamboat Springs, CO	Howelsen Hill (HS127) Men	Clint Jones	
2006	Steamboat Springs, CO	Howelsen Hill (HS100, HS127) Women	Lindsey Van	
2007	Steamboat Springs, CO	Howelsen Hill (HS100, HS127) Men	Bill Demong	
2007	Steamboat Springs, CO	Howelsen Hill (HS100, HS127) Women	Lindsey Van	
2008	Park City, UT	Utah Olympic Park Jumps (HS100) Men	Johnny Spillane	
2008	Park City, UT	Utah Olympic Park Jumps (HS134) Men	Anders Johnson	
2008	Park City, UT	Utah Olympic Park Jumps (HS100, HS134) Women	Jessica Jerome	
2009	Park City, UT	Utah Olympic Park Jumps (HS100) Men	Anders Johnson	
2009	Park City, UT	Utah Olympic Park Jumps (HS134) Men	Nicholas Alexander	
2009	Lake Placid, NY	MacKenzie Intervale (HS100) Women	Lindsey Van	
2010	Park City, UT	Utah Olympic Park Jumps (HS100) Men	Nicholas Alexander	
2011	Park City, UT	Utah Olympic Park Jumps (HS100, HS134) Men	Peter Frenette	
2011	Fox River Grove, IL	Cary Hill (K70) Women	Sarah Hendrickson	
2012	Fox River Grove, IL	Cary Hill (K70) Men	Anders Johnson	
2012	Park City, UT	Utah Olympic Park Jumps (HS100) Men	Peter Frenette	
2012	Park City, UT	Utah Olympic Park Jumps (HS134) Women	Jessica Jerome	
2013	Park City, UT	Utah Olympic Park Jumps (HS100) Men	Nicholas Fairall	
2013	Park City, UT	Utah Olympic Park Jumps (HS134) Women	Sarah Hendrickson	
2014	Lake Placid, NY	MacKenzie Intervale (HS100) Men	Nicholas Alexander	
2014	Lake Placid, NY	MacKenzie Intervale (HS100) Women	Lindsey Van	
2015	Park City, UT	Utah Olympic Park Jumps (HS134) Men	William Rhoads	
2015	Park City, UT	Utah Olympic Park Jumps (HS134) Women	Nina Lussi	
2015	Lake Placid, NY	MacKenzie Intervale (HS100) Men	Michael Glasder	
2015	Lake Placid, NY	MacKenzie Intervale (HS100) Women	Nita Englund	
2016	Park City, UT	Utah Olympic Park Jumps (HS134) Men	William Rhoads	
2016	Park City, UT	Utah Olympic Park Jumps (HS134) Women	Jessica Jerome	
2016	Lake Placid, NY	MacKenzie Intervale (HS100) Men	William Rhoads	
2016	Lake Placid, NY	MacKenzie Intervale (HS100) Women	Tara Geraghty-Moats	
2017	Park City, UT	Utah Olympic Park Jumps (HS134) Men	William Rhoads	
2017	Park City, UT	Utah Olympic Park Jumps (HS134) Women	Nita Englund	
2017	Lake Placid, NY	MacKenzie Intervale (HS100) Men	Michael Glasder	
2017	Lake Placid, NY	MacKenzie Intervale (HS100) Women	Nina Lussi	

In 2017 USSA announced it was rebranding itself as U.S. Ski & Snowboard.

== U.S. Ski & Snowboard National Ski Jumping Champions ==
The 2020 National Championships were cancelled due to the global pandemic.

U.S. Ski & Snowboard National Ski Jumping Champions
Year	Site	Hill	Champion	Note
2018	Park City, UT	Utah Olympic Park Jumps (HS134, HS100) Men	Kevin Bickner	
2018	Park City, UT	Utah Olympic Park Jumps (HS134, HS100) Women	Nita Englund	
2019	Park City, UT	Utah Olympic Park Jumps (HS100) Men	Kevin Bickner	
2019	Park City, UT	Utah Olympic Park Jumps (HS100) Women	Nina Lussi	
2020	cancelled		n/a	
2021	Park City, UT	Utah Olympic Park Jumps (HS134, HS100) Men	Casey Larson	
2021	Park City, UT	Utah Olympic Park Jumps (HS134, HS100) Women	Annika Belshaw	
2022	Lake Placid, NY	MacKenzie Intervale (HS128, HS100) Men	Casey Larson	
2022	Lake Placid, NY	MacKenzie Intervale (HS128, HS100) Women	Annika Belshaw	
2023	Lake Placid, NY	MacKenzie Intervale (HS128, HS100) Men	Erik Belshaw	
2023	Lake Placid, NY	MacKenzie Intervale (HS128, HS100) Women	Annika Belshaw	
2024	Lake Placid, NY	MacKenzie Intervale (HS128, HS100) Men	Tate Frantz	
2024	Lake Placid, NY	MacKenzie Intervale (HS128, HS100) Women	Annika Belshaw	
2025	Lake Placid, NY	MacKenzie Intervale (HS128) Men	Jason Colby	
2025	Lake Placid, NY	MacKenzie Intervale (HS100) Men	Tate Frantz	
2025	Lake Placid, NY	MacKenzie Intervale (HS128) Women	Annika Belshaw	
2025	Lake Placid, NY	MacKenzie Intervale (HS100) Women	Alexa Brabec	

== See also ==
- U.S. Ski & Snowboard
- United States Nordic Combined Championships
- United States Alpine Ski Championships
- National Ski Hall of Fame
- Holmenkollen Ski Festival
