= Nils Stolzlechner =

American ski jumper

Personal information
- Nationality: USA/AUSTRIA
- Born: May 5, 1962 (age 64)

Sport
- Sport: Skiing

Nils Stolzlechner (born 5 May 1962) is an Austrian-born American former ski jumper.

Stolzlechner made his international debut at the FIS Nordic World Ski Championships 1982 in Oslo, where he reached #44 in the Individual normal hill competition and #54 in the Individual large hill competition. In the Team large hill competition he partnered with Jeff Hastings, Reed Zuehlke, and John Broman, and reached sixth place.

His strongest showing in the 1982/83 season in the FIS Ski Jumping World Cup was on 26 March 1983 in Planica, where he reached 12th place and scored World Cup points. In the next two seasons he competed successfully on the World Cup tour with consistent performances in the top 50 but did not score World Cup points awarded then only to the top 15 finishers. In 1985 he scored an eighth place on the normal hill on 8 January 1985, in Cortina d'Ampezzo. This was the highest individual placing of his career. At the end of the 1984-1985 season he had reached a joint 49th place. He was not selected for the 1984 Winter Olympics, though he was reportedly one of the top skiers in the US that season due to an injury that was not given time to heal.

In 1985 he was again a member of the US Nordic Ski Team. At the FIS Nordic World Ski Championships 1985 in Seefeld in Tirol he reached #25 on the normal hill, and with Mark Konopacke, Rick Mewborn, and Mike Holland reached #5 in the team event.

He participated in the Four Hills Tournament and World Cup in 1985-1986 successfully, placing consistently in the top 50 and ended his ski jumping career at the end of the 1986 season. Afterward he was a professional kitesurfer, and after retiring from competitive sports began a career in hotel management.
