= Lønnbergbakken =

Ski jumping hill in Raufoss, Norway

Coordinates: 60.7178°N 10.5864°E

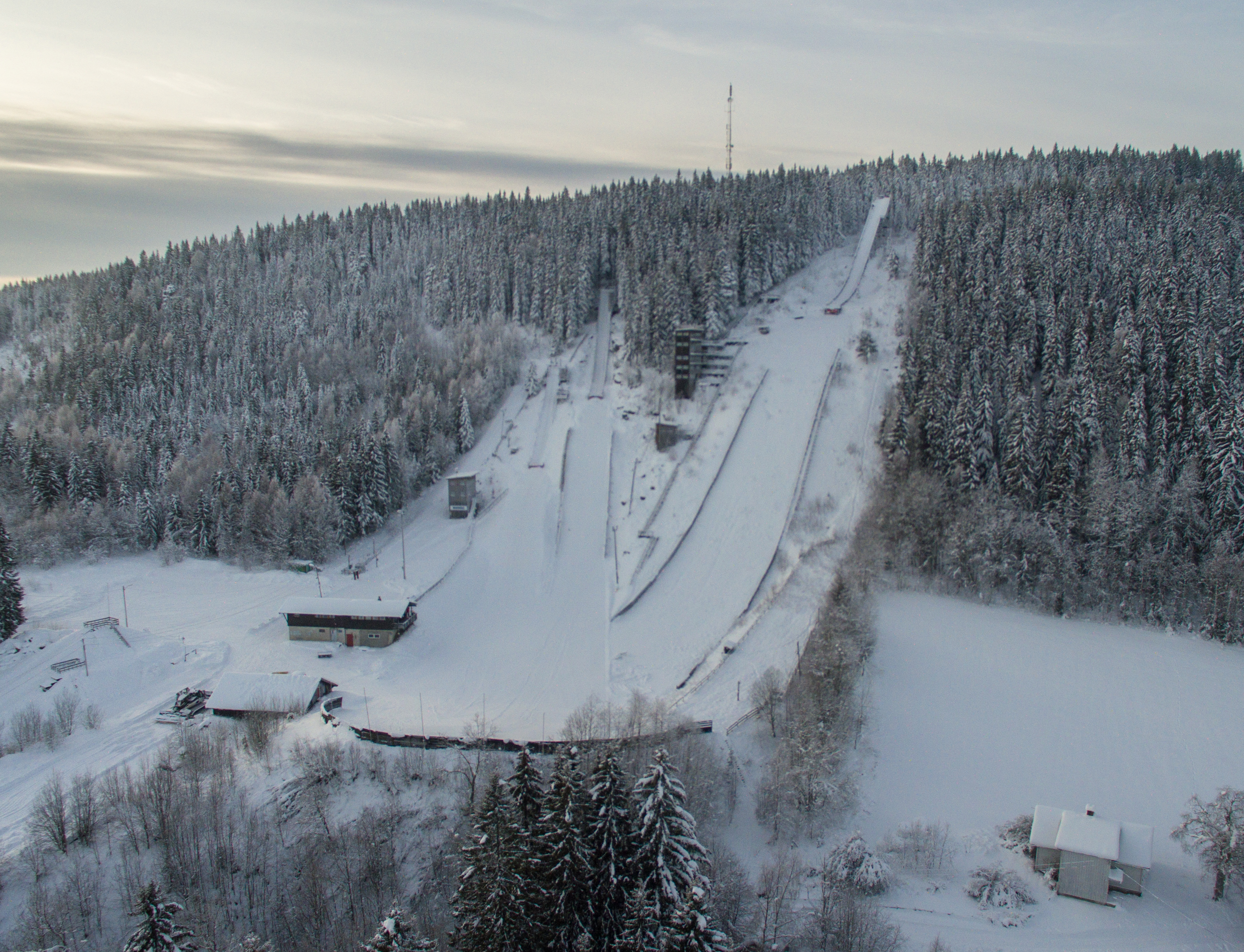
- Location: Raufoss; Norway
- Opened: 1921
- Renovated: 1927, 1939, 1959, 1982, 1987, 1990

Size
- K–point: K-90
- Hill size: HS 100
- Hill record: 104.5 m (348 ft) (Norway) Daniel André Tande (2012)

Lønnbergbakken are ski jumping hills in Raufoss, Norway.

== History ==
It was opened on 13 February 1921 and owned by Raufoss IL Hopp. It hosted one FIS Ski jumping World Cup event in 1990. Daniel André Tande holds the hill record.

== World Cup ==
=== Men ===
Date	Size	Winner	Second	Third
17 Mar 1990	K-90	(Austria) Andreas Felder	(Austria) Heinz Kuttin	(East Germany) Jens Weißflog
