= Winter sports in the United States =

Aspect of American Sport

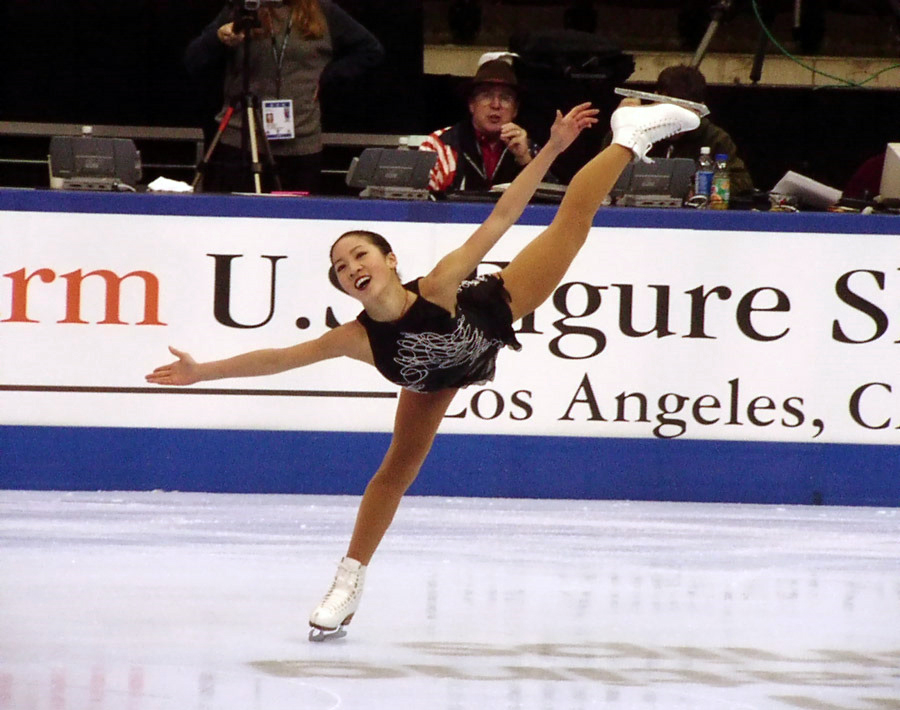
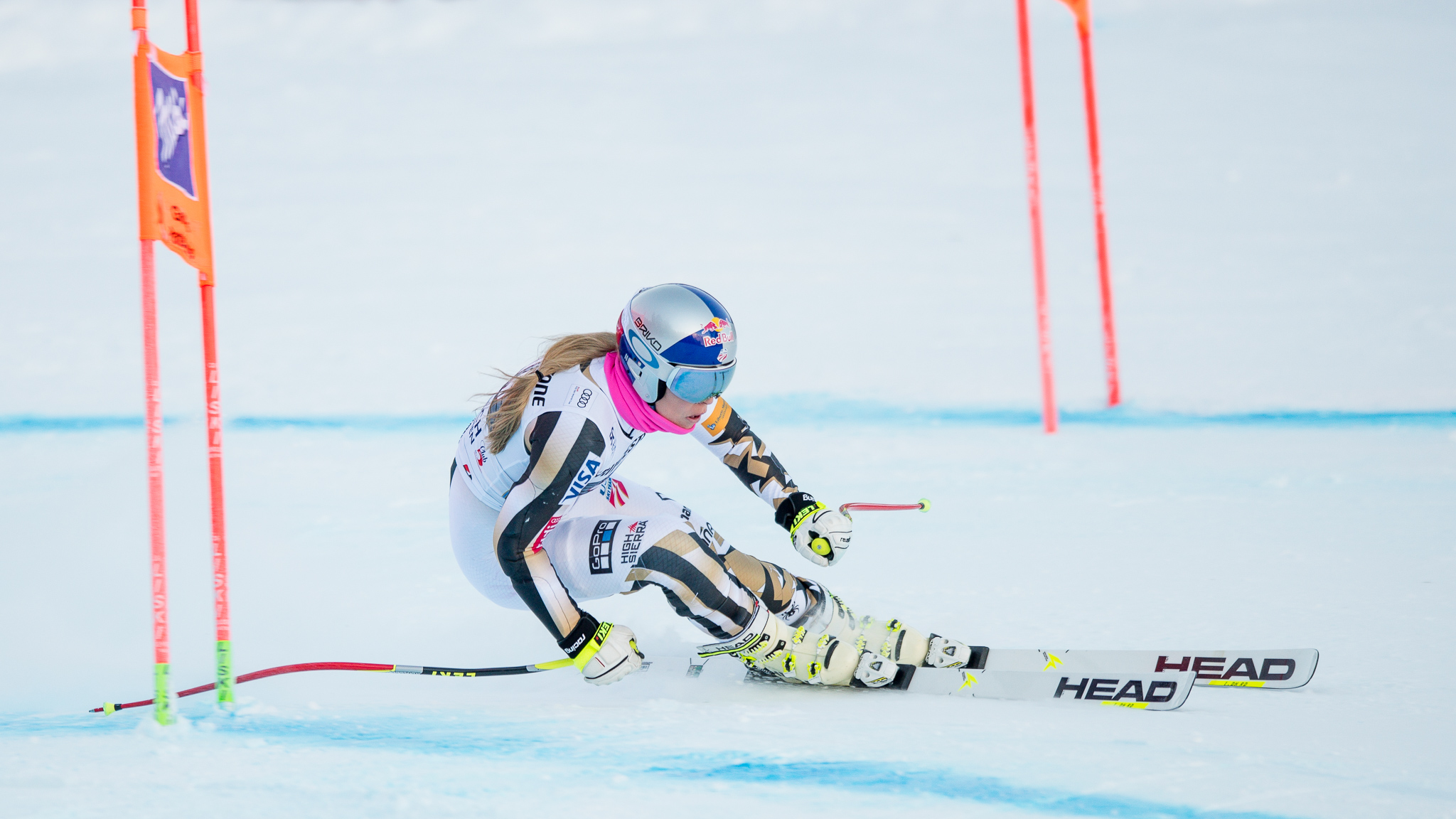
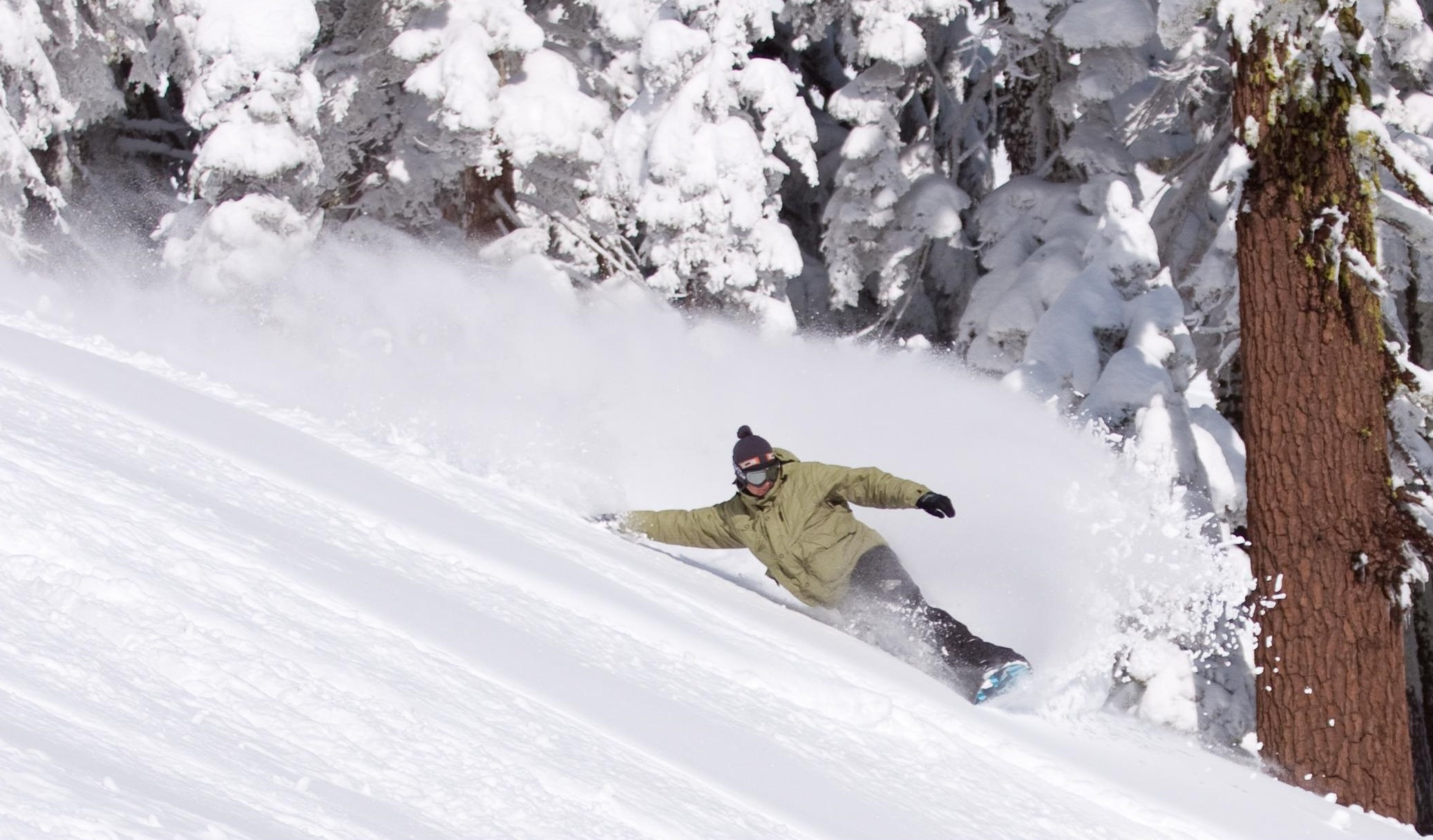
Popular winter sports in the United States include (from left to right, top to bottom) figure skating, ice hockey, skiing, and snowboarding

Winter sports in the United States are popular, both professionally and recreationally. Most sports activity on ice and snow takes place in the northern half of the country, but indoor facilities, simulators and artificial surfaces enable participation in all geographic areas.

The US has about 2000 ice rinks for skating sports. Ski touring, cross-country skiing, and snowshoeing opportunities exist wherever there is sufficient snow cover on public access land, such as National Forests, state parks, and municipal parks. The US has over 135,000 miles of snowmobile trails.

Compared to 2022, total winter sports participation grew by 22% in 2023. Snow sports generated over $20 billion for the US economy in 2016.

== Sports ==
=== Bandy ===
Introduced to the US in 1980, National championships have been held since 1981. United States men's national bandy team has taken part in the Bandy World Championships since 1985, with a 2025 fourth place finish as the best result. The United States Bandy Hall of Fame was established in 2014.

=== Biathlon ===
The US participated in the demonstration sport at the 1948 Winter Olympics, and established a national program at a Camp Hale training center in 1958. The US hosted Biathlon World Championships in 1973 and 1987, and 5 Biathlon World Cup events starting in 2004. More than a dozen clubs across 9 states participate in competition, with 1000 members.

=== Broomball ===
Broomball, as a game played on ice, has been in Minnesota since the 1930s. The first Minnesota broomball state championship was in 1966. Now with participants in around 10 states, National championships have been held since 1996.

=== Curling ===
First popular in "the upper midwest and small pockets of New England", curling is gradually making inroads in the rest of the country. The first curling club in the United States was established in 1830, then later the nationwide Grand National Curling Club (GNCC) founded in 1867. There are around 185 curling clubs across 33 states with 23,500 participants. The U.S. men's team won the gold medal at the 2018 Winter Olympics, and bronze at the 2006 Winter Olympics.

=== Ice climbing ===
Outdoor Industry Association (OIA) reports over 3 million participating in ice climbing across the US. In 2019, ice climbing gear purchases were more than $15 million.

Annual Ice Fests are held in Ouray, Colorado and Bozeman, Montana. Denver hosted an international World Championship in 2019.

=== Ice hockey ===
Twenty-four of the thirty-one professional National Hockey League teams are based in the United States, the other seven in Canada.

USA Hockey is the national ice hockey organization in the United States. In the 2022–23 season, USA Hockey had 556,186 registered hockey players.

=== Ice motorsports ===
An early motorcycle ice racing exhibition was held in Minnesota in the late 1950s. American Motorcyclist Association Ice Race National Championships have been held annually since 1981.

An American invention, indoor speedway ice racing was first held in 1975, and Speedway Indoor National Championships were awarded 1983–1999.

=== Ice skating ===
==== Figure skating ====
The governing body of figure skating competition in the United States is US Figure Skating. There are over 186,000 competitors as of 2020. Figure skating competition is a popular televised sport in the US.

==== Speed skating ====
The national governing body of speed skating competition is US Speedskating.

=== Iceboat sailing ===
In 1790 iceboats were introduced on New York's frozen Hudson River, with clubs forming by 1865. Important race series have included:

- 1881 Ice Yacht Challenge Pennant of America (established c. 1877)
- 1903 Stuart Cup
- 1904 Hearst International Challenge Cup
- 1940 Gar Wood Trophy (Skeeter class)
- 1953 IDNIYRA North American Ice Yacht Championship
- Nite National Championship.

=== Skiing ===
Skiing in the US is a multi-billion dollar industry of growing popularity, with over 11 million recreational snow sports participants in the winter of 2022–23. Annual reported totals of the skiing population vary somewhat with the quality and length of the ski season, which averages 106 days. Most popular are the regions of the Rocky Mountains, the Northeast and the Sierra Nevada/Cascade Mountains. The states of California, New York, Florida and Texas are home to the most skiers.

There are 486 alpine ski areas, around 1,000 cross-country ski areas and more than 25 ski jumping hills in the US. There are 7 states which offer backcountry snowcat and heli-ski opportunities. The largest resorts see more than 85% of skier visits. More than 85% of alpine ski areas use snowmaking to some extent. Between 2008 and 2013, US ski resorts experienced annual revenues of about $3 billion.

National organizations include U.S. Ski & Snowboard, USA Nordic Sport (USANS), United States Collegiate Ski and Snowboard Association, National Ski Council Federation, Women's Ski Jumping USA, NASTAR, National Ski Patrol, Professional Ski Instructors of America, Snowsports Industries America (SIA), National Ski Areas Association (NSAA), Cross Country Ski Areas Association and National Ski & Snowboard Retailers Association.

=== Sledding ===
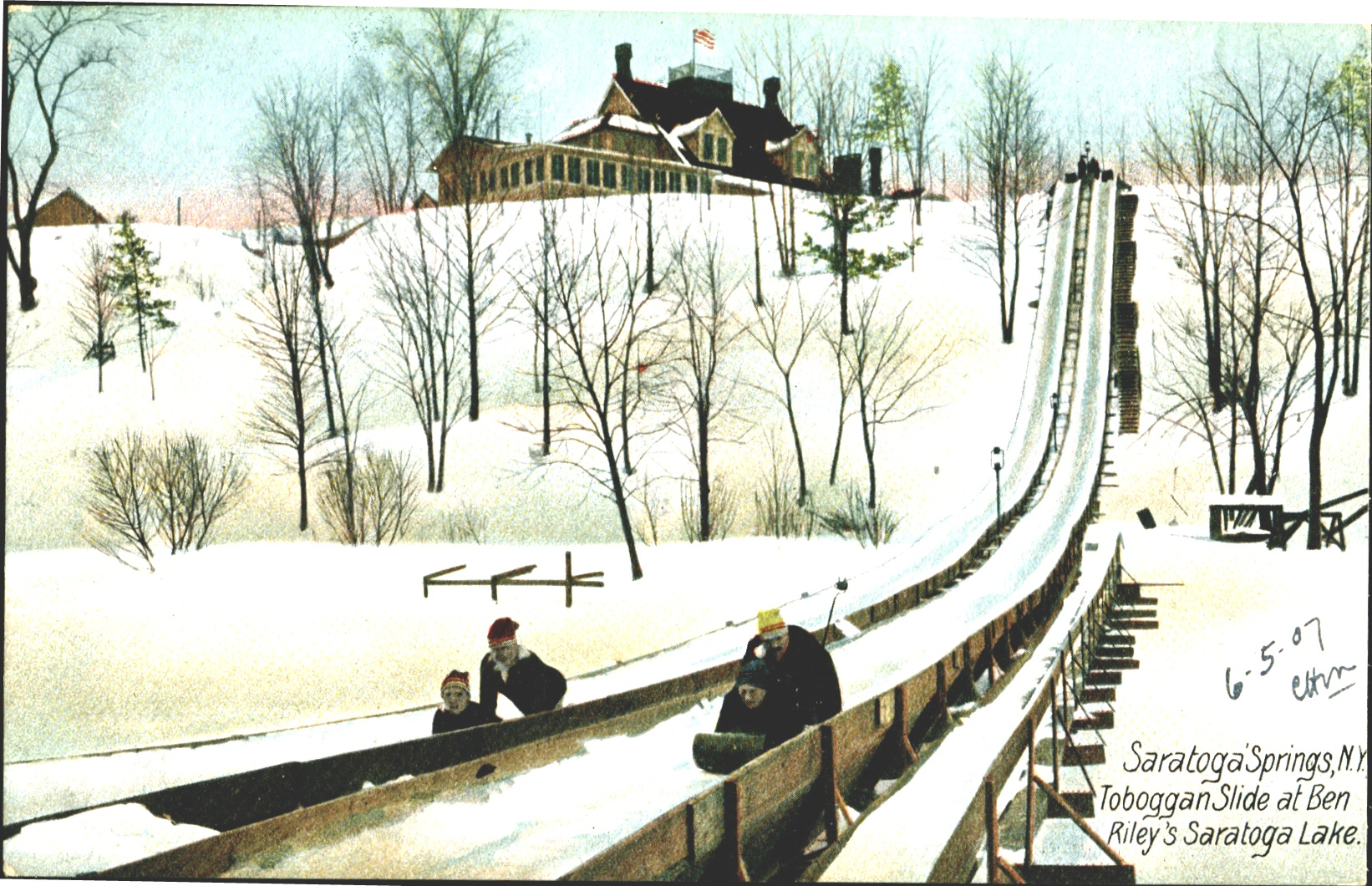
New York Saratoga Springs Toboggan Run, 1907

Recreational use of toboggans and sleds in coasting downhill is a traditional form of juvenile snow play. Advancements in the 1880s include constructed snow slides as part of winter festival attractions (starting with Saratoga Springs), and the Flexible Flyer sled with steerable runners. Snow tubing and mountain coasters are more recent variants.

==== Bobsled ====
Throughout the Nineteenth century in the US, bobsledding referred to a horse-drawn conveyance with two pairs of runners. In 1929 the Lake Placid Club built a bobsled course, followed by the Mt. Van Hoevenberg Olympic course which opened in 1930. World championships were held at Lake Placid in 1949, 1961, 1969, 1973, 1978, 1983, and 2003. American innovations have included the flexible four-man bobsled in 1935, and the all-steel, four-man bobsled in 1946. The Utah Olympic Park Track opened in 1997 for use in the 2002 Salt Lake Winter Olympics. Bobsleigh at the Winter Olympics has resulted in US medals in 1928, 1932, 1936, 1948, 1952, 1956, 2002, 2006, and 2010. USA Bobsled is the governing body for bobsledding in the United States.

Kaillie Humphries is one the most successful bobsledders for the United States.

==== Luge ====
The national governing body for luge is USA Luge. US has 30 World Cup wins since 1994. Lake Placid, New York hosted the World Luge Congress in 2016 and 2024. Luge facilities are in Lake Placid, Park City, Utah, Muskegon, Michigan, and Negaunee, Michigan.

==== Sled dog racing ====
Iditarod Trail Sled Dog Race is an annual long-distance sled dog race run in early March from Anchorage to Nome, entirely in the state of Alaska.

Marquette, Michigan plans an annual Dog Sled Race, depending on snow conditions. The UP 200 held in Michigan's Upper Peninsula is another sled dog race. The trial covers over 240 miles of challenging terrain through the areas of Marquette, Grand Marais, Wetmore, and Pictured Rocks National Lakeshore and finishes at Mattson Lower Harbor Park in Marquette. The UP 200 is one of America's premier 12-dog, mid-distance sled dog races, qualifying teams for the Iditarod.

=== Snowboarding ===
Snowboarding originated in America, and after rapid growth in the 1980s and 1990s has stabilized at over 7.5 million participants in the US.

=== Snowmobiling ===
Recreational snowmobiling in the US began in the 1950s and by 2010 had from 3–4 million participants. The International 500 Snowmobile Race (since 1969), World Championship Snowmobile Derby (since 1964) and World Championship Snowmobile Hill Climb competitions are held annually. World Championship Snowmobile Hill Climb competition is held in Jackson, Wyoming at the Snow King Mountain resort each year in March. Alaska's "Iron Dog" at 2,031 miles (3,269 km) long is the longest snowmachine race in the world.

Snowmobile trails can be found in 27 states. National organizations are the American Council of Snowmobile Associations (ACSA), United Snowmobile Alliance and there is a regional Rocky Mountain Snowmobile Hillclimbing Association.

=== Snowshoeing ===
Snowshoeing may be the oldest winter sport in the Americas, arriving with the first people over the Bering land bridge. The United States Snowshoe Association (USSSA) was founded in 1977 to serve as a governing body for competitive snowshoeing. Since 2001 they have held annual National Championships in February. Since 2019, participation in snowshoeing is up 12%.

== Multi-sport events ==
=== Arctic Winter Games ===
Alaska has participated in every Arctic Winter Games, and has hosted the event 7 times starting in 1974.

=== Winter Dew Tour ===
In 2008 the Action Sports Tour (AST) first annual Winter Dew Tour included halfpipe and slopestyle competitions. In 2019, the Winter Dew Tour moved to its new home at Woodward Mountain Park at Copper Mountain, Colorado. Events include slopestyle, superpipe, team halfpipe, snowboard streetstyle, and adaptive banked slalom.

=== Winter X Games ===
Winter X Games are held in Aspen, Colorado every winter, starting in 2002. The first Winter X Games took place in 1997 at Snow Summit ski resort in Big Bear Lake, California. The X Games were next held at Crested Butte Mountain Resort in Colorado for two years. Mount Snow, Vermont hosted the X Games in 2000 and 2001.

=== Winter World University Games ===
The US has participated in the Winter Universiade since 1966, and hosted the 1972 and 2023 Winter FISU World University Games.

=== Winter Olympics ===
The United States is a traditional powerhouse in the Winter Olympics. However, the 2018 Winter Olympics saw the country's worst performance in terms of medals in 20 years. Over the past 6 Winter Olympic Games the US has consistently earned at least 9 gold medals.

== Participation ==
In 2022, winter sports had over 30 million US participants. Outdoor Foundation reports that 8 million people participated in cross-country skiing, snowshoeing, or telemark skiing in the 2012–2013 winter season.

Winter sports are underrepresented by ethnic minorities due to the fact that such sports are expensive to play. In an effort to broaden participation, the Share Winter Foundation and its partners aim to share winter with 100,000 youth by 2028. Other inclusion-focused programs include SOS Outreach, and Discover Winter in Utah.

== Other notable events ==
- Winter festivals such as the Saint Paul Winter Carnival and Dartmouth Winter Carnival include sports events
