= Henry Hall (skier) =

American ski jumper

Henry Christian Hall
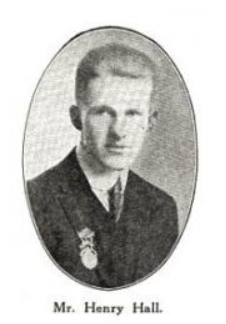

Personal information
- Born: February 27, 1893 Ishpeming, Michigan, US
- Died: 17 April 1986 (aged 93) Loveland, Colorado, US
- Resting place: Loveland Burial Park

Sport
- Sport: Ski jumping
- Club: Ishpeming Ski Club, Steamboat Springs Winter Sports Club, Denver Rocky Mountain Ski Club, Detroit Ski Club

Henry Christian Hall (February 27, 1893 – April 17, 1986) was the first person born in America to win an international ski jumping meet, and the first person internationally to jump over 200 feet. He twice set the world record for ski jumping.

== Ski Jumping Highlights ==
Born in Ishpeming, Michigan of Norwegian immigrant parents, he learned ski jumping along with all of his five brothers. Hall became a strict vegetarian under the guidance of his friend Anders Haugen.

Hall won the farthest distance ski jump award at the annual U.S. national championship tournament in 1914 (along with his brother Carl), 1915, and 1924.

In 1916 Hall won the national ski jumping championship, and in 1915, 1917 and 1920 was second place. At the 1917 Steamboat Springs Ski Festival, he achieved a leap of 203 feet, which was ten feet better than the previous world record held by Ragnar Omtvedt. In 1921, Henry Hall again achieved the world record with a jump of 229 feet on the Nels Nelsen Hill in Canada. In 1925 Hall won the annual Norge Ski Club tournament.

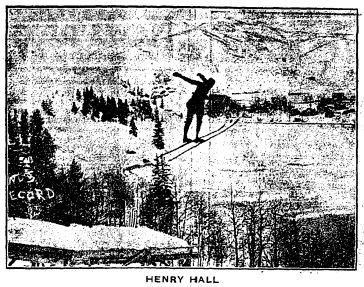
Henry Hall in 1920

== Club and hill development ==
Hall helped to establish Colorado's Hot Sulphur Springs Winter Sports Club in 1910. With his brothers he started the Detroit Ski Club. Hall built ski jumps in 1923 at Northville, Michigan, in 1926 at Rochester, Michigan, and in 1936 at Brighton, Michigan.

== Legacy ==
In 1967, he was inducted into the US National Ski Hall of Fame. The "Henry Hall Cup" is an award for a promising young ski jumper at the Steamboat Springs Winter Sports Club. In 2001 he was inducted into Norway's Sverresborg Trøndelag Folkemuseum, and into the Colorado Ski and Snowboard Hall of Fame in 2006.

=== Ski jumping world records ===
Date	Hill	Location	Metres	Feet
March 2, 1917	Howelsen Hill	Steamboat Springs, United States	61.9	203
February 9, 1921	Nels Nelsen Hill	Revelstoke, Canada	69.8	229

== See also ==
- Karl Hovelsen
- Alf Engen
