= Bachtelblick-Schanze =

Ski jumping spot

Coordinates: 47°18′44″N 8°55′08″E

- Gibswil ski jumping hills
- Location: Gibswil; Switzerland
- Operator: NT SC Hinwil / SC Am Bachtel
- Opened: 2006

Size
- K–point: 60 m
- Hill size: 67 m
- Hill record: 65,5 m (Adrian Schuler)

The Bachtelblick-Schanze is a ski jumping hill in the town of Gibswil, close to Fischenthal, Switzerland. It was built in 2005-06 and was opened in late 2006. In the summer it is covered with plastic matting. Close to this hill there is also a K28 and K14. The hill record, 65.5 m was set by Adrian Schuler, jumping for SC Einsiedeln.
