= Snowflake Ski Jump =

Ski jumping hill in Wisconsin, United States

Coordinates: 43.6948°N 90.8619°W

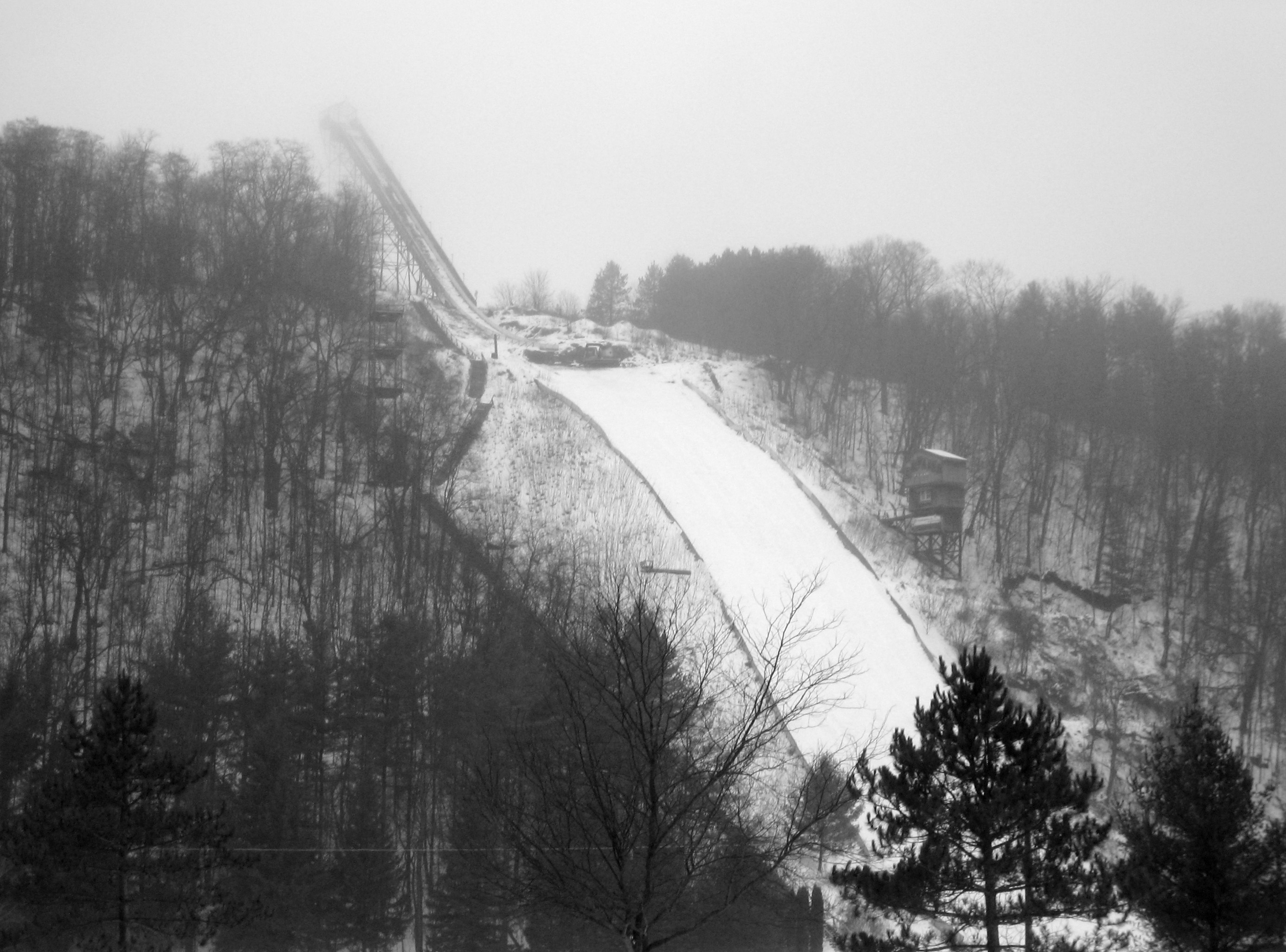
- Location: Timber Coulee; Westby, Wisconsin; United States
- Opened: 1961
- Renovated: 1999

Size
- K–point: 106 m
- Hill size: 118 m
- Hill record: Fredrik Bjerkeengen; 130.0 m

The Snowflake Ski Jump is a ski jumping hill north of Westby, Wisconsin, United States, in Timber Coulee. It is host to a ski jumping tournament that has taken place annually since 1961. The hill, the seventh-largest in North America, is categorized as a large hill, which means it has a K-spot of 106 meters. The official record of 130.0 meters was achieved by Fredrik Bjerkeengen of Norway on February 10, 2008.

== Competitions ==
Snowflake has hosted numerous FIS Ski Jumping Continental Cup and United States Ski and Snowboard Association tournaments. After hosting SuperTour events in 2009 and 2010, the ski jumping hill hosted the fourth competition of the newly formed five-hill US Cup in February 2011.

In addition to U.S. and international events, Snowflake is also host to annual junior ski jumping events on the smaller hills adjacent to the large hill. The five smaller hills have K-spots of 6,10, 20, 40, and 65 meters.

== Snowflake Ski and Golf Club ==
Formed in 1922 as the Westby Ski Club, the all-volunteer club held the first ski jumping tournament southeast of Westby, near Bloomingdale, Wisconsin in 1923. Following several successful tournaments, the club was renamed the Snowflake Ski Club in 1925. After hosting tournaments on three different hills, the larger and more modern jump, which is used today, was constructed in 1960. The first tournament held on the current hill was in late January 1961.

A nine-hole golf course was built to aid in funding the annual ski jumping tournament. It is billed as "The Only Ski Jump in the World with a 9-hole Golf Course at Its Base".
