= List of ski jumping hills =

This is a list of ski jumping hills passing the International Ski and Snowboard Federation (FIS) rules, to be competition hills in FIS Ski Jumping World Cup, Continental Cup, and FIS Cup. If a venue consists of multiple ski jumping hills, only the homologated hill sizes are listed.

Over the course of history, the existence of over eight thousand ski jumping hills in 48 countries was documented. As of April 2025, around 1600 of them are in operation. However, only 147 ski jumping hills at 95 venues in 87 localities are homologated for international competitions.

== Austria ==
| Rank | Hill | Hill Size | Town / City | Year Opened | Year last used | Image |
|---|---|---|---|---|---|---|
| 1 | Kulm | 235 | Tauplitz/Bad Mitterndorf | 1950 | 2025 | |
| 2 | Paul-Ausserleitner-Schanze | 142 | Bischofshofen | 1947 | 2026 | |
| 3 | Bergisel Ski Jump | 128 | Innsbruck | 1930 | 2026 | |
| 4 | Brunnentalschanze | 115 | Stams | 1988 | 2025 | |
| 5 | Toni-Seelos-Olympiaschanze | 109 | Seefeld in Tirol | 1931 | 2025 | |
| 6 | Erzbergschanzen | 109 | Eisenerz | 1931 | 2025 | |
| 7 | Montafoner Schanzenzentrum | 108 | Tschagguns | 2007 | 2015 | |
| 8 | W90-Mattensprunganlage | 98 | Ramsau am Dachstein | 1995 | 2021 | |
| 9 | Villacher Alpenarena | 98 | Ramsau am Dachstein | 1937 | 2026 | |
| 10 | Felix Gottwald Ski Jumping Stadium | 90 | Saalfelden | 1970 | 2026 | |
| 11 | Aigner-Schanze | 90 | Hinzenbach | 2010 | 2025 | |
| 12 | Paul-Ausserleitner-Schanze | 78 | Bischofshofen | 1947 | 2010 | |
| 13 | Toni-Seelos-Olympiaschanze | 75 | Seefeld in Tirol | 2010 | 2015 | |
| 14 | Erzbergschanzen | 70 | Eisenerz | 1997 | – | |
| 15 | Villacher Alpenarena | 68 | Villach | 1937 | – | |
| 16 | Brunnentalschanze | 68 | Stams | 1990 | – | |
| 17 | Montafoner Schanzenzentrum | 66 | Tschagguns | 2014 | 2026 | |
| 18 | Schattbergschanze | 42 | Kitzbühel | 1904 | – | |

== Canada ==
| Rank | Hill | Hill Size | Town / City | Year Opened | Year last used | Image |
|---|---|---|---|---|---|---|
| 1 | Whistler Olympic Park | 142 | Whistler, British Columbia | 2008 | 2010 | |
| 2 | Whistler Olympic Park | 104 | Whistler, British Columbia | 2008 | 2023 | |

== China ==
| Rank | Hill | Hill Size | Town / City | Year Opened | Year last used | Image |
|---|---|---|---|---|---|---|
| 1 | Snow Ruyi National Ski Jumping Centre | 140 | Zhangjiakou | 2021 | 2026 | |
| 2 | Snow Ruyi National Ski Jumping Centre | 106 | Zhangjiakou | 2021 | 2024 | |

== Czech Republic ==
- Areál velkých můstků Čerťák, Harrachov (World Cup) – HS 210, HS 142
- Ještěd ski jumping hills, Liberec (2009 World Championships, World Cup) – HS 136, HS 100
- Areal Horečky, Frenstat – HS 106
- Sportovní areál Čerťák, Harrachov – HS 100, HS 73

== Estonia ==
| Rank | Hill | Hill Size | Town / City | Year Opened | Year last used | Image |
|---|---|---|---|---|---|---|
| 1 | Tehvandi Sports Center | 97 | Otepää | 1968 | 2024 | |

== Finland ==
- Rukatunturi ski jumping hill, Ruka, Kuusamo (World Cup) – HS 142
- Salpausselkä, Lahti (1926, 1938, 1958, 1978, 1989, 2001, and 2017 World Championships, World Cup) – HS 130, HS 100
- Puijo ski jumping hill, Kuopio (World Cup) – HS 130, HS 100
- Ounasvaara ski jumping hills, Rovaniemi (1984 World Championships) – HS 97

== France ==
- Tremplin du Praz, Courchevel (1992 Winter Olympics, Summer Grand Prix) – HS 132, HS 96
- Côte Feuillée stadium, Chaux-Neuve (Continental Cup) – HS 118, HS 64
- Stade Nordique des Tuffes, Prémanon – HS 90
- Des Bas Rupts, Gerardmer – HS 72
- Tremplin du Claret, Autrans (1968 Winter Olympics) – HS 64

== Germany ==
- Heini-Klopfer-Skiflugschanze, Oberstdorf (World Cup) – HS 235
- Mühlenkopfschanze, Willingen (World Cup) – HS 147
- Große Olympiaschanze, Garmisch-Partenkirchen (1936 Winter Olympics, World Cup and Four Hills) – HS 142, HS 89, HS 47
- Hochfirst Ski Jump, Titisee-Neustadt (World Cup) – HS 142
- Kanzlersgrund, Oberhof (World Cup Nordic Combined) – HS 140, HS 100
- Vogtland Arena, Klingenthal (World Cup) – HS 140
- ORLEN Arena Oberstdorf, Oberstdorf (1987, 2005, and 2021 World Championships, World Cup and Four Hills) (normal, large and ski flying hills) – HS 137, HS 106, HS 60
- Große Zirmbergschanze, Ruhpolding (World Cup Nordic Combined) – HS 128, HS 100
- Inselbergschanze, Brotterode (Continental Cup, Fis-Cup) – HS 117
- Adler Ski Stadium, Hinterzarten (Summer Grand Prix) – HS 109, HS 77
- Fichtelbergschanzen, Oberwiesenthal (Continental Cup, Fis-Cup) – HS 105, HS 69
- Marktiegelschanze, Lauscha (Continental Cup) – HS 102
- Langenwaldschanze, Schonach (Continental Cup) – HS 100
- Kälbersteinschanzen, Berchtesgaden (Fis Cup) – HS 98
- Große Ruhesteinschanze, Baiersbronn – HS 90
- St.-Georg-Schanze, Winterberg – HS 87
- Vogtlandschanzen, Klingenthal – HS 85
- Degenfeld-Schanzen, Degenfeld – HS 83
- Baptist-Kitzlinger-Schanze, Breitenberg – HS 78
- Ochsenkopfschanzen, Bischofsgrün – HS 71
- Ski jumping facility at Wadeberg, Oberhof (1931 World Championships) – HS 70
- Pöhlbachschanze, Pöhla – HS 66

== Italy ==
| Rank | Hill | Hill Size | Town / City | Year Opened | Year last used | Image |
|---|---|---|---|---|---|---|
| 1 | "Giuseppe Dal Ben" Ski Jumping Arena | 135 | Predazzo | 1988 | 2026 | |
| 2 | "Giuseppe Dal Ben" Ski Jumping Arena | 106 | Predazzo | 1988 | 2026 | |
| 3 | "Giuseppe Dal Ben" Ski Jumping Arena | 66 | Predazzo | 1988 | 2021 | |

== Japan ==
- Hakuba Ski Jumping Stadium, Hakuba, Nagano (1998 Winter Olympics) – HS 134, HS 98
- Okurayama Ski Jump Stadium, Sapporo (1972 Winter Olympics, 2007 World Championships, World Cup) – HS 137
- Miyanomori Ski Jump Stadium, Sapporo (1972 Winter Olympics, 2007 World Championships) – HS 100
- Zaō Jump Stadium, Mount Zaō, Yamagata – HS 102

== Kazakhstan ==
- Burabay Ski Jumps, Shchuchinsk – HS 140, HS 99
- Sunkar International Ski Jumping Complex, Almaty (World Cup, Continental Cup) – HS 138, HS 100, HS 64

== Norway ==
- Vikersundbakken, Vikersund (World Cup, Continental Cup and FIS Cup) – HS 240, HS 117
- Lysgårdsbakken, Lillehammer (1994 Winter Olympics, World Cup) – HS 140, HS 98
- Renabakkene, Rena (Local Cup) – HS 139, HS 109
- Granåsen, Trondheim (1997 and 2025 World Championships) – HS 138, HS 102
- Holmenkollbakken, Oslo (1952 Winter Olympics, 1930, 1966, 1982, and 2011 World Championships, World Cup) – HS 134
- Midtstubakken, Oslo (1966, 1982, and 2011 World Championships) – HS 106
- Tveitanbakken, Notodden (Fis-Cup) – HS 98
- Huka hoppanlegg, Høydalsmo – HS 94

== Poland ==
- Wielka Krokiew, Zakopane (1929, 1939, and 1962 World Championships, World Cup) – HS 140
- Malinka, Wisła (World Cup) – HS 134
- Średnia Krokiew, Zakopane (1962 World Championships) – HS 105, HS 70
- Skalite, Szczyrk HS 104, HS 75
- Orlinek, Karpacz – HS 94

== Romania ==
- Râșnov Ski Jump, Râșnov (2013 European Youth Olympic Winter Festival, Ladies world cup) – HS 97, HS 71, HS 38

== Russia ==
- RusSki Gorki Jumping Center, Estosadok, Krasnaya Polyana, Sochi, Krasnodar Krai (2014 Winter Olympics) – HS 140, HS 106
- Snezhinka, Tchaikowski (Continental Cup, Ladies world cup) – HS 140, HS 102, HS 72
- Tramplin Stork, Nizhny Tagil (World Cup, Continental Cup) – HS 134, HS 97

== Slovakia ==
- MS 1970, Štrbské Pleso (1970 World Championships) – HS 100

== Slovenia ==
- Letalnica bratov Gorišek, Planica (World Cup) – HS 240
- Planica Nordic Centre, Planica (2023 World Championships, World Cup) – HS 138, HS 102, HS 80, HS 61
- Bauhenk, Kranj (Continental Cup) – HS 109
- Savina Ski Jumping Center, Ljubno ob Savinji (World Cup) – HS 94
- Grajski grič, Velenje – HS 75
- Nordijski Center Račeva, Žiri – HS 65

== South Korea ==
- Alpensia Ski Jumping Stadium, Pyeongchang (2018 Winter Olympics, World Cup) – HS 142, HS 109, HS 66

== Sweden ==
- Lugnet Hills, Falun (1974, 1993, and 2015 World Championships, Continental Cup, World cup) – HS 134, HS 100
- Paradiskullen, Örnsköldsvik (SM) – HS 100

== Switzerland ==
- Gross-Titlis-Schanze, Engelberg (1984 World Championships, World Cup) – HS 140
- Schanzen Einsiedeln, Einsiedeln (Continental Cup) – HS 117, HS 77
- Nationales Nordisches Skizentrum, Kandersteg – HS 106, HS 74
- Bachtelblick-Schanze, Gibswil – HS 66

== Turkey ==
- Kiremitliktepe Ski Jump, Erzurum (2011 Universiade, Continental cup) – HS 142, HS 109

== United States ==
- Utah Olympic Park, Park City, Utah (2002 Winter Olympics, World Cup) – HS 134, HS 100
- Pine Mountain Jump, Iron Mountain, Michigan (Continental Cup, World Cup) – HS 133
- Lake Placid Olympic Ski Jumping Complex, Lake Placid, New York (1932 and 1980 Winter Olympics, 1950 World Championships, Continental Cup, World Cup) – HS 128, HS 100
- Harris Hill Ski Jump, Brattleboro, Vermont – HS 98
- Silver Mine Hill, Eau Claire, Wisconsin – HS 95
- Howelsen Hill, Steamboat Springs, Colorado (Continental Cup) – HS 75

== Other notable venues ==
The following venues do not hold a valid FIS certificate, and either host only local competitions, or are disused or demolished:

- Igman Olympic Jumps, mountain of Igman in Ilidža, Bosnia and Herzegovina (1984 Winter Olympics, Sarajevo)
- Big Thunder Ski Jumping Center (closed - 1996), Thunder Bay, Ontario, Canada (1995 World Championships, World Cup) – K-120, K-90, K-64, K-37, K-20, K-10
- Canada Olympic Park (closed 2019), Calgary, Alberta, Canada (1988 Winter Olympics), K-114 (not operational), K-89, K-63, K-38, K-18, K-10
- Rübezahl ski jump, Janské Lázně, Czech Republic (1925 World Championships)
- Tremplin Olympique du Mont, Chamonix, France (1924 Winter Olympics, 1937 World Championships)
- Dauphine, Saint-Nizier-du-Moucherotte, France (1968 Winter Olympics)
- Trampolino Olimpico, Cortina d'Ampezzo, Italy (1956 Winter Olympics, 1927 World Championships) – 92 | 85
- Trampolino Gigante Corno d'Aola, Ponte di Legno, Italy (1935 World Record) – K 108
- Stadio del Trampolino, Pragelato, Italy (2006 Winter Olympics, World Cup) 140 | 125
- Trampolino Fratelli Nogara, Tarvisio, Italy (2003 Universiade) – HS 100, HS 36, HS 25, K 11, K 7
- Jarolímek, Štrbské Pleso, Slovakia (1935 World Championships)
- Jumping Park, Muju, South Korea (constructed for the 1997 Universiade) – HS 133, HS 101, K 60, K 35
- Källviksbacken, Falun, Sweden (1954 World Championships)
- Hallstabacken, Sollefteå, Sweden (1934 World Championships, Junior WCH 2003) 120 | 107
- Olympiaschanze, St. Moritz, Switzerland (1928 and 1948 Winter Olympics)
- Papoose Peak Jumps, Squaw Valley, California (1960 Winter Olympics) – P-80, P-60, P-40
- Copper Peak, Ironwood, Michigan, United States (first ever ski flying hill in the western hemisphere, currently being updated) K160

== See also ==
- List of Olympic venues in ski jumping
