= Harris Hill Ski Jump =

Vermont ski jump

Coordinates: 42.8599°N 72.5716°W

Harris Hill
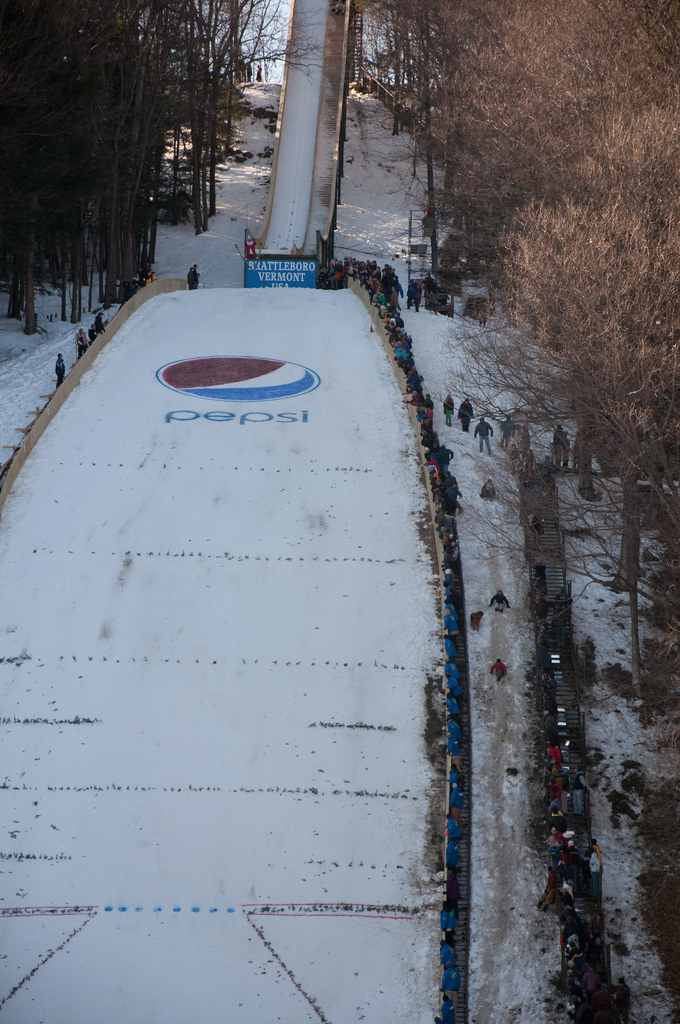
- Harris Hill, 2009
- Location: Brattleboro, Vermont; United States
- Opened: 1922
- Renovated: 2009

Size
- K–point: 88 m
- Hill size: 98 m
- Hill record: Blaž Pavlič; 104 m

Harris Hill Ski Jump is a ski jumping hill in Brattleboro, Vermont which hosts annual ski jumping competitions. The original jump was built in 1922, and was closed for renovation in 2005. The jump reopened in 2009 after a $600,000 renovation.

The jump is designed to international standards for ski jumps, reaching an Olympic-calibre Normal hill size. FIS certification was granted in 2011. In 2022 lights were installed for night events. The jump has hosted 9 national championships and the Olympic Qualifier events.
