= Chippewa Falls Ski Jump =

Ski jumping hill in Wisconsin, United States

- Location: Chippewa Falls, Wisconsin, US
- Coordinates: 44°56′41.885″N 91°21′58.942″W
- Opened: 1909

Size
- K–point: K40
- Hill record: 42.1 m (138 ft) (Norway) Oscar Gundersen (24 January 1909)

Chippewa Falls Ski Jump was a K40 ski jumping hill located in Chippewa Falls, Wisconsin, United States, opened in 1909.

== History ==
On 24 January 1909, Oscar Gundersen set the only official world record on this hill at 42.1 metres (138 feet).

== Ski jumping world record ==
No.	Date	Name	Country	Metres	Feet
#16	24 January 1909	Oscar Gundersen	Norway	42.1	138
