= Jay Martin (ski jumper) =

American ski jumper

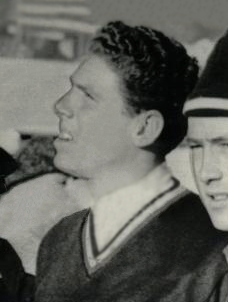
- Martin in 1966

Personal information
- Born: September 8, 1944 (age 81) Minneapolis, Minnesota, U.S.
- Height: 180 cm (5 ft 11 in)
- Weight: 83 kg (183 lb)

Sport
- Sport: Ski Jumping
- Club: Minneapolis Ski Club

Jay Warren Martin (born September 8, 1944) is an American former ski jumper. In 1968 he won the national title, and placed 43rd in the large hill event at the 1968 Winter Olympics. In retirement he worked for the Minneapolis Ski Club, and was active as a ski judge. His younger brother Jerry also became an Olympic ski jumper.
