= Roy Mikkelsen =

American ski jumper (1907–1967)

- Born: September 15, 1907; Kongsberg, Norway
- Died: October 29, 1967 (aged 60)

Roy Mikkelsen (September 15, 1907 – October 29, 1967) was a Norwegian born, American Olympic ski jumper. Mikkelsen was US Champion in ski jumping in 1933 and 1935, but was also a strong skier in the new discipline of alpine skiing, competing in that sport from 1933–42.

== Personal life ==
Roy Mikkelsen was born at Kongsberg in Buskerud, Norway and emigrated to the United States in 1924, settling in Chicago where he joined the Norge Ski Club which had been formed by Norwegian immigrants nearby in Fox River Grove.

== Career ==
He competed in ski jumping at the 1932 Winter Olympics in Lake Placid, and at the 1936 Winter Olympics in Garmisch-Partenkirchen. Mikkelsen finished out of the medals in both 1932 at Lake Placid and at the 1936 games in Germany. But he was thought of so highly by the team in 1936 that he was named its captain. Mikkelsen was poised to participate in a third Olympics in 1940 but the event was cancelled because of the outbreak of World War II. During the war, he would put his ski and snow experience to good use as an officer in the Army’s 10th Mountain Division, fighting in Italy.

Mikkelsen eventually settled in Auburn, California where he was elected mayor in 1952 and competed there for the Auburn Ski Club in Soda Springs. Active in civic affairs, Mikkelsen worked with the Bid Committee that brought the 1960 Winter Olympics to Squaw Valley. He served on the Auburn City Council, including two years as mayor in 1952 and 1953. And 24 years after his last Olympic Games as a skier, Mikkelsen was the center of attention again when he lit a torch in Auburn’s Central Square to mark the coming of the Olympics to Placer County – up the newly paved Interstate 80 at Squaw Valley.

He was instrumental in the Auburn Ski Club and the development of Boreal Mountain Resort. Mikkelsen died in 1967 at 60, three years after being elected to the National Ski Hall of Fame in 1964. In Auburn, Mikkelsen Drive was named after him. At Boreal Mountain Resort, a statue of Mikkelsen has been erected outside the Western Ski Sport Museum.

== Related Reading ==
- Heimark, Bruce H. (1994) The OSS Norwegian Special Operations Group in World War II (Praeger) ISBN 978-0275948603
- Antonucci, David C. (2012) Snowball's Chance: The Story of the 1960 Olympic Winter Games Squaw Valley & Lake Tahoe (BookSurge Publishing) ISBN 978-1439259047
