= Joe Holland (skier) =

American skier and ski jumper

Joseph Johnston Holland (born December 11, 1964) is an American former Nordic combined skier and ski jumper who competed in the late 1980s and early 1990s.

== Biography ==
Holland's best finish at the Olympic Winter Games was eighth in the 3 x 10 km event at the 1992 Winter Olympics in Albertville, France. Holland also competed at the 1988 Winter Olympics in Calgary, Alberta, Canada.

A native of Norwich, Vermont, Holland was the leading U.S. Nordic combined skier in the late 1980s to early 1990s (4 time national champion). Holland's top world cup finish was 11th place twice (1991, 1992), and he was among the top 10 at the World Junior Championships in his last year as a junior.

== Family life ==
Holland's brothers Mike Holland and Jim Holland also competed in the Olympic Winter Games.
