= Chris Hastings (ski jumper) =

American ski jumper

Christopher Scott Hastings (born August 17, 1964) is a champion ski jumper born in Hanover, New Hampshire.

== Biography ==
Chris attended the University of Vermont, and was the normal hill US ski jumping champion in both 1985 and 1987. This qualified him for the 1988 Olympics in Calgary, where he placed 49th overall in the Individual Men's Large Hill ski jumping event. He went on to coach ski jumping for the Ford-Sayre Memorial Ski Council in Hanover, New Hampshire and for the New York Ski Education Foundation. For this, the United States Ski and Snowboard Association honored him with an International Jumping Coach of Year award in 1992.

He is the brother of Jeff Hastings, a member of the US ski jumping team for the 1984 Olympics.
