= Utah Olympic Park Jumps =

Ski jumping venue in Park City, Utah

Coordinates: 40.7088°N 111.5599°W

- Olympic Park
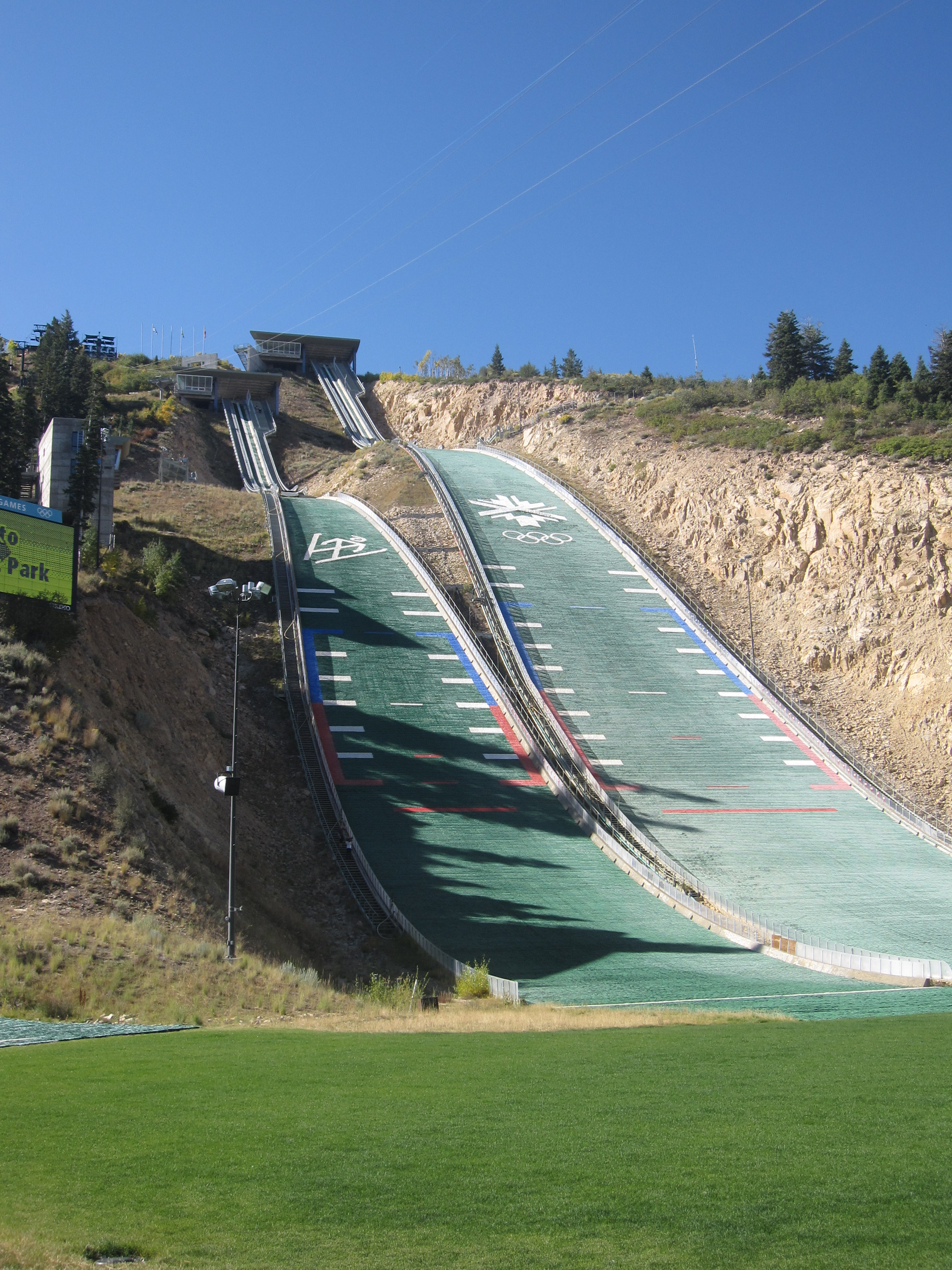
- Location: Utah Olympic Park; Park City, Utah; United States
- Opened: 2001

Size
- K–point: K-90; K-120
- Hill size: HS100; HS134
- Hill record: (Germany) Sven Hannawald (99.0 m in 2002) (Poland) Adam Malysz (133.5 m in 2001)

Top events
- Olympics: 2002

The Utah Olympic Park Jumps is a ski jumping venue at the Utah Olympic Park in Park City, Utah, United States. It is a venue in the FIS Ski jumping World Cup and hosted ski jumping at the 2002 Winter Olympics, a role it is expected to reprise for the 2034 Winter Olympics.

Salt Lake City won its 1995 bid to host the 2002 Winter Olympics, and plans were developed to expand the park. On October 9, 1997 SLOC approved the plan to spend an additional $48 million to upgrade and expand the recently completed park. The plans called for replacing and moving the existing 90-meter ski jump, and building a brand new 120-meter jump.

During summer months, both hills are covered in a special plastic and visitors can go tubing down them in an inner tube with a hard bottom.
