= Jim Holland (ski jumper) =

American ski jumper

Personal information
- Full name: James H. Holland
- Born: July 4, 1967 (age 59) Hanover, New Hampshire, U.S.
- Height: 5 ft 6 in (168 cm)

Sport
- Sport: Skiing

James H. Holland (born July 4, 1967) is an American former ski jumper. He competed in the 1992 Winter Olympics in Albertville, France, and the 1994 Winter Olympics in Lillehammer, Norway.

== Biography ==
A native of Norwich, Vermont, he was a six time U.S. national champion. He is a co-founder and executive chairman of the board of Backcountry.com.

== Family life ==
Holland's brothers Mike Holland and Joe Holland also competed in the Olympic Winter Games in ski jumping and Nordic combined respectively.
