= Rick Mewborn =

American ski jumper

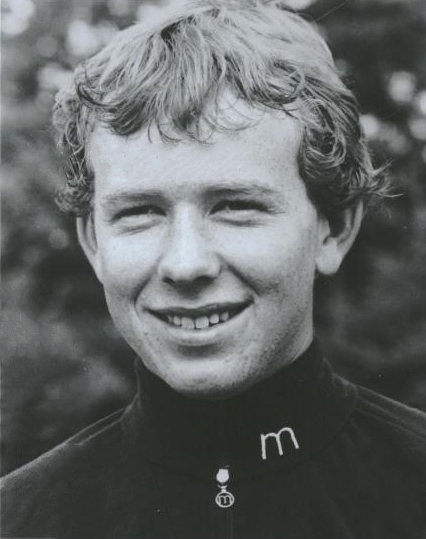
- Mewborn in 1985

Personal information
- Born: March 28, 1965 (age 60) Carlsbad, New Mexico, U.S.
- Height: 173 cm (5 ft 8 in)
- Weight: 62 kg (137 lb)

Sport
- Sport: Ski Jumping

Richard Lee "Rick" Mewborn (born March 28, 1965) is an American former ski jumper. He competed in the 1988 Winter Olympics and placed 54th in the normal hill.

Mewborn won the U.S. titles in the normal hill in 1986 and in the large hill in 1987. He took up ski jumping at Howelsen Hill in Colorado, and later trained ski jumpers there. He also runs an excavation company. Mewborn is a member of the American Ski Jumping Hall of Fame.
