= Reed Zuehlke =

American ski jumper

Reed Zuehlke, born Reed Johann Zuehlke on October 26, 1960 in Eau Claire, Wisconsin., was an athlete from the United States in the ski jumping competition at the 1980 Winter Olympics in Lake Placid and the 1984 Winter Olympics in Sarajevo.

== Biography ==
Zuehlke was the U.S. national champion in 1982 for the normal hill event, his best finish in World Cup competition was sixth in 1979. Outside of ski jumping, Zuehlke studied business at the University of Wisconsin-Eau Claire and DePaul University. He later worked with United Airlines from 1986–2003 and used to work for JetBlue Airways. He recently was hired by Gladiator Tech.

== Olympic results ==
Year	Event	Place
1980	Men's Large Hill Individual	45
1984	Men's Large Hill Individual	29
