= Mike Holland (ski jumper) =

American ski jumper

Personal information
- Full name: Michael Harry Holland
- Nationality: United States
- Born: 9 December 1961 (age 64) Norwich, Vermont, USA
- Height: 1.78 m (5 ft 10 in)

Sport
- Sport: Skiing

World Cup career
- Seasons: 1983–1990; 1992
- Indiv. starts: 74
- Indiv. podiums: 5
- Indiv. wins: 1

Achievements and titles
- Personal bests: 186 m (610 ft); Planica, 15 March 1985
- Updated on 10 February 2016

Michael Harry Holland (born 9 December 1961) is an American former ski jumper. He was world distance record holder for 27 minutes, surpassed shortly after by Matti Nykänen in 1985.

== Biography ==
A native of Norwich, Vermont, Holland was a five time U.S. national champion. Holland competed in the 1984 Winter Olympics in Sarajevo and the 1988 Winter Olympics in Calgary, Alberta, Canada.

On 15 March 1985, he set the ski jumping distance world record at 186 metres (610 ft) on Velikanka bratov Gorišek in Planica, Slovenia. And became only the second man to jump over 600 feet barrier. This world record was held for only 27 minutes before Finnish jumper Matti Nykänen passed his mark with a jump one meter longer.

Holland had five top ten world cup results including a 1st-place finish in Bischofshofen, Austria in 1989; three 2nd-place finishes in Harrachov, Thunder Bay and Planica; and 3rd place in Lahti.

== World Cup ==
=== Standings ===
Season	Overall	4H
1982/83	15	17
1983/84	22	92
1984/85	10	29
1985/86	29	34
1986/87	34	82
1987/88	30	65
1988/89	11	8
1989/90	—	—
1991/92	34	—

=== Wins ===
No.	Season	Date	Location	Hill	Size
1	1988/89	6 January 1989	(Austria) Bischofshofen	Paul-Ausserleitner-Schanze K111	LH

== Ski jumping world record ==
Date	Hill	Location	Metres	Feet
15 March 1985	Velikanka bratov Gorišek K185	Planica, Yugoslavia	186	610

== Family life ==
His younger brothers Joe Holland and Jim Holland were also U.S. national champions, Joe competed in the Nordic combined and Jim competed in ski jumping. Both competed on the world cup circuit and in the Olympic Winter Games.

Records
Preceded by Matti Nykänen	World's longest ski jump 15 March 1985 – 15 March 1985	Succeeded by Matti Nykänen
