= Jerry Martin (ski jumper) =

American ski jumper

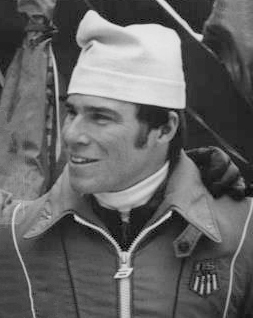
- Martin in 1976

Personal information
- Born: August 18, 1950 (age 75) Minneapolis, Minnesota, U.S.
- Height: 175 cm (5 ft 9 in)
- Weight: 73 kg (161 lb)

Sport
- Sport: Ski jumping

Jerry Kenneth Martin (born August 18, 1950) is an American former ski jumper. He competed in the normal hill and large hill at the 1972 and 1976 Olympics and placed 27th–36th. In the 1972 Olympics, he competed with one eye.

In September 1971, Martin lost the right eye in an accident. Yet he won the national ski jumping title in 1971, 1973, and 1975, and competed at the 1970 and 1974 world championships. In 1971 he set the Pine Mountain jump record at 345 feet (105 m).
