= Jeff Hastings =

American ski jumper

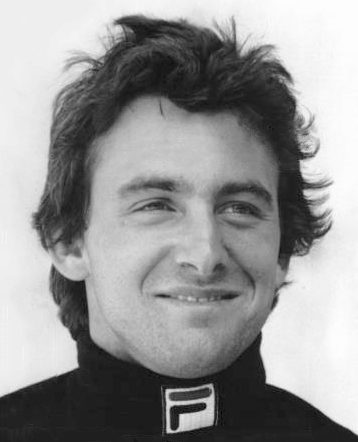

Personal information
- Full name: Jeffrey Paul Hastings
- Nationality: United States
- Born: June 25, 1959 (age 67) Mountain Home, Idaho, U.S.
- Height: 1.73 m (5 ft 8 in)

Sport
- Sport: Skiing

World Cup career
- Seasons: 1980–1984
- Indiv. starts: 75
- Indiv. podiums: 6
- Indiv. wins: 1
- Updated on February 10, 2016

Jeffrey Paul Hastings (born June 25, 1959) is an American former ski jumper who competed at the 1984 Winter Olympics in Sarajevo. He is a longtime ski jumping analyst for televised coverage of Winter Olympics competitions. He was named one of the 50 Greatest Sports Figures from Vermont by Sports Illustrated.

== Career ==
When competing at the 1984 Olympic Winter Games, Hastings finished fourth on the large hill, placing just behind Pavel Ploc of Czechoslovakia, 0.2 of a point out of the medals. This was the best American finish in ski jumping since the 1920s. Hastings finished fourth overall on the World Cup circuit in 1984, was US national champion four times, and won a World Cup in Lake Placid on the large hill in 1983.

== World cup ==
=== Standings ===
Season	Overall	4H
1980/81	50	—
1981/82	20	60
1982/83	11	16
1983/84	4	9

=== Wins ===
No.	Season	Date	Location	Hill	Size
1	1983/84	18 December 1983	(United States) Lake Placid	MacKenzie Intervale K114	LH

== Personal life ==
Hastings is a graduate of Williams College (1981) and the Tuck School of Business at Dartmouth College (1990). Since retiring from competition in 1985, he has served as a television ski-jumping analyst for several Winter Olympic Games, from Calgary 1988 to Vancouver 2010.

Hastings is the President of PRO-CUT International, an automotive specialty product supply company located in West Lebanon, New Hampshire. He lives in Hanover, New Hampshire, with his wife and three children. Hastings' younger brother Chris Hastings competed in the Olympic Winter Games in Calgary in 1988 and was a two-time national champion.
