= Steamboat Springs Winter Sports Club =

- Abbreviation: SSWSC
- Established: 1914
- Type: Multi-sport club
- Location(s): Training facilities: Howelsen Hill and Mt. Werner
- Members: 812 participants
- Executive Director: Sarah Floyd
- Subsidiaries: 67 programs
- Staff: ~125
- Website: www.sswsc.org

The Steamboat Springs Winter Sports Club (SSWSC) is located in Steamboat Springs, Colorado. SSWSC has produced 88 Winter Olympians, including 14 sent to the 2014 Winter Games in Sochi. Some of the more well-known Olympians including 6-time Olympian Todd Lodwick, 5-time Olympian Billy Demong, 1992 Bronze Medalist Nelson Carmichael, 2002 Silver Medalist Travis Mayer, and Caroline Lalive.

== Winter Sports training ==
The SSWSC is a multi-sport ski club located in Steamboat Springs, Colorado, that provides winter and summer athletic programming. It is the oldest ski club west of the Mississippi River. Its home ski area is Howelsen Hill, owned and operated by the City of Steamboat Springs. That area provides terrain for most of the winter sports, and has lights for night operations. The Steamboat Ski Area provides the club and its athletes much support on the slopes of its 4,000 acres (16 km^{2}). The SSWSC was selected by the US Ski Team as its national Club of the Year in 2007, 2004, and 1999.

There are four main types of skiing/snowboarding in the SSWSC.

=== Alpine Skiing/Racing ===
The Alpine skiing branch of the SSWSC is the largest branch, with about 400 children. The racers enrolled are split into development and competition racers when they are young. The SSWSC coaching staff teaches fundamentals to the young racers. Approximately 60 coaches work with this program. They train at Howelsen Hill and Mt. Werner.

=== Freestyle ===
The SSWSC freestyle program is one of the best in the country. They have about 175 athletes, ages 7 through adult, training in mogul skiing, aerials, half pipe, skier cross, freeskier and telemark skiing. Nineteen coaches handle the coaching duties and athletes train at Howelsen Hill and Mt. Werner, in the Steamboat Ski area.

=== Nordic ===
The SSWSC Nordic Program includes cross country, special (Nordic) jumping, Nordic combined and biathlon. Approximately 160 athletes participate and are instructed by a staff of 23 coaches. This program has produced a large number of national team members for the US Ski Team in their respective sports. They train at the Howelsen Hill ski area, which has one of the most complete Nordic jumping complexes in North America. The Nordic Combined program was recognized as USSA's program of the year in the 2006/07 ski season.

=== Snowboard ===
The SSWSC Snowboard program was selected as the top program in the country in 2006/07 and awarded the Snowboard Program of the Year. They have approximately 170 athletes, and a staff of 25 coaches. The program includes instruction in freestyle snowboarding, alpine snowboarding, and boardercross. This group trains at Howelsen Hill and Mt. Werner.

== Notable members ==
- Arielle Gold (born 1996), Olympic bronze medalist, Junior World Champion, and World Champion snowboarder
- Taylor Gold (born 1993), Olympian snowboarder
