= Utah Olympic Park =

Winter sports park in Summit County, Utah, U.S.

- Interactive map of Utah Olympic Park
- Former names: Utah Winter Sports Park
- Location: 3419 Olympic Parkway; Park City, Utah, U.S.
- Coordinates: 40.71207°N 111.56193°W
- Owner: Utah Athletic Foundation
- Type: Winter Sports Park

Construction
- Built: 1991–1997
- Opened: January 9, 1993 (Ski jumps); January 25, 1997 (Track)
- Expanded: 1998–2001

Website
- utaholympiclegacy.org/location/utah-olympic-park/

The Utah Olympic Park is a winter sports complex in the United States built for the 2002 Winter Olympics, located in Summit County northwest of Park City, Utah, United States. The park consists of the Utah Olympic Park Jumps and the Utah Olympic Park Track. During the 2002 Games, these venues at the park hosted competitions in bobsleigh, skeleton, luge, ski jumping, and Nordic combined. Since the Olympics, the park has continued to operate as a training center for athletes and is scheduled to reprise its role as an Olympic venue during the 2034 Winter Olympics, hosting bobsleigh, luge, skeleton, ski jumping, Nordic combined, snowboarding (cross and parallel), and freestyle skiing (ski cross) events.

== History ==
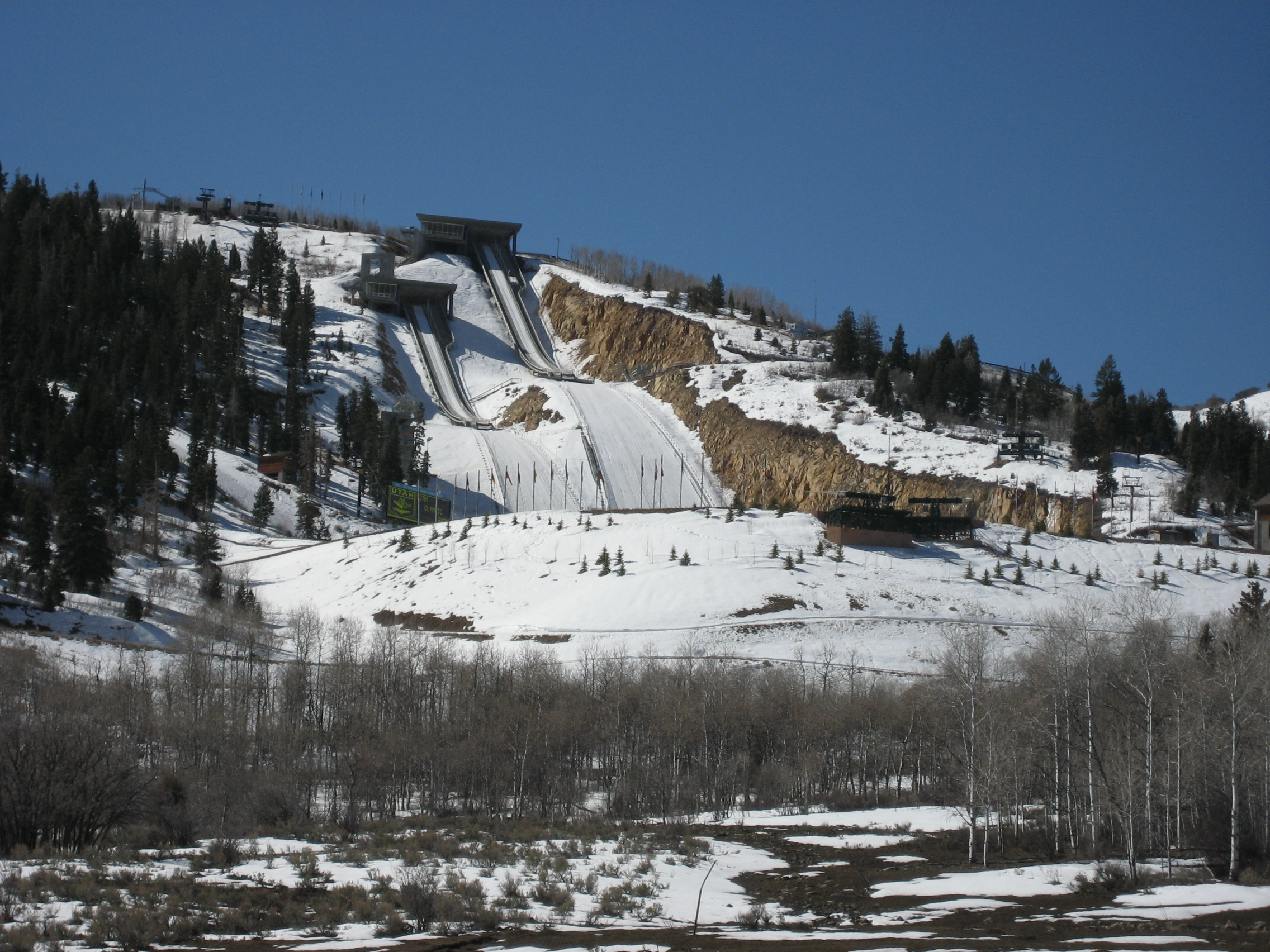
The park as seen from the base of a hill on a warm winter day, March 2007

Like the Utah Olympic Oval and Soldier Hollow, the park was designed and built specifically for the Olympic games under the supervision of the Salt Lake Organizing Committee (SLOC). The 1989 Olympic referendum, passed by Utahns, allowed for taxpayer money to fund a winter sports park, which would be used if Salt Lake City won its bid for either the 1998 or 2002 Winter Olympics; Olympic funds and revenue would then be used to repay the state. In 1990 the Utah Sports Authority announced their plans to build the park, which included ski jumps and a bobsled-luge track, in Bear Hollow near Park City. Before construction on the park began, it faced criticism from local landowners and citizens of Summit County, concerned over traffic and environmental effects. Construction got underway following a groundbreaking ceremony on May 29, 1991. The original estimated park cost was $26.3 million and included the ski jumps, bobsled-luge track, and a day lodge, all to be completed by September 1992. The majority of the park was designed and engineered by Eckhoff, Watson, and Preator Engineering, and its joint venture partner, Van Boerum & Frank Associates, all of Salt Lake City.

After Salt Lake City lost its bid to host the 1998 Winter Olympics in 1991, the Utah Sports Authority gained permission from the United States Olympic Committee (USOC) to slow down construction on the park, extending its planned opening date. Four of the park's ski jumps (18, 38, 65 and 90 meters) were completed and opened on December 12, 1992, and were formally dedicated in a ceremony on January 9, 1993. On July 31, 1993 the summer training facilities at the park, which included a ski jumping pool, were dedicated. The park's day lodge, located near the base of the jumps, was completed in late summer 1993.

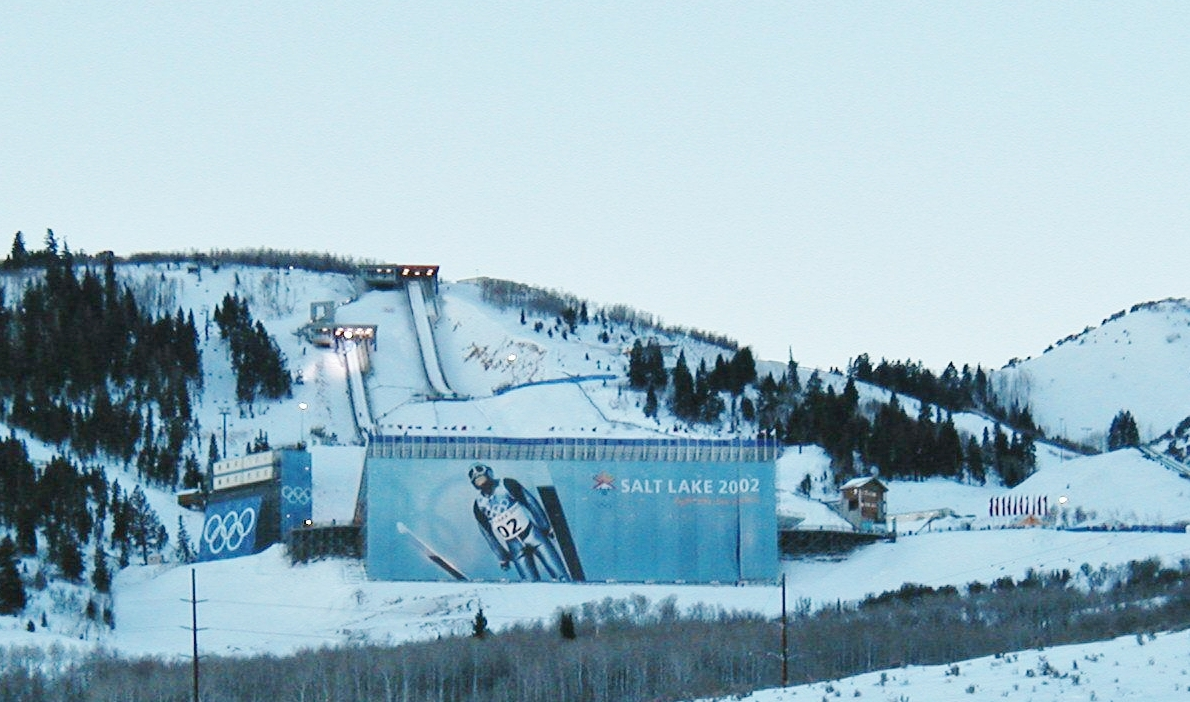
The park, with temporary spectator seating, during the 2002 Winter Olympics, February 2002

A groundbreaking ceremony on June 3, 1994 signaled the start of construction on the bobsled-luge track. The track was completed December 28, 1996 and its grand opening ceremony was held on January 25, 1997. The very first run on the new track was by luger Jon Owen on January 10, 1997. Following the completion of the track it was decided to reintroduce skeleton as an Olympic event during the 2002 Winter Olympics and plans called to use the track to host all three sliding events.

While construction was progressing on the track, Salt Lake City won its 1995 bid to host the 2002 Winter Olympics, and plans were developed to expand the park. On 9 October 1997, SLOC okayed the plan to spend an additional $48 million to upgrade and expand the recently completed park. The plans called for replacing and moving the existing 90-meter ski jump and building a new 120-meter jump. Also, the construction of starting houses on the track, chairlifts, storage buildings, new access roads, pedestrian bridges, parking lots, and sewer and water lines were all part of the expansion plan. The upgrade of the park began during the Summer of 1998, with the majority of expansion work completed by fall 2000. Ownership of the park was transferred from the Utah Sports Authority to SLOC on July 14, 1999. Soon after, in Spring 2000, the name "Utah Winter Sports Park" became the "Utah Olympic Park'.

=== The park today ===
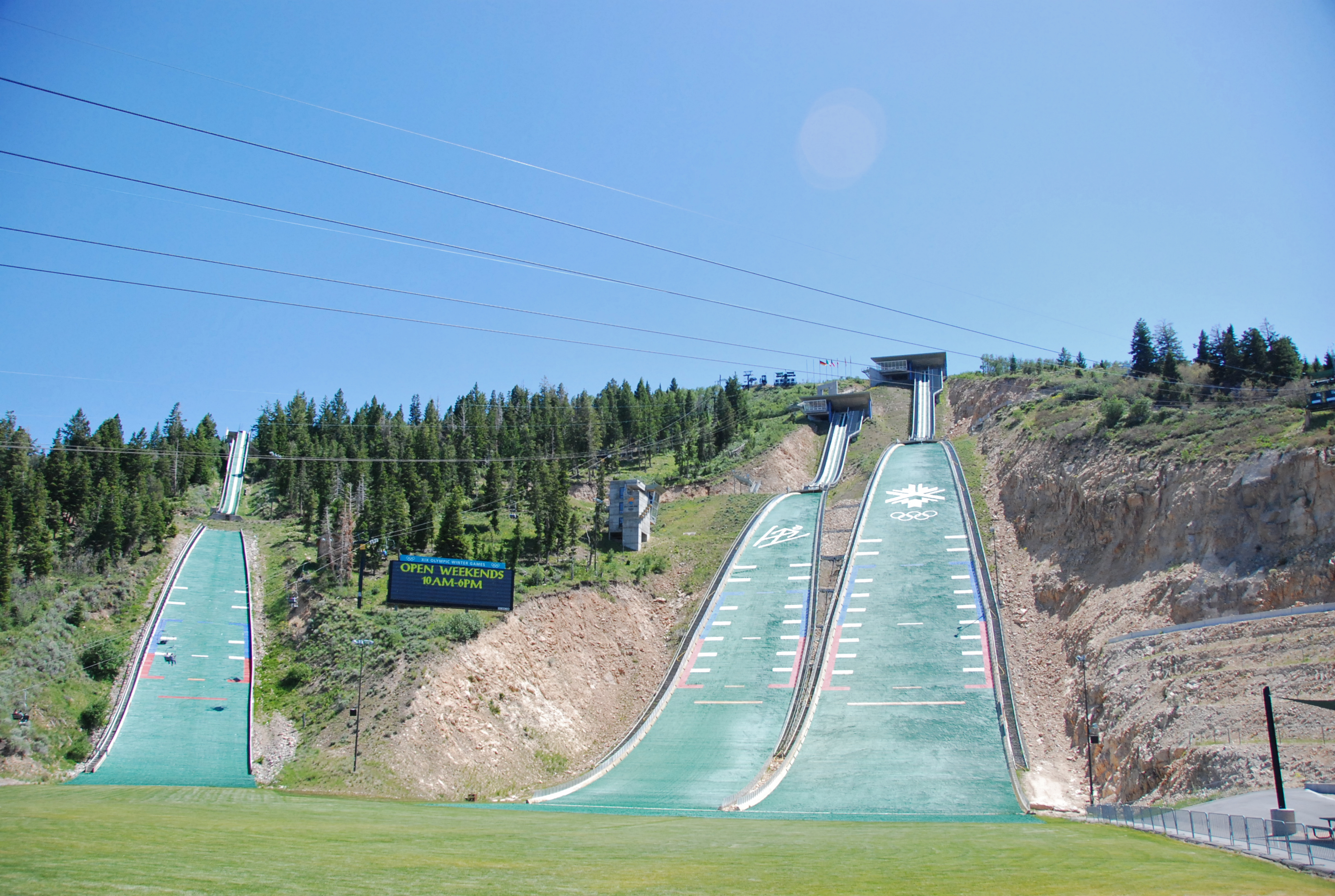
Three of the park's ski jumps shown during the summer, June 2007

The park still serves as a training center for Olympic and development level athletes, as well as a recreational highlight in the state. Other facilities in addition to the ski jumps and bobsled track located on-site include the Joe Quinney Winter Sports Center (which houses the Alf Engen Ski Museum and the Eccles Salt Lake 2002 Olympic Winter Games Museum), a day lodge, a summer aerial training splash pool, zip lines, and a mountain coaster.

With Salt Lake City to host the Winter Olympics again in 2034, the park will be used again for the games.

== See also ==
- Utah Olympic Park Jumps
- Utah Olympic Park Track
- Salt Lake 2002 Olympic Cauldron Park
