= Leavenworth Ski Hill =

Ski resort in Chelan County, Washington

- Location in Washington Leavenworth Ski Hill (the United States)
- Location: Leavenworth, Washington, United States
- Nearest city: Leavenworth
- Coordinates: 47°36′52″N 120°40′07″W
- Lift system: 2 surface lifts
- Website: Leavenworth Winter Sports Club
- Leavenworth Ski Hill Historic District
- U.S. National Register of Historic Places
- U.S. Historic district
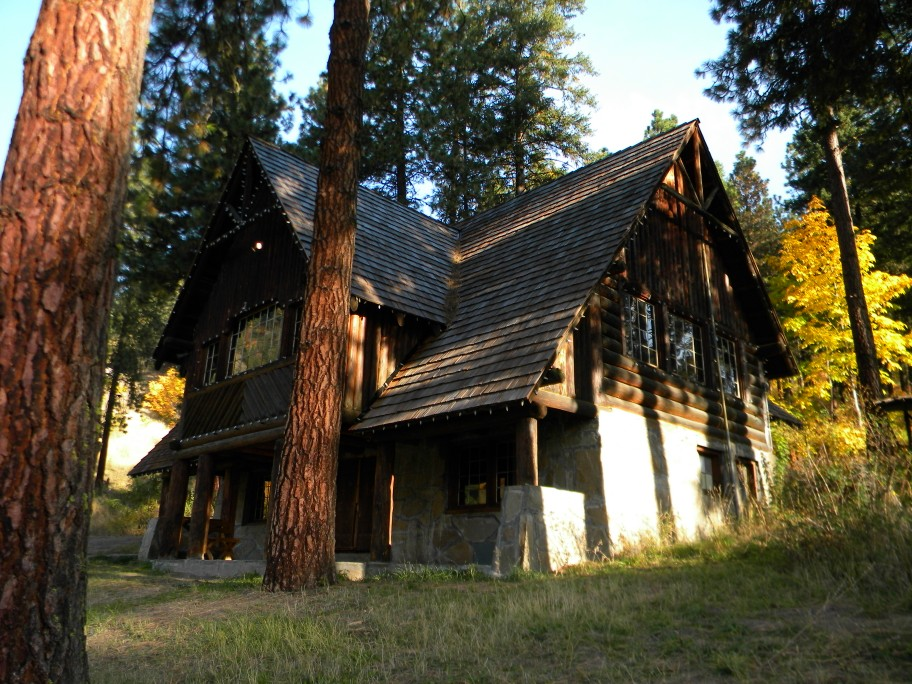
- Ski Hill Lodge in 2013

- Location within Washington (state)
- Location: 10701 Ski Hill Drive, Leavenworth, Washington
- Coordinates: 47°36′51″N 120°40′13″W
- Area: 17 acres (6.9 ha)
- Built: 1936
- Architect: Civilian Conservation Corps; Leavenworth Winter Sports Club
- Architectural style: Rustic
- NRHP reference No.: 13000505
- Added to NRHP: July 17, 2013

The Leavenworth Ski Hill is a small ski area and an historic district located at the end of Ski Hill Drive in Leavenworth, Washington, United States. The facility is located inside the Wenatchee National Forest. Operated by Leavenworth Winter Sports Club, the facility includes two small downhill ski hills, 26 km of cross-country ski trails, a ski jump, and a tubing hill.

The Leavenworth Ski Hill Historic District was added to National Register of Historic Places in 2013. It encompasses a 17 acres (6.9 ha) area, comprising a total of 5 contributing properties and 3 non-contributing properties. The contributing properties are:

- The Ski Hill site itself
- The 2 ½ story Ski Hill Lodge built in 1936
- The 90-meter (Class A) Bakke Hill Sky Jump originally built in 1930 and rebuilt in 1957
- The Men's Restroom built c. 1938
- The Ticket Booth, formerly a garage, built in 1940
