= Howelsen Hill Ski Area =

Ski resort in Colorado, United States

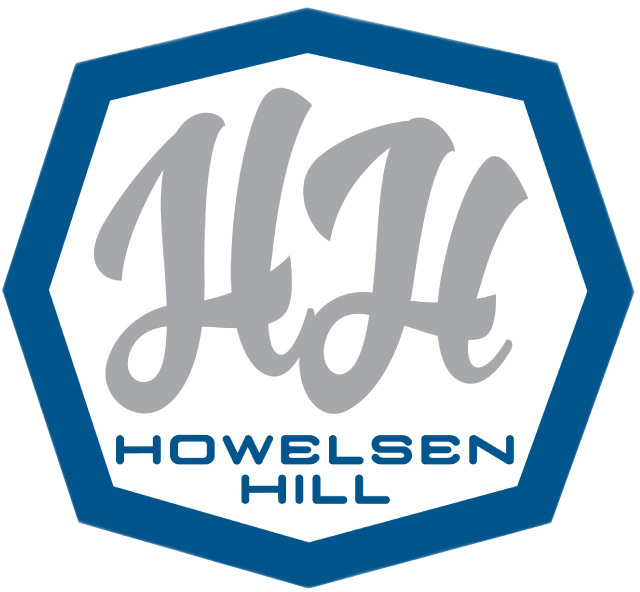

- Location within the United States Location within Colorado
- Location: Steamboat Springs, Colorado, U.S.
- Nearest city: Steamboat Springs
- Coordinates: 40.483°N 106.839°W
- Status: Operating
- Owner: Steamboat Springs, Colorado (Parks & Recreation)
- Vertical: 440 ft (134 m)
- Top elevation: 7,136 ft (2,175 m)
- Base elevation: 6,696 ft (2,041 m)
- Skiable area: 50 acres (0.2 km^{2})
- Trails: 17 alpine 9 nordic
- Lift system: 4 lifts: Triple chairlift; Poma surface lift; Boardwalk carpet; Tube Howelsen carpet
- Snowfall: 170 in (432 cm)
- Snowmaking: 50%
- Website: steamboatsprings.net

Howelsen Hill Ski Area is a small ski area located on Howelsen Hill in Steamboat Springs, Colorado. It is not a typical alpine ski area, as it includes a series of ski jumps, the largest with HS127.

== History ==
The ski area has produced 89 Olympians in both alpine and Nordic events. With a vertical drop of 134 metres (440 ft), it has one chairlift, two carpets, and one Poma lift.

The local youth ski team, the Steamboat Springs Winter Sports Club, practices at the area, along with various ski jumpers in training, including U.S. Ski Team Jumpers.

In 1914 ski area with hill was officially opened, and ready for the second annual Steamboat Springs Winter Sports Carnival next year, as first edition was still held at another location. This is the oldest continuously operating ski area in North America. Originally called Elk Park, it was renamed to Howelsen Hill in 1917, after Norwegian immigrant Karl Hovelsen who established the resort. The alpine area was established in 1931.

Howelsen Hill Ski Area has sent more skiers to international competition than any other area in North America and has the largest, natural ski jumping complex in North America.

Howelsen has been the training ground for 89 Olympians making over 130 Winter Olympic appearances, 15 members of the Colorado Ski Hall of Fame, and 6 members of the National Ski Hall of fame. Howelsen Hill is open to the public and is owned and operated by the City of Steamboat Springs Parks, Open Space and Recreation Department. It was renovated in 1931, 1948, 1959, 1977 and 2001.

== Ski jumping world records ==
On 18 February 1916, American Ragnar Omtvedt set the first of two official world records, landing at 192.9 feet (58.8 meters).

On 2 March 1917, American Henry Hall set the second and last official world record on this hill at 203 feet (62 meters).

On 28 February 1919, American Lars Haugen at 212 feet (65 meters) and his brother Anders Haugen at 205 feet (62 meters) both fell at world record distance.

On 29 February 1920, American Anders Haugen fell at world record distance at 218 feet (66 meters).

No.	Date	Name	Country	Metres	Feet
#23	18 February 1916	Ragnar Omtvedt	United States	58.5	192.9
#24	2 March 1917	Henry Hall	United States	61.9	203
F	28 February 1919	Lars Haugen	United States	64.6	212
F	28 February 1919	Anders Haugen	United States	62.5	205
F	29 February 1920	Anders Haugen	United States	66.4	218
