= Ski jumping hill =

Venue used for ski jumping

Overview of a ski jumping hill

A ski jumping hill is a sports venue used for ski jumping. They vary in size from temporary handmade snow structures to permanent competition venues. At the top is an in-run where the jumper runs down to generate sufficient speed, before reaching the jump. The skier is then airborne until landing on the landing slope. The last part of the hill is the out-run, which may be either flat or even uphill, allowing the jumper to stop. The construction point (K point) is used to determine the distance points for a particular length. The size of a hill is measured in the hill size. Hills with a hill size exceeding HS185 are designated ski flying hills; there are five such hills in the world.

== Structure ==
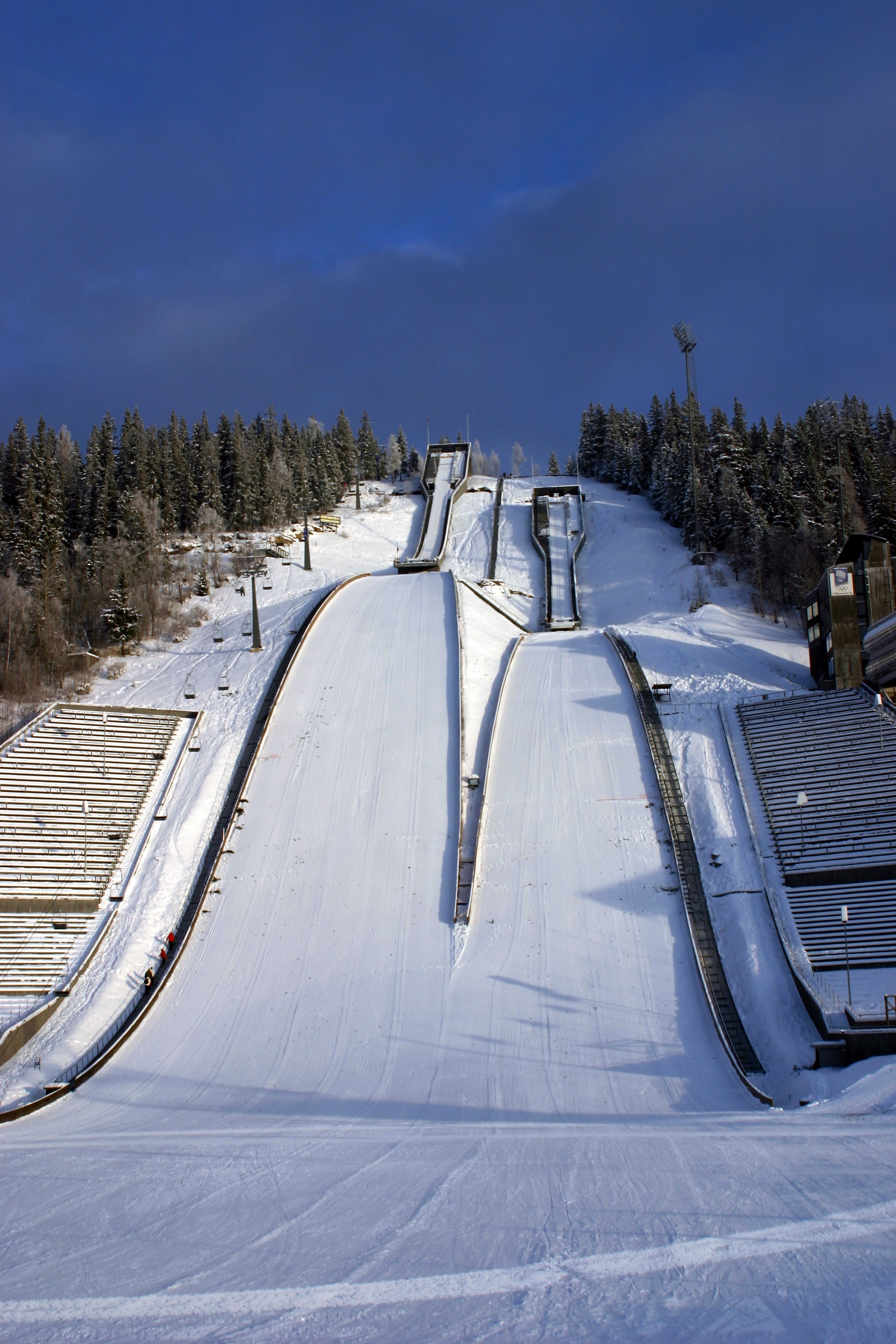
The twin hills of Lysgårdsbakken in Lillehammer, Norway: the normal HS100 hill to the right, the large HS138 hill to the left

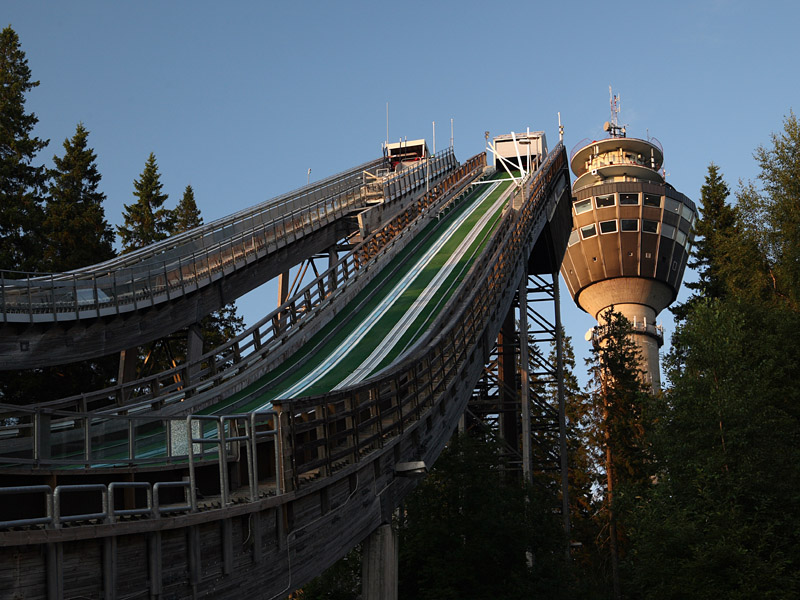
Ski jump at Puijo in Kuopio, Finland

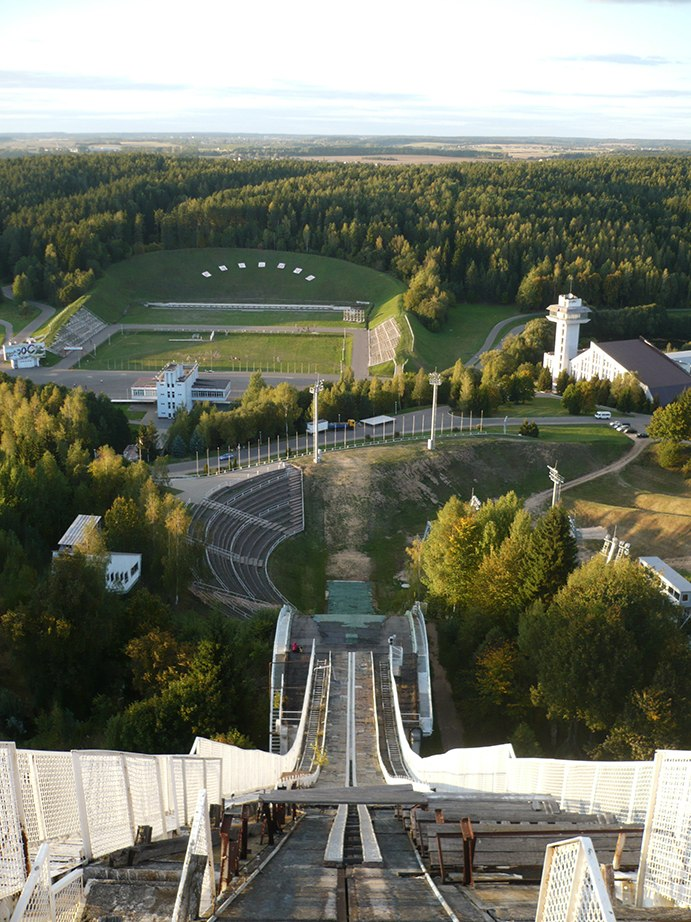
View of the sports complex «Raubichi» from top of the ski jump in Minsk, Belarus

The top of the hill is the start. This allows the jury to regulate the speed of the jumpers in varying wind conditions, by shortening or lengthening the distance along the in-run. The platform has a bar across it, which the jumper sits on. By leaning forward, the jumper will naturally start to glide down the prepared tracks along the in-run. The in-run normally has an angle of 38 to 36 degrees, which then curves into a transition; the last part of the in-run, the take-off table, is a short straight section which typically has an angle between 7 and 12 degrees downhill. The speed of the skier is normally measured about 10 meters (33 ft) before the end of the takeoff; jumpers can reach speeds of 95 kilometers per hour (59 mph) on large hills and 105 kilometers per hour (65 mph) on ski flying hills.

The landing slope has a smooth curve which closely follows the profile of the ski jump; this means that the skier is never more than about 6 meters (20 ft) above the ground. The first part of the slope is known as the knoll. It is located between the take-off and the landing area; here the slope inclination increases. After the knoll, the nominal landing area begins at the norm point (also known as the P point), where the slope is the steepest. From there, the inclination slowly decreases as the landing area follows through the construction point (K point) down to the L point, beyond which a safe landing is no longer guaranteed. The distance from the take-off to the end of the landing area is called a hill size. Past the landing slope is the outrun, which is either flat or even uphill, where the skier can slow down.

The classic Nordic jump ramp for horizontal distance differs from the higher angle freestyle kicker takeoff which emphasizes vertical height to enable aerial flips and twists.

In 2004, the International Ski Federation replaced the calculation point as the measurement of the size of a hill with hill size. The hill size is the length from the takeoff in a straight line to the knoll and then along the level of the landing slope to the hill size point. The hill size point is calculated based on the technical data of a hill based on radius, angle of inclination and record distance. The calculation point or K-point is slightly further up in the hill, and is still used for the calculation of distance points, which along with style points determine the winner of an event. For hills up to large, the scoring system grants 60 points to jumps which reach the critical point. For ski flying hills, 120 points are granted for the critical point length. Based on the hill's length, distance points are calculated, which are added for each meter beyond the critical point and subtracted for each point shorter than the critical point. A meter has more distance points in smaller hills. Hills also have a fall line; a jumper who falls or otherwise touches the ground with their body after the fall line is not penalized.

The measuring of a distance in a hill was traditionally done by people who were positioned along the hill, who would signal where the skier landed. This has been supplanted by an advanced video system, which allows measurements in 0.5-meter increments.

== Classification ==
Class	Construction point	Hill size
Small hill	<45	<50
Medium hill	45–74	50–84
Normal hill	75–99	85–109
Large hill	100–169	110–184
Ski flying hill	≥170	≥185

== See also ==
- List of ski jumping hills
- Red Bull 400
- Côte Feuillée stadium
