= Construction point =

Reference point on a ski jumping hill

Overview of a ski jumping hill

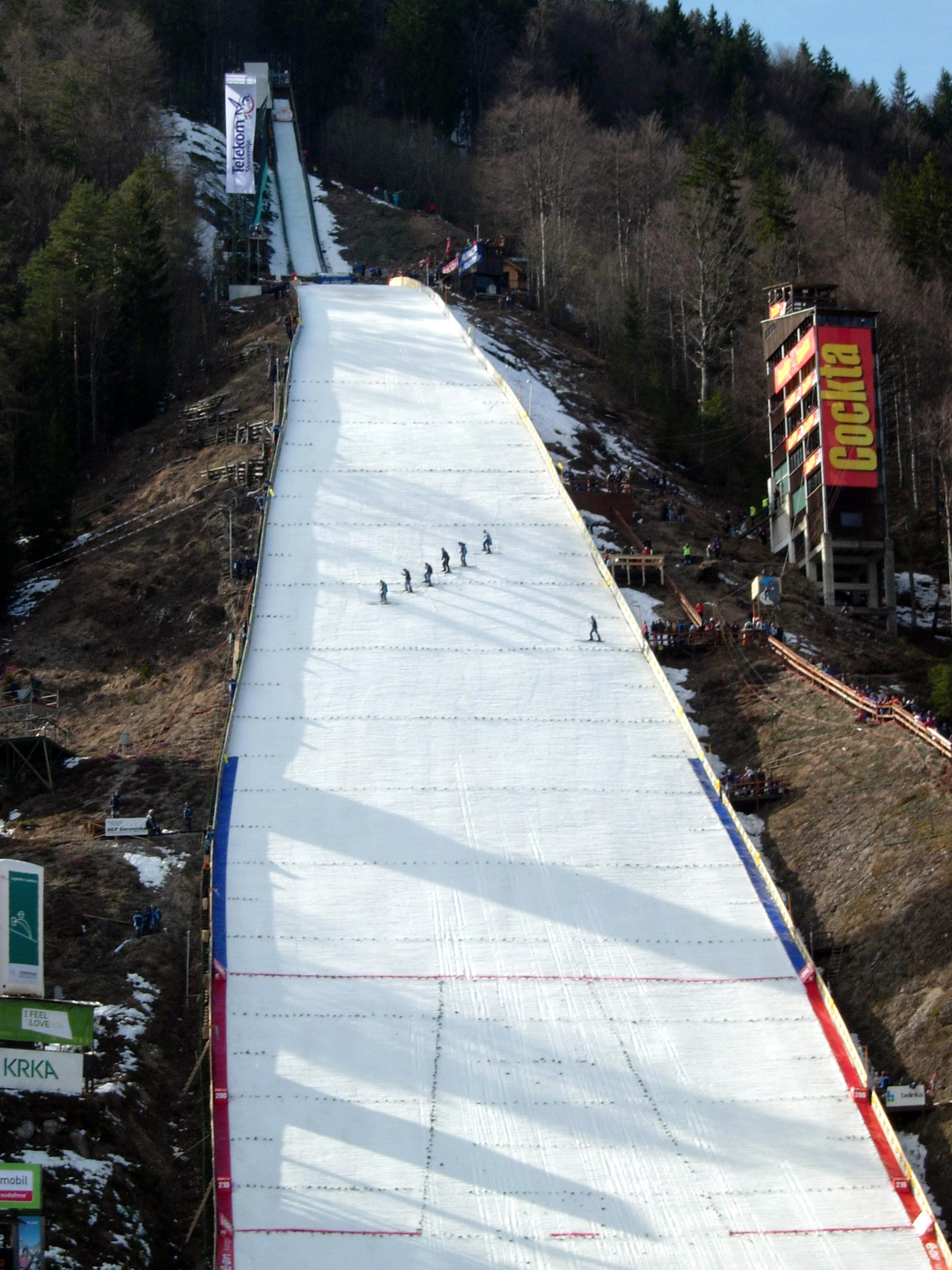
Letalnica Bratov Gorišek in Planica, Slovenia. The K-point is marked with a horizontal line at the top of the red vertical line, while the line at the bottom is the hill size point.

The construction point (German: Konstruktionspunkt), also known as the K-point or K-spot and formerly critical point, is a line across a ski jumping hill. It is used to calculate the number of points granted for a given jump. It is also called calculation point or calculation line.

== Classification ==
The distance between the construction point and the take-off table, measured in meters, was formerly used to classify the size of a ski jumping hill. Since mid-2004, the hills have been categorized by the hill size.

Class	Construction point	Hill size
Small hill	<45	<50
Medium hill	45–74	50–84
Normal hill	75–99	85–109
Large hill	100–169	110–184
Ski flying hill	≥170	≥185

Nearly all competitions in the FIS Ski Jumping World Cup use large hills with a construction point between 120 and 130. The largest is Mühlenkopfschanze in Germany. In addition, there is a bi-annual FIS Ski-Flying World Championship, which is held in one of the world's five ski flying hills: Vikersundbakken in Norway, Letalnica Bratov Gorišek in Slovenia, Čerťák in the Czech Republic, Heini Klopfer Ski Jump in Germany and Kulm in Austria. In the FIS Ski Jumping Continental Cup, and FIS Women's Ski Jumping Continental Cup, both normal and large hills are used. In the Winter Olympics, there is one competition on the normal hill, one on the large hill, and a team competition on the large hill.

== Scoring ==
Ski jumping competitions are based on a point system which combines points for length and style. The distance points plus the judges' marks result in the total score.

For hills up to large, the scoring system grants 60 points to jumps that reach the K-point. For ski flying hills, 120 points are granted for the K-point length. Distance points are calculated based on the hill length, added for each meter beyond the K-point, and subtracted for each point shorter than the K-point. A meter has more distance points in smaller hills. For example: On a K120 hill (Calculation point 120 m) the meter value is 1.8 points. So a 122 m jump would be worth 63.6 points, and an 118 m jump would be worth only 56.4 points.

Distance points
Calculation point	Distance points
20–24	4.8
25–29	4.4
30–34	4.0
35–39	3.6
40–49	3.2
50–59	2.8
60–69	2.4
70–79	2.2
80–99	2.0
100–169	1.8
>170	1.2
