= Hill size =

Measurement for ski jumping hills

Overview of a ski jumping hill

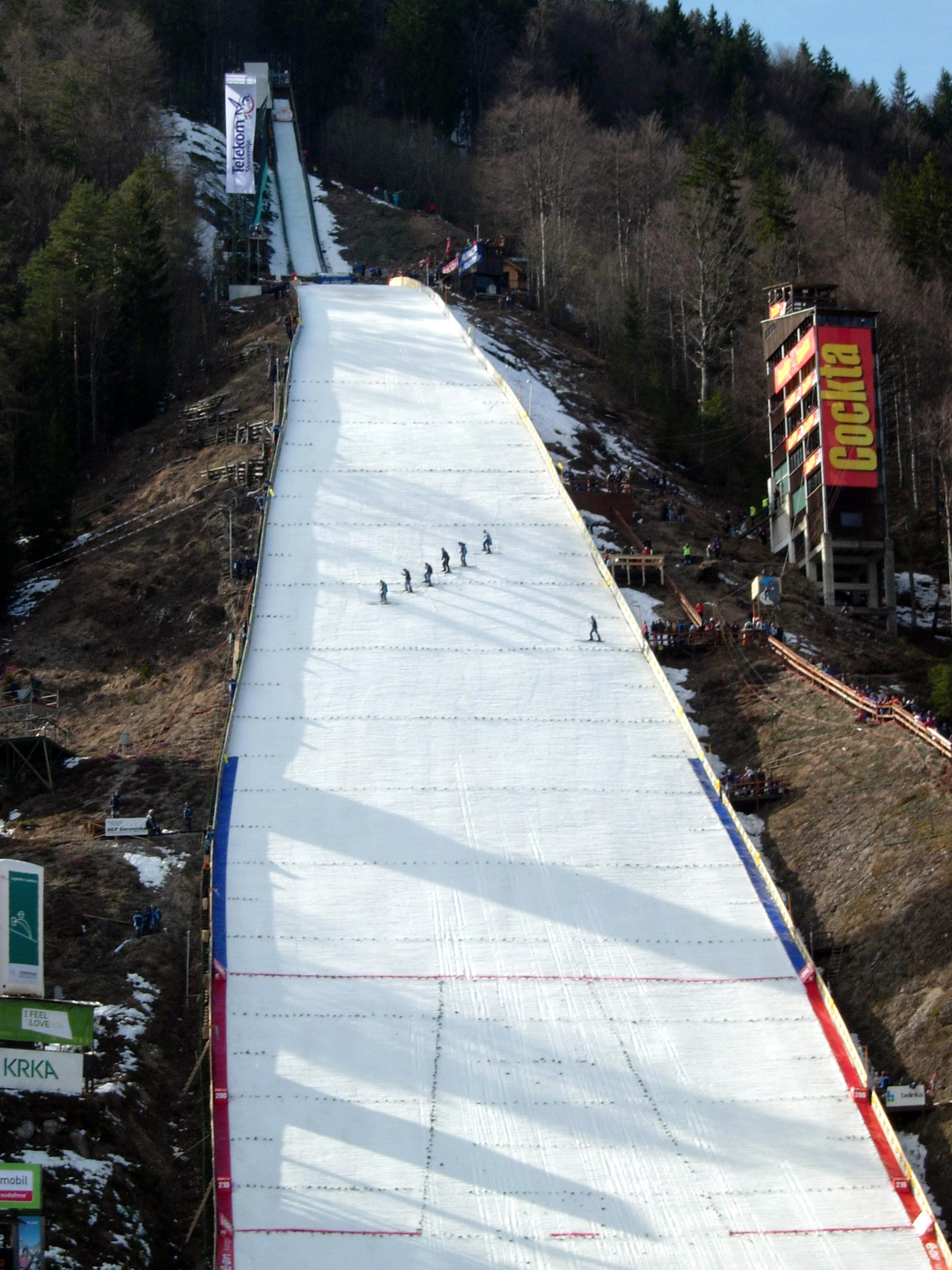
Letalnica Bratov Gorišek in Planica, Slovenia. The construction point is marked with a horizontal line at the top of the red vertical line, while the line at the bottom is the hill size point.

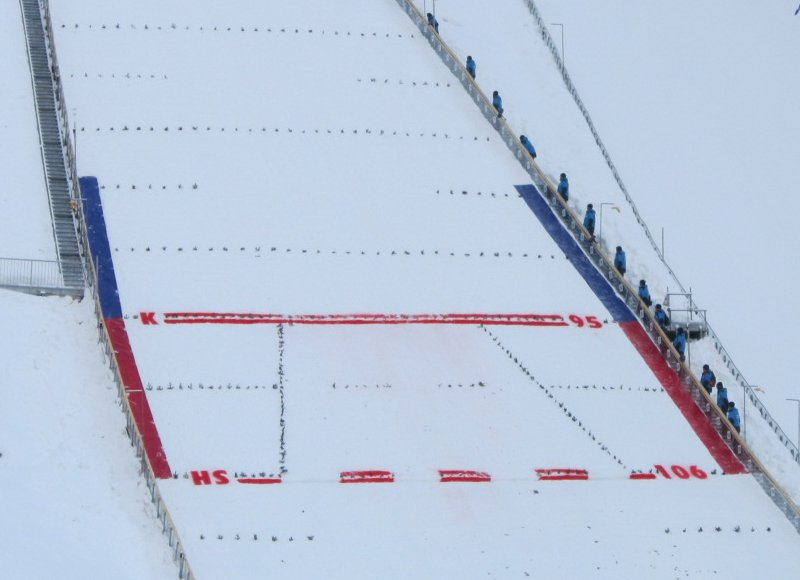
Hill size at 106 m

The hill size (HS) is the most important measurement for the size of a ski jumping hill. It is defined as the distance between the takeoff table and the end of the landing area, which is called hill size point. It is not measured as a straight line but on the surface of the hill. Since 2017, a typical slope inclination at hill size distance is 32° for normal hills, 31° for large hills, and 28° for ski flying hills.

The hill size was first defined in 2004 as a direct replacement for the previously used Jury distance. While the Jury distance for each hill was established annually prior to the season, the hill size of a hill is fixed. Since its inception, the hill size replaced the construction point (K-point, formerly known as the critical point) in the role of the primary measurement for the size of hills, which however remains the basis for issuing distance points.

The world's largest hills are Vikersundbakken in Vikersund, Norway and Letalnica Bratov Gorišek in Planica, Slovenia with hill size of 240 meters. The hills normally mark the hill size physically with a horizontal line across the hill.

== Classification ==
Ski jumping hills are classified by hill size as follows:

Class	Hill size	Respective construction point
Small hill	<50	<45
Medium hill	50–84	45–74
Normal hill	85–109	75–99
Large hill	≥110	≥100
Ski flying hill	≥185	≥170

Nearly all competitions in the FIS Ski Jumping World Cup use large hills and ski-flying hills, with the largest being Mühlenkopfschanze in Germany. In addition, there is a biennial FIS Ski-Flying World Championships, which is held in one of the world's five ski flying hills: Vikersundbakken in Norway, Letalnica Bratov Gorišek in Slovenia, Čerťák in the Czech Republic, Heini Klopfer Ski Jump in Germany and Kulm in Austria. These all have a hill size of at least 185. In the FIS Ski Jumping Continental Cup, and FIS Women's Ski Jumping Continental Cup, both normal and large hills are used. In the Winter Olympics, there is one competition in the normal hill, one in the large hill, and a team competition in the large hill.
