= FIS Sommer Ladies Tournee 2006 =

Annual women's ski-jumping competition

The FIS Sommer Ladies Tournee 2006 (German: 6. FIS Ladies Sommer Grand-Prix) was the 6th edition of the FIS Sommer Ladies Tournee, an international ski jumping tournament, that was held in the 2006–07 season on hills in Germany and Austria. The tournament began on 6 August 2006 with a competition on the hill in Klingenthal. Three days later, the second contest took place on the hill in Pöhla, with further events in Meinerzhagen. First, a team competition was held, followed by an individual one. On 15 August, the tournament concluded with an individual competition in Bischofshofen.

The first contest was won by Anette Sagen, and the next by Juliane Seyfarth. The third contest – the team event – was won by the United States team consisting of Avery Ardovino, Abby Hughes, Alissa Johnson, and Jessica Jerome. The penultimate and final events were again won by Anette Sagen, who became the overall winner of the 6th edition for the third time and also scored the most points in the FIS Sommer Ladies Tournee overall standings. Juliane Seyfarth finished 2nd in the general classification, and Jessica Jerome 3rd. A total of 64 female jumpers from 13 national teams participated in the series.

== Background ==
=== Context ===
Until 1998, the International Ski and Snowboard Federation did not organize any women's competitions. However, female jumpers occasionally participated as forerunners in men's events or competed but were not classified. In January 1998, unofficial junior world championships for women were held in Sankt Moritz, recognized as the first international women's event. In March of the same year, the first senior women's events under FIS auspices took place – two Continental Cup contests in Schönwald. In the following season, the FIS Ladies Winter Tournee was organized for the first time, the inaugural international women's series under FIS. Since summer 2001, a plastic hill tournament – the FIS Sommer Ladies Tournee – has also been held. In the 2005–06 season, the series was included in the women's Continental Cup calendar.

Of the jumpers participating in the 2006 FIS Sommer Ladies Tournee, 31 had competed in the previous – 5th – edition. Among those classified in the top 30 of the prior edition, absent were Germans Kristin Schmidt (12th) and Lisa Rexhäuser (16th), Slovenian Maja Vtič (5th), Italian Lisa Demetz (8th), Austrian Katrin Stefaner (21st), and Norwegian Stine Småkasin (27th). The winner of the 2005 FIS Sommer Ladies Tournee was Anette Sagen, ahead of Jessica Jerome and Line Jahr.

In previous editions, Daniela Iraschko won twice (2001 and 2002), as did Anette Sagen (2003 and 2005). Austrian Eva Ganster won once (2004) and finished 2nd twice (2001 and 2002). Japanese Ayumi Watase placed in the top three twice – 3rd in 2001 and 2003 – as did American Jessica Jerome – 3rd in 2002 and 2nd in 2005.

In the winter period, the FIS Ladies Grand Prix was organized under the same rules as the FSLT. Daniela Iraschko won four times (2000, 2001, 2002, 2005), Eva Ganster stood on the podium four times (2000, 2001, 2003, 2004). Anette Sagen finished 2nd in 2002, and first in 2003, 2004, and the final edition. In the last four editions, Lindsey Van also reached the podium – 3rd in 2003, and second in 2004, 2005, and 2006.

==== 2006–07 season ====
Before the tournament, in July 2006, four competitions were held in the USA and Canada as part of the 2006–07 women's Continental Cup. Juliane Seyfarth won all of them, with Daniela Iraschko finishing in the top three each time. Others on the podium included Anette Sagen (twice), Line Jahr, and Ulrike Gräßler. Seyfarth led the standings with a 100-point advantage over Iraschko and 184 over Sagen. The entire top of the series was entered for the 2006 FIS Sommer Ladies Tournee; the highest-ranked Continental Cup jumper not participating was 21st-placed Yurika Hirayama from Japan.

Continental Cup overall standings before FIS Sommer Ladies Tournee
Place	Athlete	Nation	Points	Deficit to leader
1.	Juliane Seyfarth	Germany	400	–
2.	Daniela Iraschko	Austria	300	100
3.	Anette Sagen	Norway	216	184
4.	Jessica Jerome	United States	172	228
5.	Alissa Johnson	United States	151	249
6.	Ulrike Gräßler	Germany	145	255
7.	Lindsey Van	United States	143	257
8.	Line Jahr	Norway	142	258
9.	Katie Willis	Canada	141	259
10.	Jacqueline Seifriedsberger	Austria	130	270
11.	Ayumi Watase	Japan	112	288
12.	Abby Hughes	United States	111	289
13.	Atsuko Tanaka	Canada	74	326
14.	Nata De Leeuw	Canada	71	329
15.	Tanja Drage	Austria	67	333
16.	Vladěna Pustková	Czech Republic	64	336
17.	Brenna Ellis	United States	63	337
18.	Elena Runggaldier	Italy	56	344
19.	Roberta D'Agostina	Italy	50	350
20.	Zoya Lynch	Canada	43	357
21.	Yurika Hirayama	Japan	35	365
22.	Misaki Shigeno	Japan	31	369
23.	Avery Ardovino	United States	29	371
24.	Karla Keck	United States	19	381
25.	Jaklyn Devos	Canada	16	384
26.	Karin Friberg	United States	14	386
27.	Elisabeth Andersson	United States	11	389
28.	Brittany Rhoads	United States	9	391

== Rules ==
The rules for the FIS Sommer Ladies Tournee are the same as those for World Cup or Continental Cup events. Points from the competitions were counted toward the FIS Sommer Ladies Tournee overall classification.

Jumps were scored in the same way as in World Cup or Continental Cup events. Reaching the K-point earned 60 points. Each additional meter added 2 points, while each meter short subtracted 2 points. Additionally, jump style and landing were judged by five FIS-appointed judges, each able to award up to 20 points. The two extreme scores (highest and lowest) were discarded from the final score.

== Hills ==
Hill name	Location	K-point	Hill size	Hill record		
Vogtlandschanze	(Germany) Klingenthal	K-80	85.0 m	86.0 m	(Germany) Marcus Schneider (France) Maxime Laheurte (Slovenia) Dejan Plevnik (Germany) Eric Frenzel	23.01.1998; 18.01.2004; 18.01.2004; 18.01.2004
Pöhlbachschanze	(Germany) Pöhla	K-60	65.0 m	68.5 m	(Germany) Dirk Else	2001
Meinhardus-Schanze	(Germany) Meinerzhagen	K-62	68.0 m	68.5 m	(Austria) Daniela Iraschko	15.08.2004
Laideregg-Schanze	(Austria) Bischofshofen	K-65	78.0 m	76.5 m	(Austria) Martin Machreich	12.02.2006

== Jury ==
The main directors of the competitions in the FIS Sommer Ladies Tournee were: Andreas Hille for the first event, Günter Beck for the second, Manfred Bachmann for the third and fourth, and Gerhard Krab for the last. The technical delegate for the first four competitions in Klingenthal, Pöhla, and Meinerzhagen was Dalibor Motejlek from the Czech Republic, with Edgar Ganster as his assistant. For the final competition at Laideregg-Schanze, the technical delegate was Uwe Mühln from Germany, with Edgar Ganster again assisting.

Judge	Country	Position at the judging tower				
Judge	Country	Klingenthal	Pöhla	Meinerzhagen	Meinerzhagen	Bischofshofen
Michal Bartoš	Czech Republic	D	C	C	C	–
Claudia Denifl	Austria	–	–	–	–	D
Reinhard Distlmeier	Germany	C	–	–	–	–
Günther Frettlöh	Germany	–	–	A	A	–
Michael Herzig	Germany	E	–	–	–	–
Bernd Heß	Germany	–	A	–	–	–
Gerhardt Hoyer	Germany	–	B	–	–	–
Mirko Hünefeld	Germany	–	E	–	–	–
Stephan Klein	Germany	–	–	E	E	–
Bernd Krauß	Germany	A	–	–	–	–
Robert Krautgartner	Austria	–	–	–	–	E
Wolfgang Patzina	Germany	–	–	D	D	–
Günter Riedel	Germany	–	D	–	–	–
Manfred Schnetzer	Austria	–	–	–	–	B
Bernhard Selbach	Germany	–	–	B	B	–
Peter Stattmann	Austria	–	–	–	–	A
Jürgen Thomas	Germany	B	–	–	–	–
Helmut Wegscheider	Germany	–	–	–	–	C

== Podiums ==
=== Overall classification podium ===
Athlete	(Germany) Klingenthal			(Germany) Pöhla			(Germany) Meinerzhagen			(Austria) Bischofshofen			Total score	Deficit
Athlete	Jump 1	Jump 2	Score	Jump 1	Jump 2	Score	Jump 1	Jump 2	Score	Jump 1	Jump 2	Score	Total score	Deficit
(Norway) Anette Sagen	79.5 m	81.5 m	230.0	60.5 m	63.0 m	226.4	67.0 m	66.5 m	250.8	73.0 m	71.5 m	267.8	975.0	–
(Germany) Juliane Seyfarth	81.0 m	81.0 m	227.5	61.0 m	62.0 m	234.7	67.0 m	67.0 m	249.5	70.0 m	72.0 m	260.8	972.5	2.5
(United States) Jessica Jerome	79.0 m	79.5 m	225.0	60.0 m	61.5 m	230.1	63.0 m	66.5 m	213.7	70.0 m	68.5 m	250.9	919.7	55.3

== Competition progress ==
=== Klingenthal ===
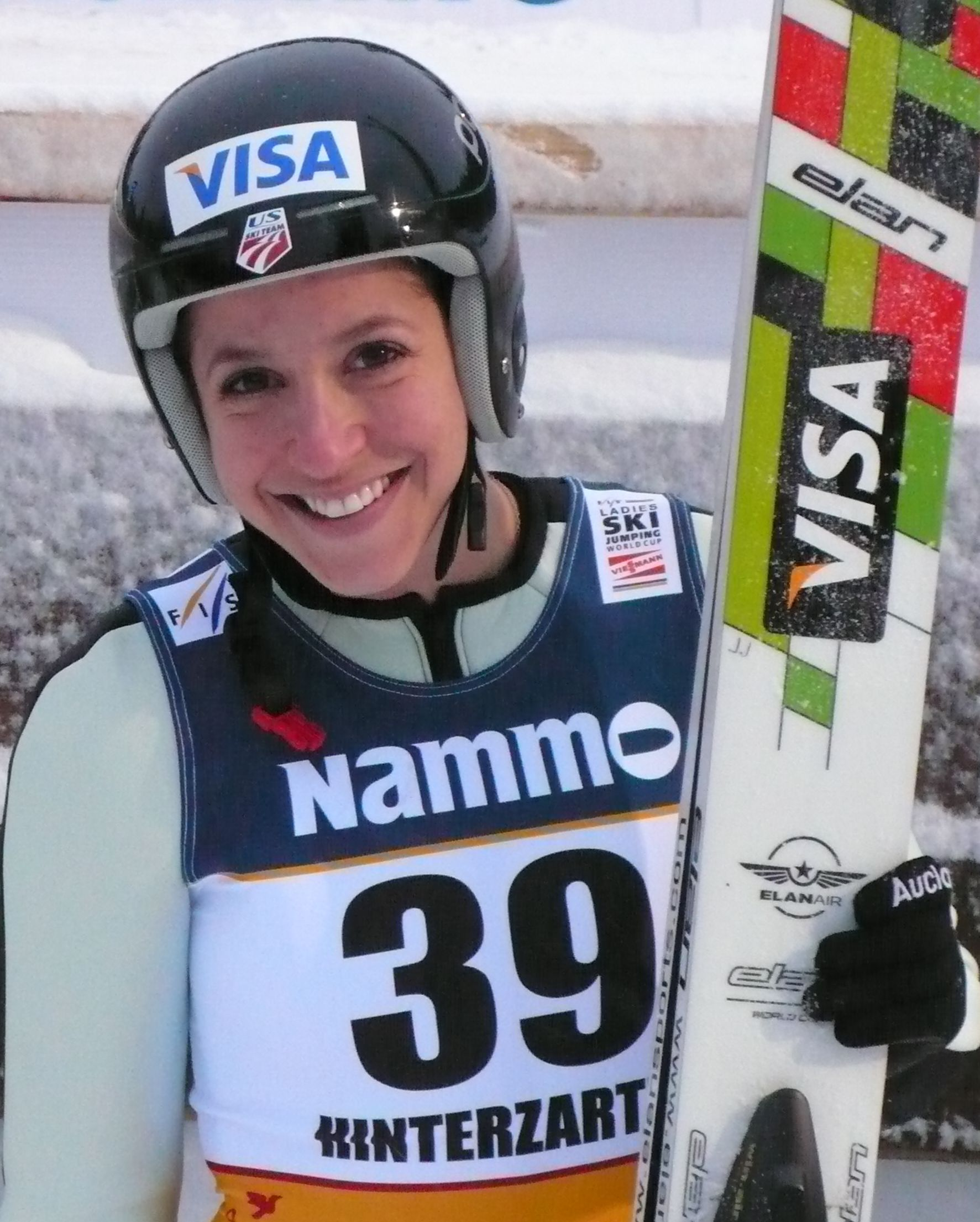
Jessica Jerome – winner of the team competition in Meinerzhagen, 3rd in the individual competitions in Klingenthal and Pöhla, and 3rd in the overall classification

The first competition of the 2006 FIS Sommer Ladies Tournee was held on the normal-sized hill in Klingenthal. 49 jumpers participated. In the first round, three jumpers reached at least the K-point, set at 80 meters. The longest jump was by the last starter, Juliane Seyfarth (81.0 m). Half a meter shorter, with slightly lower style points than the German, were Lindsey Van and Elena Runggaldier. The third-best distance was achieved by Anette Sagen and Katie Willis (79.5 m). Seyfarth led after the first round, followed by Van and Runggaldier.

In the final round, four jumpers exceeded the K-point. The longest jump in the second round was by Abby Hughes (83.5 m), though with lower style points. 14th after the first round, Japan's Izumi Yamada moved up to 5th overall with an 81-meter jump, earning the second-best score of the final round. She was overtaken by Jessica Jerome (79.5 m), who jumped 5th from the end. However, Norway's Anette Sagen (81.5 m), with the best score of the second round, took the lead and held it to win the competition. Seyfarth, with a similar distance but slightly lower style points, finished 2nd, 2.5 points behind Sagen. Jessica Jerome took 3rd.

Two jumpers fell: Switzerland's Sabrina Windmüller in the first round and Canada's Nata De Leeuw in the second. The following jumpers withdrew: Germans Jeanine Drechsel and Laila Jung, Switzerland's Malika Schüpbach, and Norway's Silje Sprakehaug. Jumpers in both rounds started from the 13th gate. It rained during the competition, with air temperatures of 12.4 °C in the first round and 13.2 °C in the second.

==== Results (6 August 2006) ====
Place	Jumper	Country					
Place	Jumper	Country	Round 1		Round 2		Total score
Place	Jumper	Country	Jump	Score	Jump	Score	Total score
1.	Anette Sagen	Norway	79.5	113.0	81.5	117.0	230.0
2.	Juliane Seyfarth	Germany	81.0	116.0	81.0	111.5	227.5
3.	Jessica Jerome	United States	79.0	111.5	79.5	113.5	225.0
4.	Lindsey Van	United States	80.5	114.5	75.5	104.0	218.5
5.	Izumi Yamada	Japan	73.5	97.0	81.0	115.5	212.5
6.	Katie Willis	Canada	79.5	111.0	74.0	100.0	211.0
7.	Elena Runggaldier	Italy	80.5	113.5	72.0	95.5	209.0
8.	Abby Hughes	United States	72.0	96.0	83.5	111.0	207.0
9.	Bigna Windmüller	Switzerland	75.5	103.5	75.0	102.5	206.0
10.	Daniela Iraschko	Austria	74.0	102.0	73.0	99.5	201.5
11.	Jacqueline Seifriedsberger	Austria	72.5	97.5	73.5	99.5	197.0
12.	Alissa Johnson	United States	73.0	98.0	73.5	98.5	196.5
12.	Line Jahr	Norway	75.0	101.5	72.0	95.0	196.5
14.	Ayumi Watase	Japan	72.5	97.0	73.5	98.5	195.5
15.	Ulrike Gräßler	Germany	75.0	101.5	71.0	93.0	194.5
16.	Gyda Enger	Norway	70.0	90.5	75.5	103.5	194.0
17.	Rieko Kanai	Japan	69.0	88.0	73.5	98.5	186.5
18.	Atsuko Tanaka	Canada	71.0	93.5	70.5	92.0	185.5
19.	Melanie Faißt	Germany	73.5	97.5	68.5	86.5	184.0
19.	Yoshiko Yoshiizumi	Japan	69.5	90.0	71.5	94.0	184.0
21.	Brenna Ellis	United States	70.5	92.0	67.5	84.5	176.5
22.	Vladěna Pustková	Czech Republic	68.5	87.5	69.5	88.5	176.0
23.	Tanja Drage	Austria	69.0	88.0	68.5	86.5	174.5
24.	Anna Häfele	Germany	71.5	93.5	63.0	74.5	168.0
25.	Svenja Würth	Germany	66.5	79.5	68.0	82.5	162.0
26.	Roberta D'Agostina	Italy	63.5	76.5	67.0	84.0	160.5
27.	Katja Požun	Slovenia	64.0	76.5	64.5	78.5	155.0
28.	Eva Logar	Slovenia	64.5	78.5	59.5	63.5	142.0
29.	Nata De Leeuw	Canada	67.0	82.5	67.5	55.5	138.0
30.	Magdalena Schnurr	Germany	64.5	78.5	55.0	53.5	132.0
31.	Carina Vogt	Germany	63.5	75.5	–	–	75.5
32.	Salome Fuchs	Switzerland	63.5	75.0	–	–	75.0
33.	Verena Pock	Austria	63.0	74.5	–	–	74.5
34.	Zoya Lynch	Canada	63.5	73.5	–	–	73.5
35.	Carina Ziller	Germany	60.0	68.0	–	–	68.0
35.	Nicole Hauer	Germany	60.0	68.0	–	–	68.0
37.	Mari Backe	Norway	58.5	65.0	–	–	65.0
38.	Franziska Moser	Germany	58.5	64.5	–	–	64.5
39.	Anja Tepeš	Slovenia	57.0	62.0	–	–	62.0
40.	Valentine Prucker	Italy	56.5	61.0	–	–	61.0
40.	Michaela Doleželová	Czech Republic	58.0	61.0	–	–	61.0
42.	Barbara Stuffer	Italy	56.0	59.5	–	–	59.5
43.	Stefanie Krieg	Germany	56.0	55.5	–	–	55.5
44.	Live Frisak	Norway	56.0	55.0	–	–	55.0
45.	Esther Steindl	Austria	54.5	53.0	–	–	53.0
46.	Monika Pogladič	Slovenia	53.5	50.5	–	–	50.5
47.	Sabrina Windmüller	Switzerland	60.0	41.5	–	–	41.5
48.	Monika Planinc	Slovenia	49.0	38.5	–	–	38.5
49.	Elina Knutsson	Sweden	47.0	34.5	–	–	34.5

=== Pöhla ===
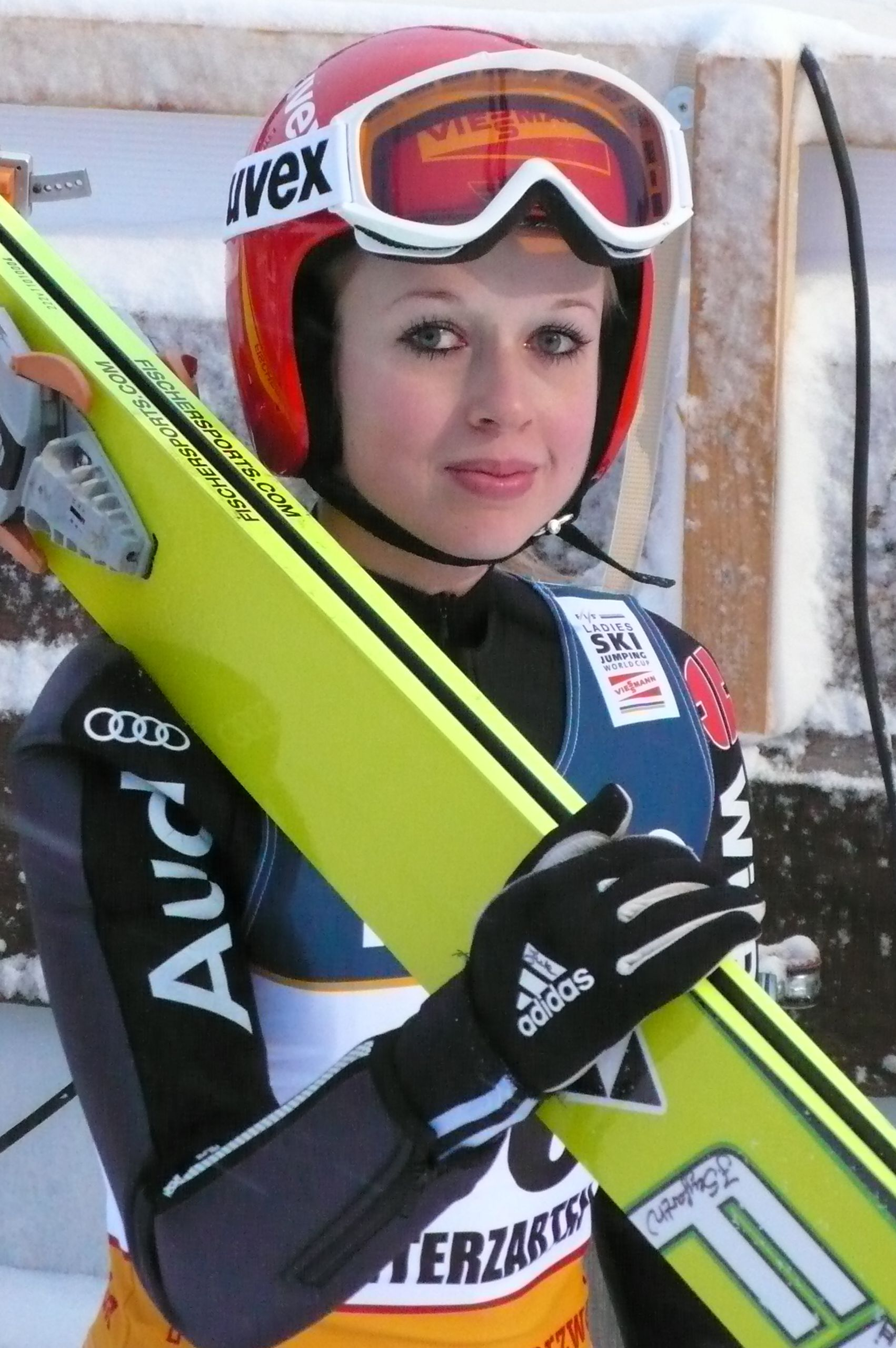
Juliane Seyfarth – winner of the second individual competition of the 2006 FIS Sommer Ladies Tournee in Pöhla, second in the individual and team competitions in Klingenthal, Meinerzhagen, and Bischofshofen, and second in the overall FSLT 2006 classification

Three days after the opening competition of the 2006 FIS Sommer Ladies Tournee in Klingenthal, the second individual event took place at the Pöhlbachschanze (K-60). In the first round, seven jumpers reached or exceeded the K-point. Germany's Ulrike Gräßler jumped the farthest at 62 meters, 6.5 meters short of the hill record. Juliane Seyfarth achieved the second-best distance (61.0 m). Half a meter shorter, Anette Sagen landed with lower style points, placing 8th after the first round. Higher scores than Sagen were earned by Jacqueline Seifriedsberger (114.0 pts), Jessica Jerome (112.5 pts), Katie Willis (112.5 pts), Lindsey Van (111.3 pts), and Alissa Johnson (110.3 pts). Gräßler led after the first round, 0.4 points ahead of Seyfarth, with Seifriedsberger 3rd, 1.5 points ahead of Jerome.

In the final round, Ulrike Gräßler and Anette Sagen (63.0 m) achieved the best distance, the only two among 11 jumpers to reach or exceed the K-point. Gräßler, with lower style points than her closest rivals, lost the lead. Seyfarth, jumping second-to-last, landed a meter shorter in both rounds but earned higher style points, overtaking Gräßler. Alissa Johnson, with the second-best distance in the final round, climbed three spots in the standings. Jessica Jerome (61.5 m), with the second-best score in the final round and style points similar to Seyfarth's, secured 3rd place. Seyfarth won with a 2.7-point lead over Gräßler and 4.6 over Jerome.

As in Klingenthal, Switzerland's Sabrina Windmüller fell during her jump. Norway's Gyda Enger withdrew from the competition. Jumpers started from the 9th gate in the first round and the 10th in the final round. The weather was partly cloudy, with temperatures of 14.0 °C in the first round and 13.5 °C in the second.

==== Results (9 August 2006) ====
Place	Jumper	Country					
Place	Jumper	Country	Round 1		Round 2		Total score
Place	Jumper	Country	Jump	Score	Jump	Score	Total score
1.	Juliane Seyfarth	Germany	61.0	115.9	62.0	118.8	234.7
2.	Ulrike Gräßler	Germany	62.0	116.3	63.0	115.7	232.0
3.	Jessica Jerome	United States	60.0	112.5	61.5	117.6	230.1
4.	Alissa Johnson	United States	59.5	110.3	62.0	117.3	227.6
5.	Lindsey Van	United States	59.5	111.3	61.5	116.1	227.4
5.	Katie Willis	Canada	60.0	112.5	61.0	114.9	227.4
7.	Anette Sagen	Norway	60.5	109.7	63.0	116.7	226.4
8.	Line Jahr	Norway	58.5	108.9	61.0	116.4	225.3
9.	Abby Hughes	United States	59.0	109.6	61.0	113.4	223.0
10.	Jacqueline Seifriedsberger	Austria	60.0	114.0	58.0	108.2	222.2
11.	Bigna Windmüller	Switzerland	60.0	107.0	60.0	111.5	218.5
12.	Ayumi Watase	Japan	58.0	107.7	58.0	106.7	214.4
13.	Avery Ardovino	United States	58.5	107.4	57.5	105.0	212.4
14.	Izumi Yamada	Japan	55.5	99.2	60.5	112.2	211.4
15.	Yoshiko Yoshiizumi	Japan	56.5	103.1	57.5	105.0	208.1
16.	Anna Häfele	Germany	56.0	101.4	58.0	106.2	207.6
17.	Brenna Ellis	United States	56.0	99.9	58.5	106.9	206.8
18.	Atsuko Tanaka	Canada	55.5	99.7	57.0	103.8	203.5
19.	Vladěna Pustková	Czech Republic	55.5	98.7	57.5	104.5	203.2
20.	Eva Logar	Slovenia	55.5	99.7	56.5	102.1	201.8
21.	Melanie Faißt	Germany	56.0	98.4	57.0	101.8	200.2
22.	Rieko Kanai	Japan	56.0	100.4	55.5	99.7	200.1
23.	Verena Pock	Austria	56.0	100.9	54.5	96.3	197.2
24.	Roberta D'Agostina	Italy	53.5	94.4	56.5	102.1	196.5
25.	Malika Schüpbach	Switzerland	55.5	97.2	56.0	98.4	195.6
26.	Katja Požun	Slovenia	54.0	95.1	56.0	99.9	195.0
27.	Tanja Drage	Austria	55.0	97.5	54.5	96.3	193.8
28.	Nicole Hauer	Germany	54.0	95.6	55.0	98.0	193.6
29.	Nata De Leeuw	Canada	54.5	96.8	53.0	91.2	188.0
30.	Elena Runggaldier	Italy	53.5	94.4	53.0	93.2	187.6
31.	Salome Fuchs	Switzerland	54.5	96.8	49.0	71.6	168.4
32.	Anja Tepeš	Slovenia	53.5	93.9	–	–	93.9
33.	Stefanie Krieg	Germany	52.5	92.0	–	–	92.0
34.	Franziska Moser	Germany	54.0	90.6	–	–	90.6
35.	Zoya Lynch	Canada	53.0	90.2	–	–	90.2
36.	Evelyn Insam	Italy	52.0	89.3	–	–	89.3
37.	Karin Friberg	United States	52.5	88.5	–	–	88.5
38.	Elisabeth Anderson	United States	51.0	86.9	–	–	86.9
39.	Valentine Prucker	Italy	50.0	84.5	–	–	84.5
40.	Barbara Stuffer	Italy	49.5	82.3	–	–	82.3
41.	Live Frisak	Norway	50.5	82.2	–	–	82.2
42.	Mari Backe	Norway	49.0	81.6	–	–	81.6
43.	Steffi Reischl	Germany	49.5	81.3	–	–	81.3
44.	Monika Pogladič	Slovenia	48.5	75.4	–	–	75.4
45.	Esther Steindl	Austria	48.0	74.7	–	–	74.7
46.	Michaela Doleželová	Czech Republic	47.5	73.0	–	–	73.0
47.	Monika Planinc	Slovenia	44.5	67.3	–	–	67.3
48.	Elina Knutsson	Sweden	42.0	57.8	–	–	57.8
49.	Joanna Gawron	Poland	42.0	57.3	–	–	57.3
50.	Simona Senoner	Italy	36.5	45.1	–	–	45.1
51.	Nadine Kostner	Italy	36.0	42.9	–	–	42.9
52.	Sabrina Windmüller	Switzerland	44.0	39.6	–	–	39.6
53.	Gabriela Buńda	Poland	34.5	38.3	–	–	38.3

=== Meinerzhagen ===
==== First competition (team) ====
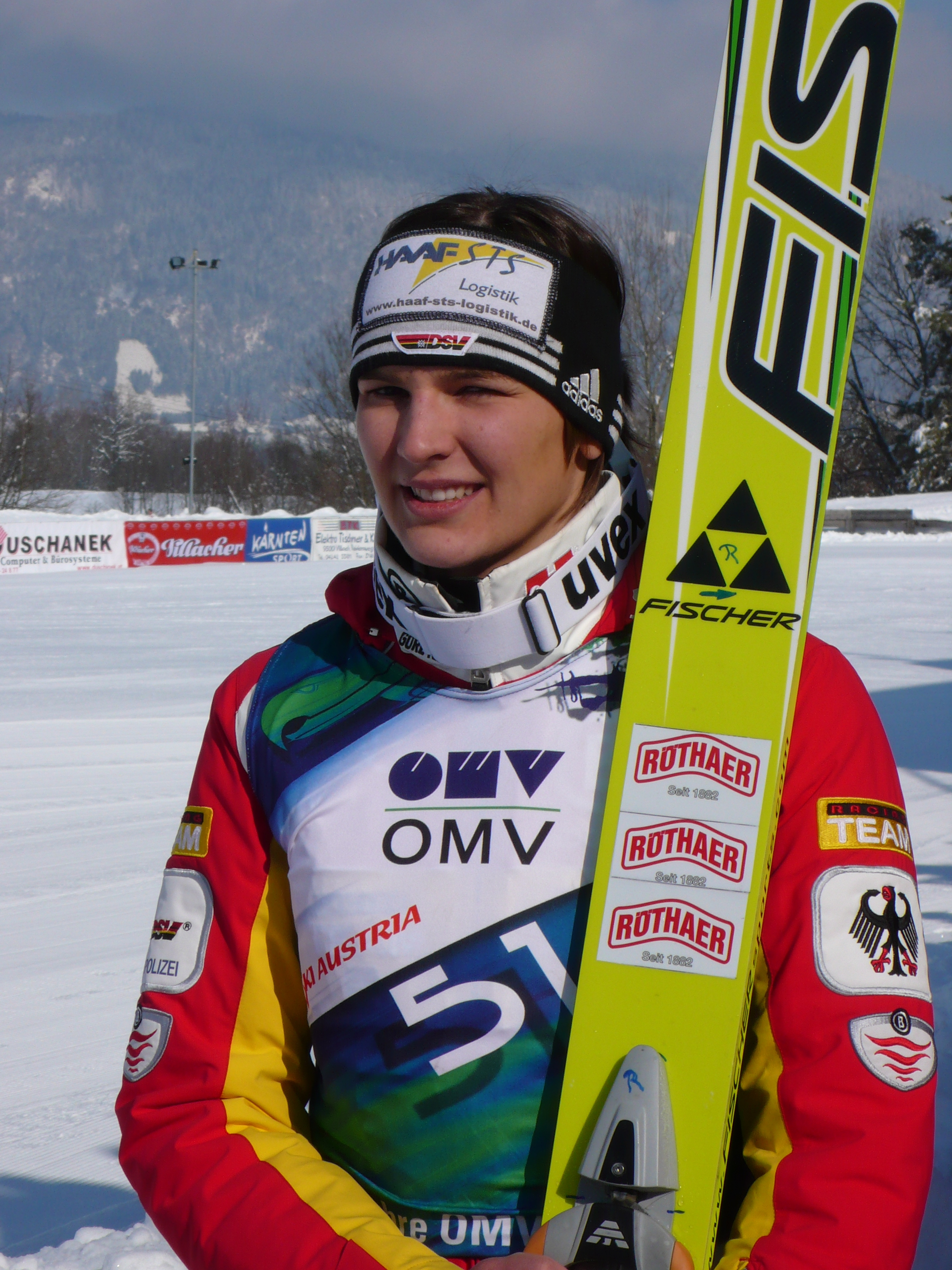
Ulrike Gräßler – 2nd in the individual competition in Pöhla and team competition in Meinerzhagen, 3rd in the individual competition in Bischofshofen, and 4th in the overall tournament classification

The third event of the 6th edition of the FIS Sommer Ladies Tournee was the team competition held on the medium-sized hill in Meinerzhagen on 11 August. 15 teams competed, including 12 national teams and three mixed teams. After the first round, Switzerland led. The longest jumps were by Izumi Yamada and Salome Fuchs, both at 62.5 meters, with Fuchs earning higher style points. Japan and the United States followed closely behind. In the second group, Abby Hughes from the US jumped the farthest at 63.5 meters, putting the US in the lead with a 3.9-point advantage over Japan. In the third group, Alissa Johnson from the US jumped one meter shorter than Hughes. In the final group of the first round, Anette Sagen jumped 66.0 meters, keeping Norway in 4th but closing the gap to Japan. Juliane Seyfarth jumped 3.5 meters shorter, moving Germany to second after a weaker 56.0-meter jump by Japan's Yoshiko Yoshiizumi. The US led after the first round, 26.6 points ahead of Germany I and 32.4 ahead of Japan.

In the fifth group, Elena Runggaldier jumped 64.5 meters, the longest of the round, with Izumi Yamada landing half a meter shorter, allowing Japan to reclaim 2nd place, five points ahead of Germany. In the 6th group, Abby Hughes jumped 67.0 meters, the longest of the round. Japan's Rieko Kanai (60.5 m) fell, enabling Norway to move to 3rd and Germany to regain 2nd after a 63.5-meter jump by Melanie Faißt. In the seventh group, Ulrike Gräßler from Germany jumped the farthest. After this round, the US led, followed by Germany (34.8 points behind) and Norway (25.1 points behind Germany). Japan was 1.1 points behind Norway. In the final eighth group, Anette Sagen again jumped farthest at 64.5 meters, topping the unofficial individual ranking by 7.5 points over Abby Hughes. Japan's Yoshiko Yoshiizumi jumped 4.5 meters shorter than Sagen, securing Norway's 3rd place and Japan's 4th. The US won with a 45.2-point lead over Germany and 66.0 over Norway.

Jumpers used the 8th gate in the first round, the 9th in the fifth and sixth groups, the 8th again in the seventh, and the 7th in the final round.

===== Results (11 August 2006) =====
Place	Team	Athlete	Round 1		Round 2		Team score
Place	Team	Athlete	Jump	Score	Jump	Score	Team score
1.	United States I	Avery Ardovino	62.0	108.5	62.0	111.5	916.2
1.	United States I	Abby Hughes	63.5	112.1	67.0	122.5	916.2
1.	United States I	Alissa Johnson	62.5	113.2	63.0	114.9	916.2
1.	United States I	Jessica Jerome	64.0	118.8	62.5	114.7	916.2
2.	Germany I	Anna Häfele	58.5	102.1	59.5	103.5	871.0
2.	Germany I	Melanie Faißt	61.0	105.6	63.5	112.6	871.0
2.	Germany I	Ulrike Gräßler	61.0	105.1	65.0	114.7	871.0
2.	Germany I	Juliane Seyfarth	62.5	113.2	62.5	114.2	871.0
3.	Norway	Gyda Enger	57.5	98.7	60.5	104.4	850.2
3.	Norway	Mari Backe	55.5	92.9	57.0	97.0	850.2
3.	Norway	Line Jahr	59.0	103.8	61.5	111.3	850.2
3.	Norway	Anette Sagen	66.0	123.6	64.5	118.5	850.2
4.	Japan	Izumi Yamada	62.5	111.7	64.0	114.3	835.8
4.	Japan	Rieko Kanai	59.5	105.0	60.5	83.4	835.8
4.	Japan	Ayumi Watase	60.5	107.9	62.5	112.7	835.8
4.	Japan	Yoshiko Yoshiizumi	56.0	95.6	60.0	105.2	835.8
5.	Canada	Zoya Lynch	53.0	82.9	55.0	86.7	803.2
5.	Canada	Nata De Leeuw	60.5	107.9	61.5	109.3	803.2
5.	Canada	Atsuko Tanaka	56.0	95.6	60.0	106.2	803.2
5.	Canada	Katie Willis	60.0	105.7	60.5	108.9	803.2
6.	United States II	Elisabeth Anderson	53.5	87.6	54.5	89.5	797.1
6.	United States II	Karin Friberg	55.5	93.4	60.0	104.7	797.1
6.	United States II	Brenna Ellis	57.5	99.7	58.5	101.6	797.1
6.	United States II	Lindsey Van	61.5	110.3	61.5	110.3	797.1
7.	Austria	Esther Steindl	53.5	83.1	53.5	86.6	795.2
7.	Austria	Verena Pock	58.0	100.4	62.5	113.7	795.2
7.	Austria	Tanja Drage	57.0	97.5	58.5	101.6	795.2
7.	Austria	Jacqueline Seifriedsberger	61.0	111.6	57.5	100.7	795.2
8.	Italy	Elena Runggaldier	62.0	108.0	64.5	118.5	795.1
8.	Italy	Evelyn Insam	58.5	102.1	61.5	109.8	795.1
8.	Italy	Valentine Prucker	50.0	77.7	52.5	84.2	795.1
8.	Italy	Roberta D'Agostina	58.0	101.9	55.5	92.9	795.1
9.	Switzerland	Salome Fuchs	62.5	113.2	60.0	106.2	778.5
9.	Switzerland	Sabrina Windmüller	54.5	63.5	54.5	82.0	778.5
9.	Switzerland	Malika Schüpbach	55.5	89.4	60.0	101.7	778.5
9.	Switzerland	Bigna Windmüller	63.5	113.6	60.5	108.9	778.5
10.	Slovenia	Eva Logar	59.5	100.5	54.0	85.8	765.2
10.	Slovenia	Anja Tepeš	58.0	99.9	60.0	106.2	765.2
10.	Slovenia	Monika Pogladič	52.0	82.0	57.5	98.7	765.2
10.	Slovenia	Katja Požun	56.5	95.8	56.5	96.3	765.2
11.	Germany II	Svenja Würth	57.0	94.0	56.5	92.3	742.6
11.	Germany II	Carina Ziller	57.5	97.2	60.5	106.4	742.6
11.	Germany II	Lea Wallewein	52.0	79.5	59.5	101.5	742.6
11.	Germany II	Stefanie Krieg	53.5	89.1	51.0	82.6	742.6
12.	Germany III	Carina Vogt	56.0	93.6	61.0	103.1	707.3
12.	Germany III	Magdalena Schnurr	55.5	93.9	62.0	112.0	707.3
12.	Germany III	Franziska Moser	55.5	88.4	55.0	87.2	707.3
12.	Germany III	Jasmin Hentschel	47.0	70.5	43.5	58.6	707.3
13.	Mixed team (Slovenia, Norway, Netherlands)	Monika Planinc	47.0	66.0	46.0	66.1	613.4
13.	Mixed team (Slovenia, Norway, Netherlands)	Live Frisak	54.5	87.0	57.5	94.7	613.4
13.	Mixed team (Slovenia, Norway, Netherlands)	Wendy Vuik	47.5	71.7	48.5	72.6	613.4
13.	Mixed team (Slovenia, Norway, Netherlands)	Silje Sprakehaug	47.5	68.2	53.5	87.1	613.4
14.	Mixed team (Poland, Czech Republic)	Gabriela Buńda	36.0	36.6	37.0	39.0	561.2
14.	Mixed team (Poland, Czech Republic)	Joanna Gawron	46.5	64.3	47.0	66.0	561.2
14.	Mixed team (Poland, Czech Republic)	Michaela Doleželová	52.5	80.7	51.0	77.1	561.2
14.	Mixed team (Poland, Czech Republic)	Vladěna Pustková	60.0	104.2	56.5	93.3	561.2
15.	Mixed team (Italy, Sweden)	Simona Senoner	38.5	44.6	38.5	42.9	486.8
15.	Mixed team (Italy, Sweden)	Nadine Kostner	38.5	44.1	39.5	51.0	486.8
15.	Mixed team (Italy, Sweden)	Elina Knutsson	46.0	62.6	47.5	67.2	486.8
15.	Mixed team (Italy, Sweden)	Barbara Stuffer	54.0	87.3	53.5	87.1	486.8

=== Second competition (individual) ===
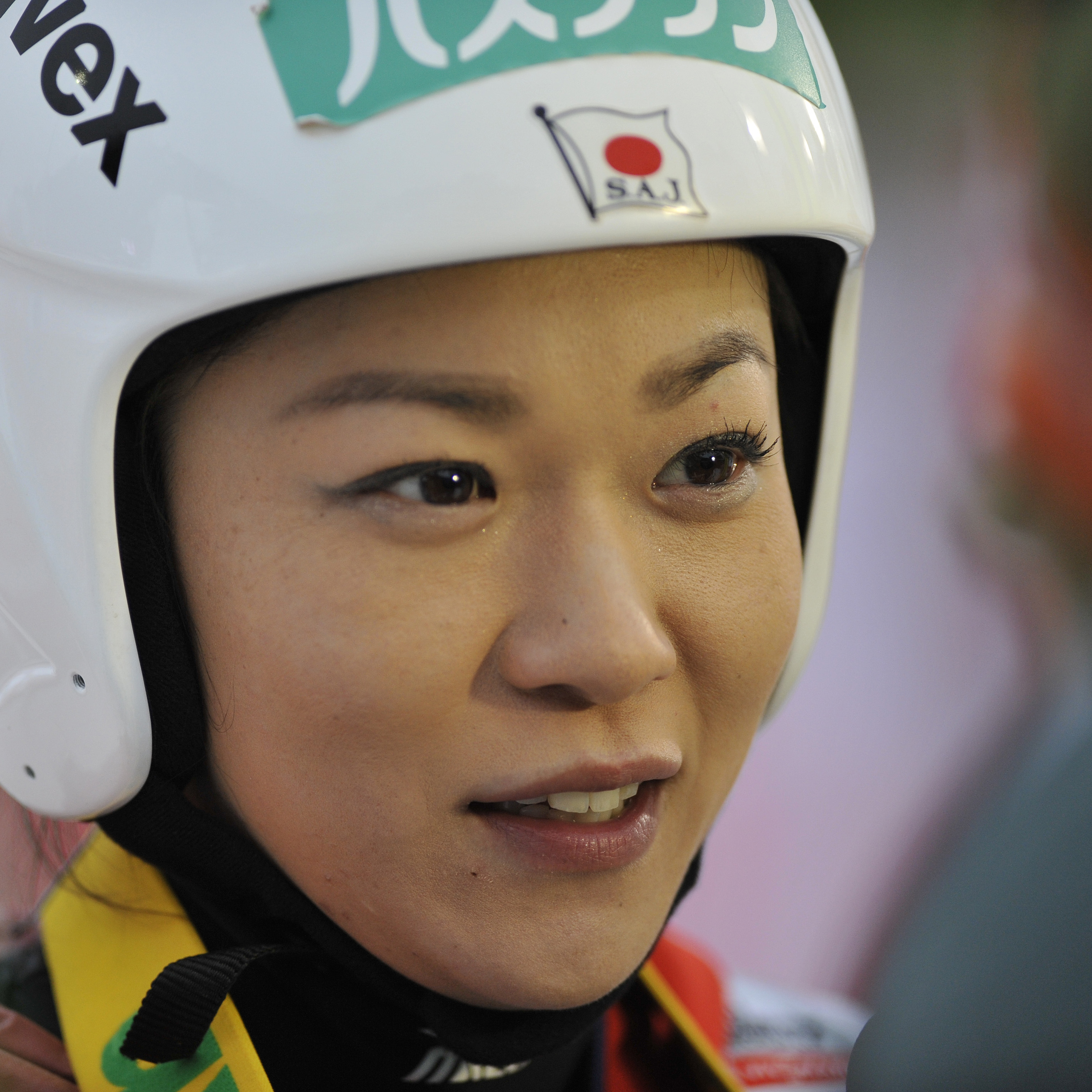
Ayumi Watase – 3rd in the penultimate individual competition and 7th in the overall classification

The day after the team competition, the third individual event of the 2006 FIS Sommer Ladies Tournee was held on Meinhardus-Schanze (K-62) in Meinerzhagen. 59 jumpers competed. In the first round, 10 jumpers reached or exceeded the K-point. These were Norway's Anette Sagen (67.0 m) and Line Jahr (62.0 m), Germany's Juliane Seyfarth (67.0 m) and Ulrike Gräßler (64.5 m), the US' Alissa Johnson (63.5 m) and Jessica Jerome (63.0 m), Switzerland's Malika Schüpbach (64.5 m) and Bigna Windmüller (62.0 m), Japan's Ayumi Watase (62.0 m), and Canada's Katie Willis (62.0 m). Seyfarth earned the highest style points, placing her 1st after the first round, 0.5 points ahead of Sagen. Gräßler, in 3rd, trailed Sagen by 6.5 points and Seyfarth by 7.0 points.

In the second round, 19 jumpers reached at least 60 meters. Jessica Jerome, who fell in the first round but achieved 95% of the best distance and was allowed to continue, posted the third-best score of the second round, climbing to 14th overall. She was overtaken by the Czech Republic's Vladěna Pustková, who was 14th after the first round. Subsequent leaders included Verena Pock (62.0 m), Yoshiko Yoshiizumi (62.0 m), Jacqueline Seifriedsberger (63.0 m), and Ayumi Watase (64.0 m), who, with the third-best distance of the round, climbed three spots to secure 3rd place. Anette Sagen, jumping second-to-last, landed 0.5 meters shorter than in the first round but earned higher style points than Juliane Seyfarth (67.0 m), who jumped last. Seyfarth's half-meter longer jump was not enough to overcome Sagen's style point advantage, resulting in Sagen's victory by 1.3 points over Seyfarth and 18.5 points over Watase.

Germany's Lea Wallewein was disqualified. Jumpers started from the 8th gate in both rounds.

==== Results (9 August 2006) ====
Place	Athlete	Country					
Place	Athlete	Country	Round 1		Round 2		Total score
Place	Athlete	Country	Jump	Score	Jump	Score	Total score
1.	Anette Sagen	Norway	67.0	125.5	66.5	125.3	250.8
2.	Juliane Seyfarth	Germany	67.0	126.0	67.0	123.5	249.5
3.	Ayumi Watase	Japan	62.0	113.5	64.0	118.8	232.3
4.	Ulrike Gräßler	Germany	64.5	119.0	63.0	112.9	231.9
5.	Alissa Johnson	United States	63.5	115.6	63.0	113.9	229.5
6.	Katie Willis	Canada	62.0	112.0	64.0	116.3	228.3
7.	Jacqueline Seifriedsberger	Austria	61.0	110.6	63.0	116.4	227.0
8.	Line Jahr	Norway	62.0	111.0	63.0	112.9	223.9
9.	Abby Hughes	United States	61.5	110.8	62.0	111.5	222.3
10.	Yoshiko Yoshiizumi	Japan	61.5	110.3	62.0	111.5	221.8
11.	Verena Pock	Austria	60.5	107.4	62.0	112.0	219.4
12.	Malika Schüpbach	Switzerland	64.5	114.5	60.0	103.7	218.2
13.	Vladěna Pustková	Czech Republic	60.5	106.9	61.0	108.6	215.5
14.	Jessica Jerome	United States	63.0	93.4	66.5	120.3	213.7
15.	Atsuko Tanaka	Canada	59.5	105.0	60.0	107.2	212.2
16.	Anna Häfele	Germany	59.5	106.5	59.5	105.0	211.5
17.	Izumi Yamada	Japan	58.0	99.4	61.0	108.6	208.0
18.	Salome Fuchs	Switzerland	57.5	99.7	60.0	107.2	206.9
19.	Katja Požun	Slovenia	59.5	103.5	59.0	102.8	206.3
20.	Nata De Leeuw	Canada	58.5	102.1	59.0	103.8	205.9
21.	Elena Runggaldier	Italy	57.0	98.0	60.5	107.4	205.4
22.	Anja Tepeš	Slovenia	58.5	101.6	58.5	102.1	203.7
23.	Rieko Kanai	Japan	59.0	103.3	57.5	100.2	203.5
24.	Gyda Enger	Norway	57.5	100.2	59.0	102.8	203.0
24.	Avery Ardovino	United States	60.5	105.9	58.5	97.1	203.0
26.	Brenna Ellis	United States	58.5	101.1	58.5	101.6	202.7
27.	Tanja Drage	Austria	58.5	102.1	58.0	100.4	202.5
28.	Bigna Windmüller	Switzerland	62.0	112.0	61.5	89.8	201.8
29.	Melanie Faißt	Germany	59.5	103.5	57.5	96.7	200.2
30.	Magdalena Schnurr	Germany	57.5	100.7	56.0	95.1	195.8
31.	Karin Friberg	United States	56.0	95.1	56.0	94.6	189.7
32.	Evelyn Insam	Italy	55.5	94.4	–	–	94.4
33.	Carina Vogt	Germany	56.0	93.6	–	–	93.6
34.	Eva Logar	Slovenia	55.5	92.9	–	–	92.9
35.	Svenja Würth	Germany	55.5	91.9	–	–	91.9
36.	Sabrina Windmüller	Switzerland	54.5	90.0	–	–	90.0
37.	Monika Pogladič	Slovenia	53.5	88.6	–	–	88.6
38.	Roberta D'Agostina	Italy	54.5	88.5	–	–	88.5
39.	Carina Ziller	Germany	54.0	88.3	–	–	88.3
40.	Zoya Lynch	Canada	54.5	87.5	–	–	87.5
41.	Elisabeth Anderson	United States	53.5	87.1	–	–	87.1
42.	Mari Backe	Norway	53.0	86.4	–	–	86.4
43.	Silje Sprakehaug	Norway	53.0	85.9	–	–	85.9
44.	Franziska Moser	Germany	53.5	84.6	–	–	84.6
45.	Stefanie Krieg	Germany	52.0	84.5	–	–	84.5
46.	Barbara Stuffer	Italy	53.0	83.9	–	–	83.9
47.	Esther Steindl	Austria	52.0	82.5	–	–	82.5
48.	Live Frisak	Norway	52.0	79.5	–	–	79.5
49.	Valentine Prucker	Italy	48.5	75.1	–	–	75.1
50.	Alexandra Ahlborn	Germany	49.0	72.8	–	–	72.8
51.	Wendy Vuik	Netherlands	47.0	70.5	–	–	70.5
52.	Elina Knutsson	Sweden	46.5	64.8	–	–	64.8
53.	Jasmin Hentschel	Germany	44.5	64.5	–	–	64.5
54.	Monika Planinc	Slovenia	46.0	62.6	–	–	62.6
55.	Joanna Gawron	Poland	42.0	52.5	–	–	52.5
56.	Nadine Kostner	Italy	37.5	45.7	–	–	45.7
57.	Gabriela Buńda	Poland	39.0	43.8	–	–	43.8
58.	Simona Senoner	Italy	36.5	40.8	–	–	40.8
59.	Michaela Doleželová	Czech Republic	36.0	36.0	–	–	36.6

=== Bischofshofen ===
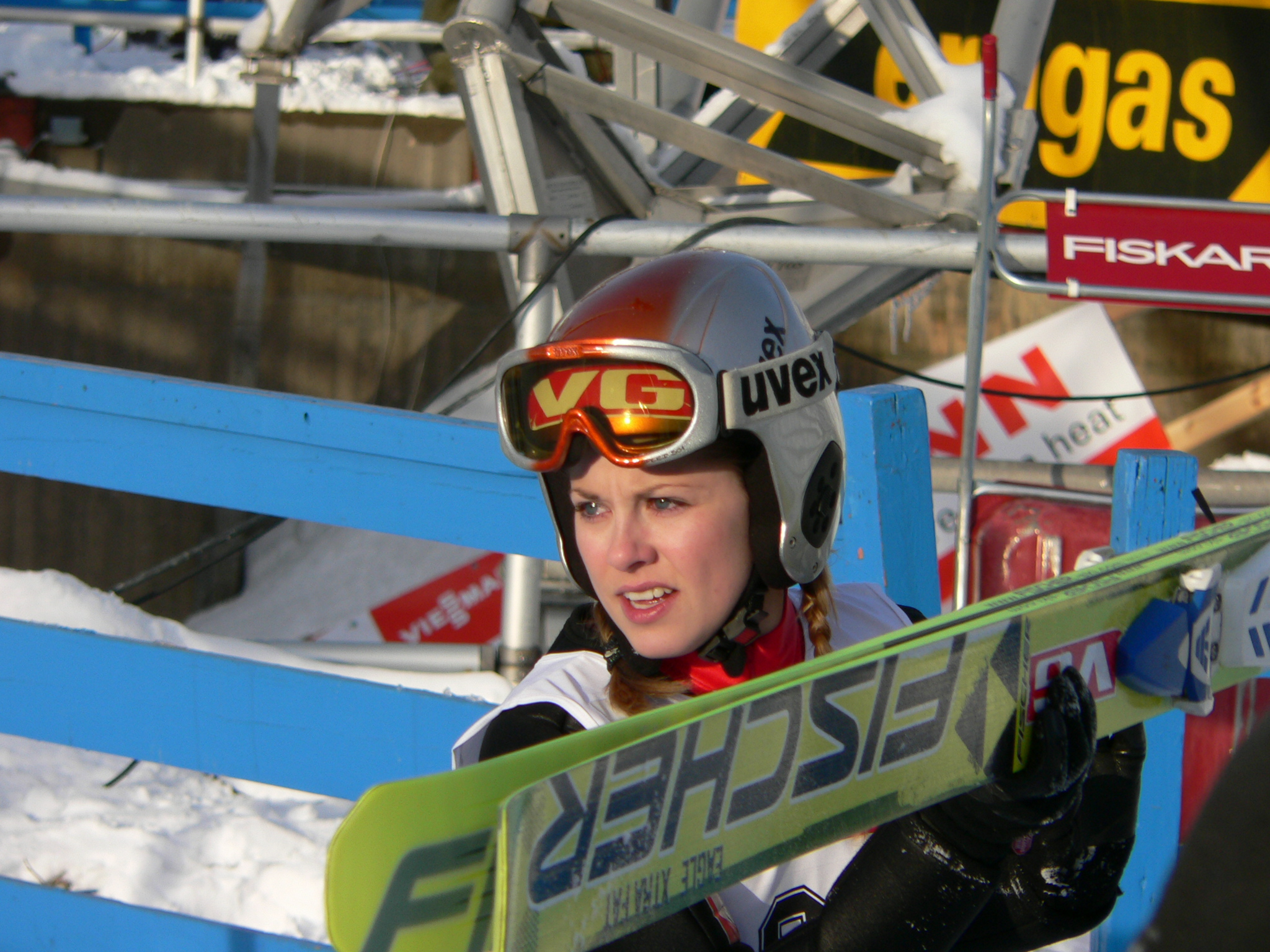
Anette Sagen – winner of the individual competitions in Klingenthal, Meinerzhagen, and Bischofshofen, 3rd in the team competition in Meinerzhagen, and overall winner of the 2006 FIS Sommer Ladies Tournee

The final individual competition of the 2006 FIS Sommer Ladies Tournee was held on the medium-sized hill in Bischofshofen. In the first round, 24 jumpers reached or exceeded the K-point at 68 meters. Anette Sagen landed the farthest at 73 meters. Ulrike Gräßler jumped 72.5 meters but received lower style points, allowing Austria's Daniela Iraschko (70.5 m) and Jacqueline Seifriedsberger (70.0 m), as well as Japan's Izumi Yamada (72.0 m), to surpass her despite shorter jumps. Three others jumped beyond 70 meters: Japan's Ayumi Watase (70.5 m), Germany's Juliane Seyfarth (70.0 m), and the US' Jessica Jerome (70.0 m). After the first round, Sagen led, followed by Iraschko in 2nd and Yamada in 3rd.

In the final round, Tanja Drage, 16th after the first round, was the first to score above 120 points with a 67.5-meter jump. Brenna Ellis, jumping after Drage, landed 0.5 meters shorter, allowing Drage to climb two spots. Canada's Katie Willis (70.0 m) briefly took the lead. The next five jumpers couldn't surpass her. Norway's Line Jahr (69.0 m), 9th after the first round, overtook Willis, but was then surpassed by Ayumi Watase (70.0 m). Germany's Juliane Seyfarth and Ulrike Gräßler, tied for 5th after the first round, achieved the third- and first-best distances of the round, respectively, securing 2nd and 3rd places. Anette Sagen, jumping last, posted the second-best score of the final round, maintaining her lead to win by 7 points.

Jumpers started from the 20th gate in both rounds.

==== Results (15 August 2006) ====
Place	Athlete	Country					
Place	Athlete	Country	Round 1		Round 2		Total score
Place	Athlete	Country	Jump	Score	Jump	Score	Total score
1.	Anette Sagen	Norway	73.0	135.7	71.5	132.1	267.8
2.	Juliane Seyfarth	Germany	70.0	127.0	72.0	133.8	260.8
3.	Ulrike Gräßler	Germany	72.5	127.0	73.0	129.7	256.7
4.	Daniela Iraschko	Austria	70.5	129.7	68.5	124.9	254.6
5.	Jacqueline Seifriedsberger	Austria	70.0	127.5	69.0	125.6	253.1
6.	Ayumi Watase	Japan	70.5	124.7	70.0	127.5	252.2
7.	Jessica Jerome	United States	70.0	127.0	68.5	123.9	250.9
8.	Izumi Yamada	Japan	72.0	128.3	70.0	122.0	250.3
9.	Line Jahr	Norway	68.0	122.7	69.0	124.1	246.8
10.	Katie Willis	Canada	69.0	119.1	70.0	123.0	242.1
11.	Bigna Windmüller	Switzerland	69.0	119.6	68.5	120.4	240.0
12.	Abby Hughes	United States	69.5	121.8	68.5	117.9	239.7
12.	Alissa Johnson	United States	68.0	121.2	67.5	118.5	239.7
14.	Tanja Drage	Austria	66.0	115.9	67.5	121.5	237.4
15.	Brenna Ellis	United States	66.0	116.4	67.0	119.3	235.7
16.	Yoshiko Yoshiizumi	Japan	66.0	115.9	65.5	116.2	232.1
17.	Elena Runggaldier	Italy	65.0	113.5	65.5	115.7	229.2
18.	Vladěna Pustková	Czech Republic	66.5	113.1	66.0	114.9	228.0
19.	Evelyn Insam	Italy	65.5	110.7	66.5	114.1	224.8
20.	Rieko Kanai	Japan	64.0	111.1	65.0	113.5	224.6
21.	Gyda Enger	Norway	64.5	112.8	63.5	111.4	224.2
22.	Anna Häfele	Germany	66.0	111.4	65.5	111.2	222.6
23.	Atsuko Tanaka	Canada	63.5	109.9	65.0	112.5	222.4
24.	Eva Logar	Slovenia	66.0	112.4	63.5	109.4	221.8
25.	Verena Pock	Austria	65.0	111.0	64.5	109.8	220.8
26.	Anja Tepeš	Slovenia	64.0	109.1	64.5	109.8	218.9
27.	Salome Fuchs	Switzerland	64.5	112.8	64.0	103.6	216.4
28.	Nicole Hauer	Germany	64.0	109.6	64.0	105.6	215.2
29.	Malika Schüpbach	Switzerland	69.0	120.1	64.0	83.1	203.2
30.	Nata De Leeuw	Canada	65.5	115.2	58.0	87.7	202.9
31.	Roberta D'Agostina	Italy	63.5	108.9	–	–	108.9
32.	Avery Ardovino	United States	64.5	105.3	–	–	105.3
33.	Melanie Faißt	Germany	63.0	104.7	–	–	104.7
34.	Katja Požun	Slovenia	63.0	104.2	–	–	104.2
35.	Zoya Lynch	Canada	62.5	101.5	–	–	101.5
36.	Barbara Stuffer	Italy	61.5	101.1	–	–	101.1
37.	Monika Pogladič	Slovenia	61.5	100.6	–	–	100.6
38.	Karin Friberg	United States	61.5	99.1	–	–	99.1
39.	Sabrina Windmüller	Switzerland	62.5	97.0	–	–	97.0
40.	Silje Sprakehaug	Norway	59.0	95.1	–	–	95.1
41.	Stefanie Krieg	Germany	58.5	94.9	–	–	94.9
42.	Mari Backe	Norway	58.0	93.2	–	–	93.2
43.	Franziska Moser	Germany	59.0	88.6	–	–	88.6
44.	Stefanie Reischl	Germany	57.5	88.5	–	–	88.5
45.	Live Frisak	Norway	56.5	86.1	–	–	86.1
46.	Elisabeth Anderson	United States	56.5	85.6	–	–	85.6
47.	Esther Steindl	Austria	57.0	85.3	–	–	85.3
48.	Anna Kienzer	Austria	55.0	84.0	–	–	84.0
49.	Michaela Doleželová	Czech Republic	54.0	67.9	–	–	67.9
50.	Monika Planinc	Slovenia	50.0	64.5	–	–	64.5

== Overall tournament classification ==
Below is the final classification of the 2006 FIS Sommer Ladies Tournee, based on the scores from the four individual competitions. A total of 64 jumpers from 13 countries were ranked in this edition of the FIS Sommer Ladies Tournee.

Place	Athlete	Klingenthal	Pöhla	Meinerzhagen	Bischofshofen	Points	Deficit to leader
1.	(Norway) Anette Sagen	230.0 (1)	226.4 (7)	250.8 (1)	267.8 (1)	975.0	0
2.	(Germany) Juliane Seyfarth	227.5 (2)	234.7 (1)	249.5 (2)	260.8 (2)	972.5	2.5
3.	(United States) Jessica Jerome	225.0 (3)	230.1 (3)	213.7 (14)	250.9 (7)	919.7	55.3
4.	(Germany) Ulrike Gräßler	194.5 (15)	232.0 (2)	231.9 (4)	256.7 (3)	915.1	59.9
5.	(Canada) Katie Willis	211.0 (6)	227.4 (5)	228.3 (6)	242.1 (10)	908.8	66.2
6.	(Austria) Jacqueline Seifriedsberger	197.0 (11)	222.2 (10)	227.0 (7)	253.1 (5)	899.3	75.7
7.	(Japan) Ayumi Watase	195.5 (14)	214.4 (12)	232.3 (3)	252.2 (6)	894.4	80.6
8.	(United States) Alissa Johnson	196.5 (12)	227.6 (4)	229.5 (5)	239.7 (12)	893.3	81.7
9.	(Norway) Line Jahr	196.5 (12)	225.3 (8)	223.9 (8)	246.8 (9)	892.5	82.5
10.	(United States) Abby Hughes	207.0 (8)	223.0 (9)	222.3 (9)	239.7 (12)	892.0	83.0
11.	(Japan) Izumi Yamada	212.5 (5)	211.4 (14)	208.0 (17)	250.3 (8)	882.2	92.8
12.	(Switzerland) Bigna Windmüller	206.0 (9)	218.5 (11)	201.8 (28)	240.0 (11)	866.3	108.7
13.	(Japan) Yoshiko Yoshiizumi	184.0 (19)	208.1 (15)	221.8 (10)	232.1 (16)	846.0	129.0
14.	(Italy) Elena Runggaldier	209.0 (7)	187.6 (30)	205.4 (21)	229.2 (17)	831.2	143.8
15.	(Canada) Atsuko Tanaka	185.5 (18)	203.5 (18)	212.2 (15)	222.4 (23)	823.6	151.4
16.	(Czech Republic) Vladěna Pustková	176.0 (22)	203.2 (19)	215.5 (13)	228.0 (18)	822.7	152.3
17.	(United States) Brenna Ellis	176.5 (21)	206.8 (17)	202.7 (26)	235.7 (15)	821.7	153.3
18.	(Japan) Rieko Kanai	186.5 (17)	200.1 (22)	203.5 (23)	224.6 (20)	814.7	160.3
19.	(Germany) Anna Häfele	168.0 (24)	207.6 (16)	211.5 (16)	222.6 (22)	809.7	165.3
20.	(Austria) Tanja Drage	174.5 (23)	193.8 (27)	202.5 (27)	237.4 (14)	808.2	166.8
21.	(Canada) Nata De Leeuw	138.0 (29)	188.0 (29)	205.9 (20)	202.9 (30)	734.8	240.2
22.	(Austria) Verena Pock	74.5 (33)	197.2 (23)	219.4 (11)	220.8 (25)	711.9	263.1
23.	(Germany) Melanie Faißt	184.0 (19)	200.2 (21)	200.2 (29)	104.7 (33)	689.1	285.9
24.	(Switzerland) Salome Fuchs	75.0 (32)	168.4 (31)	206.9 (18)	216.4 (27)	666.7	308.3
25.	(Slovenia) Katja Požun	155.0 (27)	195.0 (26)	206.3 (19)	104.2 (34)	660.5	314.5
26.	(Slovenia) Eva Logar	142.0 (28)	201.8 (20)	92.9 (34)	221.8 (24)	658.5	316.5
27.	(Norway) Gyda Enger	194.0 (16)	–	203.0 (24)	224.2 (21)	621.2	353.8
28.	(Switzerland) Malika Schüpbach	–	195.6 (25)	218.2 (12)	203.2 (29)	617.0	358.0
29.	(Slovenia) Anja Tepeš	62.0 (39)	93.9 (32)	203.7 (22)	218.9 (26)	578.5	396.5
30.	(Italy) Roberta D'Agostina	160.5 (26)	196.5 (24)	88.5 (38)	108.9 (31)	554.4	420.6
31.	(United States) Avery Ardovino	–	212.4 (13)	203.0 (24)	105.3 ( wastes)	520.7	454.3
32.	(Germany) Nicole Hauer	68.0 (35)	193.6 (28)	–	215.2 (28)	476.8	498.2
33.	(Austria) Daniela Iraschko	201.5 (10)	–	–	254.6 (4)	456.1	518.9
34.	(United States) Lindsey Van	218.5 (4)	227.4 (5)	–	–	445.9	529.1
35.	(Italy) Evelyn Insam	–	89.3 (36)	94.4 (32)	224.8 (19)	408.5	566.5
36.	(United States) Karin Friberg	–	88.5 (37)	189.7 (31)	99.1 (38)	377.3	597.7
37.	(Canada) Zoya Lynch	73.5 (34)	90.2 (35)	87.5 (40)	101.5 (35)	352.7	622.3
38.	(Germany) Franziska Moser	64.5 (38)	90.6 (34)	84.6 (44)	88.6 (43)	328.3	646.7
39.	(Germany) Magdalena Schnurr	132.0 (30)	–	195.8 (30)	–	327.8	647.2
40.	(Germany) Stefanie Krieg	55.5 (43)	92.0 (33)	84.5 (45)	94.9 (41)	326.9	648.1
41.	(Italy) Barbara Stuffer	59.5 (42)	82.3 (40)	83.9 (46)	101.1 (36)	326.8	648.2
42.	(Norway) Mari Backe	65.0 (37)	81.6 (42)	86.4 (42)	93.2 (42)	326.2	648.8
43.	(Slovenia) Monika Pogladič	50.5 (46)	75.4 (43)	88.6 (37)	100.6 (37)	315.1	659.9
44.	(Norway) Live Frisak	55.0 (44)	82.2 (41)	79.5 (48)	86.1 (45)	302.8	672.2
45.	(Austria) Esther Steindl	53.0 (45)	74.7 (45)	82.5 (47)	85.3 (47)	295.5	679.5
46.	(Switzerland) Sabrina Windmüller	41.5 (47)	39.6 (52)	90.0 (36)	97.0 (39)	268.1	706.9
47.	(United States) Elisabeth Anderson	–	86.9 (38)	87.1 (41)	85.6 (46)	259.6	715.4
48.	(Germany) Svenja Würth	162.0 (25)	–	91.9 (35)	–	253.9	721.1
49.	(Czech Republic) Michaela Doleželová	61.0 (40)	73.0 (46)	36.6 (59)	67.9 (49)	238.5	736.5
50.	(Slovenia) Monika Planinc	38.5 (48)	67.3 (47)	62.6 (54)	64.5 (50)	232.9	742.1
51.	(Italy) Valentine Prucker	61.0 (40)	84.5 (39)	75.1 (49)	–	220.6	754.4
52.	(Norway) Silje Sprakehaug	–	–	85.9 (43)	95.1 (40)	181.0	794.0
53.	(Germany) Steffi Reischl	–	81.3 (43)	–	88.5 (44)	169.8	805.2
54.	(Germany) Carina Vogt	75.5 (31)	–	93.6 (33)	–	169.1	805.9
55.	(Sweden) Elina Knutsson	34.5 (49)	57.8 (48)	64.8 (52)	–	157.1	817.9
56.	(Germany) Carina Ziller	68.0 (35)	–	88.3 (39)	–	156.3	818.7
57.	(Poland) Joanna Gawron	–	57.3 (49)	52.5 (55)	–	109.8	865.2
58.	(Italy) Nadine Kostner	–	42.9 (51)	45.7 (56)	–	88.6	886.4
59.	(Italy) Simona Senoner	–	45.1 (50)	40.8 (58)	–	85.9	889.1
60.	(Austria) Anna Kienzer	–	–	–	84.0 (48)	84.0	891.0
61.	(Poland) Gabriela Buńda	–	38.3 (53)	43.8 (57)	–	82.1	892.9
62.	(Germany) Alexandra Ahlborn	–	–	72.8 (50)	–	72.8	902.2
63.	(Netherlands) Wendy Vuik	–	–	70.5 (51)	–	70.5	904.5
64.	(Germany) Jasmin Hentschel	–	–	64.5 (53)	–	64.5	910.5

== National team compositions ==
Athlete	Date of birth	Place in FIS Sommer Ladies Tournee 2005	Starts in FIS Sommer Ladies Tournee 2006				Source
Athlete	Date of birth	Place in FIS Sommer Ladies Tournee 2005	Klingenthal	Pöhla	Meinerzhagen	Bischofshofen	Source
Austria (6)
Tanja Drage	19 November 1987	–	23	27	27	14	
Daniela Iraschko	21 November 1983	–	10	–	–	4	
Anna Kienzer	18 July 1990	–	–	–	–	48	
Verena Pock	6 December 1993	36	33	23	11	25	
Jacqueline Seifriedsberger	20 January 1991	24	11	10	7	5	
Esther Steindl	10 February 1991	–	45	45	47	47	
Czech Republic (2)
Michaela Doleželová	12 July 1994	–	40	46	59	49	
Vladěna Pustková	11 July 1992	18	22	19	13	18	
Netherlands (1)
Wendy Vuik	25 November 1988	–	–	–	51	–	
Japan (4)
Rieko Kanai	4 November 1981	–	17	22	23	20	
Yoshiko Yoshiizumi	4 November 1980	6	19	15	10	16	
Ayumi Watase	18 July 1984	–	14	12	3	6	
Izumi Yamada	28 August 1978	–	5	14	17	8	
Canada (4)
Nata De Leeuw	2 February 1991	–	29	29	20	30	
Zoya Lynch	20 February 1991	–	34	35	40	35	
Atsuko Tanaka	25 January 1992	14	18	18	15	23	
Katie Willis	1 May 1991	23	6	5	6	10	
Germany (14)
Alexandra Ahlborn	23 November 1989	–	–	–	50	–	
Melanie Faißt	12 February 1990	7	19	21	29	33	
Ulrike Gräßler	17 May 1987	–	15	2	4	3	
Nicole Hauer	9 March 1987	32	35	28	–	28	
Anna Häfele	26 June 1989	–	24	16	16	22	
Jasmin Hentschel	1987	39	–	–	53	–	
Stefanie Krieg	2 June 1981	29	43	33	45	41	
Franziska Moser	3 October 1989	31	38	34	44	43	
Steffi Reischl	28 March 1991	40	–	43	–	44	
Magdalena Schnurr	25 March 1992	30	30	–	30	–	
Juliane Seyfarth	19 February 1990	9	2	1	2	2	
Carina Vogt	5 February 1992	–	31	–	33	–	
Svenja Würth	20 August 1993	–	25	–	35	–	
Carina Ziller	3 July 1991	–	35	–	39	–	
Norway (6)
Mari Backe	11 March 1987	28	37	42	42	42	
Gyda Enger	14 January 1993	–	16	–	24	21	
Live Frisak	27 June 1989	–	44	41	48	45	
Line Jahr	16 January 1984	3	12	8	8	9	
Anette Sagen	10 January 1985	1	1	7	1	1	
Silje Sprakehaug	4 February 1991	–	–	–	43	40	
Poland (2)
Gabriela Buńda	17 September 1994	–	–	53	57	–	
Joanna Gawron	30 May 1993	–	–	49	55	–	
Slovenia (5)
Eva Logar	8 March 1991	13	28	20	34	24	
Monika Planinc	7 April 1986	–	48	47	54	50	
Monika Pogladič	5 April 1987	20	46	43	37	37	
Katja Požun	7 April 1993	15	27	26	19	34	
Anja Tepeš	27 February 1991	17	39	32	22	26	
United States (8)
Elisabeth Anderson	6 August 1989	–	–	38	41	46	
Avery Ardovino	13 February 1992	37	–	13	24	32	
Brenna Ellis	13 March 1988	10	21	17	26	15	
Karin Friberg	17 November 1989	–	–	37	31	38	
Abby Hughes	21 June 1989	19	8	9	9	12	
Jessica Jerome	8 February 1987	2	3	3	14	7	
Alissa Johnson	28 May 1987	11	12	4	5	12	
Lindsey Van	27 November 1984	4	4	5	–	–	
Switzerland (4)
Salome Fuchs	13 December 1993	–	32	31	18	27	
Malika Schüpbach	22 November 1993	–	–	25	12	29	
Bigna Windmüller	27 February 1991	–	9	11	28	11	
Sabrina Windmüller	13 October 1987	–	47	52	36	39	
Sweden (1)
Elina Knutsson	13 August 1992	–	49	48	52	–	
Italy (7)
Roberta D'Agostina	17 August 1991	25	26	24	38	31	
Evelyn Insam	10 February 1994	–	–	36	32	19	
Nadine Kostner	13 October 1992	–	–	51	56	–	
Valentine Prucker	13 March 1989	33	40	39	49	–	
Elena Runggaldier	10 July 1990	26	7	30	21	17	
Simona Senoner	13 June 1993	–	–	50	58	–	
Barbara Stuffer	7 September 1989	22	42	40	46	36	

== Continental Cup standings after the tournament ==
Overall Continental Cup standings after FIS Sommer Ladies Tournee
Rank	Athlete	Country	Points	Deficit to leader
1	Juliane Seyfarth	Germany	740	–
2	Anette Sagen	Norway	552	188
3	Daniela Iraschko	Austria	376	364
4	Ulrike Gräßler	Germany	351	389
5	Jessica Jerome	United States	346	394
6	Katie Willis	Canada	292	448
7	Alissa Johnson	United States	290	450
8	Jacqueline Seifriedsberger	Austria	261	479
9	Line Jahr	Norway	257	483
10	Ayumi Watase	Japan	252	488
11	Lindsey Van	United States	238	502
12	Abby Hughes	United States	223	517
13	Atsuko Tanaka	Canada	124	616
14	Vladěna Pustková	Czech Republic	118	622
15	Elena Runggaldier	Italy	117	623
16	Izumi Yamada	Japan	109	631
17	Brenna Ellis	United States	108	632
18	Tanja Drage	Austria	101	639
19	Nata De Leeuw	Canada	87	653
20	Bigna Windmüller	Switzerland	80	660
21	Yoshiko Yoshiizumi	Japan	69	671
22	Roberta D'Agostina	Italy	62	678
23	Avery Ardovino	United States	56	684
24	Anna Häfele	Germany	46	694
25	Zoya Lynch	Canada	43	697
26	Rieko Kanai	Japan	42	698
27	Verena Pock	Austria	38	702
28	Yurika Hirayama	Japan	35	705
29	Gyda Enger	Norway	32	708
30	Misaki Shigeno	Japan	31	709
31	Malika Schüpbach	Switzerland	30	710
32	Melanie Faißt	Germany	24	716
33	Katja Požun	Slovenia	21	719
33	Eva Logar	Slovenia	21	719
35	Karla Keck	United States	19	721
36	Salome Fuchs	Switzerland	17	723
37	Jaklyn Devos	Canada	16	724
38	Karin Friberg	United States	14	726
38	Anja Tepeš	Slovenia	14	726
40	Evelyn Insam	Italy	12	728
41	Elisabeth Andersson	United States	11	729
42	Brittany Rhoads	United States	9	731
43	Svenja Würth	Germany	6	734
43	Nicole Hauer	Germany	6	734
45	Magdalena Schnurr	Germany	2	738
