= FIS Nordic World Ski Championships 2011 – Women's individual normal hill =

Women's individual normal hill at the FIS Nordic World Ski Championships 2011
- Venue: Midtstubakken
- Date: 25 February 2011
- Competitors: 43 from 15 nations
- Winning score: 231.7

Medalists
gold medal	Daniela Iraschko	Austria
silver medal	Elena Runggaldier	Italy
bronze medal	Coline Mattel	France

The women's individual normal hill ski jumping event at the FIS Nordic World Ski Championships 2011 was held on 25 February 2011 at 15:00 CET. Lindsey Van of the United States was the defending world champion.

== Results ==
Rank	Bib	Name	Country	Round 1 Distance (m)	Round 1 Points	Round 1 Rank	Final Round Distance (m)	Final Round Points	Final Round Rank	Total Points
1st place, gold medalist(s)	43	Daniela Iraschko	Austria	97.0	118.2	1	97.0	113.5	1	231.7
2nd place, silver medalist(s)	32	Elena Runggaldier	Italy	97.5	113.4	2	93.5	105.5	4	218.9
3rd place, bronze medalist(s)	42	Coline Mattel	France	92.0	98.8	5	97.0	112.7	2	211.5
4	41	Eva Logar	Slovenia	91.0	102.7	4	88.5	95.2	9	197.9
5	34	Maja Vtič	Slovenia	88.5	87.6	18	97.0	108.4	2	196.0
6	33	Sara Takanashi	Japan	92.0	94.7	9	93.0	100.3	6	195.0
7	21	Ayumi Watase	Japan	89.0	91.2	16	93.0	101.6	5	192.8
8	24	Evelyn Insam	Italy	94.5	97.8	6	87.5	90.3	12	188.1
9	40	Melanie Faisst	Germany	88.0	86.8	19	92.0	98.3	7	185.1
10	26	Line Jahr	Norway	89.5	92.4	13	84.5	88.9	13	181.3
11	12	Maren Lundby	Norway	89.5	93.7	10	85.5	86.8	14	180.5
12	15	Yoshiko Kasai	Japan	86.5	86.4	20	89.0	93.3	11	179.7
13	27	Lisa Demetz	Italy	92.5	94.8	8	83.0	83.1	18	177.9
14	39	Jessica Jerome	United States	84.0	83.3	21	90.0	94.5	10	177.8
15	22	Yuki Ito	Japan	89.0	92.1	15	85.0	85.0	15	177.1
16	25	Sarah Hendrickson	United States	90.5	93.1	12	84.0	83.9	16	177.0
17	18	Julia Kykkänen	Finland	91.5	93.2	11	82.0	83.2	17	176.4
18	13	Taylor Henrich	Canada	84.5	77.9	26	92.0	98.0	8	175.9
19	36	Ulrike Grässler	Germany	94.0	103.2	3	79.5	68.2	28	171.4
20	19	Alissa Johnson	United States	91.0	96.7	7	81.0	72.3	26	169.0
21	31	Špela Rogelj	Slovenia	89.5	88.9	17	85.0	78.2	19	167.1
22	28	Anette Sagen	Norway	88.0	92.4	13	80.5	73.5	25	165.9
23	20	Wendy Vuik	Netherlands	87.0	81.7	23	80.0	77.2	21	158.9
24	23	Abby Hughes	United States	86.5	82.6	22	83.0	73.9	24	156.5
25	16	Sabrina Windmüller	Switzerland	83.5	78.6	25	81.5	76.5	23	155.1
26	11	Gyda Enger	Norway	78.5	74.1	29	84.5	78.0	20	152.1
27	10	Roberta D'Agostina	Italy	84.0	74.5	28	82.5	77.0	22	151.5
28	17	Michaela Doleželová	Czech Republic	84.5	81.2	24	72.5	60.6	29	141.8
29	14	Vladěna Pustková	Czech Republic	80.5	72.8	30	78.5	68.6	27	141.4
30	29	Anja Tepeš	Slovenia	83.0	77.2	27	73.5	58.3	30	135.5
31	37	Juliane Seyfarth	Germany	80.5	71.2	31				71.2
32	38	Jacqueline Seifriedsberger	Austria	78.0	71.1	32				71.1
33	6	Lea Lemare	France	75.5	67.3	33				67.3
34	35	Lindsey Van	United States	75.0	61.4	34				61.4
35	30	Anna Häfele	Germany	75.0	58.8	35				58.8
36	9	Lucie Miková	Czech Republic	72.0	55.6	36				55.6
37	8	Irina Taktaeva	Russia	71.5	50.4	37				50.4
38	1	Maria Zotova	Russia	69.5	46.6	38				46.6
39	3	Ma Tong	China	68.5	43.4	39				43.4
40	5	Li Xueyao	China	67.5	37.6	40				37.6
41	7	Anastasiya Veschekova	Russia	64.5	33.7	41				33.7
42	2	Ji Cheng	China	57.5	22.7	42				22.7
43	4	Cui Linlin	China	52.0	3.0	43				3.0
