= Bigna Windmüller =

Swiss ski jumper

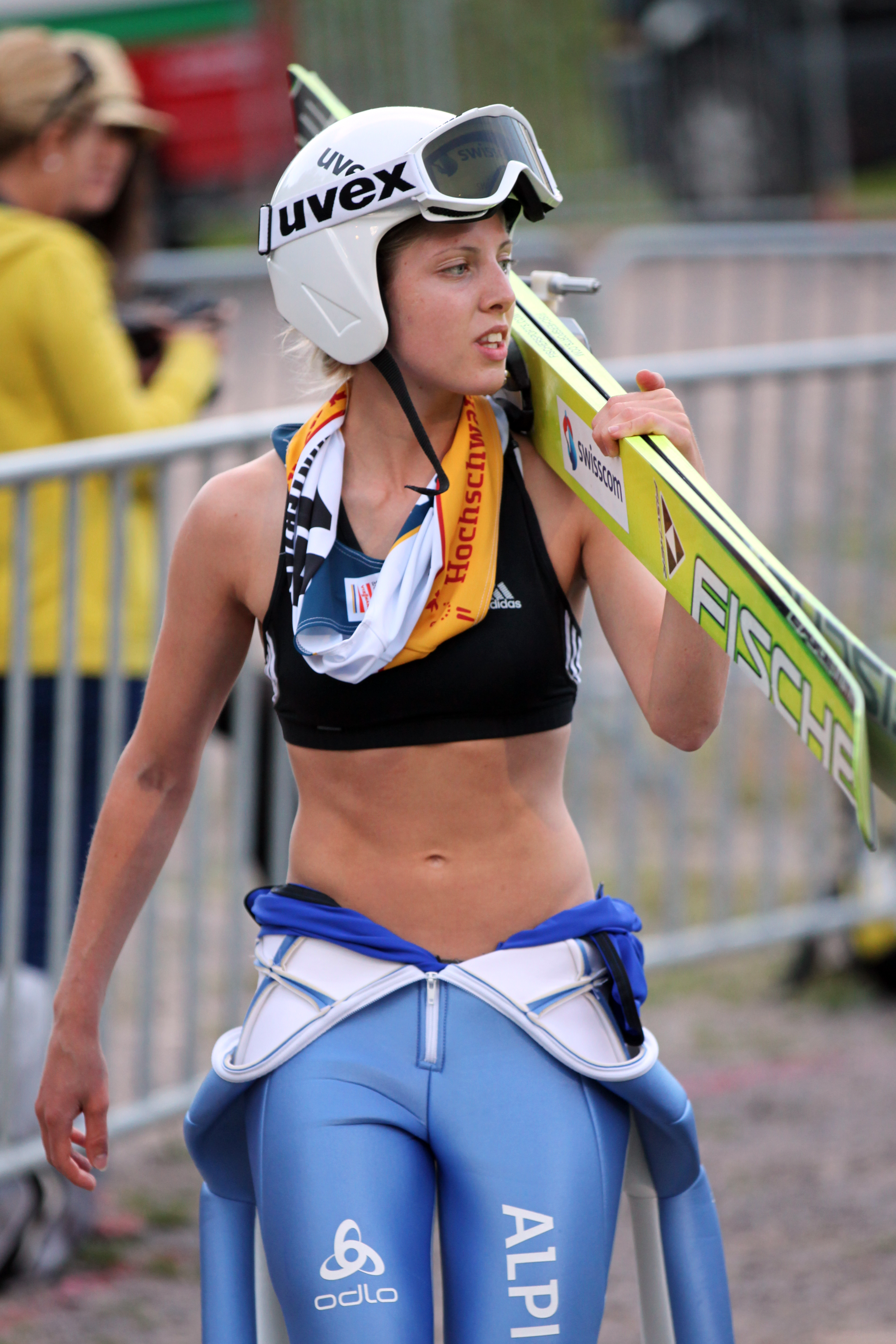
Bigna Windmüller

Bigna Windmüller (born 27 February 1991) is a Swiss ski jumper with one FIS Ski Jumping World Cup podium as an individual. She is set to compete for Switzerland at the 2014 Winter Olympics in the premier of Ski jumping at the 2014 Winter Olympics – Women's normal hill individual. Ski jumper Sabrina Windmüller is her older sister and significant to her being in the sport.
