= Yurika Hirayama =

Japanese ski jumper

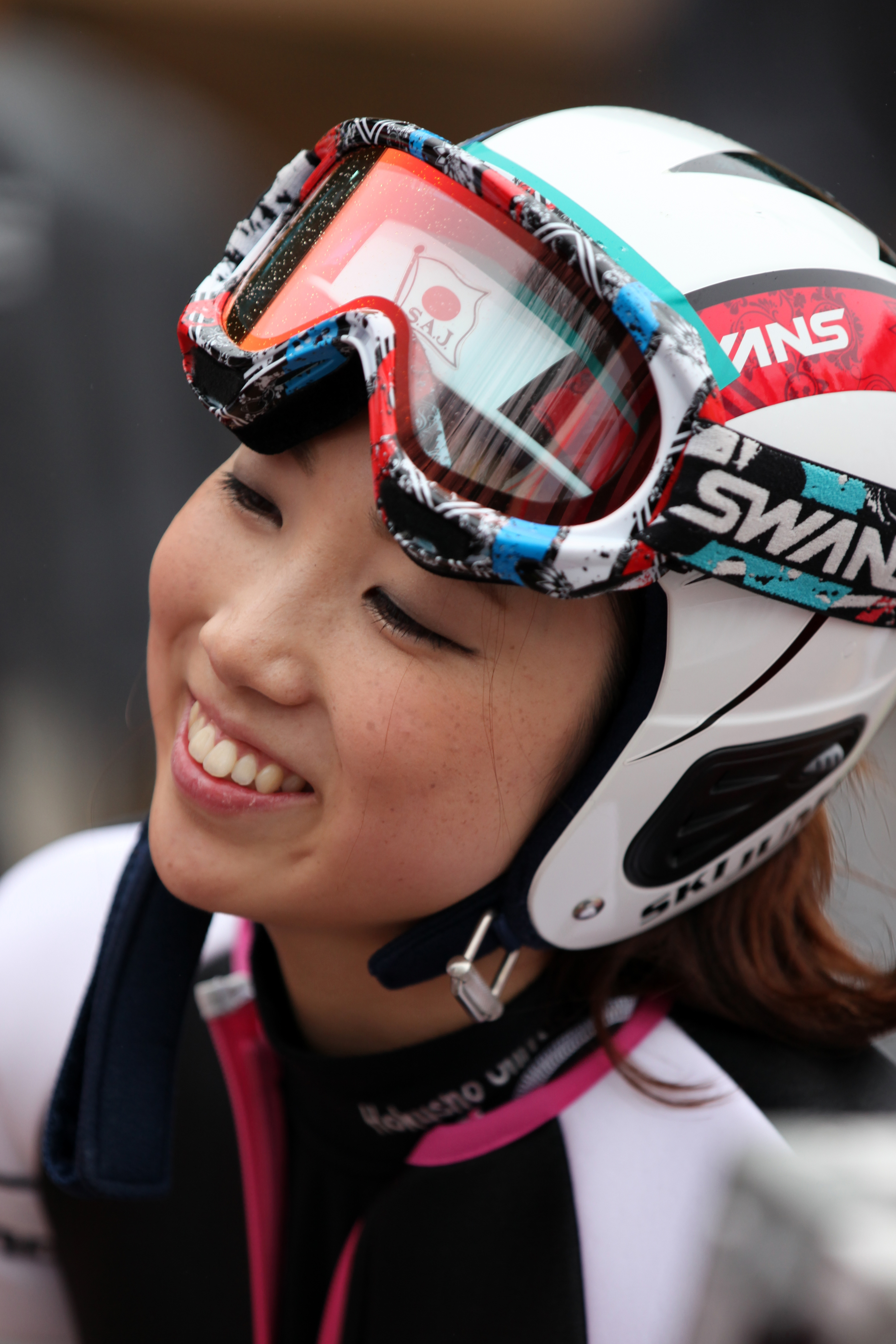

Personal information
- Full name: Yurika Hirayama (平山 友梨香)
- Born: 16 November 1990 (age 35) Sapporo, Japan

Sport
- Sport: Skiing
- Club: Hokusho University Ski Club
- Updated on 6 January 2013

Yurika Hirayama (平山 友梨香, Hirayama Yurika; born 16 November 1990) is a Japanese ski jumper and the 2011 World University Vice Champion.

== Career ==
At the age of 14, Hirayama started her career as a ski jumper at the FIS Race in Sapporo in 2005 where she placed eighth. In 2007, Hirayama placed 22nd at the Junior World Championships in Tarvisio but did not take part in races outside Japan until 2010. In 2010, at the Junior World Championships in Hinterzarten she placed 24th. In the 2011–12 season, Hirayama took part in the World Cup competitions in Zao, placing 35th and 34th. In the 2012–13 season, she competed the World Cup series (Lillehammer: 46th, Sochi: 36th and 38th, Ramsau: 27th, Schonach: 22nd and 30th).
