= Atsuko Tanaka (ski jumper) =

Canadian ski jumper (born 1992)

Atsuko Tanaka 田中温子
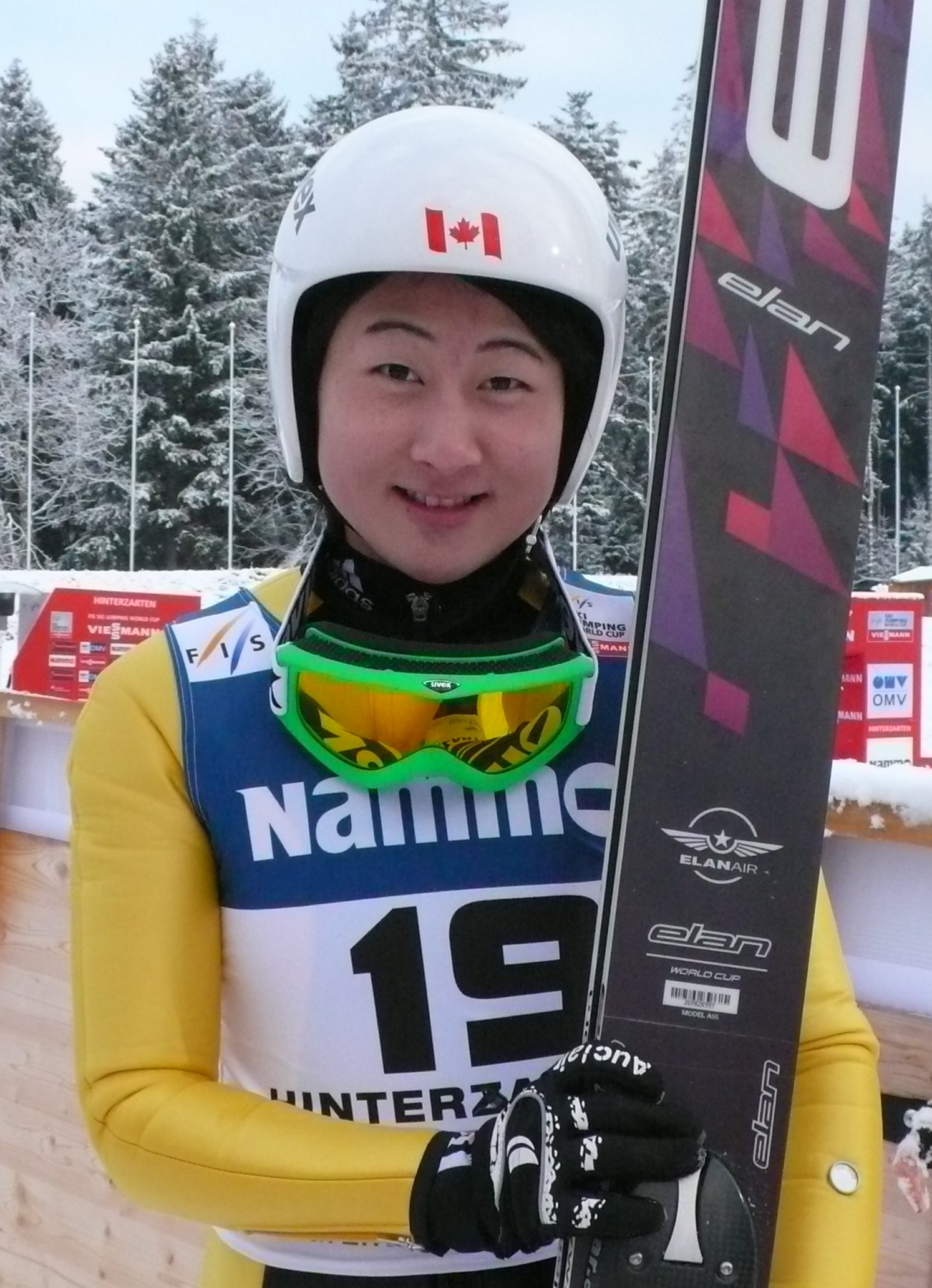

Personal information
- Full name: Atsuko Tanaka
- Born: January 25, 1992 (age 34) Calgary, Alberta

Sport
- Sport: Skiing
- Club: Altius Nordic Ski Club

World Cup career
- Seasons: 2011–
- Indiv. wins: 0
Medal record
FIS Nordic Junior World Ski Championships
Silver medal – second place	2006 Kranj	Individual NH
- Updated on February 28, 2016

Atsuko Tanaka (田中温子, Tanaka Atsuko) (born January 25, 1992) is a Canadian Olympic ski jumper from Calgary, Alberta. Tanaka first started ski jumping when she was ten, later competing internationally in 2004, at the age of 12. In October 2005, when she was 13, Tanaka won gold in a Continental Cup event. At the 2006 World Junior Championships, Tanaka placed second, winning silver. In 2008, she got her second Continental Cup victory. Tanaka's career-best happened in 2014 at the Sapporo World Cup, where she placed 4th. In the 2014 Sochi Winter Olympics, Tanaka placed 12th, which was Canada's best Ladies result until 2022, where a mixed team won bronze. Tanaka moved on from competing in 2018, after recovering from two ACL tears in her left knee, as well as a concussion she got from a car accident.
