= Gyda Enger =

Norwegian ski jumper

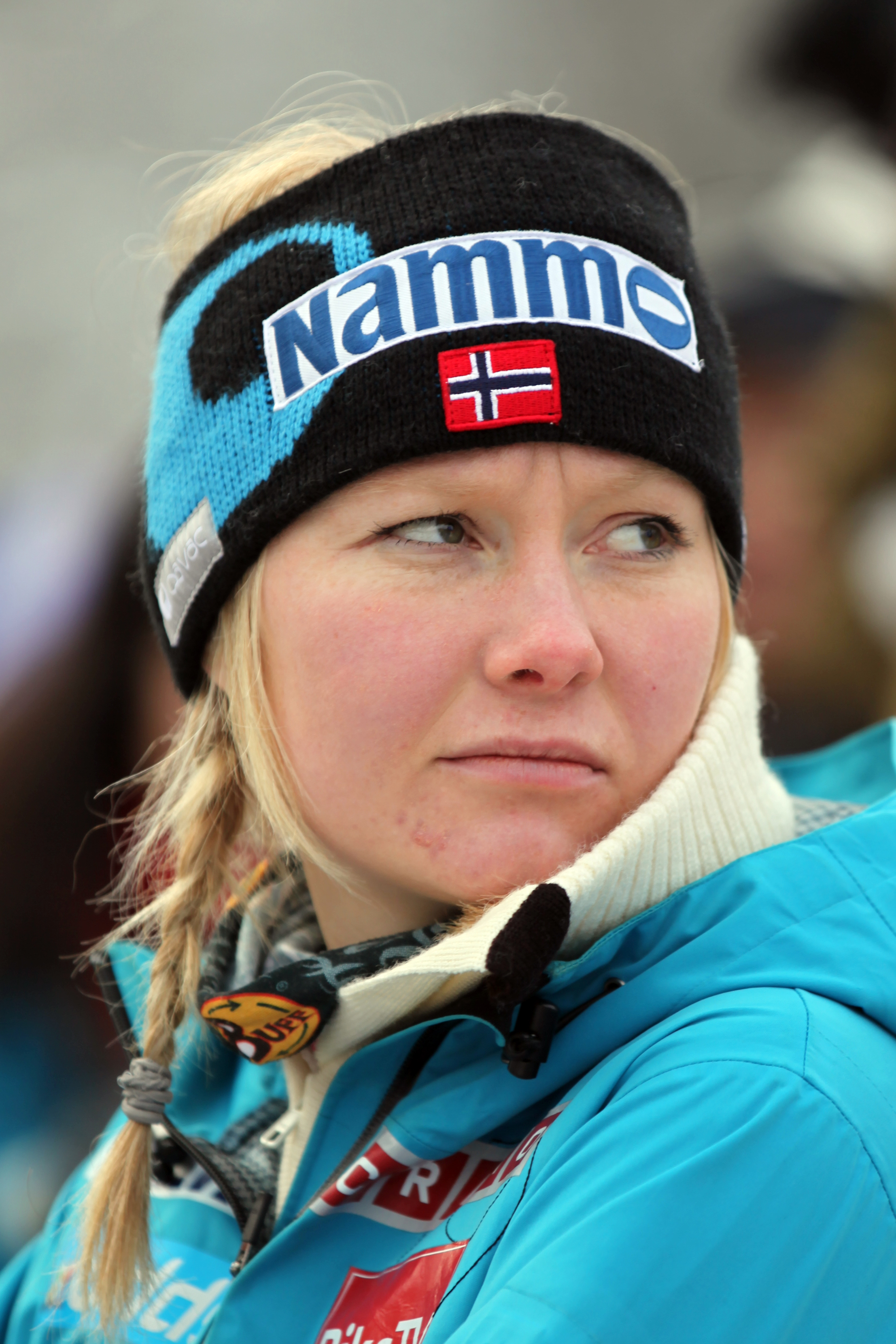
Gyda Enger at the World Cup in Hinterzarten, 2013.

Gyda Enger (born 14 January 1993) is a Norwegian ski jumper, who represents the club Hernes IL.

She made her debut in the Continental Cup, the highest level in women's ski jumping, on 8 March 2006 with a 19th place finish in a competition in Våler Municipality. She has finished among the top 10 five times.

Fifteen years old in 2008, she was selected for the first Norwegian national team to compete in a World Championship, together with Anette Sagen, Line Jahr and Silje Sprakehaug.

She represented Norway at the 2011 World Championship in Oslo.
