= Simona Senoner =

Italian ski jumper (1993–2011)

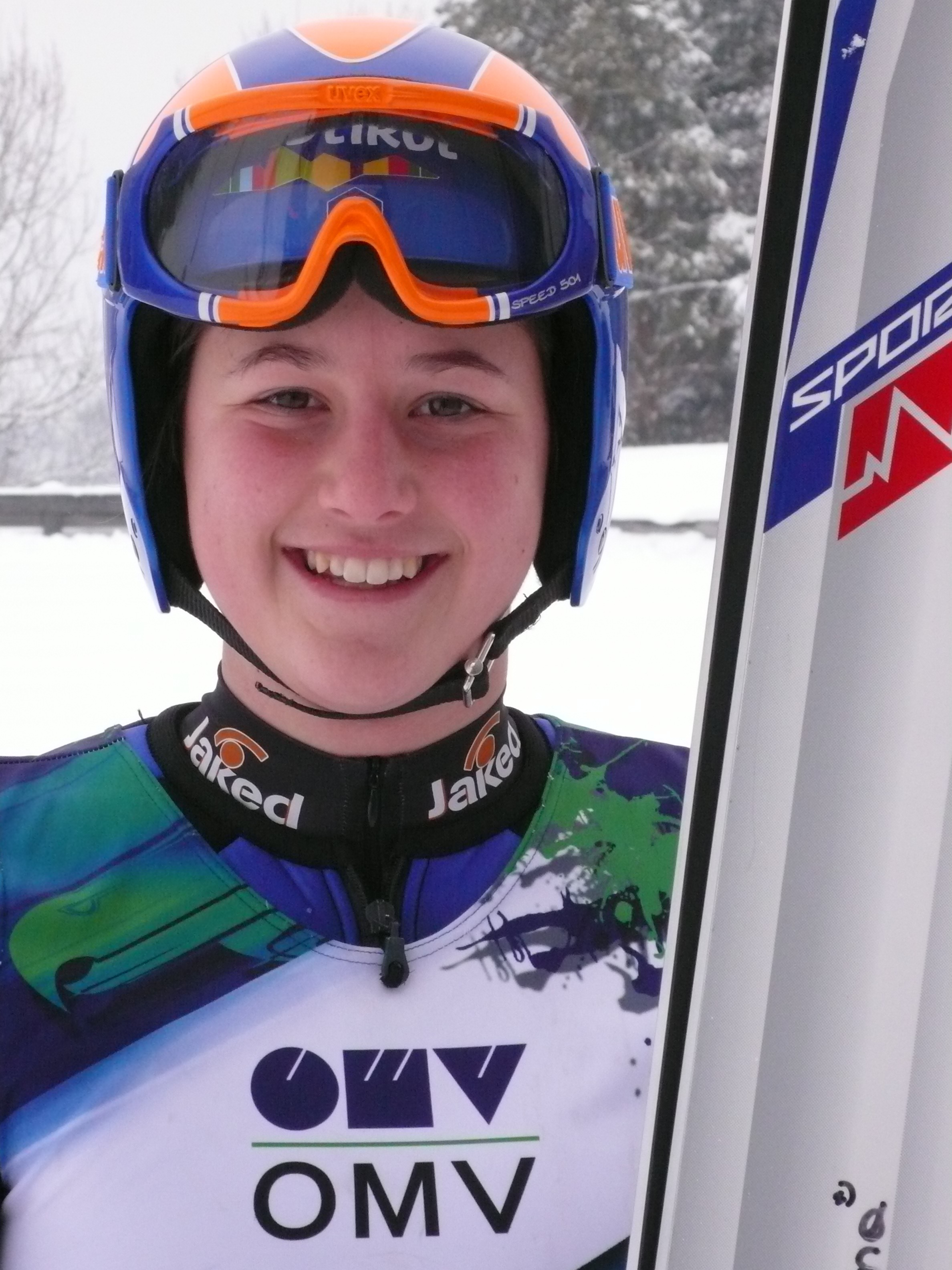

Personal information
- Born: 13 June 1993 Bolzano, South Tyrol, Italy
- Died: 7 January 2011 (aged 17) Freiburg im Breisgau, Baden-Württemberg, Germany

Sport
- Sport: Skiing
- Club: Sci Club Gardena Raiffeisen

World Cup career
- Seasons: 2008–2011
- Indiv. podiums: 0
- Indiv. wins: 0

Simona Senoner (13 June 1993 – 7 January 2011) was an Italian cross-country racer and ski jumper.

== Biography ==
Senoner was born in Bolzano, in the province of South Tyrol, and lived in Santa Cristina Gherdëina, in the Ladin-speaking territory of the province. From 2008 to her death she was a member of the Italian ski jumper team. She was a niece of Italian skier Peter Runggaldier.

== Death ==
At the time of her death she was competing in the Continental Cup meet. After suddenly falling ill in her hotel room, she was airlifted to University Medical Center Freiburg, where she was pronounced dead after about 24 hours. Initial tests indicated she may have died from a rapid onset of meningitis. As a tribute, all Italian winter sports athletes wore black armbands the following Sunday.

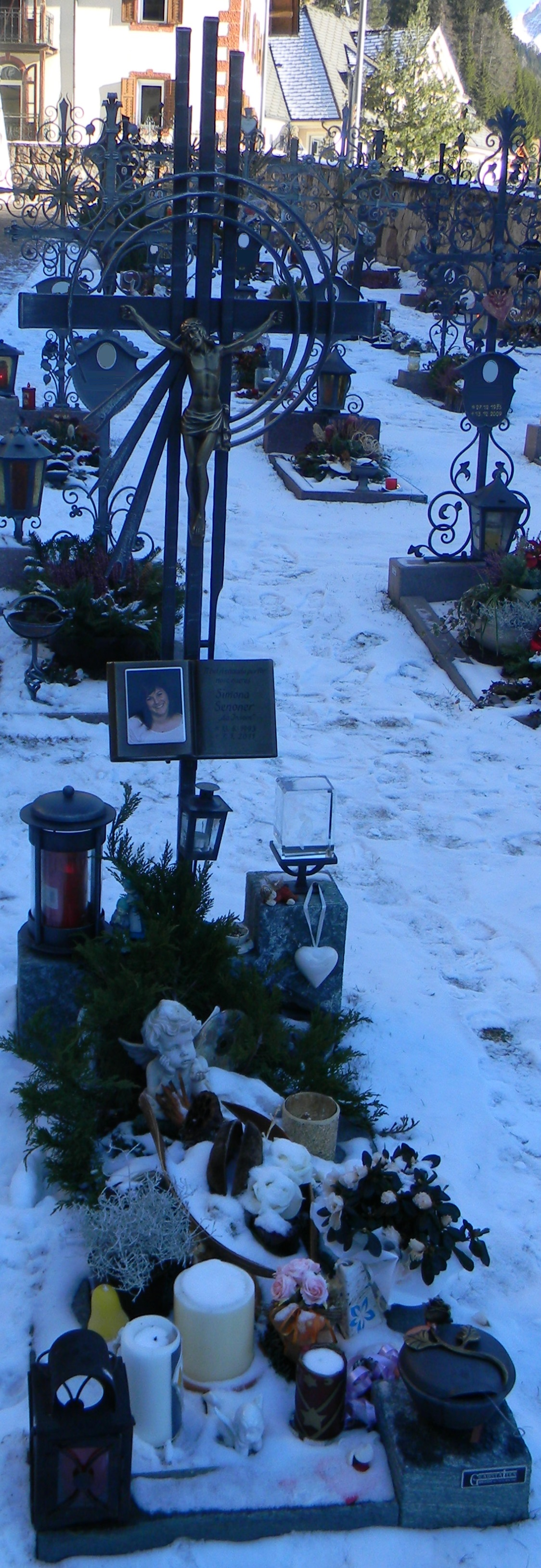
Senoner's tomb in the cemetery of Santa Cristina Valgardena.

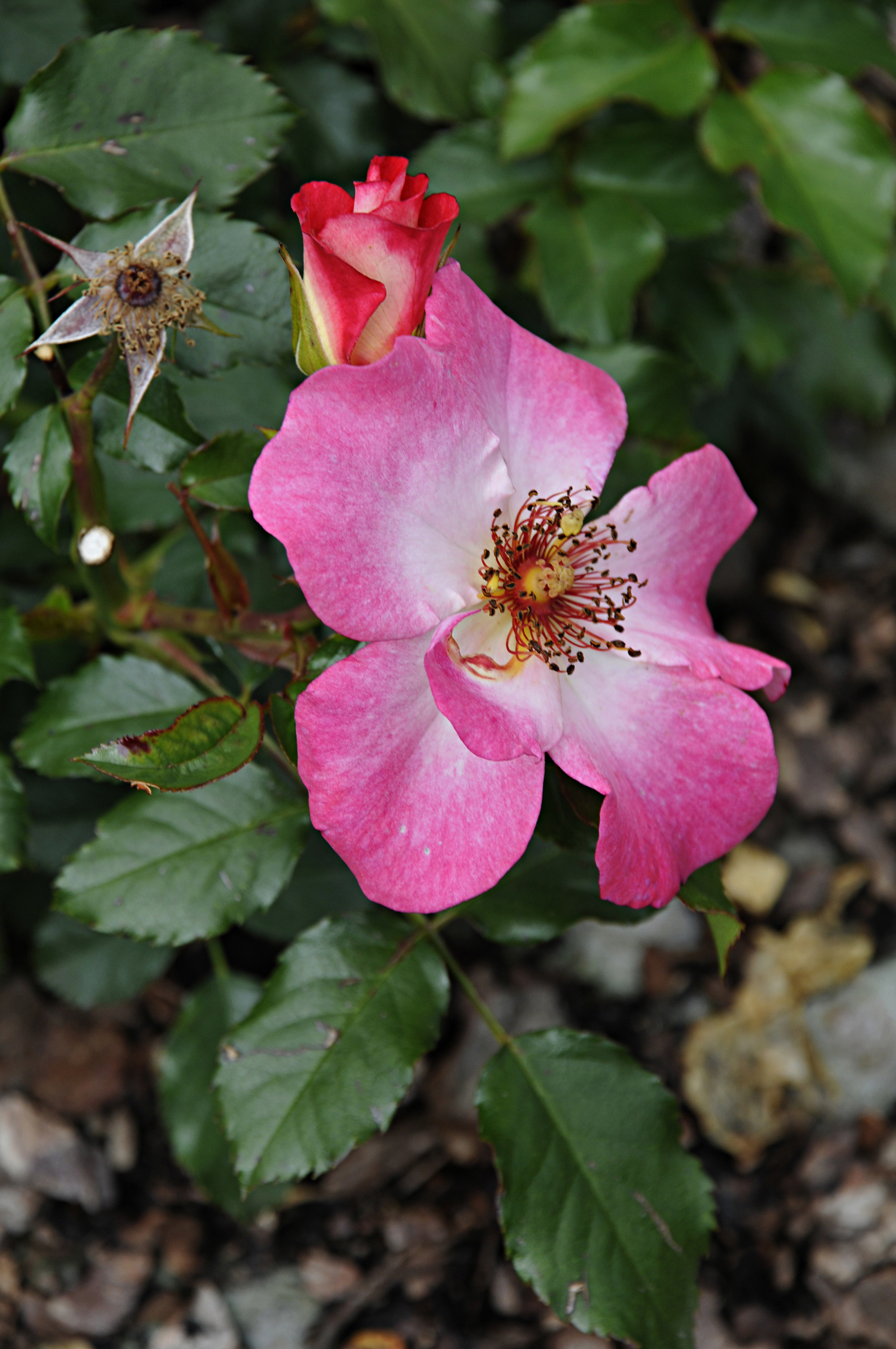
The rose Dolomiti dedicated to the ski jumper on 30 July 2011
