= Jessica Jerome =

American ski jumper

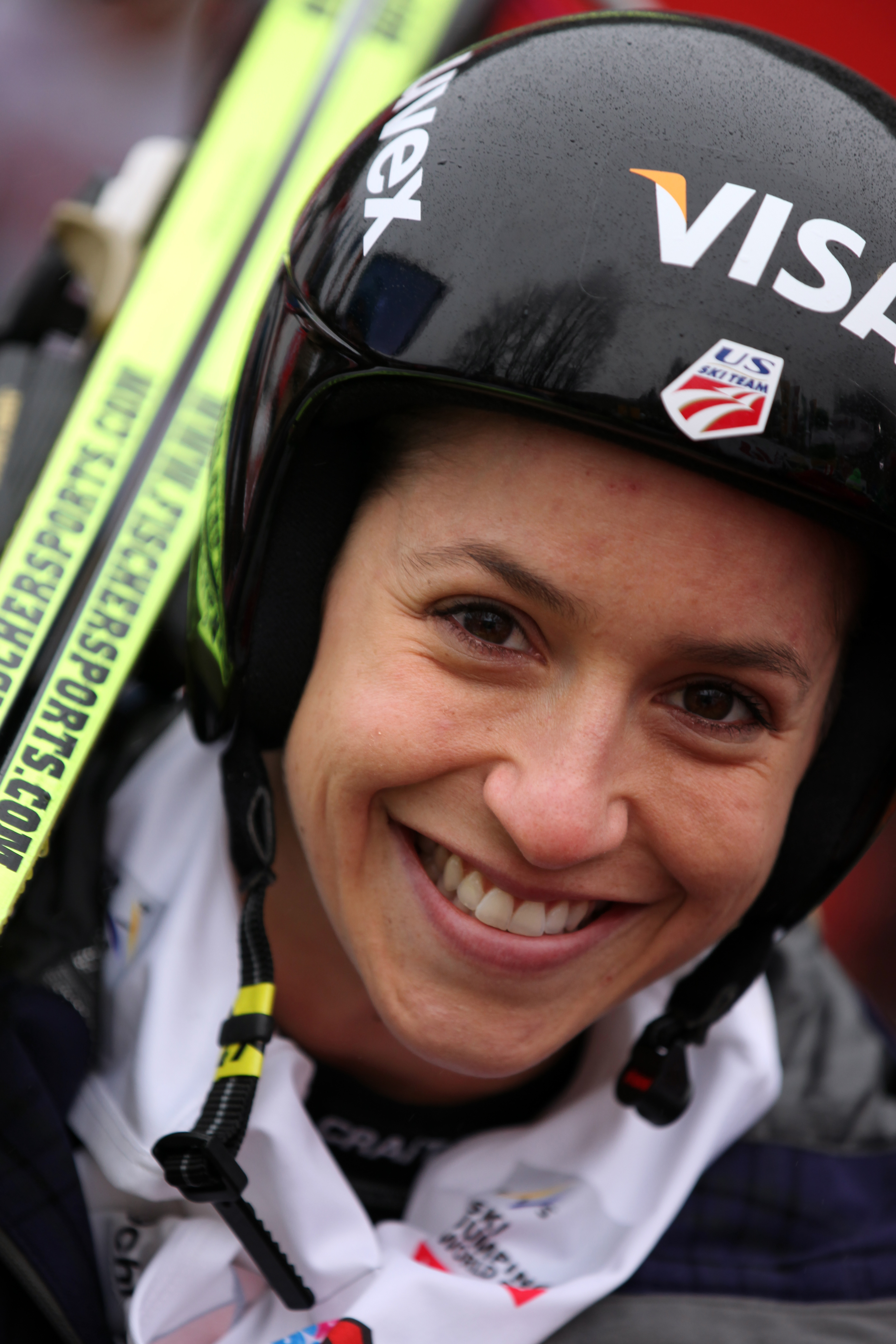

Personal information
- Full name: Jessica Anne Jerome
- Nickname: JJ
- Born: February 8, 1987 (age 39) Jacksonville, Florida, U.S.

Sport
- Sport: Skiing
- Club: Park City Nordic Ski Club

World Cup career
- Seasons: 2012–
- Indiv. podiums: 1

Achievements and titles
- Personal bests: 138m, Lillehammer K120
- Updated on 8 January 2012

Jessica Anne Jerome (born February 8, 1987) is an American ski jumper who has been competing since 2000. She started ski jumping aged seven and in 2001 became a Junior Olympic champion. She holds the honor of being a three-time national champion (with wins in 2002, 2003 and 2005). In 2006, she finished third in the Continental Cup, behind Anette Sagen and Lindsey Van.

On December 29, 2013, Jerome became the first U.S. woman to win the U.S. Olympic Trials in women’s ski jumping. Her combined two jumps scored 248.5 points in her hometown of Park City, Utah.
