= Abby Ringquist =

American ski jumper (born 1989)

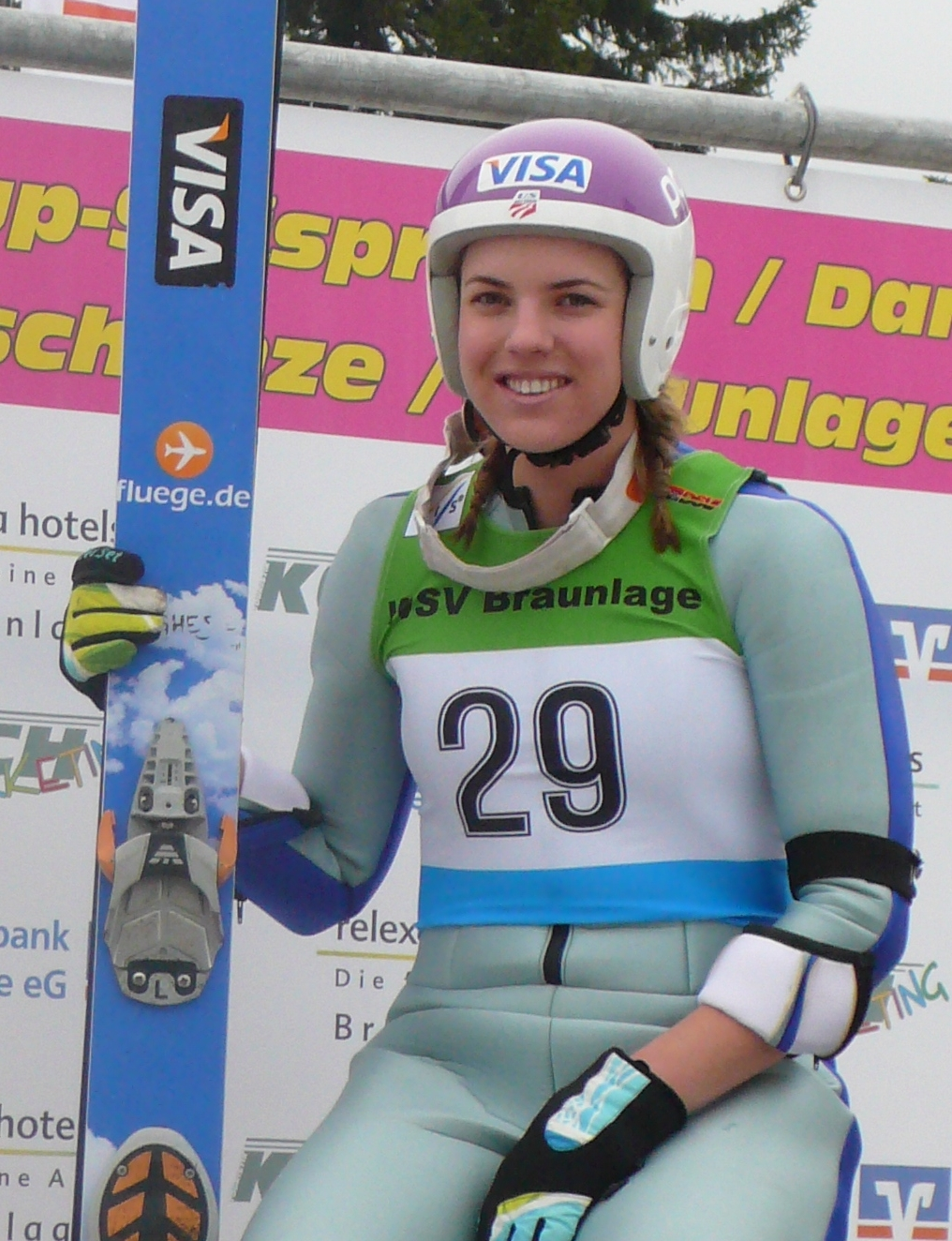
- Ringquist in 2011

Personal information
- Nationality: United States
- Born: June 21, 1989 (age 37) Salt Lake City, Utah, U.S.

Sport
- Sport: Skiing

World Cup career
- Seasons: 2012–2018
- Indiv. starts: 71
- Team starts: 2

Achievements and titles
- Personal bests: 133 m (436 ft); Lillehammer
- Updated on February 13, 2018

Abby Ringquist (née Hughes; born June 21, 1989) is an American former ski jumper who competed from 2004 to 2018.

== Career ==
Ringquist made her World Cup debut in the 2011/12 season, with her best individual result being ninth place in Sochi on December 9, 2012; her best team result was seventh in Zaō on 20 January 2018. In her final event before retiring, she competed at the 2018 Winter Olympics in Pyeongchang, finishing 29th in the individual competition.
