= Anja Tepeš =

Slovenian ski jumper

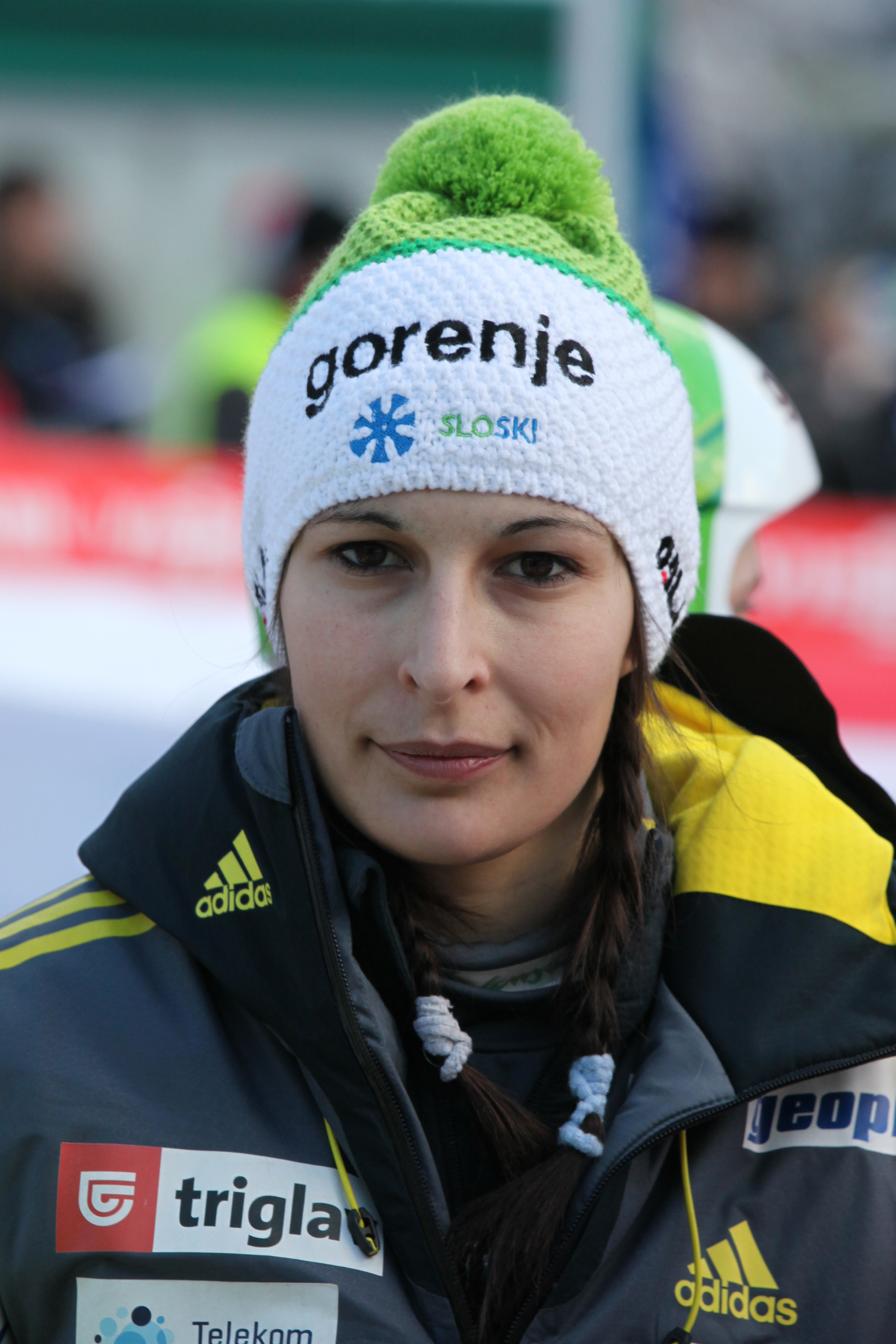

Personal information
- Full name: Anja Tepeš
- Born: 27 February 1991 (age 35) Ljubljana, SR Slovenia, Yugoslavia

Sport
- Sport: Ski jumping

World Cup career
- Seasons: 2012–2014
- Indiv. starts: 29

Anja Tepeš (born 27 February 1991) is a retired Slovenian ski jumper. She made her World Cup debut on 3 December 2011 in Lillehammer, Norway. Anja is the daughter of Miran Tepeš and the sister of Jurij Tepeš, who are both former ski jumpers.
