= Ulrike Gräßler =

German ski jumper

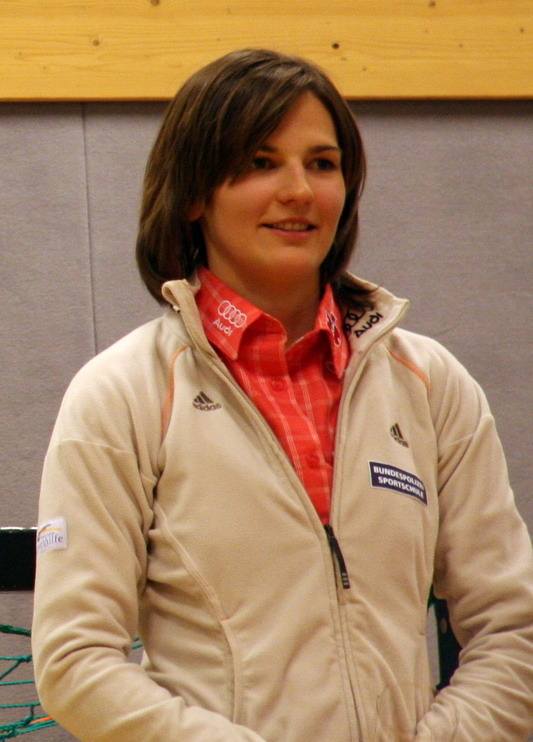

Personal information
- Full name: Ulrike Gräßler
- Born: 17 May 1987 (age 39) Eilenburg, Bezirk Leipzig, East Germany
- Height: 1.73 m (5 ft 8 in)

Sport
- Sport: Skiing
- Club: VSC Klingenthal

World Cup career
- Seasons: 2012–
- Indiv. podiums: 2
Medal record
Women's ski jumping
Representing Germany
World Championships
Silver medal – second place	2009 Liberec	Individual NH
Bronze medal – third place	2013 Val di Fiemme	Mixed team NH
- Updated on 3 March 2012

Ulrike Gräßler (also spelled Graessler, born 17 May 1987) is a German ski jumper who has competed since 2003. She won a silver medal in the inaugural women's ski jumping event at the FIS Nordic World Ski Championships 2009 in Liberec.

Grässler has a total of eight Continental Cup victories in her career.

She competed for Germany at the 2014 Winter Olympics.
