= Ayumi Watase =

Japanese ski jumper (born 1984)

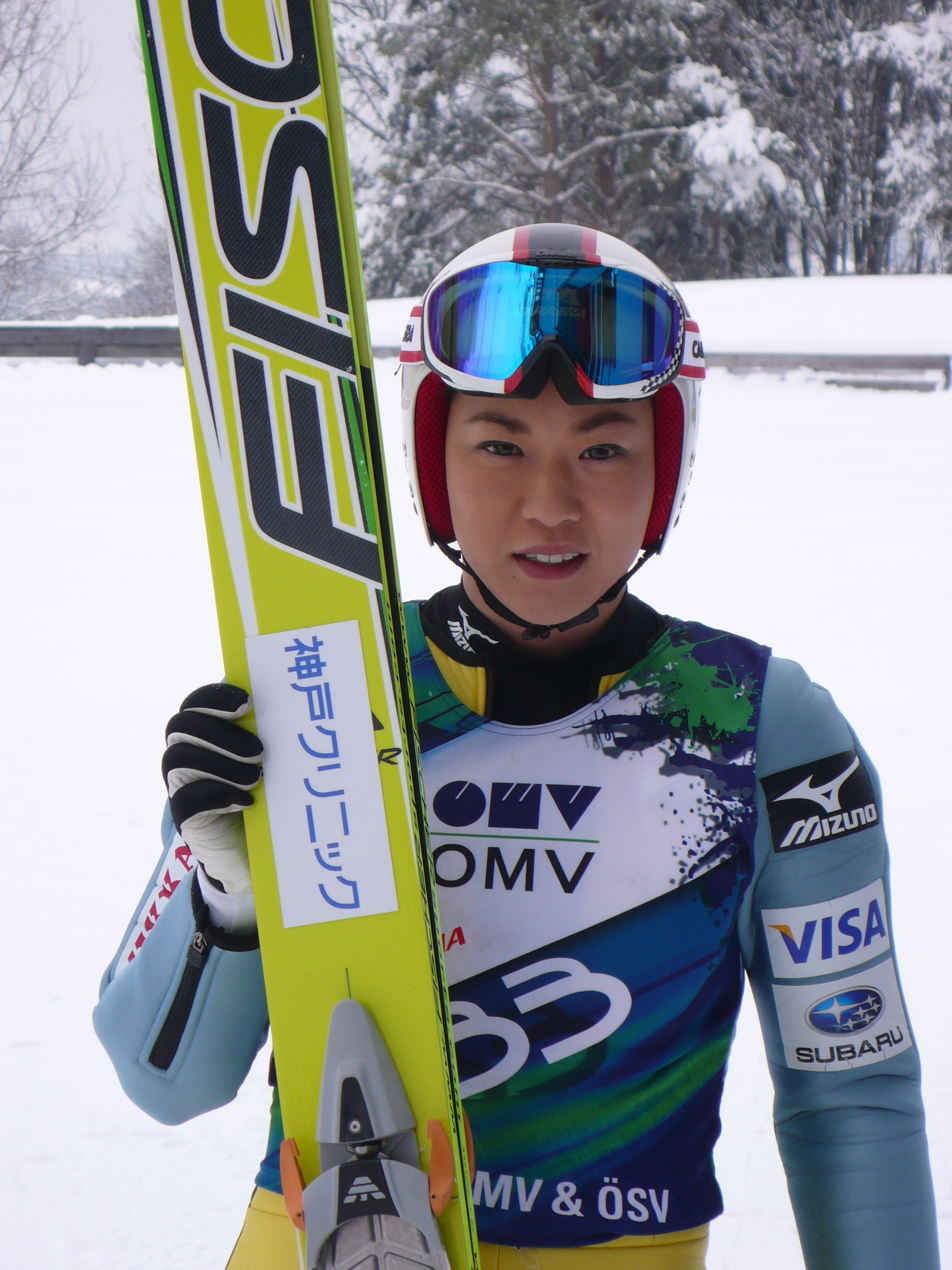
- Ayumi Watase at the Ski jumping Continental Cup in Villach, February 2010

Personal information
- Born: 18 July 1984 (age 40)

Sport
- Sport: Ski jumping

Ayumi Watase (渡瀬 あゆみ, Watase Ayumi, born 18 July 1984) is a Japanese ski jumper who represents the Kobe Clinic Ski Team.

She placed seventh in the 2011 World Championship in Oslo.
