= Melanie Faisst =

German ski jumper (born 1990)

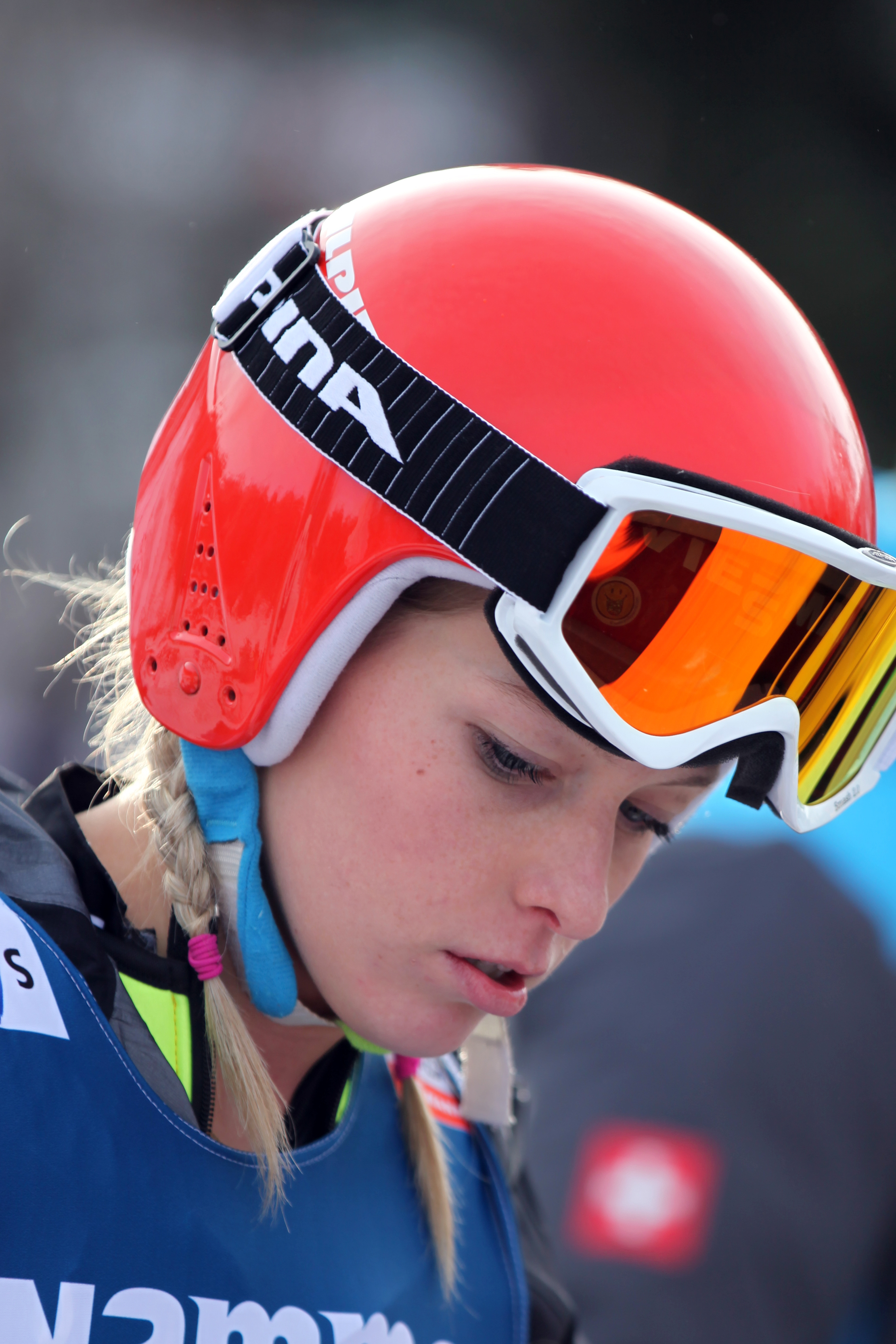

Personal information
- Full name: Melanie Faisst
- Born: 12 February 1990 (age 36) Titisee-Neustadt, Germany
- Height: 1.71 m (5 ft 7 in)

Sport
- Sport: Skiing
- Club: SV Baiersbronn

World Cup career
- Seasons: 2012–
- Indiv. podiums: 1

Achievements and titles
- Personal best: 138 m (Titisee-N. 2009)
- Updated on 3 December 2011

Melanie Faisst (Melanie Faißt, born 12 February 1990 in Titisee-Neustadt) is a German ski jumper. Her World Cup debut was on 3 December 2011 in Lillehammer, Norway where she was on the third place.
