= Eva Logar =

Slovenian ski jumper (born 1991)

Eva Bastardi
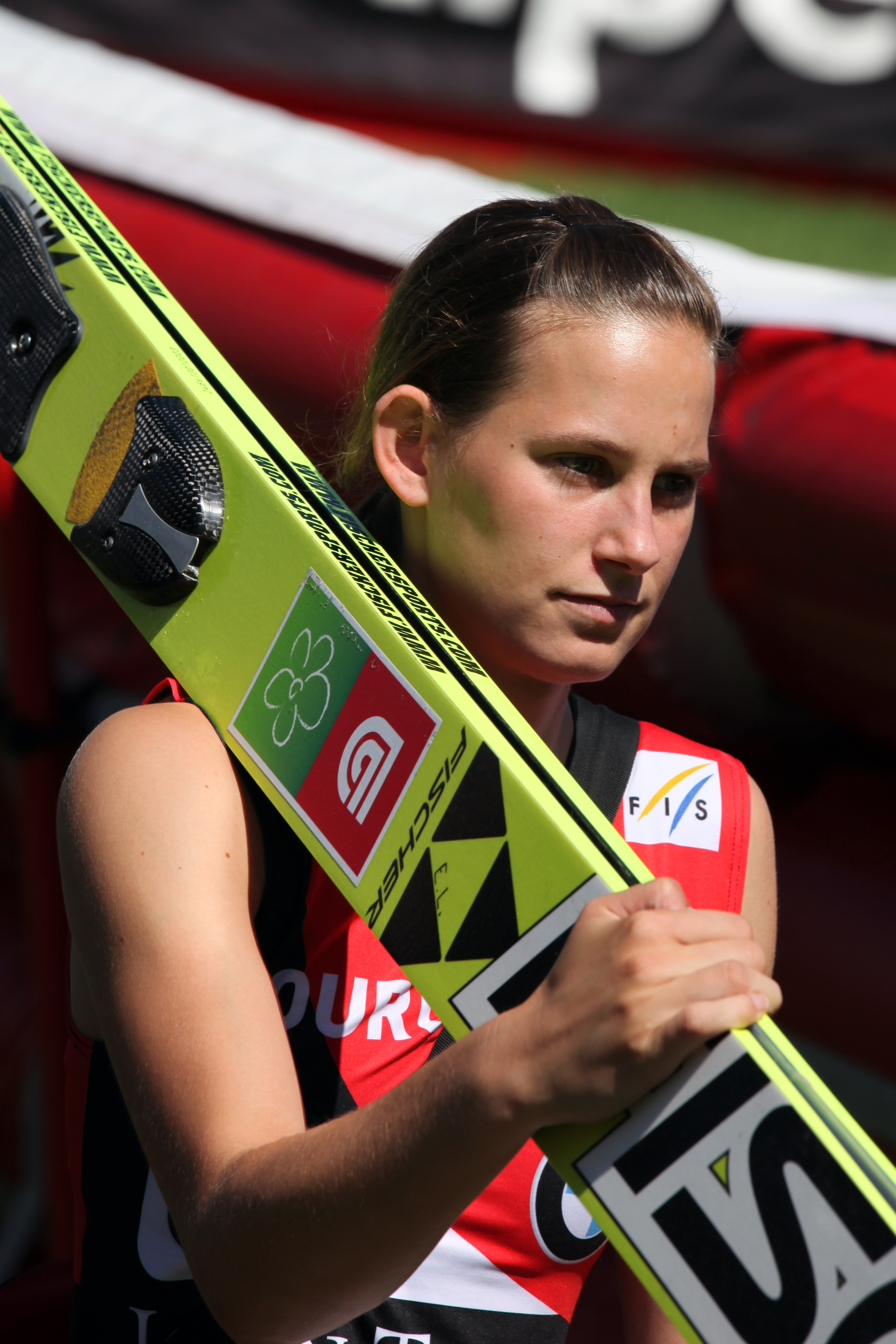

Personal information
- Born: 8 March 1991 (age 35) Ljubljana, SFR Yugoslavia

Sport
- Sport: Ski jumping

World Cup career
- Seasons: 2013–2017
- Indiv. starts: 65
- Team starts: 1

Eva Bastardi (née Logar; born 8 March 1991) is a retired Slovenian ski jumper.

Her biggest career result was fourth place at the 2011 World Championships in Oslo.

She competed at the 2014 Winter Olympics in Sochi, where she placed 27th in normal hill competition.
