= Anna Häfele =

German ski jumper

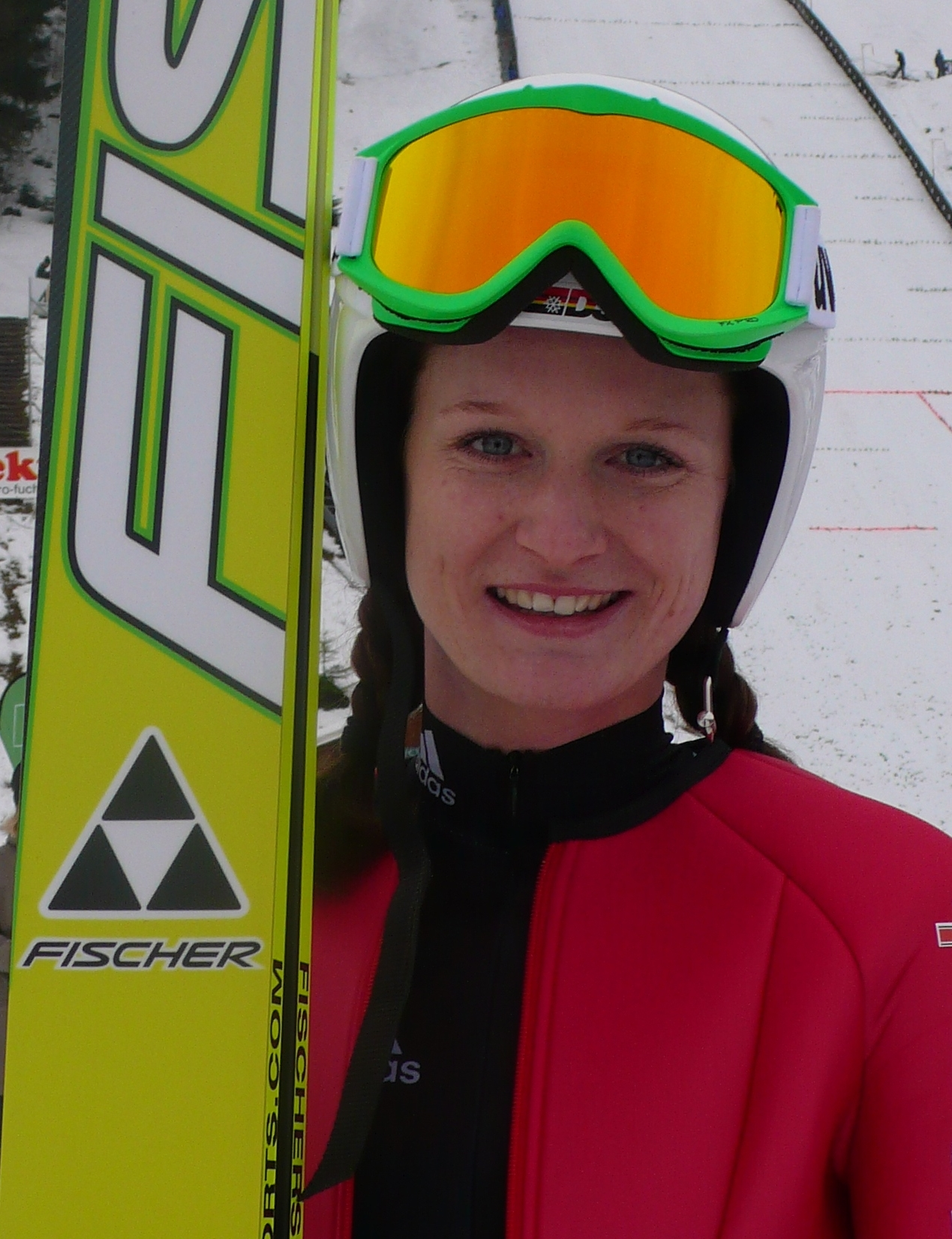
Anna Häfele

Anna Häfele (born 26 June 1989 in Bad Arolsen, Hesse) is a German ski jumper. She came at the second place in the FIS Junior Ski Jumping World Championships 2009 in Štrbské Pleso, Slovakia. She received an eight place in the World Championship in Liberec 2009 and has three wins from the Ladies Continental Cup (the highest level).
