= Line Jahr =

Norwegian ski jumper

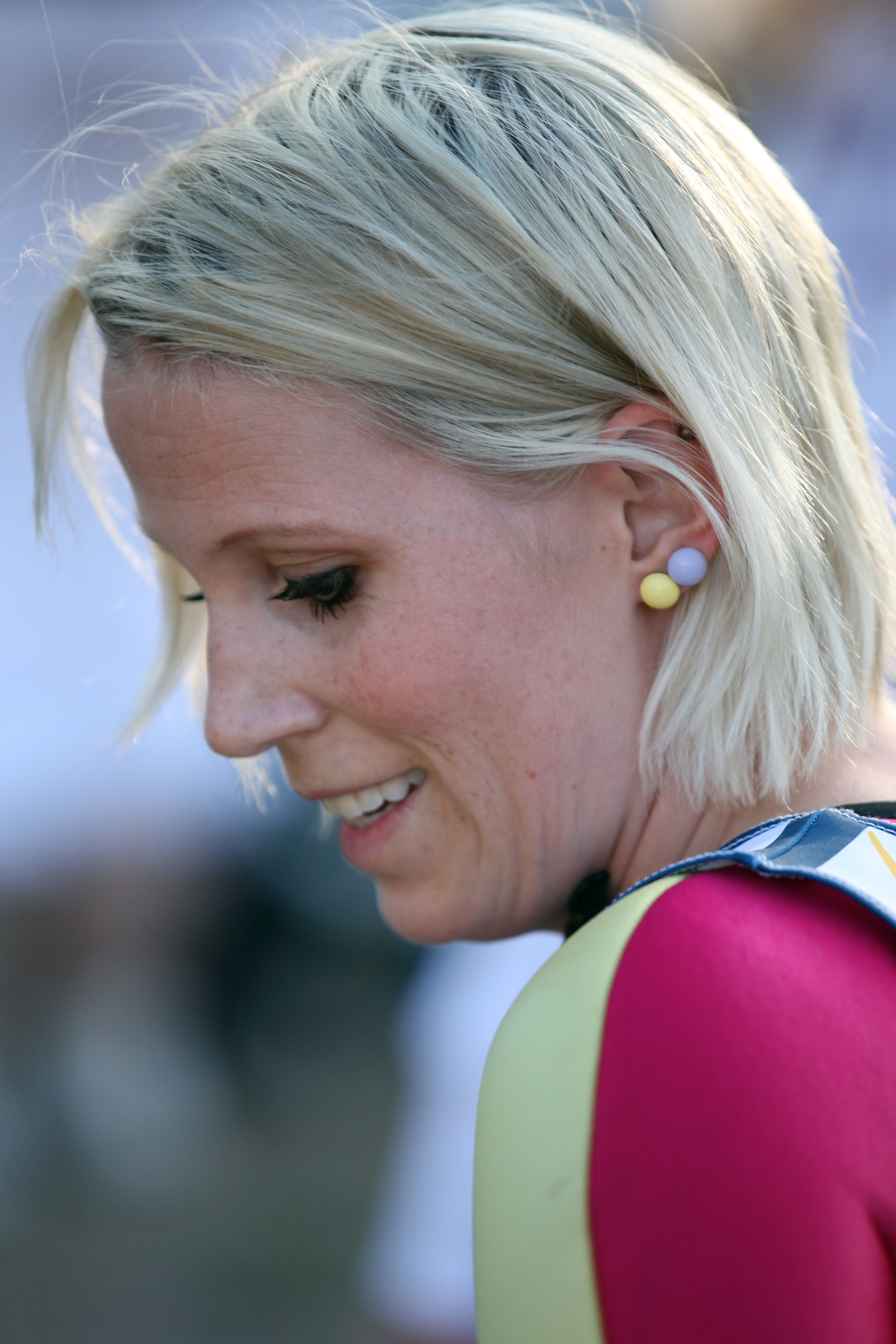
- Jahr in 2012

Medal record

Women's ski jumping

Representing Norway

World Championships
Silver medal – second place	2015 Falun	Mixed team NH

Line Jahr (born 16 January 1984 in Drammen) is a retired Norwegian ski jumper.

She came in ninth place in the 2009 World Championship in Liberec, and finished fourth at the 2005 Winter Universiade.

She made her debut in the Continental Cup, the then highest level in women's ski jumping, in March 2004 with a fourth place in Park City. Jahr has finished among the top three 26 times in single's and team events, with four wins and sevem second places. She started in the FIS Ski Jumping World Cup for women since its installation at december 3rd 2011. Jahr retired in 2017.

In 2024 she became assistent coach of the US women's national team alongside head coach Trevor Edlund.

She represents the club Vikersund IF.
