= Sabrina Windmüller =

Swiss ski jumper

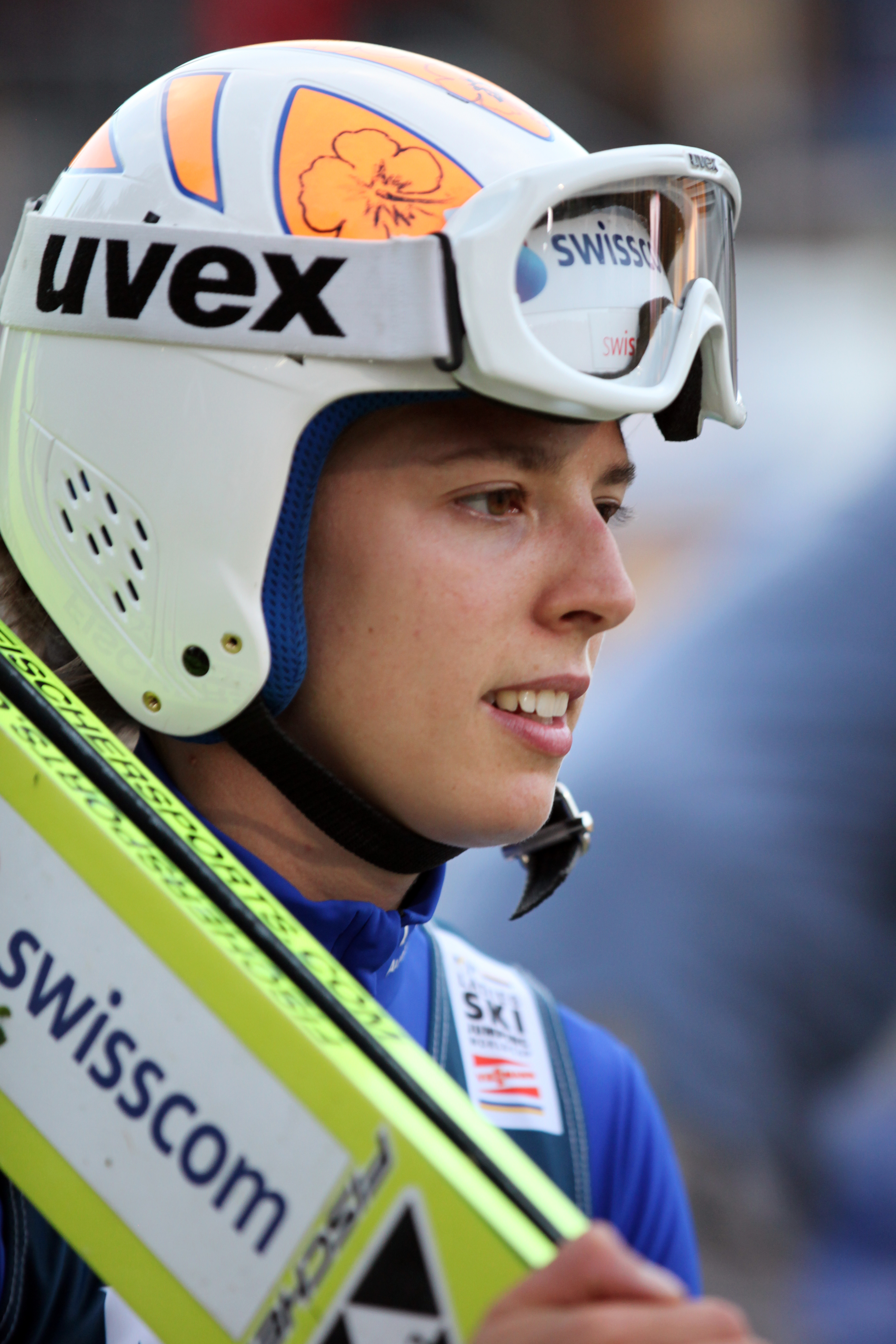

Personal information
- Nationality: Switzerland
- Born: 13 October 1987 (age 38) Walenstadt, Switzerland
- Height: 1.71 m (5 ft 7 1/2 in)

Sport
- Sport: Skiing
- Club: SSC Toggenburg

World Cup career
- Seasons: 2012; 2014–2017
- Indiv. starts: 46
- Indiv. podiums: 1
- Indiv. wins: 1
- Team starts: 2
- Updated on 25 March 2018

Sabrina Windmüller (born 13 October 1987) is a female Swiss former ski jumper.

== Career ==
She is the first winner in history of Ladies' World Cup ski jumping. She took 1st place in World Cup on 7 January 2012 in Hinterzarten on the normal hill.

== World Cup ==
=== Standings ===
Season	Overall	L3
2011/12	20	N/A
2012/13	—	N/A
2013/14	46	N/A
2014/15	43	N/A
2015/16	53	N/A
2016/17	—	N/A

=== Wins ===
No.	Season	Date	Location	Hill	Size
1	2011/12	7 January 2012	(Germany) Hinterzarten	Rothaus-Schanze HS108	NH
