= Wolverine and the X-Men =

Wolverine and the X-Men may refer to:

- Wolverine and the X-Men (comics)
- Wolverine and the X-Men (TV series)

== See also ==
- Wolverine (disambiguation)
- X-Men (disambiguation)
