= Wolverine (disambiguation) =

A wolverine is a stocky and muscular carnivorous mammal that resembles a small bear.

Wolverine may also refer to:

== Places ==
=== Canada ===
- Rural Municipality of Wolverine No. 340, Saskatchewan
- Wolverine Pass, a mountain pass in British Columbia
- Wolverine Range, a small mountain range in British Columbia
- Wolverine Formation, a geological formation in central Yukon

=== United States ===
- Wolverine, Kentucky, an unincorporated community
- Wolverine, Michigan, a village
- Michigan, the "Wolverine State", one of the United States
- Wolverine Canyon, near Boulder, Utah
- Wolverine Creek, a stream in Kansas
- Wolverine Hill, Ironwood, Michigan, a former ski jumping hill
- Wolverine Mine, a mine (1882–1925) in Calumet Township, Michigan

== People ==
- Jeff Hardy, professional wrestler, who uses the ring name "Wolverine"
- Hugo Viana (fighter), Brazilian mixed martial artist, nicknamed "Wolverine"
- Chris Benoit, Canadian professional wrestler, nicknamed "The Rabid Wolverine"

== Arts, entertainment, and media ==
=== Marvel Comics media ===
- Wolverine (character), a Marvel Comics character
  - Wolverine (Ultimate Marvel character), Ultimate version of the character
  - Old Man Logan, alternate future version of the character
  - Logan (film character), a primary protagonist of the X-Men film series
  - X-23 or Laura Kinney, a Marvel Comics character and daughter of the original Wolverine who also uses the name Wolverine
  - Daken or Akihiro, another Marvel Comics character and son of the original Wolverine who has used the name Wolverine
  - Jimmy Hudson, another Marvel Comics character and son of the Ultimate Wolverine who has used the name Wolverine
- Wolverine (comic book), featuring the Marvel Comics character
- Wolverine (1991 video game), based on the character
- The Wolverine (film), 2013, based on the Marvel Comics character
- X-Men Origins: Wolverine, a 2009 film based on the Marvel Comics character
  - X-Men Origins: Wolverine (video game), based on the 2009 film
- Wolverine (TV series), a 2011 anime TV series
- Logan (film), 2017, based on the Marvel Comics character
- Wolverine (podcast), a 2018–2019 audio drama
- Marvel's Wolverine, a 2026 video game based on the Marvel Comics character

=== Other characters ===
- Wolverines, the teenagers' militia in the film Red Dawn and its 2012 reboot

=== Music ===
- Wolverine (band), a Swedish progressive metal band
- The Wolverines (rock band), an Australian country rock band
- The Wolverines (jazz band) or Wolverines Orchestra, an American jazz band led by Bix Beiderbecke
- Wolverines (album), 2014, by I Am the Avalanche

=== Other uses in entertainment ===
- Wolverine, a Hasbro G.I. Joe toy vehicle
- The Wolverine (1921 film), an American silent Western

== Brands and enterprises ==
- Whitney Wolverine, a lightweight, semiautomatic pistol
- Wolverine Hotel (Detroit), a former hotel in Detroit
- Wolverine World Wide, a manufacturer of work boots and leather products, including Wolverine brand boots

== Sport ==
=== College sports ===
- Grove City College Wolverines
- Michigan Wolverines, the sports teams of the University of Michigan
- Utah Valley Wolverines, the athletic teams of Utah Valley University

=== American football ===
- Detroit Wolverines (NFL), a professional football team that played in the 1928 season
- Helsinki Wolverines, a Finnish American-football team
- Lancashire Wolverines, a British American-football team based in Blackburn, England
- Mount Carmel Wolverines, a professional football team based in Mount Carmel, Pennsylvania, that played in 1926

=== Ice hockey ===
- Halifax Wolverines, a senior men's amateur ice hockey team based in Halifax, Nova Scotia, Canada, winners of the 1935 Allan Cup
- Halifax Wolverines, original name of the Bridgewater Lumberjacks, a Junior "A" ice hockey team now based in Bridgewater, Nova Scotia, Canada
- Waywayseecappo Wolverines, a Junior "A" ice hockey team based in Waywayseecappo, Manitoba, Canada
- Whitecourt Wolverines, a Junior "A" ice hockey team based in Whitecourt
- Whitecourt Wolverines (2008–2012), a former Junior "B" ice hockey team based in Whitecourt, Alberta, Canada

=== Other sports ===
- Canada national rugby league team, the national team for Canada in rugby league, nicknamed the Wolverines
- Detroit Wolverines, a Major League Baseball team in the 1880s, winners of the 1887 national championship
- Wolverine Open, an LPGA Tour golf tournament played intermittently from 1955 to 1963 in the Detroit area

== Transportation ==
=== Civilian transport ===
- Wolverine (automobile), a car brand (1927–1928); see List of automobile manufacturers of the United States
- Wolverine (automobile company), a car made by the Reid Manufacturing Company of Detroit from 1904–1905
- Wolverine (motor vessel) (built 1908), which operated in Oregon and California, US
- Wolverine (Amtrak train), a service that runs between Chicago and Pontiac, Michigan, US
- Wolverine (NYC train), a New York Central train the ran between New York and Chicago via Southwestern Ontario
- Washington T-411 Wolverine, an American homebuilt aircraft design
- Wolverine Air, a charter airline based in the Northwest Territories, Canada

=== Military vehicles ===
- AT-6B Wolverine, an armed variant of the Beechcraft T-6 Texan II trainer aircraft
- HMS Wolverine, six ships of the Royal Navy to bear the name
- KTO Rosomak (Polish: Wheeled Armored Vehicle "Wolverine"), a Polish 8x8 multi-role military vehicle
- M10 tank destroyer, often known by the unofficial post-war name "Wolverine"
- M104 Wolverine, a bridge-laying vehicle
- USS Wolverine, two US Navy vessels

== Other uses ==
- .277 Wolverine, a wildcat rifle cartridge based on the 5.56×45mm NATO case
- TCP/IP Stack for Windows for Workgroups 3.11 (codename "Wolverine")
- Michigan Brigade, also called the Wolverines, a cavalry unit commanded by George Armstrong Custer during the American Civil War

== See also ==
- Wolverine 1 (disambiguation)
- Wolverine 2 (disambiguation)
