= List of surviving Vought F4U Corsairs =

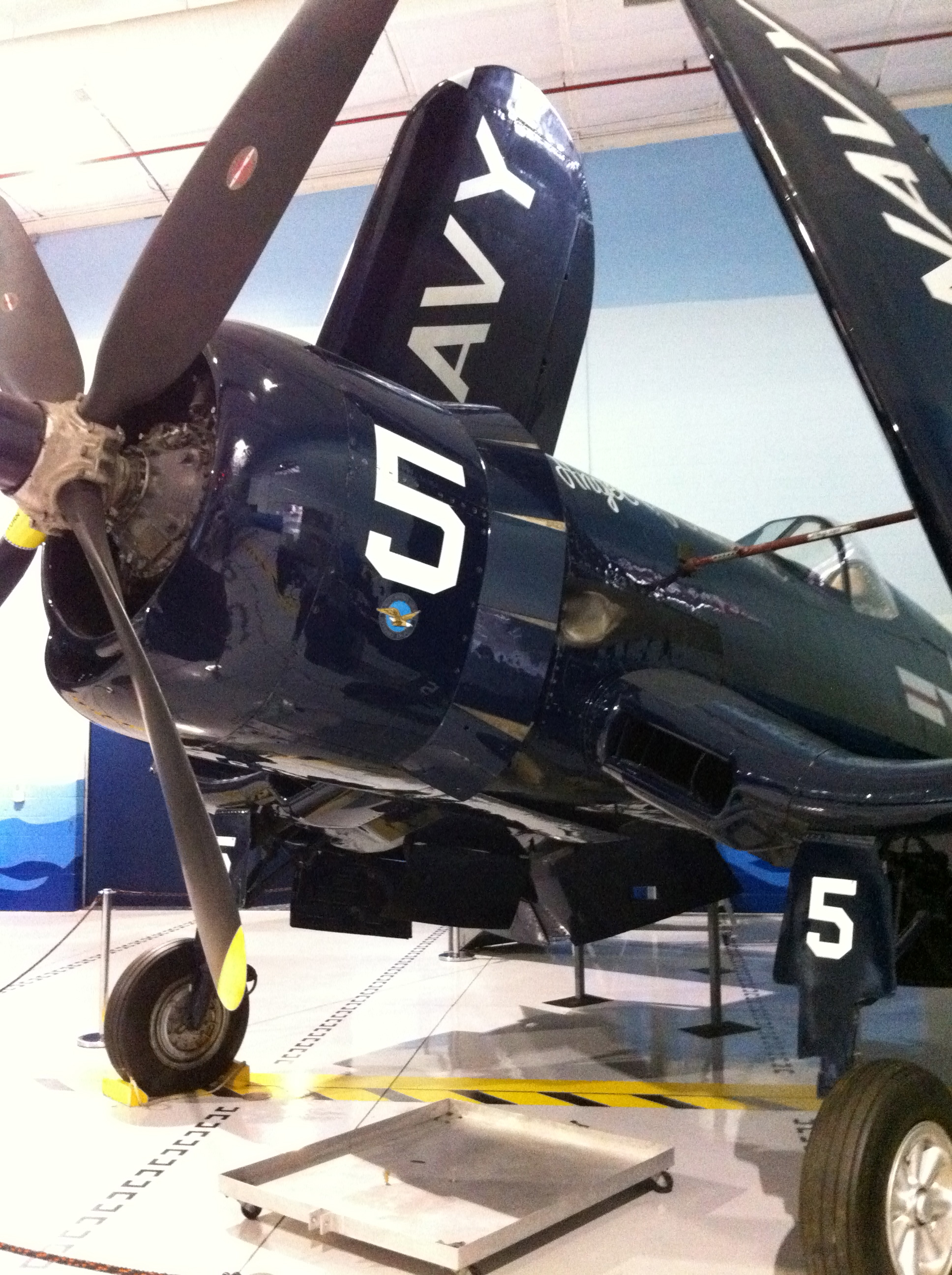
F4U-4 at Fantasy of Flight in Polk City, Florida

This list of surviving Vought F4U Corsairs by country location includes information about the aircraft, including model number, bureau number, fuselage markings, location within the country, and status (airworthy, on display, and in restoration).

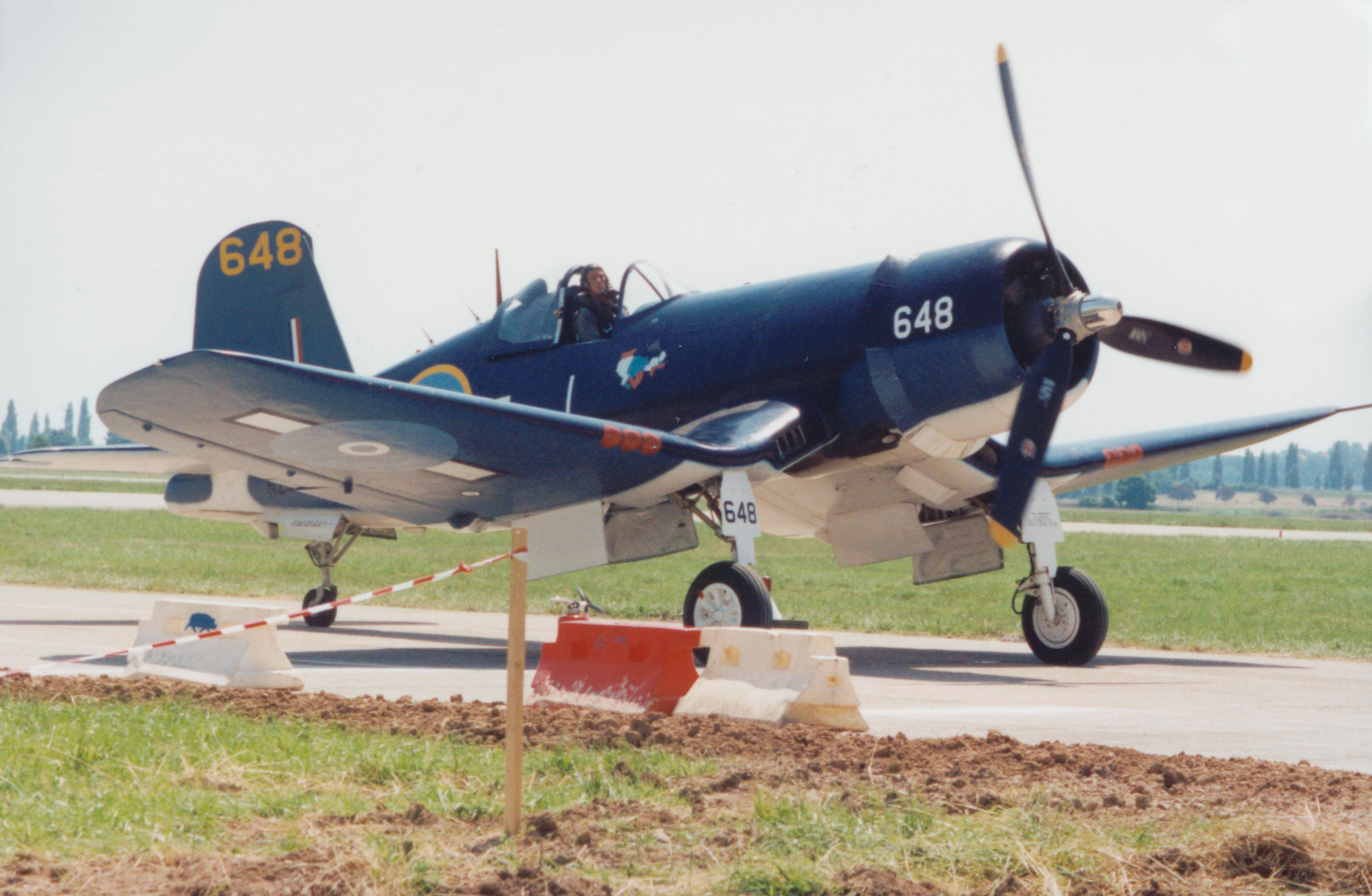
FG-1D 92044 coded 648 of the Old Stick & Rudder Company

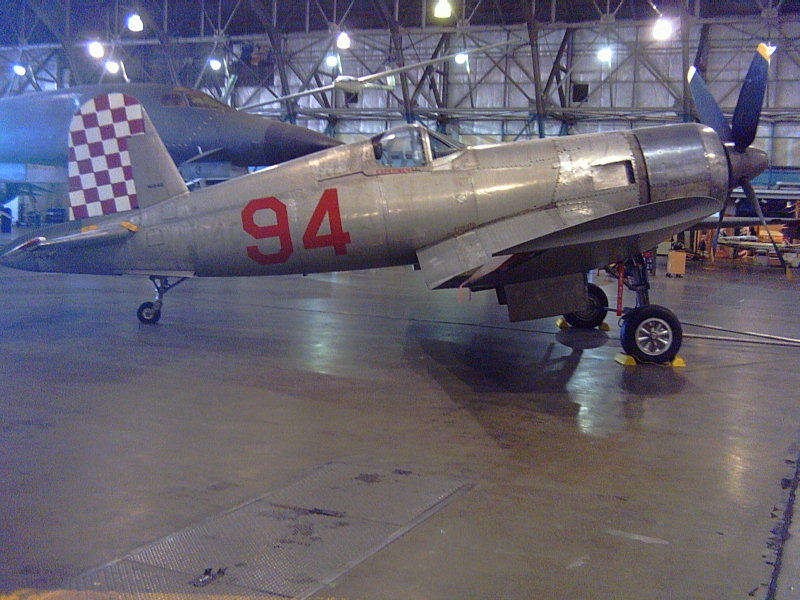
FG-1D 92050 coded 94 was airworthy, previously with the Wings Over the Rockies Museum, returned to original owner in 2013

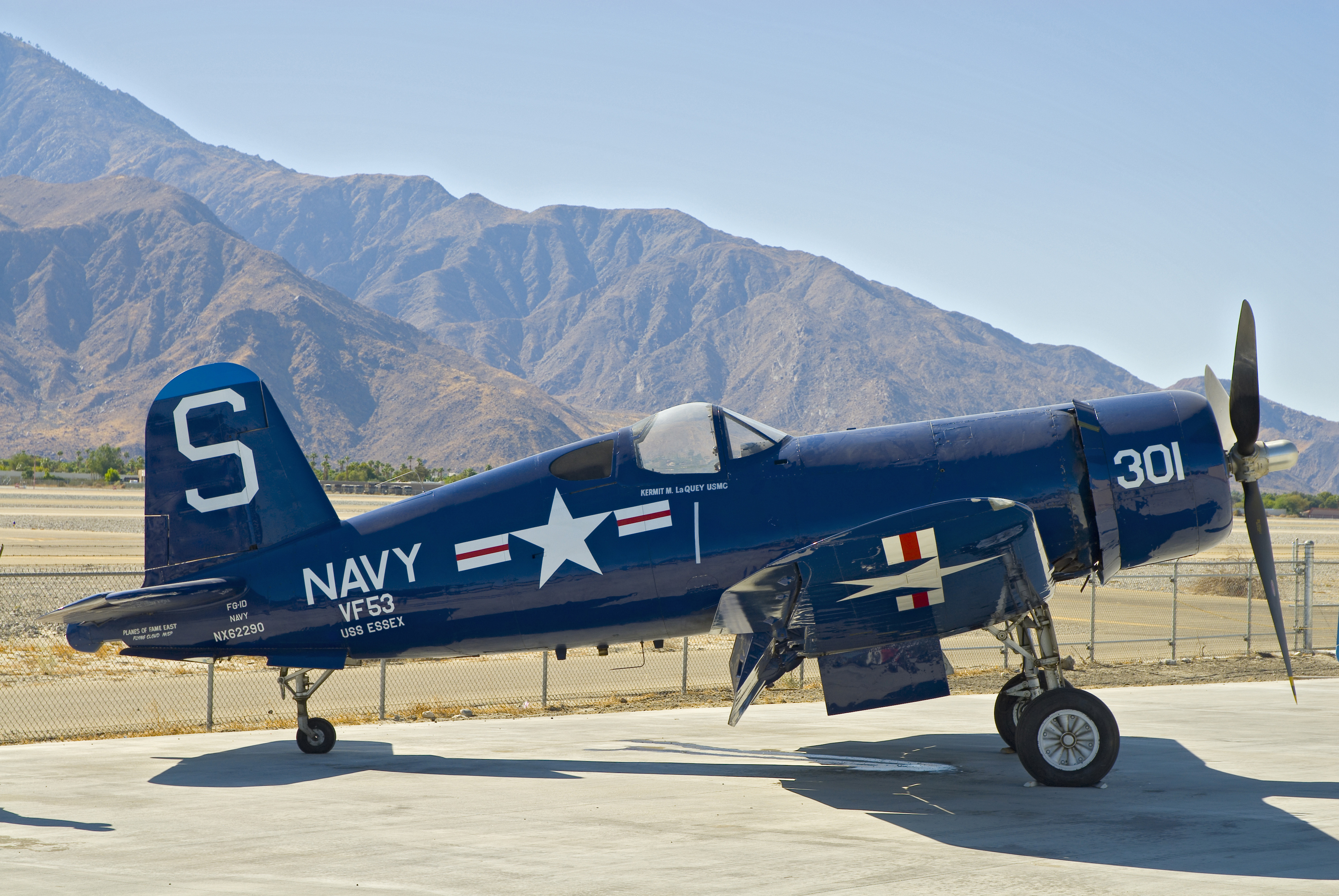
FG-1D 92629 coded S-301 of the Palm Springs Museum

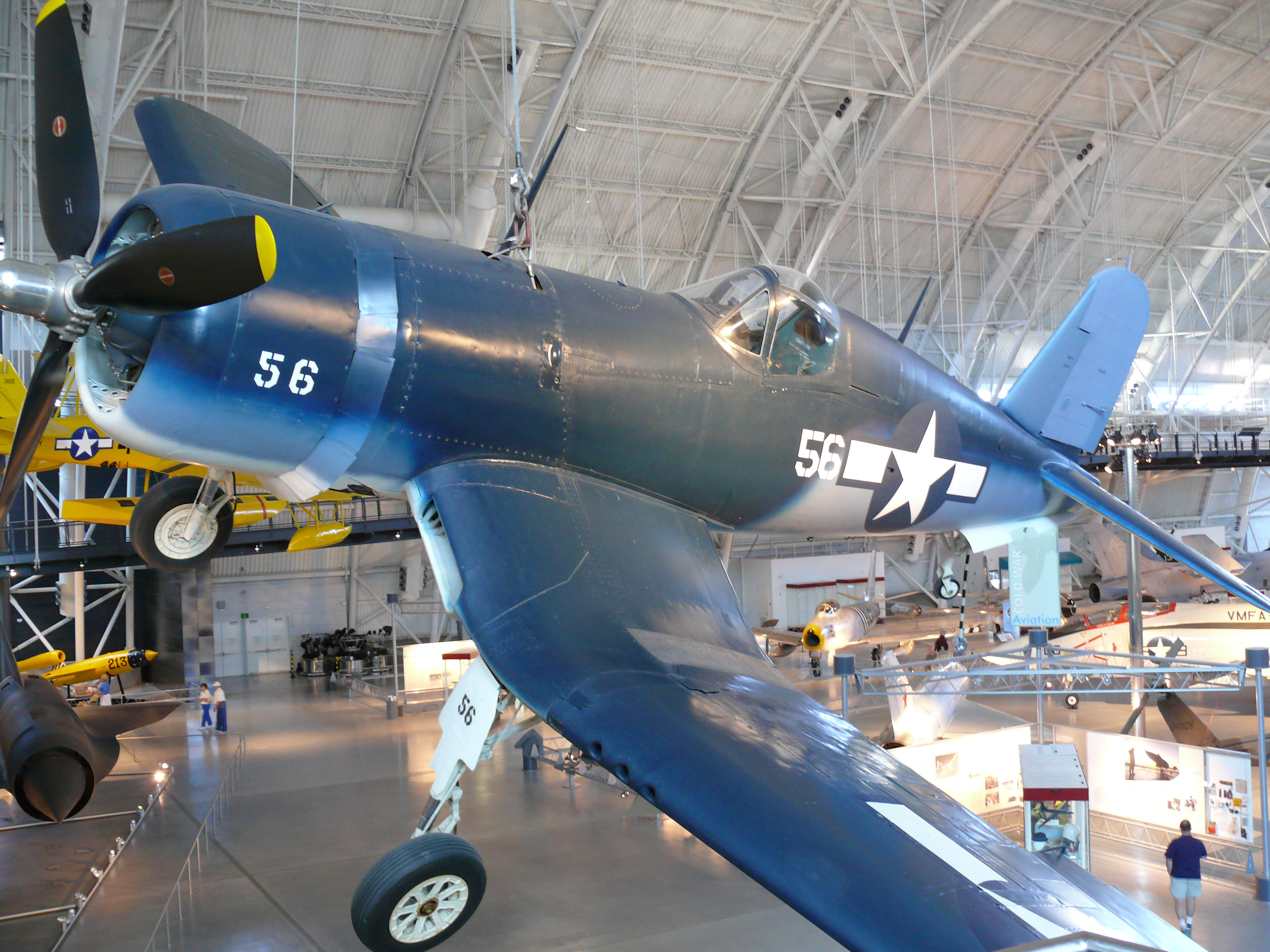
F4U-1D 50375 coded 56 at the NASM-Steven F. Udvar-Hazy Center

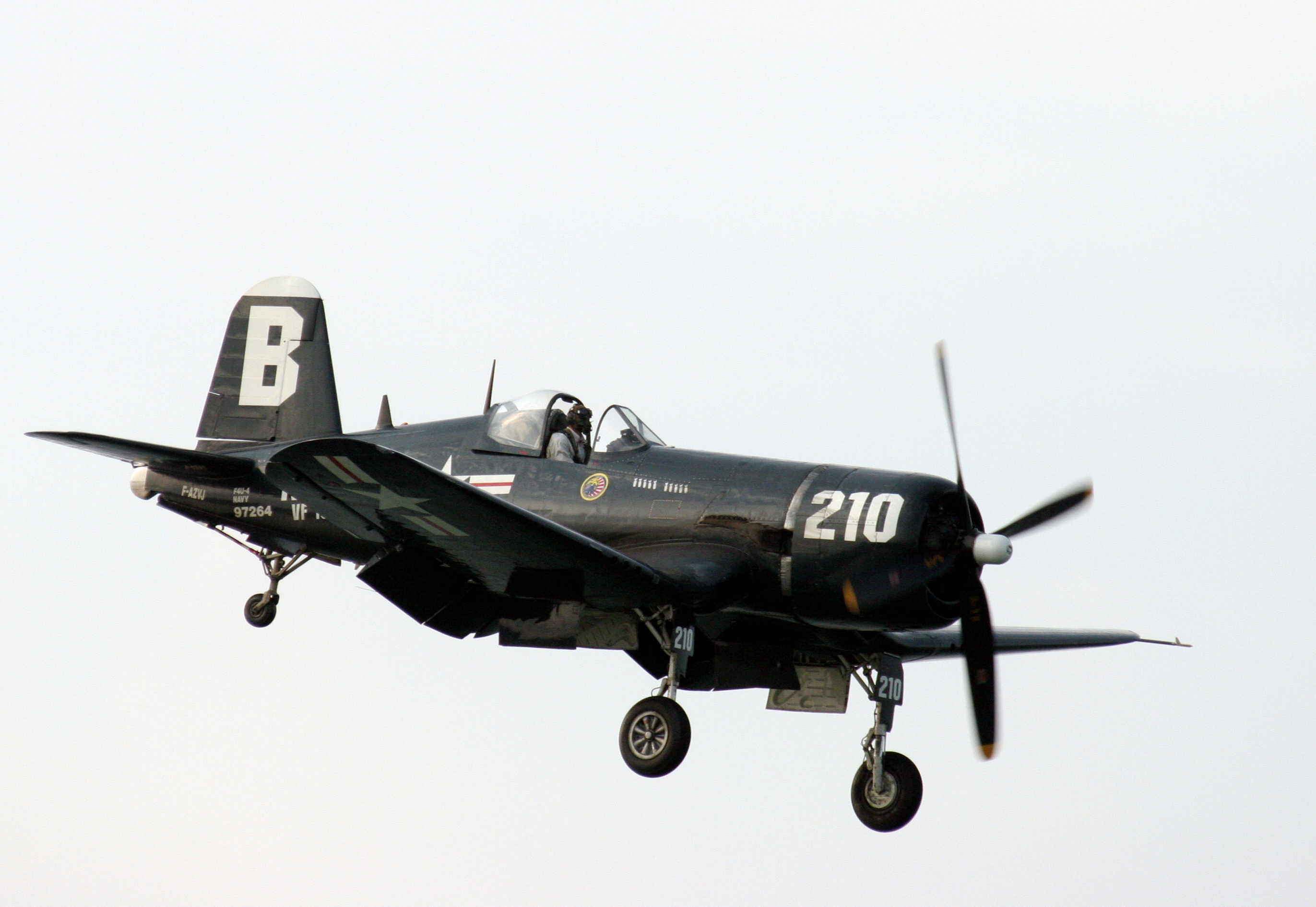
F4U-4 97264 coded B 210 of VF-192 owned by Dan Friedkin

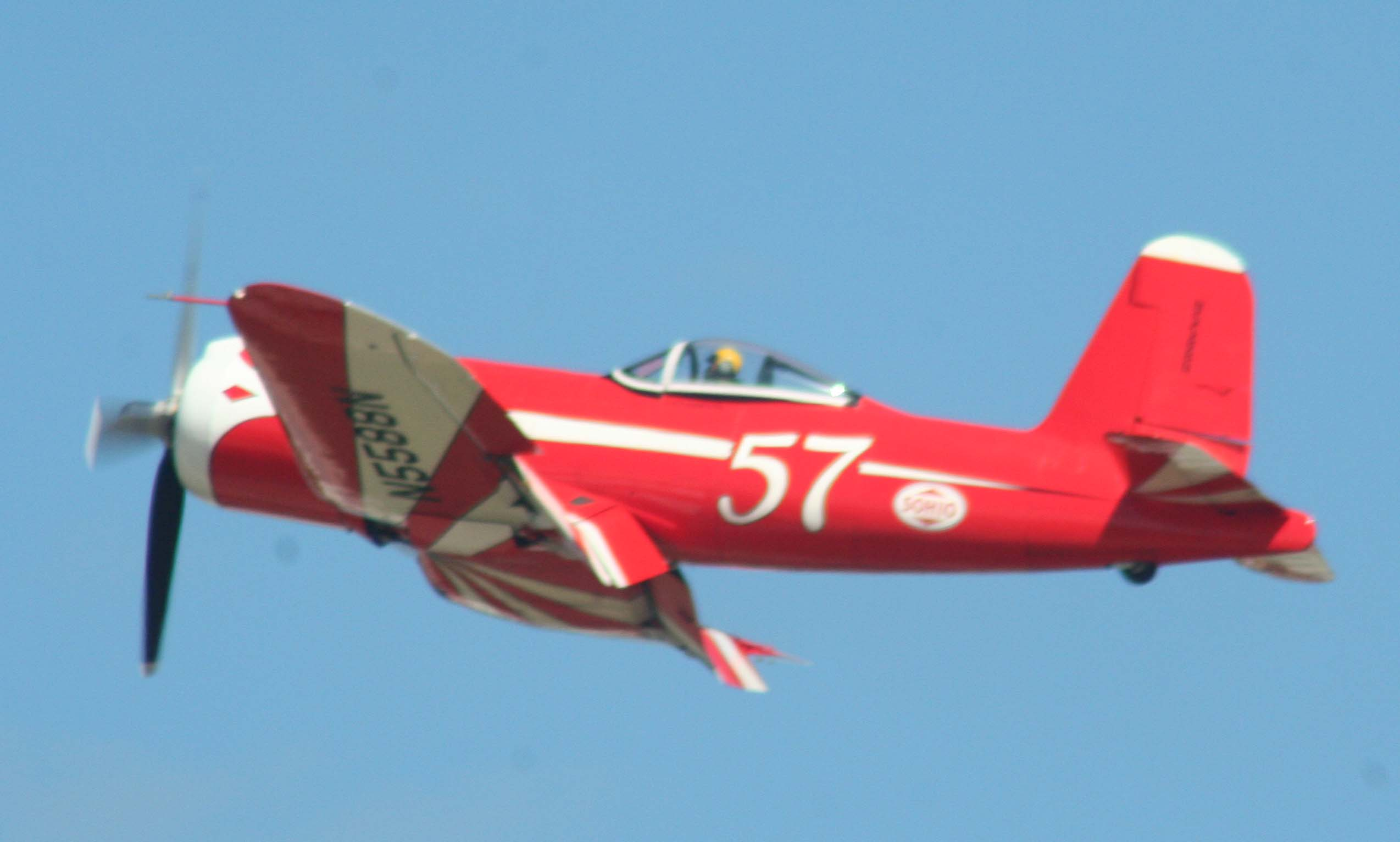
F2G-1 88458 coded 57

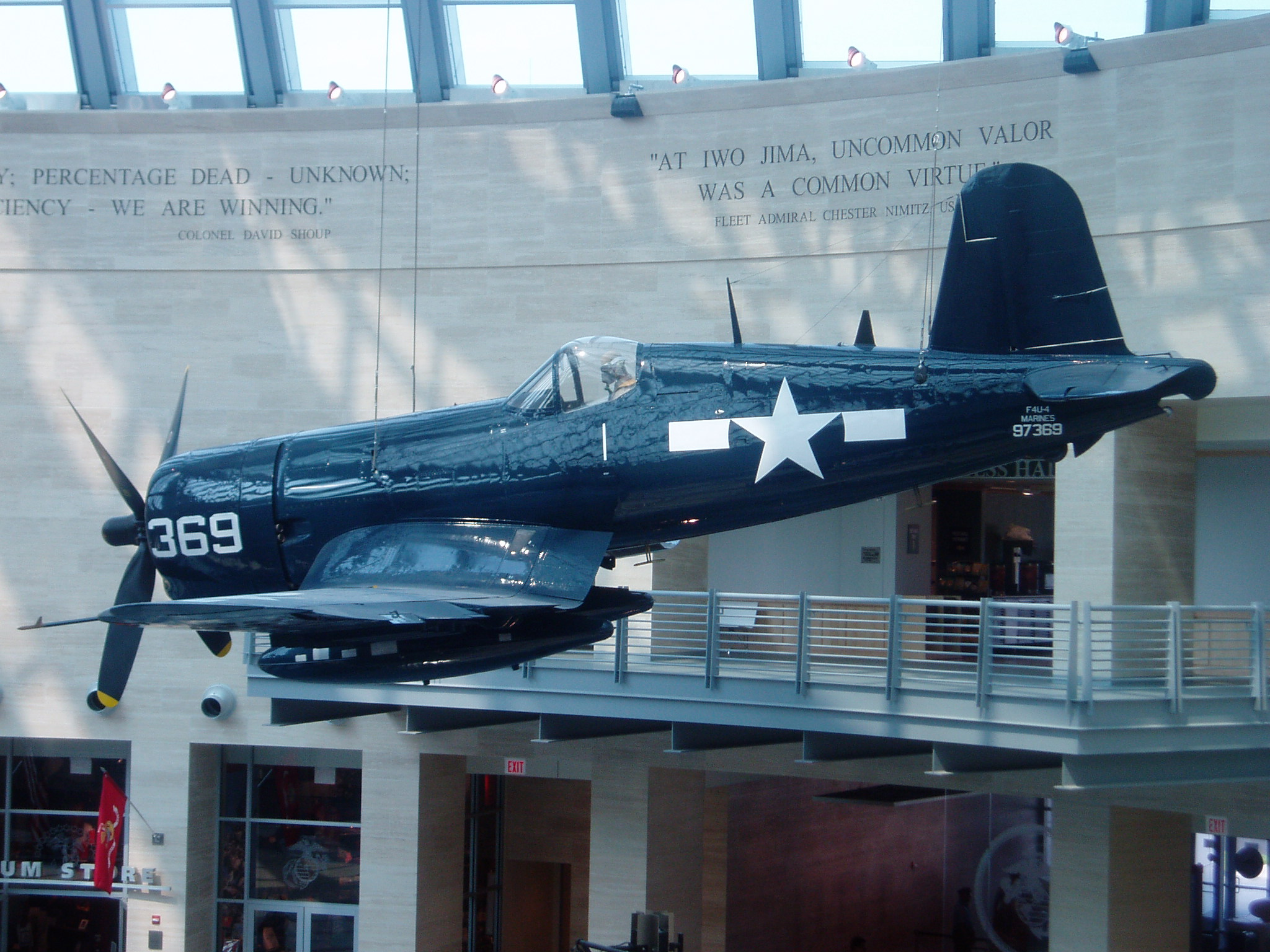
F4U-4 97369 at the National Museum of the Marine Corps

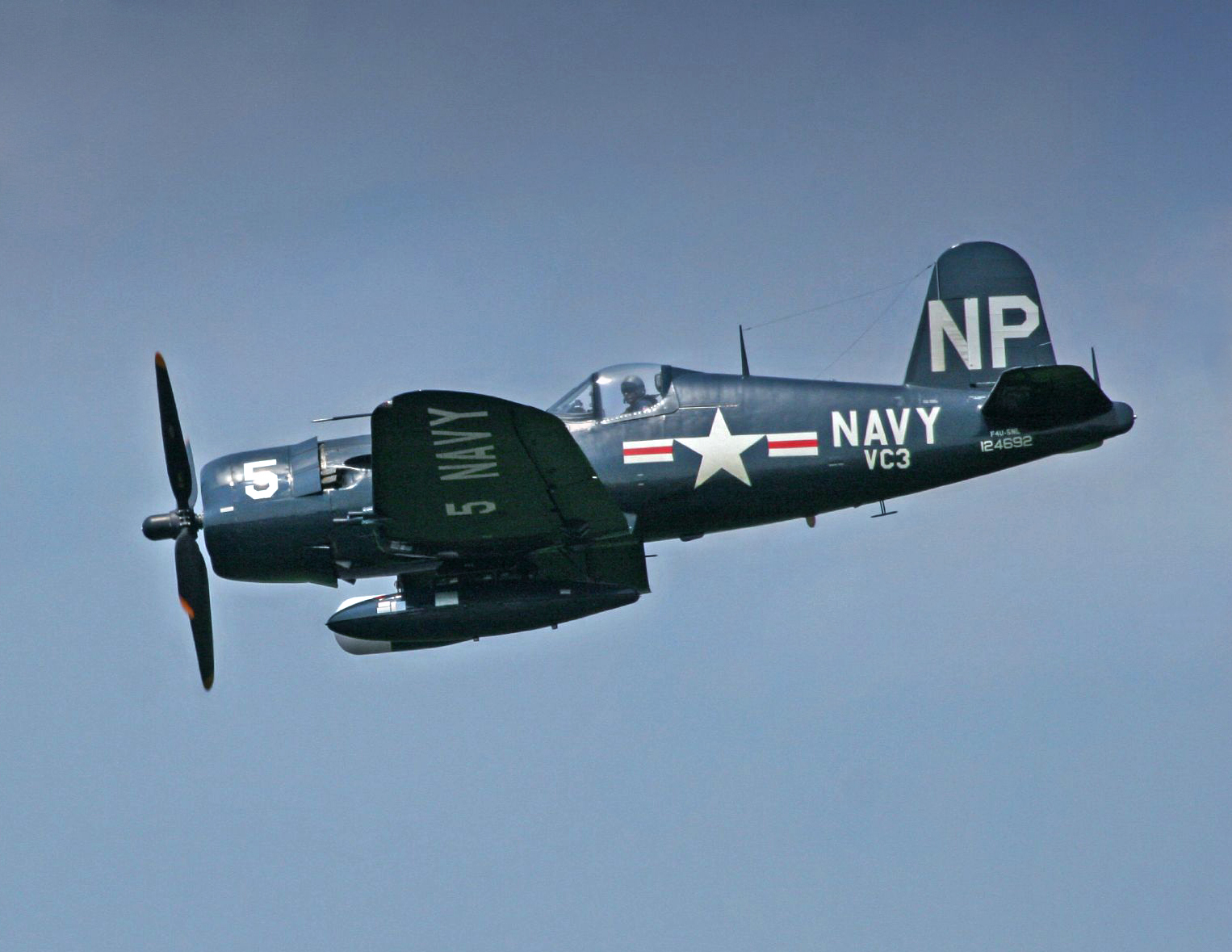
F4U-5N 124692 coded NP 5 of the Collings Foundation

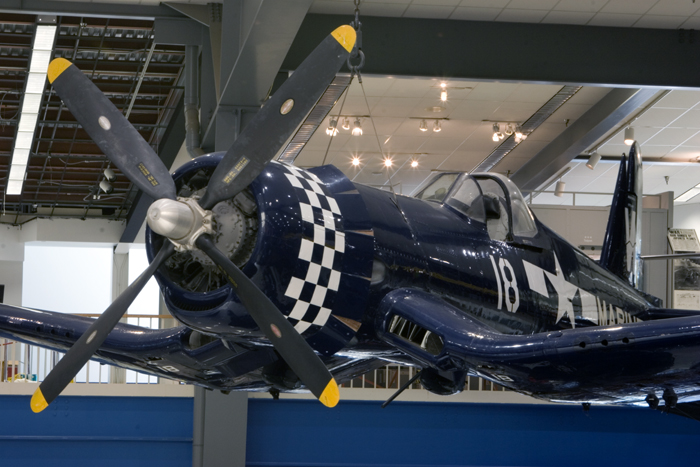
F4U-4 97142 coded WR 18 at the National Museum of Naval Aviation

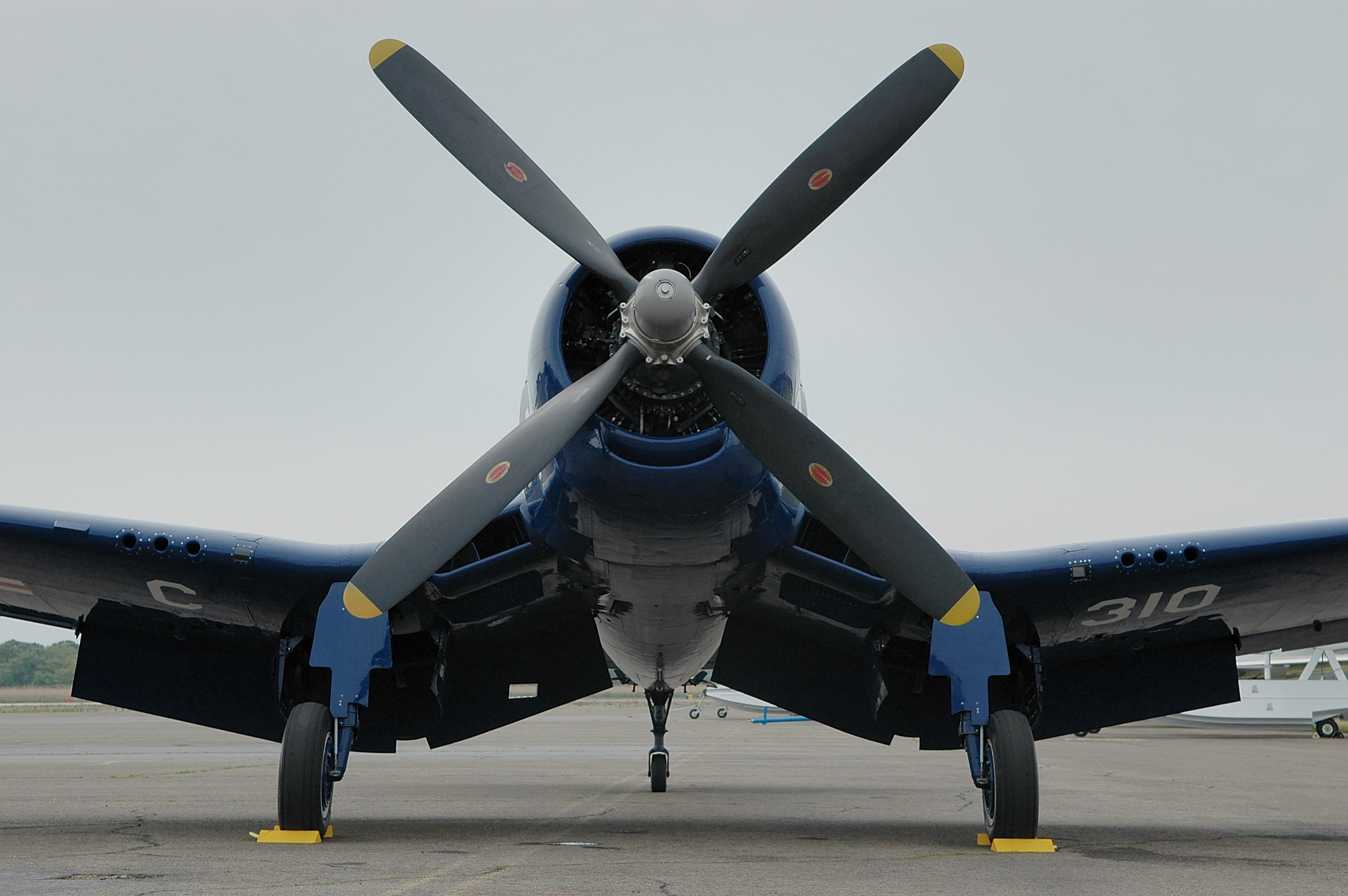
F4U-4 97388 coded C 310 at the Fargo Air Museum

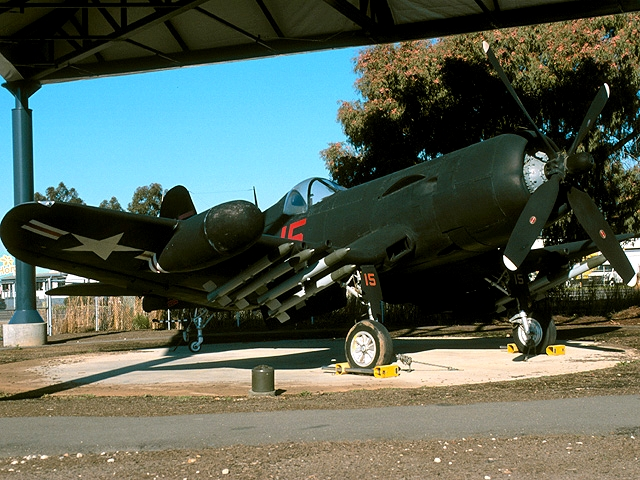
F4U 122189 coded WF-15 of the Flying Leathernecks Museum

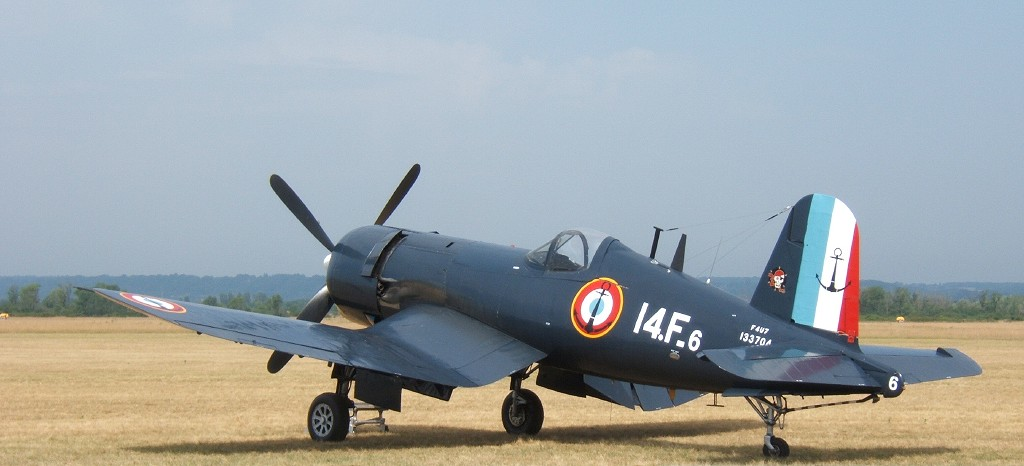
F4U 124541 coded 14.F.6 of Les Ailes de l'Aero

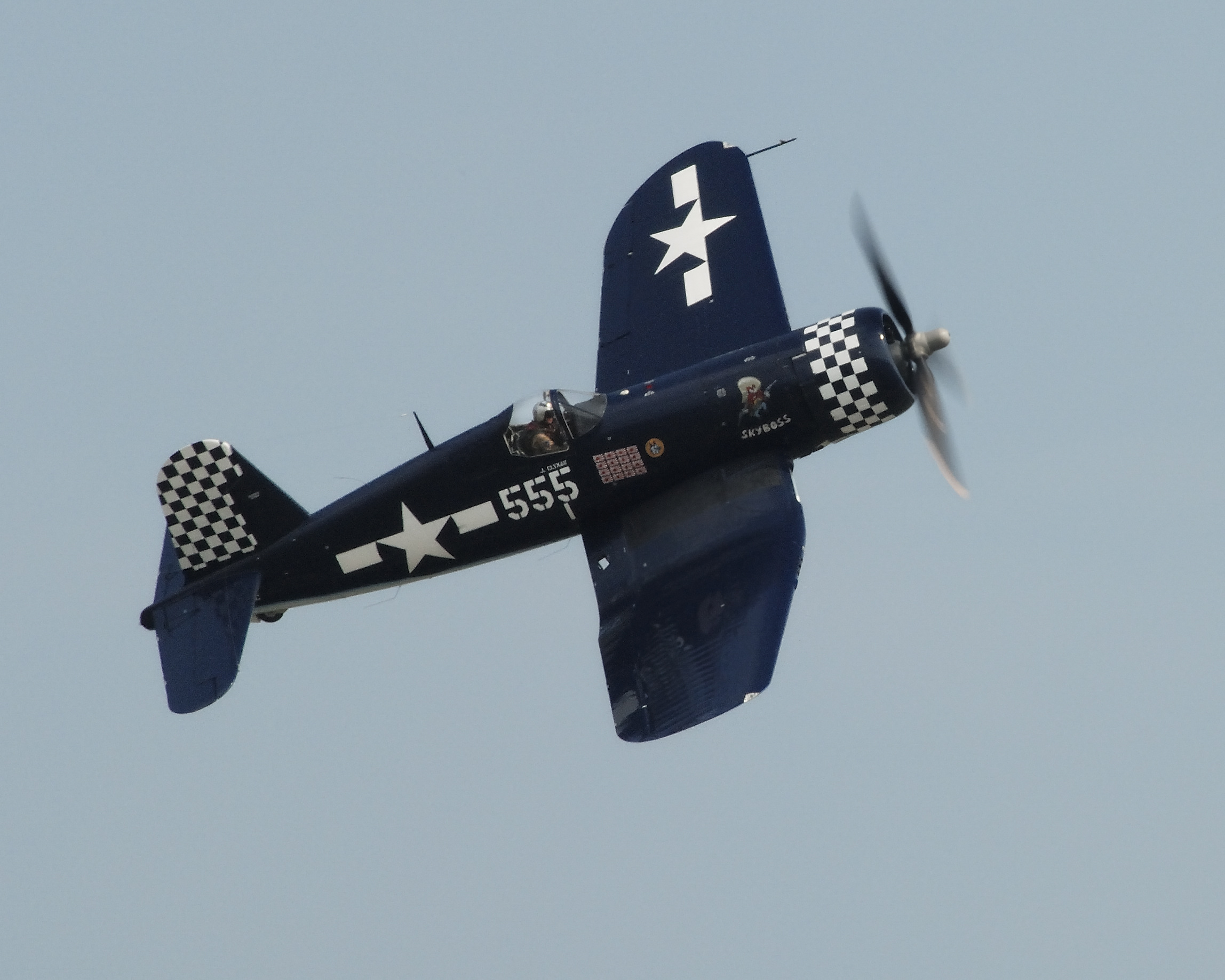
FG-1D 67089 coded 555 and named Sky Boss at the American Heritage Museum

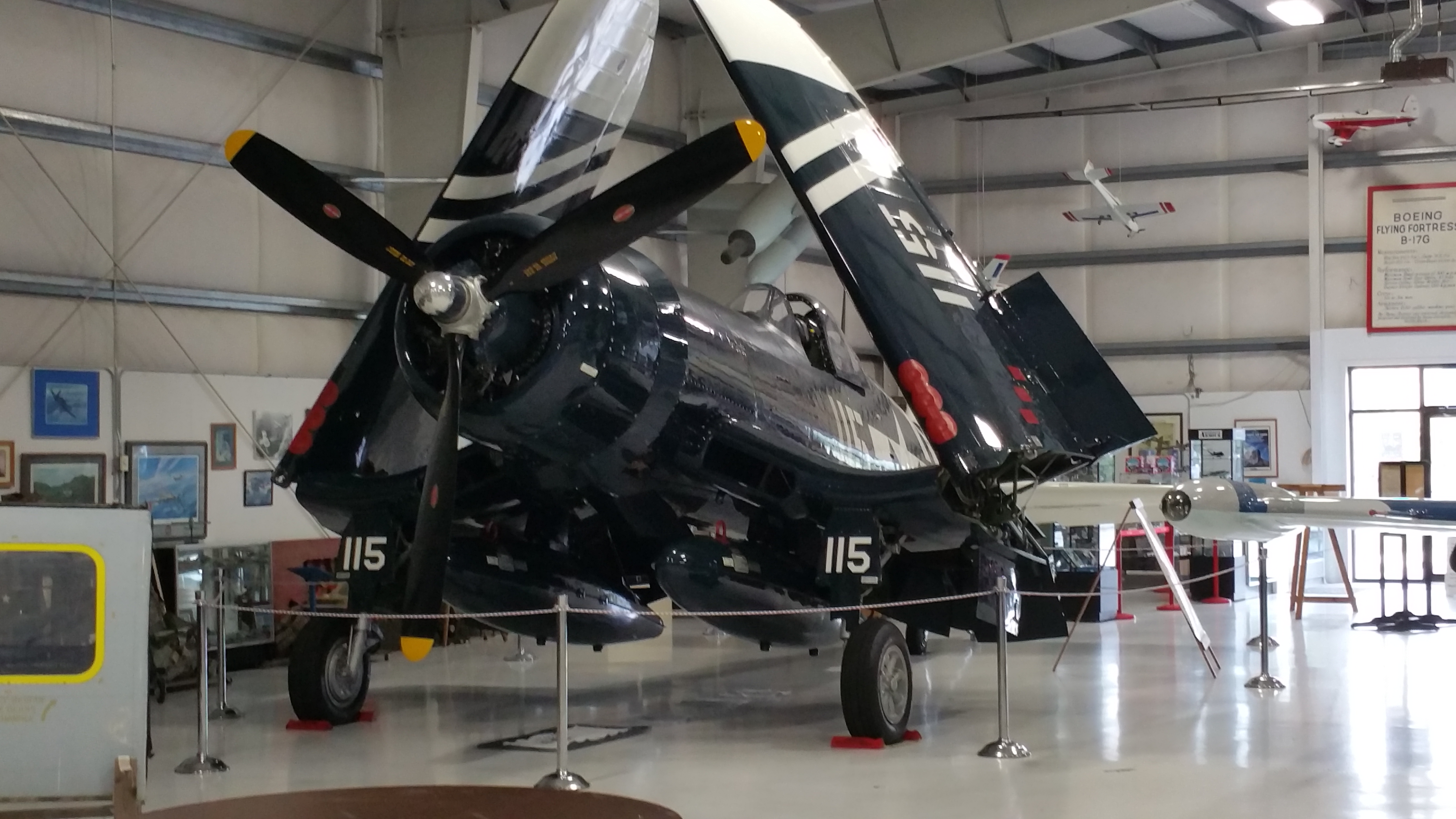
FG-1D Olympic Flight Museum 2014

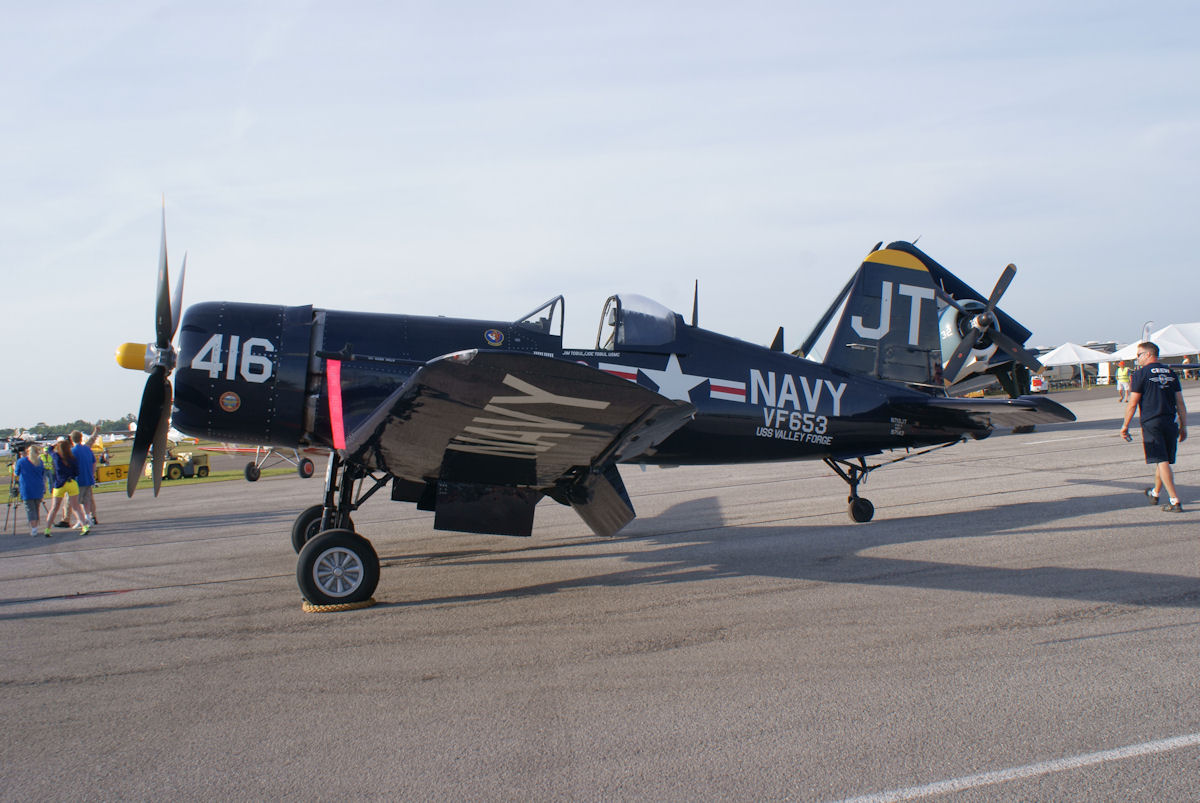
F4U-4 97143 'Korean War Hero'

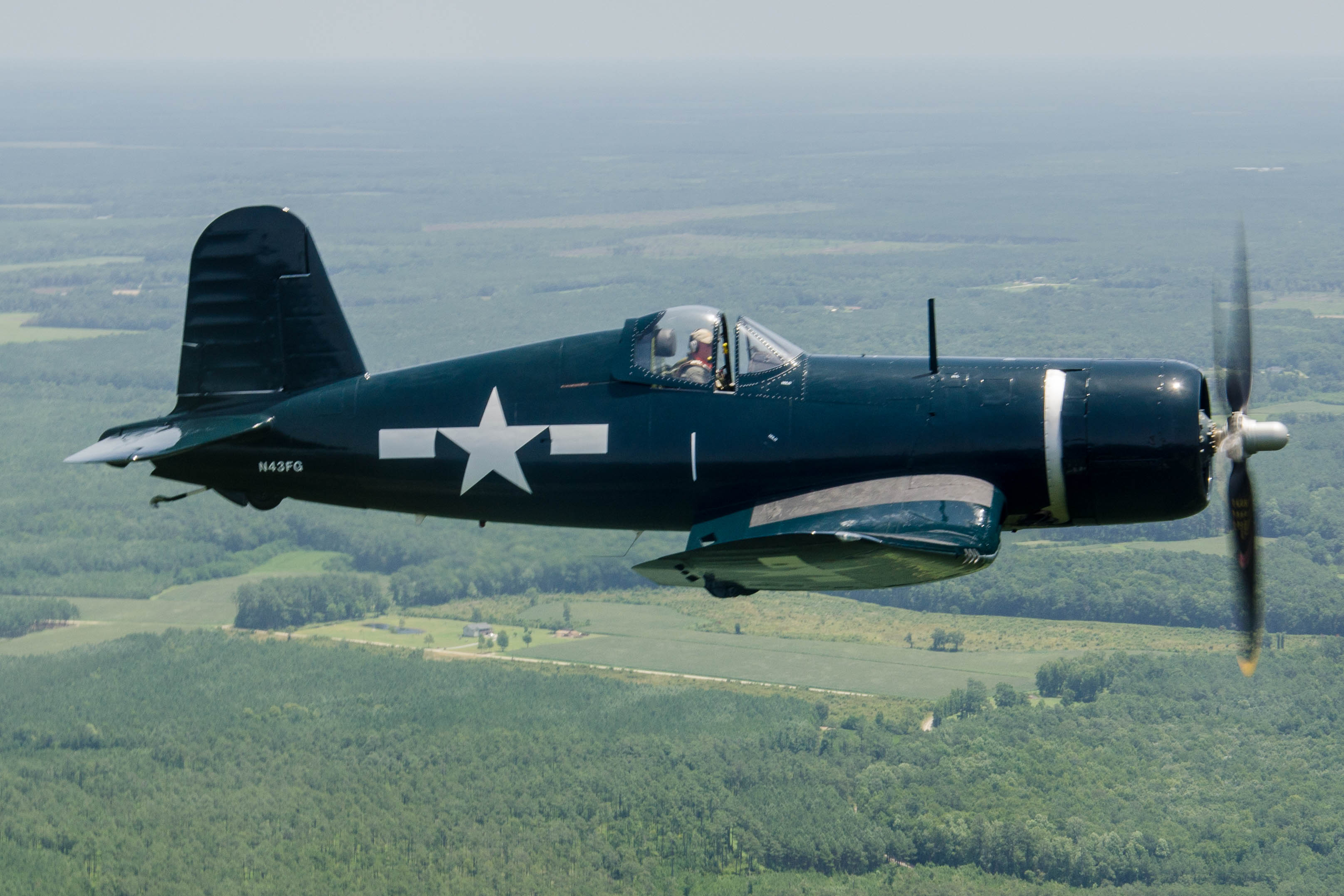
FG-1D 88090 ex-RNZAF 5612

== Surviving aircraft ==
=== Argentina ===
On display

F4U-5

- 121928 – Museo de Aviacion Naval, Bahia Blanca NAS.

=== Australia ===
Airworthy

F4U-1D

- 82640 – Chance Vought-built in 1944, served on USS Intrepid. Completed its first post-restoration flight on February 28, 2022, after a lengthy restoration.

F4U-5

- 124493/VH-III – owned by Graham Hosking.

Under restoration

F4U-1

- 02270 – number 124 off of the production line, is under static restoration at Classic Jet Fighter Museum in Parafield, South Australia.

=== Austria ===
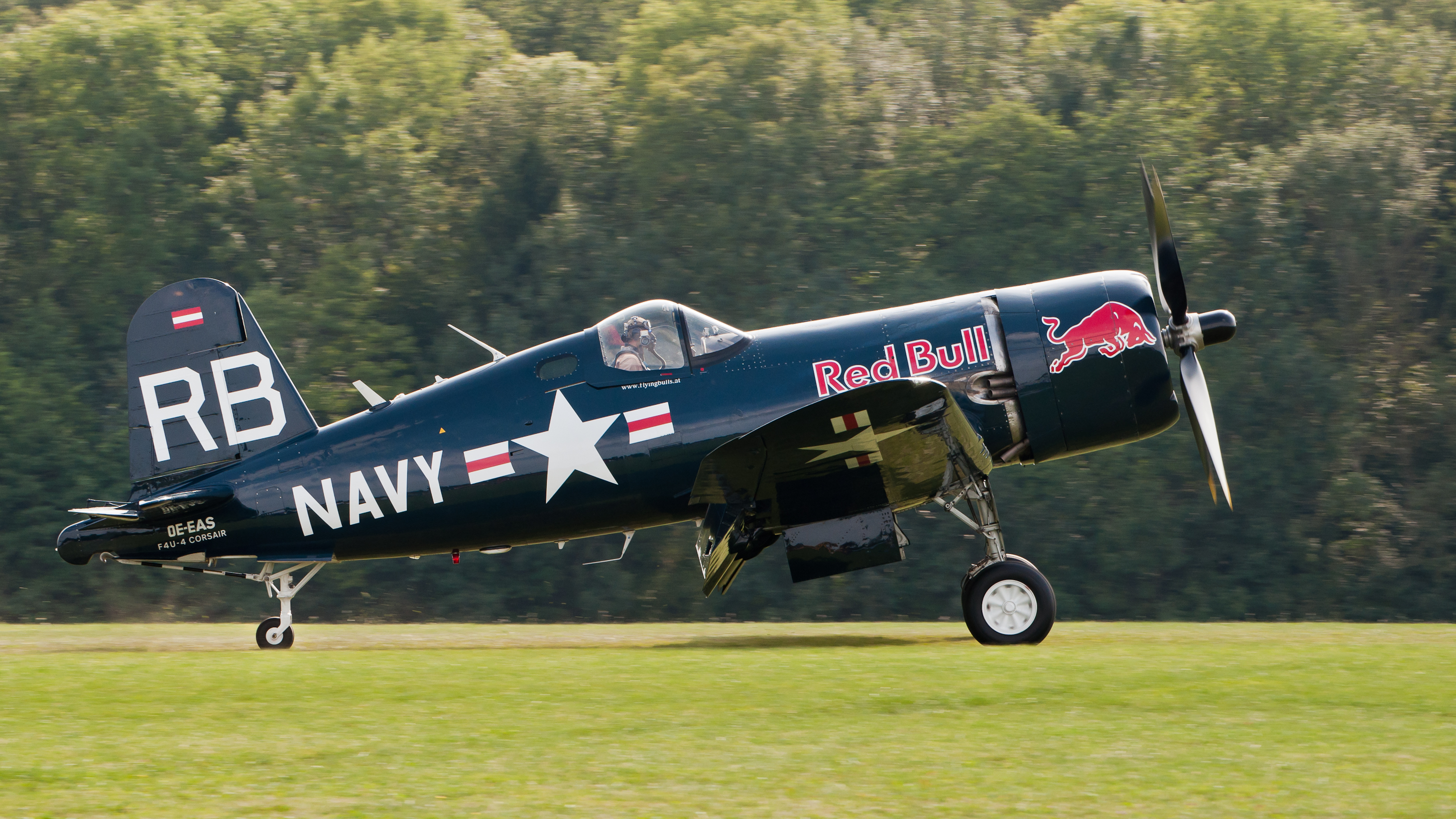
F4U-4 Corsair 96995 sponsored by Red Bull

Airworthy

F4U-4

- 96995 – Tyrolean Jet Service in Salzburg & Innsbruck, sponsored by Red Bull.

=== Brazil ===
On display

F4U-1A

- 17995 – F4U-1A restored as an F4U-1 Birdcage Corsair at the Museu Aeroespacial Paulista, Campo de Marte Airport, São Paulo.

=== Canada ===
Airworthy

FG-1

- 92106 – Vintage Wings of Canada, Gatineau, Québec. It was one of eight Corsairs to appear in the 1970s NBC series Baa Baa Black Sheep (later renamed Black Sheep Squadron). It appeared in all 35 episodes (now in the colours of Robert Hampton Gray (KD658)). On 3 July 2019 the plane was damaged when it left the runway while landing at Gatineau Airport. The pilot, John Aitken, a veteran RCAF fighter pilot, was hospitalized with a broken rib and nose. Paul Tremblay, the chief mechanic at Vintage Wings of Canada was optimistic about the condition of the plane and stated "we’ll definitely be able to get it going again". The aircraft is currently offered for sale on consignment by Platinum Fighter Sales in a damaged state as of Oct 31st, 2022.

=== France ===
Airworthy

F4U-5

- 124724 – Salis Collection in La Ferte-Alais.

=== Germany ===
Airworthy

F4U-5NL

- 124541 "Devotion" (D-FCOR) – Flying Legends GmbH at Burbach, Siegerland Airport (EDGS)

=== Honduras ===
Under restoration

F4U-5

- 124715 (FAH-609) – Museo del Aire de Honduras, Tegucigalpa AB.

This Vought F4U Corsair with registration FAH-609 Air Force of Honduras, shot down three aircraft: a Cavalier F-51D Mustang and two Goodyear FG-1D Corsairs of the Salvadoran Air Force 17 July 1969, commanding by Captain Fernando Soto Henriquez. This was the last combat between piston engined aircraft.

=== New Zealand ===
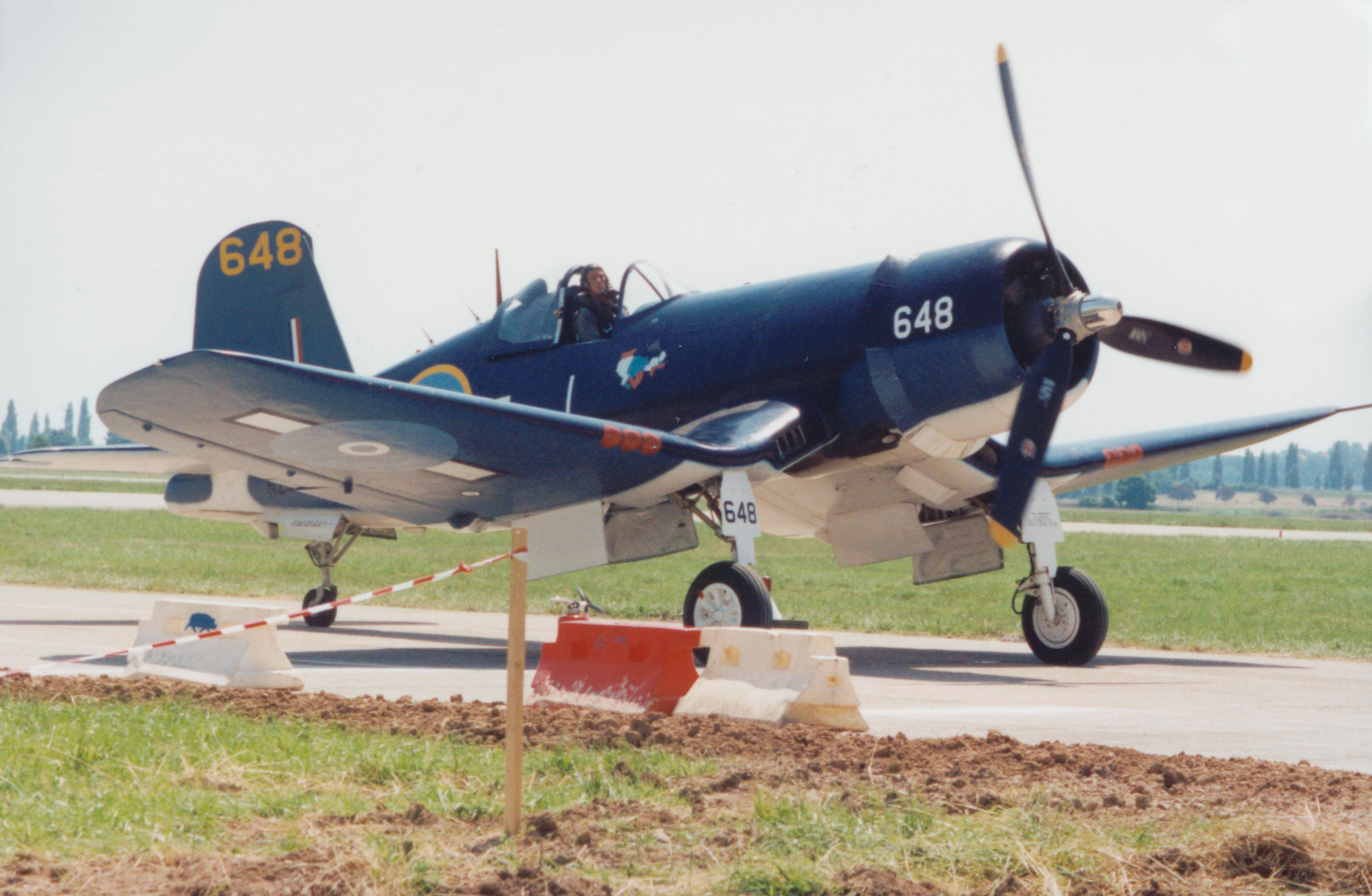
FG-1D NZ5648

Airworthy

FG-1D

- 88391/NZ5648/ZK-COR – privately owned by ‘Mike Jones, Auckland.

Under restoration

F4U-1

- 56429 / NZ5245 project in Auckland
- 10508 – sold overseas not in NZ under restoration by Ross Jowitt in Ardmore, Auckland.
- 50000 – sold overseas not in NZ under restoration by Ross Jowitt in Ardmore, Auckland.

=== South Korea ===
On display

F4U-4

- 81415 – KAI Aerospace Museum in Sacheon.

=== United Kingdom ===
Airworthy

FG-1

- 88297 – The Fighter Collection in Duxford.

On display

FG-1

- 14862 – Fleet Air Arm Museum in Yeovilton.

FG-1D N11Y owned by Gary Heck of Santa Rosa California. Korbel Champagne Corsair flown by Will Whiteside photo by Scott Slocum.

=== United States ===
CORSAIR N11Y owned by Gary Heck over the Pacific flown by Will Whiteside Photo by Scott Slocum. Photo ship Beech Baron flown by John Maloney.

Airworthy

F3A-1

- 04634 – based at the National Museum of World War II Aviation in Colorado Springs, Colorado.

F4U-1A

- 17799 – based at Planes of Fame in Chino, California. It saw combat in the Pacific Theater of Operations with the VMF-441 "Blackjacks". One of eight Corsairs to appear in the 1970s NBC series Baa Baa Black Sheep (later renamed Black Sheep Squadron), it debuted in the first episode of season two, "Divine Wind," which aired on December 14, 1977, and appeared in 11 of the season's 13 episodes.

F4U-1C

- 92399 – based at Cavanaugh Flight Museum in Addison, Texas. Removed from public display when the museum indefinitely closed on 1 January 2024. To be moved to North Texas Regional Airport in Denison, Texas.

F4U-4

- 81698 – based at War Eagles Air Museum in Santa Teresa, New Mexico.
- 97143 – also "Korean War Hero", based at the National Museum of World War II Aviation in Colorado Springs, Colorado.
- 97264 – privately owned in Houston, Texas.
- 97286 – based at Fantasy of Flight in Polk City, Florida.
- 97359 – privately owned in Kalispell, Montana. In June/July 1953, while serving with VF-44 "Hornets", it flew combat missions over North Korea while flying from the decks of USS Lake Champlain & Boxer. It was one of eight Corsairs to appear in the 1970s NBC series Baa Baa Black Sheep (later renamed Black Sheep Squadron), appearing in all 35 episodes.
- 97388 – based at Fargo Air Museum in Fargo, North Dakota.

F4U-5N

- 121881 – based at Lone Star Flight Museum in Houston, Texas.
- 124486 – based at Air Combat Museum in Springfield, Illinois.

F4U-5NL

- 124560 – privately owned in Ketchum, Idaho.
- 124692 – based at Collings Foundation in Stow, Massachusetts.

F4U-5P

- 122184 – based at Stonehenge Air Museum in Lincoln County, Montana.

F4U-7

- 133710 – privately owned by John O'Connor in Wilmington, Delaware. This aircraft was in service with the French Aéronavale with Flottille 12 in Tunisia in the 1950s. While there are no records to confirm it, it is believed this aircraft saw combat in Algeria and the Suez Crisis. During the 1970s, while under the ownership of John "Shifty" Schafhausen of Spokane, Washington, it was one of eight Corsairs flown in the NBC series Baa Baa Black Sheep (later renamed Black Sheep Squadron). It appeared in all 35 episodes.
- 133722 – Based at Erickson Aircraft Collection in Madras, Oregon. It is in the markings of an F4U-4 flown by LTjg Jesse L. Brown, the first African-American Naval Aviator to see combat. He flew with VF-32 off the USS Leyte during the Korean War. Brown was shot down over North Korea during the Battle of Chosin Reservoir. His attempted rescue would lead to the Medal of Honor to be awarded to his wingman, Capt. Thomas J. Hudner Jr. Aircraft 133722 was in service with the French Aéronavale with Flottille 12.

FG-1D

- 67070 – based at Lewis Air Legends in San Antonio, Texas.
- 67087 – privately owned in Guerneville, California. Flies out of KSTS Santa Rosa, California as the KORBEL CHAMPAGNE CORSAIR. Owned by Gary Heck and flown by Will Whiteside. Restored by Ezell Aviation 2022.
- 67089 – based at American Airpower Museum in Farmingdale, New York.
- 88090 – privately owned in Buffalo, New York. Was NZ5612 in RNZAF service.
- 88303 – based at the Flying Heritage & Combat Armor Museum in Everett, Washington.
- 92050 – based at Warbird Heritage Foundation in Waukegan, Illinois.
- 92095 – privately owned in Latham, New York.
- 92433 – based at Mid America Flight Museum in Mount Pleasant, Texas. It was formerly BuNo. 92471. The original 92433, while under the ownership of Junior Burchinal, was one of eight Corsairs to appear in the 1970s NBC series Baa Baa Black Sheep (later renamed Black Sheep Squadron) and appeared in 30 of 35 episodes.
- 92463 – privately owned in Pembroke Pines, Florida.
- 92468 – based at Commemorative Air Force – (Dixie Wing) in Peachtree City, Georgia.
- 92489 – based at Dakota Territory Air Museum in Minot, North Dakota.
- 92508 – based at Military Aviation Museum in Virginia Beach, Virginia.
- 92629 – based at Palm Springs Air Museum in Palm Springs, California. A combat veteran of the July 1969 Soccer War, this former El Salvadoran FG-1D was one of eight Corsairs to appear in the 1970s NBC series Baa Baa Black Sheep (later renamed Black Sheep Squadron). It appeared in 32 or 35 episodes.

On display
F4U-1

- 02465 -National Naval Aviation Museum One of only a few surviving birdcage Corsairs in the world, it crashed into Lake Michigan within two months of its delivery while operating from USS Wolverine. It was recovered in 2010 and restored by the museum and placed in a hanging display in the World War II gallery.

F4U-1D

- 50375 – Steven F. Udvar-Hazy Center of the National Air and Space Museum in Chantilly, Virginia.

XF4U-4

- 80759 – New England Air Museum in Windsor Locks, Connecticut.

F4U-4

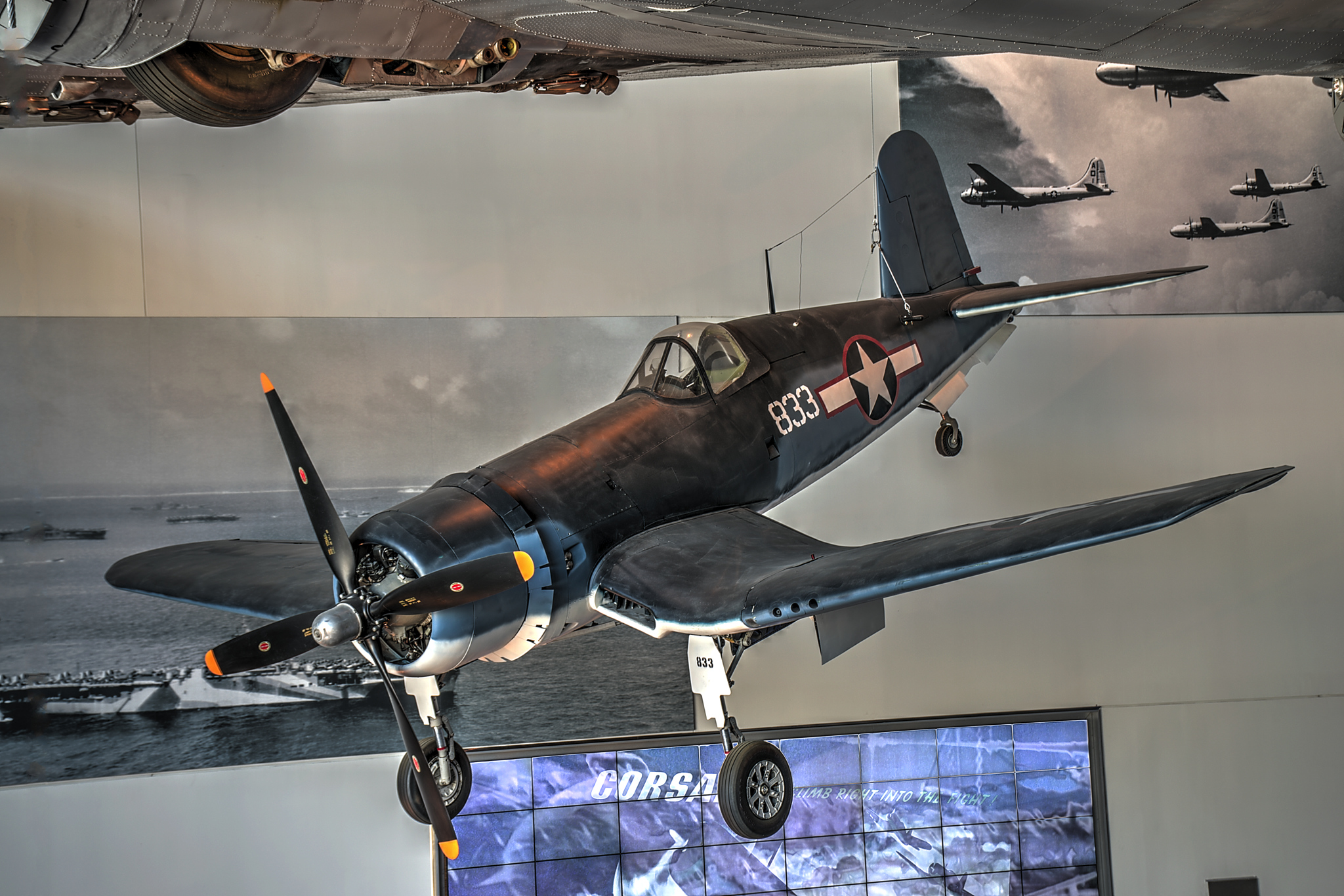
F4U-4 on display at the National World War II Museum

- bureau number unknown – National World War II Museum in New Orleans, Louisiana.
- 96885 – USS Midway Museum in San Diego, California.
- 97142 – Pima Air & Space Museum in Tucson, Arizona. It is on loan from the National Museum of the Marine Corps in Quantico, Virginia.
- 97259 – EAA AirVenture Museum in Oshkosh, Wisconsin.
- 97349 – National Naval Aviation Museum, NAS Pensacola, Florida.
- 97369 – National Museum of the Marine Corps in Quantico, Virginia.

F4U-5N

- 122189 – Flying Leatherneck Aviation Museum, MCAS Miramar, California.
- 124447 – Mid-America Air Museum in Liberal, Kansas.

F4U-7

- 133704 – Currently on display at the San Diego Air & Space Museum in San Diego, California. This aircraft was formerly on display at the USS Alabama Museum. It was heavily damaged in Hurricane Katrina. It was taken apart and sent to the San Diego Air and Space Museum in 2008. Over a three-year period, it was restored as an AU-1 in the markings of San Diego Padres long time announcer Jerry Coleman. Coleman flew SBD Dauntless dive bombers during World War II and returned to the Marines to fly the Corsairs in Korea. This aircraft was delivered to the French in May 1953 where it saw service in Algeria and the Suez with the French Aéronavale Flottille 14.

FG-1A

- 13459 – National Museum of the Marine Corps in Quantico, Virginia.

FG-1D

- 88368 – Patriots Point Naval & Maritime Museum in Charleston, South Carolina.
- 88382 – Museum of Flight in Seattle, Washington That was pulled out of lake Washington.
- 92013 – Previously displayed at US Navy Museum, Washington Navy Yard. As of March 2025, displayed at the Intrepid Museum, New York City.
- 92085 – Selfridge ANGB Museum, Selfridge ANGB, Michigan.
- 92246 – National Naval Aviation Museum, NAS Pensacola, Florida.
- 92509 – Air Zoo in Kalamazoo, Michigan.

Under restoration

F4U-1

- 02449 – to airworthiness by private owner in Cameron Park, California.

F4U-4

- 81164 – to airworthiness by Westpac Restorations for private owner in Colorado Springs, Colorado.
- 81857 – to airworthiness by private owner in Kindred, North Dakota.
- 97280 – to airworthiness by private owner in Wilmington, Delaware after crashing on 29 July 1999.
- 97302 – to airworthiness by private owner in Wilmington, Delaware after crashing on 1 April 1993.
- 97390 – to airworthiness by Yanks Air Museum in Chino, California.

F4U-5N

- 122179 – to airworthiness by private owner in Greenwood, Mississippi after crashing on 25 February 1984.

FG-1D

- 76628 – to airworthiness by private owner in Castro Valley, California.
- 88086 – in storage at the Fantasy of Flight in Polk City, Florida
- 92132 – to airworthiness by the Tri-State Warbird Museum in Batavia, Ohio. This aircraft was one of eight Corsairs to appear in the 1970s NBC series Baa Baa Black Sheep (later renamed Black Sheep Squadron). It appeared in all 35 episodes.
- 92304 – to airworthiness by private owner in Ione, California.
- 92436 – to airworthiness by private owner in Hillsboro, Oregon.
- 92460 – for static display by the Connecticut Air and Space Center in Stratford, Connecticut.
- 92490 – to airworthiness by private owner in Pembroke Pines, Florida.
- 92618 – to airworthiness by private owner in Pembroke Pines, Florida.
- 92642 – to airworthiness by private owner in Castro Valley, California.
- 92643 – to airworthiness by private owner in Pembroke Pines, Florida.

== Sortable Traits ==
S/N	Model	Owner	Location	Country	Status
17799	F4U-1A	Planes of Fame	Chino, California	United States	Airworthy
96995	F4U-4	Tyrolean Jet Service	Salzburg & Innsbruck	Austria	Airworthy
81698	F4U-4	War Eagles Air Museum	Santa Teresa, New Mexico	United States	Airworthy
97143	F4U-4	James Tobul	Bamberg, South Carolina	United States	Airworthy
97264	F4U-4	Comanche Warbirds Inc.	Houston, Texas	United States	Airworthy
97286	F4U-4	Fantasy of Flight	Polk City, Florida	United States	Airworthy
97359	F4U-4	Latshaw Drilling and Exploration Co.	Tulsa, Oklahoma	United States	Airworthy
97388	F4U-4	Wings of the North air museum (FCM)	Minneapolis MN	United States	Airworthy
124493	F4U-5	Graham Hosking		Australia	Airworthy
124724	F4U-5	Salis Collection	La Ferte-Alais	France	Airworthy
122179	F4U-5N	Fighters & Legends LCC	Greenwood, Mississippi	United States	Airworthy
124486	F4U-5N	Air Combat Museum	Springfield, Illinois	United States	Airworthy
124692	F4U-5N	Collings Foundation	Stow, Massachusetts	United States	Airworthy
124541	F4U-5NL	Flying Legends GmbH	Burbach	Germany	Airworthy
124560	F4U-5NL	Warbirds LLC	Kalispell, Montana	United States	Airworthy
121881	F4U-5P	Lone Star Flight Museum	Galveston, Texas	United States	Airworthy
122184	F4U-5P	Stonehenge Air Museum	Lincoln County, Montana	United States	Airworthy
133710	F4U-7	John O'Connor		United States	Airworthy
133722	F4U-7	Erickson Aircraft Collection	Madras, Oregon	United States	Airworthy
92106	FG-1	Vintage Wings of Canada	Gatineau, Québec	Canada	Airworthy
88297	FG-1	The Fighter Collection	Duxford	United Kingdom	Airworthy
88391	FG-1D	Greencare Aviation ‘ltd	Ardmore	New Zealand	Airworthy
67070	FG-1D	Lewis Air Legends	San Antonio, Texas	United States	Airworthy
67087	FG-1D	CC Air Corp.	Port Hueneme, California	United States	Airworthy
67089	FG-1D	American Airpower Museum	Farmingdale, New York	United States	Airworthy
88090	FG-1D	Barry Avent/Rare Air, Inc.	Bennetsville, South Carolina	United States	Airworthy
92095	FG-1D	Michael King Smith Foundation	McMinnville, Oregon	United States	Airworthy
92399	FG-1D	Cavanaugh Flight Museum	Addison, Texas	United States	Airworthy
92433	FG-1D	William Scott Glover	Mount Pleasant, Texas	United States	Airworthy
92436	FG-1D	Olympic Flight Museum	Olympia, Washington	United States	Airworthy
92468	FG-1D	Commemorative Air Force – Dixie Wing	Peachtree City, Georgia	United States	Airworthy
92489	FG-1D	Texas Flying Legends Museum	Houston, Texas	United States	Airworthy
92508	FG-1D	Military Aviation Museum	Virginia Beach, Virginia	United States	Airworthy
92629	FG-1D	Palm Springs Air Museum	Palm Springs, California	United States	Airworthy
17995	F4U-1	TAM Museum	São Carlos, SP	Brazil	On display
50375	F4U-1D	Steven F. Udvar-Hazy Center of the National Air and Space Museum	Chantilly, Virginia	United States	On display
97142	F4U-4	Pima Air & Space Museum	Tucson, Arizona	United States	On display
97259	F4U-4	EAA AirVenture Museum	Oshkosh, Wisconsin	United States	On display
97349	F4U-4	National Naval Aviation Museum	NAS Pensacola, Florida	United States	On display
97369	F4U-4	National Museum of the Marine Corps	Quantico, Virginia	United States	On display
unknown	F4U-4	National World War II Museum	New Orleans, Louisiana	United States	On display
121928	F4U-5	Museo de Aviacion Naval	Bahia Blanca NAS	Argentina	On display
124715	F4U-5	Museo del Aire de Honduras	Tegucigalpa AB	Honduras	On display
124447	F4U-5N	Mid-America Air Museum	Liberal, Kansas	United States	On display
122189	F4U-5P	Flying Leatherneck Aviation Museum	MCAS Miramar, California	United States	On display
14862	FG-1	Fleet Air Arm Museum	Yeovilton	United Kingdom	On display
13459	FG-1A	National Museum of the Marine Corps	Quantico, Virginia	United States	On display
88368	FG-1D	Patriots Point Naval & Maritime Museum	Charleston, South Carolina	United States	On display
88382	FG-1D	Museum of Flight	Seattle, Washington	United States	On display
92013	FG-1D	US Navy Museum	Washington Navy Yard	United States	On display
92085	FG-1D	Selfridge ANGB Museum	Selfridge ANGB, Michigan	United States	On display
92246	FG-1D	National Naval Aviation Museum	NAS Pensacola, Florida	United States	On display
92509	FG-1D	Air Zoo	Kalamazoo, Michigan	United States	On display
80759	XF4U-4	New England Air Museum	Windsor Locks, Connecticut	United States	On display
02270	F4U-1	Classic Jet Fighter Museum	Parafield, South Australia	Australia	Under restoration
10508	F4U-1	Ross Jowitt	Ardmore, Auckland	New Zealand	Under restoration
50000	F4U-1	Ross Jowitt	Ardmore, Auckland	New Zealand	Under restoration
82640	F4U-1D	Warbird Adventures	Mareeba, Queensland	Australia	Airworthy
88090	FG-1	Barry Avent	Bennettsville, South Carolina	United States	Under restoration
88086	FG-1D	Fantasy of Flight	Polk City, Florida	United States	Under restoration
88303	FG-1D	Flying Heritage Collection	Everett, Washington	United States	Airworthy
02465	F4U-1	National Naval Aviation Museum	NAS Pensacola, Florida	United States	Under restoration for display
96885	F4U-4	USS Midway Museum	San Diego, California	United States	Under restoration for display
133704	F4U-7	San Diego Air & Space Museum	San Diego, California	United States	Under restoration for display
92460	FG-1D	Connecticut Air and Space Center	Stratford, Connecticut	United States	Under restoration for display
04634	F3A-1	National Museum of WW2 Aviation	Colorado Springs, Colorado	United States	Airworthy
81164	F4U-4	James Tobul	Colorado Springs, Colorado	United States	Under restoration to airworthiness
81857	F4U-4	Robert and Donna Odegaard Family Ltd.	Kindred, North Dakota	United States	Under restoration to airworthiness
97280	F4U-4	Corsair Enterprises Inc.	Wilmington, Delaware	United States	Under restoration to airworthiness
97302	F4U-4	Corsair Enterprises Inc.	Wilmington, Delaware	United States	Under restoration to airworthiness
97390	F4U-4	Yanks Air Museum	Chino, California	United States	Under restoration to airworthiness
76628	FG-1D	Duane S. Doyle	Castro Valley, California	United States	Under restoration to airworthiness
92050	FG-1D	Warbird Heritage Foundation	Waukegan, Illinois	United States	Airworthy
92132	FG-1D	Tri-State Warbird Museum	Batavia, Ohio	United States	Under restoration to airworthiness
92304	FG-1D	DB Aero Inc.	Wilmington, Delaware	United States	Under restoration to airworthiness
92463	FG-1D	Brian O'Farrell Aviation Inc.	Pembroke Pines, Florida	United States	Under restoration to airworthiness
92490	FG-1D	Brian O'Farrell Aviation Inc.	Pembroke Pines, Florida	United States	Under restoration to airworthiness
92618	FG-1D	Brian O'Farrell Aviation Inc.	Pembroke Pines, Florida	United States	Under restoration to airworthiness
92642	FG-1D	Doyle Duane Trustee	Castro Valley, California	United States	Under restoration to airworthiness
92643	FG-1D	Brian O'Farrell Aviation Inc.	Pembroke Pines, Florida	United States	Under restoration to airworthiness
