= Wolverine 2 =

Wolverine 2 may refer to:

== Marvel Comic's Wolverine ==
- The second version of Wolverine
- Wolverine (comic book)'s issue 2 or volume 2 or second title
- The Wolverine, 2013 film, the second in the Wolverine film series

== Other ==
- M104 Wolverine, the second US Army Wolverine
- USS Wolverine (IX-64), the second USS Wolverine
- HMS Wolverine (1805), the second HMS Wolverine

== See also ==
- Wolverine (disambiguation)
- Wolverine 1 (disambiguation)
