= Curry Hill (Ironwood) =

Former ski jumping hill in Ironwood, Michigan

- Location: Ironwood, Michigan, US
- Coordinates: 46°28′24″N 90°11′09″W
- Operator: Ironwood Ski Club; Norrie Athletic Club
- Opened: 1906 (first time); 1922 (reopening)
- Closed: 1914 (first time); 1930 (collapsed)

Size
- K–point: K50
- Hill record: 56.4 m (185 ft) (United States) Walter Brattlund (1923)

Curry Hill was a K50 ski jumping hill located in Ironwood, Michigan, United States with two official world records set. It was operated by Ironwood Ski Club and Norrie Athletic Club.

== History ==
The Ironwood Ski Club (organized in 1905) operated the 40 meter Curry Hill ski jump from 1906 through 1914 and the Norrie Athletic Club operated the 50 meter Curry Hill site from 1922 to 1930 when it collapsed after a snow storm.

On 18 February 1911, American Anders Haugen set the first official world record at 152 feet (46 metres), the same day his fellow Barney Riley fell at 154 feet (47 metres) world record distance.

On 18 February 1912, American James Presthus fell at 156 feet (48 metres) world record distance and did not count as record.

On 16 February 1913, American Ragnar Omtvedt set the second official world record at 169 feet (52 metres) at the afternoon longest standing jump competition and earlier that day he successfully landed at 158 feet (48 meters) world record distance, but it didn't count as this was the professional competition. Barney Riley crashed that day at 161 and 165 feet, but the order of jumps is not clear, so it is not clear if those two were falls at world record distances or not, depends if those two jumps happened before or after Omtvedt set world record at 169 ft.

Elsewhere in 1915, American Ragnar Omtvedt successfully landed at 184 feet (56 metres) world record distance, but did not count as it was set at unofficial event.

== Ski jumping world records ==
No.	Date	Name	Country	Metres	Feet
#19	18 February 1911	Anders Haugen	United States	46.3	152
F	18 February 1911	Barney Riley	United States	46.9	154
F	18 February 1912	James Presthus	United States	47.5	156
PRO	16 February 1913	Ragnar Omtvedt	United States	48.2	158
F	16 February 1913	Barney Riley	United States	49.1	161
F	16 February 1913	Barney Riley	United States	50.3	165
#21	16 February 1913	Ragnar Omtvedt	United States	51.5	169
UN	1915	Ragnar Omtvedt	United States	56	184

Not recognized! Fall at world record distance.
Not recognized! Set at professional event. Standing jump.
Falls! Unclear if set before of after 169 ft? If at WR distances or not?.
Not recognized! Set at unofficial event. Standing jump.

== See also ==
- Wolverine Hill
- Copper Peak
