= X-Man (disambiguation) =

X-Man is a Marvel Comics superhero.

X-Man may also refer to:

- X-Man, a member of the X-Men
- X-Man (game show), a South Korean game show
- X-Man (video game)
- Xman, a 1987 novel by Michael Brodsky
- X Man (album), an album by Andrew Cyrille

== As nickname ==
- Xavier Carter (born 1985), nicknamed X-Man, American track and field athlete
- Xavier McDaniel (born 1963), nicknamed "the X-Man," American basketball player
- Xavier Nady (born 1978), nicknamed X-Man, American baseball player
- Xander Bogaerts (born 1992) nicknamed X-Man, Aruban baseball player
- Ken Carson (born 2000), nicknamed X-Man, American rapper

== See also ==
- X-Men (disambiguation)
