= Palm Springs Air Museum =

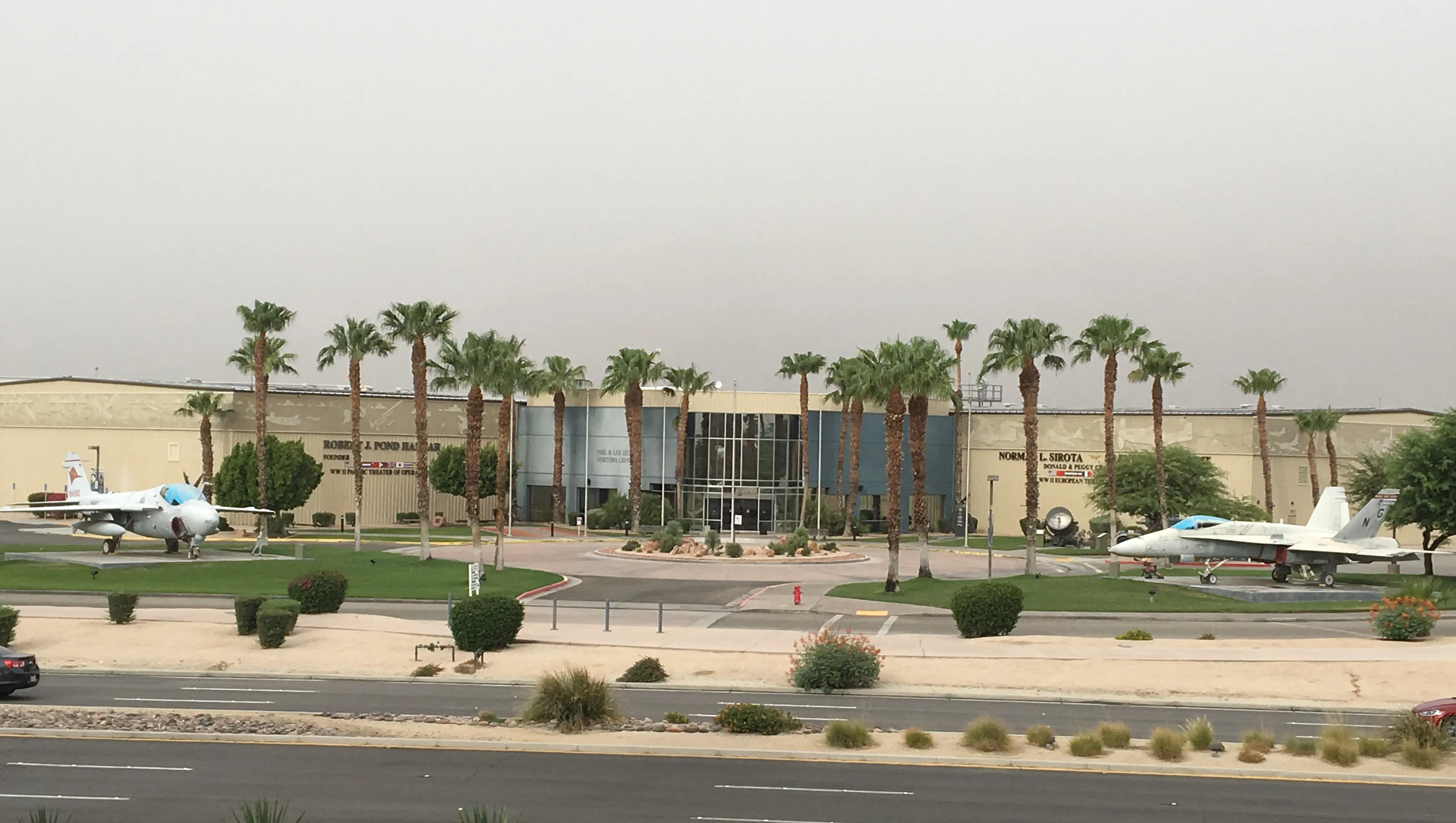

- Location within southern California
- Established: 1996
- Location: Palm Springs, California
- Coordinates: 33.8325°N 116.5047°W
- Type: Aviation museum
- Collection size: 75 aircraft
- Founders: Bill Byrne; Pete Madison; Charles Mayer; Bob Pond
- Director: Fred Bell
- Chairperson: Dan Gilbertson
- Website: www.palmspringsairmuseum.org

Palm Springs Air Museum is an aviation museum in Palm Springs, California. The 501(c)(3) nonprofit leases from the city 17 acres abutting Palm Springs International Airport.

The museum encompasses five themed hangars, outdoor displays, and a visitor center that includes a resource center with flight simulators. It operates warbird rides, air demonstrations, and talks by experts on specific topics. Many of the museum’s planes have been used in movies and fly in air shows.

== History ==
The museum was incorporated in 1994 by Harold Madison, Charles Mayer, and Bill Byrne. Madison contacted his friend Robert Pond, a World War II veteran who collected and rebuilt warbirds and classic cars. Pond's aircraft were displayed at the Planes of Fame East Museum in Eden Prairie, Minnesota and he agreed to loan some of them to the museum. The aircraft originally split their time between both museums, but when Planes of Fame East closed, the aircraft were permanently moved to Palm Springs. With planes and cars from Pond’s collection, Palm Springs Air Museum opened on 11 November 1996.

The museum opened a new hangar, named for Major General Ken Miles, in May 2017.

The museum broke ground on a new entrance and large classroom in 2024.

== Restorations ==
The museum hires certified mechanics to restore planes that will fly, while volunteers with restoration expertise work on exhibition-only planes. Among such projects was a Douglas SBD-5 Dauntless dive bomber recovered from the bottom of Lake Michigan 50 years after a Navy ensign, in carrier-landing training in 1944, had to ditch the plane when its engine failed.

In November of 2021, the museum began restoring a B-17 to airworthy condition after it had been on display since 2016 at the National Warplane Museum. The first engine-run test occurred in April of 2024.

During an exhibit launch for Walt Disney’s Grumman Gulfstream I on December 5, 2022, the Walt Disney Company announced that the museum was embarking on a two-year project to restore the interior of the plane that Disney used when he surveyed Florida for a theme-park location.

== Collection ==
The following are among aircraft exhibited at the museum.

- Aero S-106 1112
- Bell AH-1G Cobra 67-15574
- Bell H-13 Sioux – on loan
- Bell P-63A Kingcobra 42-68864
- Bell UH-1B Iroquois 63-8610
- Boeing-Stearman PT-17 Kaydet 38393
- Boeing VB-17G Flying Fortress 44-85778
- CAC Sabre F-8612/F-8607 – on loan
- Cessna O-2 Skymaster
- Consolidated PBY Catalina 48426
- Convair F-102A Delta Dagger 56-1432 – on loan
- Convair F-106B Delta Dart 57-2509
- Curtiss TP-40N Warhawk 44-7084
- Douglas B-26C Invader 44-35721
- Douglas RC-47 Dakota 035
- Douglas SBD-5 Dauntless 36176 – on loan
- Douglas TA-4J Skyhawk 154649 – on loan
- Erco 415D Ercoupe 4019
- Fairchild C-119G Flying Boxcar 53-8154 – fuselage only
- General Dynamics F-16C Fighting Falcon 163277 – on loan
- Grumman A-6E Intruder 154162 – on loan
- Grumman C-1A Trader 146048
- Grumman F6F-5K Hellcat 94473
- Grumman F7F-3 Tigercat 80412
- Grumman F-14A Tomcat 160898 – on loan
- Grumman FM-2 Wildcat 55627
- Grumman G-58B Gulfhawk D-1262
- Grumman Gulfstream I – owned by Walt Disney, on loan from the Disney Archives
- General Motors TBM-3 Avenger 53785
- Lockheed F-104G Starfighter D-8244
- Lockheed F-117 Nighthawk
- Lockheed PV-2 Harpoon 37211
- Lockheed TV-2 126591
- McDonnell Douglas F-4S Phantom II 153851 – on loan
- McDonnell Douglas F/A-18A Hornet 162403 – on loan
- MiG-17
- North American TB-25N Mitchell 44-86747
- North American F-100D Super Sabre 3-888
- North American P-51D Mustang 9273
- North American T-6G Texan 49-3402
- North American T-28B Trojan 138203
- Northrop Grumman EA-6B Prowler 163030 – on loan
- Piper J-3 Cub 4594
- Republic F-84F Thunderstreak 51-9531 – on loan
- Republic F-105D Thunderchief 61‐0108 – on loan
- Republic P-47D Thunderbolt 122
- Sikorsky UH-34D Seahorse 154895
- Supermarine Spitfire XIV SG108/RM694
- Vought FG-1D Corsair 92629

== Events ==
The museum holds an annual flower drop from its B-25 on Memorial Day.

== Programs ==
In addition to giving tours to local youth and creating curriculum guides for teachers anywhere on the topics of World War II and women in aviation, the museum runs the following programs:

First Flight Experience is geared toward aspiring pilots from 12 to 17 years of age. Each student receives an introduction to flight aboard a Cessna 182 Skylane. Because they participate in the pre-flight check and learn about take-off, landing, and in-air maneuvers, their time in the air counts toward the number of hours needed to qualify for a pilot’s license.

The museum’s Young Science Professionals Scholarship Fund is for high school seniors and undergraduate students accepted to or enrolled in a four-year college.

== In popular culture ==
Walt Disney maintained a second home in Palm Springs and was instrumental in getting a bond measure to fund Palm Springs Municipal [now International] Airport. His personal Grumman Gulfstream I, on long-term loan from The Walt Disney Company, appeared in Disney Studios' films The Computer Wore Tennis Shoes (1969) and Now You See Him, Now You Don't (1972). The plane transported Hollywood stars, as well as former Presidents Ronald Reagan and Jimmy Carter on trips to Palm Springs.

Clay Lacy’s Learjet 24A is exhibited with photographs showing its inclusion in a wide range of television and movie productions, among which are Dragnet, Magnum P.I., Miami Vice, Airport 1975, and Any Which Way You Can.

The museum’s Grumman Wildcat was purchased after World War II by Warner Bros. Studio and used in the 1949 film Task Force.

Disney recorded the engine of the museum’s Vought F4U Corsair for its 2013 animated movie Planes to provide sound for the film's Corsair.

The museum’s Boeing B-17 "Movie Memphis Belle" was used in the 1990 film Memphis Belle.

The museum’s P-51 Mustang "Man O’ War" was purchased by Universal Studios in 1957 and was used in the 1957 movie Battle Hymn.

== See also ==
- List of aviation museums
