= Wolverine 1 =

Wolverine 1 may refer to:

== Marvel Comic's Wolverine ==
- The original version of Wolverine
- Wolverine (comic book)'s issue 1 or volume 1 or first title
- X-Men Origins: Wolverine, 2009 film, the first in the Wolverine film series

== Other ==
- M10 Wolverine, the first US Army Wolverine
- USS Wolverine (IX-31), the first USS Wolverine
- HMS Wolverine (1798), the first HMS Wolverine

== See also ==
- Wolverine (disambiguation)
- Wolverine 2 (disambiguation)
