= Haugen Hill =

Ski jumping hill in Dillon, Colorado

Coordinates: 39.61333°N 106.06583°W

- Location: Dillon, Colorado, US
- Opened: 8 March 1918
- Closed: 1961

Size
- K–point: K60
- Hill record: 65.2 m (214 ft); Anders Haugen (29 February 1920)

Haugen Hill was a ski jumping hill in Dillon, Colorado. Owned by Dillon Ski Club, it had a K-point at 60 meters.

== History ==
Haugen Hill was constructed by Peter Prestrud, Eyvin Flood, and Anders Haugen, and it was opened on March 8, 1918. Haugen Hill is no longer in use. Two world records in ski jumping were set at Haugen Hill.

== Ski jumping world records ==
Date	Name	Country	Metres	Feet
March 1919	Anders Haugen	United States	64.9	213
29 February 1920	Anders Haugen	United States	65.2	214
