= Anders Haugen =

American ski jumper (1888–1984)

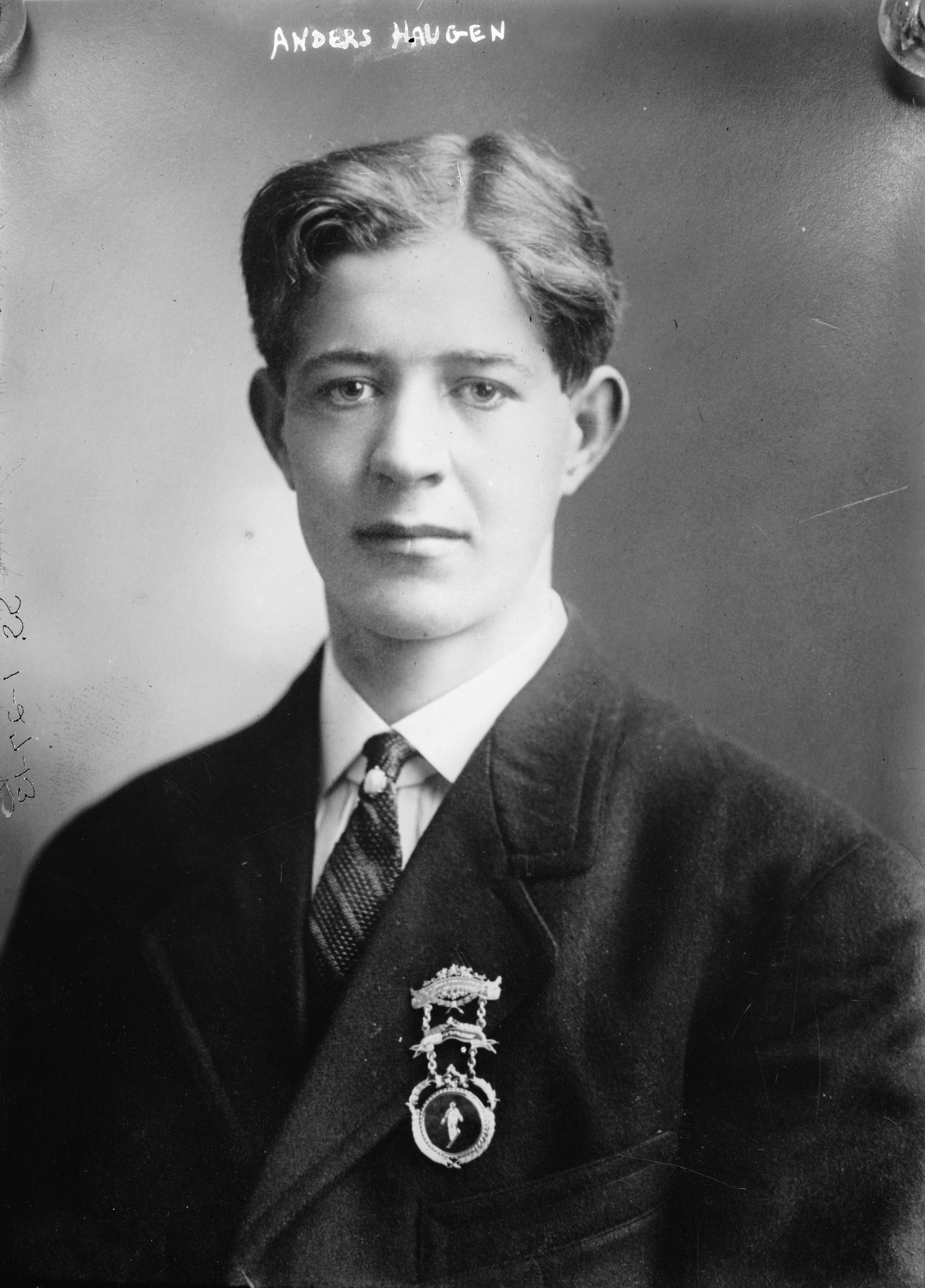
- Anders Haugen

Personal information
- Nationality: United States
- Born: 24 November 1888 Bø Municipality, Sweden-Norway
- Died: 14 April 1984 (aged 95) Yucaipa, California, U.S.

Sport
- Sport: Skiing

Achievements and titles
- Personal bests: 65.2 m (214 ft); Dillon, Colorado, US (29 February 1920)
Medal record
Men's ski jumping
Olympic Games
Bronze medal – third place	1924 Chamonix	Individual large hill
World Championships
Bronze medal – third place	1924 Chamonix	Individual large hill

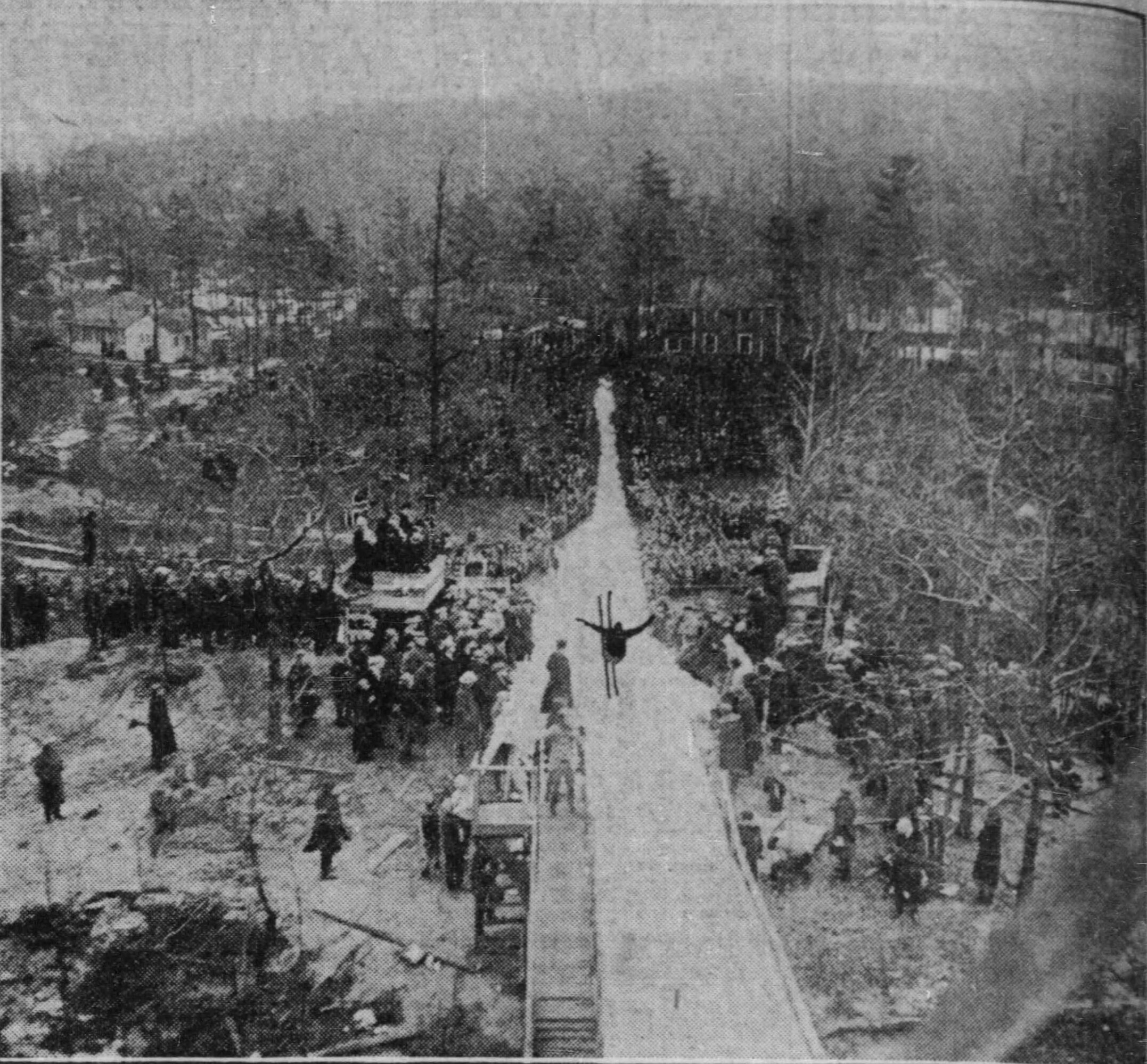
January 1926 jump by Haugen at a competition in Grand Beach, Michigan

Anders Olsen Haugen (October 24, 1888 – April 14, 1984) was a Norwegian-American ski jumper who won four national ski jumping championships. He competed in the 1924 Winter Olympics in Chamonix and the 1928 Winter Olympics in St. Moritz. Anders Haugen was the first and, as of 2026, only American to win an Olympic medal for ski jumping.

== Biography ==
Anders Olsen Haugen was born in Bø Municipality, Norway. Anders Haugen and his brother Lars emigrated to the United States in 1909 and built a ski jumping hill with the Milwaukee Ski Club near Lake Nagawicka west of Milwaukee, Wisconsin, in order to open ski jumping to the public of the area.

In 1911 Anders Haugen set a world record of 46m (152 feet) on Curry Hill in Ironwood, Michigan while winning the National Championship. Between 1910 and 1920, the Haugen brothers won the U.S. National Championships eleven times. In 1919 and 1920, Anders Haugen set the two world record ski jumping distances of 213 ft (64.92m) and 214 ft (65.23m), respectively.

He was Captain of the first US skiing team at the 1924 Winter Olympics.

Haugen and his brothers later moved to Chippewa Falls, Wisconsin and then Frisco, Colorado.

Haugen had won the 1924 Olympic ski jumping bronze medal in the individual large hill, though he was not awarded the medal due to a scoring error. In 1974, at the 50th reunion of the 1924 Norwegian team, Norwegian sports historian Jacob Vaage was going over the results when he noticed an error. The bronze medal had been awarded to Norwegian skier Thorleif Haug, who also won three gold medals in the first Winter Olympics in Chamonix. On 12 September 1974, Anders Haugen came to Norway as an 85-year-old and was given the bronze medal by Anna Maria Magnussen, Thorleif Haug's youngest daughter.

In 1929, Haugen and his brother Lars moved to the Lake Tahoe area in California, where he developed the Lake Tahoe Ski Club. Up until his 70s, he directed the junior skiing program at the ski club. Haugen was elected to the Colorado Ski and Snowboard Hall of Fame in 1978.

Haugen was inducted into the U.S. Ski Hall of Fame in 1963. His bronze medal is on display at the Hall of Fame in Ishpeming, Michigan.

He died at Redlands Community Hospital in San Bernardino, California on April 14, 1984, of kidney failure, and had been suffering from prostate cancer.

== Personal life ==
Haugen became a strict vegetarian in 1911 and adhered to the diet for the rest of his life. He stated that his vegetarian diet gave him more strength and improved his skiing performance. He was a teetotaler and non-smoker. He married Mina Amundson in 1917, they had two sons.

== Cross-country skiing results ==
=== Olympic Games ===
Year	Age	18 km	50 km
1924	35	33	—
1928	39	43	—

== Ski jumping world records ==
Date	Hill	Location	Metres	Feet
19 February 1911	Curry Hill	Ironwood, United States	46.3	152
1919	Howelsen Hill	Steamboat Springs, United States	62.2	205
9 March 1919	Haugen Hill	Dillon, United States	64.9	213
29 February 1920	Haugen Hill	Dillon, United States	65.2	214

Not recognized! Crash at world record distance.
