= Ragnar Omtvedt =

American Nordic skier

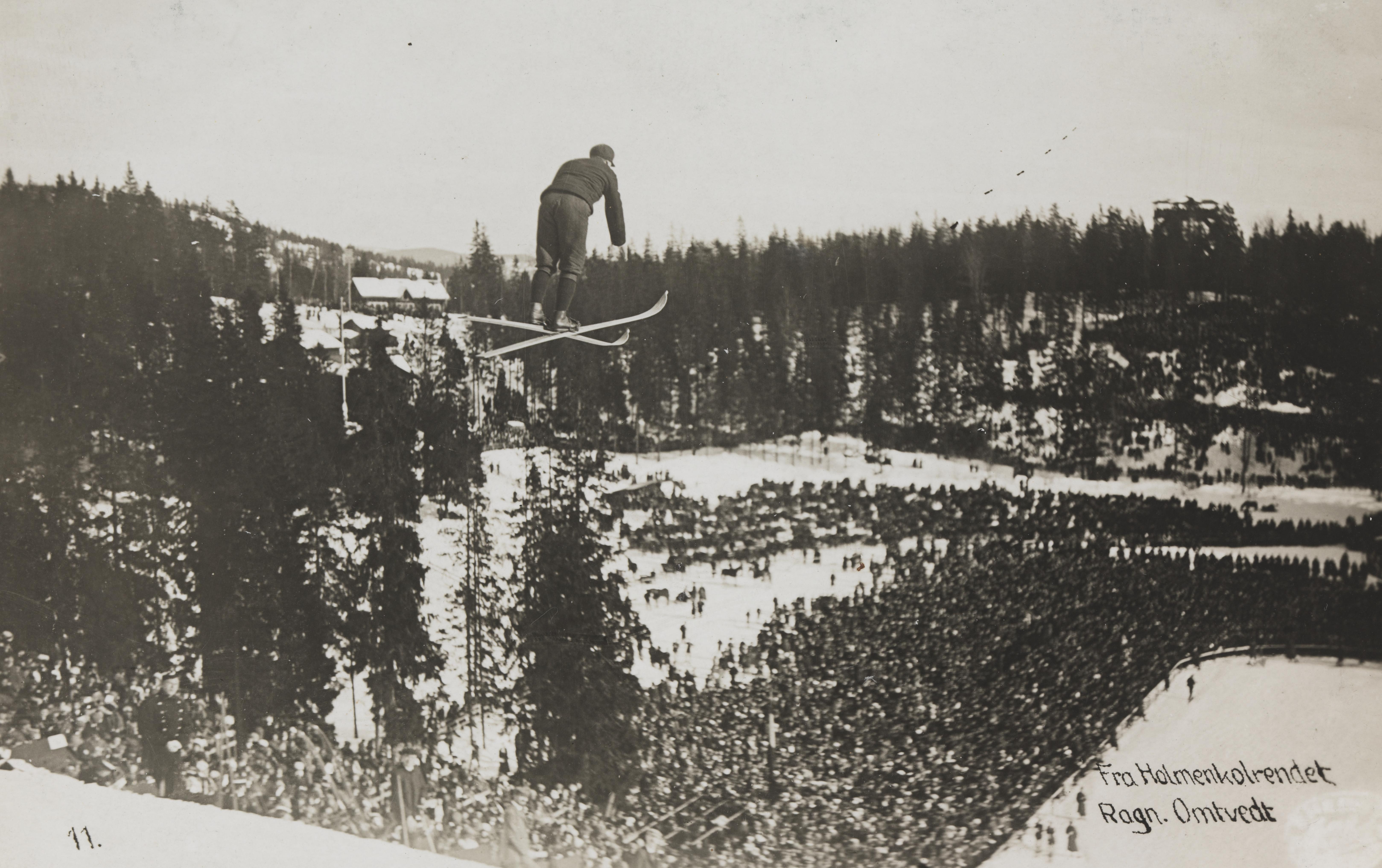
- Ragnar Omtvedt in Holmenkollen 1911

Personal information
- Nationality: United States
- Born: February 18, 1890 Christiania, Norway
- Died: 31 March 1975 (aged 85) St. Lucie County, FL, US

Sport
- Sport: Skiing
- Club: Viking (1909), Trym (1910–1911), Norge (1912–1924)

Achievements and titles
- Personal bests: 58.5 m (192 ft); Steamboat Springs, US (18 February 1916)

Ragnar Omtvedt (18 February 1890–31 March 1975) was a Norwegian born, American Olympic skier.

== Career ==
Ragnar Omtvedt was born in Oslo, Norway. In 1912, he emigrated to the United States. He was the US Ski Jumping Champion three times (1913, 1914 and 1917), and 1922 Canadian champion.

On 16 February 1913, his first year competing in the United States, he set a world record of 51.5 m (169 ft) on Curry Hill in Ironwood, Michigan, United States.

On 18 February 1916, he set another ski jumping world record at 58.5 m (192.9 ft) in Steamboat Springs, Colorado, where there is currently a restaurant named after him (Ragnar's).

He competed in cross-country skiing and Nordic combined at the 1924 Winter Olympics in Chamonix. Before the Olympics, Omtvedt was removed from the team after it emerged that he had participated in competitions with cash prizes, in violation of the policy of amateurism that the Olympics enforced at the time. Omtvedt was reinstated after he said that the cash prizes he had won were insufficient to cover the costs of participation in those events. While attempting a jump in Chamonix on February 4, 1924, Omtvedt fell 55 feet and dislocated his knee. He laid in the snow for two hours before being found, and did not receive medical attention for another three hours after that. The injury ended his jumping career. He was elected into the U.S. National Ski Hall of Fame in 1967. He died in Florida in 1975.

== Ski jumping world records ==
| Date | Hill | Location | Metres | Feet |
|---|---|---|---|---|
| 16 February 1913 | Curry Hill | Ironwood, United States | 48.2 | 158 |
| 16 February 1913 | Curry Hill | Ironwood, United States | 51.5 | 169 |
| 18 February 1916 | Howelsen Hill | Steamboat Springs, United States | 58.5 | 192.9 |

Not recognized! Stood at world record distance, but achieved at professional championships.
