= Wolverine Hill =

Closed ski jumping hill in Michigan, United States

Coordinates: 46°29′28.0″N 90°06′50.1″W

- Location: Ironwood, Michigan, US
- Opened: 1936, reopened in 1975
- Closed: original in 1963, 1995

Size
- K–point: K60
- Hill record: 68 m (223 ft) (1983)

Wolverine Hill was a ski jumping hill located in Ironwood, Michigan, United States.

== History ==
Owned by the Gogebic Range Ski Club, it had a K-point at 60 meters. Torger Tokle, the Norwegian immigrant to the US in 1939, set the hill record of 66 m (216 ft.) in 1942. The record would last through the life of the original hill.

First built in 1935 and hosted competitions every winter---except for the World War II years---and remained in use until 1963, when it was demolished in a storm. The facilities were rebuilt in 1975 and hosted the USA Ski team for practice in November 1975. Steve Sydow of Duluth set a new hill record of 68 m (223 ft.) in 1983. The Wolverine Hill was in operation until 1995 when declining numbers of competitors forced its closing.

== See also ==
- Curry Hill (Ironwood)
- Copper Peak
