= X-Men (disambiguation) =

The X-Men are a fictional team of superheroes appearing in comic books published by Marvel Comics.

X-Men may also refer to:

== Franchise ==
=== Comics ===
- List of X-Men comics
  - The X-Men, ongoing comic book series published since 1963, later renamed Uncanny X-Men
  - X-Men: Legacy, 1991–2014 comic series, also known as X-Men (vol. 2) and New X-Men
  - X-Men (comic book), ongoing comic book series starting in 2010

=== Television ===
- X-Men: The Animated Series, a 1992–1997 animated series
- X-Men: Evolution, a 2000–2003 animated series
- Wolverine and the X-Men, a 2009 animated series
- X-Men, a 2011 Marvel anime television series
- X-Men '97, a 2024 animated series

=== Film ===
- X-Men (film series), a film series and franchise
  - X-Men (film), 2000, first film in the series
- X-Men (2028 film), upcoming Marvel Studios film, reboot of the series

=== Games ===
- X-Men (1992 video game)
- X-Men (1993 video game)
- X-Men (1994 video game)

== Other ==
- The X-Ecutioners, American band originally known as X-Men
- St. Francis Xavier X-Men, men's sport teams of the St. Francis Xavier University

== See also ==
- X-Man (disambiguation)
- The Uncanny X-Men (video game), 1989, also known as Marvel's X-Men
- Uncanny X-Men (band), an Australian rock band
