= USS Wolverine =

Two ships of the United States Navy have been named USS Wolverine. The name refers either to the mammal itself or the Wolverine State, a nickname for the state of Michigan.

- USS Wolverine (IX-31), a sidewheel steamer in commission from 1844 to 1912, originally named USS Michigan, renamed Wolverine on 17 June 1905 and reclassified as unclassified miscellaneous vessel IX-31 on 17 July 1920
- USS Wolverine (IX-64), a training aircraft carrier in commission from 1942 to 1945
